= 2024 Australian Open – Day-by-day summaries =

The 2024 Australian Open described in detail, in the form of day-by-day summaries.

All dates are AEDT (UTC+11)

== Day 1 (14 January) ==
- Seeds out:
  - Women's singles: Liudmila Samsonova [13], (Poland) Magda Linette [20], (China) Wang Xinyu [30]
- Schedule of Play

Matches on Main Courts
Matches on Rod Laver Arena
Event	Winner	Loser	Score
Men's singles 1st Round	(Italy) Jannik Sinner [4]	(Netherlands) Botic van de Zandschulp	6–4, 7–5, 6–3
Women's singles 1st Round	(Greece) Maria Sakkari [8]	(Japan) Nao Hibino	6–4, 6–1
Men's singles 1st Round	(Serbia) Novak Djokovic [1]	(Croatia) Dino Prižmić [Q]	6–2, 6–7^{(7–5)}, 6–3, 6–4
Women's singles 1st Round	Aryna Sabalenka [2]	(Germany) Ella Seidel [Q]	6–0, 6–1
Matches on Margaret Court Arena
Event	Winner	Loser	Score
Women's singles 1st Round	(Czech Republic) Barbora Krejčíková [9]	(Japan) Mai Hontama [WC]	2–6, 6–4, 6–3
Men's singles 1st Round	Andrey Rublev [5]	(Brazil) Thiago Seyboth Wild	7–5, 6–4, 3–6, 4–6, 7–6^{(10–6)}
Women's singles 1st Round	(Denmark) Caroline Wozniacki [WC]	(Poland) Magda Linette [20]	6–2, 2–0 retired
Men's singles 1st Round	(United States) Frances Tiafoe [17]	(Croatia) Borna Ćorić	6–3, 7–6^{(9–7)}, 2–6, 6–3
Matches on John Cain Arena
Event	Winner	Loser	Score
Women's singles 1st Round	(Canada) Leylah Fernandez [32]	(Czech Republic) Sára Bejlek [Q]	7–6^{(7–5)}, 6–2
Men's singles 1st Round	(Argentina) Francisco Cerúndolo [22]	(Australia) Dane Sweeny [Q]	3–6, 6–3, 6–4, 2–6, 6–2
Men's singles 1st Round	(United States) Taylor Fritz [12]	(Argentina) Facundo Díaz Acosta	4–6, 6–3, 3–6, 6–2, 6–4
Matches on Kia Arena
Event	Winner	Loser	Score
Men's singles 1st Round	(Italy) Matteo Arnaldi	(Australia) Adam Walton [WC]	7–6^{(7–5)}, 6–2, 6–4
Women's singles 1st Round	Maria Timofeeva [Q]	(France) Alizé Cornet [WC]	6–2, 6–4
Women's singles 1st Round	(United States) Amanda Anisimova [PR]	Liudmila Samsonova [13]	6–3, 6–4
Men's singles 1st Round	(Colombia) Daniel Elahi Galán	(Australia) Jason Kubler [WC]	2–6, 6–3, 7–6^{(7–3)}, 4–6, 7–6^{(10–8)}
Matches on 1573 Arena
Event	Winner	Loser	Score
Women's singles 1st Round	(Ukraine) Lesia Tsurenko [28]	(Italy) Lucia Bronzetti	3–6, 7–5, 6–3
Men's singles 1st Round	(Hungary) Fábián Marozsán	(Croatia) Marin Čilić [PR]	6–1, 2–6, 6–2, 7–5
Men's singles 1st Round	(Argentina) Sebastián Báez [26]	(United States) J. J. Wolf	3–6, 6–2, 6–3, 3–0 retired
Coloured background indicates a night match
Day matches began at 11 am (12 pm on Rod Laver Arena and Margaret Court Arena), whilst Night matches began at 7 pm AEDT

== Day 2 (15 January) ==
- Seeds out:
  - Men's singles: (Chile) Nicolás Jarry [18]
  - Women's singles: (Czech Republic) Markéta Vondroušová [7], Veronika Kudermetova [15], Ekaterina Alexandrova [17], (Croatia) Donna Vekić [21], Anastasia Potapova [23], (Ukraine) Anhelina Kalinina [24], (Czech Republic) Marie Bouzková [31]
- Schedule of Play

Matches on Main Courts
Matches on Rod Laver Arena
Event	Winner	Loser	Score
Women's singles 1st Round	(United States) Coco Gauff [4]	(Slovakia) Anna Karolína Schmiedlová	6–3, 6–0
Men's singles 1st Round	(Greece) Stefanos Tsitsipas [7]	(Belgium) Zizou Bergs [LL]	5–7, 6–1, 6–1, 6–3
Men's singles 1st Round	(Australia) Alex de Minaur [10]	(Canada) Milos Raonic [PR]	6–7^{(6–8)}, 6–3, 2–0, retired
Women's singles 1st Round	(France) Caroline Garcia [16]	(Japan) Naomi Osaka [PR]	6–4, 7–6^{(7–2)}
Matches on Margaret Court Arena
Event	Winner	Loser	Score
Men's singles 1st Round	Daniil Medvedev [3]	(France) Térence Atmane [Q]	5–7, 6–2, 6–4, 1–0 retired
Women's singles 1st Round	Anastasia Pavlyuchenkova	(Croatia) Donna Vekić [21]	6–4, 6–4
Women's singles 1st Round	(Tunisia) Ons Jabeur [6]	(Ukraine) Yulia Starodubtseva [Q]	6–3, 6–1
Men's singles 1st Round	(Canada) Félix Auger-Aliassime [27]	(Austria) Dominic Thiem	6–3, 7–5, 6–7^{(5–7)}, 5–7, 6–3
Matches on John Cain Arena
Event	Winner	Loser	Score
Women's singles 1st Round	(Ukraine) Dayana Yastremska [Q]	(Czech Republic) Markéta Vondroušová [7]	6–1, 6–2
Men's singles 1st Round	(Australia) Alexei Popyrin	(Australia) Marc Polmans [WC]	6–3, 7–6^{(7–5)}, 6–2
Women's singles 1st Round	(Poland) Magdalena Fręch	(Australia) Daria Saville [WC]	6–7^{(5–7)}, 6–3, 7–5
Men's singles 1st Round	(Poland) Hubert Hurkacz [9]	(Australia) Omar Jasika [Q]	7–6^{(7–4)}, 6–4, 6–2
Matches on Kia Arena
Event	Winner	Loser	Score
Women's singles 1st Round	(Australia) Storm Hunter [Q]	(Italy) Sara Errani	6–4, 6–3
Men's singles 1st Round	(France) Adrian Mannarino [20]	(Switzerland) Stan Wawrinka	6–4, 3–6, 5–7, 6–3, 6–0
Men's singles 1st Round	(Argentina) Tomás Martín Etcheverry [30]	(United Kingdom) Andy Murray	6–4, 6–2, 6–2
Women's singles 1st Round	(Brazil) Beatriz Haddad Maia [10]	(Czech Republic) Linda Fruhvirtová	6–2, 3–6, 6–2
Matches on 1573 Arena
Event	Winner	Loser	Score
Women's singles 1st Round	(Ukraine) Elina Svitolina [19]	(Australia) Taylah Preston [WC]	6–2, 6–2
Men's singles 1st Round	(United States) Ben Shelton [16]	(Spain) Roberto Bautista Agut	6–2, 7–6^{(7–2)}, 7–5
Men's singles 1st Round	Karen Khachanov [15]	(Germany) Daniel Altmaier	5–7, 6–3, 7–6^{(7–5)}, 7–6^{(7–3)}
Women's singles 1st Round	(Netherlands) Arantxa Rus	(Ukraine) Anhelina Kalinina [24]	6–0, 6–1
Coloured background indicates a night match
Day matches began at 11 am (12 pm on Rod Laver Arena and Margaret Court Arena), whilst Night matches began at 7 pm AEDT

== Day 3 (16 January) ==
- Seeds out:
  - Men's singles: (Kazakhstan) Alexander Bublik [31]
  - Women's singles: (Romania) Sorana Cîrstea [22], (China) Zhu Lin [29]
  - Men's doubles: (Belgium) Sander Gillé / (Belgium) Joran Vliegen [15]
  - Women's doubles: (Japan) Miyu Kato / (Indonesia) Aldila Sutjiadi [13], (United States) Bethanie Mattek-Sands / (China) Wang Xinyu [14]
- Schedule of Play

Matches on Main Courts
Matches on Rod Laver Arena
Event	Winner	Loser	Score
Women's singles 1st Round	(Poland) Iga Świątek [1]	(United States) Sofia Kenin	7–6^{(7–2)}, 6–2
Men's singles 1st Round	(Denmark) Holger Rune [8]	(Japan) Yoshihito Nishioka	6–2, 4–6, 7–6^{(7–3)}, 6–4
Women's singles 1st Round	(Kazakhstan) Elena Rybakina [3]	(Czech Republic) Karolína Plíšková	7–6^{(8–6)}, 6–4
Men's singles 1st Round	(Spain) Carlos Alcaraz [2]	(France) Richard Gasquet	7–6^{(7–5)}, 6–1, 6–2
Matches on Margaret Court Arena
Event	Winner	Loser	Score
Men's singles 1st Round	(Norway) Casper Ruud [11]	(Spain) Albert Ramos Viñolas	6–1, 6–3, 6–1
Women's singles 1st Round	Victoria Azarenka [18]	(Italy) Camila Giorgi	6–1, 4–6, 6–3
Men's singles 1st Round	(Germany) Alexander Zverev [6]	(Germany) Dominik Koepfer	4–6, 6–3, 7–6^{(7–3)}, 6–3
Women's singles 1st Round	(United States) Jessica Pegula [5]	(Canada) Rebecca Marino [Q]	6–2, 6–4
Matches on John Cain Arena
Event	Winner	Loser	Score
Women's singles 1st Round	(United States) Sloane Stephens	(Australia) Olivia Gadecki [WC]	6–3, 6–1
Men's singles 1st Round	(Bulgaria) Grigor Dimitrov [13]	(Hungary) Márton Fucsovics	4–6, 6–3, 7–6^{(7–1)}, 6–2
Men's singles 1st Round	(Australia) Thanasi Kokkinakis	(Austria) Sebastian Ofner	7–6^{(7–1)}, 2–6, 6–7^{(4–7)}, 6–1, 7–6^{(10–8)}
Women's singles 1st Round	(Australia) Ajla Tomljanović [PR]	(Croatia) Petra Martić	7–6^{(7–3)}, 4–6, 6–4
Matches on Kia Arena
Event	Winner	Loser	Score
Women's singles 1st Round	Daria Kasatkina [14]	(United States) Peyton Stearns	6–2, 3–6, 6–3
Men's singles 1st Round	(Australia) Max Purcell	(Hungary) Máté Valkusz [Q]	3–6, 7–6^{(7–2)}, 6–4, 7–5
Men's singles 1st Round	(United States) Tommy Paul [14]	(France) Grégoire Barrère	6–2, 6–3, 6–3
Women's singles 1st Round	(China) Zheng Qinwen [12]	(United States) Ashlyn Krueger	3–6, 6–2, 6–3
Matches on 1573 Arena
Event	Winner	Loser	Score
Men's singles 1st Round	(United Kingdom) Cameron Norrie [19]	(Peru) Juan Pablo Varillas	6–4, 6–4, 6–2
Women's singles 1st Round	(United States) Danielle Collins	(Germany) Angelique Kerber [PR]	6–2, 3–6, 6–1
Men's singles 1st Round	(China) Shang Juncheng [WC]	(United States) Mackenzie McDonald	6–3, 1–6, 3–6, 6–4, 6–2
Women's singles 1st Round	(United Kingdom) Emma Raducanu [PR]	(United States) Shelby Rogers [PR]	6–3, 6–2
Coloured background indicates a night match
Day matches began at 11 am (12 pm on Rod Laver Arena and Margaret Court Arena), whilst Night matches began at 7 pm AEDT

== Day 4 (17 January) ==
Rain disrupted play in all of the outdoor courts for three hours at 14:00. Play was not disrupted on Rod Laver, Margaret Court, and John Cain Arenas, as all three courts have retractable roofs.

- Seeds out:
  - Men's singles: (United States) Frances Tiafoe [17], (Argentina) Francisco Cerúndolo [22], (Italy) Lorenzo Musetti [25]
  - Women's singles: (Tunisia) Ons Jabeur [6], (Greece) Maria Sakkari [8], (France) Caroline Garcia [16], (Belgium) Elise Mertens [25], (Canada) Leylah Fernandez [32]
  - Women's doubles: (Brazil) Ingrid Martins / (Romania) Monica Niculescu [15]
- Schedule of Play

Matches on Main Courts
Matches on Rod Laver Arena
Event	Winner	Loser	Score
Women's singles 2nd Round	Mirra Andreeva	(Tunisia) Ons Jabeur [6]	6–0, 6–2
Men's singles 2nd Round	(Australia) Alex de Minaur [10]	(Italy) Matteo Arnaldi	6–3, 6–0, 6–3
Women's singles 2nd Round (Note: This match was originally scheduled to play on 1573 Arena but was moved to Rod Laver Arena due to heavy rain in outdoor matches.)	(Brazil) Beatriz Haddad Maia [10]	Alina Korneeva [Q]	6–1, 6–2
Women's singles 2nd Round	Aryna Sabalenka [2]	(Czech Republic) Brenda Fruhvirtová [Q]	6–3, 6–2
Men's singles 2nd Round	(Serbia) Novak Djokovic [1]	(Australia) Alexei Popyrin	6–3, 4–6, 7–6^{(7–4)}, 6–3
Matches on Margaret Court Arena
Event	Winner	Loser	Score
Men's singles 2nd Round	(Italy) Jannik Sinner [4]	(Netherlands) Jesper de Jong [Q]	6–2, 6–2, 6–2
Women's singles 2nd Round	(United States) Coco Gauff [4]	(United States) Caroline Dolehide	7–6^{(7–2)}, 6–2
Men's singles 2nd Round	(Greece) Stefanos Tsitsipas [7]	(Australia) Jordan Thompson	4–6, 7–6^{(8–6)}, 6–2, 7–6^{(7–4)}
Women's singles 2nd Round	Elina Avanesyan	(Greece) Maria Sakkari [8]	6–4, 6–4
Matches on John Cain Arena
Event	Winner	Loser	Score
Women's singles 2nd Round	Maria Timofeeva [Q]	(Denmark) Caroline Wozniacki [WC]	1–6, 6–4, 6–1
Women's singles 2nd Round	(Australia) Storm Hunter [Q]	(Germany) Laura Siegemund	6–4, 3–6, 6–3
Men's singles 2nd Round	(United States) Ben Shelton [16]	(Australia) Christopher O'Connell	6–4, 6–1, 3–6, 7–6^{(7–5)}
Men's singles 2nd Round	Andrey Rublev [5]	(United States) Christopher Eubanks	6–4, 6–4, 6–4
Matches on Kia Arena
Event	Winner	Loser	Score
Women's singles 2nd Round	(United States) Alycia Parks	(Canada) Leylah Fernandez [32]	7–5, 6–4
Men's singles 2nd Round	(United States) Taylor Fritz [12]	(France) Hugo Gaston [LL]	6–0, 6–3, 6–1
Men's singles 2nd Round	(Czech Republic) Tomáš Macháč	(United States) Frances Tiafoe [17]	6–4, 6–4, 7–6^{(7–5)}
Women's singles 2nd Round	(Ukraine) Marta Kostyuk	(Belgium) Elise Mertens [25]	5–7, 6–1, 7–6^{(10–6)}
Matches on 1573 Arena
Event	Winner	Loser	Score
Men's singles 2nd Round	(Argentina) Sebastián Báez [26]	(Colombia) Daniel Elahi Galán	7–5, 2–6, 6–2, 6–4
Women's singles 2nd Round	(Poland) Magdalena Fręch	(France) Caroline Garcia [16]	6–4, 7–6^{(7–2)}
Women's doubles 1st Round	(Australia) Daria Saville [WC] (Australia) Ajla Tomljanović [WC]	(Georgia (country)) Oksana Kalashnikova (United Kingdom) Maia Lumsden	6–4, 6–3
Coloured background indicates a night match
Day matches began at 11 am (12 pm on Rod Laver Arena and Margaret Court Arena), whilst Night matches began at 7 pm AEDT

== Day 5 (18 January) ==
- Seeds out:
  - Men's singles: (Denmark) Holger Rune [8], (Spain) Alejandro Davidovich Fokina [23], (Germany) Jan-Lennard Struff [24], (Czech Republic) Jiří Lehečka [32]
  - Women's singles: (Kazakhstan) Elena Rybakina [3], (United States) Jessica Pegula [5], Daria Kasatkina [14]
  - Women's doubles: (United States) Nicole Melichar-Martinez / (Australia) Ellen Perez [7], (Czech Republic) Marie Bouzková / (Spain) Sara Sorribes Tormo [12]
- Schedule of Play

Matches on Main Courts
Matches on Rod Laver Arena
Event	Winner	Loser	Score
Women's singles 2nd round	(Poland) Iga Świątek [1]	(United States) Danielle Collins	6–4, 3–6, 6–4
Men's singles 2nd round	(Spain) Carlos Alcaraz [2]	(Italy) Lorenzo Sonego	6–4, 6–7^{(3–7)}, 6–3, 7–6^{(7–3)}
Women's singles 2nd round	Anna Blinkova	(Kazakhstan) Elena Rybakina [3]	6–4, 4–6, 7–6^{(22–20)}
Men's singles 2nd round	Daniil Medvedev [3]	(Finland) Emil Ruusuvuori	3–6, 6–7^{(1–7)}, 6–4, 7–6^{(7–1)}, 6–0
Matches on Margaret Court Arena
Event	Winner	Loser	Score
Men's singles 2nd round	(Norway) Casper Ruud [11]	(Australia) Max Purcell	6–3, 6–7^{(5–7)}, 6–3, 3–6, 7–6^{(10–7)}
Women's singles 2nd round	(France) Clara Burel	(United States) Jessica Pegula [5]	6–4, 6–2
Men's singles 2nd round	(France) Arthur Cazaux [WC]	(Denmark) Holger Rune [8]	7–6^{(7–4)}, 6–4, 4–6, 6–3
Women's singles 2nd round	Victoria Azarenka [18]	(Denmark) Clara Tauson	6–4, 3–6, 6–2
Matches on John Cain Arena
Event	Winner	Loser	Score
Men's singles 2nd round	(Germany) Alexander Zverev [6]	(Slovakia) Lukáš Klein [Q]	7–5, 3–6, 4–6, 7–6^{(7–5)}, 7–6^{(10–7)}
Women's singles 2nd round	(United States) Sloane Stephens	Daria Kasatkina [14]	4–6, 6–3, 6–3
Men's singles 2nd round	(Bulgaria) Grigor Dimitrov [13]	(Australia) Thanasi Kokkinakis	6–3, 6–2, 4–6, 6–4
Women's singles 2nd round	(Latvia) Jeļena Ostapenko [11]	(Australia) Ajla Tomljanović [PR]	6–0, 3–6, 6–4
Matches on Kia Arena
Event	Winner	Loser	Score
Women's singles 2nd round	(Czech Republic) Linda Nosková	(United States) McCartney Kessler [WC]	6–3, 1–6, 6–4
Men's singles 2nd round	(United States) Tommy Paul [14]	(United Kingdom) Jack Draper	6–2, 3–6, 6–3, 7–5
Women's singles 2nd round	(United States) Emma Navarro [27]	(Italy) Elisabetta Cocciaretto	4–6, 6–3, 6–3
Men's singles 2nd round	(Poland) Hubert Hurkacz [9]	(Czech Republic) Jakub Menšík [Q]	6–7^{(9–11)}, 6–1, 5–7, 6–1, 6–3
Matches on 1573 Arena
Event	Winner	Loser	Score
Men's singles 2nd round	(United Kingdom) Cameron Norrie [19]	(Italy) Giulio Zeppieri [Q]	3–6, 6–7^{(4–7)}, 6–2, 6–4, 6–4
Women's singles 2nd round	(China) Zheng Qinwen [12]	(United Kingdom) Katie Boulter	6–3, 6–3
Women's singles 2nd round	(China) Wang Yafan	(United Kingdom) Emma Raducanu [PR]	6–4, 4–6, 6–4
Coloured background indicates a night match
Day matches began at 11 am (12 pm on Rod Laver Arena and Margaret Court Arena), whilst Night matches began at 7 pm AEDT

== Day 6 (19 January) ==
- Seeds out:
  - Men's singles: (United States) Ben Shelton [16], (Argentina) Sebastián Báez [26], (United States) Sebastian Korda [29], (Argentina) Tomás Martín Etcheverry [30]
  - Women's singles: (Brazil) Beatriz Haddad Maia [10], (Ukraine) Lesia Tsurenko [28]
  - Men's doubles: (Croatia) Ivan Dodig / (United States) Austin Krajicek [1], (United Kingdom) Jamie Murray / (New Zealand) Michael Venus [9], (France) Nicolas Mahut / (France) Édouard Roger-Vasselin [13]
  - Women's doubles: (Chinese Taipei) Chan Hao-ching / (Mexico) Giuliana Olmos [10]
- Schedule of Play

Matches on Main Courts
Matches on Rod Laver Arena
Event	Winner	Loser	Score
Women's singles 3rd round	Aryna Sabalenka [2]	(Ukraine) Lesia Tsurenko [28]	6–0, 6–0
Men's singles 3rd round	(Greece) Stefanos Tsitsipas [7]	(France) Luca Van Assche	6–3, 6–0, 6–4
Mixed doubles 1st round	(Germany) Laura Siegemund [5] (Belgium) Sander Gillé [5]	(Australia) Arina Rodionova [WC] (Australia) Max Purcell [WC]	6–2, 6–4
Men's singles 3rd round	(Serbia) Novak Djokovic [1]	(Argentina) Tomás Martín Etcheverry [30]	6–3, 6–3, 7–6^{(7–2)}
Women's singles 3rd round	(Czech Republic) Barbora Krejčíková [9]	(Australia) Storm Hunter [Q]	4–6, 7–5, 6–3
Matches on Margaret Court Arena
Event	Winner	Loser	Score
Men's singles 3rd round	(Italy) Jannik Sinner [4]	(Argentina) Sebastián Báez [26]	6–0, 6–1, 6–3
Women's singles 3rd round	(United States) Coco Gauff [4]	(United States) Alycia Parks	6–0, 6–2
Mixed doubles 1st round	(Canada) Gabriela Dabrowski [6] (United States) Nathaniel Lammons [6]	(Australia) Priscilla Hon [WC] (Australia) Adam Walton [WC]	6–3, 6–2
Women's singles 3rd round	Maria Timofeeva [Q]	(Brazil) Beatriz Haddad Maia [10]	7–6^{(9–7)}, 6–3
Men's singles 3rd round	Andrey Rublev [5]	(United States) Sebastian Korda [29]	6–2, 7–6^{(8–6)}, 6–4
Matches on John Cain Arena
Event	Winner	Loser	Score
Women's singles 3rd round	(United States) Amanda Anisimova [PR]	(Spain) Paula Badosa	7–5, 6–4
Men's singles 3rd round	(United States) Taylor Fritz [12]	(Hungary) Fábián Marozsán	3–6, 6–4, 6–2, 6–2
Men's singles 3rd round	(Australia) Alex de Minaur [10]	(Italy) Flavio Cobolli [Q]	6–3, 6–3, 6–1
Matches on Kia Arena
Event	Winner	Loser	Score
Men's singles 3rd round	Karen Khachanov [15]	(Czech Republic) Tomáš Macháč	6–4, 7–6^{(7–4)}, 4–6, 7–6^{(7–5)}
Women's singles 3rd round	(Poland) Magdalena Fręch	Anastasia Zakharova [Q]	4–6, 7–5, 6–4
Men's singles 3rd round	(France) Adrian Mannarino [20]	(United States) Ben Shelton [16]	7–6^{(7–4)}, 1–6, 6–7^{(2–7)}, 6–3, 6–4
Matches on 1573 Arena
Event	Winner	Loser	Score
Men's doubles 1st Round	(Australia) Max Purcell (Australia) Jordan Thompson	(Austria) Alexander Erler (Austria) Lucas Miedler	6–2, 7–6^{(10–8)}
Men's doubles 2nd Round	(United States) Rajeev Ram [3] (United Kingdom) Joe Salisbury [3]	(Germany) Daniel Altmaier (Mexico) Miguel Ángel Reyes-Varela	6–2, 6–4
Women's singles 3rd round	(Ukraine) Marta Kostyuk	Elina Avanesyan	2–6, 6–4, 6–4
Women's doubles 2nd round	(Chinese Taipei) Hsieh Su-wei [2] (Belgium) Elise Mertens [2]	(Australia) Daria Saville [WC] (Australia) Ajla Tomljanović [WC]	6–1, 6–1
Mixed doubles 1st round	(United Kingdom) Heather Watson [Alt] (United Kingdom) Joe Salisbury [Alt]	(Brazil) Luisa Stefani [WC] (Brazil) Rafael Matos [WC]	6–3, 6–4
Coloured background indicates a night match
Day matches began at 11 am (12 pm on Rod Laver Arena and Margaret Court Arena), whilst Night matches began at 7 pm AEDT

== Day 7 (20 January) ==
- Seeds out:
  - Men's singles: (Norway) Casper Ruud [11], (Bulgaria) Grigor Dimitrov [13], (United States) Tommy Paul [14], (France) Ugo Humbert [21], (Canada) Félix Auger-Aliassime [27], (Netherlands) Tallon Griekspoor [28]
  - Women's singles: (Poland) Iga Świątek [1], (Latvia) Jeļena Ostapenko [11], (United States) Emma Navarro [27]
  - Men's doubles: (Australia) Rinky Hijikata / (Australia) Jason Kubler [16]
  - Women's doubles: (Japan) Eri Hozumi / (Japan) Makoto Ninomiya [16]
  - Mixed doubles: (Chinese Taipei) Chan Hao-ching / (Mexico) Santiago González [4]
- Schedule of Play

Matches on Main Courts
Matches on Rod Laver Arena
Event	Winner	Loser	Score
Women's singles 3rd round	(China) Zheng Qinwen [12]	(China) Wang Yafan	6–4, 2–6, 7–6^{(10–8)}
Men's singles 3rd round	(Spain) Carlos Alcaraz [2]	(China) Shang Juncheng [WC]	6–1, 6–1, 1–0 retired
Women's singles 3rd round	(Czech Republic) Linda Nosková	(Poland) Iga Świątek [1]	3–6, 6–3, 6–4
Men's singles 3rd round	(Germany) Alexander Zverev [6]	(United States) Alex Michelsen	6–2, 7–6^{(7–4)}, 6–2
Matches on Margaret Court Arena
Event	Winner	Loser	Score
Men's singles 3rd round	(Serbia) Miomir Kecmanović	(United States) Tommy Paul [14]	6–4, 3–6, 2–6, 7–6^{(9–7)}, 6–0
Women's singles 3rd round	Victoria Azarenka [18]	(Latvia) Jeļena Ostapenko [11]	6–1, 7–5
Men's singles 3rd round	Daniil Medvedev [3]	(Canada) Félix Auger-Aliassime [27]	6–3, 6–4, 6–3
Women's singles 3rd round	(Ukraine) Elina Svitolina [19]	(Switzerland) Viktorija Golubic	6–2, 6–3
Matches on John Cain Arena
Event	Winner	Loser	Score
Women's singles 3rd round	(Ukraine) Dayana Yastremska [Q]	(United States) Emma Navarro [27]	6–2, 2–6, 6–1
Men's singles 3rd round	(Poland) Hubert Hurkacz [9]	(France) Ugo Humbert [21]	3–6, 6–1, 7–6^{(7–4)}, 6–3
Men's singles 3rd round	(United Kingdom) Cameron Norrie [19]	(Norway) Casper Ruud [11]	6–4, 6–7^{(7–9)}, 6–4, 6–3
Matches on Kia Arena
Event	Winner	Loser	Score
Women's singles 3rd round	Anna Kalinskaya	(United States) Sloane Stephens	6–7^{(8–10)}, 6–1, 6–4
Women's singles 3rd round	(Italy) Jasmine Paolini [26]	Anna Blinkova	7–6^{(7–1)}, 6–4
Mixed doubles 1st round	(Australia) Olivia Gadecki [WC] (Australia) Marc Polmans [WC]	(Chinese Taipei) Chan Hao-ching [4] (Mexico) Santiago González [4]	6–4, 6–7^{(5–7)}, [12–10]
Men's singles 3rd round	(Portugal) Nuno Borges	(Bulgaria) Grigor Dimitrov [13]	6–7^{(3–7)}, 6–4, 6–2, 7–6^{(8–6)}
Matches on 1573 Arena
Event	Winner	Loser	Score
Men's doubles 2nd Round	(United Kingdom) Lloyd Glasspool [11] (Netherlands) Jean-Julien Rojer [11]	(Sweden) André Göransson (France) Albano Olivetti	7–6^{(7–3)}, 4–6, 6–2
Men's doubles 2nd Round	(Monaco) Hugo Nys [7] (Poland) Jan Zieliński [7]	(Australia) Max Purcell (Australia) Jordan Thompson	6–3, 6–7^{(5–7)}, 6–1
Men's doubles 2nd Round	(Spain) Marcel Granollers [4] (Argentina) Horacio Zeballos [4]	(Germany) Andreas Mies (Australia) John-Patrick Smith	6–4, 6–4
Women's doubles 2nd round	(Australia) Storm Hunter [3] (Czech Republic) Kateřina Siniaková [3]	(Australia) Destanee Aiava [WC] (Australia) Maddison Inglis [WC]	2–6, 7–5, 6–1
Coloured background indicates a night match
Day matches began at 11 am (12 pm on Rod Laver Arena and Margaret Court Arena), whilst Night matches began at 7 pm AEDT

== Day 8 (21 January) ==
- Seeds out:
  - Men's singles: (Greece) Stefanos Tsitsipas [7], (Australia) Alex de Minaur [10], Karen Khachanov [15], (France) Adrian Mannarino [20]
  - Men's doubles: (United States) Rajeev Ram / (United Kingdom) Joe Salisbury [3], (El Salvador) Marcelo Arévalo / (Croatia) Mate Pavić [10], (United States) Nathaniel Lammons / (United States) Jackson Withrow [12]
- Schedule of Play

Matches on Main Courts
Matches on Rod Laver Arena
Event	Winner	Loser	Score
Women's singles 4th round	(United States) Coco Gauff [4]	(Poland) Magdalena Fręch	6–1, 6–2
Men's singles 4th round	(Serbia) Novak Djokovic [1]	(France) Adrian Mannarino [20]	6–0, 6–0, 6–3
Mixed doubles 1st round	(Japan) Ena Shibahara (Belgium) Joran Vliegen	(United States) Bethanie Mattek-Sands [Alt] (El Salvador) Marcelo Arévalo [Alt]	6–3, 7–6^{(7–0)}
Men's singles 4th round	Andrey Rublev [5]	(Australia) Alex de Minaur [10]	6–4, 6–7^{(5–7)}, 6–7^{(4–7)}, 6–3, 6–0
Matches on Margaret Court Arena
Event	Winner	Loser	Score
Women's legends doubles 1st Round	(Slovakia) Daniela Hantuchová (China) Li Na	(Australia) Casey Dellacqua (Australia) Alicia Molik	7–5, 6–1
Women's singles 4th round	Aryna Sabalenka [2]	(United States) Amanda Anisimova [PR]	6–3, 6–2
Men's singles 4th round	(Italy) Jannik Sinner [4]	Karen Khachanov [15]	6–4, 7–5, 6–3
Women's doubles 3rd round	(Canada) Gabriela Dabrowski [4] (New Zealand) Erin Routliffe [4]	(China) Guo Hanyu (China) Jiang Xinyu	4–6, 6–1, 6–3
Matches on John Cain Arena
Event	Winner	Loser	Score
Men's doubles 3rd round	(Argentina) Máximo González [6] (Argentina) Andrés Molteni [6]	(United States) Nathaniel Lammons [12] (United States) Jackson Withrow [12]	7–6^{(7–5)}, 3–6, 7–6^{(10–5)}
Men's singles 4th round	(United States) Taylor Fritz [12]	(Greece) Stefanos Tsitsipas [7]	7–6^{(7–3)}, 5–7, 6–3, 6–3
Women's singles 4th round	(Czech Republic) Barbora Krejčiková [9]	Mirra Andreeva	4–6, 6–3, 6–2
Women's doubles 3rd round	(France) Caroline Garcia (France) Kristina Mladenovic	(Germany) Tamara Korpatsch [Alt] (France) Elixane Lechemia [Alt]	3–6, 7–5, 6–0
Matches on Kia Arena
Event	Winner	Loser	Score
Men's legends doubles 1st Round	(Germany) Tommy Haas (Czech Republic) Radek Štěpánek	(Cyprus) Marcos Baghdatis (Australia) Mark Philippoussis	6–2, 7–5
Women's singles 4th round	(Ukraine) Marta Kostyuk	Maria Timofeeva [Q]	6–2, 6–1
Women's doubles 3rd round	(Australia) Storm Hunter [3] (Czech Republic) Katerina Siniaková [3]	Ekaterina Alexandrova; Anna Kalinskaya	6–2, 6–2
Men's doubles 3rd round	(Czech Republic) Tomáš Macháč (China) Zhang Zhizhen	(United States) Rajeev Ram [3] (United Kingdom) Joe Salisbury [3]	3–6, 6–3, 6–2
Mixed doubles 1st round	(Australia) Storm Hunter [1] (Australia) Matthew Ebden [1]	(Ukraine) Lyudmyla Kichenok (Croatia) Mate Pavić	6–3, 6–2
Matches on 1573 Arena
Event	Winner	Loser	Score
Men's doubles 3rd round	(Germany) Kevin Krawietz [8] (Germany) Tim Pütz [8]	(El Salvador) Marcelo Arévalo [10] (Croatia) Mate Pavić [10]	6–3, 6–3
Men's doubles 3rd round	(Italy) Simone Bolelli (Italy) Andrea Vavassori	(Serbia) Nikola Ćaćić (Ukraine) Denys Molchanov	6–2, 6–2
Women's doubles 3rd round	(Chinese Taipei) Hsieh Su-wei [2] (Belgium) Elise Mertens [2]	(Italy) Sara Errani (Italy) Jasmine Paolini	3–6, 6–3, 7–5
Mixed doubles 2nd round	(United States) Nicole Melichar-Martinez [7] (Germany) Kevin Krawietz [7]	Liudmila Samsonova (Italy) Andrea Vavassori	7–6^{(10–8)}, 6–2
Mixed doubles 2nd round	(United States) Desirae Krawczyk [2] (United Kingdom) Neal Skupski [2]	Veronika Kudermetova (United Kingdom) Lloyd Glasspool	7–5, 5–7, [10–7]
Coloured background indicates a night match
Day matches began at 11 am (12 pm on Rod Laver Arena and Margaret Court Arena), whilst Night matches began at 7 pm AEDT

== Day 9 (22 January) ==
- Seeds out:
  - Men's singles: (United Kingdom) Cameron Norrie [19]
  - Women's singles: Victoria Azarenka [18], (Ukraine) Elina Svitolina [19], (Italy) Jasmine Paolini [26]
  - Men's doubles: (Spain) Marcel Granollers / (Argentina) Horacio Zeballos [4], (Mexico) Santiago González / (United Kingdom) Neal Skupski [5], (United Kingdom) Lloyd Glasspool / (Netherlands) Jean-Julien Rojer [11], (Netherlands) Wesley Koolhof / (Croatia) Nikola Mektić [14]
  - Women's doubles: (United States) Desirae Krawczyk / (Japan) Ena Shibahara [6], (Brazil) Beatriz Haddad Maia / (United States) Taylor Townsend [8]
  - Mixed doubles: (Australia) Storm Hunter / (Australia) Matthew Ebden [1], (Australia) Ellen Perez / (Netherlands) Jean-Julien Rojer [8]
- Schedule of Play

Matches on Main Courts
Matches on Rod Laver Arena
Event	Winner	Loser	Score
Women's singles 4th round	(Ukraine) Dayana Yastremska [Q]	Victoria Azarenka [18]	7–6^{(8–6)}, 6–4
Men's singles 4th round	Daniil Medvedev [3]	(Portugal) Nuno Borges	6–3, 7–6^{(7–4)}, 5–7, 6–1
Men's singles 4th round	(Spain) Carlos Alcaraz [2]	(Serbia) Miomir Kecmanović	6–4, 6–4, 6–0
Women's singles 4th round	(China) Zheng Qinwen [12]	(France) Océane Dodin	6–0, 6–3
Matches on Margaret Court Arena
Event	Winner	Loser	Score
Mixed Legends' doubles 1st round	(Slovenia) Daniela Hantuchová (Germany) Tommy Haas	(China) Li Na (Sweden) Thomas Johansson	6–4, 6–4
Women's singles 4th round	(Czech Republic) Linda Nosková	(Ukraine) Elina Svitolina [19]	3–0 retired
Women's doubles 3rd round	(Czech Republic) Barbora Krejčíková [5] (Germany) Laura Siegemund [5]	(United States) Emma Navarro; Diana Shnaider	6–4, 6–0
Men's singles 4th round	(Germany) Alexander Zverev [6]	(United Kingdom) Cameron Norrie [19]	7–5, 3–6, 6–4, 4–6, 7–6^{(10–3)}
Matches on John Cain Arena
Event	Winner	Loser	Score
Mixed Legends' doubles 1st round	(Germany) Andrea Petkovic (Sweden) Robert Lindstedt	(Croatia) Iva Majoli (Czech Republic) Radek Štěpánek	6–3, 6–4
Men's doubles 3rd round	(Uruguay) Ariel Behar (Czech Republic) Adam Pavlásek	(Mexico) Santiago González [5] (United Kingdom) Neal Skupski [5]	3–6, 7–6^{(7–1)}, 6–4
Men's singles 4th round	(Poland) Hubert Hurkacz [9]	(France) Arthur Cazaux [WC]	7–6^{(8–6)}, 7–6^{(7–3)}, 6–4
Women's singles 4th round	Anna Kalinskaya	(Italy) Jasmine Paolini [26]	6–4, 6–2
Matches on Kia Arena
Event	Winner	Loser	Score
Women's doubles 3rd round	(Spain) Cristina Bucșa; Alexandra Panova	(Brazil) Beatriz Haddad Maia [8] (United States) Taylor Townsend [8]	6–2, 6–4
Men's doubles 3rd round	(Monaco) Hugo Nys [7] (Poland) Jan Zieliński [7]	(United Kingdom) Lloyd Glasspool [11] (Netherlands) Jean-Julien Rojer [11]	3–6, 6–4, 7–6^{(10–3)}
Men's doubles 3rd round	(India) Rohan Bopanna [2] (Australia) Matthew Ebden [2]	(Netherlands) Wesley Koolhof [14] (Croatia) Nikola Mektić [14]	7–6^{(10–8)}, 7–6^{(7–4)}
Mixed doubles 2nd round	(United Kingdom) Heather Watson [Alt] (United Kingdom) Joe Salisbury [Alt]	(Australia) Ellen Perez [8] (Netherlands) Jean-Julien Rojer [8]	6–3, 6–2
Mixed doubles 2nd round	(Chinese Taipei) Hsieh Su-wei [3] (Poland) Jan Zieliński [3]	(Netherlands) Demi Schuurs (Monaco) Hugo Nys	6–3, 6–2
Matches on 1573 Arena
Event	Winner	Loser	Score
Girls' singles 2nd round	(United Kingdom) Hannah Klugman [4]	(Australia) Alana Subasic [Q]	6–1, 6–2
Boys' singles 2nd round	(Poland) Tomasz Berkieta [3]	(Brazil) Enzo Kolhmann de Freitas	7–6^{(7–1)}, 3–6, 6–2
Boys' singles 2nd round	(Netherlands) Mees Röttgering	(Czech Republic) Maxim Mrva [7]	6–1, 6–3
Boys' doubles 1st round	(Australia) Hayden Jones [3] (United States) Alexander Razeghi [3]	(Australia) Cruz Hewitt [WC] (Australia) Lachlan McFadzean [WC]	6–0, 7–6^{(7–5)}
Mixed doubles 2nd round	(Australia) Olivia Gadecki [WC] (Australia) Marc Polmans [WC]	(Indonesia) Aldila Sutjiadi (New Zealand) Michael Venus	5–7, 6–3, [10–6]
Mixed doubles 2nd round	(Germany) Laura Siegemund [5] (Belgium) Sander Gillé [5]	(Japan) Ena Shibahara (Belgium) Joran Vliegen	6–4, 6–4
Coloured background indicates a night match
Day matches began at 11 am (12 pm on Rod Laver Arena and Margaret Court Arena), whilst Night matches began at 7 pm AEDT

== Day 10 (23 January) ==
- Seeds out:
  - Men's singles: Andrey Rublev [5], (United States) Taylor Fritz [12]
  - Women's singles: (Czech Republic) Barbora Krejčíková [9]
  - Mixed doubles: (Germany) Laura Siegemund / (Belgium) Sander Gillé [5], (Canada) Gabriela Dabrowski / (United States) Nathaniel Lammons [6], (United States) Nicole Melichar-Martinez / (Germany) Kevin Krawietz [7]
- Schedule of Play

Matches on Main Courts
Matches on Rod Laver Arena
Event	Winner	Loser	Score
Men's Legends' doubles 1st round	(Cyprus) Marcos Baghdatis (Australia) Mark Philippoussis	(Sweden) Thomas Johansson (Sweden) Robert Lindstedt	6–2, 6–3
Women's singles Quarterfinals	(United States) Coco Gauff [4]	(Ukraine) Marta Kostyuk	7–6^{(8–6)}, 6–7^{(3–7)}, 6–2
Men's singles Quarterfinals	(Serbia) Novak Djokovic [1]	(United States) Taylor Fritz [12]	7–6^{(7–3)}, 4–6, 6–2, 6–3
Women's singles Quarterfinals	Aryna Sabalenka [2]	(Czech Republic) Barbora Krejčíková [9]	6–2, 6–3
Men's singles Quarterfinals	(Italy) Jannik Sinner [4]	Andrey Rublev [5]	6–4, 7–6^{(7–5)}, 6–3
Matches on Margaret Court Arena
Event	Winner	Loser	Score
Men's doubles Quarterfinals	(Czech Republic) Tomáš Macháč (China) Zhang Zhizhen	(Uruguay) Ariel Behar (Czech Republic) Adam Pavlásek	6–3, 6–1
Women's doubles Quarterfinals	(Canada) Gabriela Dabrowski [4] (New Zealand) Erin Routliffe [4]	(Spain) Cristina Bucsa; Alexandra Panova	7–5, 6–2
Mixed doubles Quarterfinals	(Chinese Taipei) Hsieh Su-wei [3] (Poland) Jan Zieliński [3]	(United States) Nicole Melichar-Martinez [7] (Germany) Kevin Krawietz [7]	6–2, 6–3
Mixed doubles Quarterfinals	(Australia) Olivia Gadecki [WC] (Australia) Marc Polmans [WC]	(Canada) Gabriela Dabrowski [6] (United States) Nathaniel Lammons [6]	6–4, 7–6^{(9–7)}
Matches on Kia Arena
Event	Winner	Loser	Score
Women's Legends' doubles 1st round	(Australia) Casey Dellacqua (Australia) Alicia Molik	(Croatia) Iva Majoli (Germany) Andrea Petkovic	6–4, 6–2
Women's doubles Quarterfinals	(Ukraine) Lyudmyla Kichenok [11] (Latvia) Jeļena Ostapenko [11]	(France) Caroline Garcia (France) Kristina Mladenovic	7–6^{(7–2)}, 6–4
Mixed doubles Quarterfinals	(United States) Desirae Krawczyk [2] (United Kingdom) Neal Skupski [2]	(United Kingdom) Heather Watson [Alt] (United Kingdom) Joe Salisbury [Alt]	6–1, 6–4
Mixed doubles Quarterfinals	(Australia) Jaimee Fourlis [WC] (Australia) Adam Harris [WC]	(Germany) Laura Siegemund [5] (Belgium) Sander Gillé [5]	7–5, 7–5
Coloured background indicates a night match
Day matches begin at 11 am (12 pm on Rod Laver Arena and Margaret Court Arena), whilst Night matches begin at 7 pm AEDT

== Day 11 (24 January) ==
- Seeds out:
  - Men's singles: (Spain) Carlos Alcaraz [2], (Poland) Hubert Hurkacz [9]
  - Men's doubles: (Argentina) Máximo González / (Argentina) Andrés Molteni [6], (Monaco) Hugo Nys / (Poland) Jan Zieliński [7], (Germany) Kevin Krawietz / (Germany) Tim Pütz [8]
  - Women's doubles: (Czech Republic) Barbora Krejčíková / (Germany) Laura Siegemund [5], (Netherlands) Demi Schuurs / (Brazil) Luisa Stefani [9]
- Schedule of Play

Matches on Main Courts
Matches on Rod Laver Arena
Event	Winner	Loser	Score
Women's singles Quarterfinals	(Ukraine) Dayana Yastremska [Q]	(Czech Republic) Linda Nosková	6–3, 6–4
Men's singles Quarterfinals	Daniil Medvedev [3]	(Poland) Hubert Hurkacz [9]	7–6^{(7–2)}, 2–6, 6–3, 5–7, 6–4
Women's singles Quarterfinals	(China) Zheng Qinwen [12]	Anna Kalinskaya	6–7^{(4–7)}, 6–3, 6–1
Men's singles Quarterfinals	(Germany) Alexander Zverev [6]	(Spain) Carlos Alcaraz [2]	6–1, 6–3, 6–7^{(2–7)}, 6–4
Matches on Margaret Court Arena
Event	Winner	Loser	Score
Men's doubles Quarterfinals	(India) Rohan Bopanna [2] (Australia) Matthew Ebden [2]	(Argentina) Máximo González [6] (Argentina) Andrés Molteni [6]	6–4, 7–6^{(7–5)}
Men's doubles Quarterfinals	(Germany) Yannick Hanfmann (Germany) Dominik Koepfer	(Monaco) Hugo Nys [7] (Poland) Jan Zieliński [7]	6–4, 7–6^{(7–3)}
Women's doubles Quarterfinals	(Australia) Storm Hunter [3] (Czech Republic) Kateřina Siniaková [3]	(Czech Republic) Barbora Krejčíková [5] (Germany) Laura Siegemund [5]	4–6, 7–5, 6–4
Mixed doubles Semifinals	(United States) Desirae Krawczyk [2] (United Kingdom) Neal Skupski [2]	(Australia) Olivia Gadecki [WC] (Australia) Marc Polmans [WC]	6–4, 6–1
Matches on Kia Arena
Event	Winner	Loser	Score
Wheelchair Men's singles Quarterfinals	(Japan) Tokito Oda [2]	(France) Stéphane Houdet	6–3, 6–1
Wheelchair Women's singles Quarterfinals	(Netherlands) Diede de Groot [1]	(Netherlands) Aniek van Koot	3–6, 6–1, 6–0
Wheelchair Quad doubles Quarterfinals	(Australia) Heath Davidson [2] (Canada) Robert Shaw [2]	(Australia) Finn Broadbent (United Kingdom) Gregory Slade	6–0, 6–0
Wheelchair Men's doubles Quarterfinals	(United Kingdom) Alfie Hewett [1] (United Kingdom) Gordon Reid [1]	(Australia) Anderson Parker (Australia) Ben Weekes	6–1, 6–0
Mixed doubles Semifinals	(Chinese Taipei) Hsieh Su-wei [3] (Poland) Jan Zieliński [3]	(Australia) Jaimee Fourlis [WC] (Australia) Andrew Harris [WC]	7–6^{(10–8)}, 6–2
Matches on 1573 Arena
Event	Winner	Loser	Score
Girls' singles 3rd round	(Slovakia) Renáta Jamrichová [1]	(Australia) Maya Joint	6–4, 6–3
Women's doubles Quarterfinals	(Chinese Taipei) Hsieh Su-wei [2] (Belgium) Elise Mertens [2]	(Netherlands) Demi Schuurs [9] (Brazil) Luisa Stefani [9]	6–4, 6–2
Men's doubles Quarterfinals	(Italy) Simone Bolelli (Italy) Andrea Vavassori	(Germany) Kevin Krawietz [8] (Germany) Tim Pütz [8]	7–5, 6–4
Coloured background indicates a night match
Day matches began at 11 am (12 pm on Rod Laver Arena and Margaret Court Arena), whilst Night matches began at 7:15 pm AEDT

== Day 12 (25 January) ==
- Seeds out:
  - Women's singles: (United States) Coco Gauff [4]
  - Women's doubles: (Australia) Storm Hunter / (Czech Republic) Kateřina Siniaková [3]
- Schedule of Play

Matches on Main Courts
Matches on Rod Laver Arena
Event	Winner	Loser	Score
Women's legends doubles 1st Round	(Slovakia) Daniela Hantuchová (China) Li Na	(Croatia) Iva Majoli (Germany) Andrea Petkovic	6–1, 6–2
Men's doubles Semifinals	(India) Rohan Bopanna [2] (Australia) Matthew Ebden [2]	(Czech Republic) Tomáš Macháč (China) Zhang Zhizhen	6–3, 3–6, 7–6^{(10–7)}
Men's doubles Semifinals	(Italy) Simone Bolelli (Italy) Andrea Vavassori	(Germany) Yannick Hanfmann (Germany) Dominik Koepfer	6–3, 3–6, 7–6^{(10–5)}
Women's singles Semifinals	Aryna Sabalenka [2]	(United States) Coco Gauff [4]	7–6^{(7–2)}, 6–4
Women's singles Semifinals	(China) Zheng Qinwen [12]	(Ukraine) Dayana Yastremska [Q]	6–4, 6–4
Matches on Margaret Court Arena
Event	Winner	Loser	Score
Men's legends doubles 1st Round	(Germany) Tommy Haas (Czech Republic) Radek Štěpánek	(Sweden) Thomas Johansson (Sweden) Robert Lindstedt	3–6, 6–3, [10–8]
Mixed legends doubles 1st Round	(Australia) Casey Dellacqua (Australia) Mark Philippoussis	(Australia) Alicia Molik (Cyprus) Marcos Baghdatis	4–6, 6–2, [10–7]
Women's doubles Semifinals	(Chinese Taipei) Hsieh Su-wei [2] (Belgium) Elise Mertens [2]	(Australia) Storm Hunter [3] (Czech Republic) Kateřina Siniaková [3]	7–5, 1–6, 6–3
Boys' singles Quarterfinals	(Netherlands) Mees Röttgering	(Kazakhstan) Amir Omarkhanov	6–2, 6–0
Girls' singles Quarterfinals	(Japan) Ena Koike [10]	Vlada Mincheva [15]	7–6^{(8–6)}, 6–0
Coloured background indicates a night match
Day matches began at 12 pm, whilst Night matches began at 7:30 pm AEDT

== Day 13 (26 January) ==
- Seeds out:
  - Men's singles: (Serbia) Novak Djokovic [1], (Germany) Alexander Zverev [6]
  - Women's doubles: (Canada) Gabriela Dabrowski / (New Zealand) Erin Routliffe [4]
  - Mixed doubles: (United States) Desirae Krawczyk / (United Kingdom) Neal Skupski [2]
- Schedule of Play

Matches on Main Courts
Matches on Rod Laver Arena
Event	Winner	Loser	Score
Mixed doubles Final	(Chinese Taipei) Hsieh Su-wei [3] (Poland) Jan Zieliński [3]	(United States) Desirae Krawczyk [2] (United Kingdom) Neal Skupski [2]	6–7^{(5–7)}, 6–4, [11–9]
Men's singles Semifinals	(Italy) Jannik Sinner [4]	(Serbia) Novak Djokovic [1]	6–1, 6–2, 6–7^{(6–8)}, 6–3
Men's singles Semifinals	Daniil Medvedev [3]	(Germany) Alexander Zverev [6]	5–7, 3–6, 7–6^{(7–4)}, 7–6^{(7–5)}, 6–3
Matches on Margaret Court Arena
Event	Winner	Loser	Score
Wheelchair Quad doubles Semifinals	(United Kingdom) Andy Lapthorne (United States) David Wagner	(Australia) Heath Davidson [2] (Canada) Robert Shaw [2]	6–3, 6–2
Wheelchair men's doubles Semifinals	(United Kingdom) Alfie Hewett [1] (United Kingdom) Gordon Reid [1]	(Japan) Daisuke Arai (Japan) Takashi Sanada	6–3, 6–3
Women's doubles Semifinals	(Ukraine) Lyudmyla Kichenok [11] (Latvia) Jeļena Ostapenko [11]	(Canada) Gabriela Dabrowski [4] (New Zealand) Erin Routliffe [4]	7–5, 7–5
Wheelchair Quad doubles Final	(United Kingdom) Andy Lapthorne (United States) David Wagner	(South Africa) Donald Ramphadi (Israel) Guy Sasson	6–4, 3–6, [10–2]
Matches on Kia Arena
Event	Winner	Loser	Score
Wheelchair Women's doubles Semifinals	(Japan) Yui Kamiji [1] (South Africa) Kgothatso Montjane [1]	(Colombia) Angélica Bernal (China) Zhu Zhenzhen	6–4, 6–3
Wheelchair Men's doubles Semifinals	(Japan) Takuya Miki (Japan) Tokito Oda	(Belgium) Joachim Gérard [2] (France) Stéphane Houdet [2]	6–4, 6–3
Wheelchair Women's doubles Final	(Netherlands) Diede de Groot [2] (Netherlands) Jiske Griffioen [2]	(Japan) Yui Kamiji [1] (South Africa) Kgothatso Montjane [1]	6–3, 7–6^{(7–2)}
Wheelchair Men's doubles Final	(United Kingdom) Alfie Hewett [1] (United Kingdom) Gordon Reid [1]	(Japan) Takuya Miki (Japan) Tokito Oda	6–3, 6–2
Coloured background indicates a night match
Day matches began at 12 pm, whilst Night matches began at 7:30 pm AEDT

== Day 14 (27 January) ==
- Seeds out:
  - Women's singles: (China) Zheng Qinwen [12]
- Schedule of Play

Matches on Main Courts
Matches on Rod Laver Arena
Event	Winner	Loser	Score
Girls' singles Final	(Slovakia) Renáta Jamrichová [1]	(Australia) Emerson Jones [6]	6–4, 6–1
Boys' singles Final	(Japan) Rei Sakamoto [4]	(Czech Republic) Jan Kumstát	3–6, 7–6^{(7–2)}, 7–5
Women's singles Final	Aryna Sabalenka [2]	(China) Zheng Qinwen [12]	6–3, 6–2
Men's doubles Final	(India) Rohan Bopanna [2] (Australia) Matthew Ebden [2]	(Italy) Simone Bolelli (Italy) Andrea Vavassori	7–6^{(7–0)}, 7–5
Matches on Kia Arena
Event	Winner	Loser	Score
Wheelchair Women's singles Final	(Netherlands) Diede de Groot [1]	(Japan) Yui Kamiji [2]	7–5, 6–4
Wheelchair Quad singles Final	(Netherlands) Sam Schröder [2]	(Israel) Guy Sasson [4]	6–3, 6–3
Wheelchair Men's singles Final	(Japan) Tokito Oda [2]	(United Kingdom) Alfie Hewett [1]	6–2, 6–4
Coloured background indicates a night match
Day matches began at 12 pm, whilst Night matches began at 7:30 pm AEDT

== Day 15 (28 January) ==
- Seeds out:
  - Men's singles: Daniil Medvedev [3]
  - Women's doubles: (Ukraine) Lyudmyla Kichenok / (Latvia) Jeļena Ostapenko [11]
- Schedule of Play

Matches on Main Courts
Matches on Rod Laver Arena
Event	Winner	Loser	Score
Women's doubles Final	(Chinese Taipei) Hsieh Su-wei [2] (Belgium) Elise Mertens [2]	(Ukraine) Lyudmyla Kichenok [11] (Latvia) Jeļena Ostapenko [11]	6–1, 7–5
Men's singles Final	(Italy) Jannik Sinner [4]	Daniil Medvedev [3]	3–6, 3–6, 6–4, 6–4, 6–3
Matches began at 3 pm AEDT
