= 2024 Australian Open – Men's singles qualifying =

Men's singles qualifying
- 2024 Australian Open

Events
Singles	men	women		boys	girls
Doubles	men	women	mixed	boys	girls
WC Singles	men	women	quad	boys	girls
WC Doubles	men	women	quad	boys	girls

Qualification
Singles	men	women
- Australian Open

The 2024 Australian Open – Men's singles qualifying is a series of tennis matches that took place from 9 to 12 January 2024 (was originally to start on 8 January, however, it was rescheduled due to rain on the first day) to determine the sixteen qualifiers into the main draw of the men's singles tournament, and, if necessary, the lucky losers.

== Seeds ==
1. (France) Quentin Halys (moved to main draw)
2. (Italy) Flavio Cobolli (qualified)
3. (Chile) Tomás Barrios Vera (first round)
4. (France) Hugo Gaston (qualifying competition, lucky loser)
5. (United States) Michael Mmoh (first round)
6. (Spain) Pedro Martínez (first round)
7. (United States) Aleksandar Kovacevic (qualified)
8. (Belgium) David Goffin (qualified)
9. (Bolivia) Hugo Dellien (second round)
10. (Serbia) Hamad Medjedovic (second round)
11. (Argentina) Diego Schwartzman (first round)
12. (France) Benoît Paire (first round)
13. (Italy) Luca Nardi (second round)
14. (Slovakia) Alex Molčan (qualifying competition)
15. (Argentina) Juan Manuel Cerúndolo (first round)
16. (Argentina) Thiago Agustín Tirante (first round)
17. (Argentina) Francisco Comesaña (second round)
18. (Argentina) Mariano Navone (first round)
19. (United States) Maxime Cressy (second round)
20. (Hungary) Zsombor Piros (second round)
21. (Italy) Luciano Darderi (first round)
22. (Belgium) Zizou Bergs (qualifying competition, retired, lucky loser)
23. (Moldova) Radu Albot (first round)
24. (Czech Republic) Vít Kopřiva (qualified)
25. (United States) Brandon Nakashima (first round)
26. (Italy) Giulio Zeppieri (qualified)
27. (Japan) Shintaro Mochizuki (qualifying competition, lucky loser)
28. (India) Sumit Nagal (qualified)
29. (Canada) Gabriel Diallo (qualifying competition)
30. (South Africa) Lloyd Harris (qualified)
31. (Argentina) Camilo Ugo Carabelli (qualifying competition)
32. (United States) Zachary Svajda (second round)

== Qualifiers ==
1. (Croatia) Dino Prižmić
2. (Italy) Flavio Cobolli
3. (France) Hugo Grenier
4. (South Africa) Lloyd Harris
5. (Netherlands) Jesper de Jong
6. (Czech Republic) Vít Kopřiva
7. (United States) Aleksandar Kovacevic
8. (Belgium) David Goffin
9. (Czech Republic) Jakub Menšík
10. (Australia) Omar Jasika
11. (Slovakia) Lukáš Klein
12. (Italy) Giulio Zeppieri
13. (Australia) Dane Sweeny
14. (India) Sumit Nagal
15. (France) Térence Atmane
16. (Hungary) Máté Valkusz

== Lucky losers ==
1. (France) Hugo Gaston
2. (Japan) Shintaro Mochizuki
3. (Belgium) Zizou Bergs

== Draw ==
=== First qualifier ===
First round
Alt	(Argentina) Facundo Bagnis	6^{4}	3
(Tunisia) Aziz Dougaz	7^{7}	6
(United Kingdom) Ryan Peniston	6	4	7^{10}
(Sweden) Elias Ymer	1	6	6^{7}
(France) Ugo Blanchet	4	2
(Croatia) Duje Ajduković	6	6
(Croatia) Dino Prižmić	5	6	6
18	(Argentina) Mariano Navone	7	3	2

Second round
(Tunisia) Aziz Dougaz	6	6
(United Kingdom) Ryan Peniston	3	2
(Croatia) Duje Ajduković	5	0
(Croatia) Dino Prižmić	7	6

Qualifying competition
(Tunisia) Aziz Dougaz	3	4
(Croatia) Dino Prižmić	6	6

=== Second qualifier ===
First round
2	(Italy) Flavio Cobolli	6	6
WC	(Australia) Jeremy Jin	2	2
(United Kingdom) Jan Choinski	4	0
(Germany) Benjamin Hassan	6	6
(Argentina) Santiago Rodríguez Taverna	6	7^{8}
(France) Antoine Escoffier	4	6^{6}
(Italy) Andrea Pellegrino	7^{7}	2	1
20	(Hungary) Zsombor Piros	6^{5}	6	6

Second round
2	(Italy) Flavio Cobolli	6	6
(Germany) Benjamin Hassan	4	3
(Argentina) Santiago Rodríguez Taverna	6	3	7^{10}
20	(Hungary) Zsombor Piros	2	6	6^{8}

Qualifying competition
2	(Italy) Flavio Cobolli	6	6
(Argentina) Santiago Rodríguez Taverna	4	2

=== Third qualifier ===
First round
3	(Chile) Tomás Barrios Vera	3	6^{8}
(France) Giovanni Mpetshi Perricard	6	7^{10}
(Austria) Filip Misolic	6	4	3
(Switzerland) Marc-Andrea Hüsler	3	6	6
(Estonia) Mark Lajal	4	2
(France) Hugo Grenier	6	6
(Chinese Taipei) Hsu Yu-hsiou	2	1
19	(United States) Maxime Cressy	6	6

Second round
(France) Giovanni Mpetshi Perricard	7^{7}	3	7
(Switzerland) Marc-Andrea Hüsler	6^{3}	6	5
(France) Hugo Grenier	4	6	6
19	(United States) Maxime Cressy	6	2	3

Qualifying competition
(France) Giovanni Mpetshi Perricard	7	4	6^{4}
(France) Hugo Grenier	5	6	7^{10}

=== Fourth qualifier ===
First round
4	(France) Hugo Gaston	7	6
(China) Bu Yunchaokete	5	0
(Kazakhstan) Beibit Zhukayev	6	6
PR	(Argentina) Nicolás Kicker	1	4
(France) Enzo Couacaud	3	6	2
(France) Kyrian Jacquet	6	2	6
(Spain) Daniel Rincón	2	2
30	(South Africa) Lloyd Harris	6	6

Second round
4	(France) Hugo Gaston	7^{7}	6
(Kazakhstan) Beibit Zhukayev	6^{3}	3
(France) Kyrian Jacquet	5	4
30	(South Africa) Lloyd Harris	7	6

Qualifying competition
4	(France) Hugo Gaston	0	2
30	(South Africa) Lloyd Harris	6	6

=== Fifth qualifier ===
First round
5	(United States) Michael Mmoh	1	3
(Brazil) Felipe Meligeni Alves	6	6
(Italy) Raúl Brancaccio	1	2
(Netherlands) Jesper de Jong	6	6
(Italy) Riccardo Bonadio	7	7^{7}
WC	(Australia) Pavle Marinkov	5	6^{2}
WC	(Australia) Hayden Jones	0	6	2
31	(Argentina) Camilo Ugo Carabelli	6	3	6

Second round
(Brazil) Felipe Meligeni Alves	6^{5}	1
(Netherlands) Jesper de Jong	7^{7}	6
(Italy) Riccardo Bonadio	1	4
31	(Argentina) Camilo Ugo Carabelli	6	6

Qualifying competition
(Netherlands) Jesper de Jong	7^{7}	3	7^{10}
31	(Argentina) Camilo Ugo Carabelli	6^{3}	6	6^{7}

=== Sixth qualifier ===
First round
6	(Spain) Pedro Martínez	3	2
(Italy) Francesco Passaro	6	6
(United Kingdom) Oliver Crawford	6	3	6
Ilya Ivashka	3	6	1
WC	(Australia) Philip Sekulic	5	1
(Spain) Oriol Roca Batalla	7	6
(France) Calvin Hemery	3	3
24	(Czech Republic) Vít Kopřiva	6	6

Second round
(Italy) Francesco Passaro	4	7^{9}	4
(United Kingdom) Oliver Crawford	6	6^{7}	6
(Spain) Oriol Roca Batalla	3	3
24	(Czech Republic) Vít Kopřiva	6	6

Qualifying competition
(United Kingdom) Oliver Crawford	4	4
24	(Czech Republic) Vít Kopřiva	6	6

=== Seventh qualifier ===
First round
7	(United States) Aleksandar Kovacevic	6	6^{9}	7^{10}
(Belgium) Gauthier Onclin	3	7^{11}	6^{7}
(Kazakhstan) Denis Yevseyev	2	5
(Ukraine) Vitaliy Sachko	6	7
WC	(Australia) Tristan Schoolkate	5	6	6
(Japan) Sho Shimabukuro	7	4	3
(United States) Nicolas Moreno de Alboran	6	0	2
27	(Japan) Shintaro Mochizuki	3	6	6

Second round
7	(United States) Aleksandar Kovacevic	7^{7}	7^{7}
(Ukraine) Vitaliy Sachko	6^{5}	6^{4}
WC	(Australia) Tristan Schoolkate	2	4
27	(Japan) Shintaro Mochizuki	6	6

Qualifying competition
7	(United States) Aleksandar Kovacevic	1	6	6
27	(Japan) Shintaro Mochizuki	6	2	2

=== Eighth qualifier ===
First round
8	(Belgium) David Goffin	6	7
(Italy) Stefano Travaglia	4	5
(United Kingdom) Billy Harris	0	6	6
(Bulgaria) Dimitar Kuzmanov	6	2	2
(France) Pierre-Hugues Herbert	7^{7}	6^{5}	6
(Argentina) Román Andrés Burruchaga	6^{5}	7^{7}	3
(Spain) Pablo Llamas Ruiz	6^{3}	1
29	(Canada) Gabriel Diallo	7^{7}	6

Second round
8	(Belgium) David Goffin	3	6	6
(United Kingdom) Billy Harris	6	3	2
(France) Pierre-Hugues Herbert	6	4	6^{8}
29	(Canada) Gabriel Diallo	4	6	7^{10}

Qualifying competition
8	(Belgium) David Goffin	3	6	6
29	(Canada) Gabriel Diallo	6	3	2

=== Ninth qualifier ===
First round
9	(Bolivia) Hugo Dellien	6	6
(Portugal) Gonçalo Oliveira	4	2
(France) Harold Mayot	7^{7}	6
(Argentina) Andrea Collarini	6^{5}	3
(France) Laurent Lokoli	6	4	2^{r}
(Italy) Federico Gaio	4	6	3
(Czech Republic) Jakub Menšík	6	7^{7}
25	(United States) Brandon Nakashima	4	6^{4}

Second round
9	(Bolivia) Hugo Dellien	0	3
(France) Harold Mayot	6	6
(Italy) Federico Gaio	4	6	3
(Czech Republic) Jakub Menšík	6	3	6

Qualifying competition
(France) Harold Mayot	3	6^{2}
(Czech Republic) Jakub Menšík	6	7^{7}

=== Tenth qualifier ===
First round
10	(Serbia) Hamad Medjedovic	6	6
(Italy) Marco Cecchinato	1	1
(Jordan) Abdullah Shelbayh	6	6
(France) Titouan Droguet	2	4
(Czech Republic) Dalibor Svrčina	3	6	2
WC	(Australia) Omar Jasika	6	1	6
WC	(Belgium) Alexander Blockx	6	3	4
32	(United States) Zachary Svajda	4	6	6

Second round
10	(Serbia) Hamad Medjedovic	7^{7}	6^{5}	2
(Jordan) Abdullah Shelbayh	6^{2}	7^{7}	6
WC	(Australia) Omar Jasika	7	4	6
32	(United States) Zachary Svajda	5	6	2

Qualifying competition
(Jordan) Abdullah Shelbayh	6	1	2
WC	(Australia) Omar Jasika	2	6	6

=== Eleventh qualifier ===
First round
11	(Argentina) Diego Schwartzman	6^{7}	4
(United States) Denis Kudla	7^{9}	6
(Argentina) Marco Trungelliti	3	6	3
(Slovakia) Lukáš Klein	6	3	6
Ivan Gakhov	4	4
(Germany) Rudolf Molleker	6	6
(Italy) Stefano Napolitano	7	7
23	(Moldova) Radu Albot	5	5

Second round
(United States) Denis Kudla	3	7^{7}	4
(Slovakia) Lukáš Klein	6	6^{2}	6
(Germany) Rudolf Molleker	6	4	2
(Italy) Stefano Napolitano	1	6	6

Qualifying competition
(Slovakia) Lukáš Klein	7^{7}	7^{7}
(Italy) Stefano Napolitano	6^{2}	6^{1}

=== Twelfth qualifier ===
First round
12	(France) Benoît Paire	6^{6}	4
(France) Jules Marie	7^{8}	6
(Switzerland) Alexander Ritschard	7^{7}	6
(France) Clément Tabur	6^{5}	3
(Bosnia and Herzegovina) Damir Džumhur	4	6	6
(Kazakhstan) Timofey Skatov	6	3	3
PR	(Uruguay) Pablo Cuevas	0	1
26	(Italy) Giulio Zeppieri	6	6

Second round
(France) Jules Marie	7^{7}	3	2
(Switzerland) Alexander Ritschard	6^{3}	6	6
(Bosnia and Herzegovina) Damir Džumhur	3	2
26	(Italy) Giulio Zeppieri	6	6

Qualifying competition
(Switzerland) Alexander Ritschard	3	3
26	(Italy) Giulio Zeppieri	6	6

=== Thirteenth qualifier ===
First round
13	(Italy) Luca Nardi	7	6
(Italy) Francesco Maestrelli	5	4
(Italy) Matteo Gigante	6^{3}	5
WC	(Australia) Dane Sweeny	7^{7}	7
(Belgium) Joris De Loore	7^{13}	7^{7}
(Australia) Li Tu	6^{11}	6^{4}
(Czech Republic) Zdeněk Kolář	2	2
22	(Belgium) Zizou Bergs	6	6

Second round
13	(Italy) Luca Nardi	6^{2}	2
WC	(Australia) Dane Sweeny	7^{7}	6
(Belgium) Joris De Loore	6^{2}	0
22	(Belgium) Zizou Bergs	7^{7}	6

Qualifying competition
WC	(Australia) Dane Sweeny	5	7	2
22	(Belgium) Zizou Bergs	7	5	0^{r}

=== Fourteenth qualifier ===
First round
14	(Slovakia) Alex Molčan	6	6
(Netherlands) Gijs Brouwer	4	4
(Italy) Alessandro Giannessi	3	4
PR	(Australia) John Millman	6	6
(Italy) Franco Agamenone	3	4
WC	(Australia) Edward Winter	6	6
(France) Geoffrey Blancaneaux	3	5
28	(India) Sumit Nagal	6	7

Second round
14	(Slovakia) Alex Molčan	6	6
PR	(Australia) John Millman	4	3
WC	(Australia) Edward Winter	3	2
28	(India) Sumit Nagal	6	6

Qualifying competition
14	(Slovakia) Alex Molčan	4	4
28	(India) Sumit Nagal	6	6

=== Fifteenth qualifier ===
First round
15	(Argentina) Juan Manuel Cerúndolo	6	4	1
(France) Térence Atmane	4	6	6
(Ukraine) Illya Marchenko	4	6^{5}
(Bosnia and Herzegovina) Nerman Fatić	6	7^{7}
(Slovakia) Jozef Kovalík	1	6	6^{5}
(Italy) Mattia Bellucci	6	4	7^{10}
(United States) Emilio Nava	7^{7}	6
21	(Italy) Luciano Darderi	6^{3}	4

Second round
(France) Térence Atmane	6	3	7
(Bosnia and Herzegovina) Nerman Fatić	3	6	5
(Italy) Mattia Bellucci	4	3
(United States) Emilio Nava	6	6

Qualifying competition
(France) Térence Atmane	7^{7}	7^{7}
(United States) Emilio Nava	6^{5}	6^{3}

=== Sixteenth qualifier ===
First round
16	(Argentina) Thiago Agustín Tirante	7^{7}	6^{6}	2
(Belgium) Kimmer Coppejans	6^{1}	7^{8}	6
(Finland) Otto Virtanen	0	3
(Italy) Andrea Vavassori	6	6
(Chinese Taipei) Wu Tung-lin	6^{0}	4
(Hungary) Máté Valkusz	7^{7}	6
(Japan) Yuta Shimizu	6^{2}	2
17	(Argentina) Francisco Comesaña	7^{7}	6

Second round
(Belgium) Kimmer Coppejans	1	3
(Italy) Andrea Vavassori	6	6
(Hungary) Máté Valkusz	2	6	6
17	(Argentina) Francisco Comesaña	6	4	2

Qualifying competition
(Italy) Andrea Vavassori	1	4
(Hungary) Máté Valkusz	6	6
