= 2024 Australian Open – Boys' doubles =

Boys' doubles
- 2024 Australian Open

Final
- Champions: (United States) Maxwell Exsted (United States) Cooper Woestendick
- Runners-up: (Czech Republic) Petr Brunclík (United Kingdom) Viktor Frydrych
- Score: 6–3, 7–5

Events
Singles	men	women		boys	girls
Doubles	men	women	mixed	boys	girls
WC Singles	men	women	quad	boys	girls
WC Doubles	men	women	quad	boys	girls
- Australian Open

Maxwell Exsted and Cooper Woestendick won the title, defeating Petr Brunclík and Viktor Frydrych in the final, 6–3, 7–5.

Learner Tien and Cooper Williams were the reigning champions, but both players are no longer eligible to participate in junior events.

== Seeds ==
1. (Italy) Federico Cinà / (Japan) Rei Sakamoto (semifinals)
2. (Poland) Tomasz Berkieta / (Czech Republic) Maxim Mrva (second round)
3. (Australia) Hayden Jones / (United States) Alexander Razeghi (second round)
4. (France) Charlie Camus / (Australia) Pavle Marinkov (first round)
5. (Czech Republic) Petr Brunclík / (United Kingdom) Viktor Frydrych (final)
6. (South Korea) Kim Jang-jun / (Kazakhstan) Amir Omarkhanov (second round)
7. (United Kingdom) Oliver Bonding / (Netherlands) Mees Röttgering (first round)
8. (Norway) Nicolai Budkov Kjær / (Czech Republic) Jan Kumstát (quarterfinals)

== Draw ==
Key

- Q = Qualifier
- WC = Wild card
- LL = Lucky loser
- Alt = Alternate
- ITF = ITF entry
- PR = Protected ranking
- SR = Special ranking
- SE = Special exempt
- JE = Junior exempt
- JR = Junior Accelerator Programme entrant
- CO = College Accelerator Programme entrant
- NG = Next Gen Accelerator Program entrant
- w/o = Walkover
- r = Retired
- d = Defaulted

=== Finals ===
Semifinals
1	(Italy) Federico Cinà (Japan) Rei Sakamoto	1	7^{7}	[8]
(United States) Maxwell Exsted (United States) Cooper Woestendick	6	6^{5}	[10]
5	(Czech Republic) Petr Brunclík (United Kingdom) Viktor Frydrych	6^{5}	6	[10]
(United States) Kaylan Bigun (United States) Jagger Leach	7^{7}	3	[5]

Final
(United States) Maxwell Exsted (United States) Cooper Woestendick	6	7
5	(Czech Republic) Petr Brunclík (United Kingdom) Viktor Frydrych	3	5

=== Top half ===
First round
1	(Italy) Federico Cinà (Japan) Rei Sakamoto	6	6
(Germany) Justin Engel (Germany) Tom Sickenberger	3	2
(South Korea) Hwang Dong-hyun; Egor Pleshivtsev	3	6^{5}
(Bulgaria) Ivan Ivanov (Spain) Sergio Planella Hernández	6	7^{7}
(Sweden) William Rejchtman Vinciguerra (Bulgaria) Alexander Vasilev	5	3
(France) Thomas Faurel (France) Théo Papamalamis	7	6
WC	(Australia) Rohan Hazartwala (Australia) Jarrod Joyce	6	3	[8]
8	(Norway) Nicolai Budkov Kjær (Czech Republic) Jan Kumstát	1	6	[10]
3	(Australia) Hayden Jones (United States) Alexander Razeghi	6	7^{7}
WC	(Australia) Cruz Hewitt (Australia) Lachlan McFadzean	0	6^{5}
(Thailand) Thanaphat Boosarawongse (South Korea) Jeong Yeon-su	1	1
(United States) Maxwell Exsted (United States) Cooper Woestendick	6	6
(Brazil) Enzo Kohlmann de Freitas (Brazil) Pedro Rodrigues	6^{6}	1
(United States) Roy Horovitz (Canada) Keegan Rice	7^{8}	6
Timofei Derepasko; Daniil Sarksian	5	7^{7}	[10]
7	(United Kingdom) Oliver Bonding (Netherlands) Mees Röttgering	7	6^{3}	[6]

Second round
1	(Italy) F Cinà (Japan) R Sakamoto	3	6	[10]
(Bulgaria) I Ivanov (Spain) S Planella Hernández	6	3	[8]
(France) T Faurel (France) T Papamalamis	6	3	[5]
8	(Norway) N Budkov Kjær (Czech Republic) J Kumstát	4	6	[10]
3	(Australia) H Jones (United States) A Razeghi	3	2
(United States) M Exsted (United States) C Woestendick	6	6
(United States) R Horovitz (Canada) K Rice	6	7
T Derepasko; D Sarksian	4	5

Quarterfinals
1	(Italy) F Cinà (Japan) R Sakamoto	6	6
8	(Norway) N Budkov Kjær (Czech Republic) J Kumstát	3	2
(United States) M Exsted (United States) C Woestendick	6	6
(United States) R Horovitz (Canada) K Rice	2	3

Semifinals
1	(Italy) F Cinà (Japan) R Sakamoto	1	7^{7}	[8]
(United States) M Exsted (United States) C Woestendick	6	6^{5}	[10]

=== Bottom half ===
First round
5	(Czech Republic) Petr Brunclík (United Kingdom) Viktor Frydrych	6	6
(Brazil) Nicolas Oliveira (China) Zhang Tianhui	4	4
WC	(Australia) Jonas Hahn (Australia) Ty Host	6	6
(Turkey) Atakan Karahan (South Korea) Roh Ho-young	3	2
(Italy) Andrea De Marchi (Romania) Radu David Țurcanu	6	4	[5]
(Italy) Lorenzo Angelini (Italy) Daniele Rapagnetta	3	6	[10]
(Germany) Diego Dedura-Palomero (Germany) Max Schönhaus	6	4	[10]
4	(France) Charlie Camus (Australia) Pavle Marinkov	4	6	[3]
6	(South Korea) Kim Jang-jun (Kazakhstan) Amir Omarkhanov	6	7
(Spain) Izan Almazán Valiente (Netherlands) Thijs Boogaard	3	5
(Singapore) Bill Chan (Peru) Luis José Nakamine	2	6	[8]
(United States) Kaylan Bigun (United States) Jagger Leach	6	3	[10]
(United States) Matthew Forbes (Germany) Max Stenzer	6^{5}	6	[10]
(United Kingdom) Benjamin Gusic Wan (United Kingdom) Charlie Robertson	7^{7}	1	[6]
WC	(Australia) Thomas Nicholas Gadecki (Australia) Hugh Winter	3	6^{3}
2	(Poland) Tomasz Berkieta (Czech Republic) Maxim Mrva	6	7^{7}

Second round
5	(Czech Republic) P Brunclík (United Kingdom) V Frydrych	6^{3}	6	[10]
WC	(Australia) J Hahn (Australia) T Host	7^{7}	1	[8]
(Italy) L Angelini (Italy) D Rapagnetta	3	2
(Germany) D Dedura-Palomero (Germany) M Schönhaus	6	6
6	(South Korea) J-j Kim (Kazakhstan) A Omarkhanov	4	6	[3]
(United States) K Bigun (United States) J Leach	6	1	[10]
(United States) M Forbes (Germany) M Stenzer	6	7
2	(Poland) T Berkieta (Czech Republic) M Mrva	0	5

Quarterfinals
5	(Czech Republic) P Brunclík (United Kingdom) V Frydrych	6	6
(Germany) D Dedura-Palomero (Germany) M Schönhaus	2	2
(United States) K Bigun (United States) J Leach	6	6^{2}	[10]
(United States) M Forbes (Germany) M Stenzer	3	7^{7}	[4]

Semifinals
5	(Czech Republic) P Brunclík (United Kingdom) V Frydrych	6^{5}	6	[10]
(United States) K Bigun (United States) J Leach	7^{7}	3	[5]
