= Renáta Jamrichová =

Slovak tennis player (born 2007)

- Country (sports): Slovakia
- Born: 20 June 2007 (age 19) Trnava, Slovakia
- Height: 1.80 m (5 ft 11 in)
- Plays: Left (two-handed backhand)
- Coach: Matej Lipták
- Prize money: $147,608

Singles
- Career record: 68–44
- Career titles: 2 ITF
- Highest ranking: No. 217 (6 October 2025)
- Current ranking: No. 393 (29 June 2026)

Grand Slam singles results
- Australian Open: Q2 (2025)
- Wimbledon: Q2 (2025)

Doubles
- Career record: 7–10
- Career titles: 1 ITF
- Highest ranking: No. 477 (18 August 2025)
- Current ranking: No. 543 (29 June 2026)

Grand Slam doubles results
- Australian Open Junior: W (2023)
- French Open Junior: W (2024)
- Wimbledon Junior: SF (2023)
- US Open Junior: SF (2023)

Team competitions
- Fed Cup: F (2024); Record 2–2
Medal record
Women's tennis
Representing Slovakia
European Youth Summer Olympic Festival
Gold medal – first place	2022 Banská Bystrica	Girls' singles
Gold medal – first place	2022 Banská Bystrica	Mixed doubles
- Last updated on: 8 July 2026.

Renáta Jamrichová (born 20 June 2007) is a Slovak professional tennis player. She has a career-high singles ranking by the WTA of No. 217, achieved on 6 October 2025, and a highest doubles ranking of No. 477, reached in August 2025.

She had a career-high combined junior ranking of No. 1, achieved on 29 January 2024.

Jamrichová and her partner Federica Urgesi won the 2023 Australian girls' doubles title, beating Hayu Kinoshita and Sara Saito in the final. The following year, she won the 2024 Australian girls' singles title, defeating Emerson Jones in the final. The final of the 2024 Wimbledon girls' singles was a rematch between Jamrichová and Jones, in which she won her second junior major singles title. She also won the 2024 French Open girls' doubles title, partnering Tereza Valentová.

== Early life and background ==
Born in Trnava, Jamrichová is the daughter of Slovak athlete Milan Jamrich. She has two younger sisters. At the age of 13, she began training at the Slovak National Tennis Centre in Bratislava.

== Career ==
=== Juniors ===
In 2022, she won two gold medals at the European Youth Summer Olympic Festival (EYOF), winning in singles and mixed doubles.

As the top seed in girls' singles at the 2024 Australian Open, she won the title, defeating Jones in the final. She also defeated Jones to win the girls' singles at that year's Wimbledon.

=== Professional ===
At the age of 15, Jamrichová represented Slovakia at the 2023 Billie Jean King Cup play-offs. She was the youngest player to represent Slovakia in the Billie Jean King Cup, and recorded a win over Nadia Podoroska, in straight sets.

In April 2024, she won her first professional title at the W15 event in Sharm El Sheikh. She was the youngest Slovak player to win an ITF title since Viktória Hrunčáková in 2014. The following month, she reached the quarterfinal of the W75 event in Trnava as a wildcard.

In November 2024, Jamrichová lost to Taylor Townsend in the opening singles match as Slovakia overcame the US team to qualify for the BJK Cup quarterfinals.

In September 2025, during the first point of her quarterfinal match at the WTA 125 tournament in Caldas da Rainha, Jamrichová sustained a severe knee injury that required surgery and an extended period of rehabilitation. She returned to competition at the W75 tournament in Trnava in November 2026.

== ITF Circuit finals ==
=== Singles: 3 (2 titles, 1 runner-up) ===
Legend W75 tournaments (0–1) W15 tournaments (2–0)	Finals by surface Hard (1–1) Clay (1–0)

Result	W–L	Date	Tournament	Tier	Surface	Opponent	Score
Win	1–0	Mar 2024	ITF Sharm El Sheikh, Egypt	W15	Hard	(Romania) Elena-Teodora Cadar	2–6, 6–3, 6–3
Win	2–0	Apr 2024	ITF Telde, Spain	W15	Clay	(Spain) María García Cid	6–3, 6–7^{(4)}, 6–2
Loss	2–1	Oct 2024	Slovak Open, Slovakia	W75	Hard (i)	(Slovakia) Mia Pohánková	6–2, 4–6, 2–6

=== Doubles: 1 (title) ===
Legend W75 tournaments	Finals by surface Clay (1–0)

Result	W–L	Date	Tournament	Tier	Surface	Partner	Opponents	Score
Win	1–0	Jul 2025	Ladies Open Hechingen, Germany	W75	Clay	Elena Pridankina	(China) Feng Shuo (China) Li Zongyu	6–2, 6–2

== Junior Grand Slam tournament finals ==
=== Singles: 2 (2 titles) ===
Result	Year	Tournament	Surface	Opponent	Score
Win	2024	Australian Open	Hard	(Australia) Emerson Jones	6–4, 6–1
Win	2024	Wimbledon	Grass	(Australia) Emerson Jones	6–3, 6–4

=== Doubles: 2 (2 titles) ===
Result	Year	Tournament	Surface	Partner	Opponents	Score
Win	2023	Australian Open	Hard	(Italy) Federica Urgesi	(Japan) Hayu Kinoshita (Japan) Sara Saito	7–6^{(7–5)}, 1–6, [10–7]
Win	2024	French Open	Clay	(Czech Republic) Tereza Valentová	(United States) Tyra Caterina Grant (United States) Iva Jovic	6–4, 6–4
