= 2024 Australian Open – Girls' doubles =

Girls' doubles
- 2024 Australian Open

Final
- Champions: (United States) Tyra Caterina Grant (United States) Iva Jovic
- Runners-up: (Czech Republic) Julie Paštiková (Germany) Julia Stusek
- Score: 6–3, 6–1

Events
Singles	men	women		boys	girls
Doubles	men	women	mixed	boys	girls
WC Singles	men	women	quad
WC Doubles	men	women	quad
- Australian Open

Tyra Caterina Grant and Iva Jovic won the title, defeating Julie Paštiková and Julia Stusek in the final, 6–3, 6–1.

Renáta Jamrichová and Federica Urgesi were the reigning champions, but Urgesi was no longer eligible to participate in junior events. Jamrichová partnered Isabelle Lacy, but lost in the second round to Maya Joint and Kristiana Sidorova.

== Seeds ==
1. (Japan) Ena Koike / (Japan) Sara Saito (semifinals)
2. (United Kingdom) Hannah Klugman / (United Kingdom) Mingge Xu (semifinals)
3. (United States) Tyra Caterina Grant / (United States) Iva Jovic (champions)
4. (Spain) Charo Esquiva Bañuls / (South Korea) Jang Ga-eul (first round)
5. (Japan) Hayu Kinoshita / (Japan) Wakana Sonobe (second round)
6. (Australia) Maya Joint / Kristiana Sidorova (quarterfinals)
7. (Australia) Emerson Jones / (United Kingdom) Mika Stojsavljevic (second round)
8. (Bulgaria) Iva Ivanova / (Benin) Gloriana Nahum (withdrew)

== Draw ==
Key

- Q = Qualifier
- WC = Wild card
- LL = Lucky loser
- Alt = Alternate
- ITF = ITF entry
- PR = Protected ranking
- SR = Special ranking
- SE = Special exempt
- JE = Junior exempt
- JR = Junior Accelerator Programme entrant
- CO = College Accelerator Programme entrant
- NG = Next Gen Accelerator Program entrant
- w/o = Walkover
- r = Retired
- d = Defaulted

=== Finals ===
Semifinals
1	(Japan) Ena Koike (Japan) Sara Saito	3	6^{4}
3	(United States) Tyra Caterina Grant (United States) Iva Jovic	6	7^{7}
(Czech Republic) Julie Paštiková (Germany) Julia Stusek	6	1	[10]
2	(United Kingdom) Hannah Klugman (United Kingdom) Mingge Xu	3	6	8

Final
3	(United States) Tyra Caterina Grant (United States) Iva Jovic	6	6
(Czech Republic) Julie Paštiková (Germany) Julia Stusek	3	1

=== Top half ===
First round
1	(Japan) Ena Koike (Japan) Sara Saito	6	6
Daria Egorova; Vlada Mincheva	4	1
(Netherlands) Joy de Zeeuw (Morocco) Malak El Allami	6^{4}	3
(United States) Alanis Hamilton (Norway) Emily Sartz-Lunde	7^{7}	6
(Netherlands) Rose Marie Nijkamp (Czech Republic) Vendula Valdmannová	6	6
(Romania) Elena Ruxandra Bertea (Israel) Mika Buchnik	0	2
WC	(Australia) Kimiko Cooper (Australia) Gabby Gregg	2	1
Alt	(Japan) Shiho Tsujioka (Japan) Hikari Yamamoto	6	6
3	(United States) Tyra Caterina Grant (United States) Iva Jovic	6	6
(Italy) Noemi Basiletti (Italy) Gaia Maduzzi	1	0
(Ukraine) Yelyzaveta Kotliar (Poland) Monika Stankiewicz	1	6	[10]
(Bulgaria) Rositsa Dencheva (Bulgaria) Elizara Yaneva	6	0	[5]
(Bulgaria) Yoana Konstantinova (Serbia) Teodora Kostović	7^{7}	6
WC	(Australia) Lily Taylor (Australia) Gabrielle Villegas	6^{4}	2
(Japan) Reina Goto (China) Zhang Junhan	6	5	[1]
7	(Australia) Emerson Jones (United Kingdom) Mika Stojsavljevic	2	7	[10]

Second round
1	(Japan) E Koike (Japan) S Saito	6	6
(United States) A Hamilton (Norway) E Sartz-Lunde	2	3
(Netherlands) RM Nijkamp (Czech Republic) V Valdmannová	7^{7}	6
Alt	(Japan) S Tsujioka (Japan) H Yamamoto	6^{5}	4
3	(United States) TC Grant (United States) I Jovic	6	6
(Ukraine) Y Kotliar (Poland) M Stankiewicz	3	4
(Bulgaria) Y Konstantinova (Serbia) T Kostović	2	6	[10]
7	(Australia) E Jones (United Kingdom) M Stojsavljevic	6	1	[5]

Quarterfinals
1	(Japan) E Koike (Japan) S Saito	7	6
(Netherlands) RM Nijkamp (Czech Republic) V Valdmannová	5	1
3	(United States) TC Grant (United States) I Jovic	6	6
(Bulgaria) Y Konstantinova (Serbia) T Kostović	2	4

Semifinals
1	(Japan) E Koike (Japan) S Saito	3	6^{4}
3	(United States) TC Grant (United States) I Jovic	6	7^{7}

=== Bottom half ===
First round
6	(Australia) Maya Joint; Kristiana Sidorova	4	6	[10]
(France) Ksenia Efremova (Czech Republic) Alena Kovačková	6	4	[3]
(Austria) Ekaterina Perelygina (United States) Mia Slama	5	6^{1}
(Slovakia) Renáta Jamrichová (United Kingdom) Isabelle Lacy	7	7^{7}
(Denmark) Laura Brunkel (Brazil) Olivia Carneiro	6	3	[10]
WC	(Australia) Tahlia Kokkinis (Australia) Koharu Nishikawa	4	6	[6]
(Czech Republic) Julie Paštiková (Germany) Julia Stusek	6	3	[10]
4	(Spain) Charo Esquiva Bañuls (South Korea) Jang Ga-eul	4	6	[2]
5	(Japan) Hayu Kinoshita (Japan) Wakana Sonobe	7	7
(Argentina) Luna María Cinalli (Chile) Antonia Vergara Rivera	5	5
(Kazakhstan) Asylzhan Arystanbekova; Yuliya Perapekhina	6	6
(Australia) Renee Alame (Australia) Alana Subasic	1	3
(Italy) Francesca Gandolfi (Italy) Vittoria Paganetti	2	6	[7]
(Sweden) Lea Nilsson (United Kingdom) Hephzibah Oluwadare	6	1	[10]
(United States) Kate Fakih (United States) Aspen Schuman	3	3
2	(United Kingdom) Hannah Klugman (United Kingdom) Mingge Xu	6	6

Second round
6	(Australia) M Joint; K Sidorova	6	6
(Slovakia) R Jamrichová (United Kingdom) I Lacy	2	4
(Denmark) L Brunkel (Brazil) O Carneiro	3	2
(Czech Republic) J Paštiková (Germany) J Stusek	6	6
5	(Japan) H Kinoshita (Japan) W Sonobe	4	6	[7]
(Kazakhstan) A Arystanbekova; Y Perapekhina	6	2	[10]
(Sweden) L Nilsson (United Kingdom) H Oluwadare	3	2
2	(United Kingdom) H Klugman (United Kingdom) M Xu	6	6

Quarterfinals
6	(Australia) M Joint; K Sidorova	6	1	[5]
(Czech Republic) J Paštiková (Germany) J Stusek	0	6	[10]
(Kazakhstan) A Arystanbekova; Y Perapekhina	2	2
2	(United Kingdom) H Klugman (United Kingdom) M Xu	6	6

Semifinals
(Czech Republic) J Paštiková (Germany) J Stusek	6	1	[10]
2	(United Kingdom) H Klugman (United Kingdom) M Xu	3	6	[8]
