= 2024 Australian Open – Boys' singles =

Boys' singles
- 2024 Australian Open

Final
- Champion: (Japan) Rei Sakamoto
- Runner-up: (Czech Republic) Jan Kumstát
- Score: 3–6, 7–6^{(7–2)}, 7–5

Events
Singles	men	women		boys	girls
Doubles	men	women	mixed	boys	girls
WC Singles	men	women	quad	boys	girls
WC Doubles	men	women	quad	boys	girls
- Australian Open

Rei Sakamoto defeated Jan Kumstát in the final, 3–6, 7–6^{(7–2)}, 7–5 to win the boys' singles tennis title at the 2024 Australian Open. He became the second player from Japan to win a boys' junior major title, after Shintaro Mochizuki at the 2019 Wimbledon Championships.

Alexander Blockx was the reigning champion, but was no longer eligible to participate in junior events. He received a wild card into the men's singles qualifying, where he lost to Zachary Svajda in the first round.

Cruz Hewitt, the son of two-time major champion and former ATP world no. 1 Lleyton Hewitt, and Jagger Leach, the son of three-time major champion and former WTA world no. 1 Lindsay Davenport, made their junior major debuts in this tournament.

== Seeds ==
1. (Italy) Federico Cinà (first round)
2. (Norway) Nicolai Budkov Kjær (semifinals)
3. (Poland) Tomasz Berkieta (third round)
4. (Japan) Rei Sakamoto (champion)
5. (United States) Kaylan Bigun (quarterfinals)
6. (United States) Alexander Razeghi (third round)
7. (Czech Republic) Maxim Mrva (second round)
8. (United Kingdom) Oliver Bonding (first round)
9. (France) Charlie Camus (second round)
10. (United States) Roy Horovitz (third round)
11. (Czech Republic) Petr Brunclík (third round)
12. (China) Zhang Tianhui (first round)
13. (Australia) Pavle Marinkov (third round)
14. (South Korea) Kim Jang-jun (third round)
15. (Brazil) Pedro Rodrigues (first round)
16. (Australia) Hayden Jones (quarterfinals)

Click on the seed number of a player to go to their draw section.

== Draw ==
Key

- Q = Qualifier
- WC = Wild card
- LL = Lucky loser
- Alt = Alternate
- ITF = ITF entry
- PR = Protected ranking
- SR = Special ranking
- SE = Special exempt
- JE = Junior exempt
- JR = Junior Accelerator Programme entrant
- CO = College Accelerator Programme entrant
- NG = Next Gen Accelerator Program entrant
- w/o = Walkover
- r = Retired
- d = Defaulted

=== Finals ===
Quarterfinals
(Kazakhstan) Amir Omarkhanov	2	0
(Netherlands) Mees Röttgering	6	6
16	(Australia) Hayden Jones	7^{7}	3	5
(Czech Republic) Jan Kumstát	6^{2}	6	7
(United States) Cooper Woestendick	5	3
4	(Japan) Rei Sakamoto	7	6
5	(United States) Kaylan Bigun	6	6^{2}	3
2	(Norway) Nicolai Budkov Kjær	3	7^{7}	6

Semifinals
(Netherlands) Mees Röttgering	1	3
(Czech Republic) Jan Kumstát	6	6
4	(Japan) Rei Sakamoto	6	6
2	(Norway) Nicolai Budkov Kjær	2	4

Final
(Czech Republic) Jan Kumstát	6	6^{2}	5
4	(Japan) Rei Sakamoto	3	7^{7}	7

=== Top half ===
==== Section 1 ====
First round
1	(Italy) Federico Cinà	6	3	3
(Kazakhstan) Amir Omarkhanov	0	6	6
(United Kingdom) Viktor Frydrych	6	6
(Peru) Luis José Nakamine	2	2
WC	(Australia) Ty Host	6	6
WC	(Bolivia) Diego Eduardo Muñoz Navia	3	3
WC	(Japan) Ryo Tabata	7	2	6^{10}
14	(South Korea) Kim Jang-jun	5	6	7^{12}
10	(United States) Roy Horovitz	7^{7}	6
Egor Pleshivtsev	6^{5}	4
(France) Théo Papamalamis	4	7^{7}	6
Q	(Germany) Justin Engel	6	6^{1}	0
(Netherlands) Mees Röttgering	6	7^{7}
WC	(Australia) Hugh Winter	2	6^{4}
(Brazil) Nicolas Oliveira	4	4
7	(Czech Republic) Maxim Mrva	6	6

Second round
(Kazakhstan) A Omarkhanov	3	7^{8}	6
(United Kingdom) V Frydrych	6	6^{6}	3
WC	(Australia) T Host	6^{3}	4
14	(South Korea) J-j Kim	7^{7}	6
10	(United States) R Horovitz	1	7^{10}	6
(France) T Papamalamis	6	6^{8}	2
(Netherlands) M Röttgering	6	6
7	(Czech Republic) M Mrva	1	3

Third round
(Kazakhstan) A Omarkhanov	6	5	6
14	(South Korea) J-j Kim	3	7	0
10	(United States) R Horovitz	4	4
(Netherlands) M Röttgering	6	6

Quarterfinals
(Kazakhstan) A Omarkhanov	2	0
(Netherlands) M Röttgering	6	6

==== Section 2 ====
First round
3	(Poland) Tomasz Berkieta	6	3	6
(France) Thomas Faurel	4	6	3
(Bulgaria) Ivan Ivanov	3	3
(Brazil) Enzo Kolhmann de Freitas	6	6
(United States) Jagger Leach	7^{7}	6
Daniil Sarksian	6^{4}	4
SE	(Italy) Daniele Rapagnetta	5	4
16	(Australia) Hayden Jones	7	6
12	(China) Zhang Tianhui	4	3
(Czech Republic) Jan Kumstát	6	6
(Spain) Izan Almazán Valiente	6	5	1
(United Kingdom) Charlie Robertson	3	7	6
Q	(South Korea) Jeong Yeon-su	7^{7}	6
Q	(Germany) Tom Sickenberger	6^{4}	0
WC	(Australia) Cruz Hewitt	2	3
6	(United States) Alexander Razeghi	6	6

Second round
3	(Poland) T Berkieta	7^{7}	3	6
(Brazil) E Kolhmann de Freitas	6^{1}	6	2
(United States) J Leach	4	0
16	(Australia) H Jones	6	6
(Czech Republic) J Kumstát	6^{4}	7^{7}	6
(United Kingdom) C Robertson	7^{7}	6^{1}	3
Q	(South Korea) Y-s Jeong	3	1
6	(United States) A Razeghi	6	6

Third round
3	(Poland) T Berkieta	4	7	5
16	(Australia) H Jones	6	5	7
(Czech Republic) J Kumstát	7^{7}	6
6	(United States) A Razeghi	6^{4}	2

Quarterfinals
16	(Australia) H Jones	7^{7}	3	5
(Czech Republic) J Kumstát	6^{2}	6	7

=== Bottom half ===
==== Section 3 ====
First round
8	(United Kingdom) Oliver Bonding	4	2
(Germany) Max Schönhaus	6	6
(United States) Cooper Woestendick	4	7^{7}	6
Q	(Thailand) Thanaphat Boosarawongse	6	6^{4}	2
WC	(Australia) Daniel Jovanovski	5	3
(Turkey) Atakan Karahan	7	6
Q	(Romania) Radu David Țurcanu	3	4
9	(France) Charlie Camus	6	6
13	(Australia) Pavle Marinkov	6	6
(South Korea) Roh Ho-young	3	2
(Germany) Diego Dedura-Palomero	6	3	6
(United States) Maxwell Exsted	2	6	4
SE	(Italy) Lorenzo Angelini	6	3	6
Timofei Derepasko	3	6	4
(Bulgaria) Alexander Vasilev	6^{3}	3
4	(Japan) Rei Sakamoto	7^{7}	6

Second round
(Germany) M Schönhaus	4	7^{7}	5
(United States) C Woestendick	6	6^{2}	7
(Turkey) A Karahan	6	6
9	(France) C Camus	1	2
13	(Australia) P Marinkov	6	6
(Germany) D Dedura-Palomero	2	4
SE	(Italy) L Angelini	4	2
4	(Japan) R Sakamoto	6	6

Third round
(United States) C Woestendick	7^{7}	1	7
(Turkey) A Karahan	6^{2}	6	5
13	(Australia) P Marinkov	6	0	1
4	(Japan) R Sakamoto	4	6	6

Quarterfinals
(United States) C Woestendick	5	3
4	(Japan) R Sakamoto	7	6

==== Section 4 ====
First round
5	(United States) Kaylan Bigun	6	3	6
WC	(Australia) Rohan Hazratwala	3	6	4
(Spain) Sergio Planella Hernández	3	5
(Netherlands) Thijs Boogaard	6	7
(United Kingdom) Benjamin Gusic Wan	6	3	7
(South Korea) Hwang Dong-hyun	2	6	5
(Germany) Max Stenzer	6^{1}	3
11	(Czech Republic) Petr Brunclík	7^{7}	6
15	(Brazil) Pedro Rodrigues	4	4
(Canada) Keegan Rice	6	6
Q	(Italy) Andrea De Marchi	4	4
Q	(Bulgaria) Anas Mazdrashki	6	6
Q	(Sweden) William Rejchtman Vinciguerra	6^{8}	6	6
WC	(Australia) Jerome Estephan	7^{10}	3	1
(United States) Matthew Forbes	7^{7}	4	1
2	(Norway) Nicolai Budkov Kjær	6^{4}	6	6

Second round
5	(United States) K Bigun	6	3	6
(Netherlands) T Boogaard	2	6	3
(United Kingdom) B Gusic Wan	4	2
11	(Czech Republic) P Brunclík	6	6
(Canada) K Rice	3	2
Q	(Bulgaria) A Mazdrashki	6	6
Q	(Sweden) W Rejchtman Vinciguerra	5	1
2	(Norway) N Budkov Kjær	7	6

Third round
5	(United States) K Bigun	6^{5}	6	7^{10}
11	(Czech Republic) P Brunclík	7^{7}	3	6^{8}
Q	(Bulgaria) A Mazdrashki	1	6	3
2	(Norway) N Budkov Kjær	6	3	6

Quarterfinals
5	(United States) K Bigun	6	6^{2}	3
2	(Norway) N Budkov Kjær	3	7^{7}	6

== Qualifying ==
=== Seeds ===
1. (Kazakhstan) Danial Rakhmatullayev (first round)
2. (Singapore) Bill Chan (qualifying competition)
3. (Morocco) Karim Bennani (qualifying competition)
4. (South Korea) Jeong Yeon-su (qualified)
5. (Switzerland) Nikola Djosic (qualifying competition)
6. (Sweden) William Rejchtman Vinciguerra (qualified)
7. (Germany) Justin Engel (qualified)
8. (Bulgaria) Anas Mazdrashki (qualified)
9. (Japan) Yuta Tomida (first round)
10. (Germany) Tom Sickenberger (qualified)
11. (Israel) Gur Trakhtenberg (first round)
12. (Kazakhstan) Vitaliy Zatsepin (first round)
13. (India) Aditya Govila (first round)
14. (Thailand) Thanaphat Boosarawongse (qualified)
15. (Italy) Andrea De Marchi (qualified)
16. (India) Kriish Tyagi (first round)

=== Qualifiers ===
1. (Thailand) Thanaphat Boosarawongse
2. (Romania) Radu David Țurcanu
3. (Italy) Andrea De Marchi
4. (South Korea) Jeong Yeon-su
5. (Germany) Tom Sickenberger
6. (Sweden) William Rejchtman Vinciguerra
7. (Germany) Justin Engel
8. (Bulgaria) Anas Mazdrashki

=== Draw ===
==== First qualifier ====
First round
1	(Kazakhstan) Danial Rakhmatullayev	4	5
(Romania) Ștefan Horia Haita	6	7
(New Zealand) Harry Pugh	3	4
14	(Thailand) Thanaphat Boosarawongse	6	6

Qualifying competition
(Romania) Ștefan Horia Haita	2	4
14	(Thailand) Thanaphat Boosarawongse	6	6

==== Second qualifier ====
First round
2	(Singapore) Bill Chan	3	6	6
WC	(Australia) Lachlan McFadzean	6	2	1
(Romania) Radu David Țurcanu	6	6
9	(Japan) Yuta Tomida	4	3

Qualifying competition
2	(Singapore) Bill Chan	2	6^{9}
(Romania) Radu David Țurcanu	6	7^{11}

==== Third qualifier ====
First round
3	(Morocco) Karim Bennani	7	6
(Chinese Taipei) Hung Ke-hau	5	2
WC	(Australia) Jarrod Joyce	7	2	2
15	(Italy) Andrea De Marchi	5	6	6

Qualifying competition
3	(Morocco) Karim Bennani	4	2
15	(Italy) Andrea De Marchi	6	6

==== Fourth qualifier ====
First round
4	(South Korea) Jeong Yeon-su	6	4	7^{8}
(Germany) Mika Petkovic	4	6	6^{6}
WC	(Australia) Jonas Hahn	7^{7}	6
16	(India) Kriish Tyagi	6^{5}	3

Qualifying competition
4	(South Korea) Jeong Yeon-su	6	6
WC	(Australia) Jonas Hahn	3	2

==== Fifth qualifier ====
First round
5	(Switzerland) Nikola Djosic	6	6
(Chinese Taipei) Chen Kuan-shou	3	2
Alt	(Switzerland) Luc Wieland	2	4
10	(Germany) Tom Sickenberger	6	6

Qualifying competition
5	(Switzerland) Nikola Djosic	6	4	6^{10}
10	(Germany) Tom Sickenberger	2	6	7^{12}

==== Sixth qualifier ====
First round
6	(Sweden) William Rejchtman Vinciguerra	6	6
WC	(Australia) Oscar Andrews	0	3
(Italy) Tobia Costanzo Baragiola Mordini	6	7^{7}
11	(Israel) Gur Trakhtenberg	4	6^{1}

Qualifying competition
6	(Sweden) William Rejchtman Vinciguerra	6	5
(Italy) Tobia Costanzo Baragiola Mordini	4	4^{r}

==== Seventh qualifier ====
First round
7	(Germany) Justin Engel	5	7	6
(Japan) Kazuma Kimura	7	5	1
WC	(Australia) Zane Stevens	6	6
12	(Kazakhstan) Vitaliy Zatsepin	3	3

Qualifying competition
7	(Germany) Justin Engel	7^{7}	5	6
WC	(Australia) Zane Stevens	6^{5}	7	4

==== Eighth qualifier ====
First round
8	(Bulgaria) Anas Mazdrashki	7^{7}	6
(Nicaragua) Joaquín Guilleme	6^{3}	2
WC	(Australia) Thomas Nicholas Gadecki	6	6
13	(India) Aditya Govila	2	3

Qualifying competition
8	(Bulgaria) Anas Mazdrashki	6	6
WC	(Australia) Thomas Nicholas Gadecki	3	4
