= 2024 Australian Open – Wheelchair quad singles =

Wheelchair quad singles
- 2024 Australian Open

Final
- Champion: (Netherlands) Sam Schröder
- Runner-up: (Israel) Guy Sasson
- Score: 6–3, 6–3

Events
Singles	men	women		boys	girls
Doubles	men	women	mixed	boys	girls
WC Singles	men	women	quad	boys	girls
WC Doubles	men	women	quad	boys	girls
- Australian Open

Two-time defending champion Sam Schröder defeated Guy Sasson in the final, 6–3, 6–3 to win the quad singles wheelchair tennis title at the 2024 Australian Open. It was his third Australian Open singles title and sixth major singles title overall.

== Seeds ==
1. (Netherlands) Niels Vink (semifinals)
2. (Netherlands) Sam Schröder (champion)
3. (United States) David Wagner (first round)
4. (Israel) Guy Sasson (final)

== Draw ==
Key

- Q = Qualifier
- WC = Wild card
- LL = Lucky loser
- Alt = Alternate
- ITF = ITF entry
- PR = Protected ranking
- SR = Special ranking
- SE = Special exempt
- JE = Junior exempt
- JR = Junior Accelerator Programme entrant
- CO = College Accelerator Programme entrant
- NG = Next Gen Accelerator Program entrant
- w/o = Walkover
- r = Retired
- d = Defaulted

=== Draw ===
First round
1	(Netherlands) Niels Vink	6	6
(Turkey) Ahmet Kaplan	0	1
WC	(United Kingdom) Gregory Slade	3	6^{3}
(Chile) Francisco Cayulef	6	7^{7}
4	(Israel) Guy Sasson	6	6
(Turkey) Ali Ataman	0	1
WC	(Australia) Finn Broadbent	1	0
(Canada) Robert Shaw	6	6
(Slovakia) Tomáš Masaryk	2	1
(Australia) Heath Davidson	6	6
(South Africa) Donald Ramphadi	6	6
3	(United States) David Wagner	3	4
(Chile) Diego Pérez	4	6^{1}
(United Kingdom) Andy Lapthorne	6	7^{7}
(Brazil) Ymanitu Silva	1	0
2	(Netherlands) Sam Schröder	6	6

Quarterfinals
1	(Netherlands) N Vink	6	6
(Chile) F Cayulef	2	1
4	(Israel) G Sasson	6	6
(Canada) R Shaw	4	2
(Australia) H Davidson	6	2	1
(South Africa) D Ramphadi	1	6	6
(United Kingdom) A Lapthorne	1	0
2	(Netherlands) S Schröder	6	6

Semifinals
1	(Netherlands) N Vink	6	3	1
4	(Israel) G Sasson	4	6	6
(South Africa) D Ramphadi	1	1
2	(Netherlands) S Schröder	6	6

Final
4	(Israel) G Sasson	3	3
2	(Netherlands) S Schröder	6	6
