= Mees Röttgering =

Dutch tennis player (born 2007)

- Country (sports): Netherlands
- Born: 7 July 2007 (age 19) Wanssum, Netherlands
- Height: 1.85 m (6 ft 1 in)
- Plays: Left-handed (two-handed backhand)
- College: Wake Forest
- Prize money: US $132,121

Singles
- Career record: 2–4 (at ATP Tour level, Grand Slam level, and in Davis Cup)
- Career titles: 0
- Highest ranking: No. 294 (9 November 2026)
- Current ranking: No. 294 (9 November 2026)

Doubles
- Career record: 0–0 (at ATP Tour level, Grand Slam level, and in Davis Cup)
- Career titles: 0
- Highest ranking: No. 959 (30 September 2024)
- Current ranking: No. 1,447 (9 November 2026)
- Last updated on: 9 November 2026.

Mees Röttgering (born 7 July 2007) is a Dutch professional tennis player. He has a career-high ATP singles ranking of No. 294 achieved on 9 November 2026 and a doubles ranking of No. 959 reached on 30 September 2024.

== Early life ==
Röttgering was born in Wanssum in the Venray region of the Dutch province of Limburg. He began training in tennis at the age of six. He later attended a LOOT school specially set up for young athletes in collaboration with Sint-Joriscollege in Eindhoven.

Since 2014, Röttgering coach was Jochem Mol in Veldhoven. Ten years later he also started working with former professional Sjeng Schalken.

== Juniors ==
Röttgering had remarkable results on the ITF junior circuit. The young Dutch reached the semifinals in the boys' singles category at the 2024 Australian Open. Later that season, he was a runner-up in singles at 2024 Wimbledon Championships, with a win over top seed and junior French Open champion Kaylan Bigun in the quarterfinal. He lost to second seed Nicolai Budkov Kjær in the final.

His brilliant season culminated on the 2024 ITF Junior Finals title in October. In the final, he defeated Rafael Jódar in straight sets.

Röttgering reached an ITF junior combined ranking of world No. 1 on 6 January 2025.

== Professional career ==
=== 2023-2024: First professional matches, maiden Futures final ===
In 2023, Röttgering reached the semifinals of the senior Dutch Championships as a 16-year-old, where he was defeated by Gijs Brouwer.

In February 2024, he reached his first professional final at M15 Sharm El Sheikh, a Futures-level event. He lost to Philip Henning in the final. Despite that, he became the only 16 year-old inside the top 1000 male rankings that time. He also became the youngest Dutch man ever to reach a singles final on the ITF Tour.

=== 2025: Turning pro, ATP debut ===
Röttgering received a wildcard for his ATP debut at his home tournament, the 2025 ABN AMRO Open in Rotterdam, where he made his ATP debut.

== ITF World Tennis Tour finals ==
=== Singles: 4 (2–2) ===
| Legend ITF WTT (2–2) |

| Result | W–L | Date | Tournament | Tier | Surface | Opponent | Score |
|---|---|---|---|---|---|---|---|
| Loss | 0–1 | Feb 2024 | M15 Sharm El Sheikh, Egypt | WTT | Hard | (South Africa) Philip Henning | 3–6, 3–6 |
| Win | 1–1 | Mar 2026 | M15 Montréal, Canada | WTT | Hard | (United States) Andrew Fenty | 6–7^{(3–7)}, 6–1, 6–4 |
| Win | 2–1 | Apr 2026 | M25 Xalapa, Mexico | WTT | Hard | (Mexico) Rodrigo Pacheco Mendez | 6–4, 6–3 |
| Loss | 2–2 | Jul 2026 | M25 Louisville, USA | WTT | Hard | (United States) Ozan Baris | 3–6, 2–6 |

=== Doubles: 1 (title) ===
| Legend ITF WTT (1–0) |

| Result | W–L | Date | Tournament | Tier | Surface | Partner | Opponents | Score |
|---|---|---|---|---|---|---|---|---|
| Win | 1–0 | Jul 2024 | M15 Metzingen, Germany | WTT | Clay | (Netherlands) Fons van Sambeek | (France) Arthur Nagel (France) Antoine Walch | 6–4, 6–2 |

== Junior Grand Slam finals ==
=== Singles: 1 (runner-up) ===
| Result | Year | Tournament | Surface | Opponent | Score |
|---|---|---|---|---|---|
| Loss | 2024 | Wimbledon | Grass | (Norway) Nicolai Budkov Kjær | 3–6, 3–6 |
