= 2024 Australian Open – Wheelchair women's doubles =

Wheelchair women's doubles
- 2024 Australian Open

Final
- Champions: (Netherlands) Diede de Groot (Netherlands) Jiske Griffioen
- Runners-up: (Japan) Yui Kamiji (South Africa) Kgothatso Montjane
- Score: 6–3, 7–6^{(7–2)}

Details
- Draw: 8
- Seeds: 2

Events
| Singles | men | women | | boys | girls |
| Doubles | men | women | mixed | boys | girls |
| WC Singles | men | women | quad |
| WC Doubles | men | women | quad |
| ← 2023 · | Australian Open | · 2025 → |

Three-time defending champion Diede de Groot and her partner Jiske Griffioen defeated Yui Kamiji and Kgothatso Montjane in the final, 6–3, 7–6^{(7–2)} to win the women's doubles wheelchair tennis title at the 2024 Australian Open.

De Groot and Aniek van Koot were the three-time defending champions, but chose not to participate together. Van Koot partnered Lizzy de Greef, but lost to de Groot and Griffioen in the quarterfinals.

== Seeds ==
1. (Japan) Yui Kamiji / (South Africa) Kgothatso Montjane (final)
2. (Netherlands) Diede de Groot / (Netherlands) Jiske Griffioen (champions)

== Draw ==
=== Key ===
- Q = Qualifier
- WC = Wild card
- LL = Lucky loser
- Alt = Alternate
- ITF = ITF entry
- PR = Protected ranking
- SR = Special ranking
- SE = Special exempt
- JE = Junior exempt
- JR = Junior Accelerator Programme entrant
- CO = College Accelerator Programme entrant
- NG = Next Gen Accelerator Program entrant
- w/o = Walkover
- r = Retired
- d = Defaulted

=== Draw ===
Quarterfinals
1 | (Japan) Yui Kamiji (South Africa) Kgothatso Montjane | w/o
(Argentina) María Florencia Moreno (Japan) Momoko Ohtani
(France) Pauline Déroulède (United Kingdom) Lucy Shuker | 5 | 6^{2}
(Colombia) Angélica Bernal (China) Zhu Zhenzhen | 7 | 7^{7}
(United States) Dana Mathewson (Japan) Manami Tanaka | 6 | 6
(Japan) Shiori Funamizu (China) Li Xiaohui | 2 | 2
(Netherlands) Lizzy de Greef (Netherlands) Aniek van Koot | 3 | 2
2 | (Netherlands) Diede de Groot (Netherlands) Jiske Griffioen | 6 | 6

Semifinals
1 | (Japan) Yui Kamiji (South Africa) Kgothatso Montjane | 6 | 6
(Colombia) Angélica Bernal (China) Zhu Zhenzhen | 4 | 3
(United States) Dana Mathewson (Japan) Manami Tanaka | 2 | 0
2 | (Netherlands) Diede de Groot (Netherlands) Jiske Griffioen | 6 | 6

Final
1 | (Japan) Yui Kamiji (South Africa) Kgothatso Montjane | 3 | 6^{2}
2 | (Netherlands) Diede de Groot (Netherlands) Jiske Griffioen | 6 | 7^{7}
