= 2024 Australian Open – Wheelchair quad doubles =

Wheelchair quad doubles
- 2024 Australian Open

Final
- Champions: (United Kingdom) Andy Lapthorne (United States) David Wagner
- Runners-up: (South Africa) Donald Ramphadi (Israel) Guy Sasson
- Score: 6–3, 3–6, [10–2]

Events
Singles	men	women		boys	girls
Doubles	men	women	mixed	boys	girls
WC Singles	men	women	quad	boys	girls
WC Doubles	men	women	quad	boys	girls
- Australian Open

Andy Lapthorne and David Wagner defeated Donald Ramphadi and Guy Sasson in the final, 6–4, 3–6, [10–2] to win the quad doubles wheelchair tennis title at the 2024 Australian Open.

Sam Schröder and Niels Vink were the defending champions, but withdrew from their semifinal match against Ramphadi and Sasson.

== Seeds ==
1. (Netherlands) Sam Schröder / (Netherlands) Niels Vink (semifinals, withdrew)
2. (Australia) Heath Davidson / (Canada) Robert Shaw (semifinals)

== Draw ==
Key

- Q = Qualifier
- WC = Wild card
- LL = Lucky loser
- Alt = Alternate
- ITF = ITF entry
- PR = Protected ranking
- SR = Special ranking
- SE = Special exempt
- JE = Junior exempt
- JR = Junior Accelerator Programme entrant
- CO = College Accelerator Programme entrant
- NG = Next Gen Accelerator Program entrant
- w/o = Walkover
- r = Retired
- d = Defaulted

=== Draw ===
Quarterfinals
1	(Netherlands) Sam Schröder (Netherlands) Niels Vink	6	6
(Chile) Francisco Cayulef (Chile) Diego Pérez	1	2
(Turkey) Ahmet Kaplan (Slovakia) Tomáš Masaryk	5	1
(South Africa) Donald Ramphadi (Israel) Guy Sasson	7	6
(United Kingdom) Andy Lapthorne (United States) David Wagner	6	6
(Turkey) Ali Ataman (Brazil) Ymanitu Silva	0	1
(Australia) Finn Broadbent (United Kingdom) Gregory Slade	0	0
2	(Australia) Heath Davidson (Canada) Robert Shaw	6	6

Semifinals
1	(Netherlands) Sam Schröder (Netherlands) Niels Vink
(South Africa) Donald Ramphadi (Israel) Guy Sasson	w/o
(United Kingdom) Andy Lapthorne (United States) David Wagner	6	6
2	(Australia) Heath Davidson (Canada) Robert Shaw	3	2

Final
(South Africa) Donald Ramphadi (Israel) Guy Sasson	4	6	[2]
(United Kingdom) Andy Lapthorne (United States) David Wagner	6	3	[10]
