= 2024 Australian Open – Girls' singles =

Girls' singles
- 2024 Australian Open

Final
- Champion: (Slovakia) Renáta Jamrichová
- Runner-up: (Australia) Emerson Jones
- Score: 6–4, 6–1

Events
Singles	men	women		boys	girls
Doubles	men	women	mixed	boys	girls
WC Singles	men	women	quad
WC Doubles	men	women	quad
- Australian Open

Renáta Jamrichová defeated Emerson Jones in the final, 6–4, 6–1 to win the girls' singles tennis title at the 2024 Australian Open.

Alina Korneeva was the reigning champion, but decided to participate in the women's singles qualifying instead. She qualified for the main draw, where she lost to Beatriz Haddad Maia in the second round.

== Seeds ==
1. (Slovakia) Renáta Jamrichová (champion)
2. (Japan) Sara Saito (quarterfinals)
3. (Spain) Kaitlin Quevedo (first round)
4. (United Kingdom) Hannah Klugman (third round)
5. (Czech Republic) Tereza Valentová (first round)
6. (Australia) Emerson Jones (final)
7. (Czech Republic) Alena Kovačková (second round)
8. (United States) Iva Jovic (first round)
9. (United States) Tyra Caterina Grant (third round)
10. (Japan) Ena Koike (semifinals)
11. (Spain) Charo Esquiva Bañuls (first round)
12. (United Kingdom) Mingge Xu (quarterfinals)
13. (Serbia) Teodora Kostović (second round)
14. (Japan) Wakana Sonobe (first round)
15. Vlada Mincheva (quarterfinals)
16. (Bulgaria) Iva Ivanova (semifinals)

Click on the seed number of a player to go to their draw section.

== Draw ==
Key

- Q = Qualifier
- WC = Wild card
- LL = Lucky loser
- Alt = Alternate
- ITF = ITF entry
- PR = Protected ranking
- SR = Special ranking
- SE = Special exempt
- JE = Junior exempt
- JR = Junior Accelerator Programme entrant
- CO = College Accelerator Programme entrant
- NG = Next Gen Accelerator Program entrant
- w/o = Walkover
- r = Retired
- d = Defaulted

=== Finals ===
Quarterfinals
1	(Slovakia) Renáta Jamrichová	6	6
WC	(France) Ksenia Efremova	2	1
15	Vlada Mincheva	6^{6}	0
10	(Japan) Ena Koike	7^{8}	6
12	(United Kingdom) Mingge Xu	4	3
16	(Bulgaria) Iva Ivanova	6	6
6	(Australia) Emerson Jones	3	6	6
2	(Japan) Sara Saito	6	1	1

Semifinals
1	(Slovakia) Renáta Jamrichová	6	2	6
10	(Japan) Ena Koike	4	6	3
16	(Bulgaria) Iva Ivanova	4	1
6	(Australia) Emerson Jones	6	6

Final
1	(Slovakia) Renáta Jamrichová	6	6
6	(Australia) Emerson Jones	4	1

=== Top half ===
==== Section 1 ====
First round
1	(Slovakia) Renáta Jamrichová	6	6
(Italy) Francesca Gandolfi	0	2
(Norway) Emily Sartz-Lunde	1	2
(Bulgaria) Yoana Konstantinova	6	6
Q	(United Kingdom) Isabelle Lacy	7^{7}	6
(Poland) Monika Stankiewicz	6^{3}	1
(Australia) Maya Joint	7^{8}	2	6
14	(Japan) Wakana Sonobe	6^{6}	6	2
11	(Spain) Charo Esquiva Bañuls	3	6^{2}
Q	(United Kingdom) Hephzibah Oluwadare	6	7^{7}
WC	(Australia) Koharu Nishikawa	2	2
(United States) Mia Slama	6	6
(Japan) Hayu Kinoshita	6^{4}	6	6
(Morocco) Malak El Allami	7^{7}	3	1
WC	(France) Ksenia Efremova	7^{7}	6
5	(Czech Republic) Tereza Valentová	6^{2}	4

Second round
1	(Slovakia) R Jamrichová	6	6
(Bulgaria) Y Konstantinova	2	1
Q	(United Kingdom) I Lacy	2	1
(Australia) M Joint	6	6
Q	(United Kingdom) H Oluwadare	4	6	4
(United States) M Slama	6	4	6
(Japan) H Kinoshita	2	3
WC	(France) K Efremova	6	6

Third round
1	(Slovakia) R Jamrichová	6	6
(Australia) M Joint	4	3
(United States) M Slama	4	2
WC	(France) K Efremova	6	6

Quarterfinals
1	(Slovakia) R Jamrichová	6	6
WC	(France) K Efremova	2	1

==== Section 2 ====
First round
4	(United Kingdom) Hannah Klugman	6	6
(Chile) Antonia Vergara Rivera	2	3
(Italy) Noemi Basiletti	7	2	5
Q	(Australia) Alana Subasic	5	6	7
(United States) Kate Fakih	6	2	6
(Bulgaria) Rositsa Dencheva	4	6	1
(Ukraine) Yelyzaveta Kotliar	2	4
15	Vlada Mincheva	6	6
10	(Japan) Ena Koike	6	6
WC	(Australia) Renee Alame	2	4
(Netherlands) Rose Marie Nijkamp	6	6
(Brazil) Olivia Carneiro	4	1
Yuliya Perapekhina	6	6
(Benin) Gloriana Nahum	4	6^{r}
(Czech Republic) Vendula Valdmannová	1	7	6
8	(United States) Iva Jovic	6	5	4

Second round
4	(United Kingdom) H Klugman	6	6
Q	(Australia) A Subasic	1	2
(United States) K Fakih	1	6^{3}
15	V Mincheva	6	7^{7}
10	(Japan) E Koike	6	6
(Netherlands) RM Nijkamp	3	2
Y Perapekhina	4	0
(Czech Republic) V Valdmannová	6	6

Third round
4	(United Kingdom) H Klugman	3	5
15	V Mincheva	6	7
10	(Japan) E Koike	6	6
(Czech Republic) V Valdmannová	3	2

Quarterfinals
15	V Mincheva	6^{6}	0
10	(Japan) E Koike	7^{8}	6

=== Bottom half ===
==== Section 3 ====
First round
7	(Czech Republic) Alena Kovačková	6	6
(Argentina) Luna María Cinalli	2	3
WC	(Australia) Kimiko Cooper	0	2
Q	(Sweden) Lea Nilsson	6	6
(Italy) Vittoria Paganetti	6	6
(United States) Alanis Hamilton	2	4
Kristiana Sidorova	6	2	3
12	(United Kingdom) Mingge Xu	1	6	6
16	(Bulgaria) Iva Ivanova	4	6	6
Q	(Denmark) Laura Brunkel	6	4	1
(Kazakhstan) Asylzhan Arystanbekova	1	4
WC	(Australia) Tahlia Kokkinis	6	6
(South Korea) Jang Ga-eul	6	7^{7}
WC	(Japan) Riko Kikawada	4	6^{3}
Q	(United States) Aspen Schuman	7	6
3	(Spain) Kaitlin Quevedo	5	3

Second round
7	(Czech Republic) A Kovačková	4	6	4
Q	(Sweden) L Nilsson	6	1	6
(Italy) V Paganetti	7^{7}	4	2
12	(United Kingdom) M Xu	6^{4}	6	6
16	(Bulgaria) I Ivanova	6	6
WC	(Australia) T Kokkinis	4	1
(South Korea) G-e Jang	6^{5}	1
Q	(United States) A Schuman	7^{7}	6

Third round
Q	(Sweden) L Nilsson	6	4	6^{4}
12	(United Kingdom) M Xu	3	6	7^{10}
16	(Bulgaria) I Ivanova	7	4	6
Q	(United States) A Schuman	5	6	4

Quarterfinals
12	(United Kingdom) M Xu	4	3
16	(Bulgaria) I Ivanova	6	6

==== Section 4 ====
First round
6	(Australia) Emerson Jones	7^{7}	6
Q	Daria Egorova	6^{5}	4
(Israel) Mika Buchnik	2	6	7
(Austria) Ekaterina Perelygina	6	4	5
(Czech Republic) Julie Paštiková	6	6
WC	(Brazil) Carolina Bohrer Martins	0	4
Q	(Japan) Reina Goto	2	3
9	(United States) Tyra Caterina Grant	6	6
13	(Serbia) Teodora Kostović	4	6	6
(Romania) Elena Ruxandra Bertea	6	3	4
(Germany) Julia Stusek	4	3
(United Kingdom) Mika Stojsavljevic	6	6
(Netherlands) Joy de Zeeuw	5	7	6
(Bulgaria) Elizara Yaneva	7	5	4
WC	(Australia) Giselle Isabella Guillen	2	2
2	(Japan) Sara Saito	6	6

Second round
6	(Australia) E Jones	4	6	6
(Israel) M Buchnik	6	3	4
(Czech Republic) J Paštiková	6	2	3
9	(United States) TC Grant	3	6	6
13	(Serbia) T Kostović	1	2
(United Kingdom) M Stojsavljevic	6	6
(Netherlands) J de Zeeuw	6	3	2
2	(Japan) S Saito	3	6	6

Third round
6	(Australia) E Jones	7	6
9	(United States) TC Grant	5	3
(United Kingdom) M Stojsavljevic	2	1
2	(Japan) S Saito	6	6

Quarterfinals
6	(Australia) E Jones	3	6	6
2	(Japan) S Saito	6	1	1

== Qualifying ==
=== Seeds ===
1. (Japan) Shiho Tsujioka (qualifying competition)
2. (United Kingdom) Isabelle Lacy (qualified)
3. (Kazakhstan) Sonja Zhiyenbayeva (first round)
4. (Italy) Gaia Maduzzi (first round)
5. (Japan) Hikari Yamamoto (qualifying competition)
6. (United States) Aspen Schuman (qualified)
7. (Dominican Republic) Anna María Fedotova (first round)
8. (United Kingdom) Gabia Paskauskas (first round)
9. Victoria Milovanova (qualifying competition)
10. (Japan) Reina Goto (qualified)
11. (China) Zhang Junhan (qualifying competition)
12. (Australia) Lily Taylor (first round)
13. (United Kingdom) Hephzibah Oluwadare (qualified)
14. Daria Egorova (qualified)
15. (Germany) Sonja Zhenikhova (qualifying competition)
16. (Thailand) Kamonwan Yodpetch (first round)

=== Qualifiers ===
1. (United Kingdom) Hephzibah Oluwadare
2. (United Kingdom) Isabelle Lacy
3. (Australia) Alana Subasic
4. (Japan) Reina Goto
5. Daria Egorova
6. (United States) Aspen Schuman
7. (Sweden) Lea Nilsson
8. (Denmark) Laura Brunkel

=== Draw ===
==== First qualifier ====
First round
1	(Japan) Shiho Tsujioka	6	6
(Germany) Anna Linn Puls	2	3
(United States) Maya Dutta	4	1
13	(United Kingdom) Hephzibah Oluwadare	6	6

Qualifying competition
1	(Japan) Shiho Tsujioka	6^{3}	4
13	(United Kingdom) Hephzibah Oluwadare	7^{7}	6

==== Second qualifier ====
First round
2	(United Kingdom) Isabelle Lacy	6	6
(Germany) Valentina Steiner	0	1
WC	(Australia) Gabby Gregg	7^{7}	6^{10}	6
16	(Thailand) Kamonwan Yodpetch	6^{4}	7^{12}	3

Qualifying competition
2	(United Kingdom) Isabelle Lacy	5	7	7
WC	(Australia) Gabby Gregg	7	5	5

==== Third qualifier ====
First round
3	(Kazakhstan) Sonja Zhiyenbayeva	3	6	4
WC	(Australia) Alana Subasic	6	1	6
(India) Maaya Rajeshwaran Revathi	2	5
15	(Germany) Sonja Zhenikhova	6	7

Qualifying competition
WC	(Australia) Alana Subasic	6	6
15	(Germany) Sonja Zhenikhova	4	4

==== Fourth qualifier ====
First round
4	(Italy) Gaia Maduzzi	2	6	4
WC	(Australia) Ava Beck	6	3	6
(United States) Allie Bittner	2	3
10	(Japan) Reina Goto	6	6

Qualifying competition
WC	(Australia) Ava Beck	2	2
10	(Japan) Reina Goto	6	6

==== Fifth qualifier ====
First round
5	(Japan) Hikari Yamamoto	6	2
(United States) Olivia Center	0	1^{r}
WC	(Australia) Kristina Tai	0	3
14	Daria Egorova	6	6

Qualifying competition
5	(Japan) Hikari Yamamoto	1	3
14	Daria Egorova	6	6

==== Sixth qualifier ====
First round
6	(United States) Aspen Schuman	7^{7}	6
(Chinese Taipei) Wan I-wen	6^{1}	3
WC	(Australia) Gabrielle Villegas	5	5
11	(China) Zhang Junhan	7	7

Qualifying competition
6	(United States) Aspen Schuman	6	3	7
11	(China) Zhang Junhan	2	6	5

==== Seventh qualifier ====
First round
7	(Dominican Republic) Anna María Fedotova	4	7	4
(Japan) Mona Narita	6	5	6
(Sweden) Lea Nilsson	6	6
12/WC	(Australia) Lily Taylor	4	3

Qualifying competition
(Japan) Mona Narita	2	4
(Sweden) Lea Nilsson	6	6

==== Eighth qualifier ====
First round
8	(United Kingdom) Gabia Paskauskas	6	4	3
(Denmark) Laura Brunkel	1	6	6
(Japan) Kanon Sawashiro	3	1
9	Victoria Milovanova	6	6

Qualifying competition
(Denmark) Laura Brunkel	6	7^{7}
9	Victoria Milovanova	2	6^{2}
