= 2024 Australian Open – Mixed doubles =

Mixed doubles
- 2024 Australian Open

Final
- Champions: (Chinese Taipei) Hsieh Su-wei (Poland) Jan Zieliński
- Runners-up: (United States) Desirae Krawczyk (United Kingdom) Neal Skupski
- Score: 6–7^{(5–7)}, 6–4, [11–9]

Details
- Draw: 32
- Seeds: 8

Events
Singles	men	women		boys	girls
Doubles	men	women	mixed	boys	girls
WC Singles	men	women	quad
WC Doubles	men	women	quad
- Australian Open

Hsieh Su-wei and Jan Zieliński defeated Desirae Krawczyk and Neal Skupski in the final, 6–7^{(5–7)}, 6–4, [11–9] to win the mixed doubles tennis title at the 2024 Australian Open. They saved a championship point en route to Hsieh's seventh major title (and her first on hardcourts), and Zieliński's first. Zieliński became the first Polish champion and finalist at the event. Krawczyk was attempting to complete the career Grand Slam in mixed doubles.

Luisa Stefani and Rafael Matos were the defending champions, but lost in the first round to Heather Watson and Joe Salisbury.

== Seeds ==
1. (Australia) Storm Hunter / (Australia) Matthew Ebden (second round)
2. (United States) Desirae Krawczyk / (United Kingdom) Neal Skupski (final)
3. (Chinese Taipei) Hsieh Su-wei / (Poland) Jan Zieliński (champions)
4. (Chinese Taipei) Chan Hao-ching / (Mexico) Santiago González (first round)
5. (Germany) Laura Siegemund / (Belgium) Sander Gillé (quarterfinals)
6. (Canada) Gabriela Dabrowski / (United States) Nathaniel Lammons (quarterfinals)
7. (United States) Nicole Melichar-Martinez / (Germany) Kevin Krawietz (quarterfinals)
8. (Australia) Ellen Perez / (Netherlands) Jean-Julien Rojer (second round)

== Draw ==
Key

- Q = Qualifier
- WC = Wild card
- LL = Lucky loser
- Alt = Alternate
- ITF = ITF entry
- PR = Protected ranking
- SR = Special ranking
- SE = Special exempt
- JE = Junior exempt
- JR = Junior Accelerator Programme entrant
- CO = College Accelerator Programme entrant
- NG = Next Gen Accelerator Program entrant
- w/o = Walkover
- r = Retired
- d = Defaulted

=== Finals ===
Semifinals
WC	(Australia) Jaimee Fourlis (Australia) Andrew Harris	6^{8}	2
3	(Chinese Taipei) Hsieh Su-wei (Poland) Jan Zieliński	7^{10}	6
WC	(Australia) Olivia Gadecki (Australia) Marc Polmans	4	1
2	(United States) Desirae Krawczyk (United Kingdom) Neal Skupski	6	6

Final
3	(Chinese Taipei) Hsieh Su-wei (Poland) Jan Zieliński	6^{5}	6	[11]
2	(United States) Desirae Krawczyk (United Kingdom) Neal Skupski	7^{7}	4	[9]

=== Top half ===
First round
1	(Australia) S Hunter (Australia) M Ebden	6	6
(Ukraine) L Kichenok (Croatia) M Pavić	3	2
(Kazakhstan) A Danilina (Argentina) A Molteni	4	4
WC	(Australia) J Fourlis (Australia) A Harris	6	6
Alt	(United States) B Mattek-Sands (El Salvador) M Arévalo	3	6^{0}
(Japan) E Shibahara (Belgium) J Vliegen	6	7^{7}
WC	(Australia) Ar Rodionova (Australia) M Purcell	2	4
5	(Germany) L Siegemund (Belgium) S Gillé	6	6
3	(Chinese Taipei) S-w Hsieh (Poland) J Zieliński	6	6
WC	(Australia) K Birrell (Australia) J Peers	2	2
(Netherlands) D Schuurs (Monaco) H Nys	6^{4}	6	[11]
(Japan) M Kato (Germany) T Pütz	7^{7}	2	[9]
L Samsonova (Italy) A Vavassori	6	6
WC	(Australia) D Saville (Australia) L Saville	3	3
WC	(Australia) M Joint (Australia) D Sweeny	2	4
7	(United States) N Melichar-Martinez (Germany) K Krawietz	6	6

Second round
1	(Australia) S Hunter (Australia) M Ebden	4	6^{6}
WC	(Australia) J Fourlis (Australia) A Harris	6	7^{8}
(Japan) E Shibahara (Belgium) J Vliegen	4	4
5	(Germany) L Siegemund (Belgium) S Gillé	6	6
3	(Chinese Taipei) S-w Hsieh (Poland) J Zieliński	6	6
(Netherlands) D Schuurs (Monaco) H Nys	3	2
L Samsonova (Italy) A Vavassori	6^{8}	2
7	(United States) N Melichar-Martinez (Germany) K Krawietz	7^{10}	6

Quarterfinals
WC	(Australia) J Fourlis (Australia) A Harris	7	7
5	(Germany) L Siegemund (Belgium) S Gillé	5	5
3	(Chinese Taipei) S-w Hsieh (Poland) J Zieliński	6	6
7	(United States) N Melichar-Martinez (Germany) K Krawietz	2	3

Semifinals
WC	(Australia) J Fourlis (Australia) A Harris	6^{8}	2
3	(Chinese Taipei) S-w Hsieh (Poland) J Zieliński	7^{10}	6

=== Bottom half ===
First round
6	(Canada) G Dabrowski (United States) N Lammons	6	6
WC	(Australia) P Hon (Australia) A Walton	3	2
(Ukraine) N Kichenok (Argentina) M González	2	2
Alt	Y Sizikova (United Kingdom) J Murray	6	6
(Indonesia) A Sutjiadi (New Zealand) M Venus	2	7^{7}	[10]
(New Zealand) E Routliffe (United States) J Withrow	6	6^{5}	[8]
WC	(Australia) O Gadecki (Australia) M Polmans	6	6^{5}	[12]
4	(Chinese Taipei) H-c Chan (Mexico) S González	4	7^{7}	[10]
8	(Australia) E Perez (Netherlands) J-J Rojer	6^{6}	7^{7}	[12]
(Norway) U Eikeri (Finland) H Heliövaara	7^{8}	6^{4}	[10]
WC	(Brazil) L Stefani (Brazil) R Matos	3	4
Alt	(United Kingdom) H Watson (United Kingdom) J Salisbury	6	6
V Kudermetova (United Kingdom) L Glasspool	7^{8}	5	[11]
(United States) T Townsend (Brazil) M Melo	6^{6}	7	[9]
(Mexico) G Olmos (France) É Roger-Vasselin	2	2
2	(United States) D Krawczyk (United Kingdom) N Skupski	6	6

Second round
6	(Canada) G Dabrowski (United States) N Lammons	6	6
Alt	Y Sizikova (United Kingdom) J Murray	3	4
(Indonesia) A Sutjiadi (New Zealand) M Venus	7	3	[6]
WC	(Australia) O Gadecki (Australia) M Polmans	5	6	[10]
8	(Australia) E Perez (Netherlands) J-J Rojer	3	2
Alt	(United Kingdom) H Watson (United Kingdom) J Salisbury	6	6
V Kudermetova (United Kingdom) L Glasspool	7	5	[7]
2	(United States) D Krawczyk (United Kingdom) N Skupski	5	7	[10]

Quarterfinals
6	(Canada) G Dabrowski (United States) N Lammons	4	6^{7}
WC	(Australia) O Gadecki (Australia) M Polmans	6	7^{9}
Alt	(United Kingdom) H Watson (United Kingdom) J Salisbury	1	4
2	(United States) D Krawczyk (United Kingdom) N Skupski	6	6

Semifinals
WC	(Australia) O Gadecki (Australia) M Polmans	4	1
2	(United States) D Krawczyk (United Kingdom) N Skupski	6	6

== Other entry information ==
=== Wild cards ===
- (Australia) Kimberly Birrell / (Australia) John Peers
- (Australia) Jaimee Fourlis / (Australia) Andrew Harris
- (Australia) Olivia Gadecki / (Australia) Marc Polmans
- (Australia) Priscilla Hon / (Australia) Adam Walton
- (Australia) Maya Joint / (Australia) Dane Sweeny
- (Australia) Arina Rodionova / (Australia) Max Purcell
- (Australia) Daria Saville / (Australia) Luke Saville
- (Brazil) Luisa Stefani / (Brazil) Rafael Matos

=== Alternates ===
- (United States) Bethanie Mattek-Sands / (El Salvador) Marcelo Arévalo
- Yana Sizikova / (United Kingdom) Jamie Murray
- (United Kingdom) Heather Watson / (United Kingdom) Joe Salisbury

=== Withdrawals ===
- (Hungary) Tímea Babos / (India) Rohan Bopanna → replaced by Yana Sizikova / (United Kingdom) Jamie Murray
- (Czech Republic) Barbora Krejčíková / (France) Fabien Reboul → replaced by (United States) Bethanie Mattek-Sands / (El Salvador) Marcelo Arévalo
- (United States) Peyton Stearns / (United States) Rajeev Ram → replaced by (United Kingdom) Heather Watson / (United Kingdom) Joe Salisbury
