= 2024 Australian Open – Wheelchair men's singles =

Wheelchair men's singles
- 2024 Australian Open

Final
- Champion: (Japan) Tokito Oda
- Runner-up: (United Kingdom) Alfie Hewett
- Score: 6–2, 6–4

Details
- Draw: 16
- Seeds: 4

Events
Singles	men	women		boys	girls
Doubles	men	women	mixed	boys	girls
WC Singles	men	women	quad	boys	girls
WC Doubles	men	women	quad	boys	girls
- Australian Open

Tokito Oda defeated defending champion Alfie Hewett in a rematch of the previous year's final, 6–2, 6–4 to win the men's singles wheelchair tennis title at the 2024 Australian Open. It was his first Australian Open title and third major singles title overall.

== Seeds ==
1. (United Kingdom) Alfie Hewett (final)
2. (Japan) Tokito Oda (champion)
3. (Spain) Martín de la Puente (first round)
4. (United Kingdom) Gordon Reid (semifinals)

== Draw ==
Key

- Q = Qualifier
- WC = Wild card
- LL = Lucky loser
- Alt = Alternate
- ITF = ITF entry
- PR = Protected ranking
- SR = Special ranking
- SE = Special exempt
- JE = Junior exempt
- JR = Junior Accelerator Programme entrant
- CO = College Accelerator Programme entrant
- NG = Next Gen Accelerator Program entrant
- w/o = Walkover
- r = Retired
- d = Defaulted

=== Draw ===
First round
1	(United Kingdom) Alfie Hewett	6	7
(Japan) Takashi Sanada	1	5
(Chile) Alexander Cataldo	6	6
WC	(Australia) Anderson Parker	2	2
3	(Spain) Martín de la Puente	6^{4}	6^{5}
(Belgium) Joachim Gérard	7^{7}	7^{7}
(Japan) Daisuke Arai	4	3
(Netherlands) Ruben Spaargaren	6	6
(Netherlands) Tom Egberink	7^{7}	4	6
(United States) Casey Ratzlaff	6^{2}	6	2
(Netherlands) Maikel Scheffers	1	2
4	(United Kingdom) Gordon Reid	6	6
WC	(Australia) Ben Weekes	1	1
(France) Stéphane Houdet	6	6
(Japan) Takuya Miki	3	1
2	(Japan) Tokito Oda	6	6

Quarterfinals
1	(United Kingdom) A Hewett	6	6
(Chile) A Cataldo	0	2
(Belgium) J Gérard	6	7^{7}
(Netherlands) R Spaargaren	2	6^{3}
(Netherlands) T Egberink	5	2
4	(United Kingdom) G Reid	7	6
(France) S Houdet	3	1
2	(Japan) T Oda	6	6

Semifinals
1	(United Kingdom) A Hewett	6	6
(Belgium) J Gérard	4	1
4	(United Kingdom) G Reid	6^{4}	5
2	(Japan) T Oda	7^{7}	7

Final
1	(United Kingdom) A Hewett	2	4
2	(Japan) T Oda	6	6
