= 2024 Australian Open – Wheelchair women's singles =

Wheelchair women's singles
- 2024 Australian Open

Final
- Champion: (Netherlands) Diede de Groot
- Runner-up: (Japan) Yui Kamiji
- Score: 7–5, 6–4

Details
- Draw: 16
- Seeds: 4

Events
Singles	men	women		boys	girls
Doubles	men	women	mixed	boys	girls
WC Singles	men	women	quad
WC Doubles	men	women	quad
← 2023 ·	Australian Open	· 2025 →

Three-time defending champion Diede de Groot defeated Yui Kamiji in a rematch of the previous year's final, 7–5, 6–4 to win the women's singles wheelchair tennis title at the 2024 Australian Open. It was her sixth Australian Open singles title, her 21st major singles title overall, and her 13th consecutive major singles title.

== Seeds ==
1. (Netherlands) Diede de Groot (champion)
2. (Japan) Yui Kamiji (final)
3. (Netherlands) Jiske Griffioen (semifinals)
4. (Japan) Momoko Ohtani (first round, retired)

== Draw ==
=== Key ===
- Q = Qualifier
- WC = Wild card
- LL = Lucky loser
- Alt = Alternate
- ITF = ITF entry
- PR = Protected ranking
- SR = Special ranking
- SE = Special exempt
- JE = Junior exempt
- JR = Junior Accelerator Programme entrant
- CO = College Accelerator Programme entrant
- NG = Next Gen Accelerator Program entrant
- w/o = Walkover
- r = Retired
- d = Defaulted

=== Draw ===
First round
1	(Netherlands) Diede de Groot	6	6
(United Kingdom) Lucy Shuker	3	1
(Argentina) María Florencia Moreno	5	2
(Netherlands) Aniek van Koot	7	6
3	(Netherlands) Jiske Griffioen	6	6
(Japan) Shiori Funamizu	0	4
(China) Li Xiaohui	3	2
(China) Zhu Zhenzhen	6	6
(France) Pauline Déroulède	3	2
(Japan) Manami Tanaka	6	6
(South Africa) Kgothatso Montjane	6	2
4	(Japan) Momoko Ohtani	4	0^{r}
(Colombia) Angélica Bernal	3	6^{3}
(United States) Dana Mathewson	6	7^{7}
(Netherlands) Lizzy de Greef	0	1
2	(Japan) Yui Kamiji	6	6

Quarterfinals
1	(Netherlands) D de Groot	3	6	6
(Netherlands) A van Koot	6	1	0
3	(Netherlands) J Griffioen	6	6
(China) Z Zhu	3	1
(Japan) M Tanaka	2	0
(South Africa) K Montjane	6	6
(United States) D Mathewson	1	0
2	(Japan) Y Kamiji	6	6

Semifinals
1	(Netherlands) D de Groot	6	6
3	(Netherlands) J Griffioen	1	2
(South Africa) K Montjane	1	4
2	(Japan) Y Kamiji	6	6

Final
1	(Netherlands) D de Groot	7	6
2	(Japan) Y Kamiji	5	4
