= 2024 Australian Open – Wheelchair men's doubles =

Wheelchair men's doubles
- 2024 Australian Open

Final
- Champions: (United Kingdom) Alfie Hewett (United Kingdom) Gordon Reid
- Runners-up: (Japan) Takuya Miki (Japan) Tokito Oda
- Score: 6–3, 6–2

Events
Singles	men	women		boys	girls
Doubles	men	women	mixed	boys	girls
WC Singles	men	women	quad	boys	girls
WC Doubles	men	women	quad	boys	girls
- Australian Open

Four-time defending champions Alfie Hewett and Gordon Reid defeated Takuya Miki and Tokito Oda in the final, 6–3, 6–2 to win the men's doubles wheelchair tennis title at the 2024 Australian Open.

== Seeds ==
1. (United Kingdom) Alfie Hewett / (United Kingdom) Gordon Reid (champions)
2. (Belgium) Joachim Gérard / (France) Stéphane Houdet (semifinals)

== Draw ==
Key

- Q = Qualifier
- WC = Wild card
- LL = Lucky loser
- Alt = Alternate
- ITF = ITF entry
- PR = Protected ranking
- SR = Special ranking
- SE = Special exempt
- JE = Junior exempt
- JR = Junior Accelerator Programme entrant
- CO = College Accelerator Programme entrant
- NG = Next Gen Accelerator Program entrant
- w/o = Walkover
- r = Retired
- d = Defaulted

=== Draw ===
Quarterfinals
1	(United Kingdom) Alfie Hewett (United Kingdom) Gordon Reid	6	6
(Australia) Anderson Parker (Australia) Ben Weekes	1	0
(Japan) Daisuke Arai (Japan) Takashi Sanada	6	4	[10]
(Netherlands) Tom Egberink (Netherlands) Ruben Spaargaren	4	6	[7]
(Chile) Alexander Cataldo (United States) Casey Ratzlaff	6^{5}	6^{4}
(Japan) Takuya Miki (Japan) Tokito Oda	7^{7}	7^{7}
(Spain) Martín de la Puente (Netherlands) Maikel Scheffers	2	3
2	(Belgium) Joachim Gérard (France) Stéphane Houdet	6	6

Semifinals
1	(United Kingdom) Alfie Hewett (United Kingdom) Gordon Reid	6	6
(Japan) Daisuke Arai (Japan) Takashi Sanada	3	3
(Japan) Takuya Miki (Japan) Tokito Oda	6	6
2	(Belgium) Joachim Gérard (France) Stéphane Houdet	4	3

Final
1	(United Kingdom) Alfie Hewett (United Kingdom) Gordon Reid	6	6
(Japan) Takuya Miki (Japan) Tokito Oda	3	2
