= Hayden Jones =

Australian tennis player (born 2006)

- Country (sports): Australia
- Born: 30 August 2006 (age 20) Gold Coast, Queensland
- Height: 1.75 m (5 ft 9 in)
- Plays: Right-handed (two-handed backhand)
- Prize money: US $79,873

Singles
- Career record: 0–0 (at ATP Tour level, Grand Slam level, and in Davis Cup)
- Career titles: 0
- Highest ranking: No. 897 (19 October 2026)
- Current ranking: No. 897 (19 October 2026)

Doubles
- Career record: 0–0 (at ATP Tour level, Grand Slam level, and in Davis Cup)
- Career titles: 0
- Highest ranking: No. 602 (3 February 2025)
- Current ranking: No. 1,546 (19 October 2026)

Grand Slam mixed doubles results
- Australian Open: 1R (2025)
- Last updated on: 19 October 2026.

Hayden Jones (born 30 August 2006) is an Australian tennis player. He has a career-high ATP singles ranking of No. 897 achieved on 19 October 2026 and a doubles ranking of No. 602 achieved on 3 February 2025.

He made his debut in a major at the 2025 Australian Open, playing mixed doubles alongside his sister, Emerson. Jones reached an ITF junior combined ranking of world No. 8 on 20 May 2024.

== Early life ==
Jones attended Coomera Anglican College throughout upbringing. His mother, Loretta, is an Olympic silver medallist triathlete and his father, Brad, is a former Australian rules footballer who narrowly missed out on a professional AFL career when he trialled with the Brisbane Bears in 1994. Jones previously trained at the National Tennis Academy in Queensland and currently trains at the KDV Tennis Academy on the Gold Coast.

== Career ==
He reached the semi-finals of the 2023 US Open boys' doubles with his partner Alexander Razeghi, their run including a win over Henry Searle and Tomasz Berkieta.

Jones received a wildcard into the men's qualifying draw for the 2024 Australian Open in January 2024. Competing in the Boys' singles event, he won his first round match against American Jagger Leach, and he reached the quarterfinals with a three set win over Tomasz Berkieta.

After winning back-to-back singles titles in Thailand in March 2024 he moved to a career-high junior world ranking of No.11.

He received a wildcard into qualifying for the 2025 Australian Open in the Men's singles. He made his grand slam debut in the mixed doubles at that championship playing alongside his sister, Emerson Jones. They lost in straight sets in the first round to experienced pair Hsieh Su-Wei and Jan Zielinski.

== Personal life ==
From the Gold Coast, his mother Loretta Harrop won a silver medal at the 2004 Olympic Games in the Triathlon. His father, Brad Jones, played Australian Rules Football for Mount Gravatt Football Club and won the Grogan Medal in 1999. His sister Emerson Jones is also a junior tennis player.
