= 2023 French Open – Wheelchair women's doubles =

Wheelchair women's doubles
- 2023 French Open

Final
- Champions: (Japan) Yui Kamiji (South Africa) Kgothatso Montjane
- Runners-up: (Netherlands) Diede de Groot (Argentina) María Florencia Moreno
- Score: 6–2, 6–3

Events
Singles	men	women		boys	girls
Doubles	men	women	mixed	boys	girls
WC Singles	men	women	quad	boys	girls
WC Doubles	men	women	quad	boys	girls
- French Open

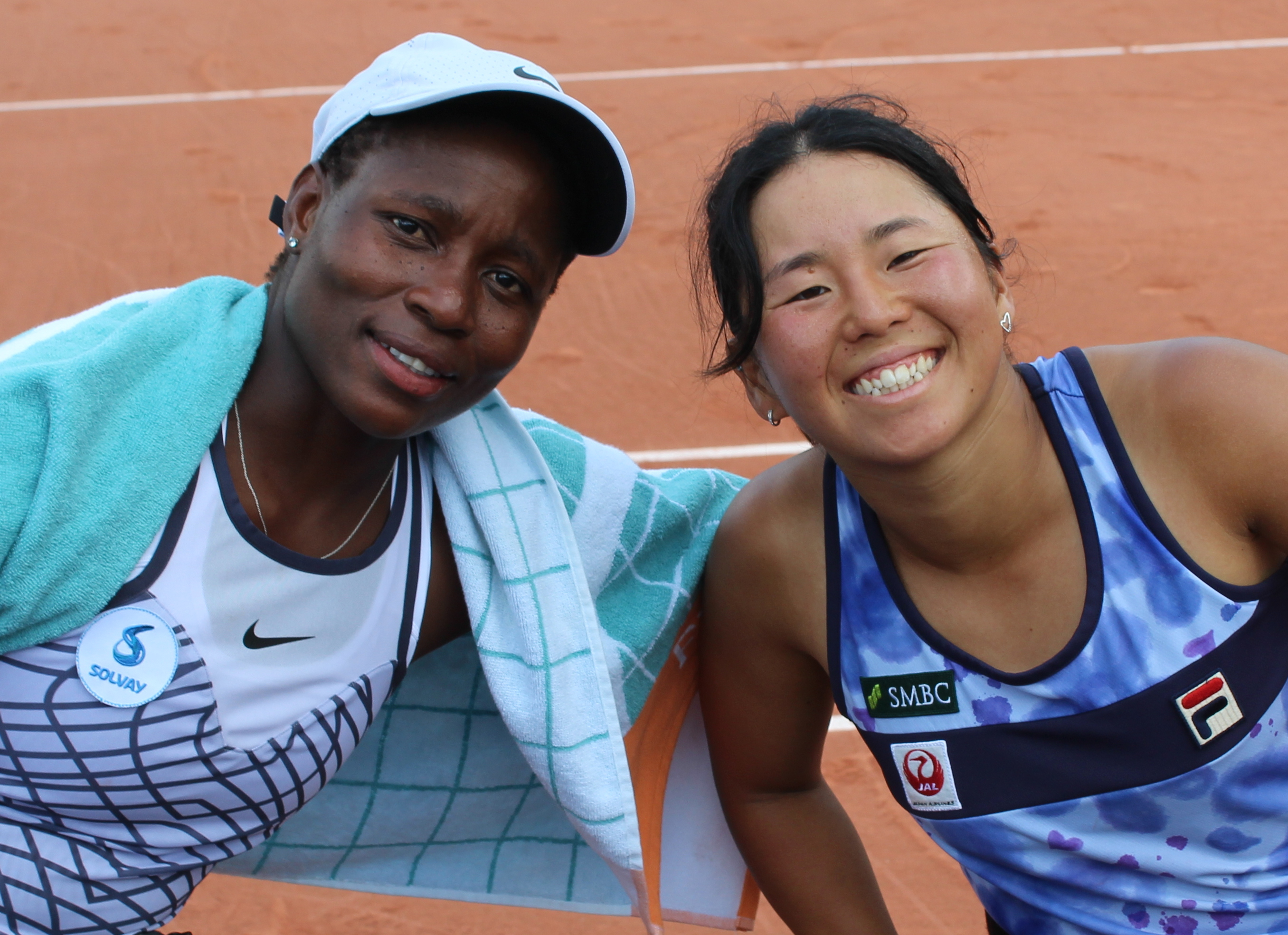
Kgothatso Montjane and Yui Kamiji won the title.

Yui Kamiji and Kgothatso Montjane defeated the five-time defending champion Diede de Groot and her partner María Florencia Moreno in the final, 6–2, 6–3 to win the women's doubles wheelchair tennis title at the 2023 French Open.

De Groot and Aniek van Koot were the five-time reigning champions, but van Koot chose not to participate this year.

== Seeds ==
1. (Japan) Yui Kamiji / (South Africa) Kgothatso Montjane (champions)
2. (Japan) Manami Tanaka / (China) Zhu Zhenzhen (semifinals)

== Draw ==
Key

- Q = Qualifier
- WC = Wild card
- LL = Lucky loser
- Alt = Alternate
- ITF = ITF entry
- PR = Protected ranking
- SR = Special ranking
- SE = Special exempt
- JE = Junior exempt
- JR = Junior Accelerator Programme entrant
- CO = College Accelerator Programme entrant
- NG = Next Gen Accelerator Program entrant
- w/o = Walkover
- r = Retired
- d = Defaulted

=== Finals ===
Quarterfinals
1	(Japan) Yui Kamiji (South Africa) Kgothatso Montjane	6	6
(Colombia) Angélica Bernal (Japan) Shiori Funamizu	1	3
(United States) Dana Mathewson (United Kingdom) Lucy Shuker	6	4	[5]
(France) Pauline Déroulède (France) Emmanuelle Mörch	4	6	[10]
(Netherlands) Diede de Groot (Argentina) María Florencia Moreno	7^{9}	7
(Netherlands) Jiske Griffioen (Japan) Momoko Ohtani	6^{7}	5
(Chile) Macarena Cabrillana (Germany) Katharina Krüger	4	3
2	(Japan) Manami Tanaka (China) Zhu Zhenzhen	6	6

Semifinals
1	(Japan) Yui Kamiji (South Africa) Kgothatso Montjane	6	6
(France) Pauline Déroulède (France) Emmanuelle Mörch	1	2
(Netherlands) Diede de Groot (Argentina) María Florencia Moreno	6	3	[10]
2	(Japan) Manami Tanaka (China) Zhu Zhenzhen	3	6	[6]

Final
1	(Japan) Yui Kamiji (South Africa) Kgothatso Montjane	6	6
(Netherlands) Diede de Groot (Argentina) María Florencia Moreno	2	3
