= 2022 French Open – Wheelchair women's doubles =

Wheelchair women's doubles
- 2022 French Open

Final
- Champions: (Netherlands) Diede de Groot (Netherlands) Aniek van Koot
- Runners-up: (Japan) Yui Kamiji (South Africa) Kgothatso Montjane
- Score: 7–6^{(7–5)}, 1–6, [10–8]

Events
Singles	men	women		boys	girls
Doubles	men	women	mixed	boys	girls
WC Singles	men	women	quad
WC Doubles	men	women	quad
Legends	men	women
- French Open

Four-time defending champions Diede de Groot and Aniek van Koot defeated Yui Kamiji and Kgothatso Montjane in the final, 7–6^{(7–5)}, 1–6, [10–8] to win the women's doubles wheelchair tennis title at the 2022 French Open.

== Seeds ==
1. (Netherlands) Diede de Groot / (Netherlands) Aniek van Koot (champions)
2. (Japan) Yui Kamiji / (South Africa) Kgothatso Montjane (final)

== Draw ==
Key

- Q = Qualifier
- WC = Wild card
- LL = Lucky loser
- Alt = Alternate
- ITF = ITF entry
- PR = Protected ranking
- SR = Special ranking
- SE = Special exempt
- JE = Junior exempt
- JR = Junior Accelerator Programme entrant
- CO = College Accelerator Programme entrant
- NG = Next Gen Accelerator Program entrant
- w/o = Walkover
- r = Retired
- d = Defaulted

=== Finals ===
Quarterfinals
(Japan) Momoko Ohtani (China) Zhu Zhenzhen	6	6
(United States) Dana Mathewson (United Kingdom) Lucy Shuker	2	1
(Colombia) Angélica Bernal (Netherlands) Jiske Griffioen	6^{3}	2
(Chile) Macarena Cabrillana (France) Emmanuelle Mörch	7^{7}	6

Semifinals
1	(Netherlands) Diede de Groot (Netherlands) Aniek van Koot	6	7^{7}
(Japan) Momoko Ohtani (China) Zhu Zhenzhen	2	6^{1}
(Chile) Macarena Cabrillana (France) Emmanuelle Mörch	2	1
2	(Japan) Yui Kamiji (South Africa) Kgothatso Montjane	6	6

Final
1	(Netherlands) Diede de Groot (Netherlands) Aniek van Koot	7^{7}	1	[10]
2	(Japan) Yui Kamiji (South Africa) Kgothatso Montjane	6^{5}	6	[8]
