= Niels Vink =

Dutch wheelchair tennis player

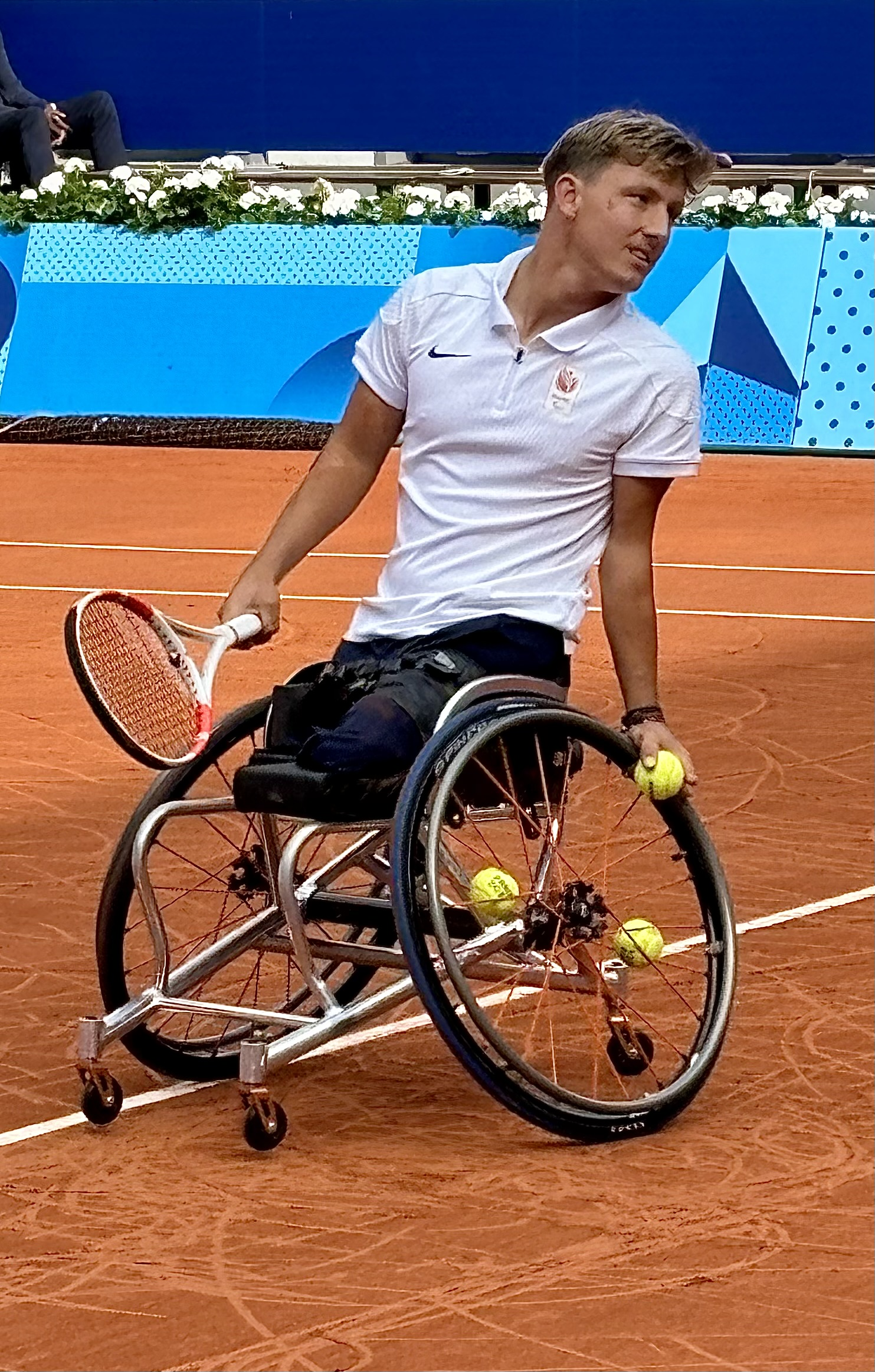
- Vink during the 2024 Paris Summer Paralympics
- Country (sports): Netherlands
- Residence: Helmond, Netherlands
- Born: 6 December 2002 (age 23) Helmond, Netherlands
- Plays: Right-handed (one-handed backhand)

Singles
- Career record: 335–59 (85.0%)
- Career titles: 58 (ITF)
- Highest ranking: 1 (14 March 2022)
- Current ranking: 1 (30 May 2022)

Grand Slam singles results
- Australian Open: W (2026)
- French Open: W (2022, 2023, 2026)
- Wimbledon: W (2023, 2024, 2025, 2026)
- US Open: W (2022, 2025, 2026)

Other tournaments
- Masters: W (2021, 2023, 2024)
- Paralympic Games: W (2024)

Doubles
- Career record: 204–33 (86.1%)
- Career titles: 18
- Highest ranking: 1 (13 September 2021)
- Current ranking: 2 (7 September 2026)

Grand Slam doubles results
- Australian Open: W (2023, 2026)
- French Open: W (2022, 2024, 2025, 2026)
- Wimbledon: W (2022, 2023, 2024, 2025, 2026)
- US Open: W (2021, 2022, 2023, 2025)

Other doubles tournaments
- Masters Doubles: W (2019, 2022, 2023, 2024, 2025)
- Paralympic Games: W (2020, 2024)
Medal record
Men's wheelchair tennis
Representing Netherlands
Paralympic Games
Gold medal – first place	2020 Tokyo	Quad doubles
Gold medal – first place	2024 Paris	Quad singles
Gold medal – first place	2024 Paris	Quad doubles
Bronze medal – third place	2020 Tokyo	Quad singles
European Championships
Gold medal – first place	2023 Rotterdam	Quad singles
- Last updated on: 13 September 2026.

Niels Vink (born 6 December 2002) is a Dutch wheelchair tennis player. He has won ten major singles titles, as well as a gold medal at the 2024 Paris Paralympics to complete the career Golden Slam. Vink has also won 15 major doubles titles, nine partnering Sam Schröder of the Netherlands and six with Guy Sasson of Israel, as well as two Paralympic gold medals to complete the double career Golden Slam.

Born in Helmond, Vink contracted life-threatening meningococcal sepsis at age one, resulting in the amputation of both legs and portions of his hands. Inspired by attending the 2012 London Paralympics as a child, he pursued wheelchair tennis and won the World Junior Championship in 2019. He went on to win a gold and a bronze medal at his Paralympic debut in Tokyo in 2021, followed by a multi-medal performance in Paris three years later.

Beginning in mid-2025, Vink forged a dominant doubles partnership with Guy Sasson. The two won six consecutive major titles spanning the 2025 and 2026 seasons.

== Early life ==
Vink was born in December 2002 in Helmond, the Netherlands. He continues to reside and train in his hometown of Helmond.

At the age of one year, Vink contracted a severe, life-threatening bacterial infection, meningococcal sepsis. Complications required the amputation of both of his legs, as well as several phalanges and small bones in his hands.

At the age of nine, he attended the 2012 Summer Paralympics in London as a spectator with his mother. This is where he was inspired to one day participate in the Paralympic Games. After trying out a few sports, including sitting volleyball and wheelchair basketball, he chose wheelchair tennis.

During his secondary education, he attended and graduated from a specialized sports curriculum. He then studied sport and exercise at Summa College in Eindhoven.

== Wheelchair tennis career ==
=== 2019–25 ===
Vink won the World Junior Championship in 2019. At the Tokyo Paralympic Games held in 2021, he won a gold medal in quad doubles with Sam Schröder of the Netherlands and a bronze medal in quad singles. In 2022, Vink was ranked quad world No. 1, and was named the International Tennis Federation (ITF) World Champion.

At the 2024 Paris Paralympics, Vink defended his quad doubles title and won his first Paralympic singles gold medal.

After initially playing doubles with Schröder, Vink formed a highly successful doubles team with Israeli player Guy Sasson, starting in June 2025. The two dominated the quad doubles circuit, winning consecutive titles at major tournaments. In 2025, the Vink and Sasson won the French Open, Wimbledon, and the U.S. Open doubles championships, as Vink won the singles titles at Wimbledon and the U.S. Open.

=== 2026–present ===
Vink and Sasson began 2026 by winning the 2026 Australian Open quad doubles championship, and Vink won his first Australian Open singles title, completing a career Golden Slam in quad singles.

Vink followed by winning both the quad singles title, and the doubles championship with Sasson for the second consecutive year, at the 2026 French Open.

In July 2026, Vink won the singles title, and he and Sasson won their sixth consecutive Grand Slam doubles title as a team at the 2026 Wimbledon Championships. Following their triumph at Wimbledon, the two praised each other, with Sasson highlighting how seamlessly they complete each other as a team on the court.

As of August 2026, Vink had career totals of 10 major singles titles and 15 major doubles titles. He and Sasson were in a position to try for a calendar-year Grand Slam at the 2026 US Open in September 2026, but were defeated in the final there in a tie-breaker.

== Career statistics ==
=== Performance timelines ===
Key
W	F	SF	QF	#R	RR	Q#	P#	DNQ	A	Z#	PO	G	S	B	NMS	NTI	P	NH

(W) winner; (F) finalist; (SF) semifinalist; (QF) quarterfinalist; (#R) rounds 4, 3, 2, 1; (RR) round-robin stage; (Q#) qualification round; (P#) preliminary round; (DNQ) did not qualify; (A) absent; (Z#) Davis/Fed Cup Zonal Group (with number indication) or (PO) play-off; (G) gold, (S) silver or (B) bronze Olympic/Paralympic medal; (NMS) not a Masters tournament; (NTI) not a Tier I tournament; (P) postponed; (NH) not held; (SR) strike rate (events won / competed); (W–L) win–loss record.
To avoid confusion and double counting, these charts are updated at the conclusion of a tournament or when the player's participation has ended.

==== Quad singles ====
Tournament	2021	2022	2023	2024	2025	2026	SR	W–L
Australian Open	SF	QF	F	SF	F	W	1 / 6	12–5
French Open	A	W	W	SF	F	W	3 / 5	12–2
Wimbledon	A	F	W	W	W	W	4 / 5	14–1
US Open	F	W	F	NH	W	W	3 / 5	16–2
Win–loss	3–2	8–2	11–2	6–2	12–2	14–0	11 / 21	54–10

==== Quad doubles ====
Tournament	2021	2022	2023	2024	2025	2026	SR	W–L
Australian Open	SF	F	W	SF (Note: Withdrew during the tournament. Not counted as a loss.)	F	W	2 / 6	8–3
French Open	A	W	SF	W	W	W	4 / 5	8–1
Wimbledon	A	W	W	W	W	W	5 / 5	10–0
US Open	W	W	W	NH	W	F	4 / 5	12–1
Win–loss	2–1	7–1	7–1	4–0	9–1	9–1	15 / 21	38–5

== Grand Slam tournament finals ==
=== Quad singles: 17 (11 titles, 6 runner-ups) ===
Result	Year	Tournament	Surface	Opponent	Score
Loss	2021	US Open	Hard	(Australia) Dylan Alcott	5–7, 2–6
Win	2022	French Open	Clay	(Netherlands) Sam Schröder	6–4, 7–6^{(10–8)}
Loss	2022	Wimbledon	Grass	(Netherlands) Sam Schröder	6–7^{(5–7)}, 1–6
Win	2022	US Open	Hard	(Netherlands) Sam Schröder	7–5, 6–3
Loss	2023	Australian Open	Hard	(Netherlands) Sam Schröder	2–6, 5–7
Win	2023	French Open	Clay	(Netherlands) Sam Schröder	3–6, 6–4, 6–4
Win	2023	Wimbledon	Grass	(Australia) Heath Davidson	6–1, 6–2
Loss	2023	US Open	Hard	(Netherlands) Sam Schröder	3–6, 5–7
Win	2024	Wimbledon	Grass	(Netherlands) Sam Schröder	7–6^{(7–4)}, 6–4
Loss	2025	Australian Open	Hard	(Netherlands) Sam Schröder	6–7^{(7–9)}, 5–7
Loss	2025	French Open	Clay	(Israel) Guy Sasson	4–6, 5–7
Win	2025	Wimbledon	Grass	(Netherlands) Sam Schröder	6–3, 6–3
Win	2025	US Open	Hard	(Netherlands) Sam Schröder	7–5, 6–3
Win	2026	Australian Open	Hard	(Netherlands) Sam Schröder	6–3, 7–6^{(7–5)}
Win	2026	French Open	Clay	(Turkey) Ahmet Kaplan	6–3, 6–4
Win	2026	Wimbledon	Grass	(Netherlands) Sam Schröder	6–1, 6–3
Win	2026	US Open	Hard	(Netherlands) Sam Schröder	6–2, 7–5

=== Quad doubles: 18 (15 titles, 3 runner-ups) ===
Result	Year	Tournament	Surface	Partner	Opponents	Score
Win	2021	US Open	Hard	(Netherlands) Sam Schröder	(Australia) Dylan Alcott (Australia) Heath Davidson	6–3, 6–2
Loss	2022	Australian Open	Hard	(Netherlands) Sam Schröder	(United Kingdom) Andy Lapthorne (United States) David Wagner	6–2, 4–6, [7–10]
Win	2022	French Open	Clay	(Netherlands) Sam Schröder	(Australia) Heath Davidson (Brazil) Ymanitu Silva	6–2, 6–2
Win	2022	Wimbledon	Grass	(Netherlands) Sam Schröder	(United Kingdom) Andy Lapthorne (United States) David Wagner	6–7^{(4–7)}, 6–2, 6–3
Win	2022	US Open	Hard	(Netherlands) Sam Schröder	(United States) David Wagner (Canada) Robert Shaw	6–1, 6–2
Win	2023	Australian Open	Hard	(Netherlands) Sam Schröder	(South Africa) Donald Ramphadi (Brazil) Ymanitu Silva	6–1, 6–3
Win	2023	Wimbledon	Grass	(Netherlands) Sam Schröder	(Australia) Heath Davidson (Canada) Robert Shaw	7–6^{(7–5)}, 6–0
Win	2023	US Open	Hard	(Netherlands) Sam Schröder	(United Kingdom) Andy Lapthorne (South Africa) Donald Ramphadi	6–1, 6–2
Win	2024	French Open	Clay	(Netherlands) Sam Schröder	(United Kingdom) Andy Lapthorne (Israel) Guy Sasson	7–6^{(11–9)}, 6–1
Win	2024	Wimbledon	Grass	(Netherlands) Sam Schröder	(United Kingdom) Andy Lapthorne (Israel) Guy Sasson	3–6, 7–6^{(7–4)}, 6–3
Loss	2025	Australian Open	Hard	(Israel) Guy Sasson	(United Kingdom) Andy Lapthorne (Netherlands) Sam Schröder	1–6, 4–6
Win	2025	French Open	Clay	(Israel) Guy Sasson	(Turkey) Ahmet Kaplan (South Africa) Donald Ramphadi	6–3, 6–4
Win	2025	Wimbledon	Grass	(Israel) Guy Sasson	(South Africa) Donald Ramphadi (United Kingdom) Gregory Slade	6–0, 6–2
Win	2025	US Open	Hard	(Israel) Guy Sasson	(Chile) Francisco Cayulef (Argentina) Gonzalo Enrique Lazarte	6–1, 6–1
Win	2026	Australian Open	Hard	(Israel) Guy Sasson	(Australia) Heath Davidson (United Kingdom) Andy Lapthorne	6–3, 6–1
Win	2026	French Open	Clay	(Israel) Guy Sasson	(Netherlands) Sam Schröder (Australia) Jin Woodman	6–4, 6–3
Win	2026	Wimbledon	Grass	(Israel) Guy Sasson	(Netherlands) Sam Schröder (Australia) Jin Woodman	6–2, 6–1
Loss	2026	US Open	Hard	(Israel) Guy Sasson	(Netherlands) Sam Schröder (Australia) Jin Woodman	3–6, 6–2, [7–10]

== See also ==
- Netherlands at the Paralympics
- List of quad wheelchair tennis champions
