= 2023 French Open – Wheelchair women's singles =

Wheelchair women's singles
- 2023 French Open

Final
- Champion: (Netherlands) Diede de Groot
- Runner-up: (Japan) Yui Kamiji
- Score: 6–2, 6–0

Events
Singles	men	women		boys	girls
Doubles	men	women	mixed	boys	girls
WC Singles	men	women	quad	boys	girls
WC Doubles	men	women	quad	boys	girls
- French Open

Two-time defending champion Diede de Groot defeated Yui Kamiji in the final, 6–2, 6–0 to win the women's singles wheelchair tennis title at the 2023 French Open. De Groot completed the quadruple career Grand Slam with the win, and claimed her tenth consecutive major singles title. It was the third successive year that de Groot and Kamiji contested the final.

De Groot entered the tournament on a long winning streak in singles, with her most recent defeat being in February 2021. During the tournament de Groot surpassed 100 consecutive singles match wins, with the hundredth win being over Emmanuelle Mörch in the first round.

== Seeds ==
1. (Netherlands) Diede de Groot (champion)
2. (Japan) Yui Kamiji (final)
3. (Netherlands) Jiske Griffioen (semifinals)
4. (Japan) Momoko Ohtani (semifinals)

== Draw ==
Key

- Q = Qualifier
- WC = Wild card
- LL = Lucky loser
- Alt = Alternate
- ITF = ITF entry
- PR = Protected ranking
- SR = Special ranking
- SE = Special exempt
- JE = Junior exempt
- JR = Junior Accelerator Programme entrant
- CO = College Accelerator Programme entrant
- NG = Next Gen Accelerator Program entrant
- w/o = Walkover
- r = Retired
- d = Defaulted

=== Draw ===
First round
1	(Netherlands) D de Groot	6	6
WC	(France) E Mörch	2	2
WC	(France) P Déroulède	6	6
(Japan) Shiori Funamizu	4	2
4	(Japan) M Ohtani	7	6
(Colombia) A Bernal	5	3
(South Africa) K Montjane	6	6
(Japan) M Tanaka	0	0
(United Kingdom) L Shuker	2	2
(United States) D Mathewson	6	6
(Chile) M Cabrillana	4	5
3	(Netherlands) J Griffioen	6	7
(Germany) K Krüger	6	6
(Argentina) M Moreno	3	2
(China) Z Zhu	3	0
2	(Japan) Y Kamiji	6	6

Quarterfinals
1	(Netherlands) D de Groot	6	6
WC	(France) P Déroulède	1	4
4	(Japan) M Ohtani	6	6
(South Africa) K Montjane	0	4
(United States) D Mathewson	4	6	3
3	(Netherlands) J Griffioen	6	0	6
(Germany) K Krüger	1	1
2	(Japan) Y Kamiji	6	6

Semifinals
1	(Netherlands) D de Groot	6	6
4	(Japan) M Ohtani	3	2
3	(Netherlands) J Griffioen	3	2
2	(Japan) Y Kamiji	6	6

Final
1	(Netherlands) D de Groot	6	6
2	(Japan) Y Kamiji	2	0
