= 2022 French Open – Boys' doubles =

Boys' doubles
- 2022 French Open

Final
- Champions: (Lithuania) Edas Butvilas (Croatia) Mili Poljičak
- Runners-up: (Peru) Gonzalo Bueno (Peru) Ignacio Buse
- Score: 6–4, 6–0

Events
Singles	men	women		boys	girls
Doubles	men	women	mixed	boys	girls
WC Singles	men	women	quad
WC Doubles	men	women	quad
Legends	men	women
- French Open

Edas Butvilas and Mili Poljičak won the title, defeating Gonzalo Bueno and Ignacio Buse in the final, 6–4, 6–0.

Arthur Fils and Giovanni Mpetshi Perricard were the defending champions. Fils chose not to compete, while Mpetshi Perricard was no longer eligible to participate in junior events.

== Seeds ==
1. (Lithuania) Edas Butvilas / (Croatia) Mili Poljičak (champions)
2. (Peru) Gonzalo Bueno / (Peru) Ignacio Buse (final)
3. (United States) Nishesh Basavareddy / (United States) Victor Lilov (first round)
4. (United States) Bruno Kuzuhara / (Hong Kong) Coleman Wong (second round)
5. (Czech Republic) Jakub Menšík / (Poland) Olaf Pieczkowski (second round)
6. (Switzerland) Kilian Feldbausch / (France) Paul Inchauspé (first round)
7. (Slovakia) Peter Benjamín Privara / (Croatia) Dino Prižmić (first round)
8. (Paraguay) Daniel Vallejo / (Paraguay) Martín Antonio Vergara del Puerto (second round)

== Draw ==
Key

- Q = Qualifier
- WC = Wild card
- LL = Lucky loser
- Alt = Alternate
- ITF = ITF entry
- PR = Protected ranking
- SR = Special ranking
- SE = Special exempt
- JE = Junior exempt
- JR = Junior Accelerator Programme entrant
- CO = College Accelerator Programme entrant
- NG = Next Gen Accelerator Program entrant
- w/o = Walkover
- r = Retired
- d = Defaulted

=== Finals ===
Semifinals
1	(Lithuania) Edas Butvilas (Croatia) Mili Poljičak	6	3	[10]
(United States) Nicholas Godsick (Portugal) Henrique Rocha	4	6	[8]
(Slovakia) Peter Naď (Poland) Martyn Pawelski	1	4
2	(Peru) Gonzalo Bueno (Peru) Ignacio Buse	6	6

Final
1	(Lithuania) Edas Butvilas (Croatia) Mili Poljičak	6	6
2	(Peru) Gonzalo Bueno (Peru) Ignacio Buse	4	0

=== Top half ===
First round
1	(Lithuania) Edas Butvilas (Croatia) Mili Poljičak	6	6
WC	(France) Gabriel Debru (France) Loann Massard	4	3
(Croatia) Luka Mikrut (Spain) Pedro Ródenas	3	7^{7}	[10]
(Czech Republic) Jakub Nicod (Czech Republic) Vojtěch Petr	6	6^{4}	[5]
Erik Arutiunian (North Macedonia) Kalin Ivanovski	6^{5}	6^{1}
(Czech Republic) Hynek Bartoň (United States) Aidan Kim	7^{7}	7^{7}
(Belgium) Alexander Blockx; Yaroslav Demin	1	2
8	(Paraguay) Daniel Vallejo (Paraguay) Martín Antonio Vergara del Puerto	6	6
3	(United States) Nishesh Basavareddy (United States) Victor Lilov	5	6	[8]
(United States) Nicholas Godsick (Portugal) Henrique Rocha	7	3	[10]
(Brazil) João Fonseca (Bolivia) Juan Carlos Prado Ángelo	6	6
WC	(France) Jules Leroux (France) Théo Papamalamis	3	2
(Sweden) Sebastian Eriksson (Namibia) Connor Henry van Schalkwyk	6	7
(Cyprus) Constantinos Koshis (Spain) Daniel Mérida	4	5
(United States) Ozan Colak (Canada) Jaden Weekes	6	6
7	(Slovakia) Peter Benjamín Privara (Croatia) Dino Prižmić	2	3

Second round
1	(Lithuania) E Butvilas (Croatia) M Poljičak	6	7^{7}
(Croatia) L Mikrut (Spain) P Ródenas	0	6^{2}
(Czech Republic) H Bartoň (United States) A Kim	6	6
8	(Paraguay) D Vallejo (Paraguay) MA Vergara del Puerto	4	3
(United States) N Godsick (Portugal) H Rocha	6	6
(Brazil) J Fonseca (Bolivia) JC Prado Ángelo	1	0
(Sweden) S Eriksson (Namibia) CH van Schalkwyk	4	6	[5]
(United States) O Colak (Canada) J Weekes	6	2	[10]

Quarterfinals
1	(Lithuania) E Butvilas (Croatia) M Poljičak	2	7^{7}	[12]
(Czech Republic) H Bartoň (United States) A Kim	6	6^{3}	[10]
(United States) N Godsick (Portugal) H Rocha	6	6
(United States) O Colak (Canada) J Weekes	4	4

Semifinals
1	(Lithuania) E Butvilas (Croatia) M Poljičak	6	3	[10]
(United States) N Godsick (Portugal) H Rocha	4	6	[8]

=== Bottom half ===
First round
6	(Switzerland) Kilian Feldbausch (France) Paul Inchauspé	4	4
(United States) Alex Michelsen (United States) Michael Zheng	6	6
(Thailand) Tanapatt Nirundorn (Poland) Borys Zgoła	7	6
WC	(France) Arthur Géa (France) Antoine Ghibaudo	5	2
(Slovenia) Bor Artnak (Lithuania) Vilius Gaubas	3	4
(Slovakia) Peter Naď (Poland) Martyn Pawelski	6	6
(United States) Leanid Boika (Australia) Jeremy Jin	6^{3}	1
4	(United States) Bruno Kuzuhara (Hong Kong) Coleman Wong	7^{7}	6
5	(Czech Republic) Jakub Menšík (Poland) Olaf Pieczkowski	6	6
(Switzerland) Mika Brunold (Germany) Liam Gavrielides	2	2
Alt	(France) Wiliam Jucha (France) Loan Lestir	6	6^{5}	[3]
(Switzerland) Dylan Dietrich (Turkey) Togan Tokaç	3	7^{7}	[10]
(Argentina) Juan Manuel La Serna (Argentina) Lautaro Midón	3	4
(Mexico) Rodrigo Pacheco Méndez (United States) Cooper Williams	6	6
(Belgium) Gilles-Arnaud Bailly (South Korea) Gerard Campaña Lee	6	3	[10]
2	(Peru) Gonzalo Bueno (Peru) Ignacio Buse	1	6	[12]

Second round
(United States) A Michelsen (United States) M Zheng	6	1	[10]
(Thailand) T Nirundorn (Poland) B Zgoła	2	6	[7]
(Slovakia) P Naď (Poland) M Pawelski	6	6
4	(United States) B Kuzuhara (Hong Kong) C Wong	3	4
5	(Czech Republic) J Menšík (Poland) O Pieczkowski	6	5	[8]
(Switzerland) D Dietrich (Turkey) T Tokaç	2	7	[10]
(Mexico) R Pacheco Méndez (United States) C Williams	6	6^{3}	[11]
2	(Peru) G Bueno (Peru) I Buse	1	7^{7}	[13]

Quarterfinals
(United States) A Michelsen (United States) M Zheng	2	6	[8]
(Slovakia) P Naď (Poland) M Pawelski	6	3	[10]
(Switzerland) D Dietrich (Turkey) T Tokaç	6^{4}	6^{6}
2	(Peru) G Bueno (Peru) I Buse	7^{7}	7^{8}

Semifinals
(Slovakia) P Naď (Poland) M Pawelski	1	4
2	(Peru) G Bueno (Peru) I Buse	6	6
