= 2022 French Open – Boys' singles =

Boys' singles
- 2022 French Open

Final
- Champion: (France) Gabriel Debru
- Runner-up: (Belgium) Gilles-Arnaud Bailly
- Score: 7–6^{(7–5)}, 6–3

Events
Singles	men	women		boys	girls
Doubles	men	women	mixed	boys	girls
WC Singles	men	women	quad
WC Doubles	men	women	quad
Legends	men	women
- French Open

Gabriel Debru won the title, defeating Gilles-Arnaud Bailly in the final, 7–6^{(7–5)}, 6–3.

Luca Van Assche was the defending champion, but chose to not participate. He received a wildcard into the men's singles qualifying competition, where he lost to Juan Manuel Cerúndolo in the first round.

== Seeds ==
1. (United States) Bruno Kuzuhara (third round)
2. (Paraguay) Daniel Vallejo (second round)
3. (Czech Republic) Jakub Menšík (third round)
4. (Croatia) Mili Poljičak (second round)
5. (United States) Nishesh Basavareddy (first round)
6. (Peru) Gonzalo Bueno (first round)
7. (Switzerland) Kilian Feldbausch (third round)
8. (Argentina) Lautaro Midón (first round)

9. (Lithuania) Edas Butvilas (third round)
10. (Croatia) Dino Prižmić (semifinals)
11. (Peru) Ignacio Buse (second round)
12. (United States) Victor Lilov (first round)
13. (Slovenia) Bor Artnak (first round)
14. (France) Gabriel Debru (champion)
15. (Spain) Martín Landaluce (first round)
16. (Czech Republic) Jakub Nicod (second round)

Click on the seed number of a player to go to their draw section.

== Draw ==
Key

- Q = Qualifier
- WC = Wild card
- LL = Lucky loser
- Alt = Alternate
- ITF = ITF entry
- PR = Protected ranking
- SR = Special ranking
- SE = Special exempt
- JE = Junior exempt
- JR = Junior Accelerator Programme entrant
- CO = College Accelerator Programme entrant
- NG = Next Gen Accelerator Program entrant
- w/o = Walkover
- r = Retired
- d = Defaulted

=== Finals ===
Quarterfinals
(Belgium) Gilles-Arnaud Bailly	6	7
Q	(Switzerland) Dylan Dietrich	3	5
(Poland) Martyn Pawelski	7^{7}	6
(Mexico) Rodrigo Pacheco Méndez	6^{2}	4
10	(Croatia) Dino Prižmić	6	6
(Spain) Daniel Mérida	2	3
(Slovakia) Peter Benjamín Privara	1	2
14	(France) Gabriel Debru	6	6

Semifinals
(Belgium) Gilles-Arnaud Bailly	1	6	6
(Poland) Martyn Pawelski	6	1	2
10	(Croatia) Dino Prižmić	1	6	3
14	(France) Gabriel Debru	6	0	6

Final
(Belgium) Gilles-Arnaud Bailly	6^{5}	3
14	(France) Gabriel Debru	7^{7}	6

=== Top half ===
==== Section 1 ====
First round
1	(United States) Bruno Kuzuhara	6	6
Q	(Turkey) Togan Tokaç	1	3
(France) Sean Cuenin	6	6
(Slovakia) Peter Naď	2	2
(Belgium) Gilles-Arnaud Bailly	6	6
(Canada) Jaden Weekes	3	2
SE	(Argentina) Juan Manuel La Serna	3	6	4
16	(Czech Republic) Jakub Nicod	6	4	6
9	(Lithuania) Edas Butvilas	6	6
(United States) Alex Michelsen	2	4
(Paraguay) Martín Antonio Vergara del Puerto	4	6	6
(Germany) Liam Gavrielides	6	2	2
Q	(France) William Jucha	7^{7}	6
(Namibia) Connor Henry van Schalkwyk	6^{5}	2
Q	(Switzerland) Dylan Dietrich	6	6
6	(Peru) Gonzalo Bueno	1	2

Second round
1	(United States) B Kuzuhara	6	7
(France) S Cuenin	3	5
(Belgium) G-A Bailly	6	6
16	(Czech Republic) J Nicod	2	4
9	(Lithuania) E Butvilas	6	3	6
(Paraguay) MA Vergara del Puerto	2	6	4
Q	(France) W Jucha	2	3
Q	(Switzerland) D Dietrich	6	6

Third round
1	(United States) B Kuzuhara	6	6^{6}	4
(Belgium) G-A Bailly	3	7^{8}	6
9	(Lithuania) E Butvilas	6^{6}	6	4
Q	(Switzerland) D Dietrich	7^{8}	3	6

Quarterfinals
(Belgium) G-A Bailly	6	7
Q	(Switzerland) D Dietrich	3	5

==== Section 2 ====
First round
4	(Croatia) Mili Poljičak	6	7^{7}
WC	(France) Tiago Pires	4	6^{2}
(United States) Michael Zheng	4	6	6
(South Korea) Gerard Campaña Lee	6	1	4
(Bolivia) Juan Carlos Prado Ángelo	6	6
WC	(France) Jules Leroux	1	2
(Poland) Martyn Pawelski	6^{5}	6	7
15	(Spain) Martín Landaluce	7^{7}	1	5
12	(United States) Victor Lilov	6	4	4
(Mexico) Rodrigo Pacheco Méndez	2	6	6
(Czech Republic) Vojtěch Petr	5	7	3
Yaroslav Demin	7	5	6
WC	(France) Antoine Ghibaudo	7^{7}	4	4
(Australia) Jeremy Jin	6^{5}	6	6
(Hong Kong) Coleman Wong	6	3	4
7	(Switzerland) Kilian Feldbausch	4	6	6

Second round
4	(Croatia) M Poljičak	6	1	3
(United States) M Zheng	4	6	6
(Bolivia) JC Prado Ángelo	0	5
(Poland) M Pawelski	6	7
(Mexico) R Pacheco Méndez	5	6	7^{10}
Y Demin	7	2	6^{7}
(Australia) J Jin	1	1
7	(Switzerland) K Feldbausch	6	6

Third round
(United States) M Zheng	2	6^{4}
(Poland) M Pawelski	6	7^{7}
(Mexico) R Pacheco Méndez	5	6	6
7	(Switzerland) K Feldbausch	7	4	0

Quarterfinals
(Poland) M Pawelski	7^{7}	6
(Mexico) R Pacheco Méndez	6^{2}	4

=== Bottom half ===
==== Section 3 ====
First round
5	(United States) Nishesh Basavareddy	6^{4}	3
(Switzerland) Mika Brunold	7^{7}	6
WC	(France) Arthur Géa	6	6
Q	(Sweden) Sebastian Eriksson	3	2
(Belgium) Alexander Blockx	4	6	6
(Lithuania) Vilius Gaubas	6	3	4
Q	(Portugal) Henrique Rocha	1	0
10	(Croatia) Dino Prižmić	6	6
13	(Slovenia) Bor Artnak	6	4	3
WC	(France) Paul Barbier Gazeu	4	6	6
(Spain) Daniel Mérida	6	7
Erik Arutiunian	2	5
(Poland) Olaf Pieczkowski	6	6
WC	(France) Loan Lestir	2	2
(United States) Cooper Williams	3	6	5
3	(Czech Republic) Jakub Menšík	6	3	7

Second round
(Switzerland) M Brunold	2	1
WC	(France) A Géa	6	6
(Belgium) A Blockx	4	3
10	(Croatia) D Prižmić	6	6
WC	(France) P Barbier Gazeu	3	4
(Spain) D Mérida	6	6
(Poland) O Pieczkowski	1	7	2
3	(Czech Republic) J Menšík	6	5	6

Third round
WC	(France) A Géa	6^{3}	2
10	(Croatia) D Prižmić	7^{7}	6
(Spain) D Mérida	7^{7}	7^{8}
3	(Czech Republic) J Menšík	6^{5}	6^{6}

Quarterfinals
10	(Croatia) D Prižmić	6	6
(Spain) D Mérida	2	3

==== Section 4 ====
First round
8	(Argentina) Lautaro Midón	5	5
(Slovakia) Peter Benjamín Privara	7	7
SE	(Thailand) Tanapatt Nirundorn	3	5
WC	(France) Théo Papamalamis	6	7
Q	(Czech Republic) Hynek Bartoň	6	6
(United States) Nicholas Godsick	2	4
(Spain) Pedro Ródenas	4	6	0
11	(Peru) Ignacio Buse	6	4	6
14	(France) Gabriel Debru	6	6
Q	(Croatia) Luka Mikrut	4	3
(United States) Ozan Colak	7^{12}	6
Q	(Poland) Borys Zgoła	6^{10}	2
(North Macedonia) Kalin Ivanovski	7^{7}	4	2
WC	(Brazil) João Fonseca	6^{3}	6	6
(France) Paul Inchauspé	2	7^{7}	1
2	(Paraguay) Daniel Vallejo	6	6^{5}	6

Second round
(Slovakia) PB Privara	3	6	6
WC	(France) T Papamalamis	6	1	3
Q	(Czech Republic) H Bartoň	6	7
11	(Peru) I Buse	4	5
14	(France) G Debru	6	6
(United States) O Colak	3	2
WC	(Brazil) J Fonseca	6	6
2	(Paraguay) D Vallejo	3	4

Third round
(Slovakia) PB Privara	2	6	7^{10}
Q	(Czech Republic) H Bartoň	6	4	6^{1}
14	(France) G Debru	7	6
WC	(Brazil) J Fonseca	5	3

Quarterfinals
(Slovakia) PB Privara	1	2
14	(France) G Debru	6	6

== Qualifying ==
=== Seeds ===
1. (United States) Alexander Frusina (first round)
2. (United States) Ethan Quinn (qualifying competition)
3. (Czech Republic) Hynek Bartoň (qualified)
4. (Belgium) Alessio Basile (first round)
5. (United States) Leanid Boika (first round)
6. (Poland) Borys Zgoła (qualified)
7. (Japan) Hayato Matsuoka (first round)
8. (Cyprus) Constantinos Koshis (first round)
9. (United States) Jonah Braswell (qualifying competition)
10. (United States) Aidan Kim (qualifying competition)
11. (Japan) Lennon Roark Jones (qualifying competition)
12. (Turkey) Togan Tokaç (qualified)
13. (Mexico) Luis Carlos Álvarez Valdés (first round)
14. (United States) Yannik Rahman (first round)
15. (Kazakhstan) Max Batyutenko (first round)
16. (Italy) Daniele Minighini (first round)

=== Qualifiers ===
1. (Sweden) Sebastian Eriksson
2. (Portugal) Henrique Rocha
3. (Czech Republic) Hynek Bartoň
4. (Switzerland) Dylan Dietrich
5. (Turkey) Togan Tokaç
6. (Poland) Borys Zgoła
7. (France) William Jucha
8. (Croatia) Luka Mikrut

=== Draw ===
==== First qualifier ====
First round
1	(United States) Alexander Frusina	6	1	[9]
(South Korea) Shin Woo-bin	1	6	[11]
(Sweden) Sebastian Eriksson	6	6^{4}	[10]
13	(Mexico) Luis Carlos Álvarez Valdés	4	7^{7}	[7]

Qualifying competition
(South Korea) Shin Woo-bin	3	6	[10]
(Sweden) Sebastian Eriksson	6	3	[12]

==== Second qualifier ====
First round
2	(United States) Ethan Quinn	6	6
WC	(France) Igor Mandou Berranger	2	4
(Portugal) Henrique Rocha	6	6
16	(Italy) Daniele Minighini	1	0

Qualifying competition
2	(United States) Ethan Quinn	4	1
(Portugal) Henrique Rocha	6	6

==== Third qualifier ====
First round
3	(Czech Republic) Hynek Bartoň	6	6
WC	(Australia) Charlie Camus	3	1
WC	(France) Thomas Faurel	4	6	[10]
15	(Kazakhstan) Max Batyutenko	6	4	[7]

Qualifying competition
3	(Czech Republic) Hynek Bartoň	6	6
WC	(France) Thomas Faurel	2	1

==== Fourth qualifier ====
First round
4	(Belgium) Alessio Basile	3	2
(Switzerland) Dylan Dietrich	6	6
WC	(France) Loann Massard	2	2
11	(Japan) Lennon Roark Jones	6	6

Qualifying competition
(Switzerland) Dylan Dietrich	7^{7}	7^{7}
11	(Japan) Lennon Roark Jones	6^{5}	6^{1}

==== Fifth qualifier ====
First round
5	(United States) Leanid Boika	1	6	[6]
(Czech Republic) Jan Hrazdil	6	1	[10]
(India) Aman Dahiya	4	0
12	(Turkey) Togan Tokaç	6	6

Qualifying competition
(Czech Republic) Jan Hrazdil	1	2
12	(Turkey) Togan Tokaç	6	6

==== Sixth qualifier ====
First round
6	(Poland) Borys Zgoła	6	6
WC	(France) Andréa M'Chich	4	2
(Australia) Edward Winter	6	6
14	(United States) Yannik Rahman	1	4

Qualifying competition
6	(Poland) Borys Zgoła	3	7	[10]
(Australia) Edward Winter	6	5	[8]

==== Seventh qualifier ====
First round
7	(Japan) Hayato Matsuoka	5	2
WC	(France) William Jucha	7	6
(Chile) Alejandro Bancalari	6	2	[4]
9	(United States) Jonah Braswell	2	6	[10]

Qualifying competition
WC	(France) William Jucha	7	6
9	(United States) Jonah Braswell	5	1

==== Eighth qualifier ====
First round
8	(Cyprus) Constantinos Koshis	1	3
(Croatia) Luka Mikrut	6	6
(Bulgaria) Yanaki Milev	1	4
10	(United States) Aidan Kim	6	6

Qualifying competition
(Croatia) Luka Mikrut	7^{8}	5	[12]
10	(United States) Aidan Kim	6^{6}	7	[10]
