= 2023 French Open – Boys' doubles =

Boys' doubles
- 2023 French Open

Final
- Champions: Yaroslav Demin (Mexico) Rodrigo Pacheco Méndez
- Runners-up: (Italy) Lorenzo Sciahbasi (Italy) Gabriele Vulpitta
- Score: 6–2, 6–3

Events
Singles	men	women		boys	girls
Doubles	men	women	mixed	boys	girls
WC Singles	men	women	quad	boys	girls
WC Doubles	men	women	quad	boys	girls
- French Open

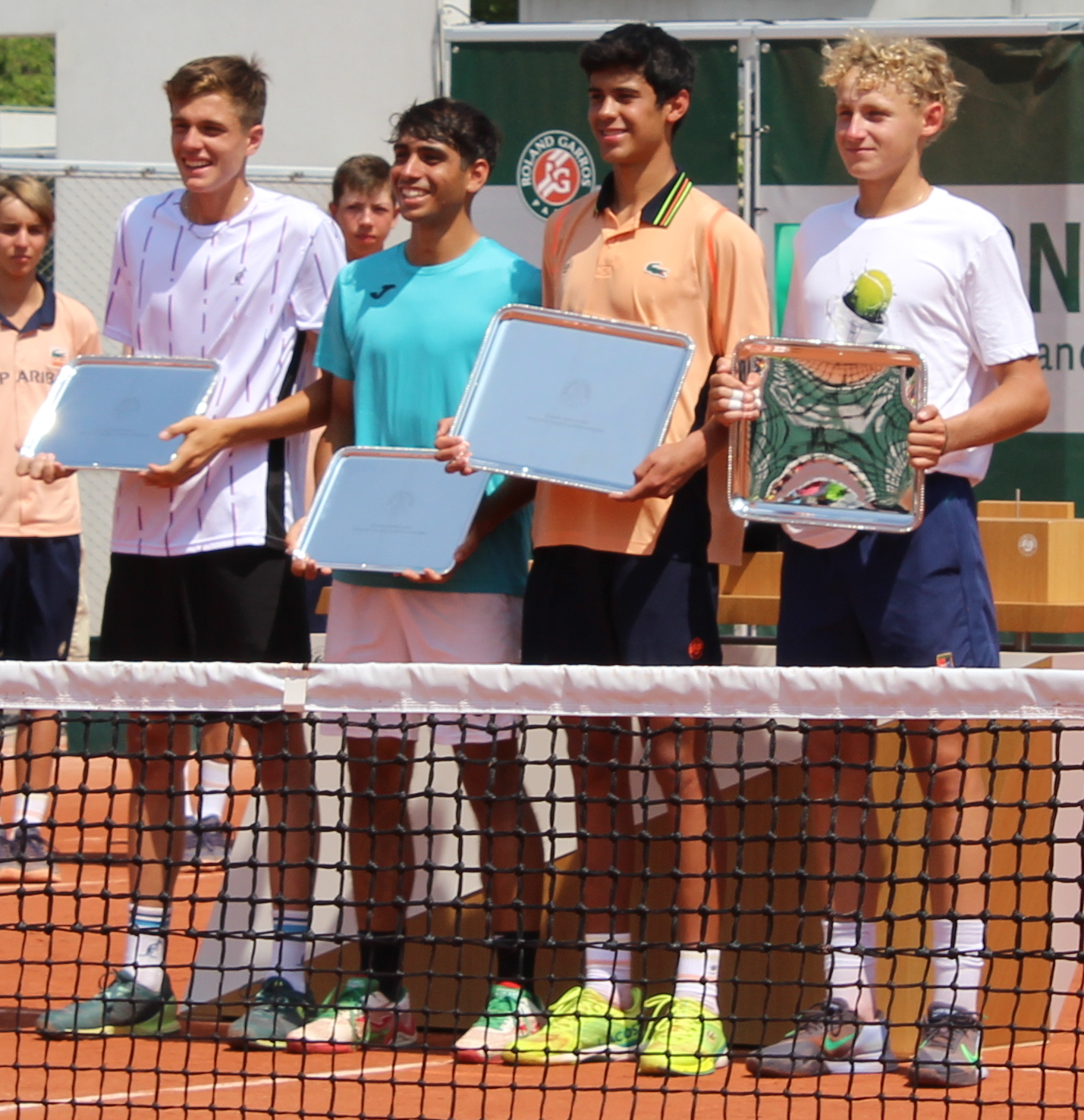
Rodrigo Pacheco Méndez and Yaroslav Demin beat Lorenzo Sciahbasi and Gabriele Vulpitta in the final.

Yaroslav Demin and Rodrigo Pacheco Méndez won the boys' doubles title at the 2023 French Open, defeating Lorenzo Sciahbasi and Gabriele Vulpitta in the final, 6–2, 6–3.

Edas Butvilas and Mili Poljičak were the reigning champions, but were no longer eligible to participate in junior events.

== Seeds ==
1. Yaroslav Demin / (Mexico) Rodrigo Pacheco Méndez (champions)
2. (Estonia) Oliver Ojakäär / (China) Zhou Yi (withdrew)
3. (Bulgaria) Adriano Dzhenev / (Bulgaria) Iliyan Radulov (first round)
4. (Poland) Tomasz Berkieta / (Serbia) Branko Djuric (withdrew)
5. (Italy) Federico Bondioli / (Czech Republic) Maxim Mrva (quarterfinals)
6. (United States) Learner Tien / (United States) Cooper Williams (quarterfinals)
7. (Spain) Alejandro Melero Kretzer / (Austria) Joel Schwärzler (first round)
8. (Italy) Federico Cinà / (Japan) Rei Sakamoto (withdrew)

== Draw ==
Key

- Q = Qualifier
- WC = Wild card
- LL = Lucky loser
- Alt = Alternate
- ITF = ITF entry
- PR = Protected ranking
- SR = Special ranking
- SE = Special exempt
- JE = Junior exempt
- JR = Junior Accelerator Programme entrant
- CO = College Accelerator Programme entrant
- NG = Next Gen Accelerator Program entrant
- w/o = Walkover
- r = Retired
- d = Defaulted

=== Finals ===
Semifinals
1	Yaroslav Demin (Mexico) Rodrigo Pacheco Méndez	6	6
(Germany) David Fix (Germany) Marc Majdandzic	2	4
(Australia) Charlie Camus (Czech Republic) Jan Hrazdil	5	6^{7}
(Italy) Lorenzo Sciahbasi (Italy) Gabriele Vulpitta	7	7^{9}

Final
1	Yaroslav Demin (Mexico) Rodrigo Pacheco Méndez	6	6
(Italy) Lorenzo Sciahbasi (Italy) Gabriele Vulpitta	2	3

=== Top half ===
First round
1	Yaroslav Demin (Mexico) Rodrigo Pacheco Méndez	6	6
(France) Antoine Ghibaudo (United States) Kyle Kang	4	4
WC	(France) Maé Malige (France) Raphaël Vaksmann	6^{5}	6	[10]
(Morocco) Reda Bennani (United Kingdom) Oliver Bonding	7^{7}	3	[12]
(Japan) Hayato Matsuoka (South Korea) Roh Ho-young	3	4
(Netherlands) Thijs Boogaard (Netherlands) Abel Forger	6	6
WC	(France) Jules Leroux (France) Loan Lestir	2	4
6	(United States) Learner Tien (United States) Cooper Williams	6	6
Alt	(Colombia) Alejandro Arcila (United States) Cooper Woestendick	4	2
(United States) Darwin Blanch (United States) Alexander Frusina	6	6
(Brazil) Gustavo Ribeiro de Almeida (Spain) Alejo Sánchez Quílez	3	3
(Germany) David Fix (Germany) Marc Majdandzic	6	6
(Canada) Keegan Rice (United Kingdom) Henry Searle	7	6
WC	(France) Thomas Faurel (France) Théo Papamalamis	5	4
(United States) Maxwell Exsted (Switzerland) Patrick Schön	6	4	[12]
7	(Spain) Alejandro Melero Kretzer (Austria) Joel Schwärzler	3	6	[10]

Second round
1	Y Demin (Mexico) R Pacheco Méndez	w/o
(Morocco) R Bennani (United Kingdom) O Bonding
(Netherlands) T Boogaard (Netherlands) A Forger	3	1
6	(United States) L Tien (United States) C Williams	6	6
(United States) Dar Blanch (United States) A Frusina	6	6^{5}	[8]
(Germany) D Fix (Germany) M Majdandzic	2	7^{7}	[10]
(Canada) K Rice (United Kingdom) H Searle	6	3	[8]
(United States) M Exsted (Switzerland) P Schön	2	6	[10]

Quarterfinals
1	Y Demin (Mexico) R Pacheco Méndez	6	4	[10]
6	(United States) L Tien (United States) C Williams	4	6	[4]
(Germany) D Fix (Germany) M Majdandzic	6	6
(United States) M Exsted (Switzerland) P Schön	3	4

Semifinals
1	Y Demin (Mexico) R Pacheco Méndez	6	6
(Germany) D Fix (Germany) M Majdandzic	2	4

=== Bottom half ===
First round
Alt	(Ukraine) Volodymyr Iakubenko (Czech Republic) Vít Kalina	6	3	[14]
(Sweden) Sebastian Eriksson (Slovenia) Matic Križnik	3	6	[12]
(Australia) Charlie Camus (Czech Republic) Jan Hrazdil	6	6
(Turkey) Atakan Karahan; Danil Panarin	3	1
(France) Paul Barbier Gazeu (Serbia) Vuk Rađenović	6	6
(France) Arthur Géa (France) Tiago Pires	3	2
(United States) Roy Horovitz (United States) Alexander Razeghi	6	1	[10]
3	(Bulgaria) Adriano Dzhenev (Bulgaria) Iliyan Radulov	3	6	[8]
5	(Italy) Federico Bondioli (Czech Republic) Maxim Mrva	6	6
(India) Yuvan Nandal (Sweden) Albert Saar	4	1
WC	(France) Andréa M'Chich (France) Loann Massard	6	6
(Argentina) Fernando Cavallo (South Korea) Kim Jang-jun	3	3
(United States) Kaylan Bigun (Australia) Hayden Jones	4	7^{7}	[8]
(Romania) Mihai Alexandru Coman (Sweden) Kevin Edengren	6	6^{3}	[10]
(Italy) Lorenzo Sciahbasi (Italy) Gabriele Vulpitta	w/o
2	(Estonia) Oliver Ojakäär (China) Zhou Yi

Second round
Alt	(Ukraine) V Iakubenko (Czech Republic) V Kalina	6^{2}	4
(Australia) C Camus (Czech Republic) J Hrazdil	7^{7}	6
(France) P Barbier Gazeu (Serbia) V Rađenović	6	6^{1}	[10]
(United States) R Horovitz (United States) A Razeghi	2	7^{7}	[7]
5	(Italy) F Bondioli (Czech Republic) M Mrva	7	6
WC	(France) A M'Chich (France) L Massard	5	2
(Romania) MA Coman (Sweden) K Edengren	6	4	[9]
(Italy) L Sciahbasi (Italy) G Vulpitta	4	6	[11]

Quarterfinals
(Australia) C Camus (Czech Republic) J Hrazdil	6	2	[11]
(France) P Barbier Gazeu (Serbia) V Rađenović	3	6	[9]
5	(Italy) F Bondioli (Czech Republic) M Mrva	3	2
(Italy) L Sciahbasi (Italy) G Vulpitta	6	6

Semifinals
(Australia) C Camus (Czech Republic) J Hrazdil	5	6^{7}
(Italy) L Sciahbasi (Italy) G Vulpitta	7	7^{9}
