= 2022 French Open – Wheelchair women's singles =

Wheelchair women's singles
- 2022 French Open

Final
- Champion: (Netherlands) Diede de Groot
- Runner-up: (Japan) Yui Kamiji
- Score: 6–4, 6–1

Events
Singles	men	women		boys	girls
Doubles	men	women	mixed	boys	girls
WC Singles	men	women	quad
WC Doubles	men	women	quad
Legends	men	women
- French Open

Defending champion Diede de Groot defeated Yui Kamiji in a rematch of the previous year's final, 6–4, 6–1 to win the women's singles wheelchair tennis title at the 2022 French Open. It was the second step in an eventual Grand Slam for de Groot, and she completed the triple career Grand Slam with the win.

== Seeds ==
1. (Netherlands) Diede de Groot (champion)
2. (Japan) Yui Kamiji (final)
3. (Netherlands) Aniek van Koot (semifinals)
4. (South Africa) Kgothatso Montjane (semifinals)

== Draw ==
Key

- Q = Qualifier
- WC = Wild card
- LL = Lucky loser
- Alt = Alternate
- ITF = ITF entry
- PR = Protected ranking
- SR = Special ranking
- SE = Special exempt
- JE = Junior exempt
- JR = Junior Accelerator Programme entrant
- CO = College Accelerator Programme entrant
- NG = Next Gen Accelerator Program entrant
- w/o = Walkover
- r = Retired
- d = Defaulted

=== Finals ===
First round
WC	(France) E Mörch	6	3	2
(Colombia) A Bernal	3	6	6
(Netherlands) J Griffioen	1	6	6
(United Kingdom) L Shuker	6	3	1
(United States) D Mathewson	6	6
(Chile) M Cabrillana	1	4
(Japan) M Ohtani	3	7^{7}	6
(China) Z Zhu	6	6^{4}	1

Quarterfinals
1	(Netherlands) D de Groot	6	6
(Colombia) A Bernal	2	1
4	(South Africa) K Montjane	6	6
(Netherlands) J Griffioen	3	3
(United States) D Mathewson	6	2	4
3	(Netherlands) A van Koot	4	6	6
(Japan) M Ohtani	6^{5}	6	2
2	(Japan) Y Kamiji	7^{7}	3	6

Semifinals
1	(Netherlands) D de Groot	6	6
4	(South Africa) K Montjane	0	0
3	(Netherlands) A van Koot	2	3
2	(Japan) Y Kamiji	6	6

Final
1	(Netherlands) D de Groot	6	6
2	(Japan) Y Kamiji	4	1
