= 2023 French Open – Boys' singles =

Boys' singles
- 2023 French Open

Final
- Champion: (Croatia) Dino Prižmić
- Runner-up: (Bolivia) Juan Carlos Prado Ángelo
- Score: 6–1, 6–4

Events
Singles	men	women		boys	girls
Doubles	men	women	mixed	boys	girls
WC Singles	men	women	quad	boys	girls
WC Doubles	men	women	quad	boys	girls
- French Open

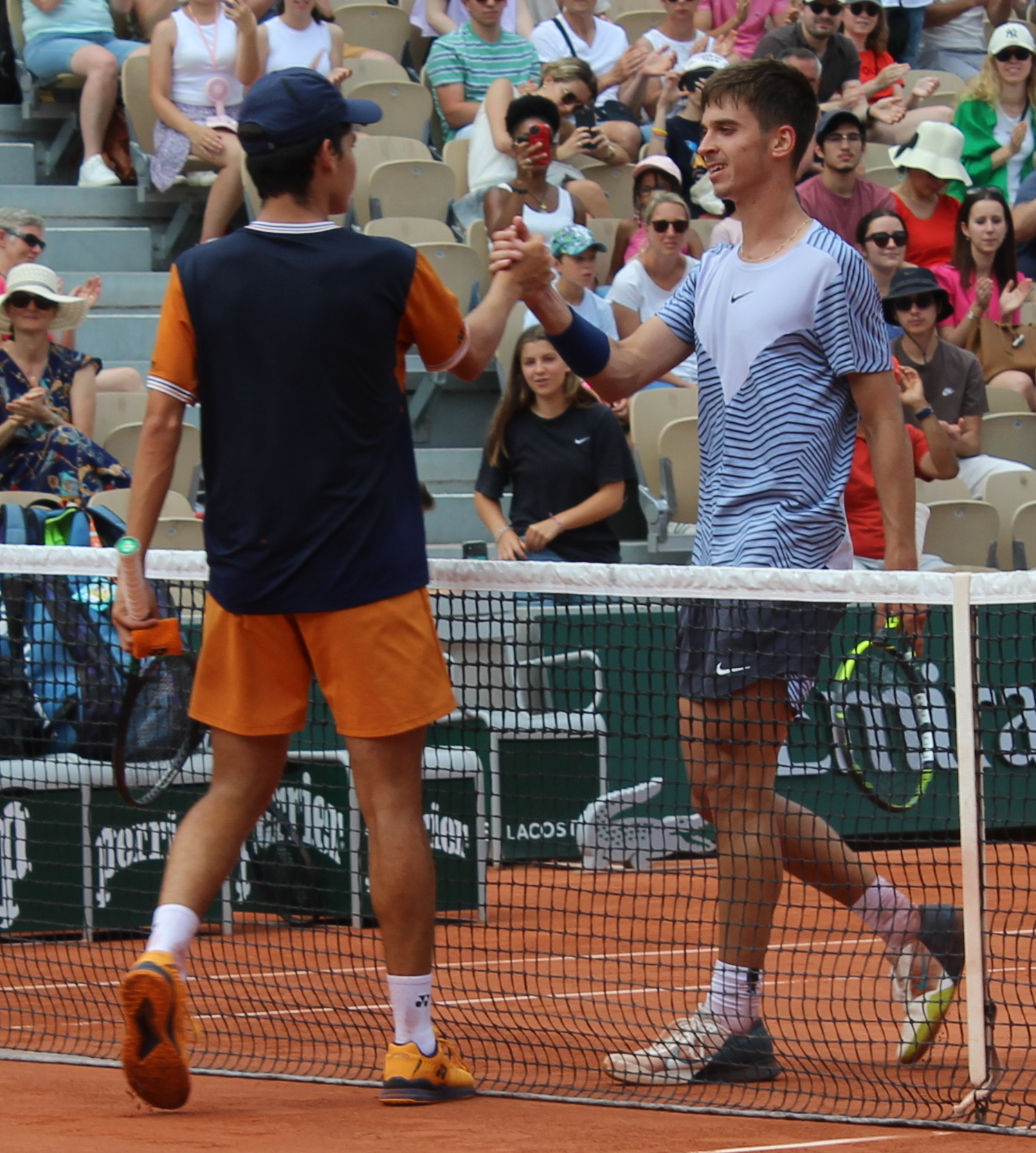
Dino Prižmić (right) beat Juan Carlos Prado Ángelo in the final.

Dino Prižmić won the boys' singles title at the 2023 French Open, defeating Juan Carlos Prado Ángelo in the final, 6–1, 6–4.

Gabriel Debru was the defending champion, but chose not to participate. He received a wildcard into the men's singles qualifying competition, where he lost to Nick Hardt in the first round.

== Seeds ==
1. (Mexico) Rodrigo Pacheco Méndez (first round)
2. (Belgium) Alexander Blockx (third round, retired)
3. (Croatia) Dino Prižmić (champion)
4. (China) Zhou Yi (first round)
5. (Bulgaria) Iliyan Radulov (third round)
6. (Serbia) Branko Djuric (first round)
7. Yaroslav Demin (second round)
8. (Bolivia) Juan Carlos Prado Ángelo (final)
9. (United States) Cooper Williams (quarterfinals)
10. (Brazil) João Fonseca (quarterfinals)
11. (Estonia) Oliver Ojakäär (first round, retired)
12. (Japan) Rei Sakamoto (second round)
13. (Italy) Federico Bondioli (first round)
14. (Bulgaria) Adriano Dzhenev (third round)
15. (Austria) Joel Schwärzler (quarterfinals)
16. (France) Arthur Géa (second round)

== Main draw ==
Key

- Q = Qualifier
- WC = Wild card
- LL = Lucky loser
- Alt = Alternate
- ITF = ITF entry
- PR = Protected ranking
- SR = Special ranking
- SE = Special exempt
- JE = Junior exempt
- JR = Junior Accelerator Programme entrant
- CO = College Accelerator Programme entrant
- NG = Next Gen Accelerator Program entrant
- w/o = Walkover
- r = Retired
- d = Defaulted

=== Finals ===
Quarterfinals
(United States) Darwin Blanch	7^{7}	2	6
9	(United States) Cooper Williams	6^{5}	6	3
3	(Croatia) Dino Prižmić	7^{7}	6
(United Kingdom) Henry Searle	6^{3}	3
8	(Bolivia) Juan Carlos Prado Ángelo	7	6
15	(Austria) Joel Schwärzler	5	3
10	(Brazil) João Fonseca	3	6	1
(United States) Learner Tien	6	2	6

Semifinals
(United States) Darwin Blanch	3	2
3	(Croatia) Dino Prižmić	6	6
8	(Bolivia) Juan Carlos Prado Ángelo	6	7
(United States) Learner Tien	1	5

Final
3	(Croatia) Dino Prižmić	6	6
8	(Bolivia) Juan Carlos Prado Ángelo	1	4

=== Top half ===
==== Section 1 ====
First round
1	(Mexico) Rodrigo Pacheco Méndez	2	5
(United States) Darwin Blanch	6	7
(France) Antoine Ghibaudo	6	7
WC	(Colombia) Alejandro Arcila	0	5
(Romania) Mihai Alexandru Coman	6	6
(Spain) Alejandro Melero Kretzer	4	3
SE	(Brazil) Gustavo Ribeiro de Almeida	4	2
14	(Bulgaria) Adriano Dzhenev	6	6
9	(United States) Cooper Williams	7^{11}	6
(Netherlands) Abel Forger	6^{9}	1
(Sweden) Sebastian Eriksson	6	7^{7}
(Australia) Hayden Jones	4	6^{2}
WC	(France) Théo Papamalamis	6^{2}	3
(Canada) Keegan Rice	7^{7}	6
Q	(Italy) Lorenzo Sciahbasi	7^{7}	7^{7}
6	(Serbia) Branko Djuric	6^{2}	6^{3}

Second round
(United States) Dar Blanch	6	6
(France) A Ghibaudo	3	3
(Romania) MA Coman	1	3
14	(Bulgaria) A Dzhenev	6	6
9	(United States) C Williams	6	6
(Sweden) S Eriksson	3	1
(Canada) K Rice	2	3
Q	(Italy) L Sciahbasi	6	6

Third round
(United States) Dar Blanch	6	6^{4}	6
14	(Bulgaria) A Dzhenev	3	7^{7}	3
9	(United States) C Williams	6	6
Q	(Italy) L Sciahbasi	3	3

Quarterfinals
(United States) Dar Blanch	7^{7}	2	6
9	(United States) C Williams	6^{5}	6	3

==== Section 2 ====
First round
3	(Croatia) Dino Prižmić	6	6
(South Korea) Kim Jang-jun	1	2
(Japan) Hayato Matsuoka	6	6
(United States) Alexander Razeghi	4	4
(Czech Republic) Maxim Mrva	6	6
Q	(Italy) Gabriele Vulpitta	4	3
(Belgium) Emilien Demanet	6^{5}	4
16	(France) Arthur Géa	7^{7}	6
11	(Estonia) Oliver Ojakäär	3	7^{7}	0^{r}
Q	(United States) Maxwell Exsted	6	6^{4}	1
Q	(Germany) David Fix	6	6
WC	(France) Leo Raquillet	3	1
(United Kingdom) Henry Searle	6	6
WC	(France) Thomas Faurel	2	2
Q	(Switzerland) Patrick Schön	3	6^{5}
7	Yaroslav Demin	6	7^{7}

Second round
3	(Croatia) D Prižmić	6	6
(Japan) H Matsuoka	1	3
(Czech Republic) M Mrva	2	6	7
16	(France) A Géa	6	4	5
Q	(United States) M Exsted	3	4
Q	(Germany) D Fix	6	6
(United Kingdom) H Searle	6	6
7	Y Demin	2	3

Third round
3	(Croatia) D Prižmić	4	6	6
(Czech Republic) M Mrva	6	1	0
Q	(Germany) D Fix	1	4
(United Kingdom) H Searle	6	6

Quarterfinals
3	(Croatia) D Prižmić	7^{7}	6
(United Kingdom) H Searle	6^{3}	3

=== Bottom half ===
==== Section 3 ====
First round
8	(Bolivia) Juan Carlos Prado Ángelo	4	6	6
(United States) Kaylan Bigun	6	2	4
(Netherlands) Thijs Boogaard	6	3	5
(Italy) Federico Cinà	3	6	2^{r}
(Czech Republic) Jan Hrazdil	6	6^{4}	6
WC	(France) Tiago Pires	2	7^{7}	3
Q	(Australia) Charlie Camus	7^{9}	1	1
12	(Japan) Rei Sakamoto	6^{7}	6	6
15	(Austria) Joel Schwärzler	2	6	6
(United Kingdom) Oliver Bonding	6	3	3
(Sweden) Kevin Edengren	6	6
WC	(France) Loann Massard	4	0
(United States) Alexander Frusina	2	5
(Argentina) Fernando Cavallo	6	7
Q	(Spain) Alejo Sánchez Quílez	6	6
4	(China) Zhou Yi	4	4

Second round
8	(Bolivia) JC Prado Ángelo	6	6
(Netherlands) T Boogaard	2	3
(Czech Republic) J Hrazdil	7^{9}	6
12	(Japan) R Sakamoto	6^{7}	4
15	(Austria) J Schwärzler	6	6
(Sweden) K Edengren	2	3
(Argentina) F Cavallo	7^{7}	2	6
Q	(Spain) A Sánchez Quílez	6^{5}	6	4

Third round
8	(Bolivia) JC Prado Ángelo	6	6
(Czech Republic) J Hrazdil	4	4
15	(Austria) J Schwärzler	7	6
(Argentina) F Cavallo	5	3

Quarterfinals
8	(Bolivia) JC Prado Ángelo	7	6
15	(Austria) J Schwärzler	5	3

==== Section 4 ====
First round
5	(Bulgaria) Iliyan Radulov	6^{3}	6	6
Danil Panarin	7^{7}	4	1
(France) Paul Barbier Gazeu	6	7
(Slovenia) Matic Križnik	1	5
(India) Yuvan Nandal	1	3
(United States) Roy Horovitz	6	6
WC	(France) Loan Lestir	1	3
10	(Brazil) João Fonseca	6	6
13	(Italy) Federico Bondioli	4	3
(United States) Learner Tien	6	6
WC	(France) Andréa M'Chich	7	6
(Poland) Tomasz Berkieta	5	4
Q	(South Korea) Roh Ho-young	6	3	3
(Morocco) Reda Bennani	1	6	6
(United States) Kyle Kang	4	7	3
2	(Belgium) Alexander Blockx	6	5	6

Second round
5	(Bulgaria) I Radulov	7^{7}	7
(France) P Barbier Gazeu	6^{5}	5
(United States) R Horovitz	3	0
10	(Brazil) J Fonseca	6	6
(United States) L Tien	7^{7}	6
WC	(France) A M'Chich	6^{3}	3
(Morocco) R Bennani	1	0
2	(Belgium) A Blockx	6	6

Third round
5	(Bulgaria) I Radulov	6	2	3
10	(Brazil) J Fonseca	3	6	6
(United States) L Tien	6	0
2	(Belgium) A Blockx	4	0^{r}

Quarterfinals
10	(Brazil) J Fonseca	3	6	1
(United States) L Tien	6	2	6

== Qualifying ==
=== Seeds ===
1. (Australia) Charlie Camus (qualified)
2. (Czech Republic) Jakub Filip (first round)
3. (Ukraine) Volodymyr Iakubenko (first round)
4. (Italy) Gabriele Vulpitta (qualified)
5. (India) Aryan Shah (qualifying competition)
6. (South Korea) Roh Ho-young (qualified)
7. (Czech Republic) Vít Kalina (qualifying competition)
8. (Sweden) Albert Saar (first round)
9. (Turkey) Atakan Karahan (first round)
10. (Czech Republic) Petr Brunclík (qualifying competition)
11. (Serbia) Vuk Rađenović (qualifying competition)
12. (Brazil) Pedro Rodrigues (first round)
13. (United Kingdom) Charlie Robertson (first round)
14. (United States) Cooper Woestendick (qualifying competition)
15. (Switzerland) Patrick Schön (qualified)
16. (United States) Maxwell Exsted (qualified)

=== Qualifiers ===
1. (Australia) Charlie Camus
2. (Italy) Lorenzo Sciahbasi
3. (Germany) David Fix
4. (Italy) Gabriele Vulpitta
5. (United States) Maxwell Exsted
6. (South Korea) Roh Ho-young
7. (Switzerland) Patrick Schön
8. (Spain) Alejo Sánchez Quílez

=== Draw ===
==== First qualifier ====
First round
1	(Australia) Charlie Camus	6	6
WC	(France) Clément Lemire	3	3
(Venezuela) Ignacio Parisca	6	6
12	(Brazil) Pedro Rodrigues	2	0

Qualifying competition
1	(Australia) Charlie Camus	7	6
(Venezuela) Ignacio Parisca	5	3

==== Second qualifier ====
First round
2	(Czech Republic) Jakub Filip	2	1
(Italy) Lorenzo Sciahbasi	6	6
(Argentina) Segundo Goity Zapico	1	2
11	(Serbia) Vuk Rađenović	6	6

Qualifying competition
(Italy) Lorenzo Sciahbasi	6	6
11	(Serbia) Vuk Rađenović	2	1

==== Third qualifier ====
First round
3	(Ukraine) Volodymyr Iakubenko	4	2
(Germany) David Fix	6	6
WC	(France) Evan Jarzaguet	3	0
10	(Czech Republic) Petr Brunclík	6	6

Qualifying competition
(Germany) David Fix	6	6
10	(Czech Republic) Petr Brunclík	4	1

==== Fourth qualifier ====
First round
4	(Italy) Gabriele Vulpitta	6	6
WC	(France) Raphaël Vaksmann	1	3
(Argentina) Gonzalo Zeitune	6	4	6
13	(United Kingdom) Charlie Robertson	4	6	0

Qualifying competition
4	(Italy) Gabriele Vulpitta	6	6
(Argentina) Gonzalo Zeitune	1	4

==== Fifth qualifier ====
First round
5	(India) Aryan Shah	6	6
WC	(France) Maé Malige	3	4
(Serbia) Zoran Ludoški	4	2
16	(United States) Maxwell Exsted	6	6

Qualifying competition
5	(India) Aryan Shah	3	3
16	(United States) Maxwell Exsted	6	6

==== Sixth qualifier ====
First round
6	(South Korea) Roh Ho-young	6	6
(Uzbekistan) Amir Milushev	0	2
(France) Felix Balshaw	0	2
14	(United States) Cooper Woestendick	6	6

Qualifying competition
6	(South Korea) Roh Ho-young	6	6
14	(United States) Cooper Woestendick	2	0

==== Seventh qualifier ====
First round
7	(Czech Republic) Vít Kalina	6	6
(Canada) Duncan Chan	4	1
WC	(France) Jules Leroux	7^{7}	2	5
15	(Switzerland) Patrick Schön	6^{4}	6	7

Qualifying competition
7	(Czech Republic) Vít Kalina	6^{4}	2
15	(Switzerland) Patrick Schön	7^{7}	6

==== Eighth qualifier ====
First round
8	(Sweden) Albert Saar	1	1
(Spain) Alejo Sánchez Quílez	6	6
(Germany) Marc Majdandzic	6	4	6
9	(Turkey) Atakan Karahan	4	6	2

Qualifying competition
(Spain) Alejo Sánchez Quílez	6	7
(Germany) Marc Majdandzic	4	5
