= 2022 French Open – Wheelchair quad doubles =

Wheelchair quad doubles
- 2022 French Open

Final
- Champions: (Netherlands) Sam Schröder (Netherlands) Niels Vink
- Runners-up: (Australia) Heath Davidson (Brazil) Ymanitu Silva
- Score: 6–2, 6–2

Events
Singles	men	women		boys	girls
Doubles	men	women	mixed	boys	girls
WC Singles	men	women	quad
WC Doubles	men	women	quad
Legends	men	women
- French Open

Sam Schröder and Niels Vink defeated Heath Davidson and Ymanitu Silva in the final, 6–2, 6–2 to win the quad doubles wheelchair tennis title at the 2022 French Open.

Andy Lapthorne and David Wagner were the defending champions, but were defeated in the semifinals by Davidson and Silva.

== Seeds ==
1. (Netherlands) Sam Schröder / (Netherlands) Niels Vink (champions)
2. (United Kingdom) Andy Lapthorne / (United States) David Wagner (semifinals)

== Draw ==
Key

- Q = Qualifier
- WC = Wild card
- LL = Lucky loser
- Alt = Alternate
- ITF = ITF entry
- PR = Protected ranking
- SR = Special ranking
- SE = Special exempt
- JE = Junior exempt
- JR = Junior Accelerator Programme entrant
- CO = College Accelerator Programme entrant
- NG = Next Gen Accelerator Program entrant
- w/o = Walkover
- r = Retired
- d = Defaulted

=== Finals ===
Semifinals
1	(Netherlands) Sam Schröder (Netherlands) Niels Vink	6^{6}	6	[10]
(South Africa) Donald Ramphadi (Japan) Koji Sugeno	7^{8}	1	[7]
(Australia) Heath Davidson (Brazil) Ymanitu Silva	1	6	[10]
2	(United Kingdom) Andy Lapthorne (United States) David Wagner	6	4	[8]

Final
1	(Netherlands) Sam Schröder (Netherlands) Niels Vink	6	6
(Australia) Heath Davidson (Brazil) Ymanitu Silva	2	2
