= 2023 French Open – Wheelchair quad doubles =

Wheelchair quad doubles
- 2023 French Open

Final
- Champions: (United Kingdom) Andy Lapthorne (South Africa) Donald Ramphadi
- Runners-up: (Australia) Heath Davidson (Canada) Robert Shaw
- Score: 1–6, 6–2, [10–3]

Events
Singles	men	women		boys	girls
Doubles	men	women	mixed	boys	girls
WC Singles	men	women	quad	boys	girls
WC Doubles	men	women	quad	boys	girls
- French Open

Andy Lapthorne and Donald Ramphadi defeated Heath Davidson and Robert Shaw in the final, 1–6, 6–2, [10–3] to win the quad doubles wheelchair tennis title at the 2023 French Open.

Sam Schröder and Niels Vink were the defending champions, but lost in the semifinals to Lapthorne and Ramphadi.

== Seeds ==
1. (Netherlands) Sam Schröder / (Netherlands) Niels Vink (semifinals)
2. (Australia) Heath Davidson / (Canada) Robert Shaw (final)

== Draw ==
Key

- Q = Qualifier
- WC = Wild card
- LL = Lucky loser
- Alt = Alternate
- ITF = ITF entry
- PR = Protected ranking
- SR = Special ranking
- SE = Special exempt
- JE = Junior exempt
- JR = Junior Accelerator Programme entrant
- CO = College Accelerator Programme entrant
- NG = Next Gen Accelerator Program entrant
- w/o = Walkover
- r = Retired
- d = Defaulted

=== Finals ===
Semifinals
1	(Netherlands) Sam Schröder (Netherlands) Niels Vink	6	4	[6]
(United Kingdom) Andy Lapthorne (South Africa) Donald Ramphadi	4	6	[10]
(Japan) Koji Sugeno (United States) David Wagner	6^{7}	6	[1]
2	(Australia) Heath Davidson (Canada) Robert Shaw	7^{9}	4	[10]

Final
(United Kingdom) Andy Lapthorne (South Africa) Donald Ramphadi	1	6	[10]
2	(Australia) Heath Davidson (Canada) Robert Shaw	6	2	[3]
