= 2023 French Open – Wheelchair men's doubles =

Wheelchair men's doubles
- 2023 French Open

Final
- Champions: (United Kingdom) Alfie Hewett (United Kingdom) Gordon Reid
- Runners-up: (Spain) Martín de la Puente (Argentina) Gustavo Fernández
- Score: 7–6^{(11–9)}, 7–5

Events
Singles	men	women		boys	girls
Doubles	men	women	mixed	boys	girls
WC Singles	men	women	quad	boys	girls
WC Doubles	men	women	quad	boys	girls
- French Open

Three-time defending champions Alfie Hewett and Gordon Reid defeated Martín de la Puente and Gustavo Fernández in the final, 7–6^{(11–9)}, 7–5 to win the men's doubles wheelchair tennis title at the 2023 French Open.

== Seeds ==
1. (United Kingdom) Alfie Hewett / (United Kingdom) Gordon Reid (champions)
2. (Spain) Martín de la Puente / (Argentina) Gustavo Fernández (final)

== Draw ==
Key

- Q = Qualifier
- WC = Wild card
- LL = Lucky loser
- Alt = Alternate
- ITF = ITF entry
- PR = Protected ranking
- SR = Special ranking
- SE = Special exempt
- JE = Junior exempt
- JR = Junior Accelerator Programme entrant
- CO = College Accelerator Programme entrant
- NG = Next Gen Accelerator Program entrant
- w/o = Walkover
- r = Retired
- d = Defaulted

=== Finals ===
Quarterfinals
1	(United Kingdom) Alfie Hewett (United Kingdom) Gordon Reid	6	7
(France) Frédéric Cattaneo (United States) Casey Ratzlaff	2	5
(Netherlands) Maikel Scheffers (Netherlands) Ruben Spaargaren	1	5
(Belgium) Joachim Gérard (Japan) Tokito Oda	6	7
(Chile) Alexander Cataldo (Netherlands) Tom Egberink	0	1
(France) Stéphane Houdet (Japan) Takashi Sanada	6	6
(Japan) Daisuke Arai (Japan) Takuya Miki	1	6^{3}
2	(Spain) Martín de la Puente (Argentina) Gustavo Fernández	6	7^{7}

Semifinals
1	(United Kingdom) Alfie Hewett (United Kingdom) Gordon Reid	6	6
(Belgium) Joachim Gérard (Japan) Tokito Oda	2	2
(France) Stéphane Houdet (Japan) Takashi Sanada	3	3
2	(Spain) Martín de la Puente (Argentina) Gustavo Fernández	6	6

Final
1	(United Kingdom) Alfie Hewett (United Kingdom) Gordon Reid	7^{11}	7
2	(Spain) Martín de la Puente (Argentina) Gustavo Fernández	6^{9}	5
