= 2022 French Open – Wheelchair men's doubles =

Wheelchair men's doubles
- 2022 French Open

Final
- Champions: (United Kingdom) Alfie Hewett (United Kingdom) Gordon Reid
- Runners-up: (Argentina) Gustavo Fernández (Japan) Shingo Kunieda
- Score: 7–6^{(7–5)}, 7–6^{(7–5)}

Events
Singles	men	women		boys	girls
Doubles	men	women	mixed	boys	girls
WC Singles	men	women	quad
WC Doubles	men	women	quad
Legends	men	women
- French Open

Two-time defending champions Alfie Hewett and Gordon Reid defeated Gustavo Fernández and Shingo Kunieda in the final, 7–6^{(7–5)}, 7–6^{(7–5)} to win the men's doubles wheelchair tennis title at the 2022 French Open. It was their tenth consecutive major title.

== Seeds ==
1. (United Kingdom) Alfie Hewett / (United Kingdom) Gordon Reid (champions)
2. (France) Stéphane Houdet / (France) Nicolas Peifer (semifinals)

== Draw ==
Key

- Q = Qualifier
- WC = Wild card
- LL = Lucky loser
- Alt = Alternate
- ITF = ITF entry
- PR = Protected ranking
- SR = Special ranking
- SE = Special exempt
- JE = Junior exempt
- JR = Junior Accelerator Programme entrant
- CO = College Accelerator Programme entrant
- NG = Next Gen Accelerator Program entrant
- w/o = Walkover
- r = Retired
- d = Defaulted

=== Finals ===
Quarterfinals
(France) Guilhem Laget (Japan) Tokito Oda	2	5
(Spain) Daniel Caverzaschi (Spain) Martín de la Puente	6	7
(Netherlands) Tom Egberink (Belgium) Joachim Gérard	3	0
(Argentina) Gustavo Fernández (Japan) Shingo Kunieda	6	6

Semifinals
1	(United Kingdom) Alfie Hewett (United Kingdom) Gordon Reid	6	3	[10]
(Spain) Daniel Caverzaschi (Spain) Martín de la Puente	2	6	[8]
(Argentina) Gustavo Fernández (Japan) Shingo Kunieda	7^{7}	6
2	(France) Stéphane Houdet (France) Nicolas Peifer	6^{0}	1

Final
1	(United Kingdom) Alfie Hewett (United Kingdom) Gordon Reid	7^{7}	7^{7}
(Argentina) Gustavo Fernández (Japan) Shingo Kunieda	6^{5}	6^{5}
