= 2022 French Open – Girls' doubles =

Girls' doubles
- 2022 French Open

Final
- Champions: (Czech Republic) Sára Bejlek (Czech Republic) Lucie Havlíčková
- Runners-up: (Czech Republic) Nikola Bartůňková (Switzerland) Céline Naef
- Score: 6–3, 6–3

Events
Singles	men	women		boys	girls
Doubles	men	women	mixed	boys	girls
WC Singles	men	women	quad
WC Doubles	men	women	quad
Legends	men	women
- French Open

Sára Bejlek and Lucie Havlíčková won the title, defeating Nikola Bartůňková and Céline Naef in the final, 6–3, 6–3.

Alex Eala and Oksana Selekhmeteva were the defending champions, but Selekhmeteva was no longer eligible to participate in junior events, while Eala chose not to participate.

== Seeds ==
1. (Czech Republic) Sára Bejlek / (Czech Republic) Lucie Havlíčková (champions)
2. (Czech Republic) Nikola Bartůňková / (Switzerland) Céline Naef (final)
3. (United States) Liv Hovde / (United States) Qavia Lopez (quarterfinals)
4. (France) Yaroslava Bartashevich / Ksenia Zaytseva (semifinals)
5. Diana Shnaider / (Belgium) Hanne Vandewinkel (quarterfinals)
6. (Croatia) Petra Marčinko / (Denmark) Johanne Svendsen (quarterfinals)
7. (Croatia) Lucija Ćirić Bagarić / (Belgium) Sofia Costoulas (semifinals)
8. (Canada) Kayla Cross / (Canada) Victoria Mboko (first round)

== Draw ==
Key

- Q = Qualifier
- WC = Wild card
- LL = Lucky loser
- Alt = Alternate
- ITF = ITF entry
- PR = Protected ranking
- SR = Special ranking
- SE = Special exempt
- JE = Junior exempt
- JR = Junior Accelerator Programme entrant
- CO = College Accelerator Programme entrant
- NG = Next Gen Accelerator Program entrant
- w/o = Walkover
- r = Retired
- d = Defaulted

=== Finals ===
Semifinals
1	(Czech Republic) Sára Bejlek (Czech Republic) Lucie Havlíčková	6	6
7	(Croatia) Lucija Ćirić Bagarić (Belgium) Sofia Costoulas	4	2
4	(France) Yaroslava Bartashevich; Ksenia Zaytseva	6	1	[7]
2	(Czech Republic) Nikola Bartůňková (Switzerland) Céline Naef	3	6	[10]

Final
1	(Czech Republic) Sára Bejlek (Czech Republic) Lucie Havlíčková	6	6
2	(Czech Republic) Nikola Bartůňková (Switzerland) Céline Naef	3	3

=== Top half ===
First round
1	(Czech Republic) Sára Bejlek (Czech Republic) Lucie Havlíčková	6	2	[10]
Anastasiia Gureva (Greece) Michaela Laki	2	6	[4]
(Canada) Mia Kupres (United Kingdom) Ranah Stoiber	6	6
(Morocco) Aya El Aouni (United States) Kaitlin Quevedo	3	2
WC	(France) Astrid Lew Yan Foon (France) Jenny Lim	w/o
(Australia) Charlotte Kempenaers-Pocz (Australia) Taylah Preston
(Germany) Carolina Kuhl (Czech Republic) Kristýna Tomajková	3	6	[6]
6	(Croatia) Petra Marčinko (Denmark) Johanne Svendsen	6	3	[10]
3	(United States) Liv Hovde (United States) Qavia Lopez	6	4	[11]
Ekaterina Khayrutdinova (Canada) Annabelle Xu	2	6	[9]
(Germany) Ella Seidel (Germany) Joëlle Steur	6	6
(Italy) Georgia Pedone (Czech Republic) Julie Štruplová	4	2
Mirra Andreeva (Czech Republic) Tereza Valentová	6	6
WC	(France) Lucie Pawlak (France) Alice Soulié	1	4
(Hungary) Luca Udvardy (Slovakia) Nina Vargová	3	3
7	(Croatia) Lucija Ćirić Bagarić (Belgium) Sofia Costoulas	6	6

Second round
1	(Czech Republic) S Bejlek (Czech Republic) L Havlíčková	2	6	[10]
(Canada) M Kupres (United Kingdom) RA Stoiber	6	4	[8]
WC	(France) A Lew Yan Foon (France) J Lim	2	4
6	(Croatia) P Marčinko (Denmark) J Svendsen	6	6
3	(United States) L Hovde (United States) Q Lopez	4	6	[10]
(Germany) E Seidel (Germany) J Steur	6	1	[8]
M Andreeva (Czech Republic) T Valentová	5	2
7	(Croatia) L Ćirić Bagarić (Belgium) S Costoulas	7	6

Quarterfinals
1	(Czech Republic) S Bejlek (Czech Republic) L Havlíčková	6	6
6	(Croatia) P Marčinko (Denmark) J Svendsen	4	2
3	(United States) L Hovde (United States) Q Lopez	3	6	[5]
7	(Croatia) L Ćirić Bagarić (Belgium) S Costoulas	6	3	[10]

Semifinals
1	(Czech Republic) S Bejlek (Czech Republic) L Havlíčková	6	6
7	(Croatia) L Ćirić Bagarić (Belgium) S Costoulas	4	2

=== Bottom half ===
First round
8	(Canada) Kayla Cross (Canada) Victoria Mboko	7	3	[6]
(Switzerland) Chelsea Fontenel (Argentina) Solana Sierra	5	6	[10]
(United States) Alexis Blokhina (United States) Sonya Macavei	6	7
WC	(France) Ophélie Boullay (France) Thessy Ntondele Zinga	2	5
(Argentina) Luciana Moyano (Peru) Lucciana Pérez Alarcón	7	6
(Bulgaria) Denislava Glushkova (Japan) Sayaka Ishii	5	2
(Slovakia) Nikola Daubnerová (Belgium) Amelie Van Impe	6^{1}	6	[5]
4	(France) Yaroslava Bartashevich; Ksenia Zaytseva	7^{7}	3	[10]
5	Diana Shnaider (Belgium) Hanne Vandewinkel	6	6
(Andorra) Victoria Jiménez Kasintseva (France) Mathilde Ngijol-Carré	1	1
(Czech Republic) Linda Klimovičová (Czech Republic) Dominika Šalková	6	6
(Argentina) Lucía Peyre (United States) Mia Slama	2	3
WC	(France) Sarah Iliev (France) Tiantsoa Sarah Rakotomanga Rajaonah	6	5	[4]
(Japan) Hayu Kinoshita (Japan) Sara Saito	3	7	[10]
Alevtina Ibragimova (Turkey) Ayşegül Mert	4	1
2	(Czech Republic) Nikola Bartůňková (Switzerland) Céline Naef	6	6

Second round
(Switzerland) C Fontenel (Argentina) S Sierra	4	6	[10]
(United States) A Blokhina (United States) S Macavei	6	3	[7]
(Argentina) L Moyano (Peru) L Pérez Alarcón	4	6^{2}
4	(France) Y Bartashevich; K Zaytseva	6	7^{7}
5	D Shnaider (Belgium) H Vandewinkel	6	6
(Czech Republic) L Klimovičová (Czech Republic) D Šalková	4	3
(Japan) H Kinoshita (Japan) S Saito	2	1
2	(Czech Republic) N Bartůňková (Switzerland) C Naef	6	6

Quarterfinals
(Switzerland) C Fontenel (Argentina) S Sierra	5	5
4	(France) Y Bartashevich; K Zaytseva	7	7
5	D Shnaider (Belgium) H Vandewinkel	4	6	[12]
2	(Czech Republic) N Bartůňková (Switzerland) C Naef	6	0	[14]

Semifinals
4	(France) Y Bartashevich; K Zaytseva	6	1	[7]
2	(Czech Republic) N Bartůňková (Switzerland) C Naef	3	6	[10]
