= 2023 French Open – Girls' singles =

Girls' singles
- 2023 French Open

Final
- Champion: Alina Korneeva
- Runner-up: (Peru) Lucciana Pérez Alarcón
- Score: 7–6^{(7–4)}, 6–3

Events
Singles	men	women		boys	girls
Doubles	men	women	mixed	boys	girls
WC Singles	men	women	quad	boys	girls
WC Doubles	men	women	quad	boys	girls
- French Open

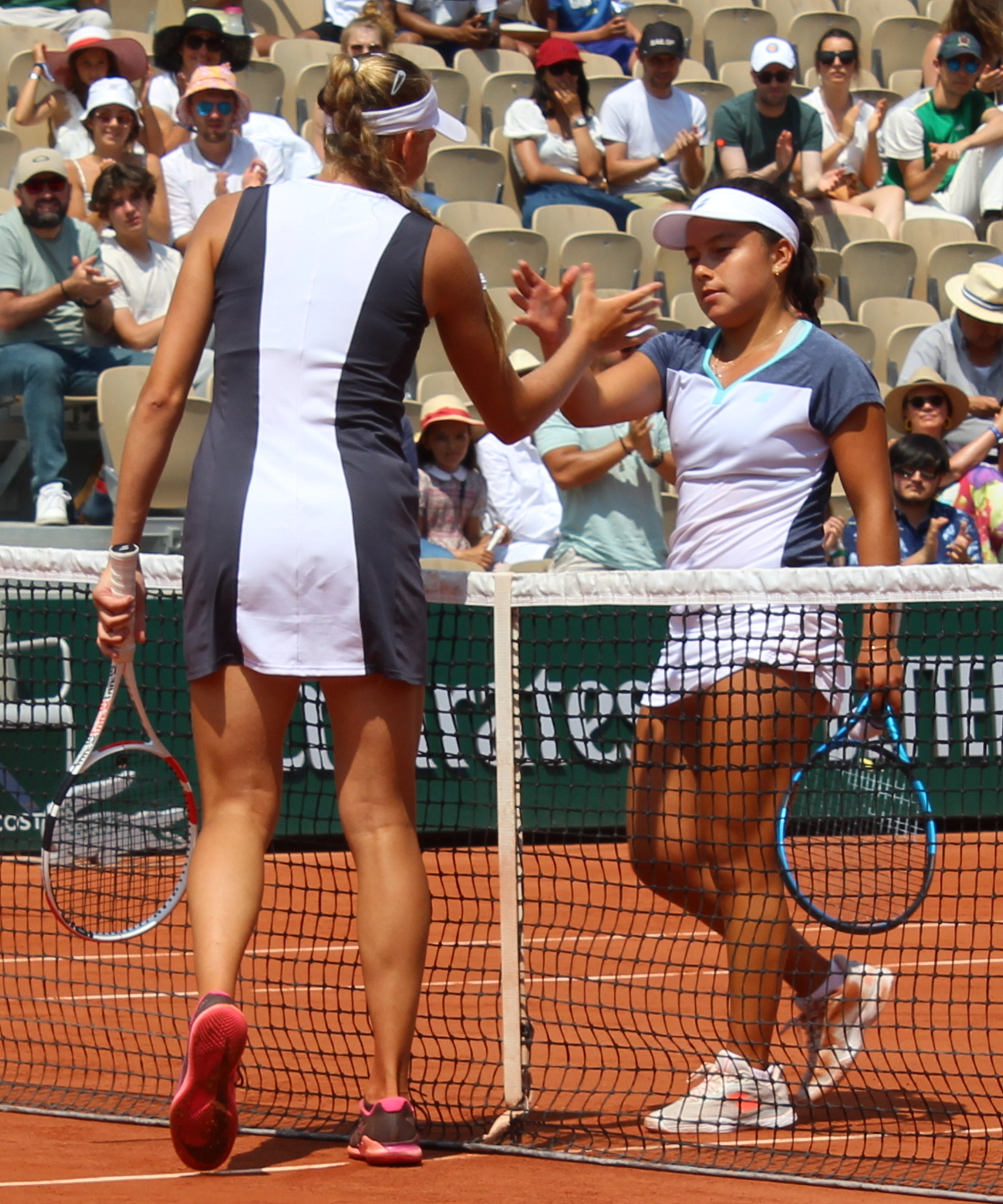
Alina Korneeva (left) beat Lucciana Pérez Alarcón in the final.

Alina Korneeva won the girls' singles title at the 2023 French Open, defeating Lucciana Pérez Alarcón in the final, 7–6^{(7–4)}, 6–3. Korneeva became the first player since Magdalena Maleeva in 1990 to win the first two Grand Slam events in girls' singles in the same year.

Lucie Havlíčková was the defending champion, but chose not to participate.

== Seeds ==
1. (Japan) Sara Saito (second round)
2. (United States) Clervie Ngounoue (quarterfinals)
3. Alina Korneeva (champion)
4. (United States) Kaitlin Quevedo (second round)
5. (Japan) Sayaka Ishii (first round)
6. (Peru) Lucciana Pérez Alarcón (final)
7. (Slovakia) Renáta Jamrichová (third round)
8. (Japan) Mayu Crossley (quarterfinals)
9. (Italy) Federica Urgesi (first round)
10. (Slovakia) Nina Vargová (first round)
11. (Czech Republic) Tereza Valentová (third round)
12. (Japan) Ena Koike (second round)
13. (United Kingdom) Ella McDonald (second round)
14. (United Kingdom) Ranah Stoiber (first round)
15. Vlada Mincheva (second round)
16. (Argentina) Luciana Moyano (first round)

== Main draw ==
Key

- Q = Qualifier
- WC = Wild card
- LL = Lucky loser
- Alt = Alternate
- ITF = ITF entry
- PR = Protected ranking
- SR = Special ranking
- SE = Special exempt
- JE = Junior exempt
- JR = Junior Accelerator Programme entrant
- CO = College Accelerator Programme entrant
- NG = Next Gen Accelerator Program entrant
- w/o = Walkover
- r = Retired
- d = Defaulted

=== Finals ===
Quarterfinals
Alevtina Ibragimova	6	4	6^{5}
6	(Peru) Lucciana Pérez Alarcón	2	6	7^{10}
(Denmark) Rebecca Munk Mortensen	3	6	5
Anastasiia Gureva	6	4	7
8	(Japan) Mayu Crossley	3	3
3	Alina Korneeva	6	6
Q	Alisa Oktiabreva	7	6
2	(United States) Clervie Ngounoue	5	1

Semifinals
6	(Peru) Lucciana Pérez Alarcón	7^{7}	7
Anastasiia Gureva	6^{2}	5
3	Alina Korneeva	6	6
Q	Alisa Oktiabreva	1	1

Final
6	(Peru) Lucciana Pérez Alarcón	6^{4}	3
3	Alina Korneeva	7^{7}	6

=== Top half ===
==== Section 1 ====
First round
1	(Japan) Sara Saito	6	6
WC	(France) Daphnée Mpetshi Perricard	0	3
(United States) Tatum Evans	2	3
(Turkey) Melisa Ercan	6	6
Alevtina Ibragimova	6	6
(Australia) Lily Taylor	1	1
(Serbia) Darja Šuvirđonkova	1	3
13	(United Kingdom) Ella McDonald	6	6
9	(Italy) Federica Urgesi	5	1
Q	(Morocco) Malak El Allami	7	6
(United States) Ariana Anazagasty-Pursoo	5	7	1
WC	(France) Astrid Lew Yan Foon	7	5	6
WC	(Argentina) Sol Ailin Larraya Guidi	4	5
Q	(Czech Republic) Alena Kovačková	6	7
(Slovakia) Nikola Daubnerová	0	3
6	(Peru) Lucciana Pérez Alarcón	6	6

Second round
1	(Japan) S Saito	7^{7}	3	3
(Turkey) M Ercan	6^{4}	6	6
A Ibragimova	6	6
13	(United Kingdom) E McDonald	3	4
Q	(Morocco) M El Allami	4	5
WC	(France) A Lew Yan Foon	6	7
Q	(Czech Republic) A Kovačková	3	1
6	(Peru) L Pérez Alarcón	6	6

Third round
(Turkey) M Ercan	2	6	2
A Ibragimova	6	2	6
WC	(France) A Lew Yan Foon	4	5
6	(Peru) L Pérez Alarcón	6	7

Quarterfinals
A Ibragimova	6	4	6^{5}
6	(Peru) L Pérez Alarcón	2	6	7^{10}

==== Section 2 ====
First round
4	(United States) Kaitlin Quevedo	2	6	6
(United Kingdom) Mingge Xu	6	3	2
SE	(Japan) Wakana Sonobe	4	6^{2}
(Denmark) Rebecca Munk Mortensen	6	7^{7}
(Romania) Mara Gae	6	4	3
(Spain) Charo Esquiva Bañuls	4	6	6
(France) Yaroslava Bartashevich	1	2
15	Vlada Mincheva	6	6
12	(Japan) Ena Koike	6	6
(Czech Republic) Laura Samsonová	2	3
WC	(France) Sarah Iliev	4	2
Anastasiia Gureva	6	6
(Bulgaria) Rositsa Dencheva	5	4
(Germany) Sonja Zhiyenbayeva	7	6
Q	(United States) Tyra Caterina Grant	4	4
7	(Slovakia) Renáta Jamrichová	6	6

Second round
4	(United States) K Quevedo	6^{8}	3
(Denmark) R Munk Mortensen	7^{10}	6
(Spain) C Esquiva Bañuls	7^{7}	6
15	V Mincheva	6^{3}	1
12	(Japan) E Koike	6	6^{5}	3
A Gureva	0	7^{7}	6
(Germany) S Zhiyenbayeva	3	3
7	(Slovakia) R Jamrichová	6	6

Third round
(Denmark) R Munk Mortensen	6	2	7^{10}
(Spain) C Esquiva Bañuls	0	6	6^{2}
A Gureva	6	6
7	(Slovakia) R Jamrichová	2	4

Quarterfinals
(Denmark) R Munk Mortensen	3	6	5
A Gureva	6	4	7

=== Bottom half ===
==== Section 3 ====
First round
8	(Japan) Mayu Crossley	3	6	6
WC	(France) Eleejah Inisan	6	1	1
(Italy) Alessandra Teodosescu	6	6
(Belgium) Amelia Waligora	3	1
(United States) Valeria Ray	6^{5}	3
(Romania) Cara Maria Meșter	7^{7}	6
(Hungary) Luca Udvardy	3	3
11	(Czech Republic) Tereza Valentová	6	6
14	(United Kingdom) Ranah Stoiber	6^{5}	6	2
(Australia) Emerson Jones	7^{7}	4	6
(United States) Mia Slama	3	4
(Japan) Hayu Kinoshita	6	6
Q	(France) Jenny Lim	2	7^{7}	6
Q	(Serbia) Mia Ristić	6	6^{1}	2
(Germany) Ella Seidel	6	6^{4}	5
3	Alina Korneeva	3	7^{7}	7

Second round
8	(Japan) M Crossley	6	6
(Italy) A Teodosescu	1	2
(Romania) CM Meșter	1	2
11	(Czech Republic) T Valentová	6	6
(Australia) E Jones	7^{7}	2	6
(Japan) H Kinoshita	6^{0}	6	3
Q	(France) J Lim	2	1
3	A Korneeva	6	6

Third round
8	(Japan) M Crossley	6	6
11	(Czech Republic) T Valentová	1	3
(Australia) E Jones	1	1
3	A Korneeva	6	6

Quarterfinals
8	(Japan) M Crossley	3	3
3	A Korneeva	6	6

==== Section 4 ====
First round
5	(Japan) Sayaka Ishii	6^{5}	2
(Serbia) Teodora Kostović	7^{7}	6
SE	(United States) Alexia Harmon	6^{4}	6	5
Q	(Austria) Tamara Kostic	7^{7}	3	7
(Morocco) Aya El Aouni	2	6^{3}
Q	Alisa Oktiabreva	6	7^{7}
WC	(France) Tiantsoa Sarah Rakotomanga Rajaonah	6	3	6
10	(Slovakia) Nina Vargová	2	6	4
16	(Argentina) Luciana Moyano	3	6	3
(Italy) Francesca Pace	6	4	6
WC	(France) Margot Phanthala	2	3
(Bulgaria) Iva Ivanova	6	6
(Czech Republic) Amélie Šmejkalová	2	0
Q	(United Kingdom) Hannah Klugman	6	6
WC	(France) Lucie Pawlak	3	1
2	(United States) Clervie Ngounoue	6	6

Second round
(Serbia) T Kostović	6	6
Q	(Austria) T Kostic	1	3
Q	A Oktiabreva	6	7^{7}
WC	(France) TS Rakotomanga Rajaonah	4	6^{2}
(Italy) F Pace	4	4
(Bulgaria) I Ivanova	6	6
Q	(United Kingdom) H Klugman	6^{5}	5
2	(United States) C Ngounoue	7^{7}	7

Third round
(Serbia) T Kostović	6	2	3
Q	A Oktiabreva	4	6	6
(Bulgaria) I Ivanova	1	2
2	(United States) C Ngounoue	6	6

Quarterfinals
Q	A Oktiabreva	7	6
2	(United States) C Ngounoue	5	1

== Qualifying ==
=== Seeds ===
1. (United States) Tyra Caterina Grant (qualified)
2. (Slovenia) Ela Nala Milić (qualifying competition)
3. (Morocco) Malak El Allami (qualified)
4. (Poland) Zuzanna Pawlikowska (qualifying competition)
5. (United States) Theadora Rabman (first round)
6. (United States) Ashton Bowers (qualifying competition)
7. (Ukraine) Yelyzaveta Kotliar (qualifying competition)
8. (Czech Republic) Kristýna Tomajková (qualifying competition)
9. (United Kingdom) Hannah Klugman (qualified)
10. (Italy) Emma Ottavia Ghirardato (qualifying competition)
11. (Czech Republic) Alena Kovačková (qualified)
12. (Japan) Shiho Tsujioka (first round)
13. (South Korea) Kim Yu-jin (first round)
14. (United Kingdom) Hephzibah Oluwadare (qualifying competition)
15. (Austria) Tamara Kostic (qualified)
16. Alisa Oktiabreva (qualified)

=== Qualifiers ===
1. (United States) Tyra Caterina Grant
2. (Austria) Tamara Kostic
3. (Morocco) Malak El Allami
4. (United Kingdom) Hannah Klugman
5. Alisa Oktiabreva
6. (Serbia) Mia Ristić
7. (Czech Republic) Alena Kovačková
8. (France) Jenny Lim

=== Draw ===
==== First qualifier ====
First round
1	(United States) Tyra Caterina Grant	6	6
WC	(France) Eva Marie Desvignes	0	0
WC	(France) Mathilde Ngijol-Carré	2	2
14	(United Kingdom) Hephzibah Oluwadare	6	6

Qualifying competition
1	(United States) Tyra Caterina Grant	6	6
(United Kingdom) Hephzibah Oluwadare	0	1

==== Second qualifier ====
First round
2	(Slovenia) Ela Nala Milić	6	6
(Bulgaria) Yoana Konstantinova	4	2
(Australia) Maya Joint	7	5	4
15	(Austria) Tamara Kostic	1	7	6

Qualifying competition
2	(Slovenia) Ela Nala Milić	6	4	1
15	(Austria) Tamara Kostic	4	6	6

==== Third qualifier ====
First round
3	(Morocco) Malak El Allami	6	6
(United States) Anya Murthy	3	2
(Canada) Naomi Xu	4	6^{5}
10	(Italy) Emma Ottavia Ghirardato	6	7^{7}

Qualifying competition
3	(Morocco) Malak El Allami	6	6
10	(Italy) Emma Ottavia Ghirardato	2	3

==== Fourth qualifier ====
First round
4	(Poland) Zuzanna Pawlikowska	6	6
WC	(France) Dune Vaissaud	3	5
Anastasia Grechkina	2	2
9	(United Kingdom) Hannah Klugman	6	6

Qualifying competition
4	(Poland) Zuzanna Pawlikowska	2	3
9	(United Kingdom) Hannah Klugman	6	6

==== Fifth qualifier ====
First round
5	(United States) Theadora Rabman	4	3
(Italy) Francesca Gandolfi	6	6
(Poland) Monika Stankiewicz	7^{7}	0	4
16	Alisa Oktiabreva	6^{5}	6	6

Qualifying competition
(Italy) Francesca Gandolfi	4	4
16	Alisa Oktiabreva	6	6

==== Sixth qualifier ====
First round
6	(United States) Ashton Bowers	6	6
WC	(France) Zlata Bartanusz	1	0
(Serbia) Mia Ristić	6	6
12	(Japan) Shiho Tsujioka	2	2

Qualifying competition
6	(United States) Ashton Bowers	1	1
(Serbia) Mia Ristić	6	6

==== Seventh qualifier ====
First round
7	(Ukraine) Yelyzaveta Kotliar	1	6	6
(Germany) Josy Daems	6	3	0
WC	(France) Massiva Boukirat	0	2
11	(Czech Republic) Alena Kovačková	6	6

Qualifying competition
7	(Ukraine) Yelyzaveta Kotliar	1	2
11	(Czech Republic) Alena Kovačková	6	6

==== Eighth qualifier ====
First round
8	(Czech Republic) Kristýna Tomajková	6	7
(Chile) Antonia Vergara Rivera	2	5
WC	(France) Jenny Lim	7	6
13	(South Korea) Kim Yu-jin	5	2

Qualifying competition
8	(Czech Republic) Kristýna Tomajková	4	5
WC	(France) Jenny Lim	6	7
