= 2023 French Open – Wheelchair quad singles =

Wheelchair quad singles
- 2023 French Open

Final
- Champion: (Netherlands) Niels Vink
- Runner-up: (Netherlands) Sam Schröder
- Score: 3–6, 6–4, 6–4

Events
Singles	men	women		boys	girls
Doubles	men	women	mixed	boys	girls
WC Singles	men	women	quad	boys	girls
WC Doubles	men	women	quad	boys	girls
- French Open

Defending champion Niels Vink defeated Sam Schröder in a rematch of the previous year's final, 3–6, 6–4, 6–4 to win the quad singles wheelchair tennis title at the 2023 French Open. Schröder was attempting to complete the career Grand Slam.

== Seeds ==
1. (Netherlands) Niels Vink (champion)
2. (Netherlands) Sam Schröder (final)

== Draw ==
Key

- Q = Qualifier
- WC = Wild card
- LL = Lucky loser
- Alt = Alternate
- ITF = ITF entry
- PR = Protected ranking
- SR = Special ranking
- SE = Special exempt
- JE = Junior exempt
- JR = Junior Accelerator Programme entrant
- CO = College Accelerator Programme entrant
- NG = Next Gen Accelerator Program entrant
- w/o = Walkover
- r = Retired
- d = Defaulted

=== Finals ===
Quarterfinals
1	(Netherlands) Niels Vink	6	6
(Canada) Robert Shaw	1	1
WC	(Japan) Koji Sugeno	6	7
(Australia) Heath Davidson	2	5
(United Kingdom) Andy Lapthorne	6	3	2
(United States) David Wagner	3	6	6
(South Africa) Donald Ramphadi	2	6^{6}
2	(Netherlands) Sam Schröder	6	7^{8}

Semifinals
1	(Netherlands) Niels Vink	6	6
WC	(Japan) Koji Sugeno	4	2
(United States) David Wagner	0	0
2	(Netherlands) Sam Schröder	6	6

Final
1	(Netherlands) Niels Vink	3	6	6
2	(Netherlands) Sam Schröder	6	4	4
