= 2022 French Open – Wheelchair men's singles =

Wheelchair men's singles
- 2022 French Open

Final
- Champion: (Japan) Shingo Kunieda
- Runner-up: (Argentina) Gustavo Fernández
- Score: 6–2, 5–7, 7–5

Events
Singles	men	women		boys	girls
Doubles	men	women	mixed	boys	girls
WC Singles	men	women	quad
WC Doubles	men	women	quad
Legends	men	women
- French Open

Shingo Kunieda defeated Gustavo Fernández in the final, 6–2, 5–7, 7–5 to win the men's singles wheelchair tennis title at the 2022 French Open. It was his eighth French Open singles title and his 27th major singles title overall.

Alfie Hewett was the two-time defending champion, but was defeated by Fernández in the semifinals.

== Seeds ==
1. (United Kingdom) Alfie Hewett (semifinals)
2. (Japan) Shingo Kunieda (champion)
3. (Argentina) Gustavo Fernández (final)
4. (United Kingdom) Gordon Reid (quarterfinals)

== Draw ==
Key

- Q = Qualifier
- WC = Wild card
- LL = Lucky loser
- Alt = Alternate
- ITF = ITF entry
- PR = Protected ranking
- SR = Special ranking
- SE = Special exempt
- JE = Junior exempt
- JR = Junior Accelerator Programme entrant
- CO = College Accelerator Programme entrant
- NG = Next Gen Accelerator Program entrant
- w/o = Walkover
- r = Retired
- d = Defaulted

=== Finals ===
First round
(Netherlands) T Egberink	4	6	6
(Spain) D Caverzaschi	6	1	4
(Spain) M de la Puente	6	6
WC	(France) Guilhem Laget	0	0
(Japan) T Oda	6	6
(France) N Peifer	1	3
(Belgium) J Gérard	2	6^{3}
(France) S Houdet	6	7^{7}

Quarterfinals
1	(United Kingdom) A Hewett	6	6
(Netherlands) T Egberink	1	2
3	(Argentina) G Fernández	6	6
(Spain) M de la Puente	4	1
(Japan) T Oda	6	6
4	(United Kingdom) G Reid	1	4
(France) S Houdet	3	2
2	(Japan) S Kunieda	6	6

Semifinals
1	(United Kingdom) A Hewett	1	1
3	(Argentina) G Fernández	6	6
(Japan) T Oda	2	1
2	(Japan) S Kunieda	6	6

Final
3	(Argentina) G Fernández	2	7	5
2	(Japan) S Kunieda	6	5	7
