= 2023 French Open – Wheelchair men's singles =

Wheelchair men's singles
- 2023 French Open

Final
- Champion: (Japan) Tokito Oda
- Runner-up: (United Kingdom) Alfie Hewett
- Score: 6–1, 6–4

Events
Singles	men	women		boys	girls
Doubles	men	women	mixed	boys	girls
WC Singles	men	women	quad	boys	girls
WC Doubles	men	women	quad	boys	girls
- French Open

Tokito Oda defeated Alfie Hewett in the final, 6–1, 6–4 to win the men's singles wheelchair tennis title at the 2023 French Open. It was his first major title. Aged 17 years and 33 days, Oda became the youngest wheelchair singles champion and youngest men's major champion in any discipline.

Shingo Kunieda was the reigning champion, but he retired from professional tennis in January 2023.

== Seeds ==
1. (United Kingdom) Alfie Hewett (final)
2. (Japan) Tokito Oda (champion)
3. (Argentina) Gustavo Fernández (semifinals)
4. (Belgium) Joachim Gérard (quarterfinals)

== Draw ==
Key

- Q = Qualifier
- WC = Wild card
- LL = Lucky loser
- Alt = Alternate
- ITF = ITF entry
- PR = Protected ranking
- SR = Special ranking
- SE = Special exempt
- JE = Junior exempt
- JR = Junior Accelerator Programme entrant
- CO = College Accelerator Programme entrant
- NG = Next Gen Accelerator Program entrant
- w/o = Walkover
- r = Retired
- d = Defaulted

=== Finals ===
First round
1	(United Kingdom) Alfie Hewett	6	7
(Netherlands) Tom Egberink	3	5
(United Kingdom) Gordon Reid	6	6
(Netherlands) Maikel Scheffers	1	1
3	(Argentina) Gustavo Fernández	6	6
(United States) Casey Ratzlaff	0	3
(Japan) Takuya Miki	6	6
WC	(France) Stéphane Houdet	4	2
(Chile) Alexander Cataldo	3	6^{5}
(Spain) Martín de la Puente	6	7^{7}
WC	(France) Frédéric Cattaneo	1	0
4	(Belgium) Joachim Gérard	6	6
(Netherlands) Ruben Spaargaren	7^{7}	7^{7}
(Japan) Takashi Sanada	6^{4}	6^{4}
(Japan) Daisuke Arai	1	4
2	(Japan) Tokito Oda	6	6

Quarterfinals
1	(United Kingdom) A Hewett	6	6
(United Kingdom) G Reid	1	0
3	(Argentina) G Fernández	6	6
(Japan) T Miki	0	4
(Spain) M de la Puente	3	7^{7}	6
4	(Belgium) J Gérard	6	6^{2}	4
(Netherlands) R Spaargaren	2	6	4
2	(Japan) T Oda	6	2	6

Semifinals
1	(United Kingdom) A Hewett	6	6
3	(Argentina) G Fernández	2	2
(Spain) M de la Puente	2	6^{6}
2	(Japan) T Oda	6	7^{8}

Final
1	(United Kingdom) A Hewett	1	4
2	(Japan) T Oda	6	6
