= 2022 French Open – Wheelchair quad singles =

Tennis tournament held in 2022

Wheelchair quad singles
- 2022 French Open

Final
- Champion: (Netherlands) Niels Vink
- Runner-up: (Netherlands) Sam Schröder
- Score: 6–4, 7–6^{(10–8)}

Events
| Singles | men | women | | boys | girls |
| Doubles | men | women | mixed | boys | girls |
| WC Singles | men | women | quad |
| WC Doubles | men | women | quad |
| Legends | men | women |
- French Open

Niels Vink defeated Sam Schröder in the final, 6–4, 7–6^{(10–8)} to win the quad singles wheelchair tennis title at the 2022 French Open. It was his first major singles title.

Dylan Alcott was the three-time reigning champion, but retired from professional wheelchair tennis in January 2022.

== Seeds ==
1. (Netherlands) Niels Vink (champion)
2. (Netherlands) Sam Schröder (final)

== Draw ==
Key

- Q = Qualifier
- WC = Wild card
- LL = Lucky loser
- Alt = Alternate
- ITF = ITF entry
- PR = Protected ranking
- SR = Special ranking
- SE = Special exempt
- JE = Junior exempt
- JR = Junior Accelerator Programme entrant
- CO = College Accelerator Programme entrant
- NG = Next Gen Accelerator Program entrant
- w/o = Walkover
- r = Retired
- d = Defaulted

=== Finals ===
Quarterfinals
1 | (Netherlands) Niels Vink | 6 | 6
(United Kingdom) Andy Lapthorne | 0 | 0
(Japan) Koji Sugeno | 3 | 3
(Australia) Heath Davidson | 6 | 6
WC | (Brazil) Ymanitu Silva | 1 | 6 | 4
(United States) David Wagner | 6 | 3 | 6
(South Africa) Donald Ramphadi | 3 | 5
2 | (Netherlands) Sam Schröder | 6 | 7

Semifinals
1 | (Netherlands) Niels Vink | 6 | 6
(Australia) Heath Davidson | 3 | 1
(United States) David Wagner | 3 | 3
2 | (Netherlands) Sam Schröder | 6 | 6

Final
1 | (Netherlands) Niels Vink | 6 | 7^{10}
2 | (Netherlands) Sam Schröder | 4 | 6^{8}
