= 2023 French Open – Girls' doubles =

Junior Tennis Tournament

Girls' doubles
- 2023 French Open

Final
- Champions: (United States) Tyra Caterina Grant (United States) Clervie Ngounoue
- Runners-up: Alina Korneeva (Japan) Sara Saito
- Score: 6–3, 6–2

Events
Singles	men	women		boys	girls
Doubles	men	women	mixed	boys	girls
WC Singles	men	women	quad
WC Doubles	men	women	quad
- French Open

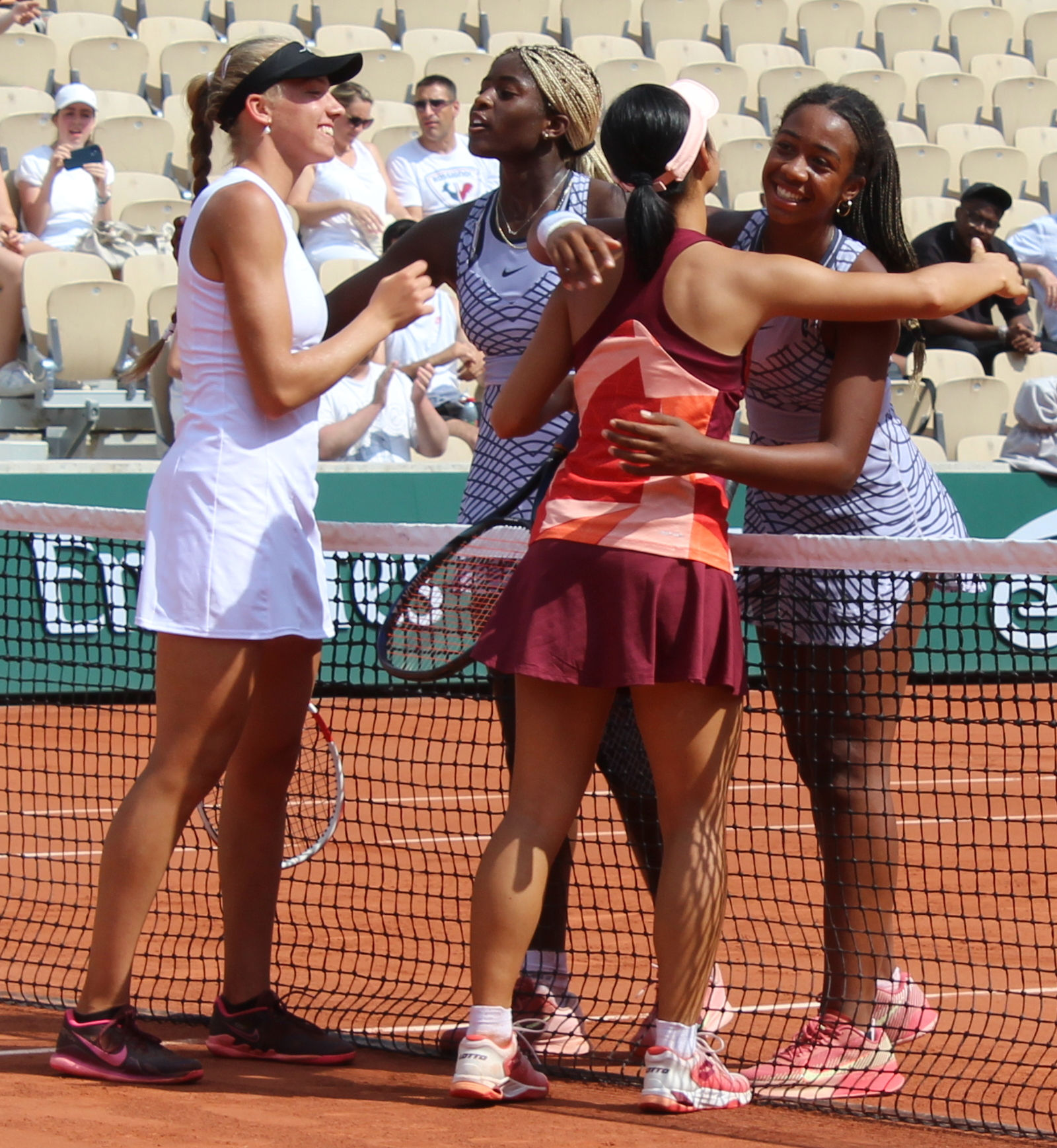
Clervie Ngounoue and Tyra Caterina Grant beat Alina Korneeva and Sara Saito in the final.

Tyra Caterina Grant and Clervie Ngounoue won the girls' doubles title at the 2023 French Open, defeating Alina Korneeva and Sara Saito in the final, 6–3, 6–2.

Sára Bejlek and Lucie Havlíčková were the defending champions, but chose not to participate.

== Seeds ==
1. Alina Korneeva / (Japan) Sara Saito (final)
2. (Japan) Mayu Crossley / (United States) Kaitlin Quevedo (withdrew)
3. (Slovakia) Renáta Jamrichová / (Italy) Federica Urgesi (semifinals)
4. (Japan) Sayaka Ishii / (Japan) Ena Koike (semifinals)
5. (Argentina) Luciana Moyano / (Peru) Lucciana Pérez Alarcón (first round)
6. (United States) Tyra Caterina Grant / (United States) Clervie Ngounoue (champions)
7. (Romania) Mara Gae / (United Kingdom) Ella McDonald (quarterfinals)
8. (Serbia) Teodora Kostović / (Germany) Sonja Zhiyenbayeva (first round)

== Draw ==
Key

- Q = Qualifier
- WC = Wild card
- LL = Lucky loser
- Alt = Alternate
- ITF = ITF entry
- PR = Protected ranking
- SR = Special ranking
- SE = Special exempt
- JE = Junior exempt
- JR = Junior Accelerator Programme entrant
- CO = College Accelerator Programme entrant
- NG = Next Gen Accelerator Program entrant
- w/o = Walkover
- r = Retired
- d = Defaulted

=== Finals ===
Semifinals
1	Alina Korneeva (Japan) Sara Saito	7	6
3	(Slovakia) Renáta Jamrichová (Italy) Federica Urgesi	5	1
4	(Japan) Sayaka Ishii (Japan) Ena Koike	0	4
6	(United States) Tyra Caterina Grant (United States) Clervie Ngounoue	6	6

Final
1	Alina Korneeva (Japan) Sara Saito	3	2
6	(United States) Tyra Caterina Grant (United States) Clervie Ngounoue	6	6

=== Top half ===
First round
1	Alina Korneeva (Japan) Sara Saito	2	6	[10]
(France) Yaroslava Bartashevich; Alevtina Ibragimova	6	3	[8]
(Austria) Tamara Kostic (Japan) Wakana Sonobe	2	7^{7}	[10]
(Spain) Charo Esquiva Banuls (Poland) Zuzanna Pawlikowska	6	6^{3}	[5]
(France) Jenny Lim (Australia) Lily Taylor	6	6
(United States) Alexia Harmon (United States) Valeria Ray	3	4
(United Kingdom) Ranah Stoiber (United Kingdom) Mimi Xu	6	6
8	(Serbia) Teodora Kostović (Germany) Sonja Zhiyenbayeva	1	3
3	(Slovakia) Renáta Jamrichová (Italy) Federica Urgesi	7	6
(Serbia) Darja Šuvirđonkova (Belgium) Amelia Waligora	5	2
(Italy) Francesca Pace (Italy) Alessandra Teodosescu	6	6
WC	(France) Eleejah Inisan (France) Daphnée Mpetshi Perricard	1	1
(Turkey) Melisa Ercan (Hungary) Luca Udvardy	6	6
(Czech Republic) Amélie Šmejkalová (Czech Republic) Tereza Valentová	3	4
(France) Mathilde Ngijol Carré (France) Margot Phanthala	3	2
7	(Romania) Mara Gae (United Kingdom) Ella McDonald	6	6

Second round
1	A Korneeva (Japan) S Saito	6	6
(Austria) T Kostic (Japan) W Sonobe	3	2
(France) J Lim (Australia) L Taylor	2	7	[2]
(United Kingdom) RA Stoiber (United Kingdom) M Xu	6	5	[10]
3	(Slovakia) R Jamrichová (Italy) F Urgesi	7^{7}	3	[11]
(Italy) F Pace (Italy) A Teodosescu	6^{5}	6	[9]
(Turkey) M Ercan (Hungary) L Udvardy	6^{4}	6	[6]
7	(Romania) M Gae (United Kingdom) E McDonald	7^{7}	2	[10]

Quarterfinals
1	A Korneeva (Japan) S Saito	6^{2}	7	[10]
(United Kingdom) RA Stoiber (United Kingdom) M Xu	7^{7}	5	[8]
3	(Slovakia) R Jamrichová (Italy) F Urgesi	6	6
7	(Romania) M Gae (United Kingdom) E McDonald	3	2

Semifinals
1	A Korneeva (Japan) S Saito	7	6
3	(Slovakia) R Jamrichová (Italy) F Urgesi	5	1

=== Bottom half ===
First round
5	(Argentina) Luciana Moyano (Peru) Lucciana Pérez Alarcón	6	1	[7]
Anastasiia Gureva (Japan) Hayu Kinoshita	1	6	[10]
WC	(France) Lucie Pawlak (France) Tiantsoa Sarah Rakotomanga Rajaonah	6^{3}	6	[8]
(Bulgaria) Rosita Dencheva; Alisa Oktiabreva	7^{7}	3	[10]
Alt	(United States) Ashton Bowers (Australia) Maya Joint	2	2
(Morocco) Malak El Allami (Morocco) Aya El Aouni	6	6
(United States) Ariana Anazagasty-Pursoo (United States) Tatum Evans	2	4
4	(Japan) Sayaka Ishii (Japan) Ena Koike	6	6
6	(United States) Tyra Caterina Grant (United States) Clervie Ngounoue	6	6
Vlada Mincheva (United States) Anya Murthy	2	0
(Bulgaria) Iva Ivanova (Romania) Cara Maria Meșter	6	6
WC	(France) Sarah Iliev (France) Astrid Lew Yan Foon	3	3
(Czech Republic) Alena Kovačková (Czech Republic) Laura Samsonová	6	6
(Denmark) Rebecca Munk Mortensen (United States) Mia Slama	2	1
(Australia) Emerson Jones (United Kingdom) Hannah Klugman	w/o
2	(Japan) Mayu Crossley (United States) Kaitlin Quevedo

Second round
A Gureva (Japan) H Kinoshita	6	6
(Bulgaria) R Dencheva; A Oktiabreva	0	0
(Morocco) M El Allami (Morocco) A El Aouni	4	1
4	(Japan) S Ishii (Japan) E Koike	6	6
6	(United States) TC Grant (United States) C Ngounoue	6	6
(Bulgaria) I Ivanova (Romania) CM Meșter	2	3
(Czech Republic) A Kovačková (Czech Republic) L Samsonová	7	4	[10]
(Australia) E Jones (United Kingdom) H Klugman	5	6	[3]

Quarterfinals
A Gureva (Japan) H Kinoshita	4	7^{7}	[4]
4	(Japan) S Ishii (Japan) E Koike	6	6^{3}	[10]
6	(United States) TC Grant (United States) C Ngounoue	6	3	[10]
(Czech Republic) A Kovačková (Czech Republic) L Samsonová	0	6	[8]

Semifinals
4	(Japan) S Ishii (Japan) E Koike	0	4
6	(United States) TC Grant (United States) C Ngounoue	6	6
