= Robert Shaw (wheelchair tennis) =

Canadian wheelchair tennis player

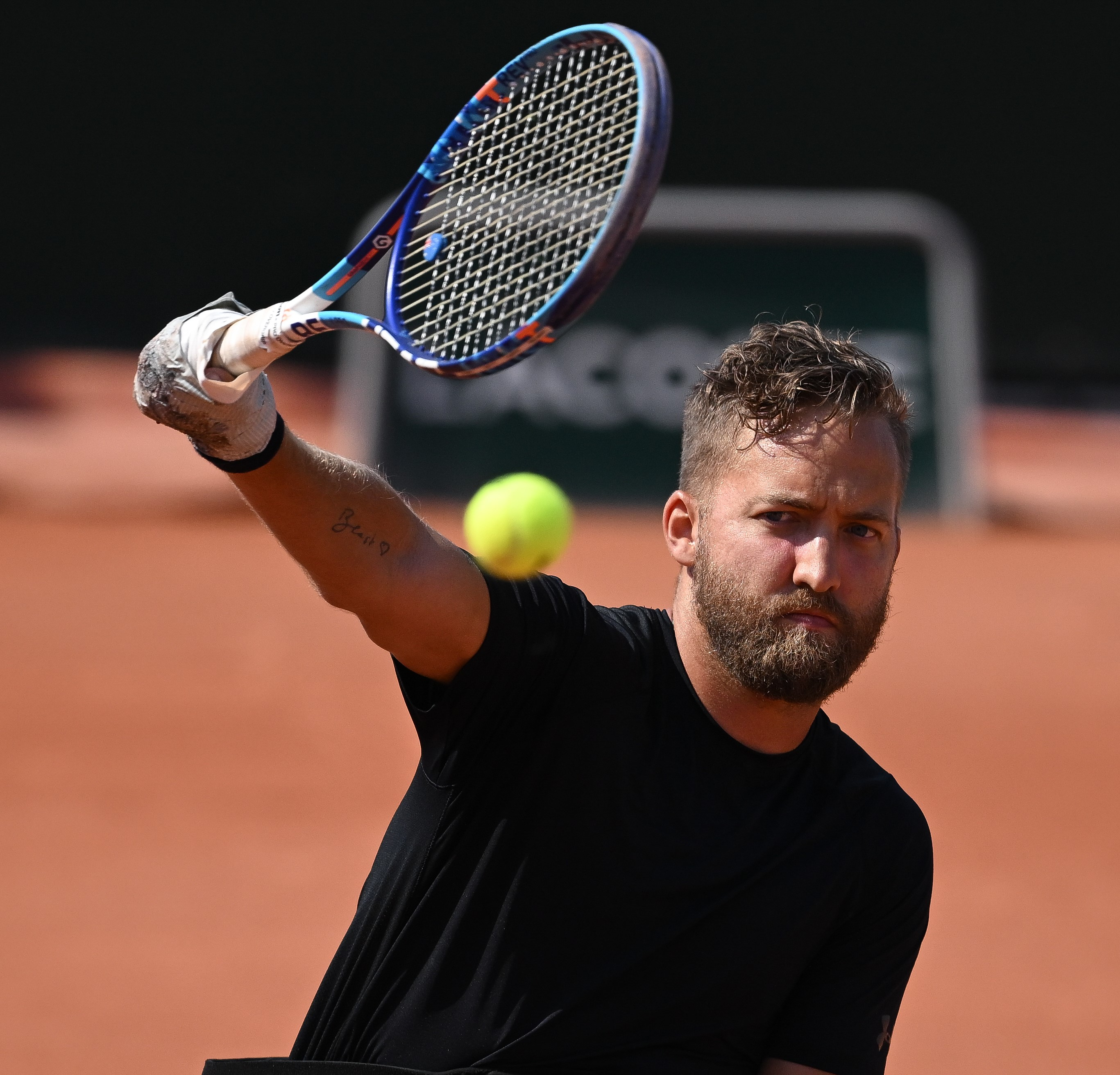
- 2023 Roland Garros
- Country (sports): Canada
- Residence: Kelowna, British Columbia, Canada
- Born: December 6, 1989 (age 36) North Bay, Ontario, Canada
- Height: 5 ft 9 in (175 cm)
- Plays: Right-handed (one-handed backhand)

Singles
- Career record: 179-99
- Career titles: 25
- Highest ranking: No. 6 (13 March 2023)
- Current ranking: No. 12 (24 Dec 2025)

Grand Slam singles results
- Australian Open: QF (2023, 2024)
- French Open: QF (2023, 2024)
- Wimbledon: QF (2023)
- US Open: QF (2022, 2025)

Doubles
- Career record: 139-84
- Career titles: 29
- Highest ranking: No. 3 (12 June 2023)
- Current ranking: No. 10 (24 Dec 2025)

Grand Slam doubles results
- Australian Open: SF (2023, 2024, 2025, 2026)
- French Open: F (2023)
- Wimbledon: F (2023)
- US Open: F (2022)
Medal record
Parapan American Games
Gold medal – first place	2019 Lima	Quads' singles
Silver medal – second place	2023 Santiago	Quads' singles
- Last updated on: 24 June 2022.

Robert Shaw (born December 6, 1989) is a Canadian wheelchair tennis player who competes in international level events, he plays in the quads' division. He is a Parapan American Games champion in the quads' singles at the 2019 Parapan American Games in Lima. He was partially paralysed from the neck down after a freak diving accident aged 21.

Shaw qualified to represent Canada at the 2020 Summer Paralympics.

Shaw won the silver medal at the 2023 Parapan American Games in Santiago in quads' singles.
