= Macarena Cabrillana =

Chilean wheelchair tennis player

- Full name: Macarena Andrea Cabrillana Sanhueza
- Country (sports): Chile
- Born: 31 March 1992 (age 33); Recoleta, Chile
- Turned pro: 2011
- Plays: Right-handed (one-handed backhand)

Singles
- Career record: 220–155
- Career titles: 19
- Highest ranking: No. 9 (13 September 2021)
- Current ranking: No. 11 (5 September 2022)

Grand Slam singles results
- Australian Open: QF (2021)
- French Open: 1R (2022, 2023)
- US Open: 1R (2022)

Other tournaments
- Paralympic Games: 2R (2016, 2024)

Doubles
- Career record: 122–126
- Career titles: 19
- Highest ranking: No. 8 (6 June 2022)
- Current ranking: No. 9 (5 September 2022)

Grand Slam doubles results
- Australian Open: SF (2021)
- French Open: SF (2022)
- US Open: QF (2022)
Medal record
Parapan American Games
Representing Chile
Silver medal – second place	2019 Lima	Singles
Bronze medal – third place	2023 Santiago	Singles

Macarena Andrea "Maca" Cabrillana Sanhueza (born 31 March 1992) is a Chilean wheelchair tennis player. She was the first Chilean wheelchair tennis player to compete in a Grand Slam when she competed at the 2021 Australian Open, she was a quarterfinalist in the singles event and a semifinalist in the doubles event. She has also a silver medal in the women's singles at the 2019 Parapan American Games.

== Mental health struggle ==
When Cabrillana was 16, she jumped from the fifth floor of a building as a suicide attempt, she had L3 lumbar paraplegia following her fall and spent a month in hospital. She has spoken openly about living with depression.

Cabrillana was inspired to play tennis by watching Rafael Nadal and Nicolás Massú while growing up and during rehabilitation. She chose to take part in the tennis workshop with Chilean tennis player Hans Gildemeister's sister Doris who trained her once a week and Cabrillana enjoyed her sessions very much.
