= Dana Mathewson =

American wheelchair tennis player (born 1990)

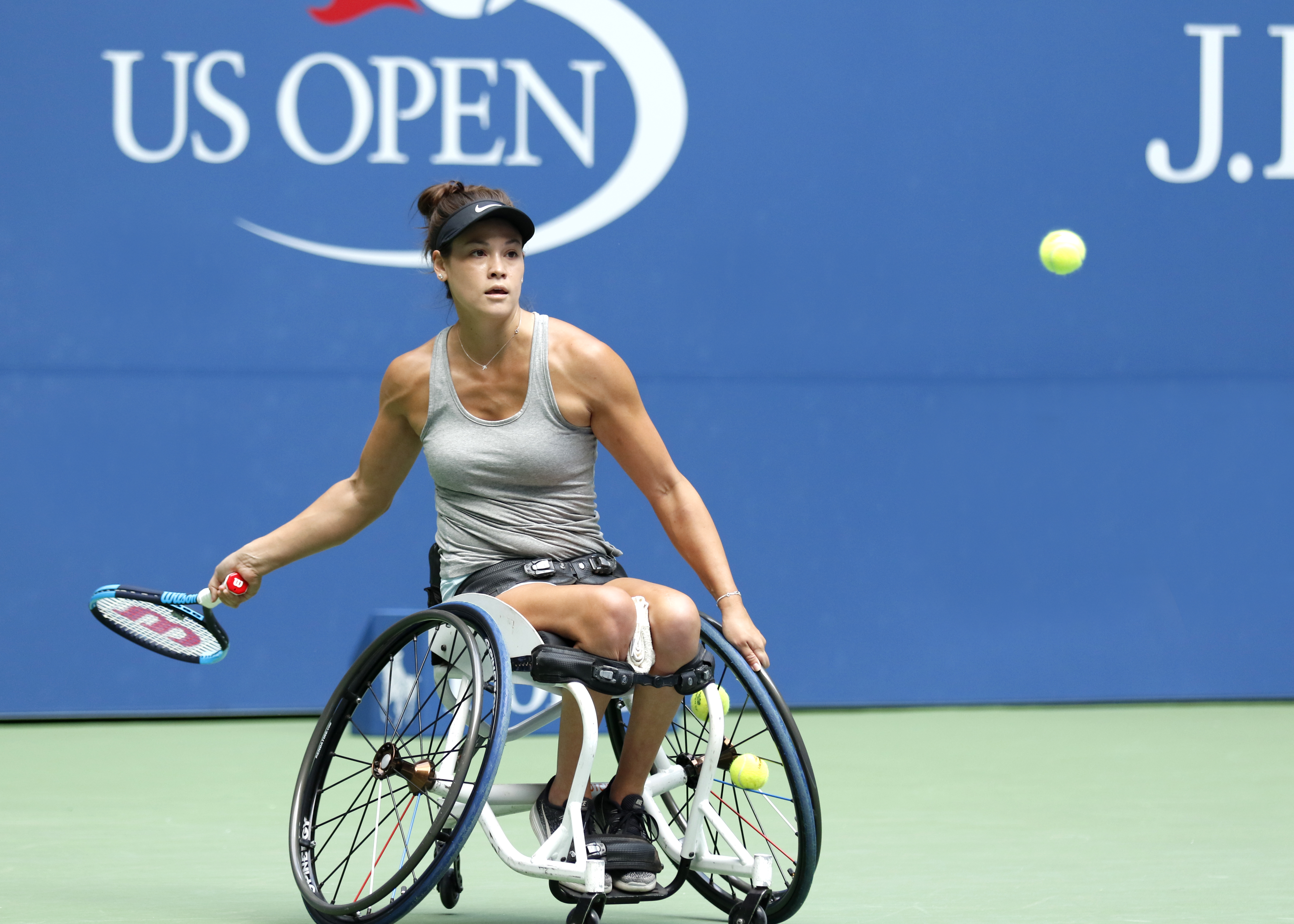
- Mathewson at 2017 US Open
- Country (sports): United States
- Residence: Tucson, Arizona, U.S.
- Born: December 19, 1990 (age 35) San Diego, California, U.S.
- Turned pro: 2006
- Retired: 2024
- Plays: Right-handed (one-handed backhand)

Singles
- Career record: 252–172
- Career titles: 5
- Highest ranking: No. 7 (10 January 2022)
- Current ranking: No. 8 (September 2023)

Grand Slam singles results
- Australian Open: QF (2022, 2023, 2024)
- French Open: QF (2021, 2022, 2023, 2024)
- Wimbledon: QF (2022)
- US Open: SF (2019)

Other tournaments
- Paralympic Games: QF (2020)

Doubles
- Career record: 208–148
- Career titles: 17
- Highest ranking: No. 4 (9 September 2019)
- Current ranking: No. 9 (4 September 2023)

Grand Slam doubles results
- Australian Open: SF (2022, 2023, 2024)
- French Open: SF (2021, 2024)
- Wimbledon: W (2022)
- US Open: F (2017)

Other doubles tournaments
- Paralympic Games: QF (2016)
Medal record
Parapan American Games
Gold medal – first place	2019 Lima	Doubles
Gold medal – first place	2023 Santiago	Singles
Gold medal – first place	2023 Santiago	Doubles
Bronze medal – third place	2019 Lima	Singles

Dana Mathewson (born December 19, 1990) is an American former professional wheelchair tennis player. Mathewson won a Grand Slam tournament title in doubles (with Japanese doubles partner Yui Kamiji) at the 2022 Wimbledon Championships which made her the first American woman to win a Major wheelchair tennis title. She retired from professional wheelchair tennis in November 2024.
