= Emmanuelle Mörch =

French wheelchair tennis player

- Country (sports): France
- Residence: Paris, France
- Born: 4 July 1990 (age 36) Les Ulis, France
- Plays: Right-handed (one-handed backhand)

Singles
- Career titles: 8
- Highest ranking: No. 24 (13 March 2017)
- Current ranking: No. 30 (7 June 2021)

Grand Slam singles results
- French Open: QF (2021)

Other tournaments
- Paralympic Games: 1R (2016)

Doubles
- Career titles: 18
- Highest ranking: No. 11 (9 November 2015)
- Current ranking: No. 31 (7 June 2021)

Grand Slam doubles results
- French Open: SF (2021, 2022, 2023)

Other doubles tournaments
- Paralympic Games: 1R (2016)

Emmanuelle Mörch (born 4 July 1990) is a French wheelchair tennis player who was a quarterfinalist at the 2021 French Open and competed at the 2016 Summer Paralympics.

Mörch became a paraplegic after a snowboarding accident in 2008.

Mörch is a class of 2015 an engineering degree from the École Centrale Paris.
