= Cooper Williams =

American tennis player

- Country (sports): United States
- Residence: Boca Raton, Florida, US
- Born: June 17, 2005 (age 21) New York City, US
- Height: 6 ft 3 in (1.91 m)
- Plays: Right-handed (two-handed backhand)
- Prize money: US $57,406

Singles
- Career record: 0–0 (at ATP Tour level, Grand Slam level, and in Davis Cup)
- Career titles: 0
- Highest ranking: No. 562 (June 15, 2026)
- Current ranking: No. 814 (August 31, 2026)

Doubles
- Career record: 1–1 (at ATP Tour level, Grand Slam level, and in Davis Cup)
- Career titles: 0
- Highest ranking: No. 473 (September 8, 2025)
- Current ranking: No. 584 (August 31, 2026)

Grand Slam doubles results
- US Open: 2R (2025)
- Last updated on: September 1, 2026.

Cooper Williams (born June 17, 2005) is an American professional tennis player. He has a career-high ATP singles ranking of No. 562 achieved on June 15, 2026 and a highest doubles ranking of No. 473 achieved on September 8, 2025.

Williams won the boys' doubles title at the 2023 Australian Open, with countryman Learner Tien.

== Early life ==
Born and raised in New York City, Williams attended St. Bernard's School on the Upper East Side from Kindergarten to seventh grade. He graduated from Dwight School Global in June 2023. Williams relocated to Boca Raton, Florida during the Covid pandemic, where he works with fitness coach, Richard Woodruff.

== Junior career ==
Alongside partner Learner Tien, Williams won the junior Australian Open doubles in January 2023, defeating Alexander Blockx and João Fonseca in the final 6–4, 6–4.

He reached an ITF junior combined ranking of world No. 3 on August 28, 2023.

== Professional career ==
In August 2025, he made his main draw grand slam debut alongside Theodore Winegar at the 2025 US Open, having received the US collegiate wildcard into the men's doubles having won the inaugural American Collegiate Wildcard Playoff in Orlando. In the first round they defeated Czech pairing Petr Nouza and Patrik Rikl in straight sets before facing previous finalists and the No. 4 seeds Kevin Krawietz and Tim Puetz.

== College ==
Williams played his Freshman season of college tennis at Harvard, where he earned All-America singles status and 2024 NCAA Rookie of the Year. He led the Crimson to its highest NCAA ranking in program history, #6 in the nation. Williams now plays for Duke University.

== ITF World Tennis Tour finals ==
=== Singles: 3 (3 titles) ===
Legend ITF WTT (3–0)

Result	W–L	Date	Tournament	Tier	Surface	Opponent	Score
Win	1–0	Jun 2025	M15 Monastir, Tunisia	WTT	Hard	(United Kingdom) Marcus Walters	6–3, 6–1
Win	2–0	Jun 2025	M15 Monastir, Tunisia	WTT	Hard	(Italy) Luca Potenza	6–3, 7–5
Win	3–0	May 2026	M15 Gaborone, Botswana	WTT	Hard	(France) Constantin Bittoun Kouzmine	6–2, 6–2

=== Doubles: 6 (4 titles, 2 runner-ups) ===
Legend ITF WTT (4–2)	Finals by surface Hard (4–2) Clay (–)

Result	W–L	Date	Tournament	Tier	Surface	Partner	Opponents	Score
Loss	0–1	Jul 2022	M25 Edwardsville, US	WTT	Hard	(United States) Kweisi Kenyatte	(Japan) Makoto Ochi (Japan) Seita Watanabe	6–7^{(1–7)}, 3–6
Loss	0–2	Aug 2022	M15 Memphis, US	WTT	Hard	(United States) Alex Michelsen	(United Kingdom) Millen Hurrion (New Zealand) Finn Reynolds	0–6, 1–6
Win	1–2	Sep 2022	M15 Fayetteville, US	WTT	Hard	(Belgium) Alessio Basile	(Switzerland) Adrien Burdet (France) Melvin Manuel	6–4, 6–3
Win	2–2	Mar 2023	M25 Calabasas, US	WTT	Hard	(Australia) Edward Winter	(United States) Rohan Murali (United States) Elijah Strode	6–2, 6–3
Win	3–2	Oct 2024	M15 Winston-Salem, US	WTT	Hard	(United States) Daniel Milavsky	(United States) Ryan Fishback (United States) Henry Lieberman	6–1, 6–1
Win	4–2	Jul 2025	M15 Monastir, Tunisia	WTT	Hard	(United Kingdom) Matthew Rankin	Daniil Bogatov; Evgenii Tiurnev	6–3, 5–7, [10–5]

== Junior Grand Slam finals ==
=== Doubles: 1 (title) ===
Result	Year	Tournament	Surface	Partner	Opponents	Score
Win	2023	Australian Open	Hard	(United States) Learner Tien	(Belgium) Alexander Blockx (Brazil) João Fonseca	6–4, 6–4
