= List of women's wheelchair tennis champions =

This is a list of the wheelchair tennis champions at the Grand Slam and the Wheelchair Tennis Masters events in the women's division since the introduction of the NEC Tour in 1992. Champions from the wheelchair tennis events at the Paralympic Games are also included.

== Champions by year ==
Legend
bold outline	Player won the Grand Slam (four major tournaments in the same year).

=== Wheelchair women's singles ===
Year	Grand Slam tournaments				Masters	Paralympics
Year	Australian Open	French Open	Wimbledon	US Open	Masters	Paralympics
1992	not held	not held	not held	not held	not held	Monique Kalkman
1994	not held	not held	not held	not held	Monique Kalkman	not held
1995	not held	not held	not held	not held	Monique Kalkman	not held
1996	not held	not held	not held	not held	Chantal Vandierendonck	Maaike Smit
1997	not held	not held	not held	not held	Maaike Smit	not held
1998	not held	not held	not held	not held	Esther Vergeer	not held
1999	not held	not held	not held	not held	Esther Vergeer	not held
2000	not held	not held	not held	not held	Esther Vergeer	Esther Vergeer
2001	not held	not held	not held	not held	Esther Vergeer	not held
2002	Esther Vergeer	not held	not held	not held	Esther Vergeer	not held
2003	Esther Vergeer	not held	not held	not held	Esther Vergeer	not held
2004	Esther Vergeer	not held	not held	not held	Esther Vergeer	Esther Vergeer
2005	Mie Yaosa	not held	not held	Esther Vergeer	Esther Vergeer	not held
2006	Esther Vergeer	not held	not held	Esther Vergeer	Esther Vergeer	not held
2007	Esther Vergeer	Esther Vergeer	not held	Esther Vergeer	Esther Vergeer	not held
2008	Esther Vergeer	Esther Vergeer	not held	not held	Esther Vergeer	Esther Vergeer
2009	Esther Vergeer	Esther Vergeer	not held	Esther Vergeer	Esther Vergeer	not held
2010	Korie Homan	Esther Vergeer	not held	Esther Vergeer	Esther Vergeer	not held
2011	Esther Vergeer	Esther Vergeer	not held	Esther Vergeer	Esther Vergeer	not held
2012	Esther Vergeer	Esther Vergeer	not held	not held	Jiske Griffioen	Esther Vergeer
2013	Aniek van Koot	Sabine Ellerbrock	not held	Aniek van Koot	Yui Kamiji	not held
2014	Sabine Ellerbrock	Yui Kamiji	not held	Yui Kamiji	Aniek van Koot	not held
2015	Jiske Griffioen	Jiske Griffioen	not held	Jordanne Whiley	Jiske Griffioen	not held
2016	Jiske Griffioen	Marjolein Buis	Jiske Griffioen	not held	Jiske Griffioen	Jiske Griffioen
2017	Yui Kamiji	Yui Kamiji	Diede de Groot	Yui Kamiji	Diede de Groot	not held
2018	Diede de Groot	Yui Kamiji	Diede de Groot	Diede de Groot	Diede de Groot	not held
2019	Diede de Groot	Diede de Groot	Aniek van Koot	Diede de Groot	Diede de Groot	not held
2020	Yui Kamiji	Yui Kamiji	cancelled	Diede de Groot	cancelled	Rescheduled
2021	Diede de Groot	Diede de Groot	Diede de Groot	Diede de Groot	Diede de Groot	Diede de Groot
2022	Diede de Groot	Diede de Groot	Diede de Groot	Diede de Groot	Diede de Groot	not held
2023	Diede de Groot	Diede de Groot	Diede de Groot	Diede de Groot	Diede de Groot	not held
2024	Diede de Groot	Diede de Groot	Diede de Groot	not held	Yui Kamiji	Yui Kamiji
2025	Yui Kamiji	Yui Kamiji	Wang Ziying	Yui Kamiji	Yui Kamiji	not held
2026	Li Xiaohui	Diede de Groot	Yui Kamiji	Yui Kamiji		not held

=== Wheelchair women's doubles ===
Year	Grand Slam tournaments				Masters	Paralympics
Year	Australian Open	French Open	Wimbledon	US Open	Masters	Paralympics
1992	not held	not held	not held	not held	not held	Monique Kalkman; Chantal Vandierendonck
1996	not held	not held	not held	not held	not held	Monique Kalkman; Chantal Vandierendonck
2000	not held	not held	not held	not held	Daniela Di Toro; Maaike Smit	Maaike Smit; Esther Vergeer
2001	not held	not held	not held	not held	Maaike Smit; Esther Vergeer	not held
2002	not held	not held	not held	not held	Maaike Smit; Esther Vergeer	not held
2003	not held	not held	not held	not held	Maaike Smit; Esther Vergeer	not held
2004	Maaike Smit; Esther Vergeer	not held	not held	not held	Jiske Griffioen; Esther Vergeer	Maaike Smit; Esther Vergeer
2005	Florence Gravellier; Maaike Smit	not held	not held	Korie Homan; Esther Vergeer	Jiske Griffioen; Esther Vergeer	not held
2006	Jiske Griffioen; Esther Vergeer	not held	not held	Jiske Griffioen; Esther Vergeer	Jiske Griffioen; Esther Vergeer	not held
2007	Jiske Griffioen; Esther Vergeer	Maaike Smit; Esther Vergeer	not held	Jiske Griffioen; Esther Vergeer	Jiske Griffioen; Esther Vergeer	not held
2008	Jiske Griffioen; Esther Vergeer	Jiske Griffioen; Esther Vergeer	not held	not held	Jiske Griffioen; Esther Vergeer	Korie Homan; Sharon Walraven
2009	Korie Homan; Esther Vergeer	Korie Homan; Esther Vergeer	Korie Homan; Esther Vergeer	Korie Homan; Esther Vergeer	Korie Homan; Esther Vergeer	not held
2010	Florence Gravellier; Aniek van Koot	Daniela Di Toro; Aniek van Koot	Esther Vergeer; Sharon Walraven	Esther Vergeer; Sharon Walraven	Aniek van Koot; Sharon Walraven	not held
2011	Esther Vergeer; Sharon Walraven	Esther Vergeer; Sharon Walraven	Esther Vergeer; Sharon Walraven	Esther Vergeer; Sharon Walraven	Esther Vergeer; Sharon Walraven	not held
2012	Esther Vergeer; Sharon Walraven	Marjolein Buis; Esther Vergeer	Jiske Griffioen; Aniek van Koot	not held	Jiske Griffioen; Aniek van Koot	Marjolein Buis; Esther Vergeer
2013	Jiske Griffioen; Aniek van Koot	Jiske Griffioen; Aniek van Koot	Jiske Griffioen; Aniek van Koot	Jiske Griffioen; Aniek van Koot	Yui Kamiji; Jordanne Whiley	not held
2014	Yui Kamiji; Jordanne Whiley	Yui Kamiji; Jordanne Whiley	Yui Kamiji; Jordanne Whiley	Yui Kamiji; Jordanne Whiley	Yui Kamiji; Jordanne Whiley	not held
2015	Yui Kamiji; Jordanne Whiley	Jiske Griffioen; Aniek van Koot	Yui Kamiji; Jordanne Whiley	Jiske Griffioen; Aniek van Koot	Jiske Griffioen; Aniek van Koot	not held
2016	Marjolein Buis; Yui Kamiji	Yui Kamiji; Jordanne Whiley	Yui Kamiji; Jordanne Whiley	not held	Diede de Groot; Lucy Shuker	Jiske Griffioen; Aniek van Koot
2017	Jiske Griffioen; Aniek van Koot	Marjolein Buis; Yui Kamiji	Yui Kamiji; Jordanne Whiley	Marjolein Buis; Diede de Groot	Marjolein Buis; Diede de Groot	not held
2018	Marjolein Buis; Yui Kamiji	Diede de Groot; Aniek van Koot	Diede de Groot; Yui Kamiji	Diede de Groot; Yui Kamiji	Marjolein Buis; Aniek van Koot	not held
2019	Diede de Groot; Aniek van Koot	Diede de Groot; Aniek van Koot	Diede de Groot; Aniek van Koot	Diede de Groot; Aniek van Koot	Diede de Groot; Aniek van Koot	not held
2020	Yui Kamiji; Jordanne Whiley	Diede de Groot; Aniek van Koot	cancelled	Yui Kamiji; Jordanne Whiley	cancelled	Rescheduled
2021	Diede de Groot; Aniek van Koot	Diede de Groot; Aniek van Koot	Yui Kamiji; Jordanne Whiley	Diede de Groot; Aniek van Koot	Diede de Groot; Aniek van Koot	Diede de Groot; Aniek van Koot
2022	Diede de Groot; Aniek van Koot	Diede de Groot; Aniek van Koot	Yui Kamiji; Dana Mathewson	Diede de Groot; Aniek van Koot	Diede de Groot; Aniek van Koot	not held
2023	Diede de Groot; Aniek van Koot	Yui Kamiji; Kgothatso Montjane	Diede de Groot; Jiske Griffioen	Yui Kamiji; Kgothatso Montjane	Yui Kamiji; Kgothatso Montjane	not held
2024	Jiske Griffioen; Diede de Groot	Diede de Groot; Aniek van Koot	Yui Kamiji; Kgothatso Montjane	not held	Jiske Griffioen; Aniek van Koot	Yui Kamiji; Manami Tanaka
2025	Li Xiaohui; Wang Ziying	Yui Kamiji; Kgothatso Montjane	Li Xiaohui; Wang Ziying	Li Xiaohui; Wang Ziying	Yui Kamiji; Zhu Zhenzhen	not held
2026	Li Xiaohui; Wang Ziying	Yui Kamiji; Zhu Zhenzhen	Yui Kamiji; Zhu Zhenzhen	Yui Kamiji; Zhu Zhenzhen		not held

=== Wheelchair girls' singles ===
Year	Australian Open	French Open	Wimbledon	US Open
2022	not held	not held	not held	Jade Lanai
2023	not held	not held	not held	Ksénia Chasteau
2024	not held	Ksénia Chasteau	not held	Yuma Takamuro
2025	Vitória Miranda	Vitória Miranda	not held	Sabina Czauz
2026	Luna Gryp	Luna Gryp	not held	Seira Matsuoka

=== Wheelchair girls' doubles ===
Year	Australian Open	French Open	Wimbledon	US Open
2022	not held	not held	not held	Jade Lanai; Maylee Phelps
2023	not held	not held	not held	Ksénia Chasteau; Maylee Phelps
2024	not held	Ksénia Chasteau; Maylee Phelps	not held	Rio Okano; Yuma Takamuro
2025	Luna Gryp; Vitória Miranda	Luna Gryp; Vitória Miranda	not held	Sabina Czauz; Seira Matsuoka
2026	Lucy Foyster; Seira Matsuoka	Luna Gryp; Seira Matsuoka	not held	Paula Michelle López Meza; Seira Matsuoka

== Champions list ==
=== Wheelchair women's singles ===
Rank	Player	Grand Slam tournaments					Masters	Paralympics	Total
Rank	Player	Australian Open	French Open	Wimbledon	US Open	Total	Masters	Paralympics	Total
1	Esther Vergeer	9	6	0	6	21	14	4	39
2	Diede de Groot	6	6	6	6	24	6	1	31
3	Yui Kamiji	3	5	1	4	13	3	1	17
4	Jiske Griffioen	2	1	1	0	4	3	1	8
5	Aniek van Koot	1	0	1	1	3	1	0	4
6	Monique Kalkman	0	0	0	0	0	2	1	3
7	Maaike Smit	0	0	0	0	0	1	1	2
7	Sabine Ellerbrock	1	1	0	0	2	0	0	2
9	Chantal Vandierendonck	0	0	0	0	0	1	0	1
9	Mie Yaosa	1	0	0	0	1	0	0	1
9	Korie Homan	1	0	0	0	1	0	0	1
9	Jordanne Whiley	0	0	0	1	1	0	0	1
9	Marjolein Buis	0	1	0	0	1	0	0	1
9	Wang Ziying	0	0	1	0	1	0	0	1
9	Li Xiaohui	1	0	0	0	1	0	0	1

=== Wheelchair women's doubles ===
Rank	Player	Grand Slam tournaments					Masters	Paralympics	Total
Rank	Player	Australian Open	French Open	Wimbledon	US Open	Total	Masters	Paralympics	Total
1	Esther Vergeer	7	5	3	6	21	10	3	34
1	Aniek van Koot	7	9	3	5	24	8	2	34
3	Yui Kamiji	5	6	9	5	25	4	1	30
4	Diede de Groot	5	6	3	5	19	5	1	25
4	Jiske Griffioen	6	3	3	4	16	8	1	25
6	Jordanne Whiley	3	2	5	2	12	2	0	14
7	Sharon Walraven	2	1	2	2	7	2	1	10
8	Maaike Smit	2	1	0	0	3	4	2	9
9	Marjolein Buis	2	2	0	1	5	2	1	8
10	Korie Homan	1	1	1	2	5	1	1	7
11	Kgothatso Montjane	0	2	1	1	4	1	0	5
12	Li Xiaohui	2	0	1	1	4	0	0	4
12	Wang Ziying	2	0	1	1	4	0	0	4
12	Zhu Zhenzhen	0	1	1	1	3	0	1	4
15	Monique Kalkman	0	0	0	0	0	0	2	2
15	Chantal Vandierendonck	0	0	0	0	0	0	2	2
15	Florence Gravellier	2	0	0	0	2	0	0	2
15	Daniela Di Toro	0	1	0	0	1	1	0	2
19	Lucy Shuker	0	0	0	0	0	1	0	1
19	Dana Mathewson	0	0	1	0	1	0	0	1
19	Manami Tanaka	0	0	0	0	0	0	1	1

=== Wheelchair girls' singles ===
Rank	Player	Australian Open	French Open	Wimbledon	US Open	Total
1	Ksénia Chasteau	0	1	0	1	2
1	Vitória Miranda	1	1	0	0	2
1	Luna Gryp	1	1	0	0	2
4	Jade Lanai	0	0	0	1	1
4	Yuma Takamuro	0	0	0	1	1
4	Sabina Czauz	0	0	0	1	1
4	Seira Matsuoka	0	0	0	1	1

=== Wheelchair girls' doubles ===
Rank	Player	Australian Open	French Open	Wimbledon	US Open	Total
1	Seira Matsuoka	1	1	0	2	4
2	Maylee Phelps	0	1	0	2	3
2	Luna Gryp	1	2	0	0	3
4	Ksénia Chasteau	0	1	0	1	2
4	Vitória Miranda	1	1	0	0	2
6	Jade Lanai	0	0	0	1	1
6	Rio Okano	0	0	0	1	1
6	Yuma Takamuro	0	0	0	1	1
6	Sabina Czauz	0	0	0	1	1
6	Lucy Foyster	0	0	0	1	1

== Grand Slam titles by decade ==
=== Wheelchair women's singles ===
as of 2026 French Open.

2000s

14	Esther Vergeer

1	Mie Yaosa

2010s

7	Esther Vergeer

7	Diede de Groot

6	Yui Kamiji

4	Jiske Griffioen

3	Aniek van Koot

2	Sabine Ellerbrock

1	Korie Homan

1	Jordanne Whiley

1	Marjolein Buis

2020s

17	Diede de Groot

8	Yui Kamiji

1	Wang Ziying

1	Li Xiaohui

=== Wheelchair women's doubles ===
as of 2024 Wimbledon.

2000s Individual

13	Esther Vergeer

6	Jiske Griffioen

5	Korie Homan

3	Maaike Smit

1	Florence Gravellier

2010s Individual

15	Aniek van Koot

14	Yui Kamiji

9	Jordanne Whiley

8	Esther Vergeer

8	Diede de Groot

8	Jiske Griffioen

7	Sharon Walraven

5	Marjolein Buis

1	Florence Gravellier

1	Daniela Di Toro

2020s Individual

11	Diede de Groot

9	Aniek van Koot

7	Yui Kamiji

3	Jordanne Whiley

3	Kgothatso Montjane

2	Jiske Griffioen

1	Dana Mathewson

2000s Team

6	Jiske Griffioen & Esther Vergeer

5	Korie Homan & Esther Vergeer

2	Maaike Smit & Esther Vergeer

1	Florence Gravellier & Maaike Smit

2010s Team

9	Yui Kamiji & Jordanne Whiley

8	Jiske Griffioen & Aniek van Koot

7	Esther Vergeer & Sharon Walraven

5	Diede de Groot & Aniek van Koot

3	Marjolein Buis & Yui Kamiji

2	Diede de Groot & Yui Kamiji

1	Florence Gravellier & Aniek van Koot

1	Daniela Di Toro & Aniek van Koot

1	Marjolein Buis & Esther Vergeer

1	Marjolein Buis & Diede de Groot

2020s Team

9	Diede de Groot & Aniek van Koot

3	Yui Kamiji & Jordanne Whiley

3	Yui Kamiji & Kgothatso Montjane

2	Jiske Griffioen & Diede de Groot

1	Yui Kamiji & Dana Mathewson

== Grand Slam achievements ==
=== Grand Slam ===
Players who held all four Grand Slam titles simultaneously (in a calendar year).

==== Wheelchair women's singles ====
Player	Australian Open	French Open	Wimbledon	US Open
Diede de Groot	2021	2021	2021	2021
Diede de Groot (2)	2022	2022	2022	2022
Diede de Groot (3)	2023	2023	2023	2023

==== Wheelchair women's doubles ====
Player	Australian Open	French Open	Wimbledon	US Open
Esther Vergeer	2009	2009	2009	2009
Korie Homan	2009	2009	2009	2009
Esther Vergeer (2)	2011	2011	2011	2011
Sharon Walraven	2011	2011	2011	2011
Aniek van Koot	2013	2013	2013	2013
Jiske Griffioen	2013	2013	2013	2013
Yui Kamiji	2014	2014	2014	2014
Jordanne Whiley	2014	2014	2014	2014
Aniek van Koot (2)	2019	2019	2019	2019
Diede de Groot	2019	2019	2019	2019

=== Non-calendar year Grand Slam ===
Players who held all four Grand Slam titles simultaneously (not in a calendar year).

==== Wheelchair women's singles ====
Player	From	To	Streak	Notes
Diede de Groot	2018 Wimbledon	2019 French Open	4	

=== Career Grand Slam ===
Players who won all four Grand Slam titles over the course of their careers.

- The event at which the Career Grand Slam was completed indicated in **bold**

==== Wheelchair women's singles ====
Player	Australian Open	French Open	Wimbledon	US Open
Diede de Groot	2018	**2019**	2017	2018
Diede de Groot (2)	2019	**2021**	2018	2019
Diede de Groot (3)	2021	**2022**	2021	2020
Diede de Groot (4)	2022	**2023**	2022	2021
Diede de Groot (5)	2023	**2024**	2023	2022
Diede de Groot (6)	2024	**2026**	2024	2023
Yui Kamiji	2017	2014	**2026**	2014

==== Wheelchair women's doubles ====
===== Individual =====
Player	Australian Open	French Open	Wimbledon	US Open
Esther Vergeer	2004	2007	**2009**	2005
Korie Homan	2009	2009	**2009**	2005
Esther Vergeer (2)	2006	2008	**2010**	2006
Sharon Walraven	2011	**2011**	2010	2010
Esther Vergeer (3)	2007	2009	**2011**	2007
Jiske Griffioen	2006	2008	**2012**	2006
Jiske Griffioen (2)	2007	2013	**2013**	2007
Aniek van Koot	2010	2010	2012	**2013**
Yui Kamiji	2014	2014	2014	**2014**
Jordanne Whiley	2014	2014	2014	**2014**
Aniek van Koot (2)	2013	2013	2013	**2015**
Diede de Groot	**2019**	2018	2018	2017
Yui Kamiji (2)	2015	2016	2015	**2018**
Aniek van Koot (3)	2017	2015	2019	**2019**
Yui Kamiji (3)	2016	2017	2016	**2020**
Jordanne Whiley (2)	2015	2016	2015	**2020**
Diede de Groot (2)	**2021**	2019	2019	2018
Diede de Groot (3)	2022	2020	**2023**	2019
Jiske Griffioen (3)	2008	2015	**2023**	2013
Yui Kamiji (4)	2018	2023	2017	**2023**
Yui Kamiji (5)	2020	2025	2018	**2026**

===== Team =====
Player	Australian Open	French Open	Wimbledon	US Open
Esther Vergeer; Korie Homan	2009	2009	**2009**	2005
Esther Vergeer; Sharon Walraven	2011	**2011**	2010	2010
Aniek van Koot; Jiske Griffioen	2013	2013	2012	**2013**
Jordanne Whiley; Yui Kamiji	2014	2014	2014	**2014**
Aniek van Koot; Jiske Griffioen (2)	**2017**	2015	2013	2015
Aniek van Koot; Diede de Groot	2019	2018	2019	**2019**
Jordanne Whiley; Yui Kamiji (2)	2015	2016	2015	**2020**

=== Golden Slam ===
Players who won all four Grand Slam titles and the Paralympic gold medal simultaneously (in a calendar year).

==== Wheelchair women's singles ====
Player	Australian Open	French Open	Wimbledon	US Open	Paralympics
Diede de Groot	2021	2021	2021	2021	2021

=== Career Golden Slam ===
Players who won all four Grand Slam titles and the Paralympic gold medal over the course of their careers.

- The event at which the Career Golden Slam was completed indicated in **bold**

==== Wheelchair women's singles ====
Player	Australian Open	French Open	Wimbledon	US Open	Paralympics
Diede de Groot	2018	2019	2017	2018	**2021**
Yui Kamiji	2017	2014	**2026**	2014	2024

==== Wheelchair women's doubles ====
===== Individual =====
Player	Australian Open	French Open	Wimbledon	US Open	Paralympics
Korie Homan	2009	2009	**2009**	2005	2008
Esther Vergeer	2004	2007	**2009**	2005	2000
Esther Vergeer (2)	2006	2008	**2010**	2006	2004
Sharon Walraven	2011	**2011**	2010	2010	2008
Esther Vergeer (3)	2007	2009	2011	2007	**2012**
Aniek van Koot	2010	2010	2012	2013	**2016**
Jiske Griffioen	2006	2008	2012	2006	**2016**
Aniek van Koot (2)	2013	2013	2013	2015	**2021**
Diede de Groot	2019	2018	2018	2017	**2021**
Yui Kamiji	2014	2014	2014	2014	**2024**

===== Team =====
Player	Australian Open	French Open	Wimbledon	US Open	Paralympics
Aniek van Koot; Jiske Griffioen	2013	2013	2012	2013	**2016**
Aniek van Koot (2); Diede de Groot	2019	2018	2019	2019	**2021**

=== Super Slam ===
Players who won all four Grand Slam titles, the Paralympic gold medal and the year-end championship simultaneously (in a calendar year).

==== Wheelchair women's singles ====
Player	Australian Open	French Open	Wimbledon	US Open	Paralympics	Year-end
Diede de Groot	2021	2021	2021	2021	2021	2021

=== Career Super Slam ===
Players who won all four Grand Slam titles, the Paralympic gold medal and the year-end championship over the course of their careers.

- The event at which the Career Super Slam was completed indicated in **bold**

==== Wheelchair women's singles ====
Player	Australian Open	French Open	Wimbledon	US Open	Paralympics	Year-end
Diede de Groot	2018	2019	2017	2018	**2021**	2017
Yui Kamiji	2017	2014	**2026**	2014	2024	2013

==== Wheelchair women's doubles ====
===== Individual =====
Player	Australian Open	French Open	Wimbledon	US Open	Paralympics	Year-end
Esther Vergeer	2004	2007	**2009**	2005	2000	2001
Korie Homan	2009	2009	**2009**	2005	2008	2004
Esther Vergeer (2)	2006	2008	**2010**	2006	2004	2002
Sharon Walraven	2011	**2011**	2010	2010	2008	2010
Esther Vergeer (3)	2007	2009	2011	2007	**2012**	2002
Aniek van Koot	2010	2010	2012	2013	**2016**	2010
Jiske Griffioen	2006	2008	2012	2006	**2016**	2004
Aniek van Koot (2)	2013	2013	2013	2015	**2021**	2012
Diede de Groot	2019	2018	2018	2017	**2021**	2016
Yui Kamiji	2014	2014	2014	2014	**2024**	2013

===== Team =====
Player	Australian Open	French Open	Wimbledon	US Open	Paralympics	Year-end
Aniek van Koot; Jiske Griffioen	2013	2013	2012	2013	**2016**	2012
Aniek van Koot (2); Diede de Groot	2019	2018	2019	2019	**2021**	2019

== Multiple titles in a season ==
=== Three titles in a single season ===
Note: players who won 4 titles in a season are not included here.

Key
**W**	F	SF	QF	#R	RR	Q#	DNQ	A	NH

(W) winner; (F) finalist; (SF) semifinalist; (QF) quarterfinalist; (#R) rounds 4, 3, 2, 1; (RR) round-robin stage; (Q#) qualification round; (DNQ) did not qualify; (A) absent; (NH) not held; (SR) strike rate (events won / competed); (W–L) win–loss record.

==== Wheelchair women's singles ====
Player	Year	Australian Open	French Open	Wimbledon	US Open
Esther Vergeer	2007	W	**W**	NH	**W**
Esther Vergeer (2)	2009	W	**W**	NH	**W**
Esther Vergeer (3)	2011	W	**W**	NH	**W**
Yui Kamiji	2017	W	**W**	SF	**W**
Diede de Groot	2018	W	F	**W**	**W**
Diede de Groot (2)	2019	W	**W**	F	**W**
Diede de Groot (3)	2024	W	**W**	**W**	NH
Yui Kamiji (2)	2025	W	**W**	F	**W**

==== Wheelchair women's doubles ====
Player	Year	Australian Open	French Open	Wimbledon	US Open
Esther Vergeer	2007	**W**	**W**	NH	**W**
Yui Kamiji	2016	**W**	**W**	**W**	NH
Yui Kamiji (2)	2018	**W**	F	**W**	**W**
Diede de Groot	2018	F	**W**	**W**	**W**
Aniek van Koot	2021	**W**	**W**	SF	**W**
Diede de Groot (2)	2021	**W**	**W**	SF	**W**
Aniek van Koot (2)	2022	**W**	**W**	F	**W**
Diede de Groot (3)	2022	**W**	**W**	F	**W**
Li Xiaohui	2025	**W**	F	**W**	**W**
Wang Ziying	2025	**W**	F	**W**	**W**
Yui Kamiji (3)	2026	F	**W**	**W**	**W**
Zhu Zhenzhen	2026	F	**W**	**W**	**W**

==== Wheelchair girls' doubles ====
Player	Year	Australian Open	French Open	Wimbledon	US Open
Seira Matsuoka	2026	**W**	**W**	NH	**W**

=== Surface Slam ===
Players who won Grand Slam titles on clay, grass and hard courts in a calendar year.

==== Wheelchair women's singles ====
Player	Year	Clay court slam	Hard court slam	Grass court slam
Diede de Groot	2021	French Open	Australian Open	Wimbledon
Diede de Groot	2021	French Open	US Open	Wimbledon
Diede de Groot (2)	2022	French Open	Australian Open	Wimbledon
Diede de Groot (2)	2022	French Open	US Open	Wimbledon
Diede de Groot (3)	2023	French Open	Australian Open	Wimbledon
Diede de Groot (3)	2023	French Open	US Open	Wimbledon
Diede de Groot (4)	2024	French Open	Australian Open	Wimbledon

==== Wheelchair women's doubles ====
Player	Year	Clay court slam	Hard court slam	Grass court slam
Esther Vergeer	2009	French Open	Australian Open	Wimbledon
Korie Homan	2009	French Open	US Open	Wimbledon
Esther Vergeer (2)	2011	French Open	Australian Open	Wimbledon
Sharon Walraven	2011	French Open	US Open	Wimbledon
Aniek van Koot	2013	French Open	Australian Open	Wimbledon
Jiske Griffioen	2013	French Open	US Open	Wimbledon
Yui Kamiji	2014	French Open	Australian Open	Wimbledon
Jordanne Whiley	2014	French Open	US Open	Wimbledon
Yui Kamiji (2)	2016	French Open	Australian Open	Wimbledon
Diede de Groot	2018	French Open	US Open	Wimbledon
Aniek van Koot (2)	2019	French Open	Australian Open	Wimbledon
Diede de Groot (2)	2019	French Open	US Open	Wimbledon
Yui Kamiji (3)	2026	French Open	US Open	Wimbledon
Zhu Zhenzhen	2026	French Open	US Open	Wimbledon

=== Career Surface Slam ===
Players who won Grand Slam titles on clay, grass and hard courts iover the course of their careers.

- The event at which the Career Surface Slam was completed indicated in **bold**

==== Wheelchair women's singles ====
Player	Clay court slam	Hard court slam	Grass court slam
Jiske Griffioen	2015 French Open	2015 Australian Open	**2016 Wimbledon**
Diede de Groot	**2019 French Open**	2018 Australian Open	2017 Wimbledon
Diede de Groot (2)	**2021 French Open**	2018 US Open	2018 Wimbledon
Diede de Groot (3)	**2022 French Open**	2019 Australian Open	2021 Wimbledon
Diede de Groot (4)	**2023 French Open**	2019 US Open	2022 Wimbledon
Diede de Groot (5)	**2024 French Open**	2020 US Open	2023 Wimbledon
Diede de Groot (6)	**2026 French Open**	2021 Australian Open	2024 Wimbledon
Yui Kamiji	2014 French Open	2014 US Open	**2026 Wimbledon**

==== Wheelchair women's doubles ====
===== Individual =====
Player	Clay court slam	Hard court slam	Grass court slam
Esther Vergeer	2007 French Open	2004 Australian Open	**2009 Wimbledon**
Korie Homan	2009 French Open	2005 US Open	**2009 Wimbledon**
Esther Vergeer (2)	2008 French Open	2005 US Open	**2010 Wimbledon**
Sharon Walraven	2010 French Open	2010 US Open	**2011 Wimbledon**
Esther Vergeer (3)	2009 French Open	2006 Australian Open	**2011 Wimbledon**
Jiske Griffioen	2008 French Open	2006 Australian Open	**2012 Wimbledon**
Aniek van Koot	2010 French Open	2010 Australian Open	**2012 Wimbledon**
Jiske Griffioen (2)	2013 French Open	2006 US Open	**2013 Wimbledon**
Aniek van Koot (2)	2013 French Open	2013 Australian Open	**2013 Wimbledon**
Yui Kamiji	2014 French Open	2014 Australian Open	**2014 Wimbledon**
Jordanne Whiley	2014 French Open	2014 Australian Open	**2014 Wimbledon**
Yui Kamiji (2)	**2016 French Open**	2014 US Open	2015 Wimbledon
Jordanne Whiley (2)	**2016 French Open**	2014 US Open	2015 Wimbledon
Yui Kamiji (3)	**2017 French Open**	2015 Australian Open	2016 Wimbledon
Diede de Groot	2018 French Open	2017 US Open	**2018 Wimbledon**
Aniek van Koot (3)	2015 French Open	2013 US Open	**2019 Wimbledon**
Diede de Groot (2)	2019 French Open	2018 US Open	**2019 Wimbledon**
Yui Kamiji (4)	**2023 French Open**	2016 Australian Open	2017 Wimbledon
Jiske Griffioen (3)	2015 French Open	2007 Australian Open	**2023 Wimbledon**
Diede de Groot (3)	2020 French Open	2019 Australian Open	**2023 Wimbledon**
Kgothatso Montjane	2023 French Open	2023 US Open	**2024 Wimbledon**
Yui Kamiji (5)	**2025 French Open**	2018 Australian Open	2018 Wimbledon
Yui Kamiji (6)	**2026 French Open**	2018 US Open	2021 Wimbledon
Zhu Zhenzhen	2026 French Open	**2026 US Open**	2026 Wimbledon

===== Team =====
Player	Clay court slam	Hard court slam	Grass court slam
Korie Homan; Esther Vergeer	2009 French Open	2005 US Open	**2009 Wimbledon**
Esther Vergeer; Sharon Walraven	2010 French Open	2010 US Open	**2011 Wimbledon**
Jiske Griffioen; Aniek van Koot	**2013 French Open**	2013 Australian Open	2012 Wimbledon
Yui Kamiji; Jordanne Whiley	2014 French Open	2014 Australian Open	**2014 Wimbledon**
Jiske Griffioen; Aniek van Koot (2)	**2015 French Open**	2013 US Open	2013 Wimbledon
Yui Kamiji; Jordanne Whiley (2)	**2016 French Open**	2014 US Open	2015 Wimbledon
Diede de Groot; Aniek van Koot	2018 French Open	2019 Australian Open	**2019 Wimbledon**
Yui Kamiji; Kgothatso Montjane	2023 French Open	2023 US Open	**2024 Wimbledon**
Yui Kamiji; Zhu Zhenzhen	2026 French Open	**2026 US Open**	2026 Wimbledon

=== Channel Slam ===
Players who won the French Open-Wimbledon double.

==== Wheelchair women's singles ====
Year	Player
2021	Diede de Groot
2022	Diede de Groot (2)
2023	Diede de Groot (3)
2024	Diede de Groot (4)

==== Wheelchair women's doubles ====
Year	Player
2009	Esther Vergeer
2009	Korie Homan
2011	Esther Vergeer (2)
2011	Sharon Walraven
2013	Aniek van Koot
2013	Jiske Griffioen
2014	Jordanne Whiley
2014	Yui Kamiji
2016	Jordanne Whiley (2)
2016	Yui Kamiji (2)
2017	Yui Kamiji (3)
2018	Diede de Groot
2019	Aniek van Koot (2)
2019	Diede de Groot (2)
2026	Yui Kamiji (4)
2026	Zhu Zhenzhen

== See also ==
- List of men's wheelchair tennis champions
- List of quad wheelchair tennis champions
