= Wheelchair tennis at the 2024 Summer Paralympics – Women's doubles =

Wheelchair tennis – Women's doubles at the XVII Paralympic Games
- Paralympic wheelchair tennis
- Venue: Stade Roland Garros
- Date: 30 August – 5 September 2024
- Competitors: 26 from 9 nations

Medalists
1st place, gold medalist(s)		Yui Kamiji; Manami Tanaka	Japan
2nd place, silver medalist(s)		Diede de Groot; Aniek van Koot	Netherlands
3rd place, bronze medalist(s)		Guo Luoyao; Wang Ziying	China

Women's doubles
- Wheelchair tennis at the 2024 Summer Paralympics

Events
Singles	men	women	quad
Doubles	men	women	quad
← 2020 ·	Summer Paralympics	· 2028 →

The women's doubles wheelchair tennis tournament at the 2024 Paralympic Games in France was held at the Stade Roland Garros in Paris from 30 August to 5 September 2024.

Netherlands' Diede de Groot and Aniek van Koot were the defending gold medalists. They won the silver medal. The gold medal was earned by Yui Kamiji and Manami Tanaka of Japan. The Chinese couple Guo Luoyao and Wang Ziying obtained the bronze medal.

== Seeds ==
1. Diede de Groot / Aniek van Koot (NED) (final)
2. Yui Kamiji / Manami Tanaka (JPN) (champions)
3. Li Xiaohui / Zhu Zhenzhen (CHN) (semifinals)
4. Guo Luoyao / Wang Ziying (CHN) (semifinals)

Click on the seed number of a player to go to their draw section.

== Draw ==
=== Key ===
- Q = Qualifier
- WC = Wild card
- LL = Lucky loser
- Alt = Alternate
- ITF = ITF entry
- PR = Protected ranking
- SR = Special ranking
- SE = Special exempt
- JE = Junior exempt
- JR = Junior Accelerator Programme entrant
- CO = College Accelerator Programme entrant
- NG = Next Gen Accelerator Program entrant
- w/o = Walkover
- r = Retired
- d = Defaulted
- BPC = Bipartite Invitation

First round
D Mathewson (USA); M Phelps (USA)	6	4	[6]
M Ohtani (JPN); S Takamuro (JPN)	4	6	[10]
K Montjane (RSA); M Venter (RSA)	4	6	[10]
C Fairbank (FRA); E Mörch (FRA)	6	1	[4]
A Bernal (COL); Z Rodríguez (COL)	6	4	[11]
K Chasteau (FRA); P Déroulède (FRA)	2	6	[9]
N Awane (MAR); S Benichi (MAR)	1	1
4	LY Guo (CHN); ZY Wang (CHN)	6	6
A Breakwell (GBR); L Shuker (GBR)	2	4
J Bos (NED); L de Greef (NED)	6	6

Quarterfinals
1	D de Groot (NED); A van Koot (NED)	6	6
M Ohtani (JPN); S Takamuro (JPN)	4	1
3	XH Li (CHN); ZZ Zhu (CHN)	w/o
K Montjane (RSA); M Venter (RSA)
A Bernal (COL); Z Rodríguez (COL)	1	4
4	LY Guo (CHN); ZY Wang (CHN)	6	6
J Bos (NED); L de Greef (NED)	3	0
2	Y Kamiji (JPN); M Tanaka (JPN)	6	6

Semifinals
1	D de Groot (NED); A van Koot (NED)	6	6
3	XH Li (CHN); ZZ Zhu (CHN)	2	2
4	LY Guo (CHN); ZY Wang (CHN)	0	1
2	Y Kamiji (JPN); M Tanaka (JPN)	6	6

Gold medal match
1	D de Groot (NED); A van Koot (NED)	6	6^{3}	[8]
2	Y Kamiji (JPN); M Tanaka (JPN)	3	7^{7}	[10]
Bronze medal match
3	XH Li (CHN); ZZ Zhu (CHN)	6^{4}	3
4	LY Guo (CHN); ZY Wang (CHN)	7^{7}	6
