= Wheelchair tennis at the 2020 Summer Paralympics – Women's singles =

Wheelchair tennis – Women's singles at the XVI Paralympic Games
- Paralympic wheelchair tennis
- Venue: Ariake Tennis Park
- Date: 28 August – 3 September 2021
- Competitors: 32

Medalists
1st place, gold medalist(s)		Diede de Groot	Netherlands
2nd place, silver medalist(s)		Yui Kamiji	Japan
3rd place, bronze medalist(s)		Jordanne Whiley	Great Britain

Women's singles
- Wheelchair tennis at the 2020 Summer Paralympics

Events
Singles	men	women	quad
Doubles	men	women	quad
← 2016 ·	Summer Paralympics	· 2024 →

The women's singles wheelchair tennis tournament at the 2020 Paralympic Games in Tokyo is held at the Ariake Tennis Park in Kōtō, Tokyo from 28 August and 3 September 2021.

The reigning champion was Jiske Griffioen, who was not defending her title, having retired in 2017.

Diede de Groot succeeded in the fourth leg of a Golden Slam, having won the Australian Open, French Open and Wimbledon earlier in the year.

== Seeds ==
1. Diede de Groot (NED) (champion)
2. Yui Kamiji (JPN) (final)
3. Aniek van Koot (NED) (semifinals)
4. Jordanne Whiley (GBR) (semifinals)

5. Momoko Ohtani (JPN) (quarterfinals)
6. Kgothatso Montjane (RSA) (second round)
7. Zhu Zhenzhen (CHN) (quarterfinals)
8. Dana Mathewson (USA) (quarterfinals)

Click on the seed number of a player to go to their draw section.

== Draw ==
=== Key ===
- Q = Qualifier
- WC = Wild card
- LL = Lucky loser
- Alt = Alternate
- SE = Special exempt
- PR = Protected ranking
- ITF = ITF entry
- JE = Junior exempt
- w/o = Walkover
- r = Retired
- d = Defaulted
- SR = Special ranking
- BPC = Bipartite Invitation

=== Finals ===
Quarterfinals
1	Diede de Groot (NED)	6	6
5	Momoko Ohtani (JPN)	3	2
4	Jordanne Whiley (GBR)	6	3	7
8	Dana Mathewson (USA)	3	6	5
Wang Ziying (CHN)	6^{7}	6	2
3	Aniek van Koot (NED)	7^{9}	2	6
7	Zhu Zhenzhen (CHN)	5	1
2	Yui Kamiji (JPN)	7	6

Semifinals
1	Diede de Groot (NED)	6	6
4	Jordanne Whiley (GBR)	4	2
3	Aniek van Koot (NED)	2	2
2	Yui Kamiji (JPN)	6	6

Final (gold-medal match)
1	Diede de Groot (NED)	6	7^{7}
2	Yui Kamiji (JPN)	3	6^{1}
Bronze-medal match
4	Jordanne Whiley (GBR)	6	6^{7}	6
3	Aniek van Koot (NED)	4	7^{9}	4

=== Section 1 ===
First round
1	Diede de Groot (NED)	6	6
Macarena Cabrillana (CHI)	1	0
Huang Jinlian (CHN)	6	6
Emmy Kaiser (USA)	1	1
Viktoriia Lvova (RPC)	6	6
Ana Caldeira (BRA)	0	2
Mariska Venter (RSA)	1	2
5	Momoko Ohtani (JPN)	6	6

Second round
1	Diede de Groot (NED)	6	6
Huang Jinlian (CHN)	0	2
Viktoriia Lvova (RPC)	5	1
5	Momoko Ohtani (JPN)	7	6

Quarterfinal
1	Diede de Groot (NED)	6	6
5	Momoko Ohtani (JPN)	3	2

=== Section 2 ===
First round
4	Jordanne Whiley (GBR)	6	6
Angélica Bernal (COL)	0	3
Manami Tanaka (JPN)	6	6
Najwa Awane (MAR)	1	2
Huang Huimin (CHN)	2	4
Sakhorn Khanthasit (THA)	6	6
Charlotte Fairbank (FRA)	0	3
8	Dana Mathewson (USA)	6	6

Second round
4	Jordanne Whiley (GBR)	6	6
Manami Tanaka (JPN)	1	0
Sakhorn Khanthasit (THA)	2	4
8	Dana Mathewson (USA)	6	6

Quarterfinal
4	Jordanne Whiley (GBR)	6	3	7
8	Dana Mathewson (USA)	3	6	5

=== Section 3 ===
First round
6	Kgothatso Montjane (RSA)	6	6
Saki Takamuro (JPN)	2	1
Wang Ziying (CHN)	6	6
Nalani Buob (SUI)	1	0
Emmanuelle Mörch (FRA)	6	6
Liudmila Bubnova (RPC)	2	1
Katharina Krüger (GER)	3	1
3	Aniek van Koot (NED)	6	6

Second round
6	Kgothatso Montjane (RSA)	2	3
Wang Ziying (CHN)	6	6
Emmanuelle Mörch (FRA)	3	0
3	Aniek van Koot (NED)	6	6

Quarterfinal
Wang Ziying (CHN)	6^{7}	6	2
3	Aniek van Koot (NED)	7^{9}	2	6

=== Section 4 ===
First round
7	Zhu Zhenzhen (CHN)	6	6
Johana Martínez (COL)	0	0
Büşra Ün (TUR)	0	0
Lucy Shuker (GBR)	6	6
Shelby Baron (USA)	4	4
Meirycoll Duval (BRA)	6	6
María Florencia Moreno (ARG)	0	1
2	Yui Kamiji (JPN)	6	6

Second round
7	Zhu Zhenzhen (CHN)	7^{7}	6
Lucy Shuker (GBR)	6^{2}	2
Meirycoll Duval (BRA)	0	0
2	Yui Kamiji (JPN)	6	6

Quarterfinal
7	Zhu Zhenzhen (CHN)	5	1
2	Yui Kamiji (JPN)	7	6
