= Wheelchair tennis at the 2020 Summer Paralympics – Women's doubles =

Wheelchair tennis – Women's doubles at the XVI Paralympic Games
- Paralympic wheelchair tennis
- Venue: Ariake Tennis Park
- Date: 27 August – 4 September 2021
- Competitors: 23

Medalists
1st place, gold medalist(s)		Diede de Groot; Aniek van Koot	Netherlands
2nd place, silver medalist(s)		Lucy Shuker; Jordanne Whiley	Great Britain
3rd place, bronze medalist(s)		Yui Kamiji; Momoko Ohtani	Japan

Women's doubles
- Wheelchair tennis at the 2020 Summer Paralympics

Events
Singles	men	women	quad
Doubles	men	women	quad
← 2016 ·	Summer Paralympics	· 2024 →

The women's doubles wheelchair tennis tournament at the 2020 Paralympic Games in Tokyo is held at the Ariake Tennis Park in Kōtō, Tokyo from 27 August to 4 September 2021.

== Seeds ==
1. Diede de Groot (NED) / Aniek van Koot (NED) (champions)
2. Lucy Shuker (GBR) / Jordanne Whiley (GBR) (final)
3. Yui Kamiji (JPN) / Momoko Ohtani (JPN) (semifinals)
4. Saki Takamuro (JPN) / Manami Tanaka (JPN) (quarterfinals)

== Draw ==
Round of 16
Charlotte Fairbank (FRA); Emmanuelle Mörch (FRA)	6	5	2
Liudmila Bubnova (RPC); Viktoriia Lvova (RPC)	2	7	6
Ana Caldeira (BRA); Meirycoll Duval (BRA)	0	0
Huang Huimin (CHN); Huang Jinlian (CHN)	6	6
Wang Ziying (CHN); Zhu Zhenzhen (CHN)	6	6
Shelby Baron (USA); Dana Mathewson (USA)	1	0
Kgothatso Montjane (RSA); Mariska Venter (RSA)	6	6
Angélica Bernal (COL); Johana Martínez (COL)	1	1

Quarterfinals
1	Diede de Groot (NED); Aniek van Koot (NED)	6	6
Liudmila Bubnova (RPC); Viktoriia Lvova (RPC)	2	1
3	Yui Kamiji (JPN); Momoko Ohtani (JPN)	6	6
Huang Huimin (CHN); Huang Jinlian (CHN)	0	0
Wang Ziying (CHN); Zhu Zhenzhen (CHN)	6	6
4	Saki Takamuro (JPN); Manami Tanaka (JPN)	2	1
Kgothatso Montjane (RSA); Mariska Venter (RSA)	2	0
2	Lucy Shuker (GBR); Jordanne Whiley (GBR)	6	6

Semifinals
1	Diede de Groot (NED); Aniek van Koot (NED)	6	6
3	Yui Kamiji (JPN); Momoko Ohtani (JPN)	4	2
Wang Ziying (CHN); Zhu Zhenzhen (CHN)	4	2
2	Lucy Shuker (GBR); Jordanne Whiley (GBR)	6	6

Final (gold-medal match)
1	Diede de Groot (NED); Aniek van Koot (NED)	6	6
2	Lucy Shuker (GBR); Jordanne Whiley (GBR)	0	1
Bronze-medal match
3	Yui Kamiji (JPN); Momoko Ohtani (JPN)	6	7
Wang Ziying (CHN); Zhu Zhenzhen (CHN)	2	6^{3}
