= María Florencia Moreno =

Argentinian wheelchair tennis player (born 1990)

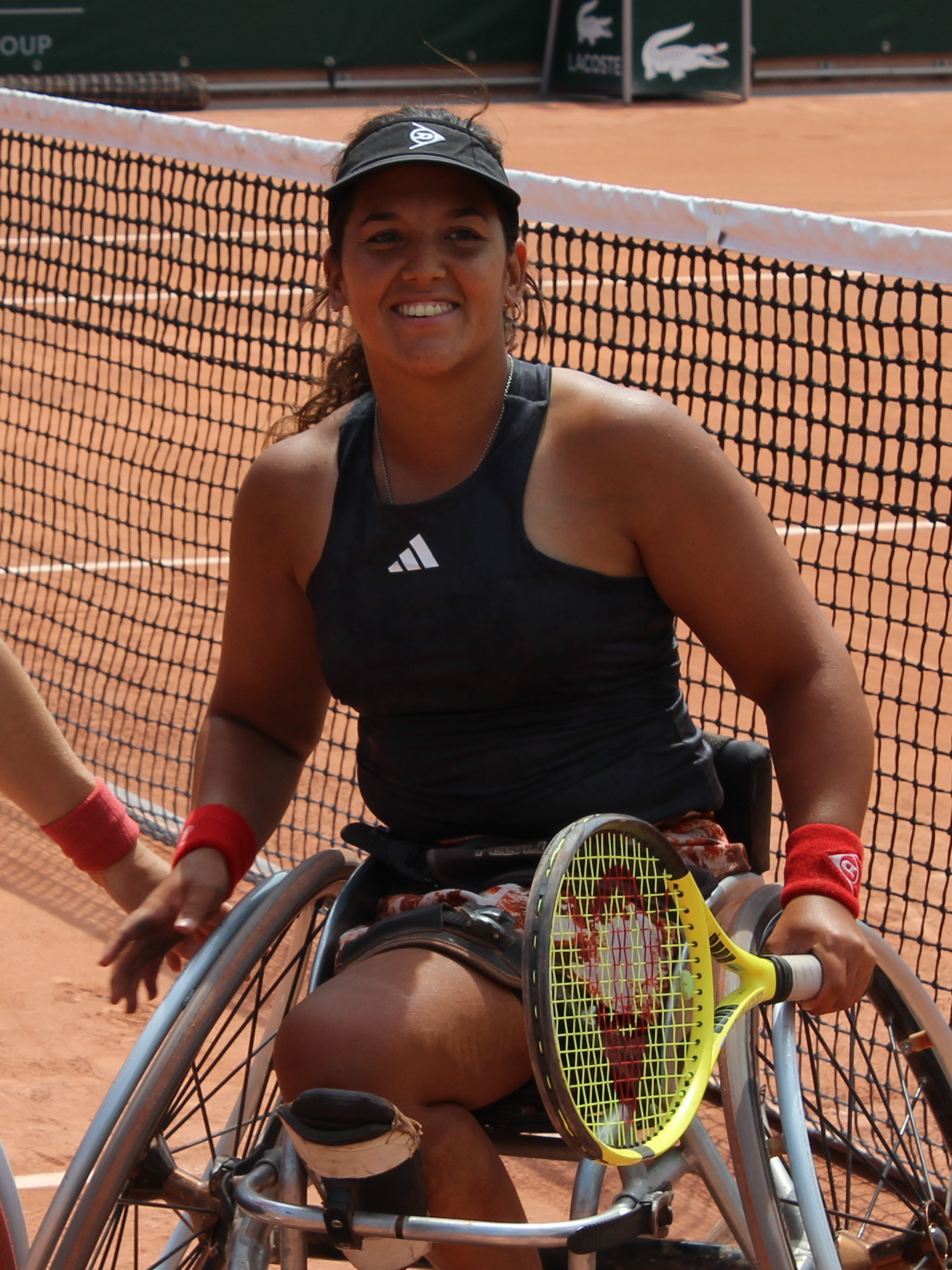
- Moreno at 2023 French Open
- Full name: María Florencia Moreno
- Born: 30 December 1990 (age 34) Cañuelas, Buenos Aires, Argentina
- Turned pro: 2014
- Plays: Left-handed (one-handed backhand)

Singles
- Career titles: 21
- Highest ranking: No. 13 (29 July 2019)
- Current ranking: No. 18 (13 January 2025)

Grand Slam singles results
- Australian Open: 1R (2023, 2024)
- French Open: 1R (2023)
- Wimbledon: 1R (2024)
- US Open: 1R (2024)

Other tournaments
- Paralympic Games: 1R (2020, 2024)

Doubles
- Career titles: 39
- Highest ranking: No. 10 (18 July 2022)
- Current ranking: No. 15 (13 January 2025)

Grand Slam doubles results
- Australian Open: QF (2023, 2024)
- French Open: F (2023)
- Wimbledon: QF (2024)
- US Open: SF (2023)

María Florencia Moreno (born 30 December 1990) is an Argentine wheelchair tennis player. Moreno is the 2023 French Open doubles runner up with Diede de Groot, she was the first Argentine wheelchair tennis player to qualify for Grand Slam when she competed at the 2023 Australian Open.

In 2000, Moreno lost her right leg after being hit by a truck while going out cycling with a friend.
