= Yui Kamiji =

Japanese wheelchair tennis player

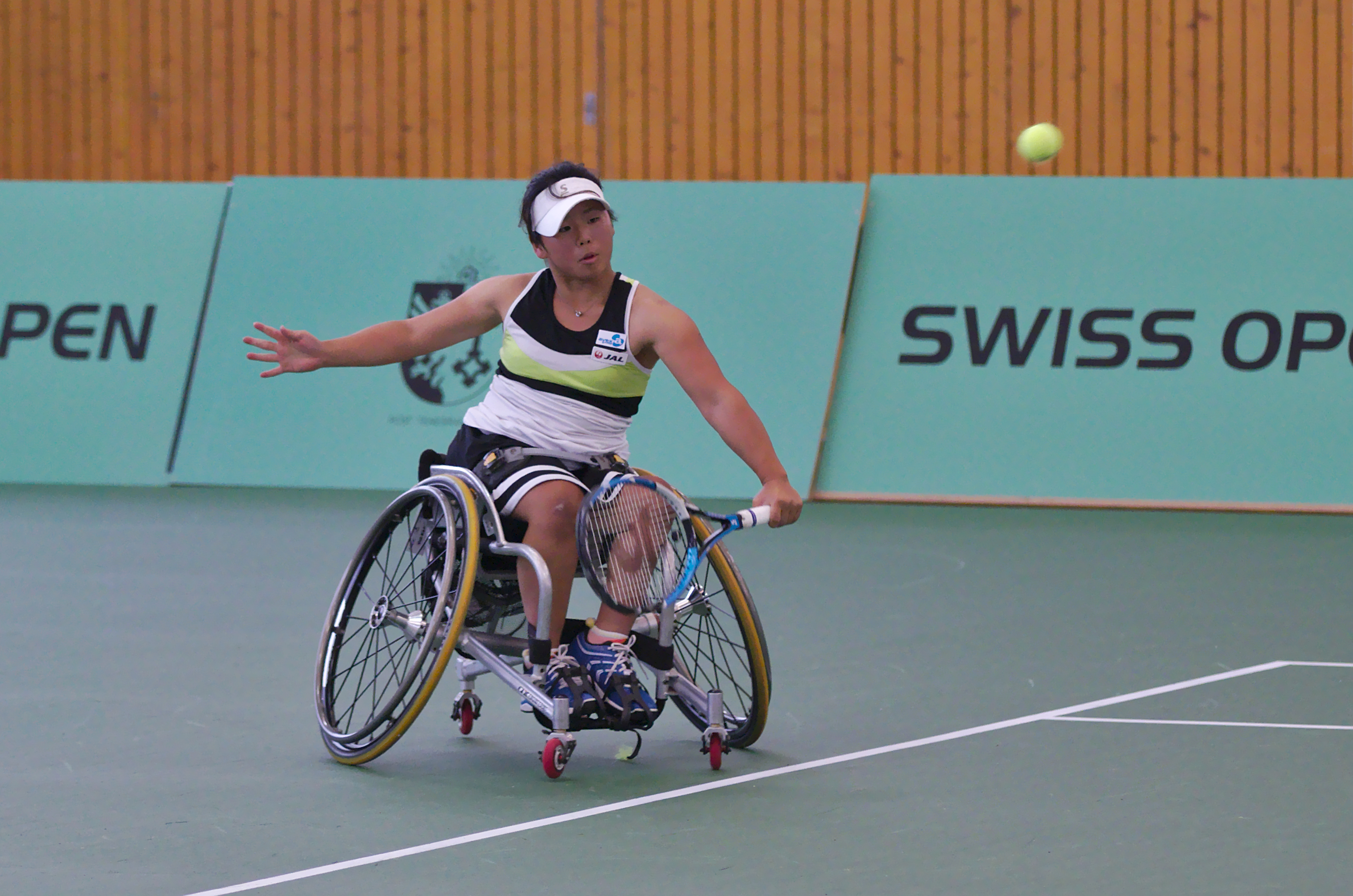
- Kamiji in Geneva, 2014
- Country (sports): Japan
- Born: 24 April 1994 (age 32) Akashi, Hyōgo Prefecture
- Plays: Left-handed (one-handed backhand)

Singles
- Career record: 551–108
- Highest ranking: No. 1 (19 May 2014)
- Current ranking: No. 1 (17 March 2025)

Grand Slam singles results
- Australian Open: W (2017, 2020, 2025)
- French Open: W (2014, 2017, 2018, 2020, 2025)
- Wimbledon: W (2026)
- US Open: W (2014, 2017, 2025, 2026)

Other tournaments
- Masters: W (2013, 2024, 2025)
- Paralympic Games: W (2024)

Doubles
- Career record: 327–90
- Highest ranking: No. 1 (09 June 2014)
- Current ranking: No. 2 (19 June 2023)

Grand Slam doubles results
- Australian Open: W (2014, 2015, 2016, 2018, 2020)
- French Open: W (2014, 2016, 2017, 2023, 2025, 2026)
- Wimbledon: W (2014, 2015, 2016, 2017, 2018, 2021, 2022, 2024, 2026)
- US Open: W (2014, 2018, 2020, 2023, 2026)

Other doubles tournaments
- Masters Doubles: W (2013, 2014, 2025)
- Paralympic Games: W (2024)
Medal record
Paralympic Games
Gold medal – first place	2024 Paris	Singles
Gold medal – first place	2024 Paris	Doubles
Silver medal – second place	2020 Tokyo	Singles
Bronze medal – third place	2020 Tokyo	Doubles
Bronze medal – third place	2016 Rio de Janeiro	Singles
Asian Para Games
Gold medal – first place	2022 Hangzhou	Singles
Silver medal – second place	2014 Incheon	Doubles
Bronze medal – third place	2014 Incheon	Singles

Yui Kamiji (上地 結衣, Kamiji Yui; born 24 April 1994 in Akashi, Hyōgo Prefecture) is a Japanese professional wheelchair tennis player. She has won thirteen major titles in singles, as well as a Paralympic gold medal at the 2024 Paris Paralympics to complete the career Golden Slam. Furthermore, in singles Kamiji won a silver Paralympic medal at the 2020 Tokyo Games, a bronze medal at the 2016 Rio Games, and twice won the year-end Wheelchair Tennis Masters. In doubles, Kamiji has won 25 major titles, as well as a Paralympic gold medal in 2024 and a bronze in 2021, completing a quadruple career Grand Slam and the career Golden Slam.

Partnering Jordanne Whiley, Kamiji achieved the Grand Slam in doubles in 2014, and also won the Wheelchair Tennis Masters in doubles. In total, she has won 36 major titles, five Paralympic medals, and five Wheelchair Tennis Masters events. Kamiji is currently managed by Avex Group under its Avex Challenged Athletes program.

== 2013–present ==
Kamiji won singles titles in Iizuka, Daegu, Paris, St Louis, and became the first and so far only non-Dutchwoman to win the tennis Masters title.

Kamiji won doubles titles with Sharon Walraven in Pensacola, Sabine Ellerbrock in Iizuka. Ju-Yeon Park in Daegu, Jordanne Whiley in Paris and the Masters. With Ellerbrock in New York and Whiley at Wimbledon, Kamiji was the runner up.

During the 2014 season Kamiji won singles titles in Melbourne, Kobe and Iizuka. At the Australian Open Kamiji reached her first Grand Slam singles final where she lost to Sabine Ellerbrock. Kamiji followed that up by winning the second Grand Slam tournament of the season at Roland Garros. Whilst partnering Jordanne Whiley during the 2014 season the pair won the Grand Slam in doubles. They finished the year by adding the Masters crown after defeating Louise Hunt and Katharina Krüger in the final. However, despite the absence of van Koot and Griffioen the pair did not go undefeated throughout the tournament as they lost to Marjolein Buis and Michaela Spaanstra during the round robin group stage.

In 2017, Kamiji finished the year as world No 1, and was named ITF Women's Wheelchair World Champion for the second time in her career.

== Career statistics ==
=== Grand Slam performance timelines ===
Key
W	F	SF	QF	#R	RR	Q#	DNQ	A	NH

(W) winner; (F) finalist; (SF) semifinalist; (QF) quarterfinalist; (#R) rounds 4, 3, 2, 1; (RR) round-robin stage; (Q#) qualification round; (DNQ) did not qualify; (A) absent; (NH) not held; (SR) strike rate (events won / competed); (W–L) win–loss record.
To avoid confusion and double counting, these charts are updated at the conclusion of a tournament or when the player's participation has ended.

==== Wheelchair singles ====
Tournament	2012	2013	2014	2015	2016	2017	2018	2019	2020	2021	2022	2023	2024	2025	2026	Career SR	W–L	Career Win %
Australian Open	QF	A	F	F	SF	W	F	F	W	F	QF	F	F	W	SF	3 / 14	29–11	73%
French Open	QF	A	W	SF	SF	W	W	F	W	F	F	F	QF	W	SF	5 / 14	30–9	77%
Wimbledon	Not held				QF	SF	SF	SF	NH	QF	F	SF	SF	F	W	1 / 10	15–9	63%
US Open	NH	SF	W	F	NH	W	F	F	F	F	F	F	NH	W	W	4 / 12	31–8	79%
Win–Loss	0–2	1–1	8–1	5–3	2–3	10–1	8–3	7–4	8–1	8–4	7–4	10–4	6–3	15–1	12–2	13 / 50	88–37	

==== Wheelchair doubles ====
Tournament	2012	2013	2014	2015	2016	2017	2018	2019	2020	2021	2022	2023	2024	2025	2026	Career SR	Career Win %
Australian Open	SF	A	W	W	W	F	W	SF	W	SF	F	F	F	SF	F	5 / 14	45%
French Open	F	A	W	F	W	W	F	SF	F	F	F	W	F	W	W	6 / 14	45%
Wimbledon	A	F	W	W	W	W	W	SF	NH	W	W	F	W	QF	W	9 / 13	69%
US Open	NH	F	W	SF	NH	SF	W	SF	W	F	F	W	NH	SF	W	5 / 12	36%

=== Grand Slam tournament finals ===
==== Wheelchair singles: 33 finals (13 titles, 20 runner-ups) ====
Result	Year	Championship	Surface	Opponent	Score
Loss	2014	Australian Open	Hard	(Germany) Sabine Ellerbrock	6–3, 4–6, 2–6
Win	2014	French Open	Clay	(Netherlands) Aniek van Koot	7–6^{(9–7)}, 6–4
Win	2014	US Open	Hard	(Netherlands) Aniek van Koot	6–3, 6–3
Loss	2015	Australian Open	Hard	(Netherlands) Jiske Griffioen	3–6, 5–7
Loss	2015	US Open	Hard	(United Kingdom) Jordanne Whiley	4–6, 6–0, 1–6
Win	2017	Australian Open	Hard	(Netherlands) Jiske Griffioen	6–7^{(2–7)}, 6–3, 6–3
Win	2017	French Open (2)	Clay	(Germany) Sabine Ellerbrock	7–5, 6–4
Win	2017	US Open (2)	Hard	(Netherlands) Diede de Groot	7–5, 6–2
Loss	2018	Australian Open	Hard	(Netherlands) Diede de Groot	6–7^{(6–8)}, 4–6
Win	2018	French Open (3)	Clay	(Netherlands) Diede de Groot	2–6, 6–0, 6–2
Loss	2018	US Open	Hard	(Netherlands) Diede de Groot	2–6, 3–6
Loss	2019	Australian Open	Hard	(Netherlands) Diede de Groot	0–6, 2–6
Loss	2019	French Open	Clay	(Netherlands) Diede de Groot	1–6, 0–6
Loss	2019	US Open	Hard	(Netherlands) Diede de Groot	6–4, 1–6, 4–6
Win	2020	Australian Open (2)	Hard	(Netherlands) Aniek van Koot	6–2, 6–2
Loss	2020	US Open	Hard	(Netherlands) Diede de Groot	3–6, 3–6
Win	2020	French Open (4)	Clay	(Japan) Momoko Ohtani	6–2, 6–1
Loss	2021	Australian Open	Hard	(Netherlands) Diede de Groot	3–6, 7–6^{(7–4)}, 6–7^{(4–10)}
Loss	2021	French Open	Clay	(Netherlands) Diede de Groot	4–6, 3–6
Loss	2021	US Open	Hard	(Netherlands) Diede de Groot	3–6, 2–6
Loss	2022	French Open	Clay	(Netherlands) Diede de Groot	4–6, 1–6
Loss	2022	Wimbledon	Grass	(Netherlands) Diede de Groot	4–6, 2–6
Loss	2022	US Open	Hard	(Netherlands) Diede de Groot	6–3, 1–6, 1–6
Loss	2023	Australian Open	Hard	(Netherlands) Diede de Groot	6–0, 2–6, 2–6
Loss	2023	French Open	Clay	(Netherlands) Diede de Groot	2–6, 0–6
Loss	2023	US Open	Hard	(Netherlands) Diede de Groot	2–6, 2–6
Loss	2024	Australian Open	Hard	(Netherlands) Diede de Groot	5–7, 4–6
Win	2025	Australian Open (3)	Hard	(Netherlands) Aniek van Koot	6–2, 6–2
Win	2025	French Open (5)	Clay	(Netherlands) Aniek van Koot	6–2, 6–2
Loss	2025	Wimbledon	Grass	(China) Wang Ziying	3–6, 3–6
Win	2025	US Open (3)	Hard	(China) Li Xiaohui	0–6, 6–1, 6–3
Win	2026	Wimbledon	Grass	(Netherlands) Diede de Groot	6–0, 6–0
Win	2026	US Open (4)	Hard	(Netherlands) Diede de Groot	0–6, 6–1, 6–3

==== Wheelchair doubles: 41 (25 titles, 16 runner-ups) ====
Result	Year	Championship	Surface	Partner	Opponents	Score
Loss	2012	French Open	Clay	(Germany) Sabine Ellerbrock	(Netherlands) Marjolein Buis (Netherlands) Esther Vergeer	0–6, 1–6
Loss	2013	Wimbledon	Grass	(United Kingdom) Jordanne Whiley	(Netherlands) Jiske Griffioen (Netherlands) Aniek van Koot	4–6, 6–7^{(6–8)}
Win	2014	Australian Open	Hard	(United Kingdom) Jordanne Whiley	(Netherlands) Marjolein Buis (Netherlands) Jiske Griffioen	6–2, 6–7^{(3–7)}, 6–2
Win	2014	French Open	Clay	(United Kingdom) Jordanne Whiley	(Netherlands) Jiske Griffioen (Netherlands) Aniek van Koot	7–6^{(7–3)}, 3–6, [10–8]
Win	2014	Wimbledon	Grass	(United Kingdom) Jordanne Whiley	(Netherlands) Jiske Griffioen (Netherlands) Aniek van Koot	2–6, 6–2, 7–5
Win	2014	US Open	Hard	(United Kingdom) Jordanne Whiley	(Netherlands) Jiske Griffioen (Netherlands) Aniek van Koot	6–4, 3–6, 6–3
Win	2015	Australian Open (2)	Hard	(United Kingdom) Jordanne Whiley	(Netherlands) Jiske Griffioen (Netherlands) Aniek van Koot	4–6 6–4, 7–5
Loss	2015	French Open	Clay	(United Kingdom) Jordanne Whiley	(Netherlands) Jiske Griffioen (Netherlands) Aniek van Koot	6–7^{(1–7)}, 6–3 [8–10]
Win	2015	Wimbledon (2)	Grass	(United Kingdom) Jordanne Whiley	(Netherlands) Jiske Griffioen (Netherlands) Aniek van Koot	6–2, 5–7, 6–3
Win	2016	Australian Open (3)	Hard	(Netherlands) Marjolein Buis	(Netherlands) Jiske Griffioen (Netherlands) Aniek van Koot	6–2, 6–2
Win	2016	French Open (2)	Clay	(United Kingdom) Jordanne Whiley	(Netherlands) Jiske Griffioen (Netherlands) Aniek van Koot	6–4, 4–6, [10–6]
Win	2016	Wimbledon (3)	Grass	(United Kingdom) Jordanne Whiley	(Netherlands) Jiske Griffioen (Netherlands) Aniek van Koot	6–4, 6–2
Loss	2017	Australian Open	Hard	(Netherlands) Diede de Groot	(Netherlands) Jiske Griffioen (Netherlands) Aniek van Koot	3–6, 2–6
Win	2017	French Open (3)	Clay	(Netherlands) Marjolein Buis	(Netherlands) Jiske Griffioen (Netherlands) Aniek van Koot	6–3, 7–5
Win	2017	Wimbledon (4)	Grass	(United Kingdom) Jordanne Whiley	(Netherlands) Marjolein Buis (Netherlands) Diede de Groot	2–6, 6–3, 6–0
Win	2018	Australian Open (4)	Hard	(Netherlands) Marjolein Buis	(Netherlands) Diede de Groot (Netherlands) Aniek van Koot	6–0, 6–4
Loss	2018	French Open	Clay	(Netherlands) Marjolein Buis	(Netherlands) Diede de Groot (Netherlands) Aniek van Koot	1–6, 3–6
Win	2018	Wimbledon (5)	Grass	(Netherlands) Diede de Groot	(Germany) Sabine Ellerbrock (United Kingdom) Lucy Shuker	6–1, 6–1
Win	2018	US Open (2)	Hard	(Netherlands) Diede de Groot	(Netherlands) Marjolein Buis (Netherlands) Aniek van Koot	6–3, 6–4
Win	2020	Australian Open (5)	Hard	(United Kingdom) Jordanne Whiley	(Netherlands) Diede de Groot (Netherlands) Aniek van Koot	6–2, 6–4
Win	2020	US Open (3)	Hard	(United Kingdom) Jordanne Whiley	(Netherlands) Marjolein Buis (Netherlands) Diede de Groot	6–3, 6–3
Loss	2020	French Open	Clay	(United Kingdom) Jordanne Whiley	(Netherlands) Diede de Groot (Netherlands) Aniek van Koot	6–7^{(2–7)}, 6–3, [8–10]
Loss	2021	French Open	Clay	(United Kingdom) Jordanne Whiley	(Netherlands) Diede de Groot (Netherlands) Aniek van Koot	3–6, 4–6
Win	2021	Wimbledon (6)	Grass	(United Kingdom) Jordanne Whiley	(South Africa) Kgothatso Montjane (United Kingdom) Lucy Shuker	6–0, 7–6^{(7–0)}
Loss	2021	US Open	Hard	(United Kingdom) Jordanne Whiley	(Netherlands) Diede de Groot (Netherlands) Aniek van Koot	1–6, 2–6
Loss	2022	Australian Open	Hard	(United Kingdom) Lucy Shuker	(Netherlands) Diede de Groot (Netherlands) Aniek van Koot	5–7, 6–3, [2–10]
Loss	2022	French Open	Clay	(South Africa) Kgothatso Montjane	(Netherlands) Diede de Groot (Netherlands) Aniek van Koot	6–7^{(5–7)}, 6–1, [8–10]
Win	2022	Wimbledon (7)	Grass	(United States) Dana Mathewson	(Netherlands) Diede de Groot (Netherlands) Aniek van Koot	6–1, 7–5
Loss	2022	US Open	Hard	(South Africa) Kgothatso Montjane	(Netherlands) Diede de Groot (Netherlands) Aniek van Koot	2–6, 2–6
Loss	2023	Australian Open	Hard	(China) Zhu Zhenzhen	(Netherlands) Diede de Groot (Netherlands) Aniek van Koot	3–6, 2–6
Win	2023	French Open (4)	Clay	(South Africa) Kgothatso Montjane	(Netherlands) Diede de Groot (Argentina) María Florencia Moreno	6–2, 6–3
Loss	2023	Wimbledon	Grass	(South Africa) Kgothatso Montjane	(Netherlands) Jiske Griffioen (Netherlands) Diede de Groot	1–6, 4-6
Win	2023	US Open (4)	Hard	(South Africa) Kgothatso Montjane	(Netherlands) Jiske Griffioen (Netherlands) Diede de Groot	walkover
Loss	2024	Australian Open	Hard	(South Africa) Kgothatso Montjane	(Netherlands) Jiske Griffioen (Netherlands) Diede de Groot	3–6, 6–7^{(2–7)}
Loss	2024	French Open	Clay	(South Africa) Kgothatso Montjane	(Netherlands) Diede de Groot (Netherlands) Aniek van Koot	7–6^{(8–6)}, 6–7^{(2–7)}, [4–10]
Win	2024	Wimbledon (8)	Grass	(South Africa) Kgothatso Montjane	(Netherlands) Diede de Groot (Netherlands) Jiske Griffioen	6–4, 6–4
Win	2025	French Open (5)	Clay	(South Africa) Kgothatso Montjane	(China) Li Xiaohui (China) Wang Ziying	4–6, 7–5, [10–7]
Loss	2026	Australian Open	Hard	(China) Zhu Zhenzhen	(China) Li Xiaohui (China) Wang Ziying	4–6, 3–6
Won	2026	French Open (6)	Clay	(China) Zhu Zhenzhen	(Netherlands) Jinte Bos (Netherlands) Lizzy de Greef	6–3, 6–0
Win	2026	Wimbledon (9)	Grass	(China) Zhu Zhenzhen	(China) Li Xiaohui (China) Wang Ziying	6–4, 7–5
Win	2026	US Open (5)	Hard	(China) Zhu Zhenzhen	(China) Guo Luoyao (Japan) Momoko Ohtani	6–1, 6–2

Awards
Preceded by Aniek van Koot	ITF Wheelchair Tennis World Champion; 2014	Succeeded by Jiske Griffioen
Preceded by Jiske Griffioen; Marjolein Buis; Diede de Groot	Year End Number 1 – Doubles Award; 2014; 2016; 2023	Succeeded by Jiske Griffioen; Diede de Groot; Incumbent
