= 2021 Australian Open – Wheelchair women's doubles =

Wheelchair women's doubles
- 2021 Australian Open

Final
- Champions: (Netherlands) Diede de Groot (Netherlands) Aniek van Koot
- Runners-up: (South Africa) Kgothatso Montjane (United Kingdom) Lucy Shuker
- Score: 6–4, 6–1

Details
- Draw: 4
- Seeds: 2

Events
Singles	men	women		boys	girls
Doubles	men	women	mixed	boys	girls
WC Singles	men	women	quad
WC Doubles	men	women	quad
Legends	men	women	mixed
← 2020 ·	Australian Open	· 2022 →

Diede de Groot and Aniek van Koot defeated Kgothatso Montjane and Lucy Shuker in the final, 6–4, 6–1 to win the women's doubles wheelchair tennis title at the 2021 Australian Open. With the win, de Groot completed the double career Grand Slam.

Yui Kamiji and Jordanne Whiley were the reigning champions, but Whiley did not participate. Kamiji partnered Momoko Ohtani, but was defeated in the semifinals by de Groot and van Koot.

== Seeds ==
1. (Netherlands) Diede de Groot / (Netherlands) Aniek van Koot (champions)
2. (South Africa) Kgothatso Montjane / (United Kingdom) Lucy Shuker (final)

== Draw ==
=== Key ===
- Q = Qualifier
- WC = Wild card
- LL = Lucky loser
- Alt = Alternate
- ITF = ITF entry
- PR = Protected ranking
- SR = Special ranking
- SE = Special exempt
- JE = Junior exempt
- JR = Junior Accelerator Programme entrant
- CO = College Accelerator Programme entrant
- NG = Next Gen Accelerator Program entrant
- w/o = Walkover
- r = Retired
- d = Defaulted

=== Bracket ===
Semifinals
1	(Netherlands) Diede de Groot (Netherlands) Aniek van Koot	7^{11}	6
(Japan) Yui Kamiji (Japan) Momoko Ohtani	6^{9}	4
(Colombia) Angélica Bernal (Chile) Macarena Cabrillana	1	4
2	(South Africa) Kgothatso Montjane (United Kingdom) Lucy Shuker	6	6

Final
1	(Netherlands) Diede de Groot (Netherlands) Aniek van Koot	6	6
2	(South Africa) Kgothatso Montjane (United Kingdom) Lucy Shuker	4	1
