= Momoko Ohtani =

Japanese wheelchair tennis player

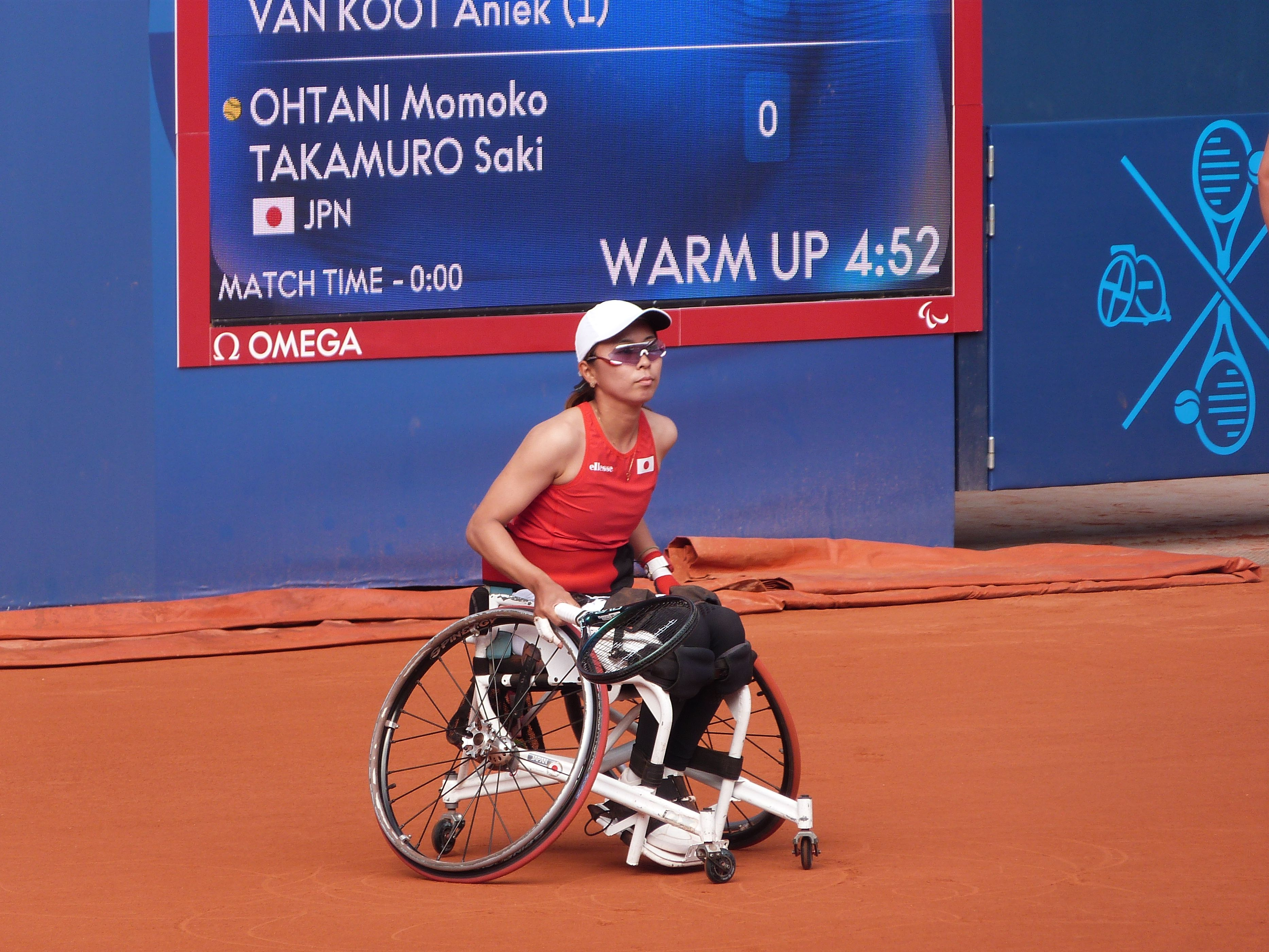
- Country (sports): Japan
- Born: August 24, 1995 (age 31) Tochigi, Tochigi Prefecture
- Plays: Right-handed

Singles
- Career record: 112–55
- Highest ranking: No. 5 (April 19, 2021)

Grand Slam singles results
- Australian Open: SF (2021)
- French Open: F (2020)
- Wimbledon: SF (2021, 2022)
- US Open: SF (2023)

Doubles
- Career record: 79–42
- Highest ranking: No. 9 (June 24, 2019)

Grand Slam doubles results
- Australian Open: SF (2021)
- French Open: SF (2020, 2022)
- Wimbledon: SF (2021, 2022, 2023)
- US Open: F (2026)
Medal record
Paralympic Games
Bronze medal – third place	2020 Tokyo	Doubles
Asian Para Games
Bronze medal – third place	2018 Jakarta	Singles

Momoko Ohtani (大谷 桃子, Ōtani Momoko; born August 24, 1995) is a Japanese wheelchair tennis player. Ohtani has been active in international competitions since 2016.

== Medical history ==
Ohtani was born healthy. She has been playing tennis since the third grade of primary school. After completing secondary school (high school), she contracted an illness for which she was repeatedly hospitalized. Due to the side effects of medication, she developed cramps in her right leg with paralysis in her right foot, as well as a weakened right hand.

== Career ==
In September 2016, Ohtani took part in the Osaka Open, an ITF3 wheelchair tournament, where she immediately reached the final. She won her first singles title in 2017 at the Vancouver (Canada) tournament. In 2019, she won the ITF2 tournament Brasilia Open in Brazil. In 2018, Ohtani won the bronze medal in the women's singles at the Asian Para Games in Jakarta.

In September 2020, Ohtani took part in a grand slam tournament for the first time, at the US Open. A month later, at Roland Garros, she reached the singles final by beating Kgothatso Montjane and then world number one, Diede de Groot; she lost the final match to her compatriot Yui Kamiji. With this final place she rose to seventh position in the world ranking (October 2020).

At the 2020 Summer Paralympics, Ohtani won the bronze medal in doubles alongside Kamiji.

== Career statistics ==
=== Grand Slam Finals ===
==== Wheelchair singles: 1 (1 runner-up) ====
Result	Year	Championship	Surface	Opponent	Score
Loss	2020	French Open	Clay	(Japan) Yui Kamiji	2–6, 1–6

==== Wheelchair doubles: 1 (1 runner-up) ====
Result	Year	Championship	Surface	Partner	Opponent	Score
Loss	2026	US Open	Hard	(China) Guo Luoyao	(Japan) Yui Kamiji (China) Zhu Zhenzhen	1–6, 2–6
