= Guo Luoyao =

Chinese wheelchair tennis player

- Native name: 郭珞瑶
- Country (sports): China
- Residence: Beijing
- Born: 11 November 2001 (age 24)
- College: Beijing Sport University

Grand Slam singles results
- Australian Open: 1R (2026)

Grand Slam doubles results
- Australian Open: QF (2026)

Other doubles tournaments
- Paralympic Games: SF (2024)
- Last updated on: 5 September 2024.

Guo Luoyao (Chinese: 郭珞瑶; born 11 November 2001) is a Chinese wheelchair tennis player. She competed at the 2024 Summer Paralympics, winning the bronze medal in the women's doubles event along with Wang Ziying.

== Career statistics ==
=== Grand Slam performance timelines ===
Key
W	F	SF	QF	#R	RR	Q#	DNQ	A	NH

(W) winner; (F) finalist; (SF) semifinalist; (QF) quarterfinalist; (#R) rounds 4, 3, 2, 1; (RR) round-robin stage; (Q#) qualification round; (DNQ) did not qualify; (A) absent; (NH) not held; (SR) strike rate (events won / competed); (W–L) win–loss record.
To avoid confusion and double counting, these charts are updated at the conclusion of a tournament or when the player's participation has ended.

==== Wheelchair singles ====
Tournament	2026	SR	W–L	Win %
Australian Open	1R	0 / 1	0–1	0%
French Open		0 / 0	0–0	–
Wimbledon		0 / 0	0–0	–
US Open		0 / 0	0–0	–
Win–loss		0 / 0	0–0	–

=== Grand Slam Finals ===
==== Wheelchair doubles: 1 (1 runner-up) ====
Result	Year	Championship	Surface	Partner	Opponent	Score
Loss	2026	US Open	Hard	(Japan) Momoko Ohtani	(Japan) Yui Kamiji (China) Zhu Zhenzhen	1–6, 2–6
