= 2018 US Open – Wheelchair women's singles =

Wheelchair women's singles
- 2018 US Open

Final
- Champion: (Netherlands) Diede de Groot
- Runner-up: (Japan) Yui Kamiji
- Score: 6–2, 6–3

Events
Singles	men	women		boys	girls
Doubles	men	women	mixed	boys	girls
WC Singles	men	women	quad
WC Doubles	men	women	quad
Legends	men	women	mixed
← 2017 ·	US Open	· 2019 →

Diede de Groot defeated the defending champion Yui Kamiji in a rematch of the previous year's final, 6–2, 6–3 to win the women's singles wheelchair tennis title at the 2018 US Open. It was her first US Open singles title, and was her second step towards a non-calendar-year Grand Slam.

== Seeds ==
1. (Netherlands) Diede de Groot (champion)
2. (Japan) Yui Kamiji (final)

== Draw ==
=== Key ===
- Q = Qualifier
- WC = Wild card
- LL = Lucky loser
- Alt = Alternate
- ITF = ITF entry
- PR = Protected ranking
- SR = Special ranking
- SE = Special exempt
- JE = Junior exempt
- JR = Junior Accelerator Programme entrant
- CO = College Accelerator Programme entrant
- NG = Next Gen Accelerator Program entrant
- w/o = Walkover
- r = Retired
- d = Defaulted

=== Bracket ===
Quarterfinals
1	(Netherlands) Diede de Groot	6	6
(Netherlands) Aniek van Koot	1	2
WC	(United States) Dana Mathewson	1	2
(Germany) Sabine Ellerbrock	6	6
(South Africa) Kgothatso Montjane	6	6
(United Kingdom) Lucy Shuker	4	4
(Netherlands) Marjolein Buis	0	0
2	(Japan) Yui Kamiji	6	6

Semifinals
1	(Netherlands) Diede de Groot	6	6
(Germany) Sabine Ellerbrock	0	3
(South Africa) Kgothatso Montjane	1	0
2	(Japan) Yui Kamiji	6	6

Final
1	(Netherlands) Diede de Groot	6	6
2	(Japan) Yui Kamiji	2	3
