= 2021 Australian Open – Wheelchair women's singles =

Wheelchair women's singles
- 2021 Australian Open

Final
- Champion: (Netherlands) Diede de Groot
- Runner-up: (Japan) Yui Kamiji
- Score: 6–3, 6–7^{(4–7)}, 7–6^{(10–4)}

Details
- Draw: 8
- Seeds: 2

Events
Singles	men	women		boys	girls
Doubles	men	women	mixed	boys	girls
WC Singles	men	women	quad
WC Doubles	men	women	quad
Legends	men	women	mixed
← 2020 ·	Australian Open	· 2022 →

Diede de Groot defeated the defending champion Yui Kamiji in the final, 6–3, 6–7^{(4–7)}, 7–6^{(10–4)} to win the women's singles wheelchair tennis title at the 2021 Australian Open. It was the first step in an eventual Super Slam for de Groot.

== Seeds ==
1. (Netherlands) Diede de Groot (champion)
2. (Japan) Yui Kamiji (final)

== Draw ==
=== Key ===
- Q = Qualifier
- WC = Wild card
- LL = Lucky loser
- Alt = Alternate
- ITF = ITF entry
- PR = Protected ranking
- SR = Special ranking
- SE = Special exempt
- JE = Junior exempt
- JR = Junior Accelerator Programme entrant
- CO = College Accelerator Programme entrant
- NG = Next Gen Accelerator Program entrant
- w/o = Walkover
- r = Retired
- d = Defaulted

=== Bracket ===
Quarterfinals
1	(Netherlands) Diede de Groot	6	3	6
(Netherlands) Aniek van Koot	0	6	4
(Japan) Momoko Ohtani	6	6
(United Kingdom) Lucy Shuker	2	2
(Colombia) Angélica Bernal	1	2
(South Africa) Kgothatso Montjane	6	6
(Chile) Macarena Cabrillana	0	1
2	(Japan) Yui Kamiji	6	6

Semifinals
1	(Netherlands) Diede de Groot	6	6
(Japan) Momoko Ohtani	2	4
(South Africa) Kgothatso Montjane	1	7	0
2	(Japan) Yui Kamiji	6	5	6

Final
1	(Netherlands) Diede de Groot	6	6^{4}	7^{10}
2	(Japan) Yui Kamiji	3	7^{7}	6^{4}
