= Manami Tanaka (tennis) =

Japanese wheelchair tennis player

- Born: 10 June 1996 (age 29) Kikuyō, Kumamoto Prefecture, Japan
- Turned pro: 2014
- Plays: Right-handed (one-handed backhand)

Singles
- Career record: 265-174
- Career titles: 24
- Highest ranking: No. 7 (30 January 2023)
- Current ranking: No. 12 (24 June 2024)

Grand Slam singles results
- Australian Open: SF (2023)
- French Open: 1R (2023, 2024, 2026)
- Wimbledon: 1R (2025)
- US Open: QF (2022)

Other tournaments
- Paralympic Games: 2R (2020, 2024)

Doubles
- Career record: 234-126
- Career titles: 47
- Highest ranking: No. 6 (30 January 2023)
- Current ranking: No. 8 (24 June 2024)

Grand Slam doubles results
- Australian Open: F (2025)
- French Open: SF (2023, 2024)
- Wimbledon: QF (2025)
- US Open: SF (2022, 2023)

Other doubles tournaments
- Paralympic Games: W (2024)
Medal record
Paralympic Games
Gold medal – first place	2024 Paris	Doubles

Manami Tanaka (田中 愛美, Tanaka Manami; born 10 June 1996 in Kikuyō Town, Kumamoto Prefecture) is a Japanese wheelchair tennis player, she is world number 12 in singles and world number 8 in doubles. She competed at the 2020 Summer Paralympics. She is a 2023 Australian Open semifinalist in both singles and doubles, she also reached the semifinals at the French Open and US Open in the doubles with partner Dana Mathewson. She would later win a doubles gold medal at the 2024 Paris Paralympics with partner Yui Kamiji.

Tanaka took up wheelchair tennis in high school after she severely injured her spine in a freak accident when she slipped and fell on ice-covered stairs outside of her house which left her paralyzed from the waist down.

== Grand Slam Finals ==
=== Wheelchair doubles: 1 (1 runner-ups) ===
Result	Year	Championship	Surface	Partner	Opponent	Score
Loss	2025	Australian Open	Hard	(China) Zhu Zhenzhen	(China) Li Xiaohui (China) Wang Ziying	2–6, 3–6
