= Charlotte Fairbank =

French wheelchair tennis player

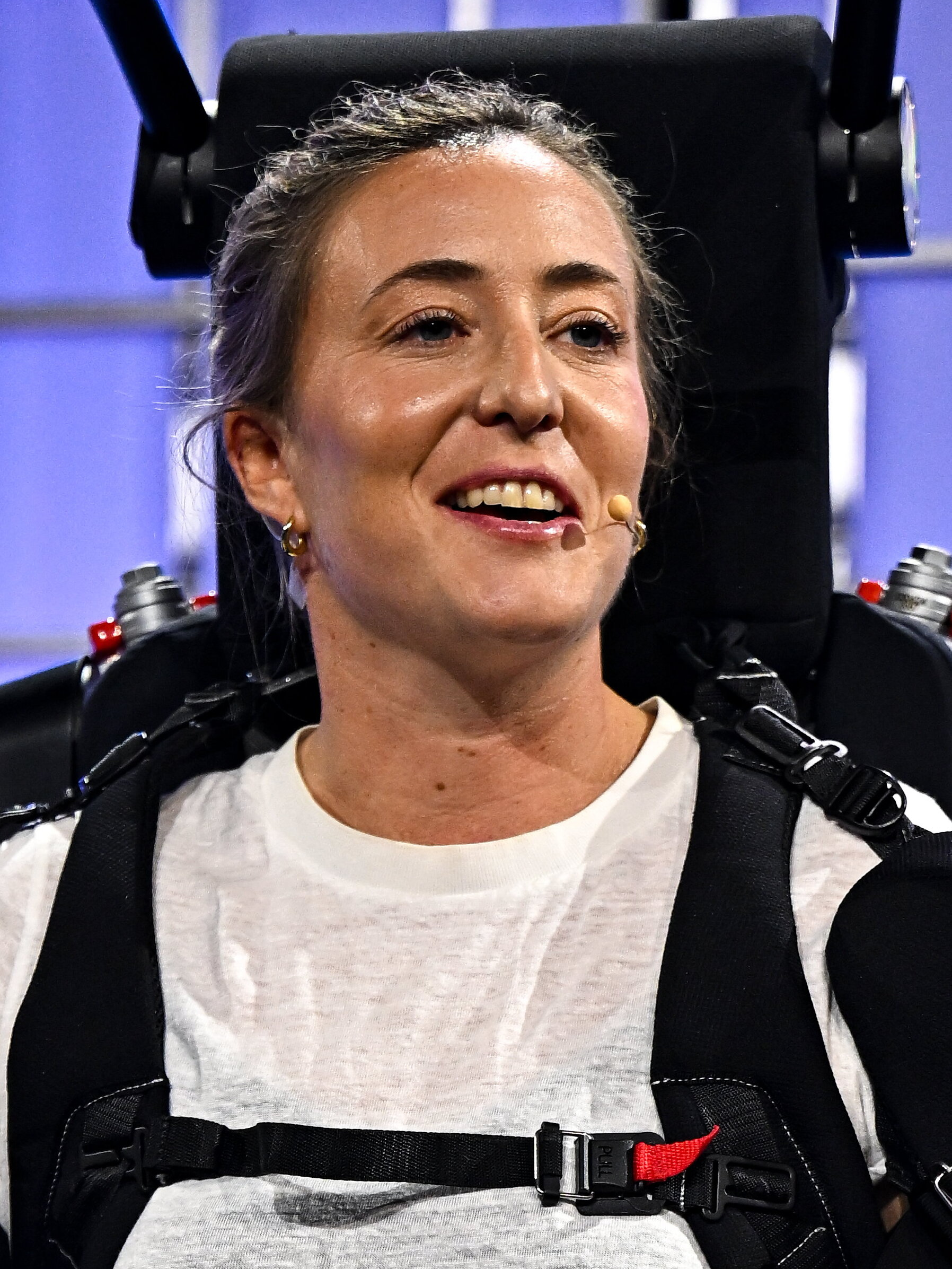
- Fairbank in 2025
- Born: 22 August 1991 (age 34) Paris, France
- Turned pro: 2017
- Plays: Left-handed (one-handed backhand)

Singles
- Career record: 145-158
- Career titles: 6
- Highest ranking: No. 24 (27 June 2022)
- Current ranking: No. 27 (17 June 2024)

Grand Slam singles results
- Australian Open: 1R (2025)

Other tournaments
- Paralympic Games: 1R (2020)

Doubles
- Career record: 89-113
- Career titles: 11
- Highest ranking: No. 19 (4 July 2022)
- Current ranking: No. 24 (17 June 2024)

Grand Slam doubles results
- Australian Open: QF (2025)

Other doubles tournaments
- Paralympic Games: R16 (2020)

Charlotte Fairbank (born 22 August 1991) is a wheelchair tennis player who competes internationally for France. She competed at the 2020 Summer Paralympics but did not medal.

In 2016, Fairbank trained with the Argentine national wheelchair tennis team while she was in Argentina training to be a lawyer. She went into the professional international circuit two years later and climbed to world number 22 in 2022.
