= Mariska Venter =

South African wheelchair tennis player

- Born: 23 April 1996 (age 29)
- Plays: Right-handed (one-handed backhand)

Singles
- Career titles: 20
- Highest ranking: No. 22 (16 June 2025)
- Current ranking: No. 22 (30 June 2025)

Grand Slam singles results
- Australian Open: 1R (2025)

Other tournaments
- Paralympic Games: 1R (2020, 2024)

Doubles
- Career titles: 29
- Highest ranking: No. 19 (25 July 2022)
- Current ranking: No. 20 (30 June 2025)

Grand Slam doubles results
- Australian Open: QF (2025)

Other doubles tournaments
- Paralympic Games: QF (2024)

Mariska Venter (born 23 April 1996) is a South African wheelchair tennis player who was a former junior world number one in 2013. She competed at the 2020 and 2024 Summer Paralympics, she also competed as a wildcard at the 2025 Australian Open but lost in the first round to Jiske Griffioen.

== Doping suspension ==
Venter was given a provisional suspension in December 2022 following a positive test at a wheelchair tennis event in Belgium in July of that year, she found to have had sibutramine and was given a 12-month provisional suspension.
