= Diede de Groot =

Dutch wheelchair tennis player (born 1996)

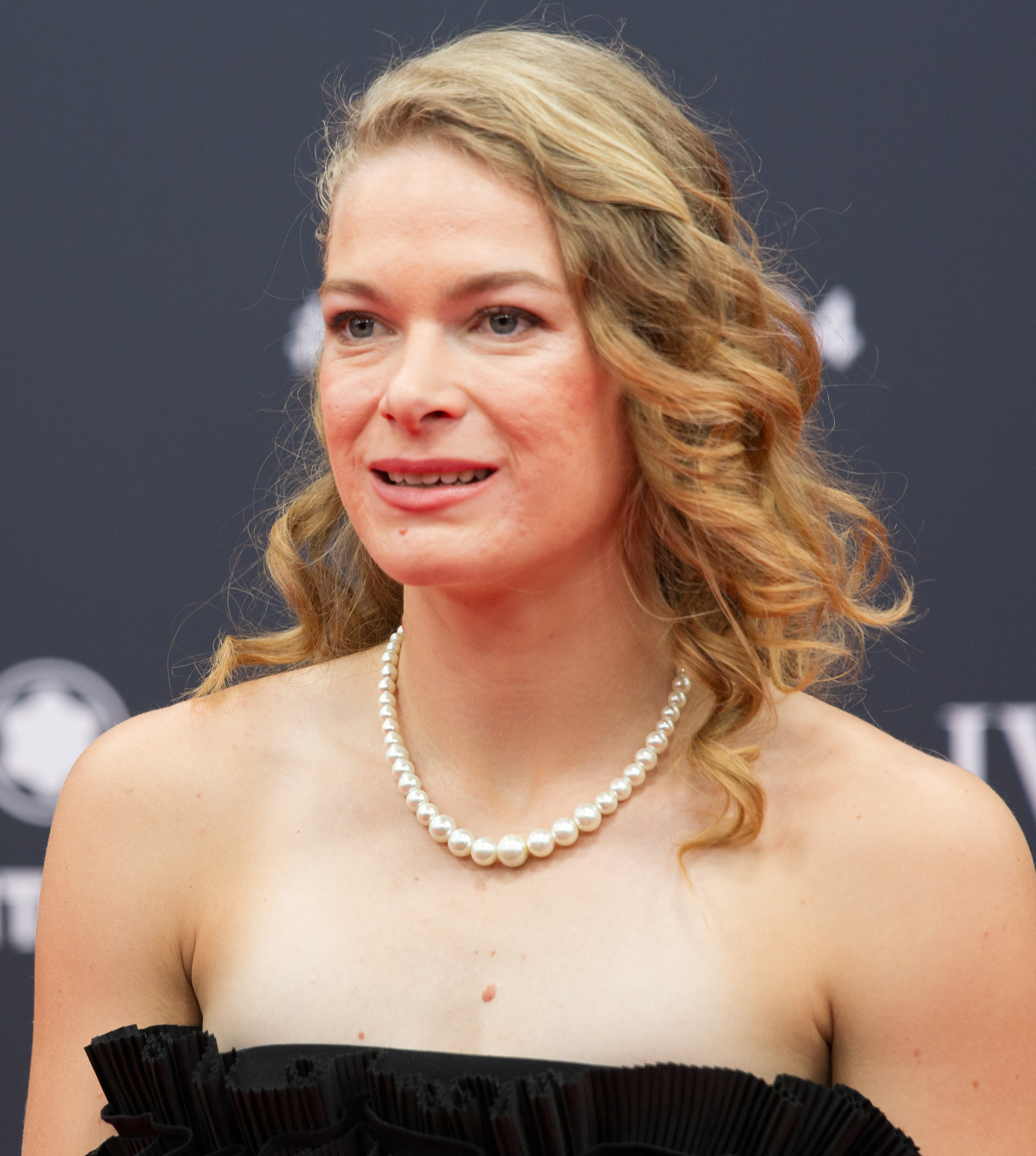
- De Groot at the 25th Laureus World Sports Awards in 2024
- Country (sports): Netherlands
- Born: 19 December 1996 (age 29) Woerden, Netherlands

Singles
- Career record: 405–67 (85.8%)

Grand Slam singles results
- Australian Open: W (2018, 2019, 2021, 2022, 2023, 2024)
- French Open: W (2019, 2021, 2022, 2023, 2024, 2026)
- Wimbledon: W (2017, 2018, 2021, 2022, 2023, 2024)
- US Open: W (2018, 2019, 2020, 2021, 2022, 2023)

Other tournaments
- Masters: W (2017, 2018, 2019, 2021, 2022, 2023)

Doubles
- Career record: 238–60 (79.9%)

Grand Slam doubles results
- Australian Open: W (2019, 2021, 2022, 2023, 2024)
- French Open: W (2018, 2019, 2020, 2021, 2022, 2024)
- Wimbledon: W (2018, 2019, 2023)
- US Open: W (2017, 2018, 2019, 2021, 2022)

Other doubles tournaments
- Masters Doubles: W (2016, 2017, 2019, 2021, 2022)

Team competitions
- World Team Cup: Champion (2011, 2012, 2013, 2014, 2015, 2016, 2018, 2019)
Medal record
Women's wheelchair tennis
Representing Netherlands
Paralympic Games
Gold medal – first place	2020 Tokyo	Women's singles
Gold medal – first place	2020 Tokyo	Women's doubles
Silver medal – second place	2016 Rio de Janeiro	Women's doubles
Silver medal – second place	2024 Paris	Singles
Silver medal – second place	2024 Paris	Doubles
European Championships
Gold medal – first place	2023 Rotterdam	Women's singles

Diede de Groot (pronounced [ˈdidə də ˈɣroːt]; born 19 December 1996) is a Dutch professional wheelchair tennis player who was world No. 1 in both singles and doubles.

De Groot is a 43–time major champion, having won a record 24 titles in singles and 19 in doubles. De Groot had a three-year, 145-match, winning streak in singles, from a defeat in February 2021 to Yui Kamiji until a defeat in May 2024 to Li Xiaohui. During this streak she achieved the first calendar-year Super Slam in tennis history by winning all four major titles, the Paralympic gold medal, and the Wheelchair Tennis Masters title in women's singles in 2021. The following year, she became the first player in any discipline of tennis to defend the Grand Slam and win all four majors in two consecutive years, and did so yet again in 2023. At the 2026 French Open, she became the first player ever to achieve the sextuple career Grand Slam.

In doubles, de Groot completed the Grand Slam in 2019, partnering Aniek van Koot. Apart from her major titles, de Groot has won multiple Wheelchair Tennis Masters titles between 2016 and 2018 in both singles and doubles, as well as gold medals in both disciplines at the 2020 Tokyo Paralympics. She was part of the Dutch team that won the World Team Cup on eight occasions between 2011 and 2019.

== Career ==
=== Early years ===
De Groot was born with unequal leg length and began her wheelchair tennis career at age seven. She started playing on the ITF Wheelchair Tennis Tour in 2009 as a junior player. During her time with the ITF, De Groot won the Cruyff Foundation Junior Masters in 2013 in singles and doubles. The following year, she won the 2014 Junior Masters in doubles.

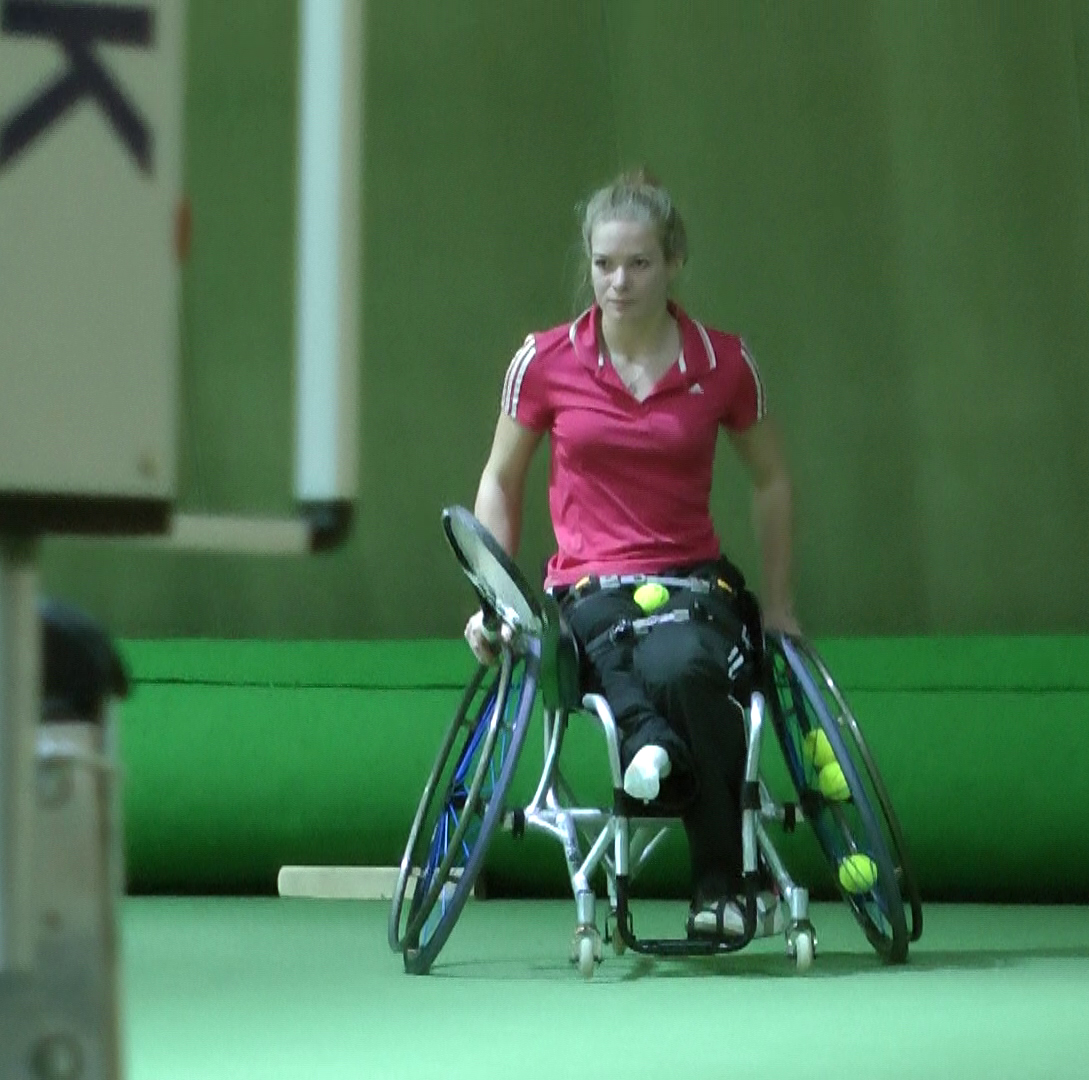
De Groot in 2014

De Groot competed at the 2016 Summer Paralympics in singles and doubles competitions. While De Groot did not medal in singles, she won a silver medal in women's doubles.

She has also appeared at the BNP Paribas World Team Cup in consecutive years from 2011 to 2019. At the World Team Cup, De Groot started as a junior in 2011 before competing a world team competitor in 2012.

=== 2017–2019: First Grand Slam appearances and titles ===
De Groot made her first Grand Slam appearance at the 2017 Australian Open. After placing in the quarterfinals at the Australian Open and the 2017 French Open, de Groot won her first Grand Slam title at the 2017 Wimbledon Championships. She ended the 2017 Grand Slam tournaments with a finals finish at the 2017 US Open. At the start of 2018, she won the 2018 Australian Open and appeared at the final of the 2018 French Open. For the remaining Grand Slams of 2018, De Groot won the women's singles division at the 2018 Wimbledon Championships and her first US Open singles title at the 2018 US Open. In 2019, de Groot rewon the Australian Open title in singles competition at the 2019 Australian Open. At the 2019 French Open, de Groot completed her career Grand Slam when she won her first French Open singles title. Her French Open title also made de Groot the first wheelchair tennis player to complete a Non-calendar year Grand Slam (win all four Grand Slam singles events in a row, but not in the same year). At the 2019 Wimbledon Championships, de Groot ended her back to back singles wins when she was defeated by Aniek van Koot in the final. In 2021, she won the Wimbledon Single Ladies Wheelchair championship.

In doubles, De Groot was a runner up in the 2017 Australian, French and Wimbledon championships. After winning her first doubles title at the 2017 US Open, she lost at the 2018 Australian Open and co-won the doubles event at the 2018 French Open. De Groot became the first woman in wheelchair tennis to win both the women's singles and doubles events at Wimbledon in July 2018. She won her second US Open doubles title at the 2018 US Open alongside Yui Kamiji. At the 2019 Australian Open, De Groot won her first Australian doubles title with Aniek van Koot alongside her singles title in January 2019. At the following Grand Slams, De Groot and Van Koot won the 2019 doubles titles at the French Open and Wimbledon.

In Masters competitions, De Groot won the 2017 and 2018 Wheelchair Tennis Masters in women's singles. Competing in doubles, she won the 2016 Wheelchair Doubles Masters with Lucy Shuker and the 2017 Wheelchair Doubles Masters alongside Marjolein Buis.

=== 2021: Paralympics gold medals and calendar year Super Slam ===
In 2021, De Groot earned the calendar year Super Slam, winning singles titles in the Australian Open, French Open, Wimbledon, US Open, the singles gold medal at the 2020 Summer Paralympics and the singles titles in the Wheelchair Tennis Masters. She was the first professional wheelchair tennis player to achieve the feat in the history of the sport.

De Groot also competed at the 2020 Summer Paralympics, winning gold medals in both singles and doubles.

=== 2022 ===
In June, De Groot won the inaugural women's wheelchair singles title at the Eastbourne International, an ITF 2 grass-court event, defeating Cornelia Oosthuizen in the first round and Kgothatso Montjane in the semifinals before overcoming Yui Kamiji 6–3, 6–2 in the final. The victory marked her sixth singles title of the 2022 season and extended her winning streak to 52 matches.

=== 2023: European Para Championships champion ===
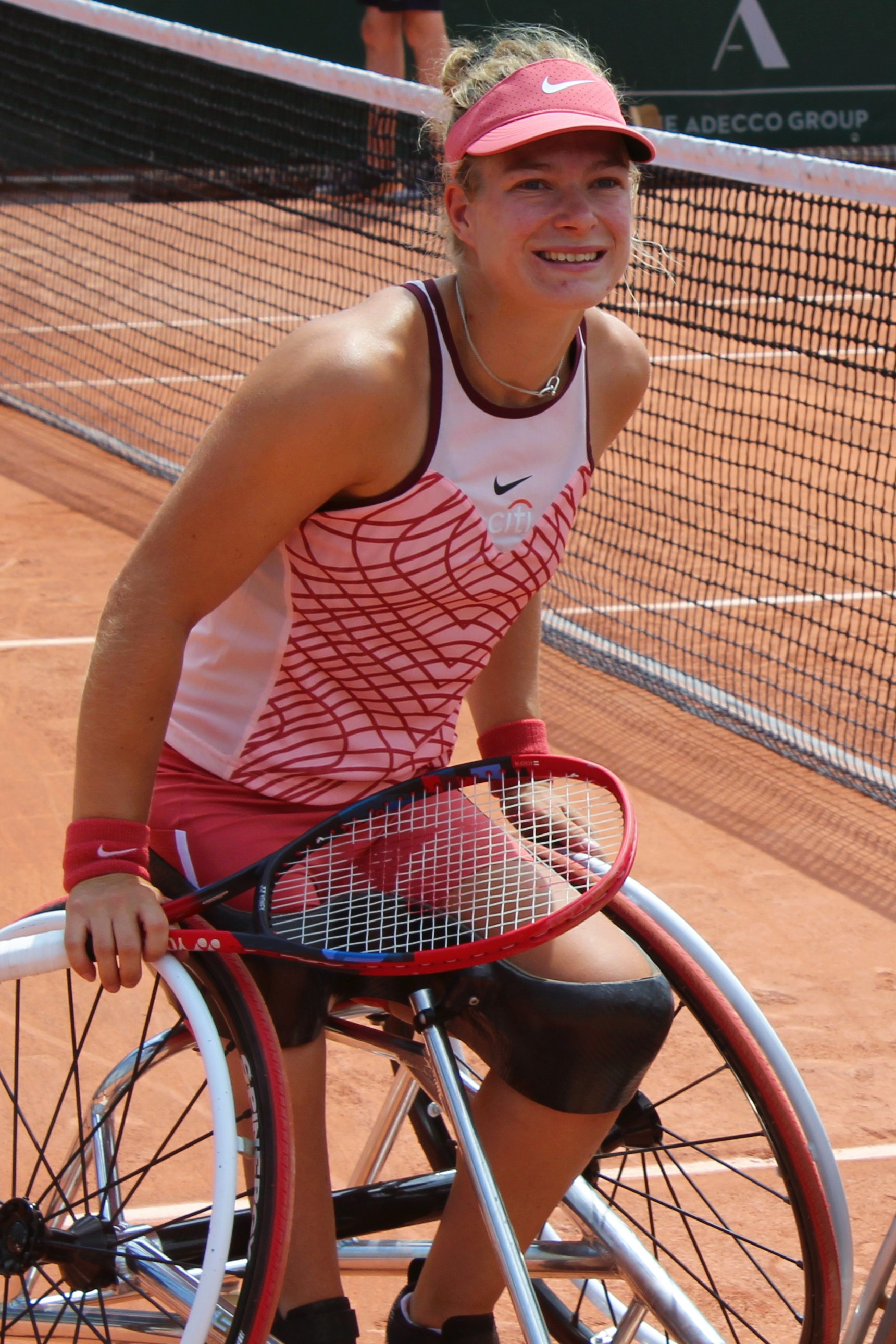
De Groot at the 2023 French Open

De Groot won the singles title at the 2023 European Para Championships in Rotterdam, Netherlands, defeating compatriot Aniek van Koot in two sets.

=== 2024: Sixth Australian Open singles title and more Paralympic medals ===
De Groot won her sixth Australian singles title at the 2024 Australian Open, defeating Kamiji in the final in straight sets. It was her 21st singles title at a Grand Slam tournament, equaling a record set by compatriot Esther Vergeer.

De Groot won silver medals in both women's singles and doubles, partnering with Aniek van Koot, at the 2024 Summer Paralympics.

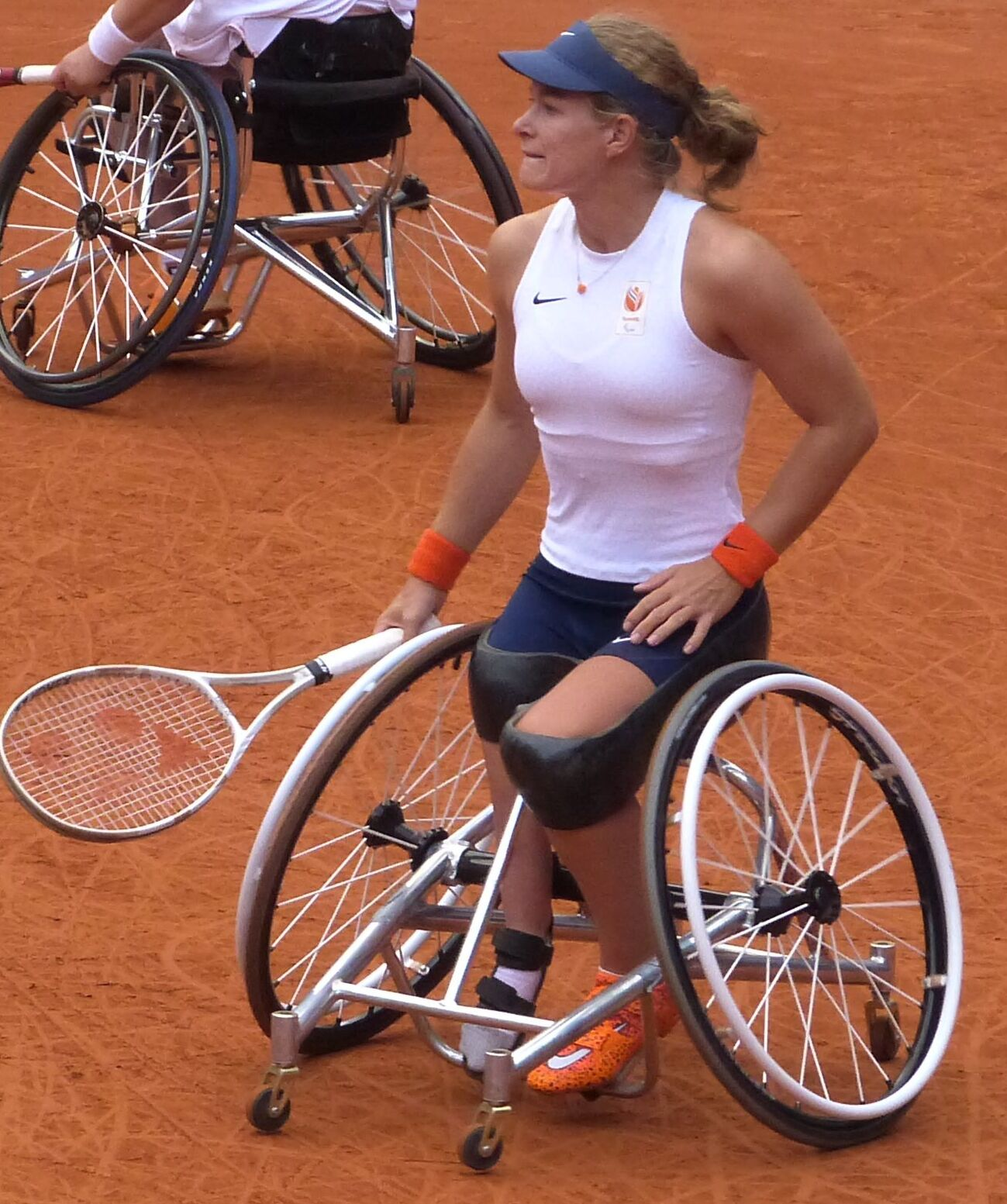
De Groot at the Wheelchair tennis at the 2024 Summer Paralympics Women's Doubles quarter-final

=== 2026: Sixth French Open singles title and sixth career grand slam, Australian Open and Wimbledon runner up ===
Playing at the 2026 Australian Open, de Groot was runner up at the singles tournament, being defeated in two sets by Chinese Li Xiaohui at the final.

At the 2026 French Open, de Groot won her sixth title on wheelchair women's singles after defeating Ksenia Chasteau in two sets at the final, which also marked the sixth time she achieved the singles career slam.

At the 2026 Wimbledon Championships, de Groot was runner up at the singles tournament, being defeated in a double bagel by Japanese Yui Kamiji at the final.

== Awards and honors ==
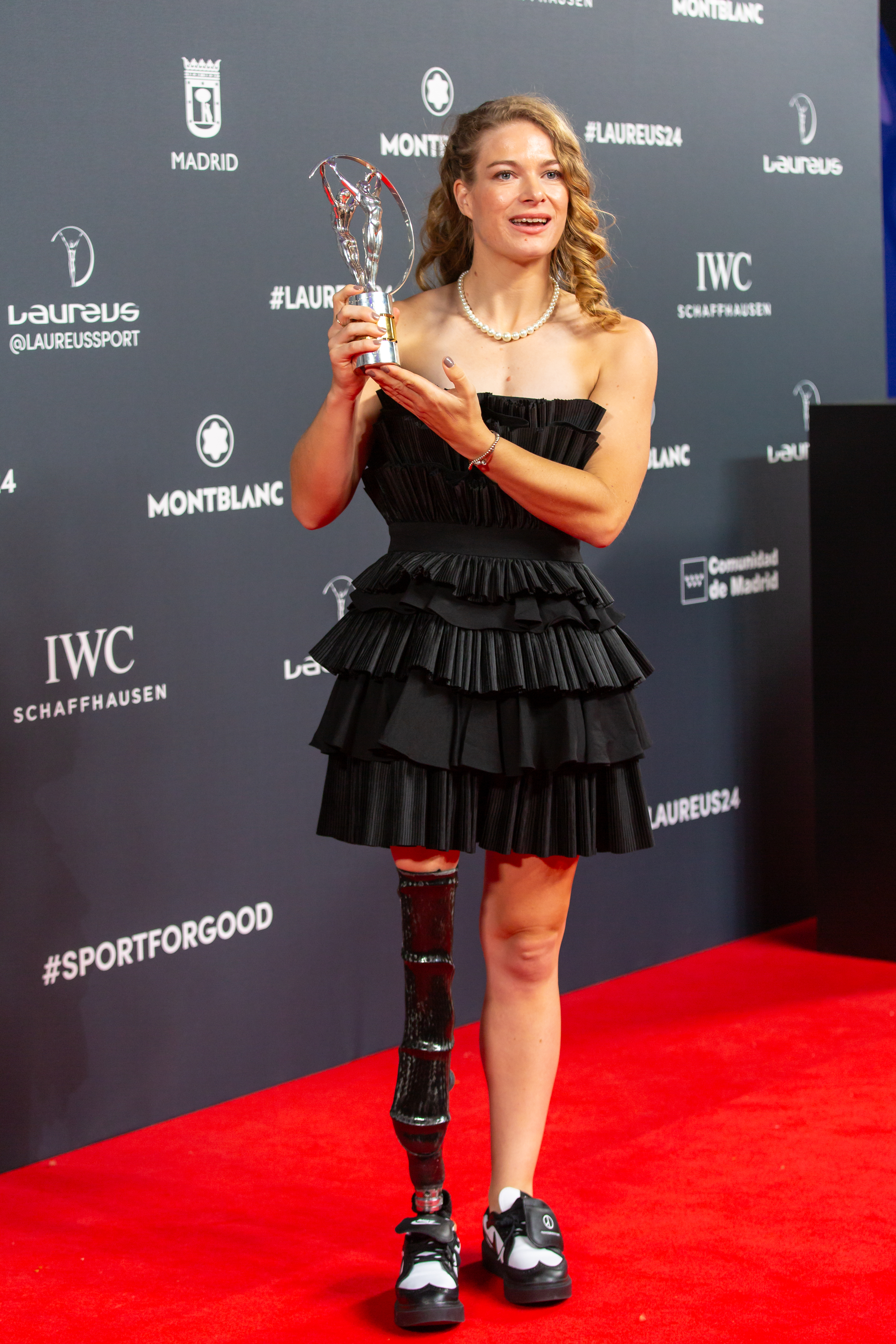
Diede de Groot with her 2024 Laureus trophy.

In 2018, de Groot was named ITF World Champion in women's wheelchair tennis. The following year, she was nominated for the Laureus World Sports Award for Sportsperson of the Year with a Disability in 2019. In 2019, 2021, 2022 and 2023 she was again named ITF World Champion.

In 2024, de Groot was awarded the Laureus World Sports Award for Sportsperson of the Year with a Disability, recognizing her outstanding achievements.

== Career statistics ==
=== Grand Slam performance timelines ===
Key
W	F	SF	QF	#R	RR	Q#	DNQ	A	NH

(W) winner; (F) finalist; (SF) semifinalist; (QF) quarterfinalist; (#R) rounds 4, 3, 2, 1; (RR) round-robin stage; (Q#) qualification round; (DNQ) did not qualify; (A) absent; (NH) not held; (SR) strike rate (events won / competed); (W–L) win–loss record.
To avoid confusion and double counting, these charts are updated at the conclusion of a tournament or when the player's participation has ended.

==== Wheelchair singles ====
Tournament	2017	2018	2019	2020	2021	2022	2023	2024	2025	2026	Career win	W–L	Career SR %
Australian Open	QF	W	W	QF	W	W	W	W	A	F	6 / 9	23–3	88%
French Open	QF	F	W	SF	W	W	W	W	1R	W	6 / 10	24–4	86%
Wimbledon	W	W	F	NH	W	W	W	W	QF	F	6 / 9	25–3	89%
US Open	F	W	W	W	W	W	W	NH	QF	F	6 / 9	26–3	92%
Win–Loss	5–3	11–1	11–1	4–2	12–0	12–0	15–0	12–0	2–3	13–3	24 / 37	98–13	

==== Wheelchair doubles ====
Tournament	2017	2018	2019	2020	2021	2022	2023	2024	2025	2026	Career SR	Career SR %
Australian Open	F	F	W	F	W	W	W	W	A	SF	5 / 9	
French Open	SF	W	W	W	W	W	F	W	QF	SF	6 / 10	
Wimbledon	F	W	W	NH	SF	F	W	F	SF	SF	3 / 9	
US Open	W	W	W	F	W	W	F	NH	F	QF	5 / 9	

=== Grand Slam tournament finals ===
==== Wheelchair singles: 30 (24 titles, 6 runner-ups) ====
Result	Year	Championship	Surface	Opponent	Score
Win	2017	Wimbledon	Grass	(Germany) Sabine Ellerbrock	6–0, 6–4
Loss	2017	US Open	Hard	(Japan) Yui Kamiji	5–7, 2–6
Win	2018	Australian Open	Hard	(Japan) Yui Kamiji	7–6^{(8–6)}, 6–4
Loss	2018	French Open	Clay	(Japan) Yui Kamiji	6–2, 0–6, 2–6
Win	2018	Wimbledon (2)	Grass	(Netherlands) Aniek van Koot	6–3, 6–2
Win	2018	US Open	Hard	(Japan) Yui Kamiji	6–2, 6–3
Win	2019	Australian Open (2)	Hard	(Japan) Yui Kamiji	6–0, 6–2
Win	2019	French Open	Clay	(Japan) Yui Kamiji	6–1, 6–0
Loss	2019	Wimbledon	Grass	(Netherlands) Aniek van Koot	4–6, 6–4, 5–7
Win	2019	US Open (2)	Hard	(Japan) Yui Kamiji	4–6, 6–1, 6–4
Win	2020	US Open (3)	Hard	(Japan) Yui Kamiji	6–3, 6–3
Win	2021	Australian Open (3)	Hard	(Japan) Yui Kamiji	6–3, 6–7^{(4–7)}, 7–6^{(10–4)}
Win	2021	French Open (2)	Clay	(Japan) Yui Kamiji	6–4, 6–3
Win	2021	Wimbledon (3)	Grass	(South Africa) Kgothatso Montjane	6–2, 6–2
Win	2021	US Open (4)	Hard	(Japan) Yui Kamiji	6–3, 6–2
Win	2022	Australian Open (4)	Hard	(Netherlands) Aniek van Koot	6–1, 6–1
Win	2022	French Open (3)	Clay	(Japan) Yui Kamiji	6–4, 6–1
Win	2022	Wimbledon (4)	Grass	(Japan) Yui Kamiji	6–4, 6–2
Win	2022	US Open (5)	Hard	(Japan) Yui Kamiji	3–6, 6–1, 6–1
Win	2023	Australian Open (5)	Hard	(Japan) Yui Kamiji	0–6, 6–2, 6–2
Win	2023	French Open (4)	Clay	(Japan) Yui Kamiji	6–2, 6–0
Win	2023	Wimbledon (5)	Grass	(Netherlands) Jiske Griffioen	6–2, 6–1
Win	2023	US Open (6)	Hard	(Japan) Yui Kamiji	6–2, 6–2
Win	2024	Australian Open (6)	Hard	(Japan) Yui Kamiji	7–5, 6–4
Win	2024	French Open (5)	Clay	(China) Zhu Zhenzhen	4–6, 6–2, 6–3
Win	2024	Wimbledon (6)	Grass	(Netherlands) Aniek van Koot	6–4, 6–4
Loss	2026	Australian Open	Hard	(China) Li Xiaohui	1–6, 2–6
Win	2026	French Open (6)	Clay	(France) Ksénia Chasteau	6–1, 6–0
Loss	2026	Wimbledon	Grass	(Japan) Yui Kamiji	0–6, 0–6
Loss	2026	US Open	Hard	(Japan) Yui Kamiji	2–6, 6–1, 3–6

==== Wheelchair doubles: 28 (19 titles, 9 runner-ups) ====
Result	Year	Championship	Surface	Partner	Opponents	Score
Loss	2017	Australian Open	Hard	(Japan) Yui Kamiji	(Netherlands) Jiske Griffioen (Netherlands) Aniek van Koot	3–6, 2–6
Loss	2017	Wimbledon	Grass	(Netherlands) Marjolein Buis	(Japan) Yui Kamiji (United Kingdom) Jordanne Whiley	6–2, 3–6, 0–6
Win	2017	US Open	Hard	(Netherlands) Marjolein Buis	(United States) Dana Mathewson (Netherlands) Aniek van Koot	6–4, 6–3
Loss	2018	Australian Open	Hard	(Netherlands) Aniek van Koot	(Netherlands) Marjolein Buis (Japan) Yui Kamiji	0–6, 4–6
Win	2018	French Open	Clay	(Netherlands) Aniek van Koot	(Netherlands) Marjolein Buis (Japan) Yui Kamiji	6–1, 6–3
Win	2018	Wimbledon	Grass	(Japan) Yui Kamiji	(Germany) Sabine Ellerbrock (United Kingdom) Lucy Shuker	6–1, 6–1
Win	2018	US Open (2)	Hard	(Japan) Yui Kamiji	(Netherlands) Marjolein Buis (Netherlands) Aniek van Koot	6–3, 6–4
Win	2019	Australian Open	Hard	(Netherlands) Aniek van Koot	(Netherlands) Marjolein Buis (Germany) Sabine Ellerbrock	5–7, 7–6^{(7–4)}, [10–8]
Win	2019	French Open (2)	Clay	(Netherlands) Aniek van Koot	(Netherlands) Marjolein Buis (Germany) Sabine Ellerbrock	6–1, 6–1
Win	2019	Wimbledon (2)	Grass	(Netherlands) Aniek van Koot	(Netherlands) Marjolein Buis (Italy) Giulia Capocci	6–1, 6–1
Win	2019	US Open (3)	Hard	(Netherlands) Aniek van Koot	(Germany) Sabine Ellerbrock (South Africa) Kgothatso Montjane	6–2, 6–0
Loss	2020	Australian Open	Hard	(Netherlands) Aniek van Koot	(Japan) Yui Kamiji (United Kingdom) Jordanne Whiley	2–6, 4–6
Loss	2020	US Open	Hard	(Netherlands) Marjolein Buis	(Japan) Yui Kamiji (United Kingdom) Jordanne Whiley	3–6, 3–6
Win	2020	French Open (3)	Clay	(Netherlands) Aniek van Koot	(Japan) Yui Kamiji (United Kingdom) Jordanne Whiley	7–6^{(7–2)}, 3–6, [10–8]
Win	2021	Australian Open (2)	Hard	(Netherlands) Aniek van Koot	(South Africa) Kgothatso Montjane (United Kingdom) Lucy Shuker	6–4, 6–1
Win	2021	French Open (4)	Clay	(Netherlands) Aniek van Koot	(Japan) Yui Kamiji (United Kingdom) Jordanne Whiley	6–3, 6–4
Win	2021	US Open (4)	Hard	(Netherlands) Aniek van Koot	(Japan) Yui Kamiji (United Kingdom) Jordanne Whiley	6–1, 6–2
Win	2022	Australian Open (3)	Hard	(Netherlands) Aniek van Koot	(Japan) Yui Kamiji (United Kingdom) Lucy Shuker	7–5, 3–6, [10–2]
Win	2022	French Open (5)	Clay	(Netherlands) Aniek van Koot	(Japan) Yui Kamiji (South Africa) Kgothatso Montjane	7–6^{(7–5)}, 1–6, [10–8]
Loss	2022	Wimbledon	Grass	(Netherlands) Aniek van Koot	(Japan) Yui Kamiji (United States) Dana Mathewson	1–6, 5–7
Win	2022	US Open (5)	Hard	(Netherlands) Aniek van Koot	(Japan) Yui Kamiji (South Africa) Kgothatso Montjane	6–2, 6–2
Win	2023	Australian Open (4)	Hard	(Netherlands) Aniek van Koot	(Japan) Yui Kamiji (China) Zhu Zhenzhen	6–3, 6–2
Loss	2023	French Open	Clay	(Argentina) María Florencia Moreno	(Japan) Yui Kamiji (South Africa) Kgothatso Montjane	2-6, 3–6
Win	2023	Wimbledon (3)	Grass	(Netherlands) Jiske Griffioen	(Japan) Yui Kamiji (South Africa) Kgothatso Montjane	6–1, 6–4
Loss	2023	US Open	Hard	(Netherlands) Jiske Griffioen	(Japan) Yui Kamiji (South Africa) Kgothatso Montjane	walkover
Win	2024	Australian Open (5)	Hard	(Netherlands) Jiske Griffioen	(Japan) Yui Kamiji (South Africa) Kgothatso Montjane	6–3, 7–6^{(7–2)}
Win	2024	French Open (6)	Clay	(Netherlands) Aniek van Koot	(Japan) Yui Kamiji (South Africa) Kgothatso Montjane	6–7^{(6–8)}, 7–6^{(7–2)}, [10–4]
Loss	2024	Wimbledon	Grass	(Netherlands) Jiske Griffioen	(Japan) Yui Kamiji (South Africa) Kgothatso Montjane	4–6, 4–6

== See also ==
- List of Grand Slam–related tennis records
