= Kgothatso Montjane =

South African wheelchair tennis player

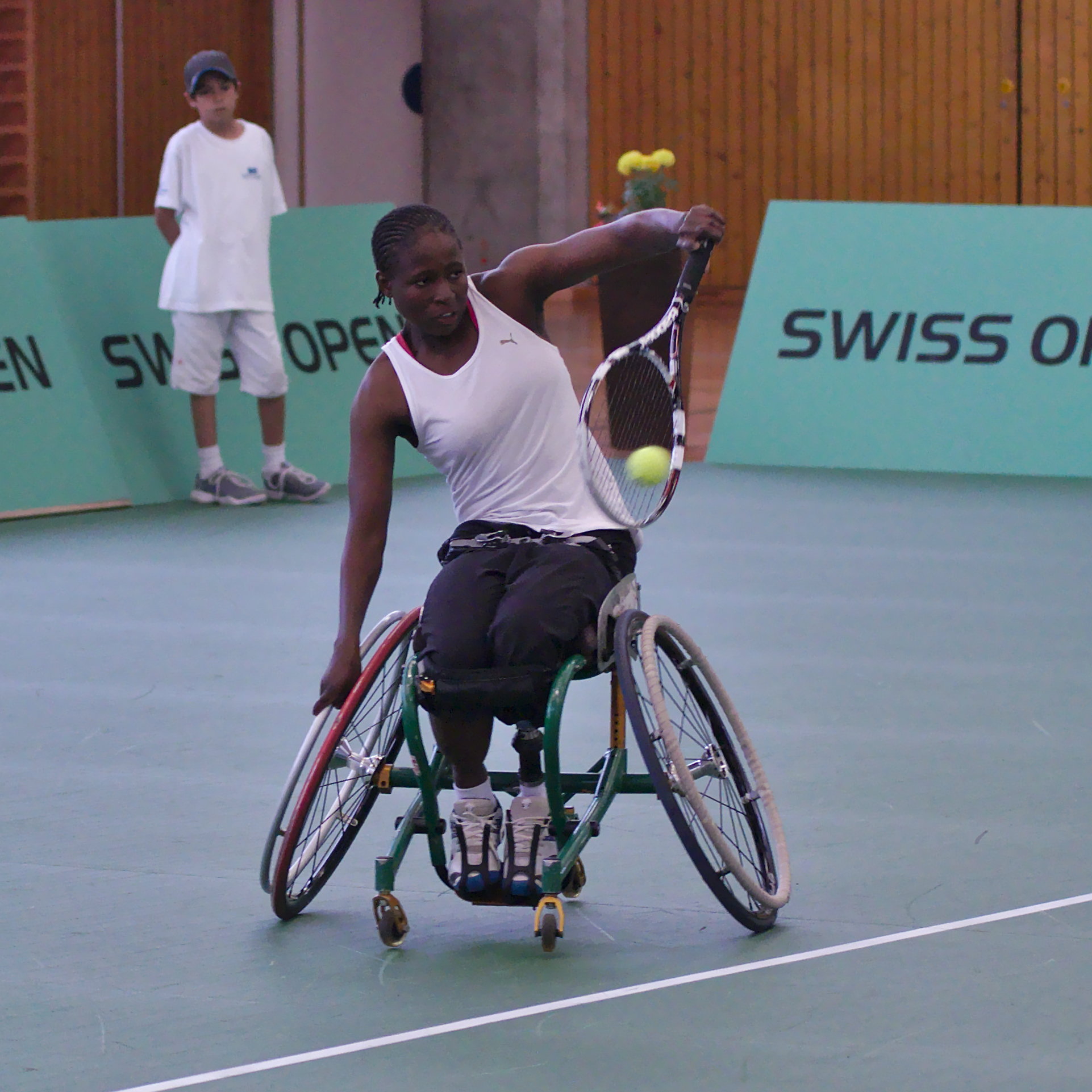
- Montjane in Geneva in 2014
- Country (sports): South Africa
- Born: 3 June 1986 (age 40) Seshego, Limpopo, South Africa

Singles
- Career record: 388–227
- Highest ranking: No. 4 (31 December 2021)
- Current ranking: No. 11 (24 June 2024)

Grand Slam singles results
- Australian Open: SF (2020, 2021, 2022, 2024)
- French Open: SF (2013, 2021, 2022)
- Wimbledon: F (2021)
- US Open: SF (2018)

Other tournaments
- Masters: RR (2012, 2013, 2014, 2015, 2017, 2018, 2019, 2021, 2022)
- Paralympic Games: 2R (2012, 2016, 2020)

Doubles
- Career record: 286–164
- Highest ranking: No. 1 (18 March 2024)
- Current ranking: No. 2 (24 June 2024)

Grand Slam doubles results
- Australian Open: F (2024)
- French Open: W (2023, 2025)
- Wimbledon: W (2024)
- US Open: W (2023)

Other doubles tournaments
- Masters Doubles: W (2023)
- Paralympic Games: QF (2020, 2024)

Kgothatso Montjane (born 3 June 1986) is a South African wheelchair tennis player. In 2024, she became the first black South African woman to win at Wimbledon when she won the wheelchair women's doubles.

== Early life ==
Montjane was born in Seshego on the periphery of Polokwane, Limpopo with a congenital disorder which affected both of her hands and a foot with the other foot being amputated by the age of 12.

== Career ==
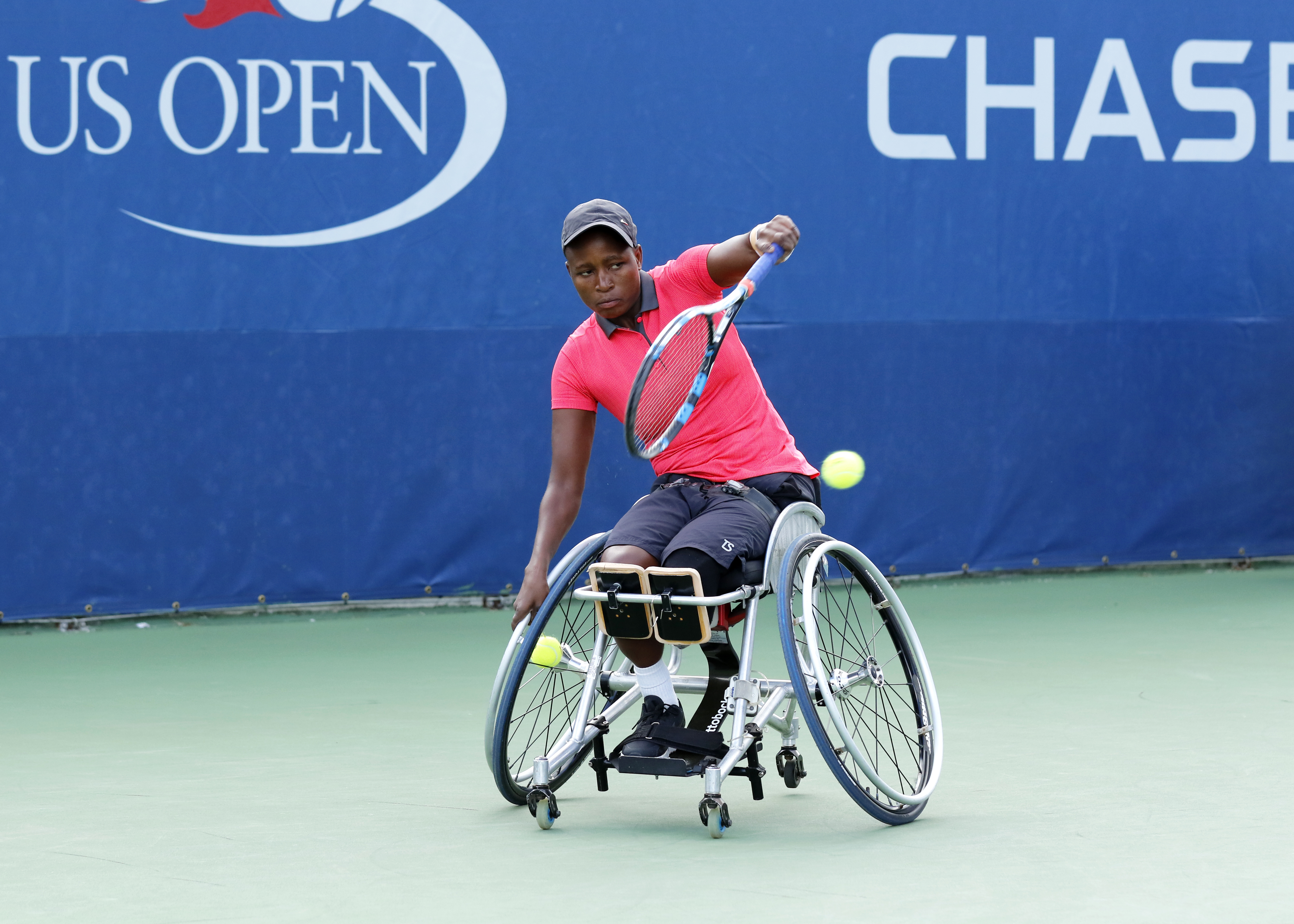
Montjane at the 2017 US Open

Montjane is a successful wheelchair tennis player who is placed in the top 10 of the ITF ranking. Her highest rank was No. 4 on 31 December 2021. She was named South Africa's disabled sportswoman of the year three times, in 2005, 2011, and 2015. Montjane holds 29 singles titles and won tournaments such as the wheelchair Belgian Open and Swiss Open. She is also successful in doubles, where she won, among others, the Belgian Open in 2015 together with Jordanne Whiley. In 2013 and 2014, she participated in 3 of the 4 Grand Slam tournaments, Australian Open, Roland Garros and US Open, where she was able to reach the quarter and semifinals in the singles and the semifinals in all of the doubles tournaments.

She was a member of the South African team at the 2008, 2012 and 2016 Summer Paralympics, but was not able to secure a medal. Besides being a Paralympian, she was a 2009 and 2011 World Team Cup participant for South Africa.

In 2018, she managed to qualify for the prestigious Wimbledon tournament, the first black South African woman to do so. In the same year, she also competed at the US Open and became therefore the first African wheelchair tennis player to qualify for all four Grand Slam tournaments in the same year.

In 2021, she reached her first Grand Slam finals in the single and doubles at Wimbledon.

In 2023, she won the French Open and US Open wheelchair doubles with partner Yui Kamiji.

== Grand Slam tournament finals ==
=== Wheelchair singles: 1 (1 runner-up) ===
Result	Year	Championship	Surface	Opponent	Score
Loss	2021	Wimbledon	Grass	(Netherlands) Diede de Groot	2–6, 2–6

=== Wheelchair doubles: 11 (3 titles, 8 runner-ups) ===
Result	Year	Championship	Surface	Partner	Opponents	Score
Loss	2019	US Open	Hard	(Germany) Sabine Ellerbrock	(Netherlands) Diede de Groot (Netherlands) Aniek van Koot	2–6, 0–6
Loss	2021	Australian Open	Hard	(United Kingdom) Lucy Shuker	(Netherlands) Diede de Groot (Netherlands) Jiske Griffioen	4–6, 1–6
Loss	2021	Wimbledon	Grass	(United Kingdom) Lucy Shuker	(Japan) Yui Kamiji (United Kingdom) Jordanne Whiley	0–6, 6–7^{(0–7)}
Loss	2022	French Open	Clay	(Japan) Yui Kamiji	(Netherlands) Diede de Groot (Netherlands) Aniek van Koot	6–7^{(5–7)}, 6–1, [8–10]
Loss	2022	US Open	Hard	(Japan) Yui Kamiji	(Netherlands) Diede de Groot (Netherlands) Aniek van Koot	2–6, 2–6
Win	2023	French Open	Clay	(Japan) Yui Kamiji	(Netherlands) Diede de Groot (Argentina) María Florencia Moreno	6–2, 6–3
Loss	2023	Wimbledon	Grass	(Japan) Yui Kamiji	(Netherlands) Diede de Groot (Netherlands) Jiske Griffioen	1–6, 4–6
Win	2023	US Open	Hard	(Japan) Yui Kamiji	(Netherlands) Diede de Groot (Netherlands) Jiske Griffioen	walkover
Loss	2024	Australian Open	Hard	(Japan) Yui Kamiji	(Netherlands) Diede de Groot (Netherlands) Jiske Griffioen	3–6, 6–7^{(2–7)}
Loss	2024	French Open	Clay	(Japan) Yui Kamiji	(Netherlands) Diede de Groot (Netherlands) Aniek van Koot	7–6^{(8–6)}, 6–7^{(2–7)}, [4–10]
Win	2024	Wimbledon	Grass	(Japan) Yui Kamiji	(Netherlands) Diede de Groot (Netherlands) Jiske Griffioen	6-4, 6-4
