= Lucy Shuker =

British wheelchair tennis player

Lucy Shuker BEM
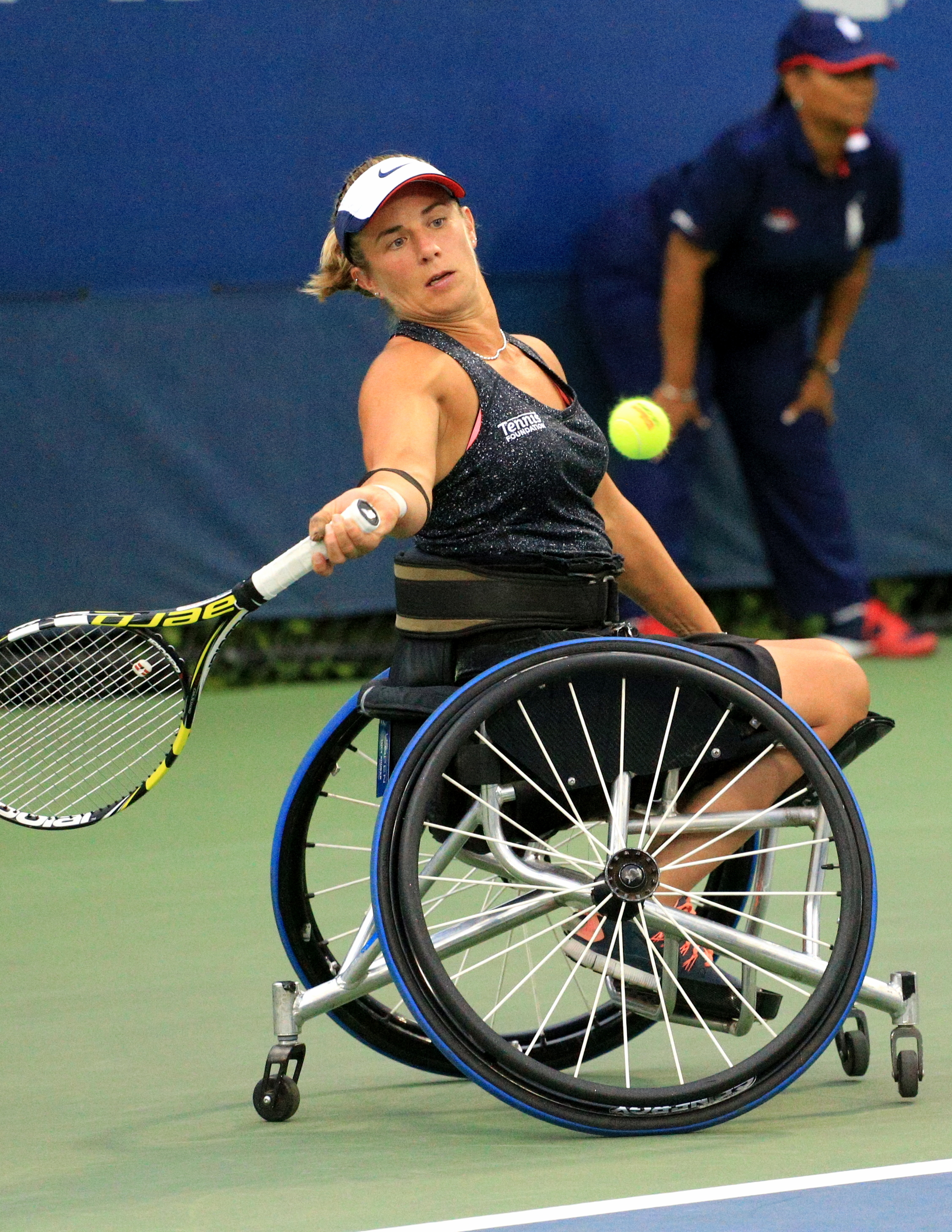
- Shuker at the 2015 US Open.
- Country (sports): Great Britain
- Residence: Fleet, Hampshire
- Born: 28 May 1980 (age 46) Doha, Qatar
- Turned pro: 2002
- Plays: Right Handed
- Official website: https://www.lucyshuker.com/

Singles
- Career record: 492–339
- Career titles: 31
- Highest ranking: No.5 (25 March 2013)

Grand Slam singles results
- Australian Open: SF (2013, 2017, 2022)
- French Open: SF (2007)
- Wimbledon: QF (2016, 2017, 2018, 2021, 2022, 2023)
- US Open: QF (2013, 2015, 2017, 2018, 2020, 2023)

Other tournaments
- Paralympic Games: QF (2012)

Doubles
- Career record: 456–258
- Career titles: 75
- Highest ranking: No.3 (10 June 2013)

Grand Slam doubles results
- Australian Open: F (2010, 2013, 2022)
- French Open: SF (2008, 2009, 2016)
- Wimbledon: F (2009, 2010, 2012, 2018, 2021)
- US Open: SF (2013, 2015, 2017)

Other doubles tournaments
- Masters Doubles: (2016)
- Paralympic Games: Silver medal (2020)

Team competitions
- World Team Cup: Silver Medals (2013, 2014); Bronze Medals (2012, 2015, 2018, 2019)

Lucy Jessica Shuker BEM (born 28 May 1980) is a British wheelchair tennis player who is currently the highest ranked woman in the sport in Britain. A previous singles and doubles National Champion, Shuker has represented Great Britain at four successive Paralympic Games, twice winning a bronze medal in the women's doubles and is former world doubles champion and World Team Cup silver medallist amongst a number of other national and international successes.

In 2008, she competed in the singles and doubles events for the first time in Wheelchair tennis at the Beijing Paralympics.

Shuker made history at the London 2012 Paralympics alongside fellow Briton Jordanne Whiley when the pair became the first women to win a medal for Great Britain in wheelchair tennis, coming from match point down to secure bronze in the women's doubles event.

Shuker and Whiley retained their bronze medal status in the women's wheelchair doubles at the 2016 Paralympic Games in Rio.

== Early life ==
Shuker was born in Doha, Qatar, but grew up in Fleet, Hampshire. She comes from a badminton-playing family and started played badminton at an early age before going on to represent Hampshire County at national competitions, alongside her brother Matthew Shuker, who held a career high world ranking of no.43 in men's singles. Shuker also had a love of horse riding until she had a motorbike accident at the age of 21 which left her paralysed from the T4 vertebra.

== Tennis career ==
Shuker started playing wheelchair tennis in 2002, less than 12 months after her life-changing motorbike accident. She was introduced to the sport by former Quad World No.#1 Pete 'Quadfather' Norfolk during the process of buying her first wheelchair.

In 2013, Shuker became the first British wheelchair tennis player to compete at all four major Tennis Grand Slams in the same year when she competed at the US Open in New York, the same year that she obtained her highest singles ranking to date of world no.5.

In 2016, Shuker won her first Doubles Masters title, partnering Diede de Groot to the title.

In 2018, she made a return to a Grand Slam final when she partnered Sabine Ellerbrock to reach the Wimbledon doubles final, and in 2021 she also reached the Australian Open doubles final with South African partner Kgothatso Montjane. In January 2019, Shuker and Montjane reached the semi-finals of the women's wheelchair doubles at the Australian Open, but were defeated by second seeds Marjolein Buis and Sabine Ellerbrock.

In June 2021, she and Jordanne Whiley were among six tennis players named to represent the UK at the postponed 2020 Paralympics in Tokyo.

Shuker was awarded the British Empire Medal (BEM) in the 2023 Birthday Honours for services to sport.

On 19 July 2024, Shuker was selected for her fifth Paralympics when she was named in the Great Britain team for the Paris edition later that year. Shuker was selected to be the flag bearer for Great Britain for the Parade of Nations at the opening ceremony.

== Personal life ==
Shuker graduated with a BSc Hons in the science and management of exercise and health from the University of Surrey in 2001.

In 2011, she was named the Vitalise Woman of Achievement, and collected the award from disability charity Vitalise in recognition of her achievements in the world of disabled sport.

On 8 November 2017, Shuker was awarded an honorary doctorate of arts from Bournemouth University.

Shuker is a part of the LGBTQ+ community.
