= 2023 French Open – Day-by-day summaries =

The 2023 French Open's day-by-day summaries and order of play for main draw matches on the three main tennis courts, starting from May 28 until June 11.

All dates are in CEST.

== Day 1 (28 May) ==
- Seeds out:
  - Men's singles: (United Kingdom) Dan Evans [20], (United States) Ben Shelton [30]
  - Women's singles: (Greece) Maria Sakkari [8], (Poland) Magda Linette [21], (China) Zhang Shuai [29]
- Schedule of play

Matches on main courts
Matches on Court Philippe Chatrier (Center Court)
Event	Winner	Loser	Score
Women's singles - 1st round	Aryna Sabalenka [2]	(Ukraine) Marta Kostyuk	6–2, 6–2
Men's singles - 1st round	(Greece) Stefanos Tsitsipas [5]	(Czech Republic) Jiří Veselý [PR]	7–5, 6–3, 4–6, 7–6^{(9–7)}
Women's singles - 1st round	(Italy) Camila Giorgi	(France) Alizé Cornet	6–3, 6–4
Men's singles - 1st round	(France) Ugo Humbert	(France) Adrian Mannarino	6–3, 6–3, 6–1
Matches on Court Suzanne Lenglen (Grandstand)
Event	Winner	Loser	Score
Men's singles - 1st round	Karen Khachanov [11]	(France) Constant Lestienne	3–6, 1–6, 6–2, 6–1, 6–3
Women's singles - 1st round	(Czech Republic) Karolína Muchová	(Greece) Maria Sakkari [8]	7–6^{(7–5)}, 7–5
Men's singles - 1st round	Andrey Rublev [7]	(Serbia) Laslo Djere	6–1, 3–6, 6–3, 6–4
Women's singles - 1st round	(United States) Jessica Pegula [3]	(United States) Danielle Collins	6–4, 6–2
Matches on Court Simonne Mathieu
Event	Winner	Loser	Score
Men's singles - 1st round	(Poland) Hubert Hurkacz [13]	(Belgium) David Goffin	6–3, 5–7, 6–4, 2–6, 6–4
Women's singles - 1st round	(Canada) Leylah Fernandez	(Poland) Magda Linette [21]	6–3, 1–6, 6–3
Men's singles - 1st round	(France) Corentin Moutet	(France) Arthur Cazaux [WC]	6–1, 6–3, 4–6, 6–4
Women's singles - 1st round	Daria Kasatkina [9]	(Germany) Jule Niemeier	6–3, 6–4

== Day 2 (29 May) ==
- Seeds out:
  - Men's singles: (Canada) Félix Auger-Aliassime [10], (Germany) Jan-Lennard Struff [21], (Netherlands) Botic van de Zandschulp [25], (Spain) Bernabé Zapata Miralles [32]
  - Women's singles: (Czech Republic) Petra Kvitová [10], Veronika Kudermetova [11], (Switzerland) Belinda Bencic [12], (Czech Republic) Karolína Plíšková [16], (Italy) Martina Trevisan [26]
- Schedule of play

Matches on main courts
Matches on Court Philippe Chatrier (Center Court)
Event	Winner	Loser	Score
Women's singles - 1st round	(United States) Sloane Stephens	(Czech Republic) Karolína Plíšková [16]	6–0, 6–4
Men's singles - 1st round	(Serbia) Novak Djokovic [3]	(United States) Aleksandar Kovacevic	6–3, 6–2, 7–6^{(7–1)}
Women's singles - 1st round	(France) Caroline Garcia [5]	(China) Wang Xiyu	6–4, 6–7^{(4–7)}, 6–4
Men's singles - 1st round	(Italy) Jannik Sinner [8]	(France) Alexandre Müller	6–1, 6–4, 6–1
Matches on Court Suzanne Lenglen (Grandstand)
Event	Winner	Loser	Score
Men's singles - 1st round	(United Kingdom) Cameron Norrie [14]	(France) Benoît Paire [WC]	7–5, 4–6, 3–6, 6–1, 6–4
Women's singles - 1st round	Elina Avanesyan [LL]	(Switzerland) Belinda Bencic [12]	6–3, 2–6, 6–4
Men's singles - 1st round	(Spain) Carlos Alcaraz [1]	(Italy) Flavio Cobolli [Q]	6–0, 6–2, 7–5
Women's singles - 1st round	(Italy) Elisabetta Cocciaretto	(Czech Republic) Petra Kvitová [10]	6–3, 6–4
Matches on Court Simonne Mathieu
Event	Winner	Loser	Score
Women's singles - 1st round	(United States) Kayla Day [Q]	(France) Kristina Mladenovic [WC]	7–5, 6–1
Men's singles - 1st round	(Italy) Fabio Fognini	(Canada) Félix Auger-Aliassime [10]	6–4, 6–4, 6–3
Women's singles - 1st round	(Ukraine) Elina Svitolina [PR]	(Italy) Martina Trevisan [26]	6–2, 6–2
Men's singles - 1st round	(Spain) Alejandro Davidovich Fokina [29]	(France) Arthur Fils [WC]	6–1, 4–6, 6–3, 6–3
Coloured background indicates a night match
Day matches began at 11 am (11:45 am on Court Philippe Chatrier), whilst night match began at 8:15 pm CEST

== Day 3 (30 May) ==
- Seeds out:
  - Men's singles: Daniil Medvedev [2], (Serbia) Miomir Kecmanović [31]
  - Women's singles: (Czech Republic) Barbora Krejčíková [13], Victoria Azarenka [18], (Ukraine) Anhelina Kalinina [25], (Romania) Sorana Cîrstea [30], (Czech Republic) Marie Bouzková [31], (United States) Shelby Rogers [32]
  - Men's doubles: (Croatia) Nikola Mektić / (Croatia) Mate Pavić [8], (Australia) Rinky Hijikata / (Australia) Jason Kubler [15]
- Schedule of play

Matches on main courts
Matches on Court Philippe Chatrier (Center Court)
Event	Winner	Loser	Score
Women's singles - 1st round	(Tunisia) Ons Jabeur [7]	(Italy) Lucia Bronzetti	6–4, 6–1
Men's singles - 1st round	(Brazil) Thiago Seyboth Wild [Q]	Daniil Medvedev [2]	7–6^{(7–5)}, 6–7^{(6–8)}, 2–6, 6–3, 6–3
Women's singles - 1st round	(Poland) Iga Świątek [1]	(Spain) Cristina Bucșa	6–4, 6–0
Men's singles - 1st round	(France) Gaël Monfils [PR]	(Argentina) Sebastián Báez	3–6, 6–3, 7–5, 1–6, 7–5
Matches on Court Suzanne Lenglen (Grandstand)
Event	Winner	Loser	Score
Men's singles - 1st round	(Norway) Casper Ruud [4]	(Sweden) Elias Ymer [Q]	6–4, 6–3, 6–2
Women's singles - 1st round	(United States) Coco Gauff [6]	(Spain) Rebeka Masarova	3–6, 6–1, 6–2
Women's singles - 1st round	(Kazakhstan) Elena Rybakina [4]	(Czech Republic) Brenda Fruhvirtová [Q]	6–4, 6–2
Men's singles - 1st round	(France) Arthur Rinderknech	(France) Richard Gasquet	6–4, 2–6, 6–2, 7–6^{(7–3)}
Matches on Court Simonne Mathieu
Event	Winner	Loser	Score
Women's singles - 1st round	(France) Diane Parry [WC]	(Ukraine) Anhelina Kalinina [25]	6–2, 6–3
Men's singles - 1st round	(Germany) Alexander Zverev [22]	(South Africa) Lloyd Harris [PR]	7–6^{(8–6)}, 7–6^{(7–0)}, 6–1
Men's singles - 1st round	(Denmark) Holger Rune [6]	(United States) Christopher Eubanks	6–4, 3–6, 7–6^{(7–2)}, 6–2
Women's singles - 1st round	(Canada) Bianca Andreescu	Victoria Azarenka [18]	2–6, 6–3, 6–4
Coloured background indicates a night match
Day matches began at 11 am (11:45 am on Court Philippe Chatrier), whilst night match began at 8:15 pm CEST

== Day 4 (31 May) ==
- Seeds out:
  - Men's singles: (Spain) Roberto Bautista Agut [19], (United States) Sebastian Korda [24]
  - Women's singles: (France) Caroline Garcia [5], Liudmila Samsonova [15], (Latvia) Jeļena Ostapenko [17], (China) Zheng Qinwen [19]
  - Men's doubles: (India) Rohan Bopanna / (Australia) Matthew Ebden [6], (United States) Nathaniel Lammons / (United States) Jackson Withrow [16]
  - Women's doubles: (Czech Republic) Barbora Krejčíková / (Czech Republic) Kateřina Siniaková [1]
  - Mixed doubles: (Netherlands) Demi Schuurs / (Netherlands) Jean-Julien Rojer [4]
- Schedule of play

Matches on main courts
Matches on Court Philippe Chatrier (Center Court)
Event	Winner	Loser	Score
Women's singles - 2nd round	(United States) Jessica Pegula [3]	(Italy) Camila Giorgi	6–2, retired
Women's singles - 2nd round	Anna Blinkova	(France) Caroline Garcia [5]	6–4, 3–6, 7–5
Men's singles - 2nd round	(Spain) Carlos Alcaraz [1]	(Japan) Taro Daniel	6–1, 3–6, 6–1, 6–2
Men's singles - 2nd round	(Serbia) Novak Djokovic [3]	(Hungary) Márton Fucsovics	7–6^{(7–2)}, 6–0, 6–3
Matches on Court Suzanne Lenglen (Grandstand)
Event	Winner	Loser	Score
Men's singles - 2nd round	(Greece) Stefanos Tsitsipas [5]	(Spain) Roberto Carballés Baena	6–3, 7–6^{(7–4)}, 6–2
Women's singles - 2nd round	Daria Kasatkina [9]	(Czech Republic) Markéta Vondroušová	6–3, 6–4
Women's singles - 2nd round	Aryna Sabalenka [2]	Iryna Shymanovich [Q]	7–5, 6–2
Men's singles - 2nd round	(United Kingdom) Cameron Norrie [14]	(France) Lucas Pouille [Q]	6–1, 6–3, 6–3
Men's singles - 2nd round (Note: This match was moved to Court Suzanne Lenglen due to match overruns on outer courts.)	(Italy) Lorenzo Musetti [17]	Alexander Shevchenko	6–1, 6–1, 6–2
Matches on Court Simonne Mathieu
Event	Winner	Loser	Score
Women's singles - 2nd round	(Ukraine) Elina Svitolina [PR]	(Australia) Storm Hunter [Q]	2–6, 6–3, 6–1
Men's singles - 2nd round	(Australia) Thanasi Kokkinakis [WC]	(Switzerland) Stan Wawrinka	3–6, 7–5, 6–3, 6–7^{(4–7)}, 6–3
Men's singles - 2nd round	Andrey Rublev [7]	(France) Corentin Moutet	6–4, 6–2, 3–6, 6–3
Women's singles - 2nd round	Elina Avanesyan [LL]	(France) Léolia Jeanjean [WC]	6–0, 7–5
Coloured background indicates a night match
Day matches began at 11 am (11:45 am on Court Philippe Chatrier), whilst night match began at 8:15 pm CEST

== Day 5 (1 June) ==
- Seeds out:
  - Men's singles: (Italy) Jannik Sinner [8], (United States) Tommy Paul [16], (Australia) Alex de Minaur [18]
  - Women's singles: (United States) Madison Keys [20], (Croatia) Donna Vekić [22]
  - Mixed doubles: (United States) Jessica Pegula / (United States) Austin Krajicek [1]
- Schedule of play

Matches on main courts
Matches on Court Philippe Chatrier (Center Court)
Event	Winner	Loser	Score
Men's singles - 2nd round	(Norway) Casper Ruud [4]	(Italy) Giulio Zeppieri [Q]	6–3, 6–2, 4–6, 7–5
Women's singles - 2nd round	(Poland) Iga Świątek [1]	(United States) Claire Liu	6–4, 6–0
Women's singles - 2nd round	(Tunisia) Ons Jabeur [7]	(France) Océane Dodin	6–2, 6–3
Men's singles - 2nd round	(Denmark) Holger Rune [6]	(France) Gaël Monfils [PR]	Walkover
Men's singles - 2nd round (Note: This match was originally scheduled to play on Court Simonne Mathieu but was moved to Court Philippe Chatrier following Gaël Monfils' withdrawal from the tournament.)	(Germany) Alexander Zverev [22]	(Slovakia) Alex Molčan	6–4, 6–2, 6–1
Matches on Court Suzanne Lenglen (Grandstand)
Event	Winner	Loser	Score
Women's singles - 2nd round	(Kazakhstan) Elena Rybakina [4]	(Czech Republic) Linda Nosková	6–3, 6–3
Men's singles - 2nd round	(Germany) Daniel Altmaier	(Italy) Jannik Sinner [8]	6–7^{(0–7)}, 7–6^{(9–7)}, 1–6, 7–6^{(7–4)}, 7–5
Women's singles - 2nd round	(United States) Coco Gauff [6]	(Austria) Julia Grabher	6–2, 6–3
Men's singles - 2nd round	(United States) Taylor Fritz [9]	(France) Arthur Rinderknech	2–6, 6–4, 6–3, 6–4
Matches on Court Simonne Mathieu
Event	Winner	Loser	Score
Women's singles - 2nd round	(United States) Kayla Day [Q]	(United States) Madison Keys [20]	6–2, 4–6, 6–4
Women's singles - 2nd round	Mirra Andreeva [Q]	(France) Diane Parry [WC]	6–1, 6–2
Men's singles - 2nd round	(United States) Frances Tiafoe [12]	Aslan Karatsev [Q]	3–6, 6–3, 7–5, 6–2
Men's singles - 2nd round (Note: This match was moved to Court Simonne Mathieu after the Zverev-Molcan match, which was originally scheduled for Court Simonne Mathieu, was moved to Court Philippe Chatrier.)	(Argentina) Francisco Cerúndolo [23]	(Germany) Yannick Hanfmann [LL]	6–3, 6–3, 6–4
Coloured background indicates a night match
Day matches began at 11 am (11:45 am on Court Philippe Chatrier), whilst night match began at 8:15 pm CEST

== Day 6 (2 June) ==
- Seeds out:
  - Men's singles: Andrey Rublev [7], (Poland) Hubert Hurkacz [13], (United Kingdom) Cameron Norrie [14], (Canada) Denis Shapovalov [26], (Spain) Alejandro Davidovich Fokina [29]
  - Women's singles: (United States) Jessica Pegula [3], Anastasia Potapova [24], (Romania) Irina-Camelia Begu [27]
  - Men's doubles: (Monaco) Hugo Nys / (Poland) Jan Zieliński [7]
  - Mixed doubles: (United States) Desirae Krawczyk / (United Kingdom) Joe Salisbury [2], (Australia) Ellen Perez / (Poland) Jan Zieliński [6]
- Schedule of play

Matches on main courts
Matches on Court Philippe Chatrier (Center Court)
Event	Winner	Loser	Score
Women's singles - 3rd round	(Belgium) Elise Mertens [28]	(United States) Jessica Pegula [3]	6–1, 6–3
Women's singles - 3rd round	Aryna Sabalenka [2]	Kamilla Rakhimova	6–2, 6–2
Men's singles - 3rd round	(Serbia) Novak Djokovic [3]	(Spain) Alejandro Davidovich Fokina [29]	7–6^{(7–4)}, 7–6^{(7–5)}, 6–2
Men's singles - 3rd round	(Spain) Carlos Alcaraz [1]	(Canada) Denis Shapovalov [26]	6–1, 6–4, 6–2
Matches on Court Suzanne Lenglen (Grandstand)
Event	Winner	Loser	Score
Women's singles - 3rd round	Daria Kasatkina [9]	(United States) Peyton Stearns	6–0, 6–1
Men's singles - 3rd round	(Italy) Lorenzo Sonego	Andrey Rublev [7]	5–7, 0–6, 6–3, 7–6^{(7–5)}, 6–3
Women's singles - 3rd round	(United States) Sloane Stephens	(Kazakhstan) Yulia Putintseva	6–3, 3–6, 6–2
Men's singles - 3rd round	(Greece) Stefanos Tsitsipas [5]	(Argentina) Diego Schwartzman	6–2, 6–2, 6–3
Matches on Court Simonne Mathieu
Event	Winner	Loser	Score
Men's singles - 3rd round	Karen Khachanov [11]	(Australia) Thanasi Kokkinakis [WC]	6–3, 6–1, 3–6, 7–6^{(7–5)}
Women's singles - 3rd round	(Ukraine) Elina Svitolina [PR]	Anna Blinkova	2–6, 6–2, 7–5
Men's singles - 3rd round	(Italy) Lorenzo Musetti [17]	(United Kingdom) Cameron Norrie [14]	6–1, 6–2, 6–4
Women's singles - 3rd round	(Czech Republic) Karolína Muchová	(Romania) Irina-Camelia Begu [27]	6–3, 6–2
Coloured background indicates a night match
Day matches began at 11 am (11:45 am on Court Philippe Chatrier), whilst night match began at 8:15 pm CEST

== Day 7 (3 June) ==
- Seeds out:
  - Men's singles: (United States) Taylor Fritz [9], (United States) Frances Tiafoe [12], (Croatia) Borna Ćorić [15]
  - Women's singles: (Kazakhstan) Elena Rybakina [4], Ekaterina Alexandrova [23]
  - Men's doubles: (United States) Rajeev Ram / (United Kingdom) Joe Salisbury [2], (Mexico) Santiago González / (France) Édouard Roger-Vasselin [9], (United Kingdom) Jamie Murray / (New Zealand) Michael Venus [13]
  - Women's doubles: (Ukraine) Lyudmyla Kichenok / (Latvia) Jeļena Ostapenko [4], (Japan) Shuko Aoyama / (Japan) Ena Shibahara [7]
  - Mixed doubles: (Mexico) Giuliana Olmos / (United Kingdom) Neal Skupski [3], (Ukraine) Lyudmyla Kichenok / (Australia) Matthew Ebden [5], (China) Zhang Shuai / (Croatia) Ivan Dodig [8]
- Schedule of play

Matches on main courts
Matches on Court Philippe Chatrier (Center Court)
Event	Winner	Loser	Score
Women's singles - 3rd round	(Spain) Sara Sorribes Tormo [PR]	(Kazakhstan) Elena Rybakina [4]	Walkover
Men's singles - 3rd round	(Denmark) Holger Rune [6]	(Argentina) Genaro Alberto Olivieri [Q]	6–4, 6–1, 6–3
Women's singles - 3rd round	(Poland) Iga Świątek [1]	(China) Wang Xinyu	6–0, 6–0
Men's doubles - 3rd round (Note: This match was moved to Court Philippe Chatrier due to Elena Rybakina's withdrawal from the tournament.)	(Belgium) Sander Gillé (Belgium) Joran Vliegen	(Mexico) Santiago González [9] (France) Édouard Roger-Vasselin [9]	7–5, 6–7^{(3–7)}, 7–6^{(10–5)}
Men's singles - 3rd round	(Germany) Alexander Zverev [22]	(United States) Frances Tiafoe [12]	3–6, 7–6^{(7–3)}, 6–1, 7–6^{(7–5)}
Matches on Court Suzanne Lenglen (Grandstand)
Event	Winner	Loser	Score
Men's singles - 3rd round	(Norway) Casper Ruud [4]	(China) Zhang Zhizhen	4–6, 6–4, 6–1, 6–4
Women's singles - 3rd round	(United States) Coco Gauff [6]	Mirra Andreeva [Q]	6–7^{(5–7)}, 6–1, 6–1
Men's singles - 3rd round	(Argentina) Francisco Cerúndolo [23]	(United States) Taylor Fritz [9]	3–6, 6–3, 6–4, 7–5
Women's singles - 3rd round	(Tunisia) Ons Jabeur [7]	(Serbia) Olga Danilović [Q]	4–6, 6–4, 6–2
Matches on Court Simonne Mathieu
Event	Winner	Loser	Score
Men's singles - 3rd round	(Japan) Yoshihito Nishioka [27]	(Brazil) Thiago Seyboth Wild [Q]	3–6, 7–6^{(10–8)}, 2–6, 6–4, 6–0
Women's singles - 3rd round	(Brazil) Beatriz Haddad Maia [14]	Ekaterina Alexandrova [23]	5–7, 6–4, 7–5
Women's singles - 3rd round	(Ukraine) Lesia Tsurenko	(Canada) Bianca Andreescu	6–1, 6–1
Men's singles - 3rd round	(Bulgaria) Grigor Dimitrov [28]	(Germany) Daniel Altmaier	6–4, 6–3, 6–1
Coloured background indicates a night match
Day matches began at 11 am (11:45 am on Court Philippe Chatrier), whilst night match began at 8:15 pm CEST

== Day 8 (4 June) ==
- Seeds out:
  - Men's singles: (Italy) Lorenzo Musetti [17]
  - Women's singles: Daria Kasatkina [9], (Belgium) Elise Mertens [28]
  - Men's doubles: (United Kingdom) Lloyd Glasspool / (Finland) Harri Heliövaara [5]
  - Women's doubles: (France) Kristina Mladenovic / (China) Zhang Shuai [9], (China) Xu Yifan / (China) Yang Zhaoxuan [11], (United States) Asia Muhammad / (Mexico) Giuliana Olmos [12], (Ukraine) Marta Kostyuk / (Romania) Elena-Gabriela Ruse [13], (Japan) Miyu Kato / (Indonesia) Aldila Sutjiadi [16]
- Schedule of play

Matches on main courts
Matches on Court Philippe Chatrier (Center Court)
Event	Winner	Loser	Score
Women's singles - 4th round	Anastasia Pavlyuchenkova [PR]	(Belgium) Elise Mertens [28]	3–6, 7–6^{(7–3)}, 6–3
Men's singles - 4th round	(Serbia) Novak Djokovic [3]	(Peru) Juan Pablo Varillas	6–3, 6–2, 6–2
Men's singles - 4th round	(Spain) Carlos Alcaraz [1]	(Italy) Lorenzo Musetti [17]	6–3, 6–2, 6–2
Women's singles - 4th round	Aryna Sabalenka [2]	(United States) Sloane Stephens	7–6^{(7–5)}, 6–4
Matches on Court Suzanne Lenglen (Grandstand)
Event	Winner	Loser	Score
Men's singles - 4th round	Karen Khachanov [11]	(Italy) Lorenzo Sonego	1–6, 6–4, 7–6^{(9–7)}, 6–1
Women's singles - 4th round	(Czech Republic) Karolína Muchová	Elina Avanesyan [LL]	6–4, 6–3
Women's singles - 4th round	(Ukraine) Elina Svitolina [PR]	Daria Kasatkina [9]	6–4, 7–6^{(7–5)}
Men's singles - 4th round	(Greece) Stefanos Tsitsipas [5]	(Austria) Sebastian Ofner [Q]	7–5, 6–3, 6–0
Matches on Court Simonne Mathieu
Event	Winner	Loser	Score
Women's doubles - 2nd round	(Chinese Taipei) Hsieh Su-wei [PR] (China) Wang Xinyu [PR]	(France) Kristina Mladenovic [9] (China) Zhang Shuai [9]	6–1, 6–4
Men's doubles - 3rd round	(Spain) Marcel Granollers [10] (Argentina) Horacio Zeballos [10]	(Brazil) Marcelo Melo (Australia) John Peers	6–2, 6–3
Women's doubles - 3rd round	(United States) Coco Gauff [2] (United States) Jessica Pegula [2]	(Ukraine) Marta Kostyuk [13] (Romania) Elena-Gabriela Ruse [13]	6–7^{(6–7)}, 6–4, 6–2
Men's doubles - 3rd round	(Germany) Kevin Krawietz [11] (Germany) Tim Pütz [11]	(France) Sadio Doumbia (France) Fabien Reboul	6–4, 7–6^{(7–4)}
Coloured background indicates a night match
Day matches began at 11 am, whilst night match began at 8:15 pm CEST

== Day 9 (5 June) ==
- Seeds out:
  - Men's singles: (Argentina) Francisco Cerúndolo [23], (Japan) Yoshihito Nishioka [27], (Bulgaria) Grigor Dimitrov [28]
  - Men's doubles: (El Salvador) Marcelo Arévalo / (Netherlands) Jean-Julien Rojer [3], (Argentina) Máximo González / (Argentina) Andrés Molteni [14]
  - Women's doubles: (Australia) Storm Hunter / (Belgium) Elise Mertens [3], (United States) Desirae Krawczyk / (Netherlands) Demi Schuurs [5], (Canada) Gabriela Dabrowski / (Brazil) Luisa Stefani [8]
- Schedule of play

Matches on main courts
Matches on Court Philippe Chatrier (Center Court)
Event	Winner	Loser	Score
Women's singles - 4th round	(Tunisia) Ons Jabeur [7]	(United States) Bernarda Pera	6–3, 6–1
Men's singles - 4th round	(Norway) Casper Ruud [4]	(Chile) Nicolás Jarry	7–6^{(7–3)}, 7–5, 7–5
Women's singles - 4th round	(United States) Coco Gauff [6]	(Slovakia) Anna Karolína Schmiedlová	7–5, 6–2
Men's singles - 4th round	(Germany) Alexander Zverev [22]	(Bulgaria) Grigor Dimitrov [28]	6–1, 6–4, 6–3
Matches on Court Suzanne Lenglen (Grandstand)
Event	Winner	Loser	Score
Women's singles - 4th round	(Brazil) Beatriz Haddad Maia [14]	(Spain) Sara Sorribes Tormo [PR]	6–7^{(3–7)}, 6–3, 7–5
Men's singles - 4th round	(Denmark) Holger Rune [6]	(Argentina) Francisco Cerúndolo [23]	7–6^{(7–3)}, 3–6, 6–4, 1–6, 7–6^{(10–7)}
Women's singles - 4th round	(Poland) Iga Świątek [1]	(Ukraine) Lesia Tsurenko	5–1, retired
Men's singles - 4th round	(Argentina) Tomás Martín Etcheverry	(Japan) Yoshihito Nishioka [27]	7–6^{(10–8)}, 6–0, 6–1
Matches on Court Simonne Mathieu
Event	Winner	Loser	Score
Women's doubles - 3rd round	(Chinese Taipei) Chan Hao-ching [14] (Chinese Taipei) Latisha Chan [14]	(France) Alizé Cornet [WC] (France) Diane Parry [WC]	7–5, 5–7, 6–1
Women's doubles - 3rd round	(Chinese Taipei) Hsieh Su-wei [PR] (China) Wang Xinyu [PR]	(United States) Desirae Krawczyk [5] (Netherlands) Demi Schuurs [5]	7–6^{(8–6)}, 6–4
Men's doubles - Quarterfinals	(Belgium) Sander Gillé (Belgium) Joran Vliegen	(Argentina) Máximo González [14] (Argentina) Andrés Molteni [14]	6–4, 7–6^{(7–4)}
Men's doubles - Quarterfinals	(Netherlands) Matwé Middelkoop [12] (Germany) Andreas Mies [12]	(El Salvador) Marcelo Arévalo [3] (Netherlands) Jean-Julien Rojer [3]	7–6^{(8–6)}, 6–1
Coloured background indicates a night match
Day matches began at 11 am, whilst night match began at 8:15 pm CEST

== Day 10 (6 June) ==
- Seeds out:
  - Men's singles: (Greece) Stefanos Tsitsipas [5], Karen Khachanov [11]
  - Men's doubles: (Netherlands) Wesley Koolhof / (United Kingdom) Neal Skupski [1], (Germany) Kevin Krawietz / (Germany) Tim Pütz [11]
  - Mixed doubles: (Ukraine) Marta Kostyuk / (El Salvador) Marcelo Arévalo [7]
- Schedule of play

Matches on main courts
Matches on Court Philippe Chatrier (Center Court)
Event	Winner	Loser	Score
Women's singles - Quarterfinals	(Czech Republic) Karolína Muchová	Anastasia Pavlyuchenkova [PR]	7–5, 6–2
Women's singles - Quarterfinals	Aryna Sabalenka [2]	(Ukraine) Elina Svitolina [PR]	6–4, 6–4
Men's singles - Quarterfinals	(Serbia) Novak Djokovic [3]	Karen Khachanov [11]	4–6, 7–6^{(7–0)}, 6–2, 6–4
Men's singles - Quarterfinals	(Spain) Carlos Alcaraz [1]	(Greece) Stefanos Tsitsipas [5]	6–2, 6–1, 7–6^{(7–5)}
Matches on Court Suzanne Lenglen (Grandstand)
Event	Winner	Loser	Score
Women's doubles - Quarterfinals	(United States) Nicole Melichar-Martinez [6] (Australia) Ellen Perez [6]	(Czech Republic) Marie Bouzková [PR] (Spain) Sara Sorribes Tormo [PR]	7–5, 6–3
Men's doubles - Quarterfinals	(Croatia) Ivan Dodig [4] (United States) Austin Krajicek [4]	(Germany) Kevin Krawietz [11] (Germany) Tim Pütz [11]	7–6^{(8–6)}, 5–7, 6–4
Mixed doubles - Quarterfinals	(Canada) Bianca Andreescu [Alt] (New Zealand) Michael Venus [Alt]	(Ukraine) Marta Kostyuk [7] (El Salvador) Marcelo Arévalo [7]	7–5, 3–6, [10–6]
Women's Legends 1st Round	(France) Nathalie Tauziat (Denmark) Caroline Wozniacki	(Argentina) Gisela Dulko (Argentina) Gabriela Sabatini	6–4, 6–3
Matches on Court Simonne Mathieu
Event	Winner	Loser	Score
Men's doubles - Quarterfinals	(Spain) Marcel Granollers [10] (Argentina) Horacio Zeballos [10]	(Netherlands) Wesley Koolhof [1] (United Kingdom) Neal Skupski [1]	6–3, 7–6^{(7–4)}
Women's doubles - Quarterfinals	(United States) Coco Gauff [2] (United States) Jessica Pegula [2]	(Hungary) Anna Bondár (Belgium) Greet Minnen	6–2, 7–6^{(7–2)}
Mixed doubles - Quarterfinals	(Indonesia) Aldila Sutjiadi (Netherlands) Matwé Middelkoop	(Chinese Taipei) Chan Hao-ching (France) Fabrice Martin	7–5, 6–2
Coloured background indicates a night match
Day matches began at 11 am, whilst night match began at 8:15 pm CEST

== Day 11 (7 June) ==
- Seeds out:
  - Men's singles: (Denmark) Holger Rune [6]
  - Women's singles: (United States) Coco Gauff [6], (Tunisia) Ons Jabeur [7]
  - Women's doubles: (Chinese Taipei) Chan Hao-ching / (Chinese Taipei) Latisha Chan [14], Veronika Kudermetova / Liudmila Samsonova [15]
- Schedule of play

Matches on main courts
Matches on Court Philippe Chatrier (Center Court)
Event	Winner	Loser	Score
Women's singles - Quarterfinals	(Brazil) Beatriz Haddad Maia [14]	(Tunisia) Ons Jabeur [7]	3–6, 7–6^{(7–5)}, 6–1
Women's singles - Quarterfinals	(Poland) Iga Świątek [1]	(United States) Coco Gauff [6]	6–4, 6–2
Men's singles - Quarterfinals	(Germany) Alexander Zverev [22]	(Argentina) Tomás Martín Etcheverry	6–4, 3–6, 6–3, 6–4
Men's singles - Quarterfinals	(Norway) Casper Ruud [4]	(Denmark) Holger Rune [6]	6–1, 6–2, 3–6, 6–3
Matches on Court Suzanne Lenglen (Grandstand)
Event	Winner	Loser	Score
Men's Legends 1st Round	(France) Mansour Bahrami (France) Fabrice Santoro	(France) Guy Forget (France) Henri Leconte	6–2, 7–6^{(8–6)}
Women's Legends 1st Round	(France) Nathalie Dechy (Slovakia) Daniela Hantuchová	(France) Tatiana Golovin (France) Nathalie Tauziat	7–5, 6–1
Mixed Legends 1st Round	(Belgium) Kim Clijsters (France) Arnaud Clément	(Poland) Agnieszka Radwańska (Spain) Sergi Bruguera	7–6^{(7–5)}, 6–4
Matches on Court Simonne Mathieu
Event	Winner	Loser	Score
Mixed doubles - Semifinals	(Japan) Miyu Kato (Germany) Tim Pütz	(Indonesia) Aldila Sutjiadi (Netherlands) Matwé Middelkoop	7–5, 6–0
Mixed doubles - Semifinals	(Canada) Bianca Andreescu [Alt] (New Zealand) Michael Venus [Alt]	(Canada) Gabriela Dabrowski (United States) Nathaniel Lammons	7–6^{(7–5)}, 7–6^{(7–4)}
Women's doubles - Quarterfinals	(Chinese Taipei) Hsieh Su-wei [PR] (China) Wang Xinyu [PR]	Veronika Kudermetova [15] Liudmila Samsonova [15]	6–3, 6–2
Women's doubles - Quarterfinals	(Canada) Leylah Fernandez [10] (United States) Taylor Townsend [10]	(Chinese Taipei) Chan Hao-ching [14] (Chinese Taipei) Latisha Chan [14]	6–3, 6–3
Coloured background indicates a night match
Day matches began at 11 am, whilst night match began at 8:15 pm CEST

== Day 12 (8 June) ==
- Seeds out:
  - Women's singles: Aryna Sabalenka [2], (Brazil) Beatriz Haddad Maia [14]
  - Men's doubles: (Spain) Marcel Granollers / (Argentina) Horacio Zeballos [10], (Netherlands) Matwé Middelkoop / (Germany) Andreas Mies [12]
- Schedule of play

Matches on main courts
Matches on Court Philippe Chatrier (Center Court)
Event	Winner	Loser	Score
Mixed doubles - Final	(Japan) Miyu Kato (Germany) Tim Pütz	(Canada) Bianca Andreescu [Alt] (New Zealand) Michael Venus [Alt]	4–6, 6–4, [10–6]
Women's singles - Semifinals	(Czech Republic) Karolína Muchová	Aryna Sabalenka [2]	7–6^{(7–5)}, 6–7^{(5–7)}, 7–5
Women's singles - Semifinals	(Poland) Iga Świątek [1]	(Brazil) Beatriz Haddad Maia [14]	6–2, 7–6^{(9–7)}
Matches on Court Suzanne Lenglen (Grandstand)
Event	Winner	Loser	Score
Women's Legends 1st Round	(Belgium) Kim Clijsters (Denmark) Caroline Wozniacki	(Italy) Flavia Pennetta (Italy) Francesca Schiavone	6–4, 6–2
Mixed Legends 1st Round	(Argentina) Gabriela Sabatini (Sweden) Mats Wilander	(Argentina) Gisela Dulko (Ukraine) Andrei Medvedev	6–7^{(7–9)}, 6–2, [10–8]
Men's Legends 1st Round	(France) Sébastien Grosjean (France) Cédric Pioline	(United States) Michael Chang (United States) John McEnroe	4–6, 6–4,[10–8]
Matches on Court Simonne Mathieu
Event	Winner	Loser	Score
Men's doubles - Semifinals	(Croatia) Ivan Dodig[4] (United States) Austin Krajicek [4]	(Spain) Marcel Granollers [10] (Argentina) Horacio Zeballos [10]	6–3, 7–6^{(7–3)}
Men's doubles - Semifinals	(Belgium) Sander Gillé (Belgium) Joran Vliegen	(Netherlands) Matwé Middelkoop [12] (Germany) Andreas Mies [12]	6–4, 7–5
Matches began at 11 am (12:00 pm on Court Philippe Chatrier)

== Day 13 (9 June) ==
- Seeds out:
  - Men's singles: (Spain) Carlos Alcaraz [1], (Germany) Alexander Zverev [22]
  - Women's doubles: (United States) Coco Gauff / (United States) Jessica Pegula [2], (United States) Nicole Melichar-Martinez / (Australia) Ellen Perez [6]
- Schedule of play

Matches on main courts
Matches on Court Philippe Chatrier (Center Court)
Event	Winner	Loser	Score
Women's Wheelchair Doubles Semifinals	(Japan) Yui Kamiji [1] (South Africa) Kgothatso Montjane [1]	(Colombia) Angélica Bernal (Japan) Shiori Funamizu	6–1, 6–2
Men's singles - Semifinals	(Serbia) Novak Djokovic [3]	(Spain) Carlos Alcaraz [1]	6–3, 5–7, 6–1, 6–1
Men's singles - Semifinals	(Norway) Casper Ruud [4]	(Germany) Alexander Zverev [22]	6–3, 6–4, 6–0
Matches on Court Suzanne Lenglen (Grandstand)
Event	Winner	Loser	Score
Women's Legends	(United States) Lindsay Davenport (Slovakia) Daniela Hantuchová	(France) Nathalie Dechy (France) Tatiana Golovin	1–6, 6–3, [11–9]
Men's Legends	(Spain) Sergi Bruguera (Sweden) Mats Wilander	(France) Mansour Bahrami (France) Arnaud Clément	6–3, 3–6, [10–7]
Mixed Legends	(Italy) Flavia Pennetta (United States) Michael Chang	(Italy) Francesca Schiavone (France) Henri Leconte	6–2, 6–7^{(7–9)}, [10–4]
Matches on Court Simonne Mathieu
Event	Winner	Loser	Score
Women's doubles - Semifinals	(Canada) Leylah Fernandez [10] (United States) Taylor Townsend [10]	(United States) Coco Gauff [2] (United States) Jessica Pegula [2]	6–0, 6–4
Women's doubles - Semifinals	(Chinese Taipei) Hsieh Su-wei [PR] (China) Wang Xinyu [PR]	(United States) Nicole Melichar-Martinez [6] (Australia) Ellen Perez [6]	6–2, 3–6, 6–3
Matches began at 11 am

== Day 14 (10 June) ==
- Schedule of play

Matches on main courts
Matches on Court Philippe Chatrier (Center Court)
Event	Winner	Loser	Score
Men's Weelchair Singles Final	(Japan) Tokito Oda [2]	(United Kingdom) Alfie Hewett [1]	6–1, 6–4
Women's singles - Final	(Poland) Iga Świątek [1]	(Czech Republic) Karolína Muchová	6–2, 5–7, 6–4
Men's doubles - Final	(Croatia) Ivan Dodig [4] (United States) Austin Krajicek [4]	(Belgium) Sander Gillé (Belgium) Joran Vliegen	6–3, 6–1
Matches on Court Suzanne Lenglen (Grandstand)
Event	Winner	Loser	Score
Women's Legends	(United States) Lindsay Davenport (Poland) Agnieszka Radwańska	(Argentina) Gisela Dulko (Argentina) Gabriela Sabatini	7–6^{(7–4)}, 6–4
Men's Legends	(France) Guy Forget (France) Fabrice Santoro	(France) Henri Leconte (Ukraine) Andrei Medvedev	6–2, 6–2
Mixed Legends	(France) Nathalie Dechy (France) Sébastien Grosjean	(Belgium) Kim Clijsters (France) Cédric Pioline	5–7, 6–2, [10–7]
Matches on Court Simonne Mathieu
Event	Winner	Loser	Score
Girls' singles - Final	Alina Korneeva [3]	(Peru) Lucciana Pérez Alarcón [6]	7–6^{(7–4)}, 6–3
Boys' singles - Final	(Croatia) Dino Prižmić [3]	(Bolivia) Juan Carlos Prado Ángelo [8]	6–1, 6–4
Girls' doubles - Final	(United States) Tyra Caterina Grant [6] (United States) Clervie Ngounoue [6]	Alina Korneeva [1] (Japan) Sara Saito [1]	6–3, 6–2
Matches begin at 11 am

== Day 15 (11 June) ==
- Seeds out:
  - Men's singles: (Norway) Casper Ruud [4]
  - Women's doubles: (Canada) Leylah Fernandez / (United States) Taylor Townsend [10]
- Schedule of play

Matches on main courts
Matches on Court Philippe Chatrier (Center Court)
Event	Winner	Loser	Score
Women's Doubles Final	(Chinese Taipei) Hsieh Su-wei [PR] (China) Wang Xinyu [PR]	(Canada) Leylah Fernandez [10] (United States) Taylor Townsend [10]	1–6, 7–6^{(7–5)}, 6–1
Men's Singles Final	(Serbia) Novak Djokovic [3]	(Norway) Casper Ruud [4]	7–6^{(7–1)}, 6–3, 7–5
Matches on Court Suzanne Lenglen (Grandstand)
Event	Winner	Loser	Score
Men's Legends	(United States) John McEnroe (Sweden) Mats Wilander	(France) Mansour Bahrami (France) Yannick Noah	6–4, 6–4
Matches began at 11:30 am CEST
