= 2023 French Open – Men's singles qualifying =

Men's singles qualifying
- 2023 French Open

Details
- Draw: 128
- Seeds: 32

Events
Singles	men	women		boys	girls
Doubles	men	women	mixed	boys	girls
WC Singles	men	women	quad	boys	girls
WC Doubles	men	women	quad	boys	girls

Qualification
Singles	men	women
- French Open

The 2023 French Open – Men's singles qualifying are a series of tennis matches that take place from 22 to 26 May 2023 to determine the qualifiers for the 2023 French Open – Men's singles, and, if necessary, the lucky losers.

Only 16 out of the 128 qualifiers who compete in this knock-out tournament, secure a main draw place.

== Seeds ==
All seeds per ATP rankings as of 8 May 2023.

1. Aslan Karatsev (qualified)
2. (Germany) Yannick Hanfmann (qualifying competition, lucky loser)
3. (Croatia) Borna Gojo (second round)
4. (Argentina) Juan Manuel Cerúndolo (second round)
5. (Australia) James Duckworth (first round)
6. Pavel Kotov (first round)
7. (Japan) Yosuke Watanuki (second round)
8. (Moldova) Radu Albot (qualified)
9. (Switzerland) Dominic Stricker (qualifying competition, lucky loser)
10. (Ecuador) Emilio Gómez (first round)
11. (Finland) Otto Virtanen (second round)
12. (Italy) Giulio Zeppieri (qualified)
13. (Hungary) Zsombor Piros (first round)
14. (Austria) Sebastian Ofner (qualified)
15. (Argentina) Facundo Bagnis (qualifying competition)
16. (Czech Republic) Tomáš Macháč (first round)
17. (Italy) Francesco Passaro (first round)
18. (Australia) Aleksandar Vukic (second round)
19. (Netherlands) Gijs Brouwer (first round)
20. (Austria) Filip Misolic (second round)
21. (Belgium) Zizou Bergs (second round)
22. (Austria) Jurij Rodionov (qualifying competition, lucky loser)
23. (Slovakia) Norbert Gombos (second round)
24. (Argentina) Facundo Díaz Acosta (qualifying competition, lucky loser)
25. (Hungary) Fábián Marozsán (second round)
26. (Slovakia) Lukáš Klein (second round)
27. (United States) Denis Kudla (first round)
28. (United Kingdom) Liam Broady (second round)
29. (Australia) Rinky Hijikata (first round)
30. (Italy) Raúl Brancaccio (first round)
31. (Slovakia) Jozef Kovalík (first round)
32. (Spain) Pedro Martínez (qualified)

== Qualifiers ==
1. Aslan Karatsev
2. (Sweden) Elias Ymer
3. (Italy) Andrea Vavassori
4. (Serbia) Hamad Medjedovic
5. (United States) Emilio Nava
6. (Argentina) Genaro Alberto Olivieri
7. (Italy) Flavio Cobolli
8. (Moldova) Radu Albot
9. (Argentina) Thiago Agustín Tirante
10. (China) Shang Juncheng
11. (Kazakhstan) Timofey Skatov
12. (Italy) Giulio Zeppieri
13. (Brazil) Thiago Seyboth Wild
14. (Austria) Sebastian Ofner
15. (Spain) Pedro Martínez
16. (France) Lucas Pouille

== Lucky losers ==
1. (Switzerland) Dominic Stricker
2. (Austria) Jurij Rodionov
3. (Argentina) Facundo Díaz Acosta
4. (Germany) Yannick Hanfmann

== Draw ==
Key

- Q = Qualifier
- WC = Wild card
- LL = Lucky loser
- Alt = Alternate
- ITF = ITF entry
- PR = Protected ranking
- SR = Special ranking
- SE = Special exempt
- JE = Junior exempt
- JR = Junior Accelerator Programme entrant
- CO = College Accelerator Programme entrant
- NG = Next Gen Accelerator Program entrant
- w/o = Walkover
- r = Retired
- d = Defaulted

=== First qualifier ===
First round
1	Aslan Karatsev	7^{7}	7^{7}
PR	(France) Pierre-Hugues Herbert	6^{2}	6^{1}
(Dominican Republic) Nick Hardt	6	1	6
WC	(France) Gabriel Debru	2	6	3
(Chinese Taipei) Hsu Yu-hsiou	1	6	1
(United States) Nicolas Moreno de Alboran	6	3	6
(Belgium) Raphaël Collignon	4	6	4
18	(Australia) Aleksandar Vukic	6	4	6

Second round
1	Aslan Karatsev	7	6
(Dominican Republic) Nick Hardt	5	3
(United States) Nicolas Moreno de Alboran	4	7^{7}	6
18	(Australia) Aleksandar Vukic	6	6^{4}	2

Qualifying competition
1	Aslan Karatsev	6	6
(United States) Nicolas Moreno de Alboran	4	3

=== Second qualifier ===
First round
2	(Germany) Yannick Hanfmann	7^{7}	6
(Italy) Mattia Bellucci	6^{3}	4
WC	(France) Térence Atmane	1	2
(Czech Republic) Zdeněk Kolář	6	6
(Australia) Marc Polmans	7	7
WC	(France) Harold Mayot	5	5
(Sweden) Elias Ymer	7^{7}	6
17	(Italy) Francesco Passaro	6^{5}	0

Second round
2	(Germany) Yannick Hanfmann	6	6
(Czech Republic) Zdeněk Kolář	2	4
(Australia) Marc Polmans	5	3
(Sweden) Elias Ymer	7	6

Qualifying competition
2	(Germany) Yannick Hanfmann	3	4
(Sweden) Elias Ymer	6	6

=== Third qualifier ===
First round
3	(Croatia) Borna Gojo	6	4	6
(Bosnia and Herzegovina) Damir Džumhur	0	6	4
(Italy) Luca Nardi	2	7^{7}	5
(Chile) Alejandro Tabilo	6	6^{3}	7
(Italy) Andrea Vavassori	6	7^{7}
WC	(France) Titouan Droguet	3	6^{3}
(France) Enzo Couacaud	6	6^{7}	2
20	(Austria) Filip Misolic	3	7^{9}	6

Second round
3	(Croatia) Borna Gojo	6^{2}	6^{4}
(Chile) Alejandro Tabilo	7^{7}	7^{7}
(Italy) Andrea Vavassori	6	6
20	(Austria) Filip Misolic	4	1

Qualifying competition
(Chile) Alejandro Tabilo	4	4
(Italy) Andrea Vavassori	6	6

=== Fourth qualifier ===
First round
4	(Argentina) Juan Manuel Cerúndolo	7^{7}	6
(United States) Zachary Svajda	6^{4}	3
Ivan Gakhov	6	6^{5}	4
(Serbia) Hamad Medjedovic	2	7^{7}	6
(Austria) Maximilian Neuchrist	6	3	1
(Netherlands) Jesper de Jong	4	6	6
WC	(France) Antoine Ghibaudo	7^{7}	3	1
23	(Slovakia) Norbert Gombos	6^{4}	6	6

Second round
4	(Argentina) Juan Manuel Cerúndolo	3	6	3
(Serbia) Hamad Medjedovic	6	3	6
(Netherlands) Jesper de Jong	6	7
23	(Slovakia) Norbert Gombos	3	5

Qualifying competition
(Serbia) Hamad Medjedovic	0	6	6
(Netherlands) Jesper de Jong	6	2	2

=== Fifth qualifier ===
First round
5	(Australia) James Duckworth	4	6^{2}
(Italy) Riccardo Bonadio	6	7^{7}
(France) Geoffrey Blancaneaux	6	7
(Turkey) Cem İlkel	4	5
(United States) Emilio Nava	6	7^{7}
(Bulgaria) Dimitar Kuzmanov	3	6^{4}
WC	(France) Arthur Géa	6	4	3
28	(United Kingdom) Liam Broady	4	6	6

Second round
(Italy) Riccardo Bonadio	3	2
(France) Geoffrey Blancaneaux	6	6
(United States) Emilio Nava	6	0	6
28	(United Kingdom) Liam Broady	4	6	3

Qualifying competition
(France) Geoffrey Blancaneaux	6	4	3
(United States) Emilio Nava	3	6	6

=== Sixth qualifier ===
First round
6	Pavel Kotov	6	4	6^{7}
(Belgium) Michael Geerts	3	6	7^{10}
(Switzerland) Henri Laaksonen	5	1
(Argentina) Genaro Alberto Olivieri	7	6
(Italy) Francesco Maestrelli	3	4
(Bulgaria) Adrian Andreev	6	6
(Argentina) Juan Pablo Ficovich	6	6
19	(Netherlands) Gijs Brouwer	4	3

Second round
(Belgium) Michael Geerts	2	5
(Argentina) Genaro Alberto Olivieri	6	7
(Bulgaria) Adrian Andreev	6	7
(Argentina) Juan Pablo Ficovich	2	5

Qualifying competition
(Argentina) Genaro Alberto Olivieri	6	5	6
(Bulgaria) Adrian Andreev	1	7	4

=== Seventh qualifier ===
First round
7	(Japan) Yosuke Watanuki	6	0
(Italy) Andrea Pellegrino	2	0^{r}
PR	Egor Gerasimov	3	5
(France) Laurent Lokoli	6	7
WC	(France) Mathys Erhard	4	6	4
(Italy) Flavio Cobolli	6	3	6
(Argentina) Mariano Navone	0	4
26	(Slovakia) Lukáš Klein	6	6

Second round
7	(Japan) Yosuke Watanuki	6	4	3
(France) Laurent Lokoli	4	6	6
(Italy) Flavio Cobolli	6	6
26	(Slovakia) Lukáš Klein	4	4

Qualifying competition
(France) Laurent Lokoli	5	3
(Italy) Flavio Cobolli	7	6

=== Eighth qualifier ===
First round
8	(Moldova) Radu Albot	7	6
(Czech Republic) Vít Kopřiva	5	0
(United Kingdom) Ryan Peniston	6	6
(Turkey) Altuğ Çelikbilek	4	2
(Argentina) Camilo Ugo Carabelli	6	1	6
(Japan) Kaichi Uchida	3	6	3
WC	(France) Sascha Gueymard Wayenburg	6	6
27	(United States) Denis Kudla	4	3

Second round
8	(Moldova) Radu Albot	2	6	6
(United Kingdom) Ryan Peniston	6	2	4
(Argentina) Camilo Ugo Carabelli	6	3	6
WC	(France) Sascha Gueymard Wayenburg	2	6	2

Qualifying competition
8	(Moldova) Radu Albot	6^{2}	6	6
(Argentina) Camilo Ugo Carabelli	7^{7}	4	1

=== Ninth qualifier ===
First round
9	(Switzerland) Dominic Stricker	7^{7}	6
(Netherlands) Jelle Sels	6^{5}	3
(Czech Republic) Dalibor Svrčina	6	6
(Switzerland) Leandro Riedi	4	4
(Belgium) Gauthier Onclin	6	6
(Romania) Nicholas David Ionel	2	3
(Argentina) Thiago Agustín Tirante	6	6
29	(Australia) Rinky Hijikata	3	2

Second round
9	(Switzerland) Dominic Stricker	6	6
(Czech Republic) Dalibor Svrčina	4	1
(Belgium) Gauthier Onclin	1	6	4
(Argentina) Thiago Agustín Tirante	6	3	6

Qualifying competition
9	(Switzerland) Dominic Stricker	3	6	1
(Argentina) Thiago Agustín Tirante	6	1	6

=== Tenth qualifier ===
First round
10	(Ecuador) Emilio Gómez	7^{7}	3	3
Alt	(Argentina) Renzo Olivo	6^{4}	6	6
(Belgium) Joris De Loore	2	4
(Argentina) Andrea Collarini	6	6
(China) Shang Juncheng	6	6
PR	(Uruguay) Pablo Cuevas	3	4
(Australia) Li Tu	3	4
25	(Hungary) Fábián Marozsán	6	6

Second round
Alt	(Argentina) Renzo Olivo	6	7
(Argentina) Andrea Collarini	3	5
(China) Shang Juncheng	6	6
25	(Hungary) Fábián Marozsán	3	3

Qualifying competition
Alt	(Argentina) Renzo Olivo	3	6	3
(China) Shang Juncheng	6	2	6

=== Eleventh qualifier ===
First round
11	(Finland) Otto Virtanen	6	6
(France) Antoine Escoffier	4	4
(Kazakhstan) Timofey Skatov	6	7^{8}
(Canada) Gabriel Diallo	4	6^{6}
(Chinese Taipei) Wu Tung-lin	1	0
(Brazil) Felipe Meligeni Alves	6	6
(Chile) Tomás Barrios Vera	6	7
31	(Slovakia) Jozef Kovalík	3	5

Second round
11	(Finland) Otto Virtanen	6	2	5
(Kazakhstan) Timofey Skatov	4	6	7
(Brazil) Felipe Meligeni Alves	6	6
(Chile) Tomás Barrios Vera	3	3

Qualifying competition
(Kazakhstan) Timofey Skatov	2	7	6
(Brazil) Felipe Meligeni Alves	6	5	3

=== Twelfth qualifier ===
First round
12	(Italy) Giulio Zeppieri	6	6
(Georgia (country)) Nikoloz Basilashvili	4	1
(Portugal) João Sousa	2	6	6^{8}
(Argentina) Santiago Rodríguez Taverna	6	3	7^{10}
(Italy) Lorenzo Giustino	7^{8}	6^{5}	1
(Portugal) Frederico Ferreira Silva	6^{6}	7^{7}	6
(United States) Steve Johnson	4	4
21	(Belgium) Zizou Bergs	6	6

Second round
12	(Italy) Giulio Zeppieri	6	6
(Argentina) Santiago Rodríguez Taverna	3	4
(Portugal) Frederico Ferreira Silva	6	6
21	(Belgium) Zizou Bergs	3	3

Qualifying competition
12	(Italy) Giulio Zeppieri	6	6
(Portugal) Frederico Ferreira Silva	4	1

=== Thirteenth qualifier ===
First round
13	(Hungary) Zsombor Piros	5	6	1
(Germany) Dominik Koepfer	7	2	6
(Argentina) Federico Delbonis	6^{4}	6	7^{10}
(Colombia) Nicolás Mejía	7^{7}	3	6^{0}
(Brazil) Thiago Seyboth Wild	7^{7}	6
(Switzerland) Antoine Bellier	6^{1}	1
(Lithuania) Ričardas Berankis	6	5	6
30	(Italy) Raúl Brancaccio	3	7	2

Second round
(Germany) Dominik Koepfer	6	7^{7}
(Argentina) Federico Delbonis	1	6^{5}
(Brazil) Thiago Seyboth Wild	6	6^{4}	6
(Lithuania) Ričardas Berankis	2	7^{7}	2

Qualifying competition
(Germany) Dominik Koepfer	1	1
(Brazil) Thiago Seyboth Wild	6	6

=== Fourteenth qualifier ===
First round
14	(Austria) Sebastian Ofner	7^{7}	6
(Japan) Rio Noguchi	6^{0}	4
(United Kingdom) Jan Choinski	2	6	2
(Argentina) Nicolás Kicker	6	3	0^{r}
PR	(Australia) Alex Bolt	3	7^{7}	4
(Ukraine) Oleksii Krutykh	6	6^{2}	6
(Italy) Franco Agamenone	5	3
24	(Argentina) Facundo Díaz Acosta	7	6

Second round
14	(Austria) Sebastian Ofner	3	6	6
(United Kingdom) Jan Choinski	6	4	0
(Ukraine) Oleksii Krutykh	5	5
24	(Argentina) Facundo Díaz Acosta	7	7

Qualifying competition
14	(Austria) Sebastian Ofner	7	6
24	(Argentina) Facundo Díaz Acosta	5	3

=== Fifteenth qualifier ===
First round
15	(Argentina) Facundo Bagnis	6	6
(Italy) Luciano Darderi	3	4
(South Korea) Hong Seong-chan	5	4
(Italy) Matteo Gigante	7	6
WC	(France) Dan Added	6	6
(Germany) Maximilian Marterer	4	4
(Belgium) Kimmer Coppejans	3	1
32	(Spain) Pedro Martínez	6	6

Second round
15	(Argentina) Facundo Bagnis	1	6	6
(Italy) Matteo Gigante	6	3	2
WC	(France) Dan Added	6^{8}	2
32	(Spain) Pedro Martínez	7^{10}	6

Qualifying competition
15	(Argentina) Facundo Bagnis	6	5	0
32	(Spain) Pedro Martínez	2	7	6

=== Sixteenth qualifier ===
First round
16	(Czech Republic) Tomáš Macháč	5	3
PR	(France) Lucas Pouille	7	6
(Chinese Taipei) Tseng Chun-hsin	7^{7}	3	6
(Switzerland) Alexander Ritschard	6^{2}	6	3
(Japan) Shintaro Mochizuki	2	6	1
(Austria) Dennis Novak	6	4	6
(United States) Brandon Holt	6^{2}	4
22	(Austria) Jurij Rodionov	7^{7}	6

Second round
PR	(France) Lucas Pouille	5	6	6
(Chinese Taipei) Tseng Chun-hsin	7	3	0
(Austria) Dennis Novak	6	3	4
22	(Austria) Jurij Rodionov	2	6	6

Qualifying competition
PR	(France) Lucas Pouille	1	7	6
22	(Austria) Jurij Rodionov	6	5	0
