= 2023 French Open – Women's singles qualifying =

Women's singles qualifying
- 2023 French Open

Details
- Draw: 128
- Seeds: 32

Events
| Singles | men | women | | boys | girls |
| Doubles | men | women | mixed | boys | girls |
| WC Singles | men | women | quad |
| WC Doubles | men | women | quad |

Qualification
| Singles | men | women |
| ← 2022 · | French Open | · 2024 → |

The 2023 French Open – Women's singles qualifying are a series of tennis matches that take place from 22 to 26 May 2023 to determine the qualifiers for the 2023 French Open – Women's singles, and, if necessary, the lucky losers.

Only 16 out of the 128 entrants, who compete in this knock-out tournament, secure a main draw place.

== Seeds ==
All seeds per WTA rankings as of 8 May 2023.

1. (Colombia) Camila Osorio (qualifying competition, lucky loser)
2. (Italy) Lucrezia Stefanini (first round)
3. (Netherlands) Arantxa Rus (qualified)
4. (Slovenia) Tamara Zidanšek (qualified)
5. (United States) Caroline Dolehide (first round)
6. (Germany) Laura Siegemund (withdrew)
7. (South Korea) Jang Su-jeong (first round)
8. (Switzerland) Viktorija Golubic (first round)
9. (Germany) Tamara Korpatsch (first round)
10. (United States) Elizabeth Mandlik (qualified)
11. (Japan) Nao Hibino (qualifying competition, lucky loser)
12. (China) Yuan Yue (second round)
13. Erika Andreeva (qualifying competition, lucky loser)
14. (Switzerland) Simona Waltert (qualified)
15. Elina Avanesyan (qualifying competition, lucky loser)
16. (Spain) Marina Bassols Ribera (first round)
17. (Denmark) Clara Tauson (qualified)
18. (Spain) Aliona Bolsova (qualifying competition, lucky loser)
19. (Slovakia) Viktória Hrunčáková (qualifying competition, lucky loser)
20. (Slovenia) Kaja Juvan (second round)
21. (Switzerland) Ylena In-Albon (qualified)
22. (Brazil) Laura Pigossi (qualifying competition)
23. (United States) Sofia Kenin (first round)
24. (United Kingdom) Katie Boulter (second round)
25. (Belgium) Greet Minnen (qualifying competition)
26. (United States) Kayla Day (qualified)
27. (Serbia) Olga Danilović (qualified)
28. (United Kingdom) Harriet Dart (second round)
29. (Czech Republic) Brenda Fruhvirtová (qualified)
30. (Japan) Moyuka Uchijima (qualifying competition)
31. Polina Kudermetova (first round)
32. (Germany) Eva Lys (first round)

== Qualifiers ==
1. Mirra Andreeva
2. (United States) Taylor Townsend
3. (Netherlands) Arantxa Rus
4. (Slovenia) Tamara Zidanšek
5. (France) Fiona Ferro
6. (Czech Republic) Sára Bejlek
7. (Czech Republic) Brenda Fruhvirtová
8. (Australia) Storm Hunter
9. (Denmark) Clara Tauson
10. (United States) Elizabeth Mandlik
11. (Switzerland) Ylena In-Albon
12. Iryna Shymanovich
13. (Serbia) Olga Danilović
14. (Switzerland) Simona Waltert
15. (United States) Kayla Day
16. (Ukraine) Dayana Yastremska

== Lucky losers ==
1. (Japan) Nao Hibino
2. Elina Avanesyan
3. (Spain) Aliona Bolsova
4. (Slovakia) Viktória Hrunčáková
5. Erika Andreeva
6. (Colombia) Camila Osorio

== Draw ==
=== Key ===
- Q = Qualifier
- WC = Wild card
- LL = Lucky loser
- Alt = Alternate
- SE = Special exempt
- PR = Protected ranking
- ITF = ITF entry
- JE = Junior exempt
- w/o = Walkover
- r = Retired
- d = Defaulted
- SR = Special ranking

=== First qualifier ===
First round
1 | (Colombia) Camila Osorio | 6 | 6
(Cyprus) Raluca Șerban | 4 | 3
(Mexico) Fernanda Contreras Gómez | 6 | 1 | 3
PR | (Bulgaria) Sesil Karatantcheva | 3 | 6 | 6
(Colombia) Emiliana Arango | 6 | 6
(Japan) Himeno Sakatsume | 4 | 1
Mirra Andreeva | 6 | 6
31 | Polina Kudermetova | 1 | 4

Second round
1 | (Colombia) Camila Osorio | 6 | 6
PR | (Bulgaria) Sesil Karatantcheva | 0 | 1
(Colombia) Emiliana Arango | 0 | 2
Mirra Andreeva | 6 | 6

Qualifying competition
1 | (Colombia) Camila Osorio | 6^{8} | 4
Mirra Andreeva | 7^{10} | 6

=== Second qualifier ===
First round
2 | (Italy) Lucrezia Stefanini | 2 | 1
PR | (Poland) Maja Chwalińska | 6 | 6
Maria Timofeeva | 6 | 6
PR | Marina Melnikova | 2 | 1
(United States) Taylor Townsend | 7^{7} | 6
(Serbia) Natalija Stevanović | 6^{1} | 2
PR | (Switzerland) Susan Bandecchi | 4 | 4
20 | (Slovenia) Kaja Juvan | 6 | 6

Second round
PR | (Poland) Maja Chwalińska | 6 | 2 | 1
Maria Timofeeva | 1 | 6 | 6
(United States) Taylor Townsend | 1 | 6 | 6
20 | (Slovenia) Kaja Juvan | 6 | 3 | 4

Qualifying competition
Maria Timofeeva | 5 | 2
(United States) Taylor Townsend | 7 | 6

=== Third qualifier ===
First round
3 | (Netherlands) Arantxa Rus | 6 | 6
WC | (France) Audrey Albié | 2 | 3
(Czech Republic) Barbora Palicová | 6 | 6
(Japan) Sakura Hosogi | 0 | 4
(India) Ankita Raina | 7 | 5 | 6
WC | (France) Émeline Dartron | 5 | 7 | 2
(Greece) Despina Papamichail | 2 | 2
30 | (Japan) Moyuka Uchijima | 6 | 6

Second round
3 | (Netherlands) Arantxa Rus | 6 | 6
(Czech Republic) Barbora Palicová | 3 | 4
(India) Ankita Raina | 6^{1} | 1
30 | (Japan) Moyuka Uchijima | 7^{7} | 6

Qualifying competition
3 | (Netherlands) Arantxa Rus | 6 | 7^{7}
30 | (Japan) Moyuka Uchijima | 3 | 6^{4}

=== Fourth qualifier ===
First round
4 | (Slovenia) Tamara Zidanšek | 7^{7} | 4 | 6
(Uzbekistan) Nigina Abduraimova | 6^{2} | 6 | 2
(Switzerland) Joanne Züger | 1 | 4
Anastasia Zakharova | 6 | 6
(France) Chloé Paquet | 3 | 6 | 6
(Spain) Rosa Vicens Mas | 6 | 2 | 2
(United States) Robin Montgomery | 1 | 3
18 | (Spain) Aliona Bolsova | 6 | 6

Second round
4 | (Slovenia) Tamara Zidanšek | 3 | 6 | 6
Anastasia Zakharova | 6 | 2 | 2
(France) Chloé Paquet | 4 | 7^{7} | 4
18 | (Spain) Aliona Bolsova | 6 | 6^{2} | 6

Qualifying competition
4 | (Slovenia) Tamara Zidanšek | 6 | 7^{7}
18 | (Spain) Aliona Bolsova | 2 | 6^{4}

=== Fifth qualifier ===
First round
5 | (United States) Caroline Dolehide | 1 | 2
(Argentina) María Lourdes Carlé | 6 | 6
(Australia) Jaimee Fourlis | 6 | 4 | 6
(Andorra) Victoria Jiménez Kasintseva | 4 | 6 | 3
(Spain) Jéssica Bouzas Maneiro | 3 | 6 | 1
WC | (France) Fiona Ferro | 6 | 1 | 6
(Brazil) Carolina Alves | 6 | 3 | 6
32 | (Germany) Eva Lys | 2 | 6 | 3

Second round
(Argentina) María Lourdes Carlé | 4 | 7 | 2
(Australia) Jaimee Fourlis | 6 | 5 | 6
WC | (France) Fiona Ferro | 6 | 7^{7}
(Brazil) Carolina Alves | 0 | 6^{5}

Qualifying competition
(Australia) Jaimee Fourlis | 3 | 6 | 4
WC | (France) Fiona Ferro | 6 | 2 | 6

=== Sixth qualifier ===
First round
Alt | (Netherlands) Arianne Hartono | 7^{7} | 4 | 4
(Czech Republic) Sára Bejlek | 6^{2} | 6 | 6
(Poland) Katarzyna Kawa | 4 | 7 | 1
(Canada) Carol Zhao | 6 | 5 | 6
WC | (France) Loïs Boisson | 6 | 2 | 5
WC | (France) Nina Radovanovic | 1 | 6 | 7
(United Kingdom) Sonay Kartal | 6 | 5 | 4
19 | (Slovakia) Viktória Hrunčáková | 2 | 7 | 6

Second round
(Czech Republic) Sára Bejlek | 6 | 6
(Canada) Carol Zhao | 4 | 1
WC | (France) Nina Radovanovic | 5 | 6^{1}
19 | (Slovakia) Viktória Hrunčáková | 7 | 7^{7}

Qualifying competition
(Czech Republic) Sára Bejlek | 6 | 6
19 | (Slovakia) Viktória Hrunčáková | 4 | 4

=== Seventh qualifier ===
First round
7 | (South Korea) Jang Su-jeong | 4 | 3
(Hungary) Réka Luca Jani | 6 | 6
(Australia) Priscilla Hon | 2 | 6^{6}
(France) Alice Robbe | 6 | 7^{8}
PR | (Liechtenstein) Kathinka von Deichmann | 6 | 6
(Ukraine) Daria Snigur | 1 | 2
(Croatia) Antonia Ružić | 6 | 2 | 6^{10}
29 | (Czech Republic) Brenda Fruhvirtová | 3 | 6 | 7^{12}

Second round
(Hungary) Réka Luca Jani | 6^{4} | 5
(France) Alice Robbe | 7^{7} | 7
PR | (Liechtenstein) Kathinka von Deichmann | 6^{4} | 1
29 | (Czech Republic) Brenda Fruhvirtová | 7^{7} | 6

Qualifying competition
(France) Alice Robbe | 3 | 0
29 | (Czech Republic) Brenda Fruhvirtová | 6 | 6

=== Eighth qualifier ===
First round
8 | (Switzerland) Viktorija Golubic | 4 | 2
(Australia) Storm Hunter | 6 | 6
WC | (France) Alice Tubello | 4 | 6 | 2
(Germany) Mona Barthel | 6 | 1 | 6
(United States) Ashlyn Krueger | 6 | 6
(United Kingdom) Yuriko Miyazaki | 2 | 4
(Italy) Nuria Brancaccio | 2 | 6 | 4
24 | (United Kingdom) Katie Boulter | 6 | 4 | 6

Second round
(Australia) Storm Hunter | 6 | 6
(Germany) Mona Barthel | 3 | 2
(United States) Ashlyn Krueger | 6 | 2 | 7^{10}
24 | (United Kingdom) Katie Boulter | 2 | 6 | 6^{3}

Qualifying competition
(Australia) Storm Hunter | 7^{7} | 7
(United States) Ashlyn Krueger | 6^{3} | 5

=== Ninth qualifier ===
First round
9 | (Germany) Tamara Korpatsch | 5 | 4
(Sweden) Mirjam Björklund | 7 | 6
(France) Harmony Tan | 7 | 0 | 6^{4}
PR | (Slovenia) Polona Hercog | 5 | 6 | 7^{10}
(Croatia) Petra Marčinko | 3 | 6 | 6
(Canada) Katherine Sebov | 6 | 0 | 2
(United Kingdom) Katie Swan | 4 | 2
17 | (Denmark) Clara Tauson | 6 | 6

Second round
(Sweden) Mirjam Björklund | 6 | 6
PR | (Slovenia) Polona Hercog | 0 | 1
(Croatia) Petra Marčinko | 2 | 1
17 | (Denmark) Clara Tauson | 6 | 6

Qualifying competition
(Sweden) Mirjam Björklund | 5 | 7^{7} | 2
17 | (Denmark) Clara Tauson | 7 | 6^{3} | 6

=== Tenth qualifier ===
First round
10 | (United States) Elizabeth Mandlik | 7 | 6
(Switzerland) Céline Naef | 5 | 3
PR | (Australia) Arina Rodionova | 7^{12} | 6
(Croatia) Tara Würth | 6^{10} | 0
(Germany) Noma Noha Akugue | 7 | 4 | 6
WC | (France) Emma Léné | 5 | 6 | 4
PR | Olga Govortsova | 1 | 3
22 | (Brazil) Laura Pigossi | 6 | 6

Second round
10 | (United States) Elizabeth Mandlik | 6 | 4 | 6
PR | (Australia) Arina Rodionova | 1 | 6 | 1
(Germany) Noma Noha Akugue | 6^{2} | 3
22 | (Brazil) Laura Pigossi | 7^{7} | 6

Qualifying competition
10 | (United States) Elizabeth Mandlik | 6 | 2 | 7
22 | (Brazil) Laura Pigossi | 2 | 6 | 5

=== Eleventh qualifier ===
First round
11 | (Japan) Nao Hibino | 4 | 6 | 6
(South Korea) Han Na-lae | 6 | 3 | 1
(Greece) Valentini Grammatikopoulou | 6 | 6
(Austria) Sinja Kraus | 4 | 1
PR | (United Kingdom) Francesca Jones | 6 | 6
(United States) CoCo Vandeweghe | 3 | 3
(Mexico) Marcela Zacarías | 3 | 0
21 | (Switzerland) Ylena In-Albon | 6 | 6

Second round
11 | (Japan) Nao Hibino | 6 | 6
(Greece) Valentini Grammatikopoulou | 1 | 1
PR | (United Kingdom) Francesca Jones | 1^{r}
21 | (Switzerland) Ylena In-Albon | 4

Qualifying competition
11 | (Japan) Nao Hibino | 6 | 2 | 4
21 | (Switzerland) Ylena In-Albon | 1 | 6 | 6

=== Twelfth qualifier ===
First round
12 | (China) Yuan Yue | 6 | 3 | 6
Oksana Selekhmeteva | 1 | 6 | 2
(Japan) Mai Hontama | 7 | 6
(Belgium) Magali Kempen | 5 | 2
Iryna Shymanovich | 6 | 6
(Chinese Taipei) Joanna Garland | 4 | 0
WC | (France) Margaux Rouvroy | 6 | 6
23 | (United States) Sofia Kenin | 4 | 3

Second round
12 | (China) Yuan Yue | 6 | 3 | 2
(Japan) Mai Hontama | 4 | 6 | 6
Iryna Shymanovich | 7^{7} | 7^{7}
WC | (France) Margaux Rouvroy | 6^{0} | 6^{4}

Qualifying competition
(Japan) Mai Hontama | 2 | 6 | 6^{4}
Iryna Shymanovich | 6 | 3 | 7^{10}

=== Thirteenth qualifier ===
First round
13 | Erika Andreeva | 6 | 6
(Belgium) Marie Benoît | 1 | 1
(Latvia) Darja Semeņistaja | 0 | 2
(Australia) Olivia Gadecki | 6 | 6
(Croatia) Ana Konjuh | 3 | 0
(Belgium) Yanina Wickmayer | 6 | 6
(United Kingdom) Heather Watson | 4 | 3
27 | (Serbia) Olga Danilović | 6 | 6

Second round
13 | Erika Andreeva | 6 | 4 | 6
(Australia) Olivia Gadecki | 4 | 6 | 1
(Belgium) Yanina Wickmayer | 3 | 2
27 | (Serbia) Olga Danilović | 6 | 6

Qualifying competition
13 | Erika Andreeva | 2 | 4
27 | (Serbia) Olga Danilović | 6 | 6

=== Fourteenth qualifier ===
First round
14 | (Switzerland) Simona Waltert | 6 | 6
(France) Carole Monnet | 1 | 3
WC | (France) Daphnée Mpetshi Perricard | 1 | 3
Kristina Dmitruk | 6 | 6
(Argentina) Paula Ormaechea | 2 | 2
(France) Elsa Jacquemot | 6 | 6
(United States) Katrina Scott | 3 | 6 | 4
28 | (United Kingdom) Harriet Dart | 6 | 4 | 6

Second round
14 | (Switzerland) Simona Waltert | 7^{8} | 6
Kristina Dmitruk | 6^{6} | 2
(France) Elsa Jacquemot | 1 | 6 | 6
28 | (United Kingdom) Harriet Dart | 6 | 1 | 2

Qualifying competition
14 | (Switzerland) Simona Waltert | 6 | 4 | 6
(France) Elsa Jacquemot | 2 | 6 | 4

=== Fifteenth qualifier ===
First round
15 | Elina Avanesyan | 6 | 6
Darya Astakhova | 1 | 3
(Spain) Leyre Romero Gormaz | 6 | 6^{5} | 4
(Netherlands) Lesley Pattinama Kerkhove | 3 | 7^{7} | 6
(Romania) Miriam Bulgaru | 1 | 6 | 6
Ekaterina Makarova | 6 | 3 | 2
(Slovenia) Dalila Jakupović | 1 | 1
26 | (United States) Kayla Day | 6 | 6

Second round
15 | Elina Avanesyan | 6 | 4 | 6
(Netherlands) Lesley Pattinama Kerkhove | 3 | 6 | 3
(Romania) Miriam Bulgaru | 4 | 1
26 | (United States) Kayla Day | 6 | 6

Qualifying competition
15 | Elina Avanesyan | 7 | 4 | 6^{7}
26 | (United States) Kayla Day | 5 | 6 | 7^{10}

=== Sixteenth qualifier ===
First round
16 | (Spain) Marina Bassols Ribera | 6 | 6^{1} | 0
(United States) Sachia Vickery | 2 | 7^{7} | 6
(Romania) Alexandra Cadanțu-Ignatik | 5 | 3
(Ukraine) Dayana Yastremska | 7 | 6
(Romania) Elena-Gabriela Ruse | 6 | 6
(Romania) Jaqueline Cristian | 3 | 4
(Germany) Katharina Hobgarski | 4 | 2
25 | (Belgium) Greet Minnen | 6 | 6

Second round
(United States) Sachia Vickery | 2 | 7 | 3
(Ukraine) Dayana Yastremska | 6 | 5 | 6
(Romania) Elena-Gabriela Ruse | 4 | 1
25 | (Belgium) Greet Minnen | 6 | 6

Qualifying competition
(Ukraine) Dayana Yastremska | 6 | 2 | 6
25 | (Belgium) Greet Minnen | 3 | 6 | 4
