= 2023 French Open – Women's singles =

Tennis championship in 2023

Women's singles
- 2023 French Open

Final
- Champion: (Poland) Iga Świątek
- Runner-up: (Czech Republic) Karolína Muchová
- Score: 6–2, 5–7, 6–4

Details
- Draw: 128
- Seeds: 32

Events
Singles	men	women		boys	girls
Doubles	men	women	mixed	boys	girls
WC Singles	men	women	quad	boys	girls
WC Doubles	men	women	quad	boys	girls

Qualification
Singles	men	women
- French Open

Defending champion Iga Świątek defeated Karolína Muchová in the final, 6–2, 5–7, 6–4 to win the women's singles tennis title at the 2023 French Open. It was her third French Open title and fourth major title overall. Świątek was the third woman in the Open Era (after Monica Seles and Naomi Osaka) to win her first four major finals, and the youngest to win four majors since Serena Williams in 2002. She was the first player to defend the French Open title since Justine Henin in 2007, and the first to defend any major title since Williams at the 2016 Wimbledon Championships. Świątek retained the world No. 1 singles ranking after Aryna Sabalenka lost in the semifinals.

Beatriz Haddad Maia was the first Brazilian woman in the Open Era to reach the semifinals, and the first at any major since Maria Bueno at the 1968 US Open. As a result, she entered the top 10 of the WTA rankings for the first time, the first Brazilian woman to do so.

12 of the 32 seeds reached the third round, the fewest since the French Open's draw was increased to 32 seeds in 2002. Elina Avanesyan was the first lucky loser to reach the fourth round since Nicole Jagerman in 1988, and the first at any major since María José Gaidano at the 1993 US Open. Ranked No. 333 in the world, Anastasia Pavlyuchenkova was the lowest-ranked player to reach the French Open quarterfinals. With world No. 192 Elina Svitolina also reaching the quarterfinals, this marked the first time that two players ranked outside the top 150 in the world reached the quarterfinals at the same major.

This tournament marked the major debut of future and WTA Finals champion Mirra Andreeva; she lost to Coco Gauff in the third round.

== Seeds ==
1. (Poland) Iga Świątek (champion)
2. Aryna Sabalenka (semifinals)
3. (United States) Jessica Pegula (third round)
4. (Kazakhstan) Elena Rybakina (third round, withdrew)
5. (France) Caroline Garcia (second round)
6. (United States) Coco Gauff (quarterfinals)
7. (Tunisia) Ons Jabeur (quarterfinals)
8. (Greece) Maria Sakkari (first round)
9. Daria Kasatkina (fourth round)
10. (Czech Republic) Petra Kvitová (first round)
11. Veronika Kudermetova (first round)
12. (Switzerland) Belinda Bencic (first round)
13. (Czech Republic) Barbora Krejčíková (first round)
14. (Brazil) Beatriz Haddad Maia (semifinals)
15. Liudmila Samsonova (second round)
16. (Czech Republic) Karolína Plíšková (first round)
17. (Latvia) Jeļena Ostapenko (second round)
18. Victoria Azarenka (first round)
19. (China) Zheng Qinwen (second round)
20. (United States) Madison Keys (second round)
21. (Poland) Magda Linette (first round)
22. (Croatia) Donna Vekić (second round)
23. Ekaterina Alexandrova (third round)
24. Anastasia Potapova (third round)
25. (Ukraine) Anhelina Kalinina (first round)
26. (Italy) Martina Trevisan (first round)
27. (Romania) Irina-Camelia Begu (third round)
28. (Belgium) Elise Mertens (fourth round)
29. (China) Zhang Shuai (first round)
30. (Romania) Sorana Cîrstea (first round)
31. (Czech Republic) Marie Bouzková (first round)
32. (United States) Shelby Rogers (first round)

Click on the seed number of a player to go to their draw section.

== Draw ==
Key

- Q = Qualifier
- WC = Wild card
- LL = Lucky loser
- Alt = Alternate
- ITF = ITF entry
- PR = Protected ranking
- SR = Special ranking
- SE = Special exempt
- JE = Junior exempt
- JR = Junior Accelerator Programme entrant
- CO = College Accelerator Programme entrant
- NG = Next Gen Accelerator Program entrant
- w/o = Walkover
- r = Retired
- d = Defaulted

=== Finals ===
Quarterfinals
1	(Poland) Iga Świątek	6	6
6	(United States) Coco Gauff	4	2
14	(Brazil) Beatriz Haddad Maia	3	7^{7}	6
7	(Tunisia) Ons Jabeur	6	6^{5}	1
(Czech Republic) Karolína Muchová	7	6
PR	Anastasia Pavlyuchenkova	5	2
PR	(Ukraine) Elina Svitolina	4	4
2	Aryna Sabalenka	6	6

Semifinals
1	(Poland) Iga Świątek	6	7^{9}
14	(Brazil) Beatriz Haddad Maia	2	6^{7}
(Czech Republic) Karolína Muchová	7^{7}	6^{5}	7
2	Aryna Sabalenka	6^{5}	7^{7}	5

Final
1	(Poland) Iga Świątek	6	5	6
(Czech Republic) Karolína Muchová	2	7	4

=== Top half ===
==== Section 1 ====
First round
1	(Poland) I Świątek	6	6
(Spain) C Bucșa	4	0
Q	(Switzerland) Y In-Albon	1	4
(United States) C Liu	6	6
(Sweden) R Peterson	6	6
Q	(France) F Ferro	2	0
(China) Xin Wang	6	7^{7}
31	(Czech Republic) M Bouzková	4	6^{5}
18	V Azarenka	6	3	4
(Canada) B Andreescu	2	6	6
LL	E Andreeva	2	6	4
WC	(United States) E Navarro	6	3	6
(China) L Zhu	3	3
(United States) L Davis	6	6
(Ukraine) L Tsurenko	6	6
13	(Czech Republic) B Krejčíková	2	4

Second round
1	(Poland) I Świątek	6	6
(United States) C Liu	4	0
(Sweden) R Peterson	6^{5}	2
(China) Xin Wang	7^{7}	6
(Canada) B Andreescu	6	6
WC	(United States) E Navarro	1	4
(United States) L Davis	3	0^{r}
(Ukraine) L Tsurenko	6	1

Third round
1	(Poland) I Świątek	6	6
(China) Xin Wang	0	0
(Canada) B Andreescu	1	1
(Ukraine) L Tsurenko	6	6

Fourth round
1	(Poland) I Świątek	5
(Ukraine) L Tsurenko	1^{r}

==== Section 2 ====
First round
11	V Kudermetova	3	1
(Slovakia) AK Schmiedlová	6	6
LL	(Spain) A Bolsova	6	6
PR	(Slovakia) K Kučová	2	1
Q	(United States) K Day	7	6
WC	(France) K Mladenovic	5	1
(Estonia) K Kanepi	1	6	1
20	(United States) M Keys	6	3	6
25	(Ukraine) A Kalinina	2	3
WC	(France) D Parry	6	6
Q	M Andreeva	6	6
(United States) A Riske-Amritraj	2	1
Q	(Netherlands) A Rus	2	3
(Austria) J Grabher	6	6
(Spain) R Masarova	6	1	2
6	(United States) C Gauff	3	6	6

Second round
(Slovakia) AK Schmiedlová	6	6
LL	(Spain) A Bolsova	3	4
Q	(United States) K Day	6	4	6
20	(United States) M Keys	2	6	4
WC	(France) D Parry	1	2
Q	M Andreeva	6	6
(Austria) J Grabher	2	3
6	(United States) C Gauff	6	6

Third round
(Slovakia) AK Schmiedlová	6	6
Q	(United States) K Day	1	3
Q	M Andreeva	7^{7}	1	1
6	(United States) C Gauff	6^{5}	6	6

Fourth round
(Slovakia) AK Schmiedlová	5	2
6	(United States) C Gauff	7	6

==== Section 3 ====
First round
4	(Kazakhstan) E Rybakina	6	6
Q	(Czech Republic) B Fruhvirtová	4	2
(Czech Republic) L Nosková	6	2
(Montenegro) D Kovinić	3	1^{r}
WC	(France) C Burel	6^{0}	2
PR	(Spain) S Sorribes Tormo	7^{7}	6
(Croatia) P Martić	3	6	6
32	(United States) S Rogers	6	3	2
23	E Alexandrova	6	2	6
(Bulgaria) V Tomova	1	6	1
LL	(Japan) N Hibino	3	6	4
(Germany) A-L Friedsam	6	3	6
(Canada) R Marino	3	5
D Shnaider	6	7
(Germany) T Maria	0	1
14	(Brazil) B Haddad Maia	6	6

Second round
4	(Kazakhstan) E Rybakina	6	6
(Czech Republic) L Nosková	3	3
PR	(Spain) S Sorribes Tormo	6	6
(Croatia) P Martić	4	1
23	E Alexandrova	6	6
(Germany) A-L Friedsam	2	0
D Shnaider	2	7	4
14	(Brazil) B Haddad Maia	6	5	6

Third round
4	(Kazakhstan) E Rybakina
PR	(Spain) S Sorribes Tormo	w/o
23	E Alexandrova	7	4	5
14	(Brazil) B Haddad Maia	5	6	7

Fourth round
PR	(Spain) S Sorribes Tormo	7^{7}	3	5
14	(Brazil) B Haddad Maia	6^{3}	6	7

==== Section 4 ====
First round
10	(Czech Republic) P Kvitová	3	4
(Italy) E Cocciaretto	6	6
Q	(Switzerland) S Waltert	6	4	6
Q	(United States) E Mandlik	1	6	2
(Estonia) A Kontaveit	6^{6}	2
(United States) B Pera	7^{8}	6
Q	(Ukraine) D Yastremska	2	5
22	(Croatia) D Vekić	6	7
30	(Romania) S Cîrstea	5	6	2
(Italy) J Paolini	7	2	6
Q	(Serbia) O Danilović	6	6
(Ukraine) K Baindl	3	2
WC	(France) S Janicijevic	6	2	1
(France) O Dodin	0	6	6
(Italy) L Bronzetti	4	1
7	(Tunisia) O Jabeur	6	6

Second round
(Italy) E Cocciaretto	6	6
Q	(Switzerland) S Waltert	2	3
(United States) B Pera	3	6	6
22	(Croatia) D Vekić	6	4	3
(Italy) J Paolini	2	5
Q	(Serbia) O Danilović	6	7
(France) O Dodin	2	3
7	(Tunisia) O Jabeur	6	6

Third round
(Italy) E Cocciaretto	4	6^{2}
(United States) B Pera	6	7^{7}
Q	(Serbia) O Danilović	6	4	2
7	(Tunisia) O Jabeur	4	6	6

Fourth round
(United States) B Pera	3	1
7	(Tunisia) O Jabeur	6	6

=== Bottom half ===
==== Section 5 ====
First round
8	(Greece) M Sakkari	6^{5}	5
(Czech Republic) K Muchová	7^{7}	7
(Argentina) N Podoroska	6	6
WC	(France) J Ponchet	0	2
(Italy) S Errani	3	6	6
(Switzerland) J Teichmann	6	4	2
(Hungary) A Bondár	4	2
27	(Romania) I-C Begu	6	6
21	(Poland) M Linette	3	6	3
(Canada) L Fernandez	6	1	6
Q	(Denmark) C Tauson	6	6
A Sasnovich	2	0
WC	(France) L Jeanjean	6	6^{6}	6
WC	(Australia) K Birrell	4	7^{8}	3
LL	E Avanesyan	6	2	6
12	(Switzerland) B Bencic	3	6	4

Second round
(Czech Republic) K Muchová	6	0	6
(Argentina) N Podoroska	3	6	3
(Italy) S Errani	3	0
27	(Romania) I-C Begu	6	6
(Canada) L Fernandez	3	7	4
Q	(Denmark) C Tauson	6	5	6
WC	(France) L Jeanjean	0	5
LL	E Avanesyan	6	7

Third round
(Czech Republic) K Muchová	6	6
27	(Romania) I-C Begu	3	2
Q	(Denmark) C Tauson	6	1	5
LL	E Avanesyan	3	6	7

Fourth round
(Czech Republic) K Muchová	6	6
LL	E Avanesyan	4	3

==== Section 6 ====
First round
15	L Samsonova	6	6
(United States) K Volynets	0	1
PR	A Pavlyuchenkova	6	6
(Czech Republic) L Fruhvirtová	2	2
(Egypt) M Sherif	6	6
(United States) M Brengle	3	1
Q	(United States) T Townsend	1	2
24	A Potapova	6	6
28	(Belgium) E Mertens	6	6
LL	(Slovakia) V Hrunčáková	1	4
LL	(Colombia) C Osorio	3	6	7
(Romania) A Bogdan	6	3	5
(France) A Cornet	3	4
(Italy) C Giorgi	6	6
(United States) D Collins	4	2
3	(United States) J Pegula	6	6

Second round
15	L Samsonova	6	5	5
PR	A Pavlyuchenkova	4	7	7
(Egypt) M Sherif	6	4	1
24	A Potapova	3	6	6
28	(Belgium) E Mertens	6	7^{7}
LL	(Colombia) C Osorio	3	6^{3}
(Italy) C Giorgi	2	0^{r}
3	(United States) J Pegula	6	0

Third round
PR	A Pavlyuchenkova	4	6	6
24	A Potapova	6	3	0
28	(Belgium) E Mertens	6	6
3	(United States) J Pegula	1	3

Fourth round
PR	A Pavlyuchenkova	3	7^{7}	6
28	(Belgium) E Mertens	6	6^{3}	3

==== Section 7 ====
First round
5	(France) C Garcia	7^{7}	4	6
(China) Xiy Wang	6^{4}	6	4
A Blinkova	6	6
(Belgium) Y Bonaventure	2	0
(Spain) N Párrizas Díaz	6	2	4
Q	(Australia) S Hunter	4	6	6
PR	(Ukraine) E Svitolina	6	6
26	(Italy) M Trevisan	2	2
17	(Latvia) J Ostapenko	6	7
(Czech Republic) T Martincová	3	5
(United States) P Stearns	7^{9}	6
(Czech Republic) K Siniaková	6^{7}	2
(Czech Republic) M Vondroušová	6	6
(United States) A Parks	4	0
(Germany) J Niemeier	3	4
9	D Kasatkina	6	6

Second round
5	(France) C Garcia	6	3	5
A Blinkova	4	6	7
Q	(Australia) S Hunter	6	3	1
PR	(Ukraine) E Svitolina	2	6	6
17	(Latvia) J Ostapenko	3	6	2
(United States) P Stearns	6	1	6
(Czech Republic) M Vondroušová	3	4
9	D Kasatkina	6	6

Third round
A Blinkova	6	2	5
PR	(Ukraine) E Svitolina	2	6	7
(United States) P Stearns	0	1
9	D Kasatkina	6	6

Fourth round
PR	(Ukraine) E Svitolina	6	7^{7}
9	D Kasatkina	4	6^{5}

==== Section 8 ====
First round
16	(Czech Republic) Ka Plíšková	0	4
(United States) S Stephens	6	6
V Gracheva	6	2	6
(Hungary) D Gálfi	4	6	1
(Kazakhstan) Y Putintseva	7	7^{7}
(Belgium) M Zanevska	5	6^{3}
Q	(Slovenia) T Zidanšek	3	1
19	(China) Q Zheng	6	6
29	(China) S Zhang	1	1
(Poland) M Fręch	6	6
Q	(Czech Republic) S Bejlek	0	3
K Rakhimova	6	6
(Hungary) P Udvardy	7^{8}	3	1
Q	I Shymanovich	6^{6}	6	6
(Ukraine) M Kostyuk	3	2
2	A Sabalenka	6	6

Second round
(United States) S Stephens	6	6
V Gracheva	2	1
(Kazakhstan) Y Putintseva	6	4	6
19	(China) Q Zheng	3	6	2
(Poland) M Fręch	3	4
K Rakhimova	6	6
Q	I Shymanovich	5	2
2	A Sabalenka	7	6

Third round
(United States) S Stephens	6	3	6
(Kazakhstan) Y Putintseva	3	6	2
K Rakhimova	2	2
2	A Sabalenka	6	6

Fourth round
(United States) S Stephens	6^{5}	4
2	A Sabalenka	7^{7}	6

== Championship match statistics ==
Category	(Poland) Świątek	(Czech Republic) Muchová
1st serve %	55/88 (63%)	50/89 (56%)
1st serve points won	34 of 55 = 62%	26 of 50 = 52%
2nd serve points won	17 of 33 = 52%	18 of 39 = 46%
Total service points won	51 of 88 = 57.95%	44 of 89 = 49.44%
Aces	1	6
Double faults	3	3
Winners	19	30
Unforced errors	27	38
Net points won	10 of 24 = 42%	18 of 28 = 64%
Break points converted	7 of 11 = 64%	5 of 7 = 71%
Return points won	45 of 89 = 51%	37 of 88 = 42%
Total points won	96	81

== Seeded players ==
The following are the seeded players. Seedings are based on WTA rankings as of 22 May 2023. Rankings and points before are as of 29 May 2023.

Because the tournament takes place one week later this year, players are defending points from the 2022 French Open, as well as tournaments that took place during the week of 6 June 2022 ('s-Hertogenbosch, Nottingham, and Valencia WTA 125). Points from the 2022 French Open are listed first in the "Points defending" column.

Seed	Rank	Player	Points before	Points defending	Points earned	Points after	Status
1	1	(Poland) Iga Świątek	8,940	2,000	2,000	8,940	Champion, defeated (Czech Republic) Karolína Muchová
2	2	Aryna Sabalenka	7,541	130+180	780+1	8,012	Semifinals lost to (Czech Republic) Karolína Muchová
3	3	(United States) Jessica Pegula	5,205	430	130	4,905	Third round lost to (Belgium) Elise Mertens (28)
4	4	(Kazakhstan) Elena Rybakina	5,090	130	130	5,090	Third round withdrew due to upper respiratory illness
5	5	(France) Caroline Garcia	5,025	70	70	5,025	Second round lost to Anna Blinkova
6	6	(United States) Coco Gauff	4,305	1,300	430	3,435	Quarterfinals lost to (Poland) Iga Świątek (1)
7	7	(Tunisia) Ons Jabeur	3,541	10	430	3,961	Quarterfinals lost to (Brazil) Beatriz Haddad Maia (14)
8	8	(Greece) Maria Sakkari	3,391	70+60	10+1	3,272	First round lost to (Czech Republic) Karolína Muchová
9	9	Daria Kasatkina	3,275	780	240	2,735	Fourth round lost to (Ukraine) Elina Svitolina (PR)
10	10	(Czech Republic) Petra Kvitová	3,162	70	10	3,102	First round lost to (Italy) Elisabetta Cocciaretto
11	11	Veronika Kudermetova	2,950	430+110	10+100	2,520	First round lost to (Slovakia) Anna Karolína Schmiedlová
12	12	(Switzerland) Belinda Bencic	2,750	130	10	2,630	First round lost to Elina Avanesyan (LL)
13	13	(Czech Republic) Barbora Krejčíková	2,680	10	10	2,680	First round lost to (Ukraine) Lesia Tsurenko
14	14	(Brazil) Beatriz Haddad Maia	2,420	70+280	780+60	2,910	Semifinals lost to (Poland) Iga Świątek (1)
15	15	Liudmila Samsonova	2,236	10	70	2,296	Second round lost to Anastasia Pavlyuchenkova (PR)
16	16	(Czech Republic) Karolína Plíšková	2,160	70	10	2,100	First round lost to (United States) Sloane Stephens
17	17	(Latvia) Jeļena Ostapenko	2,130	70	70	2,130	Second round lost to (United States) Peyton Stearns
18	18	Victoria Azarenka	2,087	130	10	1,967	First round lost to (Canada) Bianca Andreescu
19	19	(China) Zheng Qinwen	1,998	240+160	70+1	1,669	Second round lost to (Kazakhstan) Yulia Putintseva
20	20	(United States) Madison Keys	1,861	240	70	1,691	Second round lost to (United States) Kayla Day (Q)
21	21	(Poland) Magda Linette	1,825	70	10	1,765	First round lost to (Canada) Leylah Fernandez
22	22	(Croatia) Donna Vekić	1,813	110	70	1,773	Second round lost to (United States) Bernarda Pera
23	23	Ekaterina Alexandrova	1,725	70+280	130+30	1,535	Third round lost to (Brazil) Beatriz Haddad Maia (14)
24	25	Anastasia Potapova	1,665	(30)^{†}	130	1,765	Third round lost to Anastasia Pavlyuchenkova (PR)
25	26	(Ukraine) Anhelina Kalinina	1,657	70	10	1,597	First round lost to (France) Diane Parry (WC)
26	24	(Italy) Martina Trevisan	1,667	780	10	897	First round lost to (Ukraine) Elina Svitolina (PR)
27	27	(Romania) Irina-Camelia Begu	1,452	240	130	1,342	Third round lost to (Czech Republic) Karolína Muchová
28	28	(Belgium) Elise Mertens	1,439	240+30	240+15	1,424	Fourth round lost to Anastasia Pavlyuchenkova (PR)
29	31	(China) Zhang Shuai	1,355	10+60	10+29	1,324	First round lost to (Poland) Magdalena Fręch
30	32	(Romania) Sorana Cîrstea	1,327	70	10	1,267	First round lost to (Italy) Jasmine Paolini
31	33	(Czech Republic) Marie Bouzková	1,318	70	10	1,258	First round lost to (China) Wang Xinyu
32	34	(United States) Shelby Rogers	1,303	130+110	10+1	1,074	First round lost to (Croatia) Petra Martić

† The player did not qualify for the main draw in 2022. Points for her 16th best result will be deducted instead.

=== Withdrawn players ===
The following players would have been seeded, but withdrew before the tournament began.

Rank	Player	Points before	Points defending	Points after	Withdrawal reason
29	(Spain) Paula Badosa	1,363	130	1,233	Spine stress fracture

== Other entry information ==
=== Wildcards ===
- (France) Clara Burel
- (Australia) Kimberly Birrell
- (France) Séléna Janicijevic
- (France) Léolia Jeanjean
- (France) Kristina Mladenovic
- (United States) Emma Navarro
- (France) Diane Parry
- (France) Jessika Ponchet

=== Protected ranking ===
- Anastasia Pavlyuchenkova (21)
- (Ukraine) Elina Svitolina (27)
- (Spain) Sara Sorribes Tormo (68)
- (Slovakia) Kristína Kučová (90)

=== Qualifiers ===
- Mirra Andreeva
- (Czech Republic) Sára Bejlek
- (Serbia) Olga Danilović
- (United States) Kayla Day
- (France) Fiona Ferro
- (Czech Republic) Brenda Fruhvirtová
- (Australia) Storm Hunter
- (Switzerland) Ylena In-Albon
- (United States) Elizabeth Mandlik
- (Netherlands) Arantxa Rus
- Iryna Shymanovich
- (Denmark) Clara Tauson
- (United States) Taylor Townsend
- (Switzerland) Simona Waltert
- (Ukraine) Dayana Yastremska
- (Slovenia) Tamara Zidanšek

=== Lucky losers ===
- Erika Andreeva
- Elina Avanesyan
- (Spain) Aliona Bolsova
- (Japan) Nao Hibino
- (Slovakia) Viktória Hrunčáková
- (Colombia) Camila Osorio

=== Withdrawals ===
The entry list was released based on the WTA rankings for the week of 17 April 2023.

- † (Romania) Simona Halep (26) → replaced by (Czech Republic) Tereza Martincová (98)
- ‡ (Belgium) Alison Van Uytvanck (96) → replaced by (France) Océane Dodin (99)
- ‡ (United States) Amanda Anisimova (47) → replaced by (Poland) Magdalena Fręch (100)
- ‡ (United Kingdom) Emma Raducanu (68) → replaced by (Argentina) Nadia Podoroska (102)
- ‡ (Australia) Daria Saville (54 PR) → replaced by (United States) Katie Volynets (103)
- @ (United States) Jennifer Brady (14 PR) → replaced by (Japan) Nao Hibino (LL)
- @ (Romania) Patricia Maria Țig (65 PR) → replaced by Elina Avanesyan (LL)
- @ (Australia) Ajla Tomljanović (36) → replaced by (Spain) Aliona Bolsova (LL)
- @ (Spain) Paula Badosa (31) → replaced by (Slovakia) Viktória Hrunčáková (LL)
- § Anna Kalinskaya (62) → replaced by Erika Andreeva (LL)
- § (United States) Caty McNally (67) → replaced by (Colombia) Camila Osorio (LL)

† – not included on entry list
‡ – withdrew from entry list before qualifying began
@ – withdrew from entry list after qualifying began
§ – withdrew from main draw

Preceded by 2023 Australian Open – Women's singles	Grand Slam women's singles	Succeeded by 2023 Wimbledon Championships – Women's singles
