= 2023 French Open – Women's doubles =

Women's doubles
- 2023 French Open

Final
- Champions: (Chinese Taipei) Hsieh Su-wei (China) Wang Xinyu
- Runners-up: (Canada) Leylah Fernandez (United States) Taylor Townsend
- Score: 1–6, 7–6^{(7–5)}, 6–1

Events
Singles	men	women		boys	girls
Doubles	men	women	mixed	boys	girls
WC Singles	men	women	quad
WC Doubles	men	women	quad
← 2022 ·	French Open	· 2024 →

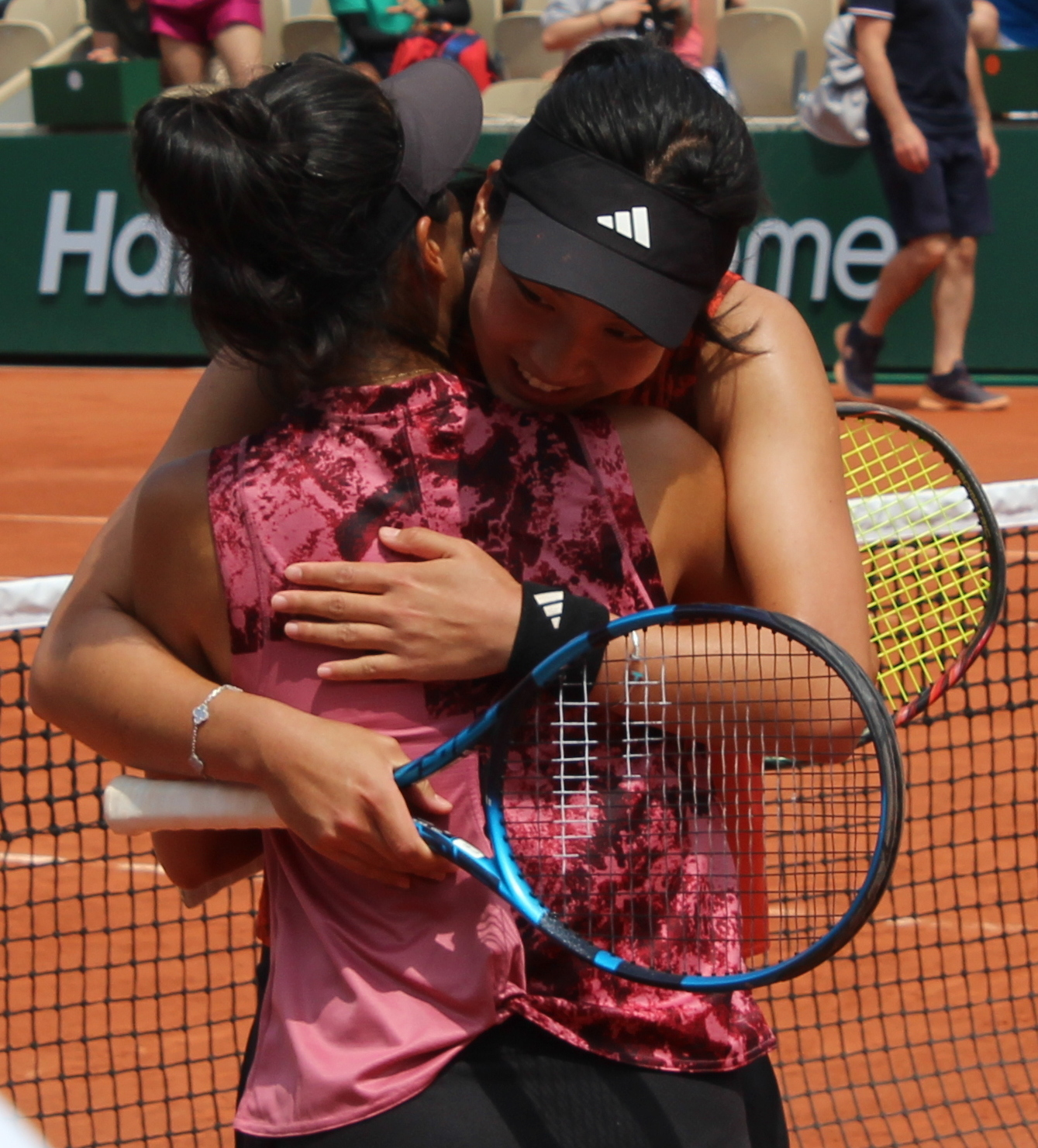
Hsieh Su-wei and Wang Xinyu won the title (pictured after semifinals).

Hsieh Su-wei and Wang Xinyu defeated Leylah Fernandez and Taylor Townsend in the final, 1–6, 7–6^{(7–5)}, 6–1 to win the women's doubles tennis title at the 2023 French Open. It was Hsieh's second French Open title (following 2014), and fifth major title overall; it was Wang's first major title. Fernandez became the first Canadian finalist.

Caroline Garcia and Kristina Mladenovic were the reigning champions, but Garcia chose not to participate. Mladenovic partnered with Zhang Shuai, but lost in the second round to Hsieh and Wang. This loss broke a 19-match win streak for Mladenovic at the tournament, dating back to her loss in the quarterfinals at the 2018 tournament.

Barbora Krejčíková and Kateřina Siniaková were vying for a non-calendar year Grand Slam, but lost in the first round to Ulrikke Eikeri and Eri Hozumi. Siniaková retained the WTA no. 1 doubles ranking after Jessica Pegula lost in the semifinals.

Elise Mertens was attempting to complete the career Grand Slam, but lost in the third round.

== Seeds ==
1. (Czech Republic) Barbora Krejčíková / (Czech Republic) Kateřina Siniaková (first round)
2. (United States) Coco Gauff / (United States) Jessica Pegula (semifinals)
3. (Australia) Storm Hunter / (Belgium) Elise Mertens (third round)
4. (Ukraine) Lyudmyla Kichenok / (Latvia) Jeļena Ostapenko (second round)
5. (United States) Desirae Krawczyk / (Netherlands) Demi Schuurs (third round)
6. (United States) Nicole Melichar-Martinez / (Australia) Ellen Perez (semifinals)
7. (Japan) Shuko Aoyama / (Japan) Ena Shibahara (second round)
8. (Canada) Gabriela Dabrowski / (Brazil) Luisa Stefani (third round)
9. (France) Kristina Mladenovic / (China) Zhang Shuai (second round)
10. (Canada) Leylah Fernandez / (United States) Taylor Townsend (final)
11. (China) Xu Yifan / (China) Yang Zhaoxuan (third round)
12. (United States) Asia Muhammad / (Mexico) Giuliana Olmos (third round)
13. (Ukraine) Marta Kostyuk / (Romania) Elena-Gabriela Ruse (third round)
14. (Chinese Taipei) Chan Hao-ching / (Chinese Taipei) Latisha Chan (quarterfinals)
15. Veronika Kudermetova / Liudmila Samsonova (quarterfinals)
16. (Japan) Miyu Kato / (Indonesia) Aldila Sutjiadi (third round, defaulted)

== Draw ==
=== Key ===
- Q = Qualifier
- WC = Wild card
- LL = Lucky loser
- Alt = Alternate
- SE = Special exempt
- PR = Protected ranking
- ITF = ITF entry
- JE = Junior exempt
- w/o = Walkover
- r = Retired
- d = Defaulted
- SR = Special ranking

=== Finals ===
Quarterfinals
PR	(Czech Republic) Marie Bouzková (Spain) Sara Sorribes Tormo	5	3
6	(United States) Nicole Melichar-Martinez (Australia) Ellen Perez	7	6
15	Veronika Kudermetova; Liudmila Samsonova	3	2
PR	(Chinese Taipei) Hsieh Su-wei (China) Wang Xinyu	6	6
10	(Canada) Leylah Fernandez (United States) Taylor Townsend	6	6
14	(Chinese Taipei) Chan Hao-ching (Chinese Taipei) Latisha Chan	3	3
(Hungary) Anna Bondár (Belgium) Greet Minnen	2	6^{2}
2	(United States) Coco Gauff (United States) Jessica Pegula	6	7^{7}

Semifinals
6	(United States) Nicole Melichar-Martinez (Australia) Ellen Perez	2	6	3
PR	(Chinese Taipei) Hsieh Su-wei (China) Wang Xinyu	6	3	6
10	(Canada) Leylah Fernandez (United States) Taylor Townsend	6	6
2	(United States) Coco Gauff (United States) Jessica Pegula	0	4

Final
PR	(Chinese Taipei) Hsieh Su-wei (China) Wang Xinyu	1	7^{7}	6
10	(Canada) Leylah Fernandez (United States) Taylor Townsend	6	6^{5}	1

=== Top half ===
==== Section 1 ====
First round
1	(Czech Republic) B Krejčíková (Czech Republic) K Siniaková	6	2	2
(Norway) U Eikeri (Japan) E Hozumi	3	6	6
(United States) S Chang (United States) A Kulikov	6	4	2
PR	(Czech Republic) M Bouzková (Spain) S Sorribes Tormo	3	6	6
I Khromacheva (Czech Republic) L Nosková	6	6
A Panova; Y Sizikova	4	4
(United States) C Dolehide (Germany) J Niemeier	2	0
16	(Japan) M Kato (Indonesia) A Sutjiadi	6	6
11	(China) Y Xu (China) Z Yang	7	7
(Canada) R Marino (China) L Zhu	5	5
Alt	(Belgium) Y Bonaventure (Hungary) P Udvardy	7^{7}	6
WC	(France) A Robbe (France) A Tubello	6^{5}	3
(United States) A Parks (United States) P Stearns	6	6
Alt	(Czech Republic) A Dețiuc (Venezuela) A Gámiz	3	4
WC	(France) C Burel (France) C Paquet	2	2
6	(United States) N Melichar-Martinez (Australia) E Perez	6	6

Second round
(Norway) U Eikeri (Japan) E Hozumi	5	2
PR	(Czech Republic) M Bouzková (Spain) S Sorribes Tormo	7	6
I Khromacheva (Czech Republic) L Nosková	4	5
16	(Japan) M Kato (Indonesia) A Sutjiadi	6	7
11	(China) Y Xu (China) Z Yang	4	7^{7}	7^{11}
Alt	(Belgium) Y Bonaventure (Hungary) P Udvardy	6	6^{3}	6^{9}
(United States) A Parks (United States) P Stearns	1	6	3
6	(United States) N Melichar-Martinez (Australia) E Perez	6	4	6

Third round
PR	(Czech Republic) M Bouzková (Spain) S Sorribes Tormo	7^{7}	1
16	(Japan) M Kato (Indonesia) A Sutjiadi	6^{1}	3^{d}
11	(China) Y Xu (China) Z Yang	0	3
6	(United States) N Melichar-Martinez (Australia) E Perez	6	6

Quarterfinals
PR	(Czech Republic) M Bouzková (Spain) S Sorribes Tormo	5	3
6	(United States) N Melichar-Martinez (Australia) E Perez	7	6

==== Section 2 ====
First round
3	(Australia) S Hunter (Belgium) E Mertens	6	6
(United States) D Collins (United States) E Navarro	2	2
(Romania) I-C Begu (Ukraine) A Kalinina	2	4
Alt	(Brazil) I Gamarra Martins; I Shymanovich	6	6
(Czech Republic) M Kolodziejová (Czech Republic) M Vondroušová	2	6	6
WC	(France) E Cascino (France) C Monnet	6	1	1
L Marozava (Spain) R Masarova	7	6^{4}	2
15	V Kudermetova; L Samsonova	5	7^{7}	6
9	(France) K Mladenovic (China) S Zhang	6	6
(Georgia (country)) N Dzalamidze (Bulgaria) V Tomova	2	1
(Kazakhstan) Y Putintseva; K Rakhimova	0	3
PR	(Chinese Taipei) S-w Hsieh (China) Xin Wang	6	6
(Italy) J Paolini (Italy) M Trevisan	7^{7}	1	6
(United Kingdom) A Barnett (United Kingdom) O Nicholls	6^{5}	6	4
(Spain) C Bucșa (Poland) A Rosolska	0	2
5	(United States) D Krawczyk (Netherlands) D Schuurs	6	6

Second round
3	(Australia) S Hunter (Belgium) E Mertens	7^{7}	6
Alt	(Brazil) I Gamarra Martins; I Shymanovich	6^{4}	1
(Czech Republic) M Kolodziejová (Czech Republic) M Vondroušová	6	6^{3}	3
15	V Kudermetova; L Samsonova	2	7^{7}	6
9	(France) K Mladenovic (China) S Zhang	1	4
PR	(Chinese Taipei) S-w Hsieh (China) Xin Wang	6	6
(Italy) J Paolini (Italy) M Trevisan	2	2
5	(United States) D Krawczyk (Netherlands) D Schuurs	6	6

Third round
3	(Australia) S Hunter (Belgium) E Mertens	3	4
15	V Kudermetova; L Samsonova	6	6
PR	(Chinese Taipei) S-w Hsieh (China) Xin Wang	7^{8}	6
5	(United States) D Krawczyk (Netherlands) D Schuurs	6^{6}	4

Quarterfinals
15	V Kudermetova; L Samsonova	3	2
PR	(Chinese Taipei) S-w Hsieh (China) Xin Wang	6	6

=== Bottom half ===
==== Section 3 ====
First round
8	(Canada) G Dabrowski (Brazil) L Stefani	6	6
(Italy) E Cocciaretto (Germany) T Maria	2	2
(Chile) A Guarachi (New Zealand) E Routliffe	2	7	2
Alt	(Hungary) D Gálfi (Poland) K Piter	6	5	6
(Estonia) I Neel (Chinese Taipei) F-h Wu	6^{2}	6	6
(Germany) A-L Friedsam (Ukraine) N Kichenok	7^{7}	4	3
PR	(Italy) S Errani (United States) B Mattek-Sands	5	6^{3}
10	(Canada) L Fernandez (United States) T Townsend	7	7^{7}
14	(Chinese Taipei) H-c Chan (Chinese Taipei) L Chan	6^{5}	7^{7}	6
(Spain) A Bolsova (Georgia (country)) O Kalashnikova	7^{7}	6^{5}	4
(Romania) M Niculescu (Japan) M Ninomiya	1	1
(Hungary) T Babos (Kazakhstan) A Danilina	6	6
WC	(France) A Cornet (France) D Parry	6	6^{6}	6
WC	(France) E Lechemia (France) J Ponchet	4	7^{8}	3
WC	(France) E Jacquemot (France) L Jeanjean	3	1
4	(Ukraine) L Kichenok (Latvia) J Ostapenko	6	6

Second round
8	(Canada) G Dabrowski (Brazil) L Stefani	4	6	7
Alt	(Hungary) D Gálfi (Poland) K Piter	6	2	5
(Estonia) I Neel (Chinese Taipei) F-h Wu	2	1
10	(Canada) L Fernandez (United States) T Townsend	6	6
14	(Chinese Taipei) H-c Chan (Chinese Taipei) L Chan	7^{7}	6
(Hungary) T Babos (Kazakhstan) A Danilina	6^{3}	3
WC	(France) A Cornet (France) D Parry	7	6
4	(Ukraine) L Kichenok (Latvia) J Ostapenko	5	1

Third round
8	(Canada) G Dabrowski (Brazil) L Stefani	4	6	2
10	(Canada) L Fernandez (United States) T Townsend	6	4	6
14	(Chinese Taipei) H-c Chan (Chinese Taipei) L Chan	7	5	6
WC	(France) A Cornet (France) D Parry	5	7	1

Quarterfinals
10	(Canada) L Fernandez (United States) T Townsend	6	6
14	(Chinese Taipei) H-c Chan (Chinese Taipei) L Chan	3	3

==== Section 4 ====
First round
7	(Japan) S Aoyama (Japan) E Shibahara	7	6
E Alexandrova; A Potapova	5	4
(Hungary) A Bondár (Belgium) G Minnen	7	5	6
(Egypt) M Sherif (Slovenia) T Zidanšek	5	7	4
WC	(France) T Andrianjafitrimo (France) F Ferro	3	1
(Belgium) M Zanevska (Belgium) K Zimmermann	6	6
(Romania) A Bogdan (United States) B Pera	6^{4}	4
12	(United States) A Muhammad (Mexico) G Olmos	7^{7}	6
13	(Ukraine) M Kostyuk (Romania) E-G Ruse	6	3	6
A Blinkova; V Gracheva	3	6	2
(Belgium) K Flipkens (United States) S Rogers	6	6
(Spain) N Párrizas Díaz (United States) S Santamaria	1	1
V Azarenka (Brazil) B Haddad Maia	6	6
(Estonia) K Kanepi (Slovakia) T Mihalíková	0	1
(Germany) L Siegemund; V Zvonareva	2	2
2	(United States) C Gauff (United States) J Pegula	6	6

Second round
7	(Japan) S Aoyama (Japan) E Shibahara	4	4
(Hungary) A Bondár (Belgium) G Minnen	6	6
(Belgium) M Zanevska (Belgium) K Zimmermann	4	0
12	(United States) A Muhammad (Mexico) G Olmos	6	6
13	(Ukraine) M Kostyuk (Romania) E-G Ruse	3	6	6
(Belgium) K Flipkens (United States) S Rogers	6	4	3
V Azarenka (Brazil) B Haddad Maia	3	1
2	(United States) C Gauff (United States) J Pegula	6	6

Third round
(Hungary) A Bondár (Belgium) G Minnen	6	1	6
12	(United States) A Muhammad (Mexico) G Olmos	3	6	2
13	(Ukraine) M Kostyuk (Romania) E-G Ruse	7^{7}	4	2
2	(United States) C Gauff (United States) J Pegula	6^{4}	6	6

Quarterfinals
(Hungary) A Bondár (Belgium) G Minnen	2	6^{2}
2	(United States) C Gauff (United States) J Pegula	6	7^{7}

== Seeded teams ==
The following are the seeded teams. Seedings are based on WTA rankings as of 22 May 2023.

Country	Player	Country	Player	Rank	Seed
CZE	Barbora Krejčiková	CZE	Kateřina Siniaková	5	1
USA	Coco Gauff	USA	Jessica Pegula	5	2
AUS	Storm Hunter	BEL	Elise Mertens	11	3
UKR	Lyudmyla Kichenok	LAT	Jeļena Ostapenko	18	4
USA	Desirae Krawczyk	NED	Demi Schuurs	27	5
USA	Nicole Melichar-Martinez	AUS	Ellen Perez	29	6
JPN	Shuko Aoyama	JPN	Ena Shibahara	40	7
CAN	Gabriela Dabrowski	BRA	Luisa Stefani	41	8
FRA	Kristina Mladenovic	CHN	Zhang Shuai	42	9
CAN	Leylah Fernandez	USA	Taylor Townsend	43	10
CHN	Xu Yifan	CHN	Yang Zhaoxuan	46	11
USA	Asia Muhammad	MEX	Giuliana Olmos	52	12
UKR	Marta Kostyuk	ROU	Elena-Gabriela Ruse	61	13
TPE	Chan Hao-ching	TPE	Latisha Chan	62	14
	Veronika Kudermetova		Liudmila Samsonova	63	15
JPN	Miyu Kato	INA	Aldila Sutjiadi	63	16

== Other entry information ==
=== Wildcards ===
- (France) Tessah Andrianjafitrimo / (France) Fiona Ferro
- (France) Clara Burel / (France) Chloé Paquet
- (France) Estelle Cascino / (France) Carole Monnet
- (France) Alizé Cornet / (France) Diane Parry
- (France) Elsa Jacquemot / (France) Léolia Jeanjean
- (France) Elixane Lechemia / (France) Jessika Ponchet
- (France) Alice Robbe / (France) Alice Tubello

=== Protected ranking ===
- (Czech Republic) Marie Bouzková / (Spain) Sara Sorribes Tormo
- (Italy) Sara Errani / (United States) Bethanie Mattek-Sands
- (Chinese Taipei) Hsieh Su-wei / (China) Wang Xinyu

=== Alternates ===
- (Belgium) Ysaline Bonaventure / (Hungary) Panna Udvardy
- (Czech Republic) Anastasia Dețiuc / (Venezuela) Andrea Gámiz
- (Hungary) Dalma Gálfi / (Poland) Katarzyna Piter
- (Brazil) Ingrid Gamarra Martins / Iryna Shymanovich

=== Withdrawals ===
- (Spain) Paula Badosa / (Spain) Nuria Párrizas Díaz → replaced by (Spain) Nuria Párrizas Díaz / (United States) Sabrina Santamaria
- (United States) Lauren Davis / (United States) Claire Liu → replaced by (Hungary) Dalma Gálfi / (Poland) Katarzyna Piter
- (Czech Republic) Linda Fruhvirtová / Aliaksandra Sasnovich → replaced by (Czech Republic) Anastasia Dețiuc / (Venezuela) Andrea Gámiz
- Anna Kalinskaya / (United States) Caty McNally → replaced by (Montenegro) Danka Kovinić / (Sweden) Rebecca Peterson
- (Montenegro) Danka Kovinić / (Sweden) Rebecca Peterson → replaced by (Belgium) Ysaline Bonaventure / (Hungary) Panna Udvardy
- (Poland) Magda Linette / (China) Wang Xiyu → replaced by (Brazil) Ingrid Gamarra Martins / Iryna Shymanovich
- (United States) Sabrina Santamaria / (Romania) Patricia Maria Țig → replaced by (Estonia) Ingrid Neel / (Chinese Taipei) Wu Fang-hsien
