= 2023 French Open – Men's doubles =

Men's doubles
- 2023 French Open

Final
- Champions: (Croatia) Ivan Dodig (United States) Austin Krajicek
- Runners-up: (Belgium) Sander Gillé (Belgium) Joran Vliegen
- Score: 6–3, 6–1

Events
Singles	men	women		boys	girls
Doubles	men	women	mixed	boys	girls
WC Singles	men	women	quad	boys	girls
WC Doubles	men	women	quad	boys	girls
- French Open

Ivan Dodig and Austin Krajicek defeated Sander Gillé and Joran Vliegen in the final, 6–3, 6–1 to win the men's doubles tennis title at the 2023 French Open. It was Dodig's third major men's doubles title and Krajicek's first, and their first major title as a team.

Marcelo Arévalo and Jean-Julien Rojer were the defending champions, but lost in the quarterfinals to Matwé Middelkoop and Andreas Mies.

Krajicek overtook Wesley Koolhof and Neal Skupski for the individual men's doubles world No. 1 ranking. Rajeev Ram, Lloyd Glasspool, Harri Heliövaara, and Jan Zieliński were also in contention for the top ranking at the beginning of the tournament.

Mate Pavić was vying to complete the career Golden Slam, but lost in the first round.

== Seeds ==
1. (Netherlands) Wesley Koolhof / (United Kingdom) Neal Skupski (quarterfinals)
2. (United States) Rajeev Ram / (United Kingdom) Joe Salisbury (third round)
3. (El Salvador) Marcelo Arévalo / (Netherlands) Jean-Julien Rojer (quarterfinals)
4. (Croatia) Ivan Dodig / (United States) Austin Krajicek (champions)
5. (United Kingdom) Lloyd Glasspool / (Finland) Harri Heliövaara (third round)
6. (India) Rohan Bopanna / (Australia) Matthew Ebden (first round)
7. (Monaco) Hugo Nys / (Poland) Jan Zieliński (second round)
8. (Croatia) Nikola Mektić / (Croatia) Mate Pavić (first round)
9. (Mexico) Santiago González / (France) Édouard Roger-Vasselin (third round)
10. (Spain) Marcel Granollers / (Argentina) Horacio Zeballos (semifinals)
11. (Germany) Kevin Krawietz / (Germany) Tim Pütz (quarterfinals)
12. (Netherlands) Matwé Middelkoop / (Germany) Andreas Mies (semifinals)
13. (United Kingdom) Jamie Murray / (New Zealand) Michael Venus (third round)
14. (Argentina) Máximo González / (Argentina) Andrés Molteni (quarterfinals)
15. (Australia) Rinky Hijikata / (Australia) Jason Kubler (first round)
16. (United States) Nathaniel Lammons / (United States) Jackson Withrow (first round)

Click on the seed number of a player to go to their draw section.

== Draw ==
Key

- Q = Qualifier
- WC = Wild card
- LL = Lucky loser
- Alt = Alternate
- ITF = ITF entry
- PR = Protected ranking
- SR = Special ranking
- SE = Special exempt
- JE = Junior exempt
- JR = Junior Accelerator Programme entrant
- CO = College Accelerator Programme entrant
- NG = Next Gen Accelerator Program entrant
- w/o = Walkover
- r = Retired
- d = Defaulted

=== Finals ===
Quarterfinals
1	(Netherlands) Wesley Koolhof (United Kingdom) Neal Skupski	3	6^{4}
10	(Spain) Marcel Granollers (Argentina) Horacio Zeballos	6	7^{7}
4	(Croatia) Ivan Dodig (United States) Austin Krajicek	7^{8}	5	6
11	(Germany) Kevin Krawietz (Germany) Tim Pütz	6^{6}	7	4
12	(Netherlands) Matwé Middelkoop (Germany) Andreas Mies	7^{8}	6
3	(El Salvador) Marcelo Arévalo (Netherlands) Jean-Julien Rojer	6^{6}	1
(Belgium) Sander Gillé (Belgium) Joran Vliegen	6	7^{7}
14	(Argentina) Máximo González (Argentina) Andrés Molteni	4	6^{4}

Semifinals
10	(Spain) Marcel Granollers (Argentina) Horacio Zeballos	3	6^{3}
4	(Croatia) Ivan Dodig (United States) Austin Krajicek	6	7^{7}
12	(Netherlands) Matwé Middelkoop (Germany) Andreas Mies	4	5
(Belgium) Sander Gillé (Belgium) Joran Vliegen	6	7

Final
4	(Croatia) Ivan Dodig (United States) Austin Krajicek	6	6
(Belgium) Sander Gillé (Belgium) Joran Vliegen	3	1

=== Top half ===
==== Section 1 ====
First round
1	(Netherlands) W Koolhof (United Kingdom) N Skupski	6	7^{7}
(Ecuador) G Escobar (Kazakhstan) A Golubev	3	6^{5}
(Argentina) P Cachin (China) Y Wu	4	6	6
WC	(France) S Gueymard Wayenburg (France) L Van Assche	6	4	1
(Spain) A Ramos Viñolas (Spain) B Zapata Miralles	1	6^{6}
(Uruguay) A Behar (Czech Republic) A Pavlásek	6	7^{8}
(Kazakhstan) A Nedovyesov (Mexico) MÁ Reyes-Varela	3	6	6
16	(United States) N Lammons (United States) J Withrow	6	1	4
10	(Spain) M Granollers (Argentina) H Zeballos	6	6
Alt	(Netherlands) T Griekspoor (Netherlands) B Stevens	2	3
(Australia) T Kokkinakis (Germany) J-L Struff	6^{1}	6	3
(Italy) S Bolelli (Italy) F Fognini	7^{7}	3	6
(Brazil) M Melo (Australia) J Peers	5	6	6
(United States) W Blumberg (Serbia) M Kecmanović	7	3	4
WC	(France) R Gasquet (France) L Pouille	4	2
7	(Monaco) H Nys (Poland) J Zieliński	6	6

Second round
1	(Netherlands) W Koolhof (United Kingdom) N Skupski	6	6
(Argentina) P Cachin (China) Y Wu	4	2
(Uruguay) A Behar (Czech Republic) A Pavlásek	4	6	1
(Kazakhstan) A Nedovyesov (Mexico) MÁ Reyes-Varela	6	1	6
10	(Spain) M Granollers (Argentina) H Zeballos	6	6
(Italy) S Bolelli (Italy) F Fognini	0	3
(Brazil) M Melo (Australia) J Peers	7^{7}	6
7	(Monaco) H Nys (Poland) J Zieliński	6^{5}	4

Third round
1	(Netherlands) W Koolhof (United Kingdom) N Skupski	7	6
(Kazakhstan) A Nedovyesov (Mexico) MÁ Reyes-Varela	5	4
10	(Spain) M Granollers (Argentina) H Zeballos	6	6
(Brazil) M Melo (Australia) J Peers	2	3

Quarterfinals
1	(Netherlands) W Koolhof (United Kingdom) N Skupski	3	6^{4}
10	(Spain) M Granollers (Argentina) H Zeballos	6	7^{7}

==== Section 2 ====
First round
4	(Croatia) I Dodig (United States) A Krajicek	7^{7}	3	7^{10}
(Argentina) S Báez (Argentina) G Durán	6^{3}	6	6^{4}
(Switzerland) M-A Hüsler (Chile) N Jarry	6	6^{4}	6
(Brazil) M Demoliner (Italy) A Vavassori	3	7^{7}	3
(Australia) M Purcell (United States) B Shelton	3	6	6
(United Kingdom) J Cash (United Kingdom) H Patten	6	3	4
(Portugal) F Cabral (Brazil) R Matos	7^{7}	7^{7}
15	(Australia) R Hijikata (Australia) J Kubler	6^{4}	6^{5}
11	(Germany) K Krawietz (Germany) T Pütz	7	6
Alt	(Romania) VV Cornea (China) Z Zhang	5	4
(Monaco) R Arneodo (Austria) S Weissborn	3	7^{7}	7^{10}
(Netherlands) R Haase (Austria) P Oswald	6	6^{4}	6^{8}
WC	(France) A Fils (France) G Mpetshi Perricard	3	6	4
WC	(France) T Arribagé (France) L Sanchez	6	3	6
(France) S Doumbia (France) F Reboul	7	7^{7}
6	(India) R Bopanna (Australia) M Ebden	5	6^{5}

Second round
4	(Croatia) I Dodig (United States) A Krajicek	7	6
(Switzerland) M-A Hüsler (Chile) N Jarry	5	2
(Australia) M Purcell (United States) B Shelton	3	0
(Portugal) F Cabral (Brazil) R Matos	6	6
11	(Germany) K Krawietz (Germany) T Pütz	6	6
(Monaco) R Arneodo (Austria) S Weissborn	4	2
WC	(France) T Arribagé (France) L Sanchez	2	4
(France) S Doumbia (France) F Reboul	6	6

Third round
4	(Croatia) I Dodig (United States) A Krajicek	6^{3}	6	7
(Portugal) F Cabral (Brazil) R Matos	7^{7}	4	5
11	(Germany) K Krawietz (Germany) T Pütz	6	7^{7}
(France) S Doumbia (France) F Reboul	4	6^{4}

Quarterfinals
4	(Croatia) I Dodig (United States) A Krajicek	7^{8}	5	6
11	(Germany) K Krawietz (Germany) T Pütz	6^{6}	7	4

=== Bottom half ===
==== Section 3 ====
First round
5	(United Kingdom) L Glasspool (Finland) H Heliövaara	7^{7}	4	6
(Austria) A Erler (Austria) L Miedler	6^{3}	6	3
Alt	(India) S Balaji (India) J Nedunchezhiyan	3	4
I Ivashka (Australia) A Popyrin	6	6
WC	(France) J Eysseric (France) H Mayot	7^{7}	6
Alt	(United States) C Eubanks (Australia) J-P Smith	6^{1}	0
(Kazakhstan) A Bublik (Hungary) M Fucsovics	3	1
12	(Netherlands) M Middelkoop (Germany) A Mies	6	6
13	(United Kingdom) J Murray (New Zealand) M Venus	7^{7}	6
(Ecuador) D Hidalgo (Spain) D Vega Hernández	6^{5}	4
(Argentina) G Andreozzi (Argentina) TM Etcheverry	3	4
(Colombia) JS Cabal (Colombia) R Farah	6	6
WC	(France) D Added (France) A Olivetti	6	3	4
(Colombia) N Barrientos (United States) R Galloway	4	6	6
(Greece) Pe Tsitsipas (Greece) S Tsitsipas	3	6	6^{6}
3	(El Salvador) M Arévalo (Netherlands) J-J Rojer	6	3	7^{10}

Second round
5	(United Kingdom) L Glasspool (Finland) H Heliövaara	7^{7}	7
I Ivashka (Australia) A Popyrin	6^{3}	5
WC	(France) J Eysseric (France) H Mayot	5	3
12	(Netherlands) M Middelkoop (Germany) A Mies	7	6
13	(United Kingdom) J Murray (New Zealand) M Venus	6	7
(Colombia) JS Cabal (Colombia) R Farah	1	5
(Colombia) N Barrientos (United States) R Galloway	2	2
3	(El Salvador) M Arévalo (Netherlands) J-J Rojer	6	6

Third round
5	(United Kingdom) L Glasspool (Finland) H Heliövaara	4	2
12	(Netherlands) M Middelkoop (Germany) A Mies	6	6
13	(United Kingdom) J Murray (New Zealand) M Venus	2	2
3	(El Salvador) M Arévalo (Netherlands) J-J Rojer	6	6

Quarterfinals
12	(Netherlands) M Middelkoop (Germany) A Mies	7^{8}	6
3	(El Salvador) M Arévalo (Netherlands) J-J Rojer	6^{6}	1

==== Section 4 ====
First round
8	(Croatia) N Mektić (Croatia) M Pavić	5	3
(Belgium) S Gillé (Belgium) J Vliegen	7	6
Alt	(Czech Republic) R Jebavý (Venezuela) LD Martínez	6	7
Alt	(Brazil) T Monteiro (Peru) JP Varillas	2	5
WC	(France) E Couacaud (France) A Rinderknech	3	2
(India) Y Bhambri (India) S Myneni	6	6
(Sweden) A Göransson (Japan) B McLachlan	2	2
9	(Mexico) S González (France) É Roger-Vasselin	6	6
14	(Argentina) M González (Argentina) A Molteni	6	5	7^{10}
(France) J Chardy (France) F Martin	4	7	6^{8}
PR	(France) P-H Herbert (France) N Mahut	7	3	6^{6}
(United States) M Giron (United States) M McDonald	5	6	7^{10}
PR	(South Africa) L Harris (South Africa) R Klaasen	5	2
(Spain) R Carballés Baena (Spain) J Munar	7	6
PR	(Bolivia) H Dellien (Argentina) G Pella	6	1	4
2	(United States) R Ram (United Kingdom) J Salisbury	2	6	6

Second round
(Belgium) S Gillé (Belgium) J Vliegen	6	6
Alt	(Czech Republic) R Jebavý (Venezuela) LD Martínez	1	2
(India) Y Bhambri (India) S Myneni	4	5
9	(Mexico) S González (France) É Roger-Vasselin	6	7
14	(Argentina) M González (Argentina) A Molteni	7^{7}	1	6
(United States) M Giron (United States) M McDonald	6^{1}	6	2
(Spain) R Carballés Baena (Spain) J Munar	2^{r}
2	(United States) R Ram (United Kingdom) J Salisbury	3

Third round
(Belgium) S Gillé (Belgium) J Vliegen	7	6^{3}	7^{10}
9	(Mexico) S González (France) É Roger-Vasselin	5	7^{7}	6^{5}
14	(Argentina) M González (Argentina) A Molteni	6	4	6
2	(United States) R Ram (United Kingdom) J Salisbury	1	6	4

Quarterfinals
(Belgium) S Gillé (Belgium) J Vliegen	6	7^{7}
14	(Argentina) M González (Argentina) A Molteni	4	6^{4}

== Seeded teams ==
The following are the seeded teams. Seedings are based on ATP rankings as of 22 May 2023.

Country	Player	Country	Player	Rank	Seed
NED	Wesley Koolhof	GBR	Neal Skupski	2	1
USA	Rajeev Ram	GBR	Joe Salisbury	7	2
ESA	Marcelo Arévalo	NED	Jean-Julien Rojer	12	3
CRO	Ivan Dodig	USA	Austin Krajicek	13	4
GBR	Lloyd Glasspool	FIN	Harri Heliövaara	20	5
IND	Rohan Bopanna	AUS	Matthew Ebden	26	6
MON	Hugo Nys	POL	Jan Zieliński	26	7
CRO	Nikola Mektic	CRO	Mate Pavić	28	8
MEX	Santiago González	FRA	Édouard Roger-Vasselin	34	9
ESP	Marcel Granollers	ARG	Horacio Zeballos	42	10
GER	Kevin Krawietz	GER	Tim Pütz	49	11
NED	Matwé Middelkoop	GER	Andreas Mies	52	12
GBR	Jamie Murray	NZL	Michael Venus	55	13
ARG	Máximo González	ARG	Andrés Molteni	55	14
AUS	Rinky Hijikata	AUS	Jason Kubler	60	15
USA	Nathaniel Lammons	USA	Jackson Withrow	63	16

== Other entry information ==
=== Wildcards ===
- (France) Dan Added / (France) Albano Olivetti
- (France) Théo Arribagé / (France) Luca Sanchez
- (France) Enzo Couacaud / (France) Arthur Rinderknech
- (France) Jonathan Eysseric / (France) Harold Mayot
- (France) Arthur Fils / (France) Giovanni Mpetshi Perricard
- (France) Richard Gasquet / (France) Lucas Pouille
- (France) Sascha Gueymard Wayenburg / (France) Luca Van Assche

=== Protected ranking ===
- (Bolivia) Hugo Dellien / (Argentina) Guido Pella
- (South Africa) Lloyd Harris / (South Africa) Raven Klaasen
- (France) Pierre-Hugues Herbert / (France) Nicolas Mahut

=== Alternates ===
- (India) Sriram Balaji / (India) Jeevan Nedunchezhiyan
- (Romania) Victor Vlad Cornea / (China) Zhang Zhizhen
- (United States) Christopher Eubanks / (Australia) John-Patrick Smith
- (Netherlands) Tallon Griekspoor / (Netherlands) Bart Stevens
- (Czech Republic) Roman Jebavý / (Venezuela) Luis David Martínez
- (Brazil) Thiago Monteiro / (Peru) Juan Pablo Varillas

=== Withdrawals ===
- (France) Grégoire Barrère / (France) Quentin Halys → replaced by (Brazil) Thiago Monteiro / (Peru) Juan Pablo Varillas
- (Serbia) Nikola Ćaćić / (Serbia) Dušan Lajović → replaced by (Romania) Victor Vlad Cornea / (China) Zhang Zhizhen
- (Argentina) Francisco Cerúndolo / (Argentina) Federico Coria → replaced by (India) Sriram Balaji / (India) Jeevan Nedunchezhiyan
- (United States) Maxime Cressy / (France) Adrian Mannarino → replaced by (Netherlands) Tallon Griekspoor / (Netherlands) Bart Stevens
- (Finland) Patrik Niklas-Salminen / (Finland) Emil Ruusuvuori → replaced by (Czech Republic) Roman Jebavý / (Venezuela) Luis David Martínez
- (Japan) Yoshihito Nishioka / (Czech Republic) Jiří Veselý → replaced by (United States) Christopher Eubanks / (Australia) John-Patrick Smith
