= 2023 French Open – Mixed doubles =

Mixed doubles
- 2023 French Open

Final
- Champions: (Japan) Miyu Kato (Germany) Tim Pütz
- Runners-up: (Canada) Bianca Andreescu (New Zealand) Michael Venus
- Score: 4–6, 6–4, [10–6]

Details
- Draw: 32
- Seeds: 8

Events
Singles	men	women		boys	girls
Doubles	men	women	mixed	boys	girls
WC Singles	men	women	quad
WC Doubles	men	women	quad
- French Open

Miyu Kato and Tim Pütz defeated Bianca Andreescu and Michael Venus in the final, 4–6, 6–4, [10–6] to win the mixed doubles tennis title at the 2023 French Open. Pütz became the first German male champion at the event; Venus became the first New Zealander finalist.

Ena Shibahara and Wesley Koolhof were the reigning champions, but Koolhof chose not to participate. Shibahara partnered with Jackson Withrow, but lost in the first round to Lyudmyla Kichenok and Matthew Ebden.

== Seeds ==
1. (United States) Jessica Pegula / (United States) Austin Krajicek (first round)
2. (United States) Desirae Krawczyk / (United Kingdom) Joe Salisbury (first round)
3. (Mexico) Giuliana Olmos / (United Kingdom) Neal Skupski (second round)
4. (Netherlands) Demi Schuurs / (Netherlands) Jean-Julien Rojer (first round)
5. (Ukraine) Lyudmyla Kichenok / (Australia) Matthew Ebden (second round)
6. (Australia) Ellen Perez / (Poland) Jan Zieliński (first round)
7. (Ukraine) Marta Kostyuk / (El Salvador) Marcelo Arévalo (quarterfinals)
8. (China) Zhang Shuai / (Croatia) Ivan Dodig (second round)

== Draw ==
Key

- Q = Qualifier
- WC = Wild card
- LL = Lucky loser
- Alt = Alternate
- ITF = ITF entry
- PR = Protected ranking
- SR = Special ranking
- SE = Special exempt
- JE = Junior exempt
- JR = Junior Accelerator Programme entrant
- CO = College Accelerator Programme entrant
- NG = Next Gen Accelerator Program entrant
- w/o = Walkover
- r = Retired
- d = Defaulted

=== Finals ===
Semifinals
(Japan) Miyu Kato (Germany) Tim Pütz	7	6
(Indonesia) Aldila Sutjiadi (Netherlands) Matwé Middelkoop	5	0
Alt	(Canada) Bianca Andreescu (New Zealand) Michael Venus	7^{7}	7^{7}
(Canada) Gabriela Dabrowski (United States) Nathaniel Lammons	6^{5}	6^{4}

Final
(Japan) Miyu Kato (Germany) Tim Pütz	4	6	[10]
Alt	(Canada) Bianca Andreescu (New Zealand) Michael Venus	6	4	[6]

=== Top half ===
First round
1	(United States) J Pegula (United States) A Krajicek	7	3	[7]
WC	(France) E Lechemia (France) A Olivetti	5	6	[10]
WC	(France) C Burel (France) H Gaston	3	2
(Japan) M Kato (Germany) T Pütz	6	6
(Brazil) L Stefani (Brazil) R Matos	6	6^{5}	[15]
WC	(France) D Parry (France) H Mayot	3	7^{7}	[13]
WC	(France) A Cornet (France) É Roger-Vasselin	5	6	[6]
8	(China) S Zhang (Croatia) I Dodig	7	3	[10]
3	(Mexico) G Olmos (United Kingdom) N Skupski	6	6
(Kazakhstan) A Danilina (Mexico) S González	3	2
(Indonesia) A Sutjiadi (Netherlands) M Middelkoop	6	6
(Chinese Taipei) L Chan (Monaco) H Nys	3	3
PR	(Chinese Taipei) S-w Hsieh (France) N Mahut	6	1	[14]
(Latvia) J Ostapenko (Spain) D Vega Hernández	4	6	[12]
(Chinese Taipei) H-c Chan (France) F Martin	6	6
6	(Australia) E Perez (Poland) J Zieliński	2	2

Second round
WC	(France) E Lechemia (France) A Olivetti	4	4
(Japan) M Kato (Germany) T Pütz	6	6
(Brazil) L Stefani (Brazil) R Matos	6	6
8	(China) S Zhang (Croatia) I Dodig	2	2
3	(Mexico) G Olmos (United Kingdom) N Skupski	2	6^{7}
(Indonesia) A Sutjiadi (Netherlands) M Middelkoop	6	7^{9}
PR	(Chinese Taipei) S-w Hsieh (France) N Mahut	4	6	[6]
(Chinese Taipei) H-c Chan (France) F Martin	6	3	[10]

Quarterfinals
(Japan) M Kato (Germany) T Pütz	7^{7}	6
(Brazil) L Stefani (Brazil) R Matos	6^{5}	2
(Indonesia) A Sutjiadi (Netherlands) M Middelkoop	7	6
(Chinese Taipei) H-c Chan (France) F Martin	5	2

Semifinals
(Japan) M Kato (Germany) T Pütz	7	6
(Indonesia) A Sutjiadi (Netherlands) M Middelkoop	5	0

=== Bottom half ===
First round
7	(Ukraine) M Kostyuk (El Salvador) M Arévalo	6	6
V Zvonareva (Argentina) A Molteni	2	4
WC	(France) L Jeanjean (France) J Eysseric	3	2
(Australia) S Hunter (Australia) J Peers	6	6
(United States) N Melichar-Martinez (Germany) K Krawietz	6	1	[8]
Alt	(Canada) B Andreescu (New Zealand) M Venus	2	6	[10]
PR	(United States) B Mattek-Sands (Croatia) M Pavić	6	6
4	(Netherlands) D Schuurs (Netherlands) J-J Rojer	3	4
5	(Ukraine) L Kichenok (Australia) M Ebden	6	3	[10]
(Japan) E Shibahara (United States) J Withrow	4	6	[5]
WC	(France) E Cascino (France) D Added	3	4
(United States) A Muhammad (United Kingdom) L Glasspool	6	6
(Canada) G Dabrowski (United States) N Lammons	6^{3}	6	[10]
WC	(France) C Paquet (France) L Pouille	7^{7}	2	[8]
(United States) T Townsend (United Kingdom) J Murray	6	7
2	(United States) D Krawczyk (United Kingdom) J Salisbury	2	5

Second round
7	(Ukraine) M Kostyuk (El Salvador) M Arévalo	6	5	[12]
(Australia) S Hunter (Australia) J Peers	4	7	[10]
Alt	(Canada) B Andreescu (New Zealand) M Venus	6	4	[10]
PR	(United States) B Mattek-Sands (Croatia) M Pavić	4	6	[8]
5	(Ukraine) L Kichenok (Australia) M Ebden	5	3
(United States) A Muhammad (United Kingdom) L Glasspool	7	6
(Canada) G Dabrowski (United States) N Lammons	w/o
(United States) T Townsend (United Kingdom) J Murray

Quarterfinals
7	(Ukraine) M Kostyuk (El Salvador) M Arévalo	5	6	[6]
Alt	(Canada) B Andreescu (New Zealand) M Venus	7	3	[10]
(United States) A Muhammad (United Kingdom) L Glasspool	5	7^{7}	[9]
(Canada) G Dabrowski (United States) N Lammons	7	6^{2}	[11]

Semifinals
Alt	(Canada) B Andreescu (New Zealand) M Venus	7^{7}	7^{7}
(Canada) G Dabrowski (United States) N Lammons	6^{5}	6^{4}

== Other entry information ==
=== Wild cards ===
- (France) Clara Burel / (France) Hugo Gaston
- (France) Estelle Cascino / (France) Dan Added
- (France) Alizé Cornet / (France) Édouard Roger-Vasselin
- (France) Léolia Jeanjean / (France) Jonathan Eysseric
- (France) Elixane Lechemia / (France) Albano Olivetti
- (France) Chloé Paquet / (France) Lucas Pouille
- (France) Diane Parry / (France) Harold Mayot
- ~~(France) Nina Radovanovic / (France) Arthur Bouquier~~

=== Alternates ===
- (Canada) Bianca Andreescu / (New Zealand) Michael Venus

=== Withdrawals ===
- (France) Nina Radovanovic / (France) Arthur Bouquier → replaced by (Canada) Bianca Andreescu / (New Zealand) Michael Venus
