= 2026 Svijany Open – Doubles =

Doubles
- 2026 Svijany Open

Final
- Champions: (Spain) Íñigo Cervantes (Ukraine) Denys Molchanov
- Runners-up: (Austria) Maximilian Neuchrist (Czech Republic) David Poljak
- Score: 7–6^{(9–7)}, 6–3

Events
Singles	Doubles
- Svijany Open

Andrew Paulson and Michael Vrbenský were the defending champions but only Paulson chose to defend his title, partnering Joran Vliegen. They lost in the semifinals to Maximilian Neuchrist and David Poljak.

Íñigo Cervantes and Denys Molchanov won the title after defeating Neuchrist and Poljak 7–6^{(9–7)}, 6–3 in the final.

== Seeds ==
1. (Spain) Íñigo Cervantes / (Ukraine) Denys Molchanov (champions)
2. (Czech Republic) Andrew Paulson / (Belgium) Joran Vliegen (semifinals)
3. (Spain) Mario Mansilla Díez / (Spain) Benjamín Winter López (quarterfinals)
4. (India) S D Prajwal Dev / (India) Nitin Kumar Sinha (quarterfinals)

== Draw ==
Key

- Q = Qualifier
- WC = Wild card
- LL = Lucky loser
- Alt = Alternate
- ITF = ITF entry
- PR = Protected ranking
- SR = Special ranking
- SE = Special exempt
- JE = Junior exempt
- JR = Junior Accelerator Programme entrant
- CO = College Accelerator Programme entrant
- NG = Next Gen Accelerator Program entrant
- w/o = Walkover
- r = Retired
- d = Defaulted

First round
1	(Spain) Í Cervantes (Ukraine) D Molchanov	6	6
(Ukraine) Aleksandr Braynin (Ukraine) G Kravchenko	2	3
(Republic of Ireland) C Barry (Bulgaria) A Genov	7^{7}	6
Alt	(Czech Republic) Jiří Barnat (Czech Republic) Adam Duda	6^{5}	3
4	(India) SDP Dev (India) Nitin Kumar Sinha	6	1	[10]
WC	(Czech Republic) J Kumstát (Czech Republic) Jakub Vrba	3	6	[8]
(Czech Republic) D Reček (Czech Republic) D Siniakov	6	6
(Italy) Simone Agostini (South Africa) P Henning	3	4
(Austria) M Neuchrist (Czech Republic) D Poljak	6	6
(Spain) Ignasi Forcano (Netherlands) M Vervoort	4	4
WC	(Czech Republic) Matyáš Černý (Czech Republic) Jonáš Kučera	6	3	[4]
3	(Spain) M Mansilla Díez (Spain) B Winter López	3	6	[10]
(Argentina) LE Ambrogi (Peru) G Bueno	6	6
(Czech Republic) D Kellovský (Czech Republic) M Mrva	3	1
(South Korea) G Campaña Lee (Ukraine) V Uzhylovskyi
2	(Czech Republic) A Paulson (Belgium) J Vliegen	w/o

Quarterfinals
1	(Spain) Í Cervantes (Ukraine) D Molchanov	6	6
(Republic of Ireland) C Barry (Bulgaria) A Genov	4	0
4	(India) SDP Dev (India) NK Sinha	6	3	[7]
(Czech Republic) D Reček (Czech Republic) D Siniakov	3	6	[10]
(Austria) M Neuchrist (Czech Republic) D Poljak	1	6	[10]
3	(Spain) M Mansilla Díez (Spain) B Winter López	6	3	[6]
(Argentina) LE Ambrogi (Peru) G Bueno
2	(Czech Republic) A Paulson (Belgium) J Vliegen	w/o

Semifinals
1	(Spain) Í Cervantes (Ukraine) D Molchanov	7	7^{7}
(Czech Republic) D Reček (Czech Republic) D Siniakov	5	6^{4}
(Austria) M Neuchrist (Czech Republic) D Poljak	4	7^{7}	[10]
2	(Czech Republic) A Paulson (Belgium) J Vliegen	6	6^{4}	[8]

Final
1	(Spain) Í Cervantes (Ukraine) D Molchanov	7^{9}	6
(Austria) M Neuchrist (Czech Republic) D Poljak	6^{7}	3
