= 2026 Charlottesville Men's Pro Challenger – Doubles =

Doubles
- 2026 Charlottesville Men's Pro Challenger

Final
- Champions: (Netherlands) Jarno Jans (Belgium) Joran Vliegen
- Runners-up: (United States) Daniel Milavsky (United States) Braden Shick
- Score: 6–4, 6–4

Events
Singles	Doubles
- Charlottesville Men's Pro Challenger

Tim Rühl and Patrick Zahraj were the defending champions but chose not to defend their title.

Jarno Jans and Joran Vliegen won the title after defeating Daniel Milavsky and Braden Shick 6–4, 6–4 in the final.

== Seeds ==
1. (Mexico) Miguel Ángel Reyes-Varela / (United States) Reese Stalder (quarterfinals)
2. (United States) Trey Hilderbrand / (Romania) Bogdan Pavel (semifinals)
3. (Ecuador) Andy Andrade / (United States) Mac Kiger (first round)
4. (Netherlands) Jarno Jans / (Belgium) Joran Vliegen (champions)

== Draw ==
Key

- Q = Qualifier
- WC = Wild card
- LL = Lucky loser
- Alt = Alternate
- ITF = ITF entry
- PR = Protected ranking
- SR = Special ranking
- SE = Special exempt
- JE = Junior exempt
- JR = Junior Accelerator Programme entrant
- CO = College Accelerator Programme entrant
- NG = Next Gen Accelerator Program entrant
- w/o = Walkover
- r = Retired
- d = Defaulted

First round
1	(Mexico) M Reyes-Varela (United States) R Stalder	6	6
(Antigua and Barbuda) J Maginley (United States) K Poling	2	3
(Republic of Ireland) C Barry (United Kingdom) H Wendelken	7^{7}	6^{5}	[8]
(France) G Blancaneaux (United States) M Zheng	6^{3}	7^{7}	[10]
3	(Ecuador) A Andrade (United States) M Kiger	4	4
PR	(Canada) A Galarneau (Mexico) H Hach Verdugo	6	6
(United States) D Milavsky (United States) B Shick	6	6
(Canada) J Boulais (Germany) J Opitz	4	2
(United Kingdom) T Hands (United Kingdom) M Summers	6	6^{6}	[17]
(United Kingdom) B Jones (United States) J Sheehy	1	7^{8}	[15]
WC	(Sweden) Mans Dahlberg (Switzerland) D Dietrich	3	3
4	(Netherlands) J Jans (Belgium) J Vliegen	6	6
(Australia) J Charlton (United Kingdom) Emile Hudd	6	2	[5]
(Denmark) J Ingildsen (Jordan) A Shelbayh	4	6	[10]
WC	(United States) M Antonius (United States) M Latak	4	4
2	(United States) T Hilderbrand (Romania) B Pavel	6	6

Quarterfinals
1	(Mexico) M Reyes-Varela (United States) R Stalder	6	4	[8]
(France) G Blancaneaux (United States) M Zheng	4	6	[10]
PR	(Canada) A Galarneau (Mexico) H Hach Verdugo	1	7^{7}	[6]
(United States) D Milavsky (United States) B Shick	6	6^{5}	[10]
(United Kingdom) T Hands (United Kingdom) M Summers	4	3
4	(Netherlands) J Jans (Belgium) J Vliegen	6	6
(Denmark) J Ingildsen (Jordan) A Shelbayh	3	4
2	(United States) T Hilderbrand (Romania) B Pavel	6	6

Semifinals
(France) G Blancaneaux (United States) M Zheng	6^{5}	5
(United States) D Milavsky (United States) B Shick	7^{7}	7
4	(Netherlands) J Jans (Belgium) J Vliegen	6	6
2	(United States) T Hilderbrand (Romania) B Pavel	4	4

Final
(United States) D Milavsky (United States) B Shick	4	4
4	(Netherlands) J Jans (Belgium) J Vliegen	6	6
