= 2018 IsarOpen =

- Date: 6 August – 12 August
- Edition: 1st
- Surface: Clay
- Location: Pullach, Germany

Champions

Singles
- (Portugal) Pedro Sousa

Doubles
- (Belgium) Sander Gillé / (Belgium) Joran Vliegen
- IsarOpen

The 2018 IsarOpen was a professional tennis tournament played on clay courts. It was the 1st edition of the tournament which was part of the 2018 ATP Challenger Tour. It took place in Pullach, Germany between 6 August and 12 August 2018.

== Singles main-draw entrants ==
=== Seeds ===
Country	Player	Rank^{1}	Seed
GER	Jan-Lennard Struff	56	1
CZE	Jiří Veselý	89	2
EST	Jürgen Zopp	96	3
ITA	Paolo Lorenzi	110	4
SVK	Martin Kližan	112	5
~~GER~~	~~Yannick Hanfmann~~	~~135~~	~~6~~
NOR	Casper Ruud	138	7
ITA	Simone Bolelli	144	8

- ^{1} Rankings are as of 30 July 2018.

=== Other entrants ===
The following players received wildcards into the singles main draw:

- (Germany) Daniel Masur
- (Germany) Rudolf Molleker
- (Germany) Tim Pütz
- (Germany) Jan-Lennard Struff

The following players received entry into the singles main draw as special exempts:

- (Argentina) Pedro Cachin
- (Portugal) Gonçalo Oliveira

The following players received entry from the qualifying draw:

- (Belgium) Kimmer Coppejans
- (Germany) Kevin Krawietz
- (Italy) Gianluca Mager
- (Sweden) Mikael Ymer

The following players received entry as lucky losers:

- (Russia) Alen Avidzba
- (Belgium) Arthur De Greef
- (France) Alexandre Müller

== Champions ==
=== Singles ===
- (Portugal) Pedro Sousa def. (Germany) Jan-Lennard Struff 6–1, 6–3.

=== Doubles ===
- (Belgium) Sander Gillé / (Belgium) Joran Vliegen def. (Italy) Simone Bolelli / (Italy) Daniele Bracciali 6–2, 6–2.
