= 2018 IsarOpen – Doubles =

Doubles
- 2018 IsarOpen

Final
- Champions: (Belgium) Sander Gillé (Belgium) Joran Vliegen
- Runners-up: (Italy) Simone Bolelli (Italy) Daniele Bracciali
- Score: 6–2, 6–2

Events
Singles	Doubles
- IsarOpen

This was the first edition of the tournament.

Sander Gillé and Joran Vliegen won the title after defeating Simone Bolelli and Daniele Bracciali 6–2, 6–2 in the final.

== Seeds ==
1. (Spain) David Marrero / (Argentina) Andrés Molteni (first round)
2. (Belarus) Andrei Vasilevski / (Slovakia) Igor Zelenay (first round)
3. (Monaco) Romain Arneodo / (France) Jonathan Eysseric (first round)
4. (Germany) Kevin Krawietz / (Germany) Andreas Mies (quarterfinals)

== Draw ==
Key

- Q = Qualifier
- WC = Wild card
- LL = Lucky loser
- Alt = Alternate
- ITF = ITF entry
- PR = Protected ranking
- SR = Special ranking
- SE = Special exempt
- JE = Junior exempt
- JR = Junior Accelerator Programme entrant
- CO = College Accelerator Programme entrant
- NG = Next Gen Accelerator Program entrant
- w/o = Walkover
- r = Retired
- d = Defaulted

First round
1	(Spain) D Marrero (Argentina) A Molteni	6	3	[4]
WC	(Germany) M Moraing (Germany) O Otte	3	6	[10]
(Belarus) A Bury (Ukraine) V Manafov	6	6
WC	(Germany) J Härteis (Germany) C Seraphim	1	4
3	(Monaco) R Arneodo (France) J Eysseric	3	3
(Uruguay) A Behar (Spain) D Vega Hernández	6	6
(India) S Balaji (India) V Vardhan	5	4
(Belgium) S Gillé (Belgium) J Vliegen	7	6
WC	(Germany) Kai Lemstra (Germany) R Molleker	4	5
(Italy) S Bolelli (Italy) D Bracciali	6	7
(Italy) P Lorenzi (Italy) A Motti	2	3
4	(Germany) K Krawietz (Germany) A Mies	6	6
(Germany) M Bachinger (Germany) T Pütz	6	6
(Netherlands) S Arends (Austria) T-S Weissborn	4	2
(Portugal) G Oliveira (Brazil) F Romboli	7^{7}	7^{7}
2	(Belarus) A Vasilevski (Slovakia) I Zelenay	6^{4}	6^{2}

Quarterfinals
WC	(Germany) M Moraing (Germany) O Otte	7	6
(Belarus) A Bury (Ukraine) V Manafov	5	4
(Uruguay) A Behar (Spain) D Vega Hernández	6^{2}	4
(Belgium) S Gillé (Belgium) J Vliegen	7^{7}	6
(Italy) S Bolelli (Italy) D Bracciali	4	6	[12]
4	(Germany) K Krawietz (Germany) A Mies	6	3	[10]
(Germany) M Bachinger (Germany) T Pütz	6	7^{7}
(Portugal) G Oliveira (Brazil) F Romboli	2	6^{1}

Semifinals
WC	(Germany) M Moraing (Germany) O Otte	1	2
(Belgium) S Gillé (Belgium) J Vliegen	6	6
(Italy) S Bolelli (Italy) D Bracciali	6	6
(Germany) M Bachinger (Germany) T Pütz	3	1

Final
(Belgium) S Gillé (Belgium) J Vliegen	6	6
(Italy) S Bolelli (Italy) D Bracciali	2	2
