= 2026 Charlottesville Men's Pro Challenger =

- Date: 2 – 8 November
- Edition: 17th
- Surface: Hard (indoor)
- Location: Charlottesville, United States

Champions

Singles
- (United States) Stefan Kozlov

Doubles
- (Netherlands) Jarno Jans / (Belgium) Joran Vliegen
- Charlottesville Men's Pro Challenger

The 2026 Jonathan Fried Pro Challenger was a professional tennis tournament played on indoor hardcourts. It was the 17th edition of the tournament which was part of the 2026 ATP Challenger Tour, taking place in Charlottesville, United States from November 2 to November 8, 2026.

== Singles main-draw entrants ==
=== Seeds ===
Country	Player	Rank^{1}	Seed
USA	Marcos Giron	88	1
USA	Michael Zheng	101	2
COL	Nicolás Mejía	115	3
FRA	Valentin Royer	117	4
FRA	Clément Chidekh	134	5
USA	Darwin Blanch	144	6
CAN	Alexis Galarneau	192	7
CAN	Liam Draxl	194	8

- ^{1} Rankings are as of 26 October 2026.

=== Other entrants ===
The following players received wildcards into the singles main draw:

- (United States) Michael Antonius
- (United States) Marcos Giron
- (Spain) Andrés Santamarta Roig

The following player received entry into the singles main draw through the College Accelerator programme:

- (United States) Trevor Svajda

The following player received entry into the singles main draw through the Junior Accelerator programme:

- (United States) Jack Kennedy

The following players received entry from the qualifying draw:

- (Canada) Justin Boulais
- (United States) Andrew Fenty
- (United States) Andres Martin
- (United States) Aidan Mayo
- (United States) Daniel Milavsky
- (Japan) James Trotter

== Champions ==
=== Singles ===
- (United States) Stefan Kozlov def. (United States) Aidan Mayo 7–5, 2–6, 7–6^{(7–3)}.

=== Doubles ===
- (Netherlands) Jarno Jans / (Belgium) Joran Vliegen def. (United States) Daniel Milavsky / (United States) Braden Shick 6–4, 6–4.
