= 2026 Advantage Cars Prague Open – Men's doubles =

Men's doubles
- 2026 Advantage Cars Prague Open

Final
- Champions: (Czech Republic) Andrew Paulson (Belgium) Joran Vliegen
- Runners-up: (Sweden) Erik Grevelius (Sweden) Adam Heinonen
- Score: 6–4, 6–3

Events
Singles	men	women
Doubles	men	women
- Advantage Cars Prague Open

Denys Molchanov and Matěj Vocel were the defending champions but chose to defend their title with different partners. Molchanov partnered Bogdan Pavel but lost in the quarterfinals to Erik Grevelius and Adam Heinonen. Vocel partnered Jakub Paul but lost in the first round to Eduardo Ribeiro and Matías Soto.

Andrew Paulson and Joran Vliegen won the title after defeating Grevelius and Heinonen 6–4, 6–3 in the final.

== Seeds ==
1. (Switzerland) Jakub Paul / (Czech Republic) Matěj Vocel (first round)
2. (Serbia) Stefan Latinović / (Netherlands) Thijmen Loof (quarterfinals)
3. (Poland) Karol Drzewiecki / (Poland) Szymon Walków (first round)
4. (Sweden) Erik Grevelius / (Sweden) Adam Heinonen (final)

== Draw ==
Key

- Q = Qualifier
- WC = Wild card
- LL = Lucky loser
- Alt = Alternate
- ITF = ITF entry
- PR = Protected ranking
- SR = Special ranking
- SE = Special exempt
- JE = Junior exempt
- JR = Junior Accelerator Programme entrant
- CO = College Accelerator Programme entrant
- NG = Next Gen Accelerator Program entrant
- w/o = Walkover
- r = Retired
- d = Defaulted

First round
1	(Switzerland) J Paul (Czech Republic) M Vocel	4	6^{9}
(Brazil) E Ribeiro (Chile) M Soto	6	7^{11}
(Czech Republic) D Reček (Czech Republic) D Siniakov	4	6	[10]
(Poland) S Kielan (Spain) D Vega Hernández	6	0	[6]
4	(Sweden) E Grevelius (Sweden) A Heinonen	6	3	[10]
(Spain) M Mansilla Díez (Spain) B Winter López	4	6	[6]
(Dominican Republic) N Hardt (Colombia) C Rodríguez	3	2
(Ukraine) D Molchanov (Romania) B Pavel	6	6
WC	(Czech Republic) J Kumstát (Czech Republic) Štěpán Pecák	6^{4}	6	[6]
(Czech Republic) A Paulson (Belgium) J Vliegen	7^{7}	3	[10]
(Czech Republic) H Bartoň (Czech Republic) M Vrbenský	7^{7}	6^{5}	[10]
3	(Poland) K Drzewiecki (Poland) S Walków	6^{4}	7^{7}	[3]
(Netherlands) J Jans (United Kingdom) M Whitehouse	6	6
(Bolivia) B Arias (Uruguay) I Carou	3	4
Alt	(Czech Republic) Mátyáš Černý (Slovakia) A Martin	6	6^{0}	[8]
2	(Serbia) S Latinović (Netherlands) T Loof	2	7^{7}	[10]

Quarterfinals
(Brazil) E Ribeiro (Chile) M Soto	6	4	[7]
(Czech Republic) D Reček (Czech Republic) D Siniakov	0	6	[10]
4	(Sweden) E Grevelius (Sweden) A Heinonen	6	6
(Ukraine) D Molchanov (Romania) B Pavel	4	4
(Czech Republic) A Paulson (Belgium) J Vliegen	5	7^{10}	[14]
(Czech Republic) H Bartoň (Czech Republic) M Vrbenský	7	6^{8}	[12]
(Netherlands) J Jans (United Kingdom) M Whitehouse	6	6
2	(Serbia) S Latinović (Netherlands) T Loof	3	2

Semifinals
(Czech Republic) D Reček (Czech Republic) D Siniakov	6^{3}	4
4	(Sweden) E Grevelius (Sweden) A Heinonen	7^{7}	6
(Czech Republic) A Paulson (Belgium) J Vliegen	6	6
(Netherlands) J Jans (United Kingdom) M Whitehouse	3	2

Final
4	(Sweden) E Grevelius (Sweden) A Heinonen	4	3
(Czech Republic) A Paulson (Belgium) J Vliegen	6	6
