= 2026 Charlottesville Men's Pro Challenger – Singles =

Singles
- 2026 Charlottesville Men's Pro Challenger

Final
- Champion: (United States) Stefan Kozlov
- Runner-up: (United States) Aidan Mayo
- Score: 7–5, 2–6, 7–6^{(7–3)}

Events
Singles	Doubles
- Charlottesville Men's Pro Challenger

Rafael Jódar was the defending champion but chose not to defend his title.

Stefan Kozlov won the title after defeating Aidan Mayo 7–5, 2–6, 7–6^{(7–3)} in the final.

== Seeds ==
1. (United States) Marcos Giron (quarterfinals)
2. (United States) Michael Zheng (first round)
3. (Colombia) Nicolás Mejía (first round)
4. (France) Valentin Royer (first round)
5. (France) Clément Chidekh (semifinals)
6. (United States) Darwin Blanch (second round)
7. (Canada) Alexis Galarneau (first round)
8. (Canada) Liam Draxl (first round)

== Draw ==
Key

- Q = Qualifier
- WC = Wild card
- LL = Lucky loser
- Alt = Alternate
- ITF = ITF entry
- PR = Protected ranking
- SR = Special ranking
- SE = Special exempt
- JE = Junior exempt
- JR = Junior Accelerator Programme entrant
- CO = College Accelerator Programme entrant
- NG = Next Gen Accelerator Program entrant
- w/o = Walkover
- r = Retired
- d = Defaulted

=== Finals ===
Semifinals
5	(France) Clément Chidekh	2	6	4
(United States) Stefan Kozlov	6	1	6
Q	(United States) Aidan Mayo	6	3
(Ecuador) Andy Andrade	1	1^{r}

Final
(United States) Stefan Kozlov	7	2	7^{7}
Q	(United States) Aidan Mayo	5	6	6^{3}

=== Top half ===
First round
1/WC	(United States) M Giron	6	6
(Switzerland) D Dietrich	2	4
Q	(Canada) J Boulais	6	6
(United States) JJ Wolf	3	2
JR	(United States) J Kennedy	7	1	6
(Czech Republic) H Bartoň	5	6	3
WC	(Spain) A Santamarta Roig	1	2
5	(France) C Chidekh	6	6
3	(Colombia) N Mejía	6^{5}	6	5
(United States) M Cassone	7^{7}	4	7
(United States) S Kozlov	6	6
Q	(United States) A Martin	4	0
(United States) C Smith	3^{r}
(United States) B Shick	2
Q	(United States) A Fenty	4	3
6	(United States) Dar Blanch	6	6

Second round
1/WC	(United States) M Giron	6^{5}	6	7
Q	(Canada) J Boulais	7^{7}	1	5
JR	(United States) J Kennedy	1	1
5	(France) C Chidekh	6	6
(United States) M Cassone	2	2
(United States) S Kozlov	6	6
(United States) B Shick	7	6
6	(United States) Dar Blanch	5	3

Quarterfinals
1/WC	(United States) M Giron	4	1
5	(France) C Chidekh	6	6
(United States) S Kozlov	6	6
(United States) B Shick	4	1

Semifinals
5	(France) C Chidekh	2	6	4
(United States) S Kozlov	6	1	6

=== Bottom half ===
First round
7	(Canada) A Galarneau	6^{3}	3
Q	(United States) D Milavsky	7^{7}	6
(Germany) MH Rehberg	6	3	7
CO	(United States) T Svajda	4	6	5
Q	(United States) A Mayo	7	6
(Bulgaria) P Nesterov	5	2
(United Kingdom) A Gray	6	6
4	(France) V Royer	3	4
8	(Canada) L Draxl	3	2
(Poland) M Kaśnikowski	6	6
(Jordan) A Shelbayh	4	6	4
WC	(United States) M Antonius	6	4	6
(United Kingdom) H Wendelken	1	6	4
(Ecuador) A Andrade	6	4	6
Q	(Japan) J Trotter	6	6
2	(United States) M Zheng	3	4

Second round
Q	(United States) D Milavsky	7^{7}	5	5
(Germany) MH Rehberg	6^{2}	7	7
Q	(United States) A Mayo	6	6
(United Kingdom) A Gray	1	1
(Poland) M Kaśnikowski	6	1	7
WC	(United States) M Antonius	2	6	5
(Ecuador) A Andrade	3	6	6
Q	(Japan) J Trotter	6	3	1

Quarterfinals
(Germany) MH Rehberg	6^{5}	3
Q	(United States) A Mayo	7^{7}	6
(Poland) M Kaśnikowski	6	4	4
(Ecuador) A Andrade	3	6	6

Semifinals
Q	(United States) A Mayo	6	3
(Ecuador) A Andrade	1	1^{r}
