= Oostkerke Castle =

14th-century castle in Belgium

Coordinates: 51.275°N 3.293°E

- Belgium
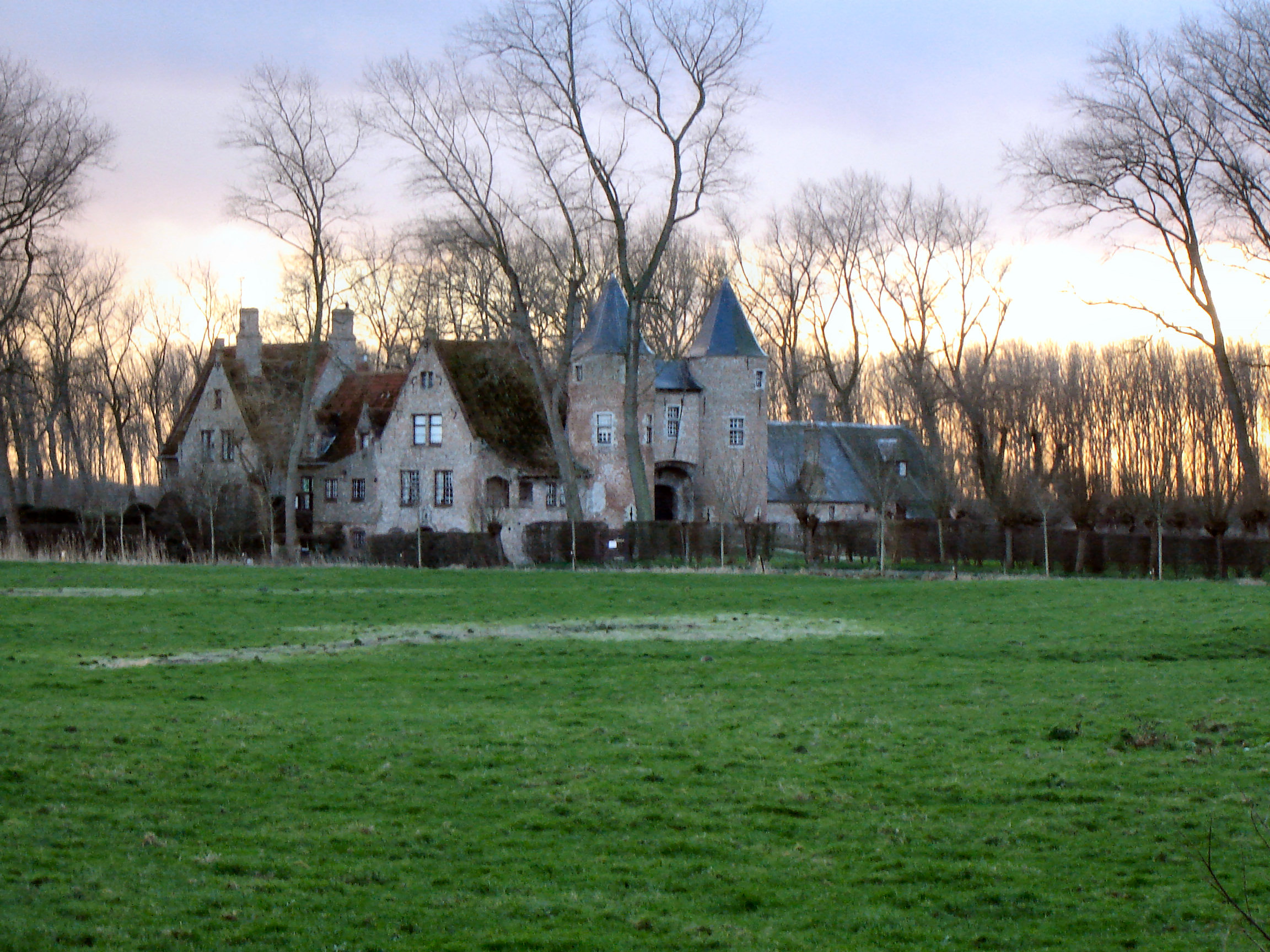

Site information
- Type: Castle

Oostkerke Castle is a castle in Damme, Belgium. The castle can be found south of the village Oostkerke, and was constructed in the 14th century.

== History ==
The first mention of a Lord of Oostkerke, Dodinus van Oostkerke, dates back to 1089. A building, possibly a wooden keep, already existed on this site from the 10th or 11th century. In the 13th century, a brick keep with a rectangular plan stood here. The first written mention of Den Hove van Oostkerke dates back to 1358. In the 14th century, a walled castle was built with an upper courtyard, which contained the actual feudal residence, and a lower courtyard. The upper courtyard was walled and had three towers. The lower courtyard was flanked by two large towers and included a dovecote and an icehouse.

In 1462, Margaretha van Oostkerke died, marking the end of the Van Oostkerke family. The estate passed through inheritance to the de Fever-de Baens family, and in 1529 to the Croÿ family. They didn't live there permanently, and the castle fell into disrepair, ravaged by religious disputes and a storm (1606). In 1623, the De Corte family became the owners. Filips de Corte restored the castle, incorporating elements of the Bruges Renaissance style. Around 1700, however, the upper courtyard was demolished, and the lower courtyard was subsequently used as a castle. An orchard appeared on the site of the upper courtyard.

In 1799, the castle was sold at public auction by the French government, but was repurchased by the former owner. After several changes of ownership, it passed to the Mabesoone family, who were farmers and millers. The castle again fell into disrepair, and in 1908 it was sold to the Van der Borght family. Robert van der Borght commissioned restorations in a historicist style, but the castle was severely damaged during the First World War. He had it restored again in 1922. In 1937, the castle was sold to Jozef van der Elst, who purchased estate land and commissioned a garden design by Dutch landscape and garden architect Mien Ruys. A Neo-Renaissance building, designed by Luc Viérin, was built.

During the Second World War, at the end of 1944, the castle again suffered greatly from artillery bombardment and flooding. In the 1950s, the gardens were redesigned and the castle restored.

== Today ==
The current castle is located in the northeast corner of the former farmyard. The gatehouse with its two round towers dates from the 14th century. In addition to some 18th-century sections, there are many buildings from the first half of the 20th century (1922, 1950) that were built in a historicist style.
The gardens, designed by Mien Ruys and laid out in the early 1950s, are particularly significant. They blend seamlessly with the surrounding polder landscape, and historical elements (canals and remnants of walls) were also integrated into the design.

== See also ==
- List of castles in Belgium
