= 2018 IsarOpen – Singles =

Singles
- 2018 IsarOpen

Final
- Champion: (Portugal) Pedro Sousa
- Runner-up: (Germany) Jan-Lennard Struff
- Score: 6–1, 6–3

Events
Singles	Doubles
- IsarOpen

This was the first edition of the tournament.

Pedro Sousa won the title after defeating Jan-Lennard Struff 6–1, 6–3 in the final.

== Seeds ==
1. (Germany) Jan-Lennard Struff (final)
2. (Czech Republic) Jiří Veselý (quarterfinals, retired)
3. (Estonia) Jürgen Zopp (second round)
4. (Italy) Paolo Lorenzi (first round)
5. (Slovakia) Martin Kližan (semifinals)
6. (Germany) Yannick Hanfmann (withdrew)
7. (Norway) Casper Ruud (first round)
8. (Italy) Simone Bolelli (first round)

== Draw ==
Key

- Q = Qualifier
- WC = Wild card
- LL = Lucky loser
- Alt = Alternate
- ITF = ITF entry
- PR = Protected ranking
- SR = Special ranking
- SE = Special exempt
- JE = Junior exempt
- JR = Junior Accelerator Programme entrant
- CO = College Accelerator Programme entrant
- NG = Next Gen Accelerator Program entrant
- w/o = Walkover
- r = Retired
- d = Defaulted

=== Finals ===
Semifinals
1/WC	(Germany) Jan-Lennard Struff	6	6
5	(Slovakia) Martin Kližan	4	4
Q	(Germany) Kevin Krawietz	1	6	1
(Portugal) Pedro Sousa	6	1	6

Final
1/WC	(Germany) Jan-Lennard Struff	1	3
(Portugal) Pedro Sousa	6	6

=== Top half ===
First round
1/WC	(Germany) J-L Struff	6	4	7^{7}
WC	(Germany) D Masur	3	6	6^{3}
(Germany) M Moraing	6	3	6
(Brazil) G Clezar	2	6	3
(Argentina) C Berlocq	6^{7}	6	6
SE	(Portugal) G Oliveira	7^{9}	4	4
WC	(Germany) T Pütz	6	3	7^{8}
7	(Norway) C Ruud	2	6	6^{6}
3	(Estonia) J Zopp	6	3	6
SE	(Argentina) P Cachin	4	6	1
Q	(Sweden) M Ymer	4	6	7
WC	(Germany) R Molleker	6	4	5
(Poland) K Majchrzak	6	6
(Germany) M Bachinger	3	4
(Spain) R Ojeda Lara	3	2
5	(Slovakia) M Kližan	6	6

Second round
1/WC	(Germany) J-L Struff	6	6
(Germany) M Moraing	4	4
(Argentina) C Berlocq	7^{7}	7
WC	(Germany) T Pütz	6^{3}	5
3	(Estonia) J Zopp	6^{2}	4
Q	(Sweden) M Ymer	7^{7}	6
(Poland) K Majchrzak	3	3
5	(Slovakia) M Kližan	6	6

Quarterfinals
1/WC	(Germany) J-L Struff	4	6	6
(Argentina) C Berlocq	6	3	2
Q	(Sweden) M Ymer	3	2
5	(Slovakia) M Kližan	6	6

Semifinals
1/WC	(Germany) J-L Struff	6	6
5	(Slovakia) M Kližan	4	4

=== Bottom half ===
First round
8	(Italy) S Bolelli	3	4
(Austria) S Ofner	6	6
(Czech Republic) Z Kolář	3	4
Q	(Germany) K Krawietz	6	6
LL	(Russia) A Avidzba	6	3	6
(Germany) F Mayer	3	6	3
Q	(Italy) G Mager	6	3	6
4	(Italy) P Lorenzi	4	6	2
LL	(France) A Müller	3	2
(Portugal) P Sousa	6	6
(Germany) O Otte	6	3	5
(Spain) P Martínez	3	6	7
LL	(Belgium) A De Greef	2	7	1
Q	(Belgium) K Coppejans	6	5	6
(Russia) A Vatutin	7^{7}	5	0
2	(Czech Republic) J Veselý	6^{5}	7	6

Second round
(Austria) S Ofner	6	6^{4}	6^{8}
Q	(Germany) K Krawietz	3	7^{7}	7^{10}
LL	(Russia) A Avidzba	6^{4}	3
Q	(Italy) G Mager	7^{7}	6
(Portugal) P Sousa	6	1	7^{7}
(Spain) P Martínez	4	6	6^{5}
Q	(Belgium) K Coppejans	5	6	6^{4}
2	(Czech Republic) J Veselý	7	1	7^{7}

Quarterfinals
Q	(Germany) K Krawietz	5	6	6
Q	(Italy) G Mager	7	3	1
(Portugal) P Sousa	5	5
2	(Czech Republic) J Veselý	7	2^{r}

Semifinals
Q	(Germany) K Krawietz	1	6	1
(Portugal) P Sousa	6	1	6
