= Guthagon =

Irish hermit

Saint Guthagon
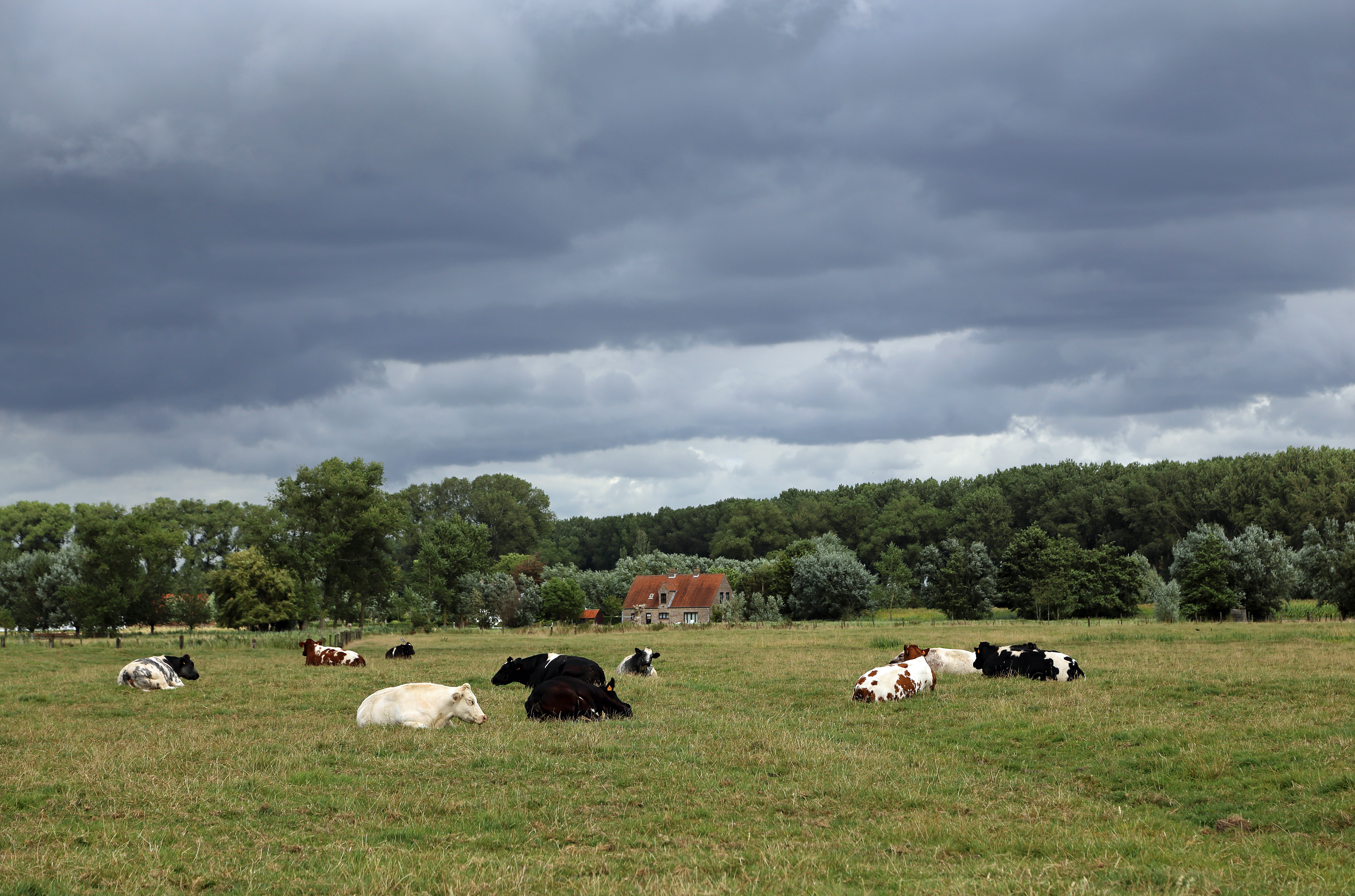
- Countryside near Oostekerke (municipality of Damme, Belgium)
- Born: Ireland
- Residence: Oostkerke, Flanders, Belgium
- Died: 8th century Belgium
- Feast: 3 July

Saint Guthagon (or Guthagonius, Guthagonus) was a possibly Irish hermit who lived in Belgium, most likely in the 8th century, and became venerated as a saint.

== Monks of Ramsgate account ==
The monks of St Augustine's Abbey, Ramsgate wrote in their Book of Saints (1921),

Guthagon (St.) (July 3)
(8th cent.) An Irish Saint, who crossed over into Belgium, and there lived the life of a hermit. Many miracles have been wrought at his tomb.

== Baring-Gould's account ==
Sabine Baring-Gould (1834–1924) in his Lives Of The Saints wrote under July 3,

S. GUTHAGON, C. (uncertain.) [Belgian Martyrologies. Authority :—Popular tradition.]

ACCORDING to worthless popular tradition, and lections for the festival at Oostkerke, near Fumes; in Belgium, Guthagon, son of a Scottish king, came with his faithful servant Ghillo into Flanders, and settled at Oostkerke, (Note: This appears to refer to the village of Oostkerke in the Damme municipality, between Bruges and Knokke.) where he died and was buried.

His relics were elevated and enshrined by Gerard, bishop of Tournai, in 1159, and July 3rd is the day of this elevation. Nothing more is known of this Saint. He was probably some pious pilgrim of Irish or Scottish nationality, who died at Oostkerke, and popular imagination has exalted him into a prince.

== Butler's account ==
The hagiographer Alban Butler (1710–1773) wrote in his Lives of the Fathers, Martyrs, and Other Principal Saints under July 3,

St. Guthagon, Recluse

HE was an Irishman of royal blood, who, forsaking the world to labour in securing eternal happiness, led a penitential, contemplative life at Oostkerk, near Bruges, in Flanders, with B. Gillon, an individual companion. He was famed for his eminent sanctity, attested by miracles after his death. His shrine is there held in veneration, and a chapel built in his honour. He is said to have lived in the eighth century. Gerald, bishop of Tournay, translated the relics of this saint on the 3rd of July, 1059, in the presence of the abbots of Dun, Oudenbourg, and Ececkout; and on the 1st of October, 1444, they were visited by Nicholas, suffragan bishop of Tournay. See Colgan in MSS. and Molanus, p. 136.

== O'Hanlon's account ==
John O'Hanlon (1821–1905) wrote of Guthagon in his Lives of the Irish Saints under July 3. St. Guthagon, Confessor, in Belgium, probably in the Eighth Century. He notes that the Belgian Flemings tended to call all strangers Scots, but it is generally accepted that Guthagon came from Scotia, which could mean Ireland or Scotland. He continues,

Some will have it, that he journeyed to Rome; yet, although such pilgrimages to the shrines of the Apostles and martyrs there were undertaken by the Irish, Scots and Angles, soon after their conversion to Christianity, there does not appear to have been sufficient warrant for that statement in reference to St. Guthagon. Through religious motives, however, he entered on a pilgrimage, and with a companion, named Gillon. They arrived in Belgium, but at what period is not with certainty known. They rested at a place known as Knocken or Cnokem, which was situated on the maritime shore of Flanders. Nor was it far removed from Oostkerke. This village lay near Burges, on the sea side, between it and Slusa. There the virtuous life of St. Guthegon gave very great edification to the people of that country. Another companion, Gildulfus, is commemorated with the foregoing, and he spent an eremitical life with them, in Belgium. Here, St. Guthagon led a solitary life, until the time of his death. It is not known for certain, whether he died at Cnokem or at Oostkerke. However, the clergy and people of that district reverently interred his body, according to tradition in the western part of the cemetery of Oostkerke. Those holy men, Saints Guthagon and Gillon, rest at Oist-Kerke, in Flanders.

After St. Guthagon's death, miracles were wrought at his grave. Gerald, Bishop of Tourney, in the year 1159 exhumed St. Guthagon's body and placed It in a feretrum. The Abbots of Aldenburg, Dunens and of Quercetan were presents. It would seem, that at a subsequent period, towards the end of A.D. 1444. there was another translation of St. Guthagon's remains. In the succeeding century, Jean Ver-Meulen relates, that he saw these relics kept within iron gratings in the wall of the church. It has been remarked in our saint's office, that the shrine was hardly kept in a becoming manner. The Calvinists profaned the relics of St. Guthagon after the Reformation, and they seem to have utterly destroyed them; nothing having remained but a tooth of the holy man, which had been transferred to the collegiate church of St. Saviour, at Bruges. On the case containing.it had been inscribed these words : "Dens S. Guthagonis."

In the beginning of the last century, the tooth of St. Guthagon was kept in the church at Oostkerke, and on the 3rd day of each July, it was there exposed for the veneration of the faithful. Formerly, his feast was kept there with great solemnity, and on it there was an obligation for hearing Mass. This, however, had been abrogated, yet a proper office for a Confessor not a Pontiff had been recited, and he was invoked as a minor patron of that place. The feast of this saint is set down at the 3rd of July, in the enlarged edition of Usuard's Martyrology; also, in a Manuscript Catalogue of the Saints & Scotland; as likewise, in the Breviary of Aberdeen. John Wilson, in his " Martyrologium Anglicanum," sets him down as an Irishman, at this day. The name of Gutbagon occurs, at this date, in the anonymous Catalogue, published by O'Sullevan Beare, as Guthagonius. Molanus and Henry Fitz-Simon set him down, as Guthagonus, Rex et Confessor, at the 3rd July.," Again, a feast has been assigned to him, at the 1st of October. This appears as having reference to the Translation of his Relics.

== Sources ==
- Baring-Gould, Sabine (1897), The Lives Of The Saints, vol. 6, June, London: J. C. Nimmo This article incorporates text from this source, which is in the public domain.
- Butler, Alban (1866), The Lives of the Fathers, Martyrs, and Other Principal Saints, vol. 7, James Duffy This article incorporates text from this source, which is in the public domain.
- O'Hanlon, John (1875), Lives of the Irish Saints : with special festivals, and the commemorations of holy persons, vol. 7, Dublin: J. Duffy This article incorporates text from this source, which is in the public domain.
- St. Augustine's Abbey, Ramsgate (1921), The Book of saints : a dictionary of servants of God canonized by the Catholic Church, London: A. & C. Black, ltd. This article incorporates text from this source, which is in the public domain.
