= Oostkerke (Damme) =

- Borough
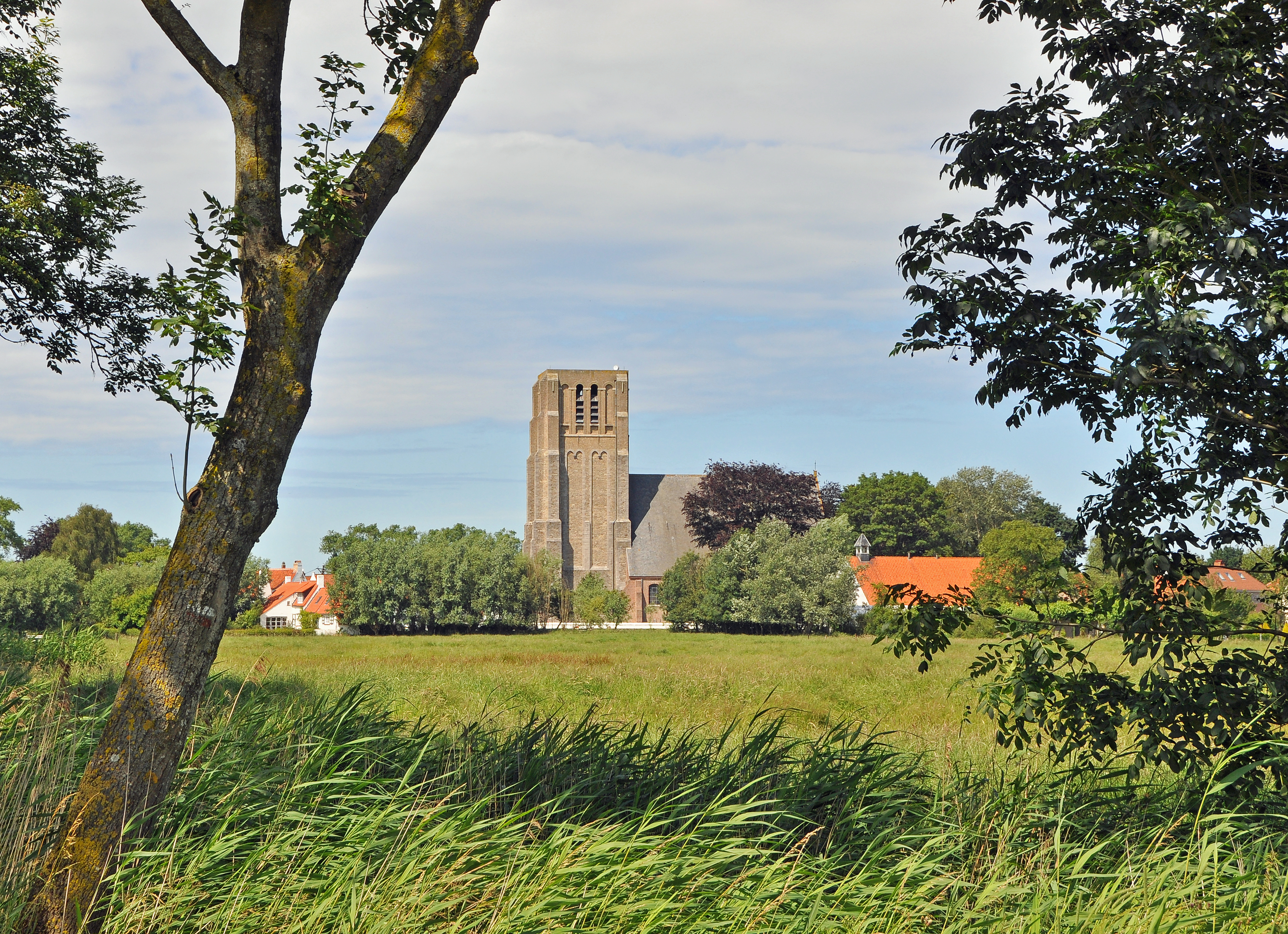
- The village seen from the south

- Location within Belgium
- Coordinates: 51.277778°N 3.293889°E -->
- Country: Belgium
- Region: Flanders
- Province: West Flanders
- Municipality: Damme

Area
  - Total: 1,752 ha (4,330 acres)

Population
  - Total: 600
  - Density: 34/km^{2} (89/sq mi)

Oostkerke is a Belgian polder village and a borough of the West Flemish town of Damme. Oostkerke is 1,752 hectares (4,330 acres) in size and has about 600 inhabitants.

== Location ==
The small village center is surrounded by old whitewashed houses. Nearby there is Oostkerke Castle and two windmills, and several canals are also nearby. In 1974 Oostkerke was voted the most beautiful village in West Flanders.

== Church ==
Oostkerke is one of the oldest church communities of West Flanders, and for some time the communities of Damme, Moerkerke, Westkapelle and Lapscheure were within the Oostkerke parish. According to legend, the Irish hermit and saint Guthagon died in or near Oostkerke. He came to be considered a minor patron of that place. After miracles occurred at his place of burial a chapel was erected. The Bishop of Tournai placed the relics of his body in a shrine in 1159. The church's graveyard may still have graves from the 14th and 15th centuries. During the Reformation the saint's relics were scattered, and only one tooth survived. The church was destroyed at the end of World War II, but was rebuilt to the original plan.

== Sources ==
- Hendrik De Leyn, "Oostkerke", Damme-online
- O'Hanlon, John (1875), Lives of the Irish Saints : with special festivals, and the commemorations of holy persons, vol. 7, Dublin: J. Duffy This article incorporates text from this source, which is in the public domain.
