= 2026 Advantage Cars Prague Open – Men's singles =

Men's singles
- 2026 Advantage Cars Prague Open

Final
- Champion: (Czech Republic) Jan Kumstát
- Runner-up: (Chinese Taipei) Tseng Chun-hsin
- Score: 5–7, 6–3, 6–0

Events
Singles	men	women
Doubles	men	women
- Advantage Cars Prague Open

Filip Misolic was the defending champion but chose not to defend his title.

Jan Kumstát won the title after defeating Tseng Chun-hsin 5–7, 6–3, 6–0 in the final.

== Seeds ==
1. (Ukraine) Vitaliy Sachko (withdrew)
2. (Belgium) Kimmer Coppejans (second round)
3. (Belgium) Gilles-Arnaud Bailly (first round)
4. (India) Sumit Nagal (second round)
5. (Czech Republic) Martin Krumich (first round)
6. (Chile) Matías Soto (first round)
7. (Romania) Cezar Crețu (second round)
8. (Czech Republic) Hynek Bartoň (first round)

== Draw ==
Key

- Q = Qualifier
- WC = Wild card
- LL = Lucky loser
- Alt = Alternate
- ITF = ITF entry
- PR = Protected ranking
- SR = Special ranking
- SE = Special exempt
- JE = Junior exempt
- JR = Junior Accelerator Programme entrant
- CO = College Accelerator Programme entrant
- NG = Next Gen Accelerator Program entrant
- w/o = Walkover
- r = Retired
- d = Defaulted

=== Finals ===
Semifinals
(Chinese Taipei) Tseng Chun-hsin	6	6
Q	(Slovakia) Norbert Gombos	4	2
SE	(Czech Republic) Jan Kumstát	6	6
(Romania) Filip Cristian Jianu	1	4

Final
(Chinese Taipei) Tseng Chun-hsin	7	3	0
SE	(Czech Republic) Jan Kumstát	5	6	6

=== Top half ===
First round
Q	(Ukraine) O Krutykh	6	6
WC	(Czech Republic) D Siniakov	3	4
WC	(Czech Republic) J Filip	1	2
(Dominican Republic) N Hardt	6	6
Alt	(Czech Republic) M Gengel	6	3	3
(Argentina) JB Torres	4	6	6
(Chinese Taipei) C-h Tseng	6	6
8	(Czech Republic) H Bartoň	4	1
3	(Belgium) GA Bailly	6	1	4
Q	(Slovakia) N Gombos	4	6	6
(Germany) F Broska	3	5
(France) Sean Cuenin	6	7
(Spain) O Roca Batalla	7^{7}	5	5
Q	(Romania) Radu Mihai Papoe	6^{4}	7	7
Q	(Spain) J Barranco Cosano	2	6	6
5	(Czech Republic) M Krumich	6	4	4

Second round
Q	(Ukraine) O Krutykh	6	6
(Dominican Republic) N Hardt	3	0
(Argentina) JB Torres	5	6	1
(Chinese Taipei) C-h Tseng	7	2	6
Q	(Slovakia) N Gombos	6^{1}	6	6
(France) S Cuenin	7^{7}	3	4
Q	(Romania) RM Papoe	6	6
Q	(Spain) J Barranco Cosano	4	3

Quarterfinals
Q	(Ukraine) O Krutykh	2	4
(Chinese Taipei) C-h Tseng	6	6
Q	(Slovakia) N Gombos	6	4	6
Q	(Romania) RM Papoe	1	6	2

Semifinals
(Chinese Taipei) C-h Tseng	6	6
Q	(Slovakia) N Gombos	4	2

=== Bottom half ===
First round
7	(Romania) C Crețu	2	6	6
NG	(France) T Faurel	6	2	4
(Czech Republic) M Mrva	2	6	6
Q	(Bosnia and Herzegovina) N Fatić	6	2	4
(Czech Republic) Petr Brunclík	5	1
SE	(Czech Republic) J Kumstát	7	6
Alt	(Brazil) E Ribeiro	6^{5}	4
4	(India) S Nagal	7^{7}	6
6	(Chile) M Soto	3	3
Q	(Germany) R Molleker	6	6
(Romania) FC Jianu	6	6
LL	(Slovakia) A Martin	2	2
(Germany) MH Rehberg	5
WC	(Czech Republic) Jakub Nicod	3^{r}
(Spain) M Damas	5	1
2	(Belgium) K Coppejans	7	6

Second round
7	(Romania) C Crețu	1	2
(Czech Republic) M Mrva	6	6
SE	(Czech Republic) J Kumstát	7	6
4	(India) S Nagal	5	3
Q	(Germany) R Molleker	6^{9}	4
(Romania) FC Jianu	7^{11}	6
(Germany) MH Rehberg	6	6
2	(Belgium) K Coppejans	4	1

Quarterfinals
(Czech Republic) M Mrva	1	5
SE	(Czech Republic) J Kumstát	6	7
(Romania) FC Jianu	6	6
(Germany) MH Rehberg	3	4

Semifinals
SE	(Czech Republic) J Kumstát	6	6
(Romania) FC Jianu	1	4
