= 2019 Bratislava Open – Singles =

Singles
- 2019 Bratislava Open

Final
- Champion: (Slovakia) Norbert Gombos
- Runner-up: (Hungary) Attila Balázs
- Score: 6–3, 3–6, 6–2

Events
Singles	Doubles
- Bratislava Open

This was the first edition of the tournament.

Norbert Gombos won the title after defeating Attila Balázs 6–3, 3–6, 6–2 in the final.

== Seeds ==
All seeds receive a bye into the second round.

1. (Slovakia) Martin Kližan (third round)
2. (Switzerland) Henri Laaksonen (second round)
3. (France) Corentin Moutet (second round)
4. (Slovakia) Jozef Kovalík (quarterfinals)
5. (Slovakia) Andrej Martin (quarterfinals)
6. (Slovenia) Blaž Rola (semifinals)
7. (Hungary) Attila Balázs (final)
8. (Slovakia) Norbert Gombos (champion)
9. (Russia) Alexey Vatutin (third round)
10. (France) Elliot Benchetrit (second round)
11. (Czech Republic) Zdeněk Kolář (third round)
12. (Austria) Lucas Miedler (third round)
13. (Egypt) Mohamed Safwat (quarterfinals)
14. (Portugal) Gonçalo Oliveira (second round)
15. (Belarus) Uladzimir Ignatik (third round)
16. (India) Sumit Nagal (semifinals)

== Draw ==
Key

- Q = Qualifier
- WC = Wild card
- LL = Lucky loser
- Alt = Alternate
- ITF = ITF entry
- PR = Protected ranking
- SR = Special ranking
- SE = Special exempt
- JE = Junior exempt
- JR = Junior Accelerator Programme entrant
- CO = College Accelerator Programme entrant
- NG = Next Gen Accelerator Program entrant
- w/o = Walkover
- r = Retired
- d = Defaulted

=== Finals ===
Quarterfinals
16	(India) Sumit Nagal	6	6
5	(Slovakia) Andrej Martin	4	2
4	(Slovakia) Jozef Kovalík	3	5
8	(Slovakia) Norbert Gombos	6	7
7	(Hungary) Attila Balázs	6	7^{7}
(Czech Republic) Václav Šafránek	4	6^{3}
6	(Slovenia) Blaž Rola	7^{7}	6
13	(Egypt) Mohamed Safwat	6^{2}	4

Semifinals
16	(India) Sumit Nagal	1	6	2
8	(Slovakia) Norbert Gombos	6	4	6
7	(Hungary) Attila Balázs	6	3	6
6	(Slovenia) Blaž Rola	2	6	3

Final
8	(Slovakia) Norbert Gombos	6	3	6
7	(Hungary) Attila Balázs	3	6	2

=== Top half ===
==== Section 1 ====
First round
WC	(Czech Republic) J Lehečka	4	4
Q	(Germany) Lucas Gerch	6	6
(Spain) G Granollers	7^{8}	6
(Russia) R Safiullin	6^{6}	4
(Croatia) N Serdarušić	6^{3}	2
(Czech Republic) A Pavlásek	7^{7}	6
(Germany) Jeremy Jahn	6	6^{6}	6
(Germany) Tobias Simon	4	7^{8}	1

Second round
1	(Slovakia) M Kližan	6	7
Q	(Germany) L Gerch	4	5
(Spain) G Granollers	3	1
16	(India) S Nagal	6	6
10	(France) E Benchetrit	6^{3}	2
(Czech Republic) A Pavlásek	7^{7}	6
(Germany) J Jahn	7^{7}	2	2
5	(Slovakia) A Martin	6^{5}	6	6

Third round
1	(Slovakia) M Kližan	6	1	6^{3}
16	(India) S Nagal	1	6	7^{7}
(Czech Republic) A Pavlásek	6	1	2
5	(Slovakia) A Martin	3	6	6

Quarterfinals
16	(India) S Nagal	6	6
5	(Slovakia) A Martin	4	2

==== Section 2 ====
First round
(United States) S Bangoura	6	7
Q	(Czech Republic) M Vrbenský	4	5
WC	(Czech Republic) J Forejtek	6	7^{8}
LL	(Ukraine) D Kalenichenko	4	6^{6}
ITF	(Czech Republic) V Kopřiva	5	4
WC	(Slovakia) L Klein	7	6
WC	(Hungary) Péter Makk	4	4
(Spain) R Ojeda Lara	6	6

Second round
4	(Slovakia) J Kovalík	6	6
(United States) S Bangoura	3	4
WC	(Czech Republic) J Forejtek	4	5
15	(Belarus) U Ignatik	6	7
12	(Austria) L Miedler	6	4	7
WC	(Slovakia) L Klein	4	6	5
(Spain) R Ojeda Lara	3	2
8	(Slovakia) N Gombos	6	6

Third round
4	(Slovakia) J Kovalík	3	7^{12}	6
15	(Belarus) U Ignatik	6	6^{10}	4
12	(Austria) L Miedler	7^{7}	1	4
8	(Slovakia) N Gombos	6^{4}	6	6

Quarterfinals
4	(Slovakia) J Kovalík	3	5
8	(Slovakia) N Gombos	6	7

=== Bottom half ===
==== Section 3 ====
First round
ITF	(Germany) Peter Heller	4	4
ITF	(Belgium) Jeroen Vanneste	6	6
(Russia) A Karatsev	6	6
(Romania) D Dima	0	1
(Bosnia and Herzegovina) T Brkić	2	6	0
(Portugal) F Ferreira Silva	6	3	6
(Czech Republic) V Šafránek	7	6
(France) H Grenier	5	3

Second round
7	(Hungary) A Balázs	7^{7}	6
ITF	(Belgium) J Vanneste	6^{5}	3
(Russia) A Karatsev	2	6^{5}
11	(Czech Republic) Z Kolář	6	7^{7}
14	(Portugal) G Oliveira	2	1
(Portugal) F Ferreira Silva	6	6
(Czech Republic) V Šafránek	4	7^{7}	6
3	(France) C Moutet	6	6^{4}	4

Third round
7	(Hungary) A Balázs	6	6^{5}	6
11	(Czech Republic) Z Kolář	3	7^{7}	2
(Portugal) F Ferreira Silva	1	6^{6}
(Czech Republic) V Šafránek	6	7^{8}

Quarterfinals
7	(Hungary) A Balázs	6	7^{7}
(Czech Republic) V Šafránek	4	6^{3}

==== Section 4 ====
First round
ITF	(Italy) Pietro Rondoni	6	3	4
(Germany) B Hassan	2	6	6
(Germany) S Fanselow	7^{7}	6
(Slovakia) A Molčan	6^{5}	3
WC	(Slovakia) David Juras	3	0
(Israel) B Patael	6	6
(El Salvador) M Arévalo	4	6	6
(Croatia) B Gojo	6	3	0

Second round
6	(Slovenia) B Rola	6	6
(Germany) B Hassan	3	4
(Germany) S Fanselow	4	4
9	(Russia) A Vatutin	6	6
13	(Egypt) M Safwat	6	6
(Israel) B Patael	2	1
(El Salvador) M Arévalo	6	4	6
2	(Switzerland) H Laaksonen	2	6	1

Third round
6	(Slovenia) B Rola	4	6	6
9	(Russia) A Vatutin	6	4	3
13	(Egypt) M Safwat	6^{6}	7^{7}	6
(El Salvador) M Arévalo	7^{8}	6^{5}	4

Quarterfinals
6	(Slovenia) B Rola	7^{7}	6
13	(Egypt) M Safwat	6^{2}	4
