= Lapscheure =

Coordinates: 51°17′N 3°21′E

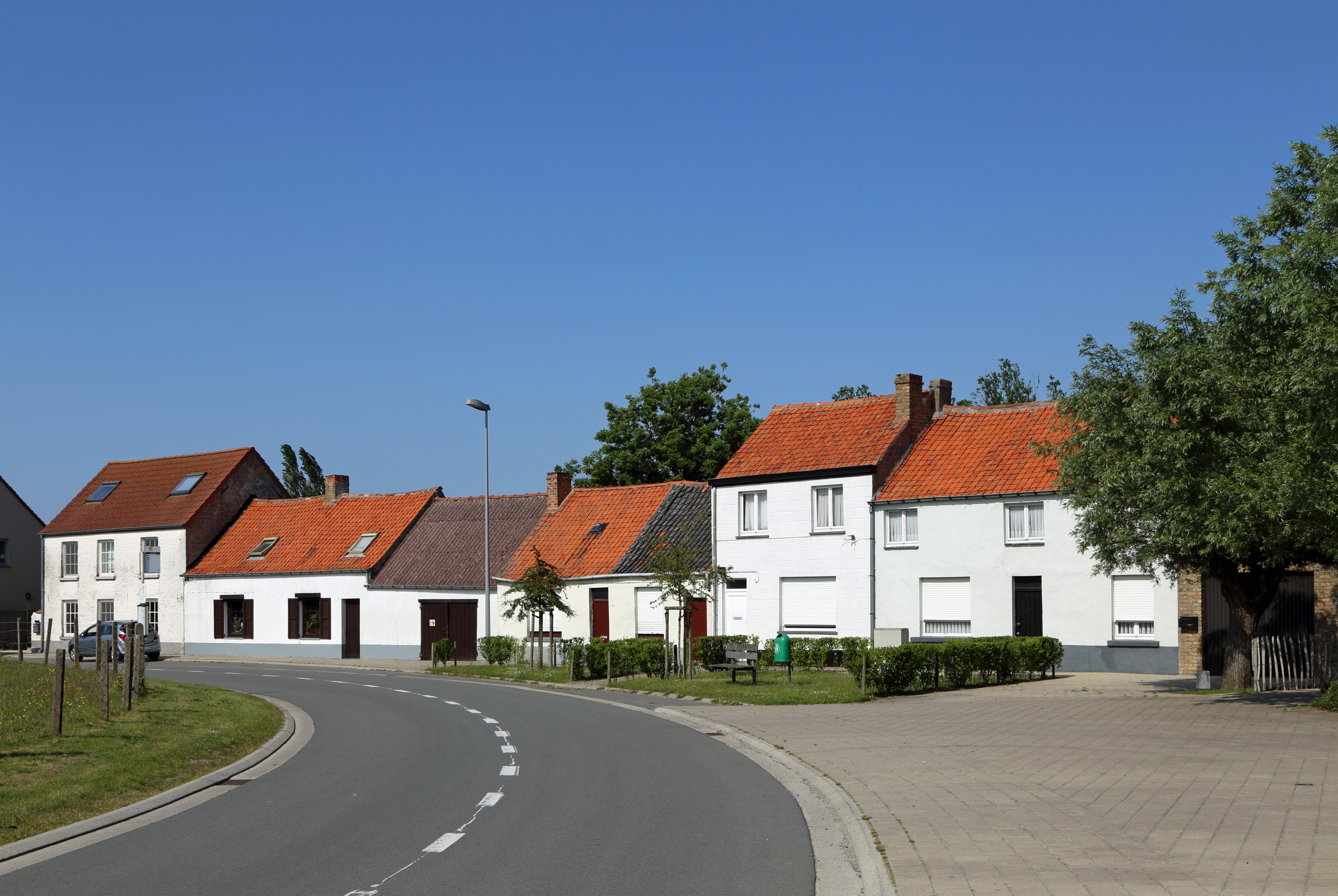

Lapscheure is a town in Damme, a municipality in the province of West Flanders, Belgium.
