= 2026 Advantage Cars Prague Open =

- Date: 17–22 August
- Edition: 33rd (men); 21st (women)
- Category: ATP Challenger Tour; ITF Women's World Tennis Tour
- Surface: Clay
- Location: Prague, Czech Republic

Champions

Men's singles
- (Czech Republic) Jan Kumstát

Women's singles
- (Czech Republic) Jana Kovačková

Men's doubles
- (Czech Republic) Andrew Paulson / (Belgium) Joran Vliegen

Women's doubles
- (Czech Republic) Alena Kovačková / (Czech Republic) Jana Kovačková
- Advantage Cars Prague Open

The 2026 Sekyra Group Prague Open by Advantage Cars was a professional tennis tournament played on outdoor clay courts. It was the 33rd (men) and 21st (women) editions of the tournament, which were part of the 2026 ATP Challenger Tour and the 2026 ITF Women's World Tennis Tour. It took place in Prague, Czech Republic between 17 and 22 August 2026.

== Champions ==
=== Men's singles ===
- (Czech Republic) Jan Kumstát def. (Chinese Taipei) Tseng Chun-hsin 5–7, 6–3, 6–0.

=== Women's singles ===
- (Czech Republic) Jana Kovačková def. (China) Gao Xinyu 6–1, 6–1

=== Men's doubles ===
- (Czech Republic) Andrew Paulson / (Belgium) Joran Vliegen def. (Sweden) Erik Grevelius / (Sweden) Adam Heinonen 6–4, 6–3.

=== Women's doubles ===
- (Czech Republic) Alena Kovačková / (Czech Republic) Jana Kovačková def. (Ukraine) Valeriya Strakhova / Anastasia Tikhonova 6–2, 6–3

== Men's singles main draw entrants ==
=== Seeds ===
Country	Player	Rank^{1}	Seed
~~UKR~~	~~Vitaliy Sachko~~	~~191~~	~~1~~
BEL	Kimmer Coppejans	218	2
BEL	Gilles-Arnaud Bailly	230	3
IND	Sumit Nagal	239	4
CZE	Martin Krumich	255	5
CHI	Matías Soto	262	6
ROU	Cezar Crețu	266	7
CZE	Hynek Bartoň	268	8

- ^{1} Rankings are as of 10 August 2026.

=== Other entrants ===
The following players received wildcards into the singles main draw:

- (Czech Republic) Jakub Filip
- (Czech Republic) Jakub Nicod
- (Czech Republic) Daniel Siniakov

The following player received entry into the singles main draw as a special exempt:

- (Czech Republic) Jan Kumstát

The following player received entry into the singles main draw through the Next Gen Accelerator programme:

- (France) Thomas Faurel

The following players received entry into the singles main draw as alternates:

- (Czech Republic) Marek Gengel
- (Brazil) Eduardo Ribeiro

The following players received entry from the qualifying draw:

- (Spain) Javier Barranco Cosano
- (Bosnia and Herzegovina) Nerman Fatić
- (Slovakia) Norbert Gombos
- (Ukraine) Oleksii Krutykh
- (Germany) Rudolf Molleker
- (Romania) Radu Mihai Papoe

The following player received entry as a lucky loser:

- (Slovakia) Andrej Martin
