= Hoeke =

Village in West Flanders, Belgium

Coordinates: 51°17′N 3°20′E

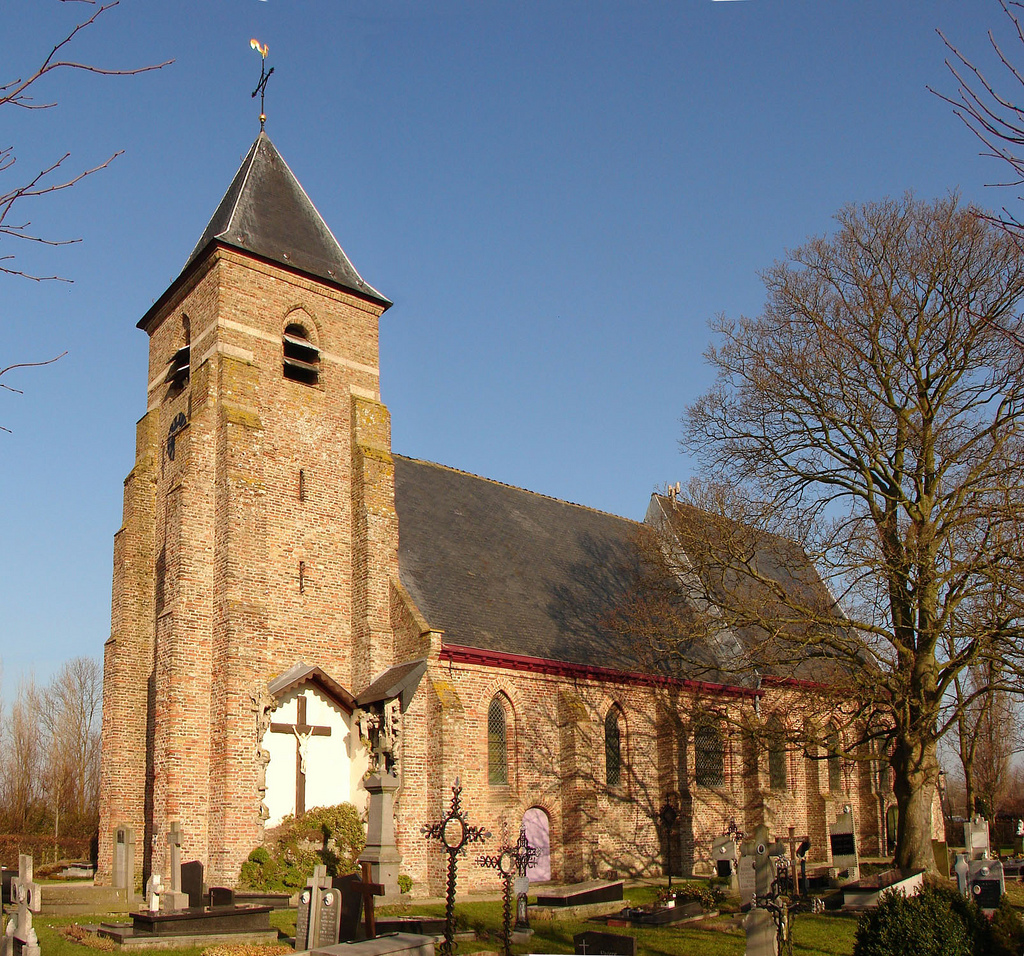

Hoeke is a village in Damme, a municipality in West Flanders, Belgium.
