= 2026 Svijany Open =

- Date: 27 July – 2 August
- Edition: 13th
- Location: Liberec, Czech Republic

Champions

Singles
- (Czech Republic) Jan Kumstát

Doubles
- (Spain) Íñigo Cervantes / (Ukraine) Denys Molchanov
- Svijany Open

The 2026 Svijany Open was a professional tennis tournament played on clay courts. It was the 13th edition of the tournament which was part of the 2026 ATP Challenger Tour. It took place in Liberec, Czech Republic between 27 July and 2 August 2026.

== Singles main-draw entrants ==
=== Seeds ===
Country	Player	Rank^{1}	Seed
CZE	Zdeněk Kolář	154	1
PER	Gonzalo Bueno	180	2
AUT	Joel Schwärzler	185	3
FRA	Harold Mayot	211	4
ARG	Guido Iván Justo	224	5
URU	Franco Roncadelli	228	6
IND	Sumit Nagal	230	7
POR	Frederico Ferreira Silva	235	8

- ^{1} Rankings are as of 20 July 2026.

=== Other entrants ===
The following players received wildcards into the singles main draw:

- (Czech Republic) Petr Brunclík
- (Czech Republic) Matyáš Černý
- (Czech Republic) Jan Kumstát

The following players received entry into the singles main draw as alternates:

- (Argentina) Luciano Emanuel Ambrogi
- (Argentina) Nicolás Kicker
- (Czech Republic) Maxim Mrva

The following players received entry from the qualifying draw:

- (Slovakia) Norbert Gombos
- (Slovakia) Andrej Martin
- (Spain) Pablo Martínez Gómez
- (Czech Republic) Jakub Nicod
- (Sweden) William Rejchtman Vinciguerra
- (Uzbekistan) Khumoyun Sultanov

== Champions ==
=== Singles ===
- (Czech Republic) Jan Kumstát def. (Peru) Gonzalo Bueno 6–3, 6–1.

=== Doubles ===
- (Spain) Íñigo Cervantes / (Ukraine) Denys Molchanov def. (Austria) Maximilian Neuchrist / (Czech Republic) David Poljak 7–6^{(9–7)}, 6–3.
