= Karel Verleye =

Capuchin friar, co-founder College of Europe (1920–2002)

- Born: 17 April 1920; Mechelen, Belgium
- Died: 27 February 2002 (aged 81); Damme (Sijsele), Belgium

Father Karel Verleye, OFMCap, (17 April 1920 – 27 February 2002) co-founded the College of Europe in Bruges in 1949 with his good friend Hendrik Brugmans.

He was a Capuchin friar for 64 years. In 1945 he became philosophy lector at the Bruges seminary. He founded the Ryckevelde Foundation in 1956.
