= 2019 Bratislava Open – Doubles =

Doubles
- 2019 Bratislava Open

Final
- Champions: (Belgium) Sander Gillé (Belgium) Joran Vliegen
- Runners-up: (Slovakia) Lukáš Klein (Slovakia) Alex Molčan
- Score: 6–2, 7–5

Events
Singles	Doubles
- Bratislava Open

This was the first edition of the tournament.

Sander Gillé and Joran Vliegen won the title after defeating Lukáš Klein and Alex Molčan 6–2, 7–5 in the final.

== Seeds ==
1. (Czech Republic) Roman Jebavý / (Slovakia) Igor Zelenay (semifinals)
2. (El Salvador) Marcelo Arévalo / (Mexico) Miguel Ángel Reyes-Varela (quarterfinals)
3. (Belgium) Sander Gillé / (Belgium) Joran Vliegen (champions)
4. (Spain) Gerard Granollers / (Portugal) Gonçalo Oliveira (first round)

== Draw ==
Key

- Q = Qualifier
- WC = Wild card
- LL = Lucky loser
- Alt = Alternate
- ITF = ITF entry
- PR = Protected ranking
- SR = Special ranking
- SE = Special exempt
- JE = Junior exempt
- JR = Junior Accelerator Programme entrant
- CO = College Accelerator Programme entrant
- NG = Next Gen Accelerator Program entrant
- w/o = Walkover
- r = Retired
- d = Defaulted

First round
1	(Czech Republic) R Jebavý (Slovakia) I Zelenay	7^{7}	6
(Austria) L Miedler (Slovenia) B Rola	6^{4}	4
WC	(Slovakia) I Klec (Slovakia) Dominik Šproch	7^{7}	6
Alt	(Czech Republic) V Kopřiva (Czech Republic) M Vrbenský	6^{5}	0
3	(Belgium) S Gillé (Belgium) J Vliegen	6	6
(Germany) Peter Heller (Spain) S Martos Gornés	3	4
WC	(Turkey) T Altuna (Hungary) A Balázs	6^{5}	4
(Bosnia and Herzegovina) T Brkić (Croatia) A Pavić	7^{7}	6
(Germany) Jeremy Jahn (Russia) A Karatsev	7	4	[13]
(Egypt) M Safwat (Austria) T-S Weissborn	5	6	[11]
(United States) N Lammons (Croatia) A Šančić	7^{7}	6
4	(Spain) G Granollers (Portugal) G Oliveira	6^{5}	3
WC	(Slovakia) L Klein (Slovakia) A Molčan	3	7^{7}	[11]
ITF	(Italy) Pietro Rondoni (Belgium) Jeroen Vanneste	6	6^{5}	[9]
(Australia) R Junaid (Canada) A Shamasdin	1	6	[4]
2	(El Salvador) M Arévalo (Mexico) MÁ Reyes-Varela	6	4	[10]

Quarterfinals
1	(Czech Republic) R Jebavý (Slovakia) I Zelenay	6	6
WC	(Slovakia) I Klec (Slovakia) D Šproch	1	1
3	(Belgium) S Gillé (Belgium) J Vliegen	6	7^{7}
(Bosnia and Herzegovina) T Brkić (Croatia) A Pavić	4	6^{2}
(Germany) J Jahn (Russia) A Karatsev	6^{4}	3
(United States) N Lammons (Croatia) A Šančić	7^{7}	6
WC	(Slovakia) L Klein (Slovakia) A Molčan	2	6	[10]
2	(El Salvador) M Arévalo (Mexico) MÁ Reyes-Varela	6	3	[7]

Semifinals
1	(Czech Republic) R Jebavý (Slovakia) I Zelenay	5	4
3	(Belgium) S Gillé (Belgium) J Vliegen	7	6
(United States) N Lammons (Croatia) A Šančić	5	3
WC	(Slovakia) L Klein (Slovakia) A Molčan	7	6

Final
3	(Belgium) S Gillé (Belgium) J Vliegen	6	7
WC	(Slovakia) L Klein (Slovakia) A Molčan	2	5
