= 2019 Bratislava Open =

- Date: 17–23 June
- Edition: 1st
- Draw: 48S / 4Q / 16D
- Surface: Clay
- Location: Bratislava, Slovakia

Champions

Singles
- (Slovakia) Norbert Gombos

Doubles
- (Belgium) Sander Gillé / (Belgium) Joran Vliegen
- Bratislava Open

The 2019 Bratislava Open was a professional tennis tournament played on clay courts. It was the first edition of the tournament which was part of the 2019 ATP Challenger Tour. It took place in Bratislava, Slovakia between 17 and 23 June 2019.

== Singles main-draw entrants ==
=== Seeds ===
Country	Player	Rank^{1}	Seed
SVK	Martin Kližan	55	1
SUI	Henri Laaksonen	94	2
FRA	Corentin Moutet	102	3
SVK	Jozef Kovalík	142	4
SVK	Andrej Martin	154	5
SLO	Blaž Rola	169	6
HUN	Attila Balázs	197	7
SVK	Norbert Gombos	200	8
RUS	Alexey Vatutin	208	9
FRA	Elliot Benchetrit	223	10
CZE	Zdeněk Kolář	226	11
AUT	Lucas Miedler	235	12
EGY	Mohamed Safwat	248	13
POR	Gonçalo Oliveira	260	14
BLR	Uladzimir Ignatik	263	15
IND	Sumit Nagal	272	16

- ^{1} Rankings are as of 10 June 2019.

=== Other entrants ===
The following players received wildcards into the singles main draw:

- (Czech Republic) Jonáš Forejtek
- (Slovakia) David Juras
- (Slovakia) Lukáš Klein
- (Czech Republic) Jiří Lehečka
- (Hungary) Péter Makk

The following players received entry into the singles main draw using their ITF World Tennis Ranking:

- (Germany) Peter Heller
- (Czech Republic) Vít Kopřiva
- (Tunisia) ~~Skander Mansouri~~
- (Italy) Pietro Rondoni
- (Belgium) Jeroen Vanneste

The following players received entry from the qualifying draw:

- (Germany) Lucas Gerch
- (Czech Republic) Michael Vrbenský

The following player received entry as a lucky loser:

- (Ukraine) Danylo Kalenichenko

== Champions ==
=== Singles ===
- (Slovakia) Norbert Gombos def. (Hungary) Attila Balázs 6–3, 3–6, 6–2.

=== Doubles ===
- (Belgium) Sander Gillé / (Belgium) Joran Vliegen def. (Slovakia) Lukáš Klein / (Slovakia) Alex Molčan 6–2, 7–5.
