= 2026 Svijany Open – Singles =

Singles
- 2026 Svijany Open

Final
- Champion: (Czech Republic) Jan Kumstát
- Runner-up: (Peru) Gonzalo Bueno
- Score: 6–3, 6–1

Events
Singles	Doubles
- Svijany Open

Gonzalo Bueno was the defending champion but lost in the final to Jan Kumstát.

Kumstát won the title after defeating Bueno 6–3, 6–1 in the final. It was his maiden ATP Challenger title.

== Seeds ==
1. (Czech Republic) Zdeněk Kolář (first round)
2. (Peru) Gonzalo Bueno (final)
3. (Austria) Joel Schwärzler (second round)
4. (France) Harold Mayot (first round)
5. (Argentina) Guido Iván Justo (second round)
6. (Uruguay) Franco Roncadelli (second round)
7. (India) Sumit Nagal (semifinals)
8. (Portugal) Frederico Ferreira Silva (quarterfinals)

== Draw ==
Key

- Q = Qualifier
- WC = Wild card
- LL = Lucky loser
- Alt = Alternate
- ITF = ITF entry
- PR = Protected ranking
- SR = Special ranking
- SE = Special exempt
- JE = Junior exempt
- JR = Junior Accelerator Programme entrant
- CO = College Accelerator Programme entrant
- NG = Next Gen Accelerator Program entrant
- w/o = Walkover
- r = Retired
- d = Defaulted

=== Finals ===
Semifinals
WC	(Czech Republic) Jan Kumstát	7	6
7	(India) Sumit Nagal	5	4
Q	(Slovakia) Norbert Gombos	3	3
2	(Peru) Gonzalo Bueno	6	6

Final
WC	(Czech Republic) Jan Kumstát	6	6
2	(Peru) Gonzalo Bueno	3	1

=== Top half ===
First round
1	(Czech Republic) Z Kolář	2	6	3
WC	(Czech Republic) J Kumstát	6	4	6
Q	(Slovakia) A Martin	1	4
(Brazil) T Seyboth Wild	6	6
Alt	(Argentina) LE Ambrogi	2	4
Alt	(Argentina) N Kicker	6	6
(Poland) M Kaśnikowski	1	6	3
8	(Portugal) F Ferreira Silva	6	3	6
3	(Austria) J Schwärzler	6	6
Alt	(Czech Republic) M Mrva	3	4
(Czech Republic) M Krumich	2	6	6
(South Africa) P Henning	6	4	2
Q	(Sweden) W Rejchtman Vinciguerra	2	4
WC	(Czech Republic) Petr Brunclík	6	6
(Spain) I Montes de la Torre	3	3
7	(India) S Nagal	6	6

Second round
WC	(Czech Republic) J Kumstát	6	6
(Brazil) T Seyboth Wild	4	2
Alt	(Argentina) N Kicker	2	6	1
8	(Portugal) F Ferreira Silva	6	4	6
3	(Austria) J Schwärzler	2	3
(Czech Republic) M Krumich	6	6
WC	(Czech Republic) P Brunclík	4	4
7	(India) S Nagal	6	6

Quarterfinals
WC	(Czech Republic) J Kumstát	6	7
8	(Portugal) F Ferreira Silva	4	5
(Czech Republic) M Krumich	3	2
7	(India) S Nagal	6	6

Semifinals
WC	(Czech Republic) J Kumstát	7	6
7	(India) S Nagal	5	4

=== Bottom half ===
First round
6	(Uruguay) F Roncadelli	6	6
Q	(Czech Republic) Jakub Nicod	3	2
Q	(Slovakia) N Gombos	6	4	6
WC	(Czech Republic) Matyáš Černý	1	6	2
(Croatia) D Ajduković	7^{7}	0
Q	(Uzbekistan) K Sultanov	6^{3}	0^{r}
(Switzerland) K Feldbausch	6	6^{6}	6
4	(France) H Mayot	3	7^{8}	4
5	(Argentina) GI Justo	6	6
(France) S Gueymard Wayenburg	4	4
(Italy) M Ribecai	6	5	2
(Argentina) JB Torres	3	7	6
(Czech Republic) H Bartoň	7^{7}	6
(Bosnia and Herzegovina) A Nedić	6^{3}	2
Q	(Spain) Pablo Martínez Gómez	6^{5}	4
2	(Peru) G Bueno	7^{7}	6

Second round
6	(Uruguay) F Roncadelli	5	5
Q	(Slovakia) N Gombos	7	7
(Croatia) D Ajduković	3	3
(Switzerland) K Feldbausch	6	6
5	(Argentina) GI Justo	3	3
(Argentina) JB Torres	6	6
(Czech Republic) H Bartoň	5	5
2	(Peru) G Bueno	7	7

Quarterfinals
Q	(Slovakia) N Gombos	4	6	6
(Switzerland) K Feldbausch	6	1	1
(Argentina) JB Torres	2^{r}
2	(Peru) G Bueno	5

Semifinals
Q	(Slovakia) N Gombos	3	3
2	(Peru) G Bueno	6	6
