= Joran Vliegen =

Belgian tennis player (born 1993)

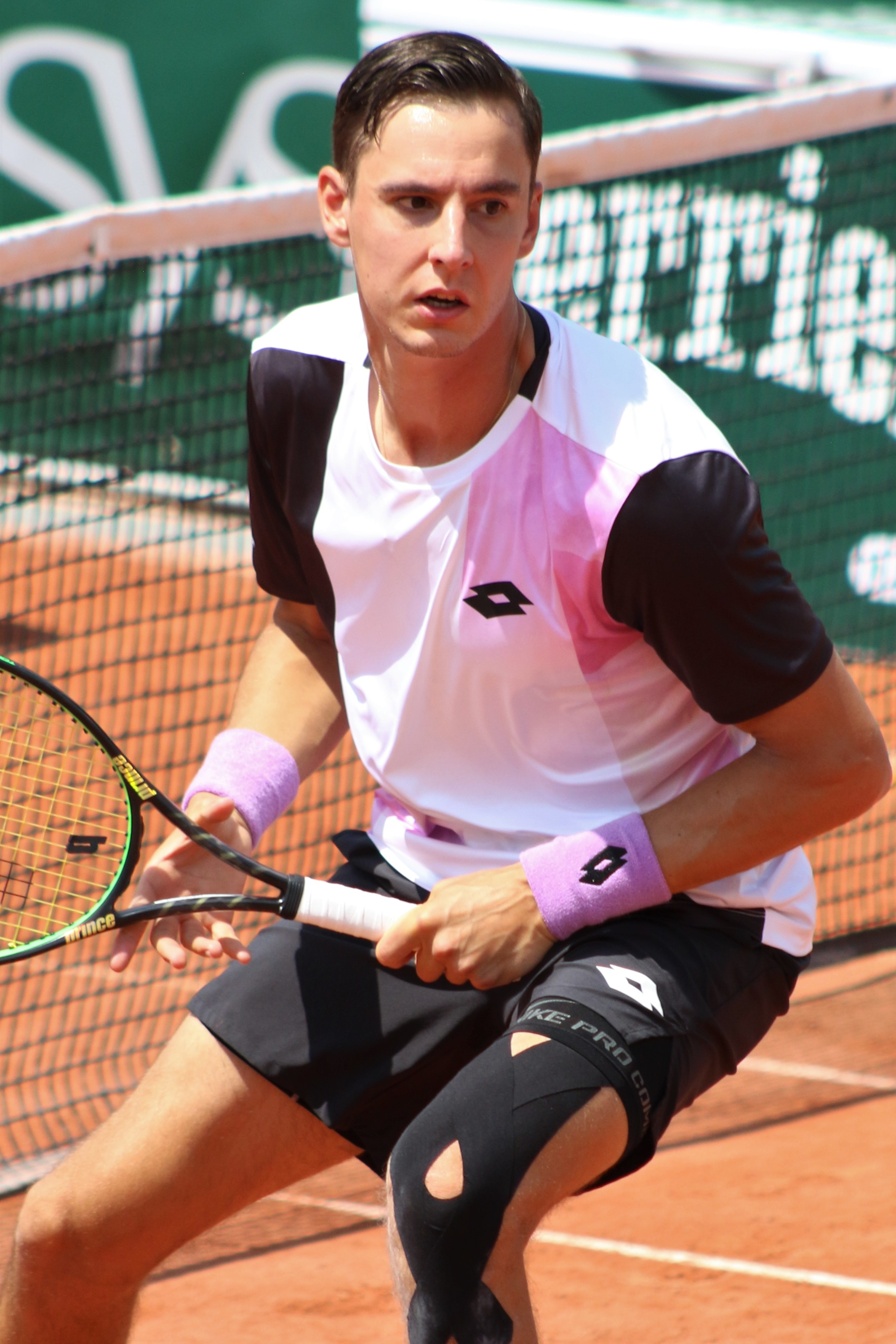
- Vliegen at the 2021 French Open
- Country (sports): Belgium
- Residence: Maaseik, Belgium
- Born: 7 July 1993 (age 33) Maaseik, Belgium
- Height: 1.91 m (6 ft 3 in)
- Turned pro: 2014
- Plays: Left-handed
- College: ECU
- Prize money: US $2,353,880

Singles
- Career record: 0–0
- Career titles: 0
- Highest ranking: No. 508 (1 August 2016)

Doubles
- Career record: 162–172
- Career titles: 8
- Highest ranking: No. 17 (7 August 2023)
- Current ranking: No. 124 (16 November 2026)

Grand Slam doubles results
- Australian Open: 2R (2020)
- French Open: F (2023)
- Wimbledon: 3R (2023)
- US Open: QF (2020)

Other doubles tournaments
- Olympic Games: 1R (2021, 2024)

Grand Slam mixed doubles results
- Australian Open: QF (2020)
- French Open: F (2022)
- Wimbledon: F (2023)
- US Open: QF (2023)
- Last updated on: 16 November 2026.

Joran Vliegen (born 7 July 1993) is a Belgian professional tennis player who specializes in doubles. He has a career high ATP doubles ranking of World No. 17 achieved on 7 August 2023 and a career high singles ranking of World No. 508 achieved on 1 August 2016. Vliegen has won eight ATP Tour doubles titles with partner Sander Gillé, including an ATP Masters 1000 title at the 2024 Monte-Carlo Masters.

== Early life and background ==
Vliegen was born in Maaseik, Belgium to parents Ivo Vliegen and Annick Desender. He has a brother named Warre. He started playing tennis at the age of five. In 2011 he moved to the United States to play college tennis at East Carolina University. He was named 2014 Conference USA Player of the Year. He earned undergraduate and graduate degrees in business.

He is not related to fellow Belgian tennis player Kristof Vliegen.

== Career ==
=== 2018: Davis Cup debut ===
Vliegen made his debut with the Belgium Davis Cup team in 2018. In the quarterfinals against the United States, he and fellow Belgian Sander Gillé lost against Ryan Harrison and Jack Sock.

=== 2019: Major debut and first quarterfinal, Three ATP titles ===
In 2019 he and Gillé managed to pull off a surprise win over Brazil's Marcelo Melo and Bruno Soares in the Belgium-Brazil Davis cup tie contributing to Belgium qualifying for the 2019 Davis Cup Finals held in November.

Vliegen made his Grand Slam debut in the 2019 French Open, partnering Mikhail Kukushkin from Kazakhstan, where they managed to reach the quarterfinals. At Wimbledon 2019, Vliegen made his debut in a mixed doubles event, and reached the third round with Zheng Saisai from China.

Vliegen won his first ATP Tour doubles title at the 2019 Swedish Open with fellow Belgian Sander Gillé. One week later, again partnering with Gillé, he also won the title at the Swiss Open. The duo continued their winning streak by reaching the final of the Austrian Open, losing to Philipp Oswald and Filip Polášek. Two months later, Vliegen and Gillé picked up their third title of 2019 at the Zhuhai Championships.

=== 2020–2021: Second Major quarterfinal, Masters semifinal, Olympics, top 30 ===
Vliegen won two more titles with his partner Sander Gillé at the 2020 Astana Open and at the 2021 Singapore Open. They also reached the quarterfinals at the 2020 US Open (tennis) losing to the eventual runners-up Mektic/Koolhof, their best showing at the Grand Slam thus far. The pair made their first Masters 1000 semifinal at the 2021 Mutua Madrid Open losing to the 2nd seeded pair of Pavic/Mektic. As a result, Vliegen reached a career-high of No. 31 on 10 May 2021.

=== 2022: Grand Slam mixed doubles final ===
At the 2022 French Open, Vliegen and Gillé caused an upset by eliminating the defending champions and home favorites Pierre Hugues Herbert and Nicolas Mahut in three tight sets without dropping one service game. In the second round they saw off the Australian pairing of Luke Saville and Jordan Thompson before falling to the unseeded pairing of Rafael Matos and David Vega Hernández in a third super match tie-break.

He also entered the mixed doubles event for the first time, partnering Norwegian Ulrikke Eikeri. In the first round they won against the Kazakh pairing of Anna Danilina and Andrey Golubev in three sets. In the second round they progressed past the home team of Clara Burel and Hugo Gaston in straight sets. In the third round they faced 2021 Wimbledon champions Desirae Krawczyk and Neal Skupski and lost the first set comprehensively before bouncing back to win the second set in the tie-break and the third set match tie-break. Their semifinal followed a similar pattern, this time against 2018 Wimbledon champion Nicole Melichar and twice French Open Men's doubles champion Kevin Krawietz, with them again bouncing back from a poor first set to win the second in the tie-break and the third set match tie-break to reach their first Grand Slam final. They lost in the final to Ena Shibahara and Wesley Koolhof. This made Vliegen the first Belgian man to reach the final of a mixed doubles event of a Grand Slam tournament.

=== 2023: Major doubles final, second mixed doubles final, top 20 ===
At the 2023 French Open, Vliegen having never get passed the quarterfinals at this Major, partnering Gillé as an unseeded pair, they reached their first Major semifinal defeating fourth seeds Croatians Nikola Mektić/Mate Pavić, Roman Jebavý/Luis David Martínez, ninth seeds Santiago González/Édouard Roger-Vasselin, 14th seed Argentines Andrés Molteni/Máximo González and 12th seeds Andreas Mies/Matwé Middelkoop. In the final they lost to Ivan Dodig and Austin Krajicek in straight sets. At Wimbledon, he and Gillé lost in the third round of the men's doubles event, while Vliegen paired with Xu Yifan in mixed doubles to reach his second career final. This made him the first Belgian man in a Wimbledon mixed doubles final He made his top 20 debut on 7 August 2023 at world No. 17.

=== 2024–2025: Masters title, new partnership with Behar ===
At the 2024 Monte-Carlo Masters with Gille, they defeated wildcard pair of Jannik Sinner and Lorenzo Sonego, defending champions and second seeds Austin Krajicek and Ivan Dodig in the second round, and sixth seeds Tim Pütz and Kevin Krawietz to reach the semifinals. They reached their first Masters 1000 final upsetting third seeds Horacio Zeballos and Marcel Granollers. They won their first Masters title defeating alternate pair of Alexander Zverev and Marcelo Melo. They became just the second and third Belgians to win a Masters 1000 doubles title after Xavier Malisse won in Indian Wells in 2010.

== Significant finals ==
=== Grand slam finals ===
==== Doubles: 1 (runner-up) ====
Result	Year	Tournament	Surface	Partner	Opponents	Score
Loss	2023	French Open	Clay	(Belgium) Sander Gillé	(Croatia) Ivan Dodig (United States) Austin Krajicek	3–6, 1–6

==== Mixed doubles: 2 (2 runner-ups) ====
Result	Year	Tournament	Surface	Partner	Opponents	Score
Loss	2022	French Open	Clay	(Norway) Ulrikke Eikeri	(Japan) Ena Shibahara (Netherlands) Wesley Koolhof	6–7^{(5–7)}, 2–6
Loss	2023	Wimbledon	Grass	(China) Xu Yifan	(Ukraine) Lyudmyla Kichenok (Croatia) Mate Pavić	4–6, 7–6^{(11–9)}, 3–6

=== Masters 1000 finals ===
==== Doubles: 1 (title) ====
Outcome	Year	Championship	Surface	Partner	Opponents	Score
Win	2024	Monte Carlo	Clay	(Belgium) Sander Gillé	(Brazil) Marcelo Melo (Germany) Alexander Zverev	5–7, 6–3, [10–5]

== ATP career finals ==
=== Doubles: 15 (8 titles, 7 runner-ups) ===
Legend Grand Slam tournaments (0–1) ATP World Tour Finals (0–0) ATP World Tour Masters 1000 (1–0) ATP World Tour 500 Series (0–1) ATP World Tour 250 Series (7–5)	Titles by surface Hard (4–1) Clay (4–5) Grass (0–1)	Titles by setting Outdoor (6–7) Indoor (2–0)

Result	W–L	Date	Tournament	Tier	Surface	Partner	Opponents	Score
Win	1–0	Jul 2019	Swedish Open, Sweden	250 Series	Clay	(Belgium) Sander Gillé	(Argentina) Federico Delbonis (Argentina) Horacio Zeballos	6–7^{(5–7)}, 7–5, [10–5]
Win	2–0	Jul 2019	Swiss Open, Switzerland	250 Series	Clay	(Belgium) Sander Gillé	(Austria) Philipp Oswald (Slovakia) Filip Polášek	6–4, 6–3
Loss	2–1	Aug 2019	Austrian Open, Austria	250 Series	Clay	(Belgium) Sander Gillé	(Austria) Philipp Oswald (Slovakia) Filip Polášek	4–6, 4–6
Win	3–1	Sep 2019	Zhuhai Championships, China	250 Series	Hard	(Belgium) Sander Gillé	(Brazil) Marcelo Demoliner (Netherlands) Matwé Middelkoop	7–6^{(7–2)}, 7–6^{(7–4)}
Win	4–1	Nov 2020	Astana Open, Kazakhstan	250 Series	Hard (i)	(Belgium) Sander Gillé	(Australia) Max Purcell (Australia) Luke Saville	7–5, 6–3
Win	5–1	Feb 2021	Singapore Open, Singapore	250 Series	Hard (i)	(Belgium) Sander Gillé	(Australia) Matthew Ebden (Australia) John-Patrick Smith	6–2, 6–3
Loss	5–2	May 2021	Bavarian Championships, Germany	250 Series	Clay	(Belgium) Sander Gillé	(Netherlands) Wesley Koolhof (Germany) Kevin Krawietz	6–4, 4–6, [5–10]
Win	6–2	Jan 2023	Maharashtra Open, India	250 Series	Hard	(Belgium) Sander Gillé	(India) Sriram Balaji (India) Jeevan Nedunchezhiyan	6–4, 6–4
Win	7–2	Apr 2023	Estoril Open, Portugal	250 Series	Clay	(Belgium) Sander Gillé	(Serbia) Nikola Ćaćić (Serbia) Miomir Kecmanović	6–3, 6–4
Loss	7–3	Jun 2023	French Open, France	Grand Slam	Clay	(Belgium) Sander Gillé	(Croatia) Ivan Dodig (United States) Austin Krajicek	3–6, 1–6
Loss	7–4	Jul 2023	Hamburg European Open, Germany	500 Series	Clay	(Belgium) Sander Gillé	(Germany) Kevin Krawietz (Germany) Tim Pütz	6–7^{(4–7)}, 3–6
Loss	7–5	Jan 2024	Hong Kong Open, Hong Kong	250 Series	Hard	(Belgium) Sander Gillé	(El Salvador) Marcelo Arévalo (Croatia) Mate Pavić	6–7^{(3–7)}, 4–6
Win	8–5	Apr 2024	Monte-Carlo Masters, Monaco	Masters 1000	Clay	(Belgium) Sander Gillé	(Brazil) Marcelo Melo (Germany) Alexander Zverev	5–7, 6–3, [10–5]
Loss	8–6	May 2025	Geneva Open, Switzerland	250 Series	Clay	(Uruguay) Ariel Behar	(France) Sadio Doumbia (France) Fabien Reboul	7–6^{(7–4)}, 4–6, [9–11]
Loss	8–7	Jun 2025	Eastbourne International, United Kingdom	250 Series	Grass	(Uruguay) Ariel Behar	(United Kingdom) Julian Cash (United Kingdom) Lloyd Glasspool	4–6, 6–7^{(5–7)}

== Challenger and Futures Finals ==
=== Singles: 3 (2–1) ===
Legend (singles) ATP Challenger Tour (0–0) ITF Futures Tour (2–1)	Titles by surface Hard (1–0) Clay (1–1) Grass (0–0) Carpet (0–0)

Result	W–L	Date	Tournament	Tier	Surface	Opponent	Score
Win	1–0	Aug 2015	Belgium F8, Middelkerke	Futures	Hard	(Belgium) Julien Cagnina	4–6, 6–3, 7–6^{(7–2)}
Loss	1–1	Sep 2015	Belgium F14, Middelkerke	Futures	Clay	(Germany) Jeremy Jahn	3–6, 4–6
Win	2–1	Aug 2016	Belgium F11, Huy	Futures	Clay	(Belgium) Romain Barbosa	6–4, 6–4

=== Doubles: 61 (45–16) ===
Legend (doubles) ATP Challenger Tour (22–9) ITF Futures Tour (23–7)	Titles by surface Hard (14–5) Clay (29–10) Grass (0–0) Carpet (2–1)

Result	W–L	Date	Tournament	Tier	Surface	Partner	Opponents	Score
Win	1–0	Jul 2013	Belgium F6, Heist	Futures	Clay	(Belgium) Cedric De Zutter	(Netherlands) Bobbie De Goeijen (Netherlands) Scott Griekspoor	7–5, 6–2
Win	2–0	Aug 2013	Belgium F8, Eupen	Futures	Clay	(Belgium) Sander Gillé	(Argentina) Gustavo Gómez Buyatti (France) Antoine Hoang	6–3, 6–3
Win	3–0	Aug 2014	Belgium F11, Koksijde	Futures	Clay	(Belgium) Sander Gillé	(Australia) Jake Eames (Spain) David Pérez Sanz	3–6, 6–3, [12–10]
Win	4–0	Jun 2015	Belgium F2, Damme	Futures	Clay	(Belgium) Sander Gillé	(France) Antoine Hoang (Luxembourg) Ugo Nastasi	6–2, 6–3
Loss	4–1	Jun 2015	Belgium F3, Havré	Futures	Clay	(Belgium) Sander Gillé	(United States) Deiton Baughman (Brazil) Fabrício Neis	6–2, 4–6, [2–10]
Win	5–1	Jul 2015	Belgium F7, Duinbergen	Futures	Clay	(Belgium) Sander Gillé	(Belgium) Julien Cagnina (Belgium) Jonas Merckx	6–7^{(5–7)}, 6–4, [10–6]
Loss	5–2	Aug 2015	Belgium F8, Middelkerke	Futures	Hard	(Belgium) Sander Gillé	(Netherlands) Sander Arends (Uruguay) Ariel Behar	7–6^{(7–1)}, 4–6, [7–10]
Loss	5–3	Aug 2015	Belgium F9, Eupen	Futures	Clay	(Belgium) Sander Gillé	(United Kingdom) Billy Harris (United Kingdom) Evan Hoyt	6–7^{(5–7)}, 3–6
Win	6–3	Aug 2015	Belgium F10, Koksijde	Futures	Clay	(Belgium) Sander Gillé	(United Kingdom) Evan Hoyt (United Kingdom) Toby Martin	6–2, 6–1
Win	7–3	Aug 2015	Belgium F11, Jupille-sur-Meuse	Futures	Clay	(Belgium) Sander Gillé	(United Kingdom) Evan Hoyt (United Kingdom) Toby Martin	6–1, 6–4
Win	8–3	Aug 2015	Belgium F12, Ostend	Futures	Clay	(France) Antoine Hoang	(Netherlands) Kevin Benning (Belgium) Jonas Merckx	6–2, 7–5
Win	9–3	Sep 2015	Belgium F14, Middelkerke	Futures	Clay	(Portugal) Gonçalo Oliveira	(Germany) Timon Reichelt (Germany) George von Massow	6–3, 3–6, [10–4]
Win	10–3	Oct 2015	Norway F2, Oslo	Futures	Hard (i)	(Belgium) Sander Gillé	(Croatia) Ivan Sabanov (Croatia) Matej Sabanov	6–7^{(4–7)}, 7–6^{(7–5)}, [10–8]
Win	11–3	Nov 2015	Norway F3, Oslo	Futures	Hard (i)	(Belgium) Sander Gillé	(Croatia) Ivan Sabanov (Croatia) Matej Sabanov	7–6^{(7–3)}, 6–1
Win	12–3	Jan 2016	France F2, Bressuire	Futures	Hard (i)	(Belgium) Sander Gillé	(France) Benjamin Bonzi (France) Grégoire Jacq	7–6^{(7–1)}, 7–5
Win	13–3	Jan 2016	France F3, Veigy-Foncenex	Futures	Carpet (i)	(Belgium) Sander Gillé	(United Kingdom) Scott Clayton (United Kingdom) Richard Gabb	6–7^{(4–7)}, 7–6^{(8–6)}, [10–7]
Loss	13–4	Mar 2016	Egypt F7, Sharm El Sheikh	Futures	Hard	(Belgium) Sander Gillé	(Czech Republic) Dominik Kellovský (Czech Republic) Jaroslav Pospíšil	6–3, 3–6, [11–13]
Win	14–4	Mar 2016	Egypt F8, Sharm El Sheikh	Futures	Hard	(Belgium) Sander Gillé	(Germany) Tom Schönenberg (Germany) Matthias Wunner	6–3, 7–6^{(7–2)}
Win	15–4	Apr 2016	Uzbekistan F2, Bukhara	Futures	Hard	(Belgium) Sander Gillé	(Russia) Evgeny Elistratov (Russia) Vitaly Kozyukov	6–4, 6–3
Win	16–4	May 2016	Ukraine F1, Cherkasy	Futures	Clay	(Belgium) Sander Gillé	(Switzerland) Antoine Bellier (Ukraine) Vladyslav Manafov	6–3, 4–6, [11–9]
Win	17–4	Jun 2016	Belgium F2, Havré	Futures	Clay	(Belgium) Sander Gillé	(Australia) Adam Taylor (Australia) Jason Taylor	6–2, 6–4
Win	18–4	Jul 2016	Belgium F3, Nieuwpoort	Futures	Clay	(Belgium) Sander Gillé	(Belgium) Stijn Meulemans (Belgium) Laurens Verboven	6–2, 6–3
Win	19–4	Jul 2016	Belgium F6, Knokke	Futures	Clay	(Belgium) Sander Gillé	(United States) Hunter Johnson (United States) Yates Johnson	6–4, 6–4
Win	20–4	Jul 2016	Belgium F7, Duinbergen	Futures	Clay	(Belgium) Sander Gillé	(Belgium) Michael Geerts (Belgium) Jeroen Vanneste	6–7^{(4–7)}, 6–3, [10–4]
Win	21–4	Aug 2016	Trnava, Slovakia	Challenger	Clay	(Belgium) Sander Gillé	(Poland) Tomasz Bednarek (Czech Republic) Roman Jebavý	6–2, 7–5
Loss	21–5	Aug 2016	Meerbusch, Germany	Challenger	Clay	(Belgium) Sander Gillé	(Russia) Mikhail Elgin (Belarus) Andrei Vasilevski	6–7^{(6–8)}, 4–6
Loss	21–6	Aug 2016	Belgium F11, Huy	Futures	Clay	(Belgium) Sander Gillé	(United Kingdom) Jarryd Bant (United Kingdom) Tom Farquharson	3–6, 2–6
Loss	21–7	Jan 2017	Germany F2, Kaarst	Futures	Carpet (i)	(Netherlands) David Pel	(Germany) Jannis Kahlke (Germany) Oscar Otte	3–6, 7–5, [8–10]
Win	22–7	Jan 2017	France F3, Veigy-Foncenex	Futures	Carpet (i)	(Belgium) Julien Dubail	(Netherlands) Antal van der Duim (Netherlands) Tim van Terheijden	4–6, 6–4, [10–4]
Loss	22–8	Mar 2017	Turkey F10, Antalya	Futures	Clay	(Belgium) Sander Gillé	(Turkey) Tuna Altuna (Turkey) Cem İlkel	6–0, 2–6, [8–10]
Win	23–8	May 2017	Italy F12, Naples	Futures	Clay	(Belgium) Sander Gillé	(Netherlands) Antal van der Duim (Netherlands) Boy Westerhof	6–4, 6–2
Win	24–8	May 2017	Romania F1, Bucharest	Futures	Clay	(Belgium) Sander Gillé	(Romania) Andrei Ștefan Apostol (Romania) Nicolae Frunză	7–6^{(7–5)}, 6–2
Win	25–8	Jun 2017	Lyon, France	Challenger	Clay	(Belgium) Sander Gillé	(Germany) Gero Kretschmer (Germany) Alexander Satschko	6–7^{(2–7)}, 7–6^{(7–2)}, [14–12]
Win	26–8	Jun 2017	Blois, France	Challenger	Clay	(Belgium) Sander Gillé	(Argentina) Máximo González (Brazil) Fabrício Neis	3–6, 6–3, [10–7]
Win	27–8	Jul 2017	Scheveningen, Netherlands	Challenger	Clay	(Belgium) Sander Gillé	(Slovakia) Jozef Kovalík (Greece) Stefanos Tsitsipas	6–2, 4–6, [12–10]
Win	28–8	Jul 2017	Tampere, Finland	Challenger	Clay	(Belgium) Sander Gillé	(Mexico) Lucas Gómez (Argentina) Juan Ignacio Londero	6–2, 6–7^{(5–7)}, [10–3]
Loss	28–9	Sep 2017	Sibiu, Romania	Challenger	Clay	(Belgium) Sander Gillé	(Italy) Marco Cecchinato (Italy) Matteo Donati	3–6, 1–6
Loss	28–10	Sep 2017	Rome, Italy	Challenger	Clay	(Belgium) Sander Gillé	(Slovakia) Martin Kližan (Slovakia) Jozef Kovalík	3–6, 6–7^{(5–7)}
Win	29–10	Jan 2018	Rennes, France	Challenger	Hard (i)	(Belgium) Sander Gillé	(Netherlands) Sander Arends (Croatia) Antonio Šančić	6–3, 6–7^{(1–7)}, [10–7]
Loss	29–11	Feb 2018	Quimper, France	Challenger	Hard (i)	(Belgium) Sander Gillé	(United Kingdom) Ken Skupski (United Kingdom) Neal Skupski	3–6, 6–3, [7–10]
Loss	29–12	May 2018	Rome, Italy	Challenger	Clay	(Belgium) Sander Gillé	(Germany) Kevin Krawietz (Germany) Andreas Mies	3–6, 6–2, [4–10]
Win	30–12	Jul 2018	Prague, Czech Republic	Challenger	Clay	(Belgium) Sander Gillé	(Brazil) Fernando Romboli (Spain) David Vega Hernández	6–4, 6–2
Win	31–12	Aug 2018	Liberec, Czech Republic	Challenger	Clay	(Belgium) Sander Gillé	(Slovakia) Filip Polášek (Czech Republic) Patrik Rikl	6–3, 6–4
Win	32–12	Aug 2018	Pullach, Germany	Challenger	Clay	(Belgium) Sander Gillé	(Italy) Daniele Bracciali (Italy) Simone Bolelli	6–2, 6–2
Win	33–12	Oct 2018	Ortisei, Italy	Challenger	Hard (i)	(Belgium) Sander Gillé	(India) Purav Raja (Croatia) Antonio Šančić	3–6, 6–3, [10–3]
Win	34–12	Oct 2018	Brest, France	Challenger	Hard (i)	(Belgium) Sander Gillé	(India) Leander Paes (Mexico) Miguel Ángel Reyes-Varela	3–6, 6–4, [10–2]
Win	35–12	Nov 2018	Mouilleron-le-Captif, France	Challenger	Hard (i)	(Belgium) Sander Gillé	(Monaco) Romain Arneodo (France) Quentin Halys	6–3, 4–6, [10–2]
Loss	35–13	Jan 2019	Punta del Este, Uruguay	Challenger	Clay	(Belgium) Sander Gillé	(Argentina) Guido Andreozzi (Argentina) Guillermo Durán	2–6, 7–6^{(8–6)}, [8–10]
Loss	35–14	Mar 2019	Marbella, Spain	Challenger	Clay	(Belgium) Sander Gillé	(Germany) Kevin Krawietz (Germany) Andreas Mies	6–7^{(6–8)}, 6–2, [6–10]
Win	36–14	Jun 2019	Bratislava, Slovakia	Challenger	Clay	(Belgium) Sander Gillé	(Slovakia) Lukáš Klein (Slovakia) Alex Molčan	6–2, 7–5
Win	37–14	Sep 2022	Cassis, France	Challenger	Hard	(Belgium) Michael Geerts	(Monaco) Romain Arneodo (France) Albano Olivetti	6–4, 7–6^{(8–6)}
Win	38–14	Apr 2025	Estoril, Portugal	Challenger	Clay	(Uruguay) Ariel Behar	(Portugal) Francisco Cabral (Austria) Lucas Miedler	7–5, 6–3
Win	39–14	May 2025	Turin, Italy	Challenger	Clay	(Uruguay) Ariel Behar	(Netherlands) Robin Haase (Germany) Hendrik Jebens	6–2, 6–4
Loss	39–15	Jul 2025	Porto, Portugal	Challenger	Hard	(Colombia) Nicolás Barrientos	(United States) George Goldhoff (Chinese Taipei) Ray Ho	4–6, 4–6
Loss	39–16	Oct 2025	Roanne, France	Challenger	Hard (i)	(United States) Jackson Withrow	(United States) Vasil Kirkov (Netherlands) Bart Stevens	6–4, 1–6, [4–10]
Win	40–16	Jul 2026	Bunschoten, Netherlands	Challenger	Clay	(Czech Republic) Andrew Paulson	(Romania) Victor Vlad Cornea (Israel) Daniel Cukierman	7–6^{(7–5)}, 6–2
Win	41–16	Aug 2026	Prague, Czech Republic	Challenger	Clay	(Czech Republic) Andrew Paulson	(Sweden) Erik Grevelius (Sweden) Adam Heinonen	6–4, 6–3
Win	42–16	Oct 2026	Olbia, Italy	Challenger	Hard	(Netherlands) Jarno Jans	(Israel) Daniel Cukierman (Brazil) Fernando Romboli	6–3, 6–4
Win	43–16	Oct 2026	Sioux Falls, USA	Challenger	Hard (i)	(Netherlands) Jarno Jans	(Mexico) Miguel Ángel Reyes-Varela (United States) Reese Stalder	6–4, 7–6^{(9–7)}
Win	44–16	Nov 2026	Charlottesville, USA	Challenger	Hard (i)	(Netherlands) Jarno Jans	(United States) Daniel Milavsky (United States) Braden Shick	6–4, 6–4
Win	45–16	Nov 2026	Knoxville, USA	Challenger	Hard (i)	(Netherlands) Jarno Jans	(Ecuador) Andy Andrade (Denmark) Johannes Ingildsen	7–5, 6–3

== Performance timelines ==
Key
W	F	SF	QF	#R	RR	Q#	DNQ	A	NH

(W) winner; (F) finalist; (SF) semifinalist; (QF) quarterfinalist; (#R) rounds 4, 3, 2, 1; (RR) round-robin stage; (Q#) qualification round; (DNQ) did not qualify; (A) absent; (NH) not held; (SR) strike rate (events won / competed); (W–L) win–loss record.
To avoid confusion and double counting, these charts are updated at the conclusion of a tournament or when the player's participation has ended.

=== Doubles ===
Current through the 2026 Australian Open.

Tournament	2017	2018	2019	2020	2021	2022	2023	2024	2025	2026	SR	W–L	Win %
Grand Slam tournaments
Australian Open	A	A	A	2R	1R	1R	1R	1R	1R	1R	0 / 7	1–7	13%
French Open	A	A	QF	1R	3R	3R	F	QF	1R		0 / 7	14–7	67%
Wimbledon	A	Q2	2R	NH	1R	2R	3R	2R	1R		0 / 6	5–6	45%
US Open	A	A	1R	QF	2R	A	1R	2R	1R		0 / 6	4–6	44%
Win–loss	0–0	0–0	4–3	3–3	3–4	3–3	7–4	4–4	0–4	0–1	0 / 26	24–26	48%
ATP Tour Masters 1000
Indian Wells Masters	A	A	A	NH	2R	A	A	2R	1R		0 / 3	2–3	40%
Miami Open	A	A	A	NH	1R	1R	A	1R	2R		0 / 4	1–4	20%
Monte-Carlo Masters	A	A	A	NH	1R	1R	A	W	QF		1 / 4	6–3	67%
Madrid Open	A	A	A	NH	SF	A	A	2R	1R		0 / 3	3–3	50%
Rome Masters	A	A	A	2R	1R	1R	A	QF	A		0 / 4	3–4	43%
Canadian Open	A	A	A	NH	SF	A	2R	1R	A		0 / 3	4–3	57%
Cincinnati Masters	A	A	A	1R	1R	A	1R	1R	A		0 / 4	0–4	0%
Shanghai Masters	A	A	A	NH			1R	2R	A		0 / 2	1–2	33%
Paris Masters	A	A	1R	2R	QF	2R	A	1R	A		0 / 5	4–5	44%
Win–loss	0–0	0–0	0–1	2–3	8–8	1–4	1–3	10–8	2–4	0–0	1 / 32	24–31	44%
Career statistics
Tournaments	1	3	18	15	23	27	25	28	25	3	Career total: 168		
Titles	0	0	3	1	1	0	2	1	0	0	Career total: 8		
Finals	0	0	4	1	2	0	4	2	2	0	Career total: 15		
Overall win–loss	0–1	0–4	31–16	16–16	22–22	15–30	32–24	27–28	17–26	1–3	8 / 168	161–170	49%
Year-end ranking	117	85	39	36	32	61	25	31	66		$1,904,235		

=== Mixed doubles ===
Current through the 2025 Australian Open.

Tournament	2019	2020	2021	2022	2023	2024	2025	SR	W–L	Win %
Australian Open	A	QF	A	1R	A	2R	1R	0 / 4	3–4	43%
French Open	A	NH	A	F	A	2R (Note: Withdraw during the tournament. Not counted as a loss.)	A	0 / 2	5–1	83%
Wimbledon	3R	NH	A	1R	F	A	A	0 / 3	6–3	67%
US Open	1R	NH	2R	A	QF	2R	A	0 / 4	4–4	50%
Win–loss	2–2	2–1	1–1	4–3	6–2	3–2	0–1	0 / 13	18–12	60%
