= IsarOpen =

German professional tennis tournament

- 2018 IsarOpen

Defunct tennis tournament
- Event name: IsarOpen
- Location: Pullach, Germany
- Venue: TC Großhesselohe
- Category: ATP Challenger Tour
- Surface: Clay
- Draw: 32S/32Q/16D

The IsarOpen was a professional tennis tournament played on clay courts. It was part of the ATP Challenger Tour. The tournament was only held once in Pullach, Germany in 2018. Afterwards the tournament relocated to Augsburg, renamed as the Schwaben Open. The organizer, TG Großhesselohe, had achieved promotion of their men's team to the Tennis Bundesliga for the 2019 season and foresaw difficulties with conflicting dates, organization and focus if two big tennis events took place in summer.

== Past finals ==
=== Singles ===
| Year | Champion | Runner-up | Score |
|---|---|---|---|
| 2018 | (Portugal) Pedro Sousa | (Germany) Jan-Lennard Struff | 6–1, 6–3 |

=== Doubles ===
| Year | Champions | Runners-up | Score |
|---|---|---|---|
| 2018 | (Belgium) Sander Gillé (Belgium) Joran Vliegen | (Italy) Simone Bolelli (Italy) Daniele Bracciali | 6–2, 6–2 |
