= Jan Kumstát =

Czech tennis player (born 2007)

- Country (sports): Czech Republic
- Born: 2 January 2007 (age 19) Prostějov, Czech Republic
- Height: 1.98 m (6 ft 6 in)
- Plays: Right-handed (two-handed backhand)
- Prize money: US $120,665

Singles
- Career record: 0–0 (at ATP Tour level, Grand Slam level, and in Davis Cup)
- Career titles: 0
- Highest ranking: No. 161 (16 November 2026)
- Current ranking: No. 161 (16 November 2026)

Doubles
- Career record: 0–0 (at ATP Tour level, Grand Slam level, and in Davis Cup)
- Career titles: 0
- Highest ranking: No. 449 (28 September 2026)
- Current ranking: No. 512 (16 November 2026)
- Last updated on: 16 November 2026.

Jan Kumstát (born 2 January 2007) is a Czech tennis player. He has a career-high ATP singles ranking of No. 161 achieved on 16 November 2026 and a doubles ranking of No. 449 achieved on 28 September 2026.

Kumstát won the boys' doubles title at the 2025 Australian Open.

== Junior career ==
In the summer of 2022, Kumstát won gold in the singles at the European Youth Olympic Festival in Banská Bystrica.

He was part of the Czech team that won the 2023 Junior Davis Cup.

He made his Junior Grand Slam debut at the 2024 Australian Open. He defeated local opponent Hayden Jones on his way to reaching the final, where he lost to Japanese Rei Sakamoto. He also reached the quarterfinals in the doubles category, with Norwegian Nicolai Budkov Kjær.

Playing with compatriot Jan Klimas, Kumstát was a runner-up in the boys' doubles event at the 2024 Wimbledon Championships. The pair was defeated by Alexander Razeghi and Max Schönhaus in the final.

Kumstát went into the 2025 Australian Open as the highest-ranked junior in the tournament. He reached the quarterfinals in boys' singles, but lost to Swiss Henry Bernet. Despite that loss, a few days later he reached the doubles final in Melbourne, with American Maxwell Exsted. They were crowned champions of that event, defeating Ognjen Milić and Egor Pleshivtsev in straight sets.

Kumstát also had good results on the ITF junior circuit, maintaining a 76–40 singles win-loss record and reached an ITF junior combined ranking of world No. 3 on 6 January 2025.

== Professional career ==
=== 2025: Pro beginnings ===
Playing on Pro Tour Kumstát reached his first two ITF singles finals at back to back events in Italy and Slovenia. In doubles he played another two finals with fellow Czech players David Poljak and Denis Peták.

He also made his ATP Challenger Tour debut in Ostrava defeating Murphy Cassone in the first round.

=== 2026: Three successive Challenger titles, top 200 ===
In August, he won his second ATP Challenger title at the 2026 Hamburg Ladies & Gents Cup, following his triumph on home soil in Liberec, earlier in the month. As a result, he reached the top 250, raising 100 positions in the ATP singles rankings on 24 August 2026. He won his third Challenger title in a row as a teenager, the third to accomplish the feat after Guillermo Coria and Grigor Dimitrov, at home at the 2026 Sekyra Group Prague Open by Advantage Cars and reached the top 200 on 24 August 2026.

== Personal life ==
Kumstát is from Prostějov, Czechia. He is the son of former ice hockey player Pavel Kumstát and nephew of Petr Kumstát. His mother, Kateřina, was a professional volleyball player.

== ATP Challenger Tour finals ==
=== Singles: 4 (3 titles, 1 runner-up) ===
Legend ATP Challenger (3–1)	Finals by surface Clay (3–0) Hard (0–1)

Result	W–L	Date	Tournament	Tier	Surface	Opponent	Score
Win	1–0	Aug 2026	Svijany Open, Czech Republic	Challenger	Clay	(Peru) Gonzalo Bueno	6–3, 6–1
Win	2–0	Aug 2026	Hamburg Ladies & Gents Cup, Germany	Challenger	Clay	(Germany) Marvin Möller	4–6, 7–6^{(7–5)}, 7–5
Win	3–0	Aug 2026	Prague Open, Czech Republic	Challenger	Clay	(Chinese Taipei) Tseng Chun-hsin	5–7, 6–3, 6–0
Loss	3–1	Nov 2026	Santaizi Challenger, Taiwan	Challenger	Hard (i)	(Japan) Yosuke Watanuki	6–7^{(2–7)}, 5–7

== ITF World Tennis Tour finals ==
=== Singles: 3 (3 runner-ups) ===
Legend ITF WTT (0–3)	Finals by surface Hard (0–1) Clay (0–2)

Result	W–L	Date	Tournament	Tier	Surface	Opponent	Score
Loss	0–1	Jul 2025	M15 Segrate, Italy	WTT	Clay	(Italy) Alexander Weis	4–6, 7–6^{(8–6)}, 1–6
Loss	0–2	Aug 2025	M15 Slovenska Bistrica, Slovenia	WTT	Clay	(Italy) Juan Cruz Martin Manzano	4–6, 7–6^{(7–3)}, 1–4, ret.
Loss	0–3	Mar 2026	M15 Heraklion, Greece	WTT	Hard	(United Kingdom) Henry Searle	2–6, 2–6

=== Doubles: 4 (2 titles, 2 runner-ups) ===
Legend ITF WTT (2–2)	Finals by surface Hard (2–0) Clay (0–2)

Result	W–L	Date	Tournament	Tier	Surface	Partner	Opponents	Score
Loss	0–1	May 2025	M15 Szentendre, Hungary	WTT	Clay	(Czech Republic) Denis Peták	(Spain) Alberto Barroso Campos (Switzerland) Johan Nikles	6–7^{(6–8)}, 6–7^{(5–7)}
Loss	0–2	Jun 2025	M25 Česká Lípa, Czech Republic	WTT	Clay	(Czech Republic) David Poljak	(Ukraine) Vladyslav Orlov (Italy) Filippo Romano	6–7^{(4–7)}, 1–6
Win	1–2	Sep 2025	M15 Monastir, Tunisia	WTT	Hard	(Poland) Piotr Pawlak	(France) Adan Freire da Silva (France) Yanis Ghazouani Durand	7–5, 6–3
Win	2–2	Jan 2026	M15 Monastir, Tunisia	WTT	Hard	(Czech Republic) Jakub Nicod	(Netherlands) Pieter De Lange (Armenia) Daniil Sarksian	6–3, 6–7^{(5–7)}, [11–9]

== Junior Grand Slam finals ==
=== Singles: 1 (runner-up) ===
Result	Year	Tournament	Surface	Opponent	Score
Loss	2024	Australian Open	Hard	(Japan) Rei Sakamoto	6–3, 6–7^{(3–7)}, 5–7

=== Doubles: 2 (1 title, 1 runner-up) ===
Result	Year	Tournament	Surface	Partner	Opponents	Score
Loss	2024	Wimbledon	Grass	(Czech Republic) Jan Klimas	(United States) Alexander Razeghi (Germany) Max Schönhaus	6–7^{(1–7)}, 4–6
Win	2025	Australian Open	Hard	(United States) Maxwell Exsted	(Serbia) Ognjen Milić; Egor Pleshivtsev	7–6^{(8–6)}, 6–3
