= Michael Antonius =

American tennis player (born 2010)

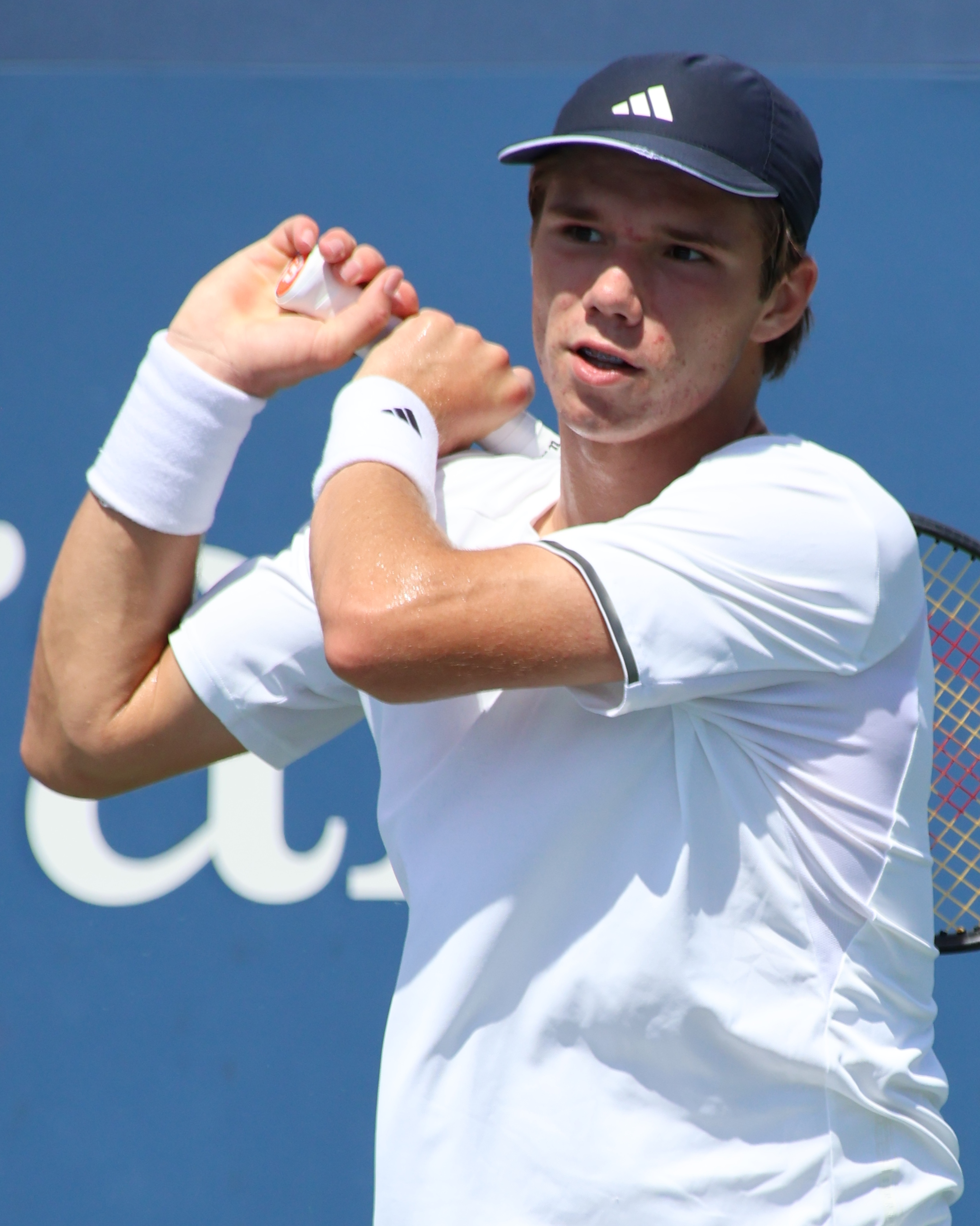
- Antonius at the 2026 US Open
- Country (sports): United States
- Born: January 1, 2010 (age 16) New York City, United States
- Height: 6 ft 3 in (1.91 m)
- Plays: Right-handed (two-handed backhand)
- Prize money: US $62,828

Singles
- Career record: 0–0
- Career titles: 2 ITF
- Highest ranking: No. 580 (November 16, 2026)
- Current ranking: No. 580 (November 16, 2026)

Grand Slam singles results
- US Open: Q2 (2026)
- French Open Junior: F (2026)
- Wimbledon Junior: 1R (2026)
- US Open Junior: 2R (2026)

Doubles
- Career record: 0–0
- Career titles: 1 ITF
- Highest ranking: No. 1,173 (April 13, 2026)
- Current ranking: No. 1,223 (November 16, 2026)

Grand Slam doubles results
- French Open Junior: 1R (2026)
- Wimbledon Junior: F (2026)
- US Open Junior: QF (2025)
- Last updated on: November 16, 2026.

Michael Antonius (born January 1, 2010) is an American tennis player. He has a career high ATP singles ranking of No. 580 achieved on November 16, 2026 and a career high ATP doubles ranking of 1,173 achieved on April 13, 2026.

He also has a career-high ITF junior combined ranking of No. 3 achieved on July 13, 2026.

== Early life ==
Antonius was raised in Buffalo, New York. His father, who is Norwegian, is a psychologist at the University at Buffalo. Antonius trains at the USTA National Campus in Orlando, Florida.

== Career ==
In 2024, Antonius won the boys' singles title at the Petits As in France, becoming the first American to do so since Victor Lilov in 2018.

=== 2026 ===
Antonius won his first ITF singles title at the M25 in Bakersfield, California, becoming the youngest American male to win an ITF title at the age of 16. He reached the 2026 French Open boys' singles final, but lost to Guto Miguel of Brazil.

== Junior Grand Slam finals ==
=== Singles: 1 (1 runner-up) ===
Result	Year	Tournament	Surface	Opponent	Score
Loss	2026	(France) French Open	Clay	(Brazil) Guto Miguel	3–6, 4–6

=== Doubles: 1 (1 runner-up) ===
Result	Year	Tournament	Surface	Partner	Opponent	Score
Loss	2026	Wimbledon	Grass	(United States) Andrew Johnson	(Brazil) Guto Miguel (Slovenia) Žiga Šeško	1–6, 4–6
