= Damme =

Municipality in Flemish Community, Belgium

- City and municipality
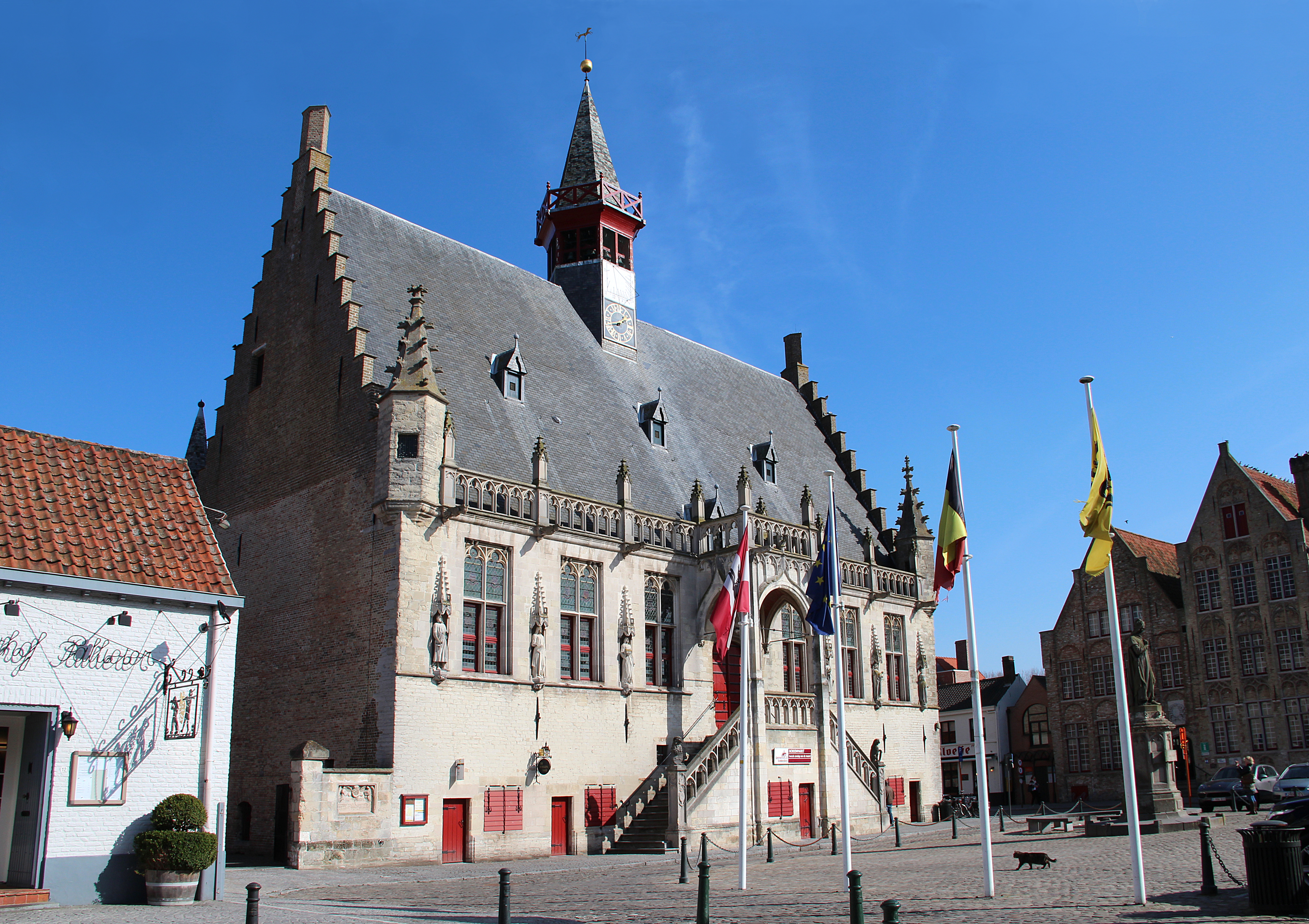
- Damme Town Hall

- Flag Coat of arms

- Location of Damme in West Flanders
- Interactive map of Damme
- Location in Belgium
- Coordinates: 51°15′N 03°16′E
- Country: Belgium
- Community: Flemish Community
- Region: Flemish Region
- Province: West Flanders
- Arrondissement: Bruges

Government
  - Mayor: Joachim Coens (CD&V)
  - Governing party: CD&V

Area
  - Total: 90.36 km^{2} (34.89 sq mi)

Population (2018-01-01)
  - Total: 11,008
  - Density: 121.8/km^{2} (315.5/sq mi)
- Postal codes: 8340
- NIS code: 31006
- Area codes: 050
- Website: www.damme.be

Damme (Dutch pronunciation: [ˈdɑmə]) is a municipality and city located in the Belgian province of West Flanders, six kilometres northeast of Brugge (Bruges). The municipality comprises the city of Damme proper and the villages of Hoeke, Lapscheure, Moerkerke, Oostkerke, Sijsele, Vivenkapelle, and Sint-Rita. On 1 January 2006, the municipality had a population of 10,899. The total area is 89.52 km^{2}, giving a population density of 122 inhabitants per km^{2}.

== History ==
In the 13th century, Damme was one of the major ports of Europe and the outlet to the sea for the major trading city of Bruges, to which it was linked by the river Reie. The river has now been canalised into the long, straight, treelined and picturesque Damse Vaart, which continues across the Dutch border to Sluis. The line of the town's star-shaped fortifications can still be traced by lines of tall poplar trees and in places by a moat. It was the site of the Battle of Damme, fought on 30 and 31 May 1213, when an English fleet under the Earl of Salisbury captured scores of French ships and their cargo of gold, silver, wine, bacon and other victuals.

Well-known Damme inhabitants include Jacob van Maerlant, a medieval poet and the town clerk of Damme until his death in around 1300, and Karel Verleye, co-founder of the Bruges College of Europe, who died in Damme in 2002. According to Charles de Coster (Charles-Theodore-Henri De Coster. La legende et les aventures heroiques, joyeuses et glorieuses d’Ulenspiegel et de Lamme Goedzak au pays de Flandres et ailleurs), Damme is the birthplace of Till Eulenspiegel.

== Tourism ==
Today, Damme is a popular side trip for tourists who are visiting Bruges and is a popular venue for eating out, and a destination for boat trips. Damme has more recently become known as a book town, with numerous bookshops and regular book fairs.

The most popular ways of traveling to Damme are by canal boat that runs during the summer high season or all year round by bus or bicycle. The bicycle route is along the canal path taking the same route that the canal boat takes.

== Maps ==
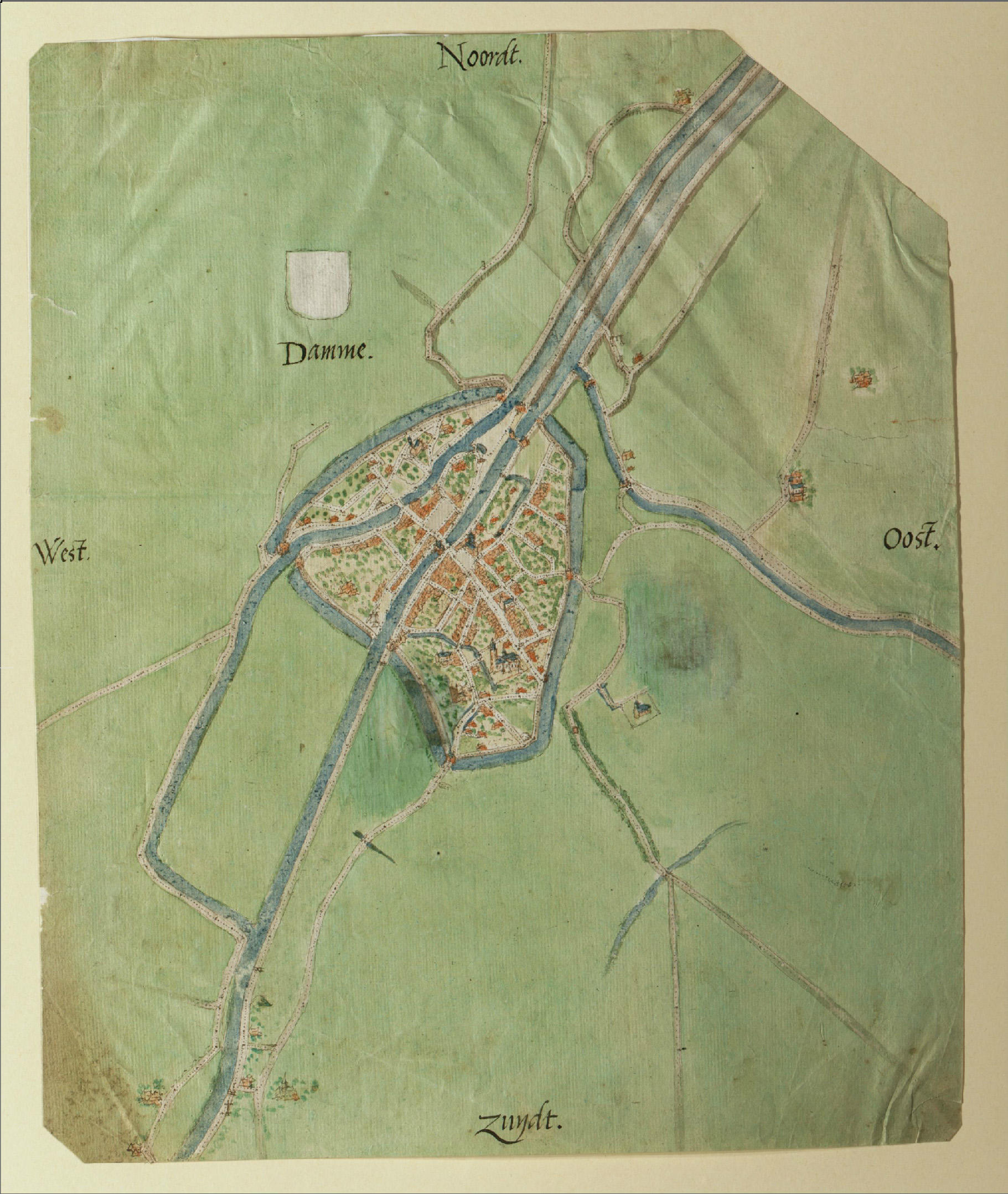
Damme on the Deventer map (around 1558)

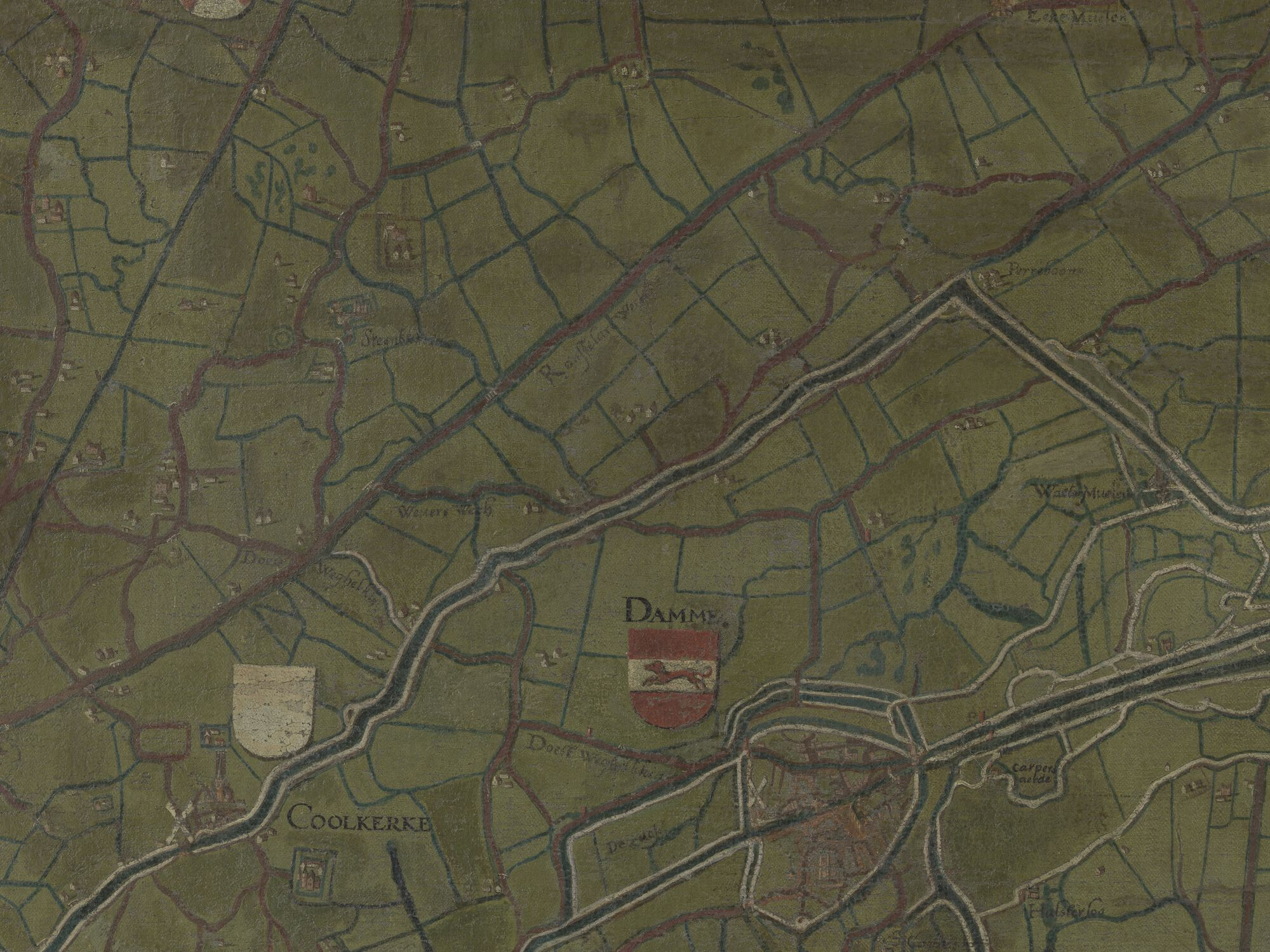
Damme on the map of the Liberty Of Bruges by Pieter Pourbus, 1571

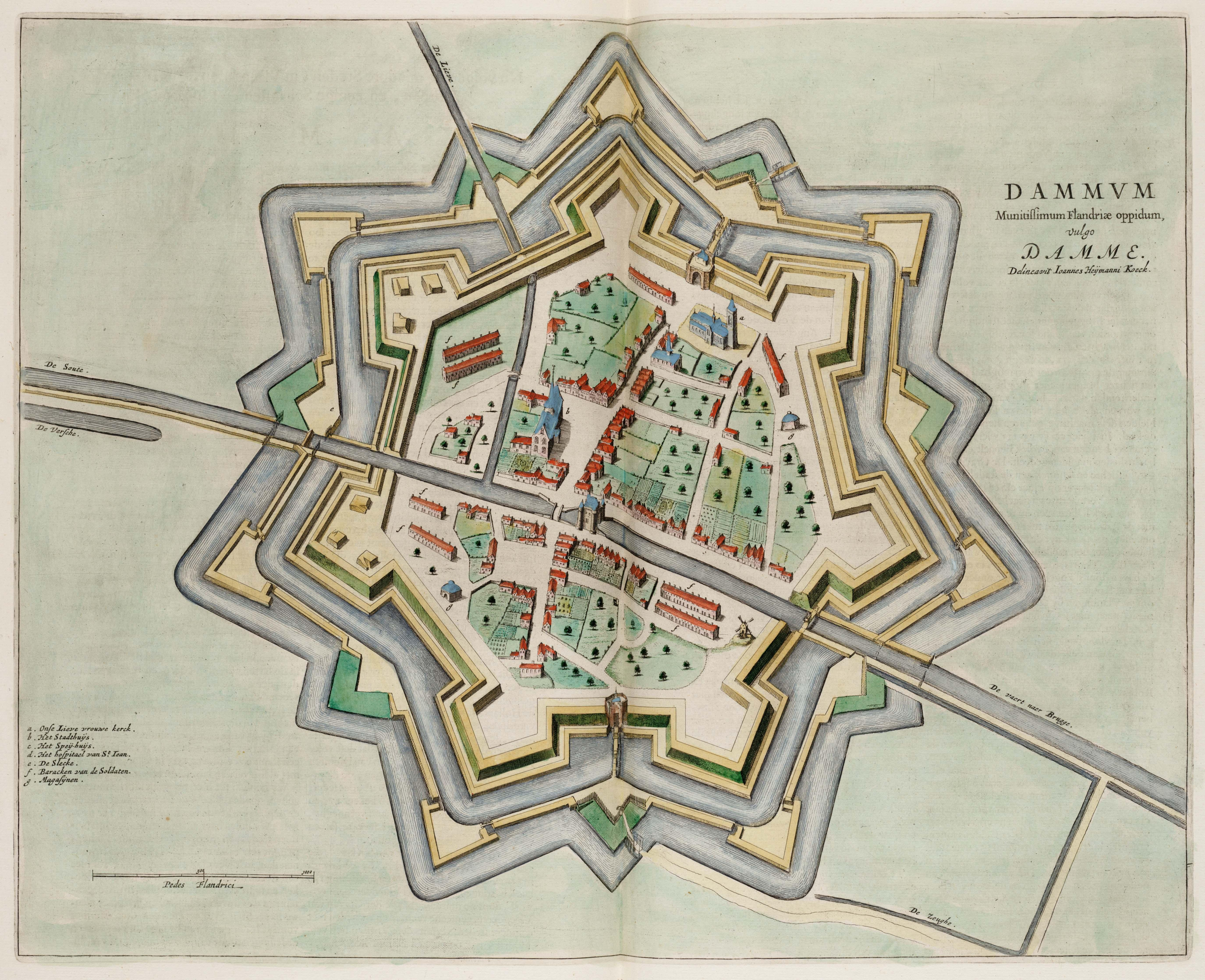
Damme on the Atlas van Loon (around 1649)

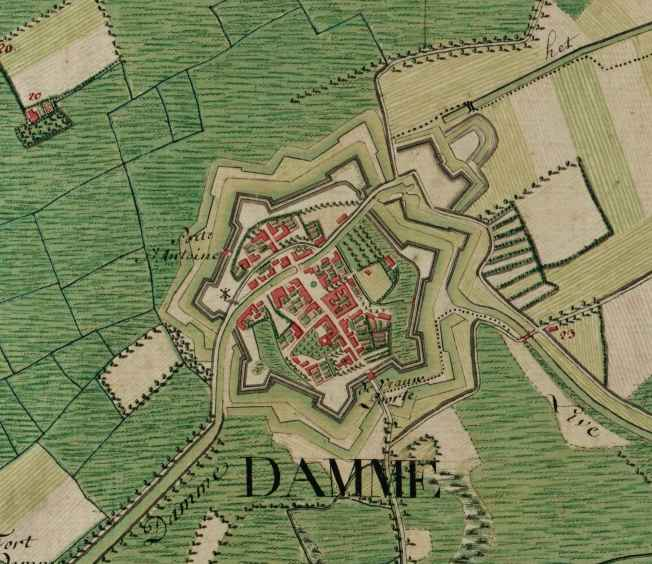
Damme on the Ferraris map (around 1775)

== Sources ==
- Chisholm, Hugh (1911b). "Damme" . In Chisholm, Hugh (ed.). Encyclopædia Britannica. Vol. 7 (11th ed.). Cambridge University Press. p. 789. OCLC 221022251
