= 2024 Wimbledon Championships – Men's singles qualifying =

Men's singles qualifying
- 2024 Wimbledon Championships

Events
Singles	men	women		boys	girls
Doubles	men	women	mixed	boys	girls
WC Singles	men	women	quad
WC Doubles	men	women	quad
Legends	men	women	mixed
14&U Singles	boys	girls

Qualification
Singles	men	women
← 2023 ·	Wimbledon Championships	· 2025 →

The 2024 Wimbledon Championships – Men's singles qualifying was a series of tennis matches that took place from 24 to 27 June 2024 to determine the qualifiers for the 2024 Wimbledon Championships – Men's singles event, and, if necessary, the lucky losers.

Of the 128 players who competed in this knockout tournament, 16 secured a main draw place through winning a qualifying competition, and an additional five earned slots as lucky losers.

This was the first time Richard Gasquet contested a major qualifying competition since the 2004 US Open.

== Seeds ==
The qualifying entry list was released based on the ATP rankings for the week of 27 May 2024. Seedings are based on ATP rankings as of 17 June 2024.

1. (France) Giovanni Mpetshi Perricard (qualifying competition, lucky loser)
2. (France) Hugo Gaston (qualified)
3. (Belgium) Zizou Bergs (qualified)
4. (Australia) James Duckworth (qualifying competition, lucky loser)
5. (South Africa) Lloyd Harris (qualified)
6. (France) Luca Van Assche (qualifying competition, lucky loser)
7. (France) Grégoire Barrère (first round)
8. (Colombia) Daniel Elahi Galán (qualifying competition, lucky loser)
9. (Belgium) David Goffin (qualifying competition, lucky loser)
10. (Bosnia and Herzegovina) Damir Džumhur (qualifying competition, retired)
11. (Monaco) Valentin Vacherot (withdrew)
12. (Chile) Cristian Garín (qualified)
13. (Argentina) Camilo Ugo Carabelli (first round)
14. (Slovakia) Jozef Kovalík (first round)
15. (Argentina) Pedro Cachín (first round)
16. (Czech Republic) Vít Kopřiva (qualified)
17. (Serbia) Hamad Medjedovic (second round)
18. (Italy) Stefano Napolitano (second round)
19. (Argentina) Facundo Bagnis (first round, retired)
20. (France) Richard Gasquet (qualifying competition)
21. (Argentina) Thiago Agustín Tirante (second round)
22. (France) Harold Mayot (first round)
23. (France) Térence Atmane (first round)
24. (United States) Zachary Svajda (second round)
25. (Italy) Francesco Passaro (first round)
26. (Slovakia) Lukáš Klein (second round)
27. (Kazakhstan) Mikhail Kukushkin (qualifying competition)
28. (France) Titouan Droguet (second round)
29. (Italy) Matteo Gigante (second round)
30. (United States) Emilio Nava (second round)
31. (Croatia) Duje Ajduković (first round)
32. (Switzerland) Leandro Riedi (qualifying competition)

== Qualifiers ==
1. (France) Maxime Janvier
2. (France) Hugo Gaston
3. (Belgium) Zizou Bergs
4. (Estonia) Mark Lajal
5. (South Africa) Lloyd Harris
6. (France) Lucas Pouille
7. (France) Quentin Halys
8. (Moldova) Radu Albot
9. (Italy) Mattia Bellucci
10. (Spain) Alejandro Moro Cañas
11. (Australia) Alex Bolt
12. (Chile) Cristian Garín
13. (Brazil) Felipe Meligeni Alves
14. (Sweden) Elias Ymer
15. (Finland) Otto Virtanen
16. (Czech Republic) Vít Kopřiva

== Lucky losers ==
1. (Australia) James Duckworth
2. (France) Luca Van Assche
3. (France) Giovanni Mpetshi Perricard
4. (Colombia) Daniel Elahi Galán
5. (Belgium) David Goffin

== Draw ==
=== Key ===
- Q = Qualifier
- WC = Wild card
- LL = Lucky loser
- Alt = Alternate
- ITF = ITF entry
- PR = Protected ranking
- SR = Special ranking
- SE = Special exempt
- JE = Junior exempt
- JR = Junior Accelerator Programme entrant
- CO = College Accelerator Programme entrant
- NG = Next Gen Accelerator Program entrant
- w/o = Walkover
- r = Retired
- d = Defaulted

=== First qualifier ===
First round
1	(France) Giovanni Mpetshi Perricard	6	7
(France) Ugo Blanchet	2	5
(France) Antoine Escoffier	6	6
(Argentina) Genaro Alberto Olivieri	2	4
(France) Maxime Janvier	7	6
(Chinese Taipei) Hsu Yu-hsiou	5	3
WC	(United Kingdom) Felix Gill	4	1
30	(United States) Emilio Nava	6	6

Second round
1	(France) Giovanni Mpetshi Perricard	7^{7}	6
(France) Antoine Escoffier	6^{5}	2
(France) Maxime Janvier	7^{7}	6
30	(United States) Emilio Nava	6^{1}	3

Qualifying competition
1	(France) Giovanni Mpetshi Perricard	7^{12}	5	6^{4}	6^{5}
(France) Maxime Janvier	6^{10}	7	7^{7}	7^{7}

=== Second qualifier ===
First round
2	(France) Hugo Gaston	7^{7}	6
(Japan) Shintaro Mochizuki	6^{5}	4
(Croatia) Dino Prižmić	6	6
(France) Clément Tabur	3	4
(United Kingdom) Ryan Peniston	6^{10}	2
(France) Benjamin Bonzi	7^{12}	6
(Ukraine) Vitaliy Sachko	3	3
27	(Kazakhstan) Mikhail Kukushkin	6	6

Second round
2	(France) Hugo Gaston	4	7	6
(Croatia) Dino Prižmić	6	5	2
(France) Benjamin Bonzi	4	5
27	(Kazakhstan) Mikhail Kukushkin	6	7

Qualifying competition
2	(France) Hugo Gaston	6	1	7	6
27	(Kazakhstan) Mikhail Kukushkin	2	6	5	1

=== Third qualifier ===
First round
3	(Belgium) Zizou Bergs	6	7
(Australia) Omar Jasika	2	5
(South Korea) Hong Seong-chan	3	2
(France) Pierre-Hugues Herbert	6	6
(France) Matteo Martineau	7^{7}	2	6^{7}
(Kazakhstan) Denis Yevseyev	6^{4}	6	7^{10}
(Bosnia and Herzegovina) Nerman Fatić	3	7^{7}	3
28	(France) Titouan Droguet	6	6^{5}	6

Second round
3	(Belgium) Zizou Bergs	6	6^{4}	6
(France) Pierre-Hugues Herbert	3	7^{7}	4
(Kazakhstan) Denis Yevseyev	6	7^{7}
28	(France) Titouan Droguet	4	6^{3}

Qualifying competition
3	(Belgium) Zizou Bergs	6	6	6
(Kazakhstan) Denis Yevseyev	1	2	2

=== Fourth qualifier ===
First round
4	(Australia) James Duckworth	6^{8}	6	6
(Germany) Benjamin Hassan	7^{10}	2	4
(United States) Nicolas Moreno de Alboran	6	6
(France) Benoît Paire	4	1
(Portugal) Jaime Faria	6^{5}	6^{5}
(Portugal) Henrique Rocha	7^{7}	7^{7}
(Estonia) Mark Lajal	5	6	6
25	(Italy) Francesco Passaro	7	3	3

Second round
4	(Australia) James Duckworth	7^{8}	6
(United States) Nicolas Moreno de Alboran	6^{6}	4
(Portugal) Henrique Rocha	6^{3}	3
(Estonia) Mark Lajal	7^{7}	6

Qualifying competition
4	(Australia) James Duckworth	4	4	4
(Estonia) Mark Lajal	6	6	6

=== Fifth qualifier ===
First round
5	(South Africa) Lloyd Harris	6	6
(Italy) Andrea Vavassori	2	2
(Italy) Stefano Travaglia	4	6	5
WC	(United Kingdom) George Loffhagen	6	4	7
(France) Hugo Grenier	6	6
(Bolivia) Murkel Dellien	4	4
(Hong Kong) Coleman Wong	4	4
24	(United States) Zachary Svajda	6	6

Second round
5	(South Africa) Lloyd Harris	7^{8}	7^{7}
WC	(United Kingdom) George Loffhagen	6^{6}	6^{5}
(France) Hugo Grenier	5	7^{7}	7
24	(United States) Zachary Svajda	7	6^{4}	5

Qualifying competition
5	(South Africa) Lloyd Harris	6	6	3	7^{7}
(France) Hugo Grenier	4	2	6	6^{5}

=== Sixth qualifier ===
First round
6	(France) Luca Van Assche	6	3	7^{10}
Alt	(France) Jules Marie	1	6	6^{8}
(France) Valentin Royer	3	6^{5}
(Australia) Li Tu	6	7^{7}
WC	(United Kingdom) Jack Pinnington Jones	0	3
(France) Lucas Pouille	6	6
(Czech Republic) Jiří Veselý	6	2	6
22	(France) Harold Mayot	2	6	4

Second round
6	(France) Luca Van Assche	7	3	7^{10}
(Australia) Li Tu	5	6	6^{7}
(France) Lucas Pouille	7^{8}	6
(Czech Republic) Jiří Veselý	6^{6}	2

Qualifying competition
6	(France) Luca Van Assche	6^{4}	5	2
(France) Lucas Pouille	7^{7}	7	6

=== Seventh qualifier ===
First round
7	(France) Grégoire Barrère	3	4
(France) Quentin Halys	6	6
WC	(United Kingdom) Jay Clarke	6	6
(Argentina) Diego Schwartzman	4	3
(Austria) Jurij Rodionov	6^{5}	6^{7}
(Kazakhstan) Beibit Zhukayev	7^{7}	7^{9}
(Spain) Daniel Rincón	5	3
17	(Serbia) Hamad Medjedovic	7	6

Second round
(France) Quentin Halys	6	3	6
WC	(United Kingdom) Jay Clarke	3	6	3
(Kazakhstan) Beibit Zhukayev	6^{3}	7	6
17	(Serbia) Hamad Medjedovic	7^{7}	5	4

Qualifying competition
(France) Quentin Halys	6	6	6
(Kazakhstan) Beibit Zhukayev	3	4	4

=== Eighth qualifier ===
First round
8	(Colombia) Daniel Elahi Galán	6	6
(Spain) Oriol Roca Batalla	3	4
(Tunisia) Aziz Dougaz	7^{10}	1	6^{6}
(Canada) Gabriel Diallo	6^{8}	6	7^{10}
(Italy) Francesco Maestrelli	2	7^{7}	2
(Moldova) Radu Albot	6	6^{5}	6
(China) Bu Yunchaokete	6^{5}	7^{7}	6
23	(France) Térence Atmane	7^{7}	6^{5}	2

Second round
8	(Colombia) Daniel Elahi Galán	6	7^{7}
(Canada) Gabriel Diallo	4	6^{5}
(Moldova) Radu Albot	7	6^{10}	6
(China) Bu Yunchaokete	5	7^{12}	4

Qualifying competition
8	(Colombia) Daniel Elahi Galán	4	2	7^{8}	3
(Moldova) Radu Albot	6	6	6^{6}	6

=== Ninth qualifier ===
First round
9	(Belgium) David Goffin	6	6
(Australia) Marc Polmans	3	1
(Japan) Yasutaka Uchiyama	6^{6}	7^{7}	6
PR	(Netherlands) Tim van Rijthoven	7^{8}	6^{3}	1
(Australia) Dane Sweeny	5	1
(Spain) Bernabé Zapata Miralles	7	6
(Italy) Mattia Bellucci	5	7	7^{14}
31	(Croatia) Duje Ajduković	7	5	6^{12}

Second round
9	(Belgium) David Goffin	7^{7}	6
(Japan) Yasutaka Uchiyama	6^{4}	4
(Spain) Bernabé Zapata Miralles	6^{3}	3
(Italy) Mattia Bellucci	7^{7}	6

Qualifying competition
9	(Belgium) David Goffin	3	6	6^{4}	4
(Italy) Mattia Bellucci	6	2	7^{7}	6

=== Tenth qualifier ===
First round
10	(Bosnia and Herzegovina) Damir Džumhur	6	7^{7}
(Australia) Tristan Schoolkate	4	6^{3}
(Dominican Republic) Nick Hardt	6	6
(Austria) Dennis Novak	4	2
(Brazil) João Fonseca	6	3	6^{10}
(Spain) Alejandro Moro Cañas	4	6	7^{12}
(France) Kyrian Jacquet	4	6^{6}
29	(Italy) Matteo Gigante	6	7^{8}

Second round
10	(Bosnia and Herzegovina) Damir Džumhur	6	3	6
(Dominican Republic) Nick Hardt	4	6	1
(Spain) Alejandro Moro Cañas	7	6
29	(Italy) Matteo Gigante	5	2

Qualifying competition
10	(Bosnia and Herzegovina) Damir Džumhur	6^{6}	4	1^{r}
(Spain) Alejandro Moro Cañas	7^{8}	6	0

=== Eleventh qualifier ===
First round
Alt	(Australia) Alex Bolt	6	6
PR	(Argentina) Nicolás Kicker	1	4
(Germany) Rudolf Molleker	6	6
(Bulgaria) Adrian Andreev	3	4
(United States) Patrick Kypson	6	7^{7}
WC	(United Kingdom) Stuart Parker	3	6^{3}
(Argentina) Juan Pablo Ficovich	0	6^{1}
32	(Switzerland) Leandro Riedi	6	7^{7}

Second round
Alt	(Australia) Alex Bolt	6	6
(Germany) Rudolf Molleker	1	4
(United States) Patrick Kypson	2	6	5
32	(Switzerland) Leandro Riedi	6	3	7

Qualifying competition
Alt	(Australia) Alex Bolt	6^{2}	2	7^{9}	7	6
32	(Switzerland) Leandro Riedi	7^{7}	6	6^{7}	5	4

=== Twelfth qualifier ===
First round
12	(Chile) Cristian Garín	7^{7}	7
(France) Enzo Couacaud	6^{5}	5
(Chile) Tomás Barrios Vera	3	6	6
WC	(United Kingdom) Anton Matusevich	6	4	3
(Italy) Andrea Pellegrino	3	3
(Kazakhstan) Timofey Skatov	6	6
(United States) Tristan Boyer	4	6^{5}
26	(Slovakia) Lukáš Klein	6	7^{7}

Second round
12	(Chile) Cristian Garín	2	6	6
(Chile) Tomás Barrios Vera	6	2	0
(Kazakhstan) Timofey Skatov	7^{10}	7^{7}
26	(Slovakia) Lukáš Klein	6^{8}	6^{5}

Qualifying competition
12	(Chile) Cristian Garín	6	7	6
(Kazakhstan) Timofey Skatov	2	5	3

=== Thirteenth qualifier ===
First round
13	(Argentina) Camilo Ugo Carabelli	2	4
(Belgium) Joris De Loore	6	6
(Brazil) Felipe Meligeni Alves	6	6
(Ukraine) Illya Marchenko	2	4
(Switzerland) Marc-Andrea Hüsler	7^{7}	3	5
(United States) Maxime Cressy	6^{3}	6	7
(Czech Republic) Dalibor Svrčina	3	7^{8}	3
21	(Argentina) Thiago Agustín Tirante	6	6^{6}	6

Second round
(Belgium) Joris De Loore	6^{3}	4
(Brazil) Felipe Meligeni Alves	7^{7}	6
(United States) Maxime Cressy	7^{11}	6
21	(Argentina) Thiago Agustín Tirante	6^{9}	3

Qualifying competition
(Brazil) Felipe Meligeni Alves	6	1	7^{7}	4	6
(United States) Maxime Cressy	4	6	6^{5}	6	4

=== Fourteenth qualifier ===
First round
14	(Slovakia) Jozef Kovalík	5	3
(Japan) Sho Shimabukuro	7	6
(United States) Denis Kudla	6^{3}	2
(Netherlands) Jesper de Jong	7^{7}	6
(Sweden) Elias Ymer	6	6
(Austria) Lukas Neumayer	3	3
(Argentina) Marco Trungelliti	6	1
19	(Argentina) Facundo Bagnis	3	1^{r}

Second round
(Japan) Sho Shimabukuro	7^{7}	4	7^{10}
(Netherlands) Jesper de Jong	6^{3}	6	6^{8}
(Sweden) Elias Ymer	6^{4}	6	6
(Argentina) Marco Trungelliti	7^{7}	4	2

Qualifying competition
(Japan) Sho Shimabukuro	6^{3}	3	1
(Sweden) Elias Ymer	7^{7}	6	6

=== Fifteenth qualifier ===
First round
15	(Argentina) Pedro Cachín	6^{5}	3
(Switzerland) Alexander Ritschard	7^{7}	6
(Finland) Otto Virtanen	6^{6}	6	7^{10}
(Italy) Franco Agamenone	7^{8}	2	6^{6}
(Brazil) Gustavo Heide	7	6^{4}	1
(Argentina) Román Andrés Burruchaga	5	7^{7}	6
(Hungary) Zsombor Piros	6	2	6^{8}
18	(Italy) Stefano Napolitano	1	6	7^{10}

Second round
(Switzerland) Alexander Ritschard	7^{7}	5	4
(Finland) Otto Virtanen	6^{1}	7	6
(Argentina) Román Andrés Burruchaga	6	6
18	(Italy) Stefano Napolitano	4	4

Qualifying competition
(Finland) Otto Virtanen	6	6	5	7^{7}
(Argentina) Román Andrés Burruchaga	1	2	7	6^{4}

=== Sixteenth qualifier ===
First round
16	(Czech Republic) Vít Kopřiva	4	7^{7}	6
(Germany) Henri Squire	6	6^{1}	4
(Bolivia) Hugo Dellien	6	6^{5}	6
(Australia) Philip Sekulic	3	7^{7}	3
(France) Manuel Guinard	6	3	2
(Canada) Alexis Galarneau	4	6	6
(United Kingdom) Oliver Crawford	2	6^{8}
20	(France) Richard Gasquet	6	7^{10}

Second round
16	(Czech Republic) Vít Kopřiva	6	3	6
(Bolivia) Hugo Dellien	4	6	1
(Canada) Alexis Galarneau	1	0
20	(France) Richard Gasquet	6	6

Qualifying competition
16	(Czech Republic) Vít Kopřiva	3	6	6	6
20	(France) Richard Gasquet	6	3	2	4
