= 2024 Wimbledon Championships – Day-by-day summaries =

The 2024 Wimbledon Championships's order of play for main draw matches on the center court and outside courts, starting from 1 July until 14 July.

All dates are BST (UTC+1).

== Day 1 (1 July) ==
- Seeds out:
  - Gentlemen's Singles: (Argentina) Sebastián Báez [18], (Chile) Nicolás Jarry [19], (France) Adrian Mannarino [22], (Argentina) Mariano Navone [31]
  - Ladies' Singles: (China) Zheng Qinwen [8], Mirra Andreeva [24], (Romania) Sorana Cîrstea [29]
- Schedule of play

Matches on main courts
Matches on Centre Court
Event	Winner	Loser	Score
Gentlemen's Singles 1st Round	(Spain) Carlos Alcaraz [3]	(Estonia) Mark Lajal [Q]	7–6^{(7–3)}, 7–5, 6–2
Ladies' Singles 1st Round	(United Kingdom) Emma Raducanu [WC]	(Mexico) Renata Zarazúa [LL]	7–6^{(7–0)}, 6–3
Ladies' Singles 1st Round	(United States) Coco Gauff [2]	(United States) Caroline Dolehide	6–1, 6–2
Matches on No. 1 Court
Event	Winner	Loser	Score
Gentlemen's Singles 1st Round	Daniil Medvedev [5]	(United States) Aleksandar Kovacevic	6–3, 6–4, 6–2
Ladies' Singles 1st Round (Note: This match was originally scheduled to play on No. 3 Court but was moved to No. 1 Court due to Aryna Sabalenka's withdrawal. The originally scheduled match was moved to Court 18.)	(United States) Madison Keys [12]	(Italy) Martina Trevisan	6–4, 7–6^{(7–4)}
Gentlemen's Singles 1st Round	(Italy) Jannik Sinner [1]	(Germany) Yannick Hanfmann	6–3, 6–4, 3–6, 6–3
Matches on No. 2 Court
Event	Winner	Loser	Score
Gentlemen's Singles 1st Round	(Bulgaria) Grigor Dimitrov [10]	(Serbia) Dušan Lajović	6–3, 6–4, 7–5
Gentlemen's Singles 1st Round	(Switzerland) Stan Wawrinka	(United Kingdom) Charles Broom [WC]	6–3, 7–5, 6–4
Ladies' Singles 1st Round	(Japan) Naomi Osaka [WC]	(France) Diane Parry	6–1, 1–6, 6–4
Ladies' Singles 1st Round	(United States) Sloane Stephens	(France) Elsa Jacquemot [LL]	6–3, 6–3
Ladies' Singles 1st Round (Note: This match was originally scheduled to play on Court 15 but was moved to No. 2 Court following the conclusion of Jacquemot-Stephens match due to match overruns.)	(Canada) Bianca Andreescu [PR]	(Romania) Jaqueline Cristian	6–4, 6–2
Matches on No. 3 Court
Event	Winner	Loser	Score
Gentlemen's Singles 1st Round	(Norway) Casper Ruud [8]	(Australia) Alex Bolt [Q]	7–6^{(7–2)}, 6–4, 6–4
Ladies' Singles 1st Round	(Italy) Jasmine Paolini [7]	(Spain) Sara Sorribes Tormo	7–5, 6–3
Ladies' Singles 1st Round (Note: This match was originally scheduled to play on Court 18 but was moved to No. 3 Court due to Aryna Sabalenka's withdrawal.)	(New Zealand) Lulu Sun [Q]	(China) Zheng Qinwen [8]	4–6, 6–2, 6–4
Gentlemen's Singles 1st Round	(United States) Tommy Paul [12]	(Spain) Pedro Martínez	6–1, 6–2, 4–6, 6–3
Matches began at 11 am (1:30 pm on Centre Court and 1:00 pm on No. 1 Court) BST

== Day 2 (2 July) ==
- Seeds out:
  - Gentlemen's Singles: Andrey Rublev [6], (United States) Sebastian Korda [20]
  - Ladies' Singles: (Czech Republic) Markéta Vondroušová [6]
- Schedule of play

Matches on main courts
Matches on Centre Court
Event	Winner	Loser	Score
Ladies' Singles 1st Round	(Spain) Jéssica Bouzas Maneiro	(Czech Republic) Markéta Vondroušová [6]	6–4, 6–2
Gentlemen's Singles 1st Round	(Serbia) Novak Djokovic [2]	(Czech Republic) Vít Kopřiva [Q]	6–1, 6–2, 6–2
Gentlemen's Singles 1st Round (Note: This match was originally scheduled to play on No. 2 Court but was moved to Centre Court due to Andy Murray's withdrawal. The originally scheduled match was moved to Court 8.)	(United Kingdom) Jack Draper [28]	(Sweden) Elias Ymer [Q]	3–6, 6–3, 6–3, 4–6, 6–3
Matches on No. 1 Court
Event	Winner	Loser	Score
Ladies' Singles 1st Round	(Kazakhstan) Elena Rybakina [4]	(Romania) Elena-Gabriela Ruse [Q]	6–3, 6–1
Gentlemen's Singles 1st Round	(Germany) Alexander Zverev [4]	(Spain) Roberto Carballés Baena	6–2, 6–4, 6–2
Ladies' Singles 1st Round	(Poland) Iga Świątek [1]	(United States) Sofia Kenin	6–3, 6–4
Matches on No. 2 Court
Event	Winner	Loser	Score
Ladies' Singles 1st Round	(United States) Jessica Pegula [5]	(United States) Ashlyn Krueger	6–2, 6–0
Gentlemen's Singles 1st Round	(Argentina) Francisco Comesaña	Andrey Rublev [6]	6–4, 5–7, 6–2, 7–6^{(7–5)}
Gentlemen's Singles 1st Round (Note: This match was originally scheduled to play on Court 17 but was moved to No. 2 Court due to Andy Murray's withdrawal.)	(Canada) Félix Auger-Aliassime [17] vs (Australia) Thanasi Kokkinakis		6–4, 7–5, 6–7^{(9–11)}, 1–1, suspended
Matches on No. 3 Court
Event	Winner	Loser	Score
Gentlemen's Singles 1st Round	(Poland) Hubert Hurkacz [7]	(Moldova) Radu Albot [Q]	5–7, 6–4, 6–3, 6–4
Ladies' Singles 1st Round	(United Kingdom) Katie Boulter [32]	(Germany) Tatjana Maria	7–6^{(8–6)}, 7–5
Gentlemen's Singles 1st Round	(United Kingdom) Cameron Norrie	(Argentina) Facundo Díaz Acosta	7–5, 7–5, 6–3
Matches began at 11 am (1:30 pm on Centre Court and 1:00 pm on No. 1 Court) BST

== Day 3 (3 July) ==
- Seeds out:
  - Gentlemen's Singles: (Norway) Casper Ruud [8], (Canada) Félix Auger-Aliassime [17], (Argentina) Francisco Cerúndolo [26], (Netherlands) Tallon Griekspoor [27], (China) Zhang Zhizhen [32]
  - Ladies' Singles: Anastasia Pavlyuchenkova [25], (Czech Republic) Linda Nosková [26]
  - Gentlemen's Doubles: (Italy) Simone Bolelli / (Italy) Andrea Vavassori [5], (Croatia) Ivan Dodig / (United States) Austin Krajicek [10]
- Schedule of play

Matches on main courts
Matches on Centre Court
Event	Winner	Loser	Score
Gentlemen's Singles 2nd Round	Daniil Medvedev [5]	(France) Alexandre Müller	6–7^{(3–7)}, 7–6^{(7–4)}, 6–4, 7–5
Ladies' Singles 2nd Round	(United States) Emma Navarro [19]	(Japan) Naomi Osaka [WC]	6–4, 6–1
Gentlemen's Singles 2nd Round	(Italy) Jannik Sinner [1]	(Italy) Matteo Berrettini	7–6^{(7–3)}, 7–6^{(7–4)}, 2–6, 7–6^{(7–4)}
Matches on No. 1 Court
Event	Winner	Loser	Score
Ladies' Singles 2nd Round	(United States) Coco Gauff [2]	(Romania) Anca Todoni [Q]	6–2, 6–1
Gentlemen's Singles 2nd Round	(Spain) Carlos Alcaraz [3]	(Australia) Aleksandar Vukic	7–6^{(7–5)}, 6–2, 6–2
Ladies' Singles 2nd Round	(United Kingdom) Emma Raducanu [WC]	(Belgium) Elise Mertens	6–1, 6–2
Ladies' Singles 2nd Round (Note: This match was originally scheduled to play on No. 2 Court but was moved to No. 1 Court following the conclusion of Mertens-Raducanu match due to match overruns.)	(Italy) Jasmine Paolini [7]	(Belgium) Greet Minnen	7–6^{(7–5)}, 6–2
Matches on No. 2 Court
Event	Winner	Loser	Score
Gentlemen's Singles 2nd Round	(Italy) Fabio Fognini	(Norway) Casper Ruud [8]	6–4, 7–5, 6–7^{(1–7)}, 6–3
Gentlemen's Singles 1st Round	(Australia) Thanasi Kokkinakis	(Canada) Félix Auger-Aliassime [17]	4–6, 5–7, 7–6^{(11–9)}, 6–4, 6–4
Gentlemen's Singles 2nd Round	(Switzerland) Stan Wawrinka vs (France) Gaël Monfils		6–7^{(5–7)}, 4–6, 5–5, suspended
Ladies' Singles 2nd Round	(China) Wang Yafan vs (United States) Madison Keys [12]		Postponed
Matches on No. 3 Court
Event	Winner	Loser	Score
Ladies' Singles 2nd Round	(United Kingdom) Sonay Kartal [Q]	(France) Clara Burel	6–3, 5–7, 6–3
Gentlemen's Singles 2nd Round	(United States) Tommy Paul [12]	(Finland) Otto Virtanen [Q]	4–6, 6–3, 5–7, 7–5, 6–4
Gentlemen's Singles 2nd Round	(Bulgaria) Grigor Dimitrov [10] vs (China) Shang Juncheng		Postponed
Ladies' Singles 2nd Round	Daria Kasatkina [14] vs (United Kingdom) Lily Miyazaki [WC]		Postponed
Matches began at 11 am (1:30 pm on Centre Court and 1:00 pm on No. 1 Court) BST

== Day 4 (4 July) ==
- Seeds out:
  - Gentlemen's Singles: (Poland) Hubert Hurkacz [7], (Greece) Stefanos Tsitsipas [11], Karen Khachanov [22], (United Kingdom) Jack Draper [28], (Argentina) Tomás Martín Etcheverry [30]
  - Ladies' Singles: (United States) Jessica Pegula [5], (France) Caroline Garcia [23], (Czech Republic) Kateřina Siniaková [27], (Canada) Leylah Fernandez [30], (United Kingdom) Katie Boulter [32]
  - Ladies' Doubles: (Netherlands) Demi Schuurs / (Brazil) Luisa Stefani [6], (Mexico) Giuliana Olmos / Alexandra Panova [13]
- Schedule of play

Matches on main courts
Matches on Centre Court
Event	Winner	Loser	Score
Gentlemen's Singles 2nd Round	(Serbia) Novak Djokovic [2]	(United Kingdom) Jacob Fearnley [WC]	6–3, 6–4, 5–7, 7–5
Ladies' Singles 2nd Round	(Poland) Iga Świątek [1]	(Croatia) Petra Martić	6–4, 6–3
Gentlemen's Doubles 1st Round	(Australia) Rinky Hijikata (Australia) John Peers	(United Kingdom) Andy Murray [WC] (United Kingdom) Jamie Murray [WC]	7–6^{(8–6)}, 6–4
Matches on No. 1 Court
Event	Winner	Loser	Score
Ladies' Singles 2nd Round	(United Kingdom) Harriet Dart	(United Kingdom) Katie Boulter [32]	4–6, 6–1, 7–6^{(10–8)}
Gentlemen's Singles 2nd Round	(United Kingdom) Cameron Norrie	(United Kingdom) Jack Draper [28]	7–6^{(7–3)}, 6–4, 7–6^{(8–6)}
Gentlemen's Singles 2nd Round	(Germany) Alexander Zverev [4]	(United States) Marcos Giron	6–2, 6–1, 6–4
Ladies' Singles 2nd Round (Note: This match was originally played on Court 12, and was suspended at 3–3 in the final set due to darkness. It was completed on No. 1 Court following the conclusion of Giron-Zverev match.)	(Denmark) Caroline Wozniacki [WC]	(Canada) Leylah Fernandez [30]	6–3, 2–6, 7–5
Matches on No. 2 Court
Event	Winner	Loser	Score
Gentlemen's Singles 2nd Round	(France) Arthur Fils	(Poland) Hubert Hurkacz [7]	7–6^{(7–4)}, 6–4, 2–6, 6–6^{(9–8)}, retired
Gentlemen's Singles 2nd Round	(France) Gael Monfils	(Switzerland) Stan Wawrinka	7–6^{(7–5)}, 6–4, 7–6^{(7–3)}
Ladies' Singles 2nd Round	(Tunisia) Ons Jabeur [10]	(United States) Robin Montgomery [Q]	6–1, 7–5
Ladies' Singles 2nd Round	(Kazakhstan) Elena Rybakina [4]	(Germany) Laura Siegemund	6–3, 3–6, 6–3
Matches on No. 3 Court
Event	Winner	Loser	Score
Gentlemen's Singles 2nd Round	(Australia) Alex de Minaur [9]	(Spain) Jaume Munar	6–2, 6–2, 7–5
Ladies' Singles 2nd Round	(China) Wang Xinyu	(United States) Jessica Pegula [5]	6–4, 6–7^{(7–9)}, 6–1
Ladies' Singles 2nd Round	(United States) Danielle Collins [11]	(Hungary) Dalma Gálfi [Q]	6–3, 6–4
Gentlemen's Singles 2nd Round	(Finland) Emil Ruusuvuori	(Greece) Stefanos Tsitsipas [11]	7–6^{(8–6)}, 7–6^{(12–10)}, 3–6, 6–3
Matches began at 11 am (1:30 pm on Centre Court and 1:00 pm on No. 1 Court) BST

== Day 5 (5 July) ==
- Seeds out:
  - Gentlemen's Singles: (Kazakhstan) Alexander Bublik [23], (United States) Frances Tiafoe [29]
  - Ladies' Singles: (Greece) Maria Sakkari [9], Daria Kasatkina [14], (Ukraine) Marta Kostyuk [18], (Ukraine) Dayana Yastremska [28]
  - Gentlemen's Doubles: (Monaco) Hugo Nys / (Poland) Jan Zieliński [13]
  - Ladies' Doubles: (Czech Republic) Marie Bouzková / (Spain) Sara Sorribes Tormo [10]
- Schedule of play

Matches on main courts
Matches on Centre Court
Event	Winner	Loser	Score
Gentlemen's Singles 3rd Round	(Spain) Carlos Alcaraz [3]	(United States) Frances Tiafoe [29]	5–7, 6–2, 4–6, 7–6^{(7–2)}, 6–2
Ladies' Singles 3rd Round	(United Kingdom) Emma Raducanu [WC]	(Greece) Maria Sakkari [9]	6–2, 6–3
Gentlemen's Singles 3rd Round	(Italy) Jannik Sinner [1]	(Serbia) Miomir Kecmanović	6–1, 6–4, 6–2
Matches on No. 1 Court
Event	Winner	Loser	Score
Ladies' Singles 3rd Round	(Italy) Jasmine Paolini [7]	(Canada) Bianca Andreescu [PR]	7–6^{(7–4)}, 6–1
Gentlemen's Singles 3rd Round	(Bulgaria) Grigor Dimitrov [10]	(France) Gaël Monfils	6–3, 6–4, 6–3
Ladies' Singles 3rd Round	(United States) Coco Gauff [2]	(United Kingdom) Sonay Kartal [Q]	6–4, 6–0
Ladies' Singles 3rd Round (Note: This match was originally played on Court 18, and was suspended at the end of the first set due to rain. It was completed on No. 1 Court following the conclusion of Gauff-Kartal match.)	(Croatia) Donna Vekić	(Ukraine) Dayana Yastremska [28]	7–6^{(7–4)}, 6–7^{(3–7)}, 6–1
Matches on No. 2 Court
Event	Winner	Loser	Score
Gentlemen's Singles 3rd Round	(United States) Tommy Paul [12]	(Kazakhstan) Alexander Bublik [23]	6–3, 6–4, 6–2
Gentlemen's Singles 3rd Round	(Germany) Jan-Lennard Struff vs Daniil Medvedev [5]		1–6, 3–6, 6–4, 1–1, suspended
Gentlemen's Doubles 2nd Round	(United States) Rajeev Ram / (United Kingdom) Joe Salisbury [3] vs (Germany) Andreas Mies / (Australia) John-Patrick Smith		Postponed
Matches on No. 3 Court
Event	Winner	Loser	Score
Ladies' Singles 3rd Round	(Spain) Paula Badosa [PR]	Daria Kasatkina [14]	7–6^{(8–6)}, 4–6, 6–4
Gentlemen's Singles 3rd Round	(Canada) Denis Shapovalov [PR] vs (United States) Ben Shelton [14]		2–3, suspended
Matches began at 11 am (1:30 pm on Centre Court and 1:00 pm on No. 1 Court) BST

== Day 6 (6 July) ==
- Seeds out:
  - Gentlemen's Singles: (Chile) Alejandro Tabilo [24]
  - Ladies' Singles: (Poland) Iga Świątek [1], (Tunisia) Ons Jabeur [10], Liudmila Samsonova [15], (Brazil) Beatriz Haddad Maia [20]
  - Gentlemen's Doubles: (India) Rohan Bopanna / (Australia) Matthew Ebden [2], (Belgium) Sander Gillé / (Belgium) Joran Vliegen [14]
  - Ladies' Doubles: (Norway) Ulrikke Eikeri / (Estonia) Ingrid Neel [16]
- Schedule of play

Matches on main courts
Matches on Centre Court
Event	Winner	Loser	Score
Gentlemen's Singles 3rd Round	(Germany) Alexander Zverev [4]	(United Kingdom) Cameron Norrie	6–4, 6–4, 7–6^{(17–15)}
Ladies' Singles 3rd Round	(Ukraine) Elina Svitolina [21]	(Tunisia) Ons Jabeur [10]	6–1, 7–6^{(7–4)}
Gentlemen's Singles 3rd Round	(Serbia) Novak Djokovic [2]	(Australia) Alexei Popyrin	4–6, 6–3, 6–4, 7–6^{(7–3)}
Matches on No. 1 Court
Event	Winner	Loser	Score
Gentlemen's Singles 3rd Round	(United States) Ben Shelton [14]	(Canada) Denis Shapovalov [PR]	6–7^{(4–7)}, 6–2, 6–4, 4–6, 6–2
Ladies' Singles 3rd Round	(Kazakhstan) Yulia Putintseva	(Poland) Iga Świątek [1]	3–6, 6–1, 6–2
Ladies' Singles 3rd Round	(Kazakhstan) Elena Rybakina [4]	(Denmark) Caroline Wozniacki [WC]	6–0, 6–1
Gentlemen's Singles 3rd Round (Note: This match was originally played on Court 18, and was suspended at 3–2 to Halys in the fourth set due to rain. It was completed on No. 1 Court following the conclusion of Rybakina-Wozniacki match.)	(Denmark) Holger Rune [15]	(France) Quentin Halys [Q]	1–6, 6–7^{(4–7)}, 6–4, 7–6^{(7–4)}, 6–1
Matches on No. 2 Court
Event	Winner	Loser	Score
Ladies' Singles 3rd Round	(China) Wang Xinyu	(United Kingdom) Harriet Dart	2–6, 7–5, 6–3
Gentlemen's Singles 3rd Round	Daniil Medvedev [5]	(Germany) Jan-Lennard Struff	6–1, 6–3, 4–6, 7–6^{(7–3)}
Gentlemen's Singles 3rd Round	(United States) Taylor Fritz [13]	(Chile) Alejandro Tabilo [24]	7–6^{(7–3)}, 6–3, 7–5
Matches on No. 3 Court
Event	Winner	Loser	Score
Gentlemen's Singles 3rd Round	(Australia) Alex de Minaur [9]	(France) Lucas Pouille [Q]	Walkover
Gentlemen's Singles 3rd Round (Note: This match was originally scheduled for Court 17, but was moved to No. 3 Court following Lucas Pouille's withdrawal.)	(France) Giovanni Mpetshi Perricard [LL]	(Finland) Emil Ruusuvuori	4–6, 6–2, 7–6^{(7–5)}, 6–4
Ladies' Singles 3rd Round	(United States) Danielle Collins [11]	(Brazil) Beatriz Haddad Maia [20]	6–4, 6–4
Gentlemen's Doubles 2nd Round	(United States) Rajeev Ram / (United Kingdom) Joe Salisbury [3] vs (Germany) Andreas Mies / (Australia) John-Patrick Smith		Postponed
Matches began at 11 am (1:30 pm on Centre Court and 1:00 pm on No. 1 Court) BST

== Day 7 (7 July) ==
- Seeds out:
  - Gentlemen's Singles: (Bulgaria) Grigor Dimitrov [10], (United States) Ben Shelton [14], (France) Ugo Humbert [16]
  - Ladies' Singles: (United States) Coco Gauff [2], (United States) Madison Keys [12]
  - Gentlemen's Doubles: (Mexico) Santiago González / (France) Édouard Roger-Vasselin [6], (Netherlands) Wesley Koolhof / (Croatia) Nikola Mektić [7]
  - Ladies' Doubles: (United States) Nicole Melichar-Martinez / (Australia) Ellen Perez [3]
  - Mixed Doubles: (Croatia) Ivan Dodig / (Chinese Taipei) Chan Hao-ching [8]
- Schedule of play

Matches on main courts
Matches on Centre Court
Event	Winner	Loser	Score
Gentlemen's Singles 4th Round	(Spain) Carlos Alcaraz [3]	(France) Ugo Humbert [16]	6–3, 6–4, 1–6, 7–5
Ladies' Singles 4th Round	(New Zealand) Lulu Sun [Q]	(United Kingdom) Emma Raducanu [WC]	6–2, 5–7, 6–2
Ladies' Singles 4th Round	(United States) Emma Navarro [19]	(United States) Coco Gauff [2]	6–4, 6–3
Matches on No. 1 Court
Event	Winner	Loser	Score
Ladies' Singles 4th Round	(Italy) Jasmine Paolini [7]	(United States) Madison Keys [12]	6–3, 6–7^{(6–8)}, 5–5, retired
Gentlemen's Singles 4th Round	(Italy) Jannik Sinner [1]	(United States) Ben Shelton [14]	6–2, 6–4, 7–6^{(11–9)}
Gentlemen's Singles 4th Round	Daniil Medvedev [5]	(Bulgaria) Grigor Dimitrov [10]	5–3, retired
Mixed Doubles 1st Round (Note: This match was originally scheduled for No. 3 Court, but was moved to No. 1 Court following the Dimitrov-Medvedev match.)	(United Kingdom) Marcus Willis [WC] (United Kingdom) Alicia Barnett [WC]	(Croatia) Ivan Dodig [8] (Chinese Taipei) Chan Hao-ching [8]	6–3, 3–6, [10–5]
Matches on No. 2 Court
Event	Winner	Loser	Score
Ladies' Singles 4th Round	(Croatia) Donna Vekić	(Spain) Paula Badosa [PR]	6–2, 1–6, 6–4
Gentlemen's Singles 4th Round	(United States) Tommy Paul [12]	(Spain) Roberto Bautista Agut	6–2, 7–6^{(7–3)}, 6–2
Mixed Doubles 1st Round	(United Kingdom) Lloyd Glasspool / (United Kingdom) Harriet Dart [WC] vs (France) Fabrice Martin / (Spain) Cristina Bucșa [PR]		Postponed
Matches on No. 3 Court
Event	Winner	Loser	Score
Gentlemen's Doubles 2nd Round	(United Kingdom) Neal Skupski [9] (New Zealand) Michael Venus [9]	(Australia) Rinky Hijikata (Australia) John Peers	6–4, 6–7^{(5–7)}, 6–4
Mixed Doubles 1st Round	(Argentina) Máximo González / (Norway) Ulrikke Eikeri vs (Netherlands) Jean-Julien Rojer / (United States) Bethanie Mattek-Sands		Postponed
Mixed Doubles 1st Round	(United States) Robert Galloway / (Estonia) Ingrid Neel vs (United Kingdom) Jamie Murray / (United States) Taylor Townsend		Postponed
Matches began at 11 am (1:30 pm on Centre Court and 1:00 pm on No. 1 Court) BST

== Day 8 (8 July) ==
- Seeds out:
  - Gentlemen's Singles: (Germany) Alexander Zverev [4], (Denmark) Holger Rune [15]
  - Ladies' Singles: (United States) Danielle Collins [11], Anna Kalinskaya [17]
  - Gentlemen's Doubles: (France) Sadio Doumbia / (France) Fabien Reboul [16]
  - Ladies' Doubles: (Italy) Sara Errani / (Italy) Jasmine Paolini [5], (United States) Sofia Kenin / (United States) Bethanie Mattek-Sands [14], (United States) Asia Muhammad / (Indonesia) Aldila Sutjiadi [15]
  - Mixed Doubles: (United States) Austin Krajicek / (Germany) Laura Siegemund [4]
- Schedule of play

Matches on main courts
Matches on Centre Court
Event	Winner	Loser	Score
Ladies' Singles 4th Round	(Kazakhstan) Elena Rybakina [4]	Anna Kalinskaya [17]	6–3, 3–0, retired
Gentlemen's Singles 4th Round	(United States) Taylor Fritz [13]	(Germany) Alexander Zverev [4]	4–6, 6–7^{(4–7)}, 6–4, 7–6^{(7–3)}, 6–3
Gentlemen's Singles 4th Round	(Serbia) Novak Djokovic [2]	(Denmark) Holger Rune [15]	6–3, 6–4, 6–2
Matches on No. 1 Court
Event	Winner	Loser	Score
Gentlemen's Singles 4th Round	(Australia) Alex de Minaur [9]	(France) Arthur Fils	6–2, 6–4, 4–6, 6–3
Ladies' Singles 4th Round	(Latvia) Jeļena Ostapenko [13]	(Kazakhstan) Yulia Putintseva	6–2, 6–3
Ladies' Singles 4th Round	(Czech Republic) Barbora Krejčíková [31]	(United States) Danielle Collins [11]	7–5, 6–3
Matches on No. 2 Court
Event	Winner	Loser	Score
Gentlemen's Singles 4th Round	(Italy) Lorenzo Musetti [25]	(France) Giovanni Mpetshi Perricard [LL]	4–6, 6–3, 6–3, 6–2
Ladies' Singles 4th Round	(Ukraine) Elina Svitolina [21]	(China) Wang Xinyu	6–2, 6–1
Mixed Doubles 1st Round	(United Kingdom) Jamie Murray (United States) Taylor Townsend	(Colombia) Nicolás Barrientos [ALT] (Japan) Miyu Kato [Alt]	6–3, 7–6^{(7–5)}
Mixed Doubles 1st Round	(Australia) Matthew Ebden / (Australia) Ellen Perez [1] vs (Argentina) Andrés Molteni / (United States) Asia Muhammad		5–3, suspended
Matches on No. 3 Court
Event	Winner	Loser	Score
Gentlemen's Doubles 3rd Round	(Spain) Marcel Granollers [1] (Argentina) Horacio Zeballos [1]	(Argentina) Sebastián Báez (Jamaica) Dustin Brown	6–3, 6–3
Ladies' Doubles 3rd Round	(United States) Coco Gauff [11] (United States) Jessica Pegula [11]	(Italy) Sara Errani [5] (Italy) Jasmine Paolini [5]	6–2, 6–4
Boys' Singles 1st Round	(United Kingdom) Charlie Robertson	(Germany) Max Schönhaus	6–4, 2–6, 6–3
Mixed Doubles 1st Round	(United States) Jackson Withrow / (Indonesia) Aldila Sutjiadi vs (Italy) Andrea Vavassori / (Italy) Sara Errani [5]		6–3, 3–6 suspended
Matches began at 11 am (1:30 pm on Centre Court and 1:00 pm on No. 1 Court) BST

== Day 9 (9 July) ==
- Seeds out:
  - Gentlemen's Singles: (Italy) Jannik Sinner [1], (United States) Tommy Paul [12]
  - Ladies' Singles: (United States) Emma Navarro [19]
  - Gentlemen's Doubles: (United States) Nathaniel Lammons / (United States) Jackson Withrow [12]
  - Ladies' Doubles: (Chinese Taipei) Chan Hao-ching / Veronika Kudermetova [12]
- Schedule of play

Matches on main courts
Matches on Centre Court
Event	Winner	Loser	Score
Gentlemen's Singles Quarter-finals	Daniil Medvedev [5]	(Italy) Jannik Sinner [1]	6–7^{(7–9)}, 6–4, 7–6^{(7–4)}, 2–6, 6–3
Ladies' Singles Quarter-finals	(Italy) Jasmine Paolini [7]	(United States) Emma Navarro [19]	6–2, 6–1
Ladies' Doubles 3rd Round	(Czech Republic) Barbora Krejčíková [8] (Germany) Laura Siegemund [8]	(Chinese Taipei) Chan Hao-ching [12] Veronika Kudermetova [12]	6–1, 6–2
Matches on No. 1 Court
Event	Winner	Loser	Score
Ladies's Singles Quarter-finals	(Croatia) Donna Vekić	(New Zealand) Lulu Sun [Q]	5–7, 6–4, 6–1
Gentlemen's Singles Quarter-finals	(Spain) Carlos Alcaraz [3]	(United States) Tommy Paul [12]	5–7, 6–4, 6–2, 6–2
Gentlemen's Doubles 3rd Round	(Germany) Kevin Krawietz [8] (Germany) Tim Pütz [8]	(United States) Nathaniel Lammons [12] (United States) Jackson Withrow [12]	6–3, 6–4
Ladies' Doubles 3rd Round	(Canada) Gabriela Dabrowski [2] (New Zealand) Erin Routliffe [2]	(Ukraine) Marta Kostyuk (Romania) Elena-Gabriela Ruse	6–3, 6–1
Matches on No. 2 Court
Event	Winner	Loser	Score
Mixed Doubles 1st Round	(Australia) Matthew Ebden / (Australia) Ellen Perez [1] vs (Argentina) Andrés Molteni / (United States) Asia Muhammad		3–6, 3–2 suspended
Mixed invitation doubles Round Robin	(Serbia) Nenad Zimonjić / (Austria) Barbara Schett vs (Sweden) Thomas Enqvist / (United States) Martina Navratilova		Postponed
Matches on No. 3 Court
Event	Winner	Loser	Score
Mixed Doubles 2nd Round	(United Kingdom) Neal Skupski / (United States) Desirae Krawczyk [6] vs (France) Fabrice Martin / (Spain) Cristina Bucșa [PR]		Postponed
Mixed Doubles 2nd Round	(United Kingdom) Jamie Murray / (United States) Taylor Townsend vs (Germany) Kevin Krawietz / Alexandra Panova		Postponed
Gentlemen's Wheelchair singles 1st Round	(United Kingdom) Ben Bartram [WC] vs (United Kingdom) Alfie Hewett [2]		Postponed
Gentlemen's Wheelchair singles 1st Round	(United Kingdom) Gordon Reid vs (Argentina) Gustavo Fernández [2]		Postponed
Ladies' Wheelchair singles 1st Round	(South Africa) Kgothatso Montjane vs (United Kingdom) Lucy Shuker		Postponed
Ladies' Wheelchair singles 1st Round	(Netherlands) Diede De Groot [1] vs (Japan) Momoko Ohtani		Postponed
Matches begin at 11 am (1:30 pm on Centre Court and 1:00 pm on No. 1 Court) BST

== Day 10 (10 July) ==
- Seeds out:
  - Gentlemen's Singles: (Australia) Alex de Minaur [9], (United States) Taylor Fritz [13]
  - Ladies' Singles: (Latvia) Jeļena Ostapenko [13], (Ukraine) Elina Svitolina [21]
  - Gentlemen's Doubles: (El Salvador) Marcelo Arévalo / (Croatia) Mate Pavić [4], (Germany) Kevin Krawietz / (Germany) Tim Pütz [8], (Argentina) Máximo González / (Argentina) Andrés Molteni [11]
  - Ladies' Doubles: (Czech Republic) Barbora Krejčíková / (Germany) Laura Siegemund [8], (Ukraine) Lyudmyla Kichenok / (Latvia) Jeļena Ostapenko [9], (United States) Coco Gauff / (United States) Jessica Pegula [11]
  - Mixed Doubles: (Australia) Matthew Ebden / (Australia) Ellen Perez [1], (Italy) Andrea Vavassori / (Italy) Sara Errani [5]
- Schedule of play

Matches on main courts
Matches on Centre Court
Event	Winner	Loser	Score
Ladies' Singles Quarter-finals	(Kazakhstan) Elena Rybakina [4]	(Ukraine) Elina Svitolina [21]	6–3, 6–2
Gentlemen's Singles Quarter-finals	(Serbia) Novak Djokovic [2]	(Australia) Alex de Minaur [9]	Walkover
Mixed Doubles 2nd Round	(Poland) Jan Zieliński [7] (Chinese Taipei) Hsieh Su-wei [7]	(United Kingdom) Joe Salisbury (United Kingdom) Heather Watson	7–6^{(7–4)}, 6–4
Ladies' invitation doubles	(Australia) Ashleigh Barty (Australia) Casey Dellacqua	(Germany) Andrea Petkovic (Slovakia) Magdaléna Rybáriková	5–7, 6–3, [10–7]
Matches on No. 1 Court
Event	Winner	Loser	Score
Ladies' Singles Quarter-finals	(Czech Republic) Barbora Krejčíková [31]	(Latvia) Jeļena Ostapenko [13]	6–4, 7–6^{(7–4)}
Gentlemen's Singles Quarter-finals	(Italy) Lorenzo Musetti [25]	(United States) Taylor Fritz [13]	3–6, 7–6^{(7–5)}, 6–2, 3–6, 6–1
Mixed Doubles 2nd Round	(United Kingdom) Neal Skupski [6] (United States) Desirae Krawczyk [6]	(France) Fabrice Martin [PR] (Spain) Cristina Bucșa [PR]	6–3, 6–3
Mixed Doubles 2nd Round	(New Zealand) Michael Venus [2] (New Zealand) Erin Routliffe [2]	(United Kingdom) Henry Patten [WC] (United Kingdom) Olivia Nicholls [WC]	5–7, 7–5, [11–9]
Matches on No. 2 Court
Event	Winner	Loser	Score
Ladies' Doubles Quarter-finals	(Chinese Taipei) Hsieh Su-wei [1] (Belgium) Elise Mertens [1]	(United States) Coco Gauff [11] (United States) Jessica Pegula [11]	6–2, 6–1
Mixed Doubles 2nd Round	(United Kingdom) Marcus Willis [WC] (United Kingdom) Alicia Barnett [WC]	(United States) Rajeev Ram [Alt] (United States) Katie Volynets [Alt]	2–6, 6–3, [11–9]
Gentlemen's invitation Doubles	(Colombia) Juan Sebastián Cabal (Colombia) Robert Farah	(United Kingdom) Jamie Delgado (France) Sébastien Grosjean	7–5, 6–3
Ladies' Doubles Quarter-finals	(Czech Republic) Kateřina Siniaková [4] (United States) Taylor Townsend [4]	(Ukraine) Lyudmyla Kichenok [9] (Latvia) Jeļena Ostapenko [9]	6–1, 6–3
Mixed Doubles 2nd Round	(United Kingdom) Jamie Murray (United States) Taylor Townsend	(Germany) Kevin Krawietz; Alexandra Panova	6–7^{(3–7)}, 6–1, [10–5]
Matches on No. 3 Court
Event	Winner	Loser	Score
Ladies' Doubles Quarter-finals	(United States) Caroline Dolehide [7] (United States) Desirae Krawczyk [7]	(Hungary) Tímea Babos (Ukraine) Nadiia Kichenok	1–6, 6–2, 6–0
Gentlemen's Doubles Quarter-finals	(Spain) Marcel Granollers [1] (Argentina) Horacio Zeballos [1]	(Germany) Kevin Krawietz [8] (Germany) Tim Pütz [8]	6–4, 7–6^{(7–3)}
Gentlemen's invitation Doubles	(United States) James Blake (Brazil) Bruno Soares	(France) Jérémy Chardy (Spain) Feliciano López	6–4, 4–6, [10–1]
Ladies' Doubles Quarter-finals	(Canada) Gabriela Dabrowski [2] (New Zealand) Erin Routliffe [2]	(Czech Republic) Barbora Krejčíková [8] (Germany) Laura Siegemund [8]	6–4, 6–7^{(5–7)}, 6–4
Mixed invitation doubles Round Robin	(Australia) Mark Woodforde (Slovakia) Dominika Cibulková	(United Kingdom) Greg Rusedski (Croatia) Iva Majoli	6–3, 6–4
Matches began at 11 am (1:30 pm on Centre Court and 1:00 pm on No. 1 Court) BST

== Day 11 (11 July) ==
- Seeds out:
  - Ladies' Singles: (Kazakhstan) Elena Rybakina [4]
  - Gentlemen's Doubles: (Spain) Marcel Granollers / (Argentina) Horacio Zeballos [1], (United Kingdom) Neal Skupski / (New Zealand) Michael Venus [9]
  - Mixed Doubles: (United Kingdom) Neal Skupski / (United States) Desirae Krawczyk [6]
- Schedule of play

Matches on main courts
Matches on Centre Court
Event	Winner	Loser	Score
Ladies' Singles Semi-finals	(Italy) Jasmine Paolini [7]	(Croatia) Donna Vekić	2–6, 6–4, 7–6^{(10–8)}
Ladies' Singles Semi-finals	(Czech Republic) Barbora Krejčíková [31]	(Kazakhstan) Elena Rybakina [4]	3–6, 6–3, 6–4
Ladies' invitation doubles	(Belgium) Kim Clijsters (Switzerland) Martina Hingis	(Poland) Agnieszka Radwańska (Italy) Francesca Schiavone	6–3, 6–2
Matches on No. 1 Court
Event	Winner	Loser	Score
Gentlemen's Doubles Semi-finals	(Australia) Max Purcell [15] (Australia) Jordan Thompson [15]	(Spain) Marcel Granollers [1] (Argentina) Horacio Zeballos [1]	6–4, 6–4
Gentlemen's Doubles Semi-finals	(Finland) Harri Heliövaara (United Kingdom) Henry Patten	(United Kingdom) Neal Skupski [9] (New Zealand) Michael Venus [9]	6–4, 7–6^{(7–1)}
Mixed Doubles Quarter-finals	(Mexico) Santiago González (Mexico) Giuliana Olmos	(United Kingdom) Marcus Willis (United Kingdom) Alicia Barnett [WC]	6–3, 7–5
Gentlemen's Wheelchair Doubles Quarter-finals	(United Kingdom) Alfie Hewett [1] (United Kingdom) Gordon Reid [1]	(Spain) Martín de la Puente (Belgium) Joachim Gérard	6–1, 7–5
Matches on No. 2 Court
Event	Winner	Loser	Score
Gentlemen's invitation Doubles	(United States) Bob Bryan (United States) Mike Bryan	(Cyprus) Marcos Baghdatis (Belgium) Xavier Malisse	6–3, 6–3
Mixed Doubles Quarterfinals	(Argentina) Máximo González (Norway) Ulrikke Eikeri	(United States) Nathaniel Lammons (Japan) Ena Shibahara	6–4, 3–6, [11–9]
Mixed Doubles Quarterfinals	(Poland) Jan Zieliński [7] (Chinese Taipei) Hsieh Su-wei [7]	(United Kingdom) Jamie Murray (United States) Taylor Townsend	7–6^{(7–2)}, 6–7^{(7–9)}, [10–5]
Ladies' invitation doubles	(Australia) Ashleigh Barty (Australia) Casey Dellacqua	(Italy) Roberta Vinci (China) Zheng Jie	6–2, 6–4
Matches on No. 3 Court
Event	Winner	Loser	Score
Ladies' invitation doubles	(Germany) Andrea Petkovic (Slovakia) Magdaléna Rybáriková	(United Kingdom) Johanna Konta (United States) CoCo Vandeweghe	6–3, 6–4
Gentlemen's Wheelchair Singles Quarterfinals	(United Kingdom) Alfie Hewett [2]	(France) Stéphane Houdet	6–1, 6–4
Quad Wheelchair Doubles Semifinals	(United Kingdom) Andy Lapthorne [2] (Israel) Guy Sasson [2]	(Turkey) Ahmet Kaplan (United States) David Wagner	6–2, 6–4
Ladies' Wheelchair Doubles Quarterfinals	(Netherlands) Diede de Groot (Netherlands) Jiske Griffioen	(Argentina) María Florencia Moreno (Japan) Momoko Ohtani	6–0, 6–0
Mixed invitation doubles	(Australia) Mark Woodforde (Slovakia) Dominika Cibulková	(France) Mansour Bahrami (Australia) Alicia Molik	7–6^{(7–2)}, 7–6^{(7–5)}
Matches began at 11 am (1:30 pm on Centre Court and 1:00 pm on No. 1 Court) BST

== Day 12 (12 July) ==
- Seeds out:
  - Gentlemen's Singles: Daniil Medvedev [5], (Italy) Lorenzo Musetti [25]
  - Ladies' Doubles: (Chinese Taipei) Hsieh Su-wei / (Belgium) Elise Mertens [1], (United States) Caroline Dolehide / (United States) Desirae Krawczyk [7]
  - Mixed Doubles: (New Zealand) Michael Venus / (New Zealand) Erin Routliffe [2]
- Schedule of play

Matches on main courts
Matches on Centre Court
Event	Winner	Loser	Score
Gentlemen's Singles Semi-finals	(Spain) Carlos Alcaraz [3]	Daniil Medvedev [5]	6–7^{(1–7)}, 6–3, 6–4, 6–4
Gentlemen's Singles Semi-finals	(Serbia) Novak Djokovic [2]	(Italy) Lorenzo Musetti [25]	6–4, 7–6^{(7–2)}, 6–4
Matches on No. 1 Court
Event	Winner	Loser	Score
Ladies' Doubles Semi-finals	(Czech Republic) Kateřina Siniaková [4] (United States) Taylor Townsend [4]	(Chinese Taipei) Hsieh Su-wei [1] (Belgium) Elise Mertens [1]	3–6, 6–4, 6–4
Ladies' Doubles Semi-finals	(Canada) Gabriela Dabrowski [2] (New Zealand) Erin Routliffe [2]	(United States) Caroline Dolehide [7] (United States) Desirae Krawczyk [7]	6–4, 6–3
Mixed Doubles Semi-finals	(Mexico) Santiago González (Mexico) Giuliana Olmos	(Argentina) Máximo González (Norway) Ulrikke Eikeri	6–3, 7–6^{(7–0)}
Mixed Doubles Semi-finals	(Poland) Jan Zieliński [7] (Chinese Taipei) Hsieh Su-wei [7]	(New Zealand) Michael Venus [2] (New Zealand) Erin Routliffe [2]	7–6^{(7–0)}, 6–3
Matches on No. 3 Court
Event	Winner	Loser	Score
Gentlemen's Wheelchair singles Semi-finals	(United Kingdom) Alfie Hewett [2]	(Argentina) Gustavo Fernández [3]	4–6, 6–4, 7–5
Mixed invitation doubles Round Robin	(Sweden) Jonas Björkman (United Kingdom) Anne Keothavong	(Sweden) Thomas Enqvist (United States) Martina Navratilova	7–6^{(7–5)}, 6–4
Ladies' invitation doubles Round Robin	(Poland) Agnieszka Radwańska (Italy) Francesca Schiavone	(Slovakia) Daniela Hantuchová (United Kingdom) Laura Robson	7–6^{(9–7)}, 6–2
Gentlemen's Wheelchair doubles Semi-finals	(United Kingdom) Alfie Hewett (United Kingdom) Gordon Reid	(Netherlands) Tom Egberink (Netherlands) Maikel Scheffers	6–1, 7–6^{(14–12)}
Matches began at 12 pm (1:30 pm on Centre Court and 1:00 pm on No. 1 Court) BST

== Day 13 (13 July) ==
- Seeds out:
  - Ladies' Singles: (Italy) Jasmine Paolini [7]
  - Gentlemen's Doubles: (Australia) Max Purcell / (Australia) Jordan Thompson [15]
  - Ladies' Doubles: (Canada) Gabriela Dabrowski / (New Zealand) Erin Routliffe [2]
- Schedule of play

Matches on main courts
Matches on Centre Court
Event	Winner	Loser	Score
Ladies' Singles Final	(Czech Republic) Barbora Krejčíková [31]	(Italy) Jasmine Paolini [7]	6–2, 2–6, 6–4
Gentlemen's Doubles Final	(Finland) Harri Heliövaara (United Kingdom) Henry Patten	(Australia) Max Purcell [15] (Australia) Jordan Thompson [15]	7–6^{(9–7)}, 6–7^{(8–10)}, 7–6^{(11–9)}
Ladies' Doubles Final	(Czech Republic) Kateřina Siniaková [4] (United States) Taylor Townsend [4]	(Canada) Gabriela Dabrowski [2] (New Zealand) Erin Routliffe [2]	7–6^{(7–5)}, 7–6^{(7–1)}
Matches on No. 1 Court
Event	Winner	Loser	Score
Ladies' Wheelchair Singles Final	(Netherlands) Diede de Groot [1]	(Netherlands) Aniek van Koot [4]	6–4, 6–4
Ladies' invitation doubles Round Robin	(Belgium) Kim Clijsters (Switzerland) Martina Hingis	(Zimbabwe) Cara Black (Australia) Samantha Stosur	7–5, 7–5
Gentlemen's invitation Doubles	(United States) Bob Bryan (United States) Mike Bryan	(United States) James Blake (Brazil) Bruno Soares	7–5, 6–3
Matches on No. 3 Court
Event	Winner	Loser	Score
Wheelchair Quad Doubles Final	(Netherlands) Sam Schröder [1] (Netherlands) Niels Vink [1]	(United Kingdom) Andy Lapthorne [2] (Israel) Guy Sasson [2]	3–6, 7–6^{(7–3)}, 6–3
Gentlemen's Wheelchair Doubles Semi-finals	(Japan) Takuya Miki [2] (Japan) Tokito Oda [2]	(United Kingdom) Ben Bartram (Spain) Daniel Caverzaschi	6–4, 6–1
Matches began at 11 am (2 pm on Centre Court) BST

== Day 14 (14 July) ==
- Seeds out:
  - Gentlemen's Singles: (Serbia) Novak Djokovic [2]
- Schedule of play

Matches on main courts
Matches on Centre Court
Event	Winner	Loser	Score
Gentlemen's Singles Final	(Spain) Carlos Alcaraz [3]	(Serbia) Novak Djokovic [2]	6–2, 6–2, 7–6^{(7–4)}
Mixed Doubles Final	(Poland) Jan Zieliński [7] (Chinese Taipei) Hsieh Su-wei [7]	(Mexico) Santiago González (Mexico) Giuliana Olmos	6–4, 6–2
Matches on No. 1 Court
Event	Winner	Loser	Score
Gentlemen's Wheelchair Singles Final	(United Kingdom) Alfie Hewett [2]	(Spain) Martín de la Puente [4]	6–2, 6–3
Boys' Singles Final	(Norway) Nicolai Budkov Kjær [2]	(Netherlands) Mees Röttgering	6–3, 6–3
Girls' singles Final	(Slovakia) Renáta Jamrichová [1]	(Australia) Emerson Jones [3]	6–3, 6–3
Matches on No. 3 Court
Event	Winner	Loser	Score
Wheelchair Quad Singles Final	(Netherlands) Niels Vink [2]	(Netherlands) Sam Schröder [1]	7–6^{(7–4)}, 6–4
Ladies' Wheelchair Doubles Final	(Japan) Yui Kamiji [1] (South Africa) Kgothatso Montjane [1]	(Netherlands) Diede de Groot [2] (Netherlands) Jiske Griffioen [2]	6–4, 6–4
Wheelchair Men's doubles Final	(United Kingdom) Alfie Hewett [1] (United Kingdom) Gordon Reid [1]	(Japan) Takuya Miki [2] (Japan) Tokito Oda [2]	6–4, 7–6^{(7–2)}
Matches began at 11 am (2 pm on Centre Court) BST
