= 2024 Wimbledon Championships – Boys' doubles =

Boys' doubles
- 2024 Wimbledon Championships

Final
- Champions: (United States) Alexander Razeghi (Germany) Max Schönhaus
- Runners-up: (Czech Republic) Jan Klimas (Czech Republic) Jan Kumstát
- Score: 7–6^{(7–1)}, 6–4

Events
Singles	men	women		boys	girls
Doubles	men	women	mixed	boys	girls
WC Singles	men	women	quad
WC Doubles	men	women	quad
14&U Singles	boys	girls
Legends	men	women	mixed
- Wimbledon Championships

Alexander Razeghi and Max Schönhaus won the boys' doubles title at the 2024 Wimbledon Championships, defeating Jan Klimas and Jan Kumstát in the final, 7–6^{(7–1)}, 6–4.

Jakub Filip and Gabriele Vulpitta were the reigning champions, but were no longer eligible to participate in junior tournaments.

== Seeds ==
1. (Italy) Federico Cinà / (Czech Republic) Maxim Mrva (quarterfinals)
2. (Czech Republic) Petr Brunclík / (South Korea) Kim Jang-jun (first round)
3. (United States) Kaylan Bigun / (United States) Jagger Leach (semifinals)
4. (France) Thomas Faurel / (Romania) Luca Preda (first round)
5. (Serbia) Marko Maksimović / (France) Théo Papamalamis (second round)
6. (Norway) Nicolai Budkov Kjær / (United Kingdom) Viktor Frydrych (quarterfinals)
7. (United States) Maxwell Exsted / (United States) Cooper Woestendick (semifinals)
8. (Poland) Tomasz Berkieta / (United Kingdom) Charlie Robertson (first round)

== Draw ==
Key

- Q = Qualifier
- WC = Wild card
- LL = Lucky loser
- Alt = Alternate
- ITF = ITF entry
- PR = Protected ranking
- SR = Special ranking
- SE = Special exempt
- JE = Junior exempt
- JR = Junior Accelerator Programme entrant
- CO = College Accelerator Programme entrant
- NG = Next Gen Accelerator Program entrant
- w/o = Walkover
- r = Retired
- d = Defaulted

=== Finals ===
Semifinals
(United States) Alexander Razeghi (Germany) Max Schönhaus	7^{7}	6
3	(United States) Kaylan Bigun (United States) Jagger Leach	6^{2}	3
(Czech Republic) Jan Klimas (Czech Republic) Jan Kumstát	6	7
7	(United States) Maxwell Exsted (United States) Cooper Woestendick	4	5

Final
(United States) Alexander Razeghi (Germany) Max Schönhaus	7^{7}	6
(Czech Republic) Jan Klimas (Czech Republic) Jan Kumstát	6^{1}	4

=== Top half ===
First round
1	(Italy) Federico Cinà (Czech Republic) Maxim Mrva	6	6
(United States) Matthew Forbes (United States) Kase Schinnerer	4	2
(Cyprus) Andreas Timini (Bulgaria) Alexander Vasilev	6	6
(Morocco) Reda Bennani (France) Moïse Kouamé	4	4
WC	(United Kingdom) Maximilian Carrier (United Kingdom) Zechariah Hamrouni	4	4
(United States) Alexander Razeghi (Germany) Max Schönhaus	6	6
(Japan) Naoya Honda (France) Nathan Trouvé	6	7^{7}
8	(Poland) Tomasz Berkieta (United Kingdom) Charlie Robertson	3	6^{1}
3	(United States) Kaylan Bigun (United States) Jagger Leach	6	5	[10]
WC	(United Kingdom) Jay Johnson-Hauldren (United Kingdom) Rhys Lawlor	4	7	[7]
(Brazil) Enzo Kohlmann de Freitas (Germany) Tom Sickenberger	7^{7}	4	[8]
Timofei Derepasko (Kazakhstan) Amir Omarkhanov	6^{5}	6	[10]
(Spain) Izan Almazán Valiente (Brazil) Gustavo Ribeiro de Almeida	6^{2}	7	[11]
(United Kingdom) Benjamin Gusic Wan (United Kingdom) Henry Jefferson	7^{7}	5	[9]
(Colombia) Miguel Tobón (Argentina) Máximo Zeitune	6^{2}	4
6	(Norway) Nicolai Budkov Kjær (United Kingdom) Viktor Frydrych	7^{7}	6

Second round
1	(Italy) F Cinà (Czech Republic) M Mrva	6	6
(Cyprus) A Timini (Bulgaria) A Vasilev	4	4
(United States) A Razeghi (Germany) M Schönhaus	6	7
(Japan) N Honda (France) N Trouvé	3	5
3	(United States) K Bigun (United States) J Leach	7^{7}	6
T Derepasko (Kazakhstan) A Omarkhanov	6^{5}	3
(Spain) I Almazán Valiente (Brazil) G Ribeiro de Almeida	5	6	[8]
6	(Norway) N Budkov Kjær (United Kingdom) V Frydrych	7	3	[10]

Quarterfinals
1	(Italy) F Cinà (Czech Republic) M Mrva	6	5	[9]
(United States) A Razeghi (Germany) M Schönhaus	3	7	[11]
3	(United States) K Bigun (United States) J Leach	7^{11}	4	[10]
6	(Norway) N Budkov Kjær (United Kingdom) V Frydrych	6^{9}	6	[7]

Semifinals
(United States) A Razeghi (Germany) M Schönhaus	7^{7}	6
3	(United States) K Bigun (United States) J Leach	6^{2}	3

=== Bottom half ===
First round
5	(Serbia) Marko Maksimović (France) Théo Papamalamis	6	6
(Australia) Hayden Jones (Australia) Pavle Marinkov	2	3
(Turkey) Atakan Karahan (South Korea) Roh Ho-young	1	6	[2]
(Czech Republic) Jan Klimas (Czech Republic) Jan Kumstát	6	3	[10]
WC	(United Kingdom) Conor Brady (United Kingdom) Luke Hooper	1	6	[10]
(United States) Jack Kennedy (United States) Ian Mayew	6	2	[5]
(Spain) Rafael Jódar (Spain) Andrés Santamarta Roig	6	6
4	(France) Thomas Faurel (Romania) Luca Preda	4	3
7	(United States) Maxwell Exsted (United States) Cooper Woestendick	6	6
(South Korea) Hwang Dong-hyun (Sweden) William Rejchtman Vinciguerra	3	2
(Switzerland) Henry Bernet (Switzerland) Flynn Thomas	6	6
WC	(United Kingdom) Mark Ceban (United Kingdom) Charlie Swaine	4	3
Daniil Sarksian (China) Zhang Tianhui	7	6
(Italy) Lorenzo Angelini (United Kingdom) Oliver Bonding	5	4
(Italy) Andrea De Marchi (Italy) Daniele Rapagnetta	6	1	[12]
2	(Czech Republic) Petr Brunclík (South Korea) Kim Jang-jun	4	6	[10]

Second round
5	(Serbia) M Maksimović (France) T Papamalamis	6^{9}	6^{7}
(Czech Republic) J Klimas (Czech Republic) J Kumstát	7^{11}	7^{9}
WC	(United Kingdom) C Brady (United Kingdom) L Hooper	4	6	[7]
(Spain) R Jódar (Spain) A Santamarta Roig	6	2	[10]
7	(United States) M Exsted (United States) C Woestendick	7^{7}	6
(Switzerland) H Bernet (Switzerland) F Thomas	6^{5}	1
D Sarksian (China) T Zhang	5	6	[10]
(Italy) A De Marchi (Italy) D Rapagnetta	7	4	[0]

Quarterfinals
(Czech Republic) J Klimas (Czech Republic) J Kumstát	4	7^{7}	[10]
(Spain) R Jódar (Spain) A Santamarta Roig	6	6^{2}	[7]
7	(United States) M Exsted (United States) C Woestendick	6	6^{2}	[10]
D Sarksian (China) T Zhang	4	7^{7}	[2]

Semifinals
(Czech Republic) J Klimas (Czech Republic) J Kumstát	6	7
7	(United States) M Exsted (United States) C Woestendick	4	5
