= 2024 Wimbledon Championships – Girls' doubles =

Girls' doubles
- 2024 Wimbledon Championships

Final
- Champions: (Italy) Tyra Caterina Grant (United States) Iva Jovic
- Runners-up: (United Kingdom) Mika Stojsavljevic (United Kingdom) Mingge Xu
- Score: 7–5, 4–6, [10–8]

Events
Singles	men	women		boys	girls
Doubles	men	women	mixed	boys	girls
WC Singles	men	women	quad
WC Doubles	men	women	quad
Legends	men	women	mixed
14&U Singles	boys	girls
- Wimbledon Championships

Tyra Caterina Grant and Iva Jovic won the girls' doubles title at the 2024 Wimbledon Championships, defeating Mika Stojsavljevic and Mingge Xu in the final, 7–5, 4–6, [10–8].

Alena Kovačková and Laura Samson (formerly Samsonová) were the defending champions, but lost in the quarterfinals to Stojsavljevic and Xu.

== Seeds ==
1. (Czech Republic) Alena Kovačková / (Czech Republic) Laura Samson (quarterfinals)
2. (United States) Tyra Caterina Grant / (United States) Iva Jovic (champions)
3. (Slovakia) Renáta Jamrichová / (Japan) Ena Koike (second round)
4. (United States) Kaitlyn Rolls / (Belgium) Jeline Vandromme (first round)
5. (Bulgaria) Iva Ivanova / (Japan) Wakana Sonobe (quarterfinals)
6. (Australia) Emerson Jones / (Italy) Vittoria Paganetti (semifinals)
7. (United Kingdom) Mika Stojsavljevic / (United Kingdom) Mingge Xu (final)
8. (Japan) Mayu Crossley / (United States) Akasha Urhobo (first round)

== Draw ==
Key

- Q = Qualifier
- WC = Wild card
- LL = Lucky loser
- Alt = Alternate
- ITF = ITF entry
- PR = Protected ranking
- SR = Special ranking
- SE = Special exempt
- JE = Junior exempt
- JR = Junior Accelerator Programme entrant
- CO = College Accelerator Programme entrant
- NG = Next Gen Accelerator Program entrant
- w/o = Walkover
- r = Retired
- d = Defaulted

=== Finals ===
Semifinals
7	(United Kingdom) Mika Stojsavljevic (United Kingdom) Mingge Xu	6	6
(Czech Republic) Julie Paštiková (Germany) Julia Stusek	4	1
6	(Australia) Emerson Jones (Italy) Vittoria Paganetti	5	6^{5}
2	(Italy) Tyra Caterina Grant (United States) Iva Jovic	7	7^{7}

Final
7	(United Kingdom) Mika Stojsavljevic (United Kingdom) Mingge Xu	5	6	[8]
2	(Italy) Tyra Caterina Grant (United States) Iva Jovic	7	4	[10]

=== Top half ===
First round
1	(Czech Republic) Alena Kovačková (Czech Republic) Laura Samson	6	4	[10]
(Romania) Eva Maria Ionescu (Sweden) Lea Nilsson	4	6	[7]
(Argentina) Luna María Cinalli (Chile) Antonia Vergara Rivera	4	2
(Israel) Mika Buchnik (Brazil) Olivia Carneiro	6	6
(United States) Annika Penickova (United States) Kristina Penickova	2	1
(Morocco) Malak El Allami (Norway) Emily Sartz-Lunde	6	6
(Czech Republic) Vendula Valdmannová (Germany) Sonja Zhenikhova	3	1
7	(United Kingdom) Mika Stojsavljevic (United Kingdom) Mingge Xu	6	6
3	(Slovakia) Renáta Jamrichová (Japan) Ena Koike	6	6
WC	(United Kingdom) Flora Johnson (United Kingdom) Allegra Korpanec Davies	0	1
(Kazakhstan) Asylzhan Arystanbekhova (Kazakhstan) Sonja Zhiyenbayeva	7^{7}	7^{7}
(United States) Christasha McNeil (Slovakia) Mia Pohánková	6^{5}	6^{3}
WC	(United Kingdom) Hephzibah Oluwadare (United Kingdom) Gabia Paskauskas	3	6	[10]
(United States) Thea Frodin (United States) Shannon Lam	6	3	[3]
(Czech Republic) Julie Paštiková (Germany) Julia Stusek	6	5	[10]
8	(Japan) Mayu Crossley (United States) Akasha Urhobo	2	7	[5]

Second round
1	(Czech Republic) A Kovačková (Czech Republic) L Samson	6	6
(Israel) M Buchnik (Brazil) O Carneiro	4	4
(Morocco) M El Allami (Norway) E Sartz-Lunde	1	7	[9]
7	(United Kingdom) M Stojsavljevic (United Kingdom) M Xu	6	5	[11]
3	(Slovakia) R Jamrichová (Japan) E Koike	2	6	[6]
(Kazakhstan) A Arystanbekhova (Kazakhstan) S Zhiyenbayeva	6	3	[10]
WC	(United Kingdom) H Oluwadare (United Kingdom) G Paskauskas	3	3
(Czech Republic) J Paštiková (Germany) J Stusek	6	6

Quarterfinals
1	(Czech Republic) A Kovačková (Czech Republic) L Samson	4	5
7	(United Kingdom) M Stojsavljevic (United Kingdom) M Xu	6	6
(Kazakhstan) A Arystanbekhova (Kazakhstan) S Zhiyenbayeva	0	5
(Czech Republic) J Paštiková (Germany) J Stusek	6	7

Semifinals
7	(United Kingdom) M Stojsavljevic (United Kingdom) M Xu	6	6
(Czech Republic) J Paštiková (Germany) J Stusek	4	1

=== Bottom half ===
First round
6	(Australia) Emerson Jones (Italy) Vittoria Paganetti	3	7^{7}	[10]
(Czech Republic) Eliška Ticháčková (Czech Republic) Lucie Urbanová	6	6^{5}	[7]
(Bulgaria) Rositsa Dencheva (Bulgaria) Elizara Yaneva	6	1	[10]
(United Kingdom) Hannah Klugman (United Kingdom) Isabelle Lacy	3	6	[7]
WC	(United Kingdom) Brooke Black (United Kingdom) Hannah Read	3	4
(Japan) Reina Goto (Spain) Ruth Roura Llaverias	6	6
(Netherlands) Joy de Zeeuw (Netherlands) Rose Marie Nijkamp	6	6
4	(United States) Kaitlyn Rolls (Belgium) Jeline Vandromme	4	2
5	(Bulgaria) Iva Ivanova (Japan) Wakana Sonobe	7^{8}	3	[11]
(Brazil) Victória Luiza Barros (Serbia) Teodora Kostović	6^{6}	6	[9]
(Italy) Noemi Basiletti (Austria) Lilli Tagger	7^{7}	6^{5}	[10]
(Dominican Republic) Anna María Fedotova (Czech Republic) Tereza Krejčová	6^{4}	7^{7}	[5]
(United Kingdom) Daniela Piani (United Kingdom) Hollie Smart	6	6
(Ukraine) Yelyzaveta Kotliar (Poland) Monika Stankiewicz	4	4
(Spain) Charo Esquiva Bañuls (South Korea) Jang Ga-eul	3	0
2	(Italy) Tyra Caterina Grant (United States) Iva Jovic	6	6

Second round
6	(Australia) E Jones (Italy) V Paganetti	6	4	[10]
(Bulgaria) R Dencheva (Bulgaria) E Yaneva	3	6	[6]
(Japan) R Goto (Spain) R Roura Llaverias	5	7^{7}	[10]
(Netherlands) J de Zeeuw (Netherlands) RM Nijkamp	7	6^{4}	[5]
5	(Bulgaria) I Ivanova (Japan) W Sonobe	6	6
(Italy) N Basiletti (Austria) L Tagger	2	2
(United Kingdom) D Piani (United Kingdom) H Smart	3	4
2	(Italy) TC Grant (United States) I Jovic	6	6

Quarterfinals
6	(Australia) E Jones (Italy) V Paganetti	6	6
(Japan) R Goto (Spain) R Roura Llaverias	3	3
5	(Bulgaria) I Ivanova (Japan) W Sonobe	2	1
2	(Italy) TC Grant (United States) I Jovic	6	6

Semifinals
6	(Australia) E Jones (Italy) V Paganetti	5	6^{5}
2	(Italy) TC Grant (United States) I Jovic	7	7^{7}
