= 2024 Wimbledon Championships – Boys' singles =

Boys' singles
- 2024 Wimbledon Championships

Final
- Champion: (Norway) Nicolai Budkov Kjær
- Runner-up: (Netherlands) Mees Röttgering
- Score: 6–3, 6–3

Events
Singles	men	women		boys	girls
Doubles	men	women	mixed	boys	girls
WC Singles	men	women	quad
WC Doubles	men	women	quad
14&U Singles	boys	girls
Legends	men	women	mixed
- Wimbledon Championships

Nicolai Budkov Kjær won the title, defeating Mees Röttgering in the final, 6–3, 6–3. Budkov Kjær became the first Norwegian player to win a junior Wimbledon and Grand Slam tournament singles title.

Henry Searle was the defending champion, but chose not to compete in the junior event. He received a wildcard into the men's singles event, where he lost in the first round to Marcos Giron.

== Seeds ==
1. (United States) Kaylan Bigun (quarterfinals)
2. (Norway) Nicolai Budkov Kjær (champion)
3. (Italy) Federico Cinà (third round)
4. (Poland) Tomasz Berkieta (third round)
5. (Romania) Luca Preda (first round)
6. (Czech Republic) Jan Kumstát (second round)
7. (Australia) Hayden Jones (second round)
8. (Czech Republic) Petr Brunclík (second round)
9. (South Korea) Kim Jang-jun (second round)
10. (Czech Republic) Maxim Mrva (quarterfinals)
11. (Colombia) Miguel Tobón (first round)
12. (Serbia) Marko Maksimović (first round)
13. (Kazakhstan) Amir Omarkhanov (third round)
14. (Morocco) Reda Bennani (second round)
15. (United States) Cooper Woestendick (third round)
16. (France) Théo Papamalamis (semifinals)

Click on the seed number of a player to go to their draw section.

== Draw ==
Key

- Q = Qualifier
- WC = Wild card
- LL = Lucky loser
- Alt = Alternate
- ITF = ITF entry
- PR = Protected ranking
- SR = Special ranking
- SE = Special exempt
- JE = Junior exempt
- JR = Junior Accelerator Programme entrant
- CO = College Accelerator Programme entrant
- NG = Next Gen Accelerator Program entrant
- w/o = Walkover
- r = Retired
- d = Defaulted

=== Finals ===
Quarterfinals
1	(United States) Kaylan Bigun	6^{3}	3
(Netherlands) Mees Röttgering	7^{7}	6
16	(France) Théo Papamalamis	6	6
(United States) Jagger Leach	3	3
(Japan) Naoya Honda	6	6
(Spain) Rafael Jódar	4	4
10	(Czech Republic) Maxim Mrva	6^{2}	4
2	(Norway) Nicolai Budkov Kjær	7^{7}	6

Semifinals
(Netherlands) Mees Röttgering	6	7
16	(France) Théo Papamalamis	4	5
(Japan) Naoya Honda	3	2
2	(Norway) Nicolai Budkov Kjær	6	6

Final
(Netherlands) Mees Röttgering	3	3
2	(Norway) Nicolai Budkov Kjær	6	6

=== Top half ===
==== Section 1 ====
First round
1	(United States) Kaylan Bigun	6	6
WC	(United Kingdom) Maximilian Carrier	0	3
(Argentina) Máximo Zeitune	6^{4}	6^{3}
(France) Thomas Faurel	7^{7}	7^{7}
Daniil Sarksian	3	6	3
WC	(United Kingdom) Luke Hooper	6	3	6
Q	(Brazil) Gustavo Ribero de Almeida	6^{5}	3
13	(Kazakhstan) Amir Omarkhanov	7^{7}	6
9	(South Korea) Kim Jang-jun	6	6
(United States) Jack Kennedy	3	1
(Germany) Max Schönhaus	4	6	3
(United Kingdom) Charlie Robertson	6	2	6
(Netherlands) Mees Röttgering	6	7
(Cyprus) Andreas Timini	4	5
(United States) Trevor Svajda	6^{8}	6	3
7	(Australia) Hayden Jones	7^{10}	1	6

Second round
1	(United States) K Bigun	6	6
(France) T Faurel	3	4
WC	(United Kingdom) L Hooper	4	7	3
13	(Kazakhstan) A Omarkhanov	6	5	6
9	(South Korea) J-j Kim	6	6^{3}	3
(United Kingdom) C Robertson	4	7^{7}	6
(Netherlands) M Röttgering	6	3	6
7	(Australia) H Jones	4	6	4

Third round
1	(United States) K Bigun	6^{4}	6	6
13	(Kazakhstan) A Omarkhanov	7^{7}	0	4
(United Kingdom) C Robertson	6^{5}	2
(Netherlands) M Röttgering	7^{7}	6

Quarterfinals
1	(United States) K Bigun	6^{3}	3
(Netherlands) M Röttgering	7^{7}	6

==== Section 2 ====
First round
3	(Italy) Federico Cinà	6	6
Q	(United Kingdom) Zechariah Hamrouni	2	2
Q	(United States) Kase Schinnerer	7	6
WC	(United Kingdom) Jamie Diack	5	3
(Sweden) William Rejchtman Vinciguerra	5	7^{8}	6
(United States) Ian Mayew	7	6^{6}	3
(United Kingdom) Benjamin Gusic Wan	1	1
16	(France) Théo Papamalamis	6	6
12	(Serbia) Marko Maksimović	2	5
WC	(United Kingdom) Charlie Swaine	6	7
Timofei Derepasko	4	4
Q	(Switzerland) Flynn Thomas	6	6
(United States) Jagger Leach	7^{7}	7
(Spain) Izan Almazán Valiente	6^{2}	5
Q	(Bulgaria) Alexander Vasilev	6	6^{1}	6^{7}
6	(Czech Republic) Jan Kumstát	4	7^{7}	7^{9}

Second round
3	(Italy) F Cinà	7^{9}	4	6
Q	(United States) K Schinnerer	6^{7}	6	2
(Sweden) W Rejchtman Vinciguerra	2	3
16	(France) T Papamalamis	6	6
WC	(United Kingdom) C Swaine	2	5
Q	(Switzerland) F Thomas	6	7
(United States) J Leach	6	7^{8}
6	(Czech Republic) J Kumstát	4	6^{6}

Third round
3	(Italy) F Cinà	2	6	3
16	(France) T Papamalamis	6	0	6
Q	(Switzerland) F Thomas	3	2
(United States) J Leach	6	6

Quarterfinals
16	(France) T Papamalamis	6	6
(United States) J Leach	3	3

=== Bottom half ===
==== Section 3 ====
First round
8	(Czech Republic) Petr Brunclík	6	6
WC	(United Kingdom) Henry Jefferson	3	3
(Switzerland) Henry Bernet	6	6
(Italy) Andrea De Marchi	3	4
(United States) Matthew Forbes	6	6
WC	(United Kingdom) Conor Brady	4	1
(Japan) Naoya Honda	3	6	6
11	(Colombia) Miguel Tobón	6	2	1
14	(Morocco) Reda Bennani	6	6^{4}	7^{8}
(United Kingdom) Oliver Bonding	4	7^{7}	6^{6}
Q	(South Korea) Hwang Dong-hyun	4	6	2
(Spain) Rafael Jódar	6	1	6
(United States) Alexander Razeghi	3	4
(France) Nathan Trouvé	6	6
(Australia) Pavle Marinkov	6^{4}	2
4	(Poland) Tomasz Berkieta	7^{7}	6

Second round
8	(Czech Republic) P Brunclík	6^{4}	5
(Switzerland) H Bernet	7^{7}	7
(United States) M Forbes	4	6	4
(Japan) N Honda	6	3	6
14	(Morocco) R Bennani	1	6	3
(Spain) R Jódar	6	3	6
(France) N Trouvé	3	4
4	(Poland) T Berkieta	6	6

Third round
(Switzerland) H Bernet	2	6	1
(Japan) N Honda	6	3	6
(Spain) R Jódar	6	6
4	(Poland) T Berkieta	0	3

Quarterfinals
(Japan) N Honda	6	6
(Spain) R Jódar	4	4

==== Section 4 ====
First round
5	(Romania) Luca Preda	6^{2}	4
WC	(United Kingdom) Mark Ceban	7^{7}	6
(South Korea) Roh Ho-young	6	6
(United States) Maxwell Exsted	3	2
Q	(United Kingdom) Kai-Luca Ampaw	3	6	2
(Spain) Andrés Santamarta Roig	6	4	6
(United Kingdom) Viktor Frydrych	6	2	2
10	(Czech Republic) Maxim Mrva	1	6	6
15	(United States) Cooper Woestendick	6	6
Q	(Germany) Tom Sickenberger	3	2
(Turkey) Atakan Karahan	6^{4}	4
(Italy) Daniele Rapagnetta	7^{7}	6
WC	(United Kingdom) Zach Stephens	3	1
(China) Zhang Tianhui	6	6
(France) Maé Malige	3	6	2
2	(Norway) Nicolai Budkov Kjær	6	4	6

Second round
WC	(United Kingdom) M Ceban	6	3	7^{10}
(South Korea) H-y Roh	2	6	6^{6}
(Spain) A Santamarta Roig	4	2
10	(Czech Republic) M Mrva	6	6
15	(United States) C Woestendick	4	6	6
(Italy) D Rapagnetta	6	3	3
(China) T Zhang	2	3
2	(Norway) N Budkov Kjær	6	6

Third round
WC	(United Kingdom) M Ceban	7	4	2
10	(Czech Republic) M Mrva	5	6	6
15	(United States) C Woestendick	1	4
2	(Norway) N Budkov Kjær	6	6

Quarterfinals
10	(Czech Republic) M Mrva	6^{2}	4
2	(Norway) N Budkov Kjær	7^{7}	6

== Qualifying ==
=== Seeds ===
1. (Finland) Oskari Paldanius (first round)
2. (United States) Noah Johnston (first round)
3. (Bulgaria) Alexander Vasilev (qualified)
4. (United States) Kase Schinnerer (qualified)
5. (Brazil) Gustavo Ribeiro de Almeida (qualified)
6. (South Korea) Hwang Dong-hyun (qualified)
7. (Italy) Lorenzo Beraldo (first round)
8. (Bulgaria) Anas Mazdrashki (qualifying competition, retired)
9. (Italy) Lorenzo Angelini (qualifying competition)
10. (Czech Republic) Jan Klimas (qualifying competition)
11. (Brazil) Enzo Kohlmann de Freitas (qualifying competition)
12. (France) Felix Balshaw (first round)
13. (Czech Republic) Denis Peták (first round)
14. (Tunisia) Alaa Trifi (first round)
15. (Switzerland) Flynn Thomas (qualified)
16. (Spain) Carles Córdoba (qualifying competition)

=== Qualifiers ===
1. (United Kingdom) Kai-Luca Ampaw
2. (Germany) Tom Sickenberger
3. (Bulgaria) Alexander Vasilev
4. (United States) Kase Schinnerer
5. (Brazil) Gustavo Ribeiro de Almeida
6. (South Korea) Hwang Dong-hyun
7. (Switzerland) Flynn Thomas
8. (United Kingdom) Zechariah Hamrouni

=== Qualifying draw ===
==== First qualifier ====
First round
1	(Finland) Oskari Paldanius	2	6	[5]
WC	(United Kingdom) Kai-Luca Ampaw	6	3	[10]
(Kazakhstan) Danial Rakhmatullayev	3	6^{1}
11	(Brazil) Enzo Kohlmann de Freitas	6	7^{7}

Qualifying competition
WC	(United Kingdom) Kai-Luca Ampaw	7	6
11	(Brazil) Enzo Kohlmann de Freitas	5	3

==== Second qualifier ====
First round
2	(United States) Noah Johnston	6	6^{3}	[8]
(Germany) Tom Sickenberger	4	7^{7}	[10]
WC	(United Kingdom) Liam Channon	2	2
10	(Czech Republic) Jan Klimas	6	6

Qualifying competition
(Germany) Tom Sickenberger	6	6
10	(Czech Republic) Jan Klimas	3	4

==== Third qualifier ====
First round
3	(Bulgaria) Alexander Vasilev	6	6
WC	(United Kingdom) Alfie King	1	4
(United States) Stiles Brockett	2	2
9	(Italy) Lorenzo Angelini	6	6

Qualifying competition
3	(Bulgaria) Alexander Vasilev	6	6
9	(Italy) Lorenzo Angelini	4	3

==== Fourth qualifier ====
First round
4	(United States) Kase Schinnerer	6	6
WC	(United Kingdom) Rhys Lawlor	4	2
(Spain) Pablo Martínez Gómez	4	6	[10]
14	(Tunisia) Alaa Trifi	6	2	[7]

Qualifying competition
4	(United States) Kase Schinnerer	3	6	[10]
(Spain) Pablo Martínez Gómez	6	3	[6]

==== Fifth qualifier ====
First round
5	(Brazil) Gustavo Ribeiro de Almeida	3	6	[10]
(France) Moïse Kouamé	6	3	[4]
WC	(United Kingdom) Jay Johnson-Hauldren	7^{7}	5	[15]
16	(Spain) Carles Córdoba	6^{3}	7	[17]

Qualifying competition
5	(Brazil) Gustavo Ribeiro de Almeida	6	7
16	(Spain) Carles Córdoba	4	5

==== Sixth qualifier ====
First round
6	(South Korea) Hwang Dong-hyun	7^{7}	6
(Singapore) Bill Chan	6^{2}	1
(Australia) Hugh Winter	6	6
13	(Czech Republic) Denis Peták	3	1

Qualifying competition
6	(South Korea) Hwang Dong-hyun	6	6^{5}	[11]
(Australia) Hugh Winter	3	7^{7}	[9]

==== Seventh qualifier ====
First round
7	(Italy) Lorenzo Beraldo	3	6^{3}
(Romania) Ștefan Horia Haita	6	7^{7}
(Germany) Max Stenzer	3	3
15	(Switzerland) Flynn Thomas	6	6

Qualifying competition
(Romania) Ștefan Horia Haita	2	0
15	(Switzerland) Flynn Thomas	6	6

==== Eighth qualifier ====
First round
8	(Bulgaria) Anas Mazdrashki	6^{4}	7^{7}	[10]
(Nicaragua) Joaquín Guilleme	7^{7}	6^{1}	[7]
WC	(United Kingdom) Zechariah Hamrouni	6	1	[10]
12	(France) Felix Balshaw	1	6	[7]

Qualifying competition
8	(Bulgaria) Anas Mazdrashki	6^{2}	1^{r}
WC	(United Kingdom) Zechariah Hamrouni	7^{7}	4
