= 2024 Wimbledon Championships – Gentlemen's invitation doubles =

Gentlemen's invitation doubles
- 2024 Wimbledon Championships

Final
- Champions: (United States) Bob Bryan (United States) Mike Bryan
- Runners-up: (South Africa) Kevin Anderson (Australia) Lleyton Hewitt
- Score: 6–1, 6–4

Events
Singles	men	women		boys	girls
Doubles	men	women	mixed	boys	girls
WC Singles	men	women	quad
WC Doubles	men	women	quad
14&U Singles	boys	girls
Legends	men	women	mixed
- Wimbledon Championships

Bob and Mike Bryan, the two-time defending champions, successfully defended their title by defeating Kevin Anderson and Lleyton Hewitt in the final, 6–1, 6–4.

== Draw ==
=== Final ===
Final
A4	(South Africa) Kevin Anderson (Australia) Lleyton Hewitt	1	4
B1	(United States) Bob Bryan (United States) Mike Bryan	6	6

=== Group A ===
		(Colombia) Cabal (Colombia) Farah	(United Kingdom) Delgado (France) Grosjean	(Germany) Haas (Australia) Philippoussis	(South Africa) Anderson (Australia) Hewitt	RR; W–L	Set; W–L	Game; W–L	Standings
A1	(Colombia) Juan Sebastián Cabal (Colombia) Robert Farah		7–5, 6–3	2–6, 6–3, [11–9]	6–4, 5–7, [3–10]	2–1	5–3	33–29	2
A2	(United Kingdom) Jamie Delgado (France) Sébastien Grosjean	5–7, 3–6		3–3, ret.	3–6, 2–6	1–2	1–4	16–28	3
A3	(Germany) Tommy Haas (Australia) Mark Philippoussis	6–2, 3–6, [9–11]	3–3, ret.		7–6^{(7–3)}, 4–6, [10–12]	0–3	2–5	23–25	4
A4	(South Africa) Kevin Anderson (Australia) Lleyton Hewitt	4–6, 7–5, [10–3]	6–3, 6–2	6–7^{(3–7)}, 6–4, [12–10]		3–0	6–2	37–27	1

=== Group B ===
		(United States) Bryan (United States) Bryan	(Cyprus) Baghdatis (Belgium) Malisse	(United States) Blake (Brazil) Soares	(France) Chardy (Spain) López	RR; W–L	Set; W–L	Game; W–L	Standings
B1	(United States) Bob Bryan (United States) Mike Bryan		6–3, 6–3	7–5, 6–3	6–4, 6–4	3–0	6–0	37–22	1
B2	(Cyprus) Marcos Baghdatis (Belgium) Xavier Malisse	3–6, 3–6		6–7^{(5–7)}, 3–6	7–6^{(7–5)}, 6–3	1–2	2–4	28–34	3
B3	(United States) James Blake (Brazil) Bruno Soares	5–7, 3–6	7–6^{(7–5)}, 6–3		6–4, 4–6, [10–1]	2–1	4–3	32–32	2
B4	(France) Jérémy Chardy (Spain) Feliciano López	4–6, 4–6	6–7^{(5–7)}, 3–6	4–6, 6–4, [1–10]		0–3	1–6	27–36	4
