= Max Schönhaus =

German tennis player (born 2007)

- Full name: Max Schönhaus
- ITF name: Max Schoenhaus
- Country (sports): Germany
- Born: 1 August 2007 (age 19) Soest, Germany
- Height: 1.80 m (5 ft 11 in)
- Plays: Right-handed (one-handed backhand)
- Prize money: US $115,446

Singles
- Career record: 0–2 (at ATP Tour level, Grand Slam level, and in Davis Cup)
- Career titles: 0
- Highest ranking: No. 287 (21 September 2026)
- Current ranking: No. 287 (21 September 2026)

Doubles
- Career record: 0–1 (at ATP Tour level, Grand Slam level, and in Davis Cup)
- Career titles: 0
- Highest ranking: No. 614 (8 June 2026)
- Current ranking: No. 745 (21 September 2026)
- Last updated on: 21 September 2026.

Max Schönhaus (born 1 August 2007) is a German tennis player. He has a career-high ATP singles ranking of No. 287 achieved on 21 September 2026 and a best doubles ranking of No. 614 achieved on 8 June 2026.

Schönhaus won the Junior doubles title at the 2024 Wimbledon Championships.

== Early life ==
Schönhaus is from Niederense in Ense. He trained at the TNB-TennisBase Hannover.

== Junior career ==
In 2021, Schönhaus won the European U14 Masters tournament in Monte Carlo, defeating compatriot Justin Engel.

Alongside Alexander Razeghi, he reached the semifinals of the boys' doubles at the 2024 French Open. Subsequently, the pair lifted a Grand Slam Junior title at the 2024 Wimbledon Championships, defeating top-seeded pair Federico Cinà and Maxim Mrva in the semifinal, and Czechs Jan Kumstát and Jan Klimas in the final. Schönhaus reached the final of the boys' singles at the 2025 French Open, where he was beaten in three sets by compatriot Niels McDonald for the title. Later that season, he was a semifinalist at the 2025 Wimbledon Championships, where he lost to eventual champion, Bulgarian Ivan Ivanov, in two tiebreaks.

He had good results on ITF junior circuit, maintaining a 102–52 singles win-loss record and he reached and ITF junior combined ranking of world No. 2 on 27 October 2025.

== Professional career ==
Schönhaus made his ATP Tour main draw debut at the 2025 Halle Open in the doubles competition, partnering Jan-Lennard Struff.

== ITF World Tennis Tour finals ==
=== Singles: 5 (3 titles, 2 runner-ups) ===
Finals by surface
Hard (2–1)
Clay (1–1)

Result	W–L	Date	Tournament	Surface	Opponent	Score
Win	1–0	Oct 2025	M15 Monastir, Tunisia	Hard	(France) Yanis Ghazouani Durand	7–6^{(7–0)}, 6–3
Win	2–0	Nov 2025	M25 Monastir, Tunisia	Hard	(Czech Republic) Matthew William Donald	7–6^{(8–6)}, 7–6^{(7–4)}
Loss	2–1	Nov 2025	M15 Monastir, Tunisia	Hard	(Kazakhstan) Amir Omarkhanov	3–6, 6–3, 4–6
Loss	2–2	Apr 2026	M25 Santa Margherita di Pula, Italy	Clay	(France) Florent Bax	6–4, 4–6, 2–6
Win	3–2	May 2026	M25 Troisdorf, Germany	Clay	(Germany) Mika Petkovic	6–4, 6–3

=== Doubles: 3 (2 titles, 1 runner-up) ===
Finals by surface
Hard (1–1)
Clay (1–0)

Result	W–L	Date	Tournament	Surface	Partner	Opponents	Score
Win	1–0	Sep 2025	M15 Monastir, Tunisia	Hard	(Germany) Nikolai Barsukov	(Lithuania) Ainius Sabaliauskas (Italy) Samuele Seghetti	7–6^{(9–7)}, 3–6, [10–3]
Loss	1–1	Nov 2025	M15 Monastir, Tunisia	Hard	(Germany) Mika Petkovic	(Turkey) S Mert Özdemir (Turkey) Mert Naci Türker	6–7^{(8–10)}, 6–7^{(4–7)}
Win	2–1	May 2026	M25 Troisdorf, Germany	Clay	(Germany) Kai Wehnelt	(Germany) Christoph Negritu (Germany) Adrian Oetzbach	6–3, 6–4

== Junior Grand Slam finals ==
=== Singles: 1 (runner-up) ===
Result	Year	Tournament	Surface	Opponent	Score
Loss	2025	French Open	Clay	(Germany) Niels McDonald	7–6^{(7–5)}, 0–6, 3–6

=== Doubles: 1 (title) ===
Result	Year	Tournament	Surface	Partner	Opponents	Score
Win	2024	Wimbledon	Grass	(United States) Alexander Razeghi	(Czech Republic) Jan Klimas (Czech Republic) Jan Kumstát	7–6^{(7–1)}, 6–4
