= 2024 Wimbledon Championships – Wheelchair quad singles =

Tennis championship

Wheelchair quad singles
- 2024 Wimbledon Championships

Final
- Champion: (Netherlands) Niels Vink
- Runner-up: (Netherlands) Sam Schröder
- Score: 7–6^{(7–4)}, 6–4

Details
- Draw: 8
- Seeds: 2

Events
Singles	men	women		boys	girls
Doubles	men	women	mixed	boys	girls
WC Singles	men	women	quad
WC Doubles	men	women	quad
Legends	men	women	mixed
14&U Singles	boys	girls
← 2023 ·	Wimbledon Championships	· 2025 →

Defending champion Niels Vink defeated Sam Schröder in the final, 7–6^{(7–4)}, 6–4 to win the quad singles wheelchair tennis title at the 2024 Wimbledon Championships.

== Seeds ==
1. (Netherlands) Sam Schröder (final)
2. (Netherlands) Niels Vink (champion)

== Draw ==
=== Key ===
- Q = Qualifier
- WC = Wild card
- LL = Lucky loser
- Alt = Alternate
- SE = Special exempt
- PR = Protected ranking
- ITF = ITF entry
- JE = Junior exempt
- w/o = Walkover
- r = Retired
- d = Defaulted
- SR = Special ranking

=== Finals ===
Quarterfinals
1	(Netherlands) Sam Schröder	6	6
(Turkey) Ahmet Kaplan	3	2
(United States) David Wagner	2	4
(United Kingdom) Andy Lapthorne	6	6
(Israel) Guy Sasson	6	6
(South Africa) Donald Ramphadi	0	1
(Australia) Heath Davidson	3	3
2	(Netherlands) Niels Vink	6	6

Semifinals
1	(Netherlands) Sam Schröder	6	6
(United Kingdom) Andy Lapthorne	1	0
(Israel) Guy Sasson	5	5
2	(Netherlands) Niels Vink	7	7

Final
1	(Netherlands) Sam Schröder	6^{4}	4
2	(Netherlands) Niels Vink	7^{7}	6

== Sources ==
- Draw
