= 2024 Wimbledon Championships – Wheelchair men's doubles =

Tennis championship

Wheelchair men's doubles
- 2024 Wimbledon Championships

Final
- Champions: (United Kingdom) Alfie Hewett (United Kingdom) Gordon Reid
- Runners-up: (Japan) Takuya Miki (Japan) Tokito Oda
- Score: 6–4, 7–6^{(7–2)}

Details
- Draw: 8
- Seeds: 2

Events
Singles	men	women		boys	girls
Doubles	men	women	mixed	boys	girls
WC Singles	men	women	quad
WC Doubles	men	women	quad
Legends	men	women	mixed
14&U Singles	boys	girls
← 2023 ·	Wimbledon Championships	· 2025 →

Defending champions Alfie Hewett and Gordon Reid defeated Takuya Miki and Tokito Oda in the final, 6–4, 7–6^{(7–2)} to win the gentlemen's doubles wheelchair tennis title at the 2024 Wimbledon Championships.

== Seeds ==
1. (United Kingdom) Alfie Hewett / (United Kingdom) Gordon Reid (champions)
2. (Japan) Takuya Miki / (Japan) Tokito Oda (final)

== Draw ==
=== Key ===
- Q = Qualifier
- WC = Wild card
- LL = Lucky loser
- Alt = Alternate
- ITF = ITF entry
- PR = Protected ranking
- SR = Special ranking
- SE = Special exempt
- JE = Junior exempt
- JR = Junior Accelerator Programme entrant
- CO = College Accelerator Programme entrant
- NG = Next Gen Accelerator Program entrant
- w/o = Walkover
- r = Retired
- d = Defaulted

=== Finals ===
Quarterfinals
1	(United Kingdom) Alfie Hewett (United Kingdom) Gordon Reid	6	7
(Spain) Martín de la Puente (Belgium) Joachim Gérard	1	5
(Netherlands) Tom Egberink (Netherlands) Maikel Scheffers	6	7^{7}
(France) Stéphane Houdet (Japan) Takashi Sanada	4	6^{5}
(United Kingdom) Ben Bartram (Spain) Daniel Caverzaschi	5	6	6
(Chile) Alexander Cataldo (Argentina) Gustavo Fernández	7	4	4
(United States) Casey Ratzlaff (Netherlands) Ruben Spaargaren	6	4	1
2	(Japan) Takuya Miki (Japan) Tokito Oda	4	6	6

Semifinals
1	(United Kingdom) Alfie Hewett (United Kingdom) Gordon Reid	6	7^{14}
(Netherlands) Tom Egberink (Netherlands) Maikel Scheffers	1	6^{12}
(United Kingdom) Ben Bartram (Spain) Daniel Caverzaschi	4	1
2	(Japan) Takuya Miki (Japan) Tokito Oda	6	6

Final
1	(United Kingdom) Alfie Hewett (United Kingdom) Gordon Reid	6	7^{7}
2	(Japan) Takuya Miki (Japan) Tokito Oda	4	6^{2}

== Sources ==
- Draw
