= 2024 Wimbledon Championships – Ladies' invitation doubles =

Ladies' invitation doubles
- 2024 Wimbledon Championships

Final
- Champions: (Belgium) Kim Clijsters (Switzerland) Martina Hingis
- Runners-up: (Australia) Ashleigh Barty (Australia) Casey Dellacqua
- Score: 6–3, 6–2

Events
Singles	men	women		boys	girls
Doubles	men	women	mixed	boys	girls
WC Singles	men	women	quad
WC Doubles	men	women	quad
Legends	men	women	mixed
14&U Singles	boys	girls
← 2023 ·	Wimbledon Championships	· 2025 →

Two-time defending champions Kim Clijsters and Martina Hingis successfully defended their title, defeating Ashleigh Barty and Casey Dellacqua in the final, 6–3, 6–2 to win the ladies' invitation doubles tennis title at the 2024 Wimbledon Championships.

== Draw ==
=== Final ===
Final
A1	(Belgium) Kim Clijsters (Switzerland) Martina Hingis	6	6
B1	(Australia) Ashleigh Barty (Australia) Casey Dellacqua	3	2

=== Group A ===
		(Belgium) Clijsters (Switzerland) Hingis	(Slovakia) Hantuchová (United Kingdom) Robson	(Poland) Radwańska (Italy) Schiavone	(Zimbabwe) Black (Australia) Stosur	RR; W–L	Set; W–L	Game; W–L	Standings
A1	(Belgium) Kim Clijsters (Switzerland) Martina Hingis		6–1, 6–3	6–3, 6–2	7–5, 7–5	3–0	6–0	38–19	1
A2	(Slovakia) Daniela Hantuchová (United Kingdom) Laura Robson	1–6, 3–6		6–7^{(7–9)}, 2–6	5–7, 5–7	0–3	0–6	22–39	4
A3	(Poland) Agnieszka Radwańska (Italy) Francesca Schiavone	3–6, 2–6	7–6^{(9–7)}, 6–2		6–7^{(5–7)}, 2–6	1–2	2–4	26–33	3
A4	(Zimbabwe) Cara Black (Australia) Samantha Stosur	5–7, 5–7	7–5, 7–5	7–6^{(7–5)}, 6–2		2–1	4–2	37–32	2

=== Group B ===
		(Australia) Barty (Australia) Dellacqua	(Germany) Petkovic (Slovakia) Rybáriková	(United Kingdom) Konta (United States) Vandeweghe	(Italy) Vinci (China) Zheng	RR; W–L	Set; W–L	Game; W–L	Standings
B1	(Australia) Ashleigh Barty (Australia) Casey Dellacqua		5–7, 6–3, [10–7]	6–4, 6–2	6–2, 6–4	3–0	6–1	36–22	1
B2	(Germany) Andrea Petkovic (Slovakia) Magdaléna Rybáriková	7–5, 3–6, [7–10]		6–3, 6–4	7–6^{(7–3)}, 2–6, [10–12]	1–2	4–4	31–32	3
B3	(United Kingdom) Johanna Konta (United States) CoCo Vandeweghe	2–4, 2–6	3–6, 4–6		4–6, 4–6	0–3	0–6	21–36	4
B4	(Italy) Roberta Vinci (China) Zheng Jie	2–6, 4–6	6–7^{(3–7)}, 6–2, [12–10]	6–4, 6–4		2–1	4–3	31–29	2
