= 2024 Wimbledon Championships – Mixed doubles =

Mixed doubles
- 2024 Wimbledon Championships

Final
- Champions: (Poland) Jan Zieliński (Chinese Taipei) Hsieh Su-wei
- Runners-up: (Mexico) Santiago González (Mexico) Giuliana Olmos
- Score: 6–4, 6–2

Details
- Draw: 32
- Seeds: 8

Events
Singles	men	women		boys	girls
Doubles	men	women	mixed	boys	girls
WC Singles	men	women	quad
WC Doubles	men	women	quad
Legends	men	women	mixed
14&U Singles	boys	girls
- Wimbledon Championships

Jan Zieliński and Hsieh Su-wei defeated Santiago González and Giuliana Olmos in the final, 6–4, 6–2 to win the mixed doubles tennis title at the 2024 Wimbledon Championships. González and Olmos were the first Mexican team to reach the final, and Olmos was the first female Mexican finalist in the Open Era.

Mate Pavić and Lyudmyla Kichenok were the defending champions, but they withdrew from their second-round match.

Bethanie Mattek-Sands was vying for a career Grand Slam and Golden Slam, but lost in the first round to Máximo González and Ulrikke Eikeri.

Because of the weather during the first week, the final had to be delayed until Sunday, and the tournament was played with a super tie-break in lieu of a final set. The two sets were still played with ad-scoring.

== Seeds ==
1. (Australia) Matthew Ebden / (Australia) Ellen Perez (first round)
2. (New Zealand) Michael Venus / (New Zealand) Erin Routliffe (semifinals)
3. (Croatia) Mate Pavić / (Ukraine) Lyudmyla Kichenok (second round, withdrew)
4. (United States) Austin Krajicek / (Germany) Laura Siegemund (first round)
5. (Italy) Andrea Vavassori / (Italy) Sara Errani (first round)
6. (United Kingdom) Neal Skupski / (United States) Desirae Krawczyk (quarterfinals)
7. (Poland) Jan Zieliński / (Chinese Taipei) Hsieh Su-wei (champions)
8. (Croatia) Ivan Dodig / (Chinese Taipei) Chan Hao-ching (first round)

== Draw ==
Key

- Q = Qualifier
- WC = Wild card
- LL = Lucky loser
- Alt = Alternate
- ITF = ITF entry
- PR = Protected ranking
- SR = Special ranking
- SE = Special exempt
- JE = Junior exempt
- JR = Junior Accelerator Programme entrant
- CO = College Accelerator Programme entrant
- NG = Next Gen Accelerator Program entrant
- w/o = Walkover
- r = Retired
- d = Defaulted

=== Finals ===
Semifinals
(Mexico) Santiago González (Mexico) Giuliana Olmos	6	7^{7}
(Argentina) Máximo González (Norway) Ulrikke Eikeri	3	6^{5}
7	(Poland) Jan Zieliński (Chinese Taipei) Hsieh Su-wei	7^{7}	6
2	(New Zealand) Michael Venus (New Zealand) Erin Routliffe	6^{0}	3

Final
(Mexico) Santiago González (Mexico) Giuliana Olmos	4	2
7	(Poland) Jan Zieliński (Chinese Taipei) Hsieh Su-wei	6	6

=== Top half ===
First round
1	(Australia) M Ebden (Australia) E Perez	3	7^{7}	[9]
(Argentina) A Molteni (United States) A Muhammad	6	6^{5}	[11]
(Mexico) S González (Mexico) G Olmos	6	6
WC	(United Kingdom) L Johnson (United Kingdom) F Christie	4	0
PR	(El Salvador) M Arévalo (China) S Zhang	6	4	[10]
Alt	(United States) R Ram (United States) K Volynets	2	6	[12]
WC	(United Kingdom) M Willis (United Kingdom) A Barnett	6	3	[10]
8	(Croatia) I Dodig (Chinese Taipei) H-c Chan	3	6	[5]
3	(Croatia) M Pavić (Ukraine) L Kichenok	6	7^{7}
Alt	(United Kingdom) C Broom (United Kingdom) E Appleton	4	6^{3}
(Argentina) M González (Norway) U Eikeri	6	6
(Netherlands) J-J Rojer (United States) B Mattek-Sands	3	1
(United States) N Lammons (Japan) E Shibahara	6	6
(Australia) M Purcell (Ukraine) D Yastremska	1	2
(United States) J Withrow (Indonesia) A Sutjiadi	6	3	[10]
5	(Italy) A Vavassori (Italy) S Errani	3	6	[8]

Second round
(Argentina) A Molteni (United States) A Muhammad	6^{5}	6	[8]
(Mexico) S González (Mexico) G Olmos	7^{7}	4	[10]
Alt	(United States) R Ram (United States) K Volynets	6	3	[9]
WC	(United Kingdom) M Willis (United Kingdom) A Barnett	2	6	[11]
3	(Croatia) M Pavić (Ukraine) L Kichenok
(Argentina) M González (Norway) U Eikeri	w/o
(United States) N Lammons (Japan) E Shibahara	7^{7}	6
(United States) J Withrow (Indonesia) A Sutjiadi	6^{5}	4

Quarterfinals
(Mexico) S González (Mexico) G Olmos	6	7
WC	(United Kingdom) M Willis (United Kingdom) A Barnett	3	5
(Argentina) M González (Norway) U Eikeri	6	3	[11]
(United States) N Lammons (Japan) E Shibahara	4	6	[9]

Semifinals
(Mexico) S González (Mexico) G Olmos	6	7^{7}
(Argentina) M González (Norway) U Eikeri	3	6^{5}

=== Bottom half ===
First round
7	(Poland) J Zieliński (Chinese Taipei) S-w Hsieh	6	7^{7}
(Monaco) H Nys (Netherlands) D Schuurs	3	6^{4}
(United Kingdom) J Salisbury (United Kingdom) H Watson	5	6	[10]
(Belgium) S Gillé (Ukraine) N Kichenok	7	3	[8]
Alt	(Colombia) N Barrientos (Japan) M Kato	3	6^{5}
(United Kingdom) J Murray (United States) T Townsend	6	7^{7}
(Germany) K Krawietz; A Panova	7	6
4	(United States) A Krajicek (Germany) L Siegemund	5	4
6	(United Kingdom) N Skupski (United States) D Krawczyk	6	6^{4}	[11]
(Brazil) R Matos (Brazil) L Stefani	4	7^{7}	[9]
WC	(United Kingdom) L Glasspool (United Kingdom) H Dart	3	6^{5}
PR	(France) F Martin (Spain) C Bucșa	6	7^{7}
WC	(United Kingdom) J Cash (United Kingdom) M Lumsden	5	6^{5}
WC	(United Kingdom) H Patten (United Kingdom) O Nicholls	7	7^{7}
(Finland) H Heliövaara (Canada) G Dabrowski	4	4
2	(New Zealand) M Venus (New Zealand) E Routliffe	6	6

Second round
7	(Poland) J Zieliński (Chinese Taipei) S-w Hsieh	7^{7}	6
(United Kingdom) J Salisbury (United Kingdom) H Watson	6^{4}	4
(United Kingdom) J Murray (United States) T Townsend	6^{3}	6	[10]
(Germany) K Krawietz; A Panova	7^{7}	1	[5]
6	(United Kingdom) N Skupski (United States) D Krawczyk	6	6
PR	(France) F Martin (Spain) C Bucșa	3	3
WC	(United Kingdom) H Patten (United Kingdom) O Nicholls	7	5	[9]
2	(New Zealand) M Venus (New Zealand) E Routliffe	5	7	[11]

Quarterfinals
7	(Poland) J Zieliński (Chinese Taipei) S-w Hsieh	7^{7}	6^{7}	[10]
(United Kingdom) J Murray (United States) T Townsend	6^{2}	7^{9}	[5]
6	(United Kingdom) N Skupski (United States) D Krawczyk	5	4
2	(New Zealand) M Venus (New Zealand) E Routliffe	7	6

Semifinals
7	(Poland) J Zieliński (Chinese Taipei) S-w Hsieh	7^{7}	6
2	(New Zealand) M Venus (New Zealand) E Routliffe	6^{0}	3

== Other entry information ==
=== Wildcards ===
- (United Kingdom) Julian Cash / (United Kingdom) Maia Lumsden
- (United Kingdom) Lloyd Glasspool / (United Kingdom) Harriet Dart
- (United Kingdom) Luke Johnson / (United Kingdom) Freya Christie
- ~~(United Kingdom) Andy Murray / (United Kingdom) Emma Raducanu~~
- (United Kingdom) Henry Patten / (United Kingdom) Olivia Nicholls
- (United Kingdom) Marcus Willis / (United Kingdom) Alicia Barnett

=== Protected ranking ===
- (El Salvador) Marcelo Arévalo / (China) Zhang Shuai
- (France) Fabrice Martin / (Spain) Cristina Bucșa

=== Alternates ===
- (Colombia) Nicolás Barrientos / (Japan) Miyu Kato
- (United Kingdom) Charles Broom / (United Kingdom) Emily Appleton
- (United States) Rajeev Ram / (United States) Katie Volynets

=== Withdrawals ===
- (United States) Robert Galloway / (Estonia) Ingrid Neel → replaced by (Colombia) Nicolás Barrientos / (Japan) Miyu Kato
- (United Kingdom) Andy Murray / (United Kingdom) Emma Raducanu → replaced by (United States) Rajeev Ram / (United States) Katie Volynets
- (Australia) John Peers / (United States) Nicole Melichar-Martinez → replaced by (United Kingdom) Charles Broom / (United Kingdom) Emily Appleton
