= 2024 Wimbledon Championships – Wheelchair quad doubles =

Wheelchair quad doubles
- 2024 Wimbledon Championships

Final
- Champions: (Netherlands) Sam Schröder (Netherlands) Niels Vink
- Runners-up: (United Kingdom) Andy Lapthorne (Israel) Guy Sasson
- Score: 3–6, 7–6^{(7–3)}, 6–3

Details
- Draw: 4
- Seeds: 2

Events
Singles	men	women		boys	girls
Doubles	men	women	mixed	boys	girls
WC Singles	men	women	quad
WC Doubles	men	women	quad
Legends	men	women	mixed
14&U Singles	boys	girls
← 2023 ·	Wimbledon Championships	· 2025 →

Two-time defending champions Sam Schröder and Niels Vink defeated Andy Lapthorne and Guy Sasson in the final, 3–6, 7–6^{(7–3)}, 6–3 to win the quad doubles wheelchair tennis title at the 2024 Wimbledon Championships.

== Seeds ==
1. (Netherlands) Sam Schröder / (Netherlands) Niels Vink (champions)
2. (United Kingdom) Andy Lapthorne / (Israel) Guy Sasson (final)

== Draw ==
=== Key ===
- Q = Qualifier
- WC = Wild card
- LL = Lucky loser
- Alt = Alternate
- SE = Special exempt
- PR = Protected ranking
- ITF = ITF entry
- JE = Junior exempt
- w/o = Walkover
- r = Retired
- d = Defaulted
- SR = Special ranking

=== Finals ===
Semifinals
1	(Netherlands) Sam Schröder (Netherlands) Niels Vink	6	6
(Australia) Heath Davidson (South Africa) Donald Ramphadi	2	2
(Turkey) Ahmet Kaplan (United States) David Wagner	2	4
2	(United Kingdom) Andy Lapthorne (Israel) Guy Sasson	6	6

Final
1	(Netherlands) Sam Schröder (Netherlands) Niels Vink	3	7^{7}	6
2	(United Kingdom) Andy Lapthorne (Israel) Guy Sasson	6	6^{3}	3

== Sources ==
- Draw
