= 2024 Wimbledon Championships – Wheelchair men's singles =

Tennis championship

Wheelchair men's singles
- 2024 Wimbledon Championships

Final
- Champion: (United Kingdom) Alfie Hewett
- Runner-up: (Spain) Martín de la Puente
- Score: 6–2, 6–3

Details
- Draw: 16
- Seeds: 4

Events
Singles	men	women		boys	girls
Doubles	men	women	mixed	boys	girls
WC Singles	men	women	quad
WC Doubles	men	women	quad
14&U Singles	boys	girls
Legends	men	women	mixed
- Wimbledon Championships

Alfie Hewett defeated Martín de la Puente in the final, 6–2, 6–3 to win the gentlemen's singles wheelchair tennis title at the 2024 Wimbledon Championships. It was his ninth major singles title, and Hewett completed the career Grand Slam, having been the runner-up the previous two years.

Tokito Oda was the defending champion, but lost in the semifinals to de la Puente.

== Seeds ==
1. (Japan) Tokito Oda (semifinals)
2. (United Kingdom) Alfie Hewett (champion)
3. (Argentina) Gustavo Fernández (semifinals)
4. (Spain) Martín de la Puente (final)

== Draw ==
Key

- Q = Qualifier
- WC = Wild card
- LL = Lucky loser
- Alt = Alternate
- ITF = ITF entry
- PR = Protected ranking
- SR = Special ranking
- SE = Special exempt
- JE = Junior exempt
- JR = Junior Accelerator Programme entrant
- CO = College Accelerator Programme entrant
- NG = Next Gen Accelerator Program entrant
- w/o = Walkover
- r = Retired
- d = Defaulted

=== Finals ===
First round
1	(Japan) Tokito Oda	6	6
(Japan) Takashi Sanada	2	3
(Belgium) Joachim Gérard	7	6
(Netherlands) Maikel Scheffers	5	0
4	(Spain) Martín de la Puente	6	4	6
(Netherlands) Ruben Spaargaren	2	6	3
(Spain) Daniel Caverzaschi	6	6
(Chile) Alexander Cataldo	0	1
(United States) Casey Ratzlaff	1	1
(Netherlands) Tom Egberink	6	6
(United Kingdom) Gordon Reid	4	4
3	(Argentina) Gustavo Fernández	6	6
(France) Stéphane Houdet	6	6
(Japan) Takuya Miki	1	1
WC	(United Kingdom) Ben Bartram	1	4
2	(United Kingdom) Alfie Hewett	6	6

Quarterfinals
1	(Japan) T Oda	6	6
(Belgium) J Gérard	3	3
4	(Spain) M de la Puente	6	6
(Spain) D Caverzaschi	0	1
(Netherlands) T Egberink	5	2
3	(Argentina) G Fernández	7	6
(France) S Houdet	1	4
2	(United Kingdom) A Hewett	6	6

Semifinals
1	(Japan) T Oda	6	3	3
4	(Spain) M de la Puente	1	6	6
3	(Argentina) G Fernández	6	4	5
2	(United Kingdom) A Hewett	4	6	7

Final
4	(Spain) M de la Puente	2	3
2	(United Kingdom) A Hewett	6	6

== Sources ==
- Draw
