= 2024 Wimbledon Championships – Wheelchair women's singles =

Tennis championship

Wheelchair women's singles
- 2024 Wimbledon Championships

Final
- Champion: (Netherlands) Diede de Groot
- Runner-up: (Netherlands) Aniek van Koot
- Score: 6–4, 6–4

Details
- Draw: 16
- Seeds: 4

Events
Singles	men	women		boys	girls
Doubles	men	women	mixed	boys	girls
WC Singles	men	women	quad
WC Doubles	men	women	quad
Legends	men	women	mixed
14&U Singles	boys	girls
← 2023 ·	Wimbledon Championships	· 2025 →

Three-time defending champion Diede de Groot defeated Aniek van Koot in the final, 6–4, 6–4 to win the ladies' singles wheelchair tennis title at the 2024 Wimbledon Championships. It was her 15th consecutive major title and record-extending 23rd overall.

== Seeds ==
1. (Netherlands) Diede de Groot (champion)
2. (Japan) Yui Kamiji (semifinals)
3. (Netherlands) Jiske Griffioen (quarterfinals)
4. (Netherlands) Aniek van Koot (final)

== Draw ==
=== Key ===
- Q = Qualifier
- WC = Wild card
- LL = Lucky loser
- Alt = Alternate
- ITF = ITF entry
- PR = Protected ranking
- SR = Special ranking
- SE = Special exempt
- JE = Junior exempt
- JR = Junior Accelerator Programme entrant
- CO = College Accelerator Programme entrant
- NG = Next Gen Accelerator Program entrant
- w/o = Walkover
- r = Retired
- d = Defaulted

=== Finals ===
First round
1	(Netherlands) Diede de Groot	6	6
(Japan) Momoko Ohtani	4	4
(Japan) Manami Tanaka	6	2	3
(United States) Dana Mathewson	3	6	6
3	(Netherlands) Jiske Griffioen	6	6
(China) Guo Luoyao	3	3
(China) Wang Ziying	6	6
(Argentina) María Florencia Moreno	1	2
(Colombia) Angélica Bernal	4	2
(China) Li Xiaohui	6	6
(Netherlands) Lizzy de Greef	1	1
4	(Netherlands) Aniek van Koot	6	6
(South Africa) Kgothatso Montjane	6	6
(United Kingdom) Lucy Shuker	2	0
(China) Zhu Zhenzhen	0	4
2	(Japan) Yui Kamiji	6	6

Quarterfinals
1	(Netherlands) D de Groot	6	7
(United States) D Mathewson	0	5
3	(Netherlands) J Griffioen	5	6	3
(China) Z Wang	7	2	6
(China) X Li	6	6^{4}	4
4	(Netherlands) A van Koot	2	7^{7}	6
(South Africa) K Montjane	7^{7}	2	1
2	(Japan) Y Kamiji	6^{4}	6	6

Semifinals
1	(Netherlands) D de Groot	6	6
(China) Z Wang	3	2
4	(Netherlands) A van Koot	5	6	7
2	(Japan) Y Kamiji	7	4	5

Final
1	(Netherlands) D de Groot	6	6
4	(Netherlands) A van Koot	4	4
