= 2024 Wimbledon Championships – Mixed invitation doubles =

Mixed invitation doubles
- 2024 Wimbledon Championships

Final
- Champions: (Australia) Mark Woodforde (Slovakia) Dominika Cibulková
- Runners-up: (Serbia) Nenad Zimonjić (Austria) Barbara Schett
- Score: 6–3, 6–2

Events
| Singles | men | women | | boys | girls |
| Doubles | men | women | mixed | boys | girls |
| WC Singles | men | women | quad |
| WC Doubles | men | women | quad |
| Legends | men | women | mixed |
| 14&U Singles | boys | girls |
| ← 2023 · | Wimbledon Championships | · 2025 → |

Mark Woodforde and Dominika Cibulková won the mixed invitation doubles at the 2024 Wimbledon Championships. They defeated Nenad Zimonjić and Barbara Schett in the final, 6–3, 6–2.

Zimonjić and Rennae Stubbs were the reigning champions but chose not to compete together. Stubbs partnered Todd Woodbridge, but the team was eliminated in the round robin stage.

== Draw ==
=== Final ===
| Final |
| A2 | (Australia) Mark Woodforde (Slovakia) Dominika Cibulková | 6 | 6 |
| B1 | (Serbia) Nenad Zimonjić (Austria) Barbara Schett | 3 | 2 |

=== Group A ===
| | | (United Kingdom) Rusedski (Croatia) Majoli | (Australia) Woodforde (Slovakia) Cibulková | (Netherlands) Krajicek (Spain) Martínez | (Iran) Bahrami (Australia) Molik | RR; W–L | Set; W–L | Game; W–L | Standings |
| A1 | (United Kingdom) Greg Rusedski (Croatia) Iva Majoli | | 3–6, 4–6 | 2–6, 5–7 | 3–6, 6–4, [10–7] | 1–2 | 2–5 | 24–35 | 3 |
| A2 | (Australia) Mark Woodforde (Slovakia) Dominika Cibulková | 6–3, 6–4 | | 7–5, 2–6, [10–6] | 7–6^{(7–2)}, 7–6^{(7–5)} | 3–0 | 6–1 | 36–30 | 1 |
| A3 | (Netherlands) Richard Krajicek (Spain) Conchita Martínez | 6–2, 7–5 | 5–7, 6–2, [6–10] | | 6–3, 7–5 | 2–1 | 5–2 | 37–25 | 2 |
| A4 | (Iran) Mansour Bahrami (Australia) Alicia Molik | 6–3, 4–6, [7–10] | 6–7^{(2–7)}, 6–7^{(5—7)} | 3–6, 5–7 | | 0–3 | 1–6 | 30–37 | 4 |

=== Group B ===
| | | (Serbia) Zimonjić (Austria) Schett | (Australia) Woodbridge (Australia) Stubbs | (Sweden) Enqvist (United States) Navratilova | (Sweden) Björkman (United Kingdom) Keothavong | RR; W–L | Set; W–L | Game; W–L | Standings |
| B1 | (Serbia) Nenad Zimonjić (Austria) Barbara Schett | | 6–3, 6–4 | 7–5, 6–3 | 6–4, 3–6, [10–5] | 3–0 | 6–1 | 35–25 | 1 |
| B2 | (Australia) Todd Woodbridge (Australia) Rennae Stubbs | 3–6, 4–6 | | 6–4, 7–5 | 3–6, 2–6 | 1–2 | 2–4 | 25–33 | 3 |
| B3 | (Sweden) Thomas Enqvist (United States) Martina Navratilova | 5–7, 3–6 | 4–6, 5–7 | | 6–7^{(5–7)}, 4–6 | 0–3 | 0–6 | 27–39 | 4 |
| B4 | (Sweden) Jonas Björkman (United Kingdom) Anne Keothavong | 4–6, 6–3, [5–10] | 6–3, 6–2 | 7–6^{(7–5)}, 6–4 | | 2–1 | 5–2 | 35–25 | 2 |
