= 2024 Wimbledon Championships – Girls' singles =

Girls' singles
- 2024 Wimbledon Championships

Final
- Champion: (Slovakia) Renáta Jamrichová
- Runner-up: (Australia) Emerson Jones
- Score: 6–3, 6–4

Events
| Singles | men | women | | boys | girls |
| Doubles | men | women | mixed | boys | girls |
| WC Singles | men | women | quad |
| WC Doubles | men | women | quad |
| 14&U Singles | boys | girls |
| Legends | men | women | mixed |
- Wimbledon Championships

Renáta Jamrichová won the title, defeating Emerson Jones 6–3, 6–4 in the final. It was her second junior Grand Slam singles title.

The final between Jamrichová and Jones was a rematch of their 2024 Australian Open girls' singles final, where Jamrichová won her first junior Grand Slam singles title.

Clervie Ngounoue was the defending champion, but chose not to participate in the junior event this year. She received a wildcard into the women's singles qualifying competition, where she lost to Simona Waltert in the first round.

== Seeds ==
1. (Slovakia) Renáta Jamrichová (champion)
2. (Czech Republic) Laura Samson (third round)
3. (Australia) Emerson Jones (final)
4. (United States) Tyra Caterina Grant (third round)
5. (United Kingdom) Hannah Klugman (second round)
6. (United States) Iva Jovic (semifinals)
7. (Czech Republic) Alena Kovačková (first round)
8. (United Kingdom) Mingge Xu (second round)
9. (United States) Kristina Penickova (second round)
10. (Belgium) Jeline Vandromme (quarterfinals)
11. (Japan) Wakana Sonobe (third round)
12. (United States) Kaitlyn Rolls (first round)
13. (Japan) Ena Koike (second round)
14. (Chile) Antonia Vergara Rivera (second round)
15. (Serbia) Teodora Kostović (quarterfinals)
16. (Bulgaria) Iva Ivanova (third round)

Click on the seed number of a player to go to their draw section.

== Draw ==
Key

- Q = Qualifier
- WC = Wild card
- LL = Lucky loser
- Alt = Alternate
- ITF = ITF entry
- PR = Protected ranking
- SR = Special ranking
- SE = Special exempt
- JE = Junior exempt
- JR = Junior Accelerator Programme entrant
- CO = College Accelerator Programme entrant
- NG = Next Gen Accelerator Program entrant
- w/o = Walkover
- r = Retired
- d = Defaulted

=== Finals ===
Quarterfinals
1 | (Slovakia) Renáta Jamrichová | 6 | 6
(Bulgaria) Rositsa Dencheva | 3 | 1
(Czech Republic) Vendula Valdmannová | 3 | 6 | 6
10 | (Belgium) Jeline Vandromme | 6 | 3 | 4
(Poland) Monika Stankiewicz | 2 | 3
3 | (Australia) Emerson Jones | 6 | 6
6 | (United States) Iva Jovic | 6 | 6
15 | (Serbia) Teodora Kostović | 3 | 2

Semifinals
1 | (Slovakia) Renáta Jamrichová | 6 | 6
(Czech Republic) Vendula Valdmannová | 0 | 2
3 | (Australia) Emerson Jones | 7 | 6
6 | (United States) Iva Jovic | 5 | 1

Final
1 | (Slovakia) Renáta Jamrichová | 6 | 6
3 | (Australia) Emerson Jones | 3 | 4

=== Top half ===
==== Section 1 ====
First round
1 | (Slovakia) Renáta Jamrichová | 6 | 6
Q | (United States) Christasha McNeil | 2 | 3
(Czech Republic) Tereza Krejčová | 0 | 1
(Italy) Noemi Basiletti | 6 | 6
WC | (United Kingdom) Brooke Black | 3 | 6 | 3
(Kazakhstan) Sonja Zhiyenbayeva | 6 | 3 | 6
Q | (Spain) Ruth Roura Llaverias | 6^{5} | 6 | 5
13 | (Japan) Ena Koike | 7^{7} | 4 | 7
9 | (United States) Kristina Penickova | 6 | 6
(Ukraine) Yelyzaveta Kotliar | 2 | 1
(Lithuania) Laima Vladson | 6 | 3 | 5
(Germany) Sonja Zhenikhova | 3 | 6 | 7
(Bulgaria) Rositsa Dencheva | 6 | 6
Q | (Israel) Mika Buchnik | 0 | 2
(Netherlands) Joy de Zeeuw | 1 | 1
8 | (United Kingdom) Mingge Xu | 6 | 6

Second round
1 | (Slovakia) R Jamrichová | 6 | 6
(Italy) N Basiletti | 2 | 1
(Kazakhstan) S Zhiyenbayeva | 6 | 6
13 | (Japan) E Koike | 3 | 4
9 | (United States) K Penickova | 6^{5} | 6 | 4
(Germany) S Zhenikhova | 7^{7} | 4 | 6
(Bulgaria) R Dencheva | 6 | 7^{7}
8 | (United Kingdom) M Xu | 3 | 6^{3}

Third round
1 | (Slovakia) R Jamrichová | 7 | 6
(Kazakhstan) S Zhiyenbayeva | 5 | 4
(Germany) S Zhenikhova | 3 | 0
(Bulgaria) R Dencheva | 6 | 6

Quarterfinals
1 | (Slovakia) R Jamrichová | 6 | 6
(Bulgaria) R Dencheva | 3 | 1

==== Section 2 ====
First round
4 | (United States) Tyra Caterina Grant | 6 | 7^{7}
Q | (Austria) Lilli Tagger | 4 | 6^{3}
(Japan) Mayu Crossley | 6 | 6
Q | (Romania) Eva Maria Ionescu | 3 | 4
(Czech Republic) Vendula Valdmannová | 6 | 6
(Brazil) Olivia Carneiro | 1 | 1
WC | (United Kingdom) Daniela Piani | 6 | 2 | 5
14 | (Chile) Antonia Vergara Rivera | 4 | 6 | 7
10 | (Belgium) Jeline Vandromme | 6 | 6
(South Korea) Jang Ga-eul | 1 | 1
WC | (United Kingdom) Hollie Smart | 2 | 0
Q | (United States) Annika Penickova | 6 | 6
(United States) Shannon Lam | 2 | 3
Q | (Slovakia) Mia Pohánková | 6 | 6
WC | (United Kingdom) Flora Johnson | 6 | 6
7 | (Czech Republic) Alena Kovačková | 4 | 2

Second round
4 | (United States) TC Grant | 3 | 6 | 6
(Japan) M Crossley | 6 | 2 | 3
(Czech Republic) V Valdmannová | 6 | 6
14 | (Chile) A Vergara Rivera | 3 | 2
10 | (Belgium) J Vandromme | 6 | 7
Q | (United States) A Penickova | 3 | 5
Q | (Slovakia) M Pohánková | 5 | 2
WC | (United Kingdom) F Johnson | 7 | 6

Third round
4 | (United States) TC Grant | 3 | 5
(Czech Republic) V Valdmannová | 6 | 7
10 | (Belgium) J Vandromme | 6 | 6
WC | (United Kingdom) F Johnson | 1 | 4

Quarterfinals
(Czech Republic) V Valdmannová | 3 | 6 | 6
10 | (Belgium) J Vandromme | 6 | 3 | 4

=== Bottom half ===
==== Section 3 ====
First round
5 | (United Kingdom) Hannah Klugman | 7^{7} | 6
(Italy) Vittoria Paganetti | 6^{4} | 2
(Norway) Emily Sartz-Lunde | 4 | 6^{5}
(Poland) Monika Stankiewicz | 6 | 7^{7}
(Netherlands) Rose Marie Nijkamp | 6 | 6
(Czech Republic) Lucie Urbanová | 3 | 1
WC | (United Kingdom) Hephzibah Oluwadare | 6 | 6
12 | (United States) Kaitlyn Rolls | 1 | 2
16 | (Bulgaria) Iva Ivanova | 2 | 6 | 6
(United Kingdom) Isabelle Lacy | 6 | 2 | 2
(Japan) Reina Goto | 6 | 0 | 6
(Kazakhstan) Asylzhan Arystanbekova | 2 | 6 | 3
(Czech Republic) Eliška Ticháčková | 6 | 6
(United States) Thea Frodin | 4 | 3
Q | (Japan) Shiho Tsujioka | 1 | 2
3 | (Australia) Emerson Jones | 6 | 6

Second round
5 | (United Kingdom) H Klugman | 2 | 6^{8}
(Poland) M Stankiewicz | 6 | 7^{10}
(Netherlands) RM Nijkamp | 3 | 5
WC | (United Kingdom) H Oluwadare | 6 | 7
16 | (Bulgaria) I Ivanova | 6 | 6
(Japan) R Goto | 4 | 2
(Czech Republic) E Ticháčková | 2 | 2
3 | (Australia) E Jones | 6 | 6

Third round
(Poland) M Stankiewicz | 6 | 6
WC | (United Kingdom) H Oluwadare | 2 | 3
16 | (Bulgaria) I Ivanova | 1 | 2
3 | (Australia) E Jones | 6 | 6

Quarterfinals
(Poland) M Stankiewicz | 2 | 3
3 | (Australia) E Jones | 6 | 6

==== Section 4 ====
First round
6 | (United States) Iva Jovic | 6 | 7
(Czech Republic) Julie Paštiková | 1 | 5
(Dominican Republic) Anna María Fedotova | 4 | 4
(Spain) Charo Esquiva Bañuls | 6 | 6
WC | (United Kingdom) Allegra Korpanec Davies | 1 | 6 | 3
(Germany) Julia Stusek | 6 | 4 | 6
(Bulgaria) Elizara Yaneva | 5 | 0
11 | (Japan) Wakana Sonobe | 7 | 6
15 | (Serbia) Teodora Kostović | 6 | 6
(Morocco) Malak El Allami | 1 | 2
(United Kingdom) Mika Stojsavljevic | 6 | 6
(United States) Akasha Urhobo | 3 | 3
(Argentina) Luna María Cinalli | 4 | 6 | 6
(Sweden) Lea Nilsson | 6 | 3 | 3
WC | (United Kingdom) Gabia Paskauskas | 3 | 4
2 | (Czech Republic) Laura Samson | 6 | 6

Second round
6 | (United States) I Jovic | 6 | 6
(Spain) C Esquiva Bañuls | 0 | 2
(Germany) J Stusek | 2 | 2
11 | (Japan) W Sonobe | 6 | 6
15 | (Serbia) T Kostović | 4 | 6 | 7^{10}
(United Kingdom) M Stojsavljevic | 6 | 3 | 6^{8}
(Argentina) LM Cinalli | 5 | 3
2 | (Czech Republic) L Samson | 7 | 6

Third round
6 | (United States) I Jovic | 4 | 7 | 6
11 | (Japan) W Sonobe | 6 | 5 | 0
15 | (Serbia) T Kostović | 6 | 6
2 | (Czech Republic) L Samson | 3 | 4

Quarterfinals
6 | (United States) I Jovic | 6 | 6
15 | (Serbia) T Kostović | 3 | 2

== Qualifying ==
=== Seeds ===
1. (Brazil) Victória Luiza Barros (first round)
2. (Bulgaria) Yoana Konstantinova (first round)
3. (Israel) Mika Buchnik (qualified)
4. (Austria) Lilli Tagger (qualified)
5. (Spain) Ruth Roura Llaverias (qualified)
6. (Slovakia) Mia Pohánková (qualified)
7. (Japan) Hikari Yamamoto (first round)
8. (Poland) Nadia Kulbiej (qualifying competition)
9. (Sweden) Nellie Taraba Wallberg (qualifying competition)
10. (United States) Christasha McNeil (qualified)
11. (Italy) Gaia Maduzzi (first round)
12. (Japan) Shiho Tsujioka (qualified)
13. (Turkey) Ada Kumru (qualifying competition)
14. (France) Ksenia Efremova (qualifying competition)
15. (Canada) Nadia Lagaev (first round)
16. (France) Margot Phanthala (first round)

=== Qualifiers ===
1. (Japan) Shiho Tsujioka
2. (United States) Christasha McNeil
3. (Israel) Mika Buchnik
4. (Austria) Lilli Tagger
5. (Spain) Ruth Roura Llaverias
6. (Slovakia) Mia Pohánková
7. (United States) Annika Penickova
8. (Romania) Eva Maria Ionescu

=== Qualifying draw ===
==== First qualifier ====
First round
1 | (Brazil) Victória Luiza Barros | 4 | 6 | [6]
(United States) Mia Slama | 6 | 3 | [10]
WC | (United Kingdom) Erin Pearce | 4 | 1
12 | (Japan) Shiho Tsujioka | 6 | 6

Qualifying competition
(United States) Mia Slama | 3 | 3
12 | (Japan) Shiho Tsujioka | 6 | 6

==== Second qualifier ====
First round
2 | (Bulgaria) Yoana Konstantinova | 3 | 4
WC | (United Kingdom) Tegan Bush | 6 | 6
(United Kingdom) Hannah Read | 4 | 3
10 | (United States) Christasha McNeil | 6 | 6

Qualifying competition
WC | (United Kingdom) Tegan Bush | 7^{7} | 1 | [7]
10 | (United States) Christasha McNeil | 6^{3} | 6 | [10]

==== Third qualifier ====
First round
3 | (Israel) Mika Buchnik | 4 | 6 | [10]
WC | (United Kingdom) Ciara Moore | 6 | 4 | [8]
WC | (United Kingdom) Hannah Rylatt | 6 | 1 | [4]
9 | (Sweden) Nellie Taraba Wallberg | 4 | 6 | [10]

Qualifying competition
3 | (Israel) Mika Buchnik | 2 | 6 | [10]
9 | (Sweden) Nellie Taraba Wallberg | 6 | 4 | [6]

==== Fourth qualifier ====
First round
4 | (Austria) Lilli Tagger | 7 | 6
(Romania) Maia Ilinca Burcescu | 5 | 4
WC | (United Kingdom) Ruby Cooling | 3 | 4
14 | (France) Ksenia Efremova | 6 | 6

Qualifying competition
4 | (Austria) Lilli Tagger | 4 | 6 | [10]
14 | (France) Ksenia Efremova | 6 | 2 | [6]

==== Fifth qualifier ====
First round
5 | (Spain) Ruth Roura Llaverias | 6 | 6
(United States) Maya Dutta | 3 | 2
(France) Dune Vaissaud | 6 | 1 | [5]
13 | (Turkey) Ada Kumru | 3 | 6 | [10]

Qualifying competition
5 | (Spain) Ruth Roura Llaverias | 6 | 6
13 | (Turkey) Ada Kumru | 1 | 3

==== Sixth qualifier ====
First round
6 | (Slovakia) Mia Pohánková | 6 | 6
(Denmark) Laura Brunkel | 1 | 2
(Germany) Valentina Steiner | 6 | 6
11 | (Italy) Gaia Maduzzi | 2 | 1

Qualifying competition
6 | (Slovakia) Mia Pohánková | 6 | 6
(Germany) Valentina Steiner | 2 | 1

==== Seventh qualifier ====
First round
7 | (Japan) Hikari Yamamoto | 4 | 2
WC | (United Kingdom) Isabella Wong | 6 | 6
(United States) Annika Penickova | 6 | 6
15 | (Canada) Nadia Lagaev | 3 | 2

Qualifying competition
WC | (United Kingdom) Isabella Wong | 5 | 2
(United States) Annika Penickova | 7 | 6

==== Eighth qualifier ====
First round
8 | (Poland) Nadia Kulbiej | 3 | 7 | [10]
(Spain) Meritxell Teixido García | 6 | 5 | [7]
(Romania) Eva Maria Ionescu | 3 | 6 | [10]
16 | (France) Margot Phanthala | 6 | 3 | [4]

Qualifying competition
8 | (Poland) Nadia Kulbiej | 4 | 3
(Romania) Eva Maria Ionescu | 6 | 6
