= 2024 Wimbledon Championships – Wheelchair women's doubles =

Tennis championship

Wheelchair women's doubles
- 2024 Wimbledon Championships

Final
- Champions: (Japan) Yui Kamiji (South Africa) Kgothatso Montjane
- Runners-up: (Netherlands) Diede de Groot (Netherlands) Jiske Griffioen
- Score: 6–4, 6–4

Details
- Draw: 8
- Seeds: 2

Events
Singles	men	women		boys	girls
Doubles	men	women	mixed	boys	girls
WC Singles	men	women	quad
WC Doubles	men	women	quad
Legends	men	women	mixed
14&U Singles	boys	girls
← 2023 ·	Wimbledon Championships	· 2025 →

Yui Kamiji and Kgothatso Montjane defeated defending champions Diede de Groot and Jiske Griffioen in a rematch of the previous year's final, 6–4, 6–4 to win the ladies' doubles wheelchair tennis title at the 2024 Wimbledon Championships.

== Seeds ==
1. (Japan) Yui Kamiji / (South Africa) Kgothatso Montjane (champions)
2. (Netherlands) Diede de Groot / (Netherlands) Jiske Griffioen (final)

== Draw ==
=== Key ===
- Q = Qualifier
- WC = Wild card
- LL = Lucky loser
- Alt = Alternate
- ITF = ITF entry
- PR = Protected ranking
- SR = Special ranking
- SE = Special exempt
- JE = Junior exempt
- JR = Junior Accelerator Programme entrant
- CO = College Accelerator Programme entrant
- NG = Next Gen Accelerator Program entrant
- w/o = Walkover
- r = Retired
- d = Defaulted

=== Finals ===
Quarterfinals
1	(Japan) Yui Kamiji (South Africa) Kgothatso Montjane	6	6
(United States) Dana Mathewson (Japan) Manami Tanaka	3	2
(Colombia) Angélica Bernal (United Kingdom) Lucy Shuker	3	0
(China) Li Xiaohui (China) Zhu Zhenzhen	6	6
(China) Guo Luoyao (China) Wang Ziying	6	3	7
(Netherlands) Lizzy de Greef (Netherlands) Aniek van Koot	4	6	5
(Argentina) María Florencia Moreno (Japan) Momoko Ohtani	0	0
2	(Netherlands) Diede de Groot (Netherlands) Jiske Griffioen	6	6

Semifinals
1	(Japan) Yui Kamiji (South Africa) Kgothatso Montjane	6	6
(China) Li Xiaohui (China) Zhu Zhenzhen	2	2
(China) Guo Luoyao (China) Wang Ziying	3	4
2	(Netherlands) Diede de Groot (Netherlands) Jiske Griffioen	6	6

Final
1	(Japan) Yui Kamiji (South Africa) Kgothatso Montjane	6	6
2	(Netherlands) Diede de Groot (Netherlands) Jiske Griffioen	4	4

== Sources ==
- Draw
