= 2024 Wimbledon Championships – Women's singles qualifying =

Women's singles qualifying
- 2024 Wimbledon Championships

Events
Singles	men	women		boys	girls
Doubles	men	women	mixed	boys	girls
WC Singles	men	women	quad
WC Doubles	men	women	quad
Legends	men	women	mixed
14&U Singles	boys	girls

Qualification
Singles	men	women
← 2023 ·	Wimbledon Championships	· 2025 →

The 2024 Wimbledon Championships – Women's singles qualifying is a series of tennis matches that took place from 25 to 27 June 2024 to determine the qualifiers for the 2024 Wimbledon Championships – Women's singles event, and, if necessary, the lucky losers.

16 of the 128 players who competed in this knockout tournament secured a main draw place.

== Seeds ==
The qualifying entry list was released based on the WTA rankings for the week of 27 May 2024. Seedings are based on WTA rankings as of 17 June 2024.

1. (United States) Katie Volynets (qualified)
2. (China) Bai Zhuoxuan (qualified)
3. (Mexico) Renata Zarazúa (qualifying competition, lucky loser)
4. (United States) Hailey Baptiste (second round)
5. Erika Andreeva (qualifying competition, lucky loser)
6. Maria Timofeeva (first round)
7. (Australia) Arina Rodionova (second round)
8. (Serbia) Olga Danilović (qualifying competition, lucky loser)
9. (Hungary) Anna Bondár (first round)
10. Kamilla Rakhimova (second round)
11. (Brazil) Laura Pigossi (first round)
12. (Latvia) Darja Semeņistaja (first round)
13. (Japan) Mai Hontama (first round)
14. (Slovenia) Tamara Zidanšek (second round)
15. Aliaksandra Sasnovich (second round)
16. (France) Chloé Paquet (second round)
17. (Colombia) Emiliana Arango (first round)
18. (Hungary) Dalma Gálfi (qualified)
19. (Croatia) Jana Fett (first round)
20. (United States) McCartney Kessler (qualified)
21. (Spain) Marina Bassols Ribera (second round)
22. (Czech Republic) Sára Bejlek (first round, retired)
23. (New Zealand) Lulu Sun (qualified)
24. (Ukraine) Daria Snigur (qualified)
25. (Germany) Eva Lys (qualified)
26. (United States) Kayla Day (second round)
27. (Australia) Astra Sharma (first round)
28. (Czech Republic) Linda Fruhvirtová (second round)
29. (United States) Sachia Vickery (second round)
30. (Hungary) Panna Udvardy (qualified)
31. (Netherlands) Suzan Lamens (first round)
32. (Australia) Kimberly Birrell (second round)

== Qualifiers ==
1. (United States) Katie Volynets
2. (China) Bai Zhuoxuan
3. (United States) McCartney Kessler
4. (Germany) Eva Lys
5. (United Kingdom) Sonay Kartal
6. (Australia) Olivia Gadecki
7. (Romania) Anca Todoni
8. (Hungary) Dalma Gálfi
9. (Ukraine) Yuliia Starodubtseva
10. (United States) Robin Montgomery
11. (Hungary) Panna Udvardy
12. (United States) Alycia Parks
13. (Ukraine) Daria Snigur
14. (New Zealand) Lulu Sun
15. (Romania) Elena-Gabriela Ruse
16. (Canada) Marina Stakusic

== Lucky losers ==
1. (Serbia) Olga Danilović
2. (Mexico) Renata Zarazúa
3. Erika Andreeva
4. (France) Elsa Jacquemot

== Draw ==
=== Key ===
- Q = Qualifier
- WC = Wild card
- LL = Lucky loser
- Alt = Alternate
- SE = Special exempt
- PR = Protected ranking
- ITF = ITF entry
- JE = Junior exempt
- w/o = Walkover
- r = Retired
- d = Defaulted
- SR = Special ranking

=== First qualifier ===
First round
1	(United States) Katie Volynets	6	3	6
(Portugal) Francisca Jorge	3	6	3
(Switzerland) Simona Waltert	2	6	7
WC	(United States) Clervie Ngounoue	6	4	5
(Australia) Destanee Aiava	6	6
(Ukraine) Anastasiya Soboleva	3	3
(Australia) Talia Gibson	6	6
19	(Croatia) Jana Fett	3	1

Second round
1	(United States) Katie Volynets	6	6
(Switzerland) Simona Waltert	3	2
(Australia) Destanee Aiava	6^{5}	6	5
(Australia) Talia Gibson	7^{7}	4	7

Qualifying competition
1	(United States) Katie Volynets	6	6
(Australia) Talia Gibson	0	1

=== Second qualifier ===
First round
2	(China) Bai Zhuoxuan	6	6
(China) Gao Xinyu	3	3
(Thailand) Lanlana Tararudee	6	6
Julia Avdeeva	4	3
PR	(Kazakhstan) Zarina Diyas	7	7
(Thailand) Mananchaya Sawangkaew	5	5
(North Macedonia) Lina Gjorcheska	6^{1}	6^{5}
29	(United States) Sachia Vickery	7^{7}	7^{7}

Second round
2	(China) Bai Zhuoxuan	7^{7}	7^{9}
(Thailand) Lanlana Tararudee	6^{4}	6^{7}
PR	(Kazakhstan) Zarina Diyas	3	7	7
29	(United States) Sachia Vickery	6	5	5

Qualifying competition
2	(China) Bai Zhuoxuan	6	7
PR	(Kazakhstan) Zarina Diyas	2	5

=== Third qualifier ===
First round
3	(Mexico) Renata Zarazúa	6	6
(Spain) Leyre Romero Gormaz	3	2
PR	Oksana Selekhmeteva	6	6
(France) Fiona Ferro	3	3
(Australia) Maya Joint	6	6
(Romania) Andreea Mitu	2	3
(Canada) Rebecca Marino	4	7^{7}	4
20	(United States) McCartney Kessler	6	6^{2}	6

Second round
3	(Mexico) Renata Zarazúa	3	6	6
PR	Oksana Selekhmeteva	6	3	4
(Australia) Maya Joint	6	4	2
20	(United States) McCartney Kessler	2	6	6

Qualifying competition
3	(Mexico) Renata Zarazúa	6	3	2
20	(United States) McCartney Kessler	3	6	6

=== Fourth qualifier ===
First round
4	(United States) Hailey Baptiste	7	6
(Germany) Noma Noha Akugue	5	2
(United States) Amanda Anisimova	6	6
(Greece) Valentini Grammatikopoulou	2	3
(France) Séléna Janicijevic	6	6
WC	(United Kingdom) Mika Stojsavljevic	3	4
(Cyprus) Raluka Șerban	4	4
25	(Germany) Eva Lys	6	6

Second round
4	(United States) Hailey Baptiste	7^{7}	5	1
(United States) Amanda Anisimova	6^{3}	7	6
(France) Séléna Janicijevic	3	0
25	(Germany) Eva Lys	6	6

Qualifying competition
(United States) Amanda Anisimova	6	3	4
25	(Germany) Eva Lys	4	6	6

=== Fifth qualifier ===
First round
5	Erika Andreeva	6	6
Polina Kudermetova	3	3
(United States) Elizabeth Mandlik	6^{10}	6	4
(Greece) Despina Papamichail	7^{12}	2	6
(Lithuania) Justina Mikulskytė	4	0
(China) Wei Sijia	6	6
WC	(United Kingdom) Sonay Kartal	7^{8}	6
31	(Netherlands) Suzan Lamens	6^{6}	4

Second round
5	Erika Andreeva	6	7^{7}
(Greece) Despina Papamichail	1	6^{4}
(China) Wei Sijia	4	6	1
WC	(United Kingdom) Sonay Kartal	6	4	6

Qualifying competition
5	Erika Andreeva	3	1
WC	(United Kingdom) Sonay Kartal	6	6

=== Sixth qualifier ===
First round
6	Maria Timofeeva	1	3
(Australia) Olivia Gadecki	6	6
(United States) Elvina Kalieva	0	1
(France) Harmony Tan	6	6
(France) Elsa Jacquemot	3	6	6
WC	(United Kingdom) Emily Appleton	6	3	4
(Chinese Taipei) Yang Ya-yi	6	0	5
21	(Spain) Marina Bassols Ribera	4	6	7

Second round
(Australia) Olivia Gadecki	4	6	6
(France) Harmony Tan	6	4	2
(France) Elsa Jacquemot	7^{7}	6
21	(Spain) Marina Bassols Ribera	6^{4}	4

Qualifying competition
(Australia) Olivia Gadecki	7	4	6
(France) Elsa Jacquemot	5	6	3

=== Seventh qualifier ===
First round
7	(Australia) Arina Rodionova	6	4	6
WC	(United Kingdom) Amelia Rajecki	4	6	4
(China) Ma Yexin	7^{9}	3	4
(Spain) Nuria Párrizas Díaz	6^{7}	6	6
Ekaterina Makarova	3	2
(Romania) Anca Todoni	6	6
(Netherlands) Arianne Hartono	1	6^{6}
32	(Australia) Kimberly Birrell	6	7^{8}

Second round
7	(Australia) Arina Rodionova	5	6^{6}
(Spain) Nuria Párrizas Díaz	7	7^{8}
(Romania) Anca Todoni	6^{2}	7	6
32	(Australia) Kimberly Birrell	7^{7}	5	4

Qualifying competition
(Spain) Nuria Párrizas Díaz	2	4
(Romania) Anca Todoni	6	6

=== Eighth qualifier ===
First round
8	(Serbia) Olga Danilović	6	6
(Italy) Lucrezia Stefanini	3	4
(United States) Louisa Chirico	3	1
(Croatia) Antonia Ružić	6	6
(Turkey) İpek Öz	6	6
WC	(United Kingdom) Mingge Xu	4	4
(United States) Hanna Chang	7^{7}	1	3
18	(Hungary) Dalma Gálfi	6^{4}	6	6

Second round
8	(Serbia) Olga Danilović	5	6	6
(Croatia) Antonia Ružić	7	2	3
(Turkey) İpek Öz	7	1	1
18	(Hungary) Dalma Gálfi	5	6	6

Qualifying competition
8	(Serbia) Olga Danilović	1	6^{6}
18	(Hungary) Dalma Gálfi	6	7^{8}

=== Ninth qualifier ===
First round
9	(Hungary) Anna Bondár	4	0
(Ukraine) Yuliia Starodubtseva	6	6
Anastasia Tikhonova	1	6	6
(Canada) Carol Zhao	6	2	4
(Serbia) Natalija Stevanović	6	7
(Australia) Taylah Preston	3	5
Alt	(Australia) Maddison Inglis	6	1
22	(Czech Republic) Sára Bejlek	4	0^{r}

Second round
(Ukraine) Yuliia Starodubtseva	6	6
Anastasia Tikhonova	1	2
(Serbia) Natalija Stevanović	3	0
Alt	(Australia) Maddison Inglis	6	6

Qualifying competition
(Ukraine) Yuliia Starodubtseva	6	6
Alt	(Australia) Maddison Inglis	4	2

=== Tenth qualifier ===
First round
10	Kamilla Rakhimova	6	1	7
(Germany) Mona Barthel	2	6	5
PR	Vitalia Diatchenko	6	3	4
(United States) Robin Montgomery	1	6	6
(Argentina) Martina Capurro Taborda	2	6^{4}
Alt	(Switzerland) Valentina Ryser	6	7^{7}
(United States) Varvara Lepchenko	6	6
27	(Australia) Astra Sharma	2	4

Second round
10	Kamilla Rakhimova	6^{0}	7^{7}	6^{4}
(United States) Robin Montgomery	7^{7}	6^{4}	7^{10}
Alt	(Switzerland) Valentina Ryser	6	6^{4}	6
(United States) Varvara Lepchenko	2	7^{7}	3

Qualifying competition
(United States) Robin Montgomery	7^{7}	6
Alt	(Switzerland) Valentina Ryser	6^{3}	2

=== Eleventh qualifier ===
First round
11	(Brazil) Laura Pigossi	7^{9}	2	5
Anastasia Zakharova	6^{7}	6	7
(Germany) Ella Seidel	5	4
(Bulgaria) Gergana Topalova	7	6
WC	(United Kingdom) Katy Dunne	7^{8}	4	6^{8}
(Croatia) Tena Lukas	6^{6}	6	7^{10}
(Slovenia) Dalila Jakupović	3	4
30	(Hungary) Panna Udvardy	6	6

Second round
Anastasia Zakharova	0	2
(Bulgaria) Gergana Topalova	6	6
(Croatia) Tena Lukas	2	3
30	(Hungary) Panna Udvardy	6	6

Qualifying competition
(Bulgaria) Gergana Topalova	1	3
30	(Hungary) Panna Udvardy	6	6

=== Twelfth qualifier ===
First round
12	(Latvia) Darja Semeņistaja	4	1
(Czech Republic) Tereza Martincová	6	6
(United States) Alycia Parks	6	6
(Poland) Katarzyna Kawa	0	2
WC	(United Kingdom) Hannah Klugman	6	6
(Croatia) Petra Marčinko	2	2
(Australia) Priscilla Hon	6	6^{1}	6^{7}
28	(Czech Republic) Linda Fruhvirtová	3	7^{7}	7^{10}

Second round
(Czech Republic) Tereza Martincová	1	3
(United States) Alycia Parks	6	6
WC	(United Kingdom) Hannah Klugman	6	0	6
28	(Czech Republic) Linda Fruhvirtová	2	6	4

Qualifying competition
(United States) Alycia Parks	6	6
WC	(United Kingdom) Hannah Klugman	3	3

=== Thirteenth qualifier ===
First round
13	(Japan) Mai Hontama	2	1
(Turkey) Zeynep Sönmez	6	6
(Slovakia) Viktória Hrunčáková	2	6	5
(Slovenia) Polona Hercog	6	3	7
(Ukraine) Katarina Zavatska	6	6
(Switzerland) Céline Naef	2	4
(Switzerland) Jil Teichmann	5	0
24	(Ukraine) Daria Snigur	7	6

Second round
(Turkey) Zeynep Sönmez	2	6	6
(Slovenia) Polona Hercog	6	4	0
(Ukraine) Katarina Zavatska	3	1
24	(Ukraine) Daria Snigur	6	6

Qualifying competition
(Turkey) Zeynep Sönmez	6	5	5
24	(Ukraine) Daria Snigur	1	7	7

=== Fourteenth qualifier ===
First round
14	(Slovenia) Tamara Zidanšek	5	6	6
(China) You Xiaodi	7	3	4
(Philippines) Alexandra Eala	7^{7}	6
(France) Jessika Ponchet	6^{1}	4
(Czech Republic) Gabriela Knutson	7^{8}	6
(Romania) Irina Bara	6^{6}	1
(Romania) Miriam Bulgaru	2	1
23	(New Zealand) Lulu Sun	6	6

Second round
14	(Slovenia) Tamara Zidanšek	6	6^{9}	3
(Philippines) Alexandra Eala	1	7^{11}	6
(Czech Republic) Gabriela Knutson	6	4	6^{6}
23	(New Zealand) Lulu Sun	4	6	7^{10}

Qualifying competition
(Philippines) Alexandra Eala	6^{3}	5
23	(New Zealand) Lulu Sun	7^{7}	7

=== Fifteenth qualifier ===
First round
15	Aliaksandra Sasnovich	6	6
(Slovenia) Veronika Erjavec	2	2
(Croatia) Lea Bošković	6	6
(Croatia) Lucija Ćirić Bagarić	3	4
(Czech Republic) Dominika Šalková	6	6
(United States) Ann Li	4	3
(Romania) Elena-Gabriela Ruse	6	6
17	(Colombia) Emiliana Arango	2	3

Second round
15	Aliaksandra Sasnovich	6	4	4
(Croatia) Lea Bošković	2	6	6
(Czech Republic) Dominika Šalková	4	3
(Romania) Elena-Gabriela Ruse	6	6

Qualifying competition
(Croatia) Lea Bošković	2	2
(Romania) Elena-Gabriela Ruse	6	6

=== Sixteenth qualifier ===
First round
16	(France) Chloé Paquet	6	3	7^{10}
(Argentina) Solana Sierra	3	6	6^{6}
(France) Carole Monnet	0	1
(Canada) Marina Stakusic	6	6
WC	(United Kingdom) Amarni Banks	4	6	6
(France) Kristina Mladenovic	6	4	2
Iryna Shymanovich	2	1
26	(United States) Kayla Day	6	6

Second round
16	(France) Chloé Paquet	6	6^{5}	2
(Canada) Marina Stakusic	4	7^{7}	6
WC	(United Kingdom) Amarni Banks	7^{8}	6
26	(United States) Kayla Day	6^{6}	3

Qualifying competition
(Canada) Marina Stakusic	6	6
WC	(United Kingdom) Amarni Banks	3	0
