= 2024 Wimbledon Championships – Women's singles =

Tennis championship

Ladies' singles
- 2024 Wimbledon Championships

Final
- Champion: (Czech Republic) Barbora Krejčíková
- Runner-up: (Italy) Jasmine Paolini
- Score: 6–2, 2–6, 6–4

Details
- Draw: 128 (16 Q / 8 WC)
- Seeds: 32

Events
Singles	men	women		boys	girls
Doubles	men	women	mixed	boys	girls
WC Singles	men	women	quad
WC Doubles	men	women	quad
14&U Singles	boys	girls
Legends	men	women	mixed

Qualification
Singles	men	women
- Wimbledon Championships

Barbora Krejčíková defeated Jasmine Paolini in the final, 6–2, 2–6, 6–4 to win the ladies' singles tennis title at the 2024 Wimbledon Championships. It was her first Wimbledon singles title and second major singles title overall.

Markéta Vondroušová was the defending champion, but lost in the first round to Jéssica Bouzas Maneiro. This marked only the second time in the Open Era that the defending Wimbledon champion lost in the first round, after Steffi Graf lost to Lori McNeil 30 years prior, in 1994.

Paolini was the first Italian woman in the Open Era to reach the Wimbledon semifinals and final. She became the first woman to reach back-to-back French Open and Wimbledon finals since Serena Williams in 2016, and the first Italian woman in the Open Era to reach the final of two different majors. The semifinal match between Paolini and Donna Vekić was the longest women's semifinal in Wimbledon history, at two hours and 51 minutes.

This marked the final major appearance of 2018 champion, three-time major champion and former world No. 1 Angelique Kerber. She lost in the first round to Yulia Putintseva.

== Seeds ==
1. (Poland) Iga Świątek (third round)
2. (United States) Coco Gauff (fourth round)
3. Aryna Sabalenka (withdrew)
4. (Kazakhstan) Elena Rybakina (semifinals)
5. (United States) Jessica Pegula (second round)
6. (Czech Republic) Markéta Vondroušová (first round)
7. (Italy) Jasmine Paolini (final)
8. (China) Zheng Qinwen (first round)
9. (Greece) Maria Sakkari (third round)
10. (Tunisia) Ons Jabeur (third round)
11. (United States) Danielle Collins (fourth round)
12. (United States) Madison Keys (fourth round, retired)
13. (Latvia) Jeļena Ostapenko (quarterfinals)
14. Daria Kasatkina (third round)
15. Liudmila Samsonova (third round)
16. Victoria Azarenka (withdrew)

17. Anna Kalinskaya (fourth round, retired)
18. (Ukraine) Marta Kostyuk (third round)
19. (United States) Emma Navarro (quarterfinals)
20. (Brazil) Beatriz Haddad Maia (third round)
21. (Ukraine) Elina Svitolina (quarterfinals)
22. Ekaterina Alexandrova (withdrew)
23. (France) Caroline Garcia (second round)
24. Mirra Andreeva (first round)
25. Anastasia Pavlyuchenkova (second round)
26. (Czech Republic) Linda Nosková (second round)
27. (Czech Republic) Kateřina Siniaková (second round)
28. (Ukraine) Dayana Yastremska (third round)
29. (Romania) Sorana Cîrstea (first round)
30. (Canada) Leylah Fernandez (second round)
31. (Czech Republic) Barbora Krejčíková (champion)
32. (United Kingdom) Katie Boulter (second round)

Click on the seed number of a player to go to their draw section.

== Draw ==
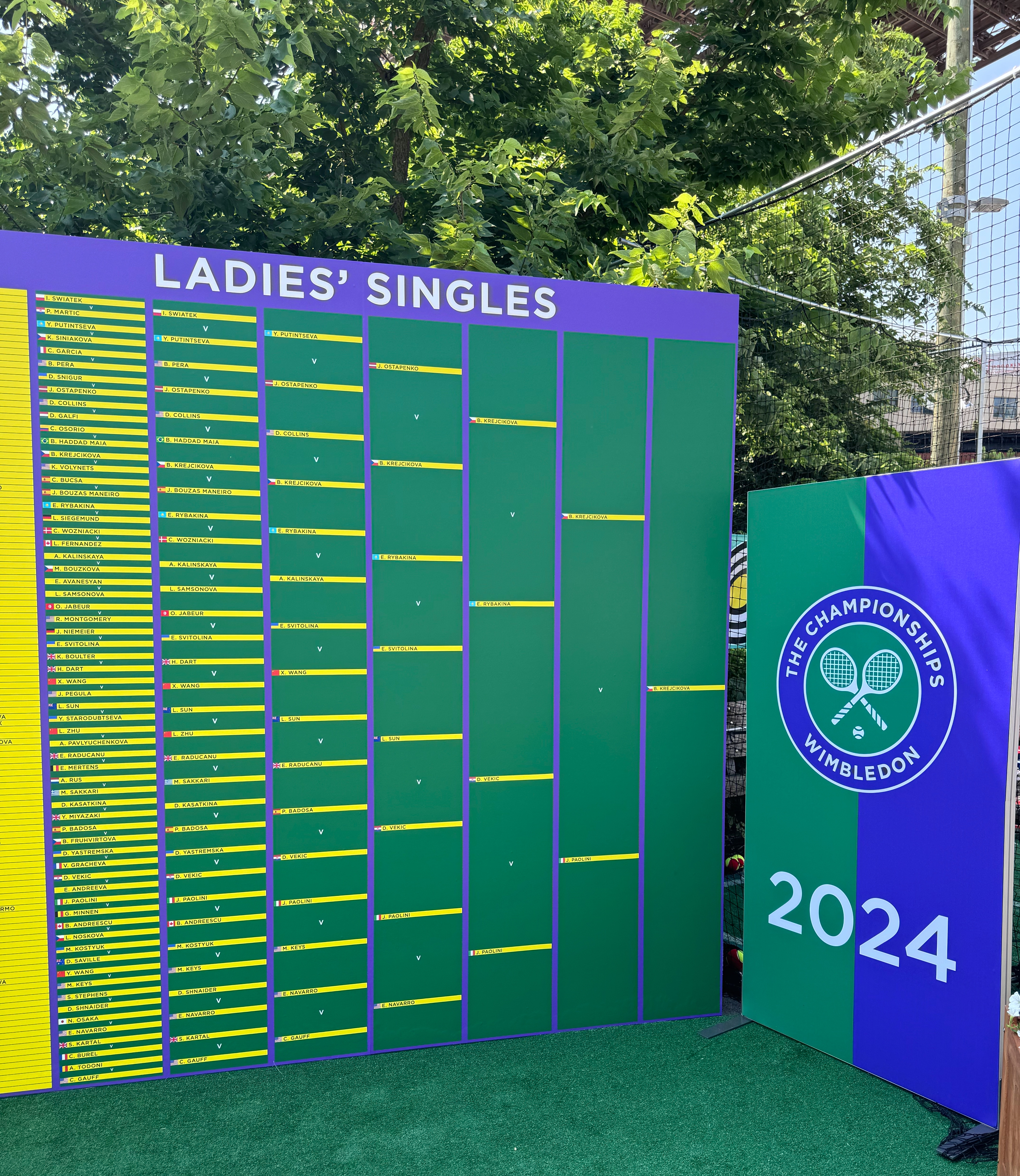
Wimbledon 2024 Ladies’ singles draw

Key

- Q = Qualifier
- WC = Wild card
- LL = Lucky loser
- Alt = Alternate
- ITF = ITF entry
- PR = Protected ranking
- SR = Special ranking
- SE = Special exempt
- JE = Junior exempt
- JR = Junior Accelerator Programme entrant
- CO = College Accelerator Programme entrant
- NG = Next Gen Accelerator Program entrant
- w/o = Walkover
- r = Retired
- d = Defaulted

=== Finals ===
Quarter-finals
13	(Latvia) Jeļena Ostapenko	4	6^{4}
31	(Czech Republic) Barbora Krejčíková	6	7^{7}
4	(Kazakhstan) Elena Rybakina	6	6
21	(Ukraine) Elina Svitolina	3	2
Q	(New Zealand) Lulu Sun	7	4	1
(Croatia) Donna Vekić	5	6	6
7	(Italy) Jasmine Paolini	6	6
19	(United States) Emma Navarro	2	1

Semi-finals
31	(Czech Republic) Barbora Krejčíková	3	6	6
4	(Kazakhstan) Elena Rybakina	6	3	4
(Croatia) Donna Vekić	6	4	6^{8}
7	(Italy) Jasmine Paolini	2	6	7^{10}

Final
31	(Czech Republic) Barbora Krejčíková	6	2	6
7	(Italy) Jasmine Paolini	2	6	4

=== Top half ===
==== Section 1 ====
First round
1	(Poland) I Świątek	6	6
(United States) S Kenin	3	4
WC	(United Kingdom) F Jones	6	1	2
(Croatia) P Martić	3	6	6
(Kazakhstan) Y Putintseva	7	6
WC	(Germany) A Kerber	5	3
Q	(Canada) M Stakusic	4	2
27	(Czech Republic) K Siniaková	6	6
23	(France) C Garcia	6	7
A Blinkova	4	5
(United States) B Pera	6^{4}	6	7^{10}
A Potapova	7^{7}	4	6^{6}
(France) O Dodin	4	0
Q	(Ukraine) D Snigur	6	6
WC	(Australia) A Tomljanović	1	2
13	(Latvia) J Ostapenko	6	6

Second round
1	(Poland) I Świątek	6	6
(Croatia) P Martić	4	3
(Kazakhstan) Y Putintseva	6	4	6
27	(Czech Republic) K Siniaková	0	6	2
23	(France) C Garcia	6	3	4
(United States) B Pera	3	6	6
Q	(Ukraine) D Snigur	3	0
13	(Latvia) J Ostapenko	6	6

Third round
1	(Poland) I Świątek	6	1	2
(Kazakhstan) Y Putintseva	3	6	6
(United States) B Pera	1	3
13	(Latvia) J Ostapenko	6	6

Fourth round
(Kazakhstan) Y Putintseva	2	3
13	(Latvia) J Ostapenko	6	6

==== Section 2 ====
First round
11	(United States) D Collins	6	7^{7}
(Denmark) C Tauson	3	6^{4}
(Egypt) M Sherif	1	2
Q	(Hungary) D Gálfi	6	6
(Colombia) C Osorio	6	6
PR	(United States) L Davis	3	1
(Poland) M Fręch	5	3
20	(Brazil) B Haddad Maia	7	6
31	(Czech Republic) B Krejčíková	7^{7}	6^{1}	7
V Kudermetova	6^{4}	7^{7}	5
(Argentina) ML Carlé	2	5
Q	(United States) K Volynets	6	7
(Spain) C Bucșa	6	4	7^{10}
(Romania) A Bogdan	4	6	6^{5}
(Spain) J Bouzas Maneiro	6	6
6	(Czech Republic) M Vondroušová	4	2

Second round
11	(United States) D Collins	6	6
Q	(Hungary) D Gálfi	3	4
(Colombia) C Osorio	0^{r}
20	(Brazil) B Haddad Maia	3
31	(Czech Republic) B Krejčíková	7^{8}	7^{7}
Q	(United States) K Volynets	6^{6}	6^{5}
(Spain) C Bucșa	6^{1}	3
(Spain) J Bouzas Maneiro	7^{7}	6

Third round
11	(United States) D Collins	6	6
20	(Brazil) B Haddad Maia	4	4
31	(Czech Republic) B Krejčíková	6	4
(Spain) J Bouzas Maneiro	0	3^{r}

Fourth round
11	(United States) D Collins	5	3
31	(Czech Republic) B Krejčíková	7	6

==== Section 3 ====
First round
4	(Kazakhstan) E Rybakina	6	6
Q	(Romania) E-G Ruse	3	1
(Germany) L Siegemund	6	6
PR	(Ukraine) K Baindl	4	1
WC	(Denmark) C Wozniacki	6	6
Q	(United States) A Parks	2	0
(Italy) L Bronzetti	4	3
30	(Canada) L Fernandez	6	6
17	A Kalinskaya	6	6
Q	(Hungary) P Udvardy	3	2
(Czech Republic) M Bouzková	6	6
(Argentina) J Riera	2	1
(Ukraine) A Kalinina	2	3
E Avanesyan	6	6
(Spain) R Masarova	3	6	2
15	L Samsonova	6	4	6

Second round
4	(Kazakhstan) E Rybakina	6	3	6
(Germany) L Siegemund	3	6	3
WC	(Denmark) C Wozniacki	6	2	7
30	(Canada) L Fernandez	3	6	5
17	A Kalinskaya	6	6
(Czech Republic) M Bouzková	4	1
E Avanesyan	3	3
15	L Samsonova	6	6

Third round
4	(Kazakhstan) E Rybakina	6	6
WC	(Denmark) C Wozniacki	0	1
17	A Kalinskaya	7^{7}	6
15	L Samsonova	6^{4}	2

Fourth round
4	(Kazakhstan) E Rybakina	6	3
17	A Kalinskaya	3	0^{r}

==== Section 4 ====
First round
10	(Tunisia) O Jabeur	6	6
(Japan) M Uchijima	3	1
Q	(United States) R Montgomery	6	6
Q	(Australia) O Gadecki	4	4
(Switzerland) V Golubic	2	1
(Germany) J Niemeier	6	6
(Poland) M Linette	5	7^{11}	3
21	(Ukraine) E Svitolina	7	6^{9}	6
32	(United Kingdom) K Boulter	7^{8}	7
(Germany) T Maria	6^{6}	5
(United Kingdom) H Dart	6	6
Q	(China) Z Bai	4	0
(China) Xin Wang	7^{7}	3	6
(Bulgaria) V Tomova	6^{4}	6	0
(United States) A Krueger	2	0
5	(United States) J Pegula	6	6

Second round
10	(Tunisia) O Jabeur	6	7
Q	(United States) R Montgomery	1	5
(Germany) J Niemeier	3	4
21	(Ukraine) E Svitolina	6	6
32	(United Kingdom) K Boulter	6	1	6^{8}
(United Kingdom) H Dart	4	6	7^{10}
(China) Xin Wang	6	6^{7}	6
5	(United States) J Pegula	4	7^{9}	1

Third round
10	(Tunisia) O Jabeur	1	6^{4}
21	(Ukraine) E Svitolina	6	7^{7}
(United Kingdom) H Dart	6	5	3
(China) Xin Wang	2	7	6

Fourth round
21	(Ukraine) E Svitolina	6	6
(China) Xin Wang	2	1

=== Bottom half ===
==== Section 5 ====
First round
8	(China) Q Zheng	6	2	4
Q	(New Zealand) L Sun	4	6	6
PR	(Belgium) A Van Uytvanck	4	3
Q	(Ukraine) Y Starodubtseva	6	6
PR	(Romania) I-C Begu	0	4
(China) L Zhu	6	6
(United States) T Townsend	6^{4}	1
25	A Pavlyuchenkova	7^{7}	6
LL	(Mexico) R Zarazúa	6^{0}	3
WC	(United Kingdom) E Raducanu	7^{7}	6
(Japan) N Hibino	6	2	4
(Belgium) E Mertens	2	6	6
(Netherlands) A Rus	6	6
(China) Y Yuan	2	3
Q	(United States) M Kessler	3	1
9	(Greece) M Sakkari	6	6

Second round
Q	(New Zealand) L Sun	4	6	6
Q	(Ukraine) Y Starodubtseva	6	3	2
(China) L Zhu	6	6
25	A Pavlyuchenkova	4	3
WC	(United Kingdom) E Raducanu	6	6
(Belgium) E Mertens	1	2
(Netherlands) A Rus	5	3
9	(Greece) M Sakkari	7	6

Third round
Q	(New Zealand) L Sun	7^{7}	7^{8}
(China) L Zhu	6^{4}	6^{6}
WC	(United Kingdom) E Raducanu	6	6
9	(Greece) M Sakkari	2	3

Fourth round
Q	(New Zealand) L Sun	6	5	6
WC	(United Kingdom) E Raducanu	2	7	2

==== Section 6 ====
First round
14	D Kasatkina	6	6
PR	(China) S Zhang	3	0
(Germany) T Korpatsch	2	1
WC	(United Kingdom) L Miyazaki	6	6
PR	(Spain) P Badosa	6	6
(Czech Republic) K Muchová	3	2
(Czech Republic) B Fruhvirtová	1	6	6
24	M Andreeva	6	3	2
28	(Ukraine) D Yastremska	6	7^{7}
(Argentina) N Podoroska	1	6^{1}
(Ukraine) L Tsurenko	3	1
(France) V Gracheva	6	6
(Croatia) D Vekić	3	6	6
(China) Xiy Wang	6	3	4
(United States) E Bektas	6^{5}	6	3
LL	E Andreeva	7^{7}	3	6

Second round
14	D Kasatkina	6	6
WC	(United Kingdom) L Miyazaki	0	0
PR	(Spain) P Badosa	6	6
(Czech Republic) B Fruhvirtová	4	2
28	(Ukraine) D Yastremska	3	6	7^{10}
(France) V Gracheva	6	4	6^{5}
(Croatia) D Vekić	6	6
LL	E Andreeva	2	3

Third round
14	D Kasatkina	6^{6}	6	4
PR	(Spain) P Badosa	7^{8}	4	6
28	(Ukraine) D Yastremska	6^{4}	7^{7}	1
(Croatia) D Vekić	7^{7}	6^{3}	6

Fourth round
PR	(Spain) P Badosa	2	6	4
(Croatia) D Vekić	6	1	6

==== Section 7 ====
First round
7	(Italy) J Paolini	7	6
(Spain) S Sorribes Tormo	5	3
(Belgium) G Minnen	7	6
WC	(United Kingdom) H Watson	5	4
PR	(Canada) B Andreescu	6	6
(Romania) J Cristian	4	2
(Italy) S Errani	6^{3}	1
26	(Czech Republic) L Nosková	7^{7}	6
18	(Ukraine) M Kostyuk	6	6
(Slovakia) R Šramková	3	2
(Australia) D Saville	6	6
(United States) P Stearns	4	2
(Slovakia) AK Schmiedlová	0	6	4
(China) Y Wang	6	3	6
(Italy) M Trevisan	4	6^{4}
12	(United States) M Keys	6	7^{7}

Second round
7	(Italy) J Paolini	7^{7}	6
(Belgium) G Minnen	6^{5}	2
PR	(Canada) B Andreescu	6	7^{7}
26	(Czech Republic) L Nosková	3	6^{5}
18	(Ukraine) M Kostyuk	4	7^{7}	6
(Australia) D Saville	6	6^{2}	4
(China) Y Wang	2	2
12	(United States) M Keys	6	6

Third round
7	(Italy) J Paolini	7^{7}	6
PR	(Canada) B Andreescu	6^{4}	1
18	(Ukraine) M Kostyuk	4	3
12	(United States) M Keys	6	6

Fourth round
7	(Italy) J Paolini	6	6^{6}	5
12	(United States) M Keys	3	7^{8}	5^{r}

==== Section 8 ====
First round
LL	(France) E Jacquemot	3	3
(United States) S Stephens	6	6
(Czech Republic) Ka Plíšková	6	4	5
D Shnaider	4	6	7
WC	(Japan) N Osaka	6	1	6
(France) D Parry	1	6	4
PR	(China) Q Wang	0	2
19	(United States) E Navarro	6	6
29	(Romania) S Cîrstea	6	2	0
Q	(United Kingdom) S Kartal	3	6	6
Q	(Germany) E Lys	2	4
(France) C Burel	6	6
LL	(Serbia) O Danilović	5	1
Q	(Romania) A Todoni	7	6
(United States) C Dolehide	1	2
2	(United States) C Gauff	6	6

Second round
(United States) S Stephens	1	1
D Shnaider	6	6
WC	(Japan) N Osaka	4	1
19	(United States) E Navarro	6	6
Q	(United Kingdom) S Kartal	6	5	6
(France) C Burel	3	7	3
Q	(Romania) A Todoni	2	1
2	(United States) C Gauff	6	6

Third round
D Shnaider	6	3	4
19	(United States) E Navarro	2	6	6
Q	(United Kingdom) S Kartal	4	0
2	(United States) C Gauff	6	6

Fourth round
19	(United States) E Navarro	6	6
2	(United States) C Gauff	4	3

== Championship match statistics ==
Category	(Czech Republic) Krejčíková	(Italy) Paolini
1st serve %	55/76 (72%)	62/85 (73%)
1st serve points won	40 of 55 = 73%	38 of 62 = 61%
2nd serve points won	12 of 21 = 57%	14 of 23 = 61%
Total service points won	52 of 76 = 68.42%	52 of 85 = 61.18%
Aces	6	3
Double faults	4	1
Winners	28	19
Unforced errors	37	23
Net points won	11 of 16 = 69%	12 of 16 = 75%
Break points converted	3 of 7 = 43%	2 of 6 = 33%
Return points won	33 of 85 = 39%	24 of 76 = 32%
Total points won	85	76

== Seeded players ==
The following are the seeded players. Seedings are based on WTA rankings as of 24 June 2024. Rankings and points before are as of 1 July 2024.

Seed	Rank	Player	Points before	Points defending	Points earned	Points after	Status
1	1	(Poland) Iga Świątek	11,585	430	130	11,285	Third round lost to (Kazakhstan) Yulia Putintseva
2	2	(United States) Coco Gauff	7,943	10	240	8,173	Fourth round lost to (United States) Emma Navarro [19]
3	3	Aryna Sabalenka	7,841	780	0	7,061	Withdrew due to shoulder injury
4	4	(Kazakhstan) Elena Rybakina	6,026	430	780	6,376	Semifinals lost to (Czech Republic) Barbora Krejčíková [31]
5	5	(United States) Jessica Pegula	5,025	430	70	4,665	Second round lost to (China) Wang Xinyu
6	6	(Czech Republic) Markéta Vondroušová	4,463	2,000	10	2,473	First round lost to (Spain) Jéssica Bouzas Maneiro
7	7	(Italy) Jasmine Paolini	4,228	10	1,300	5,518	Runner-up, lost to (Czech Republic) Barbora Krejčiková [31]
8	8	(China) Zheng Qinwen	4,055	10	10	4,055	First round lost to (New Zealand) Lulu Sun [Q]
9	9	(Greece) Maria Sakkari	3,805	10	130	3,925	Third round lost to (United Kingdom) Emma Raducanu [WC]
10	10	(Tunisia) Ons Jabeur	3,801	1,300	130	2,631	Third round lost to (Ukraine) Elina Svitolina [21]
11	11	(United States) Danielle Collins	3,532	70	240	3,702	Fourth round lost to (Czech Republic) Barbora Krejčíková [31]
12	13	(United States) Madison Keys	3,068	430	240	2,878	Fourth round retired against (Italy) Jasmine Paolini [7]
13	14	(Latvia) Jeļena Ostapenko	3,058	70	430	3,418	Quarterfinals lost to (Czech Republic) Barbora Krejčíková [31]
14	12	Daria Kasatkina	3,283	130	130	3,283	Third round lost to (Spain) Paula Badosa [PR]
15	15	Liudmila Samsonova	2,830	10	130	2,950	Third round lost to Anna Kalinskaya [17]
16	16	Victoria Azarenka	2,399	240	0	2,159	Withdrew due to shoulder injury
17	18	Anna Kalinskaya	2,310	0	240	2,550	Fourth round retired against (Kazakhstan) Elena Rybakina [4]
18	19	(Ukraine) Marta Kostyuk	2,240	130	130	2,240	Third round lost to (United States) Madison Keys [12]
19	17	(United States) Emma Navarro	2,323	10+95	430+81	2,729	Quarterfinals lost to (Italy) Jasmine Paolini [7]
20	20	(Brazil) Beatriz Haddad Maia	2,218	240	130	2,108	Third round lost to (United States) Danielle Collins [11]
21	21	(Ukraine) Elina Svitolina	2,100	780	430	1,750	Quarterfinals lost to (Kazakhstan) Elena Rybakina [4]
22	22	Ekaterina Alexandrova	2,053	240	0	1,813	Withdrew due to illness
23	24	(France) Caroline Garcia	1,938	130	70	1,878	Second round lost to (United States) Bernarda Pera
24	23	Mirra Andreeva	2,018	280	10	1,748	First round lost to (Czech Republic) Brenda Fruhvirtová
25	28	Anastasia Pavlyuchenkova	1,756	(15+95)^{†}	70+1	1,717	Second round lost to (China) Zhu Lin
26	26	(Czech Republic) Linda Nosková	1,775	10	70	1,835	Second round lost to (Canada) Bianca Andreescu [PR]
27	36	(Czech Republic) Kateřina Siniaková	1,546	70	70	1,546	Second round lost to (Kazakhstan) Yulia Putintseva
28	27	(Ukraine) Dayana Yastremska	1,760	30	130	1,860	Third round lost to (Croatia) Donna Vekić
29	31	(Romania) Sorana Cîrstea	1,675	130	10	1,555	First round lost to (United Kingdom) Sonay Kartal [Q]
30	25	(Canada) Leylah Fernandez	1,920	70	70	1,920	Second round lost to (Denmark) Caroline Wozniacki [WC]
31	32	(Czech Republic) Barbora Krejčíková	1,643	70	2,000	3,573	Champion, defeated (Italy) Jasmine Paolini [7]
32	29	(United Kingdom) Katie Boulter	1,748	130	70	1,688	Second round lost to (United Kingdom) Harriet Dart

† The player did not qualify for the main draw in 2023. She is defending points from an ITF event and a WTA 125 event instead.

== Other entry information ==
=== Wildcards ===
- (United Kingdom) Francesca Jones
- (Germany) Angelique Kerber
- (United Kingdom) Lily Miyazaki
- (Japan) Naomi Osaka
- (United Kingdom) Emma Raducanu
- (Australia) Ajla Tomljanović
- (United Kingdom) Heather Watson
- (Denmark) Caroline Wozniacki

=== Special ranking ===
- (Spain) Paula Badosa (34)
- (China) Zhang Shuai (48)
- (Romania) Irina-Camelia Begu (49)
- (United States) Lauren Davis (59)
- (Canada) Bianca Andreescu (64)
- (Ukraine) Kateryna Baindl (86)
- (China) Wang Qiang (94)
- (Belgium) Alison Van Uytvanck (97)

=== Qualifiers ===
- (China) Bai Zhuoxuan
- (Australia) Olivia Gadecki
- (Hungary) Dalma Gálfi
- (United Kingdom) Sonay Kartal
- (United States) McCartney Kessler
- (Germany) Eva Lys
- (United States) Robin Montgomery
- (United States) Alycia Parks
- (Romania) Elena-Gabriela Ruse
- (Ukraine) Daria Snigur
- (Canada) Marina Stakusic
- (Ukraine) Yuliia Starodubtseva
- (New Zealand) Lulu Sun
- (Romania) Anca Todoni
- (Hungary) Panna Udvardy
- (United States) Katie Volynets

=== Lucky losers ===
- Erika Andreeva
- (Serbia) Olga Danilović
- (France) Elsa Jacquemot
- (Mexico) Renata Zarazúa

=== Withdrawals ===
- † (Czech Republic) Petra Kvitová (57) → replaced by (Germany) Jule Niemeier (97)
- † (Switzerland) Belinda Bencic (92) → replaced by (Belgium) Alison Van Uytvanck (97 SR)
- @ (Australia) Ajla Tomljanović (33 SR) → replaced by (United States) Emina Bektas (98)
- § (Italy) Elisabetta Cocciaretto (52) → replaced by (Serbia) Olga Danilović (LL)
- § Ekaterina Alexandrova (22) → replaced by (Mexico) Renata Zarazúa (LL)
- § Aryna Sabalenka (3) → replaced by Erika Andreeva (LL)
- § Victoria Azarenka (16) → replaced by (France) Elsa Jacquemot (LL)

† – not included on entry list
‡ – withdrew from entry list
@ – withdrew from entry list (using special ranking) and received wild card
§ – withdrew from main draw

Preceded by 2024 French Open – Women's singles	Grand Slam women's singles	Succeeded by 2024 US Open – Women's singles
