= 2024 Wimbledon Championships =

- Date: 1–14 July 2024
- Edition: 137th
- Category: Grand Slam (ITF)
- Draw: 128S / 64D / 32XD
- Prize money: £50,000,000
- Surface: Grass
- Location: Church Road; SW19, Wimbledon, London, England
- Venue: All England Lawn Tennis and Croquet Club

Champions

Men's singles
- (Spain) Carlos Alcaraz

Women's singles
- (Czech Republic) Barbora Krejčíková

Men's doubles
- (Finland) Harri Heliövaara / (United Kingdom) Henry Patten

Women's doubles
- (Czech Republic) Kateřina Siniaková / (United States) Taylor Townsend

Mixed doubles
- (Poland) Jan Zieliński / (Chinese Taipei) Hsieh Su-wei

Wheelchair men's singles
- (United Kingdom) Alfie Hewett

Wheelchair women's singles
- (Netherlands) Diede de Groot

Wheelchair quad singles
- (Netherlands) Niels Vink

Wheelchair men's doubles
- (United Kingdom) Alfie Hewett / (United Kingdom) Gordon Reid

Wheelchair women's doubles
- (Japan) Yui Kamiji / (South Africa) Kgothatso Montjane

Wheelchair quad doubles
- (Netherlands) Sam Schröder / (Netherlands) Niels Vink

Boys' singles
- (Norway) Nicolai Budkov Kjær

Girls' singles
- (Slovakia) Renáta Jamrichová

Boys' doubles
- (United States) Alexander Razeghi / (Germany) Max Schönhaus

Girls' doubles
- (United States) Tyra Caterina Grant / (United States) Iva Jovic

Boys' 14&U singles
- (Japan) Takahiro Kawaguchi

Girls' 14&U singles
- (Czech Republic) Jana Kovačková

Gentlemen's invitation doubles
- (United States) Bob Bryan / (United States) Mike Bryan

Ladies' invitation doubles
- (Belgium) Kim Clijsters / (Switzerland) Martina Hingis

Mixed invitation doubles
- (Australia) Mark Woodforde / (Slovakia) Dominika Cibulková
- Wimbledon Championships

The 2024 Wimbledon Championships was a major tennis tournament that took place at the All England Lawn Tennis and Croquet Club in Wimbledon, London, England, comprising singles, doubles and mixed doubles play. Junior, wheelchair, and Invitational tournaments were also scheduled.

It was the 137th edition of the Wimbledon Championships and the third Grand Slam event of 2024. The gentlemen's singles title was won by defending champion Carlos Alcaraz, who defeated Novak Djokovic in a rematch of the previous year's final to lift his fourth Grand Slam title. Barbora Krejčíková defeated Jasmine Paolini in the final to win the ladies' singles title.

== Tournament ==
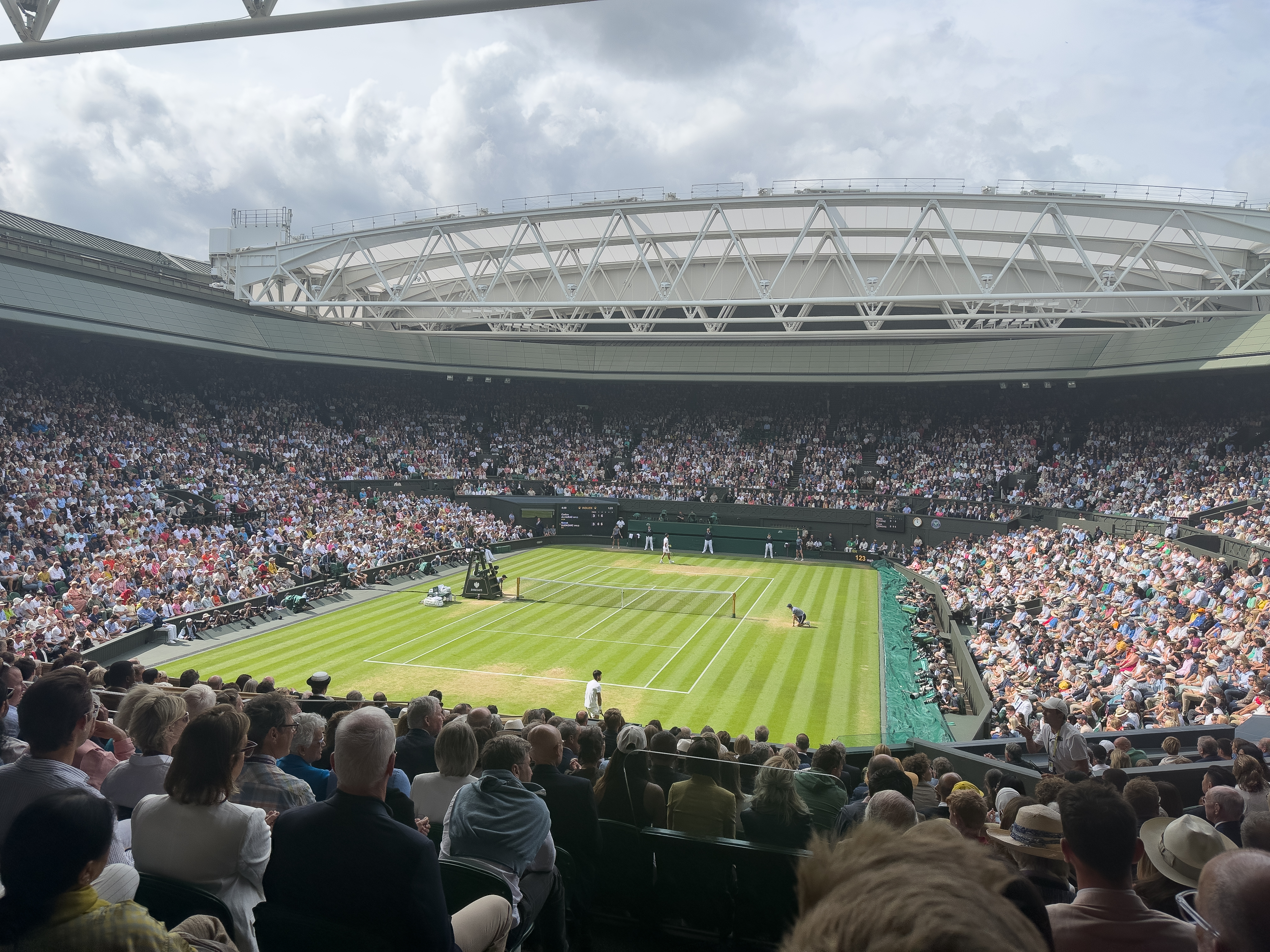
Centre Court in 2023, where the finals of the Wimbledon Championships take place.

The tournament was played on grass courts, with all main draw matches played at the All England Lawn Tennis and Croquet Club, Wimbledon, from 1 July to 14 July 2024. Qualifying matches were scheduled from 24 to 27 June 2024 at the Bank of England Sports Ground in Roehampton.

The 2024 Championships was the 137th edition, the 130th staging of the Ladies' Singles Championship event, the 56th in the Open Era and the third Grand Slam tournament of the year. The tournament was run by the International Tennis Federation (ITF) and was included in the 2024 ATP Tour and the 2024 WTA Tour calendars under the Grand Slam category, as well as the 2024 ITF tours for junior and wheelchair competitions respectively.

The tournament consisted of men's (singles and doubles), women's (singles and doubles), mixed doubles, boys' (under 18 – singles and doubles, under 14 – singles), girls' (under 18 – singles and doubles, under 14 – singles), which was a part of the Grade A category of tournaments for under 18, and singles and doubles events for men's and women's wheelchair tennis players. This edition also featured gentlemen's and ladies' invitational doubles competitions and the new mixed invitational doubles draw introduced in 2022.

This was the tournament's third edition with a scheduled order of play on the first Sunday during the event, dubbed "Middle Sunday". Prior to the 2022 edition, the tournament had seen only four exceptions to the tradition of withholding competition on Middle Sunday to accommodate delayed matches during championships that were heavily disrupted by rain.

This was the first time since 1996 that neither of the Williams sisters appeared in this tournament.

== Singles players ==
- Gentlemen's singles

Gentlemen's singles players
Champion		Runner-up	
(Spain) Carlos Alcaraz [3]		(Serbia) Novak Djokovic [2]	
Semifinals out
Daniil Medvedev [5]		(Italy) Lorenzo Musetti [25]	
Quarterfinals out
(Italy) Jannik Sinner [1]	(United States) Tommy Paul [12]	(United States) Taylor Fritz [13]	(Australia) Alex de Minaur [9]
4th round out
(United States) Ben Shelton [14]	(Bulgaria) Grigor Dimitrov [10]	(France) Ugo Humbert [16]	(Spain) Roberto Bautista Agut
(France) Giovanni Mpetshi Perricard (LL)	(Germany) Alexander Zverev [4]	(France) Arthur Fils	(Denmark) Holger Rune [15]
3rd round out
(Serbia) Miomir Kecmanović	(Canada) Denis Shapovalov (PR)	(France) Gaël Monfils	(Germany) Jan-Lennard Struff
(United States) Frances Tiafoe [29]	(United States) Brandon Nakashima	(Kazakhstan) Alexander Bublik [23]	(Italy) Fabio Fognini
(Argentina) Francisco Comesaña	(Finland) Emil Ruusuvuori	(Chile) Alejandro Tabilo [24]	(United Kingdom) Cameron Norrie
Roman Safiullin	(France) Lucas Pouille (Q)	(France) Quentin Halys (Q)	(Australia) Alexei Popyrin
2nd round out
(Italy) Matteo Berrettini	(Netherlands) Tallon Griekspoor [27]	(Germany) Daniel Altmaier	(South Africa) Lloyd Harris (Q)
(China) Shang Juncheng	(Switzerland) Stan Wawrinka	(China) Zhang Zhizhen [32]	(France) Alexandre Müller
(Australia) Aleksandar Vukic	(Croatia) Borna Ćorić	(Australia) Jordan Thompson	(Netherlands) Botic van de Zandschulp
(Finland) Otto Virtanen (Q)	(France) Arthur Cazaux	(Italy) Lorenzo Sonego	(Norway) Casper Ruud [8]
(Australia) Adam Walton	(Italy) Luciano Darderi	(Japan) Yoshihito Nishioka	(Greece) Stefanos Tsitsipas [11]
(France) Arthur Rinderknech	(Italy) Flavio Cobolli	(United Kingdom) Jack Draper [28]	(United States) Marcos Giron
(Poland) Hubert Hurkacz [7]	(Czech Republic) Tomáš Macháč	(Australia) Thanasi Kokkinakis	(Spain) Jaume Munar
(Brazil) Thiago Seyboth Wild	Karen Khachanov [21]	(Argentina) Tomás Martín Etcheverry [30]	(United Kingdom) Jacob Fearnley (WC)
1st round out
(Germany) Yannick Hanfmann	(Hungary) Márton Fucsovics	(India) Sumit Nagal	(Colombia) Daniel Elahi Galán (LL)
(Chile) Nicolás Jarry [19]	(United Kingdom) Arthur Fery (WC)	(United States) Alex Michelsen	(Italy) Mattia Bellucci (Q)
(Serbia) Dušan Lajović	(Chile) Cristian Garín (Q)	(United Kingdom) Charles Broom (WC)	(France) Adrian Mannarino [22]
(France) Maxime Janvier (Q)	(Hungary) Fábián Marozsán	(France) Hugo Gaston (Q)	(United States) Aleksandar Kovacevic
(Estonia) Mark Lajal (Q)	(Austria) Sebastian Ofner	(Brazil) Felipe Meligeni Alves (Q)	(Italy) Matteo Arnaldi
(Argentina) Sebastián Báez [18]	Pavel Kotov	(United Kingdom) Liam Broady (WC)	(Kazakhstan) Alexander Shevchenko
(Spain) Pedro Martínez	(Australia) Max Purcell	(Belgium) Zizou Bergs (Q)	(Czech Republic) Jakub Menšík
(Argentina) Mariano Navone [31]	(Germany) Maximilian Marterer	(France) Luca Van Assche (LL)	(Australia) Alex Bolt (Q)
Andrey Rublev [6]	(Argentina) Federico Coria	(United Kingdom) Jan Choinski (WC)	(France) Constant Lestienne
(United States) Sebastian Korda [20]	(Portugal) Nuno Borges	(United States) Mackenzie McDonald	(Japan) Taro Daniel
(Australia) Christopher O'Connell	(Japan) Kei Nishikori (PR)	(Australia) Rinky Hijikata	(United Kingdom) Dan Evans
(Sweden) Elias Ymer (Q)	(Argentina) Facundo Díaz Acosta	(United Kingdom) Henry Searle (WC)	(Spain) Roberto Carballés Baena
(Moldova) Radu Albot (Q)	(Switzerland) Dominic Stricker (PR)	(Belgium) David Goffin (LL)	(Argentina) Francisco Cerúndolo [26]
(Canada) Félix Auger-Aliassime [17]	(Serbia) Laslo Djere	(United Kingdom) Billy Harris (WC)	(Australia) James Duckworth (LL)
(South Korea) Kwon Soon-woo (PR)	(United Kingdom) Paul Jubb (WC)	(United States) Christopher Eubanks	Aslan Karatsev
(Italy) Luca Nardi	(Brazil) Thiago Monteiro	(Spain) Alejandro Moro Cañas (Q)	(Czech Republic) Vít Kopřiva (Q)

- Ladies' singles

Ladies' singles players
Champion		Runner-up	
(Czech Republic) Barbora Krejčíková [31]		(Italy) Jasmine Paolini [7]	
Semifinals out
(Kazakhstan) Elena Rybakina [4]		(Croatia) Donna Vekić	
Quarterfinals out
(Latvia) Jeļena Ostapenko [13]	(Ukraine) Elina Svitolina [21]	(New Zealand) Lulu Sun (Q)	(United States) Emma Navarro [19]
4th round out
(Kazakhstan) Yulia Putintseva	(United States) Danielle Collins [11]	Anna Kalinskaya [17]	(China) Wang Xinyu
(United Kingdom) Emma Raducanu (WC)	(Spain) Paula Badosa (PR)	(United States) Madison Keys [12]	(United States) Coco Gauff [2]
3rd round out
(Poland) Iga Świątek [1]	(United States) Bernarda Pera	(Brazil) Beatriz Haddad Maia [20]	(Spain) Jéssica Bouzas Maneiro
(Denmark) Caroline Wozniacki (WC)	Liudmila Samsonova [15]	(Tunisia) Ons Jabeur [10]	(United Kingdom) Harriet Dart
(China) Zhu Lin	(Greece) Maria Sakkari [9]	Daria Kasatkina [14]	(Ukraine) Dayana Yastremska [28]
(Canada) Bianca Andreescu (PR)	(Ukraine) Marta Kostyuk [18]	Diana Shnaider	(United Kingdom) Sonay Kartal (Q)
2nd round out
(Croatia) Petra Martić	(Czech Republic) Kateřina Siniaková [27]	(France) Caroline Garcia [23]	(Ukraine) Daria Snigur (Q)
(Hungary) Dalma Gálfi (Q)	(Colombia) Camila Osorio	(United States) Katie Volynets (Q)	(Spain) Cristina Bucșa
(Germany) Laura Siegemund	(Canada) Leylah Fernandez [30]	(Czech Republic) Marie Bouzková	Elina Avanesyan
(United States) Robin Montgomery (Q)	(Germany) Jule Niemeier	(United Kingdom) Katie Boulter [32]	(United States) Jessica Pegula [5]
(Ukraine) Yuliia Starodubtseva (Q)	Anastasia Pavlyuchenkova [25]	(Belgium) Elise Mertens	(Netherlands) Arantxa Rus
(United Kingdom) Lily Miyazaki (WC)	(Czech Republic) Brenda Fruhvirtová	(France) Varvara Gracheva	Erika Andreeva (LL)
(Belgium) Greet Minnen	(Czech Republic) Linda Nosková [26]	(Australia) Daria Saville	(China) Wang Yafan
(United States) Sloane Stephens	(Japan) Naomi Osaka (WC)	(France) Clara Burel	(Romania) Anca Todoni (Q)
1st round out
(United States) Sofia Kenin	(United Kingdom) Francesca Jones (WC)	(Germany) Angelique Kerber (WC)	(Canada) Marina Stakusic (Q)
Anna Blinkova	Anastasia Potapova	(France) Océane Dodin	(Australia) Ajla Tomljanović (WC)
(Denmark) Clara Tauson	(Egypt) Mayar Sherif	(United States) Lauren Davis (PR)	(Poland) Magdalena Fręch
Veronika Kudermetova	(Argentina) María Lourdes Carlé	(Romania) Ana Bogdan	(Czech Republic) Markéta Vondroušová [6]
(Romania) Elena-Gabriela Ruse (Q)	(Ukraine) Kateryna Baindl (PR)	(United States) Alycia Parks (Q)	(Italy) Lucia Bronzetti
(Hungary) Panna Udvardy (Q)	(Argentina) Julia Riera	(Ukraine) Anhelina Kalinina	(Spain) Rebeka Masarova
(Japan) Moyuka Uchijima	(Australia) Olivia Gadecki (Q)	(Switzerland) Viktorija Golubic	(Poland) Magda Linette
(Germany) Tatjana Maria	(China) Bai Zhuoxuan (Q)	(Bulgaria) Viktoriya Tomova	(United States) Ashlyn Krueger
(China) Zheng Qinwen [8]	(Belgium) Alison Van Uytvanck (PR)	(Romania) Irina-Camelia Begu (PR)	(United States) Taylor Townsend
(Mexico) Renata Zarazúa (LL)	(Japan) Nao Hibino	(China) Yuan Yue	(United States) McCartney Kessler (Q)
(China) Zhang Shuai (PR)	(Germany) Tamara Korpatsch	(Czech Republic) Karolína Muchová	Mirra Andreeva [24]
(Argentina) Nadia Podoroska	(Ukraine) Lesia Tsurenko	(China) Wang Xiyu	(United States) Emina Bektas
(Spain) Sara Sorribes Tormo	(United Kingdom) Heather Watson (WC)	(Romania) Jaqueline Cristian	(Italy) Sara Errani
(Slovakia) Rebecca Šramková	(United States) Peyton Stearns	(Slovakia) Anna Karolína Schmiedlová	(Italy) Martina Trevisan
(France) Elsa Jacquemot (LL)	(Czech Republic) Karolína Plíšková	(France) Diane Parry	(China) Wang Qiang (PR)
(Romania) Sorana Cîrstea [29]	(Germany) Eva Lys (Q)	(Serbia) Olga Danilović (LL)	(United States) Caroline Dolehide

== Events ==
=== Gentlemen's singles ===
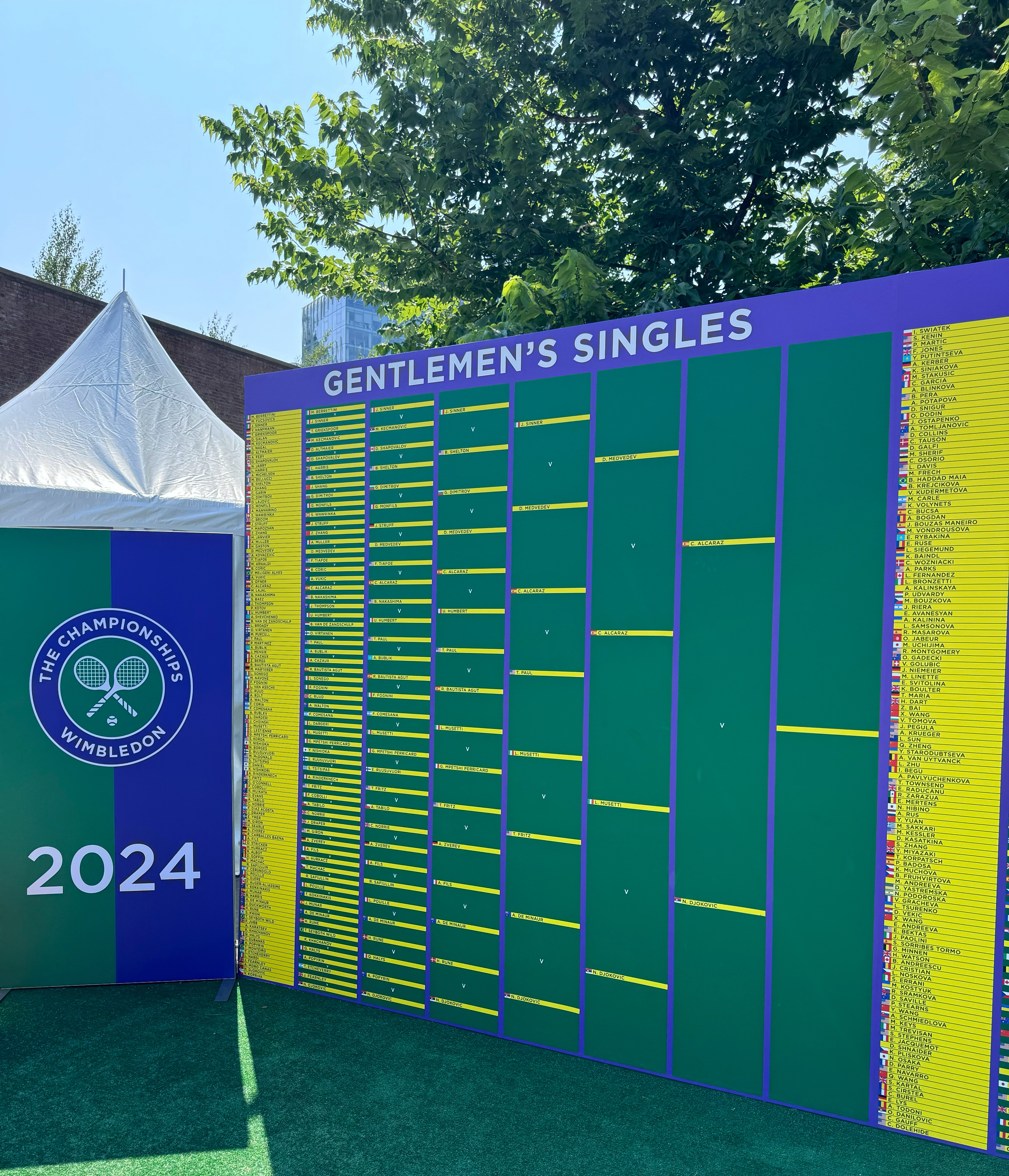
Wimbledon 2024 gentlemen's singles draw

- (Spain) Carlos Alcaraz defeated (Serbia) Novak Djokovic, 6–2, 6–2, 7–6^{(7–4)}

The Gentlemen's singles event began on 1 July with the first of seven total rounds. Thirty-two players were seeded. Of those seeded players, eight were defeated in the first round, notably No. 6 Andrey Rublev, No. 17 Félix Auger-Aliassime, and No. 18 Sebastián Báez. Hubert Hurkacz, Casper Ruud and Stefanos Tsitsipas were the highest of the eight seeded players to exit in the second round, and a further three seeded players were defeated in the third round, with them being No. 22 Alexander Bublik, No. 23 Alejandro Tabilo, and No. 29 Frances Tiafoe. Giovanni Mpetshi Perricard became the first lucky loser to reach the fourth round at Wimbledon since Dick Norman in 1995. Alexander Zverev, Grigor Dimitrov, Ben Shelton were the highest of the five seeded players who were defeated in the Round of 16.

In the quarterfinals, Fifth seed Daniil Medvedev defeated Number 1 seed Jannik Sinner in five sets to snap his five match losing streak against Sinner. Defending champion Carlos Alcaraz won his match against No. 12 Tommy Paul in four sets after losing the opening set. Alex de Minaur withdrew from his quarterfinals match due to a hip injury. As a result of this, Novak Djokovic received a walkover into the semifinals. 25th seed Lorenzo Musetti reached his first ever career major semifinals after winning against 13th seed Taylor Fritz. Their match marked the 37th five-set match at the tournament, the most at any edition of a major in the Open Era. The first semifinal was played between fifth seed Medvedev and third seed Alcaraz. Medvedev won the first set in a tie-breaker, but the Spaniard fought back and won the match in four sets and reached his second consecutive Wimbledon final. In the second semifinal, Djokovic defeated Musetti in straight sets to guarantee a rematch of the previous year's final.

In the final match, Alcaraz broke Djokovic's serve twice (in the very first game of the match and in the 5th game) to take the set, 6–2 in his favour. The Third seed again broke Second seed's serve in the 1st and 7th game of the second set to win this too with the score line of 6–2. Djokovic made some recovery and continued to hold his serve until the 9th game of the third set when the Spaniard broke his serve and had the opportunity to serve for the match. In the 10th game, Alcaraz at one point had three championship points, however Djokovic saved all of them and ending up breaking the third seed's serve for the first time in the match. Both the players held their next service games and forced the set to go to a tie-break. In the end, Carlos Alcaraz won the tie-breaker, 7–4 and won the set, match and the championship. It was his second Wimbledon title and fourth major title overall. He also became the sixth (and youngest) man in the Open Era to complete the Channel Slam.

=== Ladies' singles ===
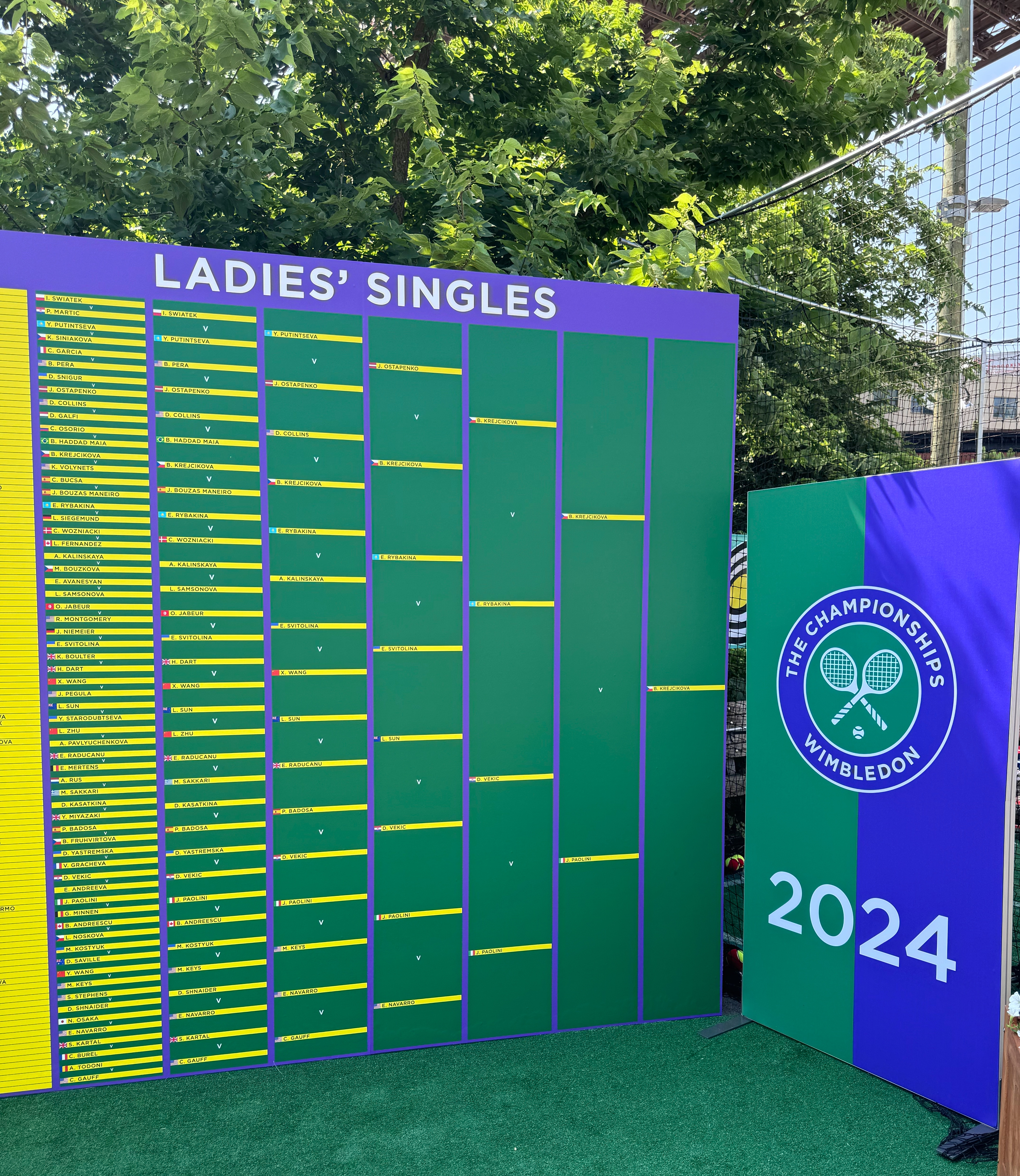
Wimbledon 2024 Ladies’ singles draw

- (Czech Republic) Barbora Krejčíková defeated (Italy) Jasmine Paolini, 6–2, 2–6, 6–4

The Ladies' singles event began on 1 July with the first of seven total rounds. Thirty-two players were seeded. Four seeded players lost in the first round, most notably the No. 6 seed and defending champion Markéta Vondroušová. She lost to Jéssica Bouzas Maneiro. This marked only the second time in the Open Era that the reigning Wimbledon women's singles champion lost in the first round, after Steffi Graf lost to Lori McNeil in 1994. Seven more seeded players fell in the second round, among them No. 5 Jessica Pegula, No. 23 Caroline Garcia and No. 25 Anastasia Pavlyuchenkova. Eight seeded players lost their third round, most notable of them being singles' world No. 1, Iga Świątek. She lost to Yulia Putintseva. This also ended Świątek's 21-match winning streak since the Mutua Madrid Open. Two-times defending finalist tenth seed Ons Jabeur lost her third round match to previous year's semifinalist, No. 21 Elina Svitolina. 12th seed Madison Keys was forced to retire from her fourth-round match after a hamstring injury during the match. The American was at one moment leading 5–2 in the final set and had served for match twice. Three other seeded players lost their pre-quarterfinal matches including the second seeded Coco Gauff. Last remaining British player in either of the main singles draw, wildcard Emma Raducanu also lost her fourth round match. She lost to qualifier Lulu Sun. Sun became the first woman representing New Zealand to reach the fourth round of a major since Belinda Cordwell at the 1989 Australian Open, and the first to reach the quarterfinals of Wimbledon in the Open Era. She is also the first qualifier to reach the Wimbledon quarterfinals since Kaia Kanepi in 2010.

Sun and Donna Vekić were the only two unseeded players to reach the quarterfinals. They faced off in the first quarterfinal which was won by Vekić after losing the first set. Vekić is the first Croatian woman to reach the semifinals of the Wimbledon since Mirjana Lučić-Baroni in 1999. Seventh seed Jasmine Paolini defeated 17th seed Emma Navarro in straight sets to become the first Italian woman to reach the semifinals in the Open Era. 2022 champion and fourth seeded, Elena Rybakina won in straight sets against Svitolina, losing just five games in the process. 31st seed Barbora Krejčíková achieved victory against 13th seed Jeļena Ostapenko. In the first semifinal, Vekić met Paolini. Vekić started off strong by breaking Paolini's serve twice and won four consecutive games to win the first set 6–2. Paolini won the second of two break points, having saved three on her own serve, and took the second set 6–4. In the third set, both the Italian and the Croatian broke each other's serve twice before taking it to the super tie-breaker. The 7th seed won the tie-breaker 10–8 to reach second consecutive Grand Slam final. She also become the first woman to reach back-to-back French Open and Wimbledon finals since Serena Williams in 2016 and the first Italian woman in the Open Era to reach the final of two different Grand Slams. In the second semifinal match, Elena Rybakina played against Barbora Krejčíková. In the first set, Rybakina surged ahead with a 4–0 lead. During her opponent's service games, she had break points in all four instances, successfully converting three of them. In the second set, the Czech player broke Kazakh player's serve in the 6th game of the set to win the set, 6–3. Neither woman had a break point in the third set until 3–3, when the 31st seed broke former champion's serve to take the lead in the deciding set. Krejčíková won the set 6–4 to reach her first Grand Slam final since winning the French Open three years ago. Rybakina's loss also guaranteed a first-time Wimbledon champion for the seventh consecutive edition.

In the final match, Barbora Krejčíková got an early lead after she broke Paolini's serve on the first game of the first set. She again broke No. 7's serve in the fifth game to win the first set, 6–2. Paolini bounced back in the second set. She won the first three games of the set. The Italian end up winning the set, 6–2 in her favour. The third set was on level until the Czech player got her first break points of the set and Paolini double-faulted to give away a 4–3 lead. Krejčíková held on to that lead and was serving for the match. Even though the Italian saved two championship points, the 31st seed was finally able to convert the third championship point to win the game, set, match and the tournament. It was Krejčíková's second major singles title.

=== Gentlemen's doubles ===
- (Finland) Harri Heliövaara / (United Kingdom) Henry Patten defeated (Australia) Max Purcell / (Australia) Jordan Thompson, 6–7^{(7–9)}, 7–6^{(10–8)}, 7–6^{(11–9)}

The Gentlemen's doubles event began on 3 July with the first of six total rounds. Sixteen teams were seeded. In the first round, three seeded pairs lost; the highest seeded of them was No. 5 Simone Bolelli and Andrea Vavassori. Former singles ATP world No. 1 player, Andy Murray played alongside his brother Jamie Murray as the wildcards. They lost their first round match against the Australian duo of Rinky Hijikata and John Peers in the straight sets. This was Andy Murray's last match at the Wimbledon. Five seeded teams lost in the second round, including 2 of the top 3 teams, them being No. 2 Rohan Bopanna and Matthew Ebden and No. 3 Rajeev Ram and Joe Salisbury. In third round, only two seeded teams lost, them being No. 12 Nathaniel Lammons/Jackson Withrow and No.16 Sadio Doumbia/Fabien Reboul.

In the quarterfinals, the top-seeded pair of Marcel Granollers and Horacio Zeballos defeated 8th seeds Kevin Krawietz and Tim Pütz in straight sets. 15th seeds Max Purcell and Jordan Thompson won against No. 11 pair of Máximo González and Andrés Molteni. Unseeded pair of Harri Heliövaara and Henry Patten upset fourth seeds Marcelo Arévalo and Mate Pavić. 9th seeded pair of Neal Skupski (also the defending champion) and Michael Venus defeated unseeded pair of Constantin Frantzen and Hendrik Jebens. In the Semifinals, 2022 champion Purcell and Thompson defeated Granollers and Zeballos. while Heliövaara and Patten ousted the defending champion Skupski and his partner Venus. Heliövaara and Patten defeated Purcell and Thompson in the final. They saved three championship points en route to both players' first major title in men's doubles. Heliövaara became the first Finnish man to lift the doubles trophy at the All England Club. Heliövaara and Patten became the first unseeded team to win the title since Vasek Pospisil and Jack Sock in 2014. Patten becomes only the third British man of the Open era – alongside Jonathan Marray in 2012 and Neal Skupski in 2023 – to lift the Wimbledon doubles trophy.

=== Ladies' doubles ===
- (Czech Republic) Kateřina Siniaková / (United States) Taylor Townsend defeated (Canada) Gabriela Dabrowski / (New Zealand) Erin Routliffe, 7–6^{(7–5)}, 7–6^{(7–1)}

The Ladies' doubles event began on 3 July with the first of six total rounds. Sixteen teams were seeded. All but 2 (No.6 Demi Schuurs/Luisa Stefani and No. 13 Giuliana Olmos/Alexandra Panova) of the 16 seeded teams in the draw advanced into the second round. The second round saw the loss of three seeded pairs including third seeds Nicole Melichar-Martinez/Ellen Perez. A further four pairs fell in the third round; the highest of them being No. 5 Sara Errani and Jasmine Paolini. Bethanie Mattek-Sands, who was vying for a career Grand Slam also lost in the third round.

Seven seeded pairs qualified for the quarterfinals alongside one unseeded pair of Tímea Babos and Nadiia Kichenok. In the quarterfinals, First seeded par of Hsieh Su-wei (also the defending champion) and Elise Mertens defeated 11th seeds Coco Gauff and Jessica Pegula in straight sets, losing just three games. The pair of Babos and Kichenok lost to seventh seeds Caroline Dolehide and Desirae Krawczyk. Former two-time Wimbledon champion, Kateřina Siniaková and her partner Taylor Townsend won against 9th seeded pair of Lyudmyla Kichenok and Jeļena Ostapenko. Meanwhile, Siniaková's former partners Barbora Krejčíková and Laura Siegemund lost to the second seeds Gabriela Dabrowski and Erin Routliffe. In the first semifinal, Siniaková and Townsend defeated the number one seeds Hsieh Su-wei and Elise Mertens after losing the first set. This marked the end to the Hsieh's 22 match winning streak at Wimbledon, dating back to the 2019 edition. Dolehide and Krawczyk lost their semifinal match in straight sets to Dabrowski and Routliffe. By reaching the final, Erin Routliffe will attain the WTA No. 1 doubles ranking at the end of the tournament. Mertens, Siniaková, and Laura Siegemund were also in contention for the No. 1 ranking at the beginning of the tournament. Siniaková and Townsend defeated Dabrowski and Routliffe in the final. It was the first major women's doubles title for Townsend and ninth (and third Wimbledon title) for Siniaková, the latter of whom completed the Channel Slam (having won the French Open partnering Coco Gauff).

=== Mixed doubles ===
- (Poland) Jan Zieliński / (Chinese Taipei) Hsieh Su-wei defeated (Mexico) Santiago González / (Mexico) Giuliana Olmos, 6–4, 6–2

The Mixed doubles event began on 8 July with the first of five total rounds. Eight teams were seeded. Because of the weather during the first week, the final had to be delayed until Sunday, and the first two rounds were played with a super tie-break in lieu of a final set. The two sets were still played with ad-scoring. Four out of eight seeded teams lost in the first round including the top seeded pair of Matthew Ebden and Ellen Perez. Of the remaining four only one didn't advance into the quarterfinals, viz. the third seeds and defending champions, Mate Pavić and Lyudmyla Kichenok. They withdrew from their second-round match due to Kichenok's illness. Two times former champions, Desirae Krawczyk and Neal Skupski were the only pair to lose their quarterfinals match. In the semifinals, Santiago González and Giuliana Olmos defeated the pair of Ulrikke Eikeri and Máximo González in straight sets. By doing so, they became the first Mexican duo to reach the mixed doubles final at Wimbledon. Olmos also became the first Mexican woman finalist in the Open Era at the All England Club at the same event. In the other semifinal, 7th seeded pair of Jan Zieliński and Hsieh Su-wei defeated second seeds Michael Venus and Erin Routliffe to reach their second major final of the season. Zieliński and Hsieh defeated González and Olmos in the final to win the title. It was their second major mixed-doubles title of the year and their career as well.

=== Wheelchair gentlemen's singles ===
- (United Kingdom) Alfie Hewett defeated (Spain) Martín de la Puente 6–2, 6–3

The Wheelchair gentlemen's singles event began on 9 July with the Round of 16. The field was composed of 16 player with 4 seeded players. The draw was increased from eight player field in the previous editions. All four seeded players won their first round and quarterfinals matches. In the semifinals, the first seeded and defending champion Tokito Oda lost to Martín de la Puente. La Puente became the first Spaniard to reach the wheelchair singles final. Meanwhile, Alfie Hewett defeated third seeded Gustavo Fernández in three sets. Hewett defeated the Spaniard in straight sets to win his ninth major title and complete his career Grand Slam.

=== Wheelchair ladies' singles ===
- (Netherlands) Diede de Groot defeated (Netherlands) Aniek van Koot, 6–4, 6–4

The Wheelchair ladies' singles event began on 9 July with the Round of 16. The field was composed of 16 player with 4 seeded players. The draw was increased from eight player field in the previous editions. All seeded players won their first round matches. Third seed and previous year's finalist Jiske Griffioen lost in the quarterfinals, while second seed Yui Kamiji lost in the semifinals. Three-time defending champion Diede de Groot defeated Aniek van Koot in the final to win her 15th consecutive major title and record-extending 23rd overall.

=== Wheelchair quad singles ===
- (Netherlands) Niels Vink defeated (Netherlands) Sam Schröder, 7–6^{(7–4)}, 6–4

The wheelchair quad singles tournament began on 10 July with the quarterfinal round. The field was composed of eight players; Sam Schröder and defending champion Niels Vink received the top two seeds and the other six players were unseeded. In the opening round, all the winners won their matches in straight sets. In the semifinals, unseeded Andy Lapthorne lost to Schröder in straight sets, while Vink won also won his match against Guy Sasson in straight sets. Niels Vink successfully defended his title by winning the final match against Sam Schröder.

=== Wheelchair gentlemen's doubles ===
- (United Kingdom) Alfie Hewett / (United Kingdom) Gordon Reid defeated (Japan) Takuya Miki / (Japan) Tokito Oda, 6–4, 7–6^{(7–2)}

The wheelchair gentlemen's doubles competition featured the same 16 players that contested the singles event. Two of the eight pairs were seeded: defending champions Alfie Hewett and Gordon Reid received the top seed, and the second seed went to Takuya Miki and Tokito Oda. Both the seeded teams won their both the quarterfinals, and semifinals. Defending champions Hewett and Reid won the title by defeating the all Japanese duo in the final.

=== Wheelchair ladies' doubles ===
- (Japan) Yui Kamiji / (South Africa) Kgothatso Montjane defeated (Netherlands) Diede de Groot / (Netherlands) Jiske Griffioen, 6–4, 6–4

As with the gentlemen's competition, the wheelchair ladies' doubles event featured the same 16 players as in the singles event. Two of the eight pairs were seeded: Yui Kamiji and Kgothatso Montjane received the top seed, and the second seed went to the defending champions Diede de Groot and Jiske Griffioen. Both these seeds won their quarterfinal and semifinal matches. Kamiji and Montjane won the championship by defeating the defending champions in the final.

=== Wheelchair quad doubles ===
- (Netherlands) Sam Schröder / (Netherlands) Niels Vink defeated (United Kingdom) Andy Lapthorne / (Israel) Guy Sasson, 3–6, 7–6^{(7–3)}, 6–3

The wheelchair quad doubles tournament began on 12 July with the semifinal round. The field was composed of four pairs, consisting of eight players that played the singles event. Both the seeds won their semifinal matches. Two-time defending champions Sam Schröder and Niels Vink won the title by defeating Andy Lapthorne and Guy Sasson in the final.

=== Boys' singles ===
- (Norway) Nicolai Budkov Kjær defeated (Netherlands) Mees Röttgering, 6–3, 6–3

Of the sixteen seeded players, only four made it through the first three rounds and into the quarterfinals: No. 1 Kaylan Bigun, No. 2 Nicolai Budkov Kjær, No. 10 Maxim Mrva and No. 16 Théo Papamalamis. Mrva won the third round against Mark Ceban, who was the previous year's 14&Under champion at Wimbledon. Bigun and Mrva lost in the quarterfinals. In the semifinals, unseeded Mees Röttgering won against 16th seed Papamalamis in straight sets, while second seed Budkov Kjær won his match against unseeded Naoya Honda in straight sets, losing just five games in he process. Nicolai Budkov Kjær won the championship by emerging victorious against his Dutch opponent in straight sets, becoming the first Norwegian to win a junior major singles title.

=== Girls' singles ===
- (Slovakia) Renáta Jamrichová defeated (Australia) Emerson Jones, 6–3, 6–4

Of the sixteen seeded players, only five made it through the first three rounds and into the quarterfinals. Two seeded players lost in the quarterfinals: No. 10 Jeline Vandromme and No. 15 Teodora Kostović. In the semifinals, top seed Renáta Jamrichová ousted unseeded Vendula Valdmannová in straight sets, losing just two games. Third seed Emerson Jones defeated sixth seed Iva Jovic to reach the final. The final between Jamrichová and Jones will be a rematch of their Australian Open final earlier in the year. Renáta Jamrichová won her second junior grand slam title of the year by defeating Jones in the final.

=== Boys' doubles ===
- (United States) Alexander Razeghi / (Germany) Max Schönhaus defeated (Czech Republic) Jan Klimas / (Czech Republic) Jan Kumstát, 7–6^{(7–1)}, 6–4

Of the eight pairs that were seeded at the start of the tournament, only two made it into the semifinals. However, both pairs lost their semifinal matches to two unseeded pairs. Alexander Razeghi and Max Schönhaus won the title by winning the final match in straight sets.

=== Girls' doubles ===
- (United States) Tyra Caterina Grant / (United States) Iva Jovic defeated (United Kingdom) Mika Stojsavljevic / (United Kingdom) Mingge Xu, 7–5, 4–6, [10–8]

Of the eight pairs that were seeded at the start of the tournament, three qualified for the semifinal round. In the semifinals, seventh seeds Mika Stojsavljevic and Mingge Xu won by ousting the unseeded pair of Julie Paštiková and Julia Stusek, while the sixth seeded pair of Emerson Jones and Vittoria Paganetti were knocked out by the second seeds, Tyra Caterina Grant and Iva Jovic. Grant and Jovic emerged as the winners in the final.

=== Boys' 14&U singles ===
- (Japan) Takahiro Kawaguchi defeated (United States) Jordan Lee, 6–2, 6–2

Boys 14&Under events was played in the Round-robin format, under which 16 players were divided into four groups with group leaders advancing into the semifinals. Takahiro Kawaguchi and Jordan Lee reached the final by defeating Stan Put and Dongjae Kim in the semifinals, respectively. Kawaguchi claimed the title by defeating Lee in the final.

=== Girls' 14&U singles ===
- (Czech Republic) Jana Kovačková defeated (Latvia) Keisija Bērziņa, 5–7, 6–3, [10–2]

Girls 14&Under events was played in the Round-robin format, under which 16 players were divided into four groups with group leaders advancing into the semifinals. In the semifinals, Jana Kovačková downed Megan Knight and Keisija Bērziņa defeated Xinran Sun. Kovačková won the championship by defeating Bērziņa in the final.

=== Gentlemen's invitation doubles ===
- (United States) Bob Bryan / (United States) Mike Bryan defeated (South Africa) Kevin Anderson / (Australia) Lleyton Hewitt, 6–1, 6–4

Sixteen former professional tennis players competed in a round-robin stage in pairs of two distributed over two groups. The winners of each group faced each other in the final. At the conclusion of the group stage, Kevin Anderson and Lleyton Hewitt from Group A and the Bryan brothers from group B, advanced into the final, respectively. Two-time defending champions, Bryan brothers successfully defended their title.

=== Ladies' invitation doubles ===
- (Belgium) Kim Clijsters / (Switzerland) Martina Hingis defeated (Australia) Ashleigh Barty / (Australia) Casey Dellacqua, 6–3, 6–2

Sixteen former professional tennis players competed in a round-robin stage in pairs of two distributed over two groups. The winners of each group faced each other in the final. At the conclusion of the group stage, Kim Clijsters and Martina Hingis from Group A and Ashleigh Barty and Casey Dellacqua from group B, advanced into the final, respectively. Two-time defending champions, Clijsters and Hingis won the title by defeating the all Australian duo in straight sets.

=== Mixed invitation doubles ===
- (Australia) Mark Woodforde / (Slovakia) Dominika Cibulková defeated (Serbia) Nenad Zimonjić / (Austria) Barbara Schett 6–3, 6–2

Sixteen former professional tennis players competed in a round-robin stage in pairs of two distributed over two groups. The winners of each group faced each other in the final. At the conclusion of the group stage, Mark Woodforde and Dominika Cibulková from Group A, Nenad Zimonjić and Barbara Schett from group B, advanced into the final, respectively. Woodforde and Cibulková claimed the title by winning the final.

== Champions ==
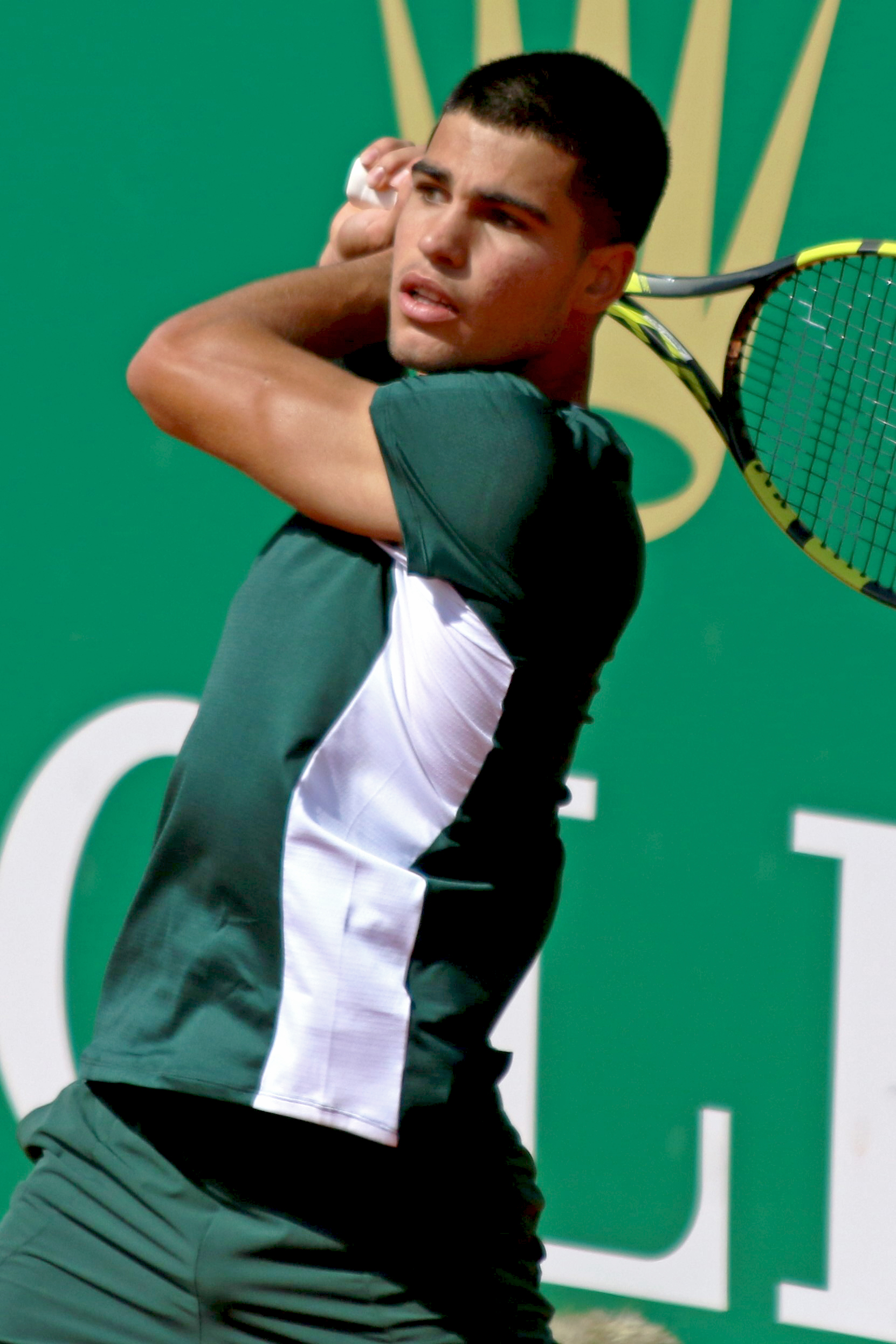
Carlos Alcaraz, the gentlemen's singles champion.

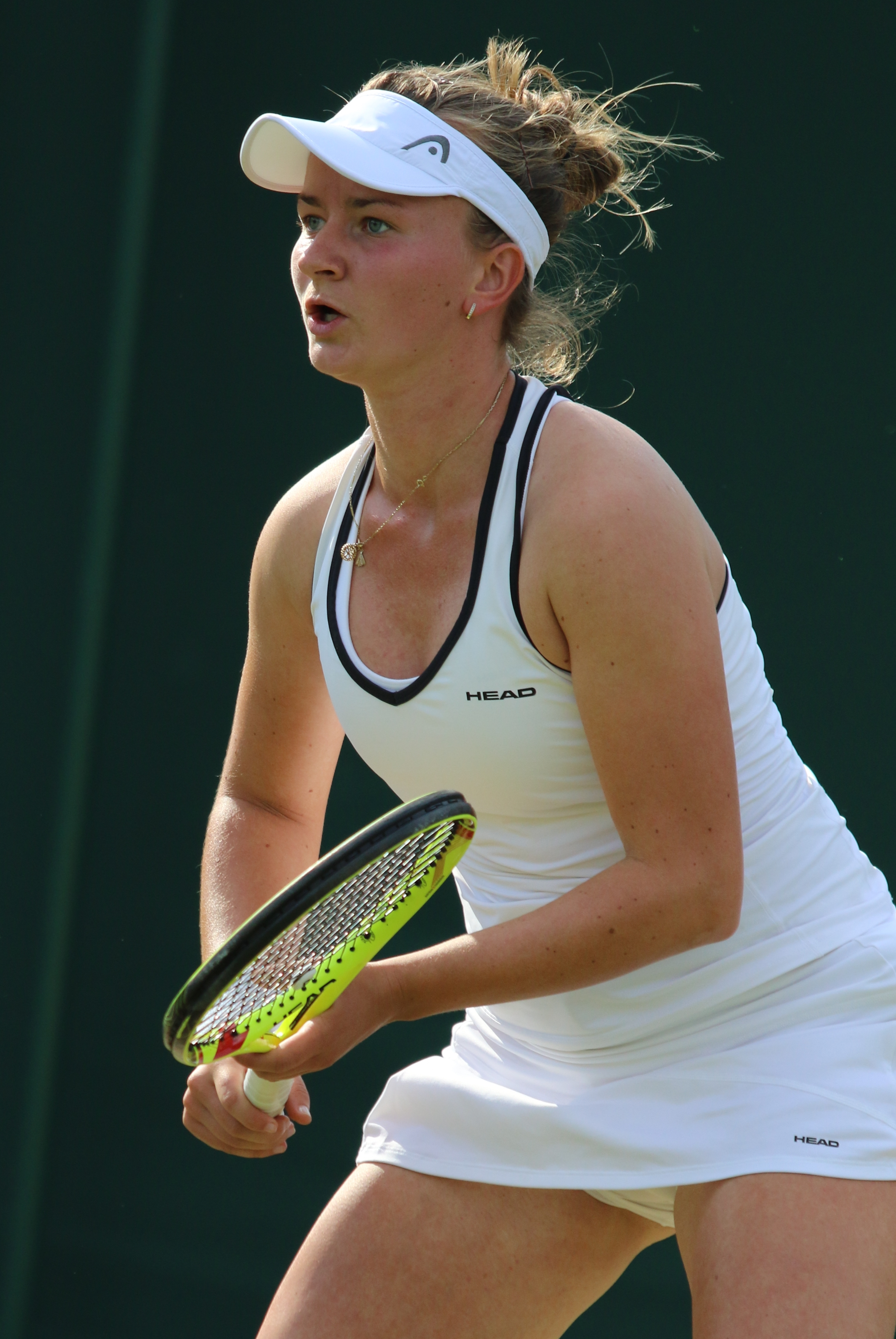
Barbora Krejčíková, the ladies' singles champion. It was her second major title.

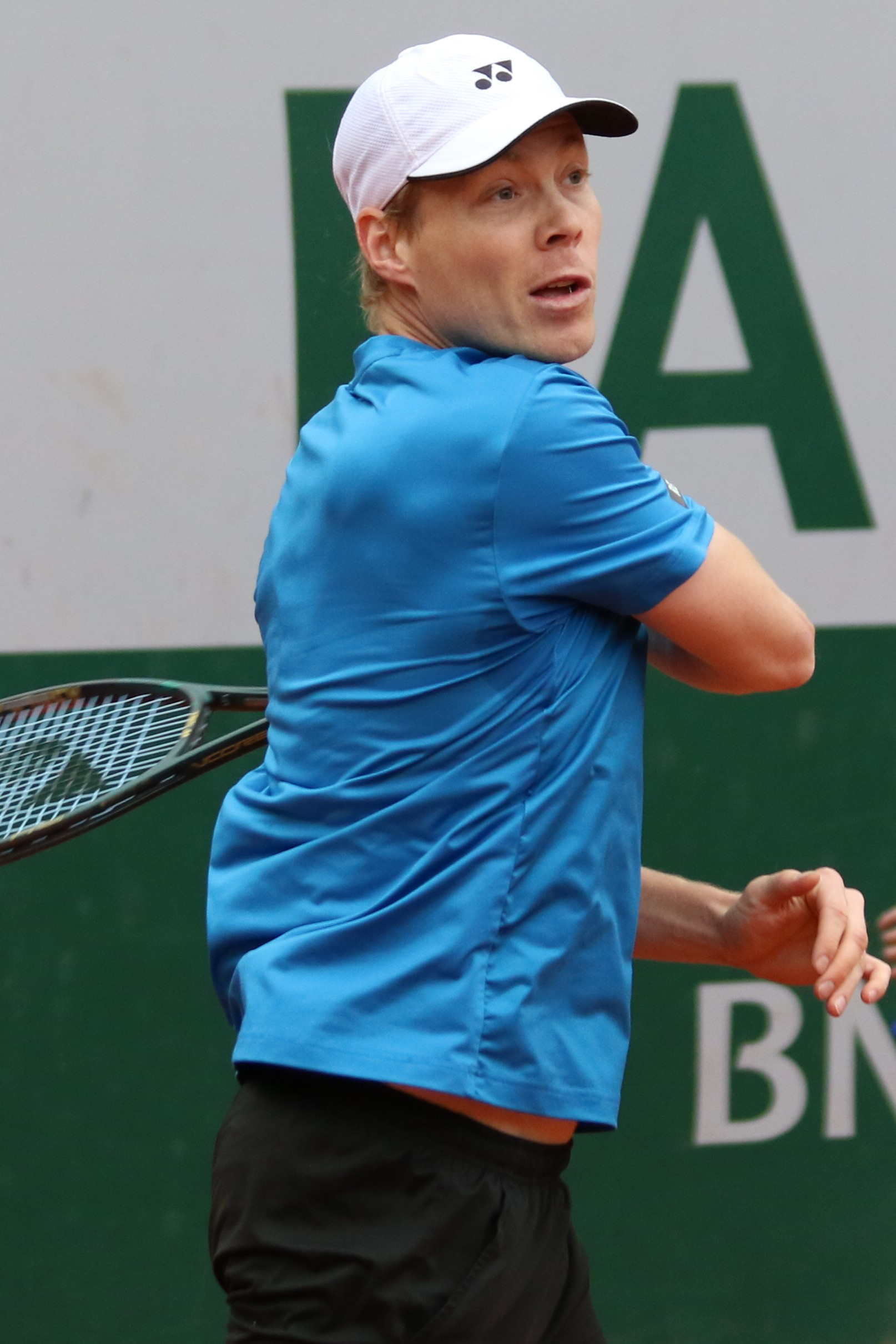
Harri Heliövaara was part of the winning men's doubles team.

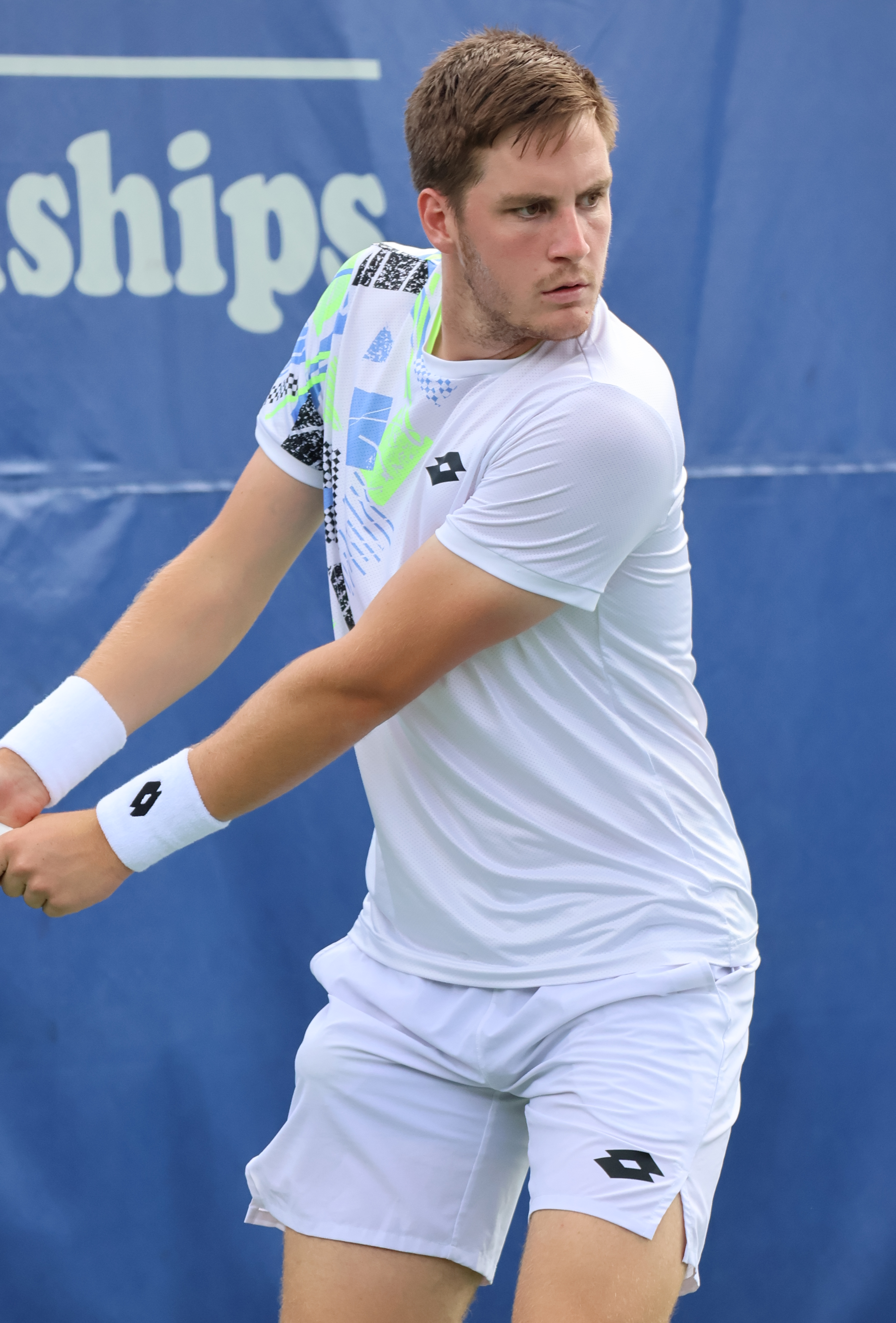
Henry Patten was part of the winning men's doubles team.

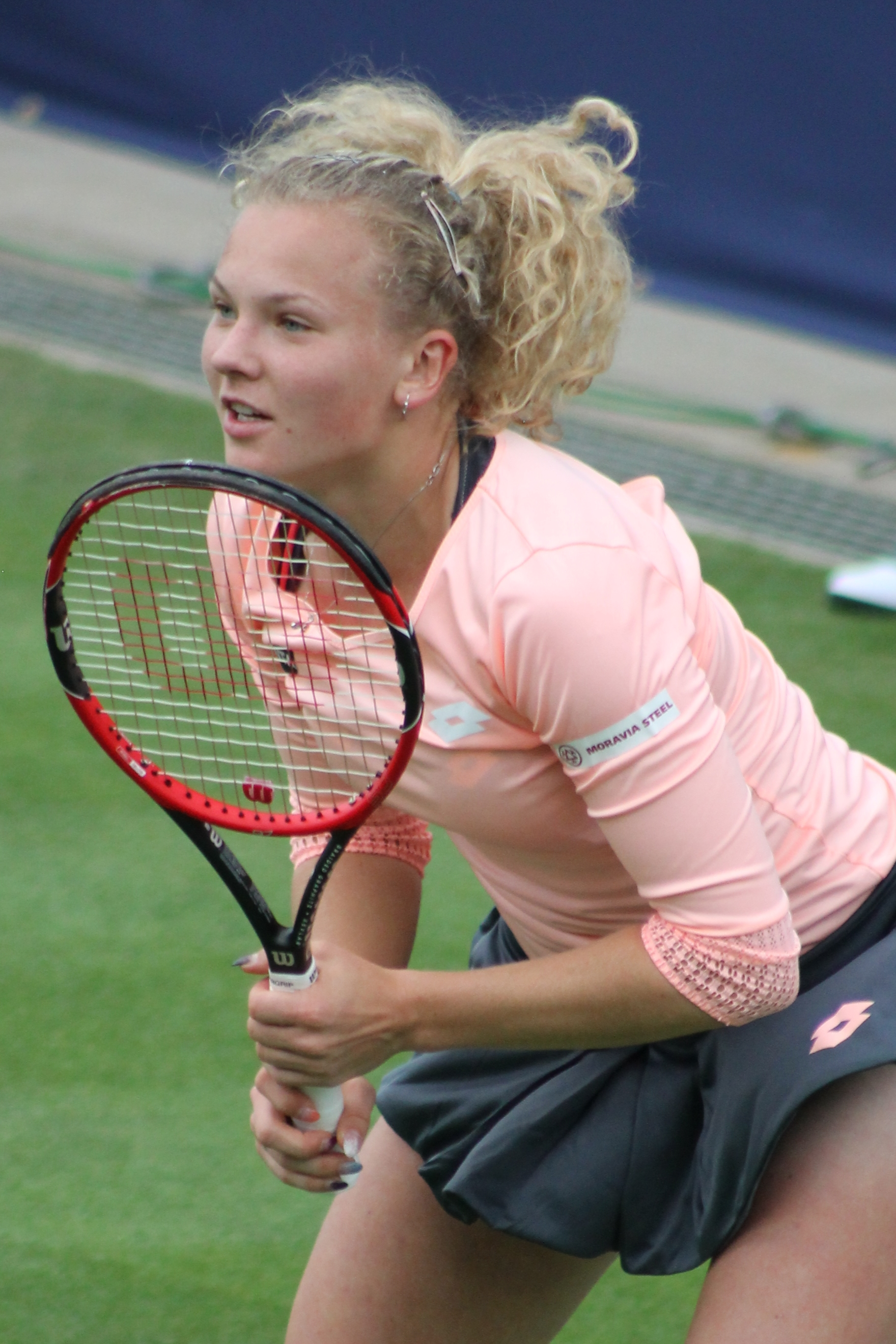
Kateřina Siniaková was part of the winning women's doubles team.

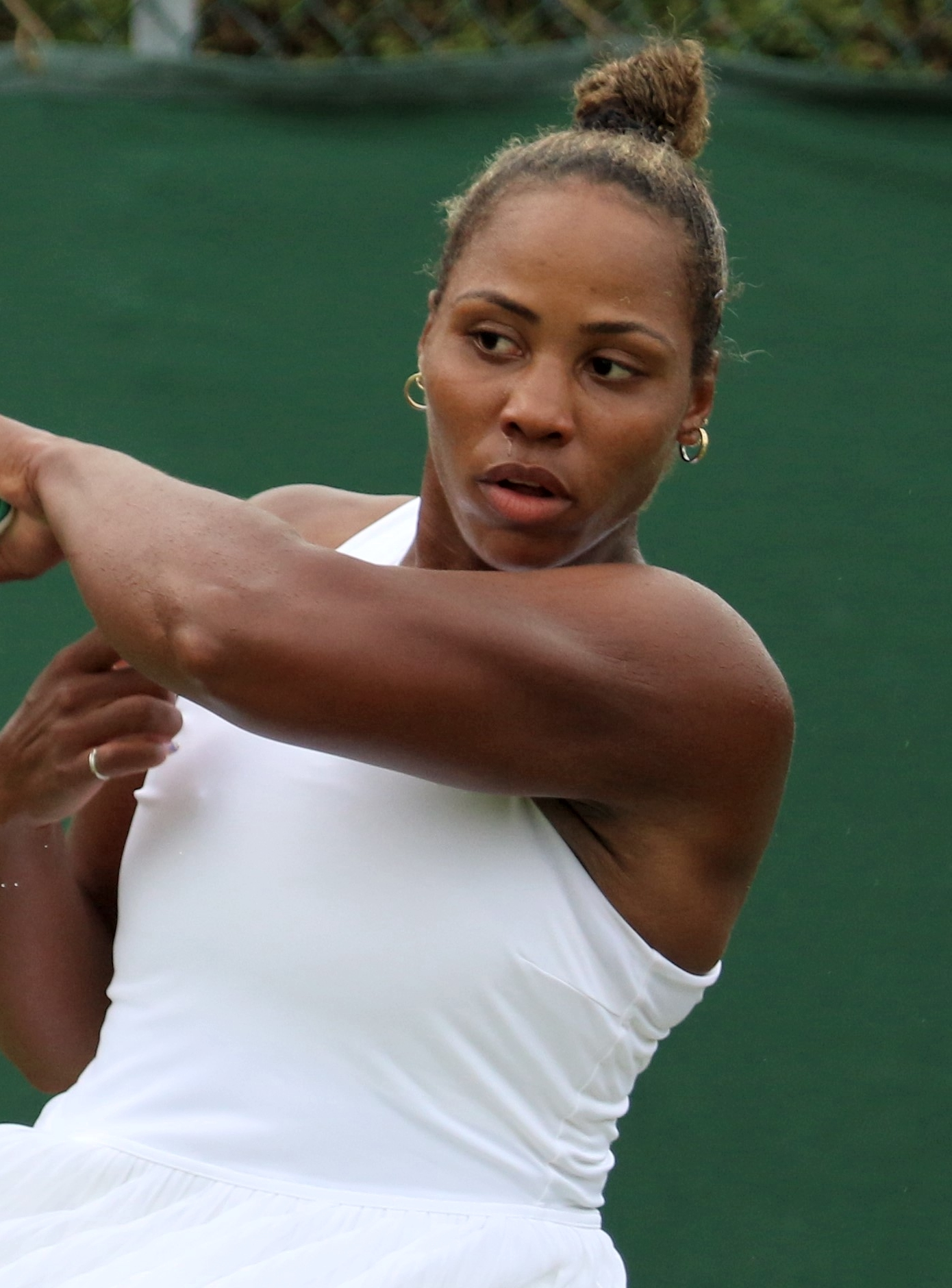
Taylor Townsend was part of the winning women's doubles team.

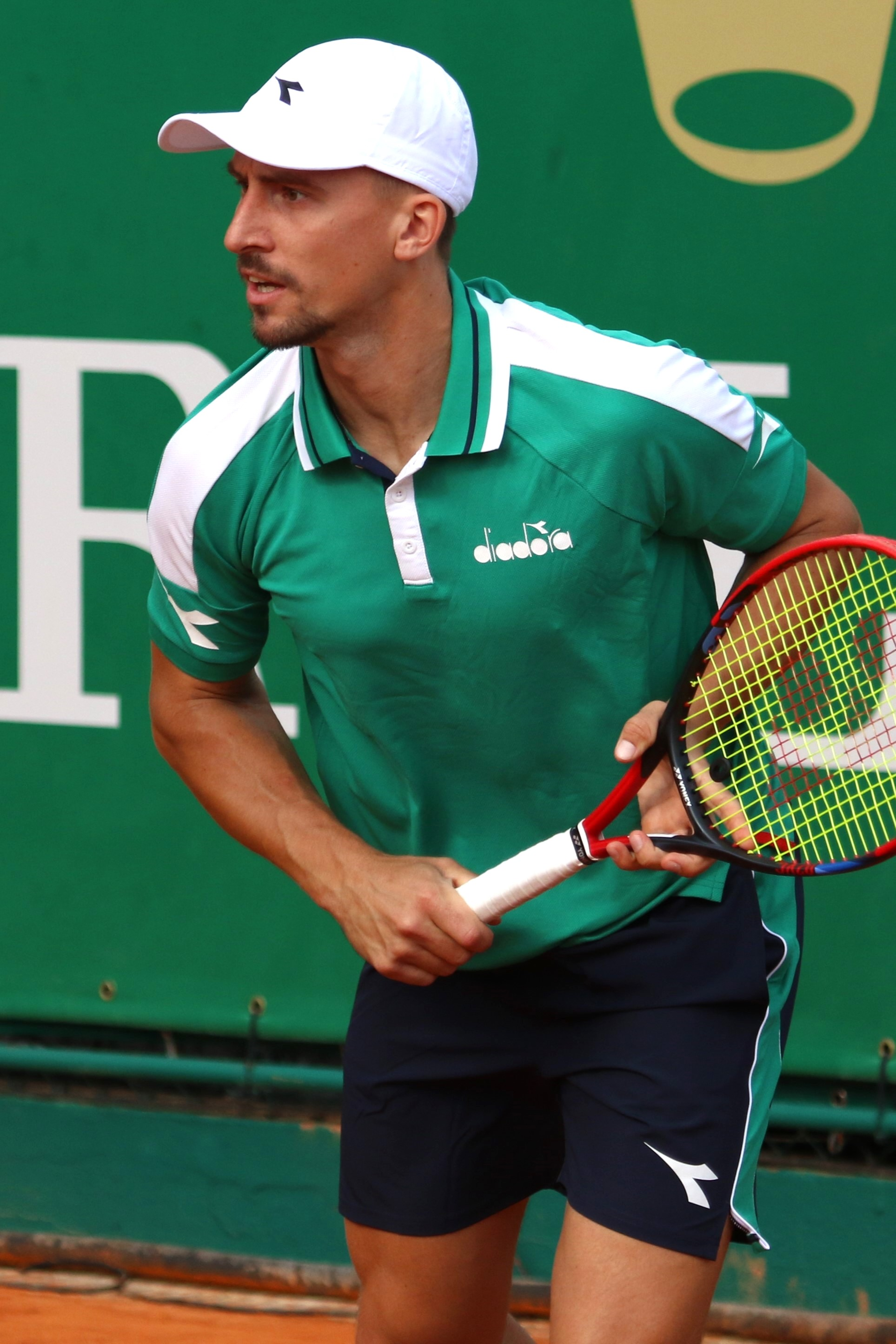
Jan Zieliński was part of the 2024 winning mixed doubles team.

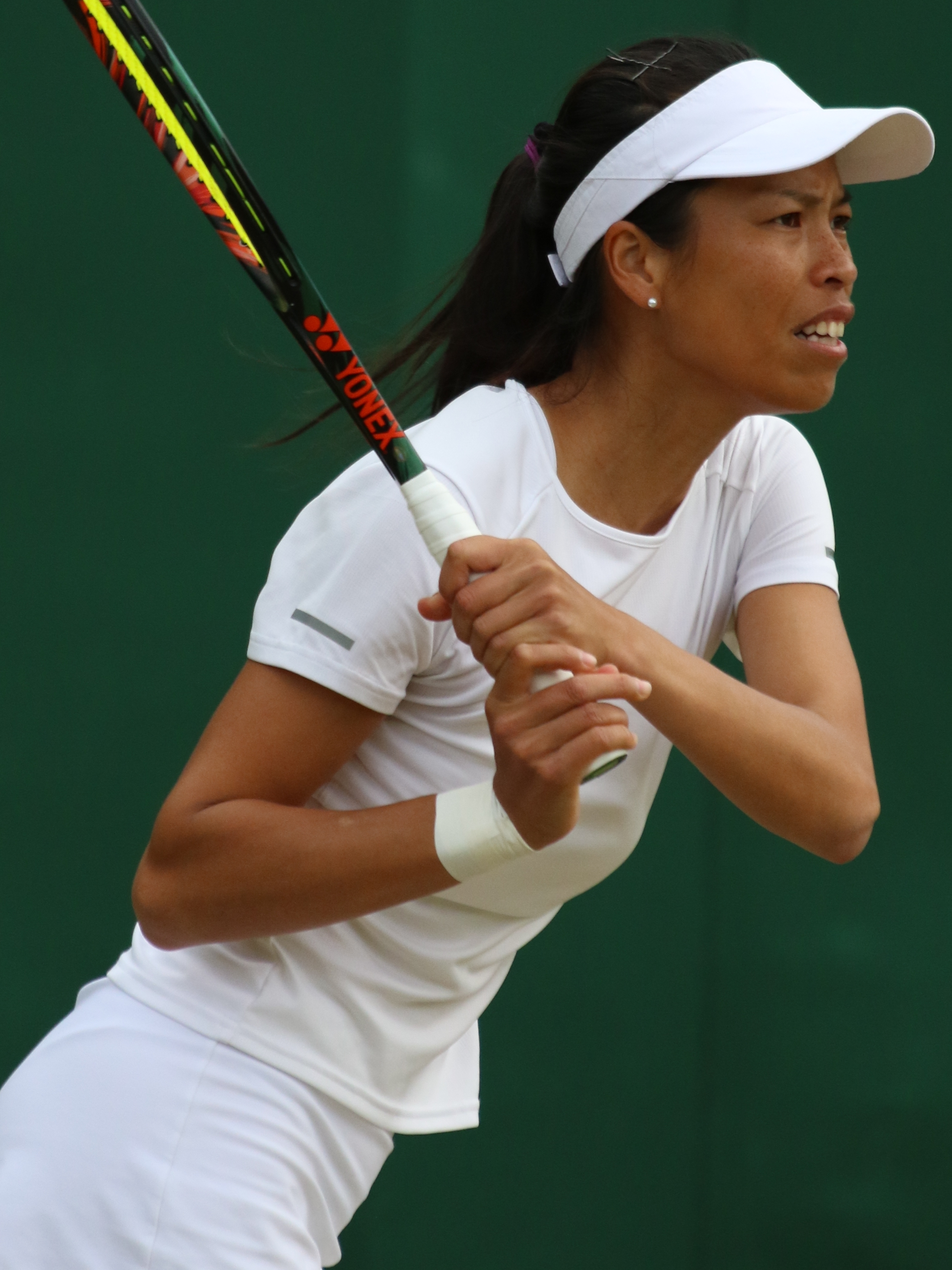
Hsieh Su-wei was part of the 2024 winning mixed doubles team.

== Point and prize money distribution ==
=== Point distribution ===
Below are the tables with the point distribution for each phase of the tournament.

==== Senior points ====
Event	W	F	SF	QF	Round of 16	Round of 32	Round of 64	Round of 128	Q	Q3	Q2	Q1
Men's singles	2000	1300	800	400	200	100	50	10	30	16	8	0
Men's doubles	2000	1200	720	360	180	90	0	N/A				
Women's singles	2000	1300	780	430	240	130	70	10	40	30	20	2
Women's doubles	2000	1300	780	430	240	130	10	N/A				

==== Wheelchair points ====
Event	W	F	SF	QF	Round of 16
Singles	800	500	375	200	100
Doubles	800	500	375	100	N/A
Quad singles	800	500	375	200	100
Quad doubles	800	500	375	100	N/A

==== Junior points ====
Event	W	F	SF	QF	Round of 16	Round of 32	Q	Q3
Boys' singles	1000	600	370	200	100	45	30	20
Girls' singles	1000	600	370	200	100	45	30	20
Boys' doubles	750	450	275	150	75	—N/a	—N/a	—N/a
Girls' doubles	750	450	275	150	75	—N/a	—N/a	—N/a

=== Prize money ===
The Wimbledon Championships total prize money for 2024 is £50,000,000, an increase of 11.86% from the 2023 edition.

Event	W	F	SF	QF	Round of 16	Round of 32	Round of 64	Round of 128^{1}	Q3	Q2	Q1
Singles	£2,700,000	£1,400,000	£715,000	£375,000	£226,000	£143,000	£93,000	£60,000	£40,000	£25,000	£15,000
Doubles *	£650,000	£330,000	£167,000	£84,000	£42,000	£25,000	£15,750	—N/a	—N/a	—N/a	—N/a
Mixed doubles *	£130,000	£65,000	£33,000	£17,000	£8,500	£4,250	—N/a	—N/a	—N/a	—N/a	—N/a
Wheelchair singles	£65,000	£34,000	£23,000	£15,500	£10,000	—N/a	—N/a	—N/a	—N/a	—N/a	—N/a
Wheelchair doubles *	£28,000	£14,000	£8,500	£5,250	—N/a	—N/a	—N/a	—N/a	—N/a	—N/a	—N/a
Quad singles	£65,000	£34,000	£23,000	£15,500	—N/a	—N/a	—N/a	—N/a	—N/a	—N/a	—N/a
Quad doubles *	£28,000	£14,000	£8,500	—N/a	—N/a	—N/a	—N/a	—N/a	—N/a	—N/a	—N/a

*per team

Preceded by 2023 Wimbledon Championships	Wimbledon Championships	Succeeded by 2025 Wimbledon Championships
Preceded by 2024 French Open	Grand Slam events	Succeeded by 2024 US Open
