= Jordan Lee (tennis) =

American tennis player (born 2010)

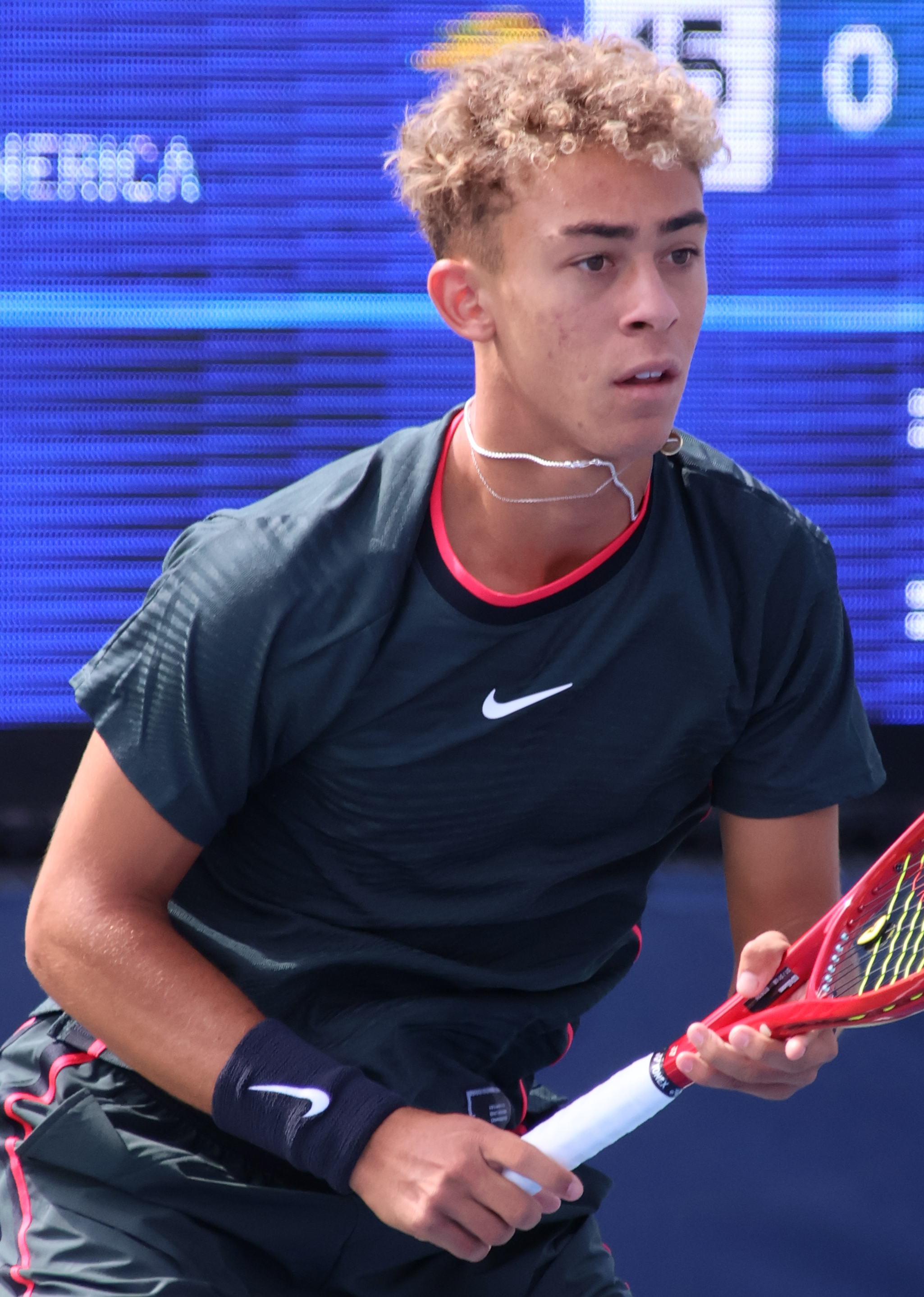
- Lee at the 2026 US Open
- Country (sports): United States
- Born: May 4, 2010 (age 16) Orlando, Florida, US
- Height: 5 ft 11 in (1.80 m)
- Plays: Right-handed (two-handed backhand)
- Coach: Felipe Mantilla
- Prize money: US $55,445

Singles
- Career record: 0–0 (at ATP Tour level, Grand Slam level, and in Davis Cup)
- Career titles: 0
- Highest ranking: No. 1,176 (October 26, 2026)
- Current ranking: No. 1,176 (October 26, 2026)

Grand Slam singles results
- US Open: Q2 (2026)
- Wimbledon Junior: W (2026)
- US Open Junior: QF (2026)

Doubles
- Career record: 0–0 (at ATP Tour level, Grand Slam level, and in Davis Cup)
- Career titles: 0
- Highest ranking: No. 951 (October 19, 2026)
- Current ranking: No. 954 (October 26, 2026)

Grand Slam doubles results
- Wimbledon Junior: 2R (2026)
- US Open Junior: 1R (2026)
- Last updated on: October 26, 2026.

Jordan Lee (born May 4, 2010) is an American tennis player. He has a career-high ATP singles ranking of No. 1,176 and a doubles ranking of No. 951 achieved in October 2026.

Lee reached an ITF Junior combined ranking of No. 2 on 26 October 2026.

== Career ==
Lee is coached in Orlando, Florida by his mother, Tina Lee, who is the head professional of the High Performance Academy at the USTA National Campus. In 2024, Lee was runner-up at the U14 Wimbledon Championships and won in his age-group that year at the Junior Orange Bowl and Eddie Her International tennis championships. He was part of the USA team that won the 2024 ITF World Junior Tennis Finals in Prostejov, Czechia.

In 2025, Lee competed as the United States won the Junior Davis Cup alongside Andrew Johnson and Michael Antonius. That year, Lee became one of the first players born in 2010 to earn ATP ranking points when he won his opening match playing as a wildcard against Matthew Thompson at the M15 event in Orlando. At the end of 2025 he won his first J300 tournament, winning in Bradenton after defeating Daniel Jade, Thijs Boogaard and Dimitar Kisimov in the final a year after winning the U16 tournament at the event.

Lee made a winning junior boys' singles grand slam debut at the 2026 Wimbledon Championships, despite having to come through qualifying and being the youngest player in the draw at the age of 16 years. He was the first qualifier to win the title since American Noah Rubin in 2014. Lee defeated Indian Arnav Vijay Paparkar in the quarterfinals before facing Vincent Reisach of Germany in the semi-final. In the final he faced Australian Cruz Hewitt, winning in three sets. At the 2026 US Open he reached the quarterfinals of the boys' singles before losing to Guto Miguel of Brazil in a close match in which he had three match points.

== Personal life ==
Speaking about his physical resemblance to soccer player Lamine Yamal, Lee said "He is one of my favourite football players, so that is pretty cool. My main goal, however, is to be compared because of how good we are at what we do, not because of looks. He is pretty unreal at what he does, and I am trying to be the same”. Lee was born to a Slovak mother, Tina Lee (née Strussová), who grew up playing tennis at Slovan Bratislava in Bratislava before moving to the United States on a college tennis scholarship, where she later settled and became a coach. Lee speaks fluent Slovak and regularly spends time with his grandparents in Bratislava, visiting Slovakia with his family at least once a year. He has a brother, Noah.

== Junior Grand Slam finals ==
=== Singles: 1 (title) ===
Result	Year	Tournament	Surface	Opponent	Score
Win	2026	Wimbledon	Grass	(Australia) Cruz Hewitt	4–6, 6–4, 7–5
