= 2024 Wimbledon Championships – Girls' 14&U singles =

Girls' 14&U singles
- 2024 Wimbledon Championships

Final
- Champion: (Czech Republic) Jana Kovačková
- Runner-up: (Latvia) Keisija Bērziņa
- Score: 5–7, 6–3, [10–2]

Events
Singles	men	women		boys	girls
Doubles	men	women	mixed	boys	girls
WC Singles	men	women	quad
WC Doubles	men	women	quad
14&U Singles	boys	girls
Legends	men	women	mixed
- Wimbledon Championships

It was the third edition of this discipline. Serbia's Luna Vujović was the reigning champion, but chose not to participate in the tournament. She did not return to play in the girls' singles event either. Czechia's Jana Kovačková won the title, defeating Keisija Bērziņa from Latvia 5–7, 6–3, [10–2] in the final.

== Format ==
The first phase of the tournament saw four round-robin groups compete. The winners of each group advanced to the semi-finals. The rest competed in a consolation play-off tournament.

== Draw ==
=== Final ===
Semifinals
A1	(Czech Republic) Jana Kovačková	2	6	[10]
C2	(United Kingdom) Megan Knight	6	3	[8]
D1	(Latvia) Keisija Bērziņa	6	6
B1	(China) Sun Xinran	2	4

Final
A1	(Czech Republic) Jana Kovačková	5	6	[10]
D1	(Latvia) Keisija Bērziņa	7	3	[2]

=== Group A ===
		(Czech Republic) Kovačková	(United States) Sohns	(United Kingdom) Britton	(Paraguay) Doldán	RR; W–L	Set; W–L	Game; W–L	Standings
A1	(Czech Republic) Jana Kovačková		6–1, 7–6^{(7–5)}	6–2, 6–3	6–3, 6–3	3–0	6–0	37–18	1
A2	(United States) Margaret Sohns	1–6, 6–7^{(5–7)}		2–6, 6–4, [6–10]	6–4, 6–0	1–2	3–4	27–28	3
A3	(United Kingdom) Daniella Britton	2–6, 3–6	6–2, 4–6, [10–6]		6–3, 6–4	2–1	4–3	28–27	2
A4	(Paraguay) Zoe Doldán	3–6, 3–6	4–6, 0–6	3–6, 4–6		0–3	0–6	17–36	4

=== Group B ===
		(China) Sun	(United States) Kotseva	(United Kingdom) Zingg	(Australia) Russell	RR; W–L	Set; W–L	Game; W–L	Standings
B1	(China) Sun Xinran		6–3, 6–3	6–2, 6–0	6–0, 6–0	3–0	6–0	36–8	1
B2	(United States) Raya Kotseva	3–6, 3–6		6–3, 6–2	6–2, 6–2	2–1	4–2	30–21	2
B3	(United Kingdom) Liv Zingg	2–6, 0–6	3–6, 2–6		6–1, 6–3	1–2	2–4	19–28	3
B4	(Australia) Tori Russell	0–6, 0–6	2–6, 2–6	1–6, 3–6		0–3	0–6	8–36	4

=== Group C ===
		(United States) Newman	(United Kingdom) Knight	(Venezuela) Chacón	(China) Zhang	RR; W–L	Set; W–L	Game; W–L	Standings
C1	(United States) Welles Newman		6–3, 3–6, [5–10]	6–0, 6–0	6–2, 6–4	2–1	5–2	33–16	2
C2	(United Kingdom) Megan Knight	3–6, 6–3, [10–5]		6–1, 6–0	6–2, 6–0	3–0	6–1	34–12	1
C3	(Venezuela) Claudia Chacón	0–6, 0–6	1–6, 0–6		2–6, 0–6	0–3	0–6	3–36	4
C4	(China) Zhang Sijia	2–6, 4–6	2–6, 0–6	6–2, 6–0		1–2	2–4	20–26	3

=== Group D ===
		(Latvia) Bērziņa	(South Korea) Hong	(Saudi Arabia) Minhas	(Canada) Geng	RR; W–L	Set; W–L	Game; W–L	Standings
D1	(Latvia) Keisija Bērziņa		7–6^{(7–0)}, 6–1	6–4, 6–2	0–6, 6–3, [10–6]	3–0	6–1	32–22	1
D2	(South Korea) Hong Ye-ri	6–7^{(0–7)}, 1–6		6–4, 6–1	6–7^{(3–7)}, 6–4, [7–7], ret.	2–1	4–3	31–29	2
D3	(Saudi Arabia) Haniya Minhas	4–6, 2–6	4–6, 1–6		w/o	1–2	0–4	11–24	3
D4	(Canada) Joyce Geng	6–0, 3–6, [6–10]	7–6^{(7–3)}, 4–6, [7–7], ret.	w/o		0–3	2–4	20–19	4

Standings are determined by: 1. number of wins; 2. number of matches played; 3. in two-players-ties, head-to-head records; 4. in three-players-ties, percentage of sets won, then percentage of games won.

=== Consolation Playoffs ===
First round
C1	(United States) Welles Newman	5	3
B2	(United States) Raya Kotseva	7	6
A3	(United Kingdom) Daniella Britton	6	6
D2	(South Korea) Hong Ye-ri	1	3

Second round
B2	(United States) Raya Kotseva	3	4
A3	(United Kingdom) Daniella Britton	6	6

First round
A2	(United States) Margaret Sohns	4	0
C4	(China) Zhang Sijia	6	6
D3	(Saudi Arabia) Haniya Minhas	6^{3}	6	[10]
B3	(United Kingdom) Liv Zingg	7^{7}	3	[8]

Second round
C4	(China) Zhang Sijia	6	7^{7}
D3	(Saudi Arabia) Haniya Minhas	2	6^{1}

First round
D4	(Canada) Joyce Geng
A4	(Paraguay) Zoe Doldán	w/o
C3	(Venezuela) Claudia Chacón	3	3
B4	(Australia) Tori Russell	6	6

Second round
A4	(Paraguay) Zoe Doldán	4	6	[4]
B4	(Australia) Tori Russell	6	3	[10]
