= Slovan Bratislava =

Slovan Bratislava is a name for multiple sport clubs based in Bratislava, Slovakia

- BC Slovan Bratislava (men's basketball)
- BK Slovan Bratislava (women's basketball)
- HC Slovan Bratislava (ice hockey)
- VK Slovan Bratislava (volleyball)
- ŠK Slovan Bratislava (men's football)
- ŠK Slovan Bratislava (women) (women's football)
