= 2024 Wimbledon Championships – Boys' 14&U singles =

Boys' 14&U singles
- 2024 Wimbledon Championships

Final
- Champion: (Japan) Takahiro Kawaguchi
- Runner-up: (United States) Jordan Lee
- Score: 6–2, 6–2

Events
| Singles | men | women | | boys | girls |
| Doubles | men | women | mixed | boys | girls |
| WC Singles | men | women | quad |
| WC Doubles | men | women | quad |
| 14&U Singles | boys | girls |
| Legends | men | women | mixed |
- Wimbledon Championships

It was the third edition of this discipline. Japanese Takahiro Kawaguchi defeated Jordan Lee from the United States 6–2, 6–2 in the final.

Great Britain's Mark Ceban was the reigning champion, but was no longer eligible to participate in the tournament. He received a wildcard into the boys' singles event, where he lost in the quarterfinals to Czech Maxim Mrva.

== Format ==
The first phase of the tournament saw four round-robin groups compete. The winners of each group advanced to the semi-finals. The rest competed in a consolation play-off tournament.

== Draw ==
=== Final ===
Semifinals
A4 | (Japan) Takahiro Kawaguchi | 7^{10} | 6
D1 | (Netherlands) Stan Put | 6^{8} | 4
C1 | (United States) Jordan Lee | 6 | 6
B3 | (South Korea) Dongjae Kim | 3 | 1

Final
A4 | (Japan) Takahiro Kawaguchi | 6 | 6
C1 | (United States) Jordan Lee | 2 | 2

=== Group A ===
| | | (United States) Antonius | (United Kingdom) Pickerd-Barua | (Brazil) De Carvalho Damazio | (Japan) Kawaguchi | RR; W–L | Set; W–L | Game; W–L | Standings |
| A1 | (United States) Michael Antonius | | 6–3, 6–2 | 6–4, 6–0 | 1–6, 2–6 | 2–1 | 4–2 | 27–21 | 2 |
| A2 | (United Kingdom) Niall Pickerd-Barua | 3–6, 2–6 | | 3–6, 3–6 | 2–6, 2–6 | 0–3 | 0–6 | 15–36 | 4 |
| A3 | (Brazil) Livas Eduardo De Carvalho Damazio | 4–6, 0–6 | 6–3, 6–3 | | 2–6, 6–7^{(7–9)} | 1–2 | 2–4 | 24–31 | 3 |
| A4 | (Japan) Takahiro Kawaguchi | 6–1, 6–2 | 6–2, 6–2 | 6–2, 7–6^{(9–7)} | | 3–0 | 6–0 | 37–15 | 1 |

=== Group B ===
| | | (United Kingdom) Lorimer | (Germany) Nagel-Heyer | (South Korea) Kim | (China) Qi | RR; W–L | Set; W–L | Game; W–L | Standings |
| B1 | (United Kingdom) Eric Lorimer | | 6–4 6–1 | 6–7^{(2–7)}, 7–5, [8–10] | 6–7^{(5–7)}, 6–4, [10–7] | 2–1 | 5–3 | 38–29 | 2 |
| B2 | (Germany) Johann Nagel-Heyer | 4–6, 1–6 | | 3–6, 2–6 | 6–7^{(3–7)}, 4–6 | 0–3 | 0–6 | 20–37 | 4 |
| B3 | (South Korea) Dongjae Kim | 7–6^{(7–2)}, 5–7, [10–8] | 6–3, 6–2 | | 7–5, 2–6, [11–9] | 3–0 | 6–2 | 35–29 | 1 |
| B4 | (China) Hongjin Qi | 7–6^{(7–5)}, 4–6, [7–10] | 7–6^{(7–3)}, 6–4 | 5–7, 6–2, [9–11] | | 1–2 | 4–4 | 35–33 | 3 |

=== Group C ===
| | | (United States) Lee | (Indonesia) Da Costa | (United Kingdom) Selvaraasan | (Australia) Takizawa | RR; W–L | Set; W–L | Game; W–L | Standings |
| C1 | (United States) Jordan Lee | | 6–3, 6–1 | 6–2, 6–1 | 6–0, 6–4 | 3–0 | 6–0 | 36–11 | 1 |
| C2 | (Indonesia) Rafalentino Ali Da Costa | 3–6, 1–6 | | 6–2, 6–1 | 4–6, 6–3, [10–7] | 2–1 | 4–3 | 27–24 | 2 |
| C3 | (United Kingdom) Aran Selvaraasan | 2–6, 1–6 | 2–6, 1–6 | | 2–6, 3–6 | 0–3 | 0–6 | 11–36 | 4 |
| C4 | (Australia) Taiki Takizawa | 0–6, 4–6 | 6–4, 3–6, [7–10] | 6–2, 6–3 | | 1–2 | 3–4 | 25–28 | 3 |

=== Group D ===
| | | (Netherlands) Put | (Australia) Han | (United Kingdom) Watson | (Argentina) Luna | RR; W–L | Set; W–L | Game; W–L | Standings |
| D1 | (Netherlands) Stan Put | | 6–1, 7–5 | 7–5, 6–4 | 6–2, 6–0 | 3–0 | 6–0 | 38–17 | 1 |
| D2 | (Australia) Lusan Han | 1–6, 5–7 | | 4–6, 5–7 | 6–4, 6–2 | 1–2 | 2–4 | 27–32 | 3 |
| D3 | (United Kingdom) Scott Watson | 5–7, 4–6 | 6–4, 7–5 | | 6–1, 6–1 | 2–1 | 4–2 | 34–24 | 2 |
| D4 | (Argentina) Demian Agustín Luna | 2–6, 0–6 | 4–6, 2–6 | 1–6, 1–6 | | 0–3 | 0–6 | 10–36 | 4 |

Standings are determined by: 1. number of wins; 2. number of matches played; 3. in two-players-ties, head-to-head records; 4. in three-players-ties, percentage of sets won, then percentage of games won.

=== Consolation Playoffs ===
First round
A1 | (United Kingdom) Eric Lorimer | 3 | 6 | [7]
B1 | (United States) Michael Antonius | 6 | 3 | [10]
D3 | (United Kingdom) Scott Watson | 1 | 6 | [4]
C2 | (Indonesia) Rafalentino Ali Da Costa | 6 | 4 | [10]

Second round
B1 | (United States) Michael Antonius | 2 | 6 | [10]
C2 | (Indonesia) Rafalentino Ali Da Costa | 6 | 3 | [2]

First round
D2 | (Australia) Lusan Han | 3 | 7^{7} | [8]
C4 | (Australia) Taiki Takizawa | 6 | 6^{2} | [10]
B4 | (China) Hongjin Qi | 6 | 6
A3 | (Brazil) Livas Eduardo De Carvalho Damazio | 2 | 3

Second round
C4 | (Australia) Taiki Takizawa | 6 | 6
B4 | (China) Hongjin Qi | 3 | 2

First round
A2 | (United Kingdom) Niall Pickerd-Barua | 6 | 5 | [8]
B2 | (Germany) Johann Nagel-Heyer | 2 | 7 | [10]
C3 | (United Kingdom) Aran Selvaraasan | 7 | 6
D4 | (Argentina) Demian Agustín Luna | 5 | 1

Second round
B2 | (Germany) Johann Nagel-Heyer | 3 | 2
C3 | (United Kingdom) Aran Selvaraasan | 6 | 6
