= 2024 Grand Prix Hassan II =

- Date: 1–7 April
- Edition: 38th
- Category: 250 series
- Draw: 28S / 16D
- Prize money: €579,320
- Surface: Clay / outdoor
- Location: Marrakesh, Morocco
- Venue: Royal Tennis Club de Marrakech

Champions

Singles
- (Italy) Matteo Berrettini

Doubles
- (Finland) Harri Heliövaara / (United Kingdom) Henry Patten
- Grand Prix Hassan II

The 2024 Grand Prix Hassan II was a professional men's tennis tournament played in Marrakesh, Morocco on clay courts. It was the 38th edition of the tournament and was classified as an ATP Tour 250 event on the 2024 ATP Tour. It took place from 1 April until 7 April 2024.

== Champions ==
=== Singles ===
- (Italy) Matteo Berrettini def. (Spain) Roberto Carballés Baena, 7–5, 6–2

=== Doubles ===
- (Finland) Harri Heliövaara / (United Kingdom) Henry Patten def. (Austria) Alexander Erler / (Austria) Lucas Miedler, 3–6, 6–4, [10–4]

== Singles main draw entrants ==
=== Seeds ===
Country	Player	Rank^{†}	Seed
SRB	Laslo Djere	35	1
AUT	Sebastian Ofner	40	2
GBR	Dan Evans	43	3
ITA	Lorenzo Sonego	53	4
ARG	Facundo Díaz Acosta	55	5
KAZ	Alexander Shevchenko	58	6
ARG	Mariano Navone	59	7
ITA	Flavio Cobolli	63	8

^{†} Rankings are as of 18 March 2024

=== Other entrants ===
The following players received wildcards into the singles main draw:

- (Morocco) Elliot Benchetrit
- (Tunisia) Aziz Dougaz
- (Jordan) Abdullah Shelbayh

The following player received entry using a protected ranking:

- (Italy) Matteo Berrettini

The following players received entry from the qualifying draw:

- (Italy) Fabio Fognini
- (Italy) Matteo Gigante
- (Belgium) David Goffin
- (United States) Nicolas Moreno de Alboran

=== Withdrawals ===
- (Czech Republic) Tomáš Macháč → replaced by (France) Arthur Rinderknech
- (Australia) Christopher O'Connell → replaced by (France) Alexandre Müller
- (Brazil) Thiago Seyboth Wild → replaced by (India) Sumit Nagal
- (Chile) Alejandro Tabilo → replaced by (France) Corentin Moutet

== Doubles main draw entrants ==
=== Seeds ===
Country	Player	Country	Player	Rank^{1}	Seed
NED	Robin Haase	GER	Andreas Mies	73	1
AUT	Alexander Erler	AUT	Lucas Miedler	88	2
COL	Nicolás Barrientos	BRA	Rafael Matos	93	3
FIN	Harri Heliövaara	GBR	Henry Patten	101	4

- Rankings are as of 18 March 2024

=== Other entrants ===
The following pairs received wildcards into the doubles main draw:

- (Morocco) Elliot Benchetrit / (Tunisia) Aziz Dougaz
- (Morocco) Karim Bennani / (Morocco) Hamza Karmoussi

The following pair received entry as alternates:

- (India) Sumit Nagal / (Australia) Aleksandar Vukic

=== Withdrawals ===
- (Italy) Simone Bolelli / (Italy) Andrea Vavassori → replaced by (Netherlands) Bart Stevens / (Greece) Petros Tsitsipas
- (United Kingdom) Lloyd Glasspool / (Netherlands) Jean-Julien Rojer → replaced by (Italy) Marco Bortolotti / (Spain) Sergio Martos Gornés
- Pavel Kotov / (Chile) Alejandro Tabilo → replaced by (France) Hugo Gaston / Pavel Kotov
- (France) Alexandre Müller / (Kazakhstan) Alexander Shevchenko → replaced by (India) Sumit Nagal / (Australia) Aleksandar Vukic
