= 2025 Australian Open – Men's doubles =

Men's doubles
- 2025 Australian Open

Final
- Champions: (Finland) Harri Heliövaara (United Kingdom) Henry Patten
- Runners-up: (Italy) Simone Bolelli (Italy) Andrea Vavassori
- Score: 6–7^{(16–18)}, 7–6^{(7–5)}, 6–3

Details
- Draw: 64
- Seeds: 16

Events
Singles	men	women		boys	girls
Doubles	men	women	mixed	boys	girls
WC Singles	men	women	quad	boys	girls
WC Doubles	men	women	quad	boys	girls
- Australian Open

Harri Heliövaara and Henry Patten defeated Simone Bolelli and Andrea Vavassori in the final, 6–7^{(16–18)}, 7–6^{(7–5)}, 6–3 to win the men's doubles tennis title at the 2025 Australian Open. It was the second major title for both players.

Rohan Bopanna and Matthew Ebden were the defending champions, but chose not to participate together. Bopanna partnered Nicolás Barrientos, but lost to Pedro Martínez and Jaume Munar in the first round. This was also Bopanna's final Australian Open appearance. Ebden partnered Joran Vliegen, but lost to Austin Krajicek and Rajeev Ram in the first round.

Marcelo Arévalo and Mate Pavić retained the ATP No. 1 doubles ranking by reaching the quarterfinals. Nikola Mektić and Kevin Krawietz were also in contention for the top ranking at the beginning of the tournament. Jordan Thompson and the pair of Marcel Granollers and Horacio Zeballos would also have been in contention, but they withdrew from their first-round matches.

Jean-Julien Rojer was vying to complete the career Grand Slam, but he and his partner Adam Pavlásek lost to Martínez and Munar in the second round.

== Seeds ==
1. (El Salvador) Marcelo Arévalo / (Croatia) Mate Pavić (quarterfinals)
2. (Spain) Marcel Granollers / (Argentina) Horacio Zeballos (withdrew)
3. (Italy) Simone Bolelli / (Italy) Andrea Vavassori (final)
4. (Germany) Kevin Krawietz / (Germany) Tim Pütz (semifinals)
5. (Croatia) Nikola Mektić / (New Zealand) Michael Venus (first round)
6. (Finland) Harri Heliövaara / (United Kingdom) Henry Patten (champions)
7. (United States) Nathaniel Lammons / (United States) Jackson Withrow (second round)
8. (Argentina) Máximo González / (Argentina) Andrés Molteni (first round)
9. (Australia) Matthew Ebden / (Belgium) Joran Vliegen (first round)
10. (United Kingdom) Joe Salisbury / (United Kingdom) Neal Skupski (second round)
11. (United Kingdom) Julian Cash / (United Kingdom) Lloyd Glasspool (quarterfinals)
12. (United Kingdom) Jamie Murray / (Australia) John Peers (second round)
13. (Belgium) Sander Gillé / (Poland) Jan Zieliński (third round)
14. (Colombia) Nicolás Barrientos / (India) Rohan Bopanna (first round)
15. (Monaco) Hugo Nys / (France) Édouard Roger-Vasselin (quarterfinals)
16. (France) Sadio Doumbia / (France) Fabien Reboul (third round)

Click on the seed number of a player to go to their draw section.

== Draw ==
Key

- Q = Qualifier
- WC = Wild card
- LL = Lucky loser
- Alt = Alternate
- ITF = ITF entry
- PR = Protected ranking
- SR = Special ranking
- SE = Special exempt
- JE = Junior exempt
- JR = Junior Accelerator Programme entrant
- CO = College Accelerator Programme entrant
- NG = Next Gen Accelerator Program entrant
- w/o = Walkover
- r = Retired
- d = Defaulted

=== Finals ===
Quarterfinals
1	(El Salvador) Marcelo Arévalo (Croatia) Mate Pavić	4	6	3
(Sweden) André Göransson (Netherlands) Sem Verbeek	6	4	6
3	(Italy) Simone Bolelli (Italy) Andrea Vavassori	6	7^{7}
(Portugal) Nuno Borges (Portugal) Francisco Cabral	4	6^{4}
11	(United Kingdom) Julian Cash (United Kingdom) Lloyd Glasspool	6^{9}	6^{5}
4	(Germany) Kevin Krawietz (Germany) Tim Pütz	7^{11}	7^{7}
6	(Finland) Harri Heliövaara (United Kingdom) Henry Patten	6	7
15	(Monaco) Hugo Nys (France) Édouard Roger-Vasselin	3	5

Semifinals
(Sweden) André Göransson (Netherlands) Sem Verbeek	6	3	4
3	(Italy) Simone Bolelli (Italy) Andrea Vavassori	2	6	6
4	(Germany) Kevin Krawietz (Germany) Tim Pütz	4	6	6^{7}
6	(Finland) Harri Heliövaara (United Kingdom) Henry Patten	6	3	7^{10}

Final
3	(Italy) Simone Bolelli (Italy) Andrea Vavassori	7^{18}	6^{5}	3
6	(Finland) Harri Heliövaara (United Kingdom) Henry Patten	6^{16}	7^{7}	6

=== Top half ===
==== Section 1 ====
First round
1	(El Salvador) M Arévalo (Croatia) M Pavić	6	6
WC	(Australia) R Hijikata (Australia) J Kubler	0	2
Alt	(Bosnia and Herzegovina) D Džumhur (Greece) Pe Tsitsipas	7^{7}	2	7^{10}
Alt	(India) A Chandrasekar (Poland) K Drzewiecki	6^{1}	6	6^{6}
PR	(Spain) P Carreño Busta (Spain) S Martos Gornés	7^{11}	2	4
(Netherlands) S Arends (United Kingdom) L Johnson	6^{9}	6	6
(Czech Republic) P Nouza (Czech Republic) P Rikl	5	6	3
16	(France) S Doumbia (France) F Reboul	7	2	6
10	(United Kingdom) J Salisbury (United Kingdom) N Skupski	7^{7}	6
(Argentina) S Báez (Argentina) F Comesaña	6^{1}	4
(Sweden) A Göransson (Netherlands) S Verbeek	6	6
(Austria) A Erler (Germany) A Mies	4	2
(Australia) J Duckworth (Australia) A Vukic	7	3
PR	(Australia) T Kokkinakis (Australia) N Kyrgios	5	2^{r}
WC	(Australia) L Saville (Australia) L Tu	6	6
8	(Argentina) M González (Argentina) A Molteni	3	4

Second round
1	(El Salvador) M Arévalo (Croatia) M Pavić	6	6
Alt	(Bosnia and Herzegovina) D Džumhur (Greece) Pe Tsitsipas	2	2
(Netherlands) S Arends (United Kingdom) L Johnson	6^{3}	6^{7}
16	(France) S Doumbia (France) F Reboul	7^{7}	7^{9}
10	(United Kingdom) J Salisbury (United Kingdom) N Skupski	2	4
(Sweden) A Göransson (Netherlands) S Verbeek	6	6
(Australia) J Duckworth (Australia) A Vukic	1	5
WC	(Australia) L Saville (Australia) L Tu	6	7

Third round
1	(El Salvador) M Arévalo (Croatia) M Pavić	6	7^{7}
16	(France) S Doumbia (France) F Reboul	4	6^{5}
(Sweden) A Göransson (Netherlands) S Verbeek	6	6
WC	(Australia) L Saville (Australia) L Tu	4	3

Quarterfinals
1	(El Salvador) M Arévalo (Croatia) M Pavić	4	6	3
(Sweden) A Göransson (Netherlands) S Verbeek	6	4	6

==== Section 2 ====
First round
3	(Italy) S Bolelli (Italy) A Vavassori	6	6
(Germany) C Frantzen (Germany) H Jebens	3	4
(Italy) M Bortolotti (Italy) F Cobolli	5	4
(Italy) L Darderi (Ecuador) D Hidalgo	7	6
(Czech Republic) A Pavlásek (Netherlands) J-J Rojer	6	6^{4}	6
(Monaco) R Arneodo (France) A Cazaux	3	7^{7}	4
(Spain) P Martínez (Spain) J Munar	7	7^{7}
14	(Colombia) N Barrientos (India) R Bopanna	5	6^{5}
12	(United Kingdom) J Murray (Australia) J Peers	6	6^{5}	6
PR	(Croatia) B Gojo (Serbia) M Kecmanović	3	7^{7}	3
(Netherlands) T Griekspoor (Netherlands) B van de Zandschulp	6	3	6
(Australia) C O'Connell; R Safiullin	4	6	3
(India) S Balaji (Mexico) MÁ Reyes-Varela	6	6
(Netherlands) R Haase (Kazakhstan) A Nedovyesov	4	3
(Portugal) N Borges (Portugal) F Cabral	7^{7}	6
5	(Croatia) N Mektić (New Zealand) M Venus	6^{3}	3

Second round
3	(Italy) S Bolelli (Italy) A Vavassori	7^{7}	7^{7}
(Italy) L Darderi (Ecuador) D Hidalgo	6^{3}	6^{4}
(Czech Republic) A Pavlásek (Netherlands) J-J Rojer	2	5
(Spain) P Martínez (Spain) J Munar	6	7
12	(United Kingdom) J Murray (Australia) J Peers	5	2
(Netherlands) T Griekspoor (Netherlands) B van de Zandschulp	7	6
(India) S Balaji (Mexico) MÁ Reyes-Varela	6^{1}	6	3
(Portugal) N Borges (Portugal) F Cabral	7^{7}	4	6

Third round
3	(Italy) S Bolelli (Italy) A Vavassori	6	7^{8}
(Spain) P Martínez (Spain) J Munar	3	6^{6}
(Netherlands) T Griekspoor (Netherlands) B van de Zandschulp	6^{5}	6	3
(Portugal) N Borges (Portugal) F Cabral	7^{7}	3	6

Quarterfinals
3	(Italy) S Bolelli (Italy) A Vavassori	6	7^{7}
(Portugal) N Borges (Portugal) F Cabral	4	6^{4}

=== Bottom half ===
==== Section 3 ====
First round
7	(United States) N Lammons (United States) J Withrow	4	7^{8}	7
(United States) M Giron (United States) E King	6	6^{6}	5
(Kazakhstan) A Bublik (Kazakhstan) A Shevchenko	4	1
(Uruguay) A Behar (United States) R Galloway	6	6
(Mexico) S González (Austria) L Miedler	1	6	6
WC	(Japan) S Watanabe (Japan) T Yuzuki	6	3	4
(Argentina) F Cerúndolo (Argentina) TM Etcheverry	6^{6}	2
11	(United Kingdom) J Cash (United Kingdom) L Glasspool	7^{8}	6
13	(Belgium) S Gillé (Poland) J Zieliński	6	6
(China) Y Bu (Spain) R Carballés Baena	1	2
(France) G Jacq (Brazil) O Luz	6	6
Alt	(India) J Nedunchezhiyan (India) VS Prashanth	2	2
PR	(United States) C Harrison (Netherlands) D Pel	4	6^{6}
(Romania) V Cornea (Argentina) M Navone	6	7^{8}
(Belgium) D Goffin (France) A Müller	3	1
4	(Germany) K Krawietz (Germany) T Pütz	6	6

Second round
7	(United States) N Lammons (United States) J Withrow	2	7^{7}	5
(Uruguay) A Behar (United States) R Galloway	6	6^{4}	7
(Mexico) S González (Austria) L Miedler	4	6	4
11	(United Kingdom) J Cash (United Kingdom) L Glasspool	6	4	6
13	(Belgium) S Gillé (Poland) J Zieliński	7^{7}	4	6
(France) G Jacq (Brazil) O Luz	6^{2}	6	3
(Romania) V Cornea (Argentina) M Navone	6	1	4
4	(Germany) K Krawietz (Germany) T Pütz	4	6	6

Third round
(Uruguay) A Behar (United States) R Galloway	3	6	6^{9}
11	(United Kingdom) J Cash (United Kingdom) L Glasspool	6	3	7^{11}
13	(Belgium) S Gillé (Poland) J Zieliński	7^{7}	4	4
4	(Germany) K Krawietz (Germany) T Pütz	6^{4}	6	6

Quarterfinals
11	(United Kingdom) J Cash (United Kingdom) L Glasspool	6^{9}	6^{5}
4	(Germany) K Krawietz (Germany) T Pütz	7^{11}	7^{7}

==== Section 4 ====
First round
6	(Finland) H Heliövaara (United Kingdom) H Patten	7^{7}	6
(India) RC Bollipalli (United States) R Seggerman	6^{5}	1
WC	(Australia) M Polmans (Australia) MC Romios	7^{7}	3	6
(France) M Guinard (France) A Rinderknech	6^{2}	6	3
(India) Y Bhambri (France) A Olivetti	2	6^{3}
WC	(Australia) T Schoolkate (Australia) A Walton	6	7^{7}
(United States) A Krajicek (United States) R Ram	6	6
9	(Australia) M Ebden (Belgium) J Vliegen	1	4
15	(Monaco) H Nys (France) É Roger-Vasselin	6	4	6
(Brazil) R Matos (Brazil) M Melo	3	6	2
(Croatia) I Dodig (Tunisia) S Mansouri	6	7
WC	(Australia) B Ellis (Australia) T Fancutt	2	5
(Czech Republic) T Macháč (China) Z Zhang	7	6
(Argentina) G Andreozzi (France) T Arribagé	5	4
(Germany) J Schnaitter (Germany) M Wallner	3	7	7^{10}
Alt	(Brazil) F Romboli (Brazil) M Zormann	6	5	6^{6}

Second round
6	(Finland) H Heliövaara (United Kingdom) H Patten	7^{7}	6
WC	(Australia) M Polmans (Australia) MC Romios	6^{2}	3
WC	(Australia) T Schoolkate (Australia) A Walton	2	4
(United States) A Krajicek (United States) R Ram	6	6
15	(Monaco) H Nys (France) É Roger-Vasselin	6^{4}	6	7
(Croatia) I Dodig (Tunisia) S Mansouri	7^{7}	3	5
(Czech Republic) T Macháč (China) Z Zhang	5	6	6
(Germany) J Schnaitter (Germany) M Wallner	7	4	4

Third round
6	(Finland) H Heliövaara (United Kingdom) H Patten	6	7^{8}
(United States) A Krajicek (United States) R Ram	3	6^{6}
15	(Monaco) H Nys (France) É Roger-Vasselin	6	3	6
(Czech Republic) T Macháč (China) Z Zhang	3	6	3

Quarterfinals
6	(Finland) H Heliövaara (United Kingdom) H Patten	6	7
15	(Monaco) H Nys (France) É Roger-Vasselin	3	5

=== Seeded teams ===
The following are the seeded teams. Seedings are based on ATP rankings as of 6 January 2025.

Country	Player	Country	Player	Rank	Seed
ESA	Marcelo Arévalo	CRO	Mate Pavić	2	1
~~ESP~~	~~Marcel Granollers~~	~~ARG~~	~~Horacio Zeballos~~	~~8~~	~~2~~
ITA	Simone Bolelli	ITA	Andrea Vavassori	17	3
GER	Kevin Krawietz	GER	Tim Pütz	21	4
CRO	Nikola Mektić	NZL	Michael Venus	23	5
FIN	Harri Heliövaara	GBR	Henry Patten	30	6
USA	Nathaniel Lammons	USA	Jackson Withrow	38	7
ARG	Máximo González	ARG	Andrés Molteni	43	8
AUS	Matthew Ebden	BEL	Joran Vliegen	48	9
GBR	Joe Salisbury	GBR	Neal Skupski	50	10
GBR	Julian Cash	GBR	Lloyd Glasspool	54	11
GBR	Jamie Murray	AUS	John Peers	61	12
BEL	Sander Gillé	POL	Jan Zieliński	62	13
COL	Nicolás Barrientos	IND	Rohan Bopanna	62	14
MON	Hugo Nys	FRA	Édouard Roger-Vasselin	64	15
FRA	Sadio Doumbia	FRA	Fabien Reboul	66	16

=== Other entry information ===
==== Wildcards ====
- (Australia) Blake Ellis / (Australia) Thomas Fancutt
- (Australia) Rinky Hijikata / (Australia) Jason Kubler
- (Australia) Marc Polmans / (Australia) Matthew Romios
- ~~(Canada) Vasek Pospisil / (Australia) Jordan Thompson~~
- (Australia) Luke Saville / (Australia) Li Tu
- (Australia) Tristan Schoolkate / (Australia) Adam Walton
- (Japan) Seita Watanabe / (Japan) Takeru Yuzuki

==== Protected ranking ====
- (Spain) Pablo Carreño Busta / (Spain) Sergio Martos Gornés
- (Croatia) Borna Gojo / (Serbia) Miomir Kecmanović
- (United States) Christian Harrison / (Netherlands) David Pel
- (Australia) Thanasi Kokkinakis / (Australia) Nick Kyrgios

==== Alternates ====
- (India) Anirudh Chandrasekar / (Poland) Karol Drzewiecki
- (Bosnia and Herzegovina) Damir Džumhur / (Greece) Petros Tsitsipas
- (India) Jeevan Nedunchezhiyan / (India) Vijay Sundar Prashanth
- (Brazil) Fernando Romboli / (Brazil) Marcelo Zormann

==== Withdrawals ====
- § (Ecuador) Gonzalo Escobar / (Australia) John-Patrick Smith → replaced by (India) Anirudh Chandrasekar / (Poland) Karol Drzewiecki
- § (Spain) Marcel Granollers / (Argentina) Horacio Zeballos → replaced by (Brazil) Fernando Romboli / (Brazil) Marcelo Zormann
- § (United Kingdom) Cameron Norrie / (United Kingdom) Marcus Willis → replaced by (Bosnia and Herzegovina) Damir Džumhur / (Greece) Petros Tsitsipas
- § (Canada) Vasek Pospisil / (Australia) Jordan Thompson → replaced by (India) Jeevan Nedunchezhiyan / (India) Vijay Sundar Prashanth
- ‡ (Australia) Max Purcell / (Australia) Jordan Thompson → replaced by (Croatia) Borna Gojo / (Serbia) Miomir Kecmanović
- ‡ (Greece) Petros Tsitsipas / (Greece) Stefanos Tsitsipas → replaced by (United States) Christian Harrison / (Netherlands) David Pel

‡ – withdrew from entry list
§ – withdrew from main draw
