= 2024 Grand Prix Hassan II – Singles =

Singles
- 2024 Grand Prix Hassan II

Final
- Champion: (Italy) Matteo Berrettini
- Runner-up: (Spain) Roberto Carballés Baena
- Score: 7–5, 6–2

Details
- Draw: 28 (4 Q / 3 WC )
- Seeds: 8

Events
| Singles | Doubles |
- Grand Prix Hassan II

Matteo Berrettini defeated the defending champion Roberto Carballés Baena in the final, 7–5, 6–2 to win the singles tennis title at the 2024 Grand Prix Hassan II. It was his first ATP Tour title in two years, and his eighth overall.

== Seeds ==
The top four seeds received a bye into the second round.

1. (Serbia) Laslo Djere (second round)
2. (Austria) Sebastian Ofner (second round)
3. (United Kingdom) Dan Evans (second round)
4. (Italy) Lorenzo Sonego (quarterfinals)
5. (Argentina) Facundo Díaz Acosta (first round)
6. (Kazakhstan) Alexander Shevchenko (first round)
7. (Argentina) Mariano Navone (semifinals)
8. (Italy) Flavio Cobolli (second round)

== Draw ==
Key

- Q = Qualifier
- WC = Wild card
- LL = Lucky loser
- Alt = Alternate
- ITF = ITF entry
- PR = Protected ranking
- SR = Special ranking
- SE = Special exempt
- JE = Junior exempt
- JR = Junior Accelerator Programme entrant
- CO = College Accelerator Programme entrant
- NG = Next Gen Accelerator Program entrant
- w/o = Walkover
- r = Retired
- d = Defaulted

=== Finals ===
Semifinals
Pavel Kotov | 4 | 2
(Spain) Roberto Carballés Baena | 6 | 6
PR | (Italy) Matteo Berrettini | 6^{4} | 6 | 6
7 | (Argentina) Mariano Navone | 7^{7} | 3 | 2

Final
(Spain) Roberto Carballés Baena | 5 | 2
PR | (Italy) Matteo Berrettini | 7 | 6

=== Top half ===
First round
Q | (Italy) F Fognini | 6^{4} | 6 | 6
(France) H Gaston | 7^{7} | 1 | 4
P Kotov | 7 | 6
WC | (Morocco) E Benchetrit | 5 | 3
WC | (Jordan) A Shelbayh | 1 | 4
8 | (Italy) F Cobolli | 6 | 6
Q | (Italy) M Gigante | 2 | 0^{r}
(Spain) R Carballés Baena | 6 | 2
Q | (Belgium) D Goffin | 6 | 6
(France) A Rinderknech | 4 | 4
Q | (United States) N Moreno de Alboran | 6 | 3 | 6
5 | (Argentina) F Díaz Acosta | 4 | 6 | 3

Second round
1 | (Serbia) L Djere | 6^{1} | 6 | 4
Q | (Italy) F Fognini | 7^{7} | 2 | 6
P Kotov | 6 | 7^{7}
8 | (Italy) F Cobolli | 1 | 6^{5}
3 | (United Kingdom) D Evans | 4 | 6^{3}
(Spain) R Carballés Baena | 6 | 7^{7}
Q | (Belgium) D Goffin | 3 | 4
Q | (United States) N Moreno de Alboran | 6 | 6

Quarterfinals
Q | (Italy) F Fognini | 1 | 2
P Kotov | 6 | 6
(Spain) R Carballés Baena | 6 | 4 | 6
Q | (United States) N Moreno de Alboran | 4 | 6 | 4

Semifinals
P Kotov | 4 | 2
(Spain) R Carballés Baena | 6 | 6

=== Bottom half ===
First round
6 | (Kazakhstan) A Shevchenko | 2 | 1
PR | (Italy) M Berrettini | 6 | 6
(France) L Van Assche | 6^{3} | 2
(Spain) J Munar | 7^{7} | 6
(France) C Moutet | 6 | 3 | 2
(India) S Nagal | 4 | 6 | 6
7 | (Argentina) M Navone | 6 | 6
WC | (Tunisia) A Dougaz | 3 | 2
(Spain) A Ramos Viñolas | 1 | 4
(Switzerland) S Wawrinka | 6 | 6
(Australia) A Vukic | 6 | 7^{7}
(France) A Müller | 3 | 6^{5}

Second round
PR | (Italy) M Berrettini | 6 | 4 | 6
(Spain) J Munar | 4 | 6 | 3
(India) S Nagal | 6 | 3 | 4
4 | (Italy) L Sonego | 1 | 6 | 6
7 | (Argentina) M Navone | 3 | 7 | 6
(Switzerland) S Wawrinka | 6 | 5 | 2
(Australia) A Vukic | 7^{13} | 2 | 7^{9}
2 | (Austria) S Ofner | 6^{11} | 6 | 6^{7}

Quarterfinals
PR | (Italy) M Berrettini | 6 | 7^{7}
4 | (Italy) L Sonego | 3 | 6^{5}
7 | (Argentina) M Navone | 6 | 6
(Australia) A Vukic | 2 | 4

Semifinals
PR | (Italy) M Berrettini | 6^{4} | 6 | 6
7 | (Argentina) M Navone | 7^{7} | 3 | 2

== Qualifying ==
=== Seeds ===
1. (Italy) Fabio Fognini (qualified)
2. (Belgium) David Goffin (qualified)
3. (France) Grégoire Barrère (qualifying competition)
4. (Italy) Matteo Gigante (qualified)
5. (Germany) Benjamin Hassan (qualifying competition)
6. (United States) Nicolas Moreno de Alboran (qualified)
7. (Italy) Stefano Napolitano (withdrew)
8. (Germany) Rudolf Molleker (qualifying competition)

=== Qualifiers ===
1. (Italy) Fabio Fognini
2. (Belgium) David Goffin
3. (United States) Nicolas Moreno de Alboran
4. (Italy) Matteo Gigante

=== Qualifying draw ===
==== First qualifier ====
First round
1 | (Italy) Fabio Fognini | 6 | 3 | 6
(France) Mathias Bourgue | 3 | 6 | 4
(France) Matteo Martineau | 6 | 4 | 6^{3}
Alt | (Austria) Lucas Miedler | 3 | 6 | 7^{7}

Qualifying competition
1 | (Italy) Fabio Fognini | 3 | 6 | 6
Alt | (Austria) Lucas Miedler | 6 | 3 | 2

==== Second qualifier ====
First round
2 | (Belgium) David Goffin | 7^{9} | 6
(France) Calvin Hemery | 6^{7} | 4
WC | (Morocco) Hamza Karmoussi | 3 | 4
5 | (Germany) Benjamin Hassan | 6 | 6

Qualifying competition
2 | (Belgium) David Goffin | 2 | 7^{10} | 6
5 | (Germany) Benjamin Hassan | 6 | 6^{8} | 3

==== Third qualifier ====
First round
3 | (France) Grégoire Barrère | 6 | 6
(France) Ugo Blanchet | 3 | 3
(Bulgaria) Dimitar Kuzmanov | 3 | 7^{11} | 2
6 | (United States) Nicolas Moreno de Alboran | 6 | 6^{9} | 6

Qualifying competition
3 | (France) Grégoire Barrère | 6^{6} | 6^{5}
6 | (United States) Nicolas Moreno de Alboran | 7^{8} | 7^{7}

==== Fourth qualifier ====
First round
4 | (Italy) Matteo Gigante | 4 | 6 | 6
WC | (Morocco) Karim Bennani | 6 | 4 | 1
(Norway) Viktor Durasovic | 1 | 3
8 | (Germany) Rudolf Molleker | 6 | 6

Qualifying competition
4 | (Italy) Matteo Gigante | 7^{7} | 0 | 7^{7}
8 | (Germany) Rudolf Molleker | 6^{5} | 6 | 6^{4}
