= 2026 Wimbledon Championships – Men's doubles =

Tennis championship

Men's doubles
- 2026 Wimbledon Championships

Final
- Champions: (Finland) Harri Heliövaara (United Kingdom) Henry Patten
- Runners-up: (El Salvador) Marcelo Arévalo (Croatia) Mate Pavić
- Score: 7–6^{(7–4)}, 7–6^{(7–3)}
- Date: 11 July 2026

Details
- Draw: 64
- Seeds: 16

Events
Singles	men	women		boys	girls
Doubles	men	women	mixed	boys	girls
WC Singles	men	women	quad
WC Doubles	men	women	quad
14&U Singles	boys	girls
Legends	men	women	mixed
- Wimbledon Championships

Harri Heliövaara and Henry Patten defeated Marcelo Arévalo and Mate Pavić in the final, 7–6^{(7–4)}, 7–6^{(7–3)} to win the gentlemen's doubles tennis title at the 2026 Wimbledon Championships. Patten became the first British player to win the title twice in the Open Era. He and Heliövaara retained the ATP No. 1 doubles ranking after Neal Skupski lost in the third round. Horacio Zeballos was also in contention for the top ranking at the beginning of the tournament.

Julian Cash and Lloyd Glasspool were the defending champions, but lost in the quarterfinals to Arévalo and Pavić.

== Seeds ==
1. (Finland) Harri Heliövaara / (United Kingdom) Henry Patten (champions)
2. (Spain) Marcel Granollers / (Argentina) Horacio Zeballos (second round)
3. (United Kingdom) Julian Cash / (United Kingdom) Lloyd Glasspool (quarterfinals)
4. (Italy) Simone Bolelli / (Italy) Andrea Vavassori (third round)
5. (United States) Christian Harrison / (United Kingdom) Neal Skupski (third round)
6. (El Salvador) Marcelo Arévalo / (Croatia) Mate Pavić (final)
7. (Germany) Kevin Krawietz / (Germany) Tim Pütz (semifinals)
8. (Argentina) Guido Andreozzi / (France) Manuel Guinard (quarterfinals)
9. (Monaco) Hugo Nys / (France) Édouard Roger-Vasselin (second round)
10. (France) Théo Arribagé / (France) Albano Olivetti (second round)
11. (Portugal) Francisco Cabral / (Austria) Lucas Miedler (third round)
12. (United States) Robert Cash / (United States) JJ Tracy (second round)
13. (France) Sadio Doumbia / (France) Fabien Reboul (quarterfinals)
14. (United States) Austin Krajicek / (Croatia) Nikola Mektić (quarterfinals)
15. (Netherlands) Sander Arends / (Netherlands) David Pel (first round)
16. (Germany) Jakob Schnaitter / (Germany) Mark Wallner (first round)

Click on the seed number of a player to go to their draw section.

== Draw ==
Key

- Q = Qualifier
- WC = Wild card
- LL = Lucky loser
- Alt = Alternate
- ITF = ITF entry
- PR = Protected ranking
- SR = Special ranking
- SE = Special exempt
- JE = Junior exempt
- JR = Junior Accelerator Programme entrant
- CO = College Accelerator Programme entrant
- NG = Next Gen Accelerator Program entrant
- w/o = Walkover
- r = Retired
- d = Defaulted

=== Finals ===
Quarterfinals
1	(Finland) Harri Heliövaara (United Kingdom) Henry Patten	2	6	7^{10}
8	(Argentina) Guido Andreozzi (France) Manuel Guinard	6	4	6^{6}
14	(United States) Austin Krajicek (Croatia) Nikola Mektić	6^{4}	3
Alt/PR	(Australia) Thanasi Kokkinakis (United States) Aleksandar Kovacevic	7^{7}	6
6	(El Salvador) Marcelo Arévalo (Croatia) Mate Pavić	6	7^{7}
3	(United Kingdom) Julian Cash (United Kingdom) Lloyd Glasspool	2	6^{2}
7	(Germany) Kevin Krawietz (Germany) Tim Pütz	7	7^{8}
13	(France) Sadio Doumbia (France) Fabien Reboul	5	6^{6}

Semifinals
1	(Finland) Harri Heliövaara (United Kingdom) Henry Patten	7^{7}	7^{10}
Alt/PR	(Australia) Thanasi Kokkinakis (United States) Aleksandar Kovacevic	6^{2}	6^{8}
6	(El Salvador) Marcelo Arévalo (Croatia) Mate Pavić	7^{10}	6
7	(Germany) Kevin Krawietz (Germany) Tim Pütz	6^{8}	2

Final
1	(Finland) Harri Heliövaara (United Kingdom) Henry Patten	7^{7}	7^{7}
6	(El Salvador) Marcelo Arévalo (Croatia) Mate Pavić	6^{4}	6^{3}

=== Top half ===
==== Section 1 ====
First round
1	(Finland) H Heliövaara (United Kingdom) H Patten	7	6
(France) T Atmane (France) L Sanchez	5	2
(France) Q Halys (France) P-H Herbert	2	4
(United States) M Kiger (United States) P Trhac	6	6
(Czech Republic) A Pavlásek (Czech Republic) P Rikl	6	6
(United States) M Giron (Chile) A Tabilo	2	2
(Australia) R Hijikata (Australia) M Polmans	7^{7}	6^{4}	7^{10}
16	(Germany) J Schnaitter (Germany) M Wallner	6^{1}	7^{7}	6^{7}
10	(France) T Arribagé (France) A Olivetti	6	6
(Brazil) O Luz (Brazil) R Matos	3	2
(Germany) C Frantzen (Netherlands) R Haase	4	6^{4}
(Chinese Taipei) R Ho (Germany) H Jebens	6	7^{7}
Alt	(Poland) K Drzewiecki (Poland) K Majchrzak	7	6^{9}	6^{8}
(Brazil) F Romboli (Australia) J-P Smith	5	7^{11}	7^{10}
(Spain) P Carreño Busta (Spain) J Munar	4	7^{8}	1
8	(Argentina) G Andreozzi (France) M Guinard	6	6^{6}	6

Second round
1	(Finland) H Heliövaara (United Kingdom) H Patten	7^{7}	6^{3}	7^{10}
(United States) M Kiger (United States) P Trhac	6^{5}	7^{7}	6^{7}
(Czech Republic) A Pavlásek (Czech Republic) P Rikl	6	6
(Australia) R Hijikata (Australia) M Polmans	3	4
10	(France) T Arribagé (France) A Olivetti	5	6^{4}
(Chinese Taipei) R Ho (Germany) H Jebens	7	7^{7}
(Brazil) F Romboli (Australia) J-P Smith	4	6^{2}
8	(Argentina) G Andreozzi (France) M Guinard	6	7^{7}

Third round
1	(Finland) H Heliövaara (United Kingdom) H Patten	5	6	7^{10}
(Czech Republic) A Pavlásek (Czech Republic) P Rikl	7	3	6^{6}
(Chinese Taipei) R Ho (Germany) H Jebens	6^{4}	4
8	(Argentina) G Andreozzi (France) M Guinard	7^{7}	6

Quarterfinals
1	(Finland) H Heliövaara (United Kingdom) H Patten	2	6	7^{10}
8	(Argentina) G Andreozzi (France) M Guinard	6	4	6^{6}

==== Section 2 ====
First round
4	(Italy) S Bolelli (Italy) A Vavassori	6	6
WC	(United Kingdom) B Jones (United Kingdom) J Paris	4	3
(Netherlands) J de Jong (France) V Royer	6	6
PR	(Kazakhstan) A Golubev (Kazakhstan) A Nedovyesov	3	4
Alt	I Liutarevich (Mexico) MÁ Reyes-Varela	6	6
Alt	(United States) B Kittay (Australia) M Romios	1	3
(Brazil) M Melo (Argentina) A Molteni	1	6	2
14	(United States) A Krajicek (Croatia) N Mektić	6	4	6
12	(United States) R Cash (United States) JJ Tracy	6	6
(Colombia) N Barrientos (Portugal) N Borges	3	4
(Argentina) M González (Mexico) S González	7	6^{7}	2
Alt/PR	(Australia) T Kokkinakis (United States) A Kovacevic	5	7^{9}	6
(Switzerland) J Paul (United States) R Seggerman	6	6
(United Kingdom) L Johnson (Poland) J Zieliński	4	4
(Argentina) TM Etcheverry (Argentina) M Kestelboim	7^{7}	3	4
5	(United States) C Harrison (United Kingdom) N Skupski	6^{3}	6	6

Second round
4	(Italy) S Bolelli (Italy) A Vavassori	6	6
(Netherlands) J de Jong (France) V Royer	1	4
Alt	I Liutarevich (Mexico) MÁ Reyes-Varela	7^{7}	6^{4}	6^{10}
14	(United States) A Krajicek (Croatia) N Mektić	6^{5}	7^{7}	7^{12}
12	(United States) R Cash (United States) JJ Tracy	6^{4}	3
Alt/PR	(Australia) T Kokkinakis (United States) A Kovacevic	7^{7}	6
(Switzerland) J Paul (United States) R Seggerman	6^{4}	6^{5}
5	(United States) C Harrison (United Kingdom) N Skupski	7^{7}	7^{7}

Third round
4	(Italy) S Bolelli (Italy) A Vavassori	6^{4}	6	4
14	(United States) A Krajicek (Croatia) N Mektić	7^{7}	4	6
Alt/PR	(Australia) T Kokkinakis (United States) A Kovacevic	7^{7}	7^{7}
5	(United States) C Harrison (United Kingdom) N Skupski	6^{4}	6^{5}

Quarterfinals
14	(United States) A Krajicek (Croatia) N Mektić	6^{4}	3
Alt/PR	(Australia) T Kokkinakis (United States) A Kovacevic	7^{7}	6

=== Bottom half ===
==== Section 3 ====
First round
6	(El Salvador) M Arévalo (Croatia) M Pavić	6	6
WC	(Kazakhstan) A Bublik (Australia) N Kyrgios	3	4
WC	(United Kingdom) D Stevenson (United Kingdom) M Willis	3	7^{8}	6
(Uruguay) A Behar (United Kingdom) J Salisbury	6	6^{6}	3
Alt	(Netherlands) J-J Rojer (United States) T Winegar	6	6
(India) Y Bhambri (New Zealand) M Venus	3	4
WC	(United Kingdom) D Evans (United Kingdom) H Searle	2	4
9	(Monaco) H Nys (France) É Roger-Vasselin	6	6
15	(Netherlands) S Arends (Netherlands) D Pel	4	4
(Netherlands) T Griekspoor (Netherlands) B van de Zandschulp	6	6
(Sweden) A Göransson (United States) E King	7^{9}	6^{7}	3
(Czech Republic) P Nouza (Austria) N Oberleitner	6^{7}	7^{9}	6
(France) C Moutet (France) A Reymond	6	1	6
WC	(United Kingdom) J Monday (United Kingdom) H Wendelken	3	6	1
(Argentina) M Navone (Paraguay) AD Vallejo	3	0
3	(United Kingdom) J Cash (United Kingdom) L Glasspool	6	6

Second round
6	(El Salvador) M Arévalo (Croatia) M Pavić	6	6^{4}	6
WC	(United Kingdom) D Stevenson (United Kingdom) M Willis	1	7^{7}	4
Alt	(Netherlands) J-J Rojer (United States) T Winegar	7	6^{5}	7^{10}
9	(Monaco) H Nys (France) É Roger-Vasselin	5	7^{7}	6^{6}
(Netherlands) T Griekspoor (Netherlands) B van de Zandschulp	1	2
(Czech Republic) P Nouza (Austria) N Oberleitner	6	6
(France) C Moutet (France) A Reymond	6	4	4
3	(United Kingdom) J Cash (United Kingdom) L Glasspool	4	6	6

Third round
6	(El Salvador) M Arévalo (Croatia) M Pavić	6^{5}	6	6
Alt	(Netherlands) J-J Rojer (United States) T Winegar	7^{7}	4	3
(Czech Republic) P Nouza (Austria) N Oberleitner	3	6	5
3	(United Kingdom) J Cash (United Kingdom) L Glasspool	6	3	7

Quarterfinals
6	(El Salvador) M Arévalo (Croatia) M Pavić	6	7^{7}
3	(United Kingdom) J Cash (United Kingdom) L Glasspool	2	6^{2}

==== Section 4 ====
First round
7	(Germany) K Krawietz (Germany) T Pütz	6	3	7^{11}
Alt	(Ecuador) G Escobar (United States) R Stalder	3	6	6^{9}
(Argentina) RA Burruchaga (Argentina) TA Tirante	w/o
(Belgium) R Collignon (Croatia) D Prižmić
(Peru) I Buse (Argentina) M Trungelliti	6	6^{3}	7^{10}
Alt	(India) A Chandrasekar (Japan) T Yuzuki	4	7^{7}	6^{7}
(Ecuador) D Hidalgo (Czech Republic) M Vocel	7^{7}	5	6^{2}
11	(Portugal) F Cabral (Austria) L Miedler	6^{4}	7	7^{10}
13	(France) S Doumbia (France) F Reboul	2	7	6
(United States) V Kirkov (Netherlands) B Stevens	6	5	3
(Germany) Y Hanfmann (Germany) J-L Struff
(Czech Republic) V Kopřiva (Poland) F Pieczonka	w/o
(India) S Balaji (Brazil) M Demoliner	6	6^{2}	4
(Belgium) S Gillé (Netherlands) S Verbeek	3	7^{7}	6
(United States) R Galloway (Australia) J Peers	6^{5}	3
2	(Spain) M Granollers (Argentina) H Zeballos	7^{7}	6

Second round
7	(Germany) K Krawietz (Germany) T Pütz	5	7^{7}	6
(Argentina) RA Burruchaga (Argentina) TA Tirante	7	6^{5}	3
(Peru) I Buse (Argentina) M Trungelliti	6	4	1
11	(Portugal) F Cabral (Austria) L Miedler	4	6	6
13	(France) S Doumbia (France) F Reboul	6	3	6
(Czech Republic) V Kopřiva (Poland) F Pieczonka	2	6	3
(Belgium) S Gillé (Netherlands) S Verbeek	6	7^{11}
2	(Spain) M Granollers (Argentina) H Zeballos	4	6^{9}

Third round
7	(Germany) K Krawietz (Germany) T Pütz	7^{7}	7^{9}
11	(Portugal) F Cabral (Austria) L Miedler	6^{3}	6^{7}
13	(France) S Doumbia (France) F Reboul	7^{7}	6
(Belgium) S Gillé (Netherlands) S Verbeek	6^{3}	2

Quarterfinals
7	(Germany) K Krawietz (Germany) T Pütz	7	7^{8}
13	(France) S Doumbia (France) F Reboul	5	6^{6}

== Seeded teams ==
The following are the seeded teams. Seedings are based on ATP rankings as of 22 June 2026.

Country	Player	Country	Player	Rank	Seed
FIN	Harri Heliövaara	GBR	Henry Patten	2	1
ESP	Marcel Granollers	ARG	Horacio Zeballos	7	2
GBR	Julian Cash	GBR	Lloyd Glasspool	12	3
ITA	Simone Bolelli	ITA	Andrea Vavassori	17	4
USA	Christian Harrison	GBR	Neal Skupski	19	5
ESA	Marcelo Arévalo	CRO	Mate Pavić	21	6
GER	Kevin Krawietz	GER	Tim Pütz	25	7
ARG	Guido Andreozzi	FRA	Manuel Guinard	33	8
MON	Hugo Nys	FRA	Édouard Roger-Vasselin	39	9
FRA	Théo Arribagé	FRA	Albano Olivetti	46	10
POR	Francisco Cabral	AUT	Lucas Miedler	49	11
USA	Robert Cash	USA	JJ Tracy	59	12
FRA	Sadio Doumbia	FRA	Fabien Reboul	61	13
USA	Austin Krajicek	CRO	Nikola Mektić	65	14
NED	Sander Arends	NED	David Pel	72	15
GER	Jakob Schnaitter	GER	Mark Wallner	72	16

== Other entry information ==
=== Wildcards ===
- (Kazakhstan) Alexander Bublik / (Australia) Nick Kyrgios
- (United Kingdom) Dan Evans / (United Kingdom) Henry Searle
- (United Kingdom) Ben Jones / (United Kingdom) Joshua Paris
- (United Kingdom) Johannus Monday / (United Kingdom) Harry Wendelken
- (United Kingdom) David Stevenson / (United Kingdom) Marcus Willis

=== Protected ranking ===
- (Kazakhstan) Andrey Golubev / (Kazakhstan) Aleksandr Nedovyesov
- (Australia) Thanasi Kokkinakis / (United States) Aleksandar Kovacevic

=== Alternates ===
- (India) Anirudh Chandrasekar / (Japan) Takeru Yuzuki
- (Poland) Karol Drzewiecki / (Poland) Kamil Majchrzak
- (Ecuador) Gonzalo Escobar / (United States) Reese Stalder
- (United States) Benjamin Kittay / (Australia) Matthew Romios
- (Australia) Thanasi Kokkinakis / (United States) Aleksandar Kovacevic
- Ivan Liutarevich / (Mexico) Miguel Ángel Reyes-Varela
- (Netherlands) Jean-Julien Rojer / (United States) Theodore Winegar

=== Withdrawals ===
- (Italy) Mattia Bellucci / (United States) Ethan Quinn → replaced by (Poland) Karol Drzewiecki / (Poland) Kamil Majchrzak
- (Belgium) Zizou Bergs / (Belgium) Alexander Blockx → replaced by (Ecuador) Gonzalo Escobar / (United States) Reese Stalder
- (France) Benjamin Bonzi / (France) Arthur Rinderknech → replaced by (United States) Benjamin Kittay / (Australia) Matthew Romios
- (Argentina) Francisco Cerúndolo / (Argentina) Juan Manuel Cerúndolo → replaced by (Australia) Thanasi Kokkinakis / (United States) Aleksandar Kovacevic
- (Belgium) Raphaël Collignon / (Croatia) Dino Prižmić → not replaced
- (Australia) James Duckworth / (Serbia) Miomir Kecmanović → replaced by Ivan Liutarevich / (Mexico) Miguel Ángel Reyes-Varela
- (Hungary) Márton Fucsovics / (Hungary) Fábián Marozsán → replaced by (India) Anirudh Chandrasekar / (Japan) Takeru Yuzuki
- (Germany) Yannick Hanfmann / (Germany) Jan-Lennard Struff → not replaced
- (Spain) Daniel Mérida / (Argentina) Camilo Ugo Carabelli → replaced by (Netherlands) Jean-Julien Rojer / (United States) Theodore Winegar
