= 2025 ATP Finals – Doubles =

Doubles
- 2025 ATP Finals

Final
- Champions: (Finland) Harri Heliövaara (United Kingdom) Henry Patten
- Runners-up: (United Kingdom) Joe Salisbury (United Kingdom) Neal Skupski
- Score: 7–5, 6–3

Details
- Draw: 8 (round robin + elimination)
- Seeds: 8

Events
| Singles | Doubles |
- ATP Finals

Harri Heliövaara and Henry Patten defeated Joe Salisbury and Neal Skupski in the final, 7–5, 6–3, to win the doubles title at the 2025 ATP Finals. Five British players reached the semifinals, marking the first time since 1992 that five players from one country reached the last four.

Lloyd Glasspool secured the individual year-end ATP No. 1 doubles ranking after Horacio Zeballos lost his second round-robin match. Julian Cash and Glasspool secured the year-end ATP No. 1 doubles team ranking by winning their second round-robin match, becoming the first all-British pair to achieve the feat.

Kevin Krawietz and Tim Pütz were the defending champions, but were eliminated in the round-robin stage. Mate Pavić was attempting to become the sixth man to complete the Career Super Slam in men's doubles, but he and his partner Marcelo Arévalo were also eliminated in the round-robin stage.

Cash, Christian Harrison and Evan King made their debuts in the doubles competition.

== Seeds ==
1. (United Kingdom) Julian Cash / (United Kingdom) Lloyd Glasspool (semifinals)
2. (Finland) Harri Heliövaara / (United Kingdom) Henry Patten (champions)
3. (Spain) Marcel Granollers / (Argentina) Horacio Zeballos (round robin)
4. (El Salvador) Marcelo Arévalo / (Croatia) Mate Pavić (round robin)
5. (United Kingdom) Joe Salisbury / (United Kingdom) Neal Skupski (final)
6. (Germany) Kevin Krawietz / (Germany) Tim Pütz (round robin)
7. (Italy) Simone Bolelli / (Italy) Andrea Vavassori (semifinals)
8. (United States) Christian Harrison / (United States) Evan King (round robin)

== Alternates ==
1. (Monaco) Hugo Nys / (France) Édouard Roger-Vasselin (did not play)
2. (France) Sadio Doumbia / (France) Fabien Reboul (did not play)

== Draw ==
Key

- Q = Qualifier
- WC = Wild card
- LL = Lucky loser
- Alt = Alternate
- ITF = ITF entry
- PR = Protected ranking
- SR = Special ranking
- SE = Special exempt
- JE = Junior exempt
- JR = Junior Accelerator Programme entrant
- CO = College Accelerator Programme entrant
- NG = Next Gen Accelerator Program entrant
- w/o = Walkover
- r = Retired
- d = Defaulted

=== Finals ===
Semifinals
7 | (Italy) Simone Bolelli (Italy) Andrea Vavassori | 4 | 3
2 | (Finland) Harri Heliövaara (United Kingdom) Henry Patten | 6 | 6
5 | (United Kingdom) Joe Salisbury (United Kingdom) Neal Skupski | 6^{3} | 6 | [10]
1 | (United Kingdom) Julian Cash (United Kingdom) Lloyd Glasspool | 7^{7} | 3 | [8]

Final
2 | (Finland) Harri Heliövaara (United Kingdom) Henry Patten | 7 | 6
5 | (United Kingdom) Joe Salisbury (United Kingdom) Neal Skupski | 5 | 3

=== Peter Fleming Group ===
| | | (United Kingdom) Cash (United Kingdom) Glasspool | (Spain) Granollers (Argentina) Zeballos | (Germany) Krawietz (Germany) Pütz | (Italy) Bolelli (Italy) Vavassori | RR; W–L | Set; W–L | Game; W–L | Standings |
| 1 | (United Kingdom) Julian Cash (United Kingdom) Lloyd Glasspool | | 6–3, 7–5 | 7–6^{(11–9)}, 6–2 | 5–7, 3–6 | 2–1 | 4–2 (67%) | 34–29 (54%) | 2 |
| 3 | (Spain) Marcel Granollers (Argentina) Horacio Zeballos | 3–6, 5–7 | | 6–4, 4–6, [10–6] | 6–7^{(4–7)}, 4–6 | 1–2 | 2–5 (29%) | 29–36 (45%) | 4 |
| 6 | (Germany) Kevin Krawietz (Germany) Tim Pütz | 6–7^{(9–11)}, 2–6 | 4–6, 6–4, [6–10] | | 7–6^{(7–5)}, 4–6, [13–11] | 1–2 | 3–5 (38%) | 30–36 (45%) | 3 |
| 7 | (Italy) Simone Bolelli (Italy) Andrea Vavassori | 7–5, 6–3 | 7–6^{(7–4)}, 6–4 | 6–7^{(5–7)}, 6–4, [11–13] | | 2–1 | 5–2 (71%) | 38–30 (56%) | 1 |

=== John McEnroe Group ===
| | | (Finland) Heliövaara (United Kingdom) Patten | (El Salvador) Arévalo (Croatia) Pavić | (United Kingdom) Salisbury (United Kingdom) Skupski | (United States) Harrison (United States) King | RR; W–L | Set; W–L | Game; W–L | Standings |
| 2 | (Finland) Harri Heliövaara (United Kingdom) Henry Patten | | 7–6^{(7–5)}, 6–2 | 6–7^{(7–9)}, 6–3, [7–10] | 6–4, 6–4 | 2–1 | 5–2 (71%) | 37–27 (58%) | 2 |
| 4 | (El Salvador) Marcelo Arévalo (Croatia) Mate Pavić | 6–7^{(5–7)}, 2–6 | | 3–6, 5–7 | 7–6^{(7–5)}, 6–7^{(2–7)}, [13–11] | 1–2 | 2–5 (29%) | 30–39 (43%) | 3 |
| 5 | (United Kingdom) Joe Salisbury (United Kingdom) Neal Skupski | 7–6^{(9–7)}, 3–6, [10–7] | 6–3, 7–5 | | 7–5, 6–3 | 3–0 | 6–1 (86%) | 37–28 (57%) | 1 |
| 8 | (United States) Christian Harrison (United States) Evan King | 4–6, 4–6 | 6–7^{(5–7)}, 7–6^{(7–2)}, [11–13] | 5–7, 3–6 | | 0–3 | 1–6 (14%) | 29–39 (43%) | 4 |

Standings are determined by: 1. number of wins; 2. number of matches; 3. in two-team ties, head-to-head records; 4. in three-team ties, (a) percentage of sets won (head-to-head records if two players remain tied), then (b) percentage of games won (head-to-head records if two players remain tied), then (c) ATP rankings.
