= 2024 Grand Prix Hassan II – Doubles =

Doubles
- 2024 Grand Prix Hassan II

Final
- Champions: (Finland) Harri Heliövaara (United Kingdom) Henry Patten
- Runners-up: (Austria) Alexander Erler (Austria) Lucas Miedler
- Score: 3–6, 6–4, [10–4]

Events
Singles	Doubles
- Grand Prix Hassan II

Harri Heliövaara and Henry Patten defeated Alexander Erler and Lucas Miedler in the final, 3–6, 6–4, [10–4] to win the doubles tennis title at the 2024 Grand Prix Hassan II.

Marcelo Demoliner and Andrea Vavassori were the reigning champions, but Vavassori chose not to compete this year and Demoliner chose to compete in Estoril instead.

== Seeds ==
1. (Netherlands) Robin Haase / (Germany) Andreas Mies (first round)
2. (Austria) Alexander Erler / (Austria) Lucas Miedler (final)
3. (Colombia) Nicolás Barrientos / (Brazil) Rafael Matos (quarterfinals)
4. (Finland) Harri Heliövaara / (United Kingdom) Henry Patten (champions)

== Draw ==
Key

- Q = Qualifier
- WC = Wild card
- LL = Lucky loser
- Alt = Alternate
- ITF = ITF entry
- PR = Protected ranking
- SR = Special ranking
- SE = Special exempt
- JE = Junior exempt
- JR = Junior Accelerator Programme entrant
- CO = College Accelerator Programme entrant
- NG = Next Gen Accelerator Program entrant
- w/o = Walkover
- r = Retired
- d = Defaulted

=== Draw ===
First round
1	(Netherlands) R Haase (Germany) A Mies	6	6^{4}	[8]
(Sweden) A Göransson (United States) R Stalder	1	7^{7}	[10]
(Argentina) G Andreozzi (Mexico) MÁ Reyes-Varela	6	6
WC	(Morocco) K Bennani (Morocco) H Karmoussi	3	3
4	(Finland) H Heliövaara (United Kingdom) H Patten	6	7^{7}
WC	(Morocco) E Benchetrit (Tunisia) A Dougaz	4	6^{4}
(France) J Eysseric (France) F Martin	6	6
(Italy) M Bortolotti (Spain) S Martos Gornés	3	4
(Netherlands) B Stevens (Greece) Pe Tsitsipas	3	4
(India) Y Bhambri (France) A Olivetti	6	6
(France) H Gaston; P Kotov	3	3
3	(Colombia) N Barrientos (Brazil) R Matos	6	6
(Bolivia) B Arias (Bolivia) F Zeballos	6^{5}	6	[10]
Alt	(India) S Nagal (Australia) A Vukic	7^{7}	4	[3]
(Austria) S Ofner (Austria) P Oswald	3	6^{4}
2	(Austria) A Erler (Austria) L Miedler	6	7^{7}

Quarterfinals
(Sweden) A Göransson (United States) R Stalder	3	4
(Argentina) G Andreozzi (Mexico) MÁ Reyes-Varela	6	6
4	(Finland) H Heliövaara (United Kingdom) H Patten	6	7
(France) J Eysseric (France) F Martin	2	5
(India) Y Bhambri (France) A Olivetti	7^{7}	6^{1}	[10]
3	(Colombia) N Barrientos (Brazil) R Matos	6^{5}	7^{7}	[7]
(Bolivia) B Arias (Bolivia) F Zeballos	6^{4}	4
2	(Austria) A Erler (Austria) L Miedler	7^{7}	6

Semifinals
(Argentina) G Andreozzi (Mexico) MÁ Reyes-Varela	3	4
4	(Finland) H Heliövaara (United Kingdom) H Patten	6	6
(India) Y Bhambri (France) A Olivetti	5	6	[7]
2	(Austria) A Erler (Austria) L Miedler	7	3	[10]

Final
4	(Finland) H Heliövaara (United Kingdom) H Patten	3	6	[10]
2	(Austria) A Erler (Austria) L Miedler	6	4	[4]
