= 2024 ATP Finals – Doubles =

Doubles
- 2024 ATP Finals

Final
- Champions: (Germany) Kevin Krawietz (Germany) Tim Pütz
- Runners-up: (El Salvador) Marcelo Arévalo (Croatia) Mate Pavić
- Score: 7–6^{(7–5)}, 7–6^{(8–6)}

Details
- Draw: 8 (round robin + elimination)
- Seeds: 8

Events
Singles	Doubles
- ATP Finals

Kevin Krawietz and Tim Pütz defeated Marcelo Arévalo and Mate Pavić in the final, 7–6^{(7–5)}, 7–6^{(8–6)} to win the doubles tennis title at the 2024 ATP Finals. They became the first ever all-German team in the tournament’s history and also the lowest-ranked pairing to win the title, since seeding was introduced in the doubles field in 1995. Pavić was attempting to become the sixth man to complete the Career Super Slam in men's doubles.

Rajeev Ram and Joe Salisbury were the two-time reigning champions, but did not qualify this year.

Arévalo and Pavić clinched the year-end ATP No. 1 doubles ranking both as individuals and as a team. Nikola Mektić, Jordan Thompson, Andrea Vavassori, and the pair of Marcel Granollers and Horacio Zeballos were also in contention for the No. 1 individual ranking at the start of the tournament.

Max Purcell, Thompson, Henry Patten, Pütz and Vavassori made their debuts in the doubles competition. Aged 44 years and 8 months old, Rohan Bopanna became the oldest man to win a match at the ATP Finals, with his win against Krawietz and Pütz in the final round-robin match.

== Seeds ==
1. (El Salvador) Marcelo Arévalo / (Croatia) Mate Pavić (final)
2. (Spain) Marcel Granollers / (Argentina) Horacio Zeballos (round robin)
3. (Netherlands) Wesley Koolhof / (Croatia) Nikola Mektić (round robin)
4. (Italy) Simone Bolelli / (Italy) Andrea Vavassori (round robin)
5. (Australia) Max Purcell / (Australia) Jordan Thompson (semifinals)
6. (India) Rohan Bopanna / (Australia) Matthew Ebden (round robin)
7. (Finland) Harri Heliövaara / (United Kingdom) Henry Patten (semifinals)
8. (Germany) Kevin Krawietz / (Germany) Tim Pütz (champions)

== Alternates ==
1. (United States) Nathaniel Lammons / (United States) Jackson Withrow (did not play)
2. (Argentina) Máximo González / (Argentina) Andrés Molteni (did not play)

== Draw ==
Key

- Q = Qualifier
- WC = Wild card
- LL = Lucky loser
- Alt = Alternate
- ITF = ITF entry
- PR = Protected ranking
- SR = Special ranking
- SE = Special exempt
- JE = Junior exempt
- JR = Junior Accelerator Programme entrant
- CO = College Accelerator Programme entrant
- NG = Next Gen Accelerator Program entrant
- w/o = Walkover
- r = Retired
- d = Defaulted

=== Finals ===
Semifinals
8	(Germany) Kevin Krawietz (Germany) Tim Pütz	2	6	[11]
5	(Australia) Max Purcell (Australia) Jordan Thompson	6	3	[9]
7	(Finland) Harri Heliövaara (United Kingdom) Henry Patten	6^{1}	6^{4}
1	(El Salvador) Marcelo Arévalo (Croatia) Mate Pavić	7^{7}	7^{7}

Final
8	(Germany) Kevin Krawietz (Germany) Tim Pütz	7^{7}	7^{8}
1	(El Salvador) Marcelo Arévalo (Croatia) Mate Pavić	6^{5}	6^{6}

=== Bob Bryan Group ===
		(El Salvador) Arévalo (Croatia) Pavić	(Italy) Bolelli (Italy) Vavassori	(India) Bopanna (Australia) Ebden	(Germany) Krawietz (Germany) Pütz	RR; W–L	Set; W–L	Game; W–L	Standings
1	(El Salvador) Marcelo Arévalo (Croatia) Mate Pavić		6–3, 3–6, [10–3]	7–5, 6–3	3–6, 4–6	2–1	4–3 (57%)	30–29 (51%)	2
4	(Italy) Simone Bolelli (Italy) Andrea Vavassori	3–6, 6–3, [3–10]		6–2, 6–3	5–7, 4–6	1–2	3–4 (43%)	30–28 (52%)	3
6	(India) Rohan Bopanna (Australia) Matthew Ebden	5–7, 3–6	2–6, 3–6		7–5, 6–7^{(6–8)}, [10–7]	1–2	2–5 (29%)	27–37 (42%)	4
8	(Germany) Kevin Krawietz (Germany) Tim Pütz	6–3, 6–4	7–5, 6–4	5–7, 7–6^{(8–6)}, [7–10]		2–1	5–2 (71%)	37–30 (55%)	1

=== Mike Bryan Group ===
		(Spain) Granollers (Argentina) Zeballos	(Netherlands) Koolhof (Croatia) Mektić	(Australia) Purcell (Australia) Thompson	(Finland) Heliövaara (United Kingdom) Patten	RR; W–L	Set; W–L	Game; W–L	Standings
2	(Spain) Marcel Granollers (Argentina) Horacio Zeballos		6–4, 6–7^{(6–8)}, [8–10]	6–7^{(14–16)}, 3–6	6–7^{(2–7)}, 4–6	0–3	1–6 (14%)	31–38 (45%)	4
3	(Netherlands) Wesley Koolhof (Croatia) Nikola Mektić	4–6, 7–6^{(8–6)}, [10–8]		6–7^{(1–7)}, 3–6	6–4, 3–6, [10–12]	1–2	3–5 (38%)	30–36 (45%)	3
5	(Australia) Max Purcell (Australia) Jordan Thompson	7–6^{(16–14)}, 6–3	7–6^{(7–1)}, 6–3		6–7^{(3–7)}, 5–7	2–1	4–2 (67%)	37–32 (54%)	2
7	(Finland) Harri Heliövaara (United Kingdom) Henry Patten	7–6^{(7–2)}, 6–4	4–6, 6–3, [12–10]	7–6^{(7–3)}, 7–5		3–0	6–1 (86%)	38–30 (56%)	1

Standings are determined by: 1. number of wins; 2. number of matches; 3. in two-team ties, head-to-head records; 4. in three-team ties, (a) percentage of sets won (head-to-head records if two teams remain tied), then (b) percentage of games won (head-to-head records if two teams remain tied), then (c) ATP rankings.
