= 2024 Wimbledon Championships – Men's doubles =

Men's doubles
- 2024 Wimbledon Championships

Final
- Champions: (Finland) Harri Heliövaara (United Kingdom) Henry Patten
- Runners-up: (Australia) Max Purcell (Australia) Jordan Thompson
- Score: 6–7^{(7–9)}, 7–6^{(10–8)}, 7–6^{(11–9)}

Events
Singles	men	women		boys	girls
Doubles	men	women	mixed	boys	girls
WC Singles	men	women	quad
WC Doubles	men	women	quad
14&U Singles	boys	girls
Legends	men	women	mixed
- Wimbledon Championships

Harri Heliövaara and Henry Patten defeated Max Purcell and Jordan Thompson in the final, 6–7^{(7–9)}, 7–6^{(10–8)}, 7–6^{(11–9)} to win the gentlemen's doubles tennis title at the 2024 Wimbledon Championships. They saved three championship points en route to both players' first major title in men's doubles. Heliövaara became the first Finnish man to win the title. Patten became the third British man in the Open Era to win the title after Neal Skupski (in 2023) and Jonathan Marray (in 2012). Heliövaara and Patten became the first unseeded team to win the title since Vasek Pospisil and Jack Sock in 2014.

Wesley Koolhof and Skupski were the defending champions, but chose not to defend the title together. Koolhof partnered Nikola Mektić, but lost in the second round to Charles Broom and Arthur Fery. Skupski partnered Michael Venus, but lost in the semifinals to Heliövaara and Patten.

The pair of Marcel Granollers and Horacio Zeballos regained the ATP No. 1 doubles ranking by reaching the semifinals, after current No. 1 Matthew Ebden lost in the second round. Marcelo Arévalo and Joe Salisbury were also in contention for the No. 1 ranking at the beginning of the tournament.

This tournament marked the final Wimbledon appearance of two-time singles champion, two-time Olympic gold medalist, and former singles world No. 1 Andy Murray. Partnering his brother Jamie Murray, he lost in the first round to Rinky Hijikata and John Peers.

== Seeds ==
1. (Spain) Marcel Granollers / (Argentina) Horacio Zeballos (semifinals)
2. (India) Rohan Bopanna / (Australia) Matthew Ebden (second round)
3. (United States) Rajeev Ram / (United Kingdom) Joe Salisbury (second round)
4. (El Salvador) Marcelo Arévalo / (Croatia) Mate Pavić (quarterfinals)
5. (Italy) Simone Bolelli / (Italy) Andrea Vavassori (first round)
6. (Mexico) Santiago González / (France) Édouard Roger-Vasselin (second round)
7. (Netherlands) Wesley Koolhof / (Croatia) Nikola Mektić (second round)
8. (Germany) Kevin Krawietz / (Germany) Tim Pütz (quarterfinals)
9. (United Kingdom) Neal Skupski / (New Zealand) Michael Venus (semifinals)
10. (Croatia) Ivan Dodig / (United States) Austin Krajicek (first round)
11. (Argentina) Máximo González / (Argentina) Andrés Molteni (quarterfinals)
12. (United States) Nathaniel Lammons / (United States) Jackson Withrow (third round)
13. (Monaco) Hugo Nys / (Poland) Jan Zieliński (first round)
14. (Belgium) Sander Gillé / (Belgium) Joran Vliegen (second round)
15. (Australia) Max Purcell / (Australia) Jordan Thompson (final)
16. (France) Sadio Doumbia / (France) Fabien Reboul (third round)

Click on the seed number of a player to go to their draw section.

== Draw ==
Key

- Q = Qualifier
- WC = Wild card
- LL = Lucky loser
- Alt = Alternate
- ITF = ITF entry
- PR = Protected ranking
- SR = Special ranking
- SE = Special exempt
- JE = Junior exempt
- JR = Junior Accelerator Programme entrant
- CO = College Accelerator Programme entrant
- NG = Next Gen Accelerator Program entrant
- w/o = Walkover
- r = Retired
- d = Defaulted

=== Finals ===
Quarterfinals
1	(Spain) Marcel Granollers (Argentina) Horacio Zeballos	6	7^{7}
8	(Germany) Kevin Krawietz (Germany) Tim Pütz	4	6^{3}
15	(Australia) Max Purcell (Australia) Jordan Thompson	6	6^{8}	6
11	(Argentina) Máximo González (Argentina) Andrés Molteni	4	7^{10}	3
(Finland) Harri Heliövaara (United Kingdom) Henry Patten	4	7^{7}	7^{10}
4	(El Salvador) Marcelo Arévalo (Croatia) Mate Pavić	6	6^{5}	6^{7}
9	(United Kingdom) Neal Skupski (New Zealand) Michael Venus	7^{7}	7^{7}
(Germany) Constantin Frantzen (Germany) Hendrik Jebens	6^{1}	6^{1}

Semifinals
1	(Spain) Marcel Granollers (Argentina) Horacio Zeballos	4	4
15	(Australia) Max Purcell (Australia) Jordan Thompson	6	6
(Finland) Harri Heliövaara (United Kingdom) Henry Patten	6	7^{7}
9	(United Kingdom) Neal Skupski (New Zealand) Michael Venus	4	6^{1}

Final
15	(Australia) Max Purcell (Australia) Jordan Thompson	7^{9}	6^{8}	6^{9}
(Finland) Harri Heliövaara (United Kingdom) Henry Patten	6^{7}	7^{10}	7^{11}

=== Top half ===
==== Section 1 ====
First round
1	(Spain) M Granollers (Argentina) H Zeballos	6	6
Alt	(Brazil) T Monteiro (Brazil) T Seyboth Wild	2	3
(France) N Mahut (Tunisia) S Mansouri	6	7^{7}
Alt	(United States) R Stalder (Australia) A Vukic	4	6^{3}
(Austria) S Ofner (Austria) S Weissborn	7	6
(Ecuador) D Hidalgo (Chile) A Tabilo	5	4
PR	(Argentina) S Báez (Jamaica) D Brown	3	6	7^{10}
13	(Monaco) H Nys (Poland) J Zieliński	6	3	6^{5}
12	(United States) N Lammons (United States) J Withrow	6	6
(United States) M Giron (United States) A Michelsen	3	2
(United States) M McDonald (United States) B Shelton	6	6^{3}	6
(Italy) F Cobolli (Italy) L Sonego	2	7^{7}	4
(Kazakhstan) A Bublik (Kazakhstan) A Shevchenko	4	4
(India) Y Bhambri (France) A Olivetti	6	6
(Italy) L Darderi (Brazil) F Romboli	4	2
8	(Germany) K Krawietz (Germany) T Pütz	6	6

Second round
1	(Spain) M Granollers (Argentina) H Zeballos	w/o
(France) N Mahut (Tunisia) S Mansouri
(Austria) S Ofner (Austria) S Weissborn	4^{r}
PR	(Argentina) S Báez (Jamaica) D Brown	3
12	(United States) N Lammons (United States) J Withrow	6	6
(United States) M McDonald (United States) B Shelton	4	4
(India) Y Bhambri (France) A Olivetti	6	4	3
8	(Germany) K Krawietz (Germany) T Pütz	4	6	6

Third round
1	(Spain) M Granollers (Argentina) H Zeballos	6	6
PR	(Argentina) S Báez (Jamaica) D Brown	3	3
12	(United States) N Lammons (United States) J Withrow	3	4
8	(Germany) K Krawietz (Germany) T Pütz	6	6

Quarterfinals
1	(Spain) M Granollers (Argentina) H Zeballos	6	7^{7}
8	(Germany) K Krawietz (Germany) T Pütz	4	6^{3}

==== Section 2 ====
First round
3	(United States) R Ram (United Kingdom) J Salisbury	7	6
(United States) W Blumberg (Norway) C Ruud	5	4
(Romania) VV Cornea (Hungary) F Marozsán	2	2
(Germany) A Mies (Australia) J-P Smith	6	6
PR	(France) F Martin (Netherlands) M Middelkoop	6	6
(Netherlands) T Griekspoor (Netherlands) B Stevens	4	3
WC	(United Kingdom) J Clarke (United Kingdom) M Willis	4	2
15	(Australia) M Purcell (Australia) J Thompson	6	6
11	(Argentina) M González (Argentina) A Molteni	7^{7}	6
(Greece) Pe Tsitsipas (Greece) S Tsitsipas	6^{3}	3
(Czech Republic) T Macháč (China) Z Zhang	2	6	6
(Uruguay) A Behar (Czech Republic) A Pavlásek	6	3	4
(Portugal) N Borges (France) A Rinderknech	4	4
WC	(United Kingdom) C Broom (United Kingdom) A Fery	6	6
(Argentina) F Coria (Argentina) M Navone	2	1
7	(Netherlands) W Koolhof (Croatia) N Mektić	6	6

Second round
3	(United States) R Ram (United Kingdom) J Salisbury	6	3	2
(Germany) A Mies (Australia) J-P Smith	4	6	6
PR	(France) F Martin (Netherlands) M Middelkoop	4	5
15	(Australia) M Purcell (Australia) J Thompson	6	7
11	(Argentina) M González (Argentina) A Molteni	7^{7}	6
(Czech Republic) T Macháč (China) Z Zhang	6^{4}	4
WC	(United Kingdom) C Broom (United Kingdom) A Fery	7^{7}	7^{7}
7	(Netherlands) W Koolhof (Croatia) N Mektić	6^{4}	6^{5}

Third round
(Germany) A Mies (Australia) J-P Smith	4	3
15	(Australia) M Purcell (Australia) J Thompson	6	6
11	(Argentina) M González (Argentina) A Molteni	6	6^{4}	7
WC	(United Kingdom) C Broom (United Kingdom) A Fery	2	7^{7}	5

Quarterfinals
15	(Australia) M Purcell (Australia) J Thompson	6	6^{8}	6
11	(Argentina) M González (Argentina) A Molteni	4	7^{10}	3

=== Bottom half ===
==== Section 3 ====
First round
5	(Italy) S Bolelli (Italy) A Vavassori	3	4
(Finland) H Heliövaara (United Kingdom) H Patten	6	6
(Spain) P Martínez (Spain) J Munar	6	6
(Serbia) D Lajović (India) S Nagal	2	2
WC	(United Kingdom) J Fearnley (United Kingdom) J Pinnington Jones	4	6^{5}
(Brazil) R Matos (Brazil) M Melo	6	7^{7}
(Colombia) N Barrientos (Portugal) F Cabral	7^{7}	7^{8}
10	(Croatia) I Dodig (United States) A Krajicek	6^{4}	6^{6}
16	(France) S Doumbia (France) F Reboul	7	7^{7}
WC	(United Kingdom) O Crawford (United Kingdom) K Edmund	5	6^{3}
(United Kingdom) J Cash (United States) R Galloway	7^{8}	6
PR	(France) T Arribagé (New Zealand) M Daniell	6^{6}	3
Alt	(Monaco) R Arneodo (Netherlands) S Verbeek	2	6	7
(Ecuador) G Escobar (Kazakhstan) A Nedovyesov	6	2	5
(India) S Balaji (United Kingdom) L Johnson	4	5
4	(El Salvador) M Arévalo (Croatia) M Pavić	6	7

Second round
(Finland) H Heliövaara (United Kingdom) H Patten	7^{7}	6
(Spain) P Martínez (Spain) J Munar	6^{5}	3
(Brazil) R Matos (Brazil) M Melo	6^{1}	7^{7}	7^{10}
(Colombia) N Barrientos (Portugal) F Cabral	7^{7}	6^{5}	6^{3}
16	(France) S Doumbia (France) F Reboul	6^{5}	6	7^{10}
(United Kingdom) J Cash (United States) R Galloway	7^{7}	4	6^{4}
Alt	(Monaco) R Arneodo (Netherlands) S Verbeek	4	4
4	(El Salvador) M Arévalo (Croatia) M Pavić	6	6

Third round
(Finland) H Heliövaara (United Kingdom) H Patten	7^{7}	6
(Brazil) R Matos (Brazil) M Melo	6^{1}	2
16	(France) S Doumbia (France) F Reboul	4	6^{1}
4	(El Salvador) M Arévalo (Croatia) M Pavić	6	7^{7}

Quarterfinals
(Finland) H Heliövaara (United Kingdom) H Patten	4	7^{7}	7^{10}
4	(El Salvador) M Arévalo (Croatia) M Pavić	6	6^{5}	6^{7}

==== Section 4 ====
First round
6	(Mexico) S González (France) É Roger-Vasselin	6	3	6
WC	(United Kingdom) D Evans (United Kingdom) H Searle	3	6	3
Alt	(United States) C Eubanks (United States) E King	7	7
WC	(United Kingdom) L Broady (United Kingdom) B Harris	5	5
(Australia) R Hijikata (Australia) J Peers	7^{8}	6
WC	(United Kingdom) A Murray (United Kingdom) J Murray	6^{6}	4
(Austria) A Erler (Austria) L Miedler	7^{7}	3	6^{5}
9	(United Kingdom) N Skupski (New Zealand) M Venus	6^{5}	6	7^{10}
14	(Belgium) S Gillé (Belgium) J Vliegen	6	6
Alt	(Argentina) F Díaz Acosta (France) A Müller	2	3
(Argentina) G Andreozzi (Mexico) MÁ Reyes-Varela	0	3
(United Kingdom) L Glasspool (Netherlands) J-J Rojer	6	6
(Germany) C Frantzen (Germany) H Jebens	7^{7}	7^{7}
P Kotov (Colombia) C Rodríguez	6^{3}	6^{3}
Alt	(Netherlands) S Arends (Netherlands) R Haase	5	4
2	(India) R Bopanna (Australia) M Ebden	7	6

Second round
6	(Mexico) S González (France) É Roger-Vasselin	3	6^{3}
Alt	(United States) C Eubanks (United States) E King	6	7^{7}
(Australia) R Hijikata (Australia) J Peers	4	7^{7}	4
9	(United Kingdom) N Skupski (New Zealand) M Venus	6	6^{5}	6
14	(Belgium) S Gillé (Belgium) J Vliegen	6^{5}	6^{4}
(United Kingdom) L Glasspool (Netherlands) J-J Rojer	7^{7}	7^{7}
(Germany) C Frantzen (Germany) H Jebens	6	7^{7}
2	(India) R Bopanna (Australia) M Ebden	3	6^{4}

Third round
Alt	(United States) C Eubanks (United States) E King	5	3
9	(United Kingdom) N Skupski (New Zealand) M Venus	7	6
(United Kingdom) L Glasspool (Netherlands) J-J Rojer	6^{5}	6^{3}
(Germany) C Frantzen (Germany) H Jebens	7^{7}	7^{7}

Quarterfinals
9	(United Kingdom) N Skupski (New Zealand) M Venus	7^{7}	7^{7}
(Germany) C Frantzen (Germany) H Jebens	6^{1}	6^{1}

== Seeded teams ==
The following are the seeded teams. Seedings are based on ATP rankings as of 24 June 2024.

Country	Player	Country	Player	Rank	Seed
ESP	Marcel Granollers	ARG	Horacio Zeballos	4	1
IND	Rohan Bopanna	AUS	Matthew Ebden	5	2
USA	Rajeev Ram	GBR	Joe Salisbury	11	3
ESA	Marcelo Arévalo	CRO	Mate Pavić	16	4
ITA	Simone Bolelli	ITA	Andrea Vavassori	21	5
MEX	Santiago González	FRA	Édouard Roger-Vasselin	26	6
NED	Wesley Koolhof	CRO	Nikola Mektić	29	7
GER	Kevin Krawietz	GER	Tim Pütz	30	8
GBR	Neal Skupski	NZL	Michael Venus	34	9
CRO	Ivan Dodig	USA	Austin Krajicek	36	10
ARG	Máximo González	ARG	Andrés Molteni	38	11
USA	Nathaniel Lammons	USA	Jackson Withrow	46	12
MON	Hugo Nys	POL	Jan Zieliński	55	13
BEL	Sander Gillé	BEL	Joran Vliegen	58	14
AUS	Max Purcell	AUS	Jordan Thompson	63	15
FRA	Sadio Doumbia	FRA	Fabien Reboul	67	16

== Other entry information ==
=== Wildcards ===
- (United Kingdom) Liam Broady / (United Kingdom) Billy Harris
- (United Kingdom) Charles Broom / (United Kingdom) Arthur Fery
- (United Kingdom) Jay Clarke / (United Kingdom) Marcus Willis
- (United Kingdom) Oliver Crawford / (United Kingdom) Kyle Edmund
- (United Kingdom) Dan Evans / (United Kingdom) Henry Searle
- (United Kingdom) Jacob Fearnley / (United Kingdom) Jack Pinnington Jones
- (United Kingdom) Andy Murray / (United Kingdom) Jamie Murray

=== Protected ranking ===
- (France) Théo Arribagé / (New Zealand) Marcus Daniell
- (Argentina) Sebastián Báez / (Jamaica) Dustin Brown
- ~~(Australia) Thanasi Kokkinakis / (Canada) Denis Shapovalov~~
- (France) Fabrice Martin / (Netherlands) Matwé Middelkoop

=== Alternates ===
- (Netherlands) Sander Arends / (Netherlands) Robin Haase
- (Monaco) Romain Arneodo / (Netherlands) Sem Verbeek
- (Argentina) Facundo Díaz Acosta / (France) Alexandre Müller
- (United States) Christopher Eubanks / (United States) Evan King
- (Brazil) Thiago Monteiro / (Brazil) Thiago Seyboth Wild
- (United States) Reese Stalder / (Australia) Aleksandar Vukic

=== Withdrawals ===
- (Spain) Roberto Carballés Baena / (Spain) Pablo Carreño Busta → replaced by (Monaco) Romain Arneodo / (Netherlands) Sem Verbeek
- (Argentina) Francisco Cerúndolo / (Argentina) Tomás Martín Etcheverry → replaced by (Argentina) Facundo Díaz Acosta / (France) Alexandre Müller
- (France) Arthur Fils / (France) Ugo Humbert → replaced by (Brazil) Thiago Monteiro / (Brazil) Thiago Seyboth Wild
- (France) Hugo Gaston / (France) Corentin Moutet → replaced by (United States) Christopher Eubanks / (United States) Evan King
- (Australia) Thanasi Kokkinakis / (Canada) Denis Shapovalov → replaced by (United States) Reese Stalder / (Australia) Aleksandar Vukic
- (France) Adrian Mannarino / (France) Giovanni Mpetshi Perricard → replaced by (Netherlands) Sander Arends / (Netherlands) Robin Haase

Preceded by 2024 French Open – Men's doubles	Grand Slam men's doubles	Succeeded by 2024 US Open – Men's doubles
