= 2026 Mutua Madrid Open – Men's doubles =

Men's doubles
- 2026 Mutua Madrid Open

Final
- Champions: (Finland) Harri Heliövaara (United Kingdom) Henry Patten
- Runners-up: (Argentina) Guido Andreozzi (France) Manuel Guinard
- Score: 6–3, 3–6, [10–7]

Details
- Draw: 32
- Seeds: 8

Events
Singles	men	women
Doubles	men	women
- Mutua Madrid Open

Harri Heliövaara and Henry Patten defeated Guido Andreozzi and Manuel Guinard in the final, 6–3, 3–6, [10–7] to win the men's doubles tennis title at the 2026 Madrid Open.

Marcel Granollers and Horacio Zeballos were the defending champions, but lost in the first round to Romain Arneodo and Valentin Vacherot. As a result, Neal Skupski regained the ATP No. 1 doubles ranking from Zeballos.

== Seeds ==
1. (Spain) Marcel Granollers / (Argentina) Horacio Zeballos (first round)
2. (United Kingdom) Julian Cash / (United Kingdom) Lloyd Glasspool (first round)
3. (Finland) Harri Heliövaara / (United Kingdom) Henry Patten (champions)
4. (United States) Christian Harrison / (United Kingdom) Neal Skupski (second round)
5. (El Salvador) Marcelo Arévalo / (Croatia) Mate Pavić (quarterfinals)
6. (Germany) Kevin Krawietz / (Germany) Tim Pütz (first round)
7. (Portugal) Francisco Cabral / (United Kingdom) Joe Salisbury (second round)
8. (Italy) Simone Bolelli / (Italy) Andrea Vavassori (first round)

== Draw ==
Key

- Q = Qualifier
- WC = Wild card
- LL = Lucky loser
- Alt = Alternate
- ITF = ITF entry
- PR = Protected ranking
- SR = Special ranking
- SE = Special exempt
- JE = Junior exempt
- JR = Junior Accelerator Programme entrant
- CO = College Accelerator Programme entrant
- NG = Next Gen Accelerator Program entrant
- w/o = Walkover
- r = Retired
- d = Defaulted

=== Finals ===
Semifinals
(Argentina) Guido Andreozzi (France) Manuel Guinard	6	7^{7}
(Argentina) Máximo González (Argentina) Andrés Molteni	4	6^{3}
3	(Finland) Harri Heliövaara (United Kingdom) Henry Patten	6	4
(United Kingdom) Luke Johnson (Poland) Jan Zieliński	3	3^{r}

Final
(Argentina) Guido Andreozzi (France) Manuel Guinard	3	6	[7]
3	(Finland) Harri Heliövaara (United Kingdom) Henry Patten	6	3	[10]

=== Top half ===
First round
1	(Spain) M Granollers (Argentina) H Zeballos	6	1	[6]
(Monaco) R Arneodo (Monaco) V Vacherot	2	6	[10]
(India) Y Bhambri (New Zealand) M Venus	7	7^{7}
(Austria) A Erler (Austria) L Miedler	5	6^{1}
(Brazil) M Melo (Germany) A Zverev	5	4
(Italy) L Darderi (Greece) S Tsitsipas	7	6
(Argentina) G Andreozzi (France) M Guinard	6	7^{7}
8	(Italy) S Bolelli (Italy) A Vavassori	3	6^{3}
4	(United States) C Harrison (United Kingdom) N Skupski	6	3	[10]
(United States) R Cash (United States) JJ Tracy	3	6	[7]
(Netherlands) S Arends (Netherlands) D Pel	4	6	[4]
(Sweden) A Göransson (United States) E King	6	1	[10]
(Monaco) H Nys (France) É Roger-Vasselin	7	3	[6]
(Argentina) M González (Argentina) A Molteni	5	6	[10]
Alt	(Germany) J Schnaitter (Germany) M Wallner	3	6^{3}
7	(Portugal) F Cabral (United Kingdom) J Salisbury	6	7^{7}

Second round
(Monaco) R Arneodo (Monaco) V Vacherot	7^{7}	3	[10]
(India) Y Bhambri (New Zealand) M Venus	6^{3}	6	[2]
(Italy) L Darderi (Greece) S Tsitsipas	7	1	[9]
(Argentina) G Andreozzi (France) M Guinard	5	6	[11]
4	(United States) C Harrison (United Kingdom) N Skupski	6	6^{4}	[13]
(Sweden) A Göransson (United States) E King	4	7^{7}	[15]
(Argentina) M González (Argentina) A Molteni	6	6
7	(Portugal) F Cabral (United Kingdom) J Salisbury	0	4

Quarterfinals
(Monaco) R Arneodo (Monaco) V Vacherot	4	6	[6]
(Argentina) G Andreozzi (France) M Guinard	6	3	[10]
(Sweden) A Göransson (United States) E King	6^{6}	2
(Argentina) M González (Argentina) A Molteni	7^{8}	6

Semifinals
(Argentina) G Andreozzi (France) M Guinard	6	7^{7}
(Argentina) M González (Argentina) A Molteni	4	6^{3}

=== Bottom half ===
First round
5	(El Salvador) M Arévalo (Croatia) M Pavić	6	7^{8}
(United States) T Paul (United States) E Quinn	4	6^{6}
(Kazakhstan) A Bublik (Australia) M Polmans	6	6^{4}	[10]
(Brazil) O Luz (Brazil) R Matos	3	7^{7}	[6]
(France) T Arribagé (France) A Olivetti	7^{7}	6
WC	(Spain) P Carreño Busta (Spain) Í Cervantes	6^{5}	3
(Chile) A Tabilo (United States) L Tien	5	5
3	(Finland) H Heliövara (United Kingdom) H Patten	7	7
6	(Germany) K Krawietz (Germany) T Pütz	6^{7}	6^{5}
(Netherlands) T Griekspoor (United States) B Nakashima	7^{9}	7^{7}
Alt	(United States) R Galloway (Mexico) S González	3	3
(United Kingdom) L Johnson (Poland) J Zieliński	6	6
WC	(Spain) P Llamas Ruiz (Spain) B Winter López	6	6^{5}	[12]
(United States) A Krajicek (Croatia) N Mektić	3	7^{7}	[10]
(France) S Doumbia (France) F Reboul	6	6
2	(United Kingdom) J Cash (United Kingdom) L Glasspool	3	3

Second round
5	(El Salvador) M Arévalo (Croatia) M Pavić	6	6
(Kazakhstan) A Bublik (Australia) M Polmans	4	4
(France) T Arribagé (France) A Olivetti	6	6^{8}	[8]
3	(Finland) H Heliövara (United Kingdom) H Patten	2	7^{10}	[10]
(Netherlands) T Griekspoor (United States) B Nakashima	2	6	[3]
(United Kingdom) L Johnson (Poland) J Zieliński	6	4	[10]
WC	(Spain) P Llamas Ruiz (Spain) B Winter López	4	4
(France) S Doumbia (France) F Reboul	6	6

Quarterfinals
5	(El Salvador) M Arévalo (Croatia) M Pavić	3	6^{3}
3	(Finland) H Heliövara (United Kingdom) H Patten	6	7^{7}
(United Kingdom) L Johnson (Poland) J Zieliński	4	6	[10]
(France) S Doumbia (France) F Reboul	6	3	[6]

Semifinals
3	(Finland) H Heliövara (United Kingdom) H Patten	6	4
(United Kingdom) L Johnson (Poland) J Zieliński	3	3^{r}

== Seeded teams ==
The following are the seeded teams. Seedings are based on ATP rankings as of April 20, 2026.

Country	Player	Country	Player	Rank	Seed
ESP	Marcel Granollers	ARG	Horacio Zeballos	3	1
GBR	Julian Cash	GBR	Lloyd Glasspool	9	2
FIN	Harri Heliövaara	GBR	Henry Patten	12	3
USA	Christian Harrison	GBR	Neal Skupski	16	4
ESA	Marcelo Arévalo	CRO	Mate Pavić	18	5
GER	Kevin Krawietz	GER	Tim Pütz	23	6
POR	Francisco Cabral	GBR	Joe Salisbury	29	7
ITA	Simone Bolelli	ITA	Andrea Vavassori	29	8

== Other entry information ==
=== Wildcards ===
- (Spain) Pablo Carreño Busta / (Spain) Íñigo Cervantes
- (Spain) Pablo Llamas Ruiz / (Spain) Benjamín Winter López
- ~~(France) Corentin Moutet / (France) Arthur Rinderknech~~

=== Alternates ===
- (United States) Robert Galloway / (Mexico) Santiago González
- (Germany) Jakob Schnaitter / (Germany) Mark Wallner

=== Withdrawals ===
- (Argentina) Francisco Cerúndolo / (Argentina) Tomás Martín Etcheverry → replaced by (Germany) Jakob Schnaitter / (Germany) Mark Wallner
- (France) Corentin Moutet / (France) Arthur Rinderknech → replaced by (United States) Robert Galloway / (Mexico) Santiago González
