= Henry Patten =

British tennis player (born 1996)

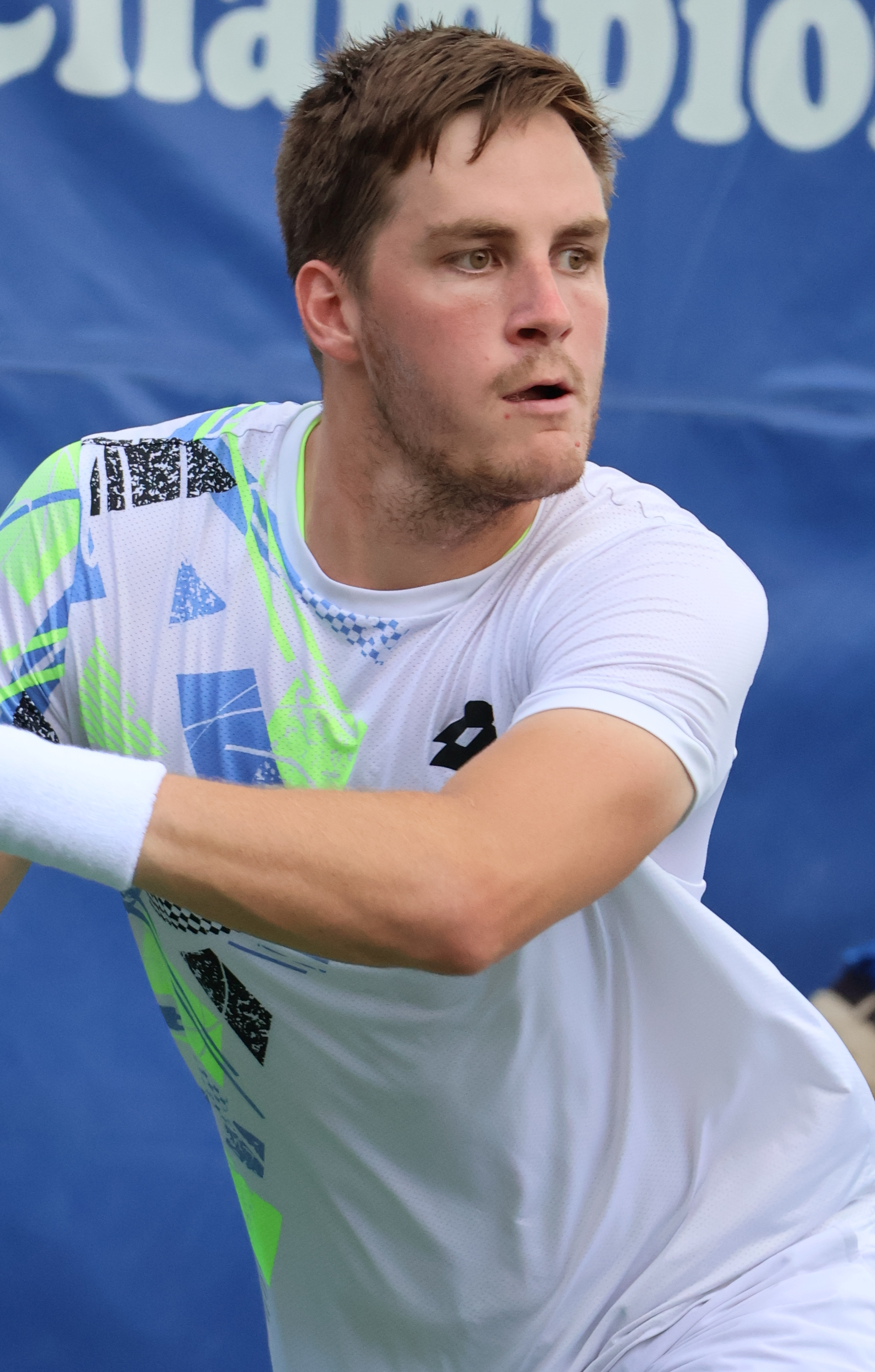
- Patten at the 2023 Cary Challenger
- Country (sports): Great Britain
- Born: 6 May 1996 (age 30) Colchester, United Kingdom
- Height: 1.98 m (6 ft 6 in)
- Turned pro: 2020
- Plays: Left-handed (two-handed backhand)
- College: UNC Asheville
- Coach: Calvin Betton
- Prize money: US $4,573,284

Singles
- Career record: 0–0
- Career titles: 0 Challenger, 1 ITF
- Highest ranking: No. 462 (19 September 2022)

Doubles
- Career record: 153–68
- Career titles: 13
- Highest ranking: No. 1 (8 June 2026)
- Current ranking: No. 1 (8 June 2026)

Grand Slam doubles results
- Australian Open: W (2025)
- French Open: F (2026)
- Wimbledon: W (2024, 2026)
- US Open: SF (2026)

Other doubles tournaments
- Tour Finals: W (2025)

Mixed doubles
- Career record: 7–5
- Career titles: 0

Grand Slam mixed doubles results
- Australian Open: SF (2025)
- French Open: QF (2025)
- Wimbledon: 2R (2024)
- US Open: QF (2026)
- Last updated on: 9 November 2026.

Henry Patten (born 6 May 1996) is a British professional tennis player who specialises in doubles. He has a career-high doubles ranking of world No. 1 by the ATP, achieved on 8 June 2026. He is a three-time Grand Slam champion in doubles, having won the 2024 and 2026 Wimbledon Championships and the 2025 Australian Open with Harri Heliövaara.

Patten has won 13 career doubles titles on the ATP Tour. He has also won 13 ATP Challenger titles, 11 with Julian Cash. Ten of the titles came in 2022, a record for the most Challenger doubles titles accrued in a single season.

He also attained his career-high singles ranking of world No. 462 in September 2022.

== Early and personal life ==
Patten was born on 6 May 1996 in Manningtree, Essex, England. He attended Ipswich School and Culford School, before he enrolled at the University of North Carolina at Asheville, where he played collegiate tennis. He continued his postgraduate studies at Durham University (2019–2020). During two of his university summer breaks, he worked for IBM as a courtside statistician at Wimbledon.

Patten is a member of the Roehampton Club. He is also a chess enthusiast, often playing the game while on tour.

Patten proposed to his longtime girlfriend, Ellie Stone, who is a medical physician, on November 16, 2025, in Turin prior to the 2025 ATP Finals. They met while students at UNC Asheville, where he played tennis and she played football.

== College ==
While at UNC Asheville, Patten became the No. 1 ranked NCAA doubles player and placed as high as No. 32 in singles. In 2018 he was the first player in the history of his program to be selected for the singles draw of the NCAA Men's Tennis Championships. At Durham he finished runner-up with Josip Krstanovic to fellow Durham students Julius Tverijonas and Or Ram-Harel in the 2019 BUCS Men's Doubles Championship.

== Career ==
=== 2022: Record Challenger titles in a season ===
Patten won ten titles in 2022, breaking the record for most Challenger doubles titles in a single season with Julian Cash.

=== 2023: First ATP final, top 50 ===
Patten partnering with Julian Cash reached his first ATP final at the 2023 U.S. Men's Clay Court Championships, losing to Jordan Thompson and Max Purcell in a deciding champions tiebreak. He reached the top 50 on 22 May 2023.

=== 2024: Wimbledon champion, Maiden ATP title, Davis Cup debut ===
In April, Patten won his maiden ATP title at the Grand Prix Hassan II partnering with new partner Harri Heliövaara, defeating second seeded Austrian duo of Alexander Erler and Lucas Miedler. In May, Patten and Heliövaara defeated top seeds Andreas Mies and Neal Skupski in the final of the Turin Challenger. Patten won his second title at the Lyon Open partnering also with Heliövaara. The duo defeated Albano Olivetti and Yuki Bhambri in the final.

Patten and Heliövaara reached the final at Wimbledon, defeating Italian duo Andrea Vavassori and Simone Bolelli, Spanish duo Pedro Martínez and Jaume Munar, and then Marcelo Arévalo and Mate Pavić in the quarterfinals, Neal Skupski and Michael Venus in the semifinals. They defeated Australian duo Jordan Thompson and Max Purcell in the final, in a three-setter with three tiebreaks, saving three match points, to win their first Grand Slam title together. As a result he moved 25 positions up to a new career-high doubles ranking of world No. 17 on 15 July 2024 and to the top 15 three weeks later on 5 August 2024.

Seeded sixth at the US Open, Patten and Heliovaara reached the third round with a win over Flavio Cobolli and Dominic Stricker, before losing to 11th seeds Wesley Koolhof and Nikola Mektić.

Patten made his debut for the Great Britain Davis Cup team against Canada in Manchester, England, on 15 September, teaming with Neal Skupski to defeat Gabriel Diallo and Alexis Galarneau in a dead rubber after the tie was already lost following wins for the Canadians in both singles matches.

Patten and Heliovaara were runners-up at the China Open in October, losing in the final to top seeds Simone Bolelli and Andrea Vavassori. The next week they won the Stockholm Open, defeating Petr Nouza and Patrik Rikl in the final. They followed this by reaching the semifinals at the Vienna Open, losing in a deciding tiebreak to wildcards and eventual champions Alexander Erler and Lucas Miedler after squandering two match points.

Patten reached a career-high ranking of world No. 15 on 28 October 2024, becoming the British men's doubles No.1 for the first time. His place alongside Heliovaara at the ATP Finals was also confirmed with the duo having secured a top eight spot in the ATP Doubles Race to qualify.

At the ATP Finals, Patten and Heliövaara defeated world No.1 team Marcel Granollers and Horacio Zeballos in straight sets in their first group match. In their second group match, they defeated US Open champions Jordan Thompson and Max Purcell in straight sets. Patten and Heliövaara then secured first place in their group by winning their third match against Wesley Koolhof and Nikola Mektic in a deciding champions tiebreak. They lost in the semifinals to top seeds Marcelo Arévalo and Mate Pavić in two sets, both of which went to tiebreaks.

=== 2025: Australian Open and ATP finals champion, World No. 3 ===
Alongside Heliövaara, Patten won the doubles title at the Australian Open, defeating third seeds Simone Bolelli and Andrea Vavassori in the final and in doing so, becoming the third British player to win the event in the Open Era. On the way to the final they overcame Rithvik Choudary Bollipalli and Ryan Seggerman, Marc Polmans and Matthew Romios, Austin Krajicek and Rajeev Ram, 15th seeds Hugo Nys and Edouard Roger-Vasselin and fourth seeds Kevin Krawietz and Tim Pütz. Partnering Olivia Nicholls, he also reached the mixed doubles semifinals after overcoming top seeds Andrea Vavassori and Sara Errani in the second round and then Jackson Withrow and Irina Khromacheva in the quarterfinals. They lost to John-Patrick Smith and Kimberly Birrell in the last four. Patten reached a career-high of world No. 3 in the ATP doubles rankings on 27 January.

Seeded second, Patten and Heliövaara were runners-up at the Dubai Tennis Championships in March, losing in the final to Yuki Bhambri and Alexei Popyrin. Again seeded second at the French Open, they lost in the quarterfinals to ninth seeds Evan King and Christian Harrison. Teaming up with Olivia Nicholls, Patten also reached the quarterfinals in the mixed doubles, but pulled out at that stage due to Nicholls' suffering a hand injury.

Defending their titles at Wimbledon, Patten and Heliövaara lost in the quarterfinals to Julian Cash and Lloyd Glasspool.

Seeded third, Patten and Heliövaara won the title at the China Open, defeating Karen Khachanov and Andrey Rublev in the final and clinching their place at the end of season Tour finals in the process.

At the Paris Masters, they defeated Julian Cash and Lloyd Glasspool in the final to claim their third title of the year.

Patten and Heliövaara won the season-ending ATP Finals in Turin, defeating Joe Salisbury and Neal Skupski in the final in straight sets.

=== 2026: World No. 1, second Wimbledon title ===
Seeded second, Patten and Heliövaara began their 2026 season by winning the Adelaide International, defeating Kevin Krawietz and Tim Pütz in the final. In February they won back-to-back titles, first at the Qatar Open where they overcame top seeds Julian Cash and Lloyd Glasspool in the championship match, and then at the Dubai Tennis Championships where Marcelo Arévalo and Mate Pavić were their final opponents.

At the Miami Open, Patten and Heliövaara reached their fourth final of the year, but lost to Simone Bolelli and Andrea Vavassori. They made it through to the final at the Madrid Open, and overcame Guido Andreozzi and Manuel Guinard in a deciding champions' tiebreak to claim their fourth title of the season.

Seeded second Patten and Heliövaara were runners-up at the French Open, losing to top seeds and defending champions, Marcel Granollers and Horacio Zeballos, in the final. Despite their defeat, the pair became joint world No. 1 on 8 June 2026..Moving onto the grass court swing of the season, at the Queen's Club Championships, they reached the final but lost to Marcelo Arévalo and Mate Pavić. The two pairs met again in the final at Wimbledon with Patten and Heliovaara coming out on top in straight sets to claim their second title at the event and third major overall as a team. This also meant Patten became the first British player to win the Wimbledon men's doubles title twice in the Open Era.

In September at the US Open, Patten and Heliövaara lost to eventual champions Neal Skupski and Christian Harrison in the semifinals. The next week, Patten teamed with Skupski to win the doubles rubber which clinched Great Britain's victory over Ecuador in their Davis Cup Qualifier at the Copper Box Arena in London.

After a semifinal showing at the Paris Masters in November, Patten and Heliövaara secured the team year-end No. 1 ranking, the first-time either player had achieved the feat. Defending their title at the ATP Finals, they were eliminated in the round-robin stage.

== Doubles performance timeline ==
Key
W	F	SF	QF	#R	RR	Q#	DNQ	A	NH

(W) winner; (F) finalist; (SF) semifinalist; (QF) quarterfinalist; (#R) rounds 4, 3, 2, 1; (RR) round-robin stage; (Q#) qualification round; (DNQ) did not qualify; (A) absent; (NH) not held; (SR) strike rate (events won / competed); (W–L) win–loss record.
To avoid confusion and double counting, these charts are updated at the conclusion of a tournament or when the player's participation has ended.

=== Doubles ===
Current through the 2026 ATP Finals.

Tournament	2021	2022	2023	2024	2025	2026	SR	W–L	Win %
Grand Slam tournaments
Australian Open	A	A	2R	2R	W	3R	1 / 4	10–3	
French Open	A	A	1R	3R	QF	F	0 / 4	10–3	
Wimbledon	A	1R	A	W	QF (Note: Heliovaara/Patten received a walkover into the quarterfinals, which does not count as a win.)	W	2 / 4	14–2	
US Open	A	A	3R	3R	1R	SF	0 / 4	8–4	
Win–loss	0–0	0–1	3–3	11–2	11–3	17–3	3 / 16	42–12	
Year-end championship
ATP Finals	DNQ			SF	W	RR	2 / 3	8–4	
National representation
Davis Cup	A	A	A	RR	A		0 / 1	1–0	
ATP 1000 tournaments
Indian Wells Open	A	A	A	A	2R	A	0 / 1	1–1	
Miami Open	A	A	A	A	SF	F	0 / 2	6–2	
Monte Carlo Masters	A	A	A	A	SF	QF	0 / 2	3–2	
Madrid Open	A	A	A	A	QF	W	1 / 2	7–1	
Italian Open	A	A	A	1R	SF	QF	0 / 3	4–3	
Canadian Open	A	A	A	1R	2R	QF	0 / 3	3–3	
Cincinnati Masters	A	A	A	QF	1R	2R	0 / 3	3–3	
Shanghai Masters	A	A	A	1R	QF	A	0 / 2	2–2	
Paris Masters	A	A	A	QF	W	SF	1 / 3	7–2	
Win–loss	0–0	0–0	0–0	3–5	16–8	17–6	2 / 21	36–19	
Career statistics
Tournaments	0	2	13	27	23	12	Career total: 77		
Titles	0	0	0	4	4	5	Career total: 13		
Finals	0	0	1	6	5	8	Career total: 20		
Overall win–loss	0–0	0–2	10–13	43–22	50–20	39–7	13 / 77	142–63	
Win %	0%	0%	43%	66%	71%	85%	Career total: 69%		
Year-end ranking	774	69	69	14	3				

=== Mixed doubles ===
Tournament	2024	2025	2026	SR	W–L
Australian Open	A	SF	1R	0 / 2	3–2
French Open	A	QF (Note: Patten/Olivia Nicholls withdrew before the quarterfinals, which does not count as a loss.)	2R (Note: Patten/Olivia Nicholls withdrew before the second round, which does not count as a loss.)	0 / 2	3–0
Wimbledon	2R	1R	1R	0 / 3	1–3
US Open	A	A	QF	0 / 1	3–1
Win–loss	1–1	5–3	4–2	0 / 8	10–6

== Grand Slam tournament finals ==
=== Doubles: 4 (3 titles, 1 runner-up) ===
Result	Year	Tournament	Surface	Partner	Opponents	Score
Win	2024	Wimbledon	Grass	(Finland) Harri Heliövaara	(Australia) Max Purcell (Australia) Jordan Thompson	6–7^{(7–9)}, 7–6^{(10–8)}, 7–6^{(11–9)}
Win	2025	Australian Open	Hard	(Finland) Harri Heliövaara	(Italy) Simone Bolelli (Italy) Andrea Vavassori	6–7^{(16–18)}, 7–6^{(7–5)}, 6–3
Loss	2026	French Open	Clay	(Finland) Harri Heliövaara	(Spain) Marcel Granollers (Argentina) Horacio Zeballos	4–6, 2–6
Win	2026	Wimbledon (2)	Grass	(Finland) Harri Heliövaara	(El Salvador) Marcelo Arévalo (Croatia) Mate Pavić	7–6^{(7–4)}, 7–6^{(7–3)}

== Other significant finals ==
=== Year-end championships ===
==== Doubles: 1 (1 title) ====
Result	Year	Tournament	Surface	Partner	Opponents	Score
Win	2025	ATP Finals, Turin	Hard (i)	(Finland) Harri Heliövaara	(United Kingdom) Joe Salisbury (United Kingdom) Neal Skupski	7–5, 6–3

=== ATP 1000 tournaments ===
==== Doubles: 3 (2 titles, 1 runner-up) ====
Result	Year	Tournament	Surface	Partner	Opponents	Score
Win	2025	Paris Masters	Hard (i)	(Finland) Harri Heliövaara	(United Kingdom) Julian Cash (United Kingdom) Lloyd Glasspool	6–3, 6–4
Loss	2026	Miami Open	Hard	(Finland) Harri Heliövaara	(Italy) Simone Bolelli (Italy) Andrea Vavassori	4–6, 2–6
Win	2026	Madrid Open	Clay	(Finland) Harri Heliövaara	(Argentina) Guido Andreozzi (France) Manuel Guinard	6–3, 3–6, [10–7]

== ATP Tour finals ==
=== Doubles: 20 (13 titles, 7 runner-ups) ===
Legend Grand Slam tournaments (3–1) ATP Finals (1–0) ATP 1000 (2–1) ATP 500 (3–3) ATP 250 (4–2)	Finals by surface Hard (8–3) Clay (3–3) Grass (2–1)	Titles by setting Outdoor (10–7) Indoor (3–0)

Result	W–L	Date	Tournament	Tier	Surface	Partner	Opponents	Score
Loss	0–1	Apr 2023	US Clay Court Championships, US	ATP 250	Clay	(United Kingdom) Julian Cash	(Australia) Max Purcell (Australia) Jordan Thompson	6–4, 4–6, [5–10]
Win	1–1	Apr 2024	Grand Prix Hassan II, Morocco	ATP 250	Clay	(Finland) Harri Heliövaara	(Austria) Alexander Erler (Austria) Lucas Miedler	3–6, 6–4, [10–4]
Loss	1–2	Apr 2024	Țiriac Open, Romania	ATP 250	Clay	(Finland) Harri Heliövaara	(France) Sadio Doumbia (France) Fabien Reboul	3–6, 5–7
Win	2–2	May 2024	ATP Lyon Open, France	ATP 250	Clay	(Finland) Harri Heliövaara	(India) Yuki Bhambri (France) Albano Olivetti	3–6, 7–6^{(7–4)}, [10–8]
Win	3–2	Jul 2024	Wimbledon Championships, UK	Grand Slam	Grass	(Finland) Harri Heliövaara	(Australia) Max Purcell (Australia) Jordan Thompson	6–7^{(7–9)}, 7–6^{(10–8)}, 7–6^{(11–9)}
Loss	3–3	Oct 2024	China Open, China	ATP 500	Hard	(Finland) Harri Heliövaara	(Italy) Simone Bolelli (Italy) Andrea Vavassori	6–4, 3–6, [5–10]
Win	4–3	Oct 2024	Stockholm Open, Sweden	ATP 250	Hard (i)	(Finland) Harri Heliövaara	(Czech Republic) Petr Nouza (Czech Republic) Patrik Rikl	7–5, 6–3
Win	5–3	Jan 2025	Australian Open, Australia	Grand Slam	Hard	(Finland) Harri Heliövaara	(Italy) Simone Bolelli (Italy) Andrea Vavassori	6–7^{(16–18)}, 7–6^{(7–5)}, 6–3
Loss	5–4	Mar 2025	Dubai Tennis Championships, UAE	ATP 500	Hard	(Finland) Harri Heliövaara	(India) Yuki Bhambri (Australia) Alexei Popyrin	6–3, 6–7^{(12–14)}, [8–10]
Win	6–4	Sep 2025	China Open, China	ATP 500	Hard	(Finland) Harri Heliövaara	Andrey Rublev; Karen Khachanov	4–6, 6–3, [10–8]
Win	7–4	Nov 2025	Paris Masters, France	ATP 1000	Hard (i)	(Finland) Harri Heliövaara	(United Kingdom) Julian Cash (United Kingdom) Lloyd Glasspool	6–3, 6–4
Win	8–4	Nov 2025	ATP Finals, Italy	ATP Finals	Hard (i)	(Finland) Harri Heliövaara	(United Kingdom) Joe Salisbury (United Kingdom) Neal Skupski	7–5, 6–3
Win	9–4	Jan 2026	Adelaide International, Australia	ATP 250	Hard	(Finland) Harri Heliövaara	(Germany) Kevin Krawietz (Germany) Tim Pütz	6–3, 6–2
Win	10–4	Feb 2026	Qatar Open, Qatar	ATP 500	Hard	(Finland) Harri Heliövaara	(United Kingdom) Julian Cash (United Kingdom) Lloyd Glasspool	6–3, 6–3
Win	11–4	Feb 2026	Dubai Tennis Championships, UAE	ATP 500	Hard	(Finland) Harri Heliövaara	(El Salvador) Marcelo Arévalo (Croatia) Mate Pavić	7–5, 7–5
Loss	11–5	Mar 2026	Miami Open, US	ATP 1000	Hard	(Finland) Harri Heliövaara	(Italy) Simone Bolelli (Italy) Andrea Vavassori	4–6, 2–6
Win	12–5	May 2026	Madrid Open, Spain	ATP 1000	Clay	(Finland) Harri Heliövaara	(Argentina) Guido Andreozzi (France) Manuel Guinard	6–3, 3–6, [10–7]
Loss	12–6	Jun 2026	French Open, France	Grand Slam	Clay	(Finland) Harri Heliövaara	(Spain) Marcel Granollers (Argentina) Horacio Zeballos	4–6, 2–6
Loss	12–7	Jun 2026	Queen's Club Championships, UK	ATP 500	Grass	(Finland) Harri Heliövaara	(El Salvador) Marcelo Arévalo (Croatia) Mate Pavić	2–6, 4–6
Win	13–7	Jul 2026	Wimbledon Championships, UK (2)	Grand Slam	Grass	(Finland) Harri Heliövaara	(El Salvador) Marcelo Arévalo (Croatia) Mate Pavić	7–6^{(7–4)}, 7–6^{(7–3)}

== ATP Challenger and ITF World Tennis Tour finals ==
=== Singles: 4 (1–3) ===
Legend ATP Challenger (0–0) ITF World Tennis Tour (1–3)	Finals by surface Hard (1–2) Clay (0–0) Grass (0–1)

Result	W–L	Date	Tournament	Tier	Surface	Opponent	Score
Loss	0–1	Oct 2021	M15 Ithaca, United States	World Tennis Tour	Hard	(United Kingdom) Charles Broom	7–6^{(7–5)}, 3–6, 4–6
Win	1–1	Nov 2021	M15 Fayetteville, United States	World Tennis Tour	Hard	(United States) Alfredo Perez	7–6^{(7–2)}, 6–3
Loss	1–2	Apr 2022	M25 Nottingham, United Kingdom	World Tennis Tour	Hard	(United States) Brandon Holt	6–7^{(2–7)}, 5–7
Loss	1–3	Jul 2022	M25 Roehampton, United Kingdom	World Tennis Tour	Grass	(United Kingdom) Toby Samuel	4–6, 7–6^{(10–8)}, 4–6

=== Doubles: 29 (21 titles, 8 runner-ups) ===
Legend ATP Challenger (13–5) ITF World Tennis Tour (8–3)	Finals by surface Hard (14–7) Clay (4–0) Grass (3–1) Carpet (0–0)

Result	W–L	Date	Tournament	Tier	Surface	Partner	Opponents	Score
Loss	0–1	Mar 2021	M15 Indore, India	World Tour	Hard	(United Kingdom) Jonathan Binding	(Switzerland) Luca Castelnuovo (Ukraine) Eric Vanshelboim	6–2, 5–7, [9–11]
Win	1–1	Oct 2021	M15 Ithaca, United States	World Tour	Hard	(United Kingdom) Charles Broom	(United States) Eduardo Nava (United States) Nathan Ponwith	7–6^{(8–6)}, 6–3
Loss	1–2	Nov 2021	M15 Fayetteville, United States	World Tour	Hard	(United Kingdom) Charles Broom	(United States) George Goldhoff (Czech Republic) Tadeas Paroulek	4–6, 2–6
Win	2–2	Dec 2021	M15 Heraklion, Greece	World Tour	Hard	(United Kingdom) Charles Broom	(Netherlands) Sidane Pontjodikromo (Germany) Kai Wehnelt	5–7, 6–2, [10–8]
Win	3–2	Feb 2022	M25 Santo Domingo, Dominican Republic	World Tour	Hard	(Australia) Rinky Hijikata	(Chinese Taipei) Hsu Yu-hsiou (Chinese Taipei) Wu Tung-lin	2–6, 7–6^{(7–4)}, [10–3]
Win	4–2	Mar 2022	M25 Santo Domingo, Dominican Republic	World Tour	Hard	(United Kingdom) Mark Whitehouse	(United States) Colin Markes (United States) Keegan Smith	6–4, 6–4
Loss	4–3	Mar 2022	M25 Calabasas, United States	World Tour	Hard	(United Kingdom) Charles Broom	(South Korea) Nam Ji-sung (South Korea) Song Min-kyu	3–6, 6–7^{(4–7)}
Win	5–3	Apr 2022	M25 Nottingham, United Kingdom	World Tour	Hard	(United Kingdom) Julian Cash	(India) Anirudh Chandrasekar (India) Vijay Sundar Prashanth	6–1, 6–4
Win	6–3	May 2022	M25 Nottingham, United Kingdom	World Tour	Hard	(United Kingdom) Julian Cash	(United Kingdom) Charles Broom (United Kingdom) Jan Choinski	7–6^{(7–5)}, 6–2
Win	7–3	May 2022	M25 Nottingham, United Kingdom	World Tour	Hard	(United Kingdom) Julian Cash	(Australia) Omar Jasika (Israel) Edan Leshem	6–3, 5–7, [10–2]
Win	8–3	Jun 2022	Surbiton, United Kingdom	Challenger	Grass	(United Kingdom) Julian Cash	(Kazakhstan) Aleksandr Nedovyesov (Pakistan) Aisam-ul-Haq Qureshi	4–6, 6–3, [11–9]
Loss	8–4	Jun 2022	Nottingham, United Kingdom	Challenger	Grass	(United Kingdom) Julian Cash	(United Kingdom) Jonny O'Mara (United Kingdom) Ken Skupski	6–3, 2–6, [14–16]
Win	9–4	Jun 2022	Ilkley, United Kingdom	Challenger	Grass	(United Kingdom) Julian Cash	(India) Ramkumar Ramanathan (Australia) John-Patrick Smith	7–5, 6–4
Win	10–4	Jul 2022	M25 Roehampton, United Kingdom	World Tour	Grass	(United Kingdom) Julian Cash	(Switzerland) Luca Castelnuovo (Tunisia) Skander Mansouri	walkover
Win	11–4	Aug 2022	Granby, Canada	Challenger	Hard	(United Kingdom) Julian Cash	(France) Jonathan Eysseric (New Zealand) Artem Sitak	6–3, 6–2
Win	12–4	Sep 2022	Columbus, United States	Challenger	Hard (i)	(United Kingdom) Julian Cash	(United Kingdom) Charles Broom (Germany) Constantin Frantzen	6–2, 7–5
Win	13–4	Oct 2022	Fairfield, United States	Challenger	Hard	(United Kingdom) Julian Cash	(India) Anirudh Chandrasekar (India) Vijay Sundar Prashanth	6–3, 6–1
Win	14–4	Oct 2022	Las Vegas, United States	Challenger	Hard	(United Kingdom) Julian Cash	(Germany) Constantin Frantzen (United States) Reese Stalder	6–4, 7–6^{(7–1)}
Win	15–4	Oct 2022	Charlottesville, United States	Challenger	Hard (i)	(United Kingdom) Julian Cash	(United States) Alex Lawson (New Zealand) Artem Sitak	6–2, 6–4
Win	16–4	Nov 2022	Drummondville, Canada	Challenger	Hard (i)	(United Kingdom) Julian Cash	(United Kingdom) Arthur Fery (United Kingdom) Giles Hussey	6–3, 6–3
Win	17–4	Nov 2022	Andria, Italy	Challenger	Hard (i)	(United Kingdom) Julian Cash	(Italy) Francesco Forti (Italy) Marcello Serafini	6–7^{(3–7)}, 6–4, [10–4]
Win	18–4	Dec 2022	Maia, Portugal	Challenger	Clay (i)	(United Kingdom) Julian Cash	(Portugal) Nuno Borges (Portugal) Francisco Cabral	6–3, 3–6, [10–8]
Win	19–4	Apr 2023	Sarasota, United States	Challenger	Clay	(United Kingdom) Julian Cash	(Argentina) Guido Andreozzi (Argentina) Guillermo Durán	7–6^{(7–4)}, 6–4
Loss	19–5	Aug 2023	Stanford, United States	Challenger	Hard	(United Kingdom) Julian Cash	(Ecuador) Diego Hidalgo (Colombia) Cristian Rodríguez	7–6^{(7–1)}, 4–6, [8-10]
Loss	19–6	Oct 2023	Orléans, France	Challenger	Hard (i)	(Australia) John-Patrick Smith	(Germany) Constantin Frantzen (Germany) Hendrik Jebens	6–7^{(5–7)}, 6–7^{(12–14)}
Loss	19–7	Nov 2023	Bergamo, Italy	Challenger	Hard (i)	(Portugal) Francisco Cabral	(United States) Evan King (United States) Brandon Nakashima	4–6, 6–7^{(1–7)}
Loss	19–8	Mar 2024	Phoenix, United States	Challenger	Hard	(Australia) Rinky Hijikata	(France) Sadio Doumbia (France) Fabien Reboul	3–6, 2–6
Win	20–8	Apr 2024	Madrid, Spain	Challenger	Clay	(Finland) Harri Heliövaara	(Argentina) Guido Andreozzi (Mexico) Miguel Ángel Reyes-Varela	7–5, 7–6^{(7–1)}
Win	21–8	May 2024	Turin, Italy	Challenger	Clay	(Finland) Harri Heliövaara	(Germany) Andreas Mies (United Kingdom) Neal Skupski	6–3, 6–3
