= Harri Heliövaara =

Finnish tennis player (born 1989)

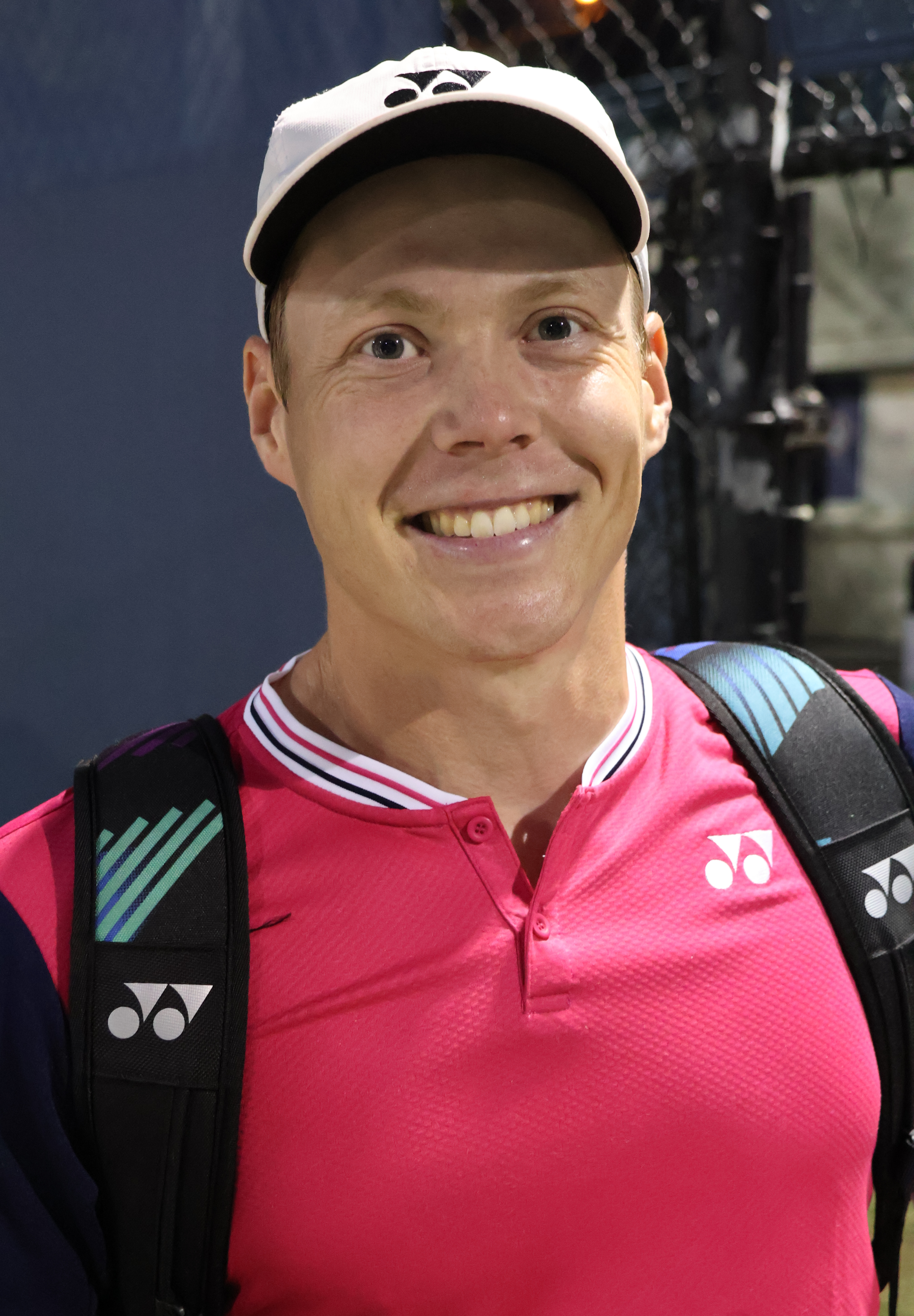
- Heliövaara at the 2023 Washington Open
- Country (sports): Finland
- Residence: Helsinki, Finland
- Born: 4 June 1989 (age 37) Helsinki, Finland
- Height: 1.88 m (6 ft 2 in)
- Turned pro: 2009
- Plays: Right-handed (two-handed backhand)
- Coach: Boris Chernov (2018-)
- Prize money: $ 5,946,532

Singles
- Career record: 9–14 (at ATP Tour level, Grand Slam level, and in Davis Cup)
- Career titles: 0
- Highest ranking: No. 194 (19 December 2011)

Grand Slam singles results
- Australian Open: Q1 (2012)
- French Open: Q1 (2012)
- Wimbledon: Q2 (2012)
- US Open: Q1 (2012)

Doubles
- Career record: 251–122
- Career titles: 17
- Highest ranking: No. 1 (8 June 2026)
- Current ranking: No. 1 (8 June 2026)

Grand Slam doubles results
- Australian Open: W (2025)
- French Open: F (2026)
- Wimbledon: W (2024, 2026)
- US Open: SF (2026)

Other doubles tournaments
- Tour Finals: W (2025)

Mixed doubles
- Career titles: 1

Grand Slam mixed doubles results
- Australian Open: 2R (2025)
- French Open: 2R (2025)
- Wimbledon: 1R (2024, 2025)
- US Open: W (2023)
- Last updated on: 9 November 2026.

Harri Heliövaara (born 4 June 1989) is a Finnish professional tennis player who specializes in doubles. He has been ranked as the world No. 1 in men's doubles by the Association of Tennis Professionals (ATP), achieved in June 2026. He is a four-time major champion, with men's doubles titles at the 2024 and 2026 Wimbledon Championships and at the 2025 Australian Open partnering Henry Patten, and in mixed doubles at the 2023 US Open partnering Anna Danilina.

Heliövaara has won 16 doubles titles on the ATP Tour. He won the 2007 Australian Open boys' doubles title with Graeme Dyce. Heliövaara announced his retirement from professional tennis in 2013 but returned in 2017. He attained a career-high singles ranking of world No. 194 in December 2011.

== Personal life ==
Heliövaara worked outside tennis during his absence from the tour between 2014 and 2017. He interned at McKinsey & Company and also had an office job at Helsinki Airport. He met his wife, Sini, at the airport, where she worked full-time. The couple have two children together, a daughter and a son.

Heliövaara practices tennis at SATA-Tennis Club in Helsinki, and participates on the competitive team, which competes against other Finnish tennis clubs.

Heliövaara was a member of the ATP Player Advisory Council in 2023.

== Career ==
=== 2021: First two titles, Wimbledon third round ===
Partnering Lloyd Glasspool, Heliövaara won his first ATP Tour title at the 2021 Open 13 against Sander Arends and David Pel of the Netherlands in March, and his second at the 2021 Kremlin Cup with Dutch Matwé Middelkoop in October.

=== 2022: Two major quarterfinals, ATP Finals semifinal, top 15 ===
Heliövaara reached two more ATP 250 finals with Glasspool at the Open Sud de France in Lyon and the Dallas Open and entered the top 50 in doubles on 28 February 2022. In May, on their debut at the Italian Open, the pair reached their first quarterfinal at a Masters 1000 as alternates, defeating top seeds Joe Salisbury and Rajeev Ram en route.

At the French Open he reached the quarterfinals of a Grand Slam for the first time in his career with Glasspool. As a result, he moved into the top 40 at World No. 39 on 6 June 2022. The pair continued with their successful season reaching their first final on grass at the Queen's Club Championships. Next they advanced to the third round at Wimbledon for the second consecutive year.

They won their biggest title as partners at the ATP 500 Hamburg European Open defeating Matwé Middelkoop and Rohan Bopanna. As a result, Heliövaara reached the top 25 on 25 July 2022. At the Croatia Open Umag, they reached the semifinals defeating wildcard pair Mili Poljičak and Nino Serdarušić. Next they defeated second seeds Rafael Matos and David Vega Hernández to reach their fifth final this season.

At the Canadian Open the pair reached the quarterfinals of a Masters 1000 for the second time in the season where they lost to third seeds Koolhof/Skupski.

Seeded 11th at the US Open they reached their second quarterfinal of a Grand Slam and first at this Major defeating 8th seeded pair of Kyrgios/Kokkinakis in three sets. The pair reached their sixth final of the season at the Moselle Open. As a result, Heliövaara reached the top 15 in the doubles rankings at World No. 14 on 26 September 2022.

On 4 November the pair qualified for their first ATP Finals after reaching their first Masters 1000 semifinal at the Paris Masters and Heliövaara moved to No. 12 in the rankings. They qualified for the ATP finals semifinals defeating Arévalo/Rojer and Granollers/Zeballos both matches in straight sets.

=== 2023: Masters semifinal, World No. 7, Mixed Major title ===
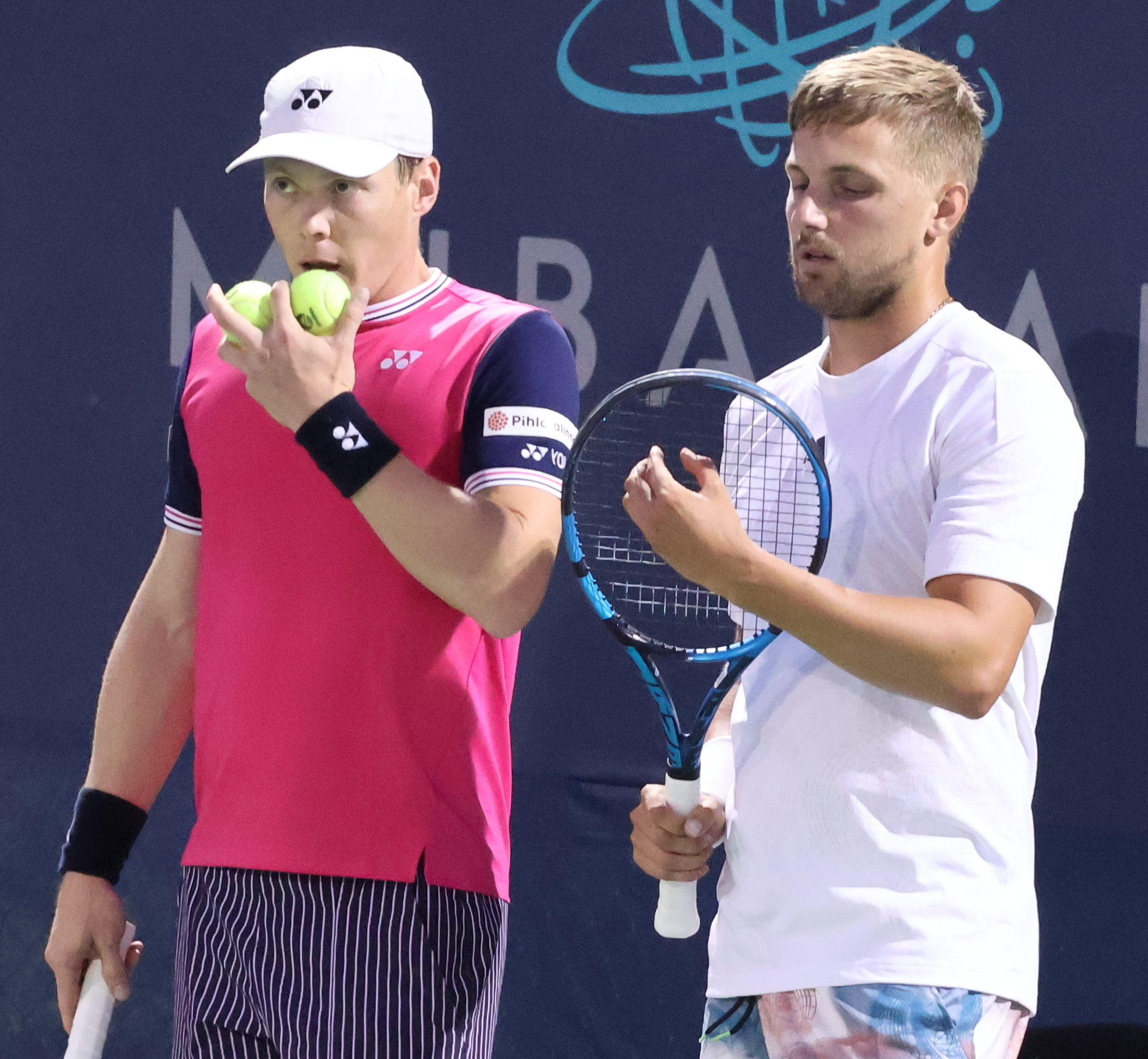
Heliövaara and Lloyd Glasspool at the 2023 DC Open

He won his fourth title with his partner Glasspool in Adelaide and reached the top 10 at No. 9 on 9 January 2023. He also reached his eleventh final in Dubai with Glasspool.

At the sign-in line of the US Open, Heliövaara met Anna Danilina, asked if she wanted a partner for the mixed doubles tournament, and she accepted. The recently formed pair wound up winning the entire event at Flushing Meadows.

=== 2024: Three ATP titles, Wimbledon champion ===
In April, Heliövaara won his fifth title with his new partner Henry Patten at the Grand Prix Hassan II defeating second seeded Austrian duo of Alexander Erler and Lucas Miedler. Heliövaara and Patten also won the Madrid Challenger, defeating Guido Andreozzi and Miguel Angel Reyes-Varela in the final.

In May, Heliövaara and Patten defeated top seeds Andreas Mies and Neal Skupski in the final of the Turin Challenger. Heliövaara reached the final at the Lyon Open partnering also with Patten. The duo won their second ATP Tour title as a team, and sixth for Heliövaara defeating Albano Olivetti and Yuki Bhambri in the final.

Heliövaara and Patten reached the final at Wimbledon, defeating Italian duo Andrea Vavassori and Simone Bolelli, Spanish duo Pedro Martínez and Jaume Munar, and then Marcelo Arévalo and Mate Pavić in the quarterfinals, Neal Skupski and Michael Venus in the semifinals. They defeated Australian duo Jordan Thompson and Max Purcell in the final, in a three-setter with three tiebreaks, saving three match points, to win their first Grand Slam title together.

Heliövaara and Patten were runners-up at the China Open in October, losing in the final to top seeds Simone Bolelli and Andrea Vavassori. The next week they won the Stockholm Open, defeating Petr Nouza and Patrik Rikl in the final. They followed this by reaching the semifinals at the Vienna Open, losing in a deciding tiebreak to wildcards and eventual champions Alexander Erler and Lucas Miedler after squandering two match points.

His place alongside Patten at the ATP Finals was confirmed on 28 October 2024 with the duo having secured a top eight spot in the ATP Doubles Race to qualify.

At the ATP Finals, Heliövaara and Patten defeated world No.1 team Marcel Granollers and Horacio Zeballos in straight sets in their first group match. In their second group match, they defeated US Open champions Jordan Thompson and Max Purcell in straight sets. Heliövaara and Patten then secured first place in their group by winning their third match against Wesley Koolhof and Nikola Mektić in a deciding champions tiebreak. They lost in the semifinals to top seeds Marcelo Arévalo and Mate Pavić in two sets, both of which went to tiebreaks.

=== 2025: Australian and ATP Finals champion, World No. 3, 200th win ===
Alongside Patten, Heliövaara won the doubles title at the Australian Open, defeating third seeds Simone Bolelli and Andrea Vavassori in the final. With the title, Heliövaara became the first Finnish player to win multiple men's doubles major championships. On the way to the final they overcame Rithvik Choudary Bollipalli and Ryan Seggerman, Marc Polmans and Matthew Romios, Austin Krajicek and Rajeev Ram, 15th seeds Hugo Nys and Edouard Roger-Vasselin and fourth seeds Kevin Krawietz and Tim Pütz.

At the Qatar Open, Heliövaara and Patten reached the quarterfinals. They defeated Tallon Griekspoor and Adam Pavlasek in the first round, before defeating Novak Djokovic and Fernando Verdasco in straight sets in what was Verdasco's final match on the ATP Tour. They lost in the semifinal in three sets to Joe Salisbury and Neal Skupski. Seeded second, Heliövaara and Patten were runners-up at the Dubai Tennis Championships in March, losing in the final to Yuki Bhambri and Alexei Popyrin. Again seeded second at the French Open, they lost in the quarterfinals to ninth seeds Evan King and Christian Harrison.

Defending their titles at Wimbledon, Heliövaara and Patten lost in the quarterfinals to Julian Cash and Lloyd Glasspool.

Seeded third, Heliövaara and Patten won the title at the China Open, defeating Karen Khachanov and Andrey Rublev in the final and clinching their place at the end of season Tour finals in the process. At the Paris Masters, they defeated Julian Cash and Lloyd Glasspool in the final to claim their third title of the year.

Heliövaara recorded his 200th win at the 2025 ATP Finals and reached the semifinals stage for a second time with partner Henry Patten. They went on to win the title, defeating Joe Salisbury and Neal Skupski in the final in straight sets.

=== 2026: World No. 1, second Wimbledon title ===
Seeded second, Patten and Heliövaara began their 2026 season by winning the Adelaide International, defeating Kevin Krawietz and Tim Pütz in the final. In February they won back-to-back titles, first at the Qatar Open where they overcame top seeds Julian Cash and Lloyd Glasspool in the championship match, and then at the Dubai Tennis Championships where Marcelo Arévalo and Mate Pavić were their final opponents.

At the Miami Open, Patten and Heliövaara reached their fourth final of the year, but lost to Simone Bolelli and Andrea Vavassori. They made it through to the final at the Madrid Open, and overcame Guido Andreozzi and Manuel Guinard in a deciding champions' tiebreak to claim their fourth title of the season.

Seeded second Patten and Heliövaara were runners-up at the French Open, losing to top seeds and defending champions, Marcel Granollers and Horacio Zeballos, in the final. Despite their defeat, the pair became joint world No. 1 on 8 June 2026..Moving onto the grass court swing of the season, at the Queen's Club Championships, they reached the final but lost to Marcelo Arévalo and Mate Pavić. The two pairs met again in the final at Wimbledon with Patten and Heliövaara coming out on top in straight sets to claim their second title at the event and third major overall as a team.

In September at the US Open, Heliövaara and Patten lost to eventual champions Neal Skupski and Christian Harrison in the semifinals. After a semifinal showing at the Paris Masters in November, he and Patten secured the team year-end No. 1 ranking, with Heliövaara becoming the first Finnish player to achieve the feat. Defending their title at the ATP Finals, they were eliminated in the round-robin stage.

== Career statistics ==
=== Doubles performance timeline ===
Key
W	F	SF	QF	#R	RR	Q#	DNQ	A	NH

(W) winner; (F) finalist; (SF) semifinalist; (QF) quarterfinalist; (#R) rounds 4, 3, 2, 1; (RR) round-robin stage; (Q#) qualification round; (DNQ) did not qualify; (A) absent; (NH) not held; (SR) strike rate (events won / competed); (W–L) win–loss record.
To avoid confusion and double counting, these charts are updated at the conclusion of a tournament or when the player's participation has ended.

Current through the 2026 US Open.

Tournament	2021	2022	2023	2024	2025	2026	SR	W–L
Grand Slam tournaments
Australian Open	A	2R	2R	2R	W	3R	1 / 5	11–4
French Open	A	QF	3R	3R	QF	F	0 / 5	15–4
Wimbledon	3R	3R	A	W	QF (Note: Heliövaara/Patten received a walkover into the quarterfinals, which does not count as a win.)	W	2 / 5	18–2
US Open	1R	QF	2R	3R	1R	SF	0 / 6	10–1
Win–loss	2–1	9–4	4–3	11–2	11–3	17–3	3 / 21	54–16

== Grand Slam tournament finals ==
=== Doubles: 4 (3 titles, 1 runner-up) ===
Outcome	Year	Championship	Surface	Partner	Opponents	Score
Win	2024	Wimbledon	Grass	(United Kingdom) Henry Patten	(Australia) Max Purcell (Australia) Jordan Thompson	6–7^{(7–9)}, 7–6^{(10–8)}, 7–6^{(11–9)}
Win	2025	Australian Open	Hard	(United Kingdom) Henry Patten	(Italy) Simone Bolelli (Italy) Andrea Vavassori	6–7^{(16–18)}, 7–6^{(7–5)}, 6–3
Loss	2026	French Open	Clay	(United Kingdom) Henry Patten	(Spain) Marcel Granollers (Argentina) Horacio Zeballos	4–6, 2–6
Win	2026	Wimbledon (2)	Grass	(United Kingdom) Henry Patten	(Croatia) Mate Pavić (El Salvador) Marcelo Arévalo	7–6^{(7–4)}, 7–6^{(7–3)}

=== Mixed doubles: 1 (1 title) ===
Result	Year	Tournament	Surface	Partner	Opponents	Score
Win	2023	US Open	Hard	(Kazakhstan) Anna Danilina	(United States) Jessica Pegula (United States) Austin Krajicek	6–3, 6–4

== Other finals ==
=== Year-end championships ===
==== Doubles: 1 (1 title) ====
Outcome	Year	Championship	Surface	Partner	Opponents	Score
Win	2025	ATP Finals, Turin	Hard (i)	(United Kingdom) Henry Patten	(United Kingdom) Joe Salisbury (United Kingdom) Neal Skupski	7–5, 6–3

=== ATP Masters 1000 ===
==== Doubles: 3 (2 titles, 1 runner-up) ====
Outcome	Year	Championship	Surface	Partner	Opponents	Score
Win	2025	Paris Masters	Hard (i)	(United Kingdom) Henry Patten	(United Kingdom) Julian Cash (United Kingdom) Lloyd Glasspool	6–3, 6–4
Loss	2026	Miami Open	Hard	(United Kingdom) Henry Patten	(Italy) Simone Bolelli (Italy) Andrea Vavassori	4–6, 2–6
Win	2026	Madrid Open	Clay	(United Kingdom) Henry Patten	(Argentina) Guido Andreozzi (France) Manuel Guinard	6–3, 3–6, [10–7]

== Junior Grand Slam finals ==
=== Doubles: 1 (1 title) ===
Outcome	Year	Championship	Surface	Partner	Opponents	Score
Winner	2007	Australian Open	Hard	(United Kingdom) Graeme Dyce	(Australia) Stephen Donald (India) Rupesh Roy	6–2, 6–7^{(4–7)}, 6–3
