= 2020 French Open – Women's singles qualifying =

Women's singles qualifying
- 2020 French Open

Events
Singles	men	women		boys	girls
Doubles	men	women	mixed	boys	girls
WC Singles	men	women	quad
WC Doubles	men	women	quad
Legends	−45	45+	women

Qualification
Singles	men	women
- French Open

The 2020 French Open – Women's singles qualifying is a series of tennis matches that takes place from 22 September to 25 September 2020 to determine the twelve qualifiers into the main draw of the 2020 French Open – Women's singles, and, if necessary, the lucky losers.

== Seeds ==
1. (United States) Ann Li (second round)
2. (Ukraine) Marta Kostyuk (qualified)
3. (United States) Caty McNally (second round)
4. (Czech Republic) Tereza Martincová (qualifying competition)
5. (Romania) Mihaela Buzărnescu (first round)
6. (Italy) Elisabetta Cocciaretto (second round)
7. (Switzerland) Viktorija Golubic (first round)
8. (Argentina) Nadia Podoroska (qualified)
9. (Australia) Astra Sharma (qualifying competition, lucky loser)
10. (United States) Francesca Di Lorenzo (second round)
11. (Russia) Natalia Vikhlyantseva (first round)
12. (Bulgaria) Viktoriya Tomova (second round)
13. (Ukraine) Lesia Tsurenko (first round)
14. (Slovakia) Kristína Kučová (first round)
15. (United States) Caroline Dolehide (first round)
16. (Romania) Monica Niculescu (qualified)
17. (Austria) Barbara Haas (qualified)
18. (United States) Usue Maitane Arconada (first round)
19. (Switzerland) Leonie Küng (second round)
20. (China) Wang Xinyu (qualifying competition)
21. (United States) Sachia Vickery (first round)
22. (Japan) Kurumi Nara (qualifying competition)
23. (United States) Whitney Osuigwe (first round)
24. (Italy) Sara Errani (qualified)

== Qualifiers ==
1. (Russia) Kamilla Rakhimova
2. (Ukraine) Marta Kostyuk
3. (Egypt) Mayar Sherif
4. (Italy) Sara Errani
5. (Romania) Irina Bara
6. (Denmark) Clara Tauson
7. (United States) Varvara Lepchenko
8. (Argentina) Nadia Podoroska
9. (Italy) Martina Trevisan
10. (Austria) Barbara Haas
11. (Romania) Monica Niculescu
12. (Mexico) Renata Zarazúa

== Lucky loser ==
1. (Australia) Astra Sharma

== Draw ==
=== First qualifier ===
First round
1	(United States) Ann Li	7^{8}	6
(Netherlands) Indy de Vroome	6^{6}	4
(Georgia (country)) Mariam Bolkvadze	2	2
(Russia) Kamilla Rakhimova	6	6
(Serbia) Natalija Kostić	6	5	6
(Netherlands) Bibiane Schoofs	2	7	3
(Turkey) Çağla Büyükakçay	6	5	6
13	(Ukraine) Lesia Tsurenko	2	7	1

Second round
1	(United States) Ann Li	7^{14}	6^{4}	4
(Russia) Kamilla Rakhimova	6^{12}	7^{7}	6
(Serbia) Natalija Kostić	6	2	6
(Turkey) Çağla Büyükakçay	3	6	2

Qualifying competition
(Russia) Kamilla Rakhimova	7	6
(Serbia) Natalija Kostić	5	3

=== Second qualifier ===
First round
2	(Ukraine) Marta Kostyuk	6	3	6
(Bulgaria) Isabella Shinikova	1	6	0
(Romania) Laura Ioana Paar	1	6	6
WC	(France) Margot Yerolymos	6	2	2
(India) Ankita Raina	6	4	6
(Serbia) Jovana Jović	4	6	4
WC	(France) Aubane Droguet	6^{3}	6	2
22	(Japan) Kurumi Nara	7^{7}	3	6

Second round
2	(Ukraine) Marta Kostyuk	6	6
(Romania) Laura Ioana Paar	2	2
(India) Ankita Raina	3	2
22	(Japan) Kurumi Nara	6	6

Qualifying competition
2	(Ukraine) Marta Kostyuk	6	1	6
22	(Japan) Kurumi Nara	0	6	2

=== Third qualifier ===
First round
3	(United States) Caty McNally	5	6	7
(Turkey) Pemra Özgen	7	3	5
(Colombia) Camila Osorio	4	0
(Egypt) Mayar Sherif	6	6
(Italy) Giulia Gatto-Monticone	6	6
WC	(France) Séléna Janicijevic	4	2
WC	(France) Carole Monnet	6	6
23	(United States) Whitney Osuigwe	3	1

Second round
3	(United States) Caty McNally	2	4
(Egypt) Mayar Sherif	6	6
(Italy) Giulia Gatto-Monticone	4	6	6
WC	(France) Carole Monnet	6	3	1

Qualifying competition
(Egypt) Mayar Sherif	6	6
(Italy) Giulia Gatto-Monticone	1	3

=== Fourth qualifier ===
First round
4	(Czech Republic) Tereza Martincová	6	7
(Russia) Valeria Savinykh	3	5
(Belgium) Yanina Wickmayer	4	5
(Netherlands) Lesley Pattinama Kerkhove	6	7
(Spain) Eva Guerrero Álvarez	6	6
(France) Jessika Ponchet	4	4
(Georgia (country)) Ekaterine Gorgodze	2	2
24	(Italy) Sara Errani	6	6

Second round
4	(Czech Republic) Tereza Martincová	6	6
(Netherlands) Lesley Pattinama Kerkhove	2	2
(Spain) Eva Guerrero Álvarez	4	1
24	(Italy) Sara Errani	6	6

Qualifying competition
4	(Czech Republic) Tereza Martincová	3	5
24	(Italy) Sara Errani	6	7

=== Fifth qualifier ===
First round
5	(Romania) Mihaela Buzărnescu	3	0
(United Kingdom) Harriet Dart	6	6
(Romania) Irina Bara	6	6
(Croatia) Tereza Mrdeža	2	2
(Spain) Cristina Bucșa	6	3	4
(Slovakia) Rebecca Šramková	4	6	6
(Netherlands) Richèl Hogenkamp	6	6
14	(Slovakia) Kristína Kučová	1	3

Second round
(United Kingdom) Harriet Dart	5	2
(Romania) Irina Bara	7	6
(Slovakia) Rebecca Šramková	6	1	1
(Netherlands) Richèl Hogenkamp	4	6	6

Qualifying competition
(Romania) Irina Bara	6	7^{7}
(Netherlands) Richèl Hogenkamp	2	6^{4}

=== Sixth qualifier ===
First round
6	(Italy) Elisabetta Cocciaretto	6	6
(Russia) Anastasiya Komardina	4	2
(Denmark) Clara Tauson	7^{7}	1	6
(Romania) Gabriela Talabă	6^{4}	6	2
(Spain) Lara Arruabarrena	4	3
(Serbia) Ivana Jorović	6	6
(Japan) Mayo Hibi	3	7	7
15	(United States) Caroline Dolehide	6	5	5

Second round
6	(Italy) Elisabetta Cocciaretto	1	2
(Denmark) Clara Tauson	6	6
(Serbia) Ivana Jorović	4	6	6
(Japan) Mayo Hibi	6	2	1

Qualifying competition
(Denmark) Clara Tauson	7^{7}	6
(Serbia) Ivana Jorović	6^{5}	4

=== Seventh qualifier ===
First round
7	(Switzerland) Viktorija Golubic	1	3
(Ukraine) Anhelina Kalinina	6	6
(China) You Xiaodi	1	1
(United States) Varvara Lepchenko	6	6
(Croatia) Jana Fett	0	6	4
(Hungary) Dalma Gálfi	6	2	6
(Italy) Martina Di Giuseppe	6	6
18	(United States) Usue Maitane Arconada	2	4

Second round
(Ukraine) Anhelina Kalinina	2	5
(United States) Varvara Lepchenko	6	7
(Hungary) Dalma Gálfi	6	6
(Italy) Martina Di Giuseppe	2	3

Qualifying competition
(United States) Varvara Lepchenko	6	6
(Hungary) Dalma Gálfi	3	4

=== Eighth qualifier ===
First round
8	(Argentina) Nadia Podoroska	6	6
(Poland) Magdalena Fręch	2	2
(Slovakia) Jana Čepelová	2	6^{4}
(Romania) Jaqueline Cristian	6	7^{7}
WC	(France) Tessah Andrianjafitrimo	3	7	6
(Spain) Nuria Párrizas Díaz	6	5	3
(United States) Robin Anderson	4	2
20	(China) Wang Xinyu	6	6

Second round
8	(Argentina) Nadia Podoroska	6	6
(Romania) Jaqueline Cristian	0	4
WC	(France) Tessah Andrianjafitrimo	4	7^{7}	1
20	(China) Wang Xinyu	6	6^{4}	6

Qualifying competition
8	(Argentina) Nadia Podoroska	6	6
20	(China) Wang Xinyu	2	4

=== Ninth qualifier ===
First round
9	(Australia) Astra Sharma	6	6
WC	(France) Irina Ramialison	4	4
WC	(France) Amandine Hesse	7	4	2
(Japan) Yuki Naito	5	6	6
WC	(France) Audrey Albié	3	4
(United States) Asia Muhammad	6	6
(Italy) Martina Trevisan	4	6	6
21	(United States) Sachia Vickery	6	2	3

Second round
9	(Australia) Astra Sharma	6	6
(Japan) Yuki Naito	4	4
(United States) Asia Muhammad	3	4
(Italy) Martina Trevisan	6	6

Qualifying competition
9	(Australia) Astra Sharma	1	1
(Italy) Martina Trevisan	6	6

=== Tenth qualifier ===
First round
10	(United States) Francesca Di Lorenzo	6	6
(Russia) Marina Melnikova	4	0
(Romania) Elena-Gabriela Ruse	7	6
(Russia) Victoria Kan	5	0
(United States) Allie Kiick	2	1
(Austria) Julia Grabher	6	6
(Ukraine) Daria Snigur	0	7	5
17	(Austria) Barbara Haas	6	5	7

Second round
10	(United States) Francesca Di Lorenzo	2	5
(Romania) Elena-Gabriela Ruse	6	7
(Austria) Julia Grabher	3	3
17	(Austria) Barbara Haas	6	6

Qualifying competition
(Romania) Elena-Gabriela Ruse	4	5
17	(Austria) Barbara Haas	6	7

=== Eleventh qualifier ===
First round
11	(Russia) Natalia Vikhlyantseva	1	2
(Russia) Vera Zvonareva	6	6
(Australia) Arina Rodionova	6	7^{7}
(United Kingdom) Samantha Murray Sharan	3	6^{1}
(Bulgaria) Elitsa Kostova	7	3	6
(Brazil) Gabriela Cé	5	6	2
(Japan) Chihiro Muramatsu	2	5
16	(Romania) Monica Niculescu	6	7

Second round
(Russia) Vera Zvonareva	6	6
(Australia) Arina Rodionova	0	4
(Bulgaria) Elitsa Kostova	0	7^{7}	3
16	(Romania) Monica Niculescu	6	6^{1}	6

Qualifying competition
(Russia) Vera Zvonareva	0	6	3
16	(Romania) Monica Niculescu	6	3	6

=== Twelfth qualifier ===
First round
12	(Bulgaria) Viktoriya Tomova	7	6
(Hungary) Réka Luca Jani	5	4
(Mexico) Renata Zarazúa	3	6	6
(Serbia) Olga Danilović	6	4	3
(Chile) Daniela Seguel	7	6
(Germany) Antonia Lottner	5	2
(Slovenia) Dalila Jakupović	5	3
19	(Switzerland) Leonie Küng	7	6

Second round
12	(Bulgaria) Viktoriya Tomova	3	4
(Mexico) Renata Zarazúa	6	6
(Chile) Daniela Seguel	4	6	6
19	(Switzerland) Leonie Küng	6	4	3

Qualifying competition
(Mexico) Renata Zarazúa	6	6
(Chile) Daniela Seguel	3	3
