= 2020 French Open – Men's singles qualifying =

Men's singles qualifying
- 2020 French Open

Events
Singles	men	women		boys	girls
Doubles	men	women	mixed	boys	girls
WC Singles	men	women	quad
WC Doubles	men	women	quad
Legends	−45	45+	women

Qualification
Singles	men	women
- French Open

The 2020 French Open – Men's Singles Qualifying was a series of tennis matches which took place 21–25 September 2020 to determine the sixteen qualifiers into the main draw of the 2020 French Open. Three players also qualified as lucky losers.

== Seeds ==
1. (Brazil) Thiago Seyboth Wild (first round)
2. (Spain) Pedro Martínez (qualified)
3. (Australia) Christopher O'Connell (first round)
4. (Portugal) Pedro Sousa (first round)
5. (Italy) Marco Cecchinato (qualified)
6. (United States) Denis Kudla (first round)
7. (Russia) Aslan Karatsev (qualifying competition)
8. (Japan) Taro Daniel (second round)
9. (Russia) Evgeny Donskoy (first round)
10. (United States) J. J. Wolf (first round)
11. (Japan) Go Soeda (second round)
12. (Australia) Marc Polmans (qualifying competition, lucky loser)
13. (Argentina) Leonardo Mayer (qualifying competition)
14. (Slovakia) Jozef Kovalík (first round)
15. (Chinese Taipei) Jason Jung (qualifying competition, lucky loser)
16. (India) Sumit Nagal (first round)
17. (Germany) Peter Gojowczyk (first round)
18. (Italy) Paolo Lorenzi (first round)
19. (Croatia) Ivo Karlović (second round)
20. (Italy) Federico Gaio (first round)
21. (Germany) Cedrik-Marcel Stebe (first round)
22. (United States) Bradley Klahn (first round)
23. (Switzerland) Henri Laaksonen (qualified)
24. (Argentina) Facundo Bagnis (second round)
25. (Germany) Oscar Otte (second round)
26. (Belarus) Ilya Ivashka (first round)
27. (Netherlands) Tallon Griekspoor (first round)
28. (Egypt) Mohamed Safwat (first round)
29. (India) Prajnesh Gunneswaran (second round)
30. (Peru) Juan Pablo Varillas (first round)
31. (Serbia) Nikola Milojević (qualified)
32. (Slovenia) Blaž Rola (first round)

== Qualifiers ==
1. (Ecuador) Emilio Gómez
2. (Spain) Pedro Martínez
3. (Austria) Jurij Rodionov
4. (United States) Michael Mmoh
5. (Italy) Marco Cecchinato
6. (Canada) Steven Diez
7. (United States) Sebastian Korda
8. (United States) Jack Sock
9. (Switzerland) Henri Laaksonen
10. (France) Benjamin Bonzi
11. (Czech Republic) Tomáš Macháč
12. (United Kingdom) Liam Broady
13. (Serbia) Nikola Milojević
14. (Germany) Daniel Altmaier
15. (Australia) Aleksandar Vukic
16. (Italy) Lorenzo Giustino

== Lucky losers ==
1. (Colombia) Daniel Elahi Galán
2. (Australia) Marc Polmans
3. (Chinese Taipei) Jason Jung

== Draw ==
=== First qualifier ===
First round
1	(Brazil) Thiago Seyboth Wild	3	2
(Ecuador) Emilio Gómez	6	6
(Romania) Marius Copil	2	1
(Slovakia) Filip Horanský	6	6
(Argentina) Andrea Collarini	2	1
(Kazakhstan) Dmitry Popko	6	6
(Slovakia) Lukáš Lacko	6	1	2
25	(Germany) Oscar Otte	4	6	6

Second round
(Ecuador) Emilio Gómez	6	2	6
(Slovakia) Filip Horanský	4	6	4
(Kazakhstan) Dmitry Popko	7	7^{7}
25	(Germany) Oscar Otte	5	6^{5}

Qualifying competition
(Ecuador) Emilio Gómez	2	6	7^{7}
(Kazakhstan) Dmitry Popko	6	4	6^{1}

=== Second qualifier ===
First round
2	(Spain) Pedro Martínez	7	3	6
(Germany) Daniel Masur	5	6	3
(Netherlands) Robin Haase	6	7
(Portugal) João Domingues	1	5
WC	(France) Rayane Roumane	6	3	3
(United States) Ulises Blanch	3	6	6
(Italy) Gian Marco Moroni	6	7^{9}
32	(Slovenia) Blaž Rola	4	6^{7}

Second round
2	(Spain) Pedro Martínez	6	6
(Netherlands) Robin Haase	4	4
(United States) Ulises Blanch	7^{10}	4	6
(Italy) Gian Marco Moroni	6^{8}	6	3

Qualifying competition
2	(Spain) Pedro Martínez	6	6
(United States) Ulises Blanch	2	3

=== Third qualifier ===
First round
3	(Australia) Christopher O'Connell	5	4
(Sweden) Elias Ymer	7	6
(Austria) Sebastian Ofner	4	7	6
(Russia) Alexey Vatutin	6	5	1
(Italy) Matteo Viola	4	6^{3}
(Austria) Jurij Rodionov	6	7^{7}
(Russia) Roman Safiullin	3	6	6
22	(United States) Bradley Klahn	6	2	4

Second round
(Sweden) Elias Ymer	6^{4}	6^{5}
(Austria) Sebastian Ofner	7^{7}	7^{7}
(Austria) Jurij Rodionov	6	6
(Russia) Roman Safiullin	3	2

Qualifying competition
(Austria) Sebastian Ofner	4	6	3
(Austria) Jurij Rodionov	6	3	6

=== Fourth qualifier ===
First round
4	(Portugal) Pedro Sousa	7^{7}	2	4
(Czech Republic) Lukáš Rosol	6^{4}	6	6
(Australia) Alex Bolt	4	3
(United States) Michael Mmoh	6	6
WC	(France) Baptiste Crepatte	6^{7}	4
(South Korea) Chung Hyeon	7^{9}	6
(Argentina) Renzo Olivo	6	6
20	(Italy) Federico Gaio	4	4

Second round
(Czech Republic) Lukáš Rosol	6^{3}	1^{r}
(United States) Michael Mmoh	7^{7}	3
(South Korea) Chung Hyeon	6^{5}	2
(Argentina) Renzo Olivo	7^{7}	6

Qualifying competition
(United States) Michael Mmoh	4	6	6
(Argentina) Renzo Olivo	6	2	3

=== Fifth qualifier ===
First round
5	(Italy) Marco Cecchinato	6	7
(Latvia) Ernests Gulbis	3	5
(Australia) Andrew Harris	1	1
(France) Constant Lestienne	6	6
(Spain) Guillermo García López	6	5	3
(Belgium) Kimmer Coppejans	0	7	6
(Slovakia) Martin Kližan	6	6^{4}	6
17	(Germany) Peter Gojowczyk	2	7^{7}	4

Second round
5	(Italy) Marco Cecchinato	6	6
(France) Constant Lestienne	2	3
(Belgium) Kimmer Coppejans	2	6	6
(Slovakia) Martin Kližan	6	2	4

Qualifying competition
5	(Italy) Marco Cecchinato	6	6
(Belgium) Kimmer Coppejans	1	2

=== Sixth qualifier ===
First round
6	(United States) Denis Kudla	5	6^{2}
(France) Enzo Couacaud	7	7^{7}
(United States) Brandon Nakashima	7	6^{1}	5
(Argentina) Juan Pablo Ficovich	5	7^{7}	7
WC	(France) Geoffrey Blancaneaux	2	5
(United States) Christopher Eubanks	6	7
(Canada) Steven Diez	6	2	6
26	(Belarus) Ilya Ivashka	1	6	4

Second round
(France) Enzo Couacaud	6	6
(Argentina) Juan Pablo Ficovich	3	3
(United States) Christopher Eubanks	2	6^{5}
(Canada) Steven Diez	6	7^{7}

Qualifying competition
(France) Enzo Couacaud	3	4
(Canada) Steven Diez	6	6

=== Seventh qualifier ===
First round
7	(Russia) Aslan Karatsev	6	7
WC	(France) Arthur Cazaux	1	5
WC	(France) Manuel Guinard	4	4
(Australia) Max Purcell	6	6
(United States) Mitchell Krueger	1	4
(United States) Sebastian Korda	6	6
(Canada) Brayden Schnur	6	6
30	(Peru) Juan Pablo Varillas	1	4

Second round
7	(Russia) Aslan Karatsev	6	6
(Australia) Max Purcell	4	1
(United States) Sebastian Korda	6	6
(Canada) Brayden Schnur	4	4

Qualifying competition
7	(Russia) Aslan Karatsev	5	2
(United States) Sebastian Korda	7	6

=== Eighth qualifier ===
First round
8	(Japan) Taro Daniel	6	6
WC	(France) Mathias Bourgue	4	4
PR	(Slovenia) Blaž Kavčič	6	6^{8}	3
PR	(Russia) Andrey Kuznetsov	4	7^{10}	6
(Denmark) Mikael Torpegaard	2	4
PR	(United States) Jack Sock	6	6
(United Kingdom) Jay Clarke	1	4
24	(Argentina) Facundo Bagnis	6	6

Second round
8	(Japan) Taro Daniel	2	6	5
PR	(Russia) Andrey Kuznetsov	6	3	7
PR	(United States) Jack Sock	2	6	7^{7}
24	(Argentina) Facundo Bagnis	6	2	6^{1}

Qualifying competition
PR	(Russia) Andrey Kuznetsov	6^{5}	6^{4}
PR	(United States) Jack Sock	7^{7}	7^{7}

=== Ninth qualifier ===
First round
9	(Russia) Evgeny Donskoy	3	5
(Spain) Mario Vilella Martínez	6	7
(Ukraine) Sergiy Stakhovsky	6^{5}	3
(Colombia) Daniel Elahi Galán	7^{7}	6
(Argentina) Facundo Mena	6	0	7
(United States) Thai-Son Kwiatkowski	2	6	5
(Dominican Republic) Roberto Cid Subervi	3	6^{1}
23	(Switzerland) Henri Laaksonen	6	7^{7}

Second round
(Spain) Mario Vilella Martínez	6^{2}	0
(Colombia) Daniel Elahi Galán	7^{7}	6
(Argentina) Facundo Mena	1	1
23	(Switzerland) Henri Laaksonen	6	6

Qualifying competition
(Colombia) Daniel Elahi Galán	5	1
23	(Switzerland) Henri Laaksonen	7	6

=== Tenth qualifier ===
First round
10	(United States) J. J. Wolf	4	3
(Italy) Roberto Marcora	6	6
WC	(France) Tristan Lamasine	7	6
(India) Ramkumar Ramanathan	5	2
(Czech Republic) Zdeněk Kolář	6	4	5
(France) Benjamin Bonzi	3	6	7
(United States) Noah Rubin	6^{1}	4
19	(Croatia) Ivo Karlović	7^{7}	6

Second round
(Italy) Roberto Marcora	7^{7}	3	6
WC	(France) Tristan Lamasine	6^{4}	6	3
(France) Benjamin Bonzi	6	7^{7}
19	(Croatia) Ivo Karlović	3	6^{3}

Qualifying competition
(Italy) Roberto Marcora
(France) Benjamin Bonzi	w/o

=== Eleventh qualifier ===
First round
11	(Japan) Go Soeda	6	0	7^{7}
WC	(France) Giovanni Mpetshi Perricard	4	6	6^{2}
(Germany) Julian Lenz	2	5
(Czech Republic) Tomáš Macháč	6	7
(Serbia) Viktor Troicki	0	2
(Portugal) Frederico Ferreira Silva	6	6
(Brazil) João Menezes	7^{7}	6
28	(Egypt) Mohamed Safwat	6^{2}	1

Second round
11	(Japan) Go Soeda	3	3
(Czech Republic) Tomáš Macháč	6	6
(Portugal) Frederico Ferreira Silva	7^{7}	7^{7}
(Brazil) João Menezes	6^{4}	6^{2}

Qualifying competition
(Czech Republic) Tomáš Macháč	7^{8}	6
(Portugal) Frederico Ferreira Silva	6^{6}	4

=== Twelfth qualifier ===
First round
12	(Australia) Marc Polmans	6	6
(Germany) Tobias Kamke	2	2
(Serbia) Danilo Petrović	4	6^{8}
(Italy) Alessandro Giannessi	6	7^{10}
(United Kingdom) Liam Broady	6	7^{7}
(Spain) Nicola Kuhn	4	6^{4}
(Netherlands) Botic van de Zandschulp	7^{7}	6
18	(Italy) Paolo Lorenzi	6^{5}	3

Second round
12	(Australia) Marc Polmans	5	6	6
(Italy) Alessandro Giannessi	7	4	3
(United Kingdom) Liam Broady	7^{7}	7^{10}
(Netherlands) Botic van de Zandschulp	6^{5}	6^{8}

Qualifying competition
12	(Australia) Marc Polmans	6^{5}	4
(United Kingdom) Liam Broady	7^{7}	6

=== Thirteenth qualifier ===
First round
13	(Argentina) Leonardo Mayer	7	6
(Canada) Peter Polansky	5	0
Alt	(Italy) Stefano Napolitano	4	5
(Spain) Carlos Taberner	6	7
(Germany) Yannick Maden	4	6	6
(Ukraine) Illya Marchenko	6	2	1
(Japan) Tatsuma Ito	6	0	1
31	(Serbia) Nikola Milojević	4	6	6

Second round
13	(Argentina) Leonardo Mayer	6	6
(Spain) Carlos Taberner	3	3
(Germany) Yannick Maden	6	0	2
31	(Serbia) Nikola Milojević	4	6	6

Qualifying competition
13	(Argentina) Leonardo Mayer	7^{7}	2	3
31	(Serbia) Nikola Milojević	6^{4}	6	6

=== Fourteenth qualifier ===
First round
14	(Slovakia) Jozef Kovalík	2	3
(Belgium) Ruben Bemelmans	6	6
WC	(France) Kyrian Jacquet	6	6
(United States) Maxime Cressy	2	1
(Japan) Hiroki Moriya	6	6
(Germany) Rudolf Molleker	4	4
(Germany) Daniel Altmaier	6	6
27	(Netherlands) Tallon Griekspoor	1	3

Second round
(Belgium) Ruben Bemelmans	6	6
WC	(France) Kyrian Jacquet	4	3
(Japan) Hiroki Moriya	1	2
(Germany) Daniel Altmaier	6	6

Qualifying competition
(Belgium) Ruben Bemelmans	3	6	3
(Germany) Daniel Altmaier	6	1	6

=== Fifteenth qualifier ===
First round
15	(Chinese Taipei) Jason Jung	6	6
(Japan) Yosuke Watanuki	2	0
PR	(Belgium) Arthur De Greef	4	2
(Spain) Tommy Robredo	6	6
(Australia) Aleksandar Vukic	4	7^{7}	6
(Spain) Carlos Alcaraz	6	6^{5}	3
(Turkey) Cem İlkel	3	1
29	(India) Prajnesh Gunneswaran	6	6

Second round
15	(Chinese Taipei) Jason Jung	6	6
(Spain) Tommy Robredo	4	3
(Australia) Aleksandar Vukic	6	7^{7}
29	(India) Prajnesh Gunneswaran	4	6^{4}

Qualifying competition
15	(Chinese Taipei) Jason Jung	3	6	3
(Australia) Aleksandar Vukic	6	3	6

=== Sixteenth qualifier ===
First round
16	(India) Sumit Nagal	6^{4}	5
PR	(Germany) Dustin Brown	7^{7}	7
(France) Alexandre Müller	6	0	6
(Argentina) Marco Trungelliti	3	6	4
(Italy) Lorenzo Giustino	6	5	7^{7}
PR	(Germany) Maximilian Marterer	3	7	6^{1}
(France) Hugo Grenier	3	7	6
21	(Germany) Cedrik-Marcel Stebe	6	5	4

Second round
PR	(Germany) Dustin Brown	3	6	6
(France) Alexandre Müller	6	3	3
(Italy) Lorenzo Giustino	3	6	7
(France) Hugo Grenier	6	4	5

Qualifying competition
PR	(Germany) Dustin Brown	3	5
(Italy) Lorenzo Giustino	6	7
