= 2020 French Open – Wheelchair women's singles =

Wheelchair women's singles
- 2020 French Open

Final
- Champion: (Japan) Yui Kamiji
- Runner-up: (Japan) Momoko Ohtani
- Score: 6–2, 6–1

Events
Singles	men	women		boys	girls
Doubles	men	women	mixed	boys	girls
WC Singles	men	women	quad
WC Doubles	men	women	quad
Legends	−45	45+	women
- French Open

Yui Kamiji defeated Momoko Ohtani in the final, 6–2, 6–1 to win the women's singles wheelchair tennis title at the 2020 French Open.

Diede de Groot was the defending champion, but was defeated by Ohtani in the semifinals. As of the 2024 Wimbledon Championships, this marks de Groot's most recent loss at a grand slam.

== Seeds ==
1. (Netherlands) Diede de Groot (semifinals)
2. (Japan) Yui Kamiji (champion)

== Draw ==
Key

- Q = Qualifier
- WC = Wild card
- LL = Lucky loser
- Alt = Alternate
- ITF = ITF entry
- PR = Protected ranking
- SR = Special ranking
- SE = Special exempt
- JE = Junior exempt
- JR = Junior Accelerator Programme entrant
- CO = College Accelerator Programme entrant
- NG = Next Gen Accelerator Program entrant
- w/o = Walkover
- r = Retired
- d = Defaulted

=== Finals ===
Quarterfinals
1	(Netherlands) Diede de Groot	6	0	6
(United Kingdom) Jordanne Whiley	3	6	1
(South Africa) Kgothatso Montjane	4	1
(Japan) Momoko Ohtani	6	6
WC	(France) Charlotte Famin	4	6	3
(Netherlands) Aniek van Koot	6	4	6
(Netherlands) Marjolein Buis	7^{9}	2	1
2	(Japan) Yui Kamiji	6^{7}	6	6

Semifinals
1	(Netherlands) Diede de Groot	5	4
(Japan) Momoko Ohtani	7	6
(Netherlands) Aniek van Koot	2	2
2	(Japan) Yui Kamiji	6	6

Final
(Japan) Momoko Ohtani	2	1
2	(Japan) Yui Kamiji	6	6
