= 2020 French Open – Boys' doubles =

Boys' doubles
- 2020 French Open

Final
- Champions: (Italy) Flavio Cobolli (Switzerland) Dominic Stricker
- Runners-up: (Brazil) Bruno Oliveira (Brazil) Natan Rodrigues
- Score: 6–2, 6–4

Events
Singles	men	women		boys	girls
Doubles	men	women	mixed	boys	girls
WC Singles	men	women	quad
WC Doubles	men	women	quad
Legends	−45	45+	women
- French Open

Matheus Pucinelli de Almeida and Thiago Agustín Tirante were the defending champions, but both players were no longer eligible to participate in junior events.

Flavio Cobolli and Dominic Stricker won the title, defeating Bruno Oliveira and Natan Rodrigues in the final, 6–2, 6–4.

== Seeds ==
1. (France) Arthur Cazaux / (France) Harold Mayot (withdrew)
2. (Romania) Nicholas David Ionel / (Switzerland) Leandro Riedi (second round)
3. (Italy) Flavio Cobolli / (Switzerland) Dominic Stricker (champions)
4. (Italy) Luciano Darderi / (Brazil) Gustavo Heide (first round)
5. (Ivory Coast) Eliakim Coulibaly / (South Africa) Khololwam Montsi (first round)
6. (Switzerland) Jérôme Kym / (Switzerland) Jeffrey von der Schulenburg (second round)
7. (Poland) Mikołaj Lorens / (Latvia) Kārlis Ozoliņš (quarterfinals, retired)
8. (Brazil) Bruno Oliveira / (Brazil) Natan Rodrigues (final)

== Draw ==
Key

- Q = Qualifier
- WC = Wild card
- LL = Lucky loser
- Alt = Alternate
- ITF = ITF entry
- PR = Protected ranking
- SR = Special ranking
- SE = Special exempt
- JE = Junior exempt
- JR = Junior Accelerator Programme entrant
- CO = College Accelerator Programme entrant
- NG = Next Gen Accelerator Program entrant
- w/o = Walkover
- r = Retired
- d = Defaulted

=== Finals ===
Semifinals
8	(Brazil) Bruno Oliveira (Brazil) Natan Rodrigues	6	6
(Czech Republic) Martin Krumich (Czech Republic) Dalibor Svrčina	2	4
3	(Italy) Flavio Cobolli (Switzerland) Dominic Stricker	6	5	[10]
(France) Lilian Marmousez (France) Giovanni Mpetshi Perricard	3	7	[6]

Final
8	(Brazil) Bruno Oliveira (Brazil) Natan Rodrigues	2	4
3	(Italy) Flavio Cobolli (Switzerland) Dominic Stricker	6	6

=== Top half ===
First round
1	(France) Arthur Cazaux (France) Harold Mayot
(United Kingdom) Arthur Fery (United Kingdom) Felix Gill	w/o
(India) Dev Javia (China) Li Hanwen	4	6	[10]
(Russia) Egor Agafonov (Hungary) Péter Fajta	6	3	[8]
WC	(France) Axel Garcian (France) Max Westphal	6	6
(United States) Dali Blanch (Brazil) Pedro Boscardin Dias	3	3
(Belgium) Alexander Hoogmartens (Japan) Shunsuke Mitsui	5	5
8	(Brazil) Bruno Oliveira (Brazil) Natan Rodrigues	7	7
4	(Italy) Luciano Darderi (Brazil) Gustavo Heide	4	3
(Czech Republic) Martin Krumich (Czech Republic) Dalibor Svrčina	6	6
WC	(France) Antoine Ghibaudo (France) Luca Van Assche	7	7
(Spain) Diego Augusto Barreto Sánchez (Spain) Mario Mansilla Díez	5	5
(United States) Bruno Kuzuhara (Germany) Max Wiskandt	7^{7}	1	[10]
(Romania) Sebastian Gima (Austria) Lukas Neumayer	6^{4}	6	[5]
(Japan) Kokoro Isomura (Denmark) Elmer Møller	1	6^{5}
7	(Poland) Mikołaj Lorens (Latvia) Kārlis Ozoliņš	6	7^{7}

Second round
(United Kingdom) A Fery (United Kingdom) F Gill	7	6
(India) D Javia (China) H Li	5	2
WC	(France) A Garcian (France) M Westphal	5	7^{7}	[6]
8	(Brazil) B Oliveira (Brazil) N Rodrigues	7	6^{4}	[10]
(Czech Republic) M Krumich (Czech Republic) D Svrčina	6	6
WC	(France) A Ghibaudo (France) L Van Assche	3	3
(United States) B Kuzuhara (Germany) M Wiskandt	3	6	[8]
7	(Poland) M Lorens (Latvia) K Ozoliņš	6	1	[10]

Quarterfinals
(United Kingdom) A Fery (United Kingdom) F Gill	4	6	[3]
8	(Brazil) B Oliveira (Brazil) N Rodrigues	6	3	[10]
(Czech Republic) M Krumich (Czech Republic) D Svrčina	7^{7}	0
7	(Poland) M Lorens (Latvia) K Ozoliņš	6^{3}	0^{r}

Semifinals
8	(Brazil) B Oliveira (Brazil) N Rodrigues	6	6
(Czech Republic) M Krumich (Czech Republic) D Svrčina	2	4

=== Bottom half ===
First round
5	(Ivory Coast) Eliakim Coulibaly (South Africa) Khololwam Montsi	1	6^{3}
(France) Térence Atmane (Italy) Leonardo Malgaroli	6	7^{7}
WC	(France) Sean Cuenin (France) Arthur Fils	4	6	[10]
(Belgium) Raphaël Collignon (Netherlands) Guy den Ouden	6	1	[8]
(France) Martin Breysach (France) Mehdi Sadaoui	6^{2}	4
(Spain) Pablo Llamas Ruiz (Argentina) Juan Bautista Torres	7^{7}	6
(Sweden) Måns Dahlberg (Poland) Maks Kaśnikowski	3	0
3	(Italy) Flavio Cobolli (Switzerland) Dominic Stricker	6	6
6	(Switzerland) Jérôme Kym (Switzerland) Jeffrey von der Schulenburg	6	6
(Argentina) Alex Barrena (Belgium) Romain Faucon	3	4
(Serbia) Hamad Međedović (Russia) Marat Sharipov	6	6
WC	(France) Robin Bertrand (Mexico) Rafael Alfonso de Alba Valdés	2	2
(France) Lilian Marmousez (France) Giovanni Mpetshi Perricard	7^{7}	4	[16]
(United States) Alexander Bernard (Venezuela) Lorenzo Claverie	6^{3}	6	[14]
(Italy) Luca Nardi (Italy) Samuel Vincent Ruggeri	6^{3}	3
2	(Romania) Nicholas David Ionel (Switzerland) Leandro Riedi	7^{7}	6

Second round
(France) T Atmane (Italy) L Malgaroli	6	6
WC	(France) S Cuenin (France) A Fils	1	3
(Spain) P Llamas Ruiz (Argentina) JB Torres	6^{0}	6^{7}
3	(Italy) F Cobolli (Switzerland) D Stricker	7^{7}	7^{9}
6	(Switzerland) J Kym (Switzerland) J von der Schulenburg	1	4
(Serbia) H Međedović (Russia) M Sharipov	6	6
(France) L Marmousez (France) G Mpetshi Perricard	6	6
2	(Romania) ND Ionel (Switzerland) L Riedi	4	4

Quarterfinals
(France) T Atmane (Italy) L Malgaroli	2	1
3	(Italy) F Cobolli (Switzerland) D Stricker	6	6
(Serbia) H Međedović (Russia) M Sharipov	6^{2}	0
(France) L Marmousez (France) G Mpetshi Perricard	7^{7}	6

Semifinals
3	(Italy) F Cobolli (Switzerland) D Stricker	6	5	[10]
(France) L Marmousez (France) G Mpetshi Perricard	3	7	[6]
