= 2020 French Open – Wheelchair quad singles =

Wheelchair quad singles
- 2020 French Open

Final
- Champion: (Australia) Dylan Alcott
- Runner-up: (United Kingdom) Andy Lapthorne
- Score: 6–2, 6–2

Events
| Singles | men | women | | boys | girls |
| Doubles | men | women | mixed | boys | girls |
| WC Singles | men | women | quad |
| WC Doubles | men | women | quad |
| Legends | −45 | 45+ | women |
- French Open

Defending champion Dylan Alcott defeated Andy Lapthorne in the final, 6–2, 6–2 to win the quad singles wheelchair tennis title at the 2020 French Open.

== Seeds ==
1. (Australia) Dylan Alcott (champion)
2. (United Kingdom) Andy Lapthorne (final)

== Draw ==
Key

- Q = Qualifier
- WC = Wild card
- LL = Lucky loser
- Alt = Alternate
- ITF = ITF entry
- PR = Protected ranking
- SR = Special ranking
- SE = Special exempt
- JE = Junior exempt
- JR = Junior Accelerator Programme entrant
- CO = College Accelerator Programme entrant
- NG = Next Gen Accelerator Program entrant
- w/o = Walkover
- r = Retired
- d = Defaulted

=== Finals ===
Semifinals
1 | (Australia) Dylan Alcott | 6 | 6
WC | (Netherlands) Sam Schröder | 2 | 4
(United States) David Wagner | 3 | 6 | 3
2 | (United Kingdom) Andy Lapthorne | 6 | 2 | 6

Final
1 | (Australia) Dylan Alcott | 6 | 6
2 | (United Kingdom) Andy Lapthorne | 2 | 2
3rd place match
WC | (Netherlands) Sam Schröder | 6 | 6
(United States) David Wagner | 4 | 3
