= 2020 French Open – Men's singles =

Tennis tournament

Men's singles
- 2020 French Open

Final
- Champion: (Spain) Rafael Nadal
- Runner-up: (Serbia) Novak Djokovic
- Score: 6–0, 6–2, 7–5

Details
- Draw: 128 (16Q / 8WC)
- Seeds: 32

Events
| Singles | men | women | | boys | girls |
| Doubles | men | women | mixed | boys | girls |
| WC Singles | men | women | quad |
| WC Doubles | men | women | quad |
| Legends | −45 | 45+ | women |
- French Open

Three-time defending champion Rafael Nadal defeated Novak Djokovic in the final, 6–0, 6–2, 7–5 to win the men's singles tennis title at the 2020 French Open. It was his record-extending 13th French Open title and 20th major title overall, equaling Roger Federer's all-time record of men's singles titles. For an Open Era record fourth time in his career, Nadal did not lose a set during the tournament (following 2008, 2010, and 2017). For the first time in French Open history, neither the men's nor women's singles champions lost a set during their tournaments. Nadal also became the first player, male or female, to win 100 matches at the French Open, and only the second man, after Federer at the Australian Open and Wimbledon, to win 100 matches at the same major.

Djokovic was attempting to become the first man in the Open Era to achieve a double career Grand Slam, a feat he would accomplish the following year. Instead, he suffered his worst-ever defeat in a major final, winning only seven games and suffering his first, and only bagel (0–6 set).

Taylor Fritz and Lorenzo Sonego played the longest tiebreak in French Open history in the third round: Sonego won the third set tiebreak 19–17.

Jannik Sinner was the first man to reach the quarterfinals on his tournament debut since Nadal won in 2005, and the youngest quarterfinalist since Djokovic in 2006. He was the first man born in the 21st century to reach a major quarterfinal.

Nadal and Sinner's quarterfinal match was the first men's match to start at night in French Open history. Their match, played under cold and windy conditions, started after 10:00 pm CEST and finished at 1:26 am, the first French Open match to finish after midnight.

== Seeds ==
All seedings per ATP rankings.

1. (Serbia) Novak Djokovic (final)
2. (Spain) Rafael Nadal (champion)
3. (Austria) Dominic Thiem (quarterfinals)
4. (Russia) Daniil Medvedev (first round)
5. (Greece) Stefanos Tsitsipas (semifinals)
6. (Germany) Alexander Zverev (fourth round)
7. (Italy) Matteo Berrettini (third round)
8. (France) Gaël Monfils (first round)
9. (Canada) Denis Shapovalov (second round)
10. (Spain) Roberto Bautista Agut (third round)
11. (Belgium) David Goffin (first round)
12. (Argentina) Diego Schwartzman (semifinals)
13. (Russia) Andrey Rublev (quarterfinals)
14. (Italy) Fabio Fognini (first round)
15. (Russia) Karen Khachanov (fourth round)
16. (Switzerland) Stan Wawrinka (third round)

17. (Spain) Pablo Carreño Busta (quarterfinals)
18. (Bulgaria) Grigor Dimitrov (fourth round)
19. (Canada) Félix Auger-Aliassime (first round)
20. (Chile) Cristian Garín (third round)
21. (United States) John Isner (second round)
22. (Serbia) Dušan Lajović (second round)
23. (France) Benoît Paire (second round)
24. (Croatia) Borna Ćorić (first round)
25. (Australia) Alex de Minaur (first round)
26. (Serbia) Filip Krajinović (first round)
27. (United States) Taylor Fritz (third round)
28. (Norway) Casper Ruud (third round)
29. (Poland) Hubert Hurkacz (first round)
30. (Germany) Jan-Lennard Struff (second round)
31. (Georgia (country)) Nikoloz Basilashvili (first round)
32. (United Kingdom) Dan Evans (first round)

Click on the seed number of a player to go to their draw section.

== Draw ==
Key

- Q = Qualifier
- WC = Wild card
- LL = Lucky loser
- Alt = Alternate
- ITF = ITF entry
- PR = Protected ranking
- SR = Special ranking
- SE = Special exempt
- JE = Junior exempt
- JR = Junior Accelerator Programme entrant
- CO = College Accelerator Programme entrant
- NG = Next Gen Accelerator Program entrant
- w/o = Walkover
- r = Retired
- d = Defaulted

=== Finals ===
Quarterfinals
1 | (Serbia) Novak Djokovic | 4 | 6 | 6 | 6
17 | (Spain) Pablo Carreño Busta | 6 | 2 | 3 | 4
13 | (Russia) Andrey Rublev | 5 | 2 | 3
5 | (Greece) Stefanos Tsitsipas | 7 | 6 | 6
12 | (Argentina) Diego Schwartzman | 7^{7} | 5 | 6^{6} | 7^{7} | 6
3 | (Austria) Dominic Thiem | 6^{1} | 7 | 7^{8} | 6^{5} | 2
(Italy) Jannik Sinner | 6^{4} | 4 | 1
2 | (Spain) Rafael Nadal | 7^{7} | 6 | 6

Semifinals
1 | (Serbia) Novak Djokovic | 6 | 6 | 5 | 4 | 6
5 | (Greece) Stefanos Tsitsipas | 3 | 2 | 7 | 6 | 1
12 | (Argentina) Diego Schwartzman | 3 | 3 | 6^{0}
2 | (Spain) Rafael Nadal | 6 | 6 | 7^{7}

Final
1 | (Serbia) Novak Djokovic | 0 | 2 | 5
2 | (Spain) Rafael Nadal | 6 | 6 | 7

=== Top half ===
==== Section 1 ====
First round
1 | (Serbia) N Djokovic | 6 | 6 | 6
(Sweden) M Ymer | 0 | 2 | 3
(Bolivia) H Dellien | 1 | 4 | 4
(Lithuania) R Berankis | 6 | 6 | 6
LL | (Colombia) DE Galán | 4 | 6 | 5 | 6 | 6
(United Kingdom) C Norrie | 6 | 3 | 7 | 1 | 1
(United States) T Sandgren | 7 | 2 | 4 | 7^{7} | 11
29 | (Poland) H Hurkacz | 5 | 6 | 6 | 6^{1} | 9
20 | (Chile) C Garín | 6 | 4 | 6 | 6
(Germany) P Kohlschreiber | 4 | 6 | 1 | 4
(France) U Humbert | 2 | 2 | 6 | 3
LL | (Australia) M Polmans | 6 | 6 | 3 | 6
(Czech Republic) J Veselý | 6 | 5 | 6 | 6
Q | (United Kingdom) L Broady | 2 | 7 | 3 | 2
PR | (Poland) K Majchrzak | 6^{3} | 3 | 3
15 | (Russia) K Khachanov | 7^{7} | 6 | 6

Second round
1 | (Serbia) N Djokovic | 6 | 6 | 6
(Lithuania) R Berankis | 1 | 2 | 2
LL | (Colombia) DE Galán | 6 | 6 | 6
(United States) T Sandgren | 2 | 2 | 3
20 | (Chile) C Garín | 6^{5} | 6 | 7^{7} | 6
LL | (Australia) M Polmans | 7^{7} | 2 | 6^{3} | 4
(Czech Republic) J Veselý | 1 | 7^{7} | 6^{7} | 6^{2}
15 | (Russia) K Khachanov | 6 | 6^{4} | 7^{9} | 7^{7}

Third round
1 | (Serbia) N Djokovic | 6 | 6 | 6
LL | (Colombia) DE Galán | 0 | 3 | 2
20 | (Chile) C Garín | 2 | 6 | 4 | 2
15 | (Russia) K Khachanov | 6 | 3 | 6 | 6

Fourth round
1 | (Serbia) N Djokovic | 6 | 6 | 6
15 | (Russia) K Khachanov | 4 | 3 | 3

==== Section 2 ====
First round
10 | (Spain) R Bautista Agut | 7^{7} | 6 | 6
(France) R Gasquet | 6^{5} | 2 | 1
(Japan) Y Uchiyama | 2 | 3 | 5
(Hungary) A Balázs | 6 | 6 | 7
(Argentina) G Pella | 7^{8} | 6^{4} | 7 | 6
(Italy) S Caruso | 6^{6} | 7^{7} | 5 | 4
(Australia) J Millman | 3 | 2 | 5
17 | (Spain) P Carreño Busta | 6 | 6 | 7
30 | (Germany) J-L Struff | 3 | 7^{7} | 6 | 6^{2} | 6
(United States) F Tiafoe | 6 | 6^{5} | 3 | 7^{7} | 3
Q | (Germany) D Altmaier | 7^{7} | 6 | 6
(Spain) F López | 6^{1} | 4 | 4
(South Africa) L Harris | 6 | 6 | 7^{9}
(Australia) A Popyrin | 4 | 4 | 6^{7}
(Canada) V Pospisil | 3 | 1 | 3
7 | (Italy) M Berrettini | 6 | 6 | 6

Second round
10 | (Spain) R Bautista Agut | 6 | 6 | 6
(Hungary) A Balázs | 3 | 1 | 2
(Argentina) G Pella | 3 | 2 | 1
17 | (Spain) P Carreño Busta | 6 | 6 | 6
30 | (Germany) J-L Struff | 3 | 6^{4} | 3
Q | (Germany) D Altmaier | 6 | 7^{7} | 6
(South Africa) L Harris | 4 | 6 | 2 | 3
7 | (Italy) M Berrettini | 6 | 4 | 6 | 6

Third round
10 | (Spain) R Bautista Agut | 4 | 3 | 7 | 4
17 | (Spain) P Carreño Busta | 6 | 6 | 5 | 6
Q | (Germany) D Altmaier | 6 | 7^{7} | 6
7 | (Italy) M Berrettini | 2 | 6^{5} | 4

Fourth round
17 | (Spain) P Carreño Busta | 6 | 7 | 6
Q | (Germany) D Altmaier | 2 | 5 | 2

==== Section 3 ====
First round
4 | (Russia) D Medvedev | 4 | 6^{3} | 6 | 1
(Hungary) M Fucsovics | 6 | 7^{7} | 2 | 6
(France) A Mannarino | 4 | 3 | 0
(Spain) A Ramos Viñolas | 6 | 6 | 6
WC | (France) Q Halys | 5 | 6 | 7^{7} | 5 | 6
(United States) M Giron | 7 | 3 | 6^{5} | 7 | 8
(Brazil) T Monteiro | 7 | 6 | 6
31 | (Georgia (country)) N Basilashvili | 5 | 4 | 2
22 | (Serbia) D Lajović | 6 | 7^{7} | 4 | 6
(Italy) G Mager | 4 | 6^{4} | 6 | 1
(Serbia) L Đere | 2 | 3 | 4
PR | (South Africa) K Anderson | 6 | 6 | 6
WC | (France) H Mayot | 6^{5} | 3 | 5
(Spain) A Davidovich Fokina | 7^{7} | 6 | 7
(United States) S Querrey | 7^{7} | 7^{7} | 5 | 4 | 3
13 | (Russia) A Rublev | 6^{5} | 6^{4} | 7 | 6 | 6

Second round
(Hungary) M Fucsovics | 7^{7} | 6 | 7
(Spain) A Ramos Viñolas | 6^{2} | 3 | 5
(United States) M Giron | 6^{5} | 4 | 1
(Brazil) T Monteiro | 7^{7} | 6 | 6
22 | (Serbia) D Lajović | 2 | 4 | 6 | 6 | 3
PR | (South Africa) K Anderson | 6 | 6 | 4 | 3 | 6
(Spain) A Davidovich Fokina | 5 | 1 | 6 | 1
13 | (Russia) A Rublev | 7 | 6 | 3 | 6

Third round
(Hungary) M Fucsovics | 7 | 6 | 6
(Brazil) T Monteiro | 5 | 1 | 3
PR | (South Africa) K Anderson | 3 | 2 | 3
13 | (Russia) A Rublev | 6 | 6 | 6

Fourth round
(Hungary) M Fucsovics | 7^{7} | 5 | 4 | 6^{3}
13 | (Russia) A Rublev | 6^{4} | 7 | 6 | 7^{7}

==== Section 4 ====
First round
9 | (Canada) D Shapovalov | 6 | 7 | 5 | 6
(France) G Simon | 2 | 5 | 7 | 3
(United States) S Johnson | 1 | 1 | 0
(Spain) R Carballés Baena | 6 | 6 | 6
(Slovakia) A Martin | 7 | 6 | 6
(Portugal) J Sousa | 5 | 1 | 2
(France) G Barrère | 3 | 2 | 2
18 | (Bulgaria) G Dimitrov | 6 | 6 | 6
26 | (Serbia) F Krajinović | 4 | 6 | 3 | 1
Q | (Serbia) N Milojević | 6 | 3 | 6 | 6
(Slovenia) A Bedene | 6 | 6^{7} | 6 | 6
WC | (France) A Rinderknech | 2 | 7^{9} | 4 | 4
Q | (Switzerland) H Laaksonen | 1 | 6 | 4 | 2
(Uruguay) P Cuevas | 6 | 2 | 6 | 6
(Spain) J Munar | 6 | 6 | 1 | 4 | 4
5 | (Greece) S Tsitsipas | 4 | 2 | 6 | 6 | 6

Second round
9 | (Canada) D Shapovalov | 5 | 7^{7} | 3 | 6 | 6
(Spain) R Carballés Baena | 7 | 6^{5} | 6 | 3 | 8
(Slovakia) A Martin | 4 | 6^{5} | 1
18 | (Bulgaria) G Dimitrov | 6 | 7^{7} | 6
Q | (Serbia) N Milojević | 5 | 6 | 1 | 6^{4}
(Slovenia) A Bedene | 7 | 2 | 6 | 7^{7}
(Uruguay) P Cuevas | 1 | 4 | 2
5 | (Greece) S Tsitsipas | 6 | 6 | 6

Third round
(Spain) R Carballés Baena | 1 | 3 | 0^{r}
18 | (Bulgaria) G Dimitrov | 6 | 6 | 0
(Slovenia) A Bedene | 1 | 2 | 1^{r}
5 | (Greece) S Tsitsipas | 6 | 6 | 3

Fourth round
18 | (Bulgaria) G Dimitrov | 3 | 6^{9} | 2
5 | (Greece) S Tsitsipas | 6 | 7^{11} | 6

=== Bottom half ===
==== Section 5 ====
First round
8 | (France) G Monfils | 4 | 5 | 6 | 3
(Kazakhstan) A Bublik | 6 | 7 | 3 | 6
Q | (Ecuador) E Gómez | 7^{8} | 3 | 1 | 7^{7} | 3
(Italy) L Sonego | 6^{6} | 6 | 6 | 6^{4} | 6
(Australia) J Thompson | 2 | 4 | 1
(Moldova) R Albot | 6 | 6 | 6
Q | (Czech Republic) T Macháč | 5 | 6^{2} | 6 | 6 | 3
27 | (United States) T Fritz | 7 | 7^{7} | 1 | 2 | 6
24 | (Croatia) B Ćorić | 4 | 6 | 3 | 4
(Slovakia) N Gombos | 6 | 3 | 6 | 6
Q | (Austria) J Rodionov | 3 | 4 | 7^{8} | 6 | 10
(France) J Chardy | 6 | 6 | 6^{6} | 4 | 8
(France) C Moutet | 6 | 6^{7} | 6^{3} | 6 | 16
Q | (Italy) L Giustino | 0 | 7^{9} | 7^{7} | 2 | 18
(Serbia) M Kecmanović | 0 | 1 | 3
12 | (Argentina) D Schwartzman | 6 | 6 | 6

Second round
(Kazakhstan) A Bublik | 6^{8} | 1 | 5
(Italy) L Sonego | 7^{10} | 6 | 7
(Moldova) R Albot | 3 | 2 | 4
27 | (United States) T Fritz | 6 | 6 | 6
(Slovakia) N Gombos | 6 | 2 | 7^{7} | 6
Q | (Austria) J Rodionov | 2 | 6 | 6^{4} | 4
Q | (Italy) L Giustino | 1 | 5 | 0
12 | (Argentina) D Schwartzman | 6 | 7 | 6

Third round
(Italy) L Sonego | 7^{7} | 6 | 7^{19}
27 | (United States) T Fritz | 6^{5} | 3 | 6^{17}
(Slovakia) N Gombos | 6^{3} | 3 | 3
12 | (Argentina) D Schwartzman | 7^{7} | 6 | 6

Fourth round
(Italy) L Sonego | 1 | 3 | 4
12 | (Argentina) D Schwartzman | 6 | 6 | 6

==== Section 6 ====
First round
16 | (Switzerland) S Wawrinka | 6 | 6 | 6
WC | (United Kingdom) A Murray | 1 | 3 | 2
(Germany) D Koepfer | 6 | 3 | 6 | 6
WC | (France) A Hoang | 2 | 6 | 1 | 1
WC | (France) H Gaston | 7^{7} | 6 | 6
WC | (France) M Janvier | 6^{5} | 4 | 3
(Japan) Y Nishioka | 7 | 6 | 6
19 | (Canada) F Auger-Aliassime | 5 | 3 | 3
28 | (Norway) C Ruud | 6 | 6 | 6
(Japan) Y Sugita | 1 | 3 | 1
(United States) T Paul | 6 | 6 | 6
(Australia) J Duckworth | 2 | 3 | 2
(United States) R Opelka | 4 | 4 | 3
Q | (United States) J Sock | 6 | 6 | 6
(Croatia) M Čilić | 4 | 3 | 3
3 | (Austria) D Thiem | 6 | 6 | 6

Second round
16 | (Switzerland) S Wawrinka | 6 | 6 | 3 | 6
(Germany) D Koepfer | 3 | 2 | 6 | 1
WC | (France) H Gaston | 6 | 7^{7} | 3 | 6
(Japan) Y Nishioka | 4 | 6^{4} | 6 | 2
28 | (Norway) C Ruud | 6 | 1 | 6 | 1 | 6
(United States) T Paul | 1 | 6 | 3 | 6 | 3
Q | (United States) J Sock | 1 | 3 | 6^{6}
3 | (Austria) D Thiem | 6 | 6 | 7^{8}

Third round
16 | (Switzerland) S Wawrinka | 6 | 3 | 3 | 6 | 0
WC | (France) H Gaston | 2 | 6 | 6 | 4 | 6
28 | (Norway) C Ruud | 4 | 3 | 1
3 | (Austria) D Thiem | 6 | 6 | 6

Fourth round
WC | (France) H Gaston | 4 | 4 | 7 | 6 | 3
3 | (Austria) D Thiem | 6 | 6 | 5 | 3 | 6

==== Section 7 ====
First round
6 | (Germany) A Zverev | 7 | 6 | 6
(Austria) D Novak | 5 | 2 | 4
Q | (United States) M Mmoh | 3 | 2 | 3
(France) P-H Herbert | 6 | 6 | 6
(Argentina) F Delbonis | 4 | 6^{1} | 6 | 6 | 12
(Argentina) JI Londero | 6 | 7^{7} | 2 | 1 | 14
Q | (Italy) M Cecchinato | 7^{11} | 6 | 6
25 | (Australia) A de Minaur | 6^{9} | 4 | 0
23 | (France) B Paire | 7 | 6 | 6
(South Korea) S-w Kwon | 5 | 4 | 4
(Argentina) F Coria | 7 | 7^{8} | 7^{7}
LL | (Chinese Taipei) J Jung | 5 | 6^{6} | 6^{3}
Q | (France) B Bonzi | 6 | 6 | 4 | 6
(Finland) E Ruusuvuori | 2 | 4 | 6 | 4
(Italy) J Sinner | 7 | 6 | 6
11 | (Belgium) D Goffin | 5 | 0 | 3

Second round
6 | (Germany) A Zverev | 2 | 6 | 7^{7} | 4 | 6
(France) P-H Herbert | 6 | 4 | 6^{5} | 6 | 4
(Argentina) JI Londero | 3 | 2 | 7 | 2
Q | (Italy) M Cecchinato | 6 | 6 | 5 | 6
23 | (France) B Paire | 6^{3} | 6 | 3 | 1
(Argentina) F Coria | 7^{7} | 4 | 6 | 6
Q | (France) B Bonzi | 2 | 4 | 4
(Italy) J Sinner | 6 | 6 | 6

Third round
6 | (Germany) A Zverev | 6 | 7 | 6
Q | (Italy) M Cecchinato | 1 | 5 | 3
(Argentina) F Coria | 3 | 5 | 5
(Italy) J Sinner | 6 | 7 | 7

Fourth round
6 | (Germany) A Zverev | 3 | 3 | 6 | 3
(Italy) J Sinner | 6 | 6 | 4 | 6

==== Section 8 ====
First round
14 | (Italy) F Fognini | 5 | 6 | 6^{1} | 0
(Kazakhstan) M Kukushkin | 7 | 3 | 7^{7} | 6
Q | (Spain) P Martínez | 7 | 6 | 6
Q | (Australia) A Vukic | 5 | 4 | 0
Q | (United States) S Korda | 6 | 4 | 6 | 6
(Italy) A Seppi | 2 | 6 | 3 | 3
WC | (France) E Benchetrit | 4 | 1 | 3
21 | (United States) J Isner | 6 | 6 | 6
32 | (United Kingdom) D Evans | 6 | 1 | 6^{3} | 6 | 4
(Japan) K Nishikori | 1 | 6 | 7^{7} | 1 | 6
(Spain) P Andújar | 3 | 4 | 4
(Italy) S Travaglia | 6 | 6 | 6
Q | (Canada) S Diez | 6 | 3 | 3 | 4
PR | (United States) M McDonald | 4 | 6 | 6 | 6
(Belarus) E Gerasimov | 4 | 4 | 2
2 | (Spain) R Nadal | 6 | 6 | 6

Second round
(Kazakhstan) M Kukushkin | 3 | 1 | 0
Q | (Spain) P Martínez | 6 | 6 | 6
Q | (United States) S Korda | 6 | 6 | 2 | 6
21 | (United States) J Isner | 4 | 4 | 6 | 4
(Japan) K Nishikori | 4 | 6 | 6^{7} | 6 | 2
(Italy) S Travaglia | 6 | 2 | 7^{9} | 4 | 6
PR | (United States) M McDonald | 1 | 0 | 3
2 | (Spain) R Nadal | 6 | 6 | 6

Third round
Q | (Spain) P Martínez | 4 | 3 | 1
Q | (United States) S Korda | 6 | 6 | 6
(Italy) S Travaglia | 1 | 4 | 0
2 | (Spain) R Nadal | 6 | 6 | 6

Fourth round
Q | (United States) S Korda | 1 | 1 | 2
2 | (Spain) R Nadal | 6 | 6 | 6

== Other entry information ==
=== Wild cards ===
- (France) Elliot Benchetrit
- (France) Hugo Gaston
- (France) Quentin Halys
- (France) Antoine Hoang
- (France) Maxime Janvier
- (France) Harold Mayot
- (United Kingdom) Andy Murray
- (France) Arthur Rinderknech

=== Protected ranking ===
- (South Africa) Kevin Anderson (14)
- (Poland) Kamil Majchrzak (105)
- (United States) Mackenzie McDonald (83)

=== Qualifiers ===
- (Germany) Daniel Altmaier
- (France) Benjamin Bonzi
- (United Kingdom) Liam Broady
- (Italy) Marco Cecchinato
- (Canada) Steven Diez
- (Italy) Lorenzo Giustino
- (Ecuador) Emilio Gómez
- (United States) Sebastian Korda
- (Switzerland) Henri Laaksonen
- (Czech Republic) Tomáš Macháč
- (Spain) Pedro Martínez
- (Serbia) Nikola Milojević
- (United States) Michael Mmoh
- (Austria) Jurij Rodionov
- (United States) Jack Sock
- (Australia) Aleksandar Vukic

=== Lucky losers ===
- (Colombia) Daniel Elahi Galán
- (Chinese Taipei) Jason Jung
- (Australia) Marc Polmans

=== Withdrawals ===
- (United Kingdom) Kyle Edmund → replaced by (Colombia) Daniel Elahi Galán
- (Switzerland) Roger Federer → replaced by (Argentina) Federico Coria
- (Australia) Nick Kyrgios → replaced by (Slovakia) Norbert Gombos
- (France) Lucas Pouille → replaced by (Poland) Kamil Majchrzak
- (Canada) Milos Raonic → replaced by (Chinese Taipei) Jason Jung
- (France) Jo-Wilfried Tsonga → replaced by (Spain) Jaume Munar
- (Spain) Fernando Verdasco → replaced by (Australia) Marc Polmans

| Preceded by 2020 US Open – Men's singles | Grand Slam men's singles | Succeeded by 2021 Australian Open – Men's singles |
