= 2020 French Open – Women's doubles =

Women's doubles
- 2020 French Open

Final
- Champions: (Hungary) Tímea Babos (France) Kristina Mladenovic
- Runners-up: (Chile) Alexa Guarachi (United States) Desirae Krawczyk
- Score: 6–4, 7–5

Details
- Draw: 64
- Seeds: 16

Events
Singles	men	women		boys	girls
Doubles	men	women	mixed	boys	girls
WC Singles	men	women	quad
WC Doubles	men	women	quad
Legends	−45	45+	women
← 2019 ·	French Open	· 2021 →

Defending champions Tímea Babos and Kristina Mladenovic defeated Alexa Guarachi and Desirae Krawczyk in the final, 6–4, 7–5 to win the women's doubles tennis title at the 2020 French Open.

== Seeds ==
1. (Chinese Taipei) Hsieh Su-wei / (Czech Republic) Barbora Strýcová (third round)
2. (Hungary) Tímea Babos / (France) Kristina Mladenovic (champions)
3. (Belgium) Elise Mertens / (Belarus) Aryna Sabalenka (second round)
4. (Czech Republic) Barbora Krejčíková / (Czech Republic) Kateřina Siniaková (semifinals)
5. (Canada) Gabriela Dabrowski / (Latvia) Jeļena Ostapenko (third round)
6. (Czech Republic) Květa Peschke / (Netherlands) Demi Schuurs (third round)
7. (Japan) Shuko Aoyama / (Japan) Ena Shibahara (quarterfinals)
8. (Russia) Veronika Kudermetova / (China) Zhang Shuai (third round)

9. (United States) Sofia Kenin / (United States) Bethanie Mattek-Sands (quarterfinals)
10. (United States) Hayley Carter / (Brazil) Luisa Stefani (third round)
11. (Czech Republic) Lucie Hradecká / (Slovenia) Andreja Klepač (first round)
12. (Germany) Laura Siegemund / (Russia) Vera Zvonareva (second round, retired)
13. (Slovakia) Viktória Kužmová / (Czech Republic) Kristýna Plíšková (third round)
14. (Chile) Alexa Guarachi / (United States) Desirae Krawczyk (final)
15. (Ukraine) Lyudmyla Kichenok / (Ukraine) Nadiia Kichenok (first round)
16. (United States) Coco Gauff / (United States) Caty McNally (third round)

Click on the seed number of a player to go to their draw section.

== Draw ==
=== Key ===
- Q = Qualifier
- WC = Wild card
- LL = Lucky loser
- Alt = Alternate
- SE = Special exempt
- PR = Protected ranking
- ITF = ITF entry
- JE = Junior exempt
- w/o = Walkover
- r = Retired
- d = Defaulted
- SR = Special ranking

=== Finals ===
Quarterfinals
14	(Chile) Alexa Guarachi (United States) Desirae Krawczyk	6	6
7	(Japan) Shuko Aoyama (Japan) Ena Shibahara	0	4
(United States) Asia Muhammad (United States) Jessica Pegula	3	4
(United States) Nicole Melichar (Poland) Iga Świątek	6	6
9	(United States) Sofia Kenin (United States) Bethanie Mattek-Sands	6	4	2
4	(Czech Republic) Barbora Krejčíková (Czech Republic) Kateřina Siniaková	1	6	6
(Ukraine) Marta Kostyuk (Belarus) Aliaksandra Sasnovich	2	5
2	(Hungary) Tímea Babos (France) Kristina Mladenovic	6	7

Semifinals
14	(Chile) Alexa Guarachi (United States) Desirae Krawczyk	7^{7}	1	6
(United States) Nicole Melichar (Poland) Iga Świątek	6^{5}	6	4
4	(Czech Republic) Barbora Krejčíková (Czech Republic) Kateřina Siniaková	2	6	5
2	(Hungary) Tímea Babos (France) Kristina Mladenovic	6	4	7

Final
14	(Chile) Alexa Guarachi (United States) Desirae Krawczyk	4	5
2	(Hungary) Tímea Babos (France) Kristina Mladenovic	6	7

=== Top half ===
==== Section 1 ====
First round
1	(Chinese Taipei) S-w Hsieh (Czech Republic) B Strýcová	6	6
(United States) M Sanchez (Australia) A Sharma	1	4
(Czech Republic) M Bouzková (Netherlands) A Rus	6	4	6
(Romania) A Bogdan (Sweden) R Peterson	4	6	4
(Netherlands) L Pattinama Kerkhove (Netherlands) B Schoofs	6	3	2
(United States) L Davis (United States) S Santamaria	2	6	6
(Australia) E Perez (Australia) S Sanders	3	4
14	(Chile) A Guarachi (United States) D Krawczyk	6	6
10	(United States) H Carter (Brazil) L Stefani	5	6	6
Alt	(Spain) A Bolsova (Norway) U Eikeri	7	1	3
WC	(France) T Andrianjafitrimo (France) C Paquet	3	3
(Japan) M Kato (Slovenia) T Zidanšek	6	6
(Germany) A Petkovic (Belgium) Y Wickmayer	3	1
(Sweden) C Lister (United States) S Rogers	6	6
(United States) B Pera (Czech Republic) R Voráčová	0	1
7	(Japan) S Aoyama (Japan) E Shibahara	6	6

Second round
1	(Chinese Taipei) S-w Hsieh (Czech Republic) B Strýcová	7	6
(Czech Republic) M Bouzková (Netherlands) A Rus	5	1
(United States) L Davis (United States) S Santamaria	6	3	1
14	(Chile) A Guarachi (United States) D Krawczyk	2	6	6
10	(United States) H Carter (Brazil) L Stefani	6	6
(Japan) M Kato (Slovenia) T Zidanšek	2	2
(Sweden) C Lister (United States) S Rogers	7^{9}	2	6^{4}
7	(Japan) S Aoyama (Japan) E Shibahara	6^{7}	6	7^{7}

Third round
1	(Chinese Taipei) S-w Hsieh (Czech Republic) B Strýcová	4	5
14	(Chile) A Guarachi (United States) D Krawczyk	6	7
10	(United States) H Carter (Brazil) L Stefani	4	5
7	(Japan) S Aoyama (Japan) E Shibahara	6	7

Quarterfinals
14	(Chile) A Guarachi (United States) D Krawczyk	6	6
7	(Japan) S Aoyama (Japan) E Shibahara	0	4

==== Section 2 ====
First round
3	(Belgium) E Mertens (Belarus) A Sabalenka	6	6
(Romania) I-C Begu (Romania) R Olaru	1	4
(United States) A Muhammad (United States) J Pegula	6	4	6
PR	(Belarus) V Lapko (Ukraine) D Yastremska	4	6	3
WC	(France) A Hesse (France) H Tan	0	6^{2}
(Ukraine) K Kozlova (Poland) M Linette	6	7^{7}
WC	(France) A Droguet (France) S Janicijevic	0	2
16	(United States) C Gauff (United States) C McNally	6	6
12	(Germany) L Siegemund (Russia) V Zvonareva	6	6
WC	(France) A Cornet (France) P Parmentier	4	2
(United States) N Melichar (Poland) I Świątek	6	6
(Switzerland) X Knoll (Montenegro) D Kovinić	1	3
(United States) A Riske (Australia) A Tomljanović	6	6
Alt	(Germany) V Heisen (United Kingdom) E Webley-Smith	2	3
(Japan) N Hibino (Japan) M Ninomiya	6^{5}	7	4
6	(Czech Republic) K Peschke (Netherlands) D Schuurs	7^{7}	5	6

Second round
3	(Belgium) E Mertens (Belarus) A Sabalenka	6	1	4
(United States) A Muhammad (United States) J Pegula	3	6	6
(Ukraine) K Kozlova (Poland) M Linette	0	6	2
16	(United States) C Gauff (United States) C McNally	6	3	6
12	(Germany) L Siegemund (Russia) V Zvonareva	3	0^{r}
(United States) N Melichar (Poland) I Świątek	6	0
(United States) A Riske (Australia) A Tomljanović	4	3
6	(Czech Republic) K Peschke (Netherlands) D Schuurs	6	6

Third round
(United States) A Muhammad (United States) J Pegula	7^{7}	6
16	(United States) C Gauff (United States) C McNally	6^{5}	3
(United States) N Melichar (Poland) I Świątek	6	6
6	(Czech Republic) K Peschke (Netherlands) D Schuurs	3	4

Quarterfinals
(United States) A Muhammad (United States) J Pegula	3	4
(United States) N Melichar (Poland) I Świątek	6	6

=== Bottom half ===
==== Section 3 ====
First round
8	(Russia) V Kudermetova (China) S Zhang	6	3	6
(Russia) A Blinkova (United States) C McHale	4	6	2
(Belgium) G Minnen (Belgium) A Van Uytvanck	6	6
(Spain) L Arruabarrena (United Kingdom) H Watson	3	2
(Serbia) N Stojanović (Switzerland) J Teichmann	6	6
WC	(Canada) LA Fernandez (France) D Parry	2	4
(Spain) P Badosa (Kazakhstan) E Rybakina	4	4
9	(United States) S Kenin (United States) B Mattek-Sands	6	6
13	(Slovakia) V Kužmová (Czech Republic) Kr Plíšková	6	2	6
Alt	(Romania) LI Paar (Germany) J Wachaczyk	2	6	0
(Russia) E Alexandrova (Georgia (country)) O Kalashnikova	3	6	6
WC	(France) E Jacquemot (France) E Lechemia	6	4	3
(Germany) A-L Friedsam (Slovenia) K Srebotnik	7	1	2
(United States) J Brady (United States) C Dolehide	5	6	6
WC	(France) C Burel (France) J Ponchet	0	3
4	(Czech Republic) B Krejčíková (Czech Republic) K Siniaková	6	6

Second round
8	(Russia) V Kudermetova (China) S Zhang	6	6
(Belgium) G Minnen (Belgium) A Van Uytvanck	3	3
(Serbia) N Stojanović (Switzerland) J Teichmann	5	2
9	(United States) S Kenin (United States) B Mattek-Sands	7	6
13	(Slovakia) V Kužmová (Czech Republic) Kr Plíšková	6	6
(Russia) E Alexandrova (Georgia (country)) O Kalashnikova	1	4
(United States) J Brady (United States) C Dolehide	6	3	4
4	(Czech Republic) B Krejčíková (Czech Republic) K Siniaková	2	6	6

Third round
8	(Russia) V Kudermetova (China) S Zhang	2	6	4
9	(United States) S Kenin (United States) B Mattek-Sands	6	3	6
13	(Slovakia) V Kužmová (Czech Republic) Kr Plíšková	4	2
4	(Czech Republic) B Krejčíková (Czech Republic) K Siniaková	6	6

Quarterfinals
9	(United States) S Kenin (United States) B Mattek-Sands	6	4	2
4	(Czech Republic) B Krejčíková (Czech Republic) K Siniaková	1	6	6

==== Section 4 ====
First round
5	(Canada) G Dabrowski (Latvia) J Ostapenko	7	6
(Kazakhstan) Z Diyas (Australia) Ar Rodionova	5	3
(Japan) M Doi (Romania) M Niculescu	6	6
(Romania) I Bara (Hungary) F Stollár	4	2
(Belgium) K Flipkens (Russia) A Pavlyuchenkova	6	6
(Ukraine) K Bondarenko (Canada) S Fichman	4	1
(Ukraine) M Kostyuk (Belarus) A Sasnovich	6	6
11	(Czech Republic) L Hradecká (Slovenia) A Klepač	4	1
15	(Ukraine) L Kichenok (Ukraine) N Kichenok	3	6	4
(Russia) V Gracheva (Italy) J Paolini	6	4	6
(Romania) A Mitu (Romania) PM Țig	7^{10}	6
(United States) M Brengle (Russia) Y Sizikova	6^{8}	4
Alt	(Slovakia) AK Schmiedlová (Ukraine) K Zavatska	3	2
(United States) K Christian (Mexico) G Olmos	6	6
(Russia) A Kalinskaya (Kazakhstan) Y Putintseva	0	4
2	(Hungary) T Babos (France) K Mladenovic	6	6

Second round
5	(Canada) G Dabrowski (Latvia) J Ostapenko	6	2	7
(Japan) M Doi (Romania) M Niculescu	4	6	5
(Belgium) K Flipkens (Russia) A Pavlyuchenkova	3	6	2
(Ukraine) M Kostyuk (Belarus) A Sasnovich	6	4	6
(Russia) V Gracheva (Italy) J Paolini	1	3
(Romania) A Mitu (Romania) PM Țig	6	6
(United States) K Christian (Mexico) G Olmos	6	4	2
2	(Hungary) T Babos (France) K Mladenovic	2	6	6

Third round
5	(Canada) G Dabrowski (Latvia) J Ostapenko	4	4
(Ukraine) M Kostyuk (Belarus) A Sasnovich	6	6
(Romania) A Mitu (Romania) PM Țig	2	3
2	(Hungary) T Babos (France) K Mladenovic	6	6

Quarterfinals
(Ukraine) M Kostyuk (Belarus) A Sasnovich	2	5
2	(Hungary) T Babos (France) K Mladenovic	6	7

== Other entry information ==
=== Wild cards ===
- (France) Tessah Andrianjafitrimo / (France) Chloé Paquet
- (France) Clara Burel / (France) Jessika Ponchet
- (France) Alizé Cornet / (France) Pauline Parmentier
- (France) Aubane Droguet / (France) Séléna Janicijevic
- (Canada) Leylah Annie Fernandez / (France) Diane Parry
- (France) Amandine Hesse / (France) Harmony Tan
- (France) Elsa Jacquemot / (France) Elixane Lechemia

=== Protected ranking ===
- (Belarus) Vera Lapko / (Ukraine) Dayana Yastremska

=== Withdrawals ===
- (Serbia) Aleksandra Krunić / (Belarus) Lidziya Marozava
- (Netherlands) Kiki Bertens / (Russia) Svetlana Kuznetsova
- (Russia) Daria Kasatkina / (Estonia) Anett Kontaveit
- (Romania) Sorana Cîrstea / (Spain) Sara Sorribes Tormo

=== Alternate pairs ===
- (Spain) Aliona Bolsova / (Norway) Ulrikke Eikeri
- (Romania) Laura Ioana Paar / (Germany) Julia Wachaczyk
- (Slovakia) Anna Karolína Schmiedlová / (Ukraine) Katarina Zavatska
- (Germany) Vivian Heisen / (United Kingdom) Emily Webley-Smith
