= 2020 French Open =

Tennis tournament played at Paris

- Date: 27 September – 11 October 2020
- Edition: 119
- Category: Grand Slam
- Draw: 128 singles players, 64 doubles pairs
- Prize money: €38,000,000
- Surface: Clay
- Location: Paris (XVI^{e}), France
- Venue: Roland Garros Stadium

Champions

Men's singles
- (Spain) Rafael Nadal

Women's singles
- (Poland) Iga Świątek

Men's doubles
- (Germany) Kevin Krawietz / (Germany) Andreas Mies

Women's doubles
- (Hungary) Tímea Babos / (France) Kristina Mladenovic

Wheelchair men's singles
- (United Kingdom) Alfie Hewett

Wheelchair women's singles
- (Japan) Yui Kamiji

Wheelchair quad singles
- (Australia) Dylan Alcott

Wheelchair men's doubles
- (United Kingdom) Alfie Hewett / (United Kingdom) Gordon Reid

Wheelchair women's doubles
- (Netherlands) Diede de Groot / (Netherlands) Aniek van Koot

Wheelchair quad doubles
- (Netherlands) Sam Schröder / (United States) David Wagner

Boys' singles
- (Switzerland) Dominic Stricker

Girls' singles
- (France) Elsa Jacquemot

Boys' doubles
- (Italy) Flavio Cobolli / (Switzerland) Dominic Stricker

Girls' doubles
- (Italy) Eleonora Alvisi / (Italy) Lisa Pigato
- French Open

The 2020 French Open was a major tennis tournament played on outdoor clay courts. It was held at the Stade Roland Garros in Paris, France. Originally scheduled for 24 May to 7 June, owing to the COVID-19 pandemic, it was first moved to 20 September to 4 October 2020, then later moved back a week further to 27 September to 11 October 2020. Qualifying matches, comprising singles and doubles play, began 21 September. Junior and wheelchair tournaments were also scheduled. Rafael Nadal was the twelve-time and three-time-defending champion in men's singles; Ashleigh Barty was the defending champion in women's singles but chose not to defend her title following concerns over the pandemic.

It was the 119th edition of the French Open and the last Grand Slam event of 2020. The main singles draws included 16 qualifiers for men and 12 for women out of 128 players in each draw.

It was also the only Grand Slam tournament to retain the advantage set in the final set of a match, as the Australian Open and Wimbledon recently switched to tiebreaks.

The men's singles title was won for the 13th time by Rafael Nadal, who won his 20th Grand Slam title, defeating Novak Djokovic in straight sets in the final. The women's singles title was won by Iga Świątek, who won her maiden WTA singles title, defeating Sofia Kenin in straight sets in the final. This was the first time in the Open Era that neither the men's nor women's singles champions dropped a set throughout the entire tournament. With his victory, Nadal equalled Roger Federer's all-time record of 20 Grand Slam titles. Świątek became the first player from Poland, male or female, and the first player born in the 21st century, male or female, to win a Grand Slam singles title.

== Tournament ==
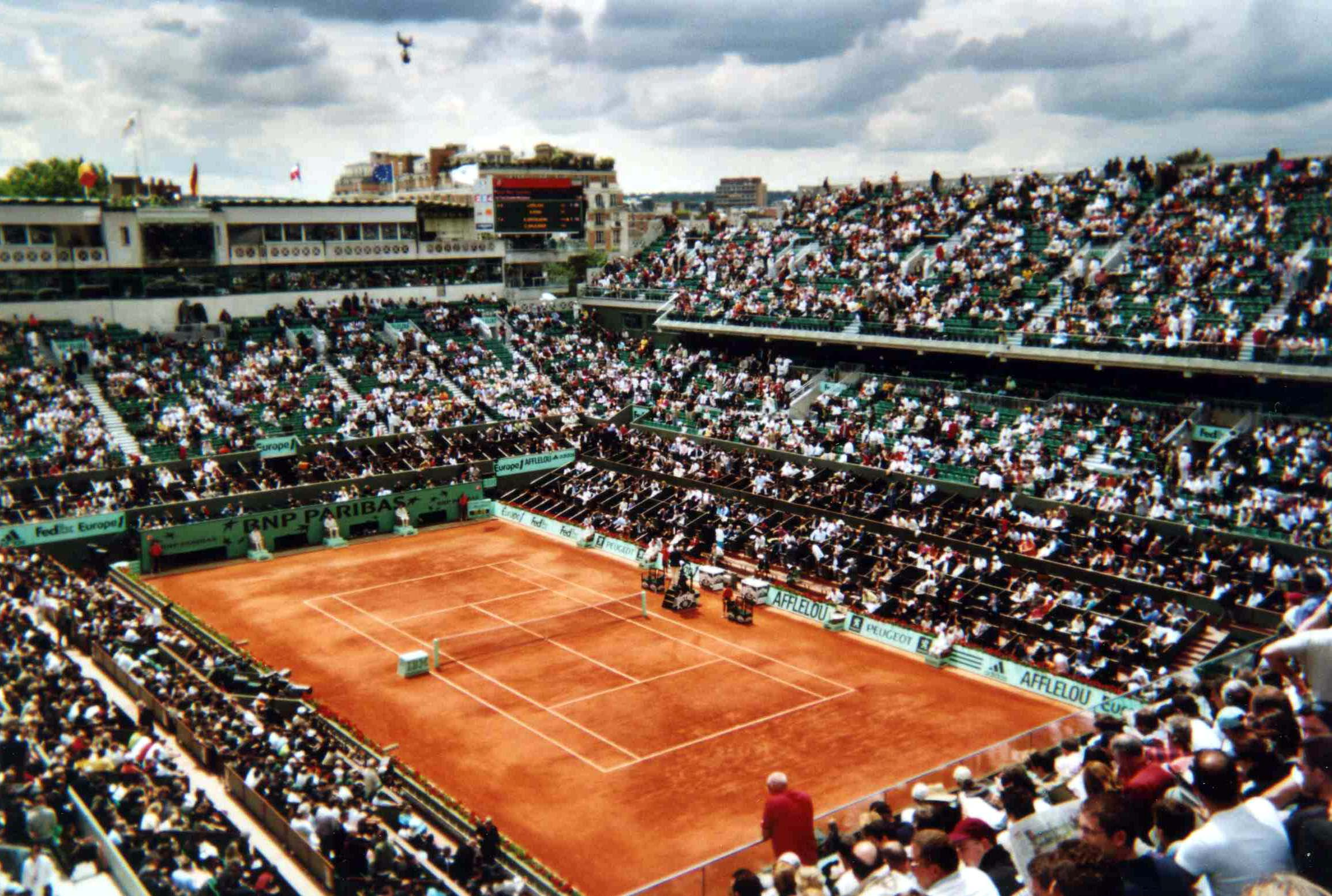
Court Philippe-Chatrier, where the finals of the French Open take place, before the 2019 renovation.

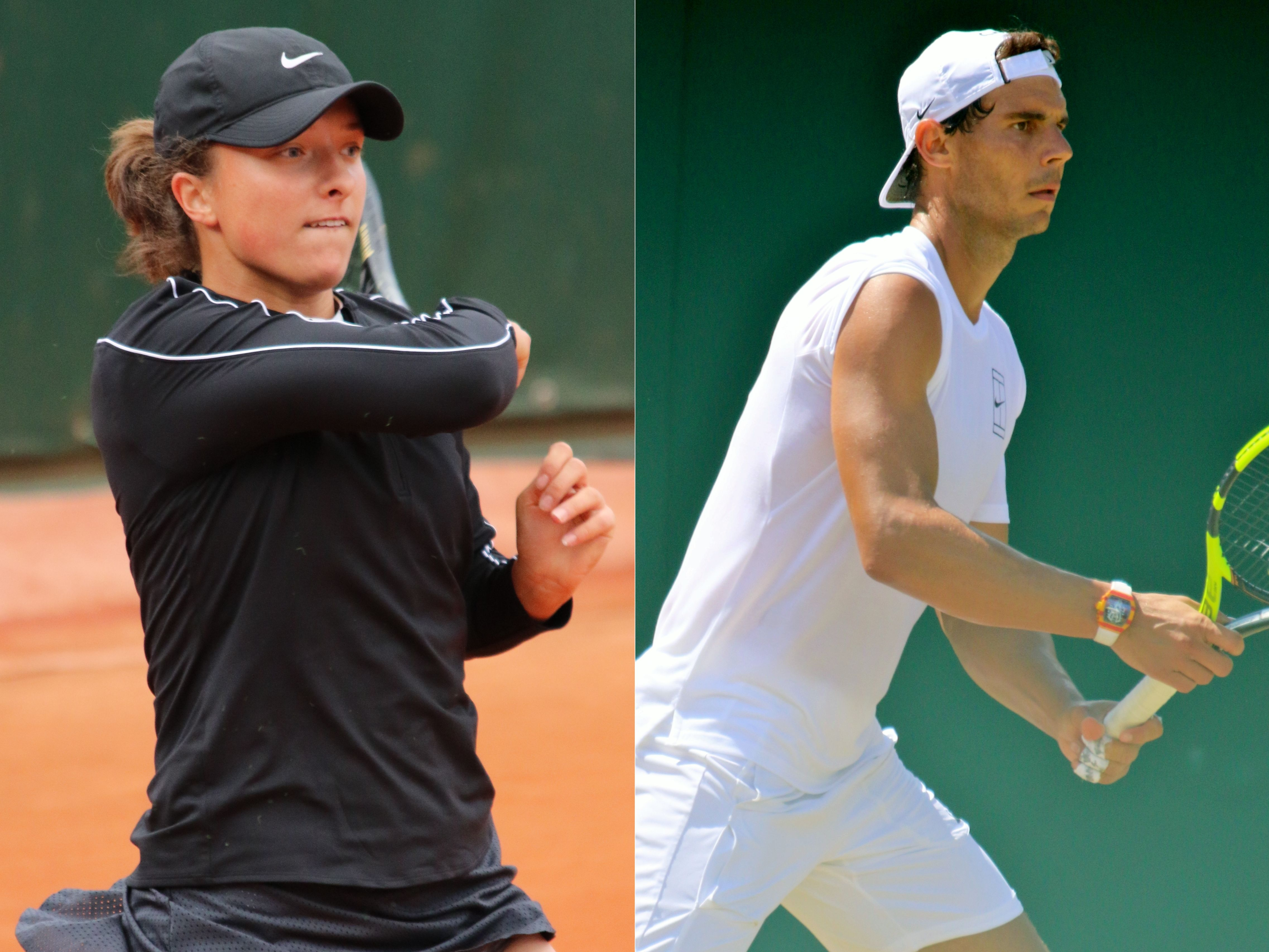
Iga Świątek and Rafael Nadal, the 2020 French Open singles champions

The 2020 French Open was the 124th edition of the French Open and was held at Stade Roland Garros in Paris. It was also the first year in which there was a retractable roof on the French tennis courts, after construction was completed on Court Philippe-Chatrier in late 2019, with plans in place to also have a roof on Court Suzanne-Lenglen by 2023. Additionally, it was also the first year in which evening tennis was possible, as floodlights were installed for the twelve courts. The sunset in Paris in September and October 2020 was at approximately before 8:00 pm CEST rather than the normal May to June schedule, which would be around after 9:30 pm CEST. Evening matches did not fully conduct until the 2021 tournament. Due to weather delays, Iga Świątek and Martina Trevisan played the first ever women's match to begin in the evening in French Open history during their quarterfinal match. A few hours later, Rafael Nadal and Jannik Sinner's quarterfinal became the first ever men's match to start in the evening in French Open history. Their match, which was played under very cold and windy conditions, started after 10:00 pm and finished at 1:26 am. This was the first ever French Open match to finish after midnight.

The tournament was run by the International Tennis Federation (ITF) and was part of the 2020 ATP Tour and the 2020 WTA Tour calendars under the Grand Slam category. The tournament consisted of both men's and women's singles and doubles draws.

There was a singles and doubles events for both boys and girls (players under 18), which was part of the Grade A category of tournaments, and singles and doubles events for men's and women's wheelchair tennis players under the Grand Slam category. The tournament was played on clay courts and took place over a series of 23 courts, including the three main showcourts, Court Philippe Chatrier, Court Suzanne Lenglen and Court Simonne Mathieu.

== Impact of the COVID-19 pandemic ==
Normally, this event is held on the fourth Sunday of May and ending in early June and is the second Grand Slam of the year on the peak of the spring clay court season. Because of the ongoing COVID-19 pandemic, on 17 March, French Tennis Federation announced the tournament had been postponed and dates were moved first to 20 September to 4 October 2020 (the dates were initially scheduled for the annual Asian Hard Court swing which would be eventually cancelled on 24 July), and then moved a week further to 27 September to 11 October 2020, just two weeks after the 2020 US Open and the cancellation of the 2020 Wimbledon Championships. For the first time since the 1947 French Championships, this event was not held on the traditional May–June schedule and it was the first time since the introduction of the Open Era that a major tournament was postponed rather than cancelled. On 13 April 2020, the French Government extended a ban on mass gatherings until July 2020 in a bid to control the spread of the virus.

The Laver Cup was scheduled from 24 to 27 September, conflicting with the initial new date for the French Open (20 September to 4 October), before being postponed to 2021.

On 7 September, it was announced the three main courts would have a maximum capacity of 11,500 spectators during the 15-day tournament, with 5,000 each in Court Philippe Chatrier and Court Suzanne Lenglen, and 1,500 in Court Simonne Mathieu. Matches on other courts would take place without spectators including the qualifying events. These guidelines followed from official health and safety protocols including social distancing regulations from the regional government. According to the tournament director Guy Forget, players and personnel would have to be tested for the virus upon arrival in Paris to confirm a negative test result and a second test 72 hours later. Players would then have to stay at two hotels stipulated by organizers once they get tested. On 17 September, the spectator capacity for each match was reduced to 5,000 in all of the three main courts owing to an ongoing surge in the number of coronavirus cases in France, and couple of days later, the capacity was reduced once again to 1,000 starting on the eve of the main tournament.

The mixed doubles event did not take place this year and this was the second consecutive Grand Slam not holding the event after the US Open.

== Singles players ==
Men's singles

Men's singles players
Champion		Runner-up	
(Spain) Rafael Nadal [2]		(Serbia) Novak Djokovic [1]	
Semifinals out
(Greece) Stefanos Tsitsipas [5]		(Argentina) Diego Schwartzman [12]	
Quarterfinals out
(Spain) Pablo Carreño Busta [17]	(Russia) Andrey Rublev [13]	(Austria) Dominic Thiem [3]	(Italy) Jannik Sinner
4th round out
(Russia) Karen Khachanov [15]	(Germany) Daniel Altmaier [Q]	(Hungary) Márton Fucsovics	(Bulgaria) Grigor Dimitrov [18]
(Italy) Lorenzo Sonego	(France) Hugo Gaston (WC)	(Germany) Alexander Zverev [6]	(United States) Sebastian Korda (Q)
3rd round out
(Colombia) Daniel Elahi Galán [LL]	(Chile) Cristian Garín [20]	(Spain) Roberto Bautista Agut [10]	(Italy) Matteo Berrettini [7]
(Brazil) Thiago Monteiro	(South Africa) Kevin Anderson (PR)	(Spain) Roberto Carballés Baena	(Slovenia) Aljaž Bedene
(United States) Taylor Fritz [27]	(Slovakia) Norbert Gombos	(Switzerland) Stan Wawrinka [16]	(Norway) Casper Ruud [28]
(Italy) Marco Cecchinato (Q)	(Argentina) Federico Coria	(Spain) Pedro Martínez (Q)	(Italy) Stefano Travaglia
2nd round out
(Lithuania) Ričardas Berankis	(United States) Tennys Sandgren	(Australia) Marc Polmans (LL)	(Czech Republic) Jiří Veselý
(Hungary) Attila Balázs	(Argentina) Guido Pella	(Germany) Jan-Lennard Struff [30]	(South Africa) Lloyd Harris
(Spain) Albert Ramos Viñolas	(United States) Marcos Giron	(Serbia) Dušan Lajović [22]	(Spain) Alejandro Davidovich Fokina
(Canada) Denis Shapovalov [9]	(Slovakia) Andrej Martin	(Serbia) Nikola Milojević (Q)	(Uruguay) Pablo Cuevas
(Kazakhstan) Alexander Bublik	(Moldova) Radu Albot	(Austria) Jurij Rodionov (Q)	(Italy) Lorenzo Giustino (Q)
(Germany) Dominik Koepfer	(Japan) Yoshihito Nishioka	(United States) Tommy Paul	(United States) Jack Sock (Q)
(France) Pierre-Hugues Herbert	(Argentina) Juan Ignacio Londero	(France) Benoît Paire [23]	(France) Benjamin Bonzi (Q)
(Kazakhstan) Mikhail Kukushkin	(United States) John Isner [21]	(Japan) Kei Nishikori	(United States) Mackenzie McDonald (PR)
1st round out
(Sweden) Mikael Ymer	(Bolivia) Hugo Dellien	(United Kingdom) Cameron Norrie	(Poland) Hubert Hurkacz [29]
(Germany) Philipp Kohlschreiber	(France) Ugo Humbert	(United Kingdom) Liam Broady (Q)	(Poland) Kamil Majchrzak (PR)
(France) Richard Gasquet	(Japan) Yasutaka Uchiyama	(Italy) Salvatore Caruso	(Australia) John Millman
(United States) Frances Tiafoe	(Spain) Feliciano López	(Australia) Alexei Popyrin	(Canada) Vasek Pospisil
(Russia) Daniil Medvedev [4]	(France) Adrian Mannarino	(France) Quentin Halys (WC)	(Georgia (country)) Nikoloz Basilashvili [31]
(Italy) Gianluca Mager	(Serbia) Laslo Đere	(France) Harold Mayot (WC)	(United States) Sam Querrey
(France) Gilles Simon	(United States) Steve Johnson	(Portugal) João Sousa	(France) Grégoire Barrère
(Serbia) Filip Krajinović [26]	(France) Arthur Rinderknech (WC)	(Switzerland) Henri Laaksonen (Q)	(Spain) Jaume Munar
(France) Gaël Monfils [8]	(Ecuador) Emilio Gómez (Q)	(Australia) Jordan Thompson	(Czech Republic) Tomáš Macháč (Q)
(Croatia) Borna Ćorić [24]	(France) Jérémy Chardy	(France) Corentin Moutet	(Serbia) Miomir Kecmanović
(United Kingdom) Andy Murray (WC)	(France) Antoine Hoang (WC)	(France) Maxime Janvier (WC)	(Canada) Félix Auger-Aliassime [19]
(Japan) Yūichi Sugita	(Australia) James Duckworth	(United States) Reilly Opelka	(Croatia) Marin Čilić
(Austria) Dennis Novak	(United States) Michael Mmoh (Q)	(Argentina) Federico Delbonis	(Australia) Alex de Minaur [25]
(South Korea) Kwon Soon-woo	(Chinese Taipei) Jason Jung (LL)	(Finland) Emil Ruusuvuori	(Belgium) David Goffin [11]
(Italy) Fabio Fognini [14]	(Australia) Aleksandar Vukic (Q)	(Italy) Andreas Seppi	(France) Elliot Benchetrit (WC)
(United Kingdom) Dan Evans [32]	(Spain) Pablo Andújar	(Canada) Steven Diez (Q)	(Belarus) Egor Gerasimov

Women's singles

Women's singles players
Champion		Runner-up	
(Poland) Iga Świątek		(United States) Sofia Kenin [4]	
Semifinals out
(Argentina) Nadia Podoroska (Q)		(Czech Republic) Petra Kvitová [7]	
Quarterfinals out
(Italy) Martina Trevisan [Q]	(Ukraine) Elina Svitolina [3]	(United States) Danielle Collins	(Germany) Laura Siegemund
4th round out
(Romania) Simona Halep [1]	(Netherlands) Kiki Bertens [5]	(France) Caroline Garcia	(Czech Republic) Barbora Krejčíková
(Tunisia) Ons Jabeur [30]	(France) Fiona Ferro	(China) Zhang Shuai	(Spain) Paula Badosa
3rd round out
(United States) Amanda Anisimova [25]	(Canada) Eugenie Bouchard (WC)	(Greece) Maria Sakkari [20]	(Czech Republic) Kateřina Siniaková
(Russia) Ekaterina Alexandrova [27]	(Belgium) Elise Mertens [16]	(Slovakia) Anna Karolína Schmiedlová (PR)	(Bulgaria) Tsvetana Pironkova (WC)
(Belarus) Aryna Sabalenka [8]	(Spain) Garbiñe Muguruza [11]	(Romania) Patricia Maria Țig	(Romania) Irina Bara (Q)
(Canada) Leylah Annie Fernandez	(France) Clara Burel (WC)	(Croatia) Petra Martić [13]	(Latvia) Jeļena Ostapenko
2nd round out
(Romania) Irina-Camelia Begu	(United States) Bernarda Pera	(Australia) Daria Gavrilova (PR)	(Chinese Taipei) Hsieh Su-wei
(United States) Coco Gauff	(Russia) Kamilla Rakhimova (Q)	(Russia) Anastasia Pavlyuchenkova	(Italy) Sara Errani (Q)
(Mexico) Renata Zarazúa (Q)	(Australia) Astra Sharma (LL)	(Belarus) Aliaksandra Sasnovich	(Estonia) Kaia Kanepi
(Belarus) Victoria Azarenka [10]	(Kazakhstan) Yulia Putintseva [23]	(Czech Republic) Barbora Strýcová [32]	(United States) Serena Williams [6]
(Russia) Daria Kasatkina	(Japan) Nao Hibino	(Denmark) Clara Tauson (Q)	(Czech Republic) Kristýna Plíšková
(Kazakhstan) Elena Rybakina [14]	(United States) Christina McHale	(Belgium) Alison Van Uytvanck	(Romania) Ana Bogdan
(Italy) Jasmine Paolini	(Slovenia) Polona Hercog	(Slovenia) Kaja Juvan	(France) Alizé Cornet
(Russia) Veronika Kudermetova	(Germany) Julia Görges	(United States) Sloane Stephens [29]	(Czech Republic) Karolína Plíšková [2]
1st round out
(Spain) Sara Sorribes Tormo	(Switzerland) Jil Teichmann	(United States) Catherine Bellis (PR)	(Germany) Tamara Korpatsch
(Ukraine) Dayana Yastremska [24]	(Russia) Anna Kalinskaya	(Austria) Barbara Haas (Q)	(Czech Republic) Markéta Vondroušová [15]
(United Kingdom) Johanna Konta [9]	(Italy) Camila Giorgi	(United States) Shelby Rogers	(Australia) Ajla Tomljanović
(Russia) Svetlana Kuznetsova [28]	(United States) Lauren Davis	(Puerto Rico) Monica Puig	(Ukraine) Katarina Zavatska
(Russia) Varvara Gracheva	(France) Elsa Jacquemot (WC)	(Russia) Anna Blinkova	(Australia) Maddison Inglis
(Estonia) Anett Kontaveit [17]	(Germany) Anna-Lena Friedsam	(Czech Republic) Marie Bouzková	(Russia) Margarita Gasparyan
(Montenegro) Danka Kovinić	(United States) Venus Williams	(Belgium) Greet Minnen	(Belgium) Kirsten Flipkens
(United States) Varvara Lepchenko (Q)	(Serbia) Nina Stojanović	(Germany) Andrea Petkovic	(United States) Kristie Ahn
(United States) Jessica Pegula	(France) Harmony Tan (WC)	(Ukraine) Marta Kostyuk (Q)	(Kazakhstan) Zarina Diyas
(United States) Jennifer Brady [21]	(Romania) Monica Niculescu (Q)	(Slovakia) Viktória Kužmová	(Slovenia) Tamara Zidanšek
(Romania) Sorana Cîrstea	(United Kingdom) Heather Watson	(Switzerland) Stefanie Vögele	(Czech Republic) Karolína Muchová [22]
(Croatia) Donna Vekić [26]	(Sweden) Rebecca Peterson	(Hungary) Tímea Babos	(Russia) Liudmila Samsonova
(France) Océane Dodin	(Spain) Aliona Bolsova	(France) Diane Parry (WC)	(Poland) Magda Linette [31]
(Germany) Angelique Kerber [18]	(Netherlands) Arantxa Rus	(France) Chloé Paquet (WC)	(United States) Madison Keys [12]
(Japan) Misaki Doi	(France) Pauline Parmentier (WC)	(France) Kristina Mladenovic	(United States) Alison Riske [19]
(Russia) Vitalia Diatchenko	(Ukraine) Kateryna Kozlova	(United States) Madison Brengle	(Egypt) Mayar Sherif (Q)

== Events ==
=== Men's singles ===
- (Spain) Rafael Nadal def. (Serbia) Novak Djokovic, 6–0, 6–2, 7–5

The men's singles event began on 27 September with the first of seven total rounds. 32 players were seeded, while the other 96 players were not. Of those seeded players, eleven were defeated in the first round, notably No. 4 Daniil Medvedev, No. 8 Gaël Monfils, and No. 11 David Goffin. As the French Open was then the only remaining Grand Slam tournament that used the advantage set, there existed the possibility of significantly longer final sets, as seen in the first round match between Lorenzo Giustino and Corentin Moutet. The match was won after just over six hours by the former, 0–6, 7–6 (7), 7–6 (3), 2–6, 18–16, and was the second-longest match in French Open history. Denis Shapovalov, John Isner, and Dušan Lajović were the highest of the five seeded players to exit in the second round, and a further nine seeded players were defeated in the third and fourth rounds. Of the eight players that qualified for the finals, seven were seeded, with Jannik Sinner (who lost only one set in the first four rounds combined) the lone exception.

In the quarterfinals, No. 1 Novak Djokovic defeated No. 17 Pablo Carreño Busta (Djokovic's loss in the first set was his first dropped set of the tournament), No. 5 Stefanos Tsitsipas defeated No. 13 Andrey Rublev, No. 12 Diego Schwartzman upset No. 3 Dominic Thiem, and No. 2 Rafael Nadal ended the upset bid of Jannik Sinner. The two semifinal matches told very different tales; Nadal dominated Schwartzman, beating him in straight sets, while Djokovic opened against Tsitsipas by winning the first two sets, but dropped the next two before winning the final set 6–1 to take the match. In the championship, Nadal opened dominantly with a first-set bagel and a 6–2 performance in the second set, and finished with a 7–5 final set to win the title. This marked Nadal's fourth consecutive and 13th overall French Open title and his 20th overall Grand Slam singles title, equaling Roger Federer's all-time record. Furthermore, Nadal did not lose a single set throughout the entire tournament.

=== Women's singles ===
- (Poland) Iga Świątek def. (United States) Sofia Kenin, 6–4, 6–1

The women's singles event began on 27 September with the first of seven total rounds. 32 players were seeded, while the other 96 players were not. Twelve seeded players lost in the first round, notably No. 9 Johanna Konta, No. 12 Madison Keys, and No. 15 Markéta Vondroušová, and a further seven fell in the second round, among them No. 2 Karolína Plíšková, No. 10 Victoria Azarenka, and No. 14 Elena Rybakina. Sixth-seeded Serena Williams withdrew prior to her second round match (awarded on walkover to Tsvetana Pironkova) because of an achilles injury. Ten seeded players lost in the third and fourth round combined, including top seed Simona Halep.

Only three seeded players qualified for the finals. In the quarterfinals, three matches were decided in straight sets: No. 3 Elina Svitolina was upset by Nadia Podoroska, Iga Świątek defeated Martina Trevisan, and No. 7 Petra Kvitová beat Laura Siegemund. No. 4 Sofia Kenin's defeat of Danielle Collins was the only to go to a third set. In the semifinals, Świątek defeated Podoroska and Kenin beat Kvitová, both in straight sets. This set up a final between Świątek and Kenin, which was won easily by Świątek, 6–4, 6–1. This was Świątek's first WTA singles title, as she became first Polish player, male or female, to win a Grand Slam singles title. Świątek did not drop a set throughout the entire tournament, did not lose more than 4 games per set, and did not lose more than 5 games in any match.

=== Men's doubles ===
- (Germany) Kevin Krawietz / (Germany) Andreas Mies def. (Croatia) Mate Pavić / (Brazil) Bruno Soares, 6–3, 7–5

The men's doubles event began on 29 September with the first of six total rounds. 16 pairs were seeded, while the other 48 players were not. In the first round, only one seeded pair lost: tenth-seeded Raven Klaasen and Oliver Marach. In addition, 12th-seeded Jean-Julien Rojer and Horia Tecău advanced after playing just one set after Cristian Garín and Pedro Martínez retired. The second round saw the elimination of just three more seeded pairs, No. 4 Łukasz Kubot/Marcelo Melo, No. 11 John Peers/Michael Venus, and No. 16 Austin Krajicek/Franko Škugor. However, in the third round, six of the remaining twelve seeded pairs lost, notably second-seed Marcel Granollers and Horacio Zeballos, fifth-seed Ivan Dodig and Filip Polášek, and sixth-seed Pierre-Hugues Herbert and Nicolas Mahut.

In the quarterfinals, the top-seeded pair of Juan Sebastián Cabal and Robert Farah dropped their opening set for the third time in four matches before coming back to win in three over Frederik Nielsen and Tim Pütz. No. 7 Mate Pavić and Bruno Soares dropped their first set as well before winning the final two to defeat Rajeev Ram and Joe Salisbury, the No. 3 pair. The other two quarterfinal matches were decided in straight sets: No. 9 Wesley Koolhof and Nikola Mektić defeated Nicholas Monroe and Tommy Paul, and No. 8 Kevin Krawietz and Andreas Mies defeated No. 13 Jamie Murray and Neal Skupski. In the semifinals, Pavić and Soares pulled off a straight-set upset of the top seeded pair, while Krawietz and Mies defeated Koolhof and Mektić in two sets as well. This set up a final between Pavić/Soares and Krawietz/Mies, which was won by the latter pair in straight sets. This marked the second Grand Slam title for both players, as they had won the French Open doubles championship the year prior for their first title.

=== Women's doubles ===
- (Hungary) Tímea Babos / (France) Kristina Mladenovic def. (Chile) Alexa Guarachi / (United States) Desirae Krawczyk, 6–4, 7–5

The women's doubles event began on 30 September with the first of six total rounds. 16 pairs were seeded, while the other 48 players were not. The first round saw the loss of two seeded pairs: No. 11 Lucie Hradecká and Andreja Klepač and twin sisters Lyudmyla and Nadiia Kichenok, the No. 15 seeded pair. Two further pairs fell in the second round; No. 3 Elise Mertens and Aryna Sabalenka were defeated and No. 12 Laura Siegemund and Vera Zvonareva retired after the first set of their match. Of the fourteen remaining seeded pairs, half of them were defeated in the third round. Notably among these were the top-seeded pair, Hsieh Su-wei and Barbora Strýcová, as well as No. 5 Gabriela Dabrowski and Jeļena Ostapenko, No. 6 Květa Peschke and Demi Schuurs.

Five seeded pairs qualified for the quarterfinals, alongside three unseeded pairs. In the quarterfinals, No. 14 Alexa Guarachi/Desirae Krawczyk upset No. 7 Shuko Aoyama/Ena Shibahara, Iga Świątek/Nicole Melichar defeated Asia Muhammad/Jessica Pegula, No. 4 Barbora Krejčíková/Kateřina Siniaková beat No. 9 Sofia Kenin/Bethanie Mattek-Sands, and No. 2 Tímea Babos/Kristina Mladenovic (the defending champions) defeated Marta Kostyuk/Aliaksandra Sasnovich. The semifinals saw the elimination of the final unranked pair, Świątek and Melichar, at the hands of Guarachi and Krawczyk, while Babos and Mladenovic defeated Krejčíková and Siniaková. This set up a final between the pair of Babos and Mladenovic and the pair of Guarachi and Krawczyk. The former pair successfully defended their title in straight sets by a score of 6–4, 7–5.

=== Wheelchair men's singles ===
- (United Kingdom) Alfie Hewett def. (Belgium) Joachim Gérard, 6–4, 4–6, 6–3

The wheelchair men's singles tournament began on 7 October with the quarterfinal round. The field was composed of eight players; Shingo Kunieda and defending champion Gustavo Fernández received the top two seeds and the other six players were unseeded. All of the quarterfinal matches were decided in straight sets, as Kunieda defeated wild card entry Frédéric Cattanéo, Joachim Gérard defeated Nicolas Peifer, Alfie Hewett defeated Stéphane Houdet, and Fernández defeated Gordon Reid. Both semifinal matches saw a ranked player upset; No. 1 Kunieda was defeated in three sets by Gérard and No. 2 Fernández fell in two sets to Hewett. In the final, Hewett won the first set 6–4 before losing the second set to Gérard by the same score. Hewett prevailed 6–3 in the final set to win the championship, his fourth Grand Slam singles title in his sixth appearance.

=== Wheelchair women's singles ===
- (Japan) Yui Kamiji def. (Japan) Momoko Ohtani, 6–2, 6–1

The wheelchair women's singles tournament began on 7 October with the quarterfinal round. The field was composed of eight players; Diede de Groot and Yui Kamiji received the top two seeds and the other six players were unseeded. All but one of the quarterfinal matches went to three sets, as de Groot defeated Jordanne Whiley, Aniek van Koot defeated wild card entry Charlotte Famin, and Kamiji defeated Marjolein Buis. Momoko Ohtani was the only player to win in straight sets, defeating Kgothatso Montjane. This set up two semifinal matches, each to be played between a player from The Netherlands and a player from Japan. In each match, the Japanese player prevailed; Ohtani defeated top-seeded de Groot and Kamiji beat Van Koot, both in straight sets. The final was played on 9 October between the lone Japanese players in the event. In the final, No. 2 Yui Kamiji defeated Momoko Ohtani, 6–2, 6–1, to win her fourth French Open singles title and her 24th Grand Slam title overall.

=== Wheelchair quad singles ===
- (Australia) Dylan Alcott def. (United Kingdom) Andy Lapthorne, 6–2, 6–2

The wheelchair quad singles tournament began on 8 October with the semifinal round. The field was composed of four players; defending champion Dylan Alcott and Andy Lapthorne received the top two seeds and the other two players were unseeded. In the opening round, Alcott faced wild card entry Sam Schröder in a rematch of the final of the US Open some weeks earlier. Alcott was victorious in two sets. The other semifinal saw Lapthorne defeat David Wagner in three sets, with Lapthorne winning the first and third. The third place match took place between Schröder and Wagner, and was won by the former in straight sets. The final was played between No. 1 Alcott and No. 2 Lapthorne, with Alcott winning both sets by a score of 6–2 to capture his eleventh Grand Slam singles title.

=== Wheelchair men's doubles ===
- (United Kingdom) Alfie Hewett / (United Kingdom) Gordon Reid def. (Argentina) Gustavo Fernández / (Japan) Shingo Kunieda, 7–6^{(7–4)}, 1–6, [10–3]

The wheelchair men's doubles competition featured the same eight players as contested the singles event. Houdet and Peifer teamed up to form the top-seeded pair, while Hewett and Reid were the second seeds. The other pairings were Fernandez with Kunieda, and Cattanéo with Gerard. Houdet and Peifer were beaten 12–10 on a tie-break in their semi-final by Fernandez and Kunieda, after the two sides had won a set each, while Hewett and Reid advanced to the final with a straight-sets victory over Cattanéo and Gerard. In the final, Hewett and Reid won the first set on a tie-break before losing the second 6–1, but finished victorious after the deciding tie-break finished 10–3 in their favour.

=== Wheelchair women's doubles ===
- (Netherlands) Diede de Groot / (Netherlands) Aniek van Koot def. (Japan) Yui Kamiji / (United Kingdom) Jordanne Whiley, 7–6^{(7–2)}, 3–6, [10–8]

As with the men's competition, the wheelchair women's doubles event featured the same eight players as in the singles event. Two of the four pairs were seeded: Diede de Groot and Aniek van Koot received the top seed, and the second seed went to Yui Kamiji and Jordanne Whiley. In the semifinals, De Groot and van Koot defeated the pair of Kgothatso Montjane and Momoko Ohtani, and Kamiji and Whiley defeated the pair of Marjolein Buis and Charlotte Famin. The final was played between the pair of de Groot and van Koot, the defending champions, and the pair of Kamiji and Whiley. The Dutch pair took the first set 7–6 in a tiebreak, but the latter pair came back to win the second set 6–3 and force the match into a third. The third set, consisting of solely a tiebreak, was won 10–8 by de Groot and van Koot, completing their successful title defense.

=== Wheelchair quad doubles ===
- (Netherlands) Sam Schröder / (United States) David Wagner def. (Australia) Dylan Alcott / (United Kingdom) Andy Lapthorne, 4–6, 7–5, [10–8]

The wheelchair quad doubles event consisted of a single match, played on 9 October between the pair of Dylan Alcott and Andy Lapthorne and the pair of David Wagner and Sam Schröder. Alcott and Wagner won this event as partners at the tournament the year prior, but chose to partner with different players for this edition. The first set was won by Alcott and Lapthorne, 6–4, but Schröder and Wagner responded with a 7–5 win in the second set. The third set consisted only of a tiebreak, which was won by Schröder and Wagner, 10–8, to capture their second and nineteenth overall Grand Slam titles, respectively.

=== Boys' singles ===
- (Switzerland) Dominic Stricker def. (Switzerland) Leandro Riedi, 6–2, 6–4

Of the sixteen seeded players, only two made it through the first three rounds and into the quarterfinals: No. 7 Dominic Stricker and No. 8 Leandro Riedi. Stricker defeated Lukas Neumayer in his quarterfinal matchup, while Riede battled from behind to defeat Alex Barrena. The other two matches saw Juan Bautista Torres defeat Lilian Marmousez and Guy den Ouden defeat Sean Cuenin. In the semifinals, Stricker beat Torres in three sets (with both of his wins coming by virtue of bagels), while Riedi booked a place in the final by defeating den Ouden in two sets. The all-Swiss championship match was won by Stricker, as he defeated Riede 6–2, 6–4, to claim his first junior Grand Slam title.

=== Girls' singles ===
- (France) Elsa Jacquemot def. (Russia) Alina Charaeva, 4–6, 6–4, 6–2

Of the sixteen seeded players, five made it past the first three rounds and qualified for the quarterfinals. Among them was No. 3 Elsa Jacquemot, who was awarded a wild card into the main competition, but lost to qualifier Renata Zarazúa in the first round; she then entered the Girls' Singles competition. Jaacquemot defeated No. 10 Kristina Dmitruk in straight sets in her quarterfinal match; the other matches saw Alina Charaeva upset No. 9 Alexandra Vecic, No. 4 Polina Kudermetova defeat Océane Babel, and No. 2 Alexandra Eala defeat Linda Nosková. In the semifinals, Charaeva pulled another upset by defeating Kudermetova, while Jacquemot defeated Eala. The final was played between Jacquemot and Charaeva, and was won by the former, 4–6, 6–4, 6–2.

=== Boys' doubles ===
- (Italy) Flavio Cobolli / (Switzerland) Dominic Stricker def. (Brazil) Bruno Oliveira / (Brazil) Natan Rodrigues, 6–2, 6–4

Of the four pairs that qualified for the semifinals, two were seeded. Only three seeded pairs of the original eight made it past the second round, notably No. 1 Arthur Cazaux and Harold Mayot, who withdrew before their opening match. The only seeded pair to lose their quarterfinal match was No. 7 Mikołaj Lorens and Kārlis Ozoliņš, who retired before the second set began. The No. 8 pair of Bruno Oliveira and Natan Rodrigues qualified for the semifinals, defeating Martin Krumich and Dalibor Svrčina in two sets to book a place in the final. The No. 3 pair of Flavio Cobolli and Dominic Stricker defeated Lilian Marmousez and Giovanni Mpetshi Perricard in a third-set tiebreak to win their semifinal match and advance to the final. In the championship match, Cobolli and Stricker defeated Oliveira and Rodrigues, 6–2, 6–4, to win the title.

=== Girls' doubles ===
- (Italy) Eleonora Alvisi / (Italy) Lisa Pigato def. (Russia) Maria Bondarenko / (Russia) Diana Shnaider, 7–6^{(7–3)}, 6–4

Of the eight pairs that were seeded at the start of the tournament, two were among the four pairs that qualified for the semifinal round. Notably, the top-seeded pair of Weronika Baszak and Elsa Jacquemot were defeated in straight sets in the first round, while No. 3 Alexandra Eala and Elvina Kalieva were knocked out in the third-set tiebreak of their opening match. The semifinals saw the fifth-seeded pair of Maria Bondarenko and Diana Shnaider come from behind to defeat Jéssica Bouzas Maneiro and Guillermina Grant, and No. 2 Kamilla Bartone and Oksana Selekhmeteva lose in an upset to Eleonora Alvisi and Lisa Pigato. This set up a final between No. 5 Bondarenko/Shnaider and unseeded Alvisi/Pigato, which was won in an upset by the latter in straight sets, 7–6^{(7–3)}, 6–4.

== Point distribution and prize money ==
=== Point distribution ===
Below is a series of tables for each of the competitions showing the ranking points on offer for each event.

==== Senior points ====
Event	W	F	SF	QF	Round of 16	Round of 32	Round of 64	Round of 128	Q	Q3	Q2	Q1
Men's singles	2000	1200	720	360	180	90	45	10	25	16	8	0
Men's doubles	2000	1200	720	360	180	90	0	—N/a	—N/a	—N/a	—N/a	—N/a
Women's singles	2000	1300	780	430	240	130	70	10	40	30	20	2
Women's doubles	2000	1300	780	430	240	130	10	—N/a	—N/a	—N/a	—N/a	—N/a

==== Wheelchair points ====
Event	W	F	SF/3rd	QF/4th
Singles	800	500	375	100
Doubles	800	500	100	—N/a
Quad singles	800	500	100	—N/a
Quad doubles	800	100	—N/a	—N/a

==== Junior points ====
Event	W	F	SF	QF	Round of 16	Round of 32	Q	Q3
Boys' singles	1000	600	370	200	100	45	30	20
Girls' singles	1000	600	370	200	100	45	30	20
Boys' doubles	750	450	275	150	75	—N/a	—N/a	—N/a
Girls' doubles	750	450	275	150	75	—N/a	—N/a	—N/a

=== Prize money ===
Event	W	F	SF	QF	Round of 16	Round of 32	Round of 64	Round of 128	Q3	Q2	Q1
Singles	€1,600,000	€800,000	€425,250	€283,500	€189,000	€126,000	€84,000	€60,000	€25,600	€16,000	€10,000
Doubles *	€319,652	€188,030	€110,606	€65,062	€38,272	€23,920	€14,950	—N/a	—N/a	—N/a	—N/a
Wheelchair singles	€	€	€	€	—N/a	—N/a	—N/a	—N/a	—N/a	—N/a	—N/a
Wheelchair doubles *	€	€	€	—N/a	—N/a	—N/a	—N/a	—N/a	—N/a	—N/a	—N/a

_{* per team}

Preceded by 2019 French Open	French Open	Succeeded by 2021 French Open
Preceded by 2020 US Open	Grand Slam events	Succeeded by 2021 Australian Open
