= 2020 French Open – Girls' singles =

Girls' singles
- 2020 French Open

Final
- Champion: (France) Elsa Jacquemot
- Runner-up: (Russia) Alina Charaeva
- Score: 4–6, 6–4, 6–2

Events
Singles	men	women		boys	girls
Doubles	men	women	mixed	boys	girls
WC Singles	men	women	quad
WC Doubles	men	women	quad
Legends	−45	45+	women
← 2019 ·	French Open	· 2021 →

Elsa Jacquemot received a wildcard into the women's singles competition, but lost to qualifier Renata Zarazúa in the first round. Jacquemot then entered the girls' singles competition and won the title, defeating Alina Charaeva in the final, 4–6, 6–4, 6–2.

Leylah Annie Fernandez was the defending champion, but chose to compete in the women's singles competition. She lost to seventh seed Petra Kvitová in the third round.

== Seeds ==
1. (Andorra) Victoria Jiménez Kasintseva (second round)
2. (Philippines) Alex Eala (semifinals)
3. (France) Elsa Jacquemot (champion)
4. (Russia) Polina Kudermetova (semifinals)
5. (Poland) Weronika Baszak (first round)
6. (Latvia) Kamilla Bartone (second round)
7. (Russia) Maria Bondarenko (first round)
8. (Russia) Oksana Selekhmeteva (third round)

9. (Germany) Alexandra Vecic (quarterfinals)
10. (Belarus) Kristina Dmitruk (quarterfinals)
11. (Czech Republic) Linda Fruhvirtová (second round)
12. (United States) Alexandra Yepifanova (first round)
13. (United States) Elvina Kalieva (first round)
14. (Belarus) Aliona Falei (first round)
15. (United Kingdom) Matilda Mutavdzic (third round)
16. (Belarus) Jana Kolodynska (first round)

Click on the seed number of a player to go to their draw section.

== Draw ==
=== Key ===
- Q = Qualifier
- WC = Wild card
- LL = Lucky loser
- Alt = Alternate
- ITF = ITF entry
- PR = Protected ranking
- SR = Special ranking
- SE = Special exempt
- JE = Junior exempt
- JR = Junior Accelerator Programme entrant
- CO = College Accelerator Programme entrant
- NG = Next Gen Accelerator Program entrant
- w/o = Walkover
- r = Retired
- d = Defaulted

=== Finals ===
Quarterfinals
(Russia) Alina Charaeva	6	6
9	(Germany) Alexandra Vecic	2	3
4	(Russia) Polina Kudermetova	6	7
(France) Océane Babel	3	5
10	(Belarus) Kristina Dmitruk	4	4
3	(France) Elsa Jacquemot	6	6
(Czech Republic) Linda Nosková	6	3	2
2	(Philippines) Alex Eala	4	6	6

Semifinals
(Russia) Alina Charaeva	6^{5}	6	7
4	(Russia) Polina Kudermetova	7^{7}	2	5
3	(France) Elsa Jacquemot	6	6
2	(Philippines) Alex Eala	3	2

Final
(Russia) Alina Charaeva	6	4	2
3	(France) Elsa Jacquemot	4	6	6

=== Top half ===
==== Section 1 ====
First round
1	(Andorra) Victoria Jiménez Kasintseva	6	6
WC	(France) Shanice Roignot	2	4
(Switzerland) Sebastianna Scilipoti	1	0
(Russia) Alina Charaeva	6	6
(Italy) Matilde Paoletti	2	6	7
(France) Célia-Belle Mohr	6	2	5
(Russia) Alina Shcherbinina	6	6
14	(Belarus) Aliona Falei	1	2
9	(Germany) Alexandra Vecic	6	6
(Spain) Ane Mintegi del Olmo	4	3
(United States) Elizabeth Coleman	6	7
(France) Giulia Morlet	1	5
WC	(Czech Republic) Brenda Fruhvirtová	1	6^{3}
(Ukraine) Daria Lopatetska	6	7^{7}
(France) Séléna Janicijevic	6^{2}	3
8	(Russia) Oksana Selekhmeteva	7^{7}	6

Second round
1	(Andorra) V Jiménez Kasintseva	5	6	3
(Russia) A Charaeva	7	2	6
(Italy) M Paoletti	7^{7}	6^{4}	6
(Russia) A Shcherbinina	6^{5}	7^{7}	1
9	(Germany) A Vecic	2	7^{7}	6
(United States) E Coleman	6	6^{4}	2
(Ukraine) D Lopatetska	6	3	3
8	(Russia) O Selekhmeteva	3	6	6

Third round
(Russia) A Charaeva	6	6
(Italy) M Paoletti	3	1
9	(Germany) A Vecic	2	6	6
8	(Russia) O Selekhmeteva	6	1	4

Quarterfinals
(Russia) A Charaeva	6	6
9	(Germany) A Vecic	2	3

==== Section 2 ====
First round
4	(Russia) Polina Kudermetova	3	6	6
(Belgium) Sofia Costoulas	6	2	2
(Slovenia) Živa Falkner	6	7
WC	(France) Laïa Petretic	4	5
(Germany) Angelina Wirges	0	1
(Hungary) Amarissa Kiara Tóth	6	6
(France) Julie Belgraver	6	6
13	(United States) Elvina Kalieva	3	3
11	(Czech Republic) Linda Fruhvirtová	6	6
(Mexico) Julia García	1	1
(Uruguay) Guillermina Grant	6	4	3
(Russia) Julia Avdeeva	4	6	6
(France) Océane Babel	6	6
(Belarus) Evialina Laskevich	4	3
(Spain) Jéssica Bouzas Maneiro	1	3
6	(Latvia) Kamilla Bartone	6	6

Second round
4	(Russia) P Kudermetova	6	6
(Slovenia) Ž Falkner	2	0
(Hungary) AK Tóth	2	7	6
(France) J Belgraver	6	5	2
11	(Czech Republic) L Fruhvirtová	4	6	3
(Russia) J Avdeeva	6	1	6
(France) O Babel	2	6	7
6	(Latvia) K Bartone	6	3	5

Third round
4	(Russia) P Kudermetova	6	6
(Hungary) AK Tóth	3	1
(Russia) J Avdeeva	6	2	3
(France) O Babel	4	6	6

Quarterfinals
4	(Russia) P Kudermetova	6	7
(France) O Babel	3	5

=== Bottom half ===
==== Section 3 ====
First round
5	(Poland) Weronika Baszak	7	2	3
(Czech Republic) Darja Viďmanová	5	6	6
(Russia) Daria Frayman	3	4
(France) Aubane Droguet	6	6
(Germany) Eva Lys	6	6
(United States) Madison Sieg	4	1
(Russia) Polina Iatcenko	5	2
10	(Belarus) Kristina Dmitruk	7	6
15	(United Kingdom) Matilda Mutavdzic	7	6
WC	(Brazil) Ana Candiotto	5	1
(Russia) Elina Avanesyan	6	6
WC	(France) Anaëlle Leclercq	1	3
(Slovakia) Romana Čisovská	6	6
(Czech Republic) Barbora Palicová	2	2
(Slovenia) Pia Lovrič	5	4
3	(France) Elsa Jacquemot	7	6

Second round
(Czech Republic) D Viďmanová	6	7^{7}
(France) A Droguet	4	6^{5}
(Germany) E Lys	0	0^{r}
10	(Belarus) K Dmitruk	6	3
15	(United Kingdom) M Mutavdzic	6	6
(Russia) E Avanesyan	1	3
(Slovakia) R Čisovská	5	3
3	(France) E Jacquemot	7	6

Third round
(Czech Republic) D Viďmanová	1	6	3
10	(Belarus) K Dmitruk	6	3	6
15	(United Kingdom) M Mutavdzic	3	2
3	(France) E Jacquemot	6	6

Quarterfinals
10	(Belarus) K Dmitruk	4	4
3	(France) E Jacquemot	6	6

==== Section 4 ====
First round
7	(Russia) Maria Bondarenko	7^{7}	4	5
(Croatia) Tara Würth	6^{4}	6	7
(Canada) Jada Bui	4	6^{6}
WC	(France) Flavie Brugnone	6	7^{8}
WC	(France) Lucie Nguyen Tan	6	6
(Italy) Beatrice Ricci	3	0
(Czech Republic) Linda Nosková	6	4	6
12	(United States) Alexandra Yepifanova	3	6	4
16	(Belarus) Jana Kolodynska	4	7	5
(Spain) Leyre Romero Gormaz	6	5	7
(Australia) Tina Nadine Smith	2	6	1
(Russia) Diana Shnaider	6	4	6
WC	(France) Sarah Iliev	4	3
(Germany) Mara Guth	6	6
(Hungary) Natália Szabanin	4	1
2	(Philippines) Alex Eala	6	6

Second round
(Croatia) T Würth	2	4
WC	(France) F Brugnone	6	6
WC	(France) L Nguyen Tan	3	0
(Czech Republic) L Nosková	6	6
(Spain) L Romero Gormaz	6	7
(Russia) D Shnaider	3	5
(Germany) M Guth	1	7	4
2	(Philippines) A Eala	6	5	6

Third round
WC	(France) F Brugnone	1	2
(Czech Republic) L Nosková	6	6
(Spain) L Romero Gormaz	1	6	1
2	(Philippines) A Eala	6	4	6

Quarterfinals
(Czech Republic) L Nosková	6	3	2
2	(Philippines) A Eala	4	6	6
