= 2020 French Open – Girls' doubles =

Girls' doubles
- 2020 French Open

Final
- Champions: (Italy) Eleonora Alvisi (Italy) Lisa Pigato
- Runners-up: (Russia) Maria Bondarenko (Russia) Diana Shnaider
- Score: 7–6^{(7–3)}, 6–4

Events
Singles	men	women		boys	girls
Doubles	men	women	mixed	boys	girls
WC Singles	men	women	quad
WC Doubles	men	women	quad
Legends	−45	45+	women
← 2019 ·	French Open	· 2021 →

Chloe Beck and Emma Navarro were the defending champions, but both players were no longer eligible to participate in junior events.

Eleonora Alvisi and Lisa Pigato won the title, defeating Maria Bondarenko and Diana Shnaider in the final, 7–6^{(7–3)}, 6–4.

== Seeds ==
1. (Poland) Weronika Baszak / (France) Elsa Jacquemot (first round)
2. (Latvia) Kamilla Bartone / (Russia) Oksana Selekhmeteva (semifinals)
3. (Philippines) Alex Eala / (United States) Elvina Kalieva (first round)
4. (Andorra) Victoria Jiménez Kasintseva / (Spain) Ane Mintegi del Olmo (second round)
5. (Russia) Maria Bondarenko / (Russia) Diana Shnaider (final)
6. (Belarus) Kristina Dmitruk / (Belarus) Jana Kolodynska (quarterfinals)
7. (Slovakia) Romana Čisovská / (Czech Republic) Linda Fruhvirtová (second round)
8. (Russia) Polina Kudermetova / (France) Giulia Morlet (first round)

== Draw ==
=== Key ===
- Q = Qualifier
- WC = Wild card
- LL = Lucky loser
- Alt = Alternate
- ITF = ITF entry
- PR = Protected ranking
- SR = Special ranking
- SE = Special exempt
- JE = Junior exempt
- JR = Junior Accelerator Programme entrant
- CO = College Accelerator Programme entrant
- NG = Next Gen Accelerator Program entrant
- w/o = Walkover
- r = Retired
- d = Defaulted

=== Finals ===
Semifinals
(Spain) Jéssica Bouzas Maneiro (Uruguay) Guillermina Grant	7	2	[4]
5	(Russia) Maria Bondarenko (Russia) Diana Shnaider	5	6	[10]
(Italy) Eleonora Alvisi (Italy) Lisa Pigato	6	2	[10]
2	(Latvia) Kamilla Bartone (Russia) Oksana Selekhmeteva	3	6	[7]

Final
5	(Russia) Maria Bondarenko (Russia) Diana Shnaider	6^{3}	4
(Italy) Eleonora Alvisi (Italy) Lisa Pigato	7^{7}	6

=== Top half ===
First round
1	(Poland) Weronika Baszak (France) Elsa Jacquemot	3	3
(Spain) Jéssica Bouzas Maneiro (Uruguay) Guillermina Grant	6	6
(Belgium) Sofia Costoulas (Switzerland) Sebastianna Scilipoti	6	7
(Czech Republic) Barbora Palicová (Czech Republic) Darja Viďmanová	1	5
(Russia) Daria Frayman (United States) Alexandra Yepifanova	2	6	[5]
WC	(France) Anaëlle Leclercq (France) Lucie Nguyen Tan	6	3	[10]
(Russia) Julia Avdeeva (Belarus) Aliona Falei	4	1
6	(Belarus) Kristina Dmitruk (Belarus) Jana Kolodynska	6	6
4	(Andorra) Victoria Jiménez Kasintseva (Spain) Ane Mintegi del Olmo	6	6
(Slovenia) Pia Lovrič (Hungary) Amarissa Kiara Tóth	4	3
(Russia) Polina Iatcenko (Australia) Tina Nadine Smith	7	5	[9]
(France) Julie Belgraver (France) Célia-Belle Mohr	5	7	[11]
(Belarus) Evialina Laskevich (Czech Republic) Linda Nosková	2	6	[10]
(Russia) Alina Shcherbinina (Croatia) Tara Würth	6	0	[7]
(Italy) Beatrice Ricci (Hungary) Natália Szabanin	4	1
5	(Russia) Maria Bondarenko (Russia) Diana Shnaider	6	6

Second round
(Spain) J Bouzas Maneiro (Uruguay) G Grant	6	4	[10]
(Belgium) S Costoulas (Switzerland) S Scilipoti	4	6	[8]
WC	(France) A Leclercq (France) L Nguyen Tan	3	4
6	(Belarus) K Dmitruk (Belarus) J Kolodynska	6	6
4	(Andorra) V Jiménez Kasintseva (Spain) A Mintegi del Olmo	3	1
(France) J Belgraver (France) C-B Mohr	6	6
(Belarus) E Laskevich (Czech Republic) L Nosková	6	0	[6]
5	(Russia) M Bondarenko (Russia) D Shnaider	3	6	[10]

Quarterfinals
(Spain) J Bouzas Maneiro (Uruguay) G Grant	6	6^{6}	[10]
6	(Belarus) K Dmitruk (Belarus) J Kolodynska	3	7^{8}	[8]
(France) J Belgraver (France) C-B Mohr	1	3
5	(Russia) M Bondarenko (Russia) D Shnaider	6	6

Semifinals
(Spain) J Bouzas Maneiro (Uruguay) G Grant	7	2	[4]
5	(Russia) M Bondarenko (Russia) D Shnaider	5	6	[10]

=== Bottom half ===
First round
8	(Russia) Polina Kudermetova (France) Giulia Morlet	5	4
(France) Océane Babel (France) Flavie Brugnone	7	6
WC	(Japan) Mei Hasegawa (Japan) Erika Matsuda	3	7	[10]
(Germany) Mara Guth (Germany) Angelina Wirges	6	5	[5]
(France) Aubane Droguet (France) Séléna Janicijevic	6	6
WC	(Czech Republic) Brenda Fruhvirtová (France) Shanice Roignot	0	4
(Italy) Eleonora Alvisi (Italy) Lisa Pigato	7	2	[10]
3	(Philippines) Alex Eala (United States) Elvina Kalieva	5	6	[7]
7	(Slovakia) Romana Čisovská (Czech Republic) Linda Fruhvirtová	6	6
(Canada) Jada Bui (Italy) Matilde Paoletti	2	2
(United States) Elizabeth Coleman (United States) Madison Sieg	7	6
(Slovenia) Živa Falkner (United Kingdom) Matilda Mutavdzic	5	2
(Mexico) Julia García (Spain) Leyre Romero Gormaz	3	6	[7]
WC	(France) Sarah Iliev (France) Laïa Petretic	6	3	[10]
(Russia) Elina Avanesyan (Russia) Alina Charaeva	4	6	[7]
2	(Latvia) Kamilla Bartone (Russia) Oksana Selekhmeteva	6	1	[10]

Second round
(France) O Babel (France) F Brugnone	6	2	[7]
WC	(Japan) M Hasegawa (Japan) E Matsuda	2	6	[10]
(France) A Droguet (France) S Janicijevic	7	6^{4}	[4]
(Italy) E Alvisi (Italy) L Pigato	5	7^{7}	[10]
7	(Slovakia) R Čisovská (Czech Republic) L Fruhvirtová	4	4
(United States) E Coleman (United States) M Sieg	6	6
WC	(France) S Iliev (France) L Petretic	3	3
2	(Latvia) K Bartone (Russia) O Selekhmeteva	6	6

Quarterfinals
WC	(Japan) M Hasegawa (Japan) E Matsuda	4	0
(Italy) E Alvisi (Italy) L Pigato	6	6
(United States) E Coleman (United States) M Sieg	6	1	[8]
2	(Latvia) K Bartone (Russia) O Selekhmeteva	1	6	[10]

Semifinals
(Italy) E Alvisi (Italy) L Pigato	6	2	[10]
2	(Latvia) K Bartone (Russia) O Selekhmeteva	3	6	[7]
