= 2020 French Open – Wheelchair men's singles =

Wheelchair men's singles
- 2020 French Open

Final
- Champion: (United Kingdom) Alfie Hewett
- Runner-up: (Belgium) Joachim Gérard
- Score: 6–4, 4–6, 6–3

Events
Singles	men	women		boys	girls
Doubles	men	women	mixed	boys	girls
WC Singles	men	women	quad
WC Doubles	men	women	quad
Legends	−45	45+	women
- French Open

Alfie Hewett defeated Joachim Gérard in the final, 6–4, 4–6, 6–3 to win the men's singles wheelchair tennis title at the 2020 French Open. It was his second French Open singles title and fourth major singles title overall.

Gustavo Fernández was the defending champion, but was defeated by Hewett in the semifinals.

== Seeds ==
1. (Japan) Shingo Kunieda (semifinals)
2. (Argentina) Gustavo Fernández (semifinals)

== Draw ==
Key

- Q = Qualifier
- WC = Wild card
- LL = Lucky loser
- Alt = Alternate
- ITF = ITF entry
- PR = Protected ranking
- SR = Special ranking
- SE = Special exempt
- JE = Junior exempt
- JR = Junior Accelerator Programme entrant
- CO = College Accelerator Programme entrant
- NG = Next Gen Accelerator Program entrant
- w/o = Walkover
- r = Retired
- d = Defaulted

=== Finals ===
Quarterfinals
1	(Japan) Shingo Kunieda	6	6
WC	(France) Frédéric Cattaneo	2	0
(France) Nicolas Peifer	4	3
(Belgium) Joachim Gérard	6	6
(France) Stéphane Houdet	5	3
(United Kingdom) Alfie Hewett	7	6
(United Kingdom) Gordon Reid	3	3
2	(Argentina) Gustavo Fernández	6	6

Semifinals
1	(Japan) Shingo Kunieda	5	6	4
(Belgium) Joachim Gérard	7	2	6
(United Kingdom) Alfie Hewett	7^{7}	7
2	(Argentina) Gustavo Fernández	6^{5}	5

Final
(Belgium) Joachim Gérard	4	6	3
(United Kingdom) Alfie Hewett	6	4	6
