= 2020 French Open – Men's doubles =

Men's doubles
- 2020 French Open

Final
- Champions: (Germany) Kevin Krawietz (Germany) Andreas Mies
- Runners-up: (Croatia) Mate Pavić (Brazil) Bruno Soares
- Score: 6–3, 7–5

Details
- Draw: 64
- Seeds: 16

Events
Singles	men	women		boys	girls
Doubles	men	women	mixed	boys	girls
WC Singles	men	women	quad
WC Doubles	men	women	quad
Legends	−45	45+	women
- French Open

Kevin Krawietz and Andreas Mies were the defending champions and successfully defended their title, defeating Mate Pavić and Bruno Soares in the final, 6–3, 7–5.

== Seeds ==
1. (Colombia) Juan Sebastián Cabal / (Colombia) Robert Farah (semifinals)
2. (Spain) Marcel Granollers / (Argentina) Horacio Zeballos (third round)
3. (United States) Rajeev Ram / (United Kingdom) Joe Salisbury (quarterfinals)
4. (Poland) Łukasz Kubot / (Brazil) Marcelo Melo (second round)
5. (Croatia) Ivan Dodig / (Slovakia) Filip Polášek (third round)
6. (France) Pierre-Hugues Herbert / (France) Nicolas Mahut (third round)
7. (Croatia) Mate Pavić / (Brazil) Bruno Soares (final)
8. (Germany) Kevin Krawietz / (Germany) Andreas Mies (champions)

9. (Netherlands) Wesley Koolhof / (Croatia) Nikola Mektić (semifinals)
10. (South Africa) Raven Klaasen / (Austria) Oliver Marach (first round)
11. (Australia) John Peers / (New Zealand) Michael Venus (second round)
12. (Netherlands) Jean-Julien Rojer / (Romania) Horia Tecău (third round)
13. (United Kingdom) Jamie Murray / (United Kingdom) Neal Skupski (quarterfinals)
14. (France) Jérémy Chardy / (France) Fabrice Martin (third round)
15. (Austria) Jürgen Melzer / (France) Édouard Roger-Vasselin (third round)
16. (United States) Austin Krajicek / (Croatia) Franko Škugor (second round)

Click on the seed number of a player to go to their draw section.

== Draw ==
Key

- Q = Qualifier
- WC = Wild card
- LL = Lucky loser
- Alt = Alternate
- ITF = ITF entry
- PR = Protected ranking
- SR = Special ranking
- SE = Special exempt
- JE = Junior exempt
- JR = Junior Accelerator Programme entrant
- CO = College Accelerator Programme entrant
- NG = Next Gen Accelerator Program entrant
- w/o = Walkover
- r = Retired
- d = Defaulted

=== Finals ===
Quarterfinals
1	(Colombia) Juan Sebastián Cabal (Colombia) Robert Farah	6^{10}	6	7^{9}
(Denmark) Frederik Nielsen (Germany) Tim Pütz	7^{12}	4	6^{7}
3	(United States) Rajeev Ram (United Kingdom) Joe Salisbury	6	4	5
7	(Croatia) Mate Pavić (Brazil) Bruno Soares	4	6	7
9	(Netherlands) Wesley Koolhof (Croatia) Nikola Mektić	6	6
(United States) Nicholas Monroe (United States) Tommy Paul	4	4
8	(Germany) Kevin Krawietz (Germany) Andreas Mies	6	6
13	(United Kingdom) Jamie Murray (United Kingdom) Neal Skupski	4	4

Semifinals
1	(Colombia) Juan Sebastián Cabal (Colombia) Robert Farah	6^{4}	5
7	(Croatia) Mate Pavić (Brazil) Bruno Soares	7^{7}	7
9	(Netherlands) Wesley Koolhof (Croatia) Nikola Mektić	3	5
8	(Germany) Kevin Krawietz (Germany) Andreas Mies	6	7

Final
7	(Croatia) Mate Pavić (Brazil) Bruno Soares	3	5
8	(Germany) Kevin Krawietz (Germany) Andreas Mies	6	7

=== Top half ===
==== Section 1 ====
First round
1	(Colombia) JS Cabal (Colombia) R Farah	3	6	6
WC	(France) C Denolly (France) K Jacquet	6	2	3
(Sweden) R Lindstedt (Australia) J Thompson	2	6	7
(Netherlands) R Haase (Portugal) J Sousa	6	3	5
(Italy) S Bolelli (Argentina) M González	2	6	7
(Mexico) S González (United Kingdom) K Skupski	6	2	5
WC	(France) E Couacaud (France) A Olivetti	5	3
15	(Austria) J Melzer (France) É Roger-Vasselin	7	6
11	(Australia) J Peers (New Zealand) M Venus	4	6	6
(Serbia) M Kecmanović (Norway) C Ruud	6	3	2
(Denmark) F Nielsen (Germany) T Pütz	6	6
(Italy) L Sonego (Italy) S Travaglia	4	4
(Lithuania) R Berankis (Japan) Y Nishioka	4	3
Alt	(Slovenia) A Bedene (Austria) D Novak	6	6
(Finland) H Kontinen (Germany) J-L Struff	3	1
5	(Croatia) I Dodig (Slovakia) F Polášek	6	6

Second round
1	(Colombia) JS Cabal (Colombia) R Farah	6	6
(Sweden) R Lindstedt (Australia) J Thompson	4	3
(Italy) S Bolelli (Argentina) M González	4	7	4
15	(Austria) J Melzer (France) É Roger-Vasselin	6	5	6
11	(Australia) J Peers (New Zealand) M Venus	6^{3}	3
(Denmark) F Nielsen (Germany) T Pütz	7^{7}	6
Alt	(Slovenia) A Bedene (Austria) D Novak	3	6	1
5	(Croatia) I Dodig (Slovakia) F Polášek	6	3	6

Third round
1	(Colombia) JS Cabal (Colombia) R Farah	4	7^{7}	7^{7}
15	(Austria) J Melzer (France) É Roger-Vasselin	6	6^{3}	6^{3}
(Denmark) F Nielsen (Germany) T Pütz	7	5	6
5	(Croatia) I Dodig (Slovakia) F Polášek	5	7	4

Quarterfinals
1	(Colombia) JS Cabal (Colombia) R Farah	6^{10}	6	7^{9}
(Denmark) F Nielsen (Germany) T Pütz	7^{12}	4	6^{7}

==== Section 2 ====
First round
3	(United States) R Ram (United Kingdom) J Salisbury	6	7^{7}
WC	(France) G Barrère (France) Q Halys	4	6^{1}
(Serbia) N Ćaćić (Serbia) D Lajović	4	7^{7}	6^{5}
(Australia) A de Minaur (Australia) M Reid	6	6^{4}	7^{7}
(United States) M McDonald (United States) T Sandgren	4	6	2
(Hungary) M Fucsovics (United Kingdom) C Norrie	6	2	6
(Australia) J Duckworth (Australia) J Millman	7^{7}	4	0
14	(France) J Chardy (France) F Martin	6^{5}	6	6
12	(Netherlands) J-J Rojer (Romania) H Tecău	6	0
(Chile) C Garín (Spain) P Martínez	1	0^{r}
(El Salvador) M Arévalo (United Kingdom) J O'Mara	6	6
(Italy) G Mager (Spain) A Ramos Viñolas	1	2
(Argentina) A Molteni (Monaco) H Nys	4	6	6
(Belgium) S Gillé (Belgium) J Vliegen	6	3	3
(New Zealand) M Daniell (Austria) P Oswald	2	3
7	(Croatia) M Pavić (Brazil) B Soares	6	6

Second round
3	(United States) R Ram (United Kingdom) J Salisbury	6	6
(Australia) A de Minaur (Australia) M Reid	3	1
(Hungary) M Fucsovics (United Kingdom) C Norrie	6^{2}	2
14	(France) J Chardy (France) F Martin	7^{7}	6
12	(Netherlands) J-J Rojer (Romania) H Tecău	6	6
(El Salvador) M Arévalo (United Kingdom) J O'Mara	3	2
(Argentina) A Molteni (Monaco) H Nys	5	4
7	(Croatia) M Pavić (Brazil) B Soares	7	6

Third round
3	(United States) R Ram (United Kingdom) J Salisbury	6	6
14	(France) J Chardy (France) F Martin	3	2
12	(Netherlands) J-J Rojer (Romania) H Tecău	5	6	3
7	(Croatia) M Pavić (Brazil) B Soares	7	1	6

Quarterfinals
3	(United States) R Ram (United Kingdom) J Salisbury	6	4	5
7	(Croatia) M Pavić (Brazil) B Soares	4	6	7

=== Bottom half ===
==== Section 3 ====
First round
6	(France) P-H Herbert (France) N Mahut	6	6
(Australia) M Purcell (Australia) L Saville	1	2
(India) R Bopanna (Canada) D Shapovalov	2	2
(Canada) V Pospisil (United States) J Sock	6	6
(Moldova) R Albot (Georgia (country)) N Basilashvili	4	6	3
(Argentina) L Mayer (Argentina) G Pella	6	1	6
(United Kingdom) L Bambridge (Japan) B McLachlan	4	6^{4}
9	(Netherlands) W Koolhof (Croatia) N Mektić	6	7^{7}
16	(United States) A Krajicek (Croatia) F Škugor	6	4	6
(South Korea) S-w Kwon (India) D Sharan	2	6	4
WC	(France) H Gaston (France) U Humbert	4	1
(Uruguay) P Cuevas (Spain) F López	6	6
(Uruguay) A Behar (Ecuador) G Escobar	3	7	6^{4}
(United States) N Monroe (United States) T Paul	6	5	7^{7}
WC	(France) A Cazaux (France) H Mayot	2	2
4	(Poland) Ł Kubot (Brazil) M Melo	6	6

Second round
6	(France) P-H Herbert (France) N Mahut	2	7^{10}	6
(Canada) V Pospisil (United States) J Sock	6	6^{8}	4
(Argentina) L Mayer (Argentina) G Pella	6^{2}	3
9	(Netherlands) W Koolhof (Croatia) N Mektić	7^{7}	6
16	(United States) A Krajicek (Croatia) F Škugor	5	4
(Uruguay) P Cuevas (Spain) F López	7	6
(United States) N Monroe (United States) T Paul	7	2	6
4	(Poland) Ł Kubot (Brazil) M Melo	5	6	3

Third round
6	(France) P-H Herbert (France) N Mahut	2	6^{3}
9	(Netherlands) W Koolhof (Croatia) N Mektić	6	7^{7}
(Uruguay) P Cuevas (Spain) F López	4	7	6^{7}
(United States) N Monroe (United States) T Paul	6	5	7^{9}

Quarterfinals
9	(Netherlands) W Koolhof (Croatia) N Mektić	6	6
(United States) N Monroe (United States) T Paul	4	4

==== Section 4 ====
First round
8	(Germany) K Krawietz (Germany) A Mies	6	6
(Kazakhstan) A Bublik (Kazakhstan) M Kukushkin	2	3
Alt	(New Zealand) A Sitak (Slovakia) I Zelenay	6^{4}	6	4
(Argentina) F Coria (Argentina) D Schwartzman	7^{7}	3	6
(France) A Mannarino (France) B Paire	7	7
(United States) F Tiafoe (United States) J Withrow	5	5
WC	(France) B Bonzi (France) A Hoang	6	3	6
10	(South Africa) R Klaasen (Austria) O Marach	3	6	2
13	(United Kingdom) J Murray (United Kingdom) N Skupski	6	4	7
(Argentina) JI Londero (Czech Republic) J Veselý	4	6	5
WC	(France) M Guinard (France) A Rinderknech	6^{6}	6	7
(United Kingdom) D Inglot (Pakistan) A-u-H Qureshi	7^{8}	3	5
(United Kingdom) D Evans (Poland) H Hurkacz	7^{7}	3	7
(Brazil) M Demoliner (Netherlands) M Middelkoop	6^{2}	6	5
(United States) S Johnson (United States) S Querrey	6	3	6^{4}
2	(Spain) M Granollers (Argentina) H Zeballos	3	6	7^{7}

Second round
8	(Germany) K Krawietz (Germany) A Mies	6	6
(Argentina) F Coria (Argentina) D Schwartzman	2	0
(France) A Mannarino (France) B Paire	3	1
WC	(France) B Bonzi (France) A Hoang	6	6
13	(United Kingdom) J Murray (United Kingdom) N Skupski	4	6	7^{7}
WC	(France) M Guinard (France) A Rinderknech	6	4	6^{3}
(United Kingdom) D Evans (Poland) H Hurkacz	2	2
2	(Spain) M Granollers (Argentina) H Zeballos	6	6

Third round
8	(Germany) K Krawietz (Germany) A Mies	6	1	7^{7}
WC	(France) B Bonzi (France) A Hoang	4	6	6^{5}
13	(United Kingdom) J Murray (United Kingdom) N Skupski	6	4	6
2	(Spain) M Granollers (Argentina) H Zeballos	3	6	4

Quarterfinals
8	(Germany) K Krawietz (Germany) A Mies	6	6
13	(United Kingdom) J Murray (United Kingdom) N Skupski	4	4

== Other entry information ==
=== Wild cards ===
- (France) Grégoire Barrère / (France) Quentin Halys
- (France) Benjamin Bonzi / (France) Antoine Hoang
- (France) Arthur Cazaux / (France) Harold Mayot
- (France) Enzo Couacaud / (France) Albano Olivetti
- (France) Corentin Denolly / (France) Kyrian Jacquet
- (France) Hugo Gaston / (France) Ugo Humbert
- (France) Manuel Guinard / (France) Arthur Rinderknech

=== Withdrawals ===
- (Spain) Alejandro Davidovich Fokina / (Spain) Fernando Verdasco (Verdasco withdrew after testing positive for COVID-19)
- (Ukraine) Denys Molchanov / (Russia) Andrey Rublev (Rublev withdrew while still competing in Hamburg and opting to focus on singles match)

=== Alternate pairs ===
- (Slovenia) Aljaž Bedene / (Austria) Dennis Novak
- (New Zealand) Artem Sitak / (Slovakia) Igor Zelenay
