= 2023 Australian Open – Day-by-day summaries =

The 2023 Australian Open described in detail, in the form of day-by-day summaries.

All dates are AEDT (UTC+11)

== Day 1 (16 January) ==
- Seeds out:
  - Men's singles: (Italy) Lorenzo Musetti [17], (Croatia) Borna Ćorić [21]
  - Women's singles: (Czech Republic) Marie Bouzková [25], (United States) Amanda Anisimova [28]
- Schedule of Play

Matches on Main Courts
Matches on Rod Laver Arena
Event	Winner	Loser	Score	Notes
Women's singles 1st Round	(United States) Coco Gauff [7]	(Czech Republic) Kateřina Siniaková	6–1, 6–4	
Women's singles 1st Round	(Greece) Maria Sakkari [6]	(China) Yuan Yue	6–1, 6–4	
Men's singles 1st Round	(Spain) Rafael Nadal [1]	(United Kingdom) Jack Draper	7–5, 2–6, 6–4, 6–1	
Women's singles 1st Round	(Poland) Iga Świątek [1]	(Germany) Jule Niemeier	6–4, 7–5	
Men's singles 1st Round	Daniil Medvedev [7]	(United States) Marcos Giron	6–0, 6–1, 6–2	
Matches on Margaret Court Arena
Event	Winner	Loser	Score	Notes
Women's singles 1st Round	(United States) Jessica Pegula [3]	(Romania) Jaqueline Cristian (PR)	6–0, 6–1	
Men's singles 1st Round	(Poland) Hubert Hurkacz [10]	(Spain) Pedro Martínez	7–6^{(7–1)}, 6–2, 6–2	
Women's singles 1st Round	Victoria Azarenka [24]	(United States) Sofia Kenin (PR)	6–4, 7–6^{(7–3)}	
Men's singles 1st Round	(Greece) Stefanos Tsitsipas [3]	(France) Quentin Halys	6–3, 6–4, 7–6^{(8–6)}	
Women's singles 1st Round	(United States) Madison Keys [10]	Anna Blinkova	6–4, 3–6, 6–2	
Matches on John Cain Arena
Event	Winner	Loser	Score	Notes
Men's singles 1st Round	(Italy) Jannik Sinner [15]	(United Kingdom) Kyle Edmund (PR)	6–4, 6–0, 6–2	
Women's singles 1st Round	(Czech Republic) Petra Kvitová [15]	(Belgium) Alison Van Uytvanck	7–6^{(7–3)}, 6–2	
Men's singles 1st Round	(Australia) Jason Kubler (WC)	(Argentina) Sebastián Báez	6–4, 6–4, 6–4	
Men's singles 1st Round (Note: This match was originally scheduled to play on Kia Arena but was moved to John Cain Arena following Paula Badosa's withdrawal from the tournament. The originally scheduled match was later moved to Court 16.)	(Canada) Félix Auger-Aliassime [6]	(Canada) Vasek Pospisil	1–6, 7–6^{(7–4)}, 7–6^{(7–3)}, 6–3	
Matches on Kia Arena
Event	Winner	Loser	Score	Notes
Women's singles 1st Round	(United States) Danielle Collins [13]	Anna Kalinskaya	7–5, 5–7, 6–4	
Men's singles 1st Round	(United States) Frances Tiafoe [16]	(Germany) Daniel Altmaier	6–3, 6–3, 6–7^{(5–7)}, 7–6^{(8–6)}	
Men's singles 1st Round (Note: This match was originally scheduled to play on Court 3 but was moved to Kia Arena.)	(United Kingdom) Cameron Norrie [11]	(France) Luca Van Assche (WC)	7–6^{(7–3)}, 6–0, 6–3	
Matches on 1573 Arena
Event	Winner	Loser	Score	Notes
Women's singles - 1st round	(United Kingdom) Emma Raducanu	(Germany) Tamara Korpatsch	6–3, 6–2	
Men's singles 1st Round	(Canada) Denis Shapovalov [20]	(Serbia) Dušan Lajović	6–4, 4–6, 6–4, 6–1	
Women's singles - 1st round	(Czech Republic) Barbora Krejčíková [20]	(Czech Republic) Sára Bejlek (Q)	6–3, 6–1	
Men's singles 1st Round	(Slovakia) Alex Molčan	(Switzerland) Stan Wawrinka (PR)	6–7 ^{(3–7)}, 6–3, 1–6, 7–6 ^{(7–2)}, 6–4	
Coloured background indicates a night match
Day matches began at 11 am, whilst Night matches began at 7 pm AEDT

== Day 2 (17 January) ==
Play was halted for most of the afternoon, due to extreme heat policy. In the evening, a torrential rain fell, cancelling play on the outside courts.

- Seeds out:
  - Men's singles: (Italy) Matteo Berrettini [13], (Serbia) Miomir Kecmanović [26]
  - Women's singles: (Italy) Martina Trevisan [21], (Estonia) Kaia Kanepi [31]
- Schedule of Play

Matches on Main Courts
Matches on Rod Laver Arena
Event	Winner	Loser	Score
Women's singles 1st Round	Aryna Sabalenka [5]	(Czech Republic) Tereza Martincová	6–1, 6–4
Women's singles 1st Round	(France) Caroline Garcia [4]	(Canada) Katherine Sebov (Q)	6–3, 6–0
Men's singles 1st Round	(United Kingdom) Andy Murray	(Italy) Matteo Berrettini [13]	6–3, 6–3, 4–6, 6–7^{(7–9)}, 7–6^{(10–6)}
Women's singles 1st Round	(Tunisia) Ons Jabeur [2]	(Slovenia) Tamara Zidanšek	7–6^{(10–8)}, 4–6, 6–1
Men's singles 1st Round	(Serbia) Novak Djokovic [4]	(Spain) Roberto Carballés Baena	6–3, 6–4, 6–0
Matches on Margaret Court Arena
Event	Winner	Loser	Score
Women's singles 1st Round	(Belgium) Elise Mertens [26]	(Spain) Garbiñe Muguruza	3–6, 7–6^{(7–3)}, 6–1
Women's singles 1st Round	(Czech Republic) Karolína Plíšková [30]	(China) Wang Xiyu	6–1, 6–3
Men's singles 1st Round	(Germany) Alexander Zverev [12]	(Peru) Juan Pablo Varillas	4–6, 6–1, 5–7, 7–6^{(7–3)}, 6–4
Women's singles 1st Round	(Switzerland) Belinda Bencic [12]	(Bulgaria) Viktoriya Tomova	6–1, 6–2
Men's singles 1st Round	(Norway) Casper Ruud [2]	(Czech Republic) Tomáš Macháč	6–3, 7–6^{(8–6)}, 6–7^{(5–7)}, 6–3
Matches on John Cain Arena
Event	Winner	Loser	Score
Men's singles 1st Round	Andrey Rublev [5]	(Austria) Dominic Thiem (WC)	6–3, 6–4, 6–2
Men's singles 1st Round	(United States) Taylor Fritz [8]	(Georgia (country)) Nikoloz Basilashvili	6–4, 6–2, 4–6, 7–5
Women's singles 1st Round	Veronika Kudermetova [9]	(Belgium) Maryna Zanevska	6–2, 7–6^{(7–4)}
Men's singles 1st Round (Note: This match was originally scheduled to play on Court 8 but was moved to John Cain Arena following Nick Kyrgios's withdrawal from the tournament. The originally scheduled match was later moved to Court 8.)	(Australia) Alex de Minaur [22]	(Chinese Taipei) Hsu Yu-hsiou (Q)	6–2, 6–2, 6–3
Men's singles 1st Round (Note: This match was originally scheduled to play on Court 7 but was moved to John Cain Arena due to heavy rain in outdoor matches.)	(Australia) Alexei Popyrin (WC)	(Chinese Taipei) Tseng Chun-hsin	4–6, 7–6^{(7–5)}, 6–7^{(5–7)}, 7–6^{(7–4)}, 6–1
Matches on Kia Arena
Event	Winner	Loser	Score
Women's singles 1st Round	(Australia) Kimberly Birrell (WC)	(Estonia) Kaia Kanepi [31]	3–6, 7–6^{(7–4)}, 6–1
Men's singles 1st Round	(Denmark) Holger Rune [9]	(Serbia) Filip Krajinović	6–2, 6–3, 6–4
Men's singles 1st Round	(Australia) Thanasi Kokkinakis vs. (Italy) Fabio Fognini		6–1, 6–2, 4–2, suspended
Matches on 1573 Arena
Event	Winner	Loser	Score
Men's singles 1st Round	(Bulgaria) Grigor Dimitrov [27]	Aslan Karatsev	7–6^{(7–3)}, 7–5, 6–2
Women's singles 1st Round	(Estonia) Anett Kontaveit [16]	(Austria) Julia Grabher	6–2, 6–3
Women's singles 1st Round	Liudmila Samsonova [18]	(Italy) Jasmine Paolini	6–2, 6–4
Men's singles 1st Round	(Australia) Aleksandar Vukic (Q) vs. (United States) Brandon Holt (Q)		4–6, 6–1, 2–4, suspended
Coloured background indicates a night match
Day matches began at 11 am (12 pm on John Cain Arena), whilst Night matches began at 7 pm AEDT

== Day 3 (18 January) ==
Rain disrupted play in all of the outdoor courts for over six hours at 17:30. Three of the five main courts (with retractable roofs) were actively open for the remainder of the session. The doubles matches were rescheduled to Day 4 in order to complete some 1st Round singles matches.

- Seeds out:
  - Men's singles: (Spain) Rafael Nadal [1], (Netherlands) Botic van de Zandschulp [32]
  - Women's singles: Daria Kasatkina [8], (Brazil) Beatriz Haddad Maia [14], (Czech Republic) Petra Kvitová [15], (China) Zheng Qinwen [29], (Switzerland) Jil Teichmann [32]
- Schedule of Play

Matches on Main Courts
Matches on Rod Laver Arena
Event	Winner	Loser	Score
Women's singles 2nd Round	(Poland) Iga Świątek [1]	(Colombia) Camila Osorio	6–2, 6–3
Women's singles 2nd Round	(United States) Jessica Pegula [3]	Aliaksandra Sasnovich	6–2, 7–6^{(7–5)}
Men's singles 2nd Round	(United States) Mackenzie McDonald	(Spain) Rafael Nadal [1]	6–4, 6–4, 7–5
Women's singles 2nd Round	(United States) Coco Gauff [7]	(United Kingdom) Emma Raducanu	6–3, 7–6^{(7–4)}
Men's singles 2nd Round	(Greece) Stefanos Tsitsipas [3]	(Australia) Rinky Hijikata (WC)	6–4, 6–0, 6–2
Matches on Margaret Court Arena
Event	Winner	Loser	Score
Women's singles 2nd Round	(Greece) Maria Sakkari [6]	Diana Shnaider (Q)	3–6, 7–5, 6–3
Men's singles 2nd Round	(Canada) Félix Auger-Aliassime [6]	(Slovakia) Alex Molčan	3–6, 3–6, 6–3, 6–2, 6–2
Women's singles 2nd Round	(United States) Madison Keys [10]	(China) Wang Xinyu	6–3, 6–2
Men's singles 2nd Round	Daniil Medvedev [7]	(Australia) John Millman (WC)	7–5, 6–2, 6–2
Women's singles 2nd Round	(United States) Danielle Collins [13]	(Czech Republic) Karolína Muchová (PR)	6–7^{(1–7)}, 6–2, 7–6^{(10–6)}
Matches on John Cain Arena
Event	Winner	Loser	Score
Men's singles 2nd Round	(Italy) Jannik Sinner [15]	(Argentina) Tomás Martín Etcheverry	6–3, 6–2, 6–2
Women's singles 2nd Round	(Ukraine) Anhelina Kalinina	(Czech Republic) Petra Kvitová [15]	7–5, 6–4
Men's singles 2nd Round	(United States) Frances Tiafoe [16]	(China) Shang Juncheng (Q)	6–4, 6–4, 6–1
Men's singles 2nd Round	Karen Khachanov [18]	(Australia) Jason Kubler (WC)	6–4, 5–7, 6–4, 6–2
Women's singles 2nd Round	(Kazakhstan) Elena Rybakina [22]	(Slovenia) Kaja Juvan	6–2, 6–1
Matches on Kia Arena
Event	Winner	Loser	Score
Women's singles 2nd Round	(Spain) Cristina Bucșa (Q)	(Canada) Bianca Andreescu	2–6, 7–6^{(9–7)}, 6–4
Men's singles 1st Round	(Australia) Thanasi Kokkinakis	(Italy) Fabio Fognini	6–1, 6–2, 6–2
Women's singles 2nd Round	(Ukraine) Marta Kostyuk	(Australia) Olivia Gadecki (WC)	6–2, 6–1
Women's singles 2nd Round	Victoria Azarenka [24]	(Argentina) Nadia Podoroska (PR)	6–1, 6–0
Matches on 1573 Arena
Event	Winner	Loser	Score
Women's singles 2nd Round	(Czech Republic) Barbora Krejčíková [20]	(France) Clara Burel (Q)	6–4, 6–1
Men's singles 1st Round	(United States) Brandon Holt (Q)	(Australia) Aleksandar Vukic (Q)	6–4, 1–6, 6–3, 3–6, 6–3
Men's singles 2nd Round	(Canada) Denis Shapovalov [20]	(Japan) Taro Daniel	6–3, 7–6^{(7–3)}, 7–5
Coloured background indicates a night match
Day matches began at 11 am (12 pm on John Cain Arena), whilst Night matches began at 7 pm AEDT

== Day 4 (19 January) ==
The second round match between Andy Murray and Thanasi Kokkinakis lasted 5 hours and 45 minutes, with Murray won in fifth sets that it ended at 4:06 am AEDT, twenty-eight minutes shy of the latest night match finish since Lleyton Hewitt and Marcos Baghdatis in the 2008 Australian Open fifteen years exactly to this date. The match became the second longest match in the Australian Open history following the epic 2012 men's singles final.

- Seeds out:
  - Men's singles: (Norway) Casper Ruud [2], (United States) Taylor Fritz [8], (Germany) Alexander Zverev [12], (Spain) Pablo Carreño Busta [14], (Argentina) Diego Schwartzman [23], (Spain) Alejandro Davidovich Fokina [30]
  - Women's singles: (Tunisia) Ons Jabeur [2], Veronika Kudermetova [9], (Estonia) Anett Kontaveit [16], Liudmila Samsonova [18], (Romania) Irina-Camelia Begu [27]
  - Men's doubles: (Brazil) Rafael Matos / (Spain) David Vega Hernández [13]
  - Women's doubles: (Ukraine) Lyudmyla Kichenok / (Latvia) Jeļena Ostapenko [5], (Poland) Alicja Rosolska / (New Zealand) Erin Routliffe [14]
- Schedule of Play

Matches on Main Courts
Matches on Rod Laver Arena
Event	Winner	Loser	Score
Women's singles 2nd Round	Aryna Sabalenka [5]	(United States) Shelby Rogers	6–3, 6–1
Men's singles 2nd Round	(United States) Jenson Brooksby	(Norway) Casper Ruud [2]	6–3, 7–5, 6–7^{(4–7)}, 6–2
Women's singles 2nd Round	(France) Caroline Garcia [4]	(Canada) Leylah Fernandez	7–6^{(7–5)}, 7–5
Men's singles 2nd Round	(Serbia) Novak Djokovic [4]	(France) Enzo Couacaud (Q)	6–1, 6–7^{(5–7)}, 6–2, 6–0
Women's singles 2nd Round	(Czech Republic) Markéta Vondroušová (PR)	(Tunisia) Ons Jabeur [2]	6–1, 5–7, 6–1
Matches on Margaret Court Arena
Event	Winner	Loser	Score
Women's singles 2nd Round	(United States) Katie Volynets (Q)	Veronika Kudermetova [9]	6–4, 2–6, 6–2
Women's singles 2nd Round	(Poland) Magda Linette	(Estonia) Anett Kontaveit [16]	3–6, 6–3, 6–4
Men's singles 2nd Round	(United States) Michael Mmoh (LL)	(Germany) Alexander Zverev [12]	6–7^{(1–7)}, 6–4, 6–3, 6–2
Women's singles 2nd Round	(Switzerland) Belinda Bencic [12]	(United States) Claire Liu	7–6^{(7–3)}, 6–3
Men's singles 2nd Round	(United Kingdom) Andy Murray	(Australia) Thanasi Kokkinakis	4–6, 6–7^{(4–7)}, 7–6^{(7–5)}, 6–3, 7–5
Matches on John Cain Arena
Event	Winner	Loser	Score
Women's singles 2nd Round	Ekaterina Alexandrova [19]	(United States) Taylor Townsend (WC)	1–6, 6–2, 6–3
Women's singles 2nd Round	(Belgium) Elise Mertens [26]	(United States) Lauren Davis	6–4, 6–3
Men's singles 2nd Round	(Australia) Alexei Popyrin (WC)	(United States) Taylor Fritz [8]	6–7^{(4–7)}, 7–6^{(7–2)}, 6–4, 6–7^{(6–8)}, 6–2
Men's singles 2nd Round	(Australia) Alex de Minaur [22]	(France) Adrian Mannarino	7–6^{(7–3)}, 4–6, 6–4, 6–1
Matches on Kia Arena
Event	Winner	Loser	Score
Women's doubles 1st Round	(Chinese Taipei) Chan Hao-ching [11] (China) Yang Zhaoxuan [11]	(France) Alizé Cornet (WC) (Australia) Samantha Stosur (WC)	6–3, 6–4
Men's singles 1st Round	Andrey Rublev [5]	(Finland) Emil Ruusuvuori	6–2, 6–4, 6–7^{(2–7)}, 6–3
Women's singles 2nd Round	(Czech Republic) Linda Fruhvirtová	(Australia) Kimberly Birrell (WC)	6–3, 6–2
Men's singles 2nd Round	(Denmark) Holger Rune [9]	(United States) Maxime Cressy	7–5, 6–4, 6–4
Matches on 1573 Arena
Event	Winner	Loser	Score
Men's doubles 1st Round	(Netherlands) Wesley Koolhof [1] (United Kingdom) Neal Skupski [1]	(Kazakhstan) Alexander Bublik (Australia) John-Patrick Smith	6–1, 6–2
Men's singles 2nd Round	(United States) Ben Shelton	(Chile) Nicolás Jarry (Q)	7–6^{(7–3)}, 7–6^{(7–3)}, 7–5
Women's singles 2nd Round	(Czech Republic) Karolína Plíšková [30]	(Kazakhstan) Yulia Putintseva	6–0, 7–5
Men's singles 2nd Round	(Bulgaria) Grigor Dimitrov [27]	(Serbia) Laslo Đere	6–3, 6–2, 6–0
Coloured background indicates a night match
Day matches began at 11 am, whilst Night matches began at 7 pm AEDT

== Day 5 (20 January) ==
- Seeds out:
  - Men's singles: Daniil Medvedev [7], (United Kingdom) Cameron Norrie [11], (United States) Frances Tiafoe [16], (Canada) Denis Shapovalov [20], (Argentina) Francisco Cerúndolo [28]
  - Women's singles: (Greece) Maria Sakkari [6], (United States) Madison Keys [10], (United States) Danielle Collins [13]
  - Men's doubles: (Italy) Simone Bolelli / (Italy) Fabio Fognini [9], (India) Rohan Bopanna / (Australia) Matthew Ebden [10], (United Kingdom) Jamie Murray / (New Zealand) Michael Venus [11]
  - Women's doubles: (Belgium) Kirsten Flipkens / (Germany) Laura Siegemund [13]
  - Mixed doubles: (United States) Jessica Pegula / (United States) Austin Krajicek [2], (Poland) Alicja Rosolska / (Netherlands) Jean-Julien Rojer [7]
- Schedule of Play

Matches on Main Courts
Matches on Rod Laver Arena
Event	Winner	Loser	Score
Women's singles 3rd Round	(Czech Republic) Barbora Krejčíková [20]	(Ukraine) Anhelina Kalinina	6–2, 6–3
Men's singles 3rd Round	(Greece) Stefanos Tsitsipas [3]	(Netherlands) Tallon Griekspoor	6–2, 7–6^{(7–5)}, 6–3
Women's singles 3rd Round	(United States) Coco Gauff [7]	(United States) Bernarda Pera	6–3, 6–2
Women's singles 3rd Round	Victoria Azarenka [24]	(United States) Madison Keys [10]	1–6, 6–2, 6–1
Men's singles 3rd Round	(United States) Sebastian Korda [29]	Daniil Medvedev [7]	7–6^{(9–7)}, 6–3, 7–6^{(7–4)}
Matches on Margaret Court Arena
Event	Winner	Loser	Score
Men's singles 3rd Round	(Italy) Jannik Sinner [15]	(Hungary) Márton Fucsovics	4–6, 4–6, 6–1, 6–2, 6–0
Women's singles 3rd Round	(United States) Jessica Pegula [3]	(Ukraine) Marta Kostyuk	6–0, 6–2
Women's singles 3rd Round	(Poland) Iga Świątek [1]	(Spain) Cristina Bucșa (Q)	6–0, 6–1
Men's singles 3rd Round	(Poland) Hubert Hurkacz [10]	(Canada) Denis Shapovalov [20]	7–6^{(7–3)}, 6–4, 1–6, 4–6, 6–3
Women's singles 3rd Round	(China) Zhu Lin	(Greece) Maria Sakkari [6]	7–6^{(7–3)}, 1–6, 6–4
Matches on John Cain Arena
Event	Winner	Loser	Score
Men's doubles 1st Round	(Australia) Max Purcell (Australia) Jordan Thompson	(Argentina) Guillermo Durán (Austria) Philipp Oswald	6–3, 6–4
Women's doubles 1st Round	(Australia) Storm Hunter [4] (Belgium) Elise Mertens [4]	Veronika Kudermetova; Liudmila Samsonova	2–6, 7–6^{(8–6)}, 6–1
Men's singles 3rd Round	(Canada) Félix Auger-Aliassime [6]	(Argentina) Francisco Cerúndolo [28]	6–1, 3–6, 6–1, 6–4
Men's singles 3rd Round	Karen Khachanov [18]	(United States) Frances Tiafoe [16]	6–3, 6–4, 3–6, 7–6^{(11–9)}
Matches on Kia Arena
Event	Winner	Loser	Score
Women's doubles 1st Round	(United States) Nicole Melichar-Martinez [9] (Australia) Ellen Perez [9]	Ekaterina Alexandrova (Germany) Vivian Heisen	6–2, 6–1
Men's doubles 1st Round	(Australia) Alex Bolt (WC) (Australia) Luke Saville (WC)	(Argentina) Federico Coria (Argentina) Diego Schwartzman	6–2, 6–4
Women's singles 3rd Round	(Kazakhstan) Elena Rybakina [22]	(United States) Danielle Collins [13]	6–2, 5–7, 6–2
Men's singles 3rd Round	(Czech Republic) Jiří Lehečka	(United Kingdom) Cameron Norrie [11]	6–7^{(8–10)}, 6–3, 3–6, 6–1, 6–4
Matches on 1573 Arena
Event	Winner	Loser	Score
Women's doubles 1st Round	(Canada) Gabriela Dabrowski [3] (Mexico) Giuliana Olmos [3]	(Romania) Irina-Camelia Begu (United States) Shelby Rogers	4–6, 6–2, 6–2
Women's doubles 1st Round	(Czech Republic) Linda Fruhvirtová (United States) Alison Riske-Amritraj	(Georgia (country)) Natela Dzalamidze; Alexandra Panova	6–7^{(4–7)}, 6–4, 7–5
Women's singles 3rd Round	(Latvia) Jeļena Ostapenko [17]	(Ukraine) Kateryna Baindl	6–3, 6–0
Men's doubles 1st Round	(France) Benjamin Bonzi (France) Arthur Rinderknech	(Australia) John Millman (WC) (Australia) Aleksandar Vukic (WC)	6–2, 7–6^{(7–3)}
Mixed doubles 1st Round	(Latvia) Jeļena Ostapenko (Spain) David Vega Hernández	(Chinese Taipei) Chan Hao-ching (New Zealand) Michael Venus	6–2, 6–7^{(5–7)}, [10–6]
Coloured background indicates a night match
Day matches began at 11 am, whilst Night matches began at 7 pm AEDT

== Day 6 (21 January) ==
- Seeds out:
  - Men's singles: (United Kingdom) Dan Evans [25], (Bulgaria) Grigor Dimitrov [27]
  - Women's singles: Ekaterina Alexandrova [19], (Belgium) Elise Mertens [26]
  - Men's doubles: (Croatia) Nikola Mektić / (Croatia) Mate Pavić [4], (Croatia) Ivan Dodig / (United States) Austin Krajicek [5], (United Kingdom) Lloyd Glasspool / (Finland) Harri Heliövaara [6], (Mexico) Santiago González / (France) Édouard Roger-Vasselin [15]
  - Women's doubles: (United States) Nicole Melichar-Martinez / (Australia) Ellen Perez [9], (United States) Asia Muhammad / (United States) Taylor Townsend [12]
  - Mixed doubles: (Japan) Ena Shibahara / (Netherlands) Wesley Koolhof [4]
- Schedule of Play

Matches on Main Courts
Matches on Rod Laver Arena
Event	Winner	Loser	Score
Women's singles 3rd Round	(Czech Republic) Karolína Plíšková [30]	Varvara Gracheva	6–4, 6–2
Women's singles 3rd Round	(Switzerland) Belinda Bencic [12]	(Italy) Camila Giorgi	6–2, 7–5
Men's singles 3rd Round	(Australia) Alex de Minaur [22]	(France) Benjamin Bonzi	7–6^{(7–0)}, 6–2, 6–1
Men's singles 3rd Round	(Serbia) Novak Djokovic [4]	(Bulgaria) Grigor Dimitrov [27]	7–6^{(9–7)}, 6–3, 6–4
Women's singles 3rd Round	(Poland) Magda Linette	Ekaterina Alexandrova [19]	6–3, 6–4
Matches on Margaret Court Arena
Event	Winner	Loser	Score
Women's singles 3rd Round	(Croatia) Donna Vekić	(Spain) Nuria Párrizas Díaz	6–2, 6–2
Men's singles 3rd Round	Andrey Rublev [5]	(United Kingdom) Dan Evans [25]	6–4, 6–2, 6–3
Women's singles 3rd Round	Aryna Sabalenka [5]	(Belgium) Elise Mertens [26]	6–2, 6–3
Men's singles 3rd Round	(Spain) Roberto Bautista Agut [24]	(United Kingdom) Andy Murray	6–1, 6–7^{(7–9)}, 6–3, 6–4
Men's doubles 2nd Round	(Australia) Rinky Hijikata (WC) (Australia) Jason Kubler (WC)	(United Kingdom) Lloyd Glasspool [6] (Finland) Harri Heliövaara [6]	3–6, 7–5, 6–2
Matches on John Cain Arena
Event	Winner	Loser	Score
Women's doubles 2nd Round	(Ukraine) Marta Kostyuk (Romania) Elena-Gabriela Ruse	(United States) Nicole Melichar-Martinez [9] (Australia) Ellen Perez [9]	3–6, 7–6^{(9–7)}, 6–0
Men's singles 3rd Round	(Denmark) Holger Rune [9]	(France) Ugo Humbert	6–4, 6–2, 7–6^{(7–5)}
Men's doubles 2nd Round	(Germany) Andreas Mies [14] (Australia) John Peers [14]	(Sweden) André Göransson (Switzerland) Marc-Andrea Hüsler	6–4, 7–6^{(7–5)}
Men's singles 3rd Round	(United States) Ben Shelton	(Australia) Alexei Popyrin (WC)	6–3, 7–6^{(7–4)}, 6–4
Matches on Kia Arena
Event	Winner	Loser	Score
Women's doubles 2nd Round	Anastasia Pavlyuchenkova (Kazakhstan) Elena Rybakina	(Chinese Taipei) Latisha Chan (Chile) Alexa Guarachi	6–1, 6–0
Men's doubles 2nd Round	(Netherlands) Wesley Koolhof [1] (United Kingdom) Neal Skupski [1]	(Greece) Petros Tsitsipas (Greece) Stefanos Tsitsipas	7–6^{(8–6)}, 4–6, 7–6^{(10–7)}
Men's singles 3rd Round	(United States) J. J. Wolf	(United States) Michael Mmoh (LL)	6–4, 6–1, 6–2
Women's singles 3rd Round	(France) Caroline Garcia [4]	(Germany) Laura Siegemund (PR)	1–6, 6–3, 6–3
Men's doubles 2nd Round	(Serbia) Nikola Ćaćić (Pakistan) Aisam-ul-Haq Qureshi	(Mexico) Santiago González [15] (France) Édouard Roger-Vasselin [15]	7–6^{(7–1)}, 7–6^{(7–4)}
Matches on 1573 Arena
Event	Winner	Loser	Score
Men's doubles 2nd Round	(South Africa) Lloyd Harris (South Africa) Raven Klaasen	(France) Sadio Doumbia (France) Fabien Reboul	6–4, 6–4
Women's singles 3rd Round	(China) Zhang Shuai [23]	(United States) Katie Volynets (Q)	6–3, 6–2
Women's singles 3rd Round	(Czech Republic) Linda Fruhvirtová	(Czech Republic) Markéta Vondroušová (PR)	7–5, 2–6, 6–3
Mixed doubles 1st Round	(Australia) Olivia Gadecki (WC) (Australia) Marc Polmans (WC)	(Japan) Ena Shibahara [4] (Netherlands) Wesley Koolhof [4]	6–2, 6–2
Women's doubles 2nd Round	(Czech Republic) Barbora Krejčíková [1] (Czech Republic) Kateřina Siniaková [1]	(Czech Republic) Linda Fruhvirtová (United States) Alison Riske-Amritraj	6–2, 6–2
Coloured background indicates a night match
Day matches began at 11 am, whilst Night matches began at 7 pm AEDT

== Day 7 (22 January) ==
- Seeds out:
  - Men's singles: (Canada) Félix Auger-Aliassime [6], (Poland) Hubert Hurkacz [10], (Italy) Jannik Sinner [15], (Japan) Yoshihito Nishioka [31]
  - Women's singles: (Poland) Iga Świątek [1], (United States) Coco Gauff [7], (Czech Republic) Barbora Krejčíková [20]
  - Women's doubles: (Brazil) Beatriz Haddad Maia / (China) Zhang Shuai [7], (India) Sania Mirza / (Kazakhstan) Anna Danilina [8]
  - Mixed doubles: (Croatia) Nikola Mektić / (Netherlands) Demi Schuurs [5], (Canada) Gabriela Dabrowski / (Australia) Max Purcell [8]
- Schedule of Play

Matches on Main Courts
Matches on Rod Laver Arena
Event	Winner	Loser	Score
Men's legends doubles	(United States) Bob Bryan (United States) Mike Bryan	(Cyprus) Marcos Baghdatis (Australia) Mark Philippoussis	6–1, 6–4
Women's singles 4th Round	(Kazakhstan) Elena Rybakina [22]	(Poland) Iga Świątek [1]	6–4, 6–4
Men's singles 4th Round	(United States) Sebastian Korda [29]	(Poland) Hubert Hurkacz [10]	3–6, 6–3, 6–2, 1–6, 7–6^{(10–7)}
Men's singles 4th Round	(Greece) Stefanos Tsitsipas [3]	(Italy) Jannik Sinner [15]	6–4, 6–4, 3–6, 4–6, 6–3
Women's singles 4th Round	Victoria Azarenka [24]	(China) Zhu Lin	4–6, 6–1, 6–4
Matches on Margaret Court Arena
Event	Winner	Loser	Score
Mixed doubles 2nd Round	(Brazil) Luisa Stefani (Brazil) Rafael Matos	(United States) Bethanie Mattek-Sands (Croatia) Mate Pavić	6–4, 6–4
Women's singles 4th Round	(Latvia) Jeļena Ostapenko [17]	(United States) Coco Gauff [7]	7–5, 6–3
Men's singles 4th Round	(Czech Republic) Jiří Lehečka	(Canada) Félix Auger-Aliassime [6]	4–6, 6–3, 7–6^{(7–2)}, 7–6^{(7–3)}
Matches on John Cain Arena
Event	Winner	Loser	Score
Women's doubles 2nd Round	(Australia) Storm Hunter [4] (Belgium) Elise Mertens [4]	(Hungary) Tímea Babos (France) Kristina Mladenovic	6–3, 6–3
Men's singles 4th Round	Karen Khachanov [18]	(Japan) Yoshihito Nishioka [31]	6–0, 6–0, 7–6^{(7–4)}
Women's singles 4th Round	(United States) Jessica Pegula [3]	(Czech Republic) Barbora Krejčíková [20]	7–5, 6–2
Matches on Kia Arena
Event	Winner	Loser	Score
Men's doubles 2nd Round	(France) Jérémy Chardy (France) Fabrice Martin	(India) Sriram Balaji (ALT) (India) Jeevan Nedunchezhiyan (ALT)	6–4, 6–4
Men's doubles 2nd Round	(France) Benjamin Bonzi (France) Arthur Rinderknech	(Colombia) Nicolás Barrientos (Uruguay) Ariel Behar	6–7^{(5–7)}, 6–3, 7–6^{(10–2)}
Men's doubles 2nd Round	(Monaco) Hugo Nys (Poland) Jan Zieliński	(Australia) Max Purcell (Australia) Jordan Thompson	4–6, 6–4, 7–6^{(10–7)}
Men's doubles 2nd Round	(United States) Rajeev Ram [2] (United Kingdom) Joe Salisbury [2]	(Australia) Marc Polmans (WC) (Australia) Alexei Popyrin (WC)	7–6^{(8–6)}, 4–6, 6–3
Mixed doubles 2nd Round	(Australia) Lizette Cabrera (WC) (Australia) John-Patrick Smith (WC)	(Canada) Gabriela Dabrowski [8] (Australia) Max Purcell [8]	2–6, 7–5, [10–7]
Coloured background indicates a night match
Day matches began at 11 am, whilst Night matches began at 7 pm AEDT

== Day 8 (23 January) ==
- Seeds out:
  - Men's singles: (Denmark) Holger Rune [9], (Australia) Alex de Minaur [22], (Spain) Roberto Bautista Agut [24]
  - Women's singles: (France) Caroline Garcia [4], (Switzerland) Belinda Bencic [12], (China) Zhang Shuai [23]
  - Men's doubles: (United States) Rajeev Ram / (United Kingdom) Joe Salisbury [2], (Colombia) Juan Sebastián Cabal / (Colombia) Robert Farah [12], (Netherlands) Matwé Middelkoop / (Netherlands) Robin Haase [16]
  - Women's doubles: (Japan) Miyu Kato / (Indonesia) Aldila Sutjiadi [16]
  - Mixed doubles: (El Salvador) Marcelo Arévalo / (Mexico) Giuliana Olmos [1]
- Schedule of Play

Matches on Main Courts
Matches on Rod Laver Arena
Event	Winner	Loser	Score
Women's singles 4th Round	Aryna Sabalenka [5]	(Switzerland) Belinda Bencic [12]	7–5, 6–2
Women's singles 4th Round	(Poland) Magda Linette	(France) Caroline Garcia [4]	7–6^{(7–3)}, 6–4
Men's singles 4th Round	Andrey Rublev [5]	(Denmark) Holger Rune [9]	6–3, 3–6, 6–3, 4–6, 7–6^{(11–9)}
Men's singles 4th Round	(Serbia) Novak Djokovic [4]	(Australia) Alex de Minaur [22]	6–2, 6–1, 6–2
Women's doubles 3rd Round	(Australia) Storm Hunter (Belgium) Elise Mertens [4]	(Switzerland) Viktorija Golubic (Romania) Monica Niculescu	6–2, 6–2
Matches on Margaret Court Arena
Event	Winner	Loser	Score
Mixed legends doubles	(Zimbabwe) Cara Black (United States) Mike Bryan	(Austria) Barbara Schett (United States) Bob Bryan	6–3, 7–5
Women's singles 4th Round	(Croatia) Donna Vekić	(Czech Republic) Linda Fruhvirtová	6–2, 1–6, 6–3
Men's doubles 3rd Round	(Australia) Rinky Hijikata (WC) (Australia) Jason Kubler (WC)	(Bosnia and Herzegovina) Tomislav Brkić (Ecuador) Gonzalo Escobar	1–6, 7–6^{(10–8)}, 6–4
Men's singles 4th Round	(United States) Tommy Paul	(Spain) Roberto Bautista Agut [24]	6–2, 4–6, 6–2, 7–5
Matches on John Cain Arena
Event	Winner	Loser	Score
Women's doubles 3rd Round	(Japan) Shuko Aoyama [10] (Japan) Ena Shibahara [10]	Anastasia Pavlyuchenkova (Kazakhstan) Elena Rybakina	6–2, 7–6^{(9–7)}
Women's doubles 3rd Round	(Chinese Taipei) Chan Hao-ching [11] (China) Yang Zhaoxuan [11]	(Ukraine) Anhelina Kalinina (Belgium) Alison Van Uytvanck	6–3, 7–5
Men's singles 4th Round	(United States) Ben Shelton	(United States) J. J. Wolf	6–7^{(5–7)}, 6–2, 6–7^{(4–7)}, 7–6^{(7–4)}, 6–2
Women's doubles 3rd Round	(Czech Republic) Barbora Krejčíková [1] (Czech Republic) Kateřina Siniaková [1]	(Georgia (country)) Oksana Kalashnikova (United States) Alycia Parks	6–0, 6–3
Matches on Kia Arena
Event	Winner	Loser	Score
Men's doubles 3rd Round	(Netherlands) Wesley Koolhof [1] (United Kingdom) Neal Skupski [1]	(Croatia) Nikola Ćaćić (Pakistan) Aisam-ul-Haq Qureshi	6–4, 6–2
Women's singles 4th Round	(Czech Republic) Karolína Plíšková [30]	(China) Zhang Shuai [23]	6–0, 6–4
Women's doubles 3rd Round	(United States) Coco Gauff [2] (United States) Jessica Pegula [2]	(Japan) Miyu Kato [16] (Indonesia) Aldila Sutjiadi [16]	6–4, 6–2
Men's doubles 3rd Round	(Germany) Andreas Mies [14] (Australia) John Peers [14]	(Australia) Alex Bolt (WC) (Australia) Luke Saville (WC)	6–0, 6–3
Mixed doubles 2nd Round	(Latvia) Jeļena Ostapenko (Spain) David Vega Hernández	(Mexico) Giuliana Olmos [1] (El Salvador) Marcelo Arévalo [1]	6–7^{(4–7)}, 7–6^{(8–6)}, [10–8]
Mixed doubles 2nd Round	(Australia) Olivia Gadecki (WC) (Australia) Marc Polmans (WC)	(Australia) Kimberly Birrell (WC) (Australia) Rinky Hijikata (WC)	6–0, 6–2
Coloured background indicates a night match
Day matches began at 11 am, whilst Night matches began at 7 pm AEDT

== Day 9 (24 January) ==
- Seeds out:
  - Men's singles: (United States) Sebastian Korda [29]
  - Women's singles: (United States) Jessica Pegula [3], (Latvia) Jeļena Ostapenko [17]
  - Men's doubles: (El Salvador) Marcelo Arévalo / (Netherlands) Jean-Julien Rojer [3]
  - Women's doubles: (Canada) Gabriela Dabrowski / (Mexico) Giuliana Olmos [3]
- Schedule of Play

Matches on Main Courts
Matches on Rod Laver Arena
Event	Winner	Loser	Score
Mixed doubles Quarterfinals	(Brazil) Luisa Stefani (Brazil) Rafael Matos	(Australia) Lizette Cabrera (WC) (Australia) John-Patrick Smith (WC)	6–3, 6–4
Women's singles Quarterfinals	(Kazakhstan) Elena Rybakina [22]	(Latvia) Jeļena Ostapenko [17]	6–2, 6–4
Men's singles Quarterfinals	Karen Khachanov [18]	(United States) Sebastian Korda [29]	7–6^{(7–5)}, 6–2, 3–0 retired
Women's singles Quarterfinals	Victoria Azarenka [24]	(United States) Jessica Pegula [3]	6–4, 6–1
Men's singles Quarterfinals	(Greece) Stefanos Tsitsipas [3]	(Czech Republic) Jiří Lehečka	6–3, 7–6^{(7–2)}, 6–4
Matches on Margaret Court Arena
Event	Winner	Loser	Score
Wheelchair Men's singles 1st Round	(Spain) Martin De la Puente	(Australia) Ben Weekes (WC)	7–5, 6–2
Wheelchair Women's singles 1st Round	(Netherlands) Aniek van Koot [3]	(Colombia) Angélica Bernal	6–1, 7–5
Women's doubles 3rd Round	(United States) Caroline Dolehide; Anna Kalinskaya	(Canada) Gabriela Dabrowski [3] (Mexico) Giuliana Olmos [3]	7–5, 6–2
Quad Wheelchair singles Quarterfinals	(Netherlands) Niels Vink [1]	(Brazil) Ymanitu Silva	6–1, 6–0
Women's doubles 3rd Round	(United States) Desirae Krawczyk [6] (Netherlands) Demi Schuurs [6]	(Slovakia) Tereza Mihalíková; Aliaksandra Sasnovich	6–3, 6–1
Mixed doubles Quarterfinals	(Australia) Olivia Gadecki (WC) (Australia) Marc Polmans (WC)	(Australia) Maddison Inglis (WC) (Australia) Jason Kubler (WC)	6–3, 6–2
Matches on Kia Arena
Event	Winner	Loser	Score
Wheelchair Men's singles 1st Round	(Argentina) Gustavo Fernández [2]	(Netherlands) Ruben Spaargaren	6–3, 6–2
Wheelchair Women's singles 1st Round	(Netherlands) Diede de Groot [1]	(South Africa) Kgothatso Montjane	6–1, 6–1
Men's doubles Quarterfinals	(France) Jérémy Chardy (France) Fabrice Martin	(El Salvador) Marcelo Arévalo [3] (Netherlands) Jean-Julien Rojer [3]	6–3, 2–6, 7–6^{(10–4)}
Mixed doubles Quarterfinals	(India) Sania Mirza (India) Rohan Bopanna	(Latvia) Jeļena Ostapenko (Spain) David Vega Hernández	Walkover
Coloured background indicates a night match
Day matches began at 11 am, whilst Night matches began at 7 pm AEDT

== Day 10 (25 January) ==
- Seeds out:
  - Men's singles: Andrey Rublev [5]
  - Women's singles: (Czech Republic) Karolína Plíšková [30]
  - Men's doubles: (Netherlands) Wesley Koolhof / (United Kingdom) Neal Skupski [1], (Germany) Andreas Mies / (Australia) John Peers [14]
  - Women's doubles: (Australia) Storm Hunter / (Belgium) Elise Mertens [4], (United States) Desirae Krawczyk / (Netherlands) Demi Schuurs [6], (Chinese Taipei) Chan Hao-ching / (China) Yang Zhaoxuan [11]
  - Mixed doubles: (United States) Desirae Krawczyk / (United Kingdom) Neal Skupski [3]
- Schedule of Play

Matches on Main Courts
Matches on Rod Laver Arena
Event	Winner	Loser	Score
Women's singles Quarterfinals	(Poland) Magda Linette	(Czech Republic) Karolína Plíšková [30]	6–3, 7–5
Women's singles Quarterfinals	Aryna Sabalenka [5]	(Croatia) Donna Vekić	6–3, 6–2
Men's singles Quarterfinals	(United States) Tommy Paul	(United States) Ben Shelton	7–6^{(8–6)}, 6–3, 5–7, 6–4
Men's singles Quarterfinals	(Serbia) Novak Djokovic [4]	Andrey Rublev [5]	6–1, 6–2, 6–4
Mixed doubles Semifinals	(Brazil) Luisa Stefani (Brazil) Rafael Matos	(Australia) Olivia Gadecki (WC) (Australia) Marc Polmans (WC)	6–4, 4–6, [11–9]
Matches on Margaret Court Arena
Event	Winner	Loser	Score
Wheelchair women's Quarterfinals	(Netherlands) Diede de Groot [1]	(Japan) Momoko Ohtani	6–4, 6–0
Women's doubles Quarterfinals	(Ukraine) Marta Kostyuk (Romania) Elena-Gabriela Ruse	(Australia) Storm Hunter [4] (Belgium) Elise Mertens [4]	7–6^{(8–6)}, 2–6, 6–4
Women's doubles Quarterfinals	(United States) Coco Gauff [2] (United States) Jessica Pegula [2]	(Chinese Taipei) Chan Hao-ching [11] (China) Yang Zhaoxuan [11]	6–1, 6–1
Quad wheelchair doubles Semifinals	(Netherlands) Sam Schröder [1] (Netherlands) Niels Vink [1]	(Australia) Heath Davidson (United States) David Wagner	6–0, 6–1
Mixed doubles Semifinals	(India) Sania Mirza (India) Rohan Bopanna	(United States) Desirae Krawczyk [3] (United Kingdom) Neal Skupski [3]	7–6^{(7–5)}, 6–7^{(5–7)}, [10–6]
Matches on Kia Arena
Event	Winner	Loser	Score
Men's doubles Quarterfinals	(Spain) Marcel Granollers [8] (Argentina) Horacio Zeballos [8]	(Germany) Andreas Mies [14] (Australia) John Peers [14]	6–4, 6–7^{(2–7)}, 6–2
Men's doubles Quarterfinals	(Australia) Rinky Hijikata (WC) (Australia) Jason Kubler (WC)	(Netherlands) Wesley Koolhof [1] (United Kingdom) Neal Skupski [1]	6–3, 6–1
Wheelchair men's doubles Quarterfinals	(United Kingdom) Alfie Hewett [2] (United Kingdom) Gordon Reid [2]	(Belgium) Joachim Gérard (Japan) Takuya Miki	6–0, 6–3
Wheelchair women's doubles Quarterfinals	(Japan) Yui Kamiji [2] (China) Zhu Zhenzhen [2]	(Netherlands) Jiske Griffioen (Japan) Momoko Ohtani	6–2, 6–0
Coloured background indicates a night match
Day matches began at 11 am, whilst Night matches began at 7 pm AEDT

== Day 11 (26 January) ==
- Seeds out:
  - Women's singles: Victoria Azarenka [24]
  - Men's doubles: (Spain) Marcel Granollers / (Argentina) Horacio Zeballos [8]
- Schedule of Play

Matches on Main Courts
Matches on Rod Laver Arena
Event	Winner	Loser	Score
Women's legends doubles	(Slovakia) Daniela Hantuchová (Poland) Agnieszka Radwańska	(Croatia) Iva Majoli (Austria) Barbara Schett	6–3, 6–3
Men's doubles Semifinals	(Monaco) Hugo Nys (Poland) Jan Zieliński	(France) Jérémy Chardy (France) Fabrice Martin	6–3, 5–7, 6–2
Men's doubles Semifinals	(Australia) Rinky Hijikata (WC) (Australia) Jason Kubler (WC)	(Spain) Marcel Granollers [8] (Argentina) Horacio Zeballos [8]	6–4, 6–2
Women's singles Semifinals	(Kazakhstan) Elena Rybakina [22]	Victoria Azarenka [24]	7–6^{(7–4)}, 6–3
Women's singles Semifinals	Aryna Sabalenka [5]	(Poland) Magda Linette	7–6^{(7–1)}, 6–2
Matches on Margaret Court Arena
Event	Winner	Loser	Score
Men's legends doubles	(Cyprus) Marcos Baghdatis (Australia) Mark Philippoussis	(Germany) Tommy Haas (Czech Republic) Radek Štěpánek	6–4, 6–3
Girls' singles Quarterfinals	Alina Korneeva [9]	(Czech Republic) Tereza Valentová [2]	7–5, 3–6, 6–0
Wheelchair quad singles Semifinals	(Netherlands) Niels Vink [1]	(South Africa) Donald Ramphadi	6–3, 6–0
Wheelchair quad singles Semifinals	(Netherlands) Sam Schröder [2]	(United States) David Wagner	6–0, 6–3
Boys' doubles Semifinals	(Belgium) Alexander Blockx [1] (Brazil) João Fonseca [1]	(Australia) Cooper Errey (WC) (Australia) Marcus Schoeman (WC)	7–5, 7–6^{(7–1)}
Matches on Kia Arena
Event	Winner	Loser	Score
Wheelchair men's singles Semifinals	(United Kingdom) Alfie Hewett [1]	(Japan) Takuya Miki	6–1, 6–1
Wheelchair women's singles Semifinals	(Japan) Yui Kamiji [2]	(Netherlands) Jiske Griffioen [4]	6–2, 6–1
Wheelchair men's doubles Semifinals	(United Kingdom) Alfie Hewett [2] (United Kingdom) Gordon Reid [2]	(Japan) Daisuke Arai (Japan) Takashi Sanada	6–4, 6–4
Wheelchair women's doubles Semifinals	(Netherlands) Diede de Groot [1] (Netherlands) Aniek van Koot [1]	(United States) Dana Mathewson (United Kingdom) Lucy Shuker	6–2, 6–1
Coloured background indicates a night match
Day matches began at 11 am, whilst Night matches began at 7 pm AEDT

== Day 12 (27 January) ==
- Seeds out:
  - Men's singles: Karen Khachanov [18]
  - Women's doubles: (United States) Coco Gauff / (United States) Jessica Pegula [2]
- Schedule of Play

Matches on Main Courts
Matches on Rod Laver Arena
Event	Winner	Loser	Score
Mixed doubles Final	(Brazil) Luisa Stefani (Brazil) Rafael Matos	(India) Sania Mirza (India) Rohan Bopanna	7–6^{(7–2)}, 6–2
Men's singles Semifinals	(Greece) Stefanos Tsitsipas [3]	Karen Khachanov [18]	7–6^{(7–2)}, 6–4, 6–7^{(6–8)}, 6–3
Men's singles Semifinals	(Serbia) Novak Djokovic [4]	(United States) Tommy Paul	7–5, 6–1, 6–2
Matches on Margaret Court Arena
Event	Winner	Loser	Score
Women's doubles Semifinals	(Czech Republic) Barbora Krejčíková [1] (Czech Republic) Kateřina Siniaková [1]	(Ukraine) Marta Kostyuk (Romania) Elena-Gabriela Ruse	6–2, 6–2
Women's doubles Semifinals	(Japan) Shuko Aoyama [10] (Japan) Ena Shibahara [10]	(United States) Coco Gauff [2] (United States) Jessica Pegula [2]	6–2, 7–6^{(9–7)}
Men's Legends doubles 1st round	(United States) Bob Bryan (United States) Mike Bryan	(Cyprus) Marcos Baghdatis (Czech Republic) Radek Štěpánek	6–4, 6–3
Coloured background indicates a night match
Day matches began at 11 am, whilst Night matches began at 7 pm AEDT

== Day 13 (28 January) ==
- Seeds out:
  - Women's singles: (Kazakhstan) Elena Rybakina [22]
- Schedule of Play

Matches on Main Courts
Matches on Rod Laver Arena
Event	Winner	Loser	Score
Girls' singles Final	Alina Korneeva [9]	Mirra Andreeva [7]	6–7^{(2–7)}, 6–4, 7–5
Boys' singles Final	(Belgium) Alexander Blockx [3]	(United States) Learner Tien	6–1, 2–6, 7–6^{(11–9)}
Women's singles Final	Aryna Sabalenka [5]	(Kazakhstan) Elena Rybakina [22]	4–6, 6–3, 6–4
Men's doubles Final	(Australia) Rinky Hijikata (WC) (Australia) Jason Kubler (WC)	(Monaco) Hugo Nys (Poland) Jan Zieliński	6–4, 7–6^{(7–4)}
Matches on Margaret Court Arena
Event	Winner	Loser	Score
Wheelchair women's singles Final	(Netherlands) Diede de Groot [1]	(Japan) Yui Kamiji [2]	0–6, 6–2, 6–2
Wheelchair quad singles Final	(Netherlands) Sam Schröder [2]	(Netherlands) Niels Vink [1]	6–2, 7–5
Wheelchair men's singles Final	(United Kingdom) Alfie Hewett [1]	(Japan) Tokito Oda [3]	6–3, 6–1
Coloured background indicates a night match
Day matches began at 11 am, whilst Night matches began at 7 pm AEDT

== Day 14 (29 January) ==
- Seeds out:
  - Men's singles: (Greece) Stefanos Tsitsipas [3]
  - Women's doubles: (Japan) Shuko Aoyama / (Japan) Ena Shibahara [10]
- Schedule of Play

Matches on Main Courts
Matches on Rod Laver Arena
Event	Winner	Loser	Score
Women's doubles Final	(Czech Republic) Barbora Krejčíková [1] (Czech Republic) Kateřina Siniaková [1]	(Japan) Shuko Aoyama [10] (Japan) Ena Shibahara [10]	6–4, 6–3
Men's singles Final	(Serbia) Novak Djokovic [4]	(Greece) Stefanos Tsitsipas [3]	6–3, 7–6^{(7–4)}, 7–6^{(7–5)}
Coloured background indicates a night match
Day matches began at 11 am, whilst Night matches began at 7 pm AEDT
