= 2020 French Open – Boys' singles =

Boys' singles
- 2020 French Open

Final
- Champion: (Switzerland) Dominic Stricker
- Runner-up: (Switzerland) Leandro Riedi
- Score: 6–2, 6–4

Events
Singles	men	women		boys	girls
Doubles	men	women	mixed	boys	girls
WC Singles	men	women	quad
WC Doubles	men	women	quad
Legends	−45	45+	women
- French Open

Dominic Stricker won the title, defeating Leandro Riedi in an all-Swiss final, 6–2, 6–4.

Holger Rune was the defending champion, but chose not to participate.

== Seeds ==
1. (France) Harold Mayot (second round)
2. (France) Arthur Cazaux (third round)
3. (Latvia) Kārlis Ozoliņš (first round)
4. (Brazil) Natan Rodrigues (second round)
5. (China) Li Hanwen (second round)
6. (Italy) Luciano Darderi (second round)
7. (Switzerland) Dominic Stricker (champion)
8. (Switzerland) Leandro Riedi (final)

9. (United Kingdom) Arthur Fery (third round)
10. (Romania) Nicholas David Ionel (first round)
11. (South Africa) Khololwam Montsi (second round)
12. (Switzerland) Jeffrey von der Schulenburg (second round)
13. (Italy) Flavio Cobolli (first round)
14. (Brazil) Gustavo Heide (third round)
15. (France) Martin Breysach (third round)
16. (Czech Republic) Dalibor Svrčina (first round)

Click on the seed number of a player to go to their draw section.

== Draw ==
Key

- Q = Qualifier
- WC = Wild card
- LL = Lucky loser
- Alt = Alternate
- ITF = ITF entry
- PR = Protected ranking
- SR = Special ranking
- SE = Special exempt
- JE = Junior exempt
- JR = Junior Accelerator Programme entrant
- CO = College Accelerator Programme entrant
- NG = Next Gen Accelerator Program entrant
- w/o = Walkover
- r = Retired
- d = Defaulted

=== Finals ===
Quarterfinals
(Austria) Lukas Neumayer	3	3
7	(Switzerland) Dominic Stricker	6	6
(Argentina) Juan Bautista Torres	7^{7}	6^{5}	6
(France) Lilian Marmousez	6^{4}	7^{7}	1
8	(Switzerland) Leandro Riedi	4	6	6
(Argentina) Alex Barrena	6	1	2
WC	(France) Sean Cuenin	3	4
(Netherlands) Guy den Ouden	6	6

Semifinals
7	(Switzerland) Dominic Stricker	6	5	6
(Argentina) Juan Bautista Torres	0	7	0
8	(Switzerland) Leandro Riedi	6	6
(Netherlands) Guy den Ouden	3	1

Final
7	(Switzerland) Dominic Stricker	6	6
8	(Switzerland) Leandro Riedi	2	4

=== Top half ===
==== Section 1 ====
First round
1	(France) Harold Mayot	6	6
(Brazil) Bruno Oliveira	1	1
(Serbia) Hamad Međedović	7	6
(Japan) Kokoro Isomura	5	3
(Belgium) Raphaël Collignon	6	3	6
(Poland) Maks Kaśnikowski	4	6	4
(Austria) Lukas Neumayer	3	7^{7}	7^{7}
13	(Italy) Flavio Cobolli	6	6^{4}	6^{5}
9	(United Kingdom) Arthur Fery	6	6
WC	(France) Mehdi Sadaoui	4	3
(Spain) Mario Mansilla Díez	6	6
(United States) Bruno Kuzuhara	2	4
(Mexico) Rafael Alfonso de Alba Valdés	2	0
(Czech Republic) Martin Krumich	6	6
WC	(France) Max Westphal	4	2
7	(Switzerland) Dominic Stricker	6	6

Second round
1	(France) H Mayot	5	6	3
(Serbia) H Međedović	7	4	6
(Belgium) R Collignon	4	2
(Austria) L Neumayer	6	6
9	(United Kingdom) A Fery	6	6
(Spain) M Mansilla Díez	1	0
(Czech Republic) M Krumich	5	3
7	(Switzerland) D Stricker	7	6

Third round
(Serbia) H Međedović	1	3
(Austria) L Neumayer	6	6
9	(United Kingdom) A Fery	4	3
7	(Switzerland) D Stricker	6	6

Quarterfinals
(Austria) L Neumayer	3	3
7	(Switzerland) D Stricker	6	6

==== Section 2 ====
First round
3	(Latvia) Kārlis Ozoliņš	4	0
(Argentina) Juan Bautista Torres	6	6
(Russia) Egor Agafonov	2	7	6
(Spain) Diego Augusto Barreto Sánchez	6	5	1
WC	(India) Dev Javia	4	6	3
WC	(France) Antoine Ghibaudo	6	3	6
(Romania) Sebastian Gima	3	5
14	(Brazil) Gustavo Heide	6	7
12	(Switzerland) Jeffrey von der Schulenburg	6	6
(France) Giovanni Mpetshi Perricard	4	4
(Italy) Luca Nardi	6	7^{7}
(Germany) Max Wiskandt	4	6^{3}
(United States) Dali Blanch	4	3
(France) Lilian Marmousez	6	6
(Belgium) Romain Faucon	1	6^{1}
5	(China) Li Hanwen	6	7^{7}

Second round
(Argentina) JB Torres	6	7^{7}
(Russia) E Agafonov	3	6^{4}
WC	(France) A Ghibaudo	4	5
14	(Brazil) G Heide	6	7
12	(Switzerland) J von der Schulenburg	3	2
(Italy) L Nardi	6	6
(France) L Marmousez	6	6
5	(China) H Li	2	0

Third round
(Argentina) JB Torres	6	6
14	(Brazil) G Heide	3	3
(Italy) L Nardi	6	2	3
(France) L Marmousez	2	6	6

Quarterfinals
(Argentina) JB Torres	7^{7}	6^{5}	6
(France) L Marmousez	6^{4}	7^{7}	1

=== Bottom half ===
==== Section 3 ====
First round
8	(Switzerland) Leandro Riedi	6	6
WC	(France) Luca Van Assche	0	4
(Sweden) Måns Dahlberg	2	1
(Hungary) Péter Fajta	6	6
(Italy) Leonardo Malgaroli	7	4	3
(United Kingdom) Felix Gill	5	6	6
WC	(France) Axel Garcian	2	2
11	(South Africa) Khololwam Montsi	6	6
15	(France) Martin Breysach	6	6
(United States) Maxwell McKennon	4	2
(Ivory Coast) Eliakim Coulibaly	4	6	7^{7}
(Russia) Marat Sharipov	6	3	6^{4}
(Spain) Pablo Llamas Ruiz	0	5
(Argentina) Alex Barrena	6	7
(Italy) Samuel Vincent Ruggeri	6	4	0
4	(Brazil) Natan Rodrigues	3	6	6

Second round
8	(Switzerland) L Riedi	6	6
(Hungary) P Fajta	1	4
(United Kingdom) F Gill	6	6^{4}	6
11	(South Africa) K Montsi	4	7^{7}	3
15	(France) M Breysach	6	6
(Ivory Coast) E Coulibaly	4	4
(Argentina) A Barrena	6	6
4	(Brazil) N Rodrigues	2	1

Third round
8	(Switzerland) L Riedi	7	6
(United Kingdom) F Gill	5	0
15	(France) M Breysach	6^{3}	5
(Argentina) A Barrena	7^{7}	7

Quarterfinals
8	(Switzerland) L Riedi	4	6	6
(Argentina) A Barrena	6	1	2

==== Section 4 ====
First round
6	(Italy) Luciano Darderi	6	6
(Japan) Shunsuke Mitsui	1	4
(Denmark) Elmer Møller	5	4
WC	(France) Arthur Fils	7	6
(United States) Alexander Bernard	0	2
(Belgium) Alexander Hoogmartens	6	6
WC	(France) Sean Cuenin	6	2	6
10	(Romania) Nicholas David Ionel	0	6	3
16	(Czech Republic) Dalibor Svrčina	4	1
(France) Térence Atmane	6	6
(Venezuela) Lorenzo Claverie	7^{7}	3	2
(Netherlands) Guy den Ouden	6^{5}	6	6
(Poland) Mikołaj Lorens	4	7^{7}	2
(Brazil) Pedro Boscardin Dias	6	6^{5}	6
(Switzerland) Jérôme Kym	6^{12}	3
2	(France) Arthur Cazaux	7^{14}	6

Second round
6	(Italy) L Darderi	6	2	3
WC	(France) A Fils	1	6	6
(Belgium) A Hoogmartens	5	6	1
WC	(France) S Cuenin	7	3	6
(France) T Atmane	6	3	2
(Netherlands) G den Ouden	3	6	6
(Brazil) P Boscardin Dias	3	2
2	(France) A Cazaux	6	6

Third round
WC	(France) A Fils	1	3
WC	(France) S Cuenin	6	6
(Netherlands) G den Ouden	6	6
2	(France) A Cazaux	4	4

Quarterfinals
WC	(France) S Cuenin	3	4
(Netherlands) G den Ouden	6	6
