= Mara Gae =

Romanian tennis player (born 2005)

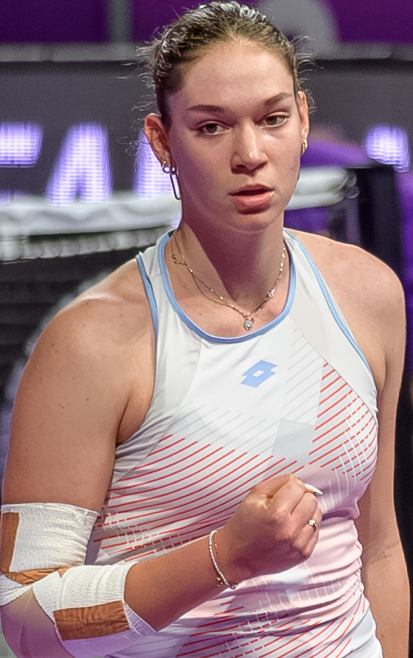
- Gae at the 2026 Transylvania Open
- Country (sports): Romania
- Born: 14 September 2005 (age 21) Bucharest
- Height: 1.89 m (6 ft 2 in)
- Plays: Right-handed
- Coach: Andrei Mlendea
- Prize money: $23,466

Singles
- Career record: 39–34
- Highest ranking: No. 788 (6 October 2025)
- Current ranking: No. 861 (22 September 2025)

Grand Slam singles results
- Australian Open Junior: Q2 (2023)
- French Open Junior: 1R (2023)
- Wimbledon Junior: 1R (2023)
- US Open Junior: 1R (2023)

Doubles
- Career record: 38–22
- Career titles: 5 ITF
- Highest ranking: No. 512 (3 March 2025)
- Current ranking: No. 898 (22 September 2025)

Grand Slam doubles results
- Australian Open Junior: 1R (2023)
- French Open Junior: QF (2023)
- Wimbledon Junior: 1R (2023)
- US Open Junior: W (2023)
- Last updated on: 22 September 2025.

Mara Gae (born 14 September 2005) is a Romanian tennis player.

Gae and her partner Anastasiia Gureva won the 2023 US Open Junior doubles title defeating Sara Saito and Nanaka Sato in the final.

== Personal life ==
Gae was given her first tennis racquet on her sixth birthday, a gift from family friend, tennis professional Ruxandra Dragomir.

== ITF Circuit finals ==
=== Singles: 3 (1 titles, 2 runner-ups) ===
Legend W15 tournaments (1–2)	Finals by surface Hard (0–1) Clay (1–1)

Result	W–L	Date	Tournament	Tier	Surface	Opponent	Score
Loss	0–1	Nov 2023	ITF Monastir, Tunisia	W15	Hard	Milana Zhabrailova	2–6, 2–6
Win	1–1	May 2025	ITF Bucharest, Romania	W15	Clay	(Romania) Eva Maria Ionescu	6–4, 7–5
Loss	1–2	Sep 2025	ITF Câmpulung, Romania	W15	Clay	(Romania) Anamaria Oana	4–6, 4–6

=== Doubles: 7 (5 titles, 2 runner-ups) ===
Legend W60/75 tournaments (0–1) W15 tournaments (5–1)	Finals by surface Hard (1–1) Clay (4–1)

Result	W–L	Date	Tournament	Tier	Surface	Partner	Opponents	Score
Win	1–0	Jun 2023	ITF Bucharest, Romania	W15	Clay	(Romania) Ștefania Bojică	(Romania) Ilinca Amariei (Czech Republic) Linda Ševčíková	6–3, 6–4
Win	2–0	Nov 2023	ITF Monastir, Tunisia	W15	Hard	(Netherlands) Rose Marie Nijkamp	(China) Yang Yidi (China) Yuan Chengyiyi	3–6, 6–3, [11–9]
Win	3–0	Jul 2024	ITF Galați, Romania	W15	Clay	(Romania) Lavinia Tănăsie	(Poland) Olivia Bergler (Ukraine) Mariya Poduraeva	6–2, 6–1
Win	4–0	Jul 2024	ITF Brașov, Romania	W15	Clay	(Romania) Ștefania Bojică	(Romania) Ilinca Amariei (Czech Republic) Linda Ševčíková	6–4, 6–0
Win	5–0	Aug 2024	ITF Bucharest, Romania	W15	Clay	(Romania) Ștefania Bojică	(Romania) Ilinca Amariei (Czech Republic) Linda Ševčíková	6–7^{(5)}, 6–3, [10–0]
Loss	5–1	Oct 2024	ITF Sharm El Sheikh, Egypt	W15	Hard	(Poland) Zuzanna Pawlikowska	(Germany) Mia Mack (Germany) Vivien Sandberg	4–6, 6–3, [10–12]
Loss	5–2	Sep 2025	ITF Bucharest, Romania	W75	Clay	(Netherlands) Arantxa Rus	(Romania) Oana Gavrilă (Greece) Sapfo Sakellaridi	4–6, 2–6

== Junior Grand Slam final ==
=== Doubles: 1 title ===
Result	Year	Tournament	Surface	Partner	Opponents	Score
Win	2023	US Open	Hard	Anastasiia Gureva	(Japan) Sara Saito (Japan) Nanaka Sato	1–6, 7–5, [10–8]
