= 2023 Australian Open – Girls' doubles =

Girls' doubles
- 2023 Australian Open

Final
- Champions: (Slovakia) Renáta Jamrichová (Italy) Federica Urgesi
- Runners-up: (Japan) Hayu Kinoshita (Japan) Sara Saito
- Score: 7–6^{(7–5)}, 1–6, [10–7]

Events
Singles	men	women		boys	girls
Doubles	men	women	mixed	boys	girls
WC Singles	men	women	quad
WC Doubles	men	women	quad
- Australian Open

Clervie Ngounoue and Diana Shnaider were the defending champions, but Ngounoue chose not to participate and Shnaider was no longer eligible to participate in junior events.

Renáta Jamrichová and Federica Urgesi won the title, defeating Hayu Kinoshita and Sara Saito in the final, 7–6^{(7–5)}, 1–6, [10–7].

== Seeds ==
1. (United Kingdom) Ella McDonald / (Hungary) Luca Udvardy (quarterfinals)
2. Mirra Andreeva / Alina Korneeva (semifinals)
3. (Slovakia) Nikola Daubnerová / (United Kingdom) Ranah Stoiber (second round)
4. (Japan) Hayu Kinoshita / (Japan) Sara Saito (final)
5. (Japan) Sayaka Ishii / (Japan) Ena Koike (semifinals)
6. (Argentina) Luciana Moyano / (Czech Republic) Amélie Šmejkalová (second round)
7. (United States) Ariana Anazagasty-Pursoo / (Japan) Mayu Crossley (first round)
8. (Slovakia) Irina Balus / (Slovakia) Nina Vargová (first round)

== Draw ==
Key

- Q = Qualifier
- WC = Wild card
- LL = Lucky loser
- Alt = Alternate
- ITF = ITF entry
- PR = Protected ranking
- SR = Special ranking
- SE = Special exempt
- JE = Junior exempt
- JR = Junior Accelerator Programme entrant
- CO = College Accelerator Programme entrant
- NG = Next Gen Accelerator Program entrant
- w/o = Walkover
- r = Retired
- d = Defaulted

=== Finals ===
Semifinals
(Slovakia) Renáta Jamrichová (Italy) Federica Urgesi	7^{7}	6
5	(Japan) Sayaka Ishii (Japan) Ena Koike	6^{5}	4
4	(Japan) Hayu Kinoshita (Japan) Sara Saito	6	7
2	Mirra Andreeva; Alina Korneeva	3	5

Final
(Slovakia) Renáta Jamrichová (Italy) Federica Urgesi	7^{7}	1	[10]
4	(Japan) Hayu Kinoshita (Japan) Sara Saito	6^{5}	6	[7]

=== Top half ===
First round
1	(United Kingdom) Ella McDonald (Hungary) Luca Udvardy	6	7
(United States) Tatum Evans (United States) Theadora Rabman	0	5
(Australia) Emerson Jones (Japan) Wakana Sonobe	4	7	[10]
(Bulgaria) Rositsa Dencheva (Bulgaria) Yoana Konstantinova	6	5	[7]
(United States) Ashton Bowers (Canada) Naomi Xu	2	1
WC	(Australia) Zara Larke (Australia) Anja Nayar	6	6
(Slovakia) Renáta Jamrichová (Italy) Federica Urgesi	6	3	[10]
8	(Slovakia) Irina Balus (Slovakia) Nina Vargová	3	6	[8]
3	(Slovakia) Nikola Daubnerová (United Kingdom) Ranah Stoiber	4	6	[12]
(Romania) Mara Gae (Australia) Lily Taylor	6	1	[10]
(Denmark) Rebecca Munk Mortensen; Kristiana Sidorova	6	6
(South Korea) Choi On-yu (Japan) Shiho Tsujioka	2	4
(Turkey) Melisa Ercan (Chinese Taipei) Madeleine Jessup	6	3	[8]
(United States) Anya Murthy (Poland) Malwina Rowińska	4	6	[10]
WC	(Australia) Gabby Gregg (Australia) Elicia Kim	2	0
5	(Japan) Sayaka Ishii (Japan) Ena Koike	6	6

Second round
1	(United Kingdom) E McDonald (Hungary) L Udvardy	7^{7}	6
(Australia) E Jones (Japan) W Sonobe	6^{3}	4
WC	(Australia) Z Larke (Australia) A Nayar	2	0
(Slovakia) R Jamrichová (Italy) F Urgesi	6	6
3	(Slovakia) N Daubnerová (United Kingdom) RA Stoiber	2	6	[7]
(Denmark) R Munk Mortensen; K Sidorova	6	3	[10]
(United States) A Murthy (Poland) M Rowińska	4	1
5	(Japan) S Ishii (Japan) E Koike	6	6

Quarterfinals
1	(United Kingdom) E McDonald (Hungary) L Udvardy	6^{7}	0
(Slovakia) R Jamrichová (Italy) F Urgesi	7^{9}	6
(Denmark) R Munk Mortensen; K Sidorova	4	6	[7]
5	(Japan) S Ishii (Japan) E Koike	6	4	[10]

Semifinals
(Slovakia) R Jamrichová (Italy) F Urgesi	7^{7}	6
5	(Japan) S Ishii (Japan) E Koike	6^{5}	4

=== Bottom half ===
First round
7	(United States) Ariana Anazagasty-Pursoo (Japan) Mayu Crossley	4	2
(Germany) Carolina Kuhl (Germany) Ella Seidel	6	6
WC	(Australia) Roisin Gilheany (Australia) Stefani Webb	6	1	[10]
(Italy) Lavinia Morreale (Bulgaria) Elizara Yaneva	4	6	[7]
(Morocco) Malak El Allami (Italy) Anna Paradisi	2	4
Anastasia Grechkina (Serbia) Darja Suvirđonkova	6	6
(United States) Ahmani Guichard (United States) Ava Krug	6	6^{3}	[6]
4	(Japan) Hayu Kinoshita (Japan) Sara Saito	1	7^{7}	[10]
6	(Argentina) Luciana Moyano (Czech Republic) Amélie Šmejkalová	6	4	[10]
(France) Yaroslava Bartashevich; Alevtina Ibragimova	4	6	[7]
(Poland) Weronika Ewald (New Zealand) Vivian Yang	7^{7}	3	[7]
(Romania) Cara Maria Meșter (Germany) Sonja Zhiyenbayeva	6^{2}	6	[10]
WC	(Australia) Lily Fairclough (Australia) Yilin Yan	5	6	[5]
(Slovenia) Ela Nala Milić (Italy) Francesca Pace	7	0	[10]
(Romania) Maria Daciana Ciubotaru (Canada) Ellie Daniels	0	4
2	Mirra Andreeva; Alina Korneeva	6	6

Second round
(Germany) C Kuhl (Germany) E Seidel	1	3
WC	(Australia) R Gilheany (Australia) S Webb	6	6
A Grechkina (Serbia) D Suvirđonkova	3	3
4	(Japan) H Kinoshita (Japan) S Saito	6	6
6	(Argentina) L Moyano (Czech Republic) A Šmejkalová	4	5
(Romania) CM Meșter (Germany) S Zhiyenbayeva	6	7
(Slovenia) EN Milić (Italy) F Pace	2	6^{3}
2	M Andreeva; A Korneeva	6	7^{7}

Quarterfinals
WC	(Australia) R Gilheany (Australia) S Webb	6	2	[8]
4	(Japan) H Kinoshita (Japan) S Saito	2	6	[10]
(Romania) CM Meșter (Germany) S Zhiyenbayeva	2	2
2	M Andreeva; A Korneeva	6	6

Semifinals
4	(Japan) H Kinoshita (Japan) S Saito	6	7
2	M Andreeva; A Korneeva	3	5
