= 2020 French Open – Wheelchair quad doubles =

Wheelchair quad doubles
- 2020 French Open

Final
- Champion: (Netherlands) Sam Schröder (United States) David Wagner
- Runner-up: (Australia) Dylan Alcott (United Kingdom) Andy Lapthorne
- Score: 4–6, 7–5, [10–8]

Events
Singles	men	women		boys	girls
Doubles	men	women	mixed	boys	girls
WC Singles	men	women	quad
WC Doubles	men	women	quad
Legends	−45	45+	women
- French Open

Defending champion David Wagner and his partner Sam Schröder defeated the other defending champion Dylan Alcott and his partner Andy Lapthorne in the final, 4–6, 7–5, [10–8] to win the quad doubles wheelchair tennis title at the 2020 French Open.

Alcott and Wagner and were the defending champions but did not participate together.

== Draw ==
Key

- Q = Qualifier
- WC = Wild card
- LL = Lucky loser
- Alt = Alternate
- ITF = ITF entry
- PR = Protected ranking
- SR = Special ranking
- SE = Special exempt
- JE = Junior exempt
- JR = Junior Accelerator Programme entrant
- CO = College Accelerator Programme entrant
- NG = Next Gen Accelerator Program entrant
- w/o = Walkover
- r = Retired
- d = Defaulted

=== Finals ===
Final
(Australia) Dylan Alcott (United Kingdom) Andy Lapthorne	6	5	[8]
(Netherlands) Sam Schröder (United States) David Wagner	4	7	[10]
