= 2020 French Open – Wheelchair women's doubles =

Tennis tournament - women's wheelchair doubles

Wheelchair women's doubles
- 2020 French Open

Final
- Champion: (Netherlands) Diede de Groot (Netherlands) Aniek van Koot
- Runner-up: (Japan) Yui Kamiji (United Kingdom) Jordanne Whiley
- Score: 7–6^{(7–2)}, 3–6, [10–8]

Events
Singles	men	women		boys	girls
Doubles	men	women	mixed	boys	girls
WC Singles	men	women	quad
WC Doubles	men	women	quad
Legends	−45	45+	women
- French Open

Two-time defending champions Diede de Groot and Aniek van Koot defeated Yui Kamiji and Jordanne Whiley in the final, 7–6^{(7–2)}, 3–6, [10–8] to win the women's doubles wheelchair tennis title at the 2020 French Open.

== Seeds ==
1. (Netherlands) Diede de Groot / (Netherlands) Aniek van Koot (champions)
2. (Japan) Yui Kamiji / (United Kingdom) Jordanne Whiley (final)

== Draw ==
Key

- Q = Qualifier
- WC = Wild card
- LL = Lucky loser
- Alt = Alternate
- ITF = ITF entry
- PR = Protected ranking
- SR = Special ranking
- SE = Special exempt
- JE = Junior exempt
- JR = Junior Accelerator Programme entrant
- CO = College Accelerator Programme entrant
- NG = Next Gen Accelerator Program entrant
- w/o = Walkover
- r = Retired
- d = Defaulted

=== Finals ===
Semifinals
1	(Netherlands) Diede de Groot (Netherlands) Aniek van Koot	6	6
(South Africa) Kgothatso Montjane (Japan) Momoko Ohtani	3	4
(Netherlands) Marjolein Buis (France) Charlotte Famin	0	1
2	(Japan) Yui Kamiji (United Kingdom) Jordanne Whiley	6	6

Final
1	(Netherlands) Diede de Groot (Netherlands) Aniek van Koot	7^{7}	3	[10]
2	(Japan) Yui Kamiji (United Kingdom) Jordanne Whiley	6^{2}	6	[8]
