= Vivian Yang =

New Zealand tennis player (born 2005)

- Country (sports): New Zealand
- Born: 11 January 2005 (age 21) Auckland, New Zealand
- Plays: Left-handed
- Prize money: $20,952

Singles
- Career record: 45–28
- Career titles: 1 ITF
- Highest ranking: No. 746 (17 July 2023)

Grand Slam singles results
- Australian Open Junior: 2R (2023)

Doubles
- Career record: 40–24
- Career titles: 3 ITF
- Highest ranking: No. 582 (17 July 2023)

Grand Slam doubles results
- Australian Open Junior: 1R (2023)

Team competitions
- Fed Cup: 4–3
- Last updated on: 29 July 2026.

Vivian Yang (born 11 January 2005) is an inactive New Zealand tennis player. She has won one singles title and three doubles titles on the ITF Circuit.

== Early life ==
Yang, born in Auckland, New Zealand, moved to China with her family. She began playing tennis at 4 years of age with her father, encouraging her to take up sport to help her immune system. As he was a keen amateur tennis player himself, Vivian played at the nearby courts too. After returning to New Zealand, Yang attended Westlake Girls High School, Auckland and joined the Tennis NZ’s high performance programme.

== Career ==
Yang made her senior debut for New Zealand in the 2022 Billie Jean King Cup playing in Pool A Asia/Oceania Zone Group I matches against China, South Korea and Indonesia in April, 2022. New Zealand captain Marina Erakovic championed her inclusion saying "Vivian is one of our best young players coming through. She has improved massively over the past two years and is gaining experience by the day with her recent playing schedule. Even though she is young, she is a huge asset to the team." After her debut defeat against Chinese No. 2, Yuan Yue, ranked at 143 in the world, which included four squandered set points in the first set, Erakovic remained positive saying "I was very impressed with Vivian. She played extremely well, and was able to actually really dictate on her own terms with that lefty serve and forehand, and she had a couple of set points but just got a little bit tight, that inexperience but yeah, just really positives out there for her." Yang secured her first senior win a few days later against Indonesia’s Beatrice Gumulya with a 7–5, 6–2 victory on 16 April 2022. By the end of 2022, Yang was New Zealand’s No. 1 under-18 singles and doubles player.

In July 2023, she was selected to compete for New Zealand in the 2023 Billie Jean King Cup.

In December 2024, she won the wildcard play-off to earn a spot in the main draw of the 2025 Auckland Open. Yang lost in the first round to lucky loser Jodie Burrage.

== ITF Circuit finals ==
=== Singles: 2 (1 title, 1 runner-up) ===
Legend W15 tournaments (1–1)	Finals by surface Hard (1–1)

Result	W–L	Date	Tournament	Tier	Surface	Opponent	Score
Loss	0–1	Oct 2022	ITF Sharm El Sheikh, Egypt	W15	Hard	Polina Iatcenko	1–6, 1–6
Win	1–1	Dec 2022	ITF Wellington, New Zealand	W15	Hard	(New Zealand) Jade Otway	6–3, 6–3

=== Doubles: 4 (3 titles, 1 runner-up) ===
Legend W15 tournaments (3–1)	Finals by surface Hard (3–1)

Result	W–L	Date	Tournament	Tier	Surface	Partner	Opponents	Score
Win	1–0	Jul 2022	ITF Caloundra, Australia	W15	Hard	(New Zealand) Monique Barry	(Japan) Aoi Ito (Japan) Nanari Katsumi	6–2, 7–6^{(5)}
Win	2–0	Oct 2022	ITF Sharm El Sheikh, Egypt	W15	Hard	(Lithuania) Patricija Paukštytė	(Slovakia) Romana Čisovská (Slovakia) Barbora Matúšová	7–5, 6–4
Loss	2–1	Jun 2023	ITF Nakhon, Thailand	W15	Hard	(Australia) Sara Nayar	(Thailand) Anchisa Chanta (Thailand) Patcharin Cheapchandej	1–6, 6–7^{(4)}
Win	3–1	Jun 2025	ITF Ma'anshan, China	W15	Hard (i)	(China) Huang Yujia	(China) Ni Ma Zhuoma (China) Wang Jiaqi	7–5, 1–6, [10–3]
