= Sam Schröder =

Dutch wheelchair tennis player

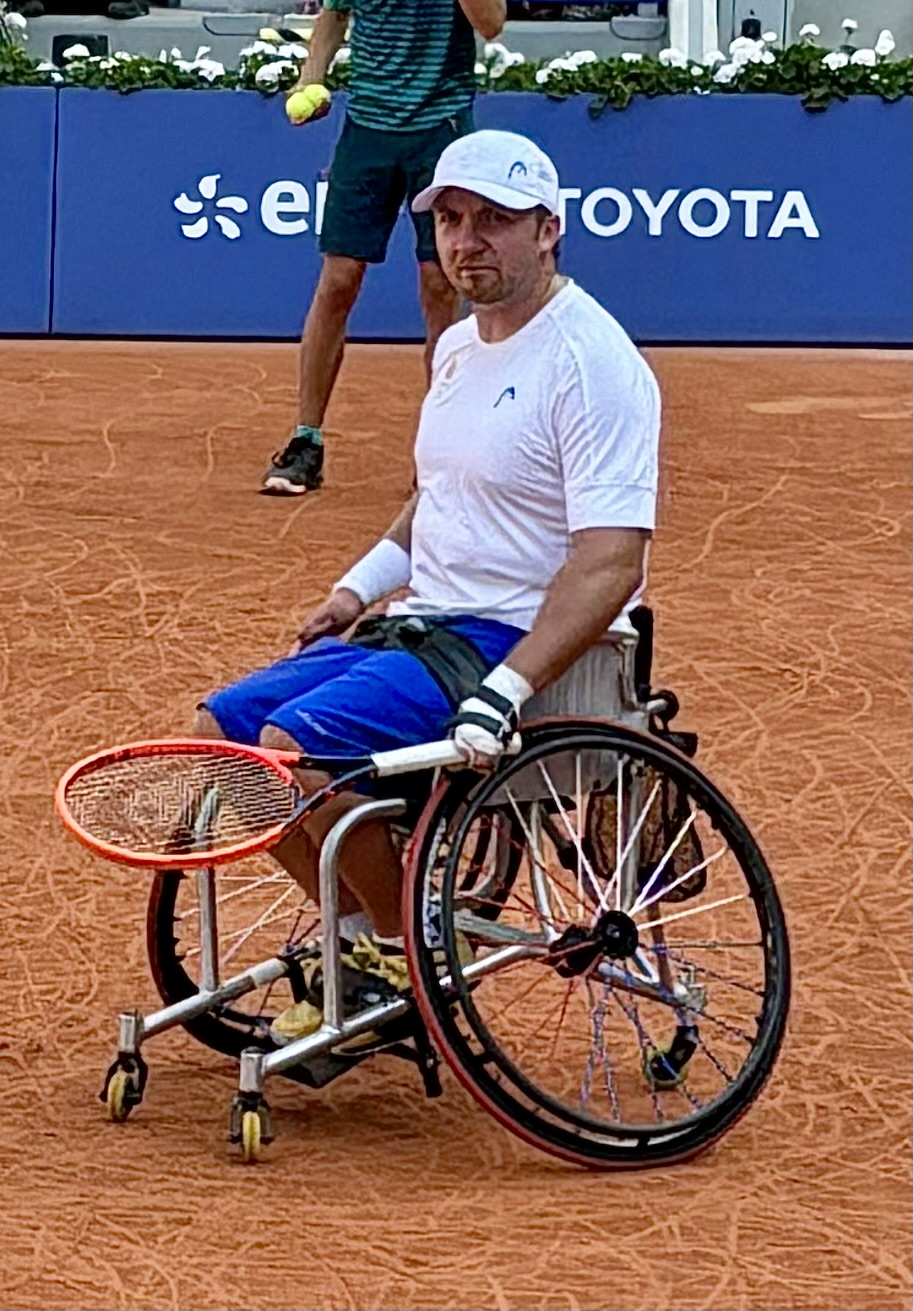
- Schröder during the 2024 Paris Summer Paralympics
- Country (sports): Netherlands
- Residence: Geleen, Netherlands
- Born: 25 September 1999 (age 27) Geleen, Netherlands
- Plays: Left-handed (one-handed backhand)

Singles
- Career record: 338–103
- Highest ranking: No. 1 (14 February 2022)
- Current ranking: No. 2 (31 October 2022)

Grand Slam singles results
- Australian Open: W (2022, 2023, 2024, 2025)
- French Open: F (2021, 2022, 2023, 2024)
- Wimbledon: W (2022)
- US Open: W (2020, 2023)

Other tournaments
- Masters: W (2022, 2025)
- Paralympic Games: F (2020, 2024)

Doubles
- Career record: 190–65
- Highest ranking: No. 1 (31 December 2021)
- Current ranking: No. 11 (1 June 2026)

Grand Slam doubles results
- Australian Open: W (2023, 2025)
- French Open: W (2020, 2022, 2024)
- Wimbledon: W (2022, 2023, 2024)
- US Open: W (2021, 2022, 2023, 2026)

Other doubles tournaments
- Masters Doubles: W (2021, 2022)
- Paralympic Games: W (2020, 2024)
Medal record
Men's wheelchair tennis
Representing Netherlands
Paralympic Games
Gold medal – first place	2020 Tokyo	Quad doubles
Gold medal – first place	2024 Paris	Quad doubles
Silver medal – second place	2020 Tokyo	Quad singles
Silver medal – second place	2024 Paris	Quad singles
European Championships
Silver medal – second place	2023 Rotterdam	Quad singles

Sam Schröder (born 25 September 1999) is a Dutch wheelchair tennis player. He has career-high Quad Wheelchair singles and Doubles rankings of #1.

== Personal life ==
Schröder has split hand/split foot syndrome (SHFM), a rare genetic disorder that caused his hands and feet to develop abnormally. He has only one finger on each hand, and is missing his entire midfoot. Between the ages of one and 16, he had 30 surgeries to improve his condition.

== Wheelchair tennis career ==
Schröder has a career-high Quad Wheelchair singles ranking of 1, achieved on 14 February 2022. He also has a career-high Quad Wheelchair doubles ranking of 1, achieved on 31 December 2021. Schröder won his first major title at the 2020 US Open, defeating Dylan Alcott in the final of the Quad Singles event.

== Career statistics ==
=== Performance timelines ===
Key
W	F	SF	QF	#R	RR	Q#	P#	DNQ	A	Z#	PO	G	S	B	NMS	NTI	P	NH

(W) winner; (F) finalist; (SF) semifinalist; (QF) quarterfinalist; (#R) rounds 4, 3, 2, 1; (RR) round-robin stage; (Q#) qualification round; (P#) preliminary round; (DNQ) did not qualify; (A) absent; (Z#) Davis/Fed Cup Zonal Group (with number indication) or (PO) play-off; (G) gold, (S) silver or (B) bronze Olympic/Paralympic medal; (NMS) not a Masters tournament; (NTI) not a Tier I tournament; (P) postponed; (NH) not held; (SR) strike rate (events won / competed); (W–L) win–loss record.
To avoid confusion and double counting, these charts are updated at the conclusion of a tournament or when the player's participation has ended.

Current through 2026 US Open – Wheelchair quad singles

==== Quad singles ====
Tournament	2020	2021	2022	2023	2024	2025	2026	SR	W–L
Australian Open	A	F	W	W	W	W	F	4 / 6	19–2
French Open	SF	F	F	F	F	SF	SF	0 / 7	10–7
Wimbledon	NH	F	W	SF	F	F	F	1 / 6	11–5
US Open	W	QF	F	W	NH	F	F	2 / 6	15–5
Win–loss	3–2	4–4	10–2	10–2	8–2	10–2	9–4	7 / 25	54–19

==== Quad doubles ====
Tournament	2020	2021	2022	2023	2024	2025	2026	SR	W–L
Australian Open	A	SF	F	W	SF (Note: Withdrew during the tournament. Not counted as a loss.)	W	QF	2 / 6	7–3
French Open	W	F	W	SF	W	SF	F	3 / 7	6–4
Wimbledon	NH	F	W	W	W	SF	F	3 / 6	7–3
US Open	F	W	W	W	NH	SF	W	4 / 6	11–2
Win–loss	1–1	2–3	7–1	7–1	5–0	4–3	5–3	12 / 23	31–12

=== Grand Slam tournament finals ===
==== Quad singles: 20 (7 titles, 13 runner-ups) ====
Result	Year	Tournament	Surface	Opponent	Score
Win	2020	US Open	Hard	(Australia) Dylan Alcott	7–6^{(7–5)}, 0–6, 6–4
Loss	2021	Australian Open	Hard	(Australia) Dylan Alcott	1–6, 0–6
Loss	2021	French Open	Clay	(Australia) Dylan Alcott	4–6, 2–6
Loss	2021	Wimbledon	Grass	(Australia) Dylan Alcott	2–6, 2–6
Win	2022	Australian Open	Hard	(Australia) Dylan Alcott	7–5, 6–0
Loss	2022	French Open	Clay	(Netherlands) Niels Vink	4–6, 6–7^{(8–10)}
Win	2022	Wimbledon	Grass	(Netherlands) Niels Vink	7–6^{(7–5)}, 6–1
Loss	2022	US Open	Hard	(Netherlands) Niels Vink	5–7, 3–6
Win	2023	Australian Open	Hard	(Netherlands) Niels Vink	6–2, 7–5
Loss	2023	French Open	Clay	(Netherlands) Niels Vink	6–3, 4–6, 4–6
Win	2023	US Open	Hard	(Netherlands) Niels Vink	6–3, 7–5
Win	2024	Australian Open	Hard	(Israel) Guy Sasson	6–3, 6–3
Loss	2024	French Open	Clay	(Israel) Guy Sasson	2–6, 6–3, 6–7^{(7–10)}
Loss	2024	Wimbledon	Grass	(Netherlands) Niels Vink	6–7^{(4–7)}, 4–6
Win	2025	Australian Open	Hard	(Netherlands) Niels Vink	7–6^{(9–7)}, 7–5
Loss	2025	Wimbledon	Grass	(Netherlands) Niels Vink	3–6, 3–6
Loss	2025	US Open	Hard	(Netherlands) Niels Vink	5–7, 3–6
Loss	2026	Australian Open	Hard	(Netherlands) Niels Vink	3–6, 6–7^{(5–7)}
Loss	2026	Wimbledon	Grass	(Netherlands) Niels Vink	1–6, 3–6
Loss	2026	US Open	Hard	(Netherlands) Niels Vink	2–6, 5–7

==== Quad doubles: 18 (13 titles, 5 runner-ups) ====
Result	Year	Tournament	Surface	Partner	Opponents	Score
Loss	2020	US Open	Hard	(United States) David Wagner	(Australia) Dylan Alcott (United Kingdom) Andy Lapthorne	6–3, 4–6, [8–10]
Win	2020	French Open	Clay	(United States) David Wagner	(Australia) Dylan Alcott (United Kingdom) Andy Lapthorne	4–6, 7–5, [10–8]
Loss	2021	French Open	Clay	(Australia) Dylan Alcott	(United Kingdom) Andy Lapthorne (United States) David Wagner	6–7^{(1–7)}, 6–4, [7–10]
Loss	2021	Wimbledon	Grass	(Australia) Dylan Alcott	(United Kingdom) Andy Lapthorne (United States) David Wagner	1–6, 6–3, 4–6
Win	2021	US Open	Hard	(Netherlands) Niels Vink	(Australia) Dylan Alcott (Australia) Heath Davidson	6–3, 6–2
Loss	2022	Australian Open	Hard	(Netherlands) Niels Vink	(United Kingdom) Andy Lapthorne (United States) David Wagner	6–2, 4–6, [7–10]
Win	2022	French Open	Clay	(Netherlands) Niels Vink	(Australia) Heath Davidson (Brazil) Ymanitu Silva	6–2, 6–2
Win	2022	Wimbledon	Grass	(Netherlands) Niels Vink	(United Kingdom) Andy Lapthorne (United States) David Wagner	6–7^{(4–7)}, 6–2, 6–3
Win	2022	US Open	Hard	(Netherlands) Niels Vink	(United States) David Wagner (Canada) Robert Shaw	6–1, 6–2
Win	2023	Australian Open	Hard	(Netherlands) Niels Vink	(South Africa) Donald Ramphadi (Brazil) Ymanitu Silva	6–1, 6–3
Win	2023	Wimbledon	Grass	(Netherlands) Niels Vink	(Australia) Heath Davidson (Canada) Robert Shaw	7–6^{(7–5)}, 6–0
Win	2023	US Open	Hard	(Netherlands) Niels Vink	(United Kingdom) Andy Lapthorne (South Africa) Donald Ramphadi	6–1, 6–2
Win	2024	French Open	Clay	(Netherlands) Niels Vink	(United Kingdom) Andy Lapthorne (Israel) Guy Sasson	7–6^{(11–9)}, 6–1
Win	2024	Wimbledon	Grass	(Netherlands) Niels Vink	(United Kingdom) Andy Lapthorne (Israel) Guy Sasson	3–6, 7–6^{(7–4)}, 6–3
Win	2025	Australian Open	Hard	(United Kingdom) Andy Lapthorne	(Israel) Guy Sasson (Netherlands) Niels Vink	6–1, 6–4
Loss	2026	French Open	Clay	(Australia) Jin Woodman	(Israel) Guy Sasson (Netherlands) Niels Vink	4–6, 3–6
Loss	2026	Wimbledon	Grass	(Australia) Jin Woodman	(Israel) Guy Sasson (Netherlands) Niels Vink	2–6, 1–6
Win	2026	US Open	Hard	(Australia) Jin Woodman	(Israel) Guy Sasson (Netherlands) Niels Vink	6–3, 2–6, [10–7]

== See also ==
- List of quad wheelchair tennis champions
