= 2023 Australian Open – Wheelchair quad singles =

Wheelchair quad singles
- 2023 Australian Open

Final
- Champion: (Netherlands) Sam Schröder
- Runner-up: (Netherlands) Niels Vink
- Score: 6–2, 7–5

Events
Singles	men	women		boys	girls
Doubles	men	women	mixed	boys	girls
WC Singles	men	women	quad	boys	girls
WC Doubles	men	women	quad	boys	girls
- Australian Open

Defending champion Sam Schröder defeated Niels Vink in the final, 6–2, 7–5 to win the quad singles wheelchair tennis title at the 2023 Australian Open.

== Seeds ==
1. (Netherlands) Niels Vink (final)
2. (Netherlands) Sam Schröder (champion)

== Draw ==
Key

- Q = Qualifier
- WC = Wild card
- LL = Lucky loser
- Alt = Alternate
- ITF = ITF entry
- PR = Protected ranking
- SR = Special ranking
- SE = Special exempt
- JE = Junior exempt
- JR = Junior Accelerator Programme entrant
- CO = College Accelerator Programme entrant
- NG = Next Gen Accelerator Program entrant
- w/o = Walkover
- r = Retired
- d = Defaulted

=== Finals ===
Quarterfinals
1	(Netherlands) Niels Vink	6	6
(Brazil) Ymanitu Silva	1	0
(South Africa) Donald Ramphadi	7^{9}	3	6
(Canada) Robert Shaw	6^{7}	6	1
(United Kingdom) Andy Lapthorne	3	3
(United States) David Wagner	6	6
(Australia) Heath Davidson	1	2
2	(Netherlands) Sam Schröder	6	6

Semifinals
1	(Netherlands) Niels Vink	6	6
(South Africa) Donald Ramphadi	3	0
(United States) David Wagner	0	3
2	(Netherlands) Sam Schröder	6	6

Final
1	(Netherlands) Niels Vink	2	5
2	(Netherlands) Sam Schröder	6	7
