= 2023 Australian Open – Girls' singles =

Girls' singles
- 2023 Australian Open

Final
- Champion: Alina Korneeva
- Runner-up: Mirra Andreeva
- Score: 6–7^{(2–7)}, 6–4, 7–5

Events
Singles	men	women		boys	girls
Doubles	men	women	mixed	boys	girls
WC Singles	men	women	quad
WC Doubles	men	women	quad
- Australian Open

Petra Marčinko was the defending champion, but decided to participate in the women's singles qualifying, where she lost to CoCo Vandeweghe in the second round.

Alina Korneeva won the title, defeating Mirra Andreeva in the final, 6–7^{(2–7)}, 6–4, 7–5.

== Seeds ==
1. (Japan) Sara Saito (first round)
2. (Czech Republic) Tereza Valentová (quarterfinals)
3. (United Kingdom) Ella McDonald (first round)
4. (Slovakia) Nikola Daubnerová (first round)
5. (Argentina) Luciana Moyano (first round)
6. (Japan) Mayu Crossley (first round)
7. Mirra Andreeva (final)
8. (Slovakia) Nina Vargová (third round)

9. Alina Korneeva (champion)
10. (Hungary) Luca Udvardy (first round)
11. (Japan) Ena Koike (third round)
12. (Japan) Sayaka Ishii (semifinals)
13. (United Kingdom) Ranah Stoiber (semifinals)
14. (France) Yaroslava Bartashevich (third round)
15. (Slovakia) Renáta Jamrichová (quarterfinals)
16. (Japan) Hayu Kinoshita (third round)

Click on the seed number of a player to go to their draw section.

== Draw ==
Key

- Q = Qualifier
- WC = Wild card
- LL = Lucky loser
- Alt = Alternate
- ITF = ITF entry
- PR = Protected ranking
- SR = Special ranking
- SE = Special exempt
- JE = Junior exempt
- JR = Junior Accelerator Programme entrant
- CO = College Accelerator Programme entrant
- NG = Next Gen Accelerator Program entrant
- w/o = Walkover
- r = Retired
- d = Defaulted

=== Finals ===
Quarterfinals
15	(Slovakia) Renáta Jamrichová	4	4
7	Mirra Andreeva	6	6
13	(United Kingdom) Ranah Stoiber	6	6
(Poland) Weronika Ewald	3	3
12	(Japan) Sayaka Ishii	7^{7}	6
Alevtina Ibragimova	6^{5}	4
9	Alina Korneeva	7	3	6
2	(Czech Republic) Tereza Valentová	5	6	0

Semifinals
7	Mirra Andreeva	6	6
13	(United Kingdom) Ranah Stoiber	3	2
12	(Japan) Sayaka Ishii	6	4	2
9	Alina Korneeva	2	6	6

Final
7	Mirra Andreeva	7^{7}	4	5
9	Alina Korneeva	6^{2}	6	7

=== Top half ===
==== Section 1 ====
First round
1	(Japan) Sara Saito	3	6	2
WC	(Australia) Stefani Webb	6	1	6
(Germany) Sonja Zhiyenbayeva	7	6
(Czech Republic) Amélie Šmejkalová	5	4
(United States) Anya Murthy	6	4	6
(Serbia) Darja Suvirđonkova	3	6	3
(Turkey) Melisa Ercan	3	2
15	(Slovakia) Renáta Jamrichová	6	6
10	(Hungary) Luca Udvardy	3	6^{5}
(Bulgaria) Rositsa Dencheva	6	7^{7}
(United States) Tatum Evans	6	6
(Australia) Lily Taylor	3	1
(Japan) Wakana Sonobe	6	6
(India) Shruti Ahlawat	3	1
(Morocco) Malak El Allami	2	1
7	Mirra Andreeva	6	6

Second round
WC	(Australia) S Webb	4	6	4
(Germany) S Zhiyenbayeva	6	4	6
(United States) A Murthy	3	0
15	(Slovakia) R Jamrichová	6	6
(Bulgaria) R Dencheva	6	6
(United States) T Evans	2	2
(Japan) W Sonobe	2	2
7	M Andreeva	6	6

Third round
(Germany) S Zhiyenbayeva	0	2
15	(Slovakia) R Jamrichová	6	6
(Bulgaria) R Dencheva	5	5
7	M Andreeva	7	7

Quarterfinals
15	(Slovakia) R Jamrichová	4	4
7	M Andreeva	6	6

==== Section 2 ====
First round
4	(Slovakia) Nikola Daubnerová	2	1
(Germany) Ella Seidel	6	6
WC	(Japan) Shiho Tsujioka	6^{5}	1
Q	(Italy) Lavinia Morreale	7^{7}	6
(Canada) Naomi Xu	3	6	3
WC	(Australia) Lily Fairclough	6	1	6
(Bulgaria) Yoana Konstantinova	6^{5}	0
13	(United Kingdom) Ranah Stoiber	7^{7}	6
11	(Japan) Ena Koike	6	6
Anastasia Grechkina	4	2
Q	(Romania) Maria Daciana Ciubotaru	7	6
WC	(Australia) Alana Subasic	5	1
(United States) Ava Krug	2	6	2
Q	(New Zealand) Vivian Yang	6	2	6
(Poland) Weronika Ewald	6	6
5	(Argentina) Luciana Moyano	1	4

Second round
(Germany) E Seidel	3	6	6
Q	(Italy) L Morreale	6	3	2
WC	(Australia) L Fairclough	1	0
13	(United Kingdom) RA Stoiber	6	6
11	(Japan) E Koike	6	6
Q	(Romania) MD Ciubotaru	2	4
Q	(New Zealand) V Yang	1	0
(Poland) W Ewald	6	6

Third round
(Germany) E Seidel	2	6	4
13	(United Kingdom) RA Stoiber	6	3	6
11	(Japan) E Koike	2	6	5
(Poland) W Ewald	6	1	7

Quarterfinals
13	(United Kingdom) RA Stoiber	6	6
(Poland) W Ewald	3	3

=== Bottom half ===
==== Section 3 ====
First round
8	(Slovakia) Nina Vargová	5	6	6
Kristiana Sidorova	7	4	3
(Chinese Taipei) Madeleine Jessup	6	3	6
(Romania) Cara Maria Meșter	4	6	1
(South Korea) Choi On-yu	2	6	7
WC	(Australia) Gabby Gregg	6	3	5
(United States) Ahmani Guichard	3	3
12	(Japan) Sayaka Ishii	6	6
14	(France) Yaroslava Bartashevich	6	6
(Ecuador) Tania Isabel Andrade Sabando	1	1
(United States) Ashton Bowers	5	6	5
WC	(Australia) Zara Larke	7	2	7
(Slovenia) Ela Nala Milić	1	4
(Italy) Federica Urgesi	6	6
Alevtina Ibragimova	6	6
3	(United Kingdom) Ella McDonald	1	2

Second round
8	(Slovakia) N Vargová	4	6	6
(Chinese Taipei) M Jessup	6	2	4
(South Korea) O-y Choi	0	1
12	(Japan) S Ishii	6	6
14	(France) Y Bartashevich	7^{13}	6
WC	(Australia) Z Larke	6^{11}	4
(Italy) F Urgesi	6	2	2
A Ibragimova	2	6	6

Third round
8	(Slovakia) N Vargová	3	1
12	(Japan) S Ishii	6	6
14	(France) Y Bartashevich	6^{3}	4
A Ibragimova	7^{7}	6

Quarterfinals
12	(Japan) S Ishii	7^{7}	6
A Ibragimova	6^{5}	4

==== Section 4 ====
First round
6	(Japan) Mayu Crossley	1	2
Q	(Denmark) Rebecca Munk Mortensen	6	6
(Poland) Malwina Rowińska	6	4	5
(United States) Theadora Rabman	2	6	7
Q	(Italy) Francesca Pace	4	3
(Germany) Carolina Kuhl	6	6
WC	(Australia) Anja Nayar	0	0
9	Alina Korneeva	6	6
16	(Japan) Hayu Kinoshita	6	4	6
(Slovakia) Irina Balus	4	6	3
LL	(Bulgaria) Elizara Yaneva	6	7
Q	(Canada) Ellie Daniels	1	5
WC	(Brazil) Carolina Xavier Laydner	1	7^{9}	3
(Australia) Emerson Jones	6	6^{7}	6
(United States) Ariana Anazagasty-Pursoo	6	4	5
2	(Czech Republic) Tereza Valentová	4	6	7

Second round
Q	(Denmark) RM Mortensen	6	6
(United States) T Rabman	3	1
(Germany) C Kuhl	1	3
9	A Korneeva	6	6
16	(Japan) H Kinoshita	6	7
LL	(Bulgaria) E Yaneva	1	5
(Australia) E Jones	6	3	1
2	(Czech Republic) T Valentová	4	6	6

Third round
Q	(Denmark) RM Mortensen	3	6^{4}
9	A Korneeva	6	7^{7}
16	(Japan) H Kinoshita	2	1
2	(Czech Republic) T Valentová	6	6

Quarterfinals
9	A Korneeva	7	3	6
2	(Czech Republic) T Valentová	5	6	0

== Qualifying ==
=== Seeds ===
1. (Romania) Mara Gae (qualifying competition)
2. (New Zealand) Vivian Yang (qualified)
3. (Bulgaria) Elizara Yaneva (qualifying competition, lucky loser)
4. (China) Zhao Yi-chen (qualifying competition)
5. (Italy) Francesca Pace (qualified)
6. (South Korea) Choi On-yu (qualified)
7. (South Korea) Kim Yu-jin (qualifying competition)
8. (Canada) Ellie Daniels (qualified)
9. (Italy) Anna Paradisi (first round)
10. (Denmark) Rebecca Munk Mortensen (qualified)
11. (Romania) Maria Daciana Ciubotaru (qualified)
12. (United Kingdom) Imogen Haddad (qualifying competition)
13. (Italy) Lavinia Morreale (qualified)
14. (Australia) Roisin Gilheany (qualifying competition)
15. (Norway) Emily Sartz-Lunde (first round)
16. (United States) Martina Marica (first round)

=== Qualifiers ===
1. Kristiana Sidorova
2. (New Zealand) Vivian Yang
3. (Italy) Lavinia Morreale
4. (Denmark) Rebecca Munk Mortensen
5. (Italy) Francesca Pace
6. (South Korea) Choi On-yu
7. (Romania) Maria Daciana Ciubotaru
8. (Canada) Ellie Daniels

=== Lucky loser ===
1. (Bulgaria) Elizara Yaneva

=== Draw ===
==== First qualifier ====
First round
1	(Romania) Mara Gae	6	1	6
(Australia) Isabella Crossman	3	6	2
Kristiana Sidorova	6	6
15	(Norway) Emily Sartz-Lunde	2	3

Qualifying competition
1	(Romania) Mara Gae	1	3
Kristiana Sidorova	6	6

==== Second qualifier ====
First round
2	(New Zealand) Vivian Yang	6	6
(Australia) Charlotte Vanstone McGrath	3	0
(Australia) Elicia Kim	6	6
9	(Italy) Anna Paradisi	4	0

Qualifying competition
2	(New Zealand) Vivian Yang	7	6
(Australia) Elicia Kim	5	2

==== Third qualifier ====
First round
3	(Bulgaria) Elizara Yaneva	6	6
(Australia) Gabrielle Villegas	0	1
(Australia) Kimiko Cooper	2	2
13	(Italy) Lavinia Morreale	6	6

Qualifying competition
3	(Bulgaria) Elizara Yaneva	0	6	1
13	(Italy) Lavinia Morreale	6	4	6

==== Fourth qualifier ====
First round
4	(China) Zhao Yi-chen	6	3	6
(Australia) Bridget Mihulka	3	6	2
(Australia) Sarah Rokusek	1	3
10	(Denmark) Rebecca Munk Mortensen	6	6

Qualifying competition
4	(China) Zhao Yi-chen	0	2
10	(Denmark) Rebecca Munk Mortensen	6	6

==== Fifth qualifier ====
First round
5	(Italy) Francesca Pace	3	6	6
(Australia) Yilin Yan	6	4	4
(United States) Taylor Goetz	6	3	5
14	(Australia) Roisin Gilheany	2	6	7

Qualifying competition
5	(Italy) Francesca Pace	6	6
14	(Australia) Roisin Gilheany	4	3

==== Sixth qualifier ====
First round
6	(South Korea) Choi On-yu	6	7
Ekaterina Ivanova	3	5
(Australia) Jelena Cvijanovic	6	6
16	(United States) Martina Marica	0	4

Qualifying competition
6	(South Korea) Choi On-yu	6	6
(Australia) Jelena Cvijanovic	3	1

==== Seventh qualifier ====
First round
7	(South Korea) Kim Yu-jin	6	6
(Japan) Kanna Soeda	2	1
WC	(Australia) Tahlia Kokkinis	1	2
11	(Romania) Maria Daciana Ciubotaru	6	6

Qualifying competition
7	(South Korea) Kim Yu-jin	4	2
11	(Romania) Maria Daciana Ciubotaru	6	6

==== Eighth qualifier ====
First round
8	(Canada) Ellie Daniels	6	3	6
(India) Aoka Nagasawa	3	6	4
(Australia) Rhea Makesar	2	6	3
12	(United Kingdom) Imogen Haddad	6	1	6

Qualifying competition
8	(Canada) Ellie Daniels	6	6
12	(United Kingdom) Imogen Haddad	4	0
