= 2023 Australian Open – Wheelchair women's singles =

Wheelchair women's singles
- 2023 Australian Open

Final
- Champion: (Netherlands) Diede de Groot
- Runner-up: (Japan) Yui Kamiji
- Score: 0–6, 6–2, 6–2

Details
- Draw: 16
- Seeds: 4

Events
Singles	men	women		boys	girls
Doubles	men	women	mixed	boys	girls
WC Singles	men	women	quad	boys	girls
WC Doubles	men	women	quad	boys	girls
- Australian Open

Two-time defending champion Diede de Groot defeated Yui Kamiji in the final, 0–6, 6–2, 6–2 to win the women's singles wheelchair tennis title at the 2023 Australian Open. It was her fifth Australian Open singles title and her 17th major singles title overall.

== Seeds ==
1. (Netherlands) Diede de Groot (champion)
2. (Japan) Yui Kamiji (final)
3. (Netherlands) Aniek van Koot (quarterfinals)
4. (Netherlands) Jiske Griffioen (semifinals)

== Draw ==
Key

- Q = Qualifier
- WC = Wild card
- LL = Lucky loser
- Alt = Alternate
- ITF = ITF entry
- PR = Protected ranking
- SR = Special ranking
- SE = Special exempt
- JE = Junior exempt
- JR = Junior Accelerator Programme entrant
- CO = College Accelerator Programme entrant
- NG = Next Gen Accelerator Program entrant
- w/o = Walkover
- r = Retired
- d = Defaulted

=== Finals ===
First round
1	(Netherlands) Diede de Groot	6	6
(South Africa) Kgothatso Montjane	1	1
(Japan) Saki Takamuro	2	1
(Japan) Momoko Ohtani	6	6
3	(Netherlands) Aniek van Koot	6	7
(Colombia) Angélica Bernal	1	5
(Japan) Manami Tanaka	7	6
(Chile) Macarena Cabrillana	5	1
(China) Zhu Zhenzhen	6	6
(Japan) Shiori Funamizu	3	2
(Germany) Katharina Krüger	1	0
4	(Netherlands) Jiske Griffioen	6	6
(Argentina) María Florencia Moreno	3	2
(United States) Dana Mathewson	6	6
(United Kingdom) Lucy Shuker	0	0
2	(Japan) Yui Kamiji	6	6

Quarterfinals
1	(Netherlands) Diede de Groot	6	6
(Japan) Momoko Ohtani	4	0
3	(Netherlands) Aniek van Koot	6	3	4
(Japan) Manami Tanaka	1	6	6
(China) Zhu Zhenzhen	4	6	4
4	(Netherlands) Jiske Griffioen	6	4	6
(United States) Dana Mathewson	0	2
2	(Japan) Yui Kamiji	6	6

Semifinals
1	(Netherlands) Diede de Groot	6	6
(Japan) Manami Tanaka	0	0
4	(Netherlands) Jiske Griffioen	2	1
2	(Japan) Yui Kamiji	6	6

Final
1	(Netherlands) Diede de Groot	0	6	6
2	(Japan) Yui Kamiji	6	2	2
