= Ymanitu Silva =

Brazilian Paralympic tennis player

- Full name: Ymanitu Geon da Silva
- Country (sports): Brazil
- Born: April 23, 1983 (age 43) Tijucas,Santa Catarina, Brazil

Grand Slam singles results
- Australian Open: QF (2023)
- French Open: SF (2019)
- Wimbledon: QF (2022)

Other tournaments
- Paralympic Games: QF (2016)

Grand Slam doubles results
- Australian Open: F (2023)
- French Open: F (2019, 2022)
- Wimbledon: SF (2022)
- US Open: SF (2023)

Other doubles tournaments
- Paralympic Games: 4th (2024)
Medal record
Parapan American Games
Silver medal – second place	2023 Santiago	Doubles

Ymanitu Geon da Silva (born 23 April 1983) is a Brazilian Paralympic wheelchair tennis player in the quad category. Ymanitu has won a number of international titles and represented Brazil in a number of major competitions, including the Paralympic Games and Grand Slams.

== Personal life ==
Ymanitu Geon da Silva was born in Tijucas, Santa Catarina, Brazil and, after suffering a spinal cord injury from a car accident, became one of the leading representatives of wheelchair tennis in the country. He is known by the nickname “Many” and has been recognized for his contributions to Paralympic sports.

== Career ==
=== Early career ===
Ymanitu began his journey in wheelchair tennis under the international quad classification, a category for players with impairments in three or more limbs. He stood out in regional and national competitions for his technique and determination.

==== International titles and Grand Slams ====
In 2018, Ymanitu was honored as the Best Tennis Player at the Paralympic Awards, recognizing his achievements on the international stage.

In 2019 he claimed the championship title in the Czech Republic and finished as the runner-up at the Toyota Open in France.

Ymanitu competed at Roland Garros in 2021, facing formidable challenges against the world's best wheelchair tennis players. At Wimbledon, he faced the world number one in his tournament debut.

Ymanitu participated at the 2019 Parapan American Games in Lima, Peru. He lost against David Wagner in the quarterfinal.

==== Paralympics ====
Ymanitu represented Brazil at the 2016 Summer Paralympics in Rio de Janeiro, marking his debut at the Paralympic Games. He entered the competition as Brazil's number one in wheelchair tennis. In his opening match, Silva defeated Frenchman Stéphane Houdet, a two-time Paralympic champion, in straight sets, establishing himself as one of the country's rising stars in the sport.

The Rio 2016 Paralympics also marked a milestone for Brazil in wheelchair tennis, as it was the first time the country fielded four players in the event, including Silva. This strong representation symbolized progress for the sport's development in Brazil and heightened expectations for the team's performance.

By the end of the Rio 2016 Paralympic Games, the Brazilian wheelchair tennis team, including Ymanitu, achieved its best campaign in the event's history.

Although Silva did not win a medal, his performance and that of his teammates represented a significant milestone for the sport's evolution in Brazil, serving as a springboard for future international competitions.

At the 2020 Summer Paralympics, Ymanitu once again represented Brazil, competing valiantly in his matches.

In 2024, Ymanitu was selected to compete at the Paris Paralympic Games. In the singles event, he faced Rob Shaw in the first round, and alongside Leandro Pena, he reached the doubles semifinals, ultimately falling short in the bronze medal match.

==== 2022 ====
At the 2022 Australian Open, Ymanitu Silva reached the doubles final, further establishing himself as one of the top players in his category.

==== 2023: Silver in Vendée, Doubles Final in Italy, and Parapan in Santiago ====
In 2023, Ymanitu Silva achieved another significant result by winning the silver medal at the Vendée Open for Paralympic tennis in France. This tournament demonstrated his continued competitiveness at the highest levels of the sport.

Later that year, Silva and Leandro Pena reached the doubles final in Italy, solidifying the Brazilian partnership on the international wheelchair tennis stage. The duo had an excellent campaign, overcoming tough matches to secure their spot in another major final.

At the Santiago 2023 Parapan American Games, Silva and Pena advanced to the doubles semifinals with a series of impressive victories. The duo's campaign culminated in a silver medal, narrowly missing out on gold.

In the singles category, Leandro Pena defeated Ymanitu Silva in the bronze medal match, concluding their participation in Santiago. Despite not securing a singles podium finish, the duo's overall performance was a testament to their strength as a team.

== Professional titles ==
ITF (Singles)

Singles Titles by Year
Year	Titles	Tournament	Type	Category	Surface
2023	1	Toyota Open International De 'ile De Re	ITF	ITF 2 Series	Hard
2022	2	s Versicherung Austrian Open 2022	ITF	ITF 2 Series	Carpet
2022	2	Fundación Emilio Sánchez Vicario	ITF	ITF 2 Series	Hard
2021	3	Sahin Kirbiyik Open	ITF	ITF 2 Series	Clay
2021	3	Kemal Sahin Open	ITF	ITF 2 Series	Clay
2021	3	Vilamoura Open	ITF	ITF Futures Series	Hard
2019	3	Prague Cup Czech Indoor	ITF	ITF 2 Series	Hard
2019	3	Brasil Wheelchair Tennis Open - New Venue	ITF	ITF 2 Series	Clay
2019	3	Czech Open	ITF	ITF 2 Series	Clay
2018	4	Brasil Wheelchair Tennis Open - New	ITF	ITF 2 Series	Hard
2018	4	Semana Guga Kuerten - New Dates	ITF	ITF 2 Series	Clay
2018	4	Be'er Sheba Open	ITF	ITF 3 Series	Hard
2018	4	Israel Open	ITF	ITF 2 Series	Hard
2017	3	Tennis Canada International Champs	ITF	ITF 2 Series	Hard
2017	3	Israel Open - New Dates	ITF	ITF 2 Series	Hard
2017	3	Open de Vendee	ITF	ITF 3 Series	Hard
2016	2	Semana Guga Kuerten	ITF	ITF 2 Series	Clay
2016	2	São Paulo Wheelchair Tennis Open	ITF	ITF Futures Series	Clay
2015	2	Semana Guga Kuerten	ITF	ITF 2 Series	Clay
2015	2	Copa Butija Wheelchair Tennis - New Dates	ITF	ITF Futures Series	Clay
2014	4	Colombia Open - New Dates	ITF	ITF 3 Series	Clay
2014	4	Copa Guga Kuerten	ITF	ITF 2 Series	Clay
2014	4	Copa Butija Wheelchair Tennis	ITF	ITF Futures Series	Clay
2014	4	South American Games	ITF	ITF Futures Series	Clay
2011	2	BH Open	ITF	ITF 3 Series	Clay
2011	2	Minas Open	ITF	ITF 3 Series	Clay

=== Awards ===
• Prêmio Paralímpico [Paralympic Award] as Best Wheelchair Tennis Player of the Year from the Brazilian Paralympic Committee: 2016, 2017, 2018, 2021, and 2022
