= 2023 Australian Open – Boys' singles =

Boys' singles
- 2023 Australian Open

Final
- Champion: (Belgium) Alexander Blockx
- Runner-up: (United States) Learner Tien
- Score: 6–1, 2–6, 7–6^{(11–9)}

Events
Singles	men	women		boys	girls
Doubles	men	women	mixed	boys	girls
WC Singles	men	women	quad	boys	girls
WC Doubles	men	women	quad	boys	girls
- Australian Open

Alexander Blockx won the boys' singles title at the 2023 Australian Open, defeating Learner Tien in the final, 6–1, 2–6, 7–6^{(11–9)}.

Bruno Kuzuhara was the defending champion, but was no longer eligible to participate in junior events. He received a wildcard into the men's singles qualifying competition, where he lost to Michael Mmoh in the first round.

== Seeds ==
1. (Switzerland) Kilian Feldbausch (quarterfinals)
2. (Bulgaria) Iliyan Radulov (quarterfinals)
3. (Belgium) Alexander Blockx (champion)
4. (France) Arthur Géa (quarterfinals)
5. (Romania) Mihai Alexandru Coman (second round)
6. (Japan) Rei Sakamoto (third round)
7. (Japan) Hayato Matsuoka (first round)
8. (United States) Cooper Williams (third round)
9. (Czech Republic) Maxim Mrva (second round)
10. (Brazil) João Fonseca (quarterfinals)
11. (China) Zhou Yi (semifinals)
12. (Australia) Hayden Jones (first round)
13. Danil Panarin (second round)
14. (Sweden) Kevin Edengren (first round)
15. (Bulgaria) Adriano Dzhenev (third round)
16. (Netherlands) Abel Forger (second round)

== Main draw ==
Key

- Q = Qualifier
- WC = Wild card
- LL = Lucky loser
- Alt = Alternate
- ITF = ITF entry
- PR = Protected ranking
- SR = Special ranking
- SE = Special exempt
- JE = Junior exempt
- JR = Junior Accelerator Programme entrant
- CO = College Accelerator Programme entrant
- NG = Next Gen Accelerator Program entrant
- w/o = Walkover
- r = Retired
- d = Defaulted

=== Finals ===
Quarterfinals
1	(Switzerland) Kilian Feldbausch	5	7	4
11	(China) Zhou Yi	7	5	6
3	(Belgium) Alexander Blockx	6^{7}	7^{7}	6
10	(Brazil) João Fonseca	7^{9}	6^{5}	3
(Poland) Tomasz Berkieta	3	6	7^{10}
4	(France) Arthur Géa	6	2	6^{8}
(United States) Learner Tien	6	6
2	(Bulgaria) Iliyan Radulov	0	0

Semifinals
11	(China) Zhou Yi	4	1
3	(Belgium) Alexander Blockx	6	6
(Poland) Tomasz Berkieta	4	2
(United States) Learner Tien	6	6

Final
3	(Belgium) Alexander Blockx	6	2	7^{11}
(United States) Learner Tien	1	6	6^{9}

=== Top half ===
==== Section 1 ====
First round
1	(Switzerland) Kilian Feldbausch	6	6
WC	(Australia) Thomas Nicholas Gadecki	1	3
(Croatia) Matej Dodig	6	7
Q	(Poland) Goran Zgoła	1	5
(United States) Kyle Kang	6	6
(Czech Republic) Jan Hrazdil	1	0
(Japan) Lennon Roark Jones	3	6	6^{8}
13	Danil Panarin	6	4	7^{10}
11	(China) Zhou Yi	6	6^{7}	6
Q	(Italy) Felipe Virgili Berini	1	7^{9}	2
WC	(Australia) Jeremy Zhang	3	3
(India) Manas Dhamne	6	6
(Sweden) Sebastian Eriksson	4	4
(South Korea) Roh Ho-young	6	6
(Canada) Keegan Rice	4	3
8	(United States) Cooper Williams	6	6

Second round
1	(Switzerland) K Feldbausch	6	6
(Croatia) M Dodig	2	1
(United States) K Kang	6	6
13	D Panarin	3	3
11	(China) Y Zhou	7	3	5
(India) M Dhamne	5	6	2^{r}
(South Korea) H-y Roh	4	3
8	(United States) C Williams	6	6

Third round
1	(Switzerland) K Feldbausch	6	6^{1}	6
(United States) K Kang	4	7^{7}	4
11	(China) Y Zhou	6	6
8	(United States) C Williams	1	4

Quarterfinals
1	(Switzerland) K Feldbausch	5	7	4
11	(China) Y Zhou	7	5	6

==== Section 2 ====
First round
3	(Belgium) Alexander Blockx	6	6
(Italy) Federico Bondioli	0	3
(Slovenia) Matic Križnik	6^{5}	5
(Turkey) Atakan Karahan	7^{7}	7
(Serbia) Zoran Ludoški	7	7
WC	(Australia) Zachary Viiala	5	5
(United States) Kaylan Bigun	3	6	6^{7}
15	(Bulgaria) Adriano Dzhenev	6	2	7^{10}
10	(Brazil) João Fonseca	6	6
(India) Aryan Shah	1	2
WC	(Australia) Hugh Winter	0	2
(Czech Republic) Vít Kalina	6	6
(Ukraine) Volodymyr Iakubenko	7^{7}	6^{3}	4
(France) Tiago Pires	6^{5}	7^{7}	6
(Germany) David Fix	3	3
6	(Japan) Rei Sakamoto	6	6

Second round
3	(Belgium) A Blockx	6	6
(Turkey) A Karahan	4	4
(Serbia) Z Ludoški	5	6^{6}
15	(Bulgaria) A Dzhenev	7	7^{8}
10	(Brazil) J Fonseca	7	6
(Czech Republic) V Kalina	5	3
(France) T Pires	6	6^{4}	4
6	(Japan) R Sakamoto	4	7^{7}	6

Third round
3	(Belgium) A Blockx	6	6
15	(Bulgaria) A Dzhenev	2	2
10	(Brazil) J Fonseca	6	6
6	(Japan) R Sakamoto	3	4

Quarterfinals
3	(Belgium) A Blockx	6^{7}	7^{7}	6
10	(Brazil) J Fonseca	7^{9}	6^{5}	3

=== Bottom half ===
==== Section 3 ====
First round
5	(Romania) Mihai Alexandru Coman	7^{8}	3	6
Q	(Italy) Lorenzo Carboni	6^{6}	6	4
(Australia) Charlie Camus	4	4
(Poland) Tomasz Berkieta	6	6
Q	Ruslan Tiukaev	6	6
Q	(Japan) Reiya Hattori	4	3
WC	(Brazil) Nicolas Oliveira	6	1	1
9	(Czech Republic) Maxim Mrva	3	6	6
14	(Sweden) Kevin Edengren	4	3
(Switzerland) Patrick Schön	6	6
WC	(Australia) Pavle Marinkov	6	7
(Austria) Joel Schwärzler	4	5
(India) Yuvan Nandal	2	6	5
(United States) Alexander Frusina	6	3	3^{r}
Q	(Australia) Brendan Loh	1	2
4	(France) Arthur Géa	6	6

Second round
5	(Romania) MA Coman	6^{4}	1
(Poland) T Berkieta	7^{7}	6
Q	R Tiukaev	6	6
9	(Czech Republic) M Mrva	3	4
(Switzerland) P Schön	3	6	3
WC	(Australia) P Marinkov	6	1	6
(India) Y Nandal	6	1	2
4	(France) A Géa	3	6	6

Third round
(Poland) T Berkieta	7^{7}	6
Q	R Tiukaev	6^{3}	4
WC	(Australia) P Marinkov	6	3	2
4	(France) A Géa	4	6	6

Quarterfinals
(Poland) T Berkieta	3	6	7^{10}
4	(France) A Géa	6	2	6^{8}

==== Section 4 ====
First round
7	(Japan) Hayato Matsuoka	0	3
(United States) Learner Tien	6	6
(Serbia) Branko Djuric	5	2
(Italy) Federico Cinà	7	6
(South Korea) Chang Woo-hyuk	0	2
(Czech Republic) Jakub Filip	6	6
Q	(Ukraine) Andrii Zimnokh	6	6^{5}	7
12	(Australia) Hayden Jones	1	7^{7}	5
16	(Netherlands) Abel Forger	2	6	7^{10}
(United States) Meecah Bigun	6	1	6^{8}
(Estonia) Oliver Ojakäär	7^{7}	6
WC	(Australia) Marcus Schoeman	6^{5}	4
Q	(China) Zhang Tianhui	2	6	6
(Belgium) Emilien Demanet	6	3	4
WC	(Japan) Yuta Tomida	6	4	2
2	(Bulgaria) Iliyan Radulov	4	6	6

Second round
(United States) L Tien	2	6	6
(Italy) F Cinà	6	2	4
(Czech Republic) J Filip	6	6
Q	(Ukraine) A Zimnokh	3	3
16	(Netherlands) A Forger	4	2
(Estonia) O Ojakäär	6	6
Q	(China) T Zhang	4	6^{2}
2	(Bulgaria) I Radulov	6	7^{7}

Third round
(United States) L Tien	6	6
(Czech Republic) J Filip	0	2
(Estonia) O Ojakäär	5	3
2	(Bulgaria) I Radulov	7	6

Quarterfinals
(United States) L Tien	6	6
2	(Bulgaria) I Radulov	0	0

== Qualifying ==
=== Seeds ===
1. (United States) Adhithya Ganesan (qualifying competition)
2. (New Zealand) Diego Quispe-Kim (first round)
3. (Argentina) Segundo Goity Zapico (qualifying competition)
4. (Canada) Liam Drover-Mattinen (qualifying competition)
5. (Japan) Reiya Hattori (qualified)
6. (Slovakia) Michal Krajčí (qualifying competition)
7. (Poland) Goran Zgoła (qualified)
8. (France) Jules Leroux (qualifying competition)
9. (South Korea) Park Seung-min (qualifying competition)
10. (Italy) Lorenzo Carboni (qualified)
11. (China) Zhang Tianhui (qualified)
12. (Italy) Felipe Virgili Berini (qualified)
13. (Ukraine) Andrii Zimnokh (qualified)
14. Ruslan Tiukaev (qualified)
15. (United States) Aayush P Bhat (qualifying competition)
16. (India) Kriish Tyagi (qualifying competition)

=== Qualifiers ===
1. (Ukraine) Andrii Zimnokh
2. (Australia) Brendan Loh
3. (Italy) Felipe Virgili Berini
4. (China) Zhang Tianhui
5. (Japan) Reiya Hattori
6. Ruslan Tiukaev
7. (Poland) Goran Zgoła
8. (Italy) Lorenzo Carboni

=== Draw ===
==== First qualifier ====
First round
1	(United States) Adhithya Ganesan	6	3	6
WC	(Australia) Cruz Hewitt	1	6	2
(Australia) Rohan Hazratwala	1	3
13	(Ukraine) Andrii Zimnokh	6	6

Qualifying competition
1	(United States) Adhithya Ganesan	1	7^{7}	4
13	(Ukraine) Andrii Zimnokh	6	6^{4}	6

==== Second qualifier ====
First round
2	(New Zealand) Diego Quispe-Kim	5	6	4
(Australia) Brendan Loh	7	3	6
WC	(Japan) Shu Muto	4	2
16	(India) Kriish Tyagi	6	6

Qualifying competition
(Australia) Brendan Loh	6	6
16	(India) Kriish Tyagi	4	4

==== Third qualifier ====
First round
3	(Argentina) Segundo Goity Zapico	7^{7}	4	6
(Australia) Jake Dembo	6^{4}	6	1
(Japan) Takamasa Mishiro	1	2
12	(Italy) Felipe Virgili Berini	6	6

Qualifying competition
3	(Argentina) Segundo Goity Zapico	2	6	6^{1}
12	(Italy) Felipe Virgili Berini	6	3	7^{7}

==== Fourth qualifier ====
First round
4	(Canada) Liam Drover-Mattinen	6	6
(Australia) Lachlan McFadzean	3	0
(Japan) Shingo Masuda	2	0
11	(China) Zhang Tianhui	6	6

Qualifying competition
4	(Canada) Liam Drover-Mattinen	4	4
11	(China) Zhang Tianhui	6	6

==== Fifth qualifier ====
First round
5	(Japan) Reiya Hattori	7^{7}	6
(Australia) Alexander Despoja	6^{5}	4
(Latvia) Gustavs Dambiņš	2	4
9	(South Korea) Park Seung-min	6	6

Qualifying competition
5	(Japan) Reiya Hattori	6	1	6
9	(South Korea) Park Seung-min	3	6	3

==== Sixth qualifier ====
First round
6	(Slovakia) Michal Krajčí	6	6
(Hong Kong) Kwok Shun Dasson Chan	0	1
(Australia) Henry Lamchinniah	3	2
14	Ruslan Tiukaev	6	6

Qualifying competition
6	(Slovakia) Michal Krajčí	4	1
14	Ruslan Tiukaev	6	6

==== Seventh qualifier ====
First round
7	(Poland) Goran Zgoła	6	7
(Australia) Cooper Errey	0	5
(Italy) Iannis Miletich	3	6	4
15	(United States) Aayush P Bhat	6	1	6

Qualifying competition
7	(Poland) Goran Zgoła	1	7	6
15	(United States) Aayush P Bhat	6	5	3

==== Eighth qualifier ====
First round
8	(France) Jules Leroux	7	6
(India) Daksh Prasad	5	3
WC	(Australia) Cristian Care	4	3
10	(Italy) Lorenzo Carboni	6	6

Qualifying competition
8	(France) Jules Leroux	6	2	4
10	(Italy) Lorenzo Carboni	1	6	6
