= 2023 Australian Open – Wheelchair men's doubles =

Wheelchair men's doubles
- 2023 Australian Open

Final
- Champions: (United Kingdom) Alfie Hewett (United Kingdom) Gordon Reid
- Runners-up: (Netherlands) Maikel Scheffers (Netherlands) Ruben Spaargaren
- Score: 6–1, 6–2

Events
Singles	men	women		boys	girls
Doubles	men	women	mixed	boys	girls
WC Singles	men	women	quad	boys	girls
WC Doubles	men	women	quad	boys	girls
- Australian Open

Three-time defending champions Alfie Hewett and Gordon Reid defeated Maikel Scheffers and Ruben Spaargaren in the final, 6–1, 6–2 to win the men's doubles wheelchair tennis title at the 2023 Australian Open.

== Seeds ==
1. (Spain) Martín de la Puente / (Argentina) Gustavo Fernández (quarterfinals)
2. (United Kingdom) Alfie Hewett / (United Kingdom) Gordon Reid (champions)

== Draw ==
Key

- Q = Qualifier
- WC = Wild card
- LL = Lucky loser
- Alt = Alternate
- ITF = ITF entry
- PR = Protected ranking
- SR = Special ranking
- SE = Special exempt
- JE = Junior exempt
- JR = Junior Accelerator Programme entrant
- CO = College Accelerator Programme entrant
- NG = Next Gen Accelerator Program entrant
- w/o = Walkover
- r = Retired
- d = Defaulted

=== Finals ===
Quarterfinals
1	(Spain) Martín de la Puente (Argentina) Gustavo Fernández	5	5
(Netherlands) Maikel Scheffers (Netherlands) Ruben Spaargaren	7	7
(United States) Casey Ratzlaff (Australia) Ben Weekes	2	2
(Chile) Alexander Cataldo (Netherlands) Tom Egberink	6	6
(Japan) Daisuke Arai (Japan) Takashi Sanada	6^{6}	7	[10]
(United Kingdom) Ben Bartram (Japan) Tokito Oda	7^{8}	5	[5]
(Belgium) Joachim Gérard (Japan) Takuya Miki	0	3
2	(United Kingdom) Alfie Hewett (United Kingdom) Gordon Reid	6	6

Semifinals
(Netherlands) Maikel Scheffers (Netherlands) Ruben Spaargaren	6	6
(Chile) Alexander Cataldo (Netherlands) Tom Egberink	3	2
(Japan) Daisuke Arai (Japan) Takashi Sanada	4	4
2	(United Kingdom) Alfie Hewett (United Kingdom) Gordon Reid	6	6

Final
(Netherlands) Maikel Scheffers (Netherlands) Ruben Spaargaren	1	2
2	(United Kingdom) Alfie Hewett (United Kingdom) Gordon Reid	6	6
