= 2023 Australian Open – Boys' doubles =

Boys' doubles
- 2023 Australian Open

Final
- Champions: (United States) Learner Tien (United States) Cooper Williams
- Runners-up: (Belgium) Alexander Blockx (Brazil) João Fonseca
- Score: 6–4, 6–4

Events
Singles	men	women		boys	girls
Doubles	men	women	mixed	boys	girls
WC Singles	men	women	quad	boys	girls
WC Doubles	men	women	quad	boys	girls
- Australian Open

Bruno Kuzuhara and Coleman Wong were the defending champions, but both players were no longer eligible to participate in junior events.

Learner Tien and Cooper Williams won the title, defeating Alexander Blockx and João Fonseca in the final, 6–4, 6–4.

== Seeds ==
1. (Belgium) Alexander Blockx / (Brazil) João Fonseca (final)
2. (Bulgaria) Adriano Dzhenev / (Bulgaria) Iliyan Radulov (first round)
3. (Switzerland) Kilian Feldbausch / (United States) Kyle Kang (first round)
4. (Romania) Mihai Alexandru Coman / (Croatia) Matej Dodig (first round)
5. (Australia) Hayden Jones / Danil Panarin (second round)
6. (Netherlands) Abel Forger / (China) Zhou Yi (first round)
7. (United States) Learner Tien / (United States) Cooper Williams (champions)
8. (Japan) Lennon Roark Jones / (Japan) Hayato Matsuoka (first round)

== Draw ==
Key

- Q = Qualifier
- WC = Wild card
- LL = Lucky loser
- Alt = Alternate
- ITF = ITF entry
- PR = Protected ranking
- SR = Special ranking
- SE = Special exempt
- JE = Junior exempt
- JR = Junior Accelerator Programme entrant
- CO = College Accelerator Programme entrant
- NG = Next Gen Accelerator Program entrant
- w/o = Walkover
- r = Retired
- d = Defaulted

=== Finals ===
Semifinals
1	(Belgium) Alexander Blockx (Brazil) João Fonseca	7	7^{7}
WC	(Australia) Cooper Errey (Australia) Marcus Schoeman	5	6^{1}
7	(United States) Learner Tien (United States) Cooper Williams	6	6
(Italy) Federico Bondioli (Slovenia) Matic Križnik	3	3

Final
1	(Belgium) Alexander Blockx (Brazil) João Fonseca	4	4
7	(United States) Learner Tien (United States) Cooper Williams	6	6

=== Top half ===
First round
1	(Belgium) Alexander Blockx (Brazil) João Fonseca	6	6
(United States) Kaylan Bigun (United States) Meecah Bigun	3	0
WC	(Australia) Thomas Nicholas Gadecki (Australia) Hugh Winter	6	1	[6]
(Canada) Keegan Rice (South Korea) Roh Ho-young	4	6	[10]
(Italy) Lorenzo Carboni (Italy) Felipe Virgili Berini	7^{7}	4	[7]
(Poland) Tomasz Berkieta (Austria) Joel Schwärzler	6^{5}	6	[10]
(Ukraine) Volodymyr Iakubenko (Estonia) Oliver Ojakäär	6	6
6	(Netherlands) Abel Forger (China) Zhou Yi	3	3
4	(Romania) Mihai Alexandru Coman (Croatia) Matej Dodig	6	4	[8]
WC	(Australia) Cooper Errey (Australia) Marcus Schoeman	3	6	[10]
(Slovakia) Michal Krajčí (Ukraine) Andrii Zimnokh	6	6
(Sweden) Sebastian Eriksson (Switzerland) Patrick Schön	4	2
(France) Jules Leroux (France) Tiago Pires	1	2
(Italy) Federico Cinà (Sweden) Kevin Edengren	6	6
(Germany) David Fix (Czech Republic) Vít Kalina	7	6
8	(Japan) Lennon Roark Jones (Japan) Hayato Matsuoka	5	3

Second round
1	(Belgium) A Blockx (Brazil) J Fonseca	6	4	[10]
(Canada) K Rice (South Korea) H-y Roh	3	6	[3]
(Poland) T Berkieta (Austria) J Schwärzler	5	7^{7}	[2]
(Ukraine) V Iakubenko (Estonia) O Ojakäär	7	6^{4}	[10]
WC	(Australia) C Errey (Australia) M Schoeman	7^{9}	6
(Slovakia) M Krajči (Ukraine) A Zimnokh	6^{7}	4
(Italy) F Cinà (Sweden) K Edengren	6^{6}	7	[10]
(Germany) D Fix (Czech Republic) V Kalina	7^{8}	5	[5]

Quarterfinals
1	(Belgium) A Blockx (Brazil) J Fonseca	4	6	[10]
(Ukraine) V Iakubenko (Estonia) O Ojakäär	6	1	[4]
WC	(Australia) C Errey (Australia) M Schoeman	6	7
(Italy) F Cinà (Sweden) K Edengren	2	5

Semifinals
1	(Belgium) A Blockx (Brazil) J Fonseca	7	7^{7}
WC	(Australia) C Errey (Australia) M Schoeman	5	6^{1}

=== Bottom half ===
First round
7	(United States) Learner Tien (United States) Cooper Williams	6	6
(Serbia) Branko Djuric (Serbia) Zoran Ludoški	2	4
(Turkey) Atakan Karahan (Japan) Rei Sakamoto	7	6
(India) Yuvan Nandal (Poland) Goran Zgoła	5	1
WC	(Australia) Pavle Marinkov (Australia) Zachary Viiala	6	3	[10]
(Czech Republic) Jakub Filip (Czech Republic) Maxim Mrva	1	6	[8]
Ruslan Tiukaev (China) Zhang Tianhui	3	6	[10]
3	(Switzerland) Kilian Feldbausch (United States) Kyle Kang	6	3	[6]
5	(Australia) Hayden Jones; Danil Panarin	6	6
Alt	(Australia) Brendan Loh (Japan) Yuta Tomida	2	2
(United States) Alexander Frusina (Czech Republic) Jan Hrazdil	2	7^{7}	[10]
(South Korea) Chang Woo-hyuk (Japan) Reiya Hattori	6	6^{3}	[4]
(Italy) Federico Bondioli (Slovenia) Matic Križnik	6	6
(Australia) Charlie Camus (Belgium) Emilien Demanet	4	3
WC	(Australia) Alexander Despoja (Australia) Jeremy Zhang	4	6	[10]
2	(Bulgaria) Adriano Dzhenev (Bulgaria) Iliyan Radulov	6	3	[6]

Second round
7	(United States) L Tien (United States) C Williams	6^{4}	6	[10]
(Turkey) A Karahan (Japan) R Sakamoto	7^{7}	4	[7]
WC	(Australia) P Marinkov (Australia) Z Viiala	5	6^{5}
R Tiukaev (China) T Zhang	7	7^{7}
5	(Australia) H Jones; D Panarin	6	4	[6]
(United States) A Frusina (Czech Republic) J Hrazdil	4	6	[10]
(Italy) F Bondioli (Slovenia) M Križnik	4	6	[10]
WC	(Australia) A Despoja (Australia) J Zhang	6	2	[7]

Quarterfinals
7	(United States) L Tien (United States) C Williams	3	6	[10]
R Tiukaev (China) T Zhang	6	1	[8]
(United States) A Frusina (Czech Republic) J Hrazdil	6^{10}	7	[7]
(Italy) F Bondioli (Slovenia) M Križnik	7^{12}	5	[10]

Semifinals
7	(United States) L Tien (United States) C Williams	6	6
(Italy) F Bondioli (Slovenia) M Križnik	3	3
