= 2023 Australian Open – Wheelchair quad doubles =

Wheelchair quad doubles
- 2023 Australian Open

Final
- Champion: (Netherlands) Sam Schröder (Netherlands) Niels Vink
- Runner-up: (South Africa) Donald Ramphadi (Brazil) Ymanitu Silva
- Score: 6–1, 6–3

Events
Singles	men	women		boys	girls
Doubles	men	women	mixed	boys	girls
WC Singles	men	women	quad	boys	girls
WC Doubles	men	women	quad	boys	girls
- Australian Open

Sam Schröder and Niels Vink defeated Donald Ramphadi and Ymanitu Silva in the final, 6–1, 6–3 to win the quad doubles wheelchair tennis title at the 2023 Australian Open. With the win, Schröder and Vink completed both a non-calendar-year Grand Slam and the career Super Slam in wheelchair quad doubles.

Andy Lapthorne and David Wagner were the defending champions, but lost in the semifinals to Ramphadi and Silva.

== Seeds ==
1. (Netherlands) Sam Schröder / (Netherlands) Niels Vink (champions)
2. (United Kingdom) Andy Lapthorne / (United States) David Wagner (semifinals)

== Draw ==
Key

- Q = Qualifier
- WC = Wild card
- LL = Lucky loser
- Alt = Alternate
- ITF = ITF entry
- PR = Protected ranking
- SR = Special ranking
- SE = Special exempt
- JE = Junior exempt
- JR = Junior Accelerator Programme entrant
- CO = College Accelerator Programme entrant
- NG = Next Gen Accelerator Program entrant
- w/o = Walkover
- r = Retired
- d = Defaulted

=== Bracket ===
Semifinals
1	(Netherlands) Sam Schröder (Netherlands) Niels Vink	6	6
(Australia) Heath Davidson (Canada) Robert Shaw	0	1
(South Africa) Donald Ramphadi (Brazil) Ymanitu Silva	7	6
2	(United Kingdom) Andy Lapthorne (United States) David Wagner	5	3

Final
1	(Netherlands) Sam Schröder (Netherlands) Niels Vink	6	6
(South Africa) Donald Ramphadi (Brazil) Ymanitu Silva	1	3
