= 2023 Australian Open – Wheelchair men's singles =

Wheelchair men's singles
- 2023 Australian Open

Final
- Champion: (United Kingdom) Alfie Hewett
- Runner-up: (Japan) Tokito Oda
- Score: 6–3, 6–1

Details
- Draw: 16
- Seeds: 4

Events
| Singles | men | women | | boys | girls |
| Doubles | men | women | mixed | boys | girls |
| WC Singles | men | women | quad | boys | girls |
| WC Doubles | men | women | quad | boys | girls |
- Australian Open

Alfie Hewett defeated Tokito Oda in the final, 6–3, 6–1 to win the men's singles wheelchair tennis title at the 2023 Australian Open. It was his first Australian Open singles title and his seventh major singles title overall.

Shingo Kunieda was the reigning champion, but he retired from professional wheelchair tennis before the tournament.

== Seeds ==
1. (United Kingdom) Alfie Hewett (champion)
2. (Argentina) Gustavo Fernández (semifinals)
3. (Japan) Tokito Oda (final)
4. (Belgium) Joachim Gérard (first round)

== Draw ==
Key

- Q = Qualifier
- WC = Wild card
- LL = Lucky loser
- Alt = Alternate
- ITF = ITF entry
- PR = Protected ranking
- SR = Special ranking
- SE = Special exempt
- JE = Junior exempt
- JR = Junior Accelerator Programme entrant
- CO = College Accelerator Programme entrant
- NG = Next Gen Accelerator Program entrant
- w/o = Walkover
- r = Retired
- d = Defaulted

=== Finals ===
First round
1 | (United Kingdom) Alfie Hewett | 6 | 6
(Japan) Daisuke Arai | 1 | 0
(United Kingdom) Gordon Reid | 6 | 3 | 6
(Netherlands) Tom Egberink | 1 | 6 | 4
4 | (Belgium) Joachim Gérard | 6 | 4 | 2
(Chile) Alexander Cataldo | 1 | 6 | 6
(Netherlands) Maikel Scheffers | 1 | 1
(Japan) Takuya Miki | 6 | 6
WC | (United Kingdom) Ben Bartram | 0 | 6 | 3
(Japan) Takashi Sanada | 6 | 3 | 6
(United States) Casey Ratzlaff | 1 | 5
3 | (Japan) Tokito Oda | 6 | 7
(Spain) Martín de la Puente | 7 | 6
WC | (Australia) Ben Weekes | 5 | 2
(Netherlands) Ruben Spaargaren | 3 | 2
2 | (Argentina) Gustavo Fernández | 6 | 6

Quarterfinals
1 | (United Kingdom) Alfie Hewett | 6 | 6
(United Kingdom) Gordon Reid | 2 | 4
(Chile) Alexander Cataldo | 6^{6} | 2
(Japan) Takuya Miki | 7^{8} | 6
(Japan) Takashi Sanada | 3 | 4
3 | (Japan) Tokito Oda | 6 | 6
(Spain) Martín de la Puente | 6 | 5 | 0
2 | (Argentina) Gustavo Fernández | 2 | 7 | 6

Semifinals
1 | (United Kingdom) Alfie Hewett | 6 | 6
(Japan) Takuya Miki | 1 | 1
3 | (Japan) Tokito Oda | 6 | 4 | 7
2 | (Argentina) Gustavo Fernández | 2 | 6 | 5

Final
1 | (United Kingdom) Alfie Hewett | 6 | 6
3 | (Japan) Tokito Oda | 3 | 1
