= 2023 Australian Open – Wheelchair women's doubles =

Wheelchair women's doubles
- 2023 Australian Open

Final
- Champions: (Netherlands) Diede de Groot (Netherlands) Aniek van Koot
- Runners-up: (Japan) Yui Kamiji (China) Zhu Zhenzhen
- Score: 6–3, 6–2

Details
- Draw: 8
- Seeds: 2

Events
Singles	men	women		boys	girls
Doubles	men	women	mixed	boys	girls
WC Singles	men	women	quad
WC Doubles	men	women	quad
← 2022 ·	Australian Open	· 2024 →

Two-time defending champions Diede de Groot and Aniek van Koot defeated Yui Kamiji and Zhu Zhenzhen in the final, 6–3, 6–2 to win the women's doubles wheelchair tennis title at the 2023 Australian Open.

== Seeds ==
1. (Netherlands) Diede de Groot / (Netherlands) Aniek van Koot (champions)
2. (Japan) Yui Kamiji / (China) Zhu Zhenzhen (final)

== Draw ==
=== Key ===
- Q = Qualifier
- WC = Wild card
- LL = Lucky loser
- Alt = Alternate
- ITF = ITF entry
- PR = Protected ranking
- SR = Special ranking
- SE = Special exempt
- JE = Junior exempt
- JR = Junior Accelerator Programme entrant
- CO = College Accelerator Programme entrant
- NG = Next Gen Accelerator Program entrant
- w/o = Walkover
- r = Retired
- d = Defaulted

=== Finals ===
Quarterfinals
1	(Netherlands) Diede de Groot (Netherlands) Aniek van Koot	6	6
(Chile) Macarena Cabrillana (Argentina) María Florencia Moreno	1	0
(Colombia) Angélica Bernal (Germany) Katharina Krüger	2	3
(United States) Dana Mathewson (United Kingdom) Lucy Shuker	6	6
(Japan) Shiori Funamizu (Japan) Saki Takamuro	2	3
(South Africa) Kgothatso Montjane (Japan) Manami Tanaka	6	6
(Netherlands) Jiske Griffioen (Japan) Momoko Ohtani	2	0
2	(Japan) Yui Kamiji (China) Zhu Zhenzhen	6	6

Semifinals
1	(Netherlands) Diede de Groot (Netherlands) Aniek van Koot	6	6
(United States) Dana Mathewson (United Kingdom) Lucy Shuker	2	1
(South Africa) Kgothatso Montjane (Japan) Manami Tanaka	2	5
2	(Japan) Yui Kamiji (China) Zhu Zhenzhen	6	7

Final
1	(Netherlands) Diede de Groot (Netherlands) Aniek van Koot	6	6
2	(Japan) Yui Kamiji (China) Zhu Zhenzhen	3	2
