= 2023 Australian Open – Women's singles qualifying =

Women's singles qualifying
- 2023 Australian Open

Events
Singles	men	women		boys	girls
Doubles	men	women	mixed	boys	girls
WC Singles	men	women	quad	boys	girls
WC Doubles	men	women	quad	boys	girls

Qualification
Singles	men	women
- Australian Open

This article shows the qualifying draw for women's singles at the 2023 Australian Open.

== Seeds ==
1. (United States) Alycia Parks (second round)
2. (Czech Republic) Linda Nosková (first round)
3. (Slovakia) Anna Karolína Schmiedlová (qualified)
4. (Spain) Cristina Bucșa (qualified)
5. (Poland) Magdalena Fręch (second round)
6. (Croatia) Ana Konjuh (first round)
7. (Italy) Sara Errani (first round)
8. Diana Shnaider (qualified)
9. (France) Léolia Jeanjean (qualifying competition, lucky loser)
10. (Hungary) Réka Luca Jani (first round)
11. (United States) Katie Volynets (qualified)
12. (Netherlands) Arantxa Rus (first round)
13. (Romania) Elena-Gabriela Ruse (second round)
14. (Brazil) Laura Pigossi (qualifying competition, lucky loser)
15. (Sweden) Rebecca Peterson (first round)
16. (Germany) Anna-Lena Friedsam (second round)
17. (France) Clara Burel (qualified)
18. (Spain) Marina Bassols Ribera (second round)
19. (Switzerland) Ylena In-Albon (first round)
20. (Switzerland) Simona Waltert (qualifying competition)
21. (United States) Elizabeth Mandlik (qualifying competition, lucky loser)
22. (Germany) Eva Lys (qualified)
23. (United States) CoCo Vandeweghe (qualified)
24. (United States) Ann Li (second round)
25. (Spain) Rebeka Masarova (second round)
26. (United Kingdom) Jodie Burrage (qualifying competition)
27. (Czech Republic) Brenda Fruhvirtová (qualified)
28. (Slovakia) Viktória Kužmová (first round)
29. Erika Andreeva (qualifying competition)
30. (United Kingdom) Katie Boulter (second round)
31. (Ukraine) Lesia Tsurenko (qualified)
32. (Japan) Nao Hibino (qualifying competition)

== Qualifiers ==
1. (Czech Republic) Sára Bejlek
2. (Canada) Katherine Sebov
3. (Slovakia) Anna Karolína Schmiedlová
4. (Spain) Cristina Bucșa
5. (Italy) Lucrezia Stefanini
6. Oksana Selekhmeteva
7. (United States) CoCo Vandeweghe
8. Diana Shnaider
9. (Ukraine) Lesia Tsurenko
10. (France) Clara Burel
11. (United States) Katie Volynets
12. (Czech Republic) Brenda Fruhvirtová
13. (France) Séléna Janicijevic
14. (Netherlands) Arianne Hartono
15. (Germany) Eva Lys
16. Polina Kudermetova

== Lucky losers ==
1. (France) Léolia Jeanjean
2. (Brazil) Laura Pigossi
3. (United States) Elizabeth Mandlik

== Draw ==
=== First qualifier ===
First round
1	(United States) Alycia Parks	7^{7}	7^{7}
WC	(Australia) Alexandra Bozovic	6^{4}	6^{2}
Darya Astakhova	4	0
(Czech Republic) Sára Bejlek	6	6
PR	(Ukraine) Katarina Zavatska	6	6
(Netherlands) Eva Vedder	2	3
PR	(Austria) Barbara Haas	4	1
29	Erika Andreeva	6	6

Second round
1	(United States) Alycia Parks	7	4	2
(Czech Republic) Sára Bejlek	5	6	6
PR	(Ukraine) Katarina Zavatska	6	3	2
29	Erika Andreeva	4	6	6

Qualifying competition
(Czech Republic) Sára Bejlek	6	6
29	Erika Andreeva	2	3

=== Second qualifier ===
First round
2	(Czech Republic) Linda Nosková	4	6	4
(Canada) Katherine Sebov	6	3	6
(Australia) Priscilla Hon	6	6^{2}	6
(United States) Katrina Scott	3	7^{7}	1
WC	(Australia) Astra Sharma	6	5	6
(Germany) Katharina Hobgarski	3	7	1
(Belgium) Greet Minnen	7^{8}	6^{4}	1
20	(Switzerland) Simona Waltert	6^{6}	7^{7}	6

Second round
(Canada) Katherine Sebov	6	6
(Australia) Priscilla Hon	2	2
WC	(Australia) Astra Sharma	2	4
20	(Switzerland) Simona Waltert	6	6

Qualifying competition
(Canada) Katherine Sebov	6	6
20	(Switzerland) Simona Waltert	3	4

=== Third qualifier ===
First round
3	(Slovakia) Anna Karolína Schmiedlová	6	6
Irina Khromacheva	2	3
(France) Jessika Ponchet	6	6
(United Kingdom) Katie Swan	4	3
(Mexico) Marcela Zacarías	6^{6}	3
(Japan) Mai Hontama	7^{8}	6
(United Kingdom) Sonay Kartal	4	6	1
21	(United States) Elizabeth Mandlik	6	3	6

Second round
3	(Slovakia) Anna Karolína Schmiedlová	6	6
(France) Jessika Ponchet	1	1
(Japan) Mai Hontama	2	2
21	(United States) Elizabeth Mandlik	6	6

Qualifying competition
3	(Slovakia) Anna Karolína Schmiedlová	6	6
21	(United States) Elizabeth Mandlik	4	4

=== Fourth qualifier ===
First round
4	(Spain) Cristina Bucșa	6	6
WC	(Australia) Kaylah McPhee	4	0
(United States) Ashlyn Krueger	6	1	6
PR	(Canada) Eugenie Bouchard	3	6	4
(Sweden) Mirjam Björklund	7	6
Ekaterina Reyngold	5	1
(United States) Louisa Chirico	6^{3}	6	6^{5}
32	(Japan) Nao Hibino	7^{7}	2	7^{10}

Second round
4	(Spain) Cristina Bucșa	6	6
(United States) Ashlyn Krueger	2	0
(Sweden) Mirjam Björklund	1	6	6^{3}
32	(Japan) Nao Hibino	6	4	7^{10}

Qualifying competition
4	(Spain) Cristina Bucșa	7^{12}	6
32	(Japan) Nao Hibino	6^{10}	2

=== Fifth qualifier ===
First round
5	(Poland) Magdalena Fręch	6	6
(Austria) Sinja Kraus	2	0
(United States) Sachia Vickery	6	6
PR	(Liechtenstein) Kathinka von Deichmann	0	2
Anastasia Zakharova	3	5
(Italy) Lucrezia Stefanini	6	7
(Romania) Gabriela Lee	5	3
25	(Spain) Rebeka Masarova	7	6

Second round
5	(Poland) Magdalena Fręch	4	5
(United States) Sachia Vickery	6	7
(Italy) Lucrezia Stefanini	1	6	6
25	(Spain) Rebeka Masarova	6	3	3

Qualifying competition
(United States) Sachia Vickery	0	0^{r}
(Italy) Lucrezia Stefanini	6	3

=== Sixth qualifier ===
First round
6	(Croatia) Ana Konjuh	6^{5}	6	6^{7}
(United States) Sophie Chang	7^{7}	3	7^{10}
Elina Avanesyan	6	6
WC	(Australia) Lizette Cabrera	2	3
Oksana Selekhmeteva	6	6
Vitalia Diatchenko	0	2
(Cyprus) Raluca Șerban	3	1
24	(United States) Ann Li	6	6

Second round
(United States) Sophie Chang	6	5	6
Elina Avanesyan	3	7	3
Oksana Selekhmeteva	6	7
24	(United States) Ann Li	1	5

Qualifying competition
(United States) Sophie Chang	3	3
Oksana Selekhmeteva	6	6

=== Seventh qualifier ===
First round
7	(Italy) Sara Errani	6^{5}	4
(South Korea) Jang Su-jeong	7^{7}	6
(United States) Hailey Baptiste	4	5
(United Kingdom) Yuriko Miyazaki	6	7
(Croatia) Petra Marčinko	6	6
(Germany) Mona Barthel	2	4
PR	(Australia) Arina Rodionova	4	6^{8}
23	(United States) CoCo Vandeweghe	6	7^{10}

Second round
(South Korea) Jang Su-jeong	4	6^{2}
(United Kingdom) Yuriko Miyazaki	6	7^{7}
(Croatia) Petra Marčinko	4	2
23	(United States) CoCo Vandeweghe	6	6

Qualifying competition
(United Kingdom) Yuriko Miyazaki	3	7^{7}	6^{1}
23	(United States) CoCo Vandeweghe	6	6^{3}	7^{10}

=== Eighth qualifier ===
First round
8	Diana Shnaider	7	6
(Switzerland) Joanne Züger	5	0
(Argentina) María Lourdes Carlé	2	6^{6}
(United States) Robin Montgomery	6	7^{8}
Anastasia Tikhonova	6	6
(Netherlands) Suzan Lamens	2	2
(South Korea) Han Na-lae	7^{7}	6
28	(Slovakia) Viktória Kužmová	6^{5}	4

Second round
8	Diana Shnaider	6	6
(United States) Robin Montgomery	4	4
Anastasia Tikhonova	6	6
(South Korea) Han Na-lae	3	4

Qualifying competition
8	Diana Shnaider	6	6
Anastasia Tikhonova	2	1

=== Ninth qualifier ===
First round
9	(France) Léolia Jeanjean	7^{7}	1	7^{10}
(Romania) Irina Bara	6^{5}	6	6^{7}
(United States) Kayla Day	6	1	6
Ekaterina Makarova	2	6	4
(Spain) Aliona Bolsova	7^{7}	6
(United Kingdom) Heather Watson	6^{4}	3
(Japan) Yuki Naito	2	1
31	(Ukraine) Lesia Tsurenko	6	6

Second round
9	(France) Léolia Jeanjean	7^{7}	1	6
(United States) Kayla Day	6^{5}	6	1
(Spain) Aliona Bolsova	1	2
31	(Ukraine) Lesia Tsurenko	6	6

Qualifying competition
9	(France) Léolia Jeanjean	4	2
31	(Ukraine) Lesia Tsurenko	6	6

=== Tenth qualifier ===
First round
10	(Hungary) Réka Luca Jani	1	0
(Greece) Despina Papamichail	6	6
(Brazil) Carolina Alves	2	4
(Serbia) Olga Danilović	6	6
(Canada) Carol Zhao	6	6
(Hong Kong) Eudice Chong	3	2
(France) Elsa Jacquemot	1	2
17	(France) Clara Burel	6	6

Second round
(Greece) Despina Papamichail	3	1
(Serbia) Olga Danilović	6	6
(Canada) Carol Zhao	7^{7}	4	6^{2}
17	(France) Clara Burel	6^{4}	6	7^{10}

Qualifying competition
(Serbia) Olga Danilović	6	0	2
17	(France) Clara Burel	3	6	6

=== Eleventh qualifier ===
First round
11	(United States) Katie Volynets	6^{7}	6	6
(Georgia (country)) Ekaterine Gorgodze	7^{9}	1	1
(Spain) Leyre Romero Gormaz	6	3	2
(Uzbekistan) Nigina Abduraimova	2	6	6
(France) Kristina Mladenovic	6	3	6
(Australia) Maddison Inglis	3	6	4
(Greece) Valentini Grammatikopoulou	2	1
18	(Spain) Marina Bassols Ribera	6	6

Second round
11	(United States) Katie Volynets	6	4	7^{10}
(Uzbekistan) Nigina Abduraimova	1	6	6^{7}
(France) Kristina Mladenovic	6	6^{8}	7
18	(Spain) Marina Bassols Ribera	2	7^{10}	5

Qualifying competition
11	(United States) Katie Volynets	6	4	6
(France) Kristina Mladenovic	3	6	2

=== Twelfth qualifier ===
First round
12	(Netherlands) Arantxa Rus	4	0
(Spain) Jéssica Bouzas Maneiro	6	6
WC	(Australia) Ellen Perez	6	6
WC	(Australia) Petra Hule	0	2
(Mexico) Fernanda Contreras Gómez	3	7^{8}	4
(Ukraine) Daria Snigur	6	6^{6}	6
(Serbia) Natalija Stevanović	0	6^{0}
27	(Czech Republic) Brenda Fruhvirtová	6	7^{7}

Second round
(Spain) Jéssica Bouzas Maneiro	6	6
WC	(Australia) Ellen Perez	3	2
(Ukraine) Daria Snigur	7	6^{3}	3
27	(Czech Republic) Brenda Fruhvirtová	5	7^{7}	6

Qualifying competition
(Spain) Jéssica Bouzas Maneiro	6	6^{2}	4
27	(Czech Republic) Brenda Fruhvirtová	3	7^{7}	6

=== Thirteenth qualifier ===
First round
13	(Romania) Elena-Gabriela Ruse	6	3	6
WC	(Australia) Seone Mendez	1	6	1
(United States) Robin Anderson	3	2
(France) Séléna Janicijevic	6	6
(Czech Republic) Barbora Palicová	6	7^{7}
(France) Chloé Paquet	4	6^{3}
WC	(Australia) Elysia Bolton	2	4
26	(United Kingdom) Jodie Burrage	6	6

Second round
13	(Romania) Elena-Gabriela Ruse	5	3
(France) Séléna Janicijevic	7	6
(Czech Republic) Barbora Palicová	1	2
26	(United Kingdom) Jodie Burrage	6	6

Qualifying competition
(France) Séléna Janicijevic	6	1	6
26	(United Kingdom) Jodie Burrage	3	6	2

=== Fourteenth qualifier ===
First round
14	(Brazil) Laura Pigossi	6	6
(Belgium) Magali Kempen	2	2
(Japan) Misaki Doi	4	7^{7}	6
(Philippines) Alexandra Eala	6	6^{1}	3
(Turkey) İpek Öz	3	3
WC	(Australia) Destanee Aiava	6	6
(Netherlands) Arianne Hartono	6	6
19	(Switzerland) Ylena In-Albon	4	4

Second round
14	(Brazil) Laura Pigossi	w/o
(Japan) Misaki Doi
WC	(Australia) Destanee Aiava	6	3	6^{6}
(Netherlands) Arianne Hartono	3	6	7^{10}

Qualifying competition
14	(Brazil) Laura Pigossi	6	2	4
(Netherlands) Arianne Hartono	3	6	6

=== Fifteenth qualifier ===
First round
15	(Sweden) Rebecca Peterson	3	4
(Andorra) Victoria Jiménez Kasintseva	6	6
PR	(Australia) Zoe Hives	6	5	6
(France) Harmony Tan	2	7	1
(France) Carole Monnet	2	0
(Romania) Alexandra Cadanțu-Ignatik	6	6
(Spain) Rosa Vicens Mas	3	4
22	(Germany) Eva Lys	6	6

Second round
(Andorra) Victoria Jiménez Kasintseva	6	6
PR	(Australia) Zoe Hives	1	1
(Romania) Alexandra Cadanțu-Ignatik	4	1
22	(Germany) Eva Lys	6	6

Qualifying competition
(Andorra) Victoria Jiménez Kasintseva	3	4
22	(Germany) Eva Lys	6	6

=== Sixteenth qualifier ===
First round
16	(Germany) Anna-Lena Friedsam	6	6
(Croatia) Tara Würth	1	2
(Argentina) Paula Ormaechea	2	6	5
(United States) Asia Muhammad	6	2	7
Anastasia Gasanova	1	6	2
Polina Kudermetova	6	4	6
(United States) Caroline Dolehide	2	6	6^{5}
30	(United Kingdom) Katie Boulter	6	3	7^{10}

Second round
16	(Germany) Anna-Lena Friedsam	4	6	4
(United States) Asia Muhammad	6	4	6
Polina Kudermetova	6	6
30	(United Kingdom) Katie Boulter	1	3

Qualifying competition
(United States) Asia Muhammad	4	2
Polina Kudermetova	6	6
