= 2023 Australian Open – Men's singles qualifying =

Men's singles qualifying
- 2023 Australian Open

Events
Singles	men	women		boys	girls
Doubles	men	women	mixed	boys	girls
WC Singles	men	women	quad	boys	girls
WC Doubles	men	women	quad	boys	girls

Qualification
Singles	men	women
- Australian Open

The 2023 Australian Open – Men's singles qualifying was a series of tennis matches that took place from 9 to 12 January 2023 to determine the sixteen qualifiers into the main draw of the men's singles tournament, and, if necessary, the lucky losers.

== Seeds ==
1. (Chile) Alejandro Tabilo (second round)
2. (Italy) Marco Cecchinato (first round, retired)
3. (Moldova) Radu Albot (first round)
4. (Ecuador) Emilio Gómez (second round)
5. (Peru) Juan Pablo Varillas (qualifying competition, lucky loser)
6. (United States) Denis Kudla (qualifying competition, lucky loser)
7. (France) Hugo Gaston (second round, retired)
8. (Netherlands) Tim van Rijthoven (first round, retired)
9. (United States) Michael Mmoh (qualifying competition, lucky loser)
10. (Slovakia) Norbert Gombos (first round)
11. Pavel Kotov (qualifying competition, lucky loser)
12. (Switzerland) Dominic Stricker (qualifying competition)
13. (Italy) Francesco Passaro (second round)
14. (Spain) Pablo Andújar (first round)
15. (Austria) Jurij Rodionov (second round)
16. (Spain) Fernando Verdasco (second round)
17. (Argentina) Federico Delbonis (first round)
18. (Sweden) Elias Ymer (second round)
19. (Germany) Yannick Hanfmann (qualified)
20. (Belgium) Zizou Bergs (qualified)
21. (Australia) Aleksandar Vukic (qualified)
22. (Italy) Matteo Arnaldi (qualifying competition)
23. (Italy) Luca Nardi (first round)
24. (Slovakia) Lukáš Klein (first round)
25. (Slovakia) Jozef Kovalík (first round)
26. (Italy) Franco Agamenone (first round)
27. (Czech Republic) Vít Kopřiva (first round)
28. (France) Hugo Grenier (first round)
29. (Kazakhstan) Timofey Skatov (second round)
30. (Japan) Yosuke Watanuki (qualified)
31. (France) Manuel Guinard (first round)
32. (Austria) Filip Misolic (first round)

== Qualifiers ==
1. (France) Laurent Lokoli
2. (Australia) Max Purcell
3. (United States) Brandon Holt
4. (Germany) Jan-Lennard Struff
5. (Japan) Yosuke Watanuki
6. (Ukraine) Oleksii Krutykh
7. (Chinese Taipei) Hsu Yu-hsiou
8. (Czech Republic) Dalibor Svrčina
9. (Australia) Aleksandar Vukic
10. (Chile) Nicolás Jarry
11. (Mexico) Ernesto Escobedo
12. (France) Enzo Couacaud
13. (Italy) Mattia Bellucci
14. (Germany) Yannick Hanfmann
15. (Belgium) Zizou Bergs
16. (China) Shang Juncheng

== Lucky losers ==
1. Pavel Kotov
2. (Peru) Juan Pablo Varillas
3. (United States) Denis Kudla
4. (United States) Michael Mmoh

== Draw ==
Key

- Q = Qualifier
- WC = Wild card
- LL = Lucky loser
- Alt = Alternate
- ITF = ITF entry
- PR = Protected ranking
- SR = Special ranking
- SE = Special exempt
- JE = Junior exempt
- JR = Junior Accelerator Programme entrant
- CO = College Accelerator Programme entrant
- NG = Next Gen Accelerator Program entrant
- w/o = Walkover
- r = Retired
- d = Defaulted

=== First qualifier ===
First round
1	(Chile) Alejandro Tabilo	6	6
(Serbia) Nikola Milojević	0	2
(Austria) Sebastian Ofner	7^{8}	6
(Brazil) Felipe Meligeni Alves	6^{6}	4
(Switzerland) Antoine Bellier	3	3
(France) Laurent Lokoli	6	6
(Australia) Li Tu	6	6
25	(Slovakia) Jozef Kovalík	2	2

Second round
1	(Chile) Alejandro Tabilo	4	6^{4}
(Austria) Sebastian Ofner	6	7^{7}
(France) Laurent Lokoli	6	6^{6}	6
(Australia) Li Tu	1	7^{8}	2

Qualifying competition
(Austria) Sebastian Ofner	3	6^{5}
(France) Laurent Lokoli	6	7^{7}

=== Second qualifier ===
First round
2	(Italy) Marco Cecchinato	2	2^{r}
(Australia) Max Purcell	6	3
(Bosnia and Herzegovina) Damir Džumhur	6	6
(Bulgaria) Dimitar Kuzmanov	3	1
(Argentina) Renzo Olivo	1	2
PR	(Australia) Alex Bolt	6	6
(Switzerland) Alexander Ritschard	3	5
22	(Italy) Matteo Arnaldi	6	7

Second round
(Australia) Max Purcell	6	7
(Bosnia and Herzegovina) Damir Džumhur	4	5
PR	(Australia) Alex Bolt	7	5	4
22	(Italy) Matteo Arnaldi	5	7	6

Qualifying competition
(Australia) Max Purcell	6	6
22	(Italy) Matteo Arnaldi	4	3

=== Third qualifier ===
First round
3	(Moldova) Radu Albot	7	3	4
(United States) Brandon Holt	5	6	6
(Portugal) Gastão Elias	6^{5}	7^{7}	6
(Japan) Kaichi Uchida	7^{7}	6^{3}	1
(France) Geoffrey Blancaneaux	5	1
(Argentina) Marco Trungelliti	7	6
PR	(Australia) Marc Polmans	6	6
24	(Slovakia) Lukáš Klein	3	4

Second round
(United States) Brandon Holt	6	7^{7}
(Portugal) Gastão Elias	2	6^{5}
(Argentina) Marco Trungelliti	3	6	6
PR	(Australia) Marc Polmans	6	2	3

Qualifying competition
(United States) Brandon Holt	6	6
(Argentina) Marco Trungelliti	3	0

=== Fourth qualifier ===
First round
4	(Ecuador) Emilio Gómez	6	6^{4}	7^{10}
(United Kingdom) Liam Broady	3	7^{7}	6^{7}
(Germany) Jan-Lennard Struff	6	6
Alexander Shevchenko	4	4
WC	(Australia) Tristan Schoolkate	6^{7}	7	6
(Belgium) Kimmer Coppejans	7^{9}	5	4
(Italy) Raúl Brancaccio	6	6
26	(Italy) Franco Agamenone	4	1

Second round
4	(Ecuador) Emilio Gómez	1	4
(Germany) Jan-Lennard Struff	6	6
WC	(Australia) Tristan Schoolkate	6^{4}	6	7
(Italy) Raúl Brancaccio	7^{7}	4	5

Qualifying competition
(Germany) Jan-Lennard Struff	6	6
WC	(Australia) Tristan Schoolkate	1	4

=== Fifth qualifier ===
First round
5	(Peru) Juan Pablo Varillas	3	6	7^{10}
PR	(Italy) Roberto Marcora	6	3	6^{5}
(Canada) Alexis Galarneau	7^{7}	6
(United Kingdom) Ryan Peniston	6^{5}	2
(Kazakhstan) Mikhail Kukushkin	7	6
(Australia) James Duckworth	5	4
WC	(Australia) Philip Sekulic	4	2
30	(Japan) Yosuke Watanuki	6	6

Second round
5	(Peru) Juan Pablo Varillas	6^{8}	6	6
(Canada) Alexis Galarneau	7^{10}	3	4
(Kazakhstan) Mikhail Kukushkin	6	6^{3}	3
30	(Japan) Yosuke Watanuki	4	7^{7}	6

Qualifying competition
5	(Peru) Juan Pablo Varillas	3	4
30	(Japan) Yosuke Watanuki	6	6

=== Sixth qualifier ===
First round
6	(United States) Denis Kudla	6	6
(Australia) Omar Jasika	1	1
(United States) Aleksandar Kovacevic	5	6^{4}
(Spain) Carlos Taberner	7	7^{7}
(United States) Stefan Kozlov	5	2
(Ukraine) Oleksii Krutykh	7	6
(Italy) Gianluca Mager	6	3	7^{10}
32	(Austria) Filip Misolic	2	6	6^{6}

Second round
6	(United States) Denis Kudla	7	6
(Spain) Carlos Taberner	5	3
(Ukraine) Oleksii Krutykh	6	7^{7}
(Italy) Gianluca Mager	2	6^{3}

Qualifying competition
6	(United States) Denis Kudla	6	4	4
(Ukraine) Oleksii Krutykh	3	6	6

=== Seventh qualifier ===
First round
7	(France) Hugo Gaston	6	6
PR	Egor Gerasimov	1	1
(France) Alexandre Müller	7^{7}	6^{4}	6
WC	(Australia) James McCabe	6^{2}	7^{7}	3
(France) Evan Furness	6^{5}	2
(Chinese Taipei) Hsu Yu-hsiou	7^{7}	6
(Dominican Republic) Nick Hardt	6^{5}	2
18	(Sweden) Elias Ymer	7^{7}	6

Second round
7	(France) Hugo Gaston	2	0^{r}
(France) Alexandre Müller	6	4
(Chinese Taipei) Hsu Yu-hsiou	7^{7}	7^{7}
18	(Sweden) Elias Ymer	6^{4}	6^{4}

Qualifying competition
(France) Alexandre Müller	6^{4}	4
(Chinese Taipei) Hsu Yu-hsiou	7^{7}	6

=== Eighth qualifier ===
First round
8	(Netherlands) Tim van Rijthoven	3	0^{r}
(Switzerland) Leandro Riedi	6	3
(Argentina) Santiago Rodríguez Taverna	4	3
(Italy) Giulio Zeppieri	6	6
(United Kingdom) Paul Jubb	3	6	4
(Czech Republic) Dalibor Svrčina	6	1	6
(Argentina) Nicolás Kicker	6	6
17	(Argentina) Federico Delbonis	2	4

Second round
(Switzerland) Leandro Riedi	3	7^{7}	7^{13}
(Italy) Giulio Zeppieri	6	6^{4}	6^{11}
(Czech Republic) Dalibor Svrčina	2	7^{10}	2
(Argentina) Nicolás Kicker	6	6^{8}	0^{r}

Qualifying competition
(Switzerland) Leandro Riedi	0	4
(Czech Republic) Dalibor Svrčina	6	6

=== Ninth qualifier ===
First round
9	(United States) Michael Mmoh	6	6
WC	(United States) Bruno Kuzuhara	1	0
(Brazil) Matheus Pucinelli de Almeida	4	7^{7}	5
(France) Benoît Paire	6	6^{5}	7
(Argentina) Thiago Agustín Tirante	6	6
(Argentina) Facundo Mena	1	1
(Canada) Gabriel Diallo	3	4
21	(Australia) Aleksandar Vukic	6	6

Second round
9	(United States) Michael Mmoh	6	7^{7}
(France) Benoît Paire	4	6^{1}
(Argentina) Thiago Agustín Tirante	6^{4}	3
21	(Australia) Aleksandar Vukic	7^{7}	6

Qualifying competition
9	(United States) Michael Mmoh	4	5
21	(Australia) Aleksandar Vukic	6	7

=== Tenth qualifier ===
First round
10	(Slovakia) Norbert Gombos	4	1
PR	(Japan) Yūichi Sugita	6	6
(Italy) Andrea Vavassori	3	2
(United States) Emilio Nava	6	6
(Chile) Nicolás Jarry	5	6	7^{10}
(Finland) Otto Virtanen	7	4	6^{6}
(United States) Nicolas Moreno de Alboran	3	4
29	(Kazakhstan) Timofey Skatov	6	6

Second round
PR	(Japan) Yūichi Sugita	3	6	3
(United States) Emilio Nava	6	3	6
(Chile) Nicolás Jarry	4	7	6
29	(Kazakhstan) Timofey Skatov	6	5	1

Qualifying competition
(United States) Emilio Nava	6^{3}	3
(Chile) Nicolás Jarry	7^{7}	6

=== Eleventh qualifier ===
First round
11	Pavel Kotov	7^{7}	6
(Argentina) Genaro Alberto Olivieri	6^{5}	2
(Switzerland) Henri Laaksonen	6	6
(Italy) Riccardo Bonadio	4	4
(Japan) Rio Noguchi	7	6
WC	(Australia) Edward Winter	5	1
(Mexico) Ernesto Escobedo	6	6
23	(Italy) Luca Nardi	3	1

Second round
11	Pavel Kotov	7^{9}	6
(Switzerland) Henri Laaksonen	6^{7}	2
(Japan) Rio Noguchi	3	4
(Mexico) Ernesto Escobedo	6	6

Qualifying competition
11	Pavel Kotov	3	6^{5}
(Mexico) Ernesto Escobedo	6	7^{7}

=== Twelfth qualifier ===
First round
12	(Switzerland) Dominic Stricker	6	6
(Germany) Cedrik-Marcel Stebe	3	4
(United States) Mitchell Krueger	6	6
(Italy) Flavio Cobolli	0	4
(Portugal) Frederico Ferreira Silva	3	6^{5}
PR	(United States) Bradley Klahn	6	7^{7}
(France) Enzo Couacaud	5	7	7^{10}
28	(France) Hugo Grenier	7	5	6^{3}

Second round
12	(Switzerland) Dominic Stricker	6	7^{7}
(United States) Mitchell Krueger	4	6^{4}
PR	(United States) Bradley Klahn	3	6	4
(France) Enzo Couacaud	6	4	6

Qualifying competition
12	(Switzerland) Dominic Stricker	6^{2}	6^{7}
(France) Enzo Couacaud	7^{7}	7^{9}

=== Thirteenth qualifier ===
First round
13	(Italy) Francesco Passaro	6	3	6
(Czech Republic) Lukáš Rosol	3	6	3
(Chinese Taipei) Wu Tung-lin	3	4
(Italy) Mattia Bellucci	6	6
(Italy) Luciano Darderi	7^{7}	6
(Argentina) Juan Pablo Ficovich	6^{3}	3
WC	(Australia) Dane Sweeny	6	6
27	(Czech Republic) Vít Kopřiva	1	1

Second round
13	(Italy) Francesco Passaro	6^{5}	3
(Italy) Mattia Bellucci	7^{7}	6
(Italy) Luciano Darderi	7	1	6
WC	(Australia) Dane Sweeny	5	6	1

Qualifying competition
(Italy) Mattia Bellucci	6	6
(Italy) Luciano Darderi	4	1

=== Fourteenth qualifier ===
First round
14	(Spain) Pablo Andújar	1	2
WC	(Australia) Adam Walton	6	6
WC	(Australia) Derek Pham	2	2
(Germany) Peter Gojowczyk	6	6
(Argentina) Facundo Díaz Acosta	7^{8}	6
(Netherlands) Gijs Brouwer	6^{6}	4
(Germany) Maximilian Marterer	4	0^{r}
19	(Germany) Yannick Hanfmann	6	0

Second round
WC	(Australia) Adam Walton	6	2	4
(Germany) Peter Gojowczyk	2	6	6
(Argentina) Facundo Díaz Acosta	7^{7}	3	5
19	(Germany) Yannick Hanfmann	6^{2}	6	7

Qualifying competition
(Germany) Peter Gojowczyk	2	2
19	(Germany) Yannick Hanfmann	6	6

=== Fifteenth qualifier ===
First round
15	(Austria) Jurij Rodionov	7^{7}	6
(Romania) Nicholas David Ionel	6^{1}	4
(Italy) Francesco Maestrelli	6^{5}	6	6^{5}
(Bulgaria) Adrian Andreev	7^{7}	4	7^{10}
(Serbia) Miljan Zekić	2	2
(Chile) Tomás Barrios Vera	6	6
WC	(Australia) Jeremy Jin	6^{3}	1
20	(Belgium) Zizou Bergs	7^{7}	6

Second round
15	(Austria) Jurij Rodionov	4	1
(Bulgaria) Adrian Andreev	6	6
(Chile) Tomás Barrios Vera	4	6	2
20	(Belgium) Zizou Bergs	6	3	6

Qualifying competition
(Bulgaria) Adrian Andreev	1	2
20	(Belgium) Zizou Bergs	6	6

=== Sixteenth qualifier ===
First round
16	(Spain) Fernando Verdasco	3	6	6
(Croatia) Nino Serdarušić	6	4	2
(Hungary) Fábián Marozsán	4	6^{2}
(China) Shang Juncheng	6	7^{7}
(France) Antoine Escoffier	6	3	5
(Hungary) Zsombor Piros	2	6	7
(Italy) Andrea Pellegrino	7^{9}	5	7^{10}
31	(France) Manuel Guinard	6^{7}	7	6^{4}

Second round
16	(Spain) Fernando Verdasco	3	6	4
(China) Shang Juncheng	6	2	6
(Hungary) Zsombor Piros	6	7
(Italy) Andrea Pellegrino	2	5

Qualifying competition
(China) Shang Juncheng	6	6
(Hungary) Zsombor Piros	3	4
