= 2023 Australian Open – Men's singles =

Tennis championship

Men's singles
- 2023 Australian Open

Final
- Champion: (Serbia) Novak Djokovic
- Runner-up: (Greece) Stefanos Tsitsipas
- Score: 6–3, 7–6^{(7–4)}, 7–6^{(7–5)}

Details
- Draw: 128
- Seeds: 32

Events
Singles	men	women		boys	girls
Doubles	men	women	mixed	boys	girls
WC Singles	men	women	quad	boys	girls
WC Doubles	men	women	quad	boys	girls
- Australian Open

Novak Djokovic defeated Stefanos Tsitsipas in the final, 6–3, 7–6^{(7–4)}, 7–6^{(7–5)} to win the men's singles tennis title at the 2023 Australian Open. It was his record-extending tenth Australian Open title and 22nd major men's singles title overall, equaling Rafael Nadal's all-time record. He was the second man to win ten titles at a single major, after Nadal at the French Open. Djokovic extended his match winning-streak at the Australian Open to an Open Era record 28 matches.

Nadal was the defending champion, but lost in the second round to Mackenzie McDonald. This marked the two-time champion, six-time finalist, Olympic gold medalist, and former world No. 1's final Australian Open appearance, as he retired from the sport the following year.

Carlos Alcaraz, Casper Ruud, Tsitsipas and Djokovic were in contention for the world No. 1 singles ranking at the beginning of the tournament. By winning the tournament, Djokovic reclaimed the top spot. Alcaraz, the incumbent world No. 1, withdrew from the tournament due to a right leg injury.

As in the previous major held a few months earlier, neither of the top two seeds advanced to the quarterfinals, with Nadal and Ruud both losing in the second round; this marked the first men's singles major since the 2002 Australian Open where the top two seeds lost prior to the third round. Tsitsipas was the youngest finalist since Djokovic in 2011. Tommy Paul was the first American man to reach the semifinals since Andy Roddick in 2009.

With his win over Thanasi Kokkinakis in the longest match of his career, Andy Murray won a match from two sets down for a record eleventh time.

== Seeds ==
1. (Spain) Rafael Nadal (second round)
2. (Norway) Casper Ruud (second round)
3. (Greece) Stefanos Tsitsipas (final)
4. (Serbia) Novak Djokovic (champion)
5. (Note: On 1 March 2022, the ATP announced that players from Russia and Belarus will not be allowed to compete under the name or flag of Russia or Belarus following the 2022 Russian invasion of Ukraine.)Andrey Rublev (quarterfinals)
6. (Canada) Félix Auger-Aliassime (fourth round)
7. Daniil Medvedev (third round)
8. (United States) Taylor Fritz (second round)
9. (Denmark) Holger Rune (fourth round)
10. (Poland) Hubert Hurkacz (fourth round)
11. (United Kingdom) Cameron Norrie (third round)
12. (Germany) Alexander Zverev (second round)
13. (Italy) Matteo Berrettini (first round)
14. (Spain) Pablo Carreño Busta (second round)
15. (Italy) Jannik Sinner (fourth round)
16. (United States) Frances Tiafoe (third round)
17. (Italy) Lorenzo Musetti (first round)
18. Karen Khachanov (semifinals)
19. (Australia) Nick Kyrgios (withdrew)
20. (Canada) Denis Shapovalov (third round)
21. (Croatia) Borna Ćorić (first round)
22. (Australia) Alex de Minaur (fourth round)
23. (Argentina) Diego Schwartzman (second round)
24. (Spain) Roberto Bautista Agut (fourth round)
25. (United Kingdom) Dan Evans (third round)
26. (Serbia) Miomir Kecmanović (first round)
27. (Bulgaria) Grigor Dimitrov (third round)
28. (Argentina) Francisco Cerúndolo (third round)
29. (United States) Sebastian Korda (quarterfinals, retired)
30. (Spain) Alejandro Davidovich Fokina (second round)
31. (Japan) Yoshihito Nishioka (fourth round)
32. (Netherlands) Botic van de Zandschulp (second round)

Click on the seed number of a player to go to their draw section.

== Draw ==
Key

- Q = Qualifier
- WC = Wild card
- LL = Lucky loser
- Alt = Alternate
- ITF = ITF entry
- PR = Protected ranking
- SR = Special ranking
- SE = Special exempt
- JE = Junior exempt
- JR = Junior Accelerator Programme entrant
- CO = College Accelerator Programme entrant
- NG = Next Gen Accelerator Program entrant
- w/o = Walkover
- r = Retired
- d = Defaulted

=== Finals ===
Quarterfinals
18	Karen Khachanov	7^{7}	6	3
29	(United States) Sebastian Korda	6^{5}	3	0^{r}
3	(Greece) Stefanos Tsitsipas	6	7^{7}	6
(Czech Republic) Jiří Lehečka	3	6^{2}	4
5	Andrey Rublev	1	2	4
4	(Serbia) Novak Djokovic	6	6	6
(United States) Ben Shelton	6^{6}	3	7	4
(United States) Tommy Paul	7^{8}	6	5	6

Semifinals
18	Karen Khachanov	6^{2}	4	7^{8}	3
3	(Greece) Stefanos Tsitsipas	7^{7}	6	6^{6}	6
4	(Serbia) Novak Djokovic	7	6	6
(United States) Tommy Paul	5	1	2

Final
3	(Greece) Stefanos Tsitsipas	3	6^{4}	6^{5}
4	(Serbia) Novak Djokovic	6	7^{7}	7^{7}

=== Top half ===
==== Section 1 ====
First round
1	(Spain) R Nadal	7	2	6	6
(United Kingdom) J Draper	5	6	4	1
(United States) B Nakashima	6^{5}	6^{1}	6	7^{12}	4
(United States) M McDonald	7^{7}	7^{7}	1	6^{10}	6
(Spain) J Munar	3	2	2
Q	(Czech Republic) D Svrčina	6	6	6
(Sweden) M Ymer	4	2	5
31	(Japan) Y Nishioka	6	6	7
18	K Khachanov	7^{7}	6	6
(Spain) B Zapata Miralles	6^{3}	2	0
(Argentina) S Báez	4	4	4
WC	(Australia) J Kubler	6	6	6
(Germany) O Otte	2	4	7^{7}	5
Q	(China) J Shang	6	6	6^{2}	7
(Germany) D Altmaier	3	3	7^{7}	6^{6}
16	(United States) F Tiafoe	6	6	6^{5}	7^{8}

Second round
1	(Spain) R Nadal	4	4	5
(United States) M McDonald	6	6	7
Q	(Czech Republic) D Svrčina	3	4	2
31	(Japan) Y Nishioka	6	6	6
18	K Khachanov	6	5	6	6
WC	(Australia) J Kubler	4	7	4	2
Q	(China) J Shang	4	4	1
16	(United States) F Tiafoe	6	6	6

Third round
(United States) M McDonald	6^{6}	3	2
31	(Japan) Y Nishioka	7^{8}	6	6
18	K Khachanov	6	6	3	7^{11}
16	(United States) F Tiafoe	3	4	6	6^{9}

Fourth round
31	(Japan) Y Nishioka	0	0	6^{4}
18	K Khachanov	6	6	7^{7}

==== Section 2 ====
First round
10	(Poland) H Hurkacz	7^{7}	6	6
(Spain) P Martínez	6^{1}	2	2
(Italy) L Sonego	7^{7}	6	6^{6}	6
(Portugal) N Borges	6^{4}	3	7^{8}	1
Q	(Mexico) E Escobedo	5	2	6	3
(Japan) T Daniel	7	6	3	6
(Serbia) D Lajović	4	6	4	1
20	(Canada) D Shapovalov	6	4	6	6
29	(United States) S Korda	6	1	6	6
(Chile) C Garín	4	6	3	2
Q	(Japan) Y Watanuki	6	6	6
(France) A Rinderknech	3	3	2
WC	(Australia) J Millman	6^{8}	7	6^{2}	6	6
(Switzerland) M-A Hüsler	7^{10}	5	7^{7}	2	3
(United States) M Giron	0	1	2
7	D Medvedev	6	6	6

Second round
10	(Poland) H Hurkacz	3	7^{7}	2	6	6
(Italy) L Sonego	6	6^{3}	6	3	3
(Japan) T Daniel	3	6^{3}	5
20	(Canada) D Shapovalov	6	7^{7}	7
29	(United States) S Korda	6	7	6
Q	(Japan) Y Watanuki	2	5	4
WC	(Australia) J Millman	5	2	2
7	D Medvedev	7	6	6

Third round
10	(Poland) H Hurkacz	7^{7}	6	1	4	6
20	(Canada) D Shapovalov	6^{3}	4	6	6	3
29	(United States) S Korda	7^{9}	6	7^{7}
7	D Medvedev	6^{7}	3	6^{4}

Fourth round
10	(Poland) H Hurkacz	6	3	2	6	6^{7}
29	(United States) S Korda	3	6	6	1	7^{10}

==== Section 3 ====
First round
3	(Greece) S Tsitsipas	6	6	7^{8}
(France) Q Halys	3	4	6^{6}
Q	(Germany) Y Hanfmann	6	6	3	6^{5}	3
WC	(Australia) R Hijikata	4	4	6	7^{7}	6
(Netherlands) T Griekspoor	6	7^{7}	6
LL	P Kotov	3	6^{3}	3
I Ivashka	3	6	5	3
32	(Netherlands) B van de Zandschulp	6	3	7	6
17	(Italy) L Musetti	4	1	7^{7}	6	6^{4}
PR	(South Africa) L Harris	6	6	6^{0}	2	7^{10}
(Argentina) F Coria	6	5	6	6^{6}	2
(Hungary) M Fucsovics	4	7	2	7^{8}	6
(Argentina) TM Etcheverry	3	6	6	6
(France) G Barrère	6	3	4	4
PR	(United Kingdom) K Edmund	4	0	2
15	(Italy) J Sinner	6	6	6

Second round
3	(Greece) S Tsitsipas	6	6	6
WC	(Australia) R Hijikata	3	0	2
(Netherlands) T Griekspoor	6	6	6
32	(Netherlands) B van de Zandschulp	4	4	4
PR	(South Africa) L Harris	2	3	7	4
(Hungary) M Fucsovics	6	6	5	6
(Argentina) TM Etcheverry	3	2	2
15	(Italy) J Sinner	6	6	6

Third round
3	(Greece) S Tsitsipas	6	7^{7}	6
(Netherlands) T Griekspoor	2	6^{5}	3
(Hungary) M Fucsovics	6	6	1	2	0
15	(Italy) J Sinner	4	4	6	6	6

Fourth round
3	(Greece) S Tsitsipas	6	6	3	4	6
15	(Italy) J Sinner	4	4	6	6	3

==== Section 4 ====
First round
11	(United Kingdom) C Norrie	7^{7}	6	6
WC	(France) L Van Assche	6^{3}	0	3
(Brazil) T Monteiro	3	6^{2}	3
(France) C Lestienne	6	7^{7}	6
WC	(United States) C Eubanks	6	6^{1}	6	4	6
(South Korea) S-w Kwon	3	7^{7}	3	6	4
(Czech Republic) J Lehečka	6	6	6
21	(Croatia) B Ćorić	3	3	3
28	(Argentina) F Cerúndolo	6	6	6
PR	(Argentina) G Pella	4	4	3
(France) C Moutet	6	5	6	4	7
WC	(China) Y Wu	4	7	2	6	5
(Slovakia) A Molčan	6^{3}	6	1	7^{7}	6
PR	(Switzerland) S Wawrinka	7^{7}	3	6	6^{2}	4
(Canada) V Pospisil	6	6^{4}	6^{3}	3
6	(Canada) F Auger-Aliassime	1	7^{7}	7^{7}	6

Second round
11	(United Kingdom) C Norrie	6	3	7^{7}	6
(France) C Lestienne	3	6	6^{2}	3
WC	(United States) C Eubanks	4	4	6	3
(Czech Republic) J Lehečka	6	6	3	6
28	(Argentina) F Cerúndolo	3	6	6	7
(France) C Moutet	6	4	2	5
(Slovakia) A Molčan	6	6	3	2	2
6	(Canada) F Auger-Aliassime	3	3	6	6	6

Third round
11	(United Kingdom) C Norrie	7^{10}	3	6	1	4
(Czech Republic) J Lehečka	6^{8}	6	3	6	6
28	(Argentina) F Cerúndolo	1	6	1	4
6	(Canada) F Auger-Aliassime	6	3	6	6

Fourth round
(Czech Republic) J Lehečka	4	6	7^{7}	7^{7}
6	(Canada) F Auger-Aliassime	6	3	6^{2}	6^{3}

=== Bottom half ===
==== Section 5 ====
First round
5	A Rublev	6	6	6
WC	(Austria) D Thiem	3	4	2
Q	(Australia) M Purcell	6	3	4	6^{11}
(Finland) E Ruusuvuori	4	6	6	7^{13}
(Colombia) DE Galán	6	5	1	4
PR	(France) J Chardy	1	7	6	6
(Argentina) F Bagnis	4	6	4	4
25	(United Kingdom) D Evans	6	4	6	6
LL	(United States) D Kudla	3	7	7^{8}	6
R Safiullin	6	5	6^{6}	3
(France) R Gasquet	3	4	3
(France) U Humbert	6	6	6
(United States) M Cressy	7^{7}	7	3	6
(Spain) A Ramos Viñolas	6^{2}	5	6	3
(Serbia) F Krajinović	2	3	4
9	(Denmark) H Rune	6	6	6

Second round
5	A Rublev	6	6	6^{2}	6
(Finland) E Ruusuvuori	2	4	7^{7}	3
PR	(France) J Chardy	4	4	1
25	(United Kingdom) D Evans	6	6	6
LL	(United States) D Kudla	2	7^{7}	2	4
(France) U Humbert	6	6^{5}	6	6
(United States) M Cressy	5	4	4
9	(Denmark) H Rune	7	6	6

Third round
5	A Rublev	6	6	6
25	(United Kingdom) D Evans	4	2	3
(France) U Humbert	4	2	6^{5}
9	(Denmark) H Rune	6	6	7^{7}

Fourth round
5	A Rublev	6	3	6	4	7^{11}
9	(Denmark) H Rune	3	6	3	6	6^{9}

==== Section 6 ====
First round
14	(Spain) P Carreño Busta	7^{7}	6	7^{7}
(Argentina) P Cachin	6^{4}	1	6^{3}
Q	(Italy) M Bellucci	6	3	6^{5}	4
(France) B Bonzi	4	6	7^{7}	6
(United States) J Isner	7^{7}	6^{8}	2	2
(France) A Mannarino	6^{5}	7^{10}	6	6
Q	(Chinese Taipei) Y-h Hsu	2	2	3
22	(Australia) A de Minaur	6	6	6
27	(Bulgaria) G Dimitrov	7^{7}	7	6
A Karatsev	6^{3}	5	2
Q	(Belgium) Z Bergs	4	6	4	1
(Serbia) L Djere	6	1	6	6
Q	(France) E Couacaud	6	7	6
PR	(Bolivia) H Dellien	4	5	0
(Spain) R Carballés Baena	3	4	0
4	(Serbia) N Djokovic	6	6	6

Second round
14	(Spain) P Carreño Busta	6	6	6^{5}	1	6^{4}
(France) B Bonzi	4	4	7^{7}	6	7^{10}
(France) A Mannarino	6^{3}	6	4	1
22	(Australia) A de Minaur	7^{7}	4	6	6
27	(Bulgaria) G Dimitrov	6	6	6
(Serbia) L Djere	3	2	0
Q	(France) E Couacaud	1	7^{7}	2	0
4	(Serbia) N Djokovic	6	6^{5}	6	6

Third round
(France) B Bonzi	6^{0}	2	1
22	(Australia) A de Minaur	7^{7}	6	6
27	(Bulgaria) G Dimitrov	6^{7}	3	4
4	(Serbia) N Djokovic	7^{9}	6	6

Fourth round
22	(Australia) A de Minaur	2	1	2
4	(Serbia) N Djokovic	6	6	6

==== Section 7 ====
First round
8	(United States) T Fritz	6	6	4	7
(Georgia (country)) N Basilashvili	4	2	6	5
(Chinese Taipei) C-h Tseng	6	6^{5}	7^{7}	6^{4}	1
WC	(Australia) A Popyrin	4	7^{7}	6^{5}	7^{7}	6
(United States) B Shelton	4	6	6	2	7^{10}
(China) Z Zhang	6	3	2	6	6^{4}
Q	(Chile) N Jarry	6	6	7^{7}
26	(Serbia) M Kecmanović	3	4	6^{3}
23	(Argentina) D Schwartzman	6	6^{6}	6	7^{7}
Q	(Ukraine) O Krutykh	4	7^{8}	3	6^{5}
(United States) JJ Wolf	6	3	6	7
(Australia) J Thompson	3	6	4	5
LL	(United States) M Mmoh	4	2	7^{9}	6	6
Q	(France) L Lokoli	6	6	6^{7}	4	2
LL	(Peru) JP Varillas	6	1	7	6^{3}	4
12	(Germany) A Zverev	4	6	5	7^{7}	6

Second round
8	(United States) T Fritz	7^{7}	6^{2}	4	7^{8}	2
WC	(Australia) A Popyrin	6^{4}	7^{7}	6	6^{6}	6
(United States) B Shelton	7^{7}	7^{7}	7
Q	(Chile) N Jarry	6^{3}	6^{3}	5
23	(Argentina) D Schwartzman	1	4	4
(United States) JJ Wolf	6	6	6
LL	(United States) M Mmoh	6^{1}	6	6	6
12	(Germany) A Zverev	7^{7}	4	3	2

Third round
WC	(Australia) A Popyrin	3	6^{4}	4
(United States) B Shelton	6	7^{7}	6
(United States) JJ Wolf	6	6	6
LL	(United States) M Mmoh	4	1	2

Fourth round
(United States) B Shelton	6^{5}	6	6^{4}	7^{7}	6
(United States) JJ Wolf	7^{7}	2	7^{7}	6^{4}	2

==== Section 8 ====
First round
13	(Italy) M Berrettini	3	3	6	7^{9}	6^{6}
(United Kingdom) A Murray	6	6	4	6^{7}	7^{10}
(Australia) T Kokkinakis	6	6	6
(Italy) F Fognini	1	2	2
Q	(Australia) A Vukic	4	6	3	6	3
Q	(United States) B Holt	6	1	6	3	6
(Portugal) J Sousa	3	2	2
24	(Spain) R Bautista Agut	6	6	6
30	(Spain) A Davidovich Fokina	6	6^{3}	3	6	6
(Kazakhstan) A Bublik	0	7^{7}	6	4	3
Q	(Germany) J-L Struff	1	6^{6}	2
(United States) T Paul	6	7^{8}	6
(Australia) C O'Connell	6	2	3	2
(United States) J Brooksby	3	6	6	6
(Czech Republic) T Macháč	3	6^{6}	7^{7}	3
2	(Norway) C Ruud	6	7^{8}	6^{5}	6

Second round
(United Kingdom) A Murray	4	6^{4}	7^{7}	6	7
(Australia) T Kokkinakis	6	7^{7}	6^{5}	3	5
Q	(United States) B Holt	6	6	3	2	2
24	(Spain) R Bautista Agut	4	2	6	6	6
30	(Spain) A Davidovich Fokina	2	6	7^{7}	3	4
(United States) T Paul	6	2	6^{4}	6	6
(United States) J Brooksby	6	7	6^{4}	6
2	(Norway) C Ruud	3	5	7^{7}	2

Third round
(United Kingdom) A Murray	1	7^{9}	3	4
24	(Spain) R Bautista Agut	6	6^{7}	6	6
(United States) T Paul	6	6	6
(United States) J Brooksby	1	4	3

Fourth round
24	(Spain) R Bautista Agut	2	6	2	5
(United States) T Paul	6	4	6	7

== Seeded players ==
The following are the seeded players. Seedings are based on ATP rankings as of 9 January 2023. Rankings and points before are as of 16 January 2023.

Seed	Rank	Player	Points before	Points defending	Points won	Points after	Status
1	2	(Spain) Rafael Nadal	5,770	2,000	45	3,815	Second round lost to (United States) Mackenzie McDonald
2	3	(Norway) Casper Ruud	5,720	0	45	5,765	Second round lost to (United States) Jenson Brooksby
3	4	(Greece) Stefanos Tsitsipas	5,715	720	1,200	6,195	Runner-up, lost to (Serbia) Novak Djokovic [4]
4	5	(Serbia) Novak Djokovic	5,070	0	2,000	7,070	Champion, defeated (Greece) Stefanos Tsitsipas [3]
5	6	Andrey Rublev	3,930	90	360	4,200	Quarterfinals lost to (Serbia) Novak Djokovic [4]
6	7	(Canada) Félix Auger-Aliassime	3,895	360	180	3,715	Fourth round lost to (Czech Republic) Jiří Lehečka
7	8	Daniil Medvedev	3,860	1,200	90	2,745	Third round lost to (United States) Sebastian Korda [29]
8	9	(United States) Taylor Fritz	3,545	180	45	3,410	Second round lost to (Australia) Alexei Popyrin (WC)
9	10	(Denmark) Holger Rune	2,876	10	180	3,046	Fourth round lost to Andrey Rublev [5]
10	11	(Poland) Hubert Hurkacz	2,860	45	180	2,995	Fourth round lost to (United States) Sebastian Korda [29]
11	12	(United Kingdom) Cameron Norrie	2,680	10	90	2,760	Third round lost to (Czech Republic) Jiří Lehečka
12	13	(Germany) Alexander Zverev	2,560	180	45	2,425	Second round lost to (United States) Michael Mmoh (LL)
13	14	(Italy) Matteo Berrettini	2,490	720	10	1,780	First round lost to (United Kingdom) Andy Murray
14	15	(Spain) Pablo Carreño Busta	2,420	180	45	2,285	Second round lost to (France) Benjamin Bonzi
15	16	(Italy) Jannik Sinner	2,375	360	180	2,195	Fourth round lost to (Greece) Stefanos Tsitsipas [3]
16	17	(United States) Frances Tiafoe	2,260	45	90	2,305	Third round lost to Karen Khachanov [18]
17	19	(Italy) Lorenzo Musetti	1,925	10	10	1,925	First round lost to (South Africa) Lloyd Harris (PR)
18	20	Karen Khachanov	1,885	90	720	2,515	Semifinals lost to (Greece) Stefanos Tsitsipas [3]
~~19~~	~~21~~	(Australia) ~~Nick Kyrgios~~	1,870	45	0	1,825	Withdrew due to knee injury
20	22	(Canada) Denis Shapovalov	1,830	360	90	1,560	Third round lost to (Poland) Hubert Hurkacz [10]
21	23	(Croatia) Borna Ćorić	1,760	0	10	1,770	First round lost to (Czech Republic) Jiří Lehečka
22	24	(Australia) Alex de Minaur	1,710	180	180	1,710	Fourth round lost to (Serbia) Novak Djokovic [4]
23	26	(Argentina) Diego Schwartzman	1,550	45	45	1,550	Second round lost to (United States) J. J. Wolf
24	25	(Spain) Roberto Bautista Agut	1,675	90	180	1,765	Fourth round lost to (United States) Tommy Paul
25	30	(United Kingdom) Dan Evans	1,380	90	90	1,380	Third round lost to Andrey Rublev [5]
26	27	(Serbia) Miomir Kecmanović	1,445	180	10	1,275	First round lost to (Chile) Nicolás Jarry (Q)
27	28	(Bulgaria) Grigor Dimitrov	1,395	45	90	1,440	Third round lost to (Serbia) Novak Djokovic [4]
28	29	(Argentina) Francisco Cerúndolo	1,383	16+80^{†}	90+0	1,377	Third round lost to (Canada) Félix Auger-Aliassime [6]
29	31	(United States) Sebastian Korda	1,325	90	360	1,595	Quarterfinals lost to Karen Khachanov [18]
30	32	(Spain) Alejandro Davidovich Fokina	1,325	45	45	1,325	Second round lost to (United States) Tommy Paul
31	33	(Japan) Yoshihito Nishioka	1,212	10+80	180+0	1,302	Fourth round lost to Karen Khachanov [18]
32	34	(Netherlands) Botic van de Zandschulp	1,205	90	45	1,160	Second round lost to (Netherlands) Tallon Griekspoor

† The player did not qualify for the main draw in 2022. He is defending points from two 2022 ATP Challenger Tour tournaments (Concepción and Santa Cruz) instead.

=== Withdrawn players ===
The following players would have been seeded, but withdrew before the tournament began.

Rank	Player	Points before	Points defending	Points after	Withdrawal reason
1	(Spain) Carlos Alcaraz	6,820	90	6,730	Right leg injury
18	(Croatia) Marin Čilić	1,970	180	1,790	Right knee injury

== Other entry information ==
=== Wild cards ===
- (United States) Christopher Eubanks (Note: Ben Shelton was the original winner for the US Wildcard Playoff Challenge, however, he got a direct entry at the tournament. Accordingly, the wild card was given to the runner-up Christopher Eubanks.)
- (Australia) Rinky Hijikata
- (Australia) Jason Kubler
- (Australia) John Millman
- (Australia) Alexei Popyrin
- (Austria) Dominic Thiem
- (France) Luca Van Assche
- (China) Wu Yibing

=== Protected ranking ===
- (Switzerland) Stan Wawrinka (22)
- (South Africa) Lloyd Harris (47)
- (United Kingdom) Kyle Edmund (48)
- (Bolivia) Hugo Dellien (73)
- (Argentina) Guido Pella (75)
- (France) Jérémy Chardy (88)

=== Qualifiers ===
- (Italy) Mattia Bellucci
- (Belgium) Zizou Bergs
- (France) Enzo Couacaud
- (Mexico) Ernesto Escobedo
- (Germany) Yannick Hanfmann
- (United States) Brandon Holt
- (Chinese Taipei) Hsu Yu-hsiou
- (Chile) Nicolás Jarry
- (Ukraine) Oleksii Krutykh
- (France) Laurent Lokoli
- (Australia) Max Purcell
- (China) Shang Juncheng
- (Germany) Jan-Lennard Struff
- (Czech Republic) Dalibor Svrčina
- (Australia) Aleksandar Vukic
- (Japan) Yosuke Watanuki

=== Lucky losers ===
- Pavel Kotov
- (United States) Denis Kudla
- (United States) Michael Mmoh
- (Peru) Juan Pablo Varillas

=== Withdrawals ===
The entry list was released by Tennis Australia based on the ATP rankings for the week of 5 December 2022.

- ‡ (France) Gaël Monfils (52) → replaced by (Portugal) Nuno Borges (99)
- ‡ (Poland) Kamil Majchrzak (77) → replaced by (Canada) Vasek Pospisil (100)
- ‡ (United States) Reilly Opelka (38) → replaced by (China) Zhang Zhizhen (101) (Note: Last direct acceptance)
- ‡ (Spain) Carlos Alcaraz (1) → replaced by (Hungary) Attila Balázs (101 PR) (Note: Balázs had initially replaced Alcaraz, but later withdrew due to recurring injuries.)
- ‡ (Hungary) Attila Balázs (101 PR) → replaced by Pavel Kotov (LL)
- ‡ (Croatia) Marin Čilić (17) → replaced by (Peru) Juan Pablo Varillas (LL)
- § (Australia) Nick Kyrgios (22) → replaced by (United States) Denis Kudla (LL)
- § (Belgium) David Goffin (53) → replaced by (United States) Michael Mmoh (LL)

‡ – withdrew from entry list
§ – withdrew from main draw

== See also ==
- 2023 Australian Open – Day-by-day summaries
- 2023 ATP Tour
- 2023 ITF Men's World Tennis Tour
- List of Grand Slam men's singles champions
- International Tennis Federation

== Notes ==
Preceded by 2022 US Open – Men's singles	Grand Slam men's singles	Succeeded by 2023 French Open – Men's singles
