= 2023 Australian Open – Women's singles =

Women's singles
- 2023 Australian Open

Final
- Champion: Aryna Sabalenka
- Runner-up: (Kazakhstan) Elena Rybakina
- Score: 4–6, 6–3, 6–4

Details
- Draw: 128
- Seeds: 32

Events
Singles	men	women		boys	girls
Doubles	men	women	mixed	boys	girls
WC Singles	men	women	quad	boys	girls
WC Doubles	men	women	quad	boys	girls
- Australian Open

Aryna Sabalenka defeated Elena Rybakina in the final, 4–6, 6–3, 6–4 to win the women's singles tennis title at the 2023 Australian Open. It was her first major singles title. By reaching the final, Rybakina made her debut in the top ten of the WTA rankings, making her the first Kazakhstani, male or female, to do so.

Ashleigh Barty was the reigning champion, but she retired from professional tennis in March 2022. Barty's retirement and Angelique Kerber and Naomi Osaka’s absences (both due to pregnancy) meant that Victoria Azarenka and Sofia Kenin were the only former champions left in the draw. They met in the first round, with Azarenka winning.

Jeļena Ostapenko became the first Latvian to reach the Australian Open quarterfinals.

This tournament marked the final major appearance of former world No. 1 and two-time major champion Garbiñe Muguruza; she lost in the first round to Elise Mertens. Muguruza later announced her retirement from professional tennis the following year.

== Seeds ==
1. (Poland) Iga Świątek (fourth round)
2. (Tunisia) Ons Jabeur (second round)
3. (United States) Jessica Pegula (quarterfinals)
4. (France) Caroline Garcia (fourth round)
5. (Note: On 1 March 2022, the WTA announced that players from Russia and Belarus will not be allowed to compete under the name or flag of Russia or Belarus following the 2022 Russian invasion of Ukraine.)Aryna Sabalenka (champion)
6. (Greece) Maria Sakkari (third round)
7. (United States) Coco Gauff (fourth round)
8. Daria Kasatkina (first round)
9. Veronika Kudermetova (second round)
10. (United States) Madison Keys (third round)
11. (Spain) Paula Badosa (withdrew)
12. (Switzerland) Belinda Bencic (fourth round)
13. (United States) Danielle Collins (third round)
14. (Brazil) Beatriz Haddad Maia (first round)
15. (Czech Republic) Petra Kvitová (second round)
16. (Estonia) Anett Kontaveit (second round)

17. (Latvia) Jeļena Ostapenko (quarterfinals)
18. Liudmila Samsonova (second round)
19. Ekaterina Alexandrova (third round)
20. (Czech Republic) Barbora Krejčíková (fourth round)
21. (Italy) Martina Trevisan (first round)
22. (Kazakhstan) Elena Rybakina (final)
23. (China) Zhang Shuai (fourth round)
24. Victoria Azarenka (semifinals)
25. (Czech Republic) Marie Bouzková (first round)
26. (Belgium) Elise Mertens (third round)
27. (Romania) Irina-Camelia Begu (second round)
28. (United States) Amanda Anisimova (first round)
29. (China) Zheng Qinwen (second round)
30. (Czech Republic) Karolína Plíšková (quarterfinals)
31. (Estonia) Kaia Kanepi (first round)
32. (Switzerland) Jil Teichmann (second round)

Click on the seed number of a player to go to their draw section.

== Draw ==
Key

- Q = Qualifier
- WC = Wild card
- LL = Lucky loser
- Alt = Alternate
- ITF = ITF entry
- PR = Protected ranking
- SR = Special ranking
- SE = Special exempt
- JE = Junior exempt
- JR = Junior Accelerator Programme entrant
- CO = College Accelerator Programme entrant
- NG = Next Gen Accelerator Program entrant
- w/o = Walkover
- r = Retired
- d = Defaulted

=== Finals ===
Quarterfinals
22	(Kazakhstan) Elena Rybakina	6	6
17	(Latvia) Jeļena Ostapenko	2	4
3	(United States) Jessica Pegula	4	1
24	Victoria Azarenka	6	6
30	(Czech Republic) Karolína Plíšková	3	5
(Poland) Magda Linette	6	7
5	Aryna Sabalenka	6	6
(Croatia) Donna Vekić	3	2

Semifinals
22	(Kazakhstan) Elena Rybakina	7^{7}	6
24	Victoria Azarenka	6^{4}	3
(Poland) Magda Linette	6^{1}	2
5	Aryna Sabalenka	7^{7}	6

Final
22	(Kazakhstan) Elena Rybakina	6	3	4
5	Aryna Sabalenka	4	6	6

=== Top half ===
==== Section 1 ====
First round
1	(Poland) I Świątek	6	7
(Germany) J Niemeier	4	5
(Hungary) P Udvardy	4	1
(Colombia) C Osorio	6	6
Q	(Spain) C Bucșa	2	6	6
Q	(Germany) E Lys	6	0	2
(Canada) B Andreescu	6	6
25	(Czech Republic) M Bouzková	2	4
22	(Kazakhstan) E Rybakina	7	6
(Italy) E Cocciaretto	5	3
(Slovenia) K Juvan	7	6
Q	(France) S Janicijevic	5	1
Q	(Ukraine) L Tsurenko	2	1
PR	(Czech Republic) K Muchová	6	6
A Kalinskaya	5	7	4
13	(United States) D Collins	7	5	6

Second round
1	(Poland) I Świątek	6	6
(Colombia) C Osorio	2	3
Q	(Spain) C Bucșa	2	7^{9}	6
(Canada) B Andreescu	6	6^{7}	4
22	(Kazakhstan) E Rybakina	6	6
(Slovenia) K Juvan	2	1
PR	(Czech Republic) K Muchová	7^{7}	2	6^{6}
13	(United States) D Collins	6^{1}	6	7^{10}

Third round
1	(Poland) I Świątek	6	6
Q	(Spain) C Bucșa	0	1
22	(Kazakhstan) E Rybakina	6	5	6
13	(United States) D Collins	2	7	2

Fourth round
1	(Poland) I Świątek	4	4
22	(Kazakhstan) E Rybakina	6	6

==== Section 2 ====
First round
LL	(Brazil) L Pigossi	5	1
(United States) C McNally	7	6
K Rakhimova	5	7^{10}	1
(Ukraine) K Baindl	7	6^{8}	6
(Hungary) A Bondár	6	2	6
(Romania) A Bogdan	2	6	3
(Ukraine) D Yastremska	4	2
17	(Latvia) J Ostapenko	6	6
29	(China) Q Zheng	6	6
(Hungary) D Gálfi	0	2
(United States) B Pera	2	6	6
WC	(Japan) M Uchijima	6	3	1
(United Kingdom) E Raducanu	6	6
(Germany) T Korpatsch	3	2
(Czech Republic) K Siniaková	1	4
7	(United States) C Gauff	6	6

Second round
(United States) C McNally	1	6^{4}
(Ukraine) K Baindl	6	7^{7}
(Hungary) A Bondár	6^{5}	7	0
17	(Latvia) J Ostapenko	7^{7}	5	6
29	(China) Q Zheng	4	4
(United States) B Pera	6	6
(United Kingdom) E Raducanu	3	6^{4}
7	(United States) C Gauff	6	7^{7}

Third round
(Ukraine) K Baindl	3	0
17	(Latvia) J Ostapenko	6	6
(United States) B Pera	3	2
7	(United States) C Gauff	6	6

Fourth round
17	(Latvia) J Ostapenko	7	6
7	(United States) C Gauff	5	3

==== Section 3 ====
First round
3	(United States) J Pegula	6	6
PR	(Romania) J Cristian	0	1
Q	(Czech Republic) B Fruhvirtová	5	2
A Sasnovich	7	6
Q	P Kudermetova	5	1
WC	(Australia) O Gadecki	7	6
(Ukraine) M Kostyuk	6	6
28	(United States) A Anisimova	3	4
20	(Czech Republic) B Krejčíková	6	6
Q	(Czech Republic) S Bejlek	3	1
WC	(Australia) T Gibson	3	4
Q	(France) C Burel	6	6
Q	(United States) C Vandeweghe	3	1
(Ukraine) A Kalinina	6	6
(Belgium) A Van Uytvanck	6^{3}	2
15	(Czech Republic) P Kvitová	7^{7}	6

Second round
3	(United States) J Pegula	6	7^{7}
A Sasnovich	2	6^{5}
WC	(Australia) O Gadecki	2	1
(Ukraine) M Kostyuk	6	6
20	(Czech Republic) B Krejčíková	6	6
Q	(France) C Burel	4	1
(Ukraine) A Kalinina	7	6
15	(Czech Republic) P Kvitová	5	4

Third round
3	(United States) J Pegula	6	6
(Ukraine) M Kostyuk	0	2
20	(Czech Republic) B Krejčíková	6	6
(Ukraine) A Kalinina	2	3

Fourth round
3	(United States) J Pegula	7	6
20	(Czech Republic) B Krejčíková	5	2

==== Section 4 ====
First round
10	(United States) M Keys	6	3	6
A Blinkova	4	6	2
(China) Xin Wang	7^{7}	6
WC	(Australia) S Hunter	6^{2}	4
LL	(France) L Jeanjean	0	3
PR	(Argentina) N Podoroska	6	6
PR	(United States) S Kenin	4	6^{3}
24	V Azarenka	6	7^{7}
32	(Switzerland) J Teichmann	7	6
(United Kingdom) H Dart	5	1
(China) L Zhu	6	6
(Canada) R Marino	2	4
PR	(Slovakia) K Kučová	6^{6}	5
Q	D Shnaider	7^{8}	7
(China) Y Yuan	1	4
6	(Greece) M Sakkari	6	6

Second round
10	(United States) M Keys	6	6
(China) Xin Wang	3	2
PR	(Argentina) N Podoroska	1	0
24	V Azarenka	6	6
32	(Switzerland) J Teichmann	2	2
(China) L Zhu	6	6
Q	D Shnaider	6	5	3
6	(Greece) M Sakkari	3	7	6

Third round
10	(United States) M Keys	6	2	1
24	V Azarenka	1	6	6
(China) L Zhu	7^{7}	1	6
6	(Greece) M Sakkari	6^{3}	6	4

Fourth round
24	V Azarenka	4	6	6
(China) L Zhu	6	1	4

=== Bottom half ===
==== Section 5 ====
First round
8	D Kasatkina	1	1
V Gracheva	6	6
Q	(Italy) L Stefanini	3	7	6
(Germany) T Maria	6	5	4
(Romania) S Cîrstea	6	4	3
(Kazakhstan) Y Putintseva	2	6	6
(China) Xiy Wang	1	3
30	(Czech Republic) Ka Plíšková	6	6
23	(China) S Zhang	6	4	6
PR	(Romania) PM Țig	1	6	0
(Croatia) P Martić	6	6
(Switzerland) V Golubic	3	4
Q	(United States) K Volynets	6	6
PR	E Rodina	3	2
(Belgium) M Zanevska	2	6^{4}
9	V Kudermetova	6	7^{7}

Second round
V Gracheva	6	6
Q	(Italy) L Stefanini	3	1
(Kazakhstan) Y Putintseva	0	5
30	(Czech Republic) Ka Plíšková	6	7
23	(China) S Zhang	6	6
(Croatia) P Martić	3	3
Q	(United States) K Volynets	6	2	6
9	V Kudermetova	4	6	2

Third round
V Gracheva	4	2
30	(Czech Republic) Ka Plíšková	6	6
23	(China) S Zhang	6	6
Q	(United States) K Volynets	3	2

Fourth round
30	(Czech Republic) Ka Plíšková	6	6
23	(China) S Zhang	0	4

==== Section 6 ====
First round
16	(Estonia) A Kontaveit	6	6
(Austria) J Grabher	2	3
(Egypt) M Sherif	5	1
(Poland) M Linette	7	6
WC	(France) D Parry	1	1
WC	(United States) T Townsend	6	6
(Belgium) Y Bonaventure	2	1
19	E Alexandrova	6	6
27	(Romania) I-C Begu	3	7^{7}	6
LL	(United States) E Mandlik	6	6^{1}	2
(Italy) L Bronzetti	6	4	3
PR	(Germany) L Siegemund	2	6	6
(Canada) L Fernandez	7	6
(France) A Cornet	5	2
Q	(Canada) K Sebov	3	0
4	(France) C Garcia	6	6

Second round
16	(Estonia) A Kontaveit	6	3	4
(Poland) M Linette	3	6	6
WC	(United States) T Townsend	6	2	3
19	E Alexandrova	1	6	6
27	(Romania) I-C Begu	7	5	3
PR	(Germany) L Siegemund	5	7	6
(Canada) L Fernandez	6^{5}	5
4	(France) C Garcia	7^{7}	7

Third round
(Poland) M Linette	6	6
19	E Alexandrova	3	4
PR	(Germany) L Siegemund	6	3	3
4	(France) C Garcia	1	6	6

Fourth round
(Poland) M Linette	7^{7}	6
4	(France) C Garcia	6^{3}	4

==== Section 7 ====
First round
5	A Sabalenka	6	6
(Czech Republic) T Martincová	1	4
Q	(Netherlands) A Hartono	4	3
(United States) S Rogers	6	6
(United States) L Davis	1	7	6
(Montenegro) D Kovinić	6	5	1
(Spain) G Muguruza	6	6^{3}	1
26	(Belgium) E Mertens	3	7^{7}	6
21	(Italy) M Trevisan	3	2
Q	(Slovakia) AK Schmiedlová	6	6
PR	A Pavlyuchenkova	0	1
(Italy) C Giorgi	6	6
(United States) C Liu	6	6
(United States) M Brengle	3	4
(Bulgaria) V Tomova	1	2
12	(Switzerland) B Bencic	6	6

Second round
5	A Sabalenka	6	6
(United States) S Rogers	3	1
(United States) L Davis	4	3
26	(Belgium) E Mertens	6	6
Q	(Slovakia) AK Schmiedlová	4	3
(Italy) C Giorgi	6	6
(United States) C Liu	6^{3}	3
12	(Switzerland) B Bencic	7^{7}	6

Third round
5	A Sabalenka	6	6
26	(Belgium) E Mertens	2	3
(Italy) C Giorgi	2	5
12	(Switzerland) B Bencic	6	7

Fourth round
5	A Sabalenka	7	6
12	(Switzerland) B Bencic	5	2

==== Section 8 ====
First round
14	(Brazil) B Haddad Maia	6^{11}	2
(Spain) N Párrizas Díaz	7^{13}	6
(United States) S Stephens	6^{2}	4
A Potapova	7^{7}	6
(Croatia) D Vekić	6	2	7^{10}
Q	O Selekhmeteva	2	6	6^{7}
(Italy) J Paolini	2	4
18	L Samsonova	6	6
31	(Estonia) K Kanepi	6	6^{4}	1
WC	(Australia) K Birrell	3	7^{7}	6
(Czech Republic) L Fruhvirtová	6	6
WC	(Australia) J Fourlis	0	4
(United States) A Riske-Amritraj	7	1	4
PR	(Czech Republic) M Vondroušová	5	6	6
(Slovenia) T Zidanšek	6^{8}	6	1
2	(Tunisia) O Jabeur	7^{10}	4	6

Second round
(Spain) N Párrizas Díaz	6	6
A Potapova	3	2
(Croatia) D Vekić	6	6
18	L Samsonova	3	0
WC	(Australia) K Birrell	3	2
(Czech Republic) L Fruhvirtová	6	6
PR	(Czech Republic) M Vondroušová	6	5	6
2	(Tunisia) O Jabeur	1	7	1

Third round
(Spain) N Párrizas Díaz	2	2
(Croatia) D Vekić	6	6
(Czech Republic) L Fruhvirtová	7	2	6
PR	(Czech Republic) M Vondroušová	5	6	3

Fourth round
(Croatia) D Vekić	6	1	6
(Czech Republic) L Fruhvirtová	2	6	3

== Championship match statistics ==
Category	Sabalenka	(Kazakhstan) Rybakina
1st serve %	70/108 (65%)	62/105 (59%)
1st serve points won	50 of 70 = 71%	44 of 62 = 71%
2nd serve points won	18 of 38 = 47%	19 of 43 = 44%
Total service points won	68 of 108 = 62.96%	63 of 105 = 60.00%
Aces	17	9
Double faults	7	1
Winners	51	31
Unforced errors	28	25
Net points won	7 of 8 = 88%	9 of 12 = 75%
Break points converted	3 of 13 = 23%	2 of 7 = 29%
Return points won	42 of 105 = 40%	40 of 108 = 37%
Total points won	110	103

== Seeded players ==
The following are the seeded players. Seedings are based on WTA rankings as of 9 January 2023. Rankings and points before are as of 16 January 2023.

Seed	Rank	Player	Points before	Points defending	Points won	Points after	Status
1	1	(Poland) Iga Świątek	11,025	780	240	10,485	Fourth round lost to (Kazakhstan) Elena Rybakina [22]
2	2	(Tunisia) Ons Jabeur	5,140	0	70	5,210	Second round lost to (Czech Republic) Markéta Vondroušová [PR]
3	3	(United States) Jessica Pegula	5,000	430	430	5,000	Quarterfinals lost to Victoria Azarenka [24]
4	4	(France) Caroline Garcia	4,415	10	240	4,645	Fourth round lost to (Poland) Magda Linette
5	5	Aryna Sabalenka	4,340	240	2,000	6,100	Champion, defeated (Kazakhstan) Elena Rybakina [22]
6	6	(Greece) Maria Sakkari	3,921	240	130	3,811	Third round lost to (China) Zhu Lin
7	7	(United States) Coco Gauff	3,762	10	240	3,992	Fourth round lost to (Latvia) Jeļena Ostapenko [17]
8	8	Daria Kasatkina	3,500	130	10	3,380	First round lost to Varvara Gracheva
9	9	Veronika Kudermetova	2,800	130	70	2,740	Second round lost to (United States) Katie Volynets [Q]
10	13	(United States) Madison Keys	2,318	780	130	1,668	Third round lost to Victoria Azarenka [24]
~~11~~	~~16~~	~~(Spain) Paula Badosa~~	2,102	240	0	1,862	Withdrew due to right abductor injury
12	10	(Switzerland) Belinda Bencic	2,735	70	240	2,905	Fourth round lost to Aryna Sabalenka [5]
13	11	(United States) Danielle Collins	2,388	1,300	130	1,218	Third round lost to (Kazakhstan) Elena Rybakina [22]
14	14	(Brazil) Beatriz Haddad Maia	2,255	70	10	2,195	First round lost to (Spain) Nuria Párrizas Díaz
15	15	(Czech Republic) Petra Kvitová	2,221	10	70	2,281	Second round lost to (Ukraine) Anhelina Kalinina
16	19	(Estonia) Anett Kontaveit	1,909	70	70	1,909	Second round lost to (Poland) Magda Linette
17	17	(Latvia) Jeļena Ostapenko	2,040	130	430	2,340	Quarterfinals lost to (Kazakhstan) Elena Rybakina [22]
18	20	Liudmila Samsonova	1,905	70	70	1,905	Second round lost to (Croatia) Donna Vekić
19	18	Ekaterina Alexandrova	1,910	10	130	2,030	Third round lost to (Poland) Magda Linette
20	23	(Czech Republic) Barbora Krejčíková	1,600	430	240	1,410	Fourth round lost to (United States) Jessica Pegula [3]
21	21	(Italy) Martina Trevisan	1,672	110	10	1,572	First round lost to (Slovakia) Anna Karolína Schmiedlová [Q]
22	25	(Kazakhstan) Elena Rybakina	1,585	70	1,300	2,815	Runner-up, lost to Aryna Sabalenka [5]
23	22	(China) Zhang Shuai	1,600	130	240	1,710	Fourth round lost to (Czech Republic) Karolína Plíšková [30]
24	24	Victoria Azarenka	1,598	240	780	2,138	Semifinals lost to (Kazakhstan) Elena Rybakina [22]
25	26	(Czech Republic) Marie Bouzková	1,581	70	10	1,521	First round lost to (Canada) Bianca Andreescu
26	32	(Belgium) Elise Mertens	1,449	240	130	1,339	Third round lost to Aryna Sabalenka [5]
27	30	(Romania) Irina-Camelia Begu	1,472	70	70	1,472	Second round lost to (Germany) Laura Siegemund [PR]
28	27	(United States) Amanda Anisimova	1,535	240	10	1,305	First round lost to (Ukraine) Marta Kostyuk
29	28	(China) Zheng Qinwen	1,534	110+80	70+1	1,415	Second round lost to (United States) Bernarda Pera
30	31	(Czech Republic) Karolína Plíšková	1,450	0	430	1,880	Quarterfinals lost to (Poland) Magda Linette
31	29	(Estonia) Kaia Kanepi	1,472	430	10	1,052	First round lost to (Australia) Kimberly Birrell [WC]
32	33	(Switzerland) Jil Teichmann	1,429	70	70	1,429	Second round lost to (China) Zhu Lin

=== Withdrawn players ===
The following player would have been seeded, but withdrew before the tournament began.

Rank	Player	Points before	Points defending	Points after	Withdrawal reason
12	(Romania) Simona Halep	2,381	240	2,141	Provisional suspension due to positive doping test

== Other entry information ==
=== Wild cards ===
- (Australia) Kimberly Birrell (Note: Venus Williams was originally chosen to participate as a Wild Card, but she withdrew due to injury sustained in Auckland. She was replaced by Kimberly Birrell, the next highest ranked Australian player outside of the entry list after Priscilla Hon declined to take the spot.)
- (Australia) Jaimee Fourlis
- (Australia) Olivia Gadecki
- (Australia) Talia Gibson
- (Australia) Storm Hunter
- (France) Diane Parry
- (United States) Taylor Townsend (Note: Caty McNally was the original winner for the US Wildcard Playoff Challenge. However, she got a direct entry at the tournament. The first runner-up, Madison Brengle, also got a direct entry. Therefore, the wild card was given to the second runner-up, Taylor Townsend.)
- (Japan) Moyuka Uchijima

=== Protected ranking ===
- (Romania) Jaqueline Cristian (65)
- (United States) Sofia Kenin (4)
- (Slovakia) Kristína Kučová (90)
- (Czech Republic) Karolína Muchová (22)
- Anastasia Pavlyuchenkova (21)
- (Argentina) Nadia Podoroska (39)
- Evgeniya Rodina (73)
- (Germany) Laura Siegemund (57)
- (Romania) Patricia Maria Țig (65)
- (Czech Republic) Markéta Vondroušová (32)
- (China) ~~Zheng Saisai (89)~~

=== Qualifiers ===
- (Czech Republic) Sára Bejlek
- (Spain) Cristina Bucșa
- (France) Clara Burel
- (Czech Republic) Brenda Fruhvirtová
- (Netherlands) Arianne Hartono
- (France) Séléna Janicijevic
- Polina Kudermetova
- (Germany) Eva Lys
- (Slovakia) Anna Karolína Schmiedlová
- (Canada) Katherine Sebov
- Oksana Selekhmeteva
- Diana Shnaider
- (Italy) Lucrezia Stefanini
- (Ukraine) Lesia Tsurenko
- (United States) CoCo Vandeweghe
- (United States) Katie Volynets

=== Lucky losers ===
- (France) Léolia Jeanjean
- (United States) Elizabeth Mandlik
- (Brazil) Laura Pigossi

=== Withdrawals ===
The entry list was released by Tennis Australia based on the WTA rankings for the week of 5 December 2022.

- † (Romania) Simona Halep (10) → replaced by Varvara Gracheva (94)
- † (Australia) Daria Saville (54) → replaced by (Belgium) Ysaline Bonaventure (95)
- ‡ (China) Wang Qiang (91) → replaced by (United Kingdom) Harriet Dart (96)
- ‡ (Spain) Sara Sorribes Tormo (62) → replaced by (Ukraine) Kateryna Baindl (98)
- ‡ (Japan) Naomi Osaka (42) → replaced by (Ukraine) Dayana Yastremska (99) (Note: Last direct acceptance)
- § (Spain) Paula Badosa (13) → replaced by (Brazil) Laura Pigossi (LL)
- § (Australia) Ajla Tomljanović (33) → replaced by (France) Léolia Jeanjean (LL)
- § (China) Zheng Saisai (89 PR) → replaced by (United States) Elizabeth Mandlik (LL)

† – not included on entry list
‡ – withdrew from entry list
§ – withdrew from main draw

== See also ==
- 2023 Australian Open – Day-by-day summaries
- 2023 WTA Tour
- 2023 ITF Women's World Tennis Tour
- International Tennis Federation

== Notes ==
Preceded by 2022 US Open – Women's singles	Grand Slam women's singles	Succeeded by 2023 French Open – Women's singles
