= 2023 Australian Open – Women's doubles =

Women's doubles
- 2023 Australian Open

Final
- Champions: (Czech Republic) Barbora Krejčíková (Czech Republic) Kateřina Siniaková
- Runners-up: (Japan) Shuko Aoyama (Japan) Ena Shibahara
- Score: 6–4, 6–3

Details
- Draw: 64
- Seeds: 16

Events
Singles	men	women		boys	girls
Doubles	men	women	mixed	boys	girls
WC Singles	men	women	quad	boys	girls
WC Doubles	men	women	quad	boys	girls
- Australian Open

Defending champions Barbora Krejčíková and Kateřina Siniaková defeated Shuko Aoyama and Ena Shibahara in the final, 6–4, 6–3 to win the women's doubles tennis title at the 2023 Australian Open. It was their second Australian Open title and seventh major title together, and they extended their winning streak at the majors to 24 matches with the win, dating back to the 2022 Australian Open.

Siniaková retained the WTA No. 1 doubles ranking by reaching the final. Coco Gauff, Veronika Kudermetova, Elise Mertens, Gabriela Dabrowski, Lyudmyla Kichenok, Yang Zhaoxuan, Kristina Mladenovic, Desirae Krawczyk and Demi Schuurs were also vying for the top ranking, but were eliminated from contention during the course of the competition.

This tournament marked the final major appearance of former doubles world No. 1 and three-time women's doubles major champion Sania Mirza. Partnering Anna Danilina, she was defeated in the second round.

== Seeds ==
1. (Czech Republic) Barbora Krejčíková / (Czech Republic) Kateřina Siniaková (champions)
2. (United States) Coco Gauff / (United States) Jessica Pegula (semifinals)
3. (Canada) Gabriela Dabrowski / (Mexico) Giuliana Olmos (third round)
4. (Australia) Storm Hunter / (Belgium) Elise Mertens (quarterfinals)
5. (Ukraine) Lyudmyla Kichenok / (Latvia) Jeļena Ostapenko (first round)
6. (United States) Desirae Krawczyk / (Netherlands) Demi Schuurs (quarterfinals)
7. (Brazil) Beatriz Haddad Maia / (China) Zhang Shuai (second round)
8. (Kazakhstan) Anna Danilina / (India) Sania Mirza (second round)

9. (United States) Nicole Melichar-Martinez / (Australia) Ellen Perez (second round)
10. (Japan) Shuko Aoyama / (Japan) Ena Shibahara (final)
11. (Chinese Taipei) Chan Hao-ching / (China) Yang Zhaoxuan (quarterfinals)
12. (United States) Asia Muhammad / (United States) Taylor Townsend (second round)
13. (Belgium) Kirsten Flipkens / (Germany) Laura Siegemund (first round)
14. (Poland) Alicja Rosolska / (New Zealand) Erin Routliffe (first round)
15. (United States) Caty McNally / (Brazil) Luisa Stefani (withdrew)
16. (Japan) Miyu Kato / (Indonesia) Aldila Sutjiadi (third round)

Click on the seed number of a player to go to their draw section.

== Draw ==
Key

- Q = Qualifier
- WC = Wild card
- LL = Lucky loser
- Alt = Alternate
- ITF = ITF entry
- PR = Protected ranking
- SR = Special ranking
- SE = Special exempt
- JE = Junior exempt
- JR = Junior Accelerator Programme entrant
- CO = College Accelerator Programme entrant
- NG = Next Gen Accelerator Program entrant
- w/o = Walkover
- r = Retired
- d = Defaulted

=== Finals ===
Quarterfinals
1	(Czech Republic) Barbora Krejčíková (Czech Republic) Kateřina Siniaková	6	6
6	(United States) Desirae Krawczyk (Netherlands) Demi Schuurs	2	3
4	(Australia) Storm Hunter (Belgium) Elise Mertens	6^{6}	6	4
(Ukraine) Marta Kostyuk (Romania) Elena-Gabriela Ruse	7^{8}	2	6
10	(Japan) Shuko Aoyama (Japan) Ena Shibahara	6	6
(United States) Caroline Dolehide; Anna Kalinskaya	3	3
11	(Chinese Taipei) Chan Hao-ching (China) Yang Zhaoxuan	1	1
2	(United States) Coco Gauff (United States) Jessica Pegula	6	6

Semifinals
1	(Czech Republic) Barbora Krejčíková (Czech Republic) Kateřina Siniaková	6	6
(Ukraine) Marta Kostyuk (Romania) Elena-Gabriela Ruse	2	2
10	(Japan) Shuko Aoyama (Japan) Ena Shibahara	6	7^{9}
2	(United States) Coco Gauff (United States) Jessica Pegula	2	6^{7}

Final
1	(Czech Republic) Barbora Krejčíková (Czech Republic) Kateřina Siniaková	6	6
10	(Japan) Shuko Aoyama (Japan) Ena Shibahara	4	3

=== Top half ===
==== Section 1 ====
First round
1	(Czech Republic) B Krejčíková (Czech Republic) K Siniaková	6	3	6
(Norway) U Eikeri (United States) C Harrison	2	6	2
(Czech Republic) L Fruhvirtová (United States) A Riske-Amritraj	6^{4}	6	7
(Georgia (country)) N Dzalamidze; A Panova	7^{7}	4	5
(Georgia (country)) O Kalashnikova (United States) A Parks	6	5	6
(Italy) J Paolini (Italy) M Trevisan	3	7	2
WC	(Australia) J Fourlis (Australia) A Sharma	6	6^{6}	4
Alt	(United States) C Liu (United States) S Santamaria	2	7^{8}	6
12	(United States) A Muhammad (United States) T Townsend	6	6
(Argentina) N Podoroska (Egypt) M Sherif	1	2
(Slovakia) T Mihalíková; A Sasnovich	6	1	6
(China) X Han; L Marozava	4	6	3
WC	(Australia) O Gadecki (Australia) P Hon	6	6
(Romania) A Bogdan (Germany) T Maria	4	2
WC	(Australia) P Hule (Australia) Ar Rodionova	1	4
6	(United States) D Krawczyk (Netherlands) D Schuurs	6	6

Second round
1	(Czech Republic) B Krejčíková (Czech Republic) K Siniaková	6	6
(Czech Republic) L Fruhvirtová (United States) A Riske-Amritraj	2	2
(Georgia (country)) O Kalashnikova (United States) A Parks	6	4	6
Alt	(United States) C Liu (United States) S Santamaria	1	6	2
12	(United States) A Muhammad (United States) T Townsend	2	7^{7}	5
(Slovakia) T Mihalíková; A Sasnovich	6	6^{4}	7
WC	(Australia) O Gadecki (Australia) P Hon	2	6	3
6	(United States) D Krawczyk (Netherlands) D Schuurs	6	3	6

Third round
1	(Czech Republic) B Krejčíková (Czech Republic) K Siniaková	6	6
(Georgia (country)) O Kalashnikova (United States) A Parks	0	3
(Slovakia) T Mihalíková; A Sasnovich	3	1
6	(United States) D Krawczyk (Netherlands) D Schuurs	6	6

Quarterfinals
1	(Czech Republic) B Krejčíková (Czech Republic) K Siniaková	6	6
6	(United States) D Krawczyk (Netherlands) D Schuurs	2	3

==== Section 2 ====
First round
4	(Australia) S Hunter (Belgium) E Mertens	2	7^{8}	6
V Kudermetova; L Samsonova	6	6^{6}	1
(Hungary) T Babos (France) K Mladenovic	6	6
(Spain) A Bolsova (Hungary) P Udvardy	2	2
(Romania) J Cristian (Germany) T Korpatsch	4	4
(Switzerland) V Golubic (Romania) M Niculescu	6	6
(Hungary) A Bondár (Belgium) G Minnen	6	6
14	(Poland) A Rosolska (New Zealand) E Routliffe	4	1
9	(United States) N Melichar-Martinez (Australia) E Perez	6	6
E Alexandrova (Germany) V Heisen	2	1
(United States) D Collins (United Kingdom) H Watson	4	2
(Ukraine) M Kostyuk (Romania) E-G Ruse	6	6
(United Kingdom) A Barnett (United Kingdom) O Nicholls	6	3	5
(Czech Republic) M Kolodziejová (Czech Republic) M Vondroušová	3	6	7
PR	(Canada) L Fernandez (United States) B Mattek-Sands	7^{7}	4	3
7	(Brazil) B Haddad Maia (China) S Zhang	6^{5}	6	6

Second round
4	(Australia) S Hunter (Belgium) E Mertens	6	6
(Hungary) T Babos (France) K Mladenovic	3	3
(Switzerland) V Golubic (Romania) M Niculescu	6	6
(Hungary) A Bondár (Belgium) G Minnen	4	1
9	(United States) N Melichar-Martinez (Australia) E Perez	6	6^{7}	0
(Ukraine) M Kostyuk (Romania) E-G Ruse	3	7^{9}	6
(Czech Republic) M Kolodziejová (Czech Republic) M Vondroušová	3	7^{11}	7^{14}
7	(Brazil) B Haddad Maia (China) S Zhang	6	6^{9}	6^{12}

Third round
4	(Australia) S Hunter (Belgium) E Mertens	6	6
(Switzerland) V Golubic (Romania) M Niculescu	2	2
(Ukraine) M Kostyuk (Romania) E-G Ruse	6	6
(Czech Republic) M Kolodziejová (Czech Republic) M Vondroušová	3	4

Quarterfinals
4	(Australia) S Hunter (Belgium) E Mertens	6^{6}	6	4
(Ukraine) M Kostyuk (Romania) E-G Ruse	7^{8}	2	6

=== Bottom half ===
==== Section 3 ====
First round
5	(Ukraine) L Kichenok (Latvia) J Ostapenko	4	4
A Pavlyuchenkova (Kazakhstan) E Rybakina	6	6
(Italy) L Bronzetti (Italy) E Cocciaretto	1	1
PR	(Chinese Taipei) L Chan (Chile) A Guarachi	6	6
WC	(Australia) A Bozovic (Australia) L Cabrera	4	3
(Ukraine) N Kichenok (Belgium) K Zimmermann	6	6
(Poland) M Linette (China) Xiy Wang	5	6	3
10	(Japan) S Aoyama (Japan) E Shibahara	7	3	6
13	(Belgium) K Flipkens (Germany) L Siegemund	6^{2}	4
A Potapova; Y Sizikova	7^{7}	6
(United States) C Dolehide; A Kalinskaya	6	6
A Blinkova (China) L Zhu	3	3
(Switzerland) B Bencic (Switzerland) J Teichmann	6	6
(United States) M Brengle (Canada) R Marino	2	2
(Romania) I-C Begu (United States) S Rogers	6	2	2
3	(Canada) G Dabrowski (Mexico) G Olmos	4	6	6

Second round
A Pavlyuchenkova (Kazakhstan) E Rybakina	6	6
PR	(Chinese Taipei) L Chan (Chile) A Guarachi	1	0
(Ukraine) N Kichenok (Belgium) K Zimmermann	2	2
10	(Japan) S Aoyama (Japan) E Shibahara	6	6
A Potapova; Y Sizikova	0	1
(United States) C Dolehide; A Kalinskaya	6	6
(Switzerland) B Bencic (Switzerland) J Teichmann	6	2	4
3	(Canada) G Dabrowski (Mexico) G Olmos	4	6	6

Third round
A Pavlyuchenkova (Kazakhstan) E Rybakina	2	6^{7}
10	(Japan) S Aoyama (Japan) E Shibahara	6	7^{9}
(United States) C Dolehide; A Kalinskaya	7	6
3	(Canada) G Dabrowski (Mexico) G Olmos	5	2

Quarterfinals
10	(Japan) S Aoyama (Japan) E Shibahara	6	6
(United States) C Dolehide; A Kalinskaya	3	3

==== Section 4 ====
First round
8	(Kazakhstan) A Danilina (India) S Mirza	6	7
(Hungary) D Gálfi (United States) B Pera	2	5
(Japan) E Hozumi (Slovenia) T Zidanšek	6^{4}	3
(Ukraine) A Kalinina (Belgium) A Van Uytvanck	7^{7}	6
(Spain) C Bucșa (Japan) M Ninomiya	6	6
(United States) S Kenin (Kazakhstan) Y Putintseva	2	3
WC	(France) A Cornet (Australia) S Stosur	3	4
11	(Chinese Taipei) H-c Chan (China) Z Yang	6	6
16	(Japan) M Kato (Indonesia) A Sutjiadi	7^{7}	6
(United States) K Christian (Montenegro) D Kovinić	6^{2}	2
(Czech Republic) M Bouzková (Colombia) C Osorio	6	6
(United States) S Chang (United States) A Kulikov	4	2
WC	(Japan) M Uchijima (China) Xin Wang	6	6
WC	(Australia) T Gibson (Australia) O Tjandramulia	3	3
(Czech Republic) T Martincová (Croatia) D Vekić	6^{2}	6	2
2	(United States) C Gauff (United States) J Pegula	7^{7}	3	6

Second round
8	(Kazakhstan) A Danilina (India) S Mirza	4	6	2
(Ukraine) A Kalinina (Belgium) A Van Uytvanck	6	4	6
(Spain) C Bucșa (Japan) M Ninomiya	3	3
11	(Chinese Taipei) H-c Chan (China) Z Yang	6	6
16	(Japan) M Kato (Indonesia) A Sutjiadi	6	6^{4}	6
(Czech Republic) M Bouzková (Colombia) C Osorio	3	7^{7}	3
WC	(Japan) M Uchijima (China) Xin Wang	5	1
2	(United States) C Gauff (United States) J Pegula	7	6

Third round
(Ukraine) A Kalinina (Belgium) A Van Uytvanck	3	5
11	(Chinese Taipei) H-c Chan (China) Z Yang	6	7
16	(Japan) M Kato (Indonesia) A Sutjiadi	4	2
2	(United States) C Gauff (United States) J Pegula	6	6

Quarterfinals
11	(Chinese Taipei) H-c Chan (China) Z Yang	1	1
2	(United States) C Gauff (United States) J Pegula	6	6

== Other entry information ==
=== Wild cards ===
- (Australia) Alexandra Bozovic / (Australia) Lizette Cabrera
- (France) Alizé Cornet / (Australia) Samantha Stosur
- (Australia) Jaimee Fourlis / (Australia) Astra Sharma
- (Australia) Olivia Gadecki / (Australia) Priscilla Hon
- (Australia) Talia Gibson / (Australia) Olivia Tjandramulia
- (Australia) Petra Hule / (Australia) Arina Rodionova
- (Japan) Moyuka Uchijima / (China) Wang Xinyu

=== Protected ranking ===
- (Chinese Taipei) Latisha Chan / (Chile) Alexa Guarachi
- (Canada) Leylah Fernandez / (United States) Bethanie Mattek-Sands

=== Alternates ===
- (United States) Claire Liu / (United States) Sabrina Santamaria

=== Withdrawals ===
- (United States) Caty McNally / (Brazil) Luisa Stefani → replaced by (United States) Claire Liu / (United States) Sabrina Santamaria
