= 2023 Australian Open – Mixed doubles =

Mixed doubles
- 2023 Australian Open

Final
- Champions: (Brazil) Luisa Stefani (Brazil) Rafael Matos
- Runners-up: (India) Sania Mirza (India) Rohan Bopanna
- Score: 7–6^{(7–2)}, 6–2

Details
- Draw: 32
- Seeds: 8

Events
Singles	men	women		boys	girls
Doubles	men	women	mixed	boys	girls
WC Singles	men	women	quad	boys	girls
WC Doubles	men	women	quad	boys	girls
- Australian Open

Luisa Stefani and Rafael Matos defeated Sania Mirza and Rohan Bopanna in the final, 7–6^{(7–2)}, 6–2 to win the mixed doubles tennis title at the 2023 Australian Open. They became the first Brazilian pair to win the title in the Open Era, and Stefani became the first Brazilian woman to win a mixed doubles major title since Maria Bueno at the 1960 French Championships and also the second Brazilian woman in history to win a major title in general. This tournament marked the final major appearance of three-time mixed doubles major champion Mirza.

Kristina Mladenovic and Ivan Dodig were the reigning champions, but Dodig chose not to defend his title. Mladenovic partnered with Juan Sebastián Cabal, but lost in the second round to Maddison Inglis and Jason Kubler.

Desirae Krawczyk attempted to complete the career Grand Slam in mixed doubles, partnered with Neal Skupski, but lost in the semifinals to Mirza and Bopanna.

== Seeds ==
1. (Mexico) Giuliana Olmos / (El Salvador) Marcelo Arévalo (second round)
2. (United States) Jessica Pegula / (United States) Austin Krajicek (first round)
3. (United States) Desirae Krawczyk / (United Kingdom) Neal Skupski (semifinals)
4. (Japan) Ena Shibahara / (Netherlands) Wesley Koolhof (first round)
5. (Netherlands) Demi Schuurs / (Croatia) Nikola Mektić (second round)
6. (Australia) Ellen Perez / (Finland) Harri Heliövaara (withdrew)
7. (Poland) Alicja Rosolska / (Netherlands) Jean-Julien Rojer (first round)
8. (Canada) Gabriela Dabrowski / (Australia) Max Purcell (second round)

== Draw ==
Key

- Q = Qualifier
- WC = Wild card
- LL = Lucky loser
- Alt = Alternate
- ITF = ITF entry
- PR = Protected ranking
- SR = Special ranking
- SE = Special exempt
- JE = Junior exempt
- JR = Junior Accelerator Programme entrant
- CO = College Accelerator Programme entrant
- NG = Next Gen Accelerator Program entrant
- w/o = Walkover
- r = Retired
- d = Defaulted

=== Finals ===
Semifinals
(India) Sania Mirza (India) Rohan Bopanna	7^{7}	6^{5}	[10]
3	(United States) Desirae Krawczyk (United Kingdom) Neal Skupski	6^{5}	7^{7}	[6]
WC	(Australia) Olivia Gadecki (Australia) Marc Polmans	6	4	[9]
(Brazil) Luisa Stefani (Brazil) Rafael Matos	4	6	[11]

Final
(India) Sania Mirza (India) Rohan Bopanna	6^{2}	2
(Brazil) Luisa Stefani (Brazil) Rafael Matos	7^{7}	6

=== Top half ===
First round
1	(Mexico) G Olmos (El Salvador) M Arévalo	6	3	[10]
(Chinese Taipei) L Chan (Monaco) H Nys	2	6	[6]
(Chinese Taipei) H-c Chan (New Zealand) M Venus	2	7^{7}	[6]
(Latvia) J Ostapenko (Spain) D Vega Hernández	6	6^{5}	[10]
WC	(Australia) J Fourlis (Australia) L Saville	5	3
(India) S Mirza (India) R Bopanna	7	6
(United States) N Melichar-Martinez (Netherlands) M Middelkoop	1	4
Alt	(Japan) M Ninomiya (Uruguay) A Behar	6	6
3	(United States) D Krawczyk (United Kingdom) N Skupski	6^{3}	7^{14}	[10]
(Australia) S Hunter (Australia) J Peers	7^{7}	6^{12}	[8]
(China) S Zhang (Netherlands) R Haase	6	6^{6}	[8]
WC	(Australia) A Parnaby (Australia) A Harris	4	7^{8}	[10]
(Belgium) K Flipkens (France) É Roger-Vasselin	2	6	[7]
(United States) T Townsend (United Kingdom) J Murray	6	3	[10]
WC	(Australia) S Stosur (Australia) M Ebden	6	3	[6]
5	(Netherlands) D Schuurs (Croatia) N Mektić	4	6	[10]

Second round
1	(Mexico) G Olmos (El Salvador) M Arévalo	7^{7}	6^{6}	[8]
(Latvia) J Ostapenko (Spain) D Vega Hernández	6^{4}	7^{8}	[10]
(India) S Mirza (India) R Bopanna	6	7^{11}
Alt	(Japan) M Ninomiya (Uruguay) A Behar	4	6^{9}
3	(United States) D Krawczyk (United Kingdom) N Skupski	6	6
WC	(Australia) A Parnaby (Australia) A Harris	2	4
(United States) T Townsend (United Kingdom) J Murray	6^{5}	6	[10]
5	(Netherlands) D Schuurs (Croatia) N Mektić	7^{7}	4	[5]

Quarterfinals
(Latvia) J Ostapenko (Spain) D Vega Hernández
(India) S Mirza (India) R Bopanna	w/o
3	(United States) D Krawczyk (United Kingdom) N Skupski	4	6	[10]
(United States) T Townsend (United Kingdom) J Murray	6	3	[5]

Semifinals
(India) S Mirza (India) R Bopanna	7^{7}	6^{5}	[10]
3	(United States) D Krawczyk (United Kingdom) N Skupski	6^{5}	7^{7}	[6]

=== Bottom half ===
First round
7	(Poland) A Rosolska (Netherlands) J-J Rojer	6^{8}	6	[9]
WC	(Australia) M Inglis (Australia) J Kubler	7^{10}	1	[11]
(Kazakhstan) A Danilina (Kazakhstan) A Nedovyesov	6	6^{5}	[7]
(France) K Mladenovic (Colombia) JS Cabal	2	7^{7}	[10]
WC	(Australia) K Birrell (Australia) R Hijikata	6	7^{7}
(Ukraine) L Kichenok (Ecuador) G Escobar	1	6^{5}
WC	(Australia) O Gadecki (Australia) M Polmans	6	6
4	(Japan) E Shibahara (Netherlands) W Koolhof	2	2
8	(Canada) G Dabrowski (Australia) M Purcell	6	7
(China) Z Yang (Poland) J Zieliński	2	5
WC	(Australia) L Cabrera (Australia) J-P Smith	7	6
(Belgium) K Zimmermann (Germany) T Pütz	5	3
WC	(China) X Han (China) Zh Zhang	2	0
(Brazil) L Stefani (Brazil) R Matos	6	6
(United States) B Mattek-Sands (Croatia) M Pavić	6^{4}	7	[10]
2	(United States) J Pegula (United States) A Krajicek	7^{7}	5	[8]

Second round
WC	(Australia) M Inglis (Australia) J Kubler	6	7
(France) K Mladenovic (Colombia) JS Cabal	4	5
WC	(Australia) K Birrell (Australia) R Hijikata	0	2
WC	(Australia) O Gadecki (Australia) M Polmans	6	6
8	(Canada) G Dabrowski (Australia) M Purcell	6	5	[7]
WC	(Australia) L Cabrera (Australia) J-P Smith	2	7	[10]
(Brazil) L Stefani (Brazil) R Matos	6	6
(United States) B Mattek-Sands (Croatia) M Pavić	4	4

Quarterfinals
WC	(Australia) M Inglis (Australia) J Kubler	3	2
WC	(Australia) O Gadecki (Australia) M Polmans	6	6
WC	(Australia) L Cabrera (Australia) J-P Smith	3	4
(Brazil) L Stefani (Brazil) R Matos	6	6

Semifinals
WC	(Australia) O Gadecki (Australia) M Polmans	6	4	[9]
(Brazil) L Stefani (Brazil) R Matos	4	6	[11]

== Other entry information ==
=== Wild cards ===
- (Australia) Kimberly Birrell / (Australia) Rinky Hijikata
- (Australia) Lizette Cabrera / (Australia) John-Patrick Smith
- (Australia) Jaimee Fourlis / (Australia) Luke Saville
- (Australia) Olivia Gadecki / (Australia) Marc Polmans
- (China) Han Xinyun / (China) Zhang Zhizhen
- (Australia) Maddison Inglis / (Australia) Jason Kubler
- (Australia) Alana Parnaby / (Australia) Andrew Harris
- (Australia) Samantha Stosur / (Australia) Matthew Ebden

=== Alternates ===
- (Japan) Makoto Ninomiya / (Uruguay) Ariel Behar

=== Withdrawals ===
- (Australia) Ellen Perez / (Finland) Harri Heliövaara → replaced by (Japan) Makoto Ninomiya / (Uruguay) Ariel Behar
