= 2023 Australian Open =

Tennis championships

- Date: 16–29 January 2023
- Edition: 111th Open Era (55th)
- Category: Grand Slam
- Draw: 128S / 64D
- Prize money: A$76,500,000
- Surface: Hard (GreenSet)
- Location: Melbourne, Victoria, Australia
- Venue: Melbourne Park

Champions

Men's singles
- (Serbia) Novak Djokovic

Women's singles
- Aryna Sabalenka

Men's doubles
- (Australia) Rinky Hijikata / (Australia) Jason Kubler

Women's doubles
- (Czech Republic) Barbora Krejčíková / (Czech Republic) Kateřina Siniaková

Mixed doubles
- (Brazil) Luisa Stefani / (Brazil) Rafael Matos

Wheelchair men's singles
- (United Kingdom) Alfie Hewett

Wheelchair women's singles
- (Netherlands) Diede de Groot

Wheelchair quad singles
- (Netherlands) Sam Schröder

Wheelchair men's doubles
- (United Kingdom) Alfie Hewett / (United Kingdom) Gordon Reid

Wheelchair women's doubles
- (Netherlands) Diede de Groot / (Netherlands) Aniek van Koot

Wheelchair quad doubles
- (Netherlands) Sam Schröder / (Netherlands) Niels Vink

Boys' singles
- (Belgium) Alexander Blockx

Girls' singles
- Alina Korneeva

Boys' doubles
- (United States) Learner Tien / (United States) Cooper Williams

Girls' doubles
- (Slovakia) Renáta Jamrichová / (Italy) Federica Urgesi
- Australian Open

The 2023 Australian Open was a Grand Slam level tennis tournament held at Melbourne Park, from 16–29 January 2023. It was the 111th edition of the Australian Open, the 55th in the Open Era, and the first major of the year. The tournament consisted of events for professional players in singles, doubles and mixed doubles. Junior and wheelchair players competed in singles and doubles tournaments. During previous years, the tournament's main sponsor was Kia.

Novak Djokovic claimed the men's singles title, his tenth Australian Open title and 22nd major title overall, tying Rafael Nadal's all-time record. Djokovic was allowed to play this year despite remaining unvaccinated from COVID-19 after his three-year ban was lifted. The ban was initially handed to him after he was deported in 2022, as Australia's laws required foreigners to be vaccinated for entering the country when the tournament was played in 2022, but the ban was lifted as the vaccination requirement has been lifted. Nadal was the defending champion, but lost to Mackenzie McDonald in the second round. Aryna Sabalenka won the women's title, her first major singles title. Ashleigh Barty was the reigning champion in the women's singles, but she retired from the sport in March 2022.

Spectators returned to full capacity for the first time since 2020, targeting to exceed 900,000 fans, after capacity restrictions in the last two events due to the COVID-19 pandemic.

To mark the seventieth anniversary of his first singles title in 1953, Ken Rosewall presented the men's singles trophy to the champion. Billie Jean King presented the women's singles trophy, on the fifty-fifth anniversary of her 1968 victory.

With the elimination of world No. 1 Iga Świątek in the fourth round by Elena Rybakina, this became the first edition of the Australian Open in the Open Era to feature neither of the top two singles seeds of either gender in the quarterfinals.

This was the last Australian Open Tennis Championships to be held on an opening Monday and from January 2024, the tournament will begin on a Sunday which will take place on 14 January 2024.

== Singles players ==
- Men's singles

Champion		Runner-up	
(Serbia) Novak Djokovic [4]		(Greece) Stefanos Tsitsipas [3]	
Semifinals out
Karen Khachanov [18]		(United States) Tommy Paul	
Quarterfinals out
(United States) Sebastian Korda [29]	(Czech Republic) Jiří Lehečka	Andrey Rublev [5]	(United States) Ben Shelton
4th round out
(Japan) Yoshihito Nishioka [31]	(Poland) Hubert Hurkacz [10]	(Italy) Jannik Sinner [15]	(Canada) Félix Auger-Aliassime [6]
(Denmark) Holger Rune [9]	(Australia) Alex de Minaur [22]	(United States) J. J. Wolf	(Spain) Roberto Bautista Agut [24]
3rd round out
(United States) Mackenzie McDonald	(United States) Frances Tiafoe [16]	(Canada) Denis Shapovalov [20]	Daniil Medvedev [7]
(Netherlands) Tallon Griekspoor	(Hungary) Márton Fucsovics	(United Kingdom) Cameron Norrie [11]	(Argentina) Francisco Cerúndolo [28]
(United Kingdom) Dan Evans [25]	(France) Ugo Humbert	(France) Benjamin Bonzi	(Bulgaria) Grigor Dimitrov [27]
(Australia) Alexei Popyrin (WC)	(United States) Michael Mmoh (LL)	(United Kingdom) Andy Murray	(United States) Jenson Brooksby
2nd round out
(Spain) Rafael Nadal [1]	(Czech Republic) Dalibor Svrčina (Q)	(Australia) Jason Kubler (WC)	(China) Shang Juncheng (Q)
(Italy) Lorenzo Sonego	(Japan) Taro Daniel	(Japan) Yosuke Watanuki (Q)	(Australia) John Millman (WC)
(Australia) Rinky Hijikata (WC)	(Netherlands) Botic van de Zandschulp [32]	(South Africa) Lloyd Harris (PR)	(Argentina) Tomás Martín Etcheverry
(France) Constant Lestienne	(United States) Christopher Eubanks (WC)	(France) Corentin Moutet	(Slovakia) Alex Molčan
(Finland) Emil Ruusuvuori	(France) Jérémy Chardy (PR)	(United States) Denis Kudla (LL)	(United States) Maxime Cressy
(Spain) Pablo Carreño Busta [14]	(France) Adrian Mannarino	(Serbia) Laslo Đere	(France) Enzo Couacaud (Q)
(United States) Taylor Fritz [8]	(Chile) Nicolás Jarry (Q)	(Argentina) Diego Schwartzman [23]	(Germany) Alexander Zverev [12]
(Australia) Thanasi Kokkinakis	(United States) Brandon Holt (Q)	(Spain) Alejandro Davidovich Fokina [30]	(Norway) Casper Ruud [2]
1st round out
(United Kingdom) Jack Draper	(United States) Brandon Nakashima	(Spain) Jaume Munar	(Sweden) Mikael Ymer
(Spain) Bernabé Zapata Miralles	(Argentina) Sebastián Báez	(Germany) Oscar Otte	(Germany) Daniel Altmaier
(Spain) Pedro Martínez	(Portugal) Nuno Borges	(Mexico) Ernesto Escobedo (Q)	(Serbia) Dušan Lajović
(Chile) Cristian Garín	(France) Arthur Rinderknech	(Switzerland) Marc-Andrea Hüsler	(United States) Marcos Giron
(France) Quentin Halys	(Germany) Yannick Hanfmann (Q)	Pavel Kotov (LL)	Ilya Ivashka
(Italy) Lorenzo Musetti [17]	(Argentina) Federico Coria	(France) Grégoire Barrère	(United Kingdom) Kyle Edmund (PR)
(France) Luca Van Assche (WC)	(Brazil) Thiago Monteiro	(South Korea) Kwon Soon-woo	(Croatia) Borna Ćorić [21]
(Argentina) Guido Pella (PR)	(China) Wu Yibing (WC)	(Switzerland) Stan Wawrinka (PR)	(Canada) Vasek Pospisil
(Austria) Dominic Thiem (WC)	(Australia) Max Purcell (Q)	(Colombia) Daniel Elahi Galán	(Argentina) Facundo Bagnis
Roman Safiullin	(France) Richard Gasquet	(Spain) Albert Ramos Viñolas	(Serbia) Filip Krajinović
(Argentina) Pedro Cachin	(Italy) Mattia Bellucci (Q)	(United States) John Isner	(Chinese Taipei) Hsu Yu-hsiou (Q)
Aslan Karatsev	(Belgium) Zizou Bergs (Q)	(Bolivia) Hugo Dellien (PR)	(Spain) Roberto Carballés Baena
(Georgia (country)) Nikoloz Basilashvili	(Chinese Taipei) Tseng Chun-hsin	(China) Zhang Zhizhen	(Serbia) Miomir Kecmanović [26]
(Ukraine) Oleksii Krutykh (Q)	(Australia) Jordan Thompson	(France) Laurent Lokoli (Q)	(Peru) Juan Pablo Varillas (LL)
(Italy) Matteo Berrettini [13]	(Italy) Fabio Fognini	(Australia) Aleksandar Vukic (Q)	(Portugal) João Sousa
(Kazakhstan) Alexander Bublik	(Germany) Jan-Lennard Struff (Q)	(Australia) Christopher O'Connell	(Czech Republic) Tomáš Macháč

- Women's singles

Champion		Runner-up	
Aryna Sabalenka [5]		(Kazakhstan) Elena Rybakina [22]	
Semifinals out
Victoria Azarenka [24]		(Poland) Magda Linette	
Quarterfinals out
(Latvia) Jeļena Ostapenko [17]	(United States) Jessica Pegula [3]	(Czech Republic) Karolína Plíšková [30]	(Croatia) Donna Vekić
4th round out
(Poland) Iga Świątek [1]	(United States) Coco Gauff [7]	(Czech Republic) Barbora Krejčíková [20]	(China) Zhu Lin
(China) Zhang Shuai [23]	(France) Caroline Garcia [4]	(Switzerland) Belinda Bencic [12]	(Czech Republic) Linda Fruhvirtová
3rd round out
(Spain) Cristina Bucșa (Q)	(United States) Danielle Collins [13]	(Ukraine) Kateryna Baindl	(United States) Bernarda Pera
(Ukraine) Marta Kostyuk	(Ukraine) Anhelina Kalinina	(United States) Madison Keys [10]	(Greece) Maria Sakkari [6]
Varvara Gracheva	(United States) Katie Volynets (Q)	Ekaterina Alexandrova [19]	(Germany) Laura Siegemund (PR)
(Belgium) Elise Mertens [26]	(Italy) Camila Giorgi	(Spain) Nuria Párrizas Díaz	(Czech Republic) Markéta Vondroušová (PR)
2nd round out
(Colombia) Camila Osorio	(Canada) Bianca Andreescu	(Slovenia) Kaja Juvan	(Czech Republic) Karolína Muchová (PR)
(United States) Caty McNally	(Hungary) Anna Bondár	(China) Zheng Qinwen [29]	(United Kingdom) Emma Raducanu
Aliaksandra Sasnovich	(Australia) Olivia Gadecki (WC)	(France) Clara Burel (Q)	(Czech Republic) Petra Kvitová [15]
(China) Wang Xinyu	(Argentina) Nadia Podoroska (PR)	(Switzerland) Jil Teichmann [32]	Diana Shnaider (Q)
(Italy) Lucrezia Stefanini (Q)	(Kazakhstan) Yulia Putintseva	(Croatia) Petra Martić	Veronika Kudermetova [9]
(Estonia) Anett Kontaveit [16]	(United States) Taylor Townsend (WC)	(Romania) Irina-Camelia Begu [27]	(Canada) Leylah Fernandez
(United States) Shelby Rogers	(United States) Lauren Davis	(Slovakia) Anna Karolína Schmiedlová (Q)	(United States) Claire Liu
Anastasia Potapova	Liudmila Samsonova [18]	(Australia) Kimberly Birrell (WC)	(Tunisia) Ons Jabeur [2]
1st round out
(Germany) Jule Niemeier	(Hungary) Panna Udvardy	(Germany) Eva Lys (Q)	(Czech Republic) Marie Bouzková [25]
(Italy) Elisabetta Cocciaretto	(France) Séléna Janicijevic (Q)	(Ukraine) Lesia Tsurenko (Q)	Anna Kalinskaya
(Brazil) Laura Pigossi (LL)	Kamilla Rakhimova	(Romania) Ana Bogdan	(Ukraine) Dayana Yastremska
(Hungary) Dalma Gálfi	(Japan) Moyuka Uchijima (WC)	(Germany) Tamara Korpatsch	(Czech Republic) Kateřina Siniaková
(Romania) Jaqueline Cristian (PR)	(Czech Republic) Brenda Fruhvirtová (Q)	Polina Kudermetova (Q)	(United States) Amanda Anisimova [28]
(Czech Republic) Sára Bejlek (Q)	(Australia) Talia Gibson (WC)	(United States) CoCo Vandeweghe (Q)	(Belgium) Alison Van Uytvanck
Anna Blinkova	(Australia) Storm Hunter (WC)	(France) Léolia Jeanjean (LL)	(United States) Sofia Kenin (PR)
(United Kingdom) Harriet Dart	(Canada) Rebecca Marino	(Slovakia) Kristína Kučová (PR)	(China) Yuan Yue
Daria Kasatkina [8]	(Germany) Tatjana Maria	(Romania) Sorana Cîrstea	(China) Wang Xiyu
(Romania) Patricia Maria Țig (PR)	(Switzerland) Viktorija Golubic	Evgeniya Rodina (PR)	(Belgium) Maryna Zanevska
(Austria) Julia Grabher	(Egypt) Mayar Sherif	(France) Diane Parry (WC)	(Belgium) Ysaline Bonaventure
(United States) Elizabeth Mandlik (LL)	(Italy) Lucia Bronzetti	(France) Alizé Cornet	(Canada) Katherine Sebov (Q)
(Czech Republic) Tereza Martincová	(Netherlands) Arianne Hartono (Q)	(Montenegro) Danka Kovinić	(Spain) Garbiñe Muguruza
(Italy) Martina Trevisan [21]	Anastasia Pavlyuchenkova (PR)	(United States) Madison Brengle	(Bulgaria) Viktoriya Tomova
(Brazil) Beatriz Haddad Maia [14]	(United States) Sloane Stephens	Oksana Selekhmeteva (Q)	(Italy) Jasmine Paolini
(Estonia) Kaia Kanepi [31]	(Australia) Jaimee Fourlis (WC)	(United States) Alison Riske-Amritraj	(Slovenia) Tamara Zidanšek

== Events ==
=== Men's singles ===
- (Serbia) Novak Djokovic def. (Greece) Stefanos Tsitsipas, 6–3, 7–6^{(7–4)}, 7–6^{(7–5)}

=== Women's singles ===
- Aryna Sabalenka def. (Kazakhstan) Elena Rybakina, 4–6, 6–3, 6–4

=== Men's doubles ===
- (Australia) Rinky Hijikata / (Australia) Jason Kubler def. (Monaco) Hugo Nys / (Poland) Jan Zieliński, 6–4, 7–6^{(7–4)}

=== Women's doubles ===
- (Czech Republic) Barbora Krejčíková / (Czech Republic) Kateřina Siniaková def. (Japan) Shuko Aoyama / (Japan) Ena Shibahara, 6–4, 6–3

=== Mixed doubles ===
- (Brazil) Luisa Stefani / (Brazil) Rafael Matos def. (India) Sania Mirza / (India) Rohan Bopanna, 7–6^{(7–2)}, 6–2

=== Wheelchair men's singles ===
- (United Kingdom) Alfie Hewett def. (Japan) Tokito Oda, 6–3, 6–1

=== Wheelchair women's singles ===
- (Netherlands) Diede de Groot def. (Japan) Yui Kamiji, 0–6, 6–2, 6–2

=== Wheelchair quad singles ===
- (Netherlands) Sam Schröder def. (Netherlands) Niels Vink, 6–2, 7–5

=== Wheelchair men's doubles ===
- (United Kingdom) Alfie Hewett / (United Kingdom) Gordon Reid def. (Netherlands) Maikel Scheffers / (Netherlands) Ruben Spaargaren, 6–1, 6–2

=== Wheelchair women's doubles ===
- (Netherlands) Diede de Groot / (Netherlands) Aniek van Koot def. (Japan) Yui Kamiji / (China) Zhu Zhenzhen, 6–3, 6–2

=== Wheelchair quad doubles ===
- (Netherlands) Sam Schröder / (Netherlands) Niels Vink def. (South Africa) Donald Ramphadi / (Brazil) Ymanitu Silva, 6–1, 6–3

=== Boys' singles ===
- (Belgium) Alexander Blockx def. (United States) Learner Tien, 6–1, 2–6, 7–6^{(11–9)}

=== Girls' singles ===
- Alina Korneeva def. Mirra Andreeva, 6–7^{(2–7)}, 6–4, 7–5

=== Boys' doubles ===
- (United States) Learner Tien / (United States) Cooper Williams def. (Belgium) Alexander Blockx / (Brazil) João Fonseca, 6–4, 6–4

=== Girls' doubles ===
- (Slovakia) Renáta Jamrichová / (Italy) Federica Urgesi def. (Japan) Hayu Kinoshita / (Japan) Sara Saito, 7–6^{(7–5)}, 1–6, [10–7]

== Point distribution and prize money ==
=== Point distribution ===
Below is a series of tables for each competition showing the ranking points offered for each event.

==== Senior points ====
Event	W	F	SF	QF	Round of 16	Round of 32	Round of 64	Round of 128	Q	Q3	Q2	Q1
Men's singles	2000	1200	720	360	180	90	45	10	25	16	8	0
Men's doubles	2000	1200	720	360	180	90	0	N/A				
Women's singles	2000	1300	780	430	240	130	70	10	40	30	20	2
Women's doubles	2000	1300	780	430	240	130	10	N/A				

==== Wheelchair points ====
Event	W	F	SF/3rd	QF/4th
Singles	800	500	375	100
Doubles	800	500	100	N/A
Quad singles	800	500	100	N/A
Quad doubles	800	100	N/A	N/A

==== Junior points ====
Event	W	F	SF	QF	Round of 16	Round of 32	Q	Q3
Boys' singles	375	270	180	120	75	30	25	20
Girls' singles	375	270	180	120	75	30	25	20
Boys' doubles	270	180	120	75	45	N/A		
Girls' doubles	270	180	120	75	45	N/A		

=== Prize money ===
The Australian Open total prize money for 2023 increased by 3.38% year on year to a tournament record A$76,500,000. This represented a 155% increase in prize money over the last ten years, from the A$30 million on offer in 2013.

Event	W	F	SF	QF	Round of 16	Round of 32	Round of 64	Round of 128	Q3	Q2	Q1
Singles	A$2,975,000	A$1,625,000	A$925,000	A$555,250	A$338,250	A$227,925	A$158,850	A$106,250	A$55,150	A$36,575	A$26,000
Doubles	A$695,000	A$370,000	A$210,000	A$116,500	A$67,250	A$46,500	A$30,975	N/A			
Mixed doubles	A$157,750	A$89,450	A$47,500	A$25,250	A$12,650	A$6,600	N/A				
Wheelchair singles	A$	A$	A$	A$	N/A						
Wheelchair doubles	A$	A$	A$	N/A	N/A						
Quad singles	A$	A$	A$	N/A	N/A						
Quad doubles	A$	A$	N/A	N/A	N/A						

== Exhibition events ==
=== Australian Padel Open ===
Padel Australia has also been supported by Tennis Australia which aims to grow its popularity. At the 2022 Australian Open Tennis Grand Slam tournament a pop-up padel court was erected for public access and exhibition games, while in 2023 the first "Australian Padel Open" was held alongside the Australian Open tennis near to the tennis centre court at Rod Laver Arena.

== Controversy ==
In the wake of the 2022 Russian invasion of Ukraine, organizers from the tournament banned Russian and Belarusian flags from being displayed courtside. Nations' flags were initially allowed, but this was reversed after an incident between Russia's Kamilla Rakhimova and Ukraine's Kateryna Baindl. During the game, Russian supporters were accused of taunting Baindl, but the group denied that they were being provocative. They stated that they were merely supporting Rakhimova.

The move came after Russian and Belarusian players were banned from playing under their nation's flags.

Preceded by 2022 US Open	Grand Slams	Succeeded by 2023 French Open
