= 2023 Australian Open – Men's doubles =

Men's doubles
- 2023 Australian Open

Final
- Champions: (Australia) Rinky Hijikata (Australia) Jason Kubler
- Runners-up: (Monaco) Hugo Nys (Poland) Jan Zieliński
- Score: 6–4, 7–6^{(7–4)}

Details
- Draw: 64
- Seeds: 16

Events
Singles	men	women		boys	girls
Doubles	men	women	mixed	boys	girls
WC Singles	men	women	quad	boys	girls
WC Doubles	men	women	quad	boys	girls
- Australian Open

Rinky Hijikata and Jason Kubler defeated Hugo Nys and Jan Zieliński in the final, 6–4, 7–6^{(7–4)} to win the men's doubles tennis title at the 2023 Australian Open. Awarded a wildcard into the tournament, Hijikata and Kubler saved a match point en route to the title, in their third round match against Tomislav Brkić and Gonzalo Escobar. Nys became the first ever Monegasque player to reach the semifinal and final of a major.

Thanasi Kokkinakis and Nick Kyrgios were the reigning champions, but the pair withdrew due to Kyrgios' knee injury.

Wesley Koolhof and Neal Skupski reclaimed the ATP No. 1 doubles ranking courtesy of making the quarterfinals and other contenders losing in the earlier rounds. Rajeev Ram, Mate Pavić, Marcelo Arévalo and Jean-Julien Rojer were also in contention for the top ranking at the beginning of the tournament.

Rojer was vying to complete the Career Grand Slam in men's doubles, but lost in the quarterfinals to Jérémy Chardy and Fabrice Martin, partnering Arévalo.

== Seeds ==
1. (Netherlands) Wesley Koolhof / (United Kingdom) Neal Skupski (quarterfinals)
2. (United States) Rajeev Ram / (United Kingdom) Joe Salisbury (third round)
3. (El Salvador) Marcelo Arévalo / (Netherlands) Jean-Julien Rojer (quarterfinals)
4. (Croatia) Nikola Mektić / (Croatia) Mate Pavić (second round)
5. (Croatia) Ivan Dodig / (United States) Austin Krajicek (first round)
6. (United Kingdom) Lloyd Glasspool / (Finland) Harri Heliövaara (second round)
7. (Australia) Thanasi Kokkinakis / (Australia) Nick Kyrgios (withdrew)
8. (Spain) Marcel Granollers / (Argentina) Horacio Zeballos (semifinals)

9. (Italy) Simone Bolelli / (Italy) Fabio Fognini (first round)
10. (India) Rohan Bopanna / (Australia) Matthew Ebden (first round)
11. (United Kingdom) Jamie Murray / (New Zealand) Michael Venus (second round)
12. (Colombia) Juan Sebastián Cabal / (Colombia) Robert Farah (third round)
13. (Brazil) Rafael Matos / (Spain) David Vega Hernández (first round)
14. (Germany) Andreas Mies / (Australia) John Peers (quarterfinals)
15. (Mexico) Santiago González / (France) Édouard Roger-Vasselin (second round)
16. (Netherlands) Robin Haase / (Netherlands) Matwé Middelkoop (third round)

Click on the seed number of a player to go to their draw section.

== Draw ==
Key

- Q = Qualifier
- WC = Wild card
- LL = Lucky loser
- Alt = Alternate
- ITF = ITF entry
- PR = Protected ranking
- SR = Special ranking
- SE = Special exempt
- JE = Junior exempt
- JR = Junior Accelerator Programme entrant
- CO = College Accelerator Programme entrant
- NG = Next Gen Accelerator Program entrant
- w/o = Walkover
- r = Retired
- d = Defaulted

=== Finals ===
Quarterfinals
1	(Netherlands) Wesley Koolhof (United Kingdom) Neal Skupski	3	1
WC	(Australia) Rinky Hijikata (Australia) Jason Kubler	6	6
14	(Germany) Andreas Mies (Australia) John Peers	4	7^{7}	2
8	(Spain) Marcel Granollers (Argentina) Horacio Zeballos	6	6^{2}	6
(France) Jérémy Chardy (France) Fabrice Martin	6	2	7^{10}
3	(El Salvador) Marcelo Arévalo (Netherlands) Jean-Julien Rojer	3	6	6^{4}
(France) Benjamin Bonzi (France) Arthur Rinderknech	1	4
(Monaco) Hugo Nys (Poland) Jan Zieliński	6	6

Semifinals
WC	(Australia) Rinky Hijikata (Australia) Jason Kubler	6	6
8	(Spain) Marcel Granollers (Argentina) Horacio Zeballos	4	2
(France) Jérémy Chardy (France) Fabrice Martin	3	7	2
(Monaco) Hugo Nys (Poland) Jan Zieliński	6	5	6

Final
WC	(Australia) Rinky Hijikata (Australia) Jason Kubler	6	7^{7}
(Monaco) Hugo Nys (Poland) Jan Zieliński	4	6^{4}

=== Top half ===
==== Section 1 ====
First round
1	(Netherlands) W Koolhof (United Kingdom) N Skupski	6	6
(Kazakhstan) A Bublik (Australia) J-P Smith	1	2
(India) R Ramanathan (Mexico) MÁ Reyes-Varela	6	5	3
(Greece) Pe Tsitsipas (Greece) S Tsitsipas	3	7	6
(Portugal) F Cabral (Portugal) J Sousa	6	3	4
(Serbia) N Ćaćić (Pakistan) A-u-H Qureshi	4	6	6
A Karatsev (Serbia) D Lajović	4	4
15	(Mexico) S González (France) É Roger-Vasselin	6	6
11	(United Kingdom) J Murray (New Zealand) M Venus	6	6
Alt	(United States) H Reese (Colombia) C Rodríguez	4	2
Alt	(Serbia) I Sabanov (Serbia) M Sabanov	6	6^{3}	4
(Bosnia and Herzegovina) T Brkić (Ecuador) G Escobar	1	7^{7}	6
(Mexico) H Hach Verdugo (United States) J Isner	6^{6}	4
WC	(Australia) R Hijikata (Australia) J Kubler	7^{8}	6
(United States) N Lammons (United States) J Withrow	6^{3}	3
6	(United Kingdom) L Glasspool (Finland) H Heliövaara	7^{7}	6

Second round
1	(Netherlands) W Koolhof (United Kingdom) N Skupski	7^{8}	4	7^{10}
(Greece) Pe Tsitsipas (Greece) S Tsitsipas	6^{6}	6	6^{7}
(Serbia) N Ćaćić (Pakistan) A-u-H Qureshi	7^{7}	7^{7}
15	(Mexico) S González (France) É Roger-Vasselin	6^{1}	6^{4}
11	(United Kingdom) J Murray (New Zealand) M Venus	6^{5}	4
(Bosnia and Herzegovina) T Brkić (Ecuador) G Escobar	7^{7}	6
WC	(Australia) R Hijikata (Australia) J Kubler	3	7	6
6	(United Kingdom) L Glasspool (Finland) H Heliövaara	6	5	2

Third round
1	(Netherlands) W Koolhof (United Kingdom) N Skupski	6	6
(Serbia) N Ćaćić (Pakistan) A-u-H Qureshi	4	2
(Bosnia and Herzegovina) T Brkić (Ecuador) G Escobar	6	6^{8}	4
WC	(Australia) R Hijikata (Australia) J Kubler	1	7^{10}	6

Quarterfinals
1	(Netherlands) W Koolhof (United Kingdom) N Skupski	3	1
WC	(Australia) R Hijikata (Australia) J Kubler	6	6

==== Section 2 ====
First round
4	(Croatia) N Mektić (Croatia) M Pavić	6	7
(Argentina) M González (Argentina) A Molteni	2	5
(Argentina) F Coria (Argentina) D Schwartzman	2	4
WC	(Australia) A Bolt (Australia) L Saville	6	6
(France) Q Halys (France) A Mannarino	4	4
(Sweden) A Göransson (Switzerland) M-A Hüsler	6	6
WC	(India) Y Bhambri (India) S Myneni	6^{5}	7^{7}	3
14	(Germany) A Mies (Australia) J Peers	7^{7}	6^{4}	6
9	(Italy) S Bolelli (Italy) F Fognini	3	3
(France) S Doumbia (France) F Reboul	6	6
(South Africa) L Harris (South Africa) R Klaasen	7^{7}	7^{11}
(Spain) P Martínez (Brazil) T Monteiro	6^{5}	6^{9}
(Brazil) M Demoliner (Italy) A Vavassori	6^{5}	7^{7}	7^{10}
(Belgium) S Gillé (Belgium) J Vliegen	7^{7}	6^{4}	6^{4}
(Argentina) S Báez (Venezuela) LD Martínez	4	2
8	(Spain) M Granollers (Argentina) H Zeballos	6	6

Second round
4	(Croatia) N Mektić (Croatia) M Pavić	5	3
WC	(Australia) A Bolt (Australia) L Saville	7	6
(Sweden) A Göransson (Switzerland) M-A Hüsler	4	6^{5}
14	(Germany) A Mies (Australia) J Peers	6	7^{7}
(France) S Doumbia (France) F Reboul	4	4
(South Africa) L Harris (South Africa) R Klaasen	6	6
(Brazil) M Demoliner (Italy) A Vavassori	6	6^{5}	2
8	(Spain) M Granollers (Argentina) H Zeballos	3	7^{7}	6

Third round
WC	(Australia) A Bolt (Australia) L Saville	0	3
14	(Germany) A Mies (Australia) J Peers	6	6
(South Africa) L Harris (South Africa) R Klaasen	1	6^{4}
8	(Spain) M Granollers (Argentina) H Zeballos	6	7^{7}

Quarterfinals
14	(Germany) A Mies (Australia) J Peers	4	7^{7}	2
8	(Spain) M Granollers (Argentina) H Zeballos	6	6^{2}	6

=== Bottom half ===
==== Section 3 ====
First round
5	(Croatia) I Dodig (United States) A Krajicek	6^{6}	6	4
Alt	(India) S Balaji (India) J Nedunchezhiyan	7^{8}	2	6
(United States) M Cressy (France) A Olivetti	6^{3}	4
(France) J Chardy (France) F Martin	7^{7}	6
(Argentina) F Cerúndolo (Argentina) TM Etcheverry	4	6^{5}
(Czech Republic) J Lehečka (Slovakia) A Molčan	6	7^{7}
(Austria) A Erler (Austria) L Miedler	6	7
10	(India) R Bopanna (Australia) M Ebden	3	5
16	(Netherlands) R Haase (Netherlands) M Middelkoop	7	7
(Spain) R Carballés Baena (Bolivia) H Dellien	5	5
(Argentina) P Cachin (Argentina) G Pella	4	3
(United Kingdom) J Cash (United Kingdom) H Patten	6	6
(Spain) A Ramos Viñolas (Spain) B Zapata Miralles	4	1
(Japan) B McLachlan (Japan) Y Nishioka	6	6
(Ecuador) D Hidalgo (Finland) E Ruusuvuori	1	6^{1}
3	(El Salvador) M Arévalo (Netherlands) J-J Rojer	6	7^{7}

Second round
Alt	(India) S Balaji (India) J Nedunchezhiyan	4	4
(France) J Chardy (France) F Martin	6	6
(Czech Republic) J Lehečka (Slovakia) A Molčan	7	7
(Austria) A Erler (Austria) L Miedler	5	5
16	(Netherlands) R Haase (Netherlands) M Middelkoop	6	7^{8}
(United Kingdom) J Cash (United Kingdom) H Patten	4	6^{6}
(Japan) B McLachlan (Japan) Y Nishioka	6^{3}	4
3	(El Salvador) M Arévalo (Netherlands) J-J Rojer	7^{7}	6

Third round
(France) J Chardy (France) F Martin	7^{7}	6
(Czech Republic) J Lehečka (Slovakia) A Molčan	6^{2}	3
16	(Netherlands) R Haase (Netherlands) M Middelkoop	3	6^{6}
3	(El Salvador) M Arévalo (Netherlands) J-J Rojer	6	7^{8}

Quarterfinals
(France) J Chardy (France) F Martin	6	2	7^{10}
3	(El Salvador) M Arévalo (Netherlands) J-J Rojer	3	6	6^{4}

==== Section 4 ====
First round
(France) N Mahut (Germany) T Pütz	3	6	3
(Colombia) N Barrientos (Uruguay) A Behar	6	3	6
(France) B Bonzi (France) A Rinderknech	6	7^{7}
WC	(Australia) J Millman (Australia) A Vukic	2	6^{3}
(Kazakhstan) A Golubev (Kazakhstan) A Nedovyesov	6	6
WC	(Australia) D Sweeny (Australia) L Tu	0	2
Alt	(Germany) D Altmaier (Peru) JP Varillas	4	7^{8}	1
12	(Colombia) JS Cabal (Colombia) R Farah	6	6^{6}	6
13	(Brazil) R Matos (Spain) D Vega Hernández	7^{7}	4	4
(Monaco) H Nys (Poland) J Zieliński	6^{4}	6	6
(Australia) M Purcell (Australia) J Thompson	6	6
(Argentina) G Durán (Austria) P Oswald	3	4
WC	(Australia) M Polmans (Australia) A Popyrin	6	6
Alt	(Argentina) F Bagnis (United States) R Galloway	4	3
(United States) M Giron (France) C Lestienne	2	3
2	(United States) R Ram (United Kingdom) J Salisbury	6	6

Second round
(Colombia) N Barrientos (Uruguay) A Behar	7^{7}	3	6^{2}
(France) B Bonzi (France) A Rinderknech	6^{5}	6	7^{10}
(Kazakhstan) A Golubev (Kazakhstan) A Nedovyesov	6	3	1
12	(Colombia) JS Cabal (Colombia) R Farah	4	6	6
(Monaco) H Nys (Poland) J Zieliński	4	6	7^{10}
(Australia) M Purcell (Australia) J Thompson	6	4	6^{7}
WC	(Australia) M Polmans (Australia) A Popyrin	6^{6}	6	3
2	(United States) R Ram (United Kingdom) J Salisbury	7^{8}	4	6

Third round
(France) B Bonzi (France) A Rinderknech	7^{7}	6^{6}	6
12	(Colombia) JS Cabal (Colombia) R Farah	6^{5}	7^{8}	2
(Monaco) H Nys (Poland) J Zieliński	6^{4}	7^{8}	6
2	(United States) R Ram (United Kingdom) J Salisbury	7^{7}	6^{6}	2

Quarterfinals
(France) B Bonzi (France) A Rinderknech	1	4
(Monaco) H Nys (Poland) J Zieliński	6	6

== Other entry information ==
=== Wild cards ===
- (India) Yuki Bhambri / (India) Saketh Myneni
- (Australia) Alex Bolt / (Australia) Luke Saville
- (Australia) Rinky Hijikata / (Australia) Jason Kubler (champions)
- ~~(United States) Mackenzie McDonald / (Brazil) Marcelo Melo~~
- (Australia) John Millman / (Australia) Aleksandar Vukic
- (Australia) Marc Polmans / (Australia) Alexei Popyrin
- (Australia) Dane Sweeny / (Australia) Li Tu

=== Alternates ===
- (Germany) Daniel Altmaier / (Peru) Juan Pablo Varillas
- (Argentina) Facundo Bagnis / (United States) Robert Galloway
- (India) Sriram Balaji / (India) Jeevan Nedunchezhiyan
- (United States) Hunter Reese / (Colombia) Cristian Rodríguez
- (Serbia) Ivan Sabanov / (Serbia) Matej Sabanov

=== Withdrawals ===
- (Serbia) Laslo Đere / (Serbia) Filip Krajinović → replaced by (Germany) Daniel Altmaier / (Peru) Juan Pablo Varillas
- (Colombia) Daniel Elahi Galán / (Brazil) Thiago Monteiro → replaced by (Spain) Pedro Martínez / (Brazil) Thiago Monteiro
- Ilya Ivashka / (Germany) Oscar Otte → replaced by (Serbia) Ivan Sabanov / (Serbia) Matej Sabanov
- (Serbia) Miomir Kecmanović / (South Korea) Kwon Soon-woo → replaced by (Argentina) Facundo Bagnis / (United States) Robert Galloway
- (Australia) Thanasi Kokkinakis / (Australia) Nick Kyrgios → replaced by (United States) Hunter Reese / (Colombia) Cristian Rodríguez
- (United States) Mackenzie McDonald / (Brazil) Marcelo Melo → replaced by (India) Sriram Balaji / (India) Jeevan Nedunchezhiyan
