= 2021 French Open – Day-by-day summaries =

The 2021 French Open's order of play for main draw matches on the three main tennis courts, starting from May 30 until June 13.

All dates are in CEST.

== Day 1 (30 May) ==
- Seeds out:
  - Men's Singles: (Austria) Dominic Thiem [4], (Bulgaria) Grigor Dimitrov [16], (Poland) Hubert Hurkacz [19], (United Kingdom) Dan Evans [25]
  - Women's Singles: (Germany) Angelique Kerber [26]
- Schedule of play

Matches on main courts
Matches on Court Philippe Chatrier (Center Court)
Event	Winner	Loser	Score
Women's Singles 1st Round	(Japan) Naomi Osaka [2]	(Romania) Patricia Maria Țig	6–4, 7–6^{(7–4)}
Men's Singles 1st Round	(Spain) Pablo Andújar	(Austria) Dominic Thiem [4]	4–6, 5–7, 6–3, 6–4, 6–4
Women's Singles 1st Round	(Belarus) Victoria Azarenka [15]	(Russia) Svetlana Kuznetsova	6–4, 2–6, 6–3
Men's Singles 1st Round	(Greece) Stefanos Tsitsipas [5]	(France) Jérémy Chardy	7–6^{(8–6)}, 6–3, 6–1
Matches on Court Suzanne Lenglen (Grandstand)
Event	Winner	Loser	Score
Men's Singles 1st Round	(Italy) Fabio Fognini [27]	(France) Grégoire Barrère [WC]	6–4, 6–1, 6–4
Women's Singles 1st Round	(Czech Republic) Petra Kvitová [11]	(Belgium) Greet Minnen [Q]	6–7^{(3–7)}, 7–6^{(7–5)}, 6–1
Women's Singles 1st Round	(Belarus) Aryna Sabalenka [3]	(Croatia) Ana Konjuh [Q]	6–4, 6–3
Men's Singles 1st Round	(Germany) Alexander Zverev [6]	(Germany) Oscar Otte	3–6, 3–6, 6–2, 6–2, 6–0
Matches on Court Simonne Mathieu
Event	Winner	Loser	Score
Women's Singles 1st Round	(Montenegro) Danka Kovinić	(France) Clara Burel [WC]	6–3, 7–6^{(10–8)}
Men's Singles 1st Round	(Hungary) Márton Fucsovics	(France) Gilles Simon	6–4, 6–1, 7–6^{(7–5)}
Men's Singles 1st Round	(Serbia) Laslo Đere	(France) Corentin Moutet	6–3, 6–7^{(10–12)}, 7–6^{(7–2)}, 7–5
Women's Singles 1st Round	(United States) Madison Keys [23]	(France) Océane Dodin [WC]	6–3, 3–6, 6–1
Day matches began at 11 am CEST

== Day 2 (31 May) ==
- Seeds out:
  - Men's Singles: (Belgium) David Goffin [13], (Italy) Lorenzo Sonego [26]
  - Women's Singles: (Canada) Bianca Andreescu [6], (Spain) Garbiñe Muguruza [12], (Netherlands) Kiki Bertens [16], (United Kingdom) Johanna Konta [19], (Croatia) Petra Martić [22]
- Schedule of play

Matches on main courts
Matches on Court Philippe Chatrier (Center Court)
Event	Winner	Loser	Score
Women's Singles 1st Round	(Poland) Iga Świątek [8]	(Slovenia) Kaja Juvan	6–0, 7–5
Men's Singles 1st Round	(Russia) Daniil Medvedev [2]	(Kazakhstan) Alexander Bublik	6–3, 6–3, 7–5
Men's Singles 1st Round	(Switzerland) Roger Federer [8]	(Uzbekistan) Denis Istomin	6–2, 6–4, 6–3
Women's Singles 1st Round	(United States) Serena Williams [7]	(Romania) Irina-Camelia Begu	7–6^{(8–6)}, 6–2
Matches on Court Suzanne Lenglen (Grandstand)
Event	Winner	Loser	Score
Men's Singles 1st Round	(Italy) Jannik Sinner [18]	(France) Pierre-Hugues Herbert	6–1, 4–6, 6–7^{(4–7)}, 7–5, 6–4
Women's Singles 1st Round	(France) Caroline Garcia	(Germany) Laura Siegemund	6–3, 6–1
Women's Singles 1st Round	(United States) Sofia Kenin [4]	(Latvia) Jeļena Ostapenko	6–4, 4–6, 6–3
Men's Singles 1st Round	(Japan) Yoshihito Nishioka	(France) Jo-Wilfried Tsonga	6–4, 6–2, 3–6, 7–6^{(7–5)}
Matches on Court Simonne Mathieu
Event	Winner	Loser	Score
Women's Singles 1st Round	(France) Harmony Tan [WC]	(France) Alizé Cornet	6–4, 6–4
Men's Singles 1st Round	(Norway) Casper Ruud [15]	(France) Benoît Paire	5–7, 6–2, 6–1, 7–6^{(7–4)}
Men's Singles 1st Round	(Croatia) Marin Čilić	(France) Arthur Rinderknech [WC]	7–6^{(8–6)}, 6–1, 6–2
Women's Singles 1st Round	(Ukraine) Marta Kostyuk	(Spain) Garbiñe Muguruza [12]	6–1, 6–4
Coloured background indicates a night match
Day matches began at 11 am (12 pm on Court Philippe Chatrier), whilst night match began at 9 pm CEST

== Day 3 (1 June) ==
- Seeds out:
  - Men's Singles: (Russia) Andrey Rublev [7], (Canada) Félix Auger-Aliassime [20], (France) Ugo Humbert [29]
  - Women's Singles: (Japan) Naomi Osaka [2], (Czech Republic) Petra Kvitová [11]
  - Men's Doubles: (Poland) Łukasz Kubot / (Brazil) Marcelo Melo [8], (Finland) Henri Kontinen / (France) Édouard Roger-Vasselin [12]
- Schedule of play

Matches on main courts
Matches on Court Philippe Chatrier (Center Court)
Event	Winner	Loser	Score
Women's Singles 1st Round	(Ukraine) Elina Svitolina [5]	(France) Océane Babel [WC]	6–2, 7–5
Women's Singles 1st Round	(Australia) Ashleigh Barty [1]	(United States) Bernarda Pera	6–4, 3–6, 6–2
Men's Singles 1st Round	(Spain) Rafael Nadal [3]	(Australia) Alexei Popyrin	6–3, 6–2, 7–6^{(7–3)}
Men's Singles 1st Round	(Serbia) Novak Djokovic [1]	(United States) Tennys Sandgren	6–2, 6–4, 6–2
Matches on Court Suzanne Lenglen (Grandstand)
Event	Winner	Loser	Score
Women's Singles 1st Round	(France) Fiona Ferro	(Chinese Taipei) Liang En-shuo [Q]	6–1, 1–6, 6–4
Men's Singles 1st Round	(France) Gaël Monfils [14]	(Spain) Albert Ramos Viñolas	1–6, 7–6^{(8–6)}, 6–4, 6–4
Men's Singles 1st Round	(France) Richard Gasquet	(France) Hugo Gaston [WC]	6–1, 6–4, 6–2
Women's Singles 1st Round	(Czech Republic) Karolína Plíšková [9]	(Croatia) Donna Vekić	7–5, 6–4
Matches on Court Simonne Mathieu
Event	Winner	Loser	Score
Men's Singles 1st Round	(Lithuania) Ričardas Berankis	(France) Ugo Humbert [29]	6–4, 6–4, 2–6, 6–4
Women's Singles 1st Round	(France) Kristina Mladenovic	(Slovakia) Anna Karolína Schmiedlová [Q]	6–4, 6–0
Men's Singles 1st Round	(Italy) Matteo Berrettini [9]	(Japan) Taro Daniel [Q]	6–0, 6–4, 4–6, 6–4
Women's Singles 1st Round	(United States) Sloane Stephens	(Spain) Carla Suárez Navarro	3–6, 7–6^{(7–3)}, 6–4
Coloured background indicates a night match
Day matches began at 11 am (12 pm on Court Philippe Chatrier), whilst night match began at 9 pm CEST

== Day 4 (2 June) ==
- Seeds out:
  - Men's Singles: (Spain) Roberto Bautista Agut [11], (Russia) Karen Khachanov [23]
  - Women's Singles: (Switzerland) Belinda Bencic [10], (Russia) Veronika Kudermetova [29]
  - Men's Doubles: (Croatia) Nikola Mektić / (Croatia) Mate Pavić [1]
  - Women's Doubles: (Chile) Alexa Guarachi / (United States) Desirae Krawczyk [5], (Hungary) Tímea Babos / (Russia) Vera Zvonareva [7]
- Schedule of play

Matches on main courts
Matches on Court Philippe Chatrier (Center Court)
Event	Winner	Loser	Score
Women's Singles 2nd Round	(Czech Republic) Markéta Vondroušová [20]	(France) Harmony Tan [WC]	6–1, 6–3
Men's Singles 2nd Round	(Japan) Kei Nishikori	(Russia) Karen Khachanov [23]	4–6, 6–2, 2–6, 6–4, 6–4
Women's Singles 2nd Round	(United States) Serena Williams [7]	(Romania) Mihaela Buzărnescu [PR]	6–3, 5–7, 6–1
Men's Singles 2nd Round	(Russia) Daniil Medvedev [2]	(United States) Tommy Paul	3–6, 6–1, 6–4, 6–3
Matches on Court Suzanne Lenglen (Grandstand)
Event	Winner	Loser	Score
Men's Singles 2nd Round	(Germany) Alexander Zverev [6]	(Russia) Roman Safiullin [Q]	7–6^{(7–4)}, 6–3, 7–6^{(7–1)}
Women's Singles 2nd Round	(Slovenia) Polona Hercog	(France) Caroline Garcia	7–5, 6–4
Men's Singles 2nd Round	(Greece) Stefanos Tsitsipas [5]	(Spain) Pedro Martínez	6–3, 6–4, 6–3
Women's Singles 2nd Round	(Belarus) Aryna Sabalenka [3]	(Belarus) Aliaksandra Sasnovich	7–5, 6–3
Matches on Court Simonne Mathieu
Event	Winner	Loser	Score
Women's Singles 2nd Round	(Russia) Daria Kasatkina	(Switzerland) Belinda Bencic [10]	6–2, 6–2
Men's Singles 2nd Round	(Switzerland) Henri Laaksonen [Q]	(Spain) Roberto Bautista Agut [11]	6–3, 2–6, 6–3, 6–2
Women's Singles 2nd Round	(Belarus) Victoria Azarenka [15]	(Denmark) Clara Tauson	7–5, 6–4
Men's Singles 2nd Round	(Spain) Pablo Carreño Busta [12]	(France) Enzo Couacaud [WC]	2–6, 6–3, 6–4, 6–4
Coloured background indicates a night match
Day matches began at 11 am (12 pm on Court Philippe Chatrier), whilst night match began at 9 pm CEST

== Day 5 (3 June) ==
- Seeds out:
  - Men's Singles: (France) Gaël Monfils [14], (Australia) Alex de Minaur [21], (Russia) Aslan Karatsev [24], (Georgia (country)) Nikoloz Basilashvili [28], (United States) Taylor Fritz [30]
  - Women's Singles: (Australia) Ashleigh Barty [1], (Czech Republic) Karolína Plíšková [9], (Russia) Ekaterina Alexandrova [32]
  - Men's Doubles: (Spain) Marcel Granollers / (Argentina) Horacio Zeballos [4], (Croatia) Ivan Dodig / (Slovakia) Filip Polášek [5],
    (France) Jérémy Chardy / (France) Fabrice Martin [13], (South Africa) Raven Klaasen / (Japan) Ben McLachlan [15]
- Schedule of play

Matches on main courts
Matches on Court Philippe Chatrier (Center Court)
Event	Winner	Loser	Score
Women's Singles 2nd Round	(Poland) Magda Linette	(Australia) Ashleigh Barty [1]	6–1, 2–2, retired
Women's Singles 2nd Round	(United States) Sloane Stephens	(Czech Republic) Karolína Plíšková [9]	7–5, 6–1
Men's Singles 2nd Round	(Switzerland) Roger Federer [8]	(Croatia) Marin Čilić	6–2, 2–6, 7–6^{(7–4)}, 6–2
Men's Singles 2nd Round	(Spain) Rafael Nadal [3]	(France) Richard Gasquet	6–0, 7–5, 6–2
Matches on Court Suzanne Lenglen (Grandstand)
Event	Winner	Loser	Score
Women's Singles 2nd Round	(Ukraine) Elina Svitolina [5]	(United States) Ann Li	6–0, 6–4
Men's Singles 2nd Round	(Sweden) Mikael Ymer	(France) Gaël Monfils [14]	6–0, 2–6, 6–4, 6–3
Men's Singles 2nd Round	(Serbia) Novak Djokovic [1]	(Uruguay) Pablo Cuevas	6–3, 6–2, 6–4
Women's Singles 2nd Round	(Estonia) Anett Kontaveit [30]	(France) Kristina Mladenovic	6–2, 6–0
Matches on Court Simonne Mathieu
Event	Winner	Loser	Score
Men's Singles 2nd Round	(Italy) Matteo Berrettini [9]	(Argentina) Federico Coria	6–3, 6–3, 6–2
Men's Singles 2nd Round	(Italy) Jannik Sinner [18]	(Italy) Gianluca Mager	6–1, 7–5, 3–6, 6–3
Women's Singles 2nd Round	(United States) Jennifer Brady [13]	(France) Fiona Ferro	6–4, 2–6, 7–5
Women's Singles 2nd Round	(Poland) Iga Świątek [8]	(Sweden) Rebecca Peterson	6–1, 6–1
Coloured background indicates a night match
Day matches began at 11 am (12 pm on Court Philippe Chatrier), whilst night match began at 9 pm CEST

== Day 6 (4 June) ==
- Seeds out:
  - Men's Singles: (Norway) Casper Ruud [15], (Italy) Fabio Fognini [27], (United States) John Isner [31], (United States) Reilly Opelka [32]
  - Women's Singles: (Belarus) Aryna Sabalenka [3], (United States) Madison Keys [23]
  - Men's Doubles: (United States) Rajeev Ram / (United Kingdom) Joe Salisbury [3], (Australia) John Peers / (New Zealand) Michael Venus [10],
    (New Zealand) Marcus Daniell / (Austria) Philipp Oswald [16]
  - Women's Doubles: (China) Xu Yifan / (China) Zhang Shuai [8], (Australia) Ellen Perez / (China) Zheng Saisai [13], (Ukraine) Nadiia Kichenok / (Romania) Raluca Olaru [16]
  - Mixed Doubles: (China) Xu Yifan / (Brazil) Bruno Soares [4]
- Schedule of play

Matches on main courts
Matches on Court Philippe Chatrier (Center Court)
Event	Winner	Loser	Score
Women's Singles 3rd Round	(Belarus) Victoria Azarenka [15]	(United States) Madison Keys [23]	6–2, 6–2
Men's Singles 3rd Round	(Germany) Alexander Zverev [6]	(Serbia) Laslo Đere	6–2, 7–5, 6–2
Women's Singles 3rd Round	(United States) Serena Williams [7]	(United States) Danielle Collins	6–4, 6–4
Men's Singles 3rd Round	(Greece) Stefanos Tsitsipas [5]	(United States) John Isner [31]	5–7, 6–3, 7–6^{(7–3)}, 6–1
Matches on Court Suzanne Lenglen (Grandstand)
Event	Winner	Loser	Score
Women's Singles 3rd Round	(Kazakhstan) Elena Rybakina [21]	(Russia) Elena Vesnina [PR]	6–1, 6–4
Men's Singles 3rd Round	(Argentina) Federico Delbonis	(Italy) Fabio Fognini [27]	6–4, 6–1, 6–3
Men's Singles 3rd Round	(Russia) Daniil Medvedev [2]	(United States) Reilly Opelka [32]	6–4, 6–2, 6–4
Women's Singles 3rd Round	(Czech Republic) Markéta Vondroušová [20]	(Slovenia) Polona Hercog	6–3, 6–3
Matches on Court Simonne Mathieu
Event	Winner	Loser	Score
Women's Singles 3rd Round	(Russia) Anastasia Pavlyuchenkova [31]	(Belarus) Aryna Sabalenka [3]	6–4, 2–6, 6–0
Men's Singles 3rd Round	(Japan) Kei Nishikori	(Switzerland) Henri Laaksonen [Q]	7–5, retired
Men's Singles 3rd Round	(Spain) Pablo Carreño Busta [12]	(United States) Steve Johnson	6–4, 6–4, 6–2
Women's Singles 3rd Round	(Spain) Paula Badosa [33]	(Romania) Ana Bogdan	2–6, 7–6^{(7–4)}, 6–4
Coloured background indicates a night match
Day matches began at 11 am (12 pm on Court Philippe Chatrier), whilst night match began at 9 pm CEST

== Day 7 (5 June) ==
- Seeds out:
  - Women's Singles: (Ukraine) Elina Svitolina [5], (United States) Jennifer Brady [13], (Belgium) Elise Mertens [14], (Czech Republic) Karolína Muchová [18], (United States) Jessica Pegula [28], (Estonia) Anett Kontaveit [30]
  - Men's Doubles: (United Kingdom) Jamie Murray / (Brazil) Bruno Soares [7], (Netherlands) Wesley Koolhof / (Netherlands) Jean-Julien Rojer [11]
  - Women's Doubles: (Japan) Shuko Aoyama / (Japan) Ena Shibahara [4], (Romania) Monica Niculescu / (Latvia) Jeļena Ostapenko [12]
- Schedule of play

Matches on main courts
Matches on Court Philippe Chatrier (Center Court)
Event	Winner	Loser	Score
Women's Singles 3rd Round	(Czech Republic) Barbora Krejčíková	(Ukraine) Elina Svitolina [5]	6–3, 6–2
Men's Singles 3rd Round	(Serbia) Novak Djokovic [1]	(Lithuania) Ričardas Berankis	6–1, 6–4, 6–1
Women's Singles 3rd Round	(Poland) Iga Świątek [8]	(Estonia) Anett Kontaveit [30]	7–6^{(7–4)}, 6–0
Men's Singles 3rd Round	(Switzerland) Roger Federer [8]	(Germany) Dominik Koepfer	7–6,^{(7–5)}, 6–7^{(3–7)}, 7–6^{(7–4)}, 7–5
Matches on Court Suzanne Lenglen (Grandstand)
Event	Winner	Loser	Score
Men's Singles 3rd Round	(Argentina) Diego Schwartzman [10]	(Germany) Philipp Kohlschreiber [PR]	6–4, 6–2, 6–1
Women's Singles 3rd Round	(United States) Sofia Kenin [4]	(United States) Jessica Pegula [28]	4–6, 6–1, 6–4
Men's Singles 3rd Round	(Spain) Rafael Nadal [3]	(United Kingdom) Cameron Norrie	6–3, 6–3, 6–3
Women's Singles 3rd Round	(United States) Coco Gauff [24]	(United States) Jennifer Brady [13]	6–1, retired
Matches on Court Simonne Mathieu
Event	Winner	Loser	Score
Women's Singles 3rd Round	(United States) Sloane Stephens	(Czech Republic) Karolína Muchová [18]	6–3, 7–5
Men's Singles 3rd Round	(Germany) Jan-Lennard Struff	(Spain) Carlos Alcaraz [Q]	6–4, 7–6^{(7–3)}, 6–2
Women's Singles 3rd Round	(Greece) Maria Sakkari [17]	(Belgium) Elise Mertens [14]	7–5, 6–7^{(2–7)}, 6–2
Men's Singles 3rd Round	(Italy) Matteo Berrettini [9]	(South Korea) Kwon Soon-woo	7–6^{(8–6)}, 6–3, 6–4
Coloured background indicates a night match
Day matches began at 11 am (12 pm on Court Philippe Chatrier), whilst night match began at 9 pm CEST

== Day 8 (6 June) ==
- Seeds out:
  - Men's Singles: (Switzerland) Roger Federer [8], (Spain) Pablo Carreño Busta [12], (Chile) Cristian Garín [22]
  - Women's Singles: (United States) Serena Williams [7], (Belarus) Victoria Azarenka [15], (Czech Republic) Markéta Vondroušová [20]
  - Men's Doubles: (Belgium) Sander Gillé / (Belgium) Joran Vliegen [14]
  - Women's Doubles: (Chinese Taipei) Hsieh Su-wei / (Belgium) Elise Mertens [1], (Czech Republic) Lucie Hradecká / (Germany) Laura Siegemund [10]
- Schedule of play

Matches on main courts
Matches on Court Philippe Chatrier (Center Court)
Event	Winner	Loser	Score
Women's Singles 4th Round	(Russia) Anastasia Pavlyuchenkova [31]	(Belarus) Victoria Azarenka [15]	5–7, 6–3, 6–2
Men's Singles 4th Round	(Greece) Stefanos Tsitsipas [5]	(Spain) Pablo Carreño Busta [12]	6–3, 6–2, 7–5
Women's Singles 4th Round	(Kazakhstan) Elena Rybakina [21]	(United States) Serena Williams [7]	6–3, 7–5
Men's Singles 4th Round	(Germany) Alexander Zverev [6]	(Japan) Kei Nishikori	6–4, 6–1, 6–1
Matches on Court Suzanne Lenglen (Grandstand)
Event	Winner	Loser	Score
Women's Singles 4th Round	(Slovenia) Tamara Zidanšek	(Romania) Sorana Cîrstea	7–6^{(7–4)}, 6–1
Women's Singles 4th Round	(Spain) Paula Badosa [33]	(Czech Republic) Markéta Vondroušová [20]	6–4, 3–6, 6–2
Men's Singles 4th Round	(Russia) Daniil Medvedev [2]	(Chile) Cristian Garín [22]	6–2, 6–1, 7–5
Men's Singles 4th Round	(Spain) Alejandro Davidovich Fokina	(Argentina) Federico Delbonis	6–4, 6–4, 4–6, 6–4
Matches on Court Simonne Mathieu
Event	Winner	Loser	Score
Women's Doubles 3rd Round	(Romania) Irina-Camelia Begu (Argentina) Nadia Podoroska	(France) Clara Burel [WC] (France) Chloé Paquet [WC]	6–3, 6–1
Women's Doubles 3rd Round	(United States) Bethanie Mattek-Sands [14] (Poland) Iga Świątek [14]	(Chinese Taipei) Hsieh Su-wei [1] (Belgium) Elise Mertens [1]	5–7, 6–4, 7–5
Men's Doubles 3rd Round	(France) Pierre-Hugues Herbert [6] (France) Nicolas Mahut [6]	(Netherlands) Robin Haase (Germany) Jan-Lennard Struff	0–6, 6–3, 7–6^{(7–5)}
Mixed Doubles Quarterfinals	(Netherlands) Demi Schuurs [3] (Netherlands) Wesley Koolhof [3]	(Chile) Alexa Guarachi (United Kingdom) Neal Skupski	6–4, 3–6, [10–5]
Men's Doubles 3rd Round	(Monaco) Hugo Nys (Germany) Tim Pütz	(Monaco) Romain Arneodo (France) Benoît Paire	6–4, 6–4
Coloured background indicates a night match
Day matches began at 11 am (12 pm on Court Philippe Chatrier), whilst night match began at 9 pm CEST

== Day 9 (7 June) ==
- Seeds out:
  - Men's Singles: (Italy) Jannik Sinner [18]
  - Women's Singles: (United States) Sofia Kenin [4], (Tunisia) Ons Jabeur [25]
  - Women's Doubles: (United States) Nicole Melichar / (Netherlands) Demi Schuurs [3], (Chinese Taipei) Chan Hao-ching / (Chinese Taipei) Latisha Chan [6], (Canada) Sharon Fichman / (Mexico) Giuliana Olmos [9]
  - Mixed Doubles: (Czech Republic) Barbora Krejčíková / (Slovakia) Filip Polášek [1], (United States) Nicole Melichar / (United States) Rajeev Ram [2]
- Schedule of play

Matches on main courts
Matches on Court Philippe Chatrier (Center Court)
Event	Winner	Loser	Score
Women's Singles 4th Round	(United States) Coco Gauff [24]	(Tunisia) Ons Jabeur [25]	6–3, 6–1
Men's Singles 4th Round	(Serbia) Novak Djokovic [1]	(Italy) Lorenzo Musetti	6–7^{(7–9)}, 6–7^{(2–7)}, 6–1, 6–0, 4–0, retired
Men's Singles 4th Round	(Spain) Rafael Nadal [3]	(Italy) Jannik Sinner [18]	7–5, 6–3, 6–0
Women's Singles 4th Round	(Poland) Iga Świątek [8]	(Ukraine) Marta Kostyuk	6–3, 6–4
Matches on Court Suzanne Lenglen (Grandstand)
Event	Winner	Loser	Score
Women's Singles 4th Round	(Czech Republic) Barbora Krejčíková	(United States) Sloane Stephens	6–2, 6–0
Men's Singles 4th Round	(Argentina) Diego Schwartzman [10]	(Germany) Jan-Lennard Struff	7–6^{(11–9)}, 6–4, 7–5
Women's Singles 4th Round	(Greece) Maria Sakkari [17]	(United States) Sofia Kenin [4]	6–1, 6–3
Mixed Doubles Quarterfinals (Note: Originally scheduled to play on Court 14, but the intending plan at Court Suzanne Lenglen was to have a match of Matteo Berrettini versus Roger Federer, in which Federer already withdrew due to scheduling concerns. This match was moved to Court Suzanne Lenglen after the conclusion of Kenin–Sakkari match.)	(Russia) Elena Vesnina [PR] (Russia) Aslan Karatsev [PR]	(United States) Nicole Melichar [2] (United States) Rajeev Ram [2]	6–7^{(3–7)}, 6–2, [10–8]
Matches on Court Simonne Mathieu
Event	Winner	Loser	Score
Women's Doubles 3rd Round	(Croatia) Petra Martić (United States) Shelby Rogers	(Canada) Sharon Fichman [9] (Mexico) Giuliana Olmos [9]	3–6, 6–1, 6–3
Women's Doubles 3rd Round	(Russia) Anastasia Pavlyuchenkova (Kazakhstan) Elena Rybakina	(United States) Nicole Melichar [3] (Netherlands) Demi Schuurs [3]	6–4, 6–3
Mixed Doubles Quarterfinals	(Mexico) Giuliana Olmos (Colombia) Juan Sebastián Cabal	(Czech Republic) Barbora Krejčíková [1] (Slovakia) Filip Polášek [1]	6–2, 5–7, [12–10]
Men's Doubles Quarterfinals	(Kazakhstan) Alexander Bublik (Kazakhstan) Andrey Golubev	(Monaco) Hugo Nys (Germany) Tim Pütz	6–4, 6–4
Coloured background indicates a night match
Day matches began at 11 am (12 pm on Court Philippe Chatrier), whilst night match began at 9 pm CEST

== Day 10 (8 June) ==
- Seeds out:
  - Men's Singles: (Russia) Daniil Medvedev [2]
  - Women's Singles: (Kazakhstan) Elena Rybakina [21], (Spain) Paula Badosa [33]
  - Men's Doubles: (Germany) Kevin Krawietz / (Romania) Horia Tecău [9]
  - Women's Doubles: (Croatia) Darija Jurak / (Slovenia) Andreja Klepač [11]
  - Mixed Doubles: (Netherlands) Demi Schuurs / (Netherlands) Wesley Koolhof [3]
- Schedule of play

Matches on main courts
Matches on Court Philippe Chatrier (Center Court)
Event	Winner	Loser	Score
Women's Singles Quarterfinals	(Slovenia) Tamara Zidanšek	(Spain) Paula Badosa [33]	7–5, 4–6, 8–6
Women's Singles Quarterfinals	(Russia) Anastasia Pavlyuchenkova [31]	(Kazakhstan) Elena Rybakina [21]	6–7^{(2–7)}, 6–2, 9–7
Men's Singles Quarterfinals	(Germany) Alexander Zverev [6]	(Spain) Alejandro Davidovich Fokina	6–4, 6–1, 6–1
Men's Singles Quarterfinals	(Greece) Stefanos Tsitsipas [5]	(Russia) Daniil Medvedev [2]	6–3, 7–6^{(7–3)}, 7–5
Matches on Court Suzanne Lenglen (Grandstand)
Event	Winner	Loser	Score
Men's Doubles Quarterfinals	(Colombia) Juan Sebastián Cabal [2] (Colombia) Robert Farah [2]	(Germany) Kevin Krawietz [9] (Romania) Horia Tecău [9]	6–2, 6–7^{(3–7)}, 7–5
Men's Doubles Quarterfinals	(France) Pierre-Hugues Herbert [6] (France) Nicolas Mahut [6]	(Bosnia and Herzegovina) Tomislav Brkić (Serbia) Nikola Ćaćić	7–6^{(7–5)}, 6–1
Mixed Doubles Semifinals	(United States) Desirae Krawczyk (United Kingdom) Joe Salisbury	(Mexico) Giuliana Olmos (Colombia) Juan Sebastián Cabal	Walkover
Matches on Court Simonne Mathieu
Event	Winner	Loser	Score
Women's Doubles Quarterfinals	(Czech Republic) Barbora Krejčíková [2] (Czech Republic) Kateřina Siniaková [2]	(Czech Republic) Karolína Plíšková (Czech Republic) Kristýna Plíšková	6–4, 6–4
Women's Doubles Quarterfinals	(United States) Bethanie Mattek-Sands [14] (Poland) Iga Świątek [14]	(Croatia) Darija Jurak [11] (Slovenia) Andreja Klepač [11]	6–3, 6–2
Mixed Doubles Semifinals	(Russia) Elena Vesnina (Russia) Aslan Karatsev	(Netherlands) Demi Schuurs [3] (Netherlands) Wesley Koolhof [3]	6–4, 6–1
Coloured background indicates a night match
Day matches began at 11 am (12 pm on Court Philippe Chatrier), whilst night match began at 9 pm CEST

== Day 11 (9 June) ==
- Seeds out:
  - Men's Singles: (Italy) Matteo Berrettini [9], (Argentina) Diego Schwartzman [10]
  - Women's Singles: (Poland) Iga Świątek [8], (United States) Coco Gauff [24]
- Schedule of play

Matches on main courts
Matches on Court Philippe Chatrier (Center Court)
Event	Winner	Loser	Score
Women's Singles Quarterfinals	(Czech Republic) Barbora Krejčíková	(United States) Coco Gauff [24]	7–6^{(8–6)}, 6–3
Women's Singles Quarterfinals	(Greece) Maria Sakkari [17]	(Poland) Iga Świątek [8]	6–4, 6–4
Men's Singles Quarterfinals	(Spain) Rafael Nadal [3]	(Argentina) Diego Schwartzman [10]	6–3, 4–6, 6–4, 6–0
Men's Singles Quarterfinals	(Serbia) Novak Djokovic [1]	(Italy) Matteo Berrettini [9]	6–3, 6–2, 6–7^{(5–7)}, 7–5
Matches on Court Simonne Mathieu
Event	Winner	Loser	Score
Women's Doubles Quarterfinals	(Romania) Irina-Camelia Begu (Argentina) Nadia Podoroska	(Croatia) Petra Martić (United States) Shelby Rogers	6–3, 4–6, 6–2
Women's Doubles Quarterfinals	(Poland) Magda Linette (United States) Bernarda Pera	(Russia) Anastasia Pavlyuchenkova (Kazakhstan) Elena Rybakina	7–5, 4–6, 6–2
Coloured background indicates a night match
Day matches began at 11 am, whilst night match began at 8 pm CEST

== Day 12 (10 June) ==
- Seeds out:
  - Women's Singles: (Greece) Maria Sakkari [17]
  - Men's Doubles: (Colombia) Juan Sebastián Cabal / (Colombia) Robert Farah [2]
- Schedule of play

Matches on main courts
Matches on Court Philippe Chatrier (Center Court)
Event	Winner	Loser	Score
Mixed Doubles Final	(United States) Desirae Krawczyk (United Kingdom) Joe Salisbury	(Russia) Elena Vesnina (Russia) Aslan Karatsev	2–6, 6–4, [10–5]
Women's Singles Semifinals	(Russia) Anastasia Pavlyuchenkova [31]	(Slovenia) Tamara Zidanšek	7–5, 6–3
Women's Singles Semifinals	(Czech Republic) Barbora Krejčíková	(Greece) Maria Sakkari [17]	7–5, 4–6, 9–7
Matches on Court Simonne Mathieu
Event	Winner	Loser	Score
Men's Doubles Semifinals	(Kazakhstan) Alexander Bublik (Kazakhstan) Andrey Golubev	(Spain) Pablo Andújar (Spain) Pedro Martínez	1–6, 6–4, 6–4
Men's Doubles Semifinals	(France) Pierre-Hugues Herbert [6] (France) Nicolas Mahut [6]	(Colombia) Juan Sebastián Cabal [2] (Colombia) Robert Farah [2]	6–7^{(2–7)}, 7–6^{(7–2)}, 6–4
Matches began at 12 noon CEST

== Day 13 (11 June) ==
- Seeds out:
  - Men's Singles: (Spain) Rafael Nadal [3], (Germany) Alexander Zverev [6]
- Schedule of play

Matches on main courts
Matches on Court Philippe Chatrier (Center Court)
Event	Winner	Loser	Score
Men's Singles Semifinals	(Greece) Stefanos Tsitsipas [5]	(Germany) Alexander Zverev [6]	6–3, 6–3, 4–6, 4–6, 6–3
Men's Singles Semifinals	(Serbia) Novak Djokovic [1]	(Spain) Rafael Nadal [3]	3–6, 6–3, 7–6^{(7–4)}, 6–2
Matches on Court Simonne Mathieu
Event	Winner	Loser	Score
Women's Doubles Semifinals	(Czech Republic) Barbora Krejčíková [2] (Czech Republic) Kateřina Siniaková [2]	(Poland) Magda Linette (United States) Bernarda Pera	6–1, 6–2
Women's Doubles Semifinals	(United States) Bethanie Mattek-Sands [14] (Poland) Iga Świątek [14]	(Romania) Irina-Camelia Begu (Argentina) Nadia Podoroska	6–3, 6–4
Matches began at 12 noon CEST (3 pm on Court Philippe Chatrier)

== Day 14 (12 June) ==
- Seeds out:
  - Women's Singles: (Russia) Anastasia Pavlyuchenkova [31]
- Schedule of play

Matches on main courts
Matches on Court Philippe Chatrier (Center Court)
Event	Winner	Loser	Score
Women's Singles Final	(Czech Republic) Barbora Krejčíková	(Russia) Anastasia Pavlyuchenkova [31]	6–1, 2–6, 6–4
Men's Doubles Final	(France) Pierre-Hugues Herbert [6] (France) Nicolas Mahut [6]	(Kazakhstan) Alexander Bublik (Kazakhstan) Andrey Golubev	4–6, 7–6^{(7–1)}, 6–4
Matches began at 3 pm CEST

== Day 15 (13 June) ==
- Seeds out:
  - Men's Singles: (Greece) Stefanos Tsitsipas [5]
  - Women's Doubles: (United States) Bethanie Mattek-Sands / (Poland) Iga Świątek [14]
- Schedule of play

Matches on main courts
Matches on Court Philippe Chatrier (Center Court)
Event	Winner	Loser	Score
Women's Doubles Final	(Czech Republic) Barbora Krejčíková [2] (Czech Republic) Kateřina Siniaková [2]	(United States) Bethanie Mattek-Sands [14] (Poland) Iga Świątek [14]	6–4, 6–2
Men's Singles Final	(Serbia) Novak Djokovic [1]	(Greece) Stefanos Tsitsipas [5]	6–7^{(6–8)}, 2–6, 6–3, 6–2, 6–4
Matches began at 11:30 am CEST
