= 2021 French Open =

2021 tennis tournament held in Paris, France

- Date: 30 May – 13 June 2021
- Edition: 120
- Category: Grand Slam
- Draw: 128S / 64D / 16X
- Prize money: €34,367,215
- Surface: Clay
- Location: Paris (XVI^{e}), France
- Venue: Roland Garros Stadium

Champions

Men's singles
- (Serbia) Novak Djokovic

Women's singles
- (Czech Republic) Barbora Krejčíková

Men's doubles
- (France) Pierre-Hugues Herbert / (France) Nicolas Mahut

Women's doubles
- (Czech Republic) Barbora Krejčíková / (Czech Republic) Kateřina Siniaková

Mixed doubles
- (United States) Desirae Krawczyk / (United Kingdom) Joe Salisbury

Wheelchair men's singles
- (United Kingdom) Alfie Hewett

Wheelchair women's singles
- (Netherlands) Diede de Groot

Wheelchair quad singles
- (Australia) Dylan Alcott

Wheelchair men's doubles
- (United Kingdom) Alfie Hewett / (United Kingdom) Gordon Reid

Wheelchair women's doubles
- (Netherlands) Diede de Groot / (Netherlands) Aniek van Koot

Wheelchair quad doubles
- (United Kingdom) Andy Lapthorne / (United States) David Wagner

Boys' singles
- (France) Luca Van Assche

Girls' singles
- (Czech Republic) Linda Nosková

Boys' doubles
- (France) Arthur Fils / (France) Giovanni Mpetshi Perricard

Girls' doubles
- (Philippines) Alex Eala / (Russia) Oksana Selekhmeteva
- French Open

The 2021 French Open was a major level tennis tournament played on outdoor clay courts. It was held at the Stade Roland Garros in Paris, France, from 30 May to 13 June 2021, comprising singles, doubles and mixed doubles play. The qualifiers took place from 24 May to 28 May. Junior and wheelchair tournaments also took place. Rafael Nadal was the four-time defending champion in men's singles, and Iga Świątek was the defending champion in women's singles.

It was the 120th edition of the French Open and the second Grand Slam event of 2021. The main singles draws included 16 qualifiers for men and 16 for women out of 128 players in each draw, the last Grand Slam to expand the 128 women qualifiers instead of 96 in line with the other three majors.

Novak Djokovic won the men's singles title over Stefanos Tsitsipas in the final, marking his 19th Grand Slam singles title and making him the first male player to win the double career Grand Slam in the Open Era. Barbora Krejčíková won the women's singles title over Anastasia Pavlyuchenkova in the final, claiming her maiden Grand Slam singles title. This was the first time in French Open history that both singles victors were from Slavic-speaking nations, namely Serbia and the Czech Republic.

This was the first edition of the event to have formal night sessions in the schedule, joining a practice already established at the Australian Open and US Open, with one match having a 21:00 local time start time each day.

This was the final Grand Slam to use the advantage set in the final set at singles matches, where it was replaced by final set tiebreaker in future tournaments.

The mixed doubles event returned after a one-year absence, though the draw featured only 16 teams instead of the regular 32.

== Impact of the COVID-19 pandemic ==
The beginning of the tournament returned to its traditional late-May schedule after the previous edition being delayed to September 2020 due to the COVID-19 pandemic. On 8 April, the originally-announced dates were postponed by one week by the French Tennis Federation due to a third national lockdown and curfew in France enacted the week prior, with the first day of qualifiers pushed back to 24 May, and first day of the tournament proper pushed back to 30 May. The postponement was made in the hope that restrictions would be eased in time for the tournament, including potentially allowing spectators.

At the start of the tournament, the main courts were capped at 1,000 spectators, and spectators were prohibited after 21:00 nightly due to the nationwide curfew. This caused night session matches to be held behind closed doors. Beginning 9 June, the curfew was moved to 23:00, and centre court was permitted to expand to 5,000 spectators. During the 11 June semi-final match between Novak Djokovic and Rafael Nadal, Prime Minister Jean Castex personally phoned the organizers after a 93-minute third-set tiebreak set to issue an exemption, allowing the match to be played to its conclusion with spectators.

== Singles players ==
Men's singles

Men's singles players
Champion		Runner-up	
(Serbia) Novak Djokovic [1]		(Greece) Stefanos Tsitsipas [5]	
Semifinals out
(Spain) Rafael Nadal [3]		(Germany) Alexander Zverev [6]	
Quarterfinals out
(Italy) Matteo Berrettini [9]	(Argentina) Diego Schwartzman [10]	(Spain) Alejandro Davidovich Fokina	(Russia) Daniil Medvedev [2]
4th round out
(Italy) Lorenzo Musetti	(Switzerland) Roger Federer [8]	(Italy) Jannik Sinner [18]	(Germany) Jan-Lennard Struff
(Japan) Kei Nishikori	(Argentina) Federico Delbonis	(Spain) Pablo Carreño Busta [12]	(Chile) Cristian Garín [22]
3rd round out
(Lithuania) Ričardas Berankis	(Italy) Marco Cecchinato	(South Korea) Kwon Soon-woo	(Germany) Dominik Koepfer
(United Kingdom) Cameron Norrie	(Sweden) Mikael Ymer	(Germany) Philipp Kohlschreiber (PR)	(Spain) Carlos Alcaraz (Q)
(Serbia) Laslo Đere	(Switzerland) Henri Laaksonen (Q)	(Norway) Casper Ruud [15]	(Italy) Fabio Fognini [27]
(United States) John Isner [31]	(United States) Steve Johnson	(United States) Marcos Giron	(United States) Reilly Opelka [32]
2nd round out
(Uruguay) Pablo Cuevas	(Australia) James Duckworth	(Australia) Alex de Minaur [21]	(Japan) Yoshihito Nishioka
(Argentina) Federico Coria	(Italy) Andreas Seppi	(United States) Taylor Fritz [30]	(Croatia) Marin Čilić
(France) Richard Gasquet	(South Africa) Lloyd Harris	(Italy) Gianluca Mager	(France) Gaël Monfils [14]
(Slovenia) Aljaž Bedene	(Russia) Aslan Karatsev [24]	(Georgia (country)) Nikoloz Basilashvili [28]	(Argentina) Facundo Bagnis
(Russia) Roman Safiullin (Q)	(Serbia) Miomir Kecmanović	(Russia) Karen Khachanov [23]	(Spain) Roberto Bautista Agut [11]
(Poland) Kamil Majchrzak (PR)	(Netherlands) Botic van de Zandschulp (Q)	(Hungary) Márton Fucsovics	(Spain) Pablo Andújar
(Spain) Pedro Martínez	(Serbia) Filip Krajinović	(Brazil) Thiago Monteiro	(France) Enzo Couacaud (WC)
(Argentina) Guido Pella	(United States) Mackenzie McDonald (Q)	(Spain) Jaume Munar	(United States) Tommy Paul
1st round out
(United States) Tennys Sandgren	(France) Lucas Pouille	(Italy) Salvatore Caruso	(France) Ugo Humbert [29]
(Italy) Stefano Travaglia	(Japan) Yasutaka Uchiyama	(France) Jo-Wilfried Tsonga	(Belgium) David Goffin [13]
(Japan) Taro Daniel (Q)	(Spain) Feliciano López	(South Africa) Kevin Anderson	(Canada) Félix Auger-Aliassime [20]
(Portugal) João Sousa	(France) Mathias Bourgue (WC)	(France) Arthur Rinderknech (WC)	(Uzbekistan) Denis Istomin (Q)
(Australia) Alexei Popyrin	(France) Hugo Gaston (WC)	(United States) Bjorn Fratangelo (Q)	(Italy) Lorenzo Sonego [26]
(France) Pierre-Hugues Herbert	(Germany) Peter Gojowczyk (LL)	(Spain) Roberto Carballés Baena	(Spain) Albert Ramos Viñolas
(Chinese Taipei) Lu Yen-hsun (PR)	(France) Adrian Mannarino	(Spain) Fernando Verdasco	(United States) Jenson Brooksby (Q)
(Serbia) Dušan Lajović	(Spain) Bernabé Zapata Miralles (Q)	(France) Benjamin Bonzi (WC)	(Russia) Andrey Rublev [7]
(Germany) Oscar Otte (Q)	(Spain) Carlos Taberner (Q)	(France) Corentin Moutet	(United Kingdom) Dan Evans [25]
(Czech Republic) Jiří Veselý	(Italy) Alessandro Giannessi (Q)	(Germany) Yannick Hanfmann	(Spain) Mario Vilella Martínez (Q)
(France) Benoît Paire	(France) Arthur Cazaux (WC)	(Kazakhstan) Mikhail Kukushkin	(Poland) Hubert Hurkacz [19]
(France) Grégoire Barrère (WC)	(France) Gilles Simon	(Moldova) Radu Albot	(Austria) Dominic Thiem [4]
(France) Jérémy Chardy	(United States) Sebastian Korda	(Germany) Maximilian Marterer (Q)	(United States) Sam Querrey
(Argentina) Francisco Cerúndolo (LL)	(United States) Frances Tiafoe	(Belarus) Egor Gerasimov	(Slovakia) Norbert Gombos
(Bulgaria) Grigor Dimitrov [16]	(Colombia) Daniel Elahi Galán (Q)	(Finland) Emil Ruusuvuori	(Argentina) Juan Ignacio Londero
(Slovakia) Andrej Martin	(Australia) Jordan Thompson	(Australia) Christopher O'Connell (WC)	(Kazakhstan) Alexander Bublik

Women's singles

Women's singles players
Champion		Runner-up	
(Czech Republic) Barbora Krejčíková		(Russia) Anastasia Pavlyuchenkova [31]	
Semifinals out
(Greece) Maria Sakkari [17]		(Slovenia) Tamara Zidanšek	
Quarterfinals out
(United States) Coco Gauff [24]	(Poland) Iga Świątek [8]	(Kazakhstan) Elena Rybakina [21]	(Spain) Paula Badosa [33]
4th round out
(Tunisia) Ons Jabeur [25]	(United States) Sloane Stephens	(United States) Sofia Kenin [4]	(Ukraine) Marta Kostyuk
(United States) Serena Williams [7]	(Belarus) Victoria Azarenka [15]	(Romania) Sorana Cîrstea	(Czech Republic) Markéta Vondroušová [20]
3rd round out
(Poland) Magda Linette	(United States) Jennifer Brady [13]	(Czech Republic) Karolína Muchová [18]	(Ukraine) Elina Svitolina [5]
(United States) Jessica Pegula [28]	(Belgium) Elise Mertens [14]	(Russia) Varvara Gracheva	(Estonia) Anett Kontaveit [30]
(United States) Danielle Collins	(Russia) Elena Vesnina (PR)	(United States) Madison Keys [23]	(Belarus) Aryna Sabalenka [3]
(Czech Republic) Kateřina Siniaková	(Russia) Daria Kasatkina	(Slovenia) Polona Hercog	(Romania) Ana Bogdan
2nd round out
(Australia) Ashleigh Barty [1]	(Australia) Astra Sharma (WC)	(China) Wang Qiang	(France) Fiona Ferro
(Czech Republic) Karolína Plíšková [9]	(United States) Varvara Lepchenko (Q)	(Russia) Ekaterina Alexandrova [32]	(United States) Ann Li
(United States) Hailey Baptiste (Q)	(Czech Republic) Tereza Martincová	(Italy) Jasmine Paolini	(Kazakhstan) Zarina Diyas
(China) Zheng Saisai	(Italy) Camila Giorgi	(France) Kristina Mladenovic	(Sweden) Rebecca Peterson
(Romania) Mihaela Buzărnescu (PR)	(Ukraine) Anhelina Kalinina (Q)	(Japan) Nao Hibino	(Czech Republic) Petra Kvitová [11]
(Denmark) Clara Tauson	(Canada) Leylah Annie Fernandez	(Australia) Ajla Tomljanović	(Belarus) Aliaksandra Sasnovich
(United States) Madison Brengle	(Russia) Veronika Kudermetova [29]	(Italy) Martina Trevisan	(Switzerland) Belinda Bencic [10]
(France) Caroline Garcia	(France) Harmony Tan (WC)	(Montenegro) Danka Kovinić	(Japan) Naomi Osaka [2]
1st round out
(United States) Bernarda Pera	(France) Chloé Paquet (WC)	(Romania) Irina Bara (Q)	(Kazakhstan) Yulia Putintseva
(Serbia) Aleksandra Krunić (Q)	(Chinese Taipei) Hsieh Su-wei	(Chinese Taipei) Liang En-shuo (Q)	(Latvia) Anastasija Sevastova
(Croatia) Donna Vekić	(Spain) Carla Suárez Navarro	(China) Zhang Shuai	(Germany) Andrea Petkovic (PR)
(United States) Venus Williams	(Czech Republic) Kristýna Plíšková	(Russia) Margarita Gasparyan	(France) Océane Babel (WC)
(Latvia) Jeļena Ostapenko	(Russia) Anna Blinkova	(Serbia) Ivana Jorović (PR)	(China) Zhu Lin
(Ukraine) Katarina Zavatska (Q)	(Switzerland) Stefanie Vögele (Q)	(United Kingdom) Heather Watson	(Australia) Storm Sanders (Q)
(Spain) Garbiñe Muguruza [12]	(Spain) Sara Sorribes Tormo	(Spain) Lara Arruabarrena (Q)	(Croatia) Petra Martić [22]
(Switzerland) Viktorija Golubic	(Slovakia) Anna Karolína Schmiedlová (Q)	(United States) Shelby Rogers	(Slovenia) Kaja Juvan
(Romania) Irina-Camelia Begu	(Netherlands) Arantxa Rus	(China) Wang Xiyu (Q)	(Germany) Angelique Kerber [26]
(France) Elsa Jacquemot (WC)	(Serbia) Nina Stojanović	(Belarus) Olga Govortsova (LL)	(Belgium) Greet Minnen (Q)
(Russia) Svetlana Kuznetsova	(Georgia (country)) Ekaterine Gorgodze (Q)	(Russia) Anastasia Potapova	(France) Océane Dodin (WC)
(United States) Christina McHale	(Ukraine) Kateryna Kozlova (PR)	(France) Diane Parry (WC)	(Croatia) Ana Konjuh (Q)
(Canada) Bianca Andreescu [6]	(Colombia) Camila Osorio (Q)	(Czech Republic) Marie Bouzková	(United States) Amanda Anisimova
(United Kingdom) Johanna Konta [19]	(Belgium) Alison Van Uytvanck	(Japan) Misaki Doi	(Argentina) Nadia Podoroska
(Netherlands) Kiki Bertens [16]	(Germany) Laura Siegemund	(France) Alizé Cornet	(Estonia) Kaia Kanepi
(United States) Lauren Davis	(France) Clara Burel (WC)	(Italy) Elisabetta Cocciaretto (LL)	(Romania) Patricia Maria Țig

== Events ==
=== Men's singles ===
- (Serbia) Novak Djokovic def. (Greece) Stefanos Tsitsipas 6–7^{(6–8)}, 2–6, 6–3, 6–2, 6–4

=== Women's singles ===
- (Czech Republic) Barbora Krejčíková def. (Russia) Anastasia Pavlyuchenkova 6–1, 2–6, 6–4

=== Men's doubles ===
- (France) Pierre-Hugues Herbert / (France) Nicolas Mahut def. (Kazakhstan) Alexander Bublik / (Kazakhstan) Andrey Golubev 4–6, 7–6^{(7–1)}, 6–4

=== Women's doubles ===
- (Czech Republic) Barbora Krejčíková / (Czech Republic) Kateřina Siniaková def. (United States) Bethanie Mattek-Sands / (Poland) Iga Świątek 6–4, 6–2

=== Mixed doubles ===
- (United States) Desirae Krawczyk / (United Kingdom) Joe Salisbury def. (Russia) Elena Vesnina / (Russia) Aslan Karatsev, 2–6, 6–4, [10–5]

=== Wheelchair men's singles ===
- (United Kingdom) Alfie Hewett def. (Japan) Shingo Kunieda, 6–3, 6–4

=== Wheelchair women's singles ===
- (Netherlands) Diede de Groot def. (Japan) Yui Kamiji, 6–4, 6–3

=== Wheelchair quad singles ===
- (Australia) Dylan Alcott def. (Netherlands) Sam Schröder, 6–4, 6–2

=== Wheelchair men's doubles ===
- (United Kingdom) Alfie Hewett / (United Kingdom) Gordon Reid def. (France) Stéphane Houdet / (France) Nicolas Peifer, 6–3, 6–0

=== Wheelchair women's doubles ===
- (Netherlands) Diede de Groot / (Netherlands) Aniek van Koot def. (Japan) Yui Kamiji / (United Kingdom) Jordanne Whiley, 6–3, 6–4

=== Wheelchair quad doubles ===
- (United Kingdom) Andy Lapthorne / (United States) David Wagner def. (Australia) Dylan Alcott / (Netherlands) Sam Schröder, 7–6^{(7–1)}, 4–6, [10–7]

=== Boys' singles ===
- (France) Luca Van Assche def. (France) Arthur Fils, 6–4, 6–2

=== Girls' singles ===
- (Czech Republic) Linda Nosková def. (Russia) Erika Andreeva, 7–6^{(7–3)}, 6–3

=== Boys' doubles ===
- (France) Arthur Fils / (France) Giovanni Mpetshi Perricard def. (Belgium) Martin Katz / (Ukraine) German Samofalov, 7–5, 6–2

=== Girls' doubles ===
- (Philippines) Alex Eala / (Russia) Oksana Selekhmeteva def. (Russia) Maria Bondarenko / (Hungary) Amarissa Kiara Tóth, 6–0, 7–5

== Point distribution and prize money ==
=== Point distribution ===
As a Grand Slam tournament, the points for the French Open are the highest of all ATP and WTA tournaments. These points determine the world ATP and WTA rankings for men's and women's competition, respectively. In both singles and doubles, women received slightly higher point totals compared to their male counterparts at each round of the tournament, except for the first and last. Points and rankings for the wheelchair events fall under the jurisdiction of the ITF Wheelchair Tennis Tour, which also places Grand Slams as the highest classification.

The ATP and WTA rankings were both altered in 2020 due to the COVID-19 pandemic. Both rankings were frozen on 16 March 2020 upon the suspension of both tours, and as a result the traditional 52-week ranking system was extended to cover the period from March 2019 to March 2021 with a player's best 18 results in that time period factoring into their point totals.

For the ATP, In March 2021, the ATP extended the "best of" logic to their rankings through to the week of 9 August 2021.

- Players who have played the same Tour-level event more than once, adopt a "best of" and can count their highest points total from the same tournament,
- Results from the rescheduled 2020 event will also be included for an additional 52 weeks at 50%.

Below is a series of tables for each of the competitions showing the ranking points on offer for each event.

==== Senior points ====
Event	W	F	SF	QF	Round of 16	Round of 32	Round of 64	Round of 128	Q	Q3	Q2	Q1
Men's singles	2000	1200	720	360	180	90	45	10	25	16	8	0
Men's doubles	2000	1200	720	360	180	90	0	—N/a	—N/a	—N/a	—N/a	—N/a
Women's singles	2000	1300	780	430	240	130	70	10	40	30	20	2
Women's doubles	2000	1300	780	430	240	130	10	—N/a	—N/a	—N/a	—N/a	—N/a

==== Wheelchair points ====
Event	W	F	SF/3rd	QF/4th
Singles	800	500	375	100
Doubles	800	500	100	—N/a
Quad singles	800	500	100	—N/a
Quad doubles	800	100	—N/a	—N/a

==== Junior points ====
Event	W	F	SF	QF	Round of 16	Round of 32	Q	Q3
Boys' singles	1000	600	370	200	100	45	30	20
Girls' singles	1000	600	370	200	100	45	30	20
Boys' doubles	750	450	275	150	75	—N/a	—N/a	—N/a
Girls' doubles	750	450	275	150	75	—N/a	—N/a	—N/a

=== Prize money ===
About a month before the tournament began, the prize money pool was announced to be €34,367,215, a reduction of 10.53% compared to the prize pool for 2020 edition.

Event	W	F	SF	QF	R16	R32	R64	R128	Q3	Q2	Q1
Singles	€1,400,000	€750,000	€375,000	€255,000	€170,000	€113,000	€84,000	€60,000	€25,600	€16,000	€10,000
Doubles*	€244,295	€144,074	€84,749	€49,853	€29,325	€17,250	€11,500	—N/a	—N/a	—N/a	—N/a
Mixed doubles*	€122,000	€61,000	€31,000	€17,500	€10,000	—N/a	—N/a	—N/a	—N/a	—N/a	—N/a
Wheelchair singles	€53,000	€	€	€	—N/a	—N/a	—N/a	—N/a	—N/a	—N/a	—N/a
Wheelchair doubles*	€16,000	€	€	—N/a	—N/a	—N/a	—N/a	—N/a	—N/a	—N/a	—N/a
Quad Wheelchair singles	€20,000	€	€	—N/a	—N/a	—N/a	—N/a	—N/a	—N/a	—N/a	—N/a
Quad Wheelchair doubles*	€4,000	€	—N/a	—N/a	—N/a	—N/a	—N/a	—N/a	—N/a	—N/a	—N/a

*per team

Preceded by 2020 French Open	French Open	Succeeded by 2022 French Open
Preceded by 2021 Australian Open	Grand Slam events	Succeeded by 2021 Wimbledon Championships
