= 2021 French Open – Men's doubles =

Tennis tournament

Men's doubles
- 2021 French Open

Final
- Champions: (France) Pierre-Hugues Herbert (France) Nicolas Mahut
- Runners-up: (Kazakhstan) Alexander Bublik (Kazakhstan) Andrey Golubev
- Score: 4–6, 7–6^{(7–1)}, 6–4

Events
Singles	men	women		boys	girls
Doubles	men	women	mixed	boys	girls
WC Singles	men	women	quad
WC Doubles	men	women	quad
Legends	−45	45+	women
- French Open

Nicolas Mahut and Pierre-Hugues Herbert defeated Alexander Bublik and Andrey Golubev in the final, 4–6, 7–6^{(7–1)}, 6–4 to win the men's doubles title at the 2021 French Open. It was their second French Open title and fifth major title together. They saved match points en route to the title, in the semifinals against Juan Sebastián Cabal and Robert Farah. Bublik and Golubev became the first male Kazakhstani players to contest a major final.

Kevin Krawietz and Andreas Mies were the two-time reigning champions, but Mies did not participate due to injury. Krawietz played alongside Horia Tecău, but they lost in the quarterfinals to Cabal and Farah.

Hugo Nys became the first ever Monegasque player to reach the quarterfinals of a major.

== Seeds ==
1. (Croatia) Nikola Mektić / (Croatia) Mate Pavić (withdrew owing to positive COVID-19 tests)
2. (Colombia) Juan Sebastián Cabal / (Colombia) Robert Farah (semifinals)
3. (United States) Rajeev Ram / (United Kingdom) Joe Salisbury (second round)
4. (Spain) Marcel Granollers / (Argentina) Horacio Zeballos (second round)
5. (Croatia) Ivan Dodig / (Slovakia) Filip Polášek (second round)
6. (France) Pierre-Hugues Herbert / (France) Nicolas Mahut (champions)
7. (United Kingdom) Jamie Murray / (Brazil) Bruno Soares (third round)
8. (Poland) Łukasz Kubot / (Brazil) Marcelo Melo (first round)

9. (Germany) Kevin Krawietz / (Romania) Horia Tecău (quarterfinals)
10. (Australia) John Peers / (New Zealand) Michael Venus (second round)
11. (Netherlands) Wesley Koolhof / (Netherlands) Jean-Julien Rojer (third round)
12. (Finland) Henri Kontinen / (France) Édouard Roger-Vasselin (first round)
13. (France) Jérémy Chardy / (France) Fabrice Martin (second round)
14. (Belgium) Sander Gillé / (Belgium) Joran Vliegen (third round)
15. (South Africa) Raven Klaasen / (Japan) Ben McLachlan (second round)
16. (New Zealand) Marcus Daniell / (Austria) Philipp Oswald (second round)

Click on the seed number of a player to go to their draw section.

== Draw ==
Key

- Q = Qualifier
- WC = Wild card
- LL = Lucky loser
- Alt = Alternate
- ITF = ITF entry
- PR = Protected ranking
- SR = Special ranking
- SE = Special exempt
- JE = Junior exempt
- JR = Junior Accelerator Programme entrant
- CO = College Accelerator Programme entrant
- NG = Next Gen Accelerator Program entrant
- w/o = Walkover
- r = Retired
- d = Defaulted

=== Finals ===
Quarterfinals
Alt	(Spain) Pablo Andújar (Spain) Pedro Martínez	7	6
(India) Rohan Bopanna (Croatia) Franko Škugor	5	3
(Monaco) Hugo Nys (Germany) Tim Pütz	4	4
(Kazakhstan) Alexander Bublik (Kazakhstan) Andrey Golubev	6	6
6	(France) Pierre-Hugues Herbert (France) Nicolas Mahut	7^{7}	6
(Bosnia and Herzegovina) Tomislav Brkić (Serbia) Nikola Ćaćić	6^{5}	1
9	(Germany) Kevin Krawietz (Romania) Horia Tecău	2	7^{7}	5
2	(Colombia) Juan Sebastián Cabal (Colombia) Robert Farah	6	6^{3}	7

Semifinals
Alt	(Spain) Pablo Andújar (Spain) Pedro Martínez	6	4	4
(Kazakhstan) Alexander Bublik (Kazakhstan) Andrey Golubev	1	6	6
6	(France) Pierre-Hugues Herbert (France) Nicolas Mahut	6^{2}	7^{7}	6
2	(Colombia) Juan Sebastián Cabal (Colombia) Robert Farah	7^{7}	6^{2}	4

Final
(Kazakhstan) Alexander Bublik (Kazakhstan) Andrey Golubev	6	6^{1}	4
6	(France) Pierre-Hugues Herbert (France) Nicolas Mahut	4	7^{7}	6

=== Top half ===
==== Section 1 ====
First round
Alt	(Spain) P Andújar (Spain) P Martínez	6	6
Alt	(Uruguay) P Cuevas (Argentina) G Pella	4	2
WC	(France) A Cazaux (France) H Gaston	6	6^{4}	6
(United States) S Johnson (United States) S Querrey	3	7^{7}	1
(Serbia) M Kecmanović (Norway) C Ruud	5	1
(United States) A Krajicek (United States) T Sandgren	7	6
(Italy) L Sonego (Italy) A Vavassori	4	4
14	(Belgium) S Gillé (Belgium) J Vliegen	6	6
12	(Finland) H Kontinen (France) É Roger-Vasselin	7^{7}	6^{1}	6^{2}
(El Salvador) M Arévalo (Netherlands) M Middelkoop	6^{4}	7^{7}	7^{7}
(Argentina) F Delbonis (India) D Sharan	6	6^{11}	4
(Australia) A de Minaur (Australia) M Reid	3	7^{13}	6
(India) R Bopanna (Croatia) F Škugor	6	6
(Georgia (country)) N Basilashvili (Germany) A Begemann	4	2
(United States) N Monroe (United States) F Tiafoe	6	6
8	(Poland) Ł Kubot (Brazil) M Melo	3	4

Second round
Alt	(Spain) P Andújar (Spain) P Martínez	7	6
WC	(France) A Cazaux (France) H Gaston	5	2
(United States) A Krajicek (United States) T Sandgren	4	1
14	(Belgium) S Gillé (Belgium) J Vliegen	6	6
(El Salvador) M Arévalo (Netherlands) M Middelkoop	7^{7}	6
(Australia) A de Minaur (Australia) M Reid	6^{2}	4
(India) R Bopanna (Croatia) F Škugor	6	7
(United States) N Monroe (United States) F Tiafoe	4	5

Third round
Alt	(Spain) P Andújar (Spain) P Martínez	6	7^{8}
14	(Belgium) S Gillé (Belgium) J Vliegen	4	6^{6}
(El Salvador) M Arévalo (Netherlands) M Middelkoop
(India) R Bopanna (Croatia) F Škugor	w/o

Quarterfinals
Alt	(Spain) P Andújar (Spain) P Martínez	7	6
(India) R Bopanna (Croatia) F Škugor	5	3

==== Section 2 ====
First round
3	(United States) R Ram (United Kingdom) J Salisbury	7	6
(Italy) S Caruso (Spain) A Davidovich Fokina	5	3
WC	(France) Q Halys (France) A Mannarino	6^{5}	2
(Monaco) H Nys (Germany) T Pütz	7^{7}	6
(Monaco) R Arneodo (France) B Paire	6	5	6
PR	(Spain) M López (Austria) J Melzer	2	7	4
(Hungary) M Fucsovics (Italy) S Travaglia	3	3
16	(New Zealand) M Daniell (Austria) P Oswald	6	6
11	(Netherlands) W Koolhof (Netherlands) J-J Rojer	6	4	6
(Serbia) F Krajinović (Serbia) D Lajović	4	6	2
(Slovenia) A Bedene (United States) J Withrow	1	4
(Germany) D Koepfer (Finland) E Ruusuvuori	6	6
(Kazakhstan) A Bublik (Kazakhstan) A Golubev	7^{9}	6
WC	(France) S Doumbia (France) F Reboul	6^{7}	1
(Argentina) A Molteni (Denmark) F Nielsen	5	7^{8}	6^{6}
5	(Croatia) I Dodig (Slovakia) F Polášek	7	6^{6}	7^{8}

Second round
3	(United States) R Ram (United Kingdom) J Salisbury	4	4
(Monaco) H Nys (Germany) T Pütz	6	6
(Monaco) R Arneodo (France) B Paire	6	6
16	(New Zealand) M Daniell (Austria) P Oswald	0	4
11	(Netherlands) W Koolhof (Netherlands) J-J Rojer	6	7^{7}
(Germany) D Koepfer (Finland) E Ruusuvuori	4	6^{3}
(Kazakhstan) A Bublik (Kazakhstan) A Golubev	7^{7}	6
5	(Croatia) I Dodig (Slovakia) F Polášek	6^{5}	1

Third round
(Monaco) H Nys (Germany) T Pütz	6	6
(Monaco) R Arneodo (France) B Paire	4	4
11	(Netherlands) W Koolhof (Netherlands) J-J Rojer	6^{2}	6	4
(Kazakhstan) A Bublik (Kazakhstan) A Golubev	7^{7}	3	6

Quarterfinals
(Monaco) H Nys (Germany) T Pütz	4	4
(Kazakhstan) A Bublik (Kazakhstan) A Golubev	6	6

=== Bottom half ===
==== Section 3 ====
First round
6	(France) P-H Herbert (France) N Mahut	6	3	6
(United Kingdom) C Norrie (United Kingdom) J O'Mara	3	6	3
(Argentina) F Coria (Argentina) D Schwartzman	1	2
(Israel) J Erlich (South Africa) L Harris	6	6
(Netherlands) R Haase (Germany) J-L Struff	6	6
(Australia) M Ebden (Australia) J-P Smith	3	4
WC	(France) B Bonzi (France) A Hoang	6	2	4
10	(Australia) J Peers (New Zealand) M Venus	4	6	6
13	(France) J Chardy (France) F Martin	6^{4}	6	6
(Italy) L Musetti (United States) T Paul	7^{7}	1	1
(Italy) S Bolelli (Argentina) M González	6	6
(United States) T Fritz (United States) M McDonald	4	3
(Australia) A Popyrin (Australia) J Thompson	5	7^{7}	3
(Bosnia and Herzegovina) T Brkić (Serbia) N Ćaćić	7	6^{4}	6
(Poland) H Hurkacz (Poland) S Walków	1	1
4	(Spain) M Granollers (Argentina) H Zeballos	6	6

Second round
6	(France) P-H Herbert (France) N Mahut	6	3	7
(Israel) J Erlich (South Africa) L Harris	3	6	5
(Netherlands) R Haase (Germany) J-L Struff	6	7^{7}
10	(Australia) J Peers (New Zealand) M Venus	4	6^{5}
13	(France) J Chardy (France) F Martin	2	3
(Italy) S Bolelli (Argentina) M González	6	6
(Bosnia and Herzegovina) T Brkić (Serbia) N Ćaćić	6	3	6
4	(Spain) M Granollers (Argentina) H Zeballos	3	6	3

Third round
6	(France) P-H Herbert (France) N Mahut	0	6	7^{7}
(Netherlands) R Haase (Germany) J-L Struff	6	3	6^{5}
(Italy) S Bolelli (Argentina) M González	4	4
(Bosnia and Herzegovina) T Brkić (Serbia) N Ćaćić	6	6

Quarterfinals
6	(France) P-H Herbert (France) N Mahut	7^{7}	6
(Bosnia and Herzegovina) T Brkić (Serbia) N Ćaćić	6^{5}	1

==== Section 4 ====
First round
7	(United Kingdom) J Murray (Brazil) B Soares	7^{7}	6^{4}	6
(United Kingdom) L Bambridge (United Kingdom) D Inglot	6^{5}	7^{7}	3
(Austria) O Marach (Pakistan) A-u-H Qureshi	3	7	6
(Brazil) M Demoliner (Mexico) S González	6	5	2
Alt/PR	(Austria) J Knowle (Netherlands) D Pel	4	1
PR	(Chinese Taipei) Y-h Lu (Japan) Y Nishioka	6	6
(Uruguay) A Behar (Ecuador) G Escobar	3	6	6^{5}
9	(Germany) K Krawietz (Romania) H Tecău	6	3	7^{7}
15	(South Africa) R Klaasen (Japan) B McLachlan	6	6
WC	(France) M Bourgue (France) L Pouille	3	2
(Australia) M Purcell (Australia) L Saville	6	6^{2}	7^{12}
WC	(France) G Barrère (France) A Olivetti	2	7^{7}	6^{10}
(Lithuania) R Berankis (Spain) A Ramos Viñolas	6^{1}	2
WC	(France) D Added (France) J-W Tsonga	7^{7}	6
(United Kingdom) K Skupski (United Kingdom) N Skupski	4	4
2	(Colombia) JS Cabal (Colombia) R Farah	6	6

Second round
7	(United Kingdom) J Murray (Brazil) B Soares	7	6
(Austria) O Marach (Pakistan) A-u-H Qureshi	5	1
PR	(Chinese Taipei) Y-h Lu (Japan) Y Nishioka	3	2
9	(Germany) K Krawietz (Romania) H Tecău	6	6
15	(South Africa) R Klaasen (Japan) B McLachlan	6	2	1
(Australia) M Purcell (Australia) L Saville	3	6	6
WC	(France) D Added (France) J-W Tsonga	6^{0}	3
2	(Colombia) JS Cabal (Colombia) R Farah	7^{7}	6

Third round
7	(United Kingdom) J Murray (Brazil) B Soares	3	6	3
9	(Germany) K Krawietz (Romania) H Tecău	6	3	6
(Australia) M Purcell (Australia) L Saville	4	3
2	(Colombia) JS Cabal (Colombia) R Farah	6	6

Quarterfinals
9	(Germany) K Krawietz (Romania) H Tecău	2	7^{7}	5
2	(Colombia) JS Cabal (Colombia) R Farah	6	6^{3}	7

== Other entry information ==
=== Wild cards ===
- (France) Dan Added / (France) Jo-Wilfried Tsonga
- (France) Grégoire Barrère / (France) Albano Olivetti
- (France) Benjamin Bonzi / (France) Antoine Hoang
- (France) Mathias Bourgue / (France) Lucas Pouille
- (France) Arthur Cazaux / (France) Hugo Gaston
- (France) Sadio Doumbia / (France) Fabien Reboul
- (France) Quentin Halys / (France) Adrian Mannarino

=== Protected ranking ===
- (Austria) Julian Knowle / (Netherlands) David Pel
- (Spain) Marc López / (Austria) Jürgen Melzer
- (Chinese Taipei) Lu Yen-hsun / (Japan) Yoshihito Nishioka

=== Alternate pairs ===
- (Spain) Pablo Andújar / (Spain) Pedro Martínez
- (Uruguay) Pablo Cuevas / (Argentina) Guido Pella
- (Austria) Julian Knowle / (Netherlands) David Pel

=== Withdrawals ===
Before the tournament

- (Spain) Feliciano López / (Spain) Jaume Munar → replaced by (Uruguay) Pablo Cuevas / (Argentina) Guido Pella
- (Croatia) Nikola Mektić / (Croatia) Mate Pavić → replaced by (Spain) Pablo Andújar / (Spain) Pedro Martínez
- (Australia) John Millman / (Brazil) Thiago Monteiro → replaced by (Austria) Julian Knowle / (Netherlands) David Pel

During the tournament

- (El Salvador) Marcelo Arévalo / (Netherlands) Matwé Middelkoop
