= 2021 French Open – Women's doubles =

Tennis tournament

Women's doubles
- 2021 French Open

Final
- Champions: (Czech Republic) Barbora Krejčíková (Czech Republic) Kateřina Siniaková
- Runners-up: (United States) Bethanie Mattek-Sands (Poland) Iga Świątek
- Score: 6–4, 6–2

Events
Singles	men	women		boys	girls
Doubles	men	women	mixed	boys	girls
WC Singles	men	women	quad
WC Doubles	men	women	quad
Legends	−45	45+	women
← 2020 ·	French Open	· 2022 →

Barbora Krejčíková and Kateřina Siniaková defeated Bethanie Mattek-Sands and Iga Świątek in the final, 6–4, 6–2 to win the women's doubles tennis title at the 2021 French Open. It was their second French Open title and third major title together. Krejčíková became the first woman to win both the singles and doubles tournaments at a major since Serena Williams at the 2016 Wimbledon Championships, and the first to do so at the French Open since Mary Pierce in 2000, making her the seventh woman to accomplish the sweep in French Open history. Mattek-Sands and Świątek reached the final after saving seven match points in their third round match against Hsieh Su-wei and Elise Mertens.

By winning the title, Krejčíková also reclaimed the world No. 1 doubles ranking. Kristina Mladenovic and Hsieh Su-wei were both in contention for the ranking, but Mladenovic did not participate and Hsieh lost in the third round.

Tímea Babos and Mladenovic were the two-time reigning champions, but Mladenovic did not participate. Babos partnered Vera Zvonareva, but the pair were defeated in the first round by Petra Martić and Shelby Rogers.

== Seeds ==
1. (Chinese Taipei) Hsieh Su-wei / (Belgium) Elise Mertens (third round)
2. (Czech Republic) Barbora Krejčíková / (Czech Republic) Kateřina Siniaková (champions)
3. (United States) Nicole Melichar / (Netherlands) Demi Schuurs (third round)
4. (Japan) Shuko Aoyama / (Japan) Ena Shibahara (second round)
5. (Chile) Alexa Guarachi / (United States) Desirae Krawczyk (first round)
6. (Chinese Taipei) Chan Hao-ching / (Chinese Taipei) Latisha Chan (third round)
7. (Hungary) Tímea Babos / (Russia) Vera Zvonareva (first round)
8. (China) Xu Yifan / (China) Zhang Shuai (second round)

9. (Canada) Sharon Fichman / (Mexico) Giuliana Olmos (third round)
10. (Czech Republic) Lucie Hradecká / (Germany) Laura Siegemund (third round)
11. (Croatia) Darija Jurak / (Slovenia) Andreja Klepač (quarterfinals)
12. (Romania) Monica Niculescu / (Latvia) Jeļena Ostapenko (third round)
13. (Australia) Ellen Perez / (China) Zheng Saisai (second round, withdrew)
14. (United States) Bethanie Mattek-Sands / (Poland) Iga Świątek (final)
15. (Australia) Ashleigh Barty / (United States) Jennifer Brady (withdrew)
16. (Ukraine) Nadiia Kichenok / (Romania) Raluca Olaru (second round)

Click on the seed number of a player to go to their draw section.

== Draw ==
=== Key ===
- Q = Qualifier
- WC = Wild card
- LL = Lucky loser
- Alt = Alternate
- SE = Special exempt
- PR = Protected ranking
- ITF = ITF entry
- JE = Junior exempt
- w/o = Walkover
- r = Retired
- d = Defaulted
- SR = Special ranking

=== Finals ===
Quarterfinals
14	(United States) Bethanie Mattek-Sands (Poland) Iga Świątek	6	6
11	(Croatia) Darija Jurak (Slovenia) Andreja Klepač	3	2
(Romania) Irina-Camelia Begu (Argentina) Nadia Podoroska	6	4	6
(Croatia) Petra Martić (United States) Shelby Rogers	3	6	2
(Poland) Magda Linette (United States) Bernarda Pera	7	4	6
(Russia) Anastasia Pavlyuchenkova (Kazakhstan) Elena Rybakina	5	6	2
(Czech Republic) Karolína Plíšková (Czech Republic) Kristýna Plíšková	4	4
2	(Czech Republic) Barbora Krejčíková (Czech Republic) Kateřina Siniaková	6	6

Semifinals
14	(United States) Bethanie Mattek-Sands (Poland) Iga Świątek	6	6
(Romania) Irina-Camelia Begu (Argentina) Nadia Podoroska	3	4
(Poland) Magda Linette (United States) Bernarda Pera	1	2
2	(Czech Republic) Barbora Krejčíková (Czech Republic) Kateřina Siniaková	6	6

Final
14	(United States) Bethanie Mattek-Sands (Poland) Iga Świątek	4	2
2	(Czech Republic) Barbora Krejčíková (Czech Republic) Kateřina Siniaková	6	6

=== Top half ===
==== Section 1 ====
First round
1	(Chinese Taipei) S-w Hsieh (Belgium) E Mertens	6	6
WC	(France) E Jacquemot (France) E Lechemia	2	3
WC	(France) S Djoubri (France) O Dodin	2	3
(United States) A Anisimova (Russia) A Potapova	6	6
(Russia) V Kudermetova (Russia) E Vesnina	1	5
(Germany) A-L Friedsam (China) Y Wang	6	7
WC	(France) A Droguet (France) S Janicijevic	0	1
14	(United States) B Mattek-Sands (Poland) I Świątek	6	6
11	(Croatia) D Jurak (Slovenia) A Klepač	7^{7}	6
(United States) M Brengle (United States) D Collins	6^{2}	1
(Netherlands) A Rus (Slovenia) T Zidanšek	6	6
(Sweden) C Lister (Sweden) R Peterson	3	0
(Japan) M Doi (Slovenia) P Hercog	7^{7}	6
(Netherlands) L Pattinama Kerkhove (Netherlands) R van der Hoek	6^{3}	4
PR	(Russia) I Khromacheva (Montenegro) D Kovinić	6	4	1
6	(Chinese Taipei) H-c Chan (Chinese Taipei) L Chan	1	6	6

Second round
1	(Chinese Taipei) S-w Hsieh (Belgium) E Mertens	6	6
(United States) A Anisimova (Russia) A Potapova	2	2
(Germany) A-L Friedsam (China) Y Wang	5	3
14	(United States) B Mattek-Sands (Poland) I Świątek	7	6
11	(Croatia) D Jurak (Slovenia) A Klepač	7^{7}	6
(Netherlands) A Rus (Slovenia) T Zidanšek	6^{2}	4
(Japan) M Doi (Slovenia) P Hercog	2^{r}
6	(Chinese Taipei) H-c Chan (Chinese Taipei) L Chan	5

Third round
1	(Chinese Taipei) S-w Hsieh (Belgium) E Mertens	7	4	5
14	(United States) B Mattek-Sands (Poland) I Świątek	5	6	7
11	(Croatia) D Jurak (Slovenia) A Klepač	4	6	6
6	(Chinese Taipei) H-c Chan (Chinese Taipei) L Chan	6	3	1

Quarterfinals
14	(United States) B Mattek-Sands (Poland) I Świątek	6	6
11	(Croatia) D Jurak (Slovenia) A Klepač	3	2

==== Section 2 ====
First round
4	(Japan) S Aoyama (Japan) E Shibahara	6	3	7^{7}
(Spain) P Badosa (Spain) A Bolsova	3	6	6^{1}
WC	(France) E Cascino (France) J Ponchet	3	1
(Romania) I-C Begu (Argentina) N Podoroska	6	6
WC	(France) C Burel (France) C Paquet	5	7	7
(Japan) M Kato (Czech Republic) R Voráčová	7	5	5
(Ukraine) L Kichenok (Australia) Ar Rodionova	1	7	4
16	(Ukraine) N Kichenok (Romania) R Olaru	6	5	6
9	(Canada) S Fichman (Mexico) G Olmos	6	6
(Russia) A Blinkova (United Kingdom) H Watson	3	2
PR	(Romania) M Buzărnescu (Romania) PM Țig	4	2
(Spain) L Arruabarrena (United States) C Dolehide	6	6
(Japan) M Ninomiya (China) Z Yang	6	6
(Czech Republic) M Bouzková (Spain) S Sorribes Tormo	2	2
(Croatia) P Martić (United States) S Rogers	7^{7}	6
7	(Hungary) T Babos (Russia) V Zvonareva	6^{5}	3

Second round
4	(Japan) S Aoyama (Japan) E Shibahara	5	6	3
(Romania) I-C Begu (Argentina) N Podoroska	7	3	6
WC	(France) C Burel (France) C Paquet	6	7
16	(Ukraine) N Kichenok (Romania) R Olaru	4	5
9	(Canada) S Fichman (Mexico) G Olmos	6	6
(Spain) L Arruabarrena (United States) C Dolehide	4	1
(Japan) M Ninomiya (China) Z Yang	4	3
(Croatia) P Martić (United States) S Rogers	6	6

Third round
(Romania) I-C Begu (Argentina) N Podoroska	6	6
WC	(France) C Burel (France) C Paquet	3	1
9	(Canada) S Fichman (Mexico) G Olmos	6	1	3
(Croatia) P Martić (United States) S Rogers	3	6	6

Quarterfinals
(Romania) I-C Begu (Argentina) N Podoroska	6	4	6
(Croatia) P Martić (United States) S Rogers	3	6	2

=== Bottom half ===
==== Section 3 ====
First round
5	(Chile) A Guarachi (United States) D Krawczyk	3	7^{7}	3
(Poland) M Linette (United States) B Pera	6	6^{4}	6
(United States) K Christian (United States) S Santamaria	3	5
Alt	(Kazakhstan) Z Diyas (Russia) V Gracheva	6	7
(Italy) J Paolini (Serbia) N Stojanović	2	6	3
(United States) A Muhammad (United States) J Pegula	6	2	6
(United States) L Davis (India) A Raina	4	4
10	(Czech Republic) L Hradecká (Germany) L Siegemund	6	6
Alt	(Belgium) G Minnen (Belgium) A Van Uytvanck	1	2
(Russia) A Pavlyuchenkova (Kazakhstan) E Rybakina	6	6
(Australia) S Sanders (Australia) A Tomljanović	6	6
(Russia) E Alexandrova (Russia) Y Sizikova	1	1
PR	(Poland) A Rosolska (United States) C Vandeweghe	6	3	2
(Romania) A Mitu (Kazakhstan) Y Putintseva	3	6	6
WC	(France) D Parry (France) M Yerolymos	5	4
3	(United States) N Melichar (Netherlands) D Schuurs	7	6

Second round
(Poland) M Linette (United States) B Pera	6	6
Alt	(Kazakhstan) Z Diyas (Russia) V Gracheva	0	2
(United States) A Muhammad (United States) J Pegula	6	4	0
10	(Czech Republic) L Hradecká (Germany) L Siegemund	4	6	6
(Russia) A Pavlyuchenkova (Kazakhstan) E Rybakina	6	6
(Australia) S Sanders (Australia) A Tomljanović	2	2
(Romania) A Mitu (Kazakhstan) Y Putintseva	2	0
3	(United States) N Melichar (Netherlands) D Schuurs	6	6

Third round
(Poland) M Linette (United States) B Pera	7^{7}	7^{7}
10	(Czech Republic) L Hradecká (Germany) L Siegemund	6^{5}	6^{5}
(Russia) A Pavlyuchenkova (Kazakhstan) E Rybakina	6	6
3	(United States) N Melichar (Netherlands) D Schuurs	4	3

Quarterfinals
(Poland) M Linette (United States) B Pera	7	4	6
(Russia) A Pavlyuchenkova (Kazakhstan) E Rybakina	5	6	2

==== Section 4 ====
First round
8	(China) Y Xu (China) S Zhang	6	6
PR	(Switzerland) V Golubic (Russia) A Panova	4	4
(Serbia) A Krunić (Italy) M Trevisan	0	1
(Czech Republic) Ka Plíšková (Czech Republic) Kr Plíšková	6	6
(Japan) N Hibino (Georgia (country)) O Kalashnikova	6	6
(Russia) A Kalinskaya (Slovakia) V Kužmová	2	3
(Ukraine) M Kostyuk (Belarus) A Sasnovich	0	3
12	(Romania) M Niculescu (Latvia) J Ostapenko	6	6
13	(Australia) E Perez (China) S Zheng	6^{5}	6	6
(United States) C Gauff (United States) V Williams	7^{7}	4	3
(Canada) G Dabrowski (Canada) LA Fernandez	6	6
(Spain) G García Pérez (Germany) J Wachaczyk	2	1
(Germany) V Heisen (Czech Republic) K Peschke	6	3	7
(United States) H Carter (Australia) A Sharma	3	6	5
WC	(France) A Hesse (France) H Tan	3	2
2	(Czech Republic) B Krejčíková (Czech Republic) K Siniaková	6	6

Second round
8	(China) Y Xu (China) S Zhang	7^{8}	3	3
(Czech Republic) Ka Plíšková (Czech Republic) Kr Plíšková	6^{6}	6	6
(Japan) N Hibino (Georgia (country)) O Kalashnikova	1	2
12	(Romania) M Niculescu (Latvia) J Ostapenko	6	6
13	(Australia) E Perez (China) S Zheng
(Canada) G Dabrowski (Canada) LA Fernandez	w/o
(Germany) V Heisen (Czech Republic) K Peschke	4	0
2	(Czech Republic) B Krejčíková (Czech Republic) K Siniaková	6	6

Third round
(Czech Republic) Ka Plíšková (Czech Republic) Kr Plíšková	7	1	6
12	(Romania) M Niculescu (Latvia) J Ostapenko	5	6	4
(Canada) G Dabrowski (Canada) LA Fernandez	3	6	3
2	(Czech Republic) B Krejčíková (Czech Republic) K Siniaková	6	3	6

Quarterfinals
(Czech Republic) Ka Plíšková (Czech Republic) Kr Plíšková	4	4
2	(Czech Republic) B Krejčíková (Czech Republic) K Siniaková	6	6

== Other entry information ==
=== Wild cards ===
- (France) Clara Burel / (France) Chloé Paquet
- (France) Estelle Cascino / (France) Jessika Ponchet
- (France) Salma Djoubri / (France) Océane Dodin
- (France) Aubane Droguet / (France) Séléna Janicijevic
- (France) Amandine Hesse / (France) Harmony Tan
- (France) Elsa Jacquemot / (France) Elixane Lechemia
- (France) Diane Parry / (France) Margot Yerolymos

=== Protected ranking ===
- (Romania) Mihaela Buzărnescu / (Romania) Patricia Maria Țig
- (Switzerland) Viktorija Golubic / (Russia) Alexandra Panova
- (Russia) Irina Khromacheva / (Montenegro) Danka Kovinić
- (Poland) Alicja Rosolska / (United States) CoCo Vandeweghe

=== Alternate pairs ===
- (Kazakhstan) Zarina Diyas / (Russia) Varvara Gracheva
- (Belgium) Greet Minnen / (Belgium) Alison Van Uytvanck

=== Withdrawals ===
Before the tournament

- (Spain) Paula Badosa / (France) Alizé Cornet → replaced by (Spain) Paula Badosa / (Spain) Aliona Bolsova
- (Australia) Ashleigh Barty / (United States) Jennifer Brady → replaced by (Belgium) Greet Minnen / (Belgium) Alison Van Uytvanck
- (Switzerland) Belinda Bencic / (United States) Sofia Kenin → replaced by (Kazakhstan) Zarina Diyas / (Russia) Varvara Gracheva
- (United States) Hayley Carter / (Brazil) Luisa Stefani → replaced by (United States) Hayley Carter / (Australia) Astra Sharma
- (United States) Coco Gauff / (United States) Caty McNally → replaced by (United States) Coco Gauff / (United States) Venus Williams
- (Serbia) Nina Stojanović / (Switzerland) Jil Teichmann → replaced by (Italy) Jasmine Paolini / (Serbia) Nina Stojanović

During the tournament

- (Australia) Ellen Perez / (China) Zheng Saisai

=== Retirements ===
- (Japan) Misaki Doi / (Slovenia) Polona Hercog
