= 2021 French Open – Women's singles =

Tennis tournament

Women's singles
- 2021 French Open

Final
- Champion: (Czech Republic) Barbora Krejčíková
- Runner-up: (Russia) Anastasia Pavlyuchenkova
- Score: 6–1, 2–6, 6–4

Details
- Draw: 128 (16 Q / 8 WC)
- Seeds: 32

Events
Singles	men	women		boys	girls
Doubles	men	women	mixed	boys	girls
WC Singles	men	women	quad
WC Doubles	men	women	quad
Legends	−45	45+	women
← 2020 ·	French Open	· 2022 →

Barbora Krejčíková defeated Anastasia Pavlyuchenkova in the final, 6–1, 2–6, 6–4 to win the women's singles tennis title at the 2021 French Open. It was her first major singles title. Krejčíková saved a match point en route to the title, in the semifinals against Maria Sakkari. Krejčíková and Pavlyuchenkova were the combined lowest-ranked major finalists (world Nos. 33 and 32, respectively) since the introduction of the computer rankings in 1975 (a feat surpassed just three months later at the US Open).

Krejčíková was the first Czech to win the title since Hana Mandlíková in 1981. (Note: Although Martina Navratilova was the women's singles champion at the French Open in 1982 and 1984, she won both titles whilst competing for the United States of America.) She was also the first player to win both the singles and doubles titles at the same major since Serena Williams at the 2016 Wimbledon Championships, and the first to do so at the French Open since Mary Pierce in 2000. Pavlyuchenkova reached her first major final after participating in 52 major main draws, breaking the record previously set by Flavia Pennetta in the 2015 US Open.

Iga Świątek was the defending champion, but lost to Sakkari in the quarterfinals. Świątek's loss marked the 14th consecutive year where the reigning French Open champion failed to defend their title, with Justine Henin being the last woman to do so in 2007 (Świątek would end this stretch herself two years later). It ensured the sixth consecutive French Open to feature a first-time major champion. Świątek's loss also ensured that this was the first French Open and the third major in the Open Era to feature all first-time major semifinalists, and it was the first major in the Open Era in which six players made their major quarterfinal debuts.

Ashleigh Barty and Naomi Osaka were in contention for the world No. 1 singles ranking. Barty retained the top ranking after Osaka withdrew from the second round.

Serena Williams was the oldest woman in the Open Era to reach the fourth round; this was also the three-time champion's final French Open appearance before retiring from professional tennis the following year. Sakkari and Tamara Zidanšek became the first Greek woman and Slovenian player to reach the singles quarterfinals and semifinals of a major, respectively. (Note: Zidanšek became the first player representing Slovenia as an independent country following its independence from Yugoslavia in 1991. Mima Jaušovec, who the 1977, did so when Slovenia was part of Yugoslavia.) Coco Gauff was the youngest player to reach a major quarterfinal since Nicole Vaidišová at the 2006 French Open.

== Seeds ==
1. (Australia) Ashleigh Barty (second round, retired)
2. (Japan) Naomi Osaka (second round, withdrew)
3. (Belarus) Aryna Sabalenka (third round)
4. (United States) Sofia Kenin (fourth round)
5. (Ukraine) Elina Svitolina (third round)
6. (Canada) Bianca Andreescu (first round)
7. (United States) Serena Williams (fourth round)
8. (Poland) Iga Świątek (quarterfinals)
9. (Czech Republic) Karolína Plíšková (second round)
10. (Switzerland) Belinda Bencic (second round)
11. (Czech Republic) Petra Kvitová (second round, withdrew)
12. (Spain) Garbiñe Muguruza (first round)
13. (United States) Jennifer Brady (third round, retired)
14. (Belgium) Elise Mertens (third round)
15. (Belarus) Victoria Azarenka (fourth round)
16. (Netherlands) Kiki Bertens (first round)
17. (Greece) Maria Sakkari (semifinals)
18. (Czech Republic) Karolína Muchová (third round)
19. (United Kingdom) Johanna Konta (first round)
20. (Czech Republic) Markéta Vondroušová (fourth round)
21. (Kazakhstan) Elena Rybakina (quarterfinals)
22. (Croatia) Petra Martić (first round)
23. (United States) Madison Keys (third round)
24. (United States) Coco Gauff (quarterfinals)
25. (Tunisia) Ons Jabeur (fourth round)
26. (Germany) Angelique Kerber (first round)
27. (United States) Alison Riske (withdrew)
28. (United States) Jessica Pegula (third round)
29. (Russia) Veronika Kudermetova (second round)
30. (Estonia) Anett Kontaveit (third round)
31. (Russia) Anastasia Pavlyuchenkova (final)
32. (Russia) Ekaterina Alexandrova (second round)
33. (Spain) Paula Badosa (quarterfinals)

Click on the seed number of a player to go to their draw section.

== Draw ==
=== Key ===
- Q = Qualifier
- WC = Wild card
- LL = Lucky loser
- Alt = Alternate
- ITF = ITF entry
- PR = Protected ranking
- SR = Special ranking
- SE = Special exempt
- JE = Junior exempt
- JR = Junior Accelerator Programme entrant
- CO = College Accelerator Programme entrant
- NG = Next Gen Accelerator Program entrant
- w/o = Walkover
- r = Retired
- d = Defaulted

=== Finals ===
Quarterfinals
24	(United States) Coco Gauff	6^{6}	3
(Czech Republic) Barbora Krejčíková	7^{8}	6
17	(Greece) Maria Sakkari	6	6
8	(Poland) Iga Świątek	4	4
21	(Kazakhstan) Elena Rybakina	7^{7}	2	7
31	(Russia) Anastasia Pavlyuchenkova	6^{2}	6	9
(Slovenia) Tamara Zidanšek	7	4	8
33	(Spain) Paula Badosa	5	6	6

Semifinals
(Czech Republic) Barbora Krejčíková	7	4	9
17	(Greece) Maria Sakkari	5	6	7
31	(Russia) Anastasia Pavlyuchenkova	7	6
(Slovenia) Tamara Zidanšek	5	3

Final
(Czech Republic) Barbora Krejčíková	6	2	6
31	(Russia) Anastasia Pavlyuchenkova	1	6	4

=== Top half ===
==== Section 1 ====
First round
1	(Australia) A Barty	6	3	6
(United States) B Pera	4	6	2
(Poland) M Linette	6	6
WC	(France) C Paquet	3	3
Q	(Romania) I Bara	6^{5}	2
WC	(Australia) A Sharma	7^{7}	6
(Kazakhstan) Y Putintseva	5	2
25	(Tunisia) O Jabeur	7	6
24	(United States) C Gauff	7^{13}	6
Q	(Serbia) A Krunić	6^{11}	4
(China) Q Wang	2	6	7
(Chinese Taipei) S-w Hsieh	6	4	5
Q	(Chinese Taipei) E-s Liang	1	6	4
(France) F Ferro	6	1	6
(Latvia) A Sevastova	3	3
13	(United States) J Brady	6	6

Second round
1	(Australia) A Barty	1	2^{r}
(Poland) M Linette	6	2
WC	(Australia) A Sharma	2	4
25	(Tunisia) O Jabeur	6	6
24	(United States) C Gauff	6	7^{7}
(China) Q Wang	3	6^{1}
(France) F Ferro	4	6	5
13	(United States) J Brady	6	2	7

Third round
(Poland) M Linette	6	0	1
25	(Tunisia) O Jabeur	3	6	6
24	(United States) C Gauff	6	0
13	(United States) J Brady	1	0^{r}

Fourth round
25	(Tunisia) O Jabeur	3	1
24	(United States) C Gauff	6	6

==== Section 2 ====
First round
9	(Czech Republic) Ka Plíšková	7	6
(Croatia) D Vekić	5	4
(Spain) C Suárez Navarro	6	6^{4}	4
(United States) S Stephens	3	7^{7}	6
Q	(United States) V Lepchenko	6	6
(China) S Zhang	3	3
PR	(Germany) A Petkovic	6	3	4
18	(Czech Republic) K Muchová	1	6	6
32	(Russia) E Alexandrova	6	6
(United States) V Williams	3	1
(Czech Republic) B Krejčíková	5	6	6
(Czech Republic) Kr Plíšková	7	4	2
(United States) A Li	6	6
(Russia) M Gasparyan	0	1
WC	(France) O Babel	2	5
5	(Ukraine) E Svitolina	6	7

Second round
9	(Czech Republic) Ka Plíšková	5	1
(United States) S Stephens	7	6
Q	(United States) V Lepchenko	3	4
18	(Czech Republic) K Muchová	6	6
32	(Russia) E Alexandrova	2	3
(Czech Republic) B Krejčíková	6	6
(United States) A Li	0	4
5	(Ukraine) E Svitolina	6	6

Third round
(United States) S Stephens	6	7
18	(Czech Republic) K Muchová	3	5
(Czech Republic) B Krejčíková	6	6
5	(Ukraine) E Svitolina	3	2

Fourth round
(United States) S Stephens	2	0
(Czech Republic) B Krejčíková	6	6

==== Section 3 ====
First round
4	(United States) S Kenin	6	4	6
(Latvia) J Ostapenko	4	6	3
Q	(United States) H Baptiste	6	6
(Russia) A Blinkova	1	4
(Czech Republic) T Martincová	6	7^{8}
PR	(Serbia) I Jorović	3	6^{6}
(China) L Zhu	4	6	4
28	(United States) J Pegula	6	4	6
17	(Greece) M Sakkari	6	6
Q	(Ukraine) K Zavatska	4	1
(Italy) J Paolini	7	6
Q	(Switzerland) S Vögele	5	1
(United Kingdom) H Watson	4	5
(Kazakhstan) Z Diyas	6	7
Q	(Australia) S Sanders	4	1
14	(Belgium) E Mertens	6	6

Second round
4	(United States) S Kenin	7	6
Q	(United States) H Baptiste	5	3
(Czech Republic) T Martincová	3	3
28	(United States) J Pegula	6	6
17	(Greece) M Sakkari	6	6
(Italy) J Paolini	2	3
(Kazakhstan) Z Diyas	6	2	4
14	(Belgium) E Mertens	4	6	6

Third round
4	(United States) S Kenin	4	6	6
28	(United States) J Pegula	6	1	4
17	(Greece) M Sakkari	7	6^{2}	6
14	(Belgium) E Mertens	5	7^{7}	2

Fourth round
4	(United States) S Kenin	1	3
17	(Greece) M Sakkari	6	6

==== Section 4 ====
First round
12	(Spain) G Muguruza	1	4
(Ukraine) M Kostyuk	6	6
(China) S Zheng	4	6	6
(Spain) S Sorribes Tormo	6	4	4
Q	(Spain) L Arruabarrena	2	3
(Russia) V Gracheva	6	6
(Italy) C Giorgi	6	6^{5}	6
22	(Croatia) P Martić	2	7^{7}	4
30	(Estonia) A Kontaveit	6^{4}	7^{7}	6
(Switzerland) V Golubic	7^{7}	6^{5}	0
Q	(Slovakia) AK Schmiedlová	4	0
(France) K Mladenovic	6	6
(Sweden) R Peterson	6^{3}	7^{10}	6
(United States) S Rogers	7^{7}	6^{8}	2
(Slovenia) K Juvan	0	5
8	(Poland) I Świątek	6	7

Second round
(Ukraine) M Kostyuk	6	6
(China) S Zheng	3	4
(Russia) V Gracheva	7	1	6
(Italy) C Giorgi	5	6	2
30	(Estonia) A Kontaveit	6	6
(France) K Mladenovic	2	0
(Sweden) R Peterson	1	1
8	(Poland) I Świątek	6	6

Third round
(Ukraine) M Kostyuk	6	6
(Russia) V Gracheva	1	2
30	(Estonia) A Kontaveit	6^{4}	0
8	(Poland) I Świątek	7^{7}	6

Fourth round
(Ukraine) M Kostyuk	3	4
8	(Poland) I Świątek	6	6

=== Bottom half ===
==== Section 5 ====
First round
7	(United States) S Williams	7^{8}	6
(Romania) I-C Begu	6^{6}	2
(Netherlands) A Rus	5	5
PR	(Romania) M Buzărnescu	7	7
(United States) D Collins	6	4	6
Q	(China) Xiy Wang	2	6	4
Q	(Ukraine) A Kalinina	6	6
26	(Germany) A Kerber	2	4
21	(Kazakhstan) E Rybakina	6	6
WC	(France) E Jacquemot	4	1
(Japan) N Hibino	7^{7}	6
(Serbia) N Stojanović	6^{4}	2
PR	(Russia) E Vesnina	6	6
LL	(Belarus) O Govortsova	1	0
Q	(Belgium) G Minnen	7^{7}	6^{5}	1
11	(Czech Republic) P Kvitová	6^{3}	7^{7}	6

Second round
7	(United States) S Williams	6	5	6
PR	(Romania) M Buzărnescu	3	7	1
(United States) D Collins	6	6
Q	(Ukraine) A Kalinina	0	2
21	(Kazakhstan) E Rybakina	6	6
(Japan) N Hibino	3	1
PR	(Russia) E Vesnina	w/o
11	(Czech Republic) P Kvitová

Third round
7	(United States) S Williams	6	6
(United States) D Collins	4	4
21	(Kazakhstan) E Rybakina	6	6
PR	(Russia) E Vesnina	1	4

Fourth round
7	(United States) S Williams	3	5
21	(Kazakhstan) E Rybakina	6	7

==== Section 6 ====
First round
15	(Belarus) V Azarenka	6	2	6
(Russia) S Kuznetsova	4	6	3
(Denmark) C Tauson	6	6
Q	(Georgia (country)) E Gorgodze	4	2
(Canada) L Fernandez	6	6
(Russia) A Potapova	2	1
WC	(France) O Dodin	3	6	1
23	(United States) M Keys	6	3	6
31	(Russia) A Pavlyuchenkova	6	6
(United States) C McHale	4	0
PR	(Ukraine) K Kozlova	2	4
(Australia) A Tomljanović	6	6
WC	(France) D Parry	3	6	3
(Belarus) A Sasnovich	6	3	6
Q	(Croatia) A Konjuh	4	3
3	(Belarus) A Sabalenka	6	6

Second round
15	(Belarus) V Azarenka	7	6
(Denmark) C Tauson	5	4
(Canada) L Fernandez	1	5
23	(United States) M Keys	6	7
31	(Russia) A Pavlyuchenkova	6	6
(Australia) A Tomljanović	2	3
(Belarus) A Sasnovich	5	3
3	(Belarus) A Sabalenka	7	6

Third round
15	(Belarus) V Azarenka	6	6
23	(United States) M Keys	2	2
31	(Russia) A Pavlyuchenkova	6	2	6
3	(Belarus) A Sabalenka	4	6	0

Fourth round
15	(Belarus) V Azarenka	7	3	2
31	(Russia) A Pavlyuchenkova	5	6	6

==== Section 7 ====
First round
6	(Canada) B Andreescu	7^{7}	6^{2}	7
(Slovenia) T Zidanšek	6^{1}	7^{7}	9
(United States) M Brengle	7	6
Q	(Colombia) C Osorio	5	4
(Czech Republic) M Bouzková	0	6	2
(Czech Republic) K Siniaková	6	4	6
(United States) A Anisimova	6^{5}	1
29	(Russia) V Kudermetova	7^{7}	6
19	(United Kingdom) J Konta	6^{5}	2
(Romania) S Cîrstea	7^{7}	6
(Belgium) A Van Uytvanck	5	6	4
(Italy) M Trevisan	7	4	6
(Russia) D Kasatkina	6	5	6
(Japan) M Doi	3	7	3
(Argentina) N Podoroska	0	3
10	(Switzerland) B Bencic	6	6

Second round
(Slovenia) T Zidanšek	6	6
(United States) M Brengle	4	1
(Czech Republic) K Siniaková	7^{9}	5	7
29	(Russia) V Kudermetova	6^{7}	7	5
(Romania) S Cîrstea	6	3	6
(Italy) M Trevisan	4	6	4
(Russia) D Kasatkina	6	6
10	(Switzerland) B Bencic	2	2

Third round
(Slovenia) T Zidanšek	0	7^{7}	6
(Czech Republic) K Siniaková	6	6^{5}	2
(Romania) S Cîrstea	6	6
(Russia) D Kasatkina	3	2

Fourth round
(Slovenia) T Zidanšek	7^{7}	6
(Romania) S Cîrstea	6^{4}	1

==== Section 8 ====
First round
16	(Netherlands) K Bertens	1	6	4
(Slovenia) P Hercog	6	3	6
(Germany) L Siegemund	3	1
(France) C Garcia	6	6
(France) A Cornet	4	4
WC	(France) H Tan	6	6
(Estonia) K Kanepi	6	3	0
20	(Czech Republic) M Vondroušová	4	6	6
33	(Spain) P Badosa	6	7^{7}
(United States) L Davis	2	6^{3}
WC	(France) C Burel	3	6^{8}
(Montenegro) D Kovinić	6	7^{10}
LL	(Italy) E Cocciaretto	1	3
(Romania) A Bogdan	6	6
(Romania) PM Țig	4	6^{4}
2	(Japan) N Osaka	6	7^{7}

Second round
(Slovenia) P Hercog	7	6
(France) C Garcia	5	4
WC	(France) H Tan	1	3
20	(Czech Republic) M Vondroušová	6	6
33	(Spain) P Badosa	6	6
(Montenegro) D Kovinić	2	0
(Romania) A Bogdan	w/o
2	(Japan) N Osaka

Third round
(Slovenia) P Hercog	3	3
20	(Czech Republic) M Vondroušová	6	6
33	(Spain) P Badosa	2	7^{7}	6
(Romania) A Bogdan	6	6^{4}	4

Fourth round
20	(Czech Republic) M Vondroušová	4	6	2
33	(Spain) P Badosa	6	3	6

== Championship match statistics ==
Category	(Czech Republic) Krejčíková	(Russia) Pavlyuchenkova
1st serve %	58/80 (73%)	53/80 (66%)
1st serve points won	32 of 58 = 55%	26 of 53 = 49%
2nd serve points won	12 of 22 = 55%	13 of 27 = 48%
Total service points won	44 of 80 = 55.00%	39 of 80 = 48.75%
Aces	2	2
Double faults	5	1
Winners	34	23
Unforced errors	31	16
Net points won	11 of 15 = 73%	2 of 6 = 33%
Break points converted	6 of 14 = 43%	5 of 12 = 42%
Return points won	41 of 80 = 51%	36 of 80 = 45%
Total points won	85	75

== Seeded players ==
The following are the seeded players. Seedings are based on WTA rankings as of 24 May 2021. Rankings and points before are as of 31 May 2021. Because the tournament was moved a week and points of the week of 10 June 2019 includes results only from Nottingham. The defending points from 's-Hertogenbosch is not included towards on dropping points.

As a result of pandemic-related adjustments to the ranking system and changes to the WTA Tour calendar in 2020, players will have the following potential adjustments to their ranking points after the tournament:

- Players who are defending points from the 2019 tournament in which are higher will be dropped on 14 June 2021; those points will be replaced by the higher of their points from 2019 or 2020 (points from 2020 will still be valid at the end of the 2021 tournament because the 2020 tournament delayed to four months in the normal scheduled calendar year; both 2019 and 2020 points are equaled within the same result will also be dropped on 11 October 2021).
- Players who are defending points from the 2020 tournament will have those points replaced by 2021 points only if the latter are higher.
- Players who have points from the 2020 tournament still counting towards their ranking on 14 June 2021 will have those points dropped on 11 October 2021 (52 weeks after the 2020 tournament); any 2020 points will be replaced by 2021 points at that time.
- Players who are not defending points from either the 2019 or 2020 tournaments will have their 16th best result replaced by their points from the 2021 tournament.

Note that this is a different ranking adjustment system than the one being used by the ATP for the men's event.

Seed	Rank	Player	Points before	2019 Points	2020 Points	Points won	Points after	Status
1	1	(Australia) Ashleigh Barty	10,175	2,000	-	70	8,245	Second round retired against (Poland) Magda Linette
2	2	(Japan) Naomi Osaka	7,461	130	-	70	7,401	Second round withdrew due to mental health issues
3	4	(Belarus) Aryna Sabalenka	6,195	70	130	130	6,195	Third round lost to (Russia) Anastasia Pavlyuchenkova [31]
4	5	(United States) Sofia Kenin	5,865	240	1,300	240	5,865^{†}	Fourth round lost to (Greece) Maria Sakkari [17]
5	6	(Ukraine) Elina Svitolina	5,835	130	430	130	5,835^{†}	Third round lost to (Czech Republic) Barbora Krejčíková
6	7	(Canada) Bianca Andreescu	5,325	70	-	10	5,265	First round lost to (Slovenia) Tamara Zidanšek
7	8	(United States) Serena Williams	4,821	130	70	240	4,931	Fourth round lost to (Kazakhstan) Elena Rybakina [21]
8	9	(Poland) Iga Świątek	4,435	240	2,000	430	4,435^{†}	Quarterfinals lost to (Greece) Maria Sakkari [17]
9	10	(Czech Republic) Karolína Plíšková	4,345	130	70	70	4,285	Second round lost to (United States) Sloane Stephens
10	11	(Switzerland) Belinda Bencic	4,140	130	-	70	4,080	Second round lost to (Russia) Daria Kasatkina
11	12	(Czech Republic) Petra Kvitová	4,115	0	780	70	4,115^{†}	Second round withdrew due to an ankle injury
12	13	(Spain) Garbiñe Muguruza	4,110	240	130	10	4,000	First round lost to (Ukraine) Marta Kostyuk
13	14	(United States) Jennifer Brady	3,830	70+110	10	70+130	3,830	Third round retired against (United States) Coco Gauff [24]
14	15	(Belgium) Elise Mertens	3,685	130	130	130	3,685	Third round lost to (Greece) Maria Sakkari [17]
15	16	(Belarus) Victoria Azarenka	3,526	70	70	240	3,696	Fourth round lost to (Russia) Anastasia Pavlyuchenkova [31]
16	17	(Netherlands) Kiki Bertens	3,220	70	240	10	3,220^{†}	First round lost to (Slovenia) Polona Hercog
17	18	(Greece) Maria Sakkari	2,830	70	130	780	3,480	Semifinals lost to (Czech Republic) Barbora Krejčíková
18	19	(Czech Republic) Karolína Muchová	2,816	70	10	130	2,876	Third round lost to (United States) Sloane Stephens
19	20	(United Kingdom) Johanna Konta	2,756	780	10	10	1,986	First round lost to (Romania) Sorana Cîrstea
20	21	(Czech Republic) Markéta Vondroušová	2,746	1,300	10	240	1,686	Fourth round lost to (Spain) Paula Badosa [33]
21	22	(Kazakhstan) Elena Rybakina	2,683	40	70	430	3,043	Quarterfinals lost to (Russia) Anastasia Pavlyuchenkova [31]
22	23	(Croatia) Petra Martić	2,660	430	130	10	2,360	First round lost to (Italy) Camila Giorgi
23	24	(United States) Madison Keys	2,606	430	10	130	2,306	Third round lost to (Belarus) Victoria Azarenka [15]
24	25	(United States) Coco Gauff	2,420	20	70	430	2,780	Quarterfinals lost to (Czech Republic) Barbora Krejčíková
25	26	(Tunisia) Ons Jabeur	2,415	10	240	240	2,415	Fourth round lost to (United States) Coco Gauff [24]
26	27	(Germany) Angelique Kerber	2,320	10	10	10	2,320	First round lost to (Ukraine) Anhelina Kalinina [Q]
~~27~~	~~28~~	~~(United States) Alison Riske~~	2,222	10+70	10	0	2,152	Withdrew due to a right knee injury
28	29	(United States) Jessica Pegula	2,219	10	10	130	2,339	Third round lost to (United States) Sofia Kenin [4]
29	30	(Russia) Veronika Kudermetova	2,160	130	70	70	2,100	Second round lost to (Czech Republic) Kateřina Siniaková
30	31	(Estonia) Anett Kontaveit	2,145	10	10	130	2,265	Third round lost to (Poland) Iga Świątek [8]
31	32	(Russia) Anastasia Pavlyuchenkova	2,070	10	70	1,300	3,300	Runner-up, lost to (Czech Republic) Barbora Krejčíková
32	34	(Russia) Ekaterina Alexandrova	1,940	130	130	70	1,940^{†}	Second round lost to (Czech Republic) Barbora Krejčíková
33	35	(Spain) Paula Badosa	1,870	(18)^{§}	240	430	2,060	Quarterfinals lost to (Slovenia) Tamara Zidanšek

†The player's 2019 points will be replaced by (or the player will continue to count) her 2020 points, which will be dropped on 11 October 2021, four months after the end of the 2021 tournament.
§The player did not qualify for the tournament in 2019. Accordingly, points from her 16th best result are deducted instead.

=== Withdrawn players ===
The following players would have been seeded, but withdrew before the tournament began.

Rank	Player	Points before	2019 Points	2020 Points	Points lost	Points after	Withdrawal reason
3	(Romania) Simona Halep	6,520	430	240	190	6,330	Calf injury

== Other entry information ==
=== Wildcards ===
The following players were awarded wildcards into the main draw.

- (France) Océane Babel
- (France) Clara Burel
- (France) Océane Dodin
- (France) Elsa Jacquemot
- (France) Chloé Paquet
- (France) Diane Parry
- (Australia) Astra Sharma
- (France) Harmony Tan

=== Protected ranking ===
- (Russia) Elena Vesnina (52)
- (Germany) Andrea Petkovic (80)
- (Serbia) Ivana Jorović (90)
- (Romania) Mihaela Buzărnescu (104)
- (Ukraine) Kateryna Kozlova (104)

=== Qualifiers ===
- (Spain) Lara Arruabarrena
- (United States) Hailey Baptiste
- (Romania) Irina Bara
- (Georgia (country)) Ekaterine Gorgodze
- (Ukraine) Anhelina Kalinina
- (Croatia) Ana Konjuh
- (Serbia) Aleksandra Krunić
- (United States) Varvara Lepchenko
- (Chinese Taipei) Liang En-shuo
- (Belgium) Greet Minnen
- (Colombia) Camila Osorio
- (Australia) Storm Sanders
- (Slovakia) Anna Karolína Schmiedlová
- (Switzerland) Stefanie Vögele
- (China) Wang Xiyu
- (Ukraine) Katarina Zavatska

=== Lucky losers ===
- (Italy) Elisabetta Cocciaretto
- (Belarus) Olga Govortsova

=== Withdrawals ===
- † (Czech Republic) Barbora Strýcová (44) → replaced by (Denmark) Clara Tauson (101)
- ‡ (Australia) Samantha Stosur (97 PR) → replaced by (Romania) Ana Bogdan (102)
- ‡ (Romania) Simona Halep (3) → replaced by (Italy) Jasmine Paolini (104)
- ‡ (Ukraine) Dayana Yastremska (32) → replaced by (Ukraine) Kateryna Kozlova (104 PR)
- ‡ (Belgium) Kirsten Flipkens (98) → replaced by (Romania) Mihaela Buzărnescu (104 PR) (Note: Last direct acceptance)
- § (United States) Alison Riske (28) → replaced by (Belarus) Olga Govortsova (LL)
- § (Switzerland) Jil Teichmann (42) → replaced by (Italy) Elisabetta Cocciaretto (LL)

† – not included on entry list
‡ – withdrew from entry list
§ – withdrew from main draw

== Notes ==
Preceded by 2021 Australian Open – Women's singles	Grand Slam women's singles	Succeeded by 2021 Wimbledon Championships – Women's singles
