= 2021 French Open – Men's singles =

Tennis tournament

Men's singles
- 2021 French Open

Final
- Champion: (Serbia) Novak Djokovic
- Runner-up: (Greece) Stefanos Tsitsipas
- Score: 6–7^{(6–8)}, 2–6, 6–3, 6–2, 6–4

Details
- Draw: 128
- Seeds: 32

Events
Singles	men	women		boys	girls
Doubles	men	women	mixed	boys	girls
WC Singles	men	women	quad
WC Doubles	men	women	quad
Legends	−45	45+	women
- French Open

Novak Djokovic defeated Stefanos Tsitsipas in the final, 6–7^{(6–8)}, 2–6, 6–3, 6–2, 6–4 to win the men's singles tennis title at the 2021 French Open. It was his second French Open title and 19th major title overall. Djokovic became the first man to achieve the double career Grand Slam in the Open Era, and the first player in the Open Era to win a major after coming back from two-sets-to-love down in two matches during the same major. Tsitsipas was the first Greek to reach a major final. It also marked the second consecutive year a man trailed by two sets in a major final yet rallied to win, following Dominic Thiem's victory at the 2020 US Open. It was the first time since 2004 that the final went to five sets; on that occasion, Gastón Gaudio also came from two sets down to win the title. The final was a rematch of the previous year's semifinal match, also won by Djokovic.

Rafael Nadal was the four-time defending champion, but lost to Djokovic in the semifinals in a rematch of the previous year's final. Nadal's defeat marked only his third loss out of 108 French Open matches, including his first loss in 14 semifinal appearances at the tournament. Djokovic became the only man to defeat Nadal twice at the French Open, and the only man to win the title after defeating him. It was the pair's record-extending 58th meeting.

Djokovic and Daniil Medvedev were in contention for the world No. 1 ranking; Djokovic retained the top position after Medvedev lost in the quarterfinals.

Nadal and Roger Federer were attempting to win a record-breaking 21st major title and become the outright leader in the men's singles major tally. Federer, like Djokovic, was attempting to become the first man in the Open Era to achieve the double career Grand Slam; this would be the 2009 champion's last French Open appearance. This was the only time that the Big Three, the three most successful men's singles major champions of all time, were in the same half of the draw at a major.

For the first time in the Open Era, no French players reached the third round. Thiem's first-round defeat guaranteed a new French Open finalist from the bottom half of the draw; Tsitsipas ultimately emerged as that finalist.

This marked the French Open debut of future two-time champion Carlos Alcaraz, who lost in the third round to Jan-Lennard Struff. He was the youngest player to win a match at the French Open since Djokovic in 2005, and the youngest to reach the third round since Andrei Medvedev in 1992.

== Seeds ==
1. (Serbia) Novak Djokovic (champion)
2. (Russia) Daniil Medvedev (quarterfinals)
3. (Spain) Rafael Nadal (semifinals)
4. (Austria) Dominic Thiem (first round)
5. (Greece) Stefanos Tsitsipas (final)
6. (Germany) Alexander Zverev (semifinals)
7. (Russia) Andrey Rublev (first round)
8. (Switzerland) Roger Federer (fourth round, withdrew)
9. (Italy) Matteo Berrettini (quarterfinals)
10. (Argentina) Diego Schwartzman (quarterfinals)
11. (Spain) Roberto Bautista Agut (second round)
12. (Spain) Pablo Carreño Busta (fourth round)
13. (Belgium) David Goffin (first round)
14. (France) Gaël Monfils (second round)
15. (Norway) Casper Ruud (third round)
16. (Bulgaria) Grigor Dimitrov (first round, retired)

17. (Canada) Milos Raonic (withdrew)
18. (Italy) Jannik Sinner (fourth round)
19. (Poland) Hubert Hurkacz (first round)
20. (Canada) Félix Auger-Aliassime (first round)
21. (Australia) Alex de Minaur (second round)
22. (Chile) Cristian Garín (fourth round)
23. (Russia) Karen Khachanov (second round)
24. (Russia) Aslan Karatsev (second round)
25. (United Kingdom) Dan Evans (first round)
26. (Italy) Lorenzo Sonego (first round)
27. (Italy) Fabio Fognini (third round)
28. (Georgia (country)) Nikoloz Basilashvili (second round)
29. (France) Ugo Humbert (first round)
30. (United States) Taylor Fritz (second round)
31. (United States) John Isner (third round)
32. (United States) Reilly Opelka (third round)

Click on the seed number of a player to go to their draw section.

== Draw ==
Key

- Q = Qualifier
- WC = Wild card
- LL = Lucky loser
- Alt = Alternate
- ITF = ITF entry
- PR = Protected ranking
- SR = Special ranking
- SE = Special exempt
- JE = Junior exempt
- JR = Junior Accelerator Programme entrant
- CO = College Accelerator Programme entrant
- NG = Next Gen Accelerator Program entrant
- w/o = Walkover
- r = Retired
- d = Defaulted

=== Finals ===
Quarterfinals
1	(Serbia) Novak Djokovic	6	6	6^{5}	7
9	(Italy) Matteo Berrettini	3	2	7^{7}	5
3	(Spain) Rafael Nadal	6	4	6	6
10	(Argentina) Diego Schwartzman	3	6	4	0
6	(Germany) Alexander Zverev	6	6	6
(Spain) Alejandro Davidovich Fokina	4	1	1
5	(Greece) Stefanos Tsitsipas	6	7^{7}	7
2	(Russia) Daniil Medvedev	3	6^{3}	5

Semifinals
1	(Serbia) Novak Djokovic	3	6	7^{7}	6
3	(Spain) Rafael Nadal	6	3	6^{4}	2
6	(Germany) Alexander Zverev	3	3	6	6	3
5	(Greece) Stefanos Tsitsipas	6	6	4	4	6

Final
1	(Serbia) Novak Djokovic	6^{6}	2	6	6	6
5	(Greece) Stefanos Tsitsipas	7^{8}	6	3	2	4

=== Top half ===
==== Section 1 ====
First round
1	(Serbia) N Djokovic	6	6	6
(United States) T Sandgren	2	4	2
(France) L Pouille	3	1	3
(Uruguay) P Cuevas	6	6	6
(Italy) S Caruso	4	6	6^{4}	2
(Australia) J Duckworth	6	3	7^{7}	6
(Lithuania) R Berankis	6	6	2	6
29	(France) U Humbert	4	4	6	4
21	(Australia) A de Minaur	6	6	7^{7}
(Italy) S Travaglia	2	4	6^{4}
(Japan) Y Uchiyama	6	1	2	4
(Italy) M Cecchinato	3	6	6	6
(France) J-W Tsonga	4	2	6	6^{5}
(Japan) Y Nishioka	6	6	3	7^{7}
(Italy) L Musetti	6	7	7^{7}
13	(Belgium) D Goffin	0	5	6^{3}

Second round
1	(Serbia) N Djokovic	6	6	6
(Uruguay) P Cuevas	3	2	4
(Australia) J Duckworth	5	6	6^{4}	0
(Lithuania) R Berankis	7	2	7^{7}	6
21	(Australia) A de Minaur	4	1	6	1
(Italy) M Cecchinato	6	6	3	6
(Japan) Y Nishioka	5	3	2
(Italy) L Musetti	7	6	6

Third round
1	(Serbia) N Djokovic	6	6	6
(Lithuania) R Berankis	1	4	1
(Italy) M Cecchinato	6	4	3	6	3
(Italy) L Musetti	3	6	6	3	6

Fourth round
1	(Serbia) N Djokovic	6^{7}	6^{2}	6	6	4
(Italy) L Musetti	7^{9}	7^{7}	1	0	0^{r}

==== Section 2 ====
First round
9	(Italy) M Berrettini	6	6	4	6
Q	(Japan) T Daniel	0	4	6	4
(Argentina) F Coria	6	7^{7}	6
(Spain) F López	3	6^{4}	2
(South Africa) K Anderson	5	4	6	6^{4}
(South Korea) S-w Kwon	7	6	2	7^{7}
(Italy) A Seppi	6	7^{10}	4	6
20	(Canada) F Auger-Aliassime	3	6^{8}	6	4
30	(United States) T Fritz	6	6	6
(Portugal) J Sousa	4	2	4
WC	(France) M Bourgue	3	3	4
(Germany) D Koepfer	6	6	6
(Croatia) M Čilić	7^{8}	6	6
WC	(France) A Rinderknech	6^{6}	1	2
Q	(Uzbekistan) D Istomin	2	4	3
8	(Switzerland) R Federer	6	6	6

Second round
9	(Italy) M Berrettini	6	6	6
(Argentina) F Coria	3	3	2
(South Korea) S-w Kwon	6	7	7
(Italy) A Seppi	4	5	5
30	(United States) T Fritz	3	2	6	4
(Germany) D Koepfer	6	6	3	6
(Croatia) M Čilić	2	6	6^{4}	2
8	(Switzerland) R Federer	6	2	7^{7}	6

Third round
9	(Italy) M Berrettini	7^{8}	6	6
(South Korea) S-w Kwon	6^{6}	3	4
(Germany) D Koepfer	6^{5}	7^{7}	6^{4}	5
8	(Switzerland) R Federer	7^{7}	6^{3}	7^{7}	7

Fourth round
9	(Italy) M Berrettini	w/o
8	(Switzerland) R Federer

==== Section 3 ====
First round
3	(Spain) R Nadal	6	6	7^{7}
(Australia) A Popyrin	3	2	6^{3}
WC	(France) H Gaston	1	4	2
(France) R Gasquet	6	6	6
(United Kingdom) C Norrie	7	7^{7}	6
Q	(United States) B Fratangelo	5	6^{5}	2
(South Africa) L Harris	7	6	6
26	(Italy) L Sonego	5	4	4
18	(Italy) J Sinner	6	4	6^{4}	7	6
(France) P-H Herbert	1	6	7^{7}	5	4
(Italy) G Mager	6	3	6	7
LL	(Germany) P Gojowczyk	2	6	4	5
(Sweden) M Ymer	6	0	4	6	6
(Spain) R Carballés Baena	4	6	6	2	2
(Spain) A Ramos Viñolas	6	6^{6}	4	4
14	(France) G Monfils	1	7^{8}	6	6

Second round
3	(Spain) R Nadal	6	7	6
(France) R Gasquet	0	5	2
(United Kingdom) C Norrie	4	6	6	6
(South Africa) L Harris	6	3	3	2
18	(Italy) J Sinner	6	7	3	6
(Italy) G Mager	1	5	6	3
(Sweden) M Ymer	6	2	6	6
14	(France) G Monfils	0	6	4	3

Third round
3	(Spain) R Nadal	6	6	6
(United Kingdom) C Norrie	3	3	3
18	(Italy) J Sinner	6	7	6
(Sweden) M Ymer	1	5	3

Fourth round
3	(Spain) R Nadal	7	6	6
18	(Italy) J Sinner	5	3	0

==== Section 4 ====
First round
10	(Argentina) D Schwartzman	6	6	6
PR	(Chinese Taipei) Y-h Lu	2	2	3
(France) A Mannarino	5	6	5	2
(Slovenia) A Bedene	7	3	7	6
PR	(Germany) P Kohlschreiber	7^{7}	6	2	6
(Spain) F Verdasco	6^{3}	2	6	4
Q	(United States) J Brooksby	3	4	4
24	(Russia) A Karatsev	6	6	6
28	(Georgia (country)) N Basilashvili	6	6	0	6
(Serbia) D Lajović	4	3	6	2
Q	(Spain) C Alcaraz	6	2	6	7^{7}
Q	(Spain) B Zapata Miralles	3	6	1	6^{4}
(Argentina) F Bagnis	7	6	6
WC	(France) B Bonzi	5	3	4
(Germany) J-L Struff	6	7^{8}	4	3	6
7	(Russia) A Rublev	3	6^{6}	6	6	4

Second round
10	(Argentina) D Schwartzman	6	6	6
(Slovenia) A Bedene	4	2	4
PR	(Germany) P Kohlschreiber	6	7^{7}	4	6
24	(Russia) A Karatsev	3	6^{4}	6	1
28	(Georgia (country)) N Basilashvili	4	2	4
Q	(Spain) C Alcaraz	6	6	6
(Argentina) F Bagnis	5	6^{1}	4
(Germany) J-L Struff	7	7^{7}	6

Third round
10	(Argentina) D Schwartzman	6	6	6
PR	(Germany) P Kohlschreiber	4	2	1
Q	(Spain) C Alcaraz	4	6^{3}	2
(Germany) J-L Struff	6	7^{7}	6

Fourth round
10	(Argentina) D Schwartzman	7^{11}	6	7
(Germany) J-L Struff	6^{9}	4	5

=== Bottom half ===
==== Section 5 ====
First round
6	(Germany) A Zverev	3	3	6	6	6
Q	(Germany) O Otte	6	6	2	2	0
Q	(Russia) R Safiullin	7^{7}	1	6	6
Q	(Spain) C Taberner	6^{4}	6	0	2
(France) C Moutet	3	7^{12}	6^{2}	5
(Serbia) L Đere	6	6^{10}	7^{7}	7
(Serbia) M Kecmanović	1	6	6	6
25	(United Kingdom) D Evans	6	3	3	4
23	(Russia) K Khachanov	6	6	6
(Czech Republic) J Veselý	1	2	3
(Japan) K Nishikori	6	6^{4}	6	4	6
Q	(Italy) A Giannessi	4	7^{7}	3	6	4
(Germany) Y Hanfmann	1	3	6	2
Q	(Switzerland) H Laaksonen	6	6	4	6
Q	(Spain) M Vilella Martínez	4	4	2
11	(Spain) R Bautista Agut	6	6	6

Second round
6	(Germany) A Zverev	7^{7}	6	7^{7}
Q	(Russia) R Safiullin	6^{4}	3	6^{1}
(Serbia) L Đere	4	4	6	6	6
(Serbia) M Kecmanović	6	6	3	2	3
23	(Russia) K Khachanov	6	2	6	4	4
(Japan) K Nishikori	4	6	2	6	6
Q	(Switzerland) H Laaksonen	6	2	6	6
11	(Spain) R Bautista Agut	3	6	3	2

Third round
6	(Germany) A Zverev	6	7	6
(Serbia) L Đere	2	5	2
(Japan) K Nishikori	7	0
Q	(Switzerland) H Laaksonen	5	0^{r}

Fourth round
6	(Germany) A Zverev	6	6	6
(Japan) K Nishikori	4	1	1

==== Section 6 ====
First round
15	(Norway) C Ruud	5	6	6	7^{7}
(France) B Paire	7	2	1	6^{4}
PR	(Poland) K Majchrzak	6	2	6	6
WC	(France) A Cazaux	4	6	4	4
(Spain) A Davidovich Fokina	6	6	6
(Kazakhstan) M Kukushkin	4	4	3
Q	(Netherlands) B van de Zandschulp	6^{5}	6^{4}	6	6	6
19	(Poland) H Hurkacz	7^{7}	7^{7}	2	2	4
27	(Italy) F Fognini	6	6	6
WC	(France) G Barrère	4	1	4
(Hungary) M Fucsovics	6	6	7^{7}
(France) G Simon	4	1	6^{5}
(Moldova) R Albot	1	6	0	1
(Argentina) F Delbonis	6	2	6	6
(Spain) P Andújar	4	5	6	6	6
4	(Austria) D Thiem	6	7	3	4	4

Second round
15	(Norway) C Ruud	6	6	6
PR	(Poland) K Majchrzak	3	2	4
(Spain) A Davidovich Fokina	6	6	5	2	6
Q	(Netherlands) B van de Zandschulp	4	4	7	6	4
27	(Italy) F Fognini	7^{8}	6	6
(Hungary) M Fucsovics	6^{6}	1	2
(Argentina) F Delbonis	4	6	3	6	6
(Spain) P Andújar	6	1	6	3	2

Third round
15	(Norway) C Ruud	6^{3}	6	6^{6}	6	5
(Spain) A Davidovich Fokina	7^{7}	2	7^{8}	0	7
27	(Italy) F Fognini	4	1	3
(Argentina) F Delbonis	6	6	6

Fourth round
(Spain) A Davidovich Fokina	6	6	4	6
(Argentina) F Delbonis	4	4	6	4

==== Section 7 ====
First round
5	(Greece) S Tsitsipas	7^{8}	6	6
(France) J Chardy	6^{6}	3	1
(United States) S Korda	4	2	2
(Spain) P Martínez	6	6	6
Q	(Germany) M Marterer	4	1	6^{3}
(Serbia) F Krajinović	6	6	7^{7}
(United States) S Querrey	6^{2}	3	4
31	(United States) J Isner	7^{7}	6	6
LL	(Argentina) F Cerúndolo	3	4	3
(Brazil) T Monteiro	6	6	6
(United States) S Johnson	6^{5}	3	6	6	6
(United States) F Tiafoe	7^{7}	6	4	2	1
(Belarus) E Gerasimov	6^{3}	4	3
WC	(France) E Couacaud	7^{7}	6	6
(Slovakia) N Gombos	3	4	3
12	(Spain) P Carreño Busta	6	6	6

Second round
5	(Greece) S Tsitsipas	6	6	6
(Spain) P Martínez	3	4	3
(Serbia) F Krajinović	6^{6}	1	6^{5}
31	(United States) J Isner	7^{8}	6	7^{7}
(Brazil) T Monteiro	3	7^{7}	6^{2}	6	3
(United States) S Johnson	6	6^{2}	7^{7}	3	6
WC	(France) E Couacaud	6	3	4	4
12	(Spain) P Carreño Busta	2	6	6	6

Third round
5	(Greece) S Tsitsipas	5	6	7^{7}	6
31	(United States) J Isner	7	3	6^{3}	1
(United States) S Johnson	4	4	2
12	(Spain) P Carreño Busta	6	6	6

Fourth round
5	(Greece) S Tsitsipas	6	6	7
12	(Spain) P Carreño Busta	3	2	5

==== Section 8 ====
First round
16	(Bulgaria) G Dimitrov	6	6	5	0^{r}
(United States) M Giron	2	4	7	3
(Argentina) G Pella	6	7^{7}	7
Q	(Colombia) DE Galán	3	6^{4}	5
(Finland) E Ruusuvuori	6	3	6^{4}	3
Q	(United States) M McDonald	4	6	7^{7}	6
(Argentina) JI Londero	6	4	6^{6}	2
22	(Chile) C Garín	3	6	7^{8}	6
32	(United States) R Opelka	6	6	6
(Slovakia) A Martin	3	2	4
(Spain) J Munar	6^{6}	6	7^{7}	6
(Australia) J Thompson	7^{8}	1	6^{5}	4
(United States) T Paul	6	6	4	4	10
WC	(Australia) C O'Connell	2	4	6	6	8
(Kazakhstan) A Bublik	3	3	5
2	(Russia) D Medvedev	6	6	7

Second round
(United States) M Giron	7^{7}	6	6^{3}	6
(Argentina) G Pella	6^{2}	1	7^{7}	4
Q	(United States) M McDonald	6	6	6^{7}	3	6
22	(Chile) C Garín	4	4	7^{9}	6	8
32	(United States) R Opelka	6	6	3	7
(Spain) J Munar	3	2	6	5
(United States) T Paul	6	1	4	3
2	(Russia) D Medvedev	3	6	6	6

Third round
(United States) M Giron	1	7	2	2
22	(Chile) C Garín	6	5	6	6
32	(United States) R Opelka	4	2	4
2	(Russia) D Medvedev	6	6	6

Fourth round
22	(Chile) C Garín	2	1	5
2	(Russia) D Medvedev	6	6	7

== Seeded players ==
The following are the seeded players. Seedings are based on ATP rankings as of 24 May 2021. Rankings and points before are as of 31 May 2021. Because the tournament was moved a week, points of the week of 10 June 2019 include results from Stuttgart and 's-Hertogenbosch.

As announced by the ATP in March 2021, tournaments from 4 March to 4 August 2019 points due to COVID ranking adjustments will count 50%, including their 2020 points whichever is greater. 2019 points which are higher will still be dropped as normal. Accordingly, the higher of each player's 2019 or 2020 points will be replaced by his 2021 points at the end of the tournament. Note that this is a different ranking adjustment system than the one being used by the WTA for the women's event.

Seed	Rank	Player	Points before	2019 points	2020 points	Points won	Points after	Status
1	1	(Serbia) Novak Djokovic	11,313	720	1,200	2,000	12,113	Champion, defeated (Greece) Stefanos Tsitsipas [5]
2	2	(Russia) Daniil Medvedev	9,793	10+10	10	360	10,143	Quarterfinal lost to (Greece) Stefanos Tsitsipas [5]
3	3	(Spain) Rafael Nadal	9,630	2,000	2,000	720	8,630	Semifinal lost to (Serbia) Novak Djokovic [1]
4	4	(Austria) Dominic Thiem	8,445	1,200	360	10	7,425	First round lost to (Spain) Pablo Andújar
5	5	(Greece) Stefanos Tsitsipas	7,500	180+10	720	1,200	7,980	Runner-up, lost to (Serbia) Novak Djokovic [1]
6	6	(Germany) Alexander Zverev	6,990	360	180	720	7,350	Semifinals lost to (Greece) Stefanos Tsitsipas [5]
7	7	(Russia) Andrey Rublev	6,090	0	360	10	5,910	First round lost to (Germany) Jan-Lennard Struff
8	8	(Switzerland) Roger Federer	5,605	720	0	180	5,065	Fourth round withdrew due to physical condition concerns
9	9	(Italy) Matteo Berrettini	3,958	45+250	90	360	4,103	Quarterfinal lost to (Serbia) Novak Djokovic [1]
10	10	(Argentina) Diego Schwartzman	3,465	45	720	360	3,105	Quarterfinals lost to (Spain) Rafael Nadal [3]
11	11	(Spain) Roberto Bautista Agut	3,215	90	90	45	3,170	Second round lost to (Switzerland) Henri Laaksonen [Q]
12	12	(Spain) Pablo Carreño Busta	3,085	90	360	180	2,905	Fourth round lost to (Greece) Stefanos Tsitsipas [5]
13	13	(Belgium) David Goffin	2,875	90+45	10	10	2,830	First round lost to (Italy) Lorenzo Musetti
14	15	(France) Gaël Monfils	2,713	180+20	10	45	2,568	Second round lost to (Sweden) Mikael Ymer
15	16	(Norway) Casper Ruud	2,690	90	90	90	2,690	Third round lost to (Spain) Alejandro Davidovich Fokina
16	17	(Bulgaria) Grigor Dimitrov	2,521	90	180	10	2,431	First round retired against (United States) Marcos Giron
~~17~~	~~18~~	~~(Canada) Milos Raonic~~	2,518	0+90	0	0	2,473	Withdrew for personal reasons
18	19	(Italy) Jannik Sinner	2,500	(48)^{†}	360	180	2,320	Fourth round lost to (Spain) Rafael Nadal [3]
19	20	(Poland) Hubert Hurkacz	2,498	10	10	10	2,533	First round lost to (Netherlands) Botic van de Zandschulp [Q]
20	21	(Canada) Félix Auger-Aliassime	2,423	0+150	10	10	2,423	First round lost to (Italy) Andreas Seppi
21	22	(Australia) Alex de Minaur	2,350	45+45	10	45	2,350	Second round lost to (Italy) Marco Cecchinato
22	23	(Chile) Cristian Garín	2,350	45+45	90	180	2,440	Fourth round lost to (Russia) Daniil Medvedev [2]
23	25	(Russia) Karen Khachanov	2,280	360+10	180	45	2,010	Second round lost to (Japan) Kei Nishikori
24	26	(Russia) Aslan Karatsev	2,245	(18)^{†}	16	45	2,274	Second round lost to (Germany) Philipp Kohlschreiber [PR]
25	27	(United Kingdom) Dan Evans	2,195	10+125	10	10	2,106	First round lost to (Serbia) Miomir Kecmanović
26	28	(Italy) Lorenzo Sonego	2,132	10	180	10	2,042	First round lost to (South Africa) Lloyd Harris
27	29	(Italy) Fabio Fognini	1,933	180	10	90	1,843	Third round lost to (Argentina) Federico Delbonis
28	31	(Georgia (country)) Nikoloz Basilashvili	1,785	10+10	10	45	1,820	Second round lost to (Spain) Carlos Alcaraz [Q]
29	32	(France) Ugo Humbert	1,780	10	10	10	1,815	First round lost to (Lithuania) Ričardas Berankis
30	33	(United States) Taylor Fritz	1,760	45	90	45	1,715	Second round lost to (Germany) Dominik Koepfer
31	34	(United States) John Isner	1,730	0	45	90	1,775	Third round lost to (Greece) Stefanos Tsitsipas [5]
32	35	(United States) Reilly Opelka	1,726	10	10	90	1,806	Third round lost to (Russia) Daniil Medvedev [2]

† The player did not qualify for the tournament in 2019. Therefore, this represents his points from the 2019 ATP Challenger Tour.

=== Withdrawn players ===
The following players would have been seeded, but withdrew before the tournament began.

Rank	Player	Points before	2019 points	2020 points	Points lost	Points after	Withdrawal reason
14	(Canada) Denis Shapovalov	2,780	10	45	–	2,780	Shoulder injury
24	(Switzerland) Stan Wawrinka	2,281	360	90	315	1,966	Foot injury
30	(Croatia) Borna Ćorić	1,870	90+90	10	112	1,758	Shoulder surgery

== Other entry information ==
=== Wild cards ===
The following players were awarded wild cards into the main draw.

- (France) Grégoire Barrère
- (France) Benjamin Bonzi
- (France) Mathias Bourgue
- (France) Arthur Cazaux
- (France) Enzo Couacaud
- (France) Hugo Gaston
- (Australia) Christopher O'Connell
- (France) Arthur Rinderknech

=== Protected ranking ===
- (Chinese Taipei) Lu Yen-hsun (71)
- (Germany) Philipp Kohlschreiber (96)
- (Poland) Kamil Majchrzak (105)

=== Qualifiers ===
- (Spain) Carlos Alcaraz
- (United States) Jenson Brooksby
- (Japan) Taro Daniel
- (United States) Bjorn Fratangelo
- (Colombia) Daniel Elahi Galán
- (Italy) Alessandro Giannessi
- (Uzbekistan) Denis Istomin
- (Switzerland) Henri Laaksonen
- (Germany) Maximilian Marterer
- (United States) Mackenzie McDonald
- (Germany) Oscar Otte
- (Russia) Roman Safiullin
- (Spain) Carlos Taberner
- (Spain) Mario Vilella Martínez
- (Netherlands) Botic van de Zandschulp
- (Spain) Bernabé Zapata Miralles

=== Lucky losers ===
- (Argentina) Francisco Cerúndolo
- (Germany) Peter Gojowczyk

=== Withdrawals ===
- ‡ (Australia) Nick Kyrgios (57) → replaced by (Argentina) Facundo Bagnis (103)
- ‡ (Croatia) Borna Ćorić (26) → replaced by (Slovakia) Andrej Martin (104)
- ‡ (United Kingdom) Kyle Edmund (69) → replaced by (Spain) Roberto Carballés Baena (105)
- ‡ (Switzerland) Stan Wawrinka (20) → replaced by (Poland) Kamil Majchrzak (105 PR)
- ‡ (Hungary) Attila Balázs (102) → replaced by (Portugal) João Sousa (106)
- ‡ (Canada) Vasek Pospisil (64) → replaced by (South Africa) Kevin Anderson (107)
- ‡ (Canada) Denis Shapovalov (13) → replaced by (Japan) Yasutaka Uchiyama (108) (Note: Last direct acceptance)
- § (Canada) Milos Raonic (19) → replaced by (Argentina) Francisco Cerúndolo (LL)
- § (Australia) John Millman (44) → replaced by (Germany) Peter Gojowczyk (LL)

‡ – withdrew from entry list
§ – withdrew from main draw

== Championship match statistics ==
Category	Djokovic	Tsitsipas
1st serve %	91 of 134 = 68%	109 of 177 = 62%
Aces	5	14
Double faults	3	4
Winners	56	61
Unforced errors	41	44
Winners − Unforced errors	+15	+17
Winning % on 1st serve	71 of 91 = 78%	73 of 109 = 67%
Winning % on 2nd serve	23 of 43 = 53%	34 of 68 = 50%
Receiving points won	70 of 177 = 40%	40 of 134 = 30%
Break point conversions	5 of 16 = 31%	3 of 8 = 38%
Net points won	19 of 30 = 63%	19 of 31 = 61%
Total points won	164	147
Fastest serve	198 km/h (123 mph)	205 km/h (127 mph)
Average 1st serve speed	177 km/h (110 mph)	186 km/h (116 mph)
Average 2nd serve speed	140 km/h (87 mph)	152 km/h (94 mph)

_{Source}

== Explanatory notes ==
Preceded by 2021 Australian Open – Men's singles	Grand Slam men's singles	Succeeded by 2021 Wimbledon Championships – Men's singles
