= Wheelchair tennis at the 2024 Summer Paralympics =

- Paralympic Wheelchair Tennis
- Date: 30 August – 7 September 2024
- Edition: 10th
- Category: Super Series
- Location: Roland Garros Stadium

Champions

Men's singles
- Tokito Oda (JPN)

Women's singles
- Yui Kamiji (JPN)

Men's doubles
- Alfie Hewett (GBR) / Gordon Reid (GBR)

Women's doubles
- Yui Kamiji (JPN) / Manami Tanaka (JPN)

Quad singles
- Niels Vink (NED)

Quad doubles
- Sam Schröder (NED) / Niels Vink (NED)
- Summer Paralympics

Wheelchair tennis at the 2024 Summer Paralympics in Paris, France ran between 30 August and 7 September. It featured singles and doubles events in men's, women's and quads and it took place at the Roland Garros Stadium on clay surface.

== Qualification ==
An NPC can enter a total maximum of eleven qualification slots:

- four male and female athletes in men's and women's singles events.
- three athletes in quads singles.
- two men's and women's teams in the doubles events.
- one team in the quads doubles.

The qualification slots are allocated to the individual athletes, not the NPC. All athletes must also have an official ranking in the Wheelchair Tennis Singles World Ranking list and have been part of a nominated team at a World Team Cup event, minimum of two years between 2021 and 2024, one of those should be in either 2023 or 2024.

§ : qualified for doubles

Means of qualification	Date	Venue	Male	Female	Quads
2023 European Para Championships	8–20 August 2023	(Netherlands) Rotterdam	Netherlands	Netherlands	—N/a
2023 African Para Games	3–12 September 2023	(Ghana) Accra	South Africa	Morocco	—N/a
2022 Asian Para Games	22–28 October 2023	(China) Hangzhou	Japan	Japan	—N/a
2023 Parapan American Games	17–25 November 2023	(Chile) Santiago	Argentina	United States	—N/a
Singles World Ranking Allocation	15 July 2024	—N/a	Austria; Belgium; Brazil; Brazil; Chile; China; China; Costa Rica; France; France; France; France; Great Britain; Great Britain; Great Britain; Great Britain; Israel; Italy; Japan; Japan; Japan; Malaysia; Netherlands; Netherlands; Netherlands; South Korea; Spain; Spain; Spain; Sri Lanka; United States; United States	Argentina; Chile; China^{§} China^{§} China^{§} China^{§} Colombia^{§} France^{§} France^{§} France^{§} Germany; Great Britain^{§} Japan^{§} Japan^{§} Japan^{§} Netherlands^{§} Netherlands^{§} Netherlands^{§} South Africa^{§} Switzerland	Australia; Brazil^{§} Canada; Chile^{§} Chile^{§} Great Britain^{§} Israel; Netherlands^{§} Netherlands^{§} South Africa^{§} Turkey^{§} United States
Bipartite Commission Invitation	23 July 2024	—N/a	12	France^{§} Great Britain^{§} Israel; Japan^{§} Netherlands^{§} Morocco^{§} Morocco^{§} Colombia^{§} Thailand; South Africa^{§}	Brazil^{§} Great Britain^{§} South Africa^{§} Turkey^{§}

== Medalists ==
Event	Gold	Silver	Bronze
Men's singles	Tokito Oda; Japan	Alfie Hewett; Great Britain	Gustavo Fernández; Argentina
Men's doubles	Great Britain; Alfie Hewett; Gordon Reid	Japan; Tokito Oda; Takuya Miki	Spain; Martín de la Puente; Daniel Caverzaschi
Women's singles	Yui Kamiji; Japan	Diede de Groot; Netherlands	Aniek van Koot; Netherlands
Women's doubles	Japan; Yui Kamiji; Manami Tanaka	Netherlands; Diede de Groot; Aniek van Koot	China; Guo Luoyao; Wang Ziying
Quad singles	Niels Vink; Netherlands	Sam Schröder; Netherlands	Guy Sasson; Israel
Quad doubles	Netherlands; Sam Schröder; Niels Vink	Great Britain; Andy Lapthorne; Gregory Slade	South Africa; Donald Ramphadi; Lucas Sithole

== Medal table ==
* Host nation (France)

Rank	NPC	Gold	Silver	Bronze	Total
1	Japan	3	1	0	4
2	Netherlands	2	3	1	6
3	Great Britain	1	2	0	3
4	Argentina	0	0	1	1
4	China	0	0	1	1
4	Israel	0	0	1	1
4	South Africa	0	0	1	1
4	Spain	0	0	1	1
Totals (8 entries)		6	6	6	18

== See also ==
- Tennis at the 2024 Summer Olympics
