= 2025 Wimbledon Championships =

- 2025 Wimbledon poster illustrated and designed by Sarah Madden, Leeds, UK.
- Date: 30 June – 13 July 2025
- Edition: 138th
- Category: Grand Slam (ITF)
- Draw: 128S / 64D / 32XD
- Prize money: £53,550,000
- Surface: Grass
- Location: Church Road; SW19, Wimbledon, London, England
- Venue: All England Lawn Tennis and Croquet Club

Champions

Men's singles
- (Italy) Jannik Sinner

Women's singles
- (Poland) Iga Świątek

Men's doubles
- (United Kingdom) Julian Cash / (United Kingdom) Lloyd Glasspool

Women's doubles
- Veronika Kudermetova / (Belgium) Elise Mertens

Mixed doubles
- (Netherlands) Sem Verbeek / (Czech Republic) Kateřina Siniaková

Wheelchair men's singles
- (Japan) Tokito Oda

Wheelchair women's singles
- (China) Wang Ziying

Wheelchair quad singles
- (Netherlands) Niels Vink

Wheelchair men's doubles
- (Spain) Martín de la Puente / (Netherlands) Ruben Spaargaren

Wheelchair women's doubles
- (China) Li Xiaohui / (China) Wang Ziying

Wheelchair quad doubles
- (Israel) Guy Sasson / (Netherlands) Niels Vink

Boys' singles
- (Bulgaria) Ivan Ivanov

Girls' singles
- (Slovakia) Mia Pohánková

Boys' doubles
- (Finland) Oskari Paldanius / (Poland) Alan Ważny

Girls' doubles
- (United States) Kristina Penickova / (Czech Republic) Vendula Valdmannová

Boys' 14&U singles
- (Austria) Moritz Freitag

Girls' 14&U singles
- (Japan) Sakino Miyazawa

Gentlemen's invitation doubles
- (United States) Bob Bryan / (United States) Mike Bryan

Ladies' invitation doubles
- (Zimbabwe) Cara Black / (Switzerland) Martina Hingis

Mixed invitation doubles
- (Sweden) Thomas Johansson / (United Kingdom) Katie O'Brien
- Wimbledon Championships

The 2025 Wimbledon Championships was a Grand Slam tennis tournament which took place at the All England Lawn Tennis and Croquet Club in Wimbledon, London, England from 30 June to 13 July with the preliminary rounds played from 23 to 26 June. It consisted of singles, doubles, mixed doubles, junior, wheelchair and Invitational tournaments play.

It was the 138th edition of the Wimbledon Championships and the third major tournament of 2025. For the first time in Wimbledon's history, line judges were replaced with automated electronic line judges.

The women's and men's singles finals, held on the second Saturday and Sunday, began at 4:00 PM instead of the traditional 2:00 PM start time, and both finals were scheduled as the last matches of the day. The organisers stated that these adjustments aimed to enhance viewership in North and South America.

== Tournament ==
The defending champion of the Men's singles draw was the Spanish player, Carlos Alcaraz, who lost in the final to Jannik Sinner, who became the first Italian Wimbledon singles champion in the Open Era. The women's singles defending champion was Barbora Krejčíková from the Czech Republic, but she lost in the third round to Emma Navarro. Iga Świątek won against Amanda Anisimova in the final and became the first Polish Wimbledon singles champion in the Open Era.

In the men's and women's singles, a total of eight top-10 seeds were eliminated in the first round, the most at a Grand Slam event in the Open Era.

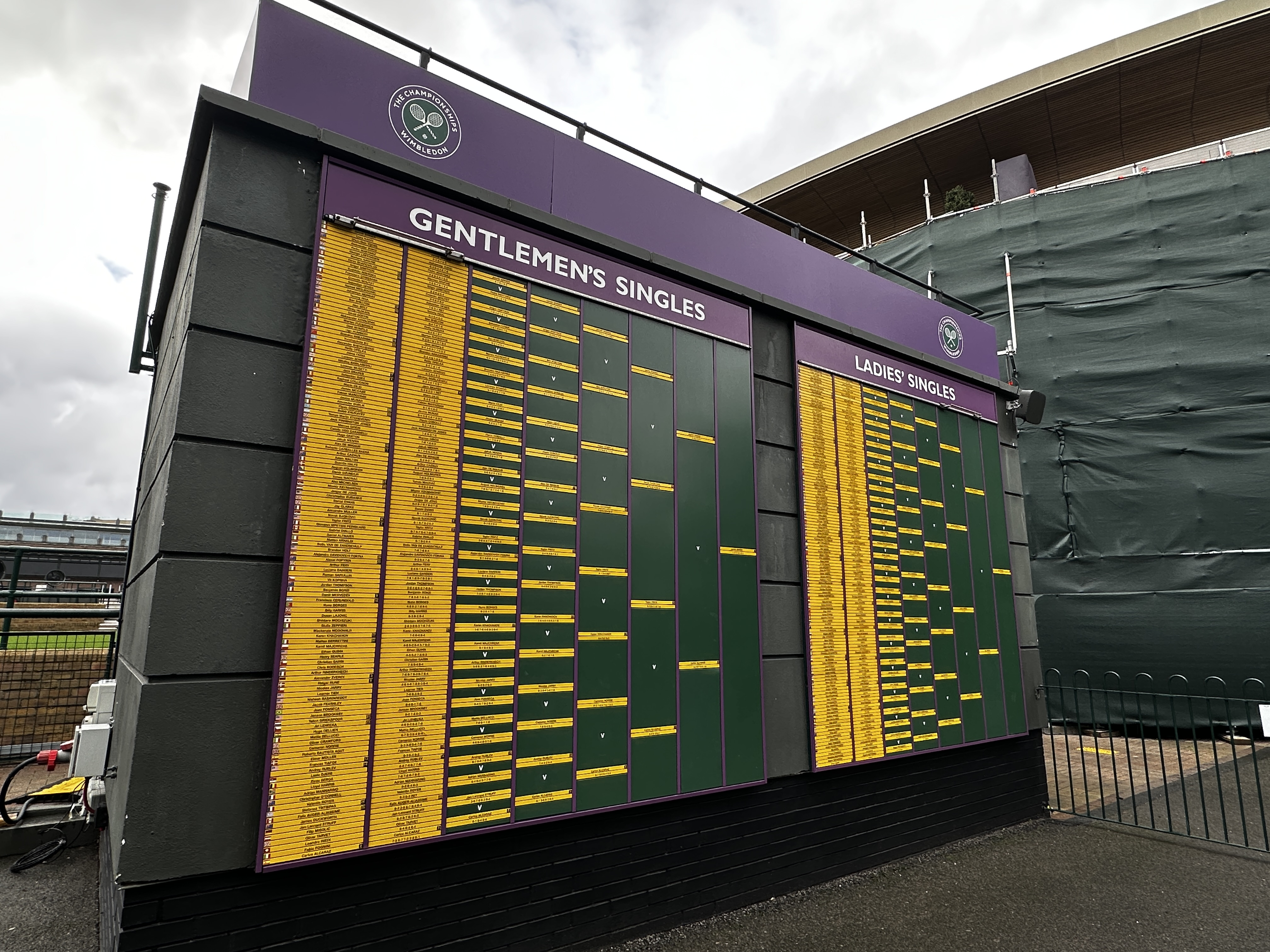
2025 Ladies' and Gentlemen's singles Wimbledon Championships draws and scoreboards

== Singles players ==
- Gentlemen's singles

Gentlemen's singles players
Champion		Runner-up	
(Italy) Jannik Sinner [1]		(Spain) Carlos Alcaraz [2]	
Semifinals out
(Serbia) Novak Djokovic [6]		(United States) Taylor Fritz [5]	
Quarterfinals out
(United States) Ben Shelton [10]	(Italy) Flavio Cobolli [22]	Karen Khachanov [17]	(United Kingdom) Cameron Norrie
4th round out
(Bulgaria) Grigor Dimitrov [19]	(Italy) Lorenzo Sonego	(Croatia) Marin Čilić	(Australia) Alex de Minaur [11]
(Australia) Jordan Thompson	(Poland) Kamil Majchrzak	(Chile) Nicolás Jarry (Q)	Andrey Rublev [14]
3rd round out
(Spain) Pedro Martínez	(Austria) Sebastian Ofner (PR)	(Hungary) Márton Fucsovics (LL)	(United States) Brandon Nakashima [29]
(Spain) Jaume Munar	(Czech Republic) Jakub Menšík [15]	(Denmark) August Holmgren (Q)	(Serbia) Miomir Kecmanović
(Spain) Alejandro Davidovich Fokina [26]	(Italy) Luciano Darderi	(Portugal) Nuno Borges	(France) Arthur Rinderknech
(Brazil) João Fonseca	(Italy) Mattia Bellucci	(France) Adrian Mannarino (Q)	(Germany) Jan-Lennard Struff
2nd round out
(Australia) Aleksandar Vukic	(Argentina) Mariano Navone	(France) Corentin Moutet	(United States) Tommy Paul [13]
(Australia) Rinky Hijikata	(France) Gaël Monfils	(United States) Reilly Opelka	(Georgia (country)) Nikoloz Basilashvili (Q)
(United Kingdom) Jack Draper [4]	(Hungary) Fábián Marozsán	(United Kingdom) Jack Pinnington Jones (WC)	(United States) Marcos Giron
(France) Arthur Cazaux (Q)	(Czech Republic) Tomáš Macháč [21]	(Netherlands) Jesper de Jong	(United Kingdom) Dan Evans (WC)
(Canada) Gabriel Diallo	(Netherlands) Botic van de Zandschulp	(United Kingdom) Arthur Fery (WC)	(France) Benjamin Bonzi
(United Kingdom) Billy Harris	(Japan) Shintaro Mochizuki (Q)	(United States) Ethan Quinn	(Chile) Cristian Garín (LL)
(United States) Learner Tien	(United States) Jenson Brooksby (PR)	(Czech Republic) Jiří Lehečka [23]	(United States) Frances Tiafoe [12]
(South Africa) Lloyd Harris (PR)	(France) Valentin Royer (Q)	(Canada) Félix Auger-Aliassime [25]	(United Kingdom) Oliver Tarvet (Q)
1st round out
(Italy) Luca Nardi	(Chinese Taipei) Tseng Chun-hsin	(United Kingdom) George Loffhagen (WC)	(Canada) Denis Shapovalov [27]
(Japan) Yoshihito Nishioka	(Argentina) Francisco Comesaña	(Serbia) Hamad Medjedovic	(United Kingdom) Johannus Monday (WC)
(Australia) Alex Bolt (Q)	(Belgium) David Goffin	(United States) Aleksandar Kovacevic	(France) Ugo Humbert [18]
(China) Bu Yunchaokete	(Kazakhstan) Alexander Shevchenko	(Portugal) Jaime Faria (Q)	(Italy) Lorenzo Musetti [7]
(Argentina) Sebastián Báez	(Belgium) Raphaël Collignon	(Australia) James McCabe (Q)	(Kazakhstan) Alexander Bublik [28]
(Kazakhstan) Beibit Zhukayev (Q)	(Argentina) Tomás Martín Etcheverry	(Argentina) Camilo Ugo Carabelli	(France) Hugo Gaston
(Spain) Roberto Carballés Baena	(Australia) Adam Walton	(France) Quentin Halys	(Bosnia and Herzegovina) Damir Džumhur
(United States) Alex Michelsen [30]	(United States) Christopher Eubanks	(United Kingdom) Jay Clarke (WC)	(France) Alexandre Müller
(France) Giovanni Mpetshi Perricard	(Germany) Daniel Altmaier	(Italy) Matteo Arnaldi	(United States) Brandon Holt
(Australia) Alexei Popyrin [20]	Roman Safiullin	(Czech Republic) Vít Kopřiva	Daniil Medvedev [9]
(Argentina) Francisco Cerúndolo [16]	(Serbia) Dušan Lajović (LL)	(Italy) Giulio Zeppieri (Q)	(United States) Mackenzie McDonald
(Italy) Matteo Berrettini [32]	(United Kingdom) Henry Searle (WC)	(Luxembourg) Chris Rodesch (Q)	(Germany) Alexander Zverev [3]
(Denmark) Holger Rune [8]	(United States) Nishesh Basavareddy	(United Kingdom) Jacob Fearnley	(Netherlands) Tallon Griekspoor [31]
(Bolivia) Hugo Dellien	(United Kingdom) Oliver Crawford (WC)	(Spain) Roberto Bautista Agut	(Denmark) Elmer Møller
(Serbia) Laslo Djere	(Belgium) Zizou Bergs	(Australia) Christopher O'Connell	(Greece) Stefanos Tsitsipas [24]
(Australia) James Duckworth	(Austria) Filip Misolic (Q)	(Switzerland) Leandro Riedi (Q)	(Italy) Fabio Fognini

- Ladies' singles

Ladies' singles players
Champion		Runner-up	
(Poland) Iga Świątek [8]		(United States) Amanda Anisimova [13]	
Semifinals out
Aryna Sabalenka [1]		(Switzerland) Belinda Bencic	
Quarterfinals out
(Germany) Laura Siegemund	Anastasia Pavlyuchenkova	Mirra Andreeva [7]	Liudmila Samsonova [19]
4th round out
(Belgium) Elise Mertens [24]	(Argentina) Solana Sierra (LL)	(Czech Republic) Linda Nosková [30]	(United Kingdom) Sonay Kartal
(United States) Emma Navarro [10]	Ekaterina Alexandrova [18]	(Denmark) Clara Tauson [23]	(Spain) Jéssica Bouzas Maneiro
3rd round out
(United Kingdom) Emma Raducanu	(Ukraine) Elina Svitolina [14]	(Spain) Cristina Bucșa	(United States) Madison Keys [6]
Kamilla Rakhimova	(Hungary) Dalma Gálfi	(France) Diane Parry (Q)	(Japan) Naomi Osaka
(United States) Hailey Baptiste	(Czech Republic) Barbora Krejčíková [17]	(Turkey) Zeynep Sönmez	(Italy) Elisabetta Cocciaretto
(United States) Danielle Collins	(Kazakhstan) Elena Rybakina [11]	(Australia) Daria Kasatkina [16]	(Ukraine) Dayana Yastremska
2nd round out
(Czech Republic) Marie Bouzková	(Czech Republic) Markéta Vondroušová	(United States) Ann Li	Aliaksandra Sasnovich (Q)
(United Kingdom) Katie Boulter	(Croatia) Donna Vekić [22]	(Canada) Leylah Fernandez [29]	(Serbia) Olga Danilović
(Italy) Jasmine Paolini [4]	(Germany) Eva Lys	(Brazil) Beatriz Haddad Maia [21]	(Mexico) Renata Zarazúa
Diana Shnaider [12]	(Bulgaria) Viktoriya Tomova	(United States) Ashlyn Krueger [31]	(Czech Republic) Kateřina Siniaková
(Italy) Lucia Bronzetti	(Canada) Victoria Mboko (LL)	(United States) Caroline Dolehide	Veronika Kudermetova
(China) Wang Xinyu	(Netherlands) Suzan Lamens	(France) Elsa Jacquemot (Q)	(United States) Katie Volynets
(United States) Caty McNally (PR)	(Slovenia) Veronika Erjavec (Q)	Anna Kalinskaya	(Greece) Maria Sakkari
(Romania) Irina-Camelia Begu	(Ukraine) Yuliia Starodubtseva	(United States) Sofia Kenin [28]	Anastasia Zakharova (Q)
1st round out
(Canada) Carson Branstine (Q)	(New Zealand) Lulu Sun	(United Kingdom) Mingge Xu (WC)	(United States) McCartney Kessler [32]
(Czech Republic) Linda Fruhvirtová (Q)	(Switzerland) Viktorija Golubic	(France) Varvara Gracheva	(Hungary) Anna Bondár
(Spain) Paula Badosa [9]	(Australia) Olivia Gadecki	(Romania) Anca Todoni	(Australia) Kimberly Birrell
(United Kingdom) Hannah Klugman (WC)	(United States) Peyton Stearns	(China) Zhang Shuai (Q)	(Romania) Elena-Gabriela Ruse
(Latvia) Anastasija Sevastova (PR)	(Japan) Aoi Ito	(China) Yuan Yue	(United States) Bernarda Pera
(Slovakia) Rebecca Šramková	(United Kingdom) Harriet Dart (WC)	(Belgium) Yanina Wickmayer (PR)	(Kazakhstan) Yulia Putintseva
(Japan) Moyuka Uchijima	(Croatia) Petra Martić (Q)	(Tunisia) Ons Jabeur	(Latvia) Jeļena Ostapenko [20]
(United Kingdom) Mika Stojsavljevic (WC)	(Australia) Ajla Tomljanović	(Australia) Talia Gibson (Q)	(China) Zheng Qinwen [5]
(Egypt) Mayar Sherif	(Switzerland) Jil Teichmann	(Romania) Sorana Cîrstea (PR)	(Poland) Magdalena Fręch [25]
(Philippines) Alexandra Eala	(Netherlands) Arantxa Rus	(China) Zhu Lin (PR)	(Czech Republic) Petra Kvitová (WC)
(Czech Republic) Karolína Muchová [15]	(Romania) Jaqueline Cristian	(United States) Iva Jovic (Q)	(Australia) Priscilla Hon (Q)
(Poland) Magda Linette [27]	(United States) Alycia Parks	(Germany) Tatjana Maria	(United States) Jessica Pegula [3]
Polina Kudermetova	(United Kingdom) Jodie Burrage (WC)	(Colombia) Camila Osorio	(Ukraine) Marta Kostyuk [26]
(United Kingdom) Heather Watson (WC)	(Serbia) Nina Stojanović (Q)	Anna Blinkova	(Armenia) Elina Avanesyan
(Colombia) Emiliana Arango	(Slovenia) Kaja Juvan (Q)	(United Kingdom) Francesca Jones (WC)	(Australia) Maya Joint
(United States) Taylor Townsend (Q)	(Germany) Ella Seidel (Q)	Victoria Azarenka	(United States) Coco Gauff [2]

== Events ==
=== Gentlemen's singles ===
- (Italy) Jannik Sinner defeated (Spain) Carlos Alcaraz, 4–6, 6–4, 6–4, 6–4

=== Ladies' singles ===
- (Poland) Iga Świątek defeated (United States) Amanda Anisimova, 6–0, 6–0

=== Gentlemen's doubles ===
- (United Kingdom) Julian Cash / (United Kingdom) Lloyd Glasspool defeated (Australia) Rinky Hijikata / (Netherlands) David Pel, 6–2, 7–6^{(7–3)}

=== Ladies' doubles ===
- Veronika Kudermetova / (Belgium) Elise Mertens defeated (Chinese Taipei) Hsieh Su-wei / (Latvia) Jeļena Ostapenko, 3–6, 6–2, 6–4

=== Mixed doubles ===
- (Netherlands) Sem Verbeek / (Czech Republic) Kateřina Siniaková defeated (United Kingdom) Joe Salisbury / (Brazil) Luisa Stefani, 7–6^{(7–3)}, 7–6^{(7–3)}

=== Wheelchair gentlemen's singles ===
- (Japan) Tokito Oda defeated (United Kingdom) Alfie Hewett, 3–6, 7–5, 6–2

=== Wheelchair ladies' singles ===
- (China) Wang Ziying defeated (Japan) Yui Kamiji, 6–3, 6–3

=== Wheelchair quad singles ===
- (Netherlands) Niels Vink defeated (Netherlands) Sam Schröder, 6–3, 6–3

=== Wheelchair gentlemen's doubles ===
- (Spain) Martín de la Puente / (Netherlands) Ruben Spaargaren defeated (United Kingdom) Alfie Hewett / (United Kingdom) Gordon Reid, 7–6^{(7–1)}, 7–5

=== Wheelchair ladies' doubles ===
- (China) Li Xiaohui / (China) Wang Ziying defeated (Colombia) Angélica Bernal / (France) Ksénia Chasteau, 6–3, 6–1

=== Wheelchair quad doubles ===
- (Israel) Guy Sasson / (Netherlands) Niels Vink defeated (South Africa) Donald Ramphadi / (United Kingdom) Gregory Slade, 6–0, 6–2

=== Boys' singles ===
- (Bulgaria) Ivan Ivanov defeated (United States) Ronit Karki, 6–2, 6–3

=== Girls' singles ===
- (Slovakia) Mia Pohánková defeated (United States) Julieta Pareja, 6–3, 6–1

=== Boys' doubles ===
- (Finland) Oskari Paldanius / (Poland) Alan Ważny defeated (United Kingdom) Oliver Bonding / (United States) Jagger Leach, 5–7, 7–6^{(8–6)}, [10–5]

=== Girls' doubles ===
- (United States) Kristina Penickova / (Czech Republic) Vendula Valdmannová defeated (United States) Thea Frodin / (United States) Julieta Pareja, 6–4, 6–2

=== Boys' 14&U singles ===
- (Austria) Moritz Freitag defeated (Greece) Rafael Pagonis, 4–6, 6–1, [10–4]

=== Girls' 14&U singles ===
- (Japan) Sakino Miyazawa defeated (Ukraine) Sofiia Bielinska, 3–6, 7–5, [10–5]

=== Gentlemen's invitation doubles ===
- (United States) Bob Bryan / (United States) Mike Bryan defeated (Australia) Lleyton Hewitt / (Australia) Mark Philippoussis, 6–1, 5–7, [10–3]

=== Ladies' invitation doubles ===
- (Zimbabwe) Cara Black / (Switzerland) Martina Hingis defeated (Slovakia) Dominika Cibulková / (Czech Republic) Barbora Strýcová, 6–2, 6–3

=== Mixed invitation doubles ===
- (Sweden) Thomas Johansson / (United Kingdom) Katie O'Brien defeated (France) Sébastien Grosjean / (Croatia) Iva Majoli, 6–2, 6–2

== Point and prize money distribution ==
=== Point distribution ===
Below are the tables with the point distribution for each phase of the tournament.

==== Senior points ====
Event	W	F	SF	QF	Round of 16	Round of 32	Round of 64	Round of 128	Q	Q3	Q2	Q1
Men's singles	2000	1300	800	400	200	100	50	10	30	16	8	0
Men's doubles	2000	1200	720	360	180	90	0	N/A				
Women's singles	2000	1300	780	430	240	130	70	10	40	30	20	2
Women's doubles	2000	1300	780	430	240	130	10	N/A				

==== Wheelchair points ====
Event	W	F	SF	QF	Round of 16
Singles	800	500	375	200	100
Doubles	800	500	375	100	N/A
Quad singles	800	500	375	200	100
Quad doubles	800	500	375	100	N/A

==== Junior points ====
Event	W	F	SF	QF	Round of 16	Round of 32	Q	Q3
Boys' singles	1000	600	370	200	100	45	30	20
Girls' singles	1000	600	370	200	100	45	30	20
Boys' doubles	750	450	275	150	75	—N/a	—N/a	—N/a
Girls' doubles	750	450	275	150	75	—N/a	—N/a	—N/a

=== Prize money ===
The Wimbledon Championships total prize money for 2025 is £53,550,000, an increase of 7.0% from the 2024 edition. The men's and women's singles champions each receive £3,000,000, a rise of 11.11% compared to 2024.

Edition 2025	W	F	SF	QF	Round of 16	Round of 32	Round of 64	Round of 128^{1}	Q3	Q2	Q1
Singles	£3,000,000	£1,520,000	£775,000	£400,000	£240,000	£152,000	£99,000	£66,000	£41,500	£26,000	£15,500
Doubles *	£680,000	£345,000	£174,000	£87,500	£43,750	£26,000	£16,500	—N/a	—N/a	—N/a	—N/a
Mixed Doubles *	£135,000	£68,000	£34,000	£17,500	£9,000	£4,500	—N/a	—N/a	—N/a	—N/a	—N/a
Wheelchair Singles	£68,000	£36,000	£24,000	£16,250	£10,750	—N/a	—N/a	—N/a	—N/a	—N/a	—N/a
Wheelchair Doubles *	£30,000	£15,000	£9,000	£5,500	—N/a	—N/a	—N/a	—N/a	—N/a	—N/a	—N/a
Quad Singles	£68,000	£36,000	£24,000	£16,250	—N/a	—N/a	—N/a	—N/a	—N/a	—N/a	—N/a
Quad Doubles *	£28,000	£14,000	£9,000	—N/a	—N/a	—N/a	—N/a	—N/a	—N/a	—N/a	—N/a

*per team

Preceded by 2024 Wimbledon Championships	Wimbledon Championships	Succeeded by 2026 Wimbledon Championships
Preceded by 2025 French Open	Grand Slam events	Succeeded by 2025 US Open
