= Argentina at the 2024 Summer Paralympics =

- Flag of Argentina
- IPC code: ARG
- NPC: Argentine Paralympic Committee

in Paris, France August 28, 2024 – September 8, 2024
- Competitors: 68 (38 men and 30 women) in 14 sports
- Flag bearers: Hernan Barreto; Coty Garrone
- Medals Ranked 37th: Gold 2 Silver 3 Bronze 8 Total 13

Summer Paralympics appearances (overview)
- 1960; 1964; 1968; 1972; 1976; 1980; 1984; 1988; 1992; 1996; 2000; 2004; 2008; 2012; 2016; 2020; 2024

Argentina competed at the 2024 Summer Paralympics in Paris, France, from 28 August to 8 September.

The country claimed a total of 13 medals, making a great improvement in comparison with recent Paralympic Games. It was the best Argentinian Paralympic performance since 1980.

== Medalists ==
The following Argentine competitors won medals at the games. In the discipline sections below, the medalists' names are bolded.

Medal	Name	Sport	Event	Date
Gold	Iñaki Basiloff	Swimming	Men's 200 m individual medley SM7	31 August
Gold	Brian Lionel Impellizzeri	Athletics	Men's long jump T37	3 September
Silver	Hernan Emanuel Urra	Athletics	Men's shot put F35	5 September
Silver	Darío Lencina; Angel Garcia; Nahuel Heredia; Froilan Padilla; Jesus Merlos; Matias Olivera; Maximiliano Espinillo; Osvaldo Fernández; Mario Ríos; Germán Muleck	Blind football	Men's team	7 September
Silver	Alexis Sebastian Chavez	Athletics	Men's 100 m T36	7 September
Bronze	Antonella Ruiz Diaz	Athletics	Women's shot put F41	30 August
Bronze	Juan Samorano	Taekwondo	Men's −70 kg	30 August
Bronze	Fernando Vázquez	Athletics	Men's long jump T12	2 September
Bronze	Iñaki Basiloff	Swimming	Men's 400 m freestyle S7	2 September
Bronze	Alexis Sebastian Chavez	Athletics	Men's 400 m T36	3 September
Bronze	Stefanía Ferrando; Rodrigo Romero	Boccia	Mixed Pairs BC3	5 September
Bronze	Paula Gómez	Judo	Women's 57 kg J1	5 September
Bronze	Gustavo Fernández	Wheelchair tennis	Men's singles	7 September

Medals by sport
Sport	1st place, gold medalist(s)	2nd place, silver medalist(s)	3rd place, bronze medalist(s)	Total
Athletics	1	2	3	**6**
Swimming	1	0	1	**2**
Boccia	0	0	1	**1**
Taekwondo	0	0	1	**1**
Judo	0	0	1	**1**
Wheelchair tennis	0	0	1	**1**
Blind football	0	1	0	**1**
Total	2	3	8	13

Medals by day
Day	Date	1st place, gold medalist(s)	2nd place, silver medalist(s)	3rd place, bronze medalist(s)	Total
1	29 August	0	0	0	**0**
2	30 August	0	0	2	**2**
3	31 August	1	0	0	**1**
4	1 September	0	0	0	**0**
5	2 September	0	0	2	**2**
6	3 September	1	0	1	**2**
7	4 September	0	0	0	**0**
8	5 September	0	1	2	**3**
9	6 September	0	0	0	**0**
10	7 September	0	2	1	**3**
Total		2	3	8	13

Medals by gender
Gender	1st place, gold medalist(s)	2nd place, silver medalist(s)	3rd place, bronze medalist(s)	Total	Percentage
Male	2	2	5	**9**	69,22%
Female	0	0	2	**2**	15,39%
Mixed	0	1	1	**2**	15,39%
Total	2	3	8	13	100%

Multiple medalists
Name	Sport	1st place, gold medalist(s)	2nd place, silver medalist(s)	3rd place, bronze medalist(s)	Total
Iñaki Basiloff	Swimming	1	0	1	**2**
Alexis Sebastian Chavez	Athletics	0	1	1	**2**

== Competitors ==
The following is the list of number of competitors in the Games.

Sport	Men	Women	Total
Athletics	8	11	19
Blind football	10	—N/a	10
Boccia	2	2	4
Cycling	2	2	4
Judo	1	4	5
Paracanoeing	1	1	2
Powerlifting	0	1	1
Rowing	0	1	1
Shooting	0	1	1
Swimming	7	5	12
Table tennis	2	1	3
Taekwondo	2	0	2
Wheelchair fencing	1	0	1
Wheelchair tennis	2	1	3
Total	38	30	68

== Athletics ==
Argentina sent six track and field athletes achieved quota places for the following events based on their results at the 2023 World Championships, 2024 World Championships, or through high performance allocation, as long as they meet the minimum entry standard (MES).

Key

- Note–Ranks given for track events are within the athlete's heat only
- Q = Qualified for the next round
- q = Qualified for the next round as a fastest loser or, in field events, by position without achieving the qualifying target
- DQ = Disqualified
- PR = Paralympic Record
- AR = Area (or continental) Record
- NR = National Record
- SB = Season's Best
- N/A = Round not applicable for the event
- Bye = Athlete not required to compete in round

Track & road events
Men

Athlete	Event	Heat		Final	
Athlete	Event	Result	Rank	Result	Rank
Fernando Vázquez	Men's 100 m T12	DQ (Note: Vázquez's time was 17.8 seconds, however he was disqualified for false starting (0.097s).)	–	Did not advance	
Hernan Barreto	Men's 100 m T35	—N/a		12.41	9
Hernan Barreto	Men's 200 m T35	—N/a		25.53	7
Maximiliano Villa	Men's 100 m T35	—N/a		12.21	7
Maximiliano Villa	Men's 200 m T35	—N/a		25.10	6
Alexis Sebastian Chavez	Men's 100 m T36	11.86	1 Q	11.88 (.871)	2nd place, silver medalist(s)
Alexis Sebastian Chavez	Men's 400 m T36	—N/a		53.60	3rd place, bronze medalist(s)

Women

Athlete	Event	Heat		Final	
Athlete	Event	Result	Rank	Result	Rank
Rosario Trinidad Coppola Molina	Women's 100 m T11	14.05	4	Did not advance	
Candela Cerrudo	Women's 100 m T13	13.51	6	Did not advance	
Araceli Rotela	Women's 200 m T36	30.08	4 Q	29.89	4
Araceli Rotela	Women's 100 m T36	14.63	4 q	14.45	4
Yanina Andrea Martinez	Women's 100 m T36	16.30	7	Did not advance	
Milagros Del Valle Gonzalez	Women's 100 m T38	14.19	9	Did not advance	
Milagros Del Valle Gonzalez	Women's 400 m T38	1:07.92	6	Did not advance	
Teresita Daiana Briozzi	Women's 200 m T47	26.47	5	Did not advance	
Teresita Daiana Briozzi	Women's 400 m T47	1:01.85	5	Did not advance	
Aldana Isabel Ibanez	Women's 100 m T47	13.32	8	Did not advance	

Field events

Men

Athlete	Event	Final	
Athlete	Event	Distance	Position
Fernando Vázquez	Men's long jump T12	6.88	3rd place, bronze medalist(s)
Sergio Markieviche	Men's long jump T36	5.11	9
Brian Lionel Impellizzeri	Men's long jump T37	6.42	1st place, gold medalist(s)
Hernán Emanuel Urra	Men's shot put F35	16.11	2nd place, silver medalist(s)
Pablo Damian Gimenez Reinoso	Men's shot put F57	12.99	6
Pablo Damian Gimenez Reinoso	Men's javelin throw F57	35.84	10

Women

Athlete	Event	Final	
Athlete	Event	Distance	Position
Rosario Trinidad Coppola Molina	Women's long jump T11	4.05	8
Sofia Valentina Casse	Women's long jump T11	3.82	10
Aldana Isabel Ibanez	Women's long jump T47	4.95	10
Marilu Romina Fernandez	Women's club throw F32	21.59	6
Karen Melanie Tassi Sanchez	Women's shot put F37	10.40	7
Karen Melanie Tassi Sanchez	Women's discus throw F38	24.92	12
Antonella Ruiz Diaz	Women's shot put F41	9.58	3rd place, bronze medalist(s)
Antonella Ruiz Diaz	Women's discus throw F41	28.38	7

== Blind football ==
The Argentine men's blind football team qualified for the paralympic games by virtue of top three nation's, not yet qualified, at the 2023 IBSA World Games in Birmingham, Great Britain.

Summary

Team	Event	Group Stage				Semifinals	Final / BM	
Team	Event	Opposition Score	Opposition Score	Opposition Score	Rank	Opposition Score	Opposition Score	Rank
Argentina men's	Men's tournament	Morocco; D 0–0	Colombia; D 0–0	Japan; W 1–0	2 Q	Brazil; W 0–0 (4–3 p)	France; L 1–1 (2–3 p)	2nd place, silver medalist(s)

Team roster

Coach: Antonio Figueroa

The following is the Argentina squad in the football 5-a-side tournament of the 2024 Summer Paralympics.

No.	Pos.	Player	Class	Date of birth (age)
1	GK	Darío Lencina	Sighted	22 August 1980 (aged 44)
2	DF	Angel Deldo Garcia	B1	30 September 1987 (aged 36)
3	MF	Nahuel Heredia	B1	26 May 1995 (aged 29)
4	DF	Froilan Padilla	B1	21 February 1979 (aged 45)
5	MF	Jesus Merlos	B1	17 April 2003 (aged 21)
6	MF	Matias Olivera	B1	26 March 1997 (aged 27)
7	FW	Maximiliano Espinillo	B1	15 November 1993 (aged 30)
8	MF	Osvaldo Fernández	B1	1 September 1998 (aged 25)
9	FW	Mario Ríos	B1	9 January 1989 (aged 35)
12	GK	Germán Muleck	Sighted	3 May 1990 (aged 34)

Group stage

Pos	Team	Pld	W	D	L	GF	GA	GD	Pts	Qualification
1	Colombia	3	2	1	0	2	0	+2	7	Semi-finals
2	Argentina	3	1	2	0	1	0	+1	5	Semi-finals
3	Morocco	3	1	1	1	1	1	0	4	Fifth place match
4	Japan	3	0	0	3	0	3	−3	0	Seventh place match

Source: Paris 2024
1 September 2024
13:30

Morocco	0–0	Argentina
	Report

Eiffel Tower Stadium, Paris
Attendance: 8,900
Referee: François Carcouët (France)

2 September 2024
11:30

Argentina	0–0	Colombia
	Report

Eiffel Tower Stadium, Paris
Attendance: 8,790
Referee: Jose Alfredo Martinez Ibarra (Mexico)

3 September 2024
13:30

Argentina	1–0	Japan
Fernández 10'	Report

Eiffel Tower Stadium, Paris
Attendance: 8,890
Referee: Tom Jozef de Bruyne (Belgium)

Semi-finals

5 September 2024
20:00

Brazil	0–0	Argentina
	Report
Penalties
Maicon (penalty scored); Lopes (penalty missed); Nonato (penalty scored); da Silva (penalty missed); Soares (penalty scored); Alves (penalty missed)	3–4	(penalty scored) Espinillo; (penalty missed) Ríos; (penalty scored) Heredia; (penalty missed) Padilla; (penalty scored) Olivera; (penalty scored) Fernández

Eiffel Tower Stadium, Paris
Attendance: 11,630
Referee: François Carcouët (France)

Gold medal match

7 September 2024
20:00

France	1–1	Argentina
Villeroux 12'	Report	Espinillo 12'
Penalties
Arezki (penalty scored); Baron (penalty scored); Villeroux (penalty scored)	3–2	(penalty scored) Espinillo; (penalty scored) Ríos; (penalty missed) Heredia

Eiffel Tower Stadium, Paris
Attendance: 11,679
Referee: Tom Jozef de Bruyne (Belgium)

== Boccia ==
Argentina confirmed two quotas (one in men and one in women), by virtue of their result as the highest rank nation's in the BC3 pairs event, at the 2023 Parapan American Games in Santiago, Chile; and one individual quotas through the world ranking in men's individual BC2 events.

Athlete	Event	Pool matches				Playoffs	Quarterfinals	Semifinals	Final / BM	
Athlete	Event	Opposition Score	Opposition Score	Opposition Score	Rank	Opposition Score	Opposition Score	Opposition Score	Opposition Score	Rank
Luis Cristaldo	Men's individual BC2	Fabre (FRA); W 6–1	Silva (BRA); W 5–2	Araujo (POR); L 2–6	2 Q	Levi (ISR); W 4*–4	Mezík (SVK); L 4–5	Did not advance		6
Rodrigo Romero	Men's individual BC3	Peska (CZE); W 8–0	Iskrycki (POL); L 1–7	Tse (HKG); L 3–6	2 Q	—N/a	Michel (AUS); L 0–5	Did not advance		8
Ailén Flores	Women's individual BC1	Oliveira (BRA); L 2–5	Fujii (JPN); L 2–4	—N/a	3	—N/a	Did not advance			11
Stefanía Ferrando	Women's individual BC3	Ntenta (GRE); W 8–2	Callupe (PER); W 3–2	Ichinoe (JPN); W 6–3	1 Q	—N/a	Leeson (AUS); L 3–4	Did not advance		5
Stefanía Ferrando; Rodrigo Romero	Mixed pairs BC3	Czech Republic; W 7–3	Hong Kong; L 2–3	—N/a	2 Q	—N/a	Greece; W 5–4	South Korea; L 2–4	Thailand; W 4–2	3rd place, bronze medalist(s)

== Cycling ==
Argentina entered four para-cyclists (two in each gender) after finished the top eligible nation's at the 2022 and 2023 UCI Nation's ranking allocation ranking.

=== Road ===
Men

Athlete	Event	Time	Rank
Maximiliano Gomez	Men's road race B	DNF	
Maximiliano Gomez	Men's time trial B	40:12.22	10
Rodrigo Fernando Lopez	Men's road race C1-2-3	DNF	
Rodrigo Fernando Lopez	Men's time trial C1	25:07.69	10

Women

Athlete	Event	Time	Rank
Maria Jose Quiroga Chicahuala	Women's road race B	DNS	
Mariela Analia Delgado	Women's road race C4-5	2:09:13	13

=== Track ===
Men

Athlete	Event	Qualification		Final	
Athlete	Event	Result	Rank	Result	Rank
Maximiliano Gomez	Men's time trial B	1:05.022	9	Did not advance	
Maximiliano Gomez	Men's pursuit B	53.714	9	Did not advance	
Rodrigo Fernando Lopez	Men's time trial C1-3	1:13.813	12	Did not advance	
Rodrigo Fernando Lopez	Men's pursuit C1	42.823	6	Did not advance	

Women

Athlete	Event	Qualification		Final	
Athlete	Event	Result	Rank	Result	Rank
Maria Jose Quiroga Chicahuala	Women's time trial B	1:15.574	9	Did not advance	
Maria Jose Quiroga Chicahuala	Women's pursuit B	3:58.786	10	Did not advance	
Mariela Analia Delgado	Women's time trial C4-5	39.107	8	Did not advance	
Mariela Analia Delgado	Women's pursuit C5	4:02.298	7	Did not advance	

== Judo ==
Argentina sent one male and three female judoka to compete at the games.

Athlete	Event	Round of 16	Quarterfinals	Semifinals	Repechage	Final / BM	
Athlete	Event	Opposition Result	Opposition Result	Opposition Result	Opposition Result	Opposition Result	Rank
Eduardo Gauto	Men's 73 kg J1	Lamani (RSA); W 10–00	Pereira (BRA); L 00–10	—N/a	Camanni (ITA); L 00–10	Did not advance	
Rocío Ledesma Dure	Women's 48 kg J1	—N/a	Hangai (JPN); L 00–01	—N/a	Mueller (GER); W 11–00	Silva (BRA); L 00–10	5
Paula Gómez	Women's 57 kg J1	Buranyi (HUN); W 10–00	Mutia (USA); L 00–10	—N/a	Tlekkabyl (KAZ); W 10–00	Gagne (CAN); W 11–01	3rd place, bronze medalist(s)
Laura Candela González	Women's 57 kg J2	—N/a	Hirose (JPN); L 00–10	—N/a	Teixeira (BRA); L 00–10	Did not advance	
Nadia Boggiano Alegre	Women's 70 kg J1	Tsuchiya (JPN); W 10–00	Liu (CHN); L 00–10	—N/a	Lkhaijav (MGL); L 01–10	Did not advance	

== Paracanoeing ==
Argentina earned quota places for the following events through the 2023 ICF Canoe Sprint World Championships in Duisburg, Germany.

Athlete	Event	Heats		Semifinal		Final	
Athlete	Event	Time	Rank	Time	Rank	Time	Rank
Emilio Ariel Atamanuk	Men's VL3	51.21	5 SF	51.81	4 FB	50.91	9
Emilio Ariel Atamanuk	Men's KL2	46.40	6 SF	45.20	4 FB	44.07	9
Andrea Viviana Bracamonte	Women's KL1	1:48.12	6 SF	DSQ		Did not advance	

== Powerlifting ==
Athlete	Event	Attempts (kg)				Result (kg)	Rank
Athlete	Event	1	2	3	PL	Result (kg)	Rank
Lourdes Maciel	Women's 45 kg	81	83	~~86~~	—	83	9

== Rowing ==
Athlete	Event	Heats		Repechage		Final	
Athlete	Event	Time	Rank	Time	Rank	Time	Rank
Brenda Sardon	PR1 women's single sculls	11:48.23	6 R	11:46.07	5 FB	12:11.84	10

Qualification Legend: FA=Final A (medal); FB=Final B (non-medal); R=Repechage

== Shooting ==
For the first time since the nations last participation at the 2012 games in London, Argentina entered one para-shooter's after achieved quota places for the following events by virtue of their best finishes at the 2022, 2023 and 2024 world cup, 2022 World Championships, 2023 World Championships and 2023 Parapan American Games, as long as they obtained a minimum qualifying score (MQS) by May 31, 2024.

Athlete	Event	Qualification		Final	
Athlete	Event	Points	Rank	Points	Rank
María Laura Rodríguez Belvedere	R4 Mixed 10 metre air rifle standing SH2	622.5	25	Did not advance	
María Laura Rodríguez Belvedere	R5 Mixed 10 metre air rifle prone SH2	631.6	24	Did not advance	

== Swimming ==
Argentina secured one quotas at the 2023 World Para Swimming Championships after finishing in the top two places in Paralympic class disciplines.

Men

Athlete	Event	Heats		Final	
Athlete	Event	Result	Rank	Result	Rank
Inaki Basiloff	Men's 400 m freestyle S7	5:17.33	7 Q	4:40.27	3rd place, bronze medalist(s)
Inaki Basiloff	Men's 100 m backstroke S7	1:15.86	8 Q	1:15.87	8
Inaki Basiloff	Men's 50 m butterfly S7	30.88	7 Q	30.80	7
Inaki Basiloff	Men's 200 m individual medley SM7	2:37.99	3 Q	2:29.81	1st place, gold medalist(s)
Matias de Andrade	Men's 100 m backstroke S6	1:16.16	1 Q	1:16.30	4
Pipo Carlomagno	Men's 100 m backstroke S8	1:11.03	10	Did not advance	
Santiago Gabriel Senestro	Men's 100 m backstroke S10	1:06.65	11	Did not advance	
Santiago Gabriel Senestro	Men's 100 m breaststroke SB9	1:12.82	12	Did not advance	
Santiago Gabriel Senestro	Men's 200 m individual medley SM10	2:22.79	14	Did not advance	
Lautaro Daniel Maidana Cancinos	Men's 100 m backstroke S14	1:04.13	16	Did not advance	
Lautaro Daniel Maidana Cancinos	Men's 100 m butterfly S14	59.47	10	Did not advance	
Nicolas Rivero	Men's 100 m breaststroke SB4	1:44.72	4 Q	1:44.77	4
German Leonel Arevalo	Men's 100 m breaststroke SB5	1:38.30	7 Q	1:39.66	7

Women

Athlete	Event	Heats		Final	
Athlete	Event	Result	Rank	Result	Rank
Nadia Baez	Women's 50 m freestyle S11	33.91	13	Did not advance	
Nadia Baez	Women's 100 m breaststroke SB11	1:26.98	5 Q	1:28.97	5
Analuz Pellitero	Women's 50 m freestyle S11	35.03	15	Did not advance	
Analuz Pellitero	Women's 100 m freestyle S11	1:13.50	10	Did not advance	
Analuz Pellitero	Women's 100 m backstroke S11	1:19.62	5 Q	1:18.09	5
Elizabeth Noriega	Women's 100 m freestyle S5	1:31.93	9	Did not advance	
Elizabeth Noriega	Women's 200 m freestyle S5	3:21.72	14	Did not advance	
Elizabeth Noriega	Women's 50 m backstroke S5	49.77	12	Did not advance	
Daniela Gimenez	Women's 100 m breaststroke SB9	1:21.72	8 Q	1:22.41	8
Maria Jazmin Aragon Diani	Women's 100 m butterfly S8	1:29.82	12	Did not advance	

== Table tennis ==
Argentina secure two single spot for the Paralympic games. Elías Romero qualified for the games following the triumph of his gold medal results in the men's class 5 through the 2023 Parapan American Games in Santiago, Chile; meanwhile Gabriel Copola qualified for the games through the allocations of ITTF final world ranking.

Athlete	Event	Round of 16	Quarterfinals	Semifinals	Final / BM	
Athlete	Event	Opposition Result	Opposition Result	Opposition Result	Opposition Result	Rank
Gabriel Copola	Men's individual C3	Glinbancheun (THA); L 0–3	Did not advance			=9
Elías Romero	Men's individual C5	Savant-Aira (FRA); L 0–3	Did not advance			=9
María Constanza Garrone	Women's individual C1-2	Tapola (FIN); W 3–0	Rossi (ITA); L 0–3	Did not advance		=5
Elías Romero; Gabriel Copola	Men's doubles MD8	Ozturk / Turan (TUR); L 1–3	Did not advance			=9
Elías Romero; María Constanza Garrone	Mixed doubles XD7	Kim J-g / Yoon J-y (KOR); L 0–3	Did not advance			=9

== Taekwondo ==
Argentina entered two athletes to compete at the Paralympics competition. Miguel Issac Galeano and Juan Samorano qualified for the games in men's under 58 kg and 70 kg events, after winning the gold medal in his class, through the 2024 Pan American Qualification Tournament in Santo Domingo, Dominican Republic.

Athlete	Event	Round of 16	Quarterfinals	Repechage	Semifinals	Final / BM	
Athlete	Event	Opposition Result	Opposition Result	Opposition Result	Opposition Result	Opposition Result	Rank
Miguel Issac Galeano	Men's −58 kg	Kaenkham (THA); L 10–12	Did not advance				=9
Juan Samorano	Men's −70 kg	Sotthiset (THA); W 14–10	Kudo (JPN); L 2–4	Nikoladze (GEO); W 15–3	—N/a	Alikulov (UZB); W 6–5	3rd place, bronze medalist(s)

== Wheelchair fencing ==
Athlete	Event	Round of 32	Round of 16	Repechage 1	Quarterfinals	Repechage 2	Repechage 3	Semifinals	Repechage 4	Final / BM	
Athlete	Event	Opposition	Opposition Score	Opposition Score	Opposition Score	Opposition Score	Opposition Score	Opposition Score	Opposition Score	Opposition Score	Rank
Hugo Alderete	Men's épée B	Castro (RPT); L DNS	Did not advance								
Hugo Alderete	Men's foil B	—N/a	Massa (ITA); L 2-15	Chavez (BRA); L10-15	Did not advance						
Hugo Alderete	Men's sabre B	—N/a	Tarjanyi (HUN); L 8–15	Hanssen (USA); L 5–15	Did not advance						

== Wheelchair tennis ==
Argentina entered one player into the Paralympics by virtue of the gold medal results at the 2023 Parapan American Games in Santiago, Chile.

Athlete	Event	Round of 64	Round of 32	Round of 16	Quarterfinals	Semifinals	Final / BM	
Athlete	Event	Opposition Result	Opposition Result	Opposition Result	Opposition Result	Opposition Result	Opposition Result	Rank
Gustavo Fernández	Men's singles	Bye	Cattanéo (FRA); W 6–1, 6–4	Cataldo (CHI); W 6–0, 6–1	Reid (GBR); W 6–0, 7–6 (7-5)	Oda (JPN); L 2–6, 5–7	de la Puente (ESP); W 6–1, 6–2	3rd place, bronze medalist(s)
Ezequiel Casco	Men's singles	Parker (AUS); W (7–5, 6–4)	de la Puente (ESP); L (2–6, 0–6)	Did not advance				=17
Maria Florencia Moreno	Women's singles	—N/a	Takamuro (JPN); L (1–6, 0–6)	Did not advance				=17
Gustavo Fernández; Ezequiel Casco	Men's doubles	—N/a	Ratzlaff / Stroud (USA); W (6–3, 6–4)	Spaargaren / ter Hofte (NED); L (5–7, 3–6)	Did not advance			=9

== See also ==
- Argentina at the 2023 Parapan American Games
- Argentina at the 2024 Summer Olympics
- Argentina at the Paralympics
