= South Africa at the 2024 Summer Paralympics =

- Flag of South Africa
- IPC code: RSA
- NPC: South African Sports Confederation and Olympic Committee
- Website: www.sascoc.co.za

in Paris, France 28 August 2024 – 8 September 2024
- Competitors: 32 in 9 sports
- Flag bearers: Mpumelelo Mhlongo; Kat Swanepoel
- Medals Ranked 46th: Gold 2 Silver 0 Bronze 4 Total 6

Summer Paralympics appearances (overview)
- 1964; 1968; 1972; 1976; 1980–1988; 1992; 1996; 2000; 2004; 2008; 2012; 2016; 2020; 2024

South Africa competed at the 2024 Summer Paralympics in Paris, France, from 28 August to 8 September 2024.

== Medalists ==
Medal	Name	Sport	Event	Date
Gold	Mpumelelo Mhlongo	Athletics	Men's 100 metres T44	1 September
Gold	Simone Kruger	Athletics	Women's discus throw F38	6 September
Bronze	Louzanne Coetzee; Guide: Erasmus Badenhorst	Athletics	Women's 1500 metres T11	2 September
Bronze	Nicolas Pieter du Preez	Cycling	Men's road time trial H1	4 September
Bronze	Donald Ramphadi; Lucas Sithole	Wheelchair tennis	Quad doubles	4 September
Bronze	Mpumelelo Mhlongo	Athletics	Men's 200 metres T64	7 September

== Competitors ==
The following is the list of number of competitors in the Games.

Sport	Men	Women	Total
Archery	1	0	1
Athletics	10	5	15
Boccia	1	1	2
Cycling	1	0	1
Equestrian	0	1	1
Judo	1	0	1
Paratriathlon	0	1	1
Swimming	2	3	5
Wheelchair tennis	3	2	5
Total	19	13	32

== Archery ==
South Africa secured a quota place in the men's W1, event by virtue of their result at the 2024 Africa–Oceania Qualification Tournament in Dubai, United Arab Emirates.

Athlete	Event	Ranking Round		Round of 32	Round of 16	Quarterfinals	Semifinals	Finals	
Athlete	Event	Score	Seed	Opposition Score	Opposition Score	Opposition Score	Opposition Score	Opposition Score	Rank
Shaun Anderson	Men's individual W1	638	9	—N/a	Aydın (TUR); W 133–132	Zhang (CHN); L 134–136	Did not advance		

== Athletics ==
South African track and field athletes achieved quota places for the following events based on their results at the 2023 World Championships, 2024 World Championships, or through high performance allocation, as long as they meet the minimum entry standard (MES).

Key

- Note–Ranks given for track events are within the athlete's heat only
- Q = Qualified for the next round
- q = Qualified for the next round as a fastest loser or, in field events, by position without achieving the qualifying target
- DQ = Disqualified
- PR = Paralympic Record
- AR = Area (or continental) Record
- NR = National Record
- SB = Season's Best
- N/A = Round not applicable for the event
- Bye = Athlete not required to compete in round

Track & road events
Men

Athlete	Event	Heat		Final	
Athlete	Event	Result	Rank	Result	Rank
Jaco Smit	Men's 100 metres T12	11.12	2	Did not advance	
Michael Puseletso Mabote	Men's 100 metres T63	12.05	1 Q	12.16	5
Mpumelelo Mhlongo	Men's 100 metres T44	—N/a		11.12	1st place, gold medalist(s)
Mpumelelo Mhlongo	Men's 200 metres T64	22.92	1 Q	22.62	3rd place, bronze medalist(s)
Collen Mahlalela	Men's 400 metres T47	48.65	2 Q	49.95	7
Paul Daniels	Men's 100 metres T64	11.23	4	Did not advance	
Paul Daniels	Men's 400 metres T62	—N/a		50.63	6
Daniel du Plessis	Men's 100 metres T64	11.75	7	Did not advance	
Daniel du Plessis	Men's 400 metres T62	—N/a		52.91	8

Women

Athlete	Event	Heat		Final	
Athlete	Event	Result	Rank	Result	Rank
Sheryl James	Women's 100 metres T37	13.69	3 Q	13.90	8
Sheryl James	Women's 200 metres T37	—N/a		29.08	7
Sheryl James	Women's 400 metres T37	—N/a		1:06.88	4
Liezel Gouws	Women's 400 metres T37	—N/a		1:08.33	5
Louzanne Coetzee	Women's 1500 metres T11	4:45.25	2 q	4:35.49	3rd place, bronze medalist(s)
Louzanne Coetzee	Women's marathon T11	—N/a		3:25:53	7
Tezna Kirstin Abrahams	Women's 200 metres T64	31.17	5	Did not advance	

Field events

Athlete	Event	Final	
Athlete	Event	Distance	Position
Michael Puseletso Mabote	Men's long jump T63	6.44	6
Mpumelelo Mhlongo	Men's long jump T64	7.12	5
Khumo Neo Pitso	Men's high jump T47	1.98	5
Hermanus Blom	Men's shot put F12	13.16	7
Kerwin Noemdo	Men's shot put F46	15.63	5
Yane Van der Merwe	Women's discus throw F64	NM	
Liezel Gouws	Women's long jump T37	3.62	8
Tezna Kirstin Abrahams	Women's long jump T64	4.46	11
Simone Kruger	Women's discus throw F38	38.70	1st place, gold medalist(s)

== Boccia ==
South Africa confirmed two quotas (one man and one woman), by virtue of their result as the highest rank nation's in the BC3 pairs event, at the 2023 Africa Regional Championship in Cairo.

Athlete	Event	Pool matches					Quarterfinals	Semifinals	Final / BM	
Athlete	Event	Opposition Score	Opposition Score	Opposition Score	Opposition Score	Rank	Opposition Score	Opposition Score	Opposition Score	Rank
Karabo Morapedi	Men's individual BC3	Michel (AUS) L 2–10	Arnott (GBR) L 1–7	Wilson (GBR) L 0–9	—N/a	4	Did not advance			
Elanza Jordaan	Women's individual BC3	Ho (HKG) L 0–8	Costa (POR) L 2–4	Calado (BRA) L 0–5	—N/a	4	Did not advance			
Karabo Morapedi; Elanza Jordaan	Mixed pairs BC3	Brazil L 0–7	Greece L 0–10	—N/a		3	Did not advance			

== Cycling ==
South Africa entered one male para-cyclist after finished the top eligible nation's at the 2022 UCI Nation's ranking allocation ranking.

Road Events — Men

Athlete	Event	Time	Rank
Nicholas Pieter du Preez	Men's road race H1-2	DNF	
Nicholas Pieter du Preez	Men's road time trial H1	36:07.05	3rd place, bronze medalist(s)

== Equestrian ==
South Africa entered one para-equestrian into the Paralympic equestrian competition, by virtue of the nations individual final world para dressage rankings.

Individual

Athlete	Horse	Event	Total	
Athlete	Horse	Event	Score	Rank
Philippa Johnson	Just In Time	Individual championship test grade IV	63.889	14
Philippa Johnson	Just In Time	Individual freestyle test grade IV	Did not advance	

== Judo ==
Athlete	Event	Round of 16	Quarterfinals	Semifinals	Repechage	Repechage Final	Final / BM	
Athlete	Event	Opposition Result	Opposition Result	Opposition Result	Opposition Result	Opposition Result	Opposition Result	Rank
Ndyebo Lamani	Men's 73 kg J1	Gauto (ARG); L 0–10	Did not advance					

== Paratriathlon ==
Athlete	Class	Swim	T1	Bike	T2	Run	Time	Rank
Kirsty Weir	Women's PTS4	19:49	1:18	38:49	0:41	20:37	1:21:14	8

== Swimming ==
South Africa entered five swimmers (two men and three women), through the results at the 2023 World Para Swimming Championships after finishing in the top two places in Paralympic class disciplines; and by achieving the Minimum Qualification Standard (MQS) allocation slots.

Men

Athlete	Events	Heats		Final	
Athlete	Events	Time	Rank	Time	Rank
Christian Sadie	50 m freestyle S7	29.27	7 Q	28.75	7
Christian Sadie	100 m backstroke S7	1:14.82	6 Q	1:13.03	5
Christian Sadie	50 m butterfly S7	30.23	3 Q	29.94	5
Christian Sadie	200 m individual medley SM7	2:35.98	2 Q	2:35.02	5
Nathan Hendricks	400 m freestyle S13	4:17.07	5 Q	4:18.05	6
Nathan Hendricks	100 m backstroke S13	1:03.53	8 Q	1:03.43	7
Nathan Hendricks	100 m breaststroke SB13	1:13.04	14	Did not advance	
Nathan Hendricks	100 m butterfly S13	59.51	6 Q	59.91	8
Nathan Hendricks	200 m individual medley SM13	2:18.36	8 Q	2:17.15	7

Women

Athlete	Events	Heats		Final	
Athlete	Events	Time	Rank	Time	Rank
Kat Swanepoel	50 m backstroke S4	49.63	11	Did not advance	
Alani Ferreira	100 m freestyle S12	1:09.69	12	Did not advance	
Alani Ferreira	400 m freestyle S13	4:58.06	8 Q	4:55.95	8
Alani Ferreira	100 m breaststroke SB12	1:21.95	4 Q	1:21.36	5
Danika Vyncke	400 m freestyle S13	5:10.91	10	Did not advance	
Danika Vyncke	100 m breaststroke SB13	1:24.91	8 Q	1:23.82	8

== Wheelchair tennis ==
South Africa entered five players into the Paralympics by virtue of the gold medal results at the 2023 African Para Games in Accra, Ghana.

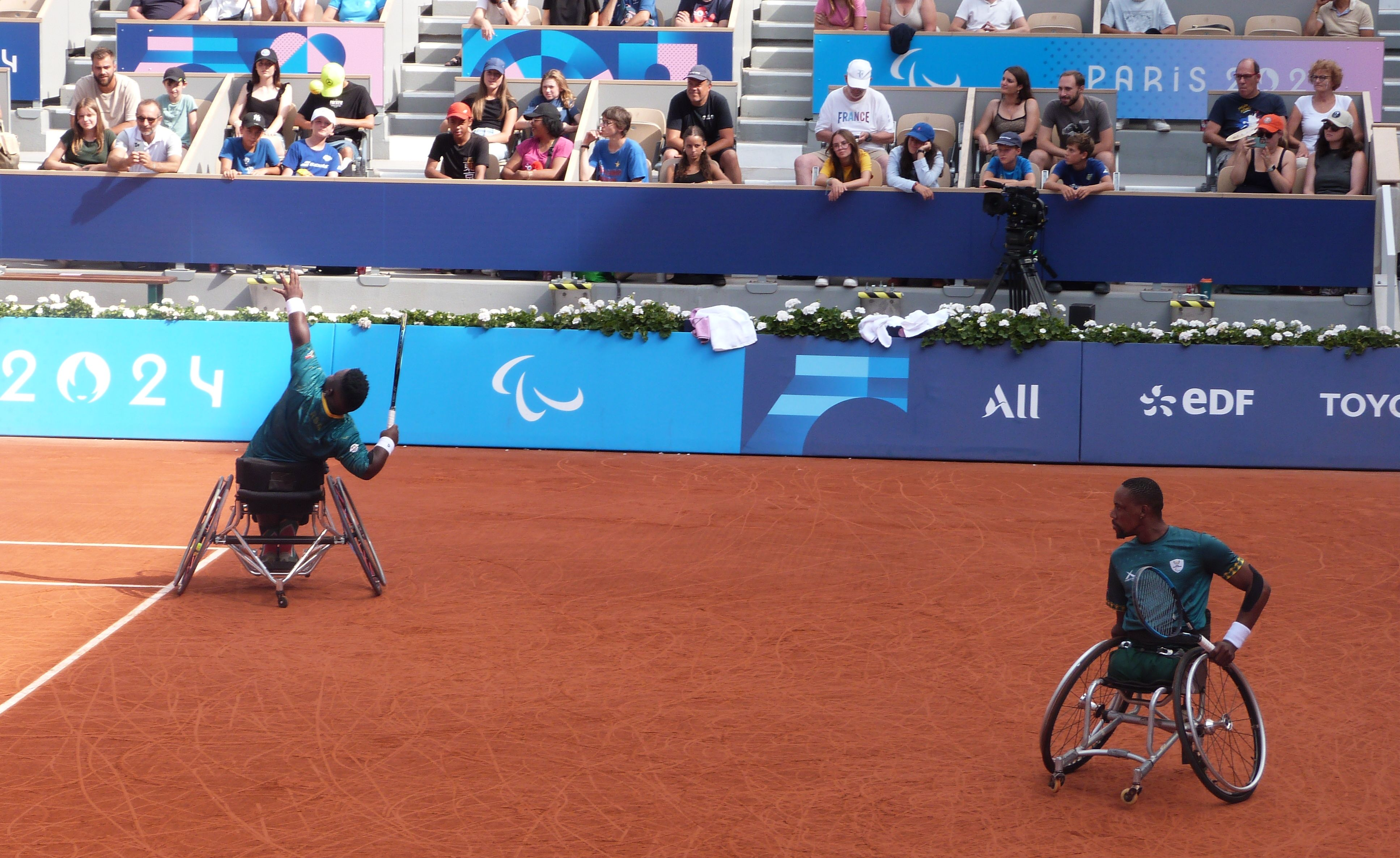
Quad doubles semi-final Schroder / Vink (Netherlands) vs Ramphadi / Sithole (South Africa)

Athlete	Event	Round of 64	Round of 32	Round of 16	Quarterfinals	Semifinals	Final / BM	
Athlete	Event	Opposition Result	Opposition Result	Opposition Result	Opposition Result	Opposition Result	Opposition Result	Rank
Alwande Sikhosana	Men's singles	Carneiro (BRA); W 6–4, 7–5	Arai (JPN); L 1–6, 0–6	Did not advance				
Kgothatso Montjane	Women's singles	—N/a	Guo (CHN); L W/O	Did not advance				
Mariska Venter	Women's singles	—N/a	Kamiji (JPN); L 2–6, 1–6	Did not advance				
Kgothatso Montjane; Mariska Venter	Women's doubles	—N/a		Fairbank / Mörch (FRA); W 4–6, 6–1, 10–4	Li /Zhu (CHN); L W/O	Did not advance		
Donald Ramphadi	Quads singles	—N/a		Pena (BRA); L 6–2, 5–7, 1–6	Did not advance			
Lucas Sithole	Quads singles	—N/a		Vink (NED); L 0–6, 2–6	Did not advance			
Donald Ramphadi; Lucas Sithole	Quads doubles	—N/a			Cayulef / Pérez (CHI); W 4–6, 7–6^{(1)}, [6–10]	Schröder/ Vink (NED); L 1–6, 1–6	Pena/ Silva (BRA); W 6–2, 4–6, 10–8	3rd place, bronze medalist(s)

== See also ==
- South Africa at the 2024 Summer Olympics
- South Africa at the Paralympics
