= Wheelchair tennis at the 2024 Summer Paralympics – Quad singles =

Wheelchair tennis – Quad singles at the XVII Paralympic Games
- Paralympic wheelchair tennis
- Venue: Stade Roland Garros
- Date: 31 August – 5 September 2024
- Competitors: 15 from 9 nations

Medalists
1st place, gold medalist(s)		Niels Vink	Netherlands
2nd place, silver medalist(s)		Sam Schröder	Netherlands
3rd place, bronze medalist(s)		Guy Sasson	Israel

Quad singles
- Wheelchair tennis at the 2024 Summer Paralympics

Events
Singles	men	women	quad
Doubles	men	women	quad
← 2020 ·	Summer Paralympics	· 2028 →

The quad singles wheelchair tennis tournament at the 2024 Paralympic Games in France was held at the Stade Roland Garros in Paris from 31 August to 5 September 2024.

Australia's Dylan Alcott was the defending gold medalist. Niels Vink won gold for the Netherlands after beating Sam Schroder in the final.

== Seeds ==
1. Sam Schröder (NED) (final)
2. Niels Vink (NED) (champion)
3. Guy Sasson (ISR) (semifinals)
4. Andy Lapthorne (GBR) (quarterfinals)

== Draw ==
=== Key ===
- Q = Qualifier
- WC = Wild card
- LL = Lucky loser
- Alt = Alternate
- SE = Special exempt
- PR = Protected ranking
- ITF = ITF entry
- JE = Junior exempt
- w/o = Walkover
- r = Retired
- d = Defaulted
- SR = Special ranking
- BPC = Bipartite Invitation

First round
Leandro Pena (BRA)	2	7	6
Donald Ramphadi (RSA)	6	5	1
3	Guy Sasson (ISR)	6	6
Francisco Cayulef (CHI)	2	3
Uğur Altınel (TUR)	7^{8}	6^{1}	1
Gregory Slade (GBR)	6^{6}	7^{7}	6
David Wagner (USA)	1	2
Ahmet Kaplan (TUR)	6	6
Diego Pérez (CHI)	4	3
4	Andy Lapthorne (GBR)	6	6
Ymanitu Silva (BRA)	2	1
Robert Shaw (CAN)	6	6
Lucas Sithole (RSA)	0	2
2	Niels Vink (NED)	6	6

Quarterfinals
1	Sam Schröder (NED)	6	6
Leandro Pena (BRA)	1	1
3	Guy Sasson (ISR)	6	6
Gregory Slade (GBR)	1	2
Ahmet Kaplan (TUR)	6	3	6
4	Andy Lapthorne (GBR)	4	6	3
Robert Shaw (CAN)	0	0
2	Niels Vink (NED)	6	6

Semifinals
1	Sam Schröder (NED)	7^{7}	6
3	Guy Sasson (ISR)	6^{1}	4
Ahmet Kaplan (TUR)	1	1
2	Niels Vink (NED)	6	6

Gold medal match
1	Sam Schröder (NED)	0	1
2	Niels Vink (NED)	6	6
Bronze medal match
3	Guy Sasson (ISR)	5	6	6
Ahmet Kaplan (TUR)	7	4	1
