= 2025 US Open (tennis) =

- Date: August 24 (Note: Mixed doubles competition began on August 19.) – September 7
- Edition: 145th
- Category: Grand Slam (ITF)
- Draw: 128S/64D
- Prize money: $90,000,000
- Surface: Hard
- Location: New York City, United States
- Venue: USTA Billie Jean King National Tennis Center

Champions

Men's singles
- (Spain) Carlos Alcaraz

Women's singles
- Aryna Sabalenka

Men's doubles
- (Spain) Marcel Granollers / (Argentina) Horacio Zeballos

Women's doubles
- (Canada) Gabriela Dabrowski / (New Zealand) Erin Routliffe

Mixed doubles
- (Italy) Sara Errani / (Italy) Andrea Vavassori

Wheelchair men's singles
- (Japan) Tokito Oda

Wheelchair women's singles
- (Japan) Yui Kamiji

Wheelchair quad singles
- (Netherlands) Niels Vink

Wheelchair men's doubles
- (Argentina) Gustavo Fernández / (Japan) Tokito Oda

Wheelchair women's doubles
- (China) Li Xiaohui / (China) Wang Ziying

Wheelchair quad doubles
- (Israel) Guy Sasson / (Netherlands) Niels Vink

Boys' singles
- (Bulgaria) Ivan Ivanov

Girls' singles
- (Belgium) Jeline Vandromme

Boys' doubles
- (United States) Keaton Hance / (United States) Jack Kennedy

Girls' doubles
- (Czech Republic) Alena Kovačková / (Czech Republic) Jana Kovačková

Wheelchair boys' singles
- (Austria) Maximilian Taucher

Wheelchair girls' singles
- (United States) Sabina Czauz

Wheelchair boys' doubles
- (United Kingdom) Ruben Harris / (Austria) Maximilian Taucher

Wheelchair girls' doubles
- (United States) Sabina Czauz / (Japan) Seira Matsuoka
- US Open

The 2025 US Open was the 145th edition of tennis' US Open, and the fourth and final Grand Slam event of the year. It was held on the outdoor hard courts at the USTA Billie Jean King National Tennis Center in New York City. Jannik Sinner and Aryna Sabalenka were the men's and women's singles defending champions, respectively. While Sabalenka successfully defended her title, Sinner lost in the final to Carlos Alcaraz. This was the final edition of the tournament with Stacey Allaster as its director.

== Tournament ==
The tournament is run by the International Tennis Federation (ITF), and is a part of the 2025 ATP Tour and the 2025 WTA Tour calendars under the Grand Slam category. The tournament is played on hard courts and takes place over a series of 17 courts with Laykold surface, including the three existing main showcourts – Arthur Ashe Stadium, Louis Armstrong Stadium and Grandstand.

The US Open main draw expanded to 15 competition days in 2025, and featured the first weekend start to the main draw in the Open Era alongside the Australian Open and the French Open tennis championships, with competitions beginning on Tuesday, August 19, and continuing until Sunday, September 7.

The wheelchair events were held for the first time since 2023, as they were not held in 2024 due to scheduling conflicts with the Paris 2024 Paralympic Games.

=== New mixed doubles format ===
The 2025 edition of the US Open was the first with a new format of mixed doubles competition, that was moved to the first week of the US Open–Fan Week and played from Tuesday, August 19 to Wednesday, August 20 with a reward of $1 million winner's prize.

The two days of competition were held in the Arthur Ashe Stadium and the Louis Armstrong Stadium, featuring 16 teams, with eight teams earning direct entry based on their combined singles ranking and eight wild-card entries. The matches were played in best-of-three-sets with short sets to four games, no-ad scoring, tiebreakers at four-all, and a 10-point match tiebreak in lieu of a third set. The final was a best-of-three set match to six games, featuring no-ad scoring, with tiebreakers at six-all with a 10-point match tiebreaker in lieu of a third set.

The changes generated significantly more attention for mixed doubles than in past years, with large crowds attending both days of play in Arthur Ashe and Louis Armstrong Stadiums. Many fans and players praised the new approach for raising the profile of the discipline and creating a lively atmosphere, while others criticized it for limiting opportunities for doubles specialists and moving away from established traditions. Despite the mixed reception, the event was generally regarded as a success, and it is expected that the format will return in future editions.

Defending champions and doubles specialists Sara Errani and Andrea Vavassori retained the title, defeating Iga Świątek and Casper Ruud in the final.

=== Special events ===
Before the official start of the final Grand Slam tournament of the year, past tennis players Maria Sharapova and the Bryan Brothers were inducted into the International Tennis Hall of Fame on Saturday, August 23. The Hall's honorary president, former Belgian tennis player Kim Clijsters, presented them with the rings in front of the audience.

== Events ==
=== Men's singles ===
- (Spain) Carlos Alcaraz def. (Italy) Jannik Sinner, 6–2, 3–6, 6–1, 6–4

=== Women's singles ===
- Aryna Sabalenka def. (United States) Amanda Anisimova, 6–3, 7–6^{(7–3)}

=== Men's doubles ===
- (Spain) Marcel Granollers / (Argentina) Horacio Zeballos def. (United Kingdom) Joe Salisbury / (United Kingdom) Neal Skupski, 3–6, 7–6^{(7–4)}, 7–5

=== Women's doubles ===
- (Canada) Gabriela Dabrowski / (New Zealand) Erin Routliffe def. (Czech Republic) Kateřina Siniaková / (United States) Taylor Townsend, 6–4, 6–4

=== Mixed doubles ===
- (Italy) Sara Errani / (Italy) Andrea Vavassori def. (Poland) Iga Świątek / (Norway) Casper Ruud, 6–3, 5–7, [10–6]

=== Wheelchair men's singles ===
- (Japan) Tokito Oda def. (Argentina) Gustavo Fernández, 6–2, 3–6, 7–6^{(13–11)}

=== Wheelchair women's singles ===
- (Japan) Yui Kamiji def. (China) Li Xiaohui, 0–6, 6–1, 6–3

=== Wheelchair quad singles ===
- (Netherlands) Niels Vink def. (Netherlands) Sam Schröder, 7–5, 6–3

=== Wheelchair men's doubles ===
- (Argentina) Gustavo Fernández / (Japan) Tokito Oda def. (United Kingdom) Alfie Hewett / (United Kingdom) Gordon Reid, 6–1, 2–6, [10–6]

=== Wheelchair women's doubles ===
- (China) Li Xiaohui / (China) Wang Ziying def. (Netherlands) Diede de Groot / (China) Zhu Zhenzhen, 6–4, 7–6^{(7–4)}

=== Wheelchair quad doubles ===
- (Israel) Guy Sasson / (Netherlands) Niels Vink def. (Chile) Francisco Cayulef / (Argentina) Gonzalo Enrique Lazarte, 6–1, 6–1

=== Boys' singles ===
- (Bulgaria) Ivan Ivanov def. (Bulgaria) Alexander Vasilev, 7–5, 6–3

=== Girls' singles ===
- (Belgium) Jeline Vandromme def. (Sweden) Lea Nilsson, 7–6^{(7–2)}, 6–2

=== Boys' doubles ===
- (United States) Keaton Hance / (United States) Jack Kennedy def. (United States) Noah Johnston / (United States) Benjamin Willwerth, 6–3, 1–6, [10–8]

=== Girls' doubles ===
- (Czech Republic) Alena Kovačková / (Czech Republic) Jana Kovačková def. (Belgium) Jeline Vandromme / (Lithuania) Laima Vladson, 6–2, 6–2

=== Wheelchair boys' singles ===
- (Austria) Maximilian Taucher def. (Belgium) Alexander Lantermann, 6–4, 6–1

=== Wheelchair girls' singles ===
- (United States) Sabina Czauz def. (Belgium) Luna Gryp, 7–5, 6–2

=== Wheelchair boys' doubles ===
- (United Kingdom) Ruben Harris / (Austria) Maximilian Taucher def. (Brazil) Luiz Calixto / (United States) Tomas Majetic, 6–3, 6–3

=== Wheelchair girls' doubles ===
- (United States) Sabina Czauz / (Japan) Seira Matsuoka def. (United States) Lucy Heald / (Germany) Ela Porges, 6–0, 6–1
- Sources

== Singles players ==
Source for complete singles draws

Men's singles
Champion		Runner-up	
(Spain) Carlos Alcaraz [2]		(Italy) Jannik Sinner [1]	
Semifinals out
(Canada) Félix Auger-Aliassime [25]		(Serbia) Novak Djokovic [7]	
Quarterfinals out
(Italy) Lorenzo Musetti [10]	(Australia) Alex de Minaur [8]	(United States) Taylor Fritz [4]	(Czech Republic) Jiří Lehečka [20]
4th round out
(Kazakhstan) Alexander Bublik [23]	(Spain) Jaume Munar	Andrey Rublev [15]	(Switzerland) Leandro Riedi (Q)
(Germany) Jan-Lennard Struff (Q)	(Czech Republic) Tomáš Macháč [21]	(France) Adrian Mannarino	(France) Arthur Rinderknech
3rd round out
(Canada) Denis Shapovalov [27]	(United States) Tommy Paul [14]	(Italy) Flavio Cobolli [24]	(Belgium) Zizou Bergs
(Germany) Alexander Zverev [3]	(Hong Kong) Coleman Wong (Q)	(Poland) Kamil Majchrzak	(Germany) Daniel Altmaier
(United Kingdom) Cameron Norrie	(United States) Frances Tiafoe [17]	(France) Ugo Blanchet (Q)	(Switzerland) Jérôme Kym (Q)
(United States) Ben Shelton [6]	(Belgium) Raphaël Collignon	(France) Benjamin Bonzi	(Italy) Luciano Darderi [32]
2nd round out
(Australia) Alexei Popyrin	(France) Valentin Royer (WC)	(Australia) Tristan Schoolkate (WC)	(Portugal) Nuno Borges
(Belgium) David Goffin	(United States) Jenson Brooksby	(Canada) Gabriel Diallo [31]	(United Kingdom) Jack Draper [5]
(United Kingdom) Jacob Fearnley	Roman Safiullin	(Australia) Adam Walton	(United States) Tristan Boyer (WC)
Karen Khachanov [9]	(Argentina) Francisco Cerúndolo [19]	(Greece) Stefanos Tsitsipas [26]	(Japan) Shintaro Mochizuki (Q)
(United States) Zachary Svajda (Q)	(Argentina) Francisco Comesaña	(United States) Martin Damm (Q)	(Denmark) Holger Rune [11]
(Czech Republic) Jakub Menšík [16]	(Brazil) João Fonseca	(United States) Brandon Nakashima [30]	(South Africa) Lloyd Harris (Q)
(Spain) Pablo Carreño Busta	(Australia) Jordan Thompson	(Argentina) Tomás Martín Etcheverry	(Norway) Casper Ruud [12]
(United States) Marcos Giron	(Spain) Alejandro Davidovich Fokina [18]	(United States) Eliot Spizzirri (WC)	(Italy) Mattia Bellucci
1st round out
(Czech Republic) Vít Kopřiva	(Finland) Emil Ruusuvuori (PR)	(China) Bu Yunchaokete	(Hungary) Márton Fucsovics
(Croatia) Marin Čilić	(Italy) Lorenzo Sonego	(United States) Brandon Holt	(Denmark) Elmer Møller
(France) Giovanni Mpetshi Perricard	(France) Quentin Halys	(Australia) Aleksandar Vukic	(Italy) Francesco Passaro (Q)
(Bosnia and Herzegovina) Damir Džumhur	(Portugal) Jaime Faria (LL)	(Chinese Taipei) Tseng Chun-hsin	(Argentina) Federico Agustín Gómez (Q)
(Chile) Alejandro Tabilo	(Spain) Roberto Bautista Agut	(France) Gaël Monfils	(United Kingdom) Billy Harris (LL)
(France) Ugo Humbert [22]	(United States) Aleksandar Kovacevic	(Australia) James Duckworth (LL)	(Croatia) Dino Prižmić (Q)
(United States) Nishesh Basavareddy (WC)	(Bolivia) Hugo Dellien	(Spain) Pedro Martínez	(Italy) Matteo Arnaldi
(France) Alexandre Müller	(Serbia) Hamad Medjedovic	(France) Hugo Gaston	(Australia) Christopher O'Connell
(United States) Learner Tien	(Hungary) Zsombor Piros (Q)	(United States) Sebastian Korda	(United States) Alex Michelsen [28]
(Japan) Yoshihito Nishioka	(United States) Darwin Blanch (WC)	(United States) Mackenzie McDonald	(Netherlands) Botic van de Zandschulp
(Chile) Nicolás Jarry	(Hungary) Fábián Marozsán	(Serbia) Miomir Kecmanović	(Italy) Luca Nardi
(Netherlands) Jesper de Jong (Q)	(United States) Ethan Quinn	(Argentina) Sebastián Báez	(United States) Emilio Nava (WC)
(Peru) Ignacio Buse (Q)	(Spain) Pablo Llamas Ruiz (Q)	(France) Corentin Moutet	(Netherlands) Tallon Griekspoor [29]
(Croatia) Borna Ćorić	(Argentina) Camilo Ugo Carabelli	(Colombia) Daniel Elahi Galán (LL)	(Austria) Sebastian Ofner (PR)
Daniil Medvedev [13]	(Argentina) Mariano Navone	(Spain) Roberto Carballés Baena	(Kazakhstan) Alexander Shevchenko
(Australia) Rinky Hijikata	(United States) Stefan Dostanic (WC)	(China) Shang Juncheng	(United States) Reilly Opelka

Women's singles
Champion		Runner-up	
Aryna Sabalenka [1]		(United States) Amanda Anisimova [8]	
Semifinals out
(United States) Jessica Pegula [4]		(Japan) Naomi Osaka [23]	
Quarterfinals out
(Czech Republic) Markéta Vondroušová	(Czech Republic) Barbora Krejčíková	(Czech Republic) Karolína Muchová [11]	(Poland) Iga Świątek [2]
4th round out
(Spain) Cristina Bucșa	(Kazakhstan) Elena Rybakina [9]	(United States) Ann Li	(United States) Taylor Townsend
(Ukraine) Marta Kostyuk [27]	(United States) Coco Gauff [3]	(Brazil) Beatriz Haddad Maia [18]	Ekaterina Alexandrova [13]
3rd round out
(Canada) Leylah Fernandez [31]	(Belgium) Elise Mertens [19]	(United Kingdom) Emma Raducanu	(Italy) Jasmine Paolini [7]
Victoria Azarenka	(Australia) Priscilla Hon (Q)	(United States) Emma Navarro [10]	Mirra Andreeva [5]
(France) Diane Parry	(Czech Republic) Linda Nosková [21]	(Australia) Daria Kasatkina [15]	(Poland) Magdalena Fręch [28]
(Romania) Jaqueline Cristian	(Greece) Maria Sakkari	(Germany) Laura Siegemund	Anna Kalinskaya [29]
2nd round out
Polina Kudermetova	(France) Elsa Jacquemot	(New Zealand) Lulu Sun	(Philippines) Alexandra Eala
(Czech Republic) Tereza Valentová (Q)	(Indonesia) Janice Tjen (Q)	(United States) McCartney Kessler [32]	(United States) Brooke Mahagony
Anna Blinkova	Anastasia Pavlyuchenkova	Liudmila Samsonova [17]	(Switzerland) Belinda Bencic [16]
(United States) Caty McNally (WC)	(Japan) Moyuka Uchijima	(Latvia) Jeļena Ostapenko [25]	Anastasia Potapova
(Mexico) Renata Zarazúa	(Turkey) Zeynep Sönmez	(Germany) Eva Lys	(Romania) Sorana Cîrstea (PR)
Kamilla Rakhimova	(United States) Hailey Baptiste	(United States) Peyton Stearns	(Croatia) Donna Vekić
(Australia) Maya Joint	(United States) Ashlyn Krueger	(Switzerland) Viktorija Golubic	(Hungary) Anna Bondár
(China) Wang Xinyu	Anastasia Zakharova	(Kazakhstan) Yulia Putintseva	(Netherlands) Suzan Lamens
1st round out
(Switzerland) Rebeka Masarova	(Spain) Nuria Párrizas Díaz	(Czech Republic) Marie Bouzková	(Canada) Rebecca Marino (Q)
(United States) Alyssa Ahn (WC)	(Colombia) Camila Osorio	(United States) Claire Liu (Q)	(Denmark) Clara Tauson [14]
(United States) Julieta Pareja (WC)	(Italy) Lucia Bronzetti	(Japan) Ena Shibahara (Q)	Veronika Kudermetova [24]
(Poland) Magda Linette	Oksana Selekhmeteva (Q)	Aliaksandra Sasnovich	(Australia) Destanee Aiava (Q)
(Egypt) Mayar Sherif	(Ukraine) Yuliia Starodubtseva	(United States) Hina Inoue (Q)	(Ukraine) Dayana Yastremska [30]
(China) Yuan Yue	(France) Léolia Jeanjean	(Slovakia) Rebecca Šramková	(China) Zhang Shuai (Q)
(China) Wang Yafan (PR)	(Switzerland) Jil Teichmann	(Serbia) Olga Danilović	(Canada) Victoria Mboko [22]
(China) Wang Xiyu (Q)	(Croatia) Antonia Ružić	(China) Zhu Lin (PR)	(United States) Alycia Parks
(United States) Madison Keys [6]	(Czech Republic) Petra Kvitová (PR)	(United States) Katie Volynets (Q)	(United Kingdom) Katie Boulter
(Hungary) Dalma Gálfi (Q)	(United Kingdom) Francesca Jones (Q)	(Argentina) Solana Sierra	(United States) Venus Williams (WC)
(Romania) Elena-Gabriela Ruse	(France) Caroline Garcia (WC)	(Czech Republic) Kateřina Siniaková	(Belgium) Greet Minnen
(Australia) Talia Gibson (WC)	(Latvia) Darja Semeņistaja (Q)	(Spain) Jéssica Bouzas Maneiro	(Australia) Ajla Tomljanović
(Australia) Kimberly Birrell	(Andorra) Victoria Jiménez Kasintseva (Q)	(United States) Danielle Collins	(United States) Sofia Kenin [26]
(United Kingdom) Sonay Kartal	(France) Loïs Boisson	(Germany) Tatjana Maria	(Ukraine) Elina Svitolina [12]
(Latvia) Anastasija Sevastova (PR)	(United States) Caroline Dolehide	(Armenia) Elina Avanesyan	Diana Shnaider [20]
(United States) Clervie Ngounoue (WC)	(Italy) Elisabetta Cocciaretto	(United States) Valerie Glozman (WC)	(Colombia) Emiliana Arango

== Point and prize money distribution ==
=== Point distribution ===
==== Senior points ====
Event	W	F	SF	QF	Round of 16	Round of 32	Round of 64	Round of 128	Q	Q3	Q2	Q1
Men's singles	2000	1300	800	400	200	100	50	10	30	16	8	0
Men's doubles	2000	1200	720	360	180	90	0	N/A				
Women's singles	2000	1300	780	430	240	130	70	10	40	30	20	2
Women's doubles	2000	1300	780	430	240	130	10	N/A				

==== Wheelchair points ====
Event	W	F	SF	QF	Round of 16
Singles	800	500	375	200	100
Doubles	800	500	375	100	N/A
Quad singles	800	500	375	200	100
Quad doubles	800	500	375	100	N/A

=== Prize money ===
The 2025 singles champions will each receive $5,000,000, a 38.89% increase over the previous year's payout, while runners-up will take home $2,500,000, also up by 38.89%. First-round losers in the main draw will earn $110,000 (up 10% from 2024), and players losing in the first round of qualifying will receive $27,500. Overall, prize money across all rounds and events saw double-digit percentage increases, with total compensation rising 113% since 2015.

Event	W	F	SF	QF	Round of 16	Round of 32	Round of 64	Round of 128	Q3	Q2	Q1
Singles	$5,000,000	$2,500,000	$1,260,000	$660,000	$400,000	$237,000	$154,000	$110,000	$57,200	$41,800	$27,500
Doubles (Note: per team)	$1,000,000	$500,000	$250,000	$125,000	$75,000	$45,000	$30,000	N/A			
Mixed Doubles	$1,000,000	$400,000	$200,000	$100,000	$20,000	N/A					

== Notes ==
Preceded by 2025 Wimbledon Championships	Grand Slams	Succeeded by 2026 Australian Open
