= Wheelchair tennis at the 2024 Summer Paralympics – Men's singles =

Wheelchair tennis – Men's singles at the XVII Paralympic Games
- Paralympic wheelchair tennis
- Venue: Stade Roland Garros
- Date: 30 August – 7 September 2024
- Competitors: 48 from 22 nations

Medalists
1st place, gold medalist(s)		Tokito Oda	Japan
2nd place, silver medalist(s)		Alfie Hewett	Great Britain
3rd place, bronze medalist(s)		Gustavo Fernández	Argentina

Men's singles
- Wheelchair tennis at the 2024 Summer Paralympics

Events
Singles	men	women	quad
Doubles	men	women	quad
- Summer Paralympics

The men's singles wheelchair tennis tournament at the 2024 Paralympic Games in France was held at the Stade Roland Garros in Paris from 30 August to 7 September 2024.

Japan's Tokito Oda defeated Great Britain's Alfie Hewett in the final, 6–2, 4–6, 7–5 to win the gold medal in men's singles wheelchair tennis at the 2024 Paris Paralympics. At the age of 18 years and 123 days, Oda became the youngest player to win Paralympic men's singles gold medal, overtaking previous record-holder Ricky Molier of the Netherlands, who was 20 years and 70 days in 1996 in Atlanta.

In the bronze medal match, Argentina's Gustavo Fernandez defeated Spain's Martín de la Puente to win the first Paralympic medal in wheelchair tennis for Argentina and South America.

Japan's Shingo Kunieda was the defending gold medalist, but he did not participate in this edition as he retired from wheelchair tennis in January 2023.

== Seeds ==
1. Alfie Hewett (GBR) (final, silver medalist)
2. Tokito Oda (JPN) (champion, gold medalist)
3. Martín de la Puente (ESP) (semifinals, fourth place)
4. Gustavo Fernández (ARG) (semifinals, bronze medalist)
5. Gordon Reid (GBR) (quarterfinals)
6. Tom Egberink (NED) (quarterfinals)
7. Stéphane Houdet (FRA) (quarterfinals)
8. Joachim Gérard (BEL) (second round)
9. Takuya Miki (JPN) (third round)
10. Ruben Spaargaren (NED) (quarterfinals)
11. Daniel Caverzaschi (ESP) (third round)
12. Takashi Sanada (JPN) (third round)
13. Casey Ratzlaff (USA) (second round)
14. Alexander Cataldo (CHI) (third round)
15. Maikel Scheffers (NED) (third round)
16. Daisuke Arai (JPN) (third round)

Click on the seed number of a player to go to their draw section.

== Draw ==
Key

- Q = Qualifier
- WC = Wild card
- LL = Lucky loser
- Alt = Alternate
- ITF = ITF entry
- PR = Protected ranking
- SR = Special ranking
- SE = Special exempt
- JE = Junior exempt
- JR = Junior Accelerator Programme entrant
- CO = College Accelerator Programme entrant
- NG = Next Gen Accelerator Program entrant
- w/o = Walkover
- r = Retired
- d = Defaulted
- BPC = Bipartite Invitation

=== Finals ===
Quarterfinals
1	Alfie Hewett (GBR)	6	6
10	Ruben Spaargaren (NED)	1	4
3	Martín de la Puente (ESP)	6	4	6
7	Stéphane Houdet (FRA)	2	6	1
5	Gordon Reid (GBR)	0	6
4	Gustavo Fernández (ARG)	6	7
6	Tom Egberink (NED)	4	1
2	Tokito Oda (JPN)	6	6

Semifinals
1	Alfie Hewett (GBR)	6	6
3	Martín de la Puente (ESP)	2	0
4	Gustavo Fernández (ARG)	2	5
2	Tokito Oda (JPN)	6	7

Gold medal match
1	Alfie Hewett (GBR)	2	6	5
2	Tokito Oda (JPN)	6	4	7
Bronze medal match
3	Martín de la Puente (ESP)	1	2
4	Gustavo Fernández (ARG)	6	6

=== Top half ===
==== Section 1 ====
First round
S Lysov (ISR)	7	6
B Tapia (CHI)	5	1
A Sikhosana (RSA)	6	7
G Carneiro Silva (BRA)	4	5

Second round
1	A Hewett (GBR)	6	6
S Lysov (ISR)	0	1
A Sikhosana (RSA)	1	0
16	D Arai (JPN)	6	6

Third round
1	A Hewett (GBR)	7	6
16	D Arai (JPN)	5	2

==== Section 2 ====
First round
ZX Ji (CHN)	6	6
E Siscar (ESP)	1	4
A S Borhan (MAS)	1	2
G Menguy (FRA)	6	6

Second round
10	R Spaargaren (NED)	6	6
ZX Ji (CHN)	3	4
G Menguy (FRA)	3	6	7^{7}
8	J Gérard (BEL)	6	3	6^{4}

Third round
10	R Spaargaren (NED)	6	6
G Menguy (FRA)	4	1

==== Section 3 ====
First round
E Casco (ARG)	7	6
A Parker (AUS)	5	4
S-b Han (KOR)	2	6	2
N Langmann (AUT)	6	0	6

Second round
3	M de la Puente (ESP)	6	6
E Casco (ARG)	2	0
N Langmann (AUT)	4	1
15	M Scheffers (NED)	6	6

Third round
3	M de la Puente (ESP)	6	6
15	M Scheffers (NED)	2	2

==== Section 4 ====
First round
J P Gil (CRC)	3	1
C Stroud (USA)	6	6
D Ward (GBR)	6	7
S Himam (MAR)	3	6

Second round
12	T Sanada (JPN)	6	6
C Stroud (USA)	1	2
D Ward (GBR)	2	1
7	S Houdet (FRA)	6	6

Third round
12	T Sanada (JPN)	2	5
7	S Houdet (FRA)	6	7

=== Bottom half ===
==== Section 5 ====
First round
S Dharmasena (SRI)	6	6
J Reigler (AUT)	1	3
JH Ding (CHN)	6	2	6
L Boukartacha (MAR)	1	6	4

Second round
5	G Reid (GBR)	6	6
S Dharmasena (SRI)	0	0
JH Ding (CHN)	2	1
9	T Miki (JPN)	6	6

Third round
5	G Reid (GBR)	6	6
9	T Miki (JPN)	1	1

==== Section 6 ====
First round
L Arca (ITA)	2	5
A Berdichevsky (ISR)	6	7
M ter Hofte (NED)	4	2
F Cattanéo (FRA)	6	6

Second round
14	A Cataldo (CHI)	6	3	6
A Berdichevsky (ISR)	1	6	3
F Cattanéo (FRA)	1	4
4	G Fernández (ARG)	6	6

Third round
14	A Cataldo (CHI)	0	1
4	G Fernández (ARG)	6	6

==== Section 7 ====
First round
SJ Dong (CHN)	6	6	6
H Habal (IRQ)	4	7	1
M Y Yusuf (MAS)	2	3
H-w Im (KOR)	6	6

Second round
6	T Egberink (NED)	6	6
SJ Dong (CHN)	0	0
H-w Im (KOR)	6	4	6
11	D Caverzaschi (ESP)	4	6	7

Third round
6	T Egberink (NED)	7	7
11	D Caverzaschi (ESP)	6	6

==== Section 8 ====
First round
D Rodrigues (BRA)	6	6
B Weekes (AUS)	0	1
B Bartram (GBR)	6	6
G Laget (FRA)	4	4

Second round
13	C Ratzlaff (USA)	2	6^{2}
D Rodrigues (BRA)	6	7^{7}
B Bartram (GBR)	2	6^{4}
2	T Oda (JPN)	6	7^{7}

Third round
D Rodrigues (BRA)	0	1
2	T Oda (JPN)	6	6
