= Wheelchair tennis at the 2024 Summer Paralympics – Quad doubles =

Wheelchair tennis – Quad doubles at the XVII Paralympic Games
- Paralympic wheelchair tennis
- Venue: Stade Roland Garros
- Date: 30 August – 4 September 2024
- Competitors: 12 from 6 nations

Medalists
1st place, gold medalist(s)		Sam Schröder; Niels Vink	Netherlands
2nd place, silver medalist(s)		Andy Lapthorne; Gregory Slade	Great Britain
3rd place, bronze medalist(s)		Donald Ramphadi; Lucas Sithole	South Africa

Quad doubles
- Wheelchair tennis at the 2024 Summer Paralympics

Events
Singles	men	women	quad
Doubles	men	women	quad
- Summer Paralympics

Defending gold medalists Sam Schröder and Niels Vink of the Netherlands defeated Andy Lapthorne and Gregory Slade of Great Britain in the final, 6–1, 6–1 to win the gold medal in quad doubles wheelchair tennis at the 2024 Paralympic Games.

The event was held at the Stade Roland Garros in Paris, France from 30 August to 4 September 2024.

== Seeds ==
1. Sam Schröder / Niels Vink (NED) (champions)
2. Andy Lapthorne / Gregory Slade (GBR) (final)

Click on the seed number of a player to go to their draw section.

== Draw ==
Key

- Q = Qualifier
- WC = Wild card
- LL = Lucky loser
- Alt = Alternate
- ITF = ITF entry
- PR = Protected ranking
- SR = Special ranking
- SE = Special exempt
- JE = Junior exempt
- JR = Junior Accelerator Programme entrant
- CO = College Accelerator Programme entrant
- NG = Next Gen Accelerator Program entrant
- w/o = Walkover
- r = Retired
- d = Defaulted
- BPC = Bipartite Invitation

Quarterfinals
Francisco Cayulef (CHI); Diego Pérez (CHI)	4	7^{7}	[6]
Donald Ramphadi (RSA); Lucas Sithole (RSA)	6	6^{1}	[10]
Leandro Pena (BRA); Ymanitu Silva (BRA)	6	6
Uğur Altınel (TUR); Ahmet Kaplan (TUR)	2	1

Semifinals
1	Sam Schröder (NED); Niels Vink (NED)	6	6
Donald Ramphadi (RSA); Lucas Sithole (RSA)	1	1
Leandro Pena (BRA); Ymanitu Silva (BRA)	1	5
2	Andy Lapthorne (GBR); Gregory Slade (GBR)	6	7

Gold medal match
1	Sam Schröder (NED); Niels Vink (NED)	6	6
2	Andy Lapthorne (GBR); Gregory Slade (GBR)	1	1
Bronze medal match
Donald Ramphadi (RSA); Lucas Sithole (RSA)	6	4	[10]
Leandro Pena (BRA); Ymanitu Silva (BRA)	2	6	[8]
