= Wheelchair tennis at the 2024 Summer Paralympics – Men's doubles =

Wheelchair tennis – Men's doubles at the XVII Paralympic Games
- Paralympic wheelchair tennis
- Venue: Stade Roland Garros
- Date: 31 August – 6 September 2024
- Competitors: 40 from 16 nations

Medalists
1st place, gold medalist(s)		Alfie Hewett; Gordon Reid	Great Britain
2nd place, silver medalist(s)		Takuya Miki; Tokito Oda	Japan
3rd place, bronze medalist(s)		Daniel Caverzaschi; Martín de la Puente	Spain

Men's doubles
- Wheelchair tennis at the 2024 Summer Paralympics

Events
Singles	men	women	quad
Doubles	men	women	quad
- Summer Paralympics

The men's doubles wheelchair tennis tournament at the 2024 Paralympic Games in France will be held at the Stade Roland Garros in Paris from 31 August to 6 September 2024.

Host nation France's Stéphane Houdet and Nicolas Peifer were the defending gold medalists.

== Seeds ==
1. Alfie Hewett / Gordon Reid (GBR) (champions)
2. Takuya Miki / Tokito Oda (JPN) (final)
3. Tom Egberink / Maikel Scheffers (NED) (quarterfinals)
4. Frédéric Cattanéo / Stéphane Houdet (FRA) (semifinals)
5. Daniel Caverzaschi / Martín de la Puente (ESP) (semifinals)
6. Daisuke Arai / Takashi Sanada (JPN) (second round)
7. Ruben Spaargaren / Marten ter Hofte (NED) (quarterfinals)
8. Han Sung-bong / Im Ho-won (KOR) (quarterfinals)

Click on the seed number of a player to go to their draw section.

== Draw ==
Key

- Q = Qualifier
- WC = Wild card
- LL = Lucky loser
- Alt = Alternate
- ITF = ITF entry
- PR = Protected ranking
- SR = Special ranking
- SE = Special exempt
- JE = Junior exempt
- JR = Junior Accelerator Programme entrant
- CO = College Accelerator Programme entrant
- NG = Next Gen Accelerator Program entrant
- w/o = Walkover
- r = Retired
- d = Defaulted
- BPC = Bipartite Invitation

=== Finals ===
Semifinals
1	A Hewett (GBR); G Reid (GBR)	6	6
4	F Cattanéo (FRA); S Houdet (FRA)	4	3
5	D Caverzaschi (ESP); M de la Puente (ESP)	7	2	[8]
2	Takuya Miki (JPN); Tokito Oda (JPN)	5	6	[10]

Gold medal match
1	Alfie Hewett (GBR); Gordon Reid (GBR)	6	6
2	Takuya Miki (JPN); Tokito Oda (JPN)	2	1
Bronze medal match
4	F Cattanéo (FRA); S Houdet (FRA)	6	4	[5]
5	D Caverzaschi (ESP); M de la Puente (ESP)	4	6	[10]

=== Top half ===
==== Section 1 ====
First round
E Casco (ARG); G Fernández (ARG)	6	6
C Ratzlaff (USA); C Stroud (USA)	3	4

Second round
1	A Hewett (GBR); G Reid (GBR)	6	6
A Cataldo (CHI); B Tapia (CHI)	1	3
E Casco (ARG); G Fernández (ARG)	5	3
7	R Spaargaren (NED); M ter Hofte (NED)	7	6

Quarterfinals
1	A Hewett (GBR); G Reid (GBR)	6	6
7	R Spaargaren (NED); M ter Hofte (NED)	2	1

==== Section 2 ====
First round
A Parker (AUS); B Weekes (AUS)	5	6	[8]
G Carneiro Silva (BRA); D Rodrigues (BRA)	7	2	[10]

Second round
4	F Cattanéo (FRA); S Houdet (FRA)	6	6
A Berdichevsky (ISR); S Lysov (ISR)	2	1
G Carneiro Silva (BRA); D Rodrigues (BRA)	4	7	[10]
6	D Arai (JPN); T Sanada (JPN)	6	5	[7]

Quarterfinals
4	F Cattanéo (FRA); S Houdet (FRA)	6	6
G Carneiro Silva (BRA); D Rodrigues (BRA)	3	0

=== Bottom half ===
==== Section 3 ====
First round
L Boukartacha (MAR); S Himam (MAR)	3	6	[5]
B Bartram (GBR); D Ward (GBR)	6	3	[10]

Second round
5	D Caverzaschi (ESP); M de la Puente (ESP)	6	6
M Y Yusuf (MAS); A S Borhan (MAS)	2	3
B Bartram (GBR); D Ward (GBR)	2	5
3	T Egberink (NED); M Scheffers (NED)	6	7

Quarterfinals
5	D Caverzaschi (ESP); M de la Puente (ESP)	7	1	[10]
3	T Egberink (NED); M Scheffers (NED)	5	6	[3]

==== Section 4 ====
First round
G Laget (FRA); G Menguy (FRA)	3	2
SJ Dong (CHN); ZX Ji (CHN)	6	6

Second round
8	S-b Han (KOR); H-w Im (KOR)	6	6
N Langmann (AUT); J Reigler (AUT)	2	0
SJ Dong (CHN); ZX Ji (CHN)	4	0
2	T Miki (JPN); T Oda (JPN)	6	6

Quarterfinals
8	S-b Han (KOR); H-w Im (KOR)	1	4
2	T Miki (JPN); T Oda (JPN)	6	6
