= Wheelchair tennis at the 2024 Summer Paralympics – Women's singles =

Wheelchair tennis – Women's singles at the XVII Paralympic Games
- Paralympic wheelchair tennis
- Venue: Stade Roland Garros
- Date: 31 August – 6 September 2024
- Competitors: 32 from 15 nations

Medalists
| 1st place, gold medalist(s) | | Yui Kamiji | Japan |
| 2nd place, silver medalist(s) | | Diede de Groot | Netherlands |
| 3rd place, bronze medalist(s) | | Aniek van Koot | Netherlands |

Women's singles
- Wheelchair tennis at the 2024 Summer Paralympics

Events
| Singles | men | women | quad |
| Doubles | men | women | quad |
| ← 2020 · | Summer Paralympics | · 2028 → |

The women's singles wheelchair tennis tournament at the 2024 Paralympic Games in France was held at the Stade Roland Garros in Paris from 31 August to 6 September 2024.

Netherlands' Diede de Groot was the defending gold medalist. She won the silver medal. The gold medal was earned by Yui Kamiji of Japan. The second Dutch player, Aniek van Koot, obtained the bronze medal.

== Seeds ==
1. Diede de Groot (NED) (final)
2. Yui Kamiji (JPN) (champion)
3. Aniek van Koot (NED) (semifinals)
4. Wang Ziying (CHN) (semifinals)
5. Angélica Bernal (COL) (quarterfinals)
6. Zhu Zhenzhen (CHN) (quarterfinals)
7. Kgothatso Montjane (RSA) (withdrew)
8. Dana Mathewson (USA) (first round)

Click on the seed number of a player to go to their draw section.

== Draw ==
=== Key ===
- Q = Qualifier
- WC = Wild card
- LL = Lucky loser
- Alt = Alternate
- ITF = ITF entry
- PR = Protected ranking
- SR = Special ranking
- SE = Special exempt
- JE = Junior exempt
- JR = Junior Accelerator Programme entrant
- CO = College Accelerator Programme entrant
- NG = Next Gen Accelerator Program entrant
- w/o = Walkover
- r = Retired
- d = Defaulted
- BPC = Bipartite Invitation

=== Finals ===
Semifinals
1 | Diede de Groot (NED) | 6 | 6
4 | Wang Ziying (CHN) | 2 | 1
3 | Aniek van Koot (NED) | 0 | 6 | 4
2 | Yui Kamiji (JPN) | 6 | 4 | 6

Gold medal match
1 | Diede de Groot (NED) | 6 | 3 | 4
2 | Yui Kamiji (JPN) | 4 | 6 | 6
Bronze medal match
4 | Wang Ziying (CHN) | 6^{3} | 1
3 | Aniek van Koot (NED) | 7^{7} | 6

=== Top half ===
==== Section 1 ====
First round
1 | D de Groot (NED) | 6 | 6
K Krüger (GER) | 1 | 0
M Zikri (ISR) | 6 | 6
N Awane (MAR) | 0 | 0
E Mörch (FRA) | 0 | 0
M Ohtani (JPN) | 6 | 6
LY Guo (CHN) | w/o
7 | K Montjane (RSA)

Second round
1 | D de Groot (NED) | 6 | 6
M Zikri (ISR) | 0 | 0
M Ohtani (JPN) | 4 | 6^{5}
LY Guo (CHN) | 6 | 7^{7}

Quarterfinals
1 | D de Groot (NED) | 7^{7} | 6
LY Guo (CHN) | 6^{3} | 3

==== Section 2 ====
First round
4 | ZY Wang (CHN) | 6 | 6
J Bos (NED) | 1 | 2
M Phelps (USA) | 6 | 6
A Breakwell (GBR) | 3 | 4
S Takamuro (JPN) | 6 | 6
M Moreno (ARG) | 1 | 0
P Déroulède (FRA) | 3 | 1
5 | A Bernal (COL) | 6 | 6

Second round
4 | ZY Wang (CHN) | 6 | 6
M Phelps (USA) | 0 | 3
S Takamuro (JPN) | 2 | 1
5 | A Bernal (COL) | 6 | 6

Quarterfinals
4 | ZY Wang (CHN) | 6 | 6
5 | A Bernal (COL) | 2 | 3

=== Bottom half ===
==== Section 3 ====
First round
8 | D Mathewson (USA) | 7 | 3 | 4
XH Li (CHN) | 5 | 6 | 6
L Shuker (GBR) | 6 | 7
C Fairbank (FRA) | 4 | 5
M Tanaka (JPN) | 6 | 7^{7}
S Khanthasit (THA) | 2 | 6^{3}
N Buob (SUI) | 2 | 3
3 | A van Koot (NED) | 6 | 6

Second round
XH Li (CHN) | 6 | 6
L Shuker (GBR) | 0 | 2
M Tanaka (JPN) | 0 | 2
3 | A van Koot (NED) | 6 | 6

Quarterfinals
XH Li (CHN) | 1 | 5
3 | A van Koot (NED) | 6 | 7

==== Section 4 ====
First round
6 | ZZ Zhu (CHN) | 6 | 1 | 6
L de Greef (NED) | 1 | 6 | 2
M Cabrillana (CHI) | 6 | 6
Z Rodríguez (COL) | 3 | 1
K Chasteau (FRA) | 6 | 6
S Benichi (MAR) | 0 | 1
M Venter (RSA) | 2 | 1
2 | Y Kamiji (JPN) | 6 | 6

Second round
6 | ZZ Zhu (CHN) | 6 | 6
M Cabrillana (CHI) | 0 | 4
K Chasteau (FRA) | 6^{4} | 0
2 | Y Kamiji (JPN) | 7^{7} | 6

Quarterfinals
6 | ZZ Zhu (CHN) | 1 | 2
2 | Y Kamiji (JPN) | 6 | 6
