= Cycling at the 2024 Summer Paralympics – Men's road time trial =

The men's road time trial cycling events at the 2024 Summer Paralympics took place on 4 September at Clichy-sois-Bois, Paris. Twelve events took place over twelve classifications. The T1-2 time trial, which takes in two classifications, is a 'factored' event, with times adjusted by classification to allow fair competition. All events (finals) were held on the same day (4 September).

== Classification ==
Cyclists are given a classification depending on the type and extent of their disability. The classification system allows cyclists to compete against others with a similar level of function. The class number indicates the severity of impairment with "1" being most impaired.

Cycling classes are:

- B: Blind and visually impaired cyclists use a Tandem bicycle with a sighted pilot on the front
- H 1–5: Cyclists with an impairment that affects their legs use a handcycle
- T 1–2: Cyclists with an impairment that affects their balance use a tricycle
- C 1–5: Cyclists with an impairment that affects their legs, arms, and/or trunk but are capable of using a standard bicycle

== Medal table ==
* Host nation (France)

Rank	NPC	Gold	Silver	Bronze	Total
1	France*	4	4	2	10
2	Netherlands	4	0	1	5
3	Spain	2	1	1	4
4	Italy	1	1	1	3
5	China	1	0	0	1
6	Belgium	0	2	2	4
7	Australia	0	1	1	2
7	Germany	0	1	1	2
9	Austria	0	1	0	1
9	Canada	0	1	0	1
11	Poland	0	0	1	1
11	Portugal	0	0	1	1
11	South Africa	0	0	1	1
Totals (13 entries)		12	12	12	36

== Medal summary ==
Classification	Gold		Silver		Bronze	
Time trials
B	Tristan Bangma Pilot: Patrick Bos; Netherlands	34:11.02	Elie de Carvalho Pilot: Mickaël Guichard; France	34:23.73	Vincent ter Schure Pilot: Timo Fransen; Netherlands	34:53.92
H1	Fabrizio Cornegliani; Italy	34:50.45	Maxime Hordies; Belgium	35:11.13	Nicolas Pieter du Preez; South Africa	36:07.05
H2	Sergio Garrote Muñoz; Spain	24:33.71	Luca Mazzone; Italy	25:18.83	Florian Jouanny; France	25:19.29
H3	Mathieu Bosredon; France	43:33.22	Johan Quaile; France	45:33.41	Martino Pini; Italy	46:13.69
H4	Jetze Plat; Netherlands	41:28.51	Thomas Fruehwirth; Austria	41:31.22	Jonas Van de Steene; Belgium	41:52.22
H5	Mitch Valize; Netherlands	41:01.59	Loïc Vergnaud; France	43:20.40	Luis Costa; Portugal	44:26.32
C1	Ricardo Ten Argilés; Spain	20:39.53	Michael Teuber; Germany	21:18.14	Zbigniew Maciejewski; Poland	21:18.94
C2	Alexandre Leaute; France	19:24.45	Ewoud Vromant; Belgium	19:26.61	Darren Hicks; Australia	19:40.08
C3	Thomas Peyroton-Dartet; France	38:28.80	Eduardo Santas Asensio; Spain	39:12.71	Matthias Schindler; Germany	39:21.35
C4	Kévin Le Cunff; France	36:46.49	Gatien Le Rousseau; France	37:18.38	Damian Ramos Sanchez; Spain	38:05.94
C5	Daniel Abraham Gebru; Netherlands	35:51.79	Alistair Donohoe; Australia	36:18.66	Dorian Foulon; France	36:49.84
T1-2	Chen Jianxin; China	21:35.78 (24:41.91)	Nathan Clement; Canada	22:53.36 (26:10.63)	Tim Celen; Belgium	23:27.64 (23:27.64)
