= Mogapeng =

- Location within Limpopo Location within South Africa
- Coordinates: 24.0679°S 30.2789°E
- Country: South Africa
- Province: Limpopo
- District: Mopani
- Municipality: Greater Tzaneen

Area
  - Total: 2.80 km^{2} (1.08 sq mi)

Population
  - Total: 2,702
  - Density: 965/km^{2} (2,500/sq mi)
- Time zone: UTC+2 (SAST)
- Area code: 015

Mogapeng is a village in the municipality of Greater Tzaneen, Mopani District, Limpopo, South Africa. As of the 2011 Census, it has a population of 2,702 (in 686 households) and an area of 2.80 square kilometres (1.08 mi^{2}).

Mogapeng is located in the monsoon influenced humid subtropical climate (Cwa) of the Köppen climate classification system.

Notable people from Mogapeng include music producer Rupert Bopape, who died at his home there in 2012, and Donald Ramphadi, winner of the French Open's quad wheelchair tennis doubles tournament and a Paralympics bronze medalist.
