= Anderson Parker =

Australian wheelchair tennis player

- Country (sports): Australia
- Born: 1998 (age 27–28)

Singles

Grand Slam singles results
- Australian Open: 1R (2024, 2025, 2026)

Doubles

Grand Slam doubles results
- Australian Open: QF (2024, 2025, 2026)

Anderson Parker (born 1998) is an Australian wheelchair tennis player. He competed at the 2024 Paris Paralympics.

== Personal ==
Anderson was born in 1998 with talipes, a congenital foot deformity.

== Tennis ==
Parker played tennis at young age but his talipes condition forced him to use a wheelchair. Parker was ranked number six in junior wheelchair tennis rankings. He left the sport after his disability was reclassified. After leaving wheelchair tennis, he played wheelchair basketball. He returned to wheelchair tennis in 2022 after changes to classification rules. At the 2023 Australian Wheelchair Tennis National Championships, Melbourne Park he won open men's singles and doubles titles.

In 2024, Anderson won the Brisbane Wheelchair Classic defeating Ben Weekes. It was his third ITF wheelchair tennis singles title.

At the 2024 Paris Paralympics, he lost in the round of 64 in the Men's Singles and round of 32 with Ben Weekes in Men's Doubles.

Parker trains regularly in Sydney alongside Ben Weekes.
