= Gregory Slade =

British wheelchair tennis player

- Country (sports): Great Britain
- Born: 19 May 2002 (age 24) Redhill, England
- Plays: Right-handed

Singles
- Career record: 20–17
- Career titles: 5
- Highest ranking: No. 14 (3 July 2023)
- Current ranking: No. 18 (26 August 2024)

Grand Slam singles results
- Australian Open: 1R (2024, 2026)
- Wimbledon: SF (2025)

Other tournaments
- Paralympic Games: QF (2024)

Doubles
- Career record: 19–10
- Career titles: 14
- Highest ranking: No. 13 (23 May 2022)
- Current ranking: No. 13 (26 August 2024)

Grand Slam doubles results
- Australian Open: QF (2024, 2026)
- Wimbledon: F (2025)

Other doubles tournaments
- Paralympic Games: F (2024)
Medal record
Men's wheelchair tennis
Representing Great Britain
Paralympic Games
Silver medal – second place	2024 Paris	Quad doubles
- Last updated on: 4 September 2024.

Gregory Slade (born 19 May 2002) is a British wheelchair tennis player.

== Early life and medical background ==
Slade was born on 19 May 2002 in Dorking, Surrey, England, and was diagnosed with cerebral palsy, which left him with quadriplegic impairment affecting all four of his limbs.

== Career ==
He won a silver medal at the 2024 Summer Paralympics in the quad doubles playing alongside Andy Lapthorne.

== Personal life ==
He is openly gay.
