= Martín de la Puente =

Spanish wheelchair tennis player

- Born: 22 June 1999 (age 27) Vigo, Spain
- Turned pro: 2014
- Plays: Right-handed (one-handed backhand)

Singles
- Career record: 448-199
- Career titles: 31
- Highest ranking: No. 4 (24 June 2024)
- Current ranking: No. 4 (17 July 2023)

Grand Slam singles results
- Australian Open: F (2026)
- French Open: SF (2023, 2025)
- Wimbledon: F (2024)
- US Open: SF (2025)

Doubles
- Career record: 299-154
- Career titles: 44
- Highest ranking: No. 1 (7 November 2022)
- Current ranking: No. 4 (24 June 2024)

Grand Slam doubles results
- Australian Open: SF (2025)
- French Open: F (2023, 2026)
- Wimbledon: W (2025)
- US Open: W (2022)

Other doubles tournaments
- Masters Doubles: W (2022, 2025)
- Paralympic Games: Bronze medal (2024)
Medal record
Paralympic Games
Bronze medal – third place	2024 Paris	Doubles

Martín de la Puente Riobó (born 22 June 1999) is a Spanish professional wheelchair tennis player.

== Wheelchair tennis career ==
De la Puente is the 2022 US Open doubles champion with Nicolas Peifer and 2023 French Open wheelchair men's doubles finalist with Gustavo Fernandez. He is a former world No. 1 in the doubles rankings, achieved in November 2022.

He reached the doubles quarterfinals at the 2016 and 2020 Summer Paralympics, and became the second Spanish tennis paralympic player to reach the singles quarterfinals in the 2024 Summer Paralympics, after Daniel Caverzaschi the Games prior; he then became the first one to reach the singles semifinals. At the same Games, he reached the doubles semifinals for the first time for the Spanish tennis paralympic team along with fellow partner Caverzaschi. They won Spain's ever first medal in wheelchair tennis after obtaining a bronze medal in the men's doubles event.

Playing wheelchair tennis since he was ten years old, he admires Rafael Nadal as his idol.

== Proteus syndrome ==
De la Puente was born with Proteus syndrome, with fingers on one of his hands larger than on the other, and had his left foot amputated when he was eight years old.

== Career statistics ==
=== Performance timelines ===
==== Wheelchair singles ====
Tournament	2022	2023	2024	2025	2026	SR	W–L	Win %
Australian Open	A	QF	1R	SF	F	0 / 4	?–4	
French Open	QF	SF	1R	SF	SF	0 / 5	?–5	
Wimbledon	A	SF	F	SF	SF	0 / 4	?–4	
US Open	QF	QF	NH	SF		0 / 3	?–3	
Win–loss						0 / 16	?–16	

==== Wheelchair Doubles ====
Tournament	2022	2023	2024	2025	2026	SR	W–L	Win %
Australian Open	A	QF	QF	QF	QF	0 / 4	?–4	
French Open	SF	F	QF	QF	F (Note: de la Puenta received a walkover in thesemifinal of the 2026 French Open, which does not count as a win.)	0 / 5	?–5	
Wimbledon	A	SF	QF	W	SF	1 / 4	?–3	
US Open	W	1R	NH	QF		1 / 3	?–2	
Win–loss						2 / 16	?–?	

=== Grand Slam tournament finals ===
==== Wheelchair singles: 2 (2 runner-ups) ====
Result	Year	Championship	Surface	Opponents	Score
Loss	2024	Wimbledon	Grass	(United Kingdom) Alfie Hewett	2–6, 3–6
Loss	2026	Australian Open	Hard	(Japan) Tokito Oda	6–3, 2–6, 2–6

==== Wheelchair doubles: 4 (2 titles, 2 runner-ups) ====
Result	Year	Championship	Surface	Partner	Opponents	Score
Win	2022	US Open	Hard	(France) Nicolas Peifer	(United Kingdom) Alfie Hewett (United Kingdom) Gordon Reid	4–6, 7–5, [10–6]
Loss	2023	French Open	Clay	(Argentina) Gustavo Fernandez	(United Kingdom) Alfie Hewett (United Kingdom) Gordon Reid	6–7^{(9–11)}, 5–7
Win	2025	Wimbledon	Grass	(Netherlands) Ruben Spaargaren	(United Kingdom) Alfie Hewett (United Kingdom) Gordon Reid	7–6^{(7–1)}, 7–5
Loss	2026	French Open	Clay	(France) Stephane Houdet	(United Kingdom) Alfie Hewett (United Kingdom) Gordon Reid	2–6, 3–6
