= Tokito Oda =

Japanese wheelchair tennis player

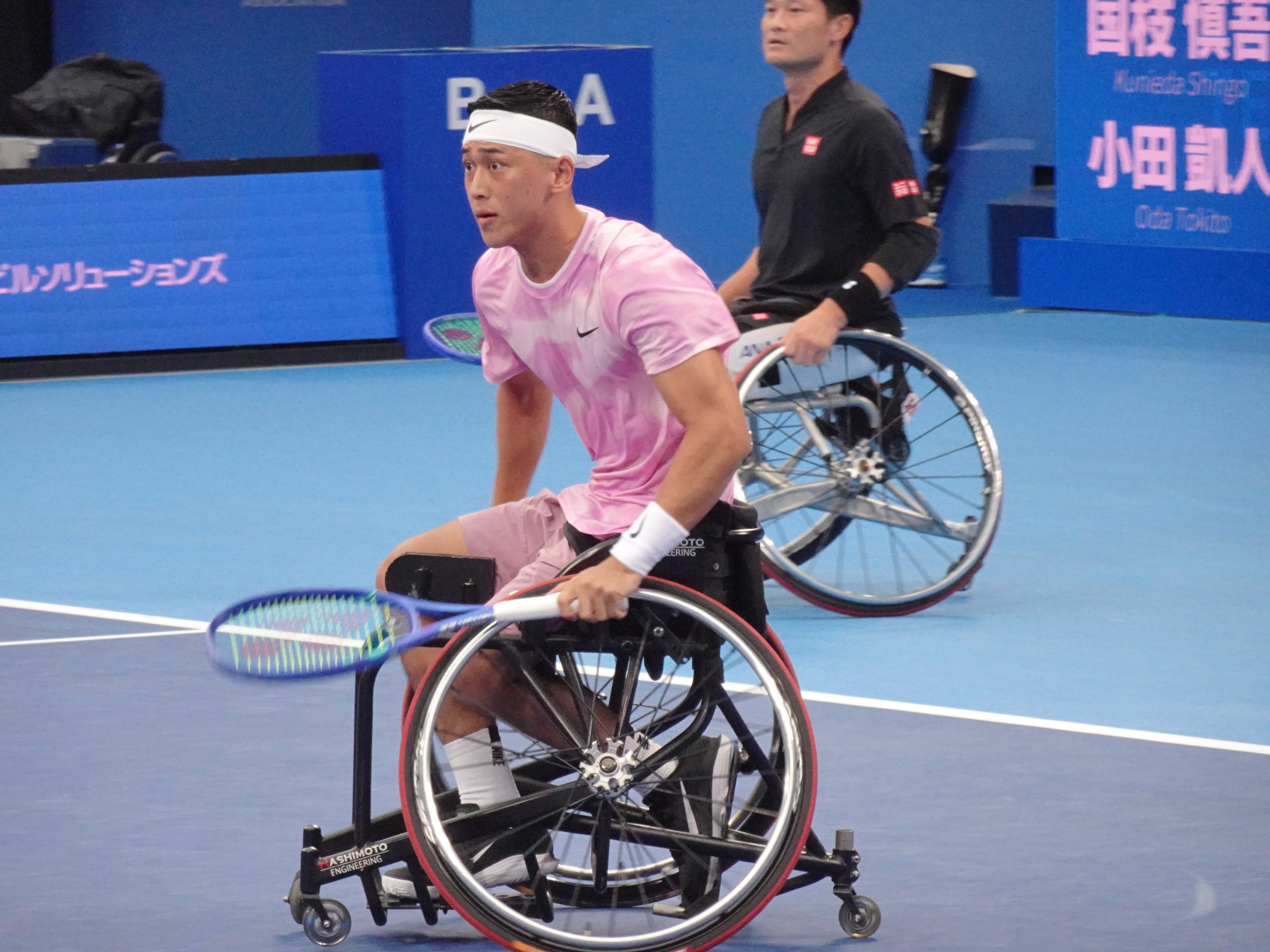
- Oda at the 100th All Japan Tennis Championships in Tokyo, Japan, 2025
- Country (sports): Japan
- Born: 8 May 2006 (age 20) Ichinomiya, Aichi, Japan

Singles
- Highest ranking: No. 1 (12 June 2023)
- Current ranking: No. 1 (23 September 2024)

Grand Slam singles results
- Australian Open: W (2024, 2026)
- French Open: W (2023, 2024, 2025, 2026)
- Wimbledon: W (2023, 2025, 2026)
- US Open: W (2025)

Other tournaments
- Masters: W (2022, 2024, 2025)
- Paralympic Games: Gold Medal (2024)

Doubles
- Highest ranking: No. 3 (11 March 2024)
- Current ranking: No. 9 (14 July 2025)

Grand Slam doubles results
- Australian Open: W (2026)
- French Open: F (2024, 2025)
- Wimbledon: F (2023, 2024, 2026)
- US Open: W (2025)

Other doubles tournaments
- Masters Doubles: SF (2022)
- Paralympic Games: Silver Medal (2024)
Medal record
Men's wheelchair tennis
Representing Japan
Paralympic Games
Gold medal – first place	2024 Paris	Men's singles
Silver medal – second place	2024 Paris	Men's doubles
Asian Para Games
Gold medal – first place	2022 Hangzhou	Men's singles

Tokito Oda (小田 凱人, Oda Tokito, born 8 May 2006) is a Japanese professional wheelchair tennis player.

== Wheelchair tennis career ==
He has won ten major singles titles, eight of them as a teenager, as well as a gold medal at the 2024 Paris Paralympics, completing the career Golden Slam. By winning the 2023 French Open, he became the youngest man in the Open Era to win a major in any discipline, at 17 years and 33 days old. Oda has also won two major titles in doubles, and a Paralympic silver medal.

Oda is competing in New York City in September 2026 in both the men's wheelchair singles and, partnering Gustavo Fernandez of Argentina, the men's wheelchair doubles events at the 2026 US Open.

== Career statistics ==
=== Grand Slam performance timelines ===
Key
W	F	SF	QF	#R	RR	Q#	DNQ	A	NH

(W) winner; (F) finalist; (SF) semifinalist; (QF) quarterfinalist; (#R) rounds 4, 3, 2, 1; (RR) round-robin stage; (Q#) qualification round; (DNQ) did not qualify; (A) absent; (NH) not held; (SR) strike rate (events won / competed); (W–L) win–loss record.
To avoid confusion and double counting, these charts are updated at the conclusion of a tournament or when the player's participation has ended.

==== Wheelchair singles ====
Tournament	2022	2023	2024	2025	2026	SR	W–L	Win %
Grand Slam tournaments
Australian Open	A	F	W	F	W	2 / 4	14–2	88%
French Open	SF	W	W	W	W	4 / 5	18–1	95%
Wimbledon	QF	W	SF	W	W	3 / 5	13–2	87%
US Open	QF	1R	NH	W	F	1 / 4	8–3	73%
Win–loss	3–3	10–2	10–1	15–1	15–1	10 / 18	53–8	88%

==== Wheelchair doubles ====
Tournament	2022	2023	2024	2025	2026	SR	W–L	Win %
Grand Slam tournaments
Australian Open	A	QF	F	SF	W	1 / 4	6–3	67%
French Open	QF	SF	F	F	SF	0 / 5	6–5	55%
Wimbledon	SF	F	F	SF	F	0 / 5	6–5	55%
US Open	SF	F	NH	W		1 / 3	6–2	57%
Win–loss	1–3	4–4	6–3	7–3	4–1	2 / 17	22–14	60%

===== Grand Slam tournament finals =====
====== Wheelchair singles: 13 (10 titles, 3 runner-ups) ======
Result	Year	Tournament	Surface	Opponent	Score
Loss	2023	Australian Open	Hard	(United Kingdom) Alfie Hewett	3–6, 1–6
Win	2023	French Open	Clay	(United Kingdom) Alfie Hewett	6–1, 6–4
Win	2023	Wimbledon	Grass	(United Kingdom) Alfie Hewett	6–4, 6–2
Win	2024	Australian Open	Hard	(United Kingdom) Alfie Hewett	6–2, 6–4
Win	2024	French Open (2)	Clay	(Argentina) Gustavo Fernández	7–5, 6–3
Loss	2025	Australian Open	Hard	(United Kingdom) Alfie Hewett	4–6, 4–6
Win	2025	French Open (3)	Clay	(United Kingdom) Alfie Hewett	6–4, 7–6^{(8–6)}
Win	2025	Wimbledon (2)	Grass	(United Kingdom) Alfie Hewett	3–6, 7–5, 6–2
Win	2025	US Open	Hard	(Argentina) Gustavo Fernández	6–3, 3–6, 7–6^{(13–11)}
Win	2026	Australian Open (2)	Hard	(Spain) Martín de la Puente	3–6, 6–2, 6–2
Win	2026	French Open (4)	Clay	(United Kingdom) Alfie Hewett	6–3, 6–3
Win	2026	Wimbledon (3)	Grass	(United Kingdom) Alfie Hewett	6–1, 6–1
Loss	2026	US Open	Hard	(United Kingdom) Alfie Hewett	0–6, 6–7^{(5–7)}

====== Wheelchair doubles: 9 (2 titles, 7 runner-ups) ======
Result	Year	Championship	Surface	Partner	Opponents	Score
Loss	2023	Wimbledon	Grass	(Japan) Takuya Miki	(United Kingdom) Alfie Hewett (United Kingdom) Gordon Reid	6–3, 0–6, 3–6
Loss	2023	US Open	Hard	(Japan) Takuya Miki	(France) Stéphane Houdet (Japan) Takashi Sanada	4–6, 4–6
Loss	2024	Australian Open	Hard	(Japan) Takuya Miki	(United Kingdom) Alfie Hewett (United Kingdom) Gordon Reid	3–6, 2–6
Loss	2024	French Open	Clay	(Japan) Takuya Miki	(United Kingdom) Alfie Hewett (United Kingdom) Gordon Reid	1–6, 4–6
Loss	2024	Wimbledon	Grass	(Japan) Takuya Miki	(United Kingdom) Alfie Hewett (United Kingdom) Gordon Reid	4–6, 6–7^{(2–7)}
Loss	2025	French Open	Clay	(France) Stéphane Houdet	(United Kingdom) Alfie Hewett (United Kingdom) Gordon Reid	4–6, 6–1, [7–10]
Win	2025	US Open	Hard	(Argentina) Gustavo Fernández	(United Kingdom) Alfie Hewett (United Kingdom) Gordon Reid	6-1, 2-6, [10–6]
Win	2026	Australian Open	Hard	(Argentina) Gustavo Fernández	(Spain) Daniel Caverzaschi (Netherlands) Ruben Spaargaren	6–2, 6–1
Loss	2026	Wimbledon	Grass	(Argentina) Gustavo Fernández	(United Kingdom) Alfie Hewett (United Kingdom) Gordon Reid	6–2, 1–6, 2–6
