= Daniel Caverzaschi =

Spanish wheelchair tennis player

- Full name: Daniel Javier Caverzaschi Arzola
- Country (sports): Spain
- Born: 11 July 1993 (age 33) Madrid, Spain
- Coach: Ana Salas

Grand Slam singles results
- Australian Open: 1R (2025, 2026)
- French Open: QF (2025)
- Wimbledon: QF (2024)
- US Open: 1R (2022, 2025)

Grand Slam doubles results
- Australian Open: F (2025, 2026)
- French Open: SF (2025)
- Wimbledon: SF (2024, 2025)
- US Open: SF (2025)

Other doubles tournaments
- Paralympic Games: Bronze medal (2024)
Medal record
Paralympic Games
Bronze medal – third place	2024 Paris	Doubles

Daniel Javier Caverzaschi Arzola (born 11 July 1993) is a Spanish wheelchair tennis player. He has represented Spain in 2012, 2016, 2020 and 2024 Summer Paralympics. He won a bronze medal at the 2024 Summer Paralympics in the Men's doubles event.

== Personal ==
Caverzaschi was born on 11 July 1993 in Madrid,Spain, missing most of his right leg from the knee down. His family lived in Spain until he was two years old. They moved to United States due to his father's job, for the next eight years. He spent most of his childhood in Miami, except for a year in Chicago.

Caverzaschi has graduated in economics at the University of Warwick, Coventry, England. There he trained under coach Matt Thomas. At now, he trains at CAR Sant Cugat del Vallés, (Barcelona); and Ciudad de la Raqueta (Madrid).

He is sponsored by Vodafone, Madrid Tennis Federation, and Runnymede College, his "old school in Madrid", which provides him financial support. His goal outside of sport is to become a banker.

== Wheelchair tennis ==
Caverzaschi is a left-handed wheelchair tennis player. He started the sport when he was 12 years old. His highest ever boys' singles rating was second, which he held in October 2011. His best ever men's singles rating was 43, which he held in August 2012. The 2007 Spanish Open was the first major tournament he competed in and reached to the quarter-finals of singles and the finals in the doubles. In 2008, he was described as a rising start in Spanish wheelchair tennis.

Caverzaschi did not compete in any ITF events in 2008, returning to ITF competition in June 2009 where he competed in the Open Internacional Ergosaude, where he made the quarter-finals in the singles and doubles events. The next month, he competed in the boys' wheelchair tennis event at the British Open, where he made the semifinals. He also competed in the 2009 Invacare World Team Cup — Juniors Event, Cruyff Foundation Junior Camp (Spain), Open Internacional Caja Duero and Nottingham Indoor Tournament. In 2010, he competed at the Cruyff Foundation Junior Masters, Invacare World Team Cup — Junior Event, Trofeo Della Mole, British Open, Memorial Oliver Puras — Caja de Burgos and Flanders Open. He made the finals of the boys' competition of the 2010 Trofeo Della Mole. In the men's category, he also made the final but had to abandon the game due to injury. He was seeded number one in the event. He won the Master Nacional de Tenis en Silla de Ruedas Valencia Open 500 in 2010.

In 2011, Caverzaschi competed in the Alpi Del Mare, South African Open, World Team Cup — Junior Event, Open Memorial Santi Silvas, Lleida Open, Wroclaw Cup, La Rioja International Open, Memorial Oliver Puras — Caja de Burgos, Ath Open, Trofeo Della Mole, International Open Villa de Getafe, Izmir Open, Bulgarian Open, and Esporta Cardiff. He beat Shelby Baron 6–2, 6–2 before partnering with Roberto Chamizo to beat the United States; Ryan Nelson and Baron 6–0, 6–3 in the juniors competition of the South African hosted 2011 International Tennis Federation (ITF) Wheelchair Tennis World Team Cup. His first-place finish at the Rioja International Open was the first of his career. At the 2011 Trofeo Della Mole, he defeated Francesc Tur f 3–6, 6–3 and 10–4.

In 2011, Caverzaschi obtained a five-year sponsorship deal with Vodafone as part of the phone company's attempt to sponsor developing athletes to enable them become elites in their sports.

In 2012, Caverzaschi participated in the North West Challenge, Biel-Bienne Indoors, Open International Tennis Handisport, Northern Counties Wheelchair Tournament, Minas Open, Argentina Open, Open International Fundacion Emilio Sanchez Vicario Barcelona, Open International Fundacion Emilio Sanchez Vicario Madrid, Open Internacional Ciudad de A Coruña, International Open Villa de Pinto, Lleida Open, La Rioja International Open, Belgian Open, and Ath Open. He won the Valencia Open 500 in 2012. In Argentina, he reached the semifinals but was eliminated. His final event of the year was the 2012 Summer Paralympics in London, where he went out in the round of 32 for the singles and the round of 16 for the doubles.

In October 2013, he was the number one-ranked wheelchair tennis player in Spain, and twentieth in the world. In October 2013, he competed in the Master Nacional de Tenis en Silla de Ruedas Valencia Open 500.

During the 2020 Tokyo Paralympics, he became the first Spanish paralympic tennis player to reach the quarterfinals. At the 2024 Summer Paralympics, he reached the doubles semifinals for the first time for the Spanish tennis paralympic team along with fellow partner Martín de la Puente. They won Spain's ever first medal in wheelchair tennis after obtaining a bronze medal in the men's doubles event.
