= Donald Ramphadi =

South African wheelchair tennis player

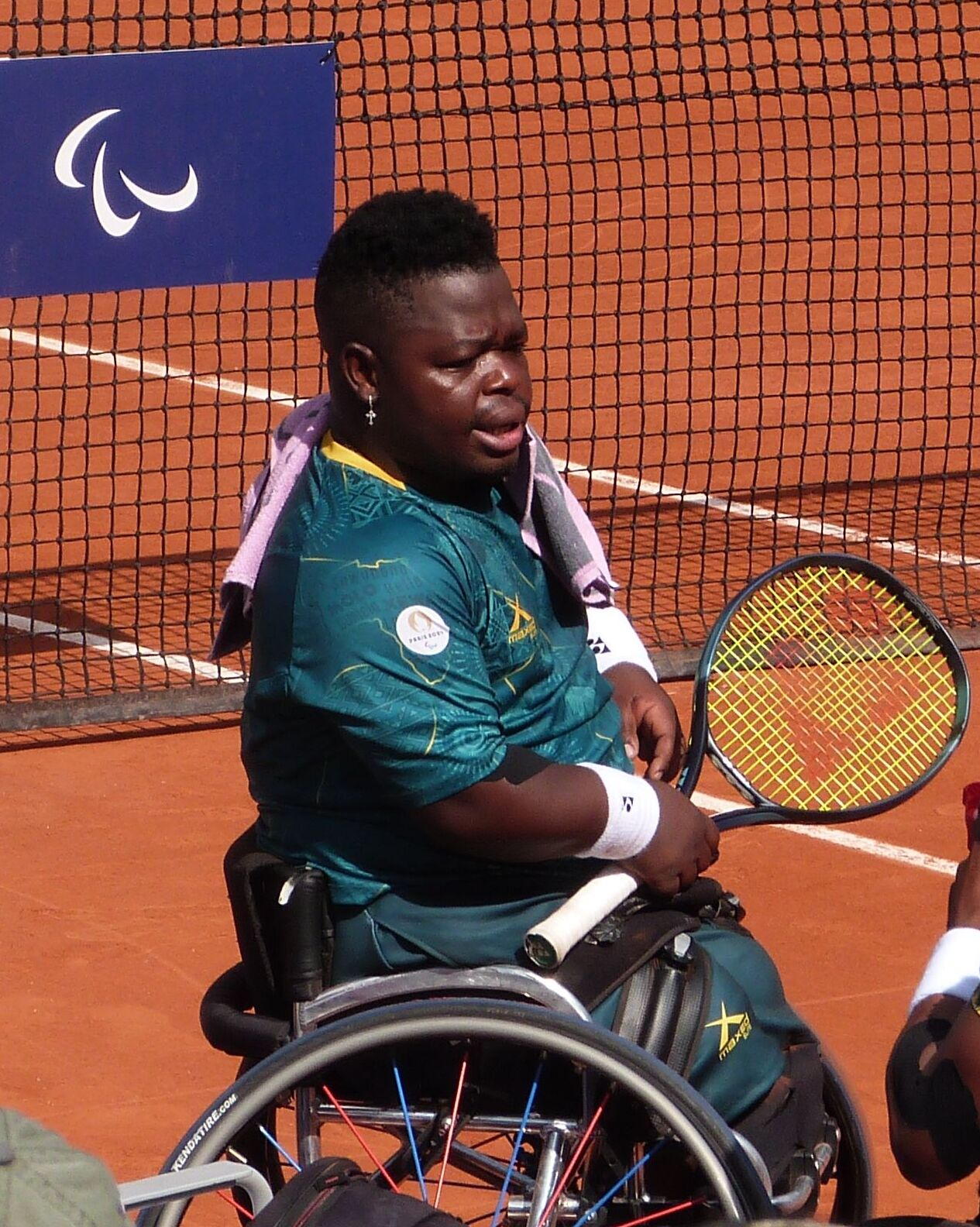
- Ramphadi in 2024
- Country (sports): South Africa
- Residence: Pretoria, South Africa
- Born: 10 June 1993 (age 33) Mogapeng, South Africa
- College: University of South Africa

Singles
- Career record: 160–100
- Highest ranking: No. 3 (17 July 2023)
- Current ranking: No. 6 (26 August 2024)

Grand Slam singles results
- Australian Open: SF (2023, 2024)
- French Open: SF (2024)
- Wimbledon: SF (2023)
- US Open: SF (2022)

Other tournaments
- Paralympic Games: R16 (2024)

Doubles
- Career record: 96–85
- Highest ranking: No. 3 (22 January 2024)
- Current ranking: No. 8 (26 August 2024)

Grand Slam doubles results
- Australian Open: F (2023, 2024)
- French Open: W (2023)
- Wimbledon: F (2025)
- US Open: F (2023)

Other doubles tournaments
- Paralympic Games: SF (2024)
Medal record
Men's wheelchair tennis
Representing South Africa
Paralympic Games
Bronze medal – third place	2024 Paris	Quad doubles

Donald Ramphadi (born 10 June 1993), nicknamed Dona, is a South African wheelchair tennis player who plays in the sport's quad division. Ramphadi, alongside partner Andy Lapthorne, is the 2023 French Open quad wheelchair doubles champion. Ramphadi has also been the runner-up in numerous quad wheelchair doubles grand slam events, with frequent partners including Lapthorne, Lucas Sithole, and Koji Sugeno. Ramphadi and Sithole won bronze in the quad doubles wheelchair tennis event at the Paris 2024 Paralympic Games, which was the African continent's first-ever wheelchair tennis medal.

== Tennis career ==
Ramphadi first started playing tennis in 2009 while studying at Letaba Special School in Tzaneen, Limpopo Province, and originally thought tennis was "a white people's sport," but ended up falling in love with the game. He was cleared to compete in the quad division of wheelchair tennis in 2018.

Ramphadi has participated in several Grand Slams' quad wheelchair divisions in both singles and doubles. Ramphadi and his partner Andy Lapthorne claimed the 2023 French Open quad wheelchair doubles title at Roland-Garros, winning the final match on Ramphadi's birthday while he played in a secondhand wheelchair.

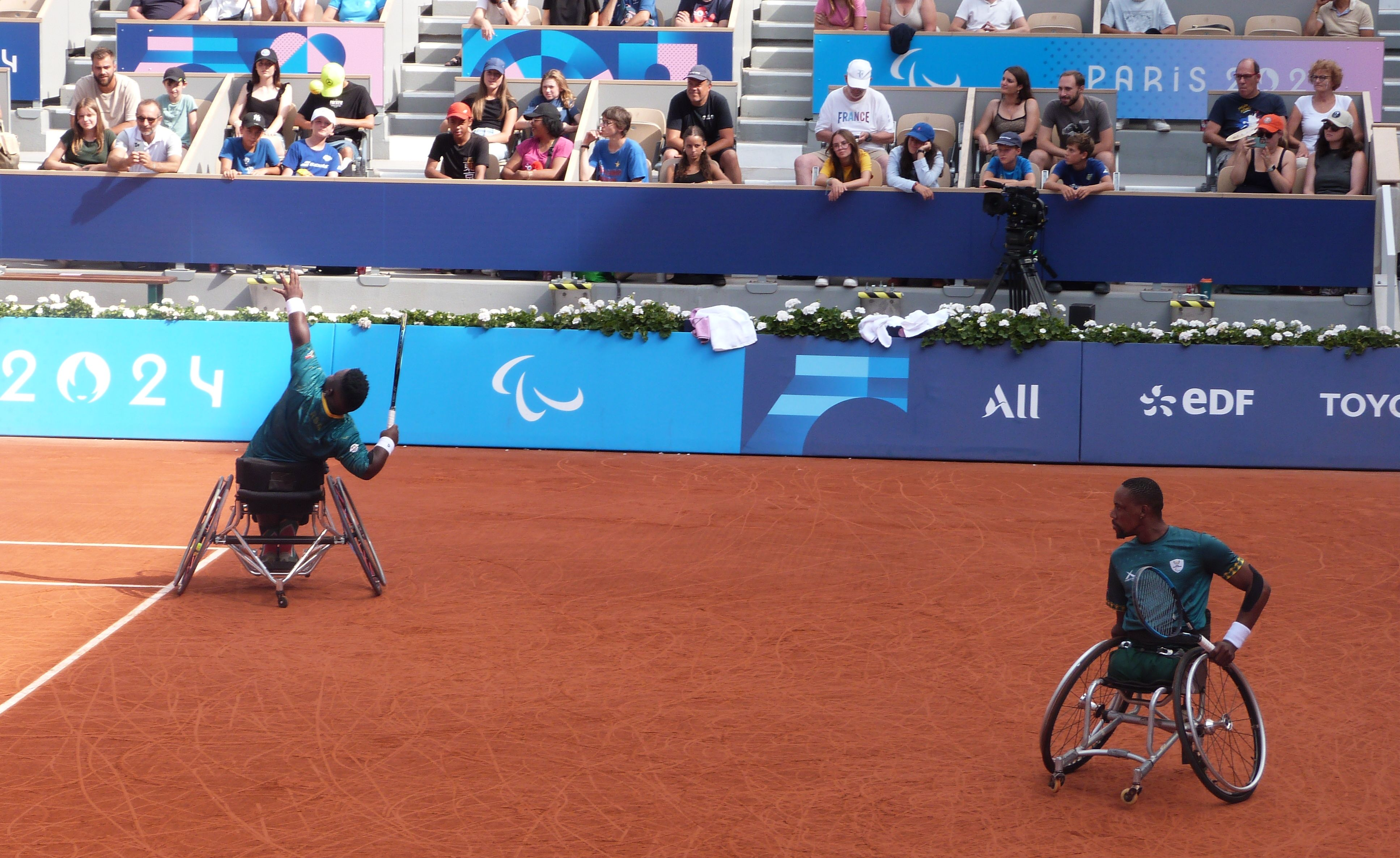
Ramphadi (left) and Lucas Sithole in their semifinal match at the Paris 2024 Paralympic Games

Ramphadi and partner Lucas Sithole made it to the semifinals of the 2024 Paralympics' quad doubles wheelchair tennis event, losing to 2020 gold medalists Sam Schröder and Niels Vink. Ramphadi and Sithole then defeated the Brazilian pair of Ymanitu Silva (one of Ramphadi's previous partners) and Leandro Pena to win the event's bronze medal, which was South Africa's fourth medal of the 2024 Games and the first-ever wheelchair tennis medal won by an African country.

Ramphadi has noted his desire to encourage more young Black South Africans to pick up tennis, saying, "Now that I am a grand slam champion, just to change the way that young kids are thinking at home is the aim."

== Personal life ==
Ramphadi was born in Mogapeng, a village in the Greater Tzaneen Local Municipality of Limpopo Province, South Africa. He was fully able-bodied until the age of 12, when he developed osteogenesis imperfecta (OI), also known as brittle bone disease. His mobility decreased until he could almost not walk, though it began to partly increase after his mother suggested he begin walking with a cane she had collected in a local forest. Ramphadi attended the University of South Africa. He now lives in Pretoria and is a father to one son.

== See also ==
- List of quad wheelchair tennis champions
