= Wheelchair tennis at the 2016 Summer Paralympics – Men's singles =

Wheelchair tennis – Men's singles at the XV Paralympic Games
- Paralympic wheelchair tennis
- Venue: Olympic Tennis Centre
- Date: 9–16 September
- Competitors: 52

Medalists
1st place, gold medalist(s)		Gordon Reid	Great Britain
2nd place, silver medalist(s)		Alfie Hewett	Great Britain
3rd place, bronze medalist(s)		Joachim Gérard	Belgium

Men's singles
- Wheelchair tennis at the 2016 Summer Paralympics

Events
Singles	men	women	quad
Doubles	men	women	quad
← 2012 ·	Summer Paralympics	· 2020 →

The men's singles wheelchair tennis tournament at the 2016 Paralympic Games in Rio de Janeiro was held at the Olympic Tennis Centre in the Barra Olympic Park in Barra da Tijuca in the west zone of Rio de Janeiro, Brazil from 9 to 16 September 2016.

Great Britain's Gordon Reid defeated compatriot Alfie Hewett in the final, 6–2, 6–1 to win the gold medal in men's singles wheelchair tennis at the 2016 Rio Paralympics. With the win, Reid became the singles world No. 1. In the bronze-medal match, Belgium's Joachim Gérard defeated France's Stéphane Houdet.

Japan's Shingo Kunieda was the two-time defending gold medalist, but was defeated by Gérard in the quarterfinals.

== Seeds ==
1. Stéphane Houdet (FRA) (semifinals, fourth place)
2. Joachim Gerard (BEL) (semifinals, bronze medalist)
3. Gordon Reid (GBR) (champion, gold medalist)
4. Nicolas Peifer (FRA) (third round)
5. Gustavo Fernández (ARG) (quarterfinals)
6. Shingo Kunieda (JPN) (quarterfinals)
7. Stefan Olsson (SWE) (quarterfinals)
8. Maikel Scheffers (NED) (third round)

9. Takashi Sanada (JPN) (third round)
10. Takayu Miki (JPN) (quarterfinals)
11. Tom Egberink (NED) (second round)
12. Adam Kellerman (AUS) (third round)
13. Alfie Hewett (GBR) (final, silver medalist)
14. Frédéric Cattanéo (FRA) (third round)
15. Daniel Caverzaschi (ESP) (third round)
16. Michaël Jérémiasz (FRA) (third round)

Click on the seed number of a player to go to their draw section.

== Draw ==
=== Key ===
- Q = Qualifier
- WC = Wild card
- LL = Lucky loser
- Alt = Alternate
- ITF = ITF entry
- PR = Protected ranking
- SR = Special ranking
- SE = Special exempt
- JE = Junior exempt
- JR = Junior Accelerator Programme entrant
- CO = College Accelerator Programme entrant
- NG = Next Gen Accelerator Program entrant
- w/o = Walkover
- r = Retired
- d = Defaulted
- BPC = Bipartite Invitation

=== Finals ===
Quarterfinals
1	Stéphane Houdet (FRA)	6	6
10	Takayu Miki (JPN)	4	2
3	Gordon Reid (GBR)	2	7^{7}	6
5	Gustavo Fernández (ARG)	6	6^{4}	1
7	Stefan Olsson (SWE)	1	6	3
13	Alfie Hewett (GBR)	6	2	6
6	Shingo Kunieda (JPN)	3	3
2	Joachim Gerard (BEL)	6	6

Semifinals
1	Stéphane Houdet (FRA)	5	2
3	Gordon Reid (GBR)	7	6
13	Alfie Hewett (GBR)	7	6
2	Joachim Gerard (BEL)	5	3

Final (gold-medal match)
3	Gordon Reid (GBR)	6	6
13	Alfie Hewett (GBR)	2	1
Bronze-medal match
1	Stéphane Houdet (FRA)	4	2
2	Joachim Gerard (BEL)	6	6

=== Top half ===
==== Section 1 ====
First round
BPC	P Bedard (CAN)	0	1
D Phillipson (GBR)	6	6
BPC	S Baldwin (USA)	6	4	6
R Medeiros (BRA)	2	6	3
Z Wei (CHN)	2	6	3
15	D Caverzaschi (ESP)	6	1	6
E Maripa (RSA)	7	6
BPC	S Khlongrua (THA)	5	0
A Ledesma (ARG)	2	2
T Kruszelnicki (POL)	6	6

Second round
1	S Houdet (FRA)	6	6
D Phillipson (GBR)	1	2
BPC	S Baldwin (USA)	0	3
15	D Caverzaschi (ESP)	6	6
10	T Miki (JPN)	7^{7}	7
E Maripa (RSA)	6^{1}	5
T Kruszelnicki (POL)	2	0
8	M Scheffers (NED)	6	6

Third round
1	S Houdet (FRA)	6	6
15	D Caverzaschi (ESP)	0	1
10	T Miki (JPN)	4	7	6
8	M Scheffers (NED)	6	5	4

Quarterfinals
1	S Houdet (FRA)	6	6
10	T Miki (JPN)	4	2

==== Section 2 ====
First round
M Denayer (BEL)	2	2
D Wallin (SWE)	6	6
M Legner (AUT)	1	3
BPC	HW Im (KOR)	6	6
BPC	E Oquendo (COL)	0	2
14	F Cattanéo (FRA)	6	6
S Saida (JPN)	6	6
A Berdichevsky (ISR)	1	2
C Santos (BRA)	1	4
M de la Puente (ESP)	6	6

Second round
3	G Reid (GBR)	6	6
D Wallin (SWE)	1	2
BPC	HW Im (KOR)	7	2	6^{4}
14	F Cattanéo (FRA)	5	6	7^{7}
12	A Kellerman (AUS)	7	6
S Saida (JPN)	5	1
M de la Puente (ESP)	2	4
5	G Fernández (ARG)	6	6

Third round
3	G Reid (GBR)	6	6
14	F Cattanéo (FRA)	0	2
12	A Kellerman (AUS)	1	2
5	G Fernández (ARG)	6	6

Quarterfinals
3	G Reid (GBR)	2	7^{7}	6
5	G Fernández (ARG)	6	6^{4}	1

=== Bottom half ===
==== Section 3 ====
First round
F Tur (ESP)	5	3
B Weekes (AUS)	7	6
K Fabisiak (POL)	6	6
M Pommê (BRA)	1	2
13	A Hewett (GBR)	6	6
BPC	AS Borhan (MAS)	0	1
BPC	U Rajakaruna (SRI)	2	7^{7}	6
BPC	HG Lee (KOR)	6	6^{5}	1
E Casco (ARG)	6	3	6^{7}
BPC	J Rydberg (USA)	3	6	7^{9}

Second round
7	S Olsson (SWE)	6	6
B Weekes (AUS)	0	3
K Fabisiak (POL)	0	1
9	T Sanada (JPN)	6	6
13	A Hewett (GBR)	6	6
BPC	U Rajakaruna (SRI)	1	2
BPC	J Rydberg (USA)	2	2
4	N Peifer (FRA)	6	6

Third round
7	S Olsson (SWE)	6	7^{7}
9	T Sanada (JPN)	2	6^{5}
13	A Hewett (GBR)	7^{7}	4	6
4	N Peifer (FRA)	6^{4}	6	3

Quarterfinals
7	S Olsson (SWE)	1	6	3
13	A Hewett (GBR)	6	2	6

==== Section 4 ====
First round
BPC	R Mendez (CHI)	0	4
D Rodrigues (BRA)	6	6
S Dong (CHN)	6	6
N Langmann (AUT)	0	3
16	M Jérémiasz (FRA)	6	6
BPC	S Diamantis (GRE)	0	3
L Els (RSA)	3	3
BPC	R Nemeth (HUN)	6	6
M McCarroll (GBR)	7	6
F Mazzei (ITA)	5	3

Second round
6	S Kunieda (JPN)	6	6
D Rodrigues (BRA)	2	1
S Dong (CHN)	6	6
11	T Egberink (NED)	1	1
16	M Jérémiasz (FRA)	6	6
BPC	R Nemeth (HUN)	1	2
M McCarroll (GBR)	1	4
2	J Gerard (BEL)	6	6

Third round
6	S Kunieda (JPN)	6	6
S Dong (CHN)	1	4
16	M Jérémiasz (FRA)	0	0
2	J Gerard (BEL)	6	6

Quarterfinals
6	Shingo Kunieda (JPN)	3	3
2	J Gerard (BEL)	6	6
