= Wheelchair tennis at the 2016 Summer Paralympics – Men's doubles =

Wheelchair tennis – Men's doubles at the XV Paralympic Games
- Paralympic wheelchair tennis
- Venue: Olympic Tennis Centre
- Dates: 10–15 September 2016
- Competitors: 40 (20 pairs) from 16 nations

Medalists
1st place, gold medalist(s)		Stéphane Houdet; Nicolas Peifer	France
2nd place, silver medalist(s)		Alfie Hewett; Gordon Reid	Great Britain
3rd place, bronze medalist(s)		Shingo Kunieda; Satoshi Saida	Japan

Men's doubles
- Wheelchair tennis at the 2016 Summer Paralympics

Events
Singles	men	women	quad
Doubles	men	women	quad
← 2012 ·	Summer Paralympics	· 2020 →

The men's doubles wheelchair tennis tournament at the 2016 Paralympic Games in Rio de Janeiro was held at the Olympic Tennis Centre in the Barra Olympic Park in Barra da Tijuca in the west zone of Rio de Janeiro, Brazil from 10 to 15 September 2016.

== Draw ==
=== Final rounds ===
Quarterfinals
1	Stéphane Houdet (FRA); Nicolas Peifer (FRA)	6	6
7	Gustavo Fernández (ARG); Agustin Ledesma (ARG)	1	2
4	Takuya Miki (JPN); Takashi Sanada (JPN)	6	3	6
5	Tom Egberink (NED); Maikel Scheffers (NED)	1	6	4
6	Shingo Kunieda (JPN); Satoshi Saida (JPN)	1	6	7
3	Frédéric Cattanéo (FRA); Michaël Jérémiasz (FRA)	6	3	6
Daniel Caverzaschi (ESP); Martin de la Puente (ESP)	2	0
2	Alfie Hewett (GBR); Gordon Reid (GBR)	6	6

Semifinals
1	Stéphane Houdet (FRA); Nicolas Peifer (FRA)	6	7
4	Takuya Miki (JPN); Takashi Sanada (JPN)	2	5
6	Shingo Kunieda (JPN); Satoshi Saida (JPN)	2	4
2	Alfie Hewett (GBR); Gordon Reid (GBR)	6	6

Gold medal match
1	Stéphane Houdet (FRA); Nicolas Peifer (FRA)	6	4	6
2	Alfie Hewett (GBR); Gordon Reid (GBR)	2	6	1
Bronze medal match
4	Takuya Miki (JPN); Takashi Sanada (JPN)	3	4
6	Shingo Kunieda (JPN); Satoshi Saida (JPN)	6	6

=== Section 1 ===
First round			Second round			Quarterfinal
			Stéphane Houdet (FRA); Nicolas Peifer (FRA)	6	6
Wei Zujun (CHN); Dong Sunjiang (CHN)	4	6	Marc McCarroll (GBR); David Phillipson (GBR)	0	2
Marc McCarroll (GBR); David Phillipson (GBR)	6	7				Stéphane Houdet (FRA); Nicolas Peifer (FRA)	6	6
						Gustavo Fernández (ARG); Agustin Ledesma (ARG)	1	2
			Leon Els (RSA); Evans Maripa (RSA)	5	2
			Gustavo Fernández (ARG); Agustin Ledesma (ARG)	7	6

=== Section 2 ===
First round				Second round			Quarterfinal
				Takuya Miki (JPN); Takashi Sanaka (JPN)	6	6
Adam Kellerman (AUS); Ben Weekes (AUS)	5	6	3	Kamil Fabisiak (POL); Tadeusz Kruszelnicki (POL)	2	2
Kamil Fabisiak (POL); Tadeusz Kruszelnicki (POL)	7	3	6				Takuya Miki (JPN); Takashi Sanaka (JPN)	6	3	6
							Tom Egberink (NED); Mikail Scheffers (NED)	1	6	4
				Tom Egberink (NED); Mikail Scheffers (NED)	6	6
				Rafael Medeiros (BRA); Daniel Rodrigues (BRA)	2	3

=== Section 3 ===
First round
Steve Baldwin (USA); Jon Rydberg (USA)	3	2
Dan Wallin (SWE); Stefan Olsson (SWE)	6	6

Second round
Shingo Kunieda (JPN); Satoshi Saida (JPN)	6	6
Nico Langmann (AUS); Martin Ledner (AUS)	2	0
Frédéric Cattanéo (FRA); Michaël Jérémiasz (FRA)	6	6
Dan Wallin (SWE); Stefan Olsson (SWE)	3	1

Quarterfinal
Shingo Kunieda (JPN); Satoshi Saida (JPN)	1	6	7
Frédéric Cattanéo (FRA); Michaël Jérémiasz (FRA)	6	3	6

=== Section 4 ===
First round			Second round				Quarterfinal
			Mike Denayer (BEL); Joachim Gerard (BEL)	5	7	2
			Daniel Caverzaschi (ESP); Martin de la Puente (ESP)	7	6	6
							Daniel Caverzaschi (ESP); Martin de la Puente (ESP)	2	0
Im Ho Won (KOR); Lee Ha Gel (KOR)	6	6					Alfie Hewett (GBR); Gordon Reid (GBR)	6	6
Maurício Pommê (BRA); Carlos Santos (BRA)	2	2	Im Ho Won (KOR); Lee Ha Gel (KOR)	1	2
			Alfie Hewett (GBR); Gordon Reid (GBR)	6	6
