= Wheelchair tennis at the 2016 Summer Paralympics – Women's singles =

Wheelchair tennis – Women's singles at the XV Paralympic Games
- Paralympic wheelchair tennis
- Venue: Olympic Tennis Centre
- Date: 10–15 September
- Competitors: 32

Medalists
1st place, gold medalist(s)		Jiske Griffioen	Netherlands
2nd place, silver medalist(s)		Aniek van Koot	Netherlands
3rd place, bronze medalist(s)		Yui Kamiji	Japan

Women's singles
- Wheelchair tennis at the 2016 Summer Paralympics

Events
Singles	men	women	quad
Doubles	men	women	quad
← 2012 ·	Summer Paralympics	· 2020 →

The women's singles wheelchair tennis tournament at the 2016 Paralympic Games in Rio de Janeiro was held at the Olympic Tennis Centre in the Barra Olympic Park in Barra da Tijuca in the west zone of Rio de Janeiro, Brazil from 10 to 15 September 2016.

Netherlands' domination of women's singles in wheelchair tennis was extended to a seventh successive Games, as Jiske Griffioen became the fifth different Dutch winner of the event, following the retirement of four-time winner Esther Vergeer following one of the longest unbeaten runs in sport. Indeed, the final was an all-Dutch affair, with the silver going to Aniek van Koot. Japanese player Yui Kamiji managed to prevent an all-Dutch podium, winning in the bronze medal playoff against the Netherlands' Diede de Groot.

== Final rounds ==
Quarterfinals
1	Jiske Griffioen (NED)	6	6
Huang Huimin (CHN)	0	0
3	Jordanne Whiley (GBR)	3	1
6	Diede de Groot (NED)	6	6
Zhu Zhenzhen (CHN)	1	7	1
4	Aniek van Koot (NED)	6	5	6
5	Marjolein Buis (NED)	2	0
2	Yui Kamiji (JPN)	6	6

Semifinals
1	Jiske Griffioen (NED)	4	6	7
6	Diede de Groot (NED)	6	4	6
4	Aniek van Koot (NED)	6	4	7
2	Yui Kamiji (JPN)	3	6	5

Gold medal match
4	Aniek van Koot (NED)	6	1	4
1	Jiske Griffioen (NED)	3	6	6
Bronze medal match
2	Yui Kamiji (JPN)	6	6
6	Diede de Groot (NED)	3	3

== Preliminary rounds ==
=== Section 1 ===
First round
1	Jiske Griffioen (NED)	6	6
Kaitlyn Verfuerth (USA)	1	1
Lucy Shuker (GBR)	6	6
Francisca Mardones (CHI)	2	0
Huang Huimin (CHN)	6	6
Emmanuelle Mörch (FRA)	2	0
Lola Ochoa (ESP)	1	1
7	Katharina Krüger (GER)	6	6

Second round
1	Jiske Griffioen (NED)	6	6
Lucy Shuker (GBR)	4	1
Huang Huimin (CHN)	6	6
7	Katharina Krüger (GER)	0	3

Quarterfinal
1	Jiske Griffioen (NED)	6	6
Huang Huimin (CHN)	0	0

=== Section 2 ===
First round
3	Jordanne Whiley (GBR)	6	6
Park Ju Youn (KOR)	1	2
Busra Un (TUR)	1	0
Natália Mayara (BRA)	6	6
Marianna Lauro (ITA)	1	4
Shelby Baron (USA)	6	6
Kanako Domori (JPN)	1	3
6	Diede de Groot (NED)	6	6

Second round
3	Jordanne Whiley (GBR)	6	6
Natália Mayara (BRA)	4	1
Shelby Baron (USA)	4	1
6	Diede de Groot (NED)	6	6

Quarterfinal
3	Jordanne Whiley (GBR)	3	1
6	Diede de Groot (NED)	6	6

=== Section 3 ===
First round
8	Kgothatso Montjane (RSA)	6	6
Miho Nijo (JPN)	2	1
Sarah Calati (AUS)	0	1
Zhu Zhenzhen (CHN)	6	6
Louise Hunt (GBR)	1	4
Dana Mathewson (USA)	6	6
Sakhorn Khanthasit (THA)	2	3
4	Aniek van Koot (NED)	6	6

Second round
8	Kgothatso Montjane (RSA)	4	6	5
Zhu Zhenzhen (CHN)	6	4	7
Dana Mathewson (USA)	3	1
4	Aniek van Koot (NED)	6	6

Quarterfinal
Zhu Zhenzhen (CHN)	1	7	1
4	Aniek van Koot (NED)	6	5	6

=== Section 4 ===
First round
5	Marjolein Buis (NED)	7	6
Angélica Bernal (COL)	6	1
Charlotte Famin (FRA)	2	6	6
Emmy Kaiser (USA)	6	4	1
Macarena Cabrillana (CHI)	6	6
Lu Chia-Ye (TPE)	4	3
Rejane Cândida (BRA)	0	0
2	Yui Kamiji (JPN)	6	6

Second round
5	Marjolein Buis (NED)	6	7
Charlotte Famin (FRA)	2	5
Macarena Cabrillana (CHI)	1	1
2	Yui Kamiji (JPN)	6	6

Quarterfinal
5	Marjolein Buis (NED)	2	0
2	Yui Kamiji (JPN)	6	6
