= Wheelchair tennis at the 2016 Summer Paralympics =

- Date: 9–16 September 2016
- Edition: 8th
- Category: Super Series
- Location: Olympic Tennis Centre

Champions

Men's singles
- Gordon Reid (GBR)

Women's singles
- Jiske Griffioen (NED)

Men's doubles
- Stéphane Houdet (FRA) / Nicolas Peifer (FRA)

Women's doubles
- Jiske Griffioen (NED) / Aniek van Koot (NED)

Quad singles
- Dylan Alcott (AUS)

Quad doubles
- Dylan Alcott (AUS) / Heath Davidson (AUS)
- Summer Paralympics

Wheelchair tennis events at the 2016 Summer Paralympics were held between 8 and 16 September at Olympic Tennis Centre, Rio. This was the seventh full Paralympic wheelchair tennis competition since the event was introduced in 1992, having been a demonstration event in 1988.

== Classification ==
Players were classified according to the type and extent of their disability, and within that system according to gender.

The classification system allows players to compete against others with a similar level of function. All wheelchair tennis athletes must have a major or total loss of function in one or both legs to take part in the sport. further to that, there are two broad categorisations within wheelchair tennis; paraplegic players, with full arm function who play in gendered events, and quadriplegic ("quad tennis") players with restrictions in arm function, where no gender division occurs.

== Qualification ==
A national paralympic committee (NPC) can enter a maximum of four qualified male athletes and four qualified female athletes in the men's and women's singles events, respectively and a maximum of three qualified athletes in the quad singles.

An NPC can enter a maximum of two qualified men's teams and two qualified women's teams, each containing two athletes, in the men's and women's doubles events, respectively, and a maximum of one qualified team of two athletes in the quad doubles – (mixed gender)

An NPC can be allocated a maximum of four male and four female qualification slots for athletes competing in the men's and women's events, and no more than three qualification slots in the quad sport class for a maximum quota allocation of eleven qualification slots per NPC. As such, doubles pairings in the larger teams must be made from the qualified singles players of that team.

The majority of the qualifiers will be chosen by rankings on 23 May 2016. A smaller number will be chosen by the Bipartite Commission, while the host country will also be allocated quota places. A small number of direct qualifiers will also be allocated places from continental games.

Qualifiers for the Paralympic Games 2016 – wheelchair tennis
Qualification method	Men	Women	Quad	Totals
ITF wheelchair tennis Regional games Direct allocation	2014 Asian Para Games Incheon, South Korea		—N/a	2
ITF wheelchair tennis Regional games Direct allocation	Japan	Thailand	—N/a	2
ITF wheelchair tennis Regional games Direct allocation	2015 Parapan American Games Toronto, Canada		—N/a	2
ITF wheelchair tennis Regional games Direct allocation	Argentina	Brazil	—N/a	2
ITF wheelchair tennis singles rankings 23 May 2016	France (4); Great Britain (4); Japan (3); Argentina (2); Brazil (3); Spain (3); Australia; Austria; Netherlands; Poland; South Africa; Belgium; China; Israel; Italy; Sweden	Netherlands (4); Great Britain (3); Japan (3); Brazil (2); Germany (2); United States (2); Chile; China; France; Italy; ~~Russia~~; South Africa; South Korea; Thailand; Chinese Taipei	Great Britain (3); Israel (2); Japan (2); United States (2); Italy; Australia; South Africa	68
Bipartite Commission	Canada; Chile; Colombia; Greece; Hungary; South Korea (2); Malaysia; Sri Lanka; Thailand; United States(2)	Brazil; Chile; China; Colombia; France; Spain; Turkey; United States	Australia; Brazil (2); United States	24
ITF wheelchair tennis doubles rankings 23 May 2016	Belgium; Brazil; China; Sweden	—N/a	—N/a	8

== Competition schedule ==
Competition lasts from 9 to 16 September.

OC	Opening ceremony	Competition	●	Event finals	CC	Closing ceremony

September 2016	7 Wed	8 Thu	9 Fri	10 Sat	11 Sun	12 Mon	13 Tue	14 Wed	15 Thu	16 Fri	17 Sat	18 Sun	Gold medals
Wheelchair Tennis	OC						●	●	● ●	● ●		CC	6

== Medal table ==
Rank	Nation	Gold	Silver	Bronze	Total
1	Netherlands (NED)	2	2	0	4
2	Australia (AUS)	2	0	0	2
3	Great Britain (GBR)	1	3	2	6
4	France (FRA)	1	0	0	1
5	United States (USA)	0	1	1	2
6	Japan (JPN)	0	0	2	2
7	Belgium (BEL)	0	0	1	1
Totals (7 entries)		6	6	6	18

== Medalists ==
Event	Gold	Silver	Bronze
Men's singles	Gordon Reid; Great Britain	Alfie Hewett; Great Britain	Joachim Gérard; Belgium
Men's doubles	France; Stéphane Houdet; Nicolas Peifer	Great Britain; Alfie Hewett; Gordon Reid	Japan; Shingo Kunieda; Satoshi Saida
Women's singles	Jiske Griffioen; Netherlands	Aniek van Koot; Netherlands	Yui Kamiji; Japan
Women's doubles	Netherlands; Jiske Griffioen; Aniek van Koot	Netherlands; Marjolein Buis; Diede de Groot	Great Britain; Lucy Shuker; Jordanne Whiley
Quad singles	Dylan Alcott; Australia	Andrew Lapthorne; Great Britain	David Wagner; United States
Quad doubles	Australia; Dylan Alcott; Heath Davidson	United States; Nicholas Taylor; David Wagner	Great Britain; Jamie Burdekin; Andrew Lapthorne
