= Wheelchair tennis at the 2016 Summer Paralympics – Women's doubles =

Wheelchair tennis – Women's doubles at the XV Paralympic Games
- Paralympic wheelchair tennis
- Venue: Olympic Tennis Centre
- Dates: 9–16 September 2016
- Competitors: 20 (10 pairs) from 8 nations

Medalists
1st place, gold medalist(s)		Jiske Griffioen (NED); Aniek van Koot (NED)
2nd place, silver medalist(s)		Marjolein Buis (NED); Diede De Groot (NED)
3rd place, bronze medalist(s)		Lucy Shuker (GBR); Jordanne Whiley (GBR)

Women's doubles
- Wheelchair tennis at the 2016 Summer Paralympics

Events
Singles	men	women	quad
Doubles	men	women	quad
← 2012 ·	Summer Paralympics	· 2020 →

The women's doubles wheelchair tennis tournament at the 2016 Paralympic Games in Rio de Janeiro was held at the Olympic Tennis Centre in the Barra Olympic Park in Barra da Tijuca in the west zone of Rio de Janeiro, Brazil from 9 to 16 September 2016.

== Draw ==
=== Preliminaries ===
The women's doubles consisted of ten pairings. In the first round, four of these pairings played off for the final two places in the quarterfinals. The other six pairings received byes to the last eight.

Preliminary match 1 (Note: Winner of match 1 faces Griffioen/van Koot (1) in quarter final)
Shelby Baron (USA); Emmy Kaiser (USA)	6	7	6
Charlotte Famin (FRA); Emmanuelle Mörch (FRA)	7	5	4

Preliminary match 2 (Note: Winner of match 2 faces Buis/de Groot (2) in quarter final)
Dana Mathewson (USA); Kaitlyn Verfuerth (USA)	6	6
Rejane Cândida (BRA); Natália Mayara (BRA)	2	4

=== Final rounds ===
Quarterfinals
1	Jiske Griffioen (NED); Aniek van Koot (NED)	6	6
Shelby Baron (USA); Emmy Kaiser (USA)	2	1
top half
3	Lucy Shuker (GBR); Jordanne Whiley (GBR)	6	6
Macarena Cabrillana (CHI); Francisca Mardones (CHI)	0	0
Huang Huimin (CHN); Zhu Zhenzhen (CHN)	3	0
4	Yui Kamiji (JPN); Miho Nijo (JPN)	6	6
bottom half
Dana Mathewson (USA); Kaitlyn Verfuerth (USA)	2	4
2	Marjolein Buis (NED); Diede De Groot (NED)	6	6

Semifinals
1	Jiske Griffioen (NED); Aniek van Koot (NED)	6	6
3	Lucy Shuker (GBR); Jordanne Whiley (GBR)	3	3
4	Yui Kamiji (JPN); Miho Nijo (JPN)	4	7	5
2	Marjolein Buis (NED); Diede De Groot (NED)	6	5	7

Gold medal match
1	Jiske Griffioen (NED); Aniek van Koot (NED)	6	6
2	Marjolein Buis (NED); Diede De Groot (NED)	4	2
Bronze medal match
3	Lucy Shuker (GBR); Jordanne Whiley (GBR)	6	0	6
4	Yui Kamiji (JPN); Miho Nijo (JPN)	3	6	1
