= Wheelchair tennis at the 2016 Summer Paralympics – Quad singles =

Wheelchair tennis – Quad singles at the XV Paralympic Games
- Paralympic wheelchair tennis
- Venue: Olympic Tennis Centre
- Date: 9–14 September
- Competitors: 16 from 8 nations

Medalists
1st place, gold medalist(s)		Dylan Alcott	Australia
2nd place, silver medalist(s)		Andy Lapthorne	Great Britain
3rd place, bronze medalist(s)		David Wagner	United States

Quad singles
- Wheelchair tennis at the 2016 Summer Paralympics

Events
Singles	men	women	quad
Doubles	men	women	quad
← 2012 ·	Summer Paralympics	· 2020 →

The quad singles wheelchair tennis tournament at the 2016 Paralympic Games in Rio de Janeiro was held at the Olympic Tennis Centre in the Barra Olympic Park in Barra da Tijuca in the west zone of Rio de Janeiro, Brazil from 9 to 13 September 2016.

== Seeds ==
1. Dylan Alcott (AUS) (champion, gold medalist)
2. David Wagner (USA) (semifinals, bronze medalist)
3. Lucas Sithole (RSA) (semifinals, fourth place)
4. Andy Lapthorne (GBR) (final, silver medalist)

=== Bracket ===
Round of 16
1	Dylan Alcott (AUS)	6	6
Shraga Weinberg (ISR)	0	0
Antony Cotterill (GBR)	3	6^{5}
Nick Taylor (USA)	6	7^{7}
3	Lucas Sithole (RSA)	6	6
Shota Kawano (JPN)	1	2
Jamie Burdekin (GBR)	2	6	1
Ymanitu Silva (BRA)	6	2	6
Heath Davidson (AUS)	2	7	6
Bryan Barten (USA)	6	5	1
Alberto Corradi (ITA)	2	3
4	Andy Lapthorne (GBR)	6	6
Mitsuteru Moroishi (JPN)	6	6
Rodrigo Oliveira (BRA)	1	0
Itai Erenlib (ISR)	4	4
2	David Wagner (USA)	6	6

Quarterfinals
1	Dylan Alcott (AUS)	6	6
Nick Taylor (USA)	2	0
3	Lucas Sithole (RSA)	7	6
Ymanitu Silva (BRA)	5	3
Heath Davidson (AUS)	1	2
4	Andy Lapthorne (GBR)	6	6
Mitsuteru Moroishi (JPN)	2	2
2	David Wagner (USA)	6	6

Semifinals
1	Dylan Alcott (AUS)	6	6
3	Lucas Sithole (RSA)	0	3
4	Andy Lapthorne (GBR)	6	2	6
2	David Wagner (USA)	3	6	3

Final (gold-medal match)
1	Dylan Alcott (AUS)	6	6
4	Andy Lapthorne (GBR)	3	4
Bronze-medal match
3	Lucas Sithole (RSA)	6	2	5
2	David Wagner (USA)	1	6	7
