= Selepe =

Selepe is a surname. Notable people with the surname include:

- Lehlohonolo Selepe, South African politician
- Patrick Selepe, South African wheelchair tennis player

== See also ==
- Sleep
- Slepe
