= Wheelchair tennis at the 2020 Summer Paralympics =

- Date: 27 August – 4 September 2021
- Edition: 9th
- Category: Super Series
- Location: Ariake Tennis Park

Champions

Men's singles
- Shingo Kunieda (JPN)

Women's singles
- Diede de Groot (NED)

Men's doubles
- Stéphane Houdet (FRA) / Nicolas Peifer (FRA)

Women's doubles
- Diede de Groot (NED) / Aniek van Koot (NED)

Quad singles
- Dylan Alcott (AUS)

Quad doubles
- Sam Schröder (NED) / Niels Vink (NED)
- Summer Paralympics

Wheelchair tennis at the 2020 Summer Paralympics in Tokyo, Japan took place at the Ariake Tennis Park from 27 August to 4 September 2021.

The 2020 Summer Olympic and Paralympic Games were postponed to 2021 due to the COVID-19 pandemic. They kept the 2020 name and were held from 24 August to 5 September 2021.

Patrick Selepe became the first disabled umpire to officiate in a wheelchair Paralympic event.

== Qualification ==
- There are 56 male (singles and doubles), 32 female (singles and doubles) and 16 quad (singles and doubles).
- The qualification slots are awarded to the individual athletes, not to the NPCs and they should not exceed the maximum total quota allocation of 11 qualification slots.
  - A maximum of eight qualification slots (4 male, 4 female) can be allocated to men's and women's singles events respectively.
  - A maximum of three in the quads' class.
  - A maximum of two men's or women's teams to represent the doubles' events.
  - One team, of mixed gender, is eligible to compete in the quads doubles.
- An athlete has to have an official ranking on the Wheelchair Tennis Singles World Ranking List dated 7 June 2021.
- An athlete would be eligible to qualify if they have been in a final nominated team and was present in the World Team Cup events including qualifying and Junior World Team Cup for a minimum of two years between 2017 and 2020.
- An athlete would have to fulfill the minimum requirements in the ITF's Tokyo 2020 Wheelchair Tennis Regulations which will be published in late 2021.
- The ITF and the IPC have to consider on bipartite commission invitation athletes who don't have an official ranking but as long as they have competed in one ITF Wheelchair Tennis competition between 1 January 2018 to 6 June 2021, they will be eligible to compete.

Means of qualification	Date	Venue	Men	Women	Quads	Totals
2018 Asian Para Games	6–13 October 2018	(Indonesia) Jakarta	Shingo Kunieda (JPN)	Yui Kamiji (JPN)	—N/a	2
2019 Parapan American Games	23 August – 1 September 2019	(Peru) Lima	Gustavo Fernández (ARG)	Angélica Bernal (COL)	—N/a	2
Wheelchair tennis singles world rankings	as of 7 June 2021	–	Argentina; Argentina; Australia; Austria; Austria; Austria; Belgium; Belgium; Brazil; Brazil; Brazil; Chile; China; France; France; France; France; Great Britain; Great Britain; Great Britain; Greece; Israel; Israel; Japan; Japan; Japan; Malaysia; Netherlands; Netherlands; Netherlands; Netherlands; Poland; South Africa; South Korea; Spain; Spain; Spain; Spain; Sweden; Thailand; United States	Argentina; Brazil; Chile; China; China; China; China; France; France; Germany; Great Britain; Great Britain; Italy; Japan; Japan; Japan; Netherlands; Netherlands; RPC; South Africa; Switzerland; Thailand; United States; United States	Australia; Australia; Brazil; Canada; Great Britain; Japan; Japan; Netherlands; Netherlands; South Africa; South Korea; United States; United States	74
Bipartite Commission invitation	as of 18 June 2021	–	Australia; Austria; Brazil; Chile; Costa Rica; Greece; Morocco; Poland; Slovakia; South Africa; South Korea; Sri Lanka; Thailand; United States	Brazil; Colombia; France; Morocco; RPC; South Africa; Turkey; United States	Great Britain; Israel; Israel; South Korea	26
Total			56	32	16	104

== Schedule ==
R	Qualifying rounds	QF	Quarterfinals	SF	Semifinals	B	Bronze medal match	F	Gold medal match

Event	2021											
Event	Fri 27 Aug	Sat 28 Aug	Sun 29 Aug	Mon 30 Aug	Tue 31 Aug	Wed 1 Sept		Thu 2 Sept	Fri 3 Sept		Sat 4 Sept	
Men's singles	R64	R32		R16		QF		SF			B	F
Men's doubles		R32	R16	QF	SF				B	F		
Women's singles		R32		R16	QF			SF	B	F		
Women's doubles	R16		QF			SF					B	F
Quads' singles		R16		QF	SF				B		F	
Quads' doubles	QF		SF			B	F					

== Medal table ==
Rank	NPC	Gold	Silver	Bronze	Total
1	Netherlands	3	2	2	7
2	Japan	1	1	2	4
3	Australia	1	1	0	2
4	France	1	0	0	1
5	Great Britain	0	2	2	4
Totals (5 entries)		6	6	6	18

== Medalists ==
Event	Gold	Silver	Bronze
Men's singles	Shingo Kunieda; Japan	Tom Egberink; Netherlands	Gordon Reid; Great Britain
Men's doubles	France; Stéphane Houdet; Nicolas Peifer	Great Britain; Alfie Hewett; Gordon Reid	Netherlands; Tom Egberink; Maikel Scheffers
Women's singles	Diede de Groot; Netherlands	Yui Kamiji; Japan	Jordanne Whiley; Great Britain
Women's doubles	Netherlands; Diede de Groot; Aniek van Koot	Great Britain; Lucy Shuker; Jordanne Whiley	Japan; Yui Kamiji; Momoko Ohtani
Quad singles	Dylan Alcott; Australia	Sam Schröder; Netherlands	Niels Vink; Netherlands
Quad doubles	Netherlands; Sam Schröder; Niels Vink	Australia; Dylan Alcott; Heath Davidson	Japan; Mitsuteru Moroishi; Koji Sugeno

== See also ==
- Tennis at the 2020 Summer Olympics
