= Wheelchair tennis at the 2020 Summer Paralympics – Men's doubles =

Wheelchair tennis – Men's doubles at the XVI Paralympic Games
- Paralympic wheelchair tennis
- Venue: Ariake Tennis Park
- Date: 28 August – 3 September 2021
- Competitors: 23

Medalists
1st place, gold medalist(s)		Stéphane Houdet; Nicolas Peifer	France
2nd place, silver medalist(s)		Alfie Hewett; Gordon Reid	Great Britain
3rd place, bronze medalist(s)		Tom Egberink; Maikel Scheffers	Netherlands

Men's doubles
- Wheelchair tennis at the 2020 Summer Paralympics

Events
Singles	men	women	quad
Doubles	men	women	quad
← 2016 ·	Summer Paralympics	· 2024 →

The men's doubles wheelchair tennis tournament at the 2020 Paralympic Games in Tokyo was held at the Ariake Tennis Park in Kōtō, Tokyo from 28 August to 3 September 2021.

Defending champions Stéphane Houdet and Nicolas Peifer from France extended their title. In the golden final they defeated first seeds Alfie Hewett and Gordon Reid from the United Kingdom, 7–5, 0–6, 7–6.

== Seeds ==
1. Alfie Hewett (GBR) / Gordon Reid (GBR) (final, Silver medalists)
2. Stéphane Houdet (FRA) / Nicolas Peifer (FRA) (gold medalists)
3. Shingo Kunieda (JPN) / Takashi Sanada (JPN) (semifinals)
4. Tom Egberink (NED) / Maikel Scheffers (NED) (semifinals, bronze medalists)
5. Gustavo Fernández (ARG) / Agustin Ledesma (ARG) (quarterfinals)
6. Joachim Gérard (BEL) / Jef Vandorpe (BEL) (quarterfinals)
7. Daniel Caverzaschi (ESP) / Martin de la Puente (ESP) (quarterfinals)
8. Carlos Anker (NED) / Ruben Spaargaren (NED) (quarterfinals)

== Draw ==
=== Finals ===
Semifinals
1	Alfie Hewett (GBR); Gordon Reid (GBR)	6	6
3	Shingo Kunieda (JPN); Takashi Sanada (JPN)	2	1
4	Tom Egberink (NED); Maikel Scheffers (NED)	2	4
2	Stéphane Houdet (FRA); Nicolas Peifer (FRA)	6	6

Gold medal match
1	Alfie Hewett (GBR); Gordon Reid (GBR)	5	6	6^{3}
2	Stéphane Houdet (FRA); Nicolas Peifer (FRA)	7	0	7^{7}
Bronze-medal match
3	Shingo Kunieda (JPN); Takashi Sanada (JPN)	3	2
4	Tom Egberink (NED); Maikel Scheffers (NED)	6	6

=== Top half ===
First round
E Siscar Meseguer (ESP); F Tur (ESP)	6	4	5
T Flax (AUT); N Langmann (AUT)	3	6	7
M Dunn (AUS); B Weekes (AUS)	2	3
G Carneiro Silva (BRA); D Rodrigues (BRA)	6	6
K Fabisiak (POL); P Jaroszewski (POL)	3	6	3
A Cataldo (CHI); J Sepulveda (CHI)	6	4	6

Second round
1	A Hewett (GBR); G Reid (GBR)	6	6
T Flax (AUT); N Langmann (AUT)	0	0
G Carneiro Silva (BRA); D Rodrigues (BRA)	3	1
6	J Gérard (BEL); J Vandorpe (BEL)	6	6
3	S Kunieda (JPN); T Sanada (JPN)	6	6
F Cattanéo (FRA); G Menguy (FRA)	1	1
A Cataldo (CHI); J Sepulveda (CHI)	1	5
8	C Anker (NED); R Spaargaren (NED)	6	7

Quarterfinals
1	A Hewett (GBR); G Reid (GBR)	6	6
6	J Gérard (BEL); J Vandorpe (BEL)	2	2
3	S Kunieda (JPN); T Sanada (JPN)	7^{10}	6
8	C Anker (NED); R Spaargaren (NED)	6^{8}	3

Semifinals
1	A Hewett (GBR); G Reid (GBR)	6	6
3	S Kunieda (JPN); T Sanada (JPN)	2	1

=== Bottom half ===
First round
S Khlongrua (THA); B Suwan (THA)	6^{2}	3
D Arai (JPN); T Miki (JPN)	7^{7}	6
R Medeiros (BRA); M Pommê (BRA)	1	0^{r}
A Berdichevsky (ISR); G Sasson (ISR)	6	2
L Els (RSA); E Maripa (RSA)	7	1	2
C Ratzlaff (USA); C Stroud (USA)	5	6	6
H-w Im (KOR); S-h Oh (KOR)	6	6
M Legner (AUT); J Riegler (AUT)	1	3

Second round
5	G Fernández (ARG); A Ledesma (ARG)	6	2	6
D Arai (JPN); T Miki (JPN)	2	6	3
A Berdichevsky (ISR); G Sasson (ISR)	1	1
4	T Egberink (NED); M Scheffers (NED)	6	6
7	D Caverzaschi (ESP); M de la Puente (ESP)	6	6
C Ratzlaff (USA); C Stroud (USA)	1	2
H-w Im (KOR); S-h Oh (KOR)	1	1
2	S Houdet (FRA); N Peifer (FRA)	6	6

Quarterfinals
5	G Fernández (ARG); A Ledesma (ARG)	1	6	5
4	T Egberink (NED); M Scheffers (NED)	6	3	7
7	D Caverzaschi (ESP); M de la Puente (ESP)	3	4
2	S Houdet (FRA); N Peifer (FRA)	6	6

Semifinals
4	T Egberink (NED); M Scheffers (NED)	2	4
2	S Houdet (FRA); N Peifer (FRA)	6	6
