= Wheelchair tennis at the 2020 Summer Paralympics – Men's singles =

Wheelchair tennis – Men's singles at the XVI Paralympic Games
- Paralympic wheelchair tennis
- Venue: Ariake Tennis Park
- Date: 27 August – 4 September 2021
- Competitors: 56

Medalists
| 1st place, gold medalist(s) | | Shingo Kunieda | Japan |
| 2nd place, silver medalist(s) | | Tom Egberink | Netherlands |
| 3rd place, bronze medalist(s) | | Gordon Reid | Great Britain |

Men's singles
- Wheelchair tennis at the 2020 Summer Paralympics

Events
| Singles | men | women | quad |
| Doubles | men | women | quad |
| ← 2016 · | Summer Paralympics | · 2024 → |

The men's singles wheelchair tennis tournament at the 2020 Paralympic Games in Tokyo was held at the Ariake Tennis Park in Kōtō, Tokyo from 27 August to 4 September 2021.

Japan's Shingo Kunieda defeated the Netherlands' Tom Egberink in the final, 6–1, 6–2 to win the gold medal in men's singles wheelchair tennis at the 2020 Tokyo Paralympics. It was his third Paralympic singles gold medal, and fourth Paralympic gold overall.

Great Britain's Gordon Reid was the defending gold medalist, but was defeated by Kunieda in the semifinals; he went on to defeat compatriot Alfie Hewett in the bronze-medal match, in a rematch of the previous edition's final.

== Seeds ==
1. Shingo Kunieda (JPN) (champion, gold medalist)
2. Alfie Hewett (GBR) (semifinals)
3. Joachim Gérard (BEL) (third round)
4. Gustavo Fernández (ARG) (quarterfinals)
5. Gordon Reid (GBR) (semifinals, bronze medalist)
6. Stéphane Houdet (FRA) (quarterfinals)
7. Nicolas Peifer (FRA) (quarterfinals)
8. Tom Egberink (NED) (final, silver medalist)

9. Takashi Sanada (JPN) (third round)
10. Stefan Olsson (SWE) (third round)
11. Martin de la Puente (ESP) (third round)
12. Takuya Miki (JPN) (third round)
13. Daniel Caverzaschi (ESP) (quarterfinals)
14. Maikel Scheffers (NED) (second round)
15. Jef Vandorpe (BEL) (third round)
16. Ruben Spaargaren (NED) (third round)

Click on the seed number of a player to go to their draw section.

== Draw ==
=== Key ===
- Q = Qualifier
- WC = Wild card
- LL = Lucky loser
- Alt = Alternate
- ITF = ITF entry
- PR = Protected ranking
- SR = Special ranking
- SE = Special exempt
- JE = Junior exempt
- JR = Junior Accelerator Programme entrant
- CO = College Accelerator Programme entrant
- NG = Next Gen Accelerator Program entrant
- w/o = Walkover
- r = Retired
- d = Defaulted
- BPC = Bipartite Invitation

=== Finals ===
Quarterfinals
1 | Shingo Kunieda (JPN) | 7^{9} | 6
6 | Stéphane Houdet (FRA) | 6^{7} | 3
4 | Gustavo Fernández (ARG) | 5 | 6 | 1
5 | Gordon Reid (GBR) | 7 | 3 | 6
8 | Tom Egberink (NED) | 6 | 6
13 | Daniel Caverzaschi (ESP) | 4 | 3
7 | Nicolas Peifer (FRA) | 3 | 4
2 | Alfie Hewett (GBR) | 6 | 6

Semifinals
1 | Shingo Kunieda (JPN) | 6 | 6
5 | Gordon Reid (GBR) | 3 | 2
8 | Tom Egberink (NED) | 6 | 7^{7}
2 | Alfie Hewett (GBR) | 4 | 6^{5}

Final (gold-medal match)
1 | Shingo Kunieda (JPN) | 6 | 6
8 | Tom Egberink (NED) | 1 | 2
Bronze-medal match
5 | Gordon Reid (GBR) | 6 | 3 | 7
2 | Alfie Hewett (GBR) | 4 | 6 | 5

=== Top half ===
==== Section 1 ====
First round
S Diamantis (GRE) | 6^{4} | 6 | 0
M Gergely (SVK) | 7^{7} | 3 | 6
Z Ji (CHN) | 6 | 6
M Legner (AUT) | 1 | 0
C Stroud (USA) | 4 | 3
14 | M Scheffers (NED) | 6 | 6
11 | M de la Puente (ESP) | 6 | 6
A Ledesma (ARG) | 1 | 1
P Jaroszewski (POL) | 1 | 6 | 6
J Sepulveda (CHI) | 6 | 4 | 4
R Medeiros (BRA) | 5 | 1
L Boukartacha (MAR) | 7 | 6

Second round
1 | S Kunieda (JPN) | 6 | 6
M Gergely (SVK) | 0 | 1
Z Ji (CHN) | 6 | 6
14 | M Scheffers (NED) | 4 | 4
11 | M de la Puente (ESP) | 6 | 6
P Jaroszewski (POL) | 1 | 1
L Boukartacha (MAR) | 0 | 2
6 | S Houdet (FRA) | 6 | 6

Third round
1 | S Kunieda (JPN) | 6 | 6
Z Ji (CHN) | 0 | 1
11 | M de la Puente (ESP) | 3 | 0
6 | S Houdet (FRA) | 6 | 6

Quarterfinals
1 | S Kunieda (JPN) | 7^{9} | 6
6 | S Houdet (FRA) | 6^{7} | 3

==== Section 2 ====
First round
B Suwan (THA) | 1 | 4
F Tur (ESP) | 6 | 6
A Berdichevsky (ISR) | 4 | 2
B Weekes (AUS) | 6 | 6
N Langmann (AUT) | 4 | 1
15 | J Vandorpe (BEL) | 6 | 6
9 | T Sanada (JPN) | 6 | 6
C Anker (NED) | 1 | 1
G Menguy (FRA) | 6 | 4 | 1
H-w Im (KOR) | 3 | 6 | 6
L Els (RSA) | 1 | 6 | 6
G Carneiro Silva (BRA) | 6 | 4 | 3

Second round
4 | G Fernández (ARG) | 6 | 6
F Tur (ESP) | 1 | 0
B Weekes (AUS) | 6 | 1 | 0
15 | J Vandorpe (BEL) | 3 | 6 | 6
9 | T Sanada (JPN) | 6 | 6
H-w Im (KOR) | 2 | 1
L Els (RSA) | 2 | 0
5 | G Reid (GBR) | 6 | 6

Third round
4 | G Fernández (ARG) | 6 | 6
15 | J Vandorpe (BEL) | 2 | 1
9 | T Sanada (JPN) | 2 | 1
5 | G Reid (GBR) | 6 | 6

Quarterfinals
4 | G Fernández (ARG) | 5 | 6 | 1
5 | G Reid (GBR) | 7 | 3 | 6

=== Bottom half ===
==== Section 3 ====
First round
AS Borhan (MAS) | 4 | 6 | 6
JP Gil (CRC) | 6 | 3 | 2
G Sasson (ISR) | 1 | 1
D Arai (JPN) | 6 | 6
D Rodrigues (BRA) | 3 | 2
10 | S Olsson (SWE) | 6 | 6
13 | D Caverzaschi (ESP) | 6 | 6
D Bailey (GBR) | 2 | 0
T Flax (AUT) | 2 | 0
E Maripa (RSA) | 6 | 6
C Ratzlaff (USA) | 6 | 7
F Cattanéo (FRA) | 2 | 5

Second round
8 | T Egberink (NED) | 6 | 6
AS Borhan (MAS) | 0 | 1
D Arai (JPN) | 0 | 2
10 | S Olsson (SWE) | 6 | 6
13 | D Caverzaschi (ESP) | 6 | 6
E Maripa (RSA) | 2 | 4
C Ratzlaff (USA) | 1 | 1
3 | J Gérard (BEL) | 6 | 6

Third round
8 | T Egberink (NED) | 1 | 7^{7} | 6
10 | S Olsson (SWE) | 6 | 6^{4} | 3
13 | D Caverzaschi (ESP) | 6 | 6
3 | J Gérard (BEL) | 3 | 4

Quarterfinals
8 | T Egberink (NED) | 6 | 6
13 | D Caverzaschi (ESP) | 4 | 3

==== Section 4 ====
First round
S-h Oh (KOR) | 6 | 6
M Pommê (BRA) | 0 | 3
E Casco (ARG) | 6 | 6
M Dunn (AUS) | 0 | 0
E Siscar Meseguer (ESP) | 1 | 2
12 | T Miki (JPN) | 6 | 6
16 | R Spaargaren (NED) | 6 | 6
J Riegler (AUT) | 0 | 1
A Cataldo (CHI) | 6 | 6
DSR Dharmasena (SRI) | 3 | 4
K Fabisiak (POL) | 4 | 6 | 6
S Khlongrua (THA) | 6 | 2 | 1

Second round
7 | N Peifer (FRA) | 6 | 6
S-h Oh (KOR) | 0 | 2
E Casco (ARG) | 3 | 1
12 | T Miki (JPN) | 6 | 6
16 | R Spaargaren (NED) | 6 | 6
A Cataldo (CHI) | 2 | 3
K Fabisiak (POL) | 1 | 2
2 | A Hewett (GBR) | 6 | 6

Third round
7 | N Peifer (FRA) | 6 | 6
12 | T Miki (JPN) | 2 | 3
16 | R Spaargaren (NED) | 1 | 6 | 3
2 | A Hewett (GBR) | 6 | 2 | 6

Quarterfinals
7 | N Peifer (FRA) | 3 | 4
2 | A Hewett (GBR) | 6 | 6
