= British Open (disambiguation) =

The British Open often refers to the Open Championship men's golf tournament.

British Open may also refer to:

- British Open (ballroom), the dancing competitions of the Blackpool Dance Festival
- British Open (darts), a darts tournament
- Women's British Open of golf
- British Open Show Jumping Championships
- British Open (snooker), an annual tournament which was originally run from 1980 until 2004 before it was revived in 2021.
- British Open (real tennis)
- British Open Squash Championships
- British Open (tennis) or Wimbledon Championships (informally known as The Championships, Wimbledon)
- British Open Wheelchair Championships, a wheelchair tennis tournament that Nimrod Bichler has coached some participants of
