= Nimrod Bichler =

Israeli wheelchair tennis coach

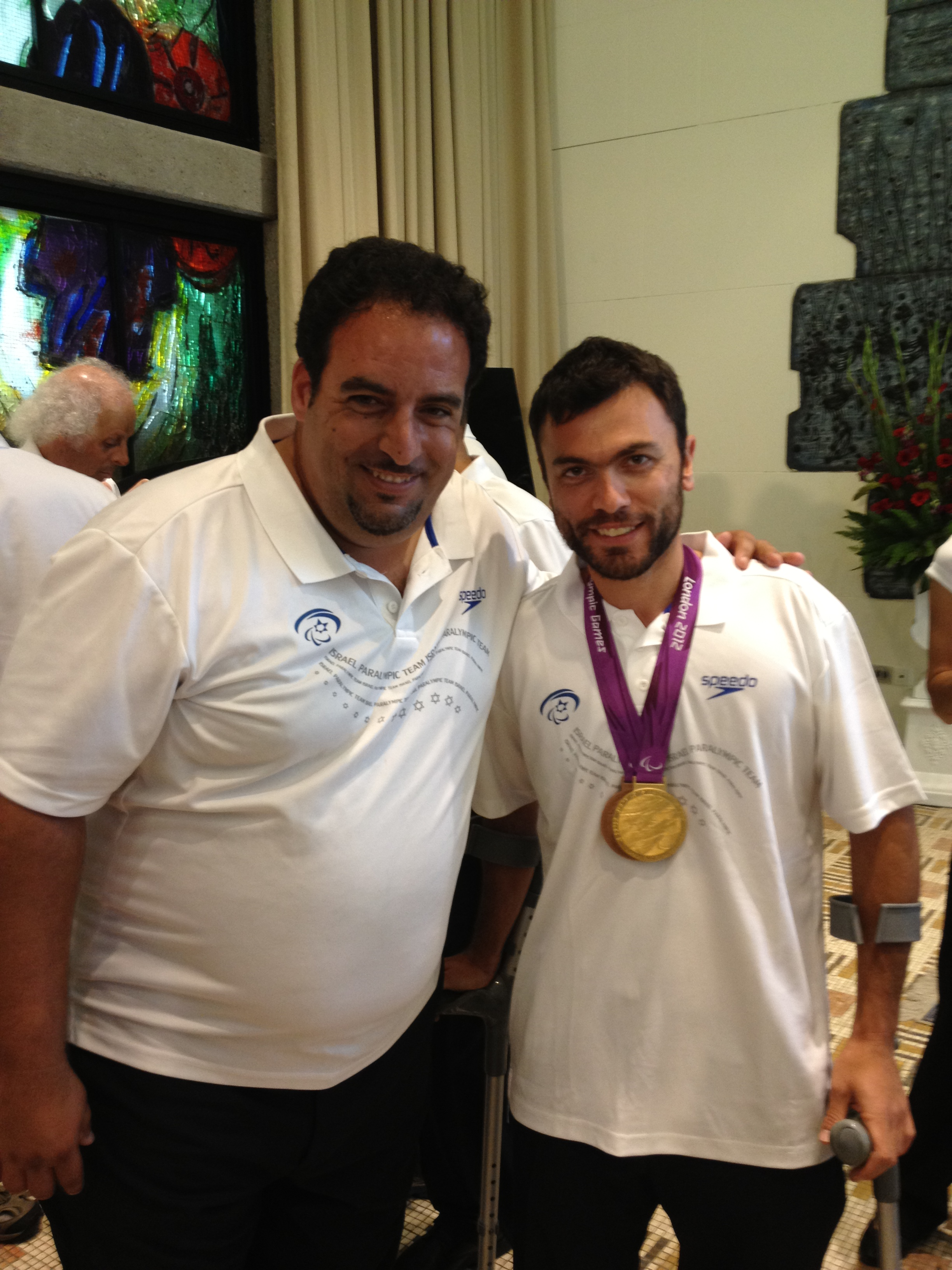
Coach Nimrod Bichler with Gold Medalist Noam Gershony

Nimrod Bichler (Hebrew: נמרוד ביכלר; born 6 October 1974) is an Israeli wheelchair tennis coach. At the 2012 Summer Paralympics he coached gold medalist Noam Gershony in the Quad division.

== Biography and tennis career ==
Nimrod Bichler was born in Jerusalem, Israel. He started playing tennis at the age of ten in the Israel Tennis Center in Jerusalem and competed in national junior tournaments until the age of 18. By the year 1992, he was ranked 4th in Israel in the junior tennis rankings. Shortly after his military service, he began coaching junior players in the Ingber Tennis Academy in Jerusalem. In late 1996, he joined Spivak Sports Center for the Disabled as the Head Wheelchair Tennis Coach. During his time at Spivak, he coached the Israeli National Wheelchair tennis team (Quad), led the team to back-to-back World Team Cup wins (1999 and 2000), and guided Shraga Weinberg to becoming the first Israeli player ever to win a super series tournament at the British Open and consequently to world #1 ranking in 2001. In 2002, Nimrod became the Head Wheelchair Tennis Coach at the Beit Halochem Sport Center for Disabled Veterans. Since then, he has coached both the Men's and Women's National Teams. In 2007, when Noam Gershony joined Beit Halochem, Nimrod began coaching him. Noam participated in international tournaments beginning in 2010, including a first ever Israeli win in the Singles Masters and winning super series titles in Sydney, Paris, and Nottingham. In May 2012, Nimrod led the Israeli Quad Team to its fourth World Team Cup in Seoul, Korea.

== Paralympic Games ==
In 2012, Nimrod led Noam Gershony to two medals at the London Summer Paralympic Games. The first medal, Bronze in doubles, shared with Shraga Weinberg, following a bronze medal match win against the Japanese team of Shota Kawano and Mitsuteru Moroishi. A second medal, Gold, in singles, following a finals game in which Noam defeated world number one, David Wagner of the US. This was Israel's only gold medal in the London Games and the first ever singles medal in Israeli tennis history. Following the Paralympics, Noam reached world number one, making him the second player that Nimrod had coached that had reached world number one in the rankings of the quad division of wheelchair tennis. Nimrod was part of the team that was honored at the Presidential Residence by President Shimon Peres and Prime Minister Benjamin Netanyahu in September 2012.
