= Nonhlanhla =

- Gender: Female
- Language: Nguni languages

Origin
- Meaning: Luck/ One who is lucky

Other names
- Variant form: Lehlogonolo (Sepedi version)

Nonhlanhla (Nhlanhla unisex) is a feminine given name, derived from the Nguni word nhlanhla, meaning "luck". Another meaning includes the Goddess of Luck. Notable people with the name include:

- Kelly Nonhlanhla Khumalo (born 1984), South African musician
- Nonhlanhla Khoza, South African politician
- Nonhlanhla Mthandi (born 1995), South African soccer player
- Nonhlanhla Nkabinde, South African politician
- Nonhlanhla Nyathi (born 1987), Zimbabwean cricketer
