= Wheelchair tennis at the 2016 Summer Paralympics – Quad doubles =

Wheelchair tennis – Quad doubles at the XV Paralympic Games
- Paralympic wheelchair tennis
- Venue: Olympic Tennis Centre
- Dates: 10–13 September 2016
- Competitors: 12 from 6 nations

Medalists
1st place, gold medalist(s)		Dylan Alcott; Heath Davidson	Australia
2nd place, silver medalist(s)		Nick Taylor; David Wagner	United States
3rd place, bronze medalist(s)		Andrew Lapthorne; Jamie Burdekin	Great Britain

Quad doubles
- Wheelchair tennis at the 2016 Summer Paralympics

Events
Singles	men	women	quad
Doubles	men	women	quad
← 2012 ·	Summer Paralympics	· 2020 →

The quad doubles wheelchair tennis tournament at the 2016 Paralympic Games in Rio de Janeiro was held at the Olympic Tennis Centre in the Barra Olympic Park in Barra da Tijuca in the west zone of Rio de Janeiro, Brazil from 9 to 13 September 2016.

== Seeds ==
1. Nick Taylor (USA) / David Wagner (USA) (final, silver medalists)
2. Andrew Lapthorne (GBR) / Jamie Burdekin (GBR) (semifinals, bronze medalists)

== Draw ==
Quarterfinals
1	Nick Taylor (USA); David Wagner (USA)
bye
Itai Erinlib (ISR); Shraga Weinberg (ISR)	6	6
Rodrigo Oliveira (BRA); Ymanitu Silva (BRA)	0	0
Shota Kawona (JPN); Mitsuteru Moroishi (JPN)	1	4
Dylan Alcott (AUS); Heath Davidson (AUS)	6	6
bye
2	Jamie Burdekin (GBR); Andrew Lapthorne (GBR)

Semifinals
1	Nick Taylor (USA); David Wagner (USA)	6	6
Itai Erinlib (ISR); Shraga Weinberg (ISR)	0	0
Dylan Alcott (AUS); Heath Davidson (AUS)	6	6
2	Jamie Burdekin (GBR); Andrew Lapthorne (GBR)	1	2

Final (gold medal match)
1	Nick Taylor (USA); David Wagner (USA)	6	4	5
Dylan Alcott (AUS); Heath Davidson (AUS)	4	6	7
Bronze medal match
Itai Erinlib (ISR); Shraga Weinberg (ISR)	6	4	6^{2}
2	Jamie Burdekin (GBR); Andrew Lapthorne (GBR)	4	6	7^{7}
