= Wheelchair tennis at the 2012 Summer Paralympics – Quad doubles =

Wheelchair tennis – Quad doubles at the XIV Paralympic Games
- Paralympic wheelchair tennis
- Venue: Eton Manor, London
- Dates: 2–5 September 2012

Medalists
1st place, gold medalist(s)		Nicholas Taylor; David Wagner	United States
2nd place, silver medalist(s)		Andrew Lapthorne; Peter Norfolk	Great Britain
3rd place, bronze medalist(s)		Noam Gershony; Shraga Weinberg	Israel

Quad doubles
- Wheelchair tennis at the 2012 Summer Paralympics

Events
Singles	men	women	quad
Doubles	men	women	quad
← 2008 ·	Summer Paralympics	· 2016 →

The quad doubles event at the 2012 Paralympic Games took place on 2 September – 5 September, at Eton Manor, London.

== Calendar ==
September	2	3	4	5
Round	Quarterfinals	Semifinals	None	Bronze; Final

== Seeds ==
1. Andrew Lapthorne (GBR) / Peter Norfolk (GBR) (silver medalists)
2. Nicholas Taylor (USA) / David Wagner (USA) (gold medalists)

== Draw ==
=== Key ===
- INV = Bipartite invitation
- ITF = ITF place
- ALT = Alternative
- r = Retired
- w/o = Walkover

Quarterfinals
S Kawano (JPN); M Moroishi (JPN)	6	7
M Innocenti (ITA); G Polidori (ITA)	3	6
N Gershony (ISR); S Weinberg (ISR)	6	6
A Hard (SWE); M Jonsson (SWE)	2	4

Semifinals
1	A Lapthorne (GBR); P Norfolk (GBR)	6	6
S Kawano (JPN); M Moroishi (JPN)	2	2
N Gershony (ISR); S Weinberg (ISR)	3	6
2	N Taylor (USA); D Wagner (USA)	6	7

Final (gold-medal match)
1	A Lapthorne (GBR); P Norfolk (GBR)	2	7	2
2	N Taylor (USA); D Wagner (USA)	6	5	6
Bronze-medal match
S Kawano (JPN); M Moroishi (JPN)	3	1
N Gershony (ISR); S Weinberg (ISR)	6	6
