= Martyn Dunn =

Australian wheelchair tennis player

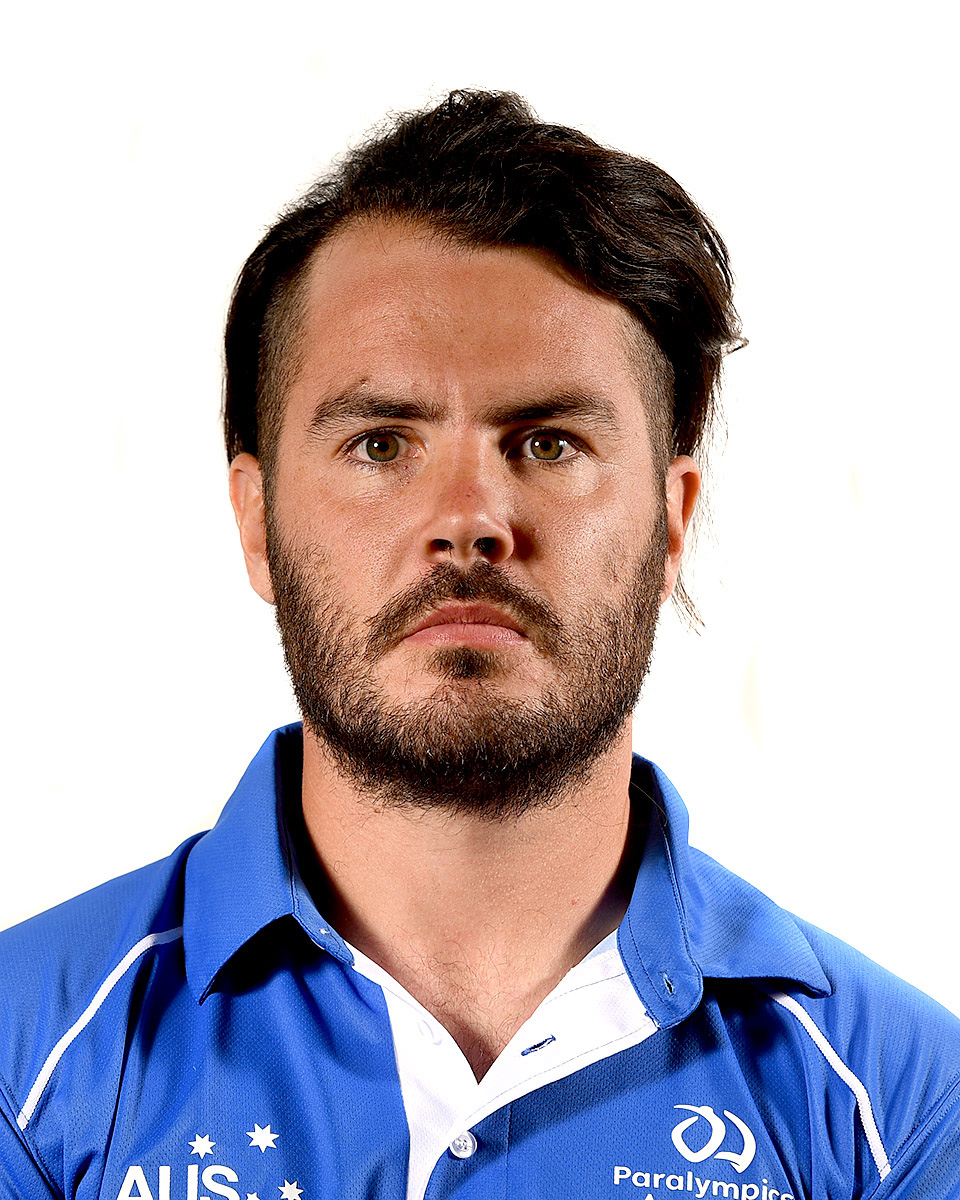
- Martyn Dunn in 2019

Personal information
- Nationality: Australian
- Born: 25 December 1992 (age 33)

Sport
- Country: Australia
- Sport: Wheelchair tennis

Martyn Dunn (born 25 December 1992) is an Australian wheelchair tennis player. He represented Australia at the 2020 Tokyo Paralympics, his first Games.

== Personal ==
Dunn was born on 25 December 1992. He attended Saint Ignatius College, Geelong. He was an apprentice carpenter before a motorcycle accident in November 2015. The accident resulted in a fractured shoulder, shoulder blade, four ribs — one which was removed in surgery - and back broken in four places, with spinal cord damage at the T12 level.

== Tennis ==
Before his accident, Dunn played tennis and Australian Football. After his accident, he took up wheelchair tennis as part of his rehabilitation. Tennis Australia's national wheelchair coach, Greg Crump, identified Dunn as a promising wheelchair tennis player.

At the 2020 Tokyo Paralympics, Dunn lost in the Round of 64 in the Men's Singles and Round of 32 in the Doubles.
