= Shota Kawano =

Japanese wheelchair tennis player

Shota Kawano (川野将太, Kawano Shōta, born 16 September 1985) is a Japanese wheelchair tennis player. He represented Japan at the 2012 Summer Paralympics in quad singles and quad doubles and at the 2016 Summer Paralympics in quad singles and quad doubles. His doubles partner both years was Mitsuteru Moroishi. At the 2015 ITF German Open, Kawano won the men's quad singles and quad doubles events.
