= Lehlogonolo =

Lehlogonolo may refer to:

- Lehlogonolo Ronald Mataboge, South African rapper known as A-Reece
- Lehlogonolo Masoga, South African politician
- Lehlogonolo Tholo, South African basketball player
- Lehlogonolo Masalesa, South African footballer

== See also ==
- Lehlo Ledwaba, South African boxer
- Lehlohonolo Molefe, South African rapper known as 25K
- Lehlohonolo Majoro, South African footballer
- Lehlohonolo Seema, Mosotho footballer
- Lehlohonolo Moromella, Basotho swimmer
- Lehlohonolo Nonyane, South African soccer player
- Lehlomela Ramabele, Mosotho footballer
- Lehlohonolo Selepe, South African politician
