= Heath Davidson =

Australian wheelchair tennis player

Heath Davidson OAM
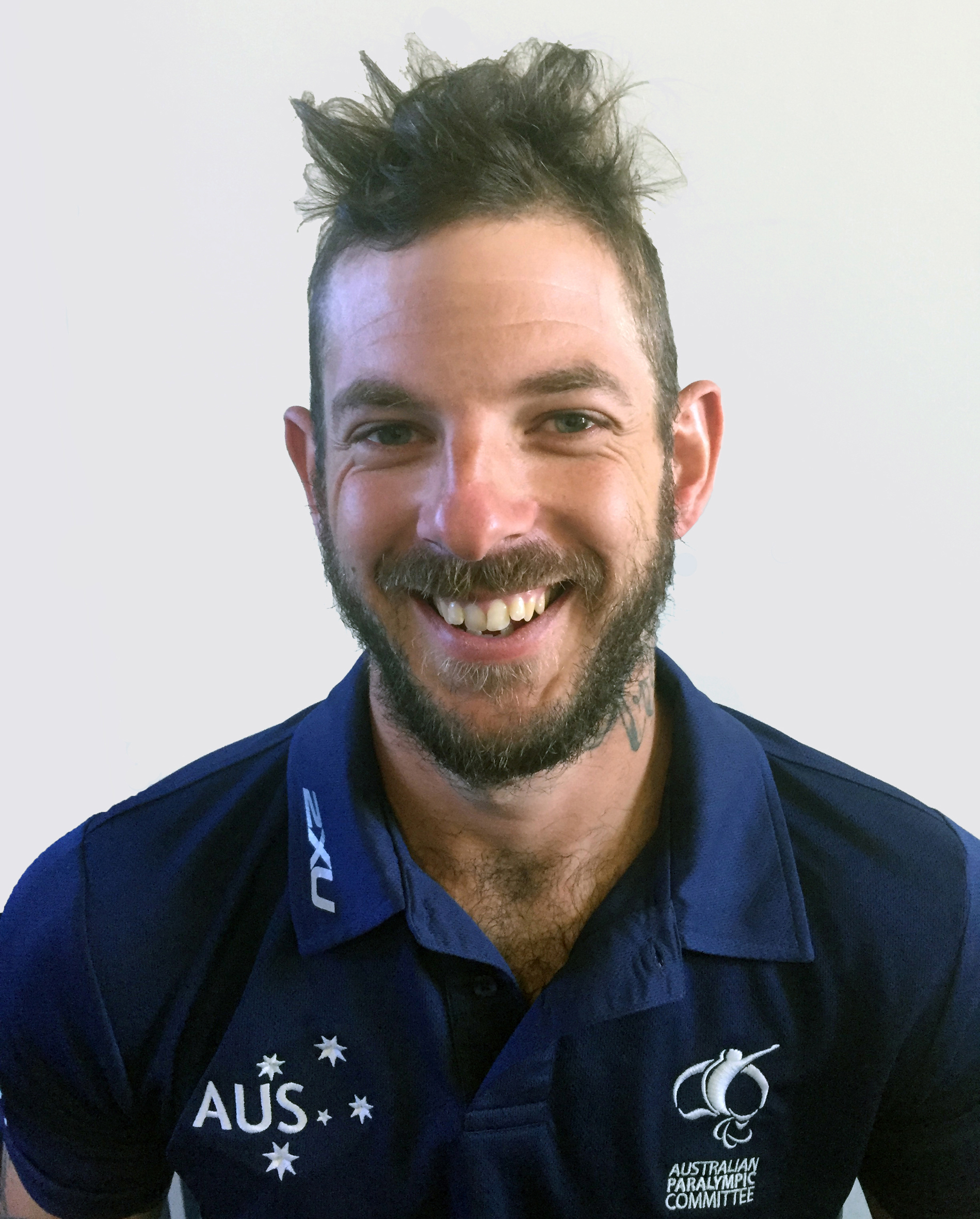
- 2016 Australian Paralympic team portrait
- Country (sports): Australia
- Residence: Langwarrin, Victoria
- Born: 9 May 1987 (age 39) Rosebud, Victoria, Australia

Singles
- Career record: 197–143
- Highest ranking: No. 4 (16 April 2018)
- Current ranking: No. 12 (26 January 2026)

Grand Slam singles results
- Australian Open: SF (2022)
- French Open: SF (2022)
- Wimbledon: F (2023)
- US Open: QF (2021, 2022, 2023)

Other tournaments
- Paralympic Games: QF (2016, 2020)

Doubles
- Career record: 196–87
- Highest ranking: No. 1 (9 December 2019)
- Current ranking: No. 3 (26 January 2026)

Grand Slam doubles results
- Australian Open: W (2018, 2019, 2020, 2021)
- French Open: F (2022, 2023)
- Wimbledon: F (2023)
- US Open: F (2021)

Other doubles tournaments
- Masters Doubles: W (2019)
- Paralympic Games: W (2016)
Medal record
Men's wheelchair tennis
Representing Australia
Paralympic Games
Gold medal – first place	2016 Rio de Janeiro	Quad doubles
Silver medal – second place	2020 Tokyo	Quad doubles

Heath Arthur Davidson, OAM (born 9 May 1987) is an Australian wheelchair tennis player. Davidson is a four-time Australian Open doubles champion, all partnering Dylan Alcott. He has also won two Paralympic medals, a gold and silver in doubles at the 2016 Rio and 2020 Tokyo Paralympics, respectively (both also partnering Alcott). He has been selected for the 2024 Paris Paralympics, his third Games.

== Early life ==
Davidson was born on 9 May 1987. He contracted viral transverse myelitis at the age of five months and this led to paraplegia. He attended Parkdale Secondary College in Melbourne.

== Wheelchair tennis career ==
Davidson started playing wheelchair tennis at the age of 14. In 2001, At the Australian Disabled Games in Queensland he won a bronze medal in wheelchair tennis and two silver medals for table tennis. After ten years he retired from the sport.

After Davidson returned to wheelchair tennis, he teamed with Dylan Alcott to win the prestigious BNP Paribas World Team Cup held in Tokyo, Japan in May 2016. They upset Great Britain in the final. Davidson and Alcott won the Men's Quad Doubles gold medal at the Rio Paralympics. They defeated the reigning champions David Wagner and Nick Taylor in the gold medal match 4–6, 6–4, 7–5. In the Men's Quad Singles, Davidson lost to Andy Lapthorne (GBR) 0–2 (1–6, 2–6) in the quarter-finals.

In May 2017, Davidson won his first international quad singles title by winning the Korea Open. In 2019, Davidson and his partner Niels Vink won the 2019 Wheelchair Tennis Masters in quad doubles.

At the 2020 Tokyo Paralympics, he teamed with Alcott to win the Men's Quad Doubles silver medal. He lost in the Men's Quad Singles quarter final.

== Recognition ==
Davidson won the Variety Australia Young Sports Achievers Award in 2003 with Dylan Alcott. In 2016, he shared Tennis Australia's Most Outstanding Athlete with a Disability with doubles partner Dylan Alcott. He was awarded the Medal of the Order of Australia in 2017. In 2022, he was awarded Tennis Australia's Most Outstanding Athlete with a Disability.

== Grand Slam tournament finals ==
=== Quad singles: 1 (1 runner-up) ===
Result	Year	Tournament	Surface	Opponent	Score
Loss	2023	Wimbledon	Grass	(Netherlands) Niels Vink	1–6, 2–6

=== Quad doubles: 9 (4 titles, 5 runner-ups) ===
Result	Year	Tournament	Surface	Partner	Opponents	Score
Loss	2017	Australian Open	Hard	(Australia) Dylan Alcott	(United Kingdom) Andrew Lapthorne (United States) David Wagner	3–6, 3–6
Winner	2018	Australian Open	Hard	(Australia) Dylan Alcott	(United Kingdom) Andrew Lapthorne (United States) David Wagner	6–0, 6–7^{(5–7)}, [10–6]
Winner	2019	Australian Open (2)	Hard	(Australia) Dylan Alcott	(United Kingdom) Andrew Lapthorne (United States) David Wagner	6–3, 6–7^{(6–8)}, [12–10]
Winner	2020	Australian Open (3)	Hard	(Australia) Dylan Alcott	(United Kingdom) Andrew Lapthorne (United States) David Wagner	6–4, 6–3
Winner	2021	Australian Open (4)	Hard	(Australia) Dylan Alcott	(United Kingdom) Andrew Lapthorne (United States) David Wagner	6–2, 3–6, [10–7]
Loss	2021	US Open	Hard	(Australia) Dylan Alcott	(Netherlands) Sam Schröder (Netherlands) Niels Vink	3–6, 2–6
Loss	2022	French Open	Clay	(Brazil) Ymanitu Silva	(Netherlands) Sam Schröder (Netherlands) Niels Vink	2–6, 2–6
Loss	2023	Wimbledon	Grass	(Canada) Robert Shaw	(Netherlands) Sam Schröder (Netherlands) Niels Vink	6–7^{(5–7)}, 0–6
Loss	2026	Australian Open	Hard	(United Kingdom) Andrew Lapthorne	(Israel) Guy Sasson (Netherlands) Niels Vink	3–6, 1–6
