= Andy Lapthorne =

British wheelchair tennis player

Andy Lapthorne MBE
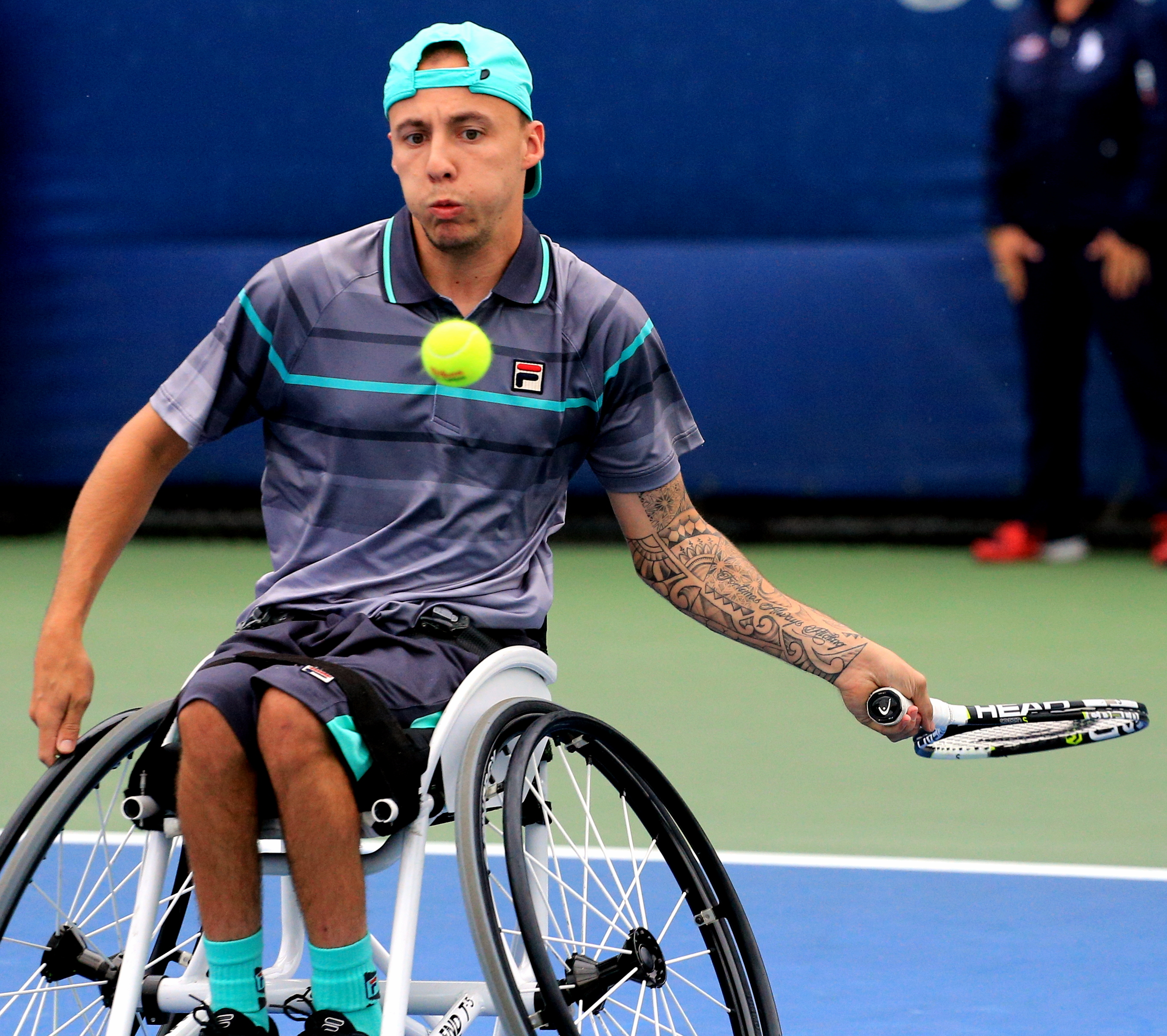
- Lapthorne in 2015
- Full name: Andrew David Lapthorne
- Country (sports): United Kingdom
- Born: 11 October 1990 (age 35) Middlesex, England
- Turned pro: 2005

Singles
- Career record: 285–160
- Career titles: 58
- Highest ranking: No. 1 (27 January 2020)
- Current ranking: No. 4 (2 September 2024)

Grand Slam singles results
- Australian Open: F (2020)
- French Open: F (2020)
- Wimbledon: F (2019)
- US Open: W (2014, 2019)

Other tournaments
- Masters: F (2011, 2012, 2017, 2018)
- Paralympic Games: F (2016)

Doubles
- Career record: 177–96
- Highest ranking: No. 1 (31 January 2011)
- Current ranking: No. 3 (2 September 2024)

Grand Slam doubles results
- Australian Open: W (2011, 2012, 2014, 2015, 2017, 2022, 2024, 2025)
- French Open: W (2021, 2023)
- Wimbledon: W (2019, 2021)
- US Open: W (2017, 2018, 2019, 2020)

Other doubles tournaments
- Masters Doubles: W (2010, 2016)
- Paralympic Games: F (2012, 2024)
Medal record
Men's wheelchair tennis
Representing Great Britain
Paralympic Games
Silver medal – second place	2012 London	Quad doubles
Silver medal – second place	2016 Rio de Janeiro	Quad singles
Silver medal – second place	2024 Paris	Quad doubles
Bronze medal – third place	2016 Rio de Janeiro	Quad doubles
- Last updated on: 4 September 2024.

Andrew David Lapthorne (born 11 October 1990) is a British wheelchair tennis player. He took up wheelchair tennis in 2005, and entered the quad division in 2008. He is active in both singles and doubles tournaments, and has 17 grand slam titles in singles and doubles. He competed at his first Summer Paralympics at London 2012 in the quad singles and in the quad doubles, in which he won a silver medal and is now a four-time Paralympic medallist and British no.1 Quad tennis player, who started playing wheelchair tennis at the age of 10.

== Early life ==
Lapthorne has cerebral palsy, and uses a wheelchair. He can walk for limited periods, but not very far and the condition has left him unable to straighten his arms fully. He joined a disabled football team at the age of eight, and also tried wheelchair basketball.

== Wheelchair tennis career ==
Lapthorne took up wheelchair tennis full-time in 2005 after playing at a sports camp for people in wheelchairs. He was spotted by coaches from the Tennis Federation, and became a professional player. In 2008, he registered in the quad division and in his first quad tournament he reached the semi-final of the 2008 Nottingham Indoor event. In 2009 he reached the finals of his first tournaments including defeating Johan Andersson, who was the silver medallist at the 2008 Summer Paralympics, in the quarter finals of the Florida Open.

Lapthorne began teaming up with Peter Norfolk of Great Britain, to compete in the quad doubles. They appeared at the Florida Open in 2009 for the first time, and defeated the reigning Olympic champions in the first round before going on to win the tournament. Lapthorne won his first singles title during the same year, at the Wroclaw Cup, and also won the singles title at Prague Cup Czech Indoor resulting in completing his first full season as a quad player ranked ninth in the world.

In 2010, Lapthorne won both the Melbourne Open singles titles and doubles alongside Norfolk. He reached the final of the Sydney Open and regularly appeared in the quarter finals of the year's Super Series tournaments. His world ranking in 2010 improved to number six, and he won the end of season Camozzi Doubles Masters, teaming with Norfolk once more. In 2011, he appeared at a Grand Slam for the first time, winning the doubles tournament with Norfolk which increased their ranking to number one in the world. It was the first occasion that an all-British pair had won a quad doubles grand slam, as the duo defeated David Wagner and Nick Taylor to win the title. It marked the fourth victory that Lapthorne and Norfolk had during the previous two seasons over Wagner and Taylor, the reigning Paralympics champions. They retained the title a year later.

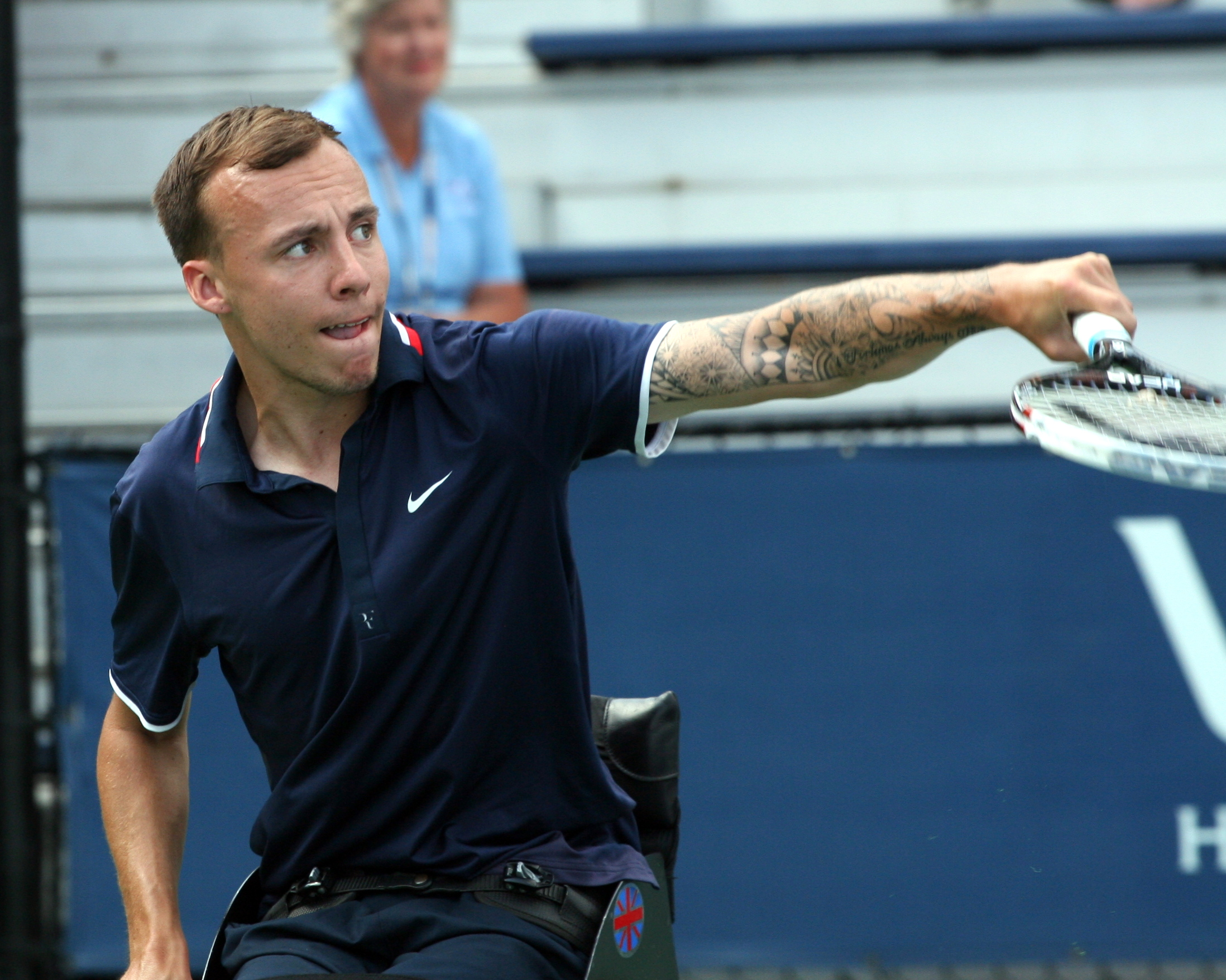
Lapthorne at the US Open Wheelchairs in 2013

Lapthorne was selected for the Great Britain squad for the 2012 Summer Paralympics in London in both the quad singles and quad doubles tennis events. Channel 4 featured Norfolk in a special aired on 7 August 2012, prior to the London Paralympics. Lapthorne was also featured in the special resulting in The Daily Telegraph describing him as "the young pretender, talented, aggressive and gobby in the extreme". At the time of the Paralympics, he was ranked fourth in the world in the singles, and number one in the doubles with Norfolk. In the singles, he was drawn against Anders Hard in the first round, while he and Norfolk received a bye to the semi-finals of the doubles tournament. He was knocked out of the singles competition in the first round by Hard, with a score of 7–5, 3–6, 3–6. However, in the doubles tournament he reached the final against Taylor and Wagner. Before the match he received good luck messages from the West Ham football team, and fellow tennis player Andy Murray. The British pair lost the match, 2–6, 7–5, 2–6, but Lapthorne and Norfolk won a silver medal each in the process.

In 2014 Lapthorne went on to win the US open singles title. In January 2019, Lapthorne and partner David Wagner were beaten in the quad wheelchair doubles final in the Australian Open.

Playing with Israeli Guy Sasson at the 2024 French Open, the two made it to the finals where they were defeated by Niels Vink and Sam Schröder of the Netherlands.

Lapthorne won a silver medal at the 2024 Summer Paralympics in the quad doubles playing alongside Gregory Slade.

== Career statistics ==
=== Grand Slam performance timelines ===
Key
W	F	SF	QF	#R	RR	Q#	DNQ	A	NH

(W) winner; (F) finalist; (SF) semifinalist; (QF) quarterfinalist; (#R) rounds 4, 3, 2, 1; (RR) round-robin stage; (Q#) qualification round; (DNQ) did not qualify; (A) absent; (NH) not held; (SR) strike rate (events won / competed); (W–L) win–loss record.
To avoid confusion and double counting, these charts are updated at the conclusion of a tournament or when the player's participation has ended.

==== Quad Singles ====
Tournament	2011	2012	2013	2014	2015	2016	2017	2018	2019	2020	2021	2022	2023	2024	2025	2026	SR
Australian Open	RR	RR	F	RR	RR	RR	F	RR	RR	F	SF	SF	QF	QF	QF	1R	0 / 16
French Open	Not held								A	RR	SF	QF	SF	QF	QF	QF	0 / 7
Wimbledon	Not held								F	NH	SF	QF	QF	SF	QF		0 / 6
US Open	A	NH	RR	W	RR	NH	F	RR	W	RR	SF	QF	SF	NH	SF		2 / 12

=== Grand Slam finals ===
==== Quad singles: (2 titles, 5 runner-ups) ====
Result	Year	Tournament	Surface	Opponent	Score
Win	2014	US Open	Hard	(United States) David Wagner	7–5, 6–2
Loss	2017	Australian Open	Hard	(Australia) Dylan Alcott	2–6, 2–6
Loss	2017	US Open	Hard	(United States) David Wagner	5–7, 6–3, 4–6
Loss	2019	Wimbledon	Grass	(Australia) Dylan Alcott	0–6, 2–6
Win	2019	US Open (2)	Hard	(Australia) Dylan Alcott	6–1, 6–0
Loss	2020	Australian Open	Hard	(Australia) Dylan Alcott	0–6, 4–6
Loss	2020	French Open	Clay	(Australia) Dylan Alcott	2–6, 2–6

=== Quad doubles: 31 (16 titles, 15 runner-ups) ===
Result	Year	Tournament	Surface	Partner	Opponents	Score
Win	2011	Australian Open	Hard	(United Kingdom) Peter Norfolk	(United States) Nicholas Taylor (United States) David Wagner	6–3, 6–3
Win	2012	Australian Open (2)	Hard	(United Kingdom) Peter Norfolk	(United States) David Wagner (Israel) Noam Gershony	6–4, 6–2
Loss	2013	Australian Open	Hard	(Sweden) Anders Hard	(United States) David Wagner (United States) Nicholas Taylor	2–6, 3–6
Loss	2013	US Open	Hard	(South Africa) Lucas Sithole	(United States) Nicholas Taylor (United States) David Wagner	0–6, 6–2, 3–6
Win	2014	Australian Open (3)	Hard	(United States) David Wagner	(Australia) Dylan Alcott (South Africa) Lucas Sithole	6–4, 6–4
Loss	2014	US Open	Hard	(South Africa) Lucas Sithole	(United States) Nicholas Taylor (United States) David Wagner	3–6, 5–7
Win	2015	Australian Open (4)	Hard	(United States) David Wagner	(Australia) Dylan Alcott (South Africa) Lucas Sithole	6–0, 3–6, 6–2
Loss	2015	US Open	Hard	(Australia) Dylan Alcott	(United States) Nicholas Taylor (United States) David Wagner	6–4, 2–6, [7–10]
Loss	2016	Australian Open	Hard	(Australia) Dylan Alcott	(South Africa) Lucas Sithole (United States) David Wagner	1–6, 3–6
Win	2017	Australian Open (5)	Hard	(United States) David Wagner	(Australia) Dylan Alcott (Australia) Heath Davidson	6–3, 6–3
Win	2017	US Open	Hard	(United States) David Wagner	(Australia) Dylan Alcott (United States) Bryan Barten	7–5, 6–2
Loss	2018	Australian Open	Hard	(United States) David Wagner	(Australia) Dylan Alcott (Australia) Heath Davidson	0–6, 7–6^{(7–5)}, [6–10]
Win	2018	US Open (2)	Hard	(United States) David Wagner	(Australia) Dylan Alcott (United States) Bryan Barten	3–6, 6–0, [10–4]
Loss	2019	Australian Open	Hard	(United States) David Wagner	(Australia) Dylan Alcott (Australia) Heath Davidson	3–6, 7–6^{(8–6)}, [10–12]
Win	2019	Wimbledon	Grass	(Australia) Dylan Alcott	(Japan) Koji Sugeno (United States) David Wagner	6–2, 7–6^{(7–4)}
Win	2019	US Open (3)	Hard	(Australia) Dylan Alcott	(United States) Bryan Barten (United States) David Wagner	6–7^{(5–7)}, 6–1, [10–6]
Loss	2020	Australian Open	Hard	(United States) David Wagner	(Australia) Dylan Alcott (Australia) Heath Davidson	4–6, 3–6
Win	2020	US Open (4)	Hard	(Australia) Dylan Alcott	(Netherlands) Sam Schröder (United States) David Wagner	3–6, 6–4, [10–8]
Loss	2020	French Open	Clay	(Australia) Dylan Alcott	(Netherlands) Sam Schröder (United States) David Wagner	6–4, 5–7, [8–10]
Loss	2021	Australian Open	Hard	(United States) David Wagner	(Australia) Dylan Alcott (Australia) Heath Davidson	2–6, 6–3, [7–10]
Win	2021	French Open	Clay	(United States) David Wagner	(Australia) Dylan Alcott (Netherlands) Sam Schröder	7–6^{(7–1)}, 4–6, [10–7]
Win	2021	Wimbledon (2)	Grass	(United States) David Wagner	(Australia) Dylan Alcott (Netherlands) Sam Schröder	6–1, 3–6, 6–4
Win	2022	Australian Open (6)	Hard	(United States) David Wagner	(Netherlands) Niels Vink (Netherlands) Sam Schröder	2–6, 6–4, [10–7]
Loss	2022	Wimbledon	Grass	(United States) David Wagner	(Netherlands) Niels Vink (Netherlands) Sam Schröder	2–6, 6–4, [10–7]
Win	2023	French Open (2)	Clay	(South Africa) Donald Ramphadi	(Australia) Heath Davidson (Canada) Robert Shaw	1–6, 6–2, [10–3]
Loss	2023	US Open	Hard	(South Africa) Donald Ramphadi	(Netherlands) Sam Schroder (Netherlands) Niels Vink	1–6, 2–6
Win	2024	Australian Open (7)	Hard	(United States) David Wagner	(South Africa) Donald Ramphadi (Israel) Guy Sasson	6–4, 3–6, [10–2]
Loss	2024	French Open	Clay	(Israel) Guy Sasson	(Netherlands) Niels Vink (Netherlands) Sam Schröder	6–7^{(9–11)}, 1–6
Loss	2024	Wimbledon	Grass	(Israel) Guy Sasson	(Netherlands) Niels Vink (Netherlands) Sam Schröder	6–3, 6–7^{(3–7)}, 3–6
Win	2025	Australian Open (8)	Hard	(Netherlands) Sam Schröder	(Israel) Guy Sasson (Netherlands) Niels Vink	6–1, 6–4
Loss	2026	Australian Open	Hard	(Australia) Heath Davidson	(Israel) Guy Sasson (Netherlands) Niels Vink	3–6, 1–6

== Personal life ==
Lapthorne is an ambassador of Brentford F.C. He is a fan of West Ham United F.C. He lives in Eastcote, Greater London. He has a brother called Samuel.

Lapthorne was appointed Member of the Order of the British Empire (MBE) in the 2025 Birthday Honours for services to tennis.

== See also ==
- List of quad wheelchair tennis champions
