= Mitsuteru Moroishi =

Japanese wheelchair tennis player

- Residence: Kakamigahara, Japan
- Born: 11 April 1967 (age 58) Konan, Japan
Medal record
Men's wheelchair tennis
Representing Japan
Paralympic Games
Bronze medal – third place	2020 Tokyo	Quad doubles

Mitsuteru Moroishi (諸石光照, Moroishi Mitsuteru; born 11 April 1967) is a Japanese wheelchair tennis player. He represented Japan at the 2012 Summer Paralympics in quad singles and quad doubles and at the 2016 Summer Paralympics in quad singles and quad doubles. His doubles partner both years was Shota Kawano. At the 2020 Summer Paralympics, he and Koji Sugeno won bronze medals for Japan in the quad doubles event. Moroishi also finished 9th in the quad singles event. He was born in Konan and resides in Kakamigahara.
