= Francesc Tur =

Spanish wheelchair tennis player

Personal information
- Full name: Francesc Tur Blanch
- Nationality: Spanish
- Born: 31 January 1977 (age 49) Barcelona, Spain

Sport
- Country: Spain
- Sport: Wheelchair tennis

Francesc Tur Blanch (born 31 January 1977) is a wheelchair tennis player from Spain. He has competed in the men's single and doubles events representing Spain at the 2004, 2008 and 2012 Summer Paralympics. His top international singles world ranking was 19th, a rank he held in August 2010.

== Personal ==
Tur was born on 31 January 1977 in Barcelona, and is a paraplegic. He is from the Catalan region of Spain.

== Wheelchair tennis ==
Tur is left handed, and started playing tennis when he was 22 years old.

Tur competed at the 2004 Summer Paralympics. He played doubles with Mira Christian where the pair lost to a Polish doubles pair in the round of 32. He beat Laurent Fischer of France in the round of 64 before losing to Martin Legner of Austria in the round of 32. He competed in the 2006 Sarreguemines Open 2006. In July 2006, he was ranked twenty-fourth in the world in doubles tennis, his best ever world ranking in this event. He competed in the 2006 Israel Open. He competed in the 2006 Chile open. At the time, he was ranked 39th in the world. He competed in the Spanish national championships in 2006. He has also won the Wheelchair Tennis Lleida City Open after defeating Álvaro Illobre 6-0 and 6–1 in the final. At the time, he was ranked 50th internationally. He also won the doubles final playing with Illobre against the pair of Valera — Chamizo by 6-4 and 6–1.

Tur competed at the 2008 Summer Paralympics, losing to Japan players Shingo Kunieda and Satoshi Saida in the doubles event while playing with Illobre 6–1, 6–1. At the 2009 ITF 2 Series PTR/ROHO Championships, he lost to third seeded British player David Phillipson 6-1 and 6–1 in the semi-finals. In 2010, he was the top ranked Spanish male singles wheelchair tennis player. In August 2010, he had his best ever world ranking in singles tennis when he ranked nineteenth. In 2011, he won the Spanish national master's wheelchair tennis open. He won the event after defeating Daniel Caverzaschi 3–6, 6-3 and 10–4 at the Valencia Open. In June 2012, he played in an ATP event in Spain that included a wheelchair tennis exhibition.

At the 2012 Paralympic Games, Tur finished ninth in the doubles event and thirty-third in the singles event. He played doubles with Daniel Caverzaschi, defeating a Nigerean doubles team in the round of 32 before losing to a pair from Sweden. In September 2012, he was honored by the Alcobendas's townhall for his participation in the London Games.

He competed in wheelchair tennis at the 2020 Summer Paralympics.
