= Patrick Selepe =

South African wheelchair tennis player

- Country (sports): South Africa
- Plays: Right-handed (one-handed backhand)

Singles
- Highest ranking: No. 60 (May 2014)

Other tournaments

Doubles

Other doubles tournaments

Patrick Selepe is a South African wheelchair tennis player, coach, mentor, sports administrator and umpire. He is well known for his remarkable contributions to wheelchair tennis in South Africa and he is also regarded as one of the pioneers of wheelchair tennis in South Africa when it was introduced to the country in 2003. Patrick is also one of the founding members of the Wheelchair Tennis South Africa which was established in 2005. He also served as the national development officer of Wheelchair Tennis South Africa. He is the first disabled umpire to officiate in a wheelchair Paralympic event which he achieved at the 2020 Summer Paralympics.

== Biography ==
Patrick hails from Botlokva, Limpopo. He was diagnosed with bone cancer and his left leg was amputated above the knee in 1996 at the age of 19. He was still in the final year of his high school when his leg was amputated. He started using prosthetic leg. His wife died in 1998.

== Career ==
He took the sport of wheelchair basketball in his home province of Pretoria after finding a local para-sport initiative. He later developed an interest in athletics track and field events such as high jump, discus throw and javelin throw after being inspired by multiple Paralympic and world champion Fanie Lombaard. He could not afford to choose discus throw and javelin throw due to inability to find proper equipments and chose high jump since there wasn't a requirement for an equipment in that particular discipline.

He also rose to prominence after breaking South African national para high jump record of 1.52m. However, he later became interested in wheelchair tennis when the sport was introduced to the country in 2002. He obtained Level I beginners coaching certificate in wheelchair tennis and initially focused only on coaching but later went onto play the sport at international level. He played an instrumental role in founding the WTSA in 2005. In May 2014, he achieved his highest career UNIQLO wheelchair tennis world tour ranking of 60. He became the first disabled person in tennis history to earn an ITF White Badge officiating qualification which he achieved it in 2015. He also served as an umpire in a Wimbledon qualifying tournament. He also announced his retirement from playing the sport in January 2016 after winning the men's doubles event at the 2016 Mauritius Wheelchair Tennis Open.

In 2017, he also set another milestone by becoming the first ever wheelchair umpire to officiate in a Davis Cup tie in South Africa. He officiated in a BNP Paribas tie between South Africa and Estonia during the 2017 Davis Cup. In 2017, he was adjudged as the inaugural winner of the UNIQLO Spirit Award which was awarded by the International Tennis Federation during the final day of the 2017 Wheelchair Doubles Masters.

During the 2020 Summer Paralympics, he became the first person with a disability to serve as an official in a wheelchair Paralympic competition.
