= Marc McCarroll =

British wheelchair tennis player

Marc McCarroll (born 19 February 1985) is a Harrow-born British wheelchair tennis player who won the British Open in 2014.

== Early life ==
McCarroll was born to a family of athletes. In 2003, he was injured in a car accident and two years later took up wheelchair tennis. Prior to the accident he was a semi-professional footballer. He is a supporter of Arsenal F.C.

== Career ==
In 2012, he won against Gordon Reid at South African Open in three sets: 4–6, 6–2, 6–3.

In 2014 while playing doubles along with Kanako Domori of Japan, he won the 2014 Wimbledon Championship. Previously, he defeated another Japanese player named Takuya Miki. Currently, he is scheduled to play against Shingo Kunieda, another player from the same country.
