= Tom Egberink =

Dutch wheelchair tennis player

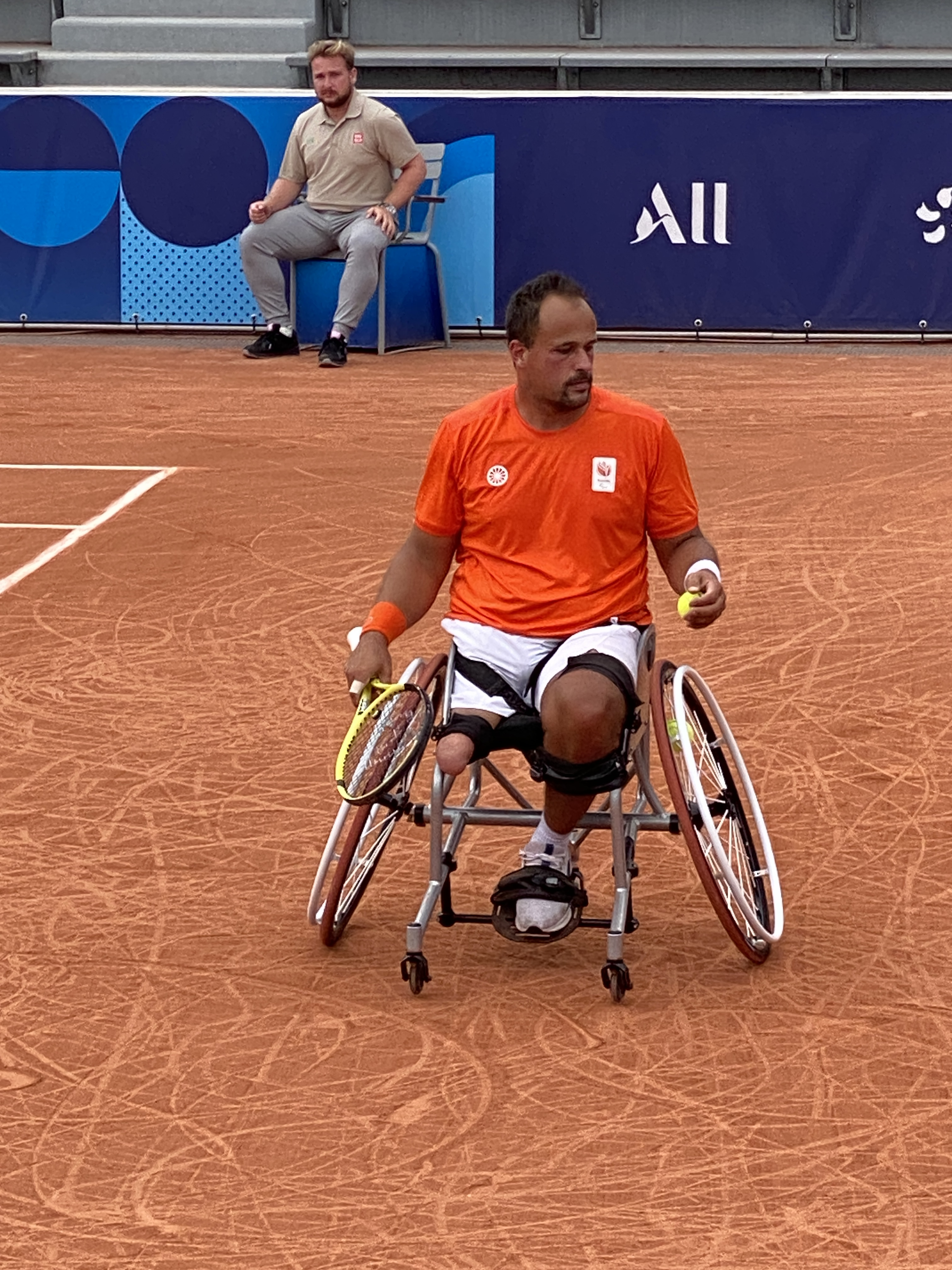
- Egberink at the 2024 Summer Paralympics
- Country (sports): Netherlands
- Born: 22 December 1992 (age 33) Hardenberg, Netherlands

Grand Slam singles results
- Australian Open: SF (2022)
- French Open: QF (2022, 2024)
- Wimbledon: QF (2021, 2022)
- US Open: QF (2021, 2022)

Other tournaments
- Paralympic Games: Silver Medal (2020)

Grand Slam doubles results
- Australian Open: SF (2022, 2023, 2025)
- French Open: QF (2022, 2023, 2024)
- Wimbledon: W (2012)
- US Open: SF (2021, 2022)

Other doubles tournaments
- Paralympic Games: Bronze Medal (2020)
Medal record
Men's wheelchair tennis
Representing Netherlands
Paralympic Games
Silver medal – second place	2020 Tokyo	Men's singles
Bronze medal – third place	2020 Tokyo	Men's doubles

Tom Egberink (born 22 December 1992) is a Dutch wheelchair tennis player. Egberink is a major champion, having won the 2012 Wimbledon Championships in doubles, and a two-time Paralympic medalist, with a silver and bronze from singles and doubles, respectively, at the 2020 Tokyo Paralympics.

== Match highlights ==
On the 2012 Wimbledon Championships he played doubles with Michaël Jérémiasz of France against two-time Wimbledon champions Robin Ammerlaan and Ronald Vink, both of whom were from the Netherlands as well. The match started with a 5–2 lead which ended with 6–4 due to the opponents' errors. The second set brought even more victory for Egberink and Jeremiasz with the score of 2–1. The rain got in a way when they were 40–0 in the fourth game. The game resumed an hour later. In the second set the Dutch duo was unable to control forehands resulting in 6–2 win for Tom and Michael in the second set.
