= France at the 2016 Summer Paralympics =

- IPC code: FRA
- NPC: French Paralympic and Sports Committee
- Website: france-paralympique.fr

in Rio de Janeiro
- Competitors: 126 in 17 sports
- Flag bearer: Michaël Jérémiasz
- Medals Ranked 12th: Gold 9 Silver 5 Bronze 14 Total 28

Summer Paralympics appearances (overview)
- 1960; 1964; 1968; 1972; 1976; 1980; 1984; 1988; 1992; 1996; 2000; 2004; 2008; 2012; 2016; 2020; 2024

France competed at the 2016 Summer Paralympics in Rio de Janeiro, Brazil, from 7 September to 18 September 2016. The first places the team qualified were for four athletes in sailing events.

== Disability classifications ==
Every participant at the Paralympics has their disability grouped into one of five disability categories; amputation, the condition may be congenital or sustained through injury or illness; cerebral palsy; wheelchair athletes, there is often overlap between this and other categories; visual impairment, including blindness; Les autres, any physical disability that does not fall strictly under one of the other categories, for example dwarfism or multiple sclerosis. Each Paralympic sport then has its own classifications, dependent upon the specific physical demands of competition. Events are given a code, made of numbers and letters, describing the type of event and classification of the athletes competing. Some sports, such as athletics, divide athletes by both the category and severity of their disabilities, other sports, for example swimming, group competitors from different categories together, the only separation being based on the severity of the disability.

== Medalists ==
Medal	Name	Sport	Event
Gold	Nantenin Keïta	Athletics	Women's 400m T13
Gold	Marie-Amelie Le Fur	Athletics	Women's 400m T44
Gold	Marie-Amelie Le Fur	Athletics	Women's long jump T44
Gold	Sandrine Martinet	Judo	Women's -52kg
Gold	Damien Seguin	Sailing	Norlin Mark 3 / 2.4m
Gold	Fabien Lamirault	Table tennis	Men's singles class 2
Gold	Fabien Lamirault; Stephane Molliens; Jean-François Ducay	Table tennis	Men's team class 1–2
Gold	Robert Citerne; Yannick Ifebe; Romain Noble	Wheelchair fencing	Men's team épée
Gold	Stéphane Houdet; Nicolas Peifer	Wheelchair tennis	Men's doubles
Silver	Pierre Fairbank	Athletics	Men's 800m T53
Silver	Mandy Francois-Elie	Athletics	Women's 100m T37
Silver	Souhad Ghazouani	Athletics	Women's -73kg
Silver	David Smétanine	Swimming	Men's 50m freestyle S4
Silver	Thu Kamkasomphou	Table tennis	Women's singles class 8
Bronze	Pierre Fairbank	Athletics	Men's 400m T54
Bronze	Louis Radius	Athletics	Men's 1500m T38
Bronze	Arnaud Assoumani	Athletics	Men's long jump T47
Bronze	Marie-Amelie Le Fur	Athletics	Women's 200m T44
Bronze	Joël Jeannot	Cycling	Men's road race H4
Bronze	Cindy Moreau	Paracanoeing	Women's KL3
Bronze	Gwladys Lemoussu	Paratriathlon	Women's individual PT4
Bronze	Perle Bouge; Stephane Tardieu	Rowing	Mixed double sculls
Bronze	Élodie Lorandi	Swimming	Women's 100m freestyle S10
Bronze	Élodie Lorandi	Swimming	Women's 400m freestyle S10
Bronze	Florian Merrien	Table tennis	Men's singles class 3
Bronze	Maxime Thomas	Table tennis	Men's singles class 4
Bronze	Maxime Valet	Wheelchair fencing	Men's foil B
Bronze	Ludovic Lemoine; Damien Tokatlian; Maxime Valet	Wheelchair fencing	Men's team foil

== Archery ==
Eric Pereira earned France a spot at the Rio Games following his performance at the 2015 World Archery Para Championships. He qualified the country in the compound men's open event. Brigitte Duboc earned France a second spot, with her performance in the recurve women's open event.

== Cycling ==
With one pathway for qualification being one highest ranked NPCs on the UCI Para-Cycling male and female Nations Ranking Lists on 31 December 2014, France qualified for the 2016 Summer Paralympics in Rio, assuming they continued to meet all other eligibility requirements.

== Equestrian ==
The country earned an individual slot via the Para Equestrian Individual Ranking List Allocation method.

== Paracanoeing ==
France earned a qualifying spot at the 2016 Summer Paralympics in this sport following their performance at the 2015 ICF Canoe Sprint & Paracanoe World Championships in Milan, Italy where the top six finishers in each Paralympic event earned a qualifying spot for their nation. Agnès Lacheux earned the spot for France after finishing sixth in the women's KL1 event. Cindy Moreau earned a second spot for France after finishing third in the women's KL3 event.

== Rowing ==
One pathway for qualifying for Rio involved having a boat have top eight finish at the 2015 FISA World Rowing Championships in a medal event. France qualified for the 2016 Games under this criterion in the TA Mixed Double Sculls event with a third-place finish in a time of 04:06.080. France qualified a second boat with an eighth-place finish in the LTA Mixed Coxed Four event in a time of 03:32.590, thirteen seconds behind first-place finisher, Great Britain, who had a time of 03:19.560.

== Sailing ==
France qualified a boat for two of the three sailing classes at the Games through their results at the 2014 Disabled Sailing World Championships held in Halifax, Nova Scotia, Canada. Places were earned in the solo 2.4mR event and a crew also qualified for the three-person Sonar class.

== Shooting ==
The first opportunity to qualify for shooting at the Rio Games took place at the 2014 IPC Shooting World Championships in Suhl. Shooters earned spots for their NPC. France earned a spot at this competition in the R4 – 10m Air Rifle Standing Mixed SH2 event as a result of the performance of Tanguy De La Forest. In the R7 – 50m Rifle 3 Positions Men SH1, Didier Richard gave France their second spot.

The country sent shooters to 2015 IPC Shooting World Cup in Osijek, Croatia, where Rio direct qualification was also available. They earned a qualifying spot at this event based on the performance of Christophe Tanche in the R3 – 10m Air Rifle Prone Mixed SH1 event.

The last direct qualifying event for Rio in shooting took place at the 2015 IPC Shooting World Cup in Fort Benning in November. Cédric Fèvre-Chevalier earned a qualifying spot for their country at this competition in the R6 Mixed 50m Rifle Prone SH1 event.

== Swimming ==
The top two finishers in each Rio medal event at the 2015 IPC Swimming World Championships earned a qualifying spot for their country for Rio. Charles Rozoy earned France a spot after winning silver in the Men's 100m Butterfly S8.

== Wheelchair basketball ==
The France women's national wheelchair basketball team qualified for the 2016 Rio Paralympics.

As hosts, Brazil got to choose which group they were put into. They were partnered with Algeria, who would be put in the group they did not choose. Brazil chose Group A, which included Canada, Germany, Great Britain and Argentina. Algeria ended up in Group B with the United States, the Netherlands, France and China.

Pos	Team	Pld	W	L	PF	PA	PD	Pts	Qualification
1	United States	4	4	0	288	138	+150	8	Quarter-finals
2	Netherlands	4	3	1	300	148	+152	7	Quarter-finals
3	China	4	2	2	212	187	+25	6	Quarter-finals
4	France	4	1	3	178	266	−88	5	Quarter-finals
5	Algeria	4	0	4	93	332	−239	4	9th/10th place playoff

Source: Paralympic.org
Rules for classification: 1) Points; 2) Head-to-head results; 3) Points difference; 4) Points scored.

== Wheelchair rugby ==
France qualified for the Rio Paralympics. They were scheduled to open play in Rio against the United States on September 14. Their second game was scheduled to be against Japan on September 15. Their final game of group play as against Sweden on September 16. France entered the tournament ranked number seven in the world.

Pos	Team	Pld	W	D	L	GF	GA	GD	Pts	Qualification
1	United States	3	3	0	0	165	142	+23	6	Semi-finals
2	Japan	3	2	0	1	163	155	+8	4	Semi-finals
3	Sweden	3	1	0	2	145	151	−6	2	Fifth place Match
4	France	3	0	0	3	141	166	−25	0	Seventh place Match

Source: Rio2016
14 September 2016
12:45

United States	51–42	France
	Report

Carioca Arena 1, Rio de Janeiro
Referee: Jean Choiniere, Liam Costello

15 September 2016
16:00

Japan	57–52	France
	Report

Carioca Arena 1, Rio de Janeiro
Referee: Brian Ward, Pierre-Alexandre Briere

16 September 2016
10:30

France	47–55	Sweden
	Report

Carioca Arena 1, Rio de Janeiro
Referee: Mitch Carr, Jean Choiniere

Seventh-place match

17 September 2016
10:30

Brazil	54–59	France
	Report

Carioca Arena 1, Rio de Janeiro
Referee: Perre-Alexandre Briere, Brian Ward

== Wheelchair tennis ==
France qualified four competitors in the men's single event, Frédéric Cattanéo, Stéphane Houdet, Michaël Jérémiasz and Nicolas Peifer. France qualified two players in the women's singles event. Charlotte Famin qualified via the standard route. Charlotte Famin earned her slot via a Bipartite Commission Invitation place.

== See also ==
- France at the 2016 Summer Olympics
