= South Africa at the 2016 Summer Paralympics =

- IPC code: RSA
- NPC: South African Sports Confederation and Olympic Committee
- Website: www.sascoc.co.za

in Rio de Janeiro
- Competitors: 45 in 10 sports
- Flag bearers: Zanele Situ (opening); Fanie van der Merwe (closing)
- Medals Ranked 22nd: Gold 7 Silver 6 Bronze 4 Total 17

Summer Paralympics appearances (overview)
- 1964; 1968; 1972; 1976; 1980–1988; 1992; 1996; 2000; 2004; 2008; 2012; 2016; 2020; 2024

South Africa entered 45 athletes in the 2016 Summer Paralympics in Rio de Janeiro from 7–18 September 2016. The country qualified athletes in archery, athletics, canoeing, cycling, equestrian, powerlifting, rowing, swimming, shooting and wheelchair tennis.

== Funding and support ==
In September 2015, a representative from the country attended the Rio 2016 Paralympic Games Chef de Mission seminar as part of the country's preparation efforts for the 2016 Games.

For some South African sportspeople trying to qualify for Rio, the funding had to come out of their own pocket. This was the case for three-time equestrian Paralympian Philippa Johnson. There is a particular challenge with equestrian sport because, unlike able-bodied riders, para-riders do not get prize money at major international events. This despite the fact the sport has higher costs for participants with a disability. SASOC's Operation Excellence (OPEX) does exist and for some South African Paralympians, it provides four years worth of support going into each new Paralympic cycle. 32% of the funded sportspeople in the program are para-sportspeople.

== Medals ==
The South African team won a total of seventeen medals; seven gold, six silver and four bronze.

Medal	Name	Sport	Event
Gold	Kevin Paul	Swimming	Men's 100m Breaststroke - SB9
Gold	Hilton Langenhoven	Athletics	Men's Long Jump - T12
Gold	Charl du Toit	Athletics	Men's 400m - T37
Gold	Charl du Toit	Athletics	Men's 100m - T37
Gold	Ernst van Dyk	Cycling	Men's Road Race - H5
Gold	Reinhardt Hamman	Athletics	Men's 400m - T38
Gold	Dyan Buis	Athletics	Men's 400m - T38
Silver	Ilse Hayes	Athletics	Women's 100m - T13
Silver	Ilse Hayes	Athletics	Women's 400m - T13
Silver	Ntando Mahlangu	Athletics	Men's 200m - T42
Silver	Anrune Liebenberg	Athletics	Women's 400m - T47
Silver	Jonathan Ntutu	Athletics	Men's 100m - T12
Silver	Hilton Langenhoven	Athletics	Men's 200m - T12
Bronze	Fanie van der Merwe	Athletics	Men's 100m - T37
Bronze	Tyrone Pillay	Athletics	Men's Shot Put - T42
Bronze	Zanele Situ	Athletics	Women's Javelin Throw - F54
Bronze	Dyan Buis	Athletics	Men's Long Jump - T38

== Archery ==
South Africa qualified one archer for the Rio Games following their performance at the 2015 World Archery Para Championships. Stephanus Lombaard earned the spot in the men's compound open after defeating sixth seeded Swiss archer Martin Imboden.

== Athletics ==
The athletics squad consists of seven women and thirteen men:

Women

Ilse Hayes, Louzanne Coetzee, Liezel Gouws, Anrune Liebenberg, Zandile Nhlapo, Zanele Situ, Chenelle Van Zyl

Men

Dyan Buis, Charl Du Toit, Arnu Fourie, Reinhardt Hamman, Hilton Langenhoven, Ntando Mahlangu, Mpumelelo Mhlongo, Jonathan Ntutu, Tyrone Pillay, Union Sekailwe, Fanie van der Merwe, Ernst van Dyk, Khothatso Mokone (Guide)

Managers and coaches

Suzanne Ferreira, Karin Le Roux, Daniel Damon, Raymond Julius, Neels Matthyser

== Cycling ==
With one pathway for qualification being one highest ranked NPCs on the UCI Para-Cycling male and female Nations Ranking Lists on 31 December 2014, South Africa qualified for the 2016 Summer Paralympics in Rio, assuming they continued to meet all other eligibility requirements.

== Equestrian ==
A single competitor, Philippa Johnson returns to the Paralympics for the third time. She is supported by groom Mieke Wirix and coach Christiaan Haazen.

== Paracanoeing ==
South Africa earned a qualifying spot at the 2016 Summer Paralympics in this sport following their performance at the 2015 ICF Canoe Sprint & Paracanoe World Championships in Milan, Italy where the top six finishers in each Paralympic event earned a qualifying spot for their nation. Graham Paull earned the spot for South Africa after finishing fifth in the men's KL1 event.

== Powerlifting ==
One woman, Chantelle Stierman has been entered in the powerlifting event, her manager/coach is Andrew Ludik.

== Rowing ==
One pathway for qualifying for Rio involved having a boat have top eight finish at the 2015 FISA World Rowing Championships in a medal event. South Africa qualified for the Rio 2016 under this criterion in the AS Women's Single Sculls event with a seventh-place finish in a time of 05:48.890. South Africa qualified a second boat with a fifth-place finish in the LTA Mixed Coxed Four event in a time of 03:31.830, twelve seconds behind first-place finisher, Great Britain, who had a time of 03:19.560.

== Shooting ==
The last direct qualifying event for Rio in shooting took place at the 2015 IPC Shooting World Cup in Fort Benning in November. Zenuer von Kohne earned a qualifying spot for South Africa at this competition in the P3 Mixed 25m Pistol SH1 event.

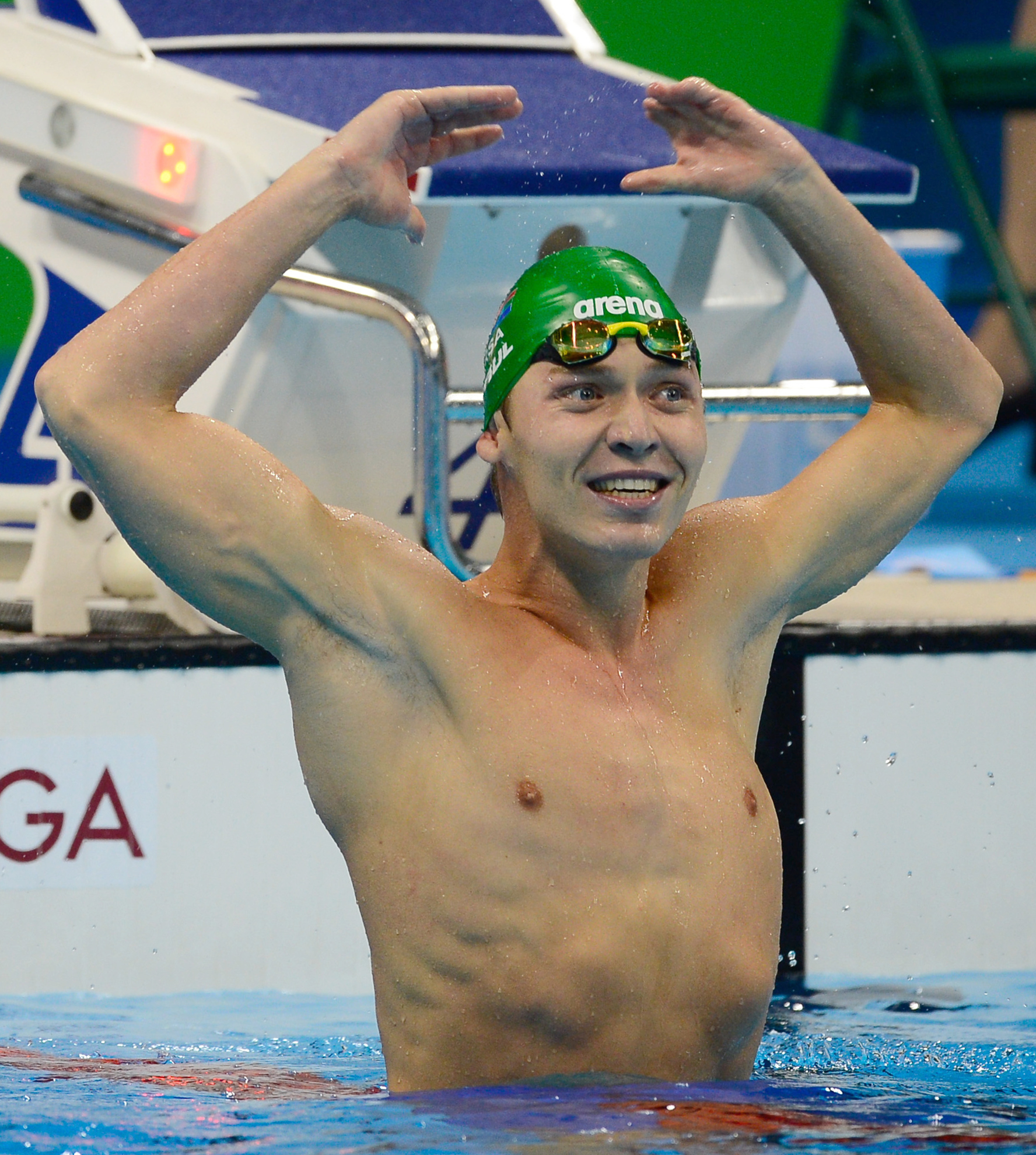
Kevin Paul at the 2016 Summer Paralympics

== Swimming ==
South African swimmers competed at the 2015 IPC Swimming World Championships as part of their Rio qualifying efforts. Hendri Herbst was one swimmer who set an A-Qualifying time at the event. The blind swimmer from Worcester, Western Cape qualified in the men's S11 100-metre with a time of 1:00.35. Beth Nothling also qualified for Rio 2016 with an A-Qualifying time of 55.92 in the S5 50m backstroke event. Emily Gray also qualified for Rio 2016 in the S9 100m backstroke event after a 7th place in the final in a time of 1:16.27.

== Wheelchair tennis ==
The wheelchair tennis squad consists of one woman, Kgothatso Montjane and three men, Leon Els, Lucas Sithole and Evans Maripa. The coaching staff are Khotso Matshego and Holger Losch. Wheelchair Tennis South Africa held a send off ceremony for the tennis delegation on 16 August in Johannesburg.

== See also ==
- South Africa at the 2016 Summer Olympics
