= Olympic Tennis Centre (Rio de Janeiro) =

Sports venue in Rio de Janeiro, Brazil

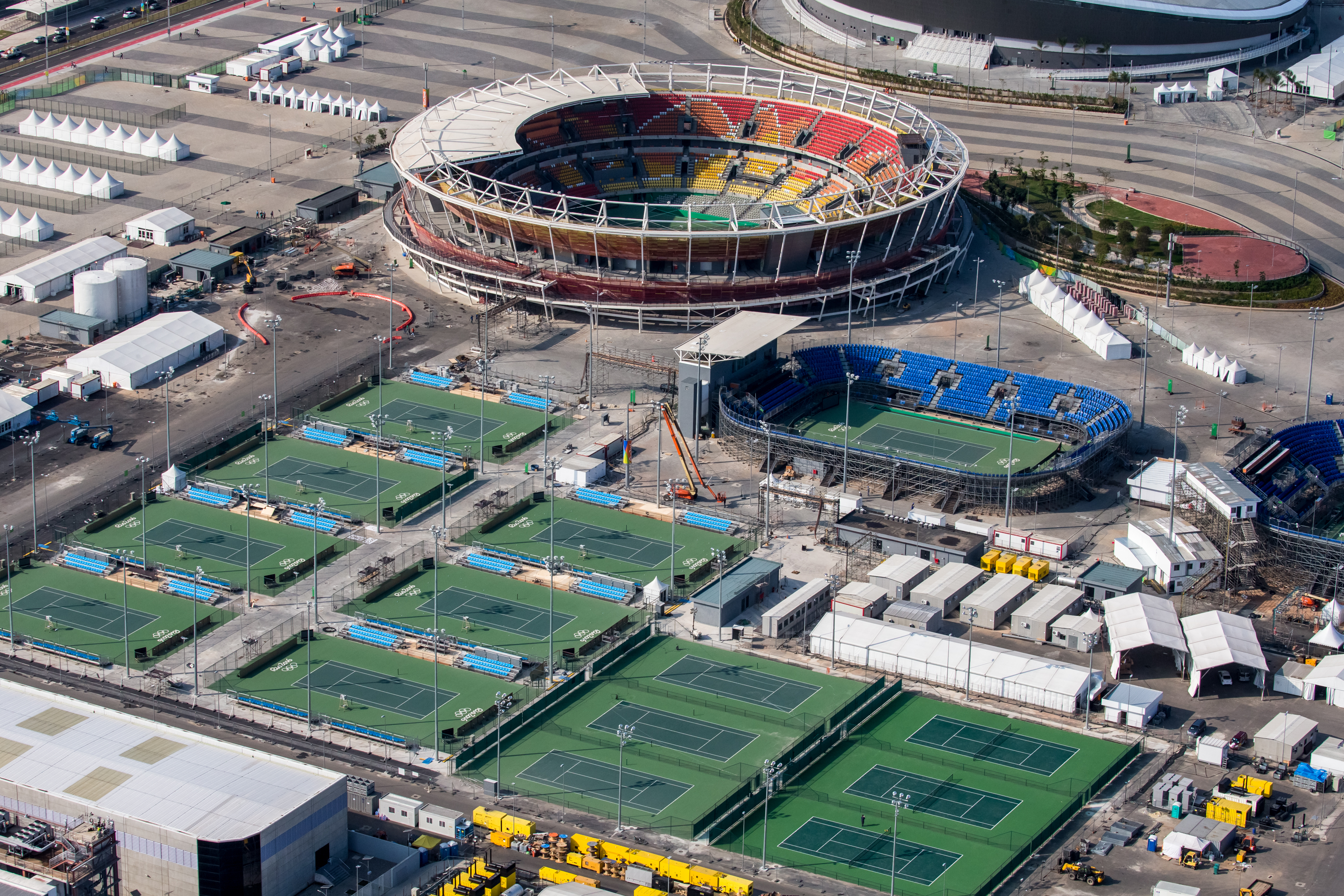
- Interactive map of Olympic Tennis Centre
- Location: Barra da Tijuca, Rio de Janeiro, Brazil
- Coordinates: 22.978822°S 43.396382°W
- Capacity: 18,000 total for the three show courts 10,000 (Maria Esther Bueno Court); 5,000 (Show Court 1); 3,000 (Show Court 2); 250 (Match Courts)
- Surface: Hard (GreenSet Grand Prix Cushion)

Construction
- Groundbreaking: 2013
- Opened: 2015
- Cost: R$162.8m
- Architects: Gerkan, Marg and Partners; Schlaich Bergermann Partner

Tenants
- Tennis events for the 2016 Summer Olympics, and wheelchair tennis events for the 2016 Summer Paralympics

The Olympic Tennis Centre (Portuguese: Centro Olímpico de Tênis) is a tennis venue located in the Barra Olympic Park in Barra da Tijuca in the West Zone of Rio de Janeiro, Brazil. The centre hosted tennis events of the 2016 Summer Olympics, and the wheelchair tennis events of the 2016 Summer Paralympics. The centre was built on the site of the former Nelson Piquet International Autodrome.

== History ==
=== Construction ===
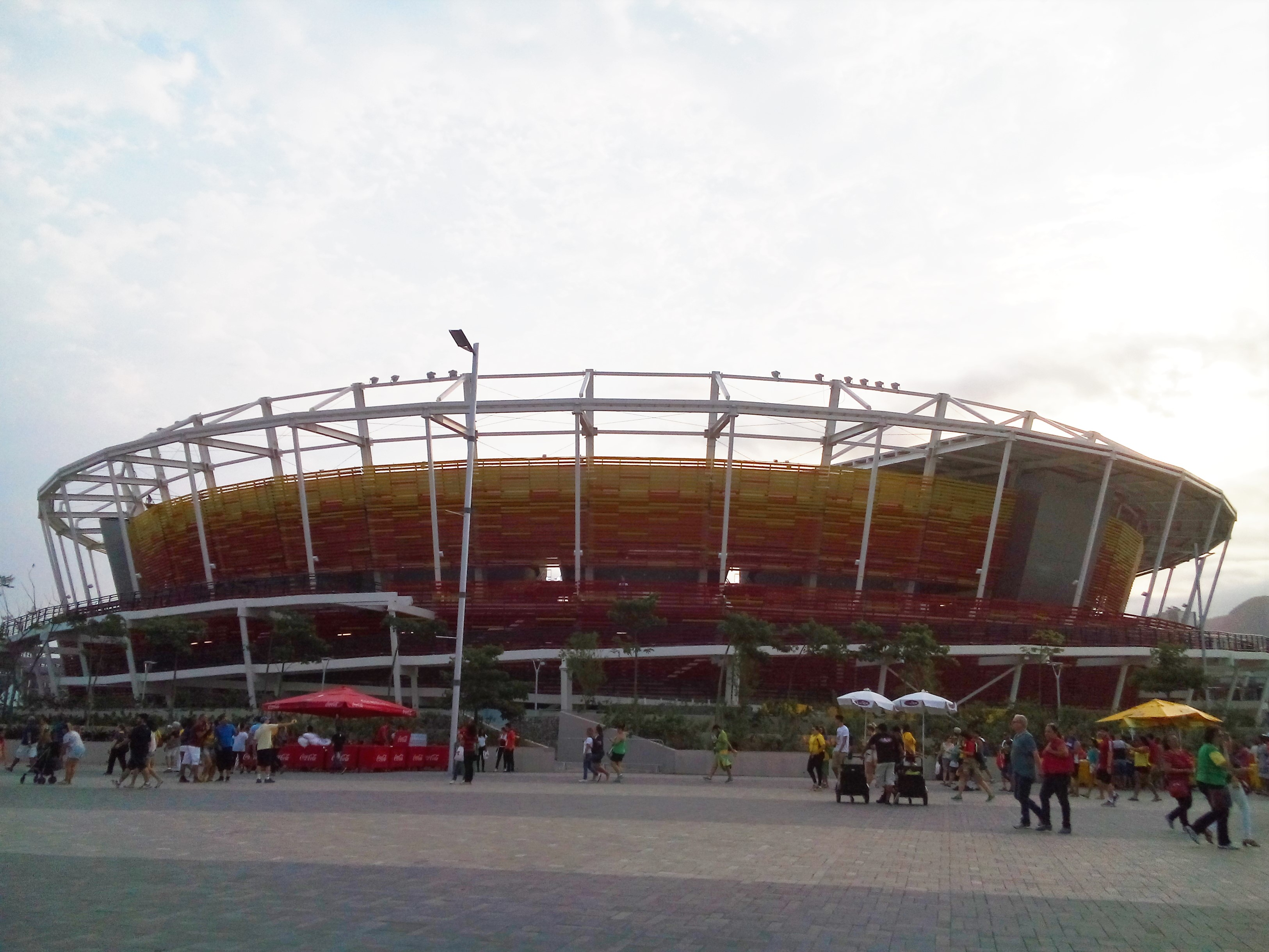
Ground view of the Olympic Tennis Center

The centre was designed by architect Gerkan, Marg and Partners, along with Schlaich Bergermann Partner.

The centre consists of a tennis stadium and 15 ancillary courts. The center court has a capacity of 10,000, with the two temporary arenas with a capacity of 5,000 and 3,000 respectively. The surface will be hard court, supplied by GreenSet.

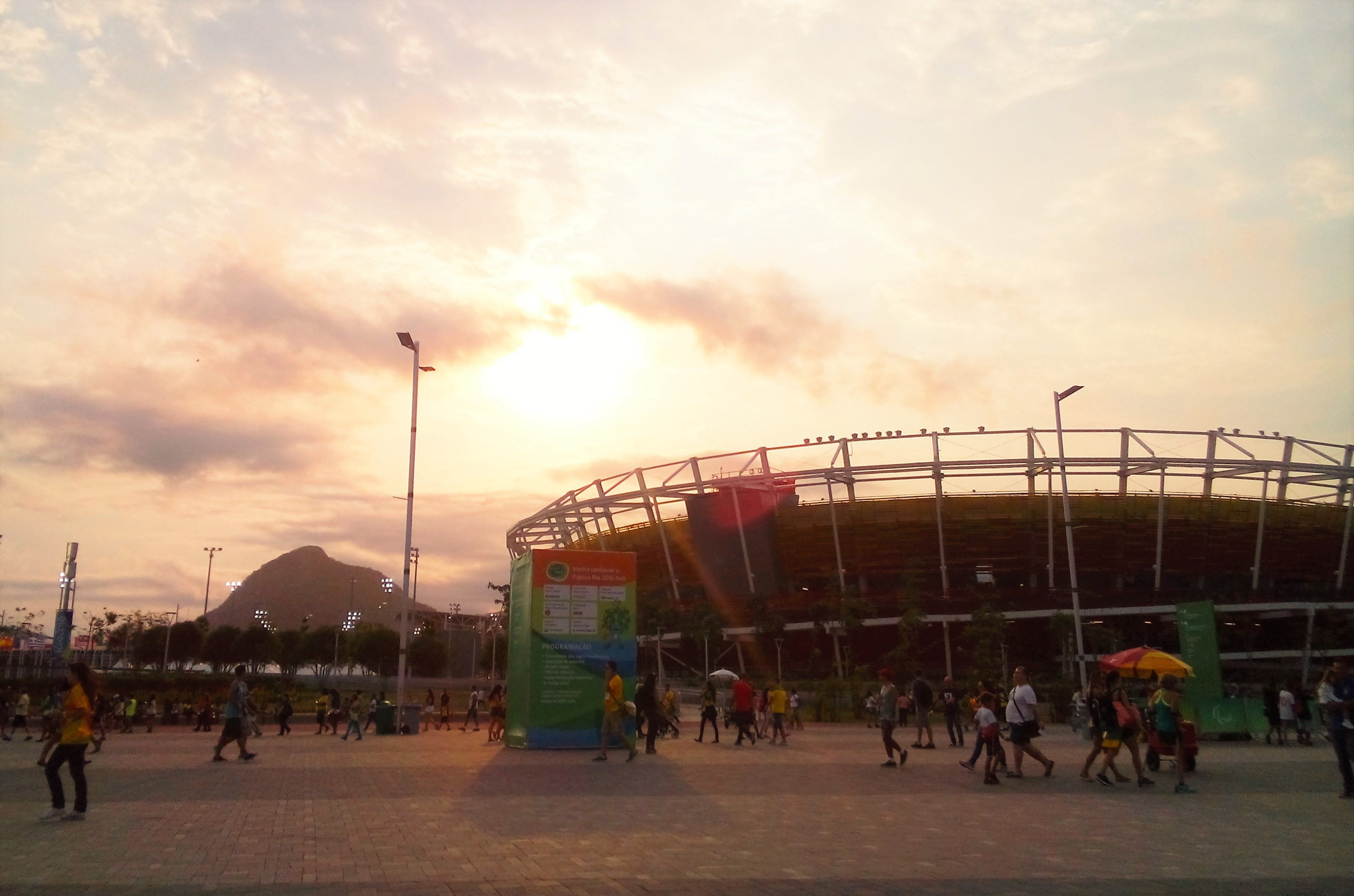
Olympic Tennis Centre during sunset

Construction started in 2013 and was completed in 2016. However, the stadium faced numerous hurdles during construction. The biggest of these was when the city of Rio de Janeiro canceled the construction contract 200 days before the start of the games and finned the consortium responsible for delays 11 million reais ($2.7 million).

=== Opening ===
In December 2015, the centre court was named after Maria Esther Bueno, a former Brazilian tennis player, who became the first woman ever to win all four Grand Slam doubles titles in one year. This also marked the first ever event to be held at the Barra Olympic Park, which saw 75 Brazilian tennis players take part in a competition.

=== Legacy ===
The first events held at the Olympic Tennis Center after the Olympic Games were beach volleyball competitions. In February 2017, the central court was filled with 210 tons of sand to host the Gigantes da Praia, a one-day event. In May, the venue hosted the Brazilian leg of the FIVB Beach Volleyball World Tour, which utilized the central court and five external courts.

In July 2021, it was announced that the centre would be auctioned to the private initiative. However, as of August 2024, it is still managed by the federal government, through the Ministry of Sports.

The International Tennis Federation (ITF) has confirmed that, 20 years after the last Davis Cup match played in Rio de Janeiro, the Olympics Tennis Centre is set to host Brazil's match against Germany in the 2022 Davis Cup qualifying round. It also played host to the Rio Tennis Classic ATP Challenger Tour event in December 2021.

In 2023, Mayor Eduardo Paes, in an interview with the Cartolouco youtube channel, highlighted that, although the Main Court is one of the best-preserved facilities, the arena is underutilized, with no regular athlete training projects or frequent use by the population, emphasizing that the responsibility for management lies with the federal government and sports confederations. According to Rodrigo Gouveia, a representative of the Ministry of Sports, the legislation prevents the concession of the space to private companies, which limits the options for its use. Discussions about transforming the arena into a space for eSports events, covering the existing structure, are still on the agenda. However, the attempt to hold competitions such as the Rio Open was once again frustrated due to the incompatibility of the floor with the requirements of the tournament, which takes place on clay courts.

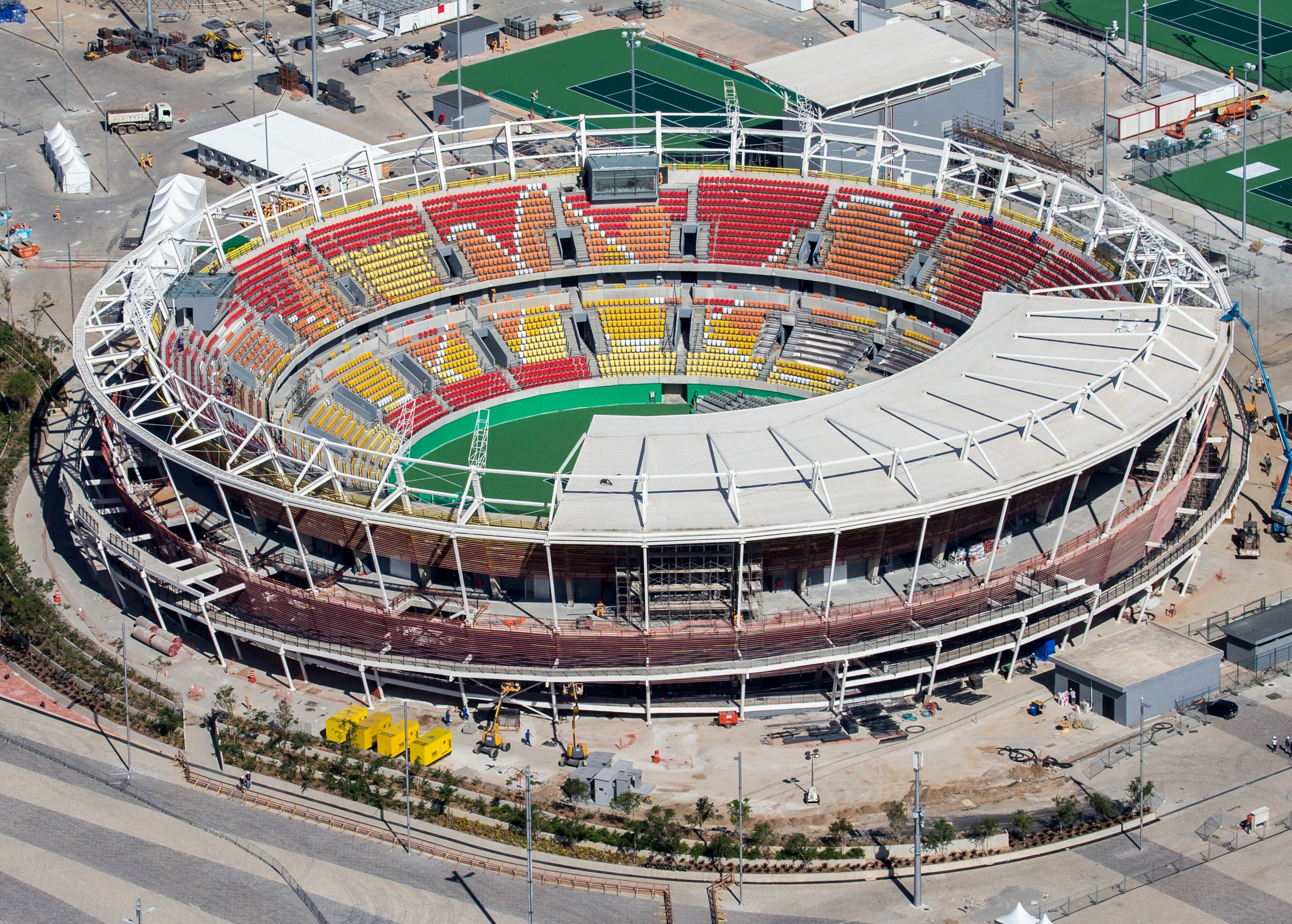
Aerial view of the Olympic Tennis Centre

== See also ==
- Barra Olympic Park
