= 2019 Australian Open – Men's singles qualifying =

Men's singles qualifying
- 2019 Australian Open

Events
Singles	men	women		boys	girls
Doubles	men	women	mixed	boys	girls
WC Singles	men	women	quad
WC Doubles	men	women	quad
Legends	men	women	mixed

Qualification
Singles	men	women
- Australian Open

This article displays the qualifying draw for men's singles at the 2019 Australian Open.

== Seeds ==
1. (Italy) Lorenzo Sonego (qualifying competition)
2. (Canada) Félix Auger-Aliassime (second round)
3. (Lithuania) Ričardas Berankis (second round)
4. (Italy) Paolo Lorenzi (qualifying competition)
5. (Norway) Casper Ruud (first round)
6. (India) Prajnesh Gunneswaran (qualified)
7. (Slovakia) Lukáš Lacko (first round)
8. (Belgium) Ruben Bemelmans (first round)
9. (Argentina) Juan Ignacio Londero (second round)
10. (Canada) Peter Polansky (qualifying competition)
11. (South Africa) Lloyd Harris (qualified)
12. (Chinese Taipei) Jason Jung (second round)
13. (Argentina) Marco Trungelliti (qualifying competition)
14. (Cyprus) Marcos Baghdatis (first round)
15. (Germany) Yannick Maden (first round)
16. (Serbia) Miomir Kecmanović (qualified)
17. (Brazil) Thiago Monteiro (qualifying competition)
18. (France) Quentin Halys (first round)
19. (Germany) Matthias Bachinger (second round)
20. (Spain) Adrián Menéndez Maceiras (second round)
21. (India) Ramkumar Ramanathan (second round)
22. (Ukraine) Sergiy Stakhovsky (second round)
23. (Brazil) Rogério Dutra Silva (first round)
24. (United States) Bjorn Fratangelo (qualified)
25. (Italy) Simone Bolelli (first round)
26. (Argentina) Carlos Berlocq (first round)
27. (Italy) Stefano Travaglia (qualified)
28. (United States) Noah Rubin (second round)
29. (Austria) Dennis Novak (first round)
30. (France) Constant Lestienne (first round)
31. (Czech Republic) Lukáš Rosol (second round)
32. (Australia) Thanasi Kokkinakis (qualified)

== Qualifiers ==
1. (Japan) Tatsuma Ito
2. (United States) Christopher Eubanks
3. (United States) Bjorn Fratangelo
4. (United Kingdom) Dan Evans
5. (Switzerland) Henri Laaksonen
6. (India) Prajnesh Gunneswaran
7. (France) Gleb Sakharov
8. (Italy) Stefano Travaglia
9. (Germany) Rudolf Molleker
10. (Australia) Thanasi Kokkinakis
11. (South Africa) Lloyd Harris
12. (Italy) Luca Vanni
13. (United States) Mitchell Krueger
14. (Serbia) Viktor Troicki
15. (Poland) Kamil Majchrzak
16. (Serbia) Miomir Kecmanović

== Draw ==
=== First qualifier ===
First round
1	(Italy) Lorenzo Sonego	6	6
(United Kingdom) Jay Clarke	2	3
(Italy) Lorenzo Giustino	6^{1}	6	4
(Japan) Yūichi Sugita	7^{7}	2	6
(France) Stéphane Robert	4	6^{4}
(Spain) Nicola Kuhn	6	7^{7}
(Japan) Tatsuma Ito	6	3	6
25	(Italy) Simone Bolelli	3	6	3

Second round
1	(Italy) Lorenzo Sonego	6	6
(Japan) Yūichi Sugita	1	2
(Spain) Nicola Kuhn	3	3
(Japan) Tatsuma Ito	6	6

Qualifying competition
1	(Italy) Lorenzo Sonego	6^{6}	6	6^{3}
(Japan) Tatsuma Ito	7^{8}	0	7^{10}

=== Second qualifier ===
First round
2	(Canada) Félix Auger-Aliassime	6	7^{7}
(Belgium) Arthur De Greef	2	6^{1}
(United States) Christopher Eubanks	2	6	6
(France) Corentin Moutet	6	1	4
(Italy) Andrea Arnaboldi	3	3
(Spain) Pedro Martínez	6	6
(Kazakhstan) Aleksandr Nedovyesov	7^{7}	6
29	(Austria) Dennis Novak	6^{3}	0

Second round
2	(Canada) Félix Auger-Aliassime	6^{4}	3
(United States) Christopher Eubanks	7^{7}	6
(Spain) Pedro Martínez	4	7^{7}	6
(Kazakhstan) Aleksandr Nedovyesov	6	6^{4}	1

Qualifying competition
(United States) Christopher Eubanks	6	6
(Spain) Pedro Martínez	3	3

=== Third qualifier ===
First round
3	(Lithuania) Ričardas Berankis	6	6
WC	(Australia) Max Purcell	1	2
(China) Zhang Ze	7^{8}	6
(Germany) Daniel Brands	6^{6}	1
(Italy) Stefano Napolitano	6	7^{7}
(Italy) Matteo Donati	4	6^{4}
(Netherlands) Tallon Griekspoor	4	5
24	(United States) Bjorn Fratangelo	6	7

Second round
3	(Lithuania) Ričardas Berankis	6	2	3
(China) Zhang Ze	2	6	6
(Italy) Stefano Napolitano	6	3	6^{4}
24	(United States) Bjorn Fratangelo	4	6	7^{10}

Qualifying competition
(China) Zhang Ze	7^{7}	6^{1}	1
24	(United States) Bjorn Fratangelo	6^{4}	7^{7}	6

=== Fourth qualifier ===
First round
4	(Italy) Paolo Lorenzi	6	6
(Colombia) Daniel Elahi Galán	4	2
(United States) Tommy Paul	6	6
(Dominican Republic) Roberto Cid Subervi	4	3
(Kazakhstan) Alexander Bublik	5	6	3
(Austria) Jurij Rodionov	7	3	6
(United Kingdom) Dan Evans	6	6
23	(Brazil) Rogério Dutra Silva	2	3

Second round
4	(Italy) Paolo Lorenzi	7^{7}	4	6
(United States) Tommy Paul	6^{4}	6	3
(Austria) Jurij Rodionov	4	6	5
(United Kingdom) Dan Evans	6	3	7

Qualifying competition
4	(Italy) Paolo Lorenzi	3	3
(United Kingdom) Dan Evans	6	6

=== Fifth qualifier ===
First round
5	(Norway) Casper Ruud	2	4
(Switzerland) Henri Laaksonen	6	6
(Argentina) Facundo Bagnis	4	3
(Germany) Tobias Kamke	6	6
(Turkey) Cem İlkel	3	6	7^{18}
(Belarus) Egor Gerasimov	6	3	6^{16}
(Portugal) João Domingues	6	6
30	(France) Constant Lestienne	4	4

Second round
(Switzerland) Henri Laaksonen	3	6	6
(Germany) Tobias Kamke	6	3	3
(Turkey) Cem İlkel	7^{7}	3	4
(Portugal) João Domingues	6^{4}	6	6

Qualifying competition
(Switzerland) Henri Laaksonen	7^{7}	6
(Portugal) João Domingues	6^{4}	2

=== Sixth qualifier ===
First round
6	(India) Prajnesh Gunneswaran	6	6
(Croatia) Viktor Galović	4	4
(United States) Donald Young	7	1	2
(Spain) Enrique López Pérez	5	6	6
(Japan) Yosuke Watanuki	7	6
(South Korea) Kwon Soon-woo	5	4
(Australia) John-Patrick Smith	5	3
19	(Germany) Matthias Bachinger	7	6

Second round
6	(India) Prajnesh Gunneswaran	6	6
(Spain) Enrique López Pérez	3	3
(Japan) Yosuke Watanuki	7^{7}	2	6
19	(Germany) Matthias Bachinger	6^{5}	6	3

Qualifying competition
6	(India) Prajnesh Gunneswaran	6^{5}	6	6
(Japan) Yosuke Watanuki	7^{7}	4	4

=== Seventh qualifier ===
First round
7	(Slovakia) Lukáš Lacko	4	6	6^{9}
(United States) Tim Smyczek	6	4	7^{11}
(Serbia) Peđa Krstin	4	6	7^{10}
(Serbia) Nikola Milojević	6	4	6^{7}
(France) Calvin Hemery	7^{7}	7^{7}
WC	(Australia) Alexander Crnokrak	6^{4}	6^{1}
(France) Gleb Sakharov	6	6
18	(France) Quentin Halys	2	4

Second round
(United States) Tim Smyczek	6	6
(Serbia) Peđa Krstin	3	2
(France) Calvin Hemery	4	6	3
(France) Gleb Sakharov	6	3	6

Qualifying competition
(United States) Tim Smyczek	6	3	4
(France) Gleb Sakharov	3	6	6

=== Eighth qualifier ===
First round
8	(Belgium) Ruben Bemelmans	5	4
(Belgium) Kimmer Coppejans	7	6
(Spain) Alejandro Davidovich Fokina	7	7^{7}
(Spain) Daniel Gimeno Traver	5	6^{4}
WC	(United States) Sebastian Korda	1	2
(Japan) Go Soeda	6	6
(Slovakia) Andrej Martin	3	4
27	(Italy) Stefano Travaglia	6	6

Second round
(Belgium) Kimmer Coppejans	6	3	6
(Spain) Alejandro Davidovich Fokina	2	6	3
(Japan) Go Soeda	6	3	5
27	(Italy) Stefano Travaglia	3	6	7

Qualifying competition
(Belgium) Kimmer Coppejans	4	2
27	(Italy) Stefano Travaglia	6	6

=== Ninth qualifier ===
First round
9	(Argentina) Juan Ignacio Londero	7	7
(Spain) Tommy Robredo	5	5
(Italy) Salvatore Caruso	3	6^{3}
(Germany) Oscar Otte	6	7^{7}
(Brazil) Guilherme Clezar	6^{10}	6^{6}
(Germany) Rudolf Molleker	7^{12}	7^{8}
(Spain) Sergio Gutiérrez Ferrol	3	2
21	(India) Ramkumar Ramanathan	6	6

Second round
9	(Argentina) Juan Ignacio Londero	2	2
(Germany) Oscar Otte	6	6
(Germany) Rudolf Molleker	5	7	7^{10}
21	(India) Ramkumar Ramanathan	7	5	6^{6}

Qualifying competition
(Germany) Oscar Otte	6	4	5
(Germany) Rudolf Molleker	4	6	7

=== Tenth qualifier ===
First round
10	(Canada) Peter Polansky	6	3	6
(United States) Ernesto Escobedo	4	6	4
(Czech Republic) Adam Pavlásek	5	3
(Slovenia) Blaž Rola	7	6
(Austria) Sebastian Ofner	7^{8}	7^{10}
(Japan) Yasutaka Uchiyama	6^{6}	6^{8}
(Egypt) Mohamed Safwat	2	6^{4}
32	(Australia) Thanasi Kokkinakis	6	7^{7}

Second round
10	(Canada) Peter Polansky	6	6^{6}	6
(Slovenia) Blaž Rola	2	7^{8}	3
(Austria) Sebastian Ofner	4	6^{4}
32	(Australia) Thanasi Kokkinakis	6	7^{7}

Qualifying competition
10	(Canada) Peter Polansky	4	4
32	(Australia) Thanasi Kokkinakis	6	6

=== Eleventh qualifier ===
First round
11	(South Africa) Lloyd Harris	6	6
(Czech Republic) Zdeněk Kolář	2	1
(Germany) Dominik Köpfer	3	6	6
WC	(Australia) Blake Ellis	6	0	3
(El Salvador) Marcelo Arévalo	7^{7}	6
(France) Antoine Hoang	6^{1}	4
(Germany) Dustin Brown	3	6	7
26	(Argentina) Carlos Berlocq	6	1	5

Second round
11	(South Africa) Lloyd Harris	7	6
(Germany) Dominik Köpfer	5	3
(El Salvador) Marcelo Arévalo	6	4	2
(Germany) Dustin Brown	2	6	6

Qualifying competition
11	(South Africa) Lloyd Harris	6	7^{12}
(Germany) Dustin Brown	1	6^{10}

=== Twelfth qualifier ===
First round
12	(Chinese Taipei) Jason Jung	3	6	7^{10}
(Italy) Gian Marco Moroni	6	1	6^{7}
(Japan) Hiroki Moriya	7^{7}	2	6
WC	(Australia) Rinky Hijikata	6^{4}	6	3
(Italy) Alessandro Giannessi	4	4
(Italy) Luca Vanni	6	6
(France) Kenny de Schepper	3	6	3
22	(Ukraine) Sergiy Stakhovsky	6	4	6

Second round
12	(Chinese Taipei) Jason Jung	2	3
(Japan) Hiroki Moriya	6	6
(Italy) Luca Vanni	6	7^{7}
22	(Ukraine) Sergiy Stakhovsky	4	6^{3}

Qualifying competition
(Japan) Hiroki Moriya	2	2
(Italy) Luca Vanni	6	6

=== Thirteenth qualifier ===
First round
13	(Argentina) Marco Trungelliti	6	6
(Germany) Kevin Krawietz	4	2
(Australia) Maverick Banes	6	1	2
(United Kingdom) James Ward	3	6	6
(Italy) Federico Gaio	6^{2}	6	5
(United States) Mitchell Krueger	7^{7}	4	7
(United States) Christian Harrison	4	6	4
20	(Spain) Adrián Menéndez Maceiras	6	2	6

Second round
13	(Argentina) Marco Trungelliti	6	3	6
(United Kingdom) James Ward	4	6	3
(United States) Mitchell Krueger	3	6	7
20	(Spain) Adrián Menéndez Maceiras	6	3	5

Qualifying competition
13	(Argentina) Marco Trungelliti	3	7	4
(United States) Mitchell Krueger	6	5	6

=== Fourteenth qualifier ===
First round
14	(Cyprus) Marcos Baghdatis	4	6	3
(Barbados) Darian King	6	4	6
(Slovakia) Filip Horanský	5	5
(Russia) Alexey Vatutin	7	7
(France) Nicolas Mahut	2	4
(Serbia) Viktor Troicki	6	6
(Brazil) Thomaz Bellucci	6	3	4
31	(Czech Republic) Lukáš Rosol	2	6	6

Second round
(Barbados) Darian King	6	4	6
(Russia) Alexey Vatutin	3	6	2
(Serbia) Viktor Troicki	7^{7}	6
31	(Czech Republic) Lukáš Rosol	6^{3}	1

Qualifying competition
(Barbados) Darian King	2	6	3
(Serbia) Viktor Troicki	6	3	6

=== Fifteenth qualifier ===
First round
15	(Germany) Yannick Maden	5	3
(Italy) Filippo Baldi	7	6
(Germany) Mats Moraing	6	7
WC	(Australia) Luke Saville	4	5
(Canada) Brayden Schnur	4	3
(Poland) Kamil Majchrzak	6	6
WC	(Australia) Akira Santillan	4	3
28	(United States) Noah Rubin	6	6

Second round
(Italy) Filippo Baldi	2	6	3
(Germany) Mats Moraing	6	3	6
(Poland) Kamil Majchrzak	7	6
28	(United States) Noah Rubin	5	1

Qualifying competition
(Germany) Mats Moraing	3	2
(Poland) Kamil Majchrzak	6	6

=== Sixteenth qualifier ===
First round
16	(Serbia) Miomir Kecmanović	6	3	6
(Italy) Gianluigi Quinzi	4	6	3
Alt	(United States) JC Aragone	7	0	4
(France) Maxime Janvier	5	6	6
(France) Grégoire Barrère	6	6
(South Korea) Lee Duck-hee	3	2
WC	(Australia) Aleksandar Vukic	6	6^{5}	3
17	(Brazil) Thiago Monteiro	3	7^{7}	6

Second round
16	(Serbia) Miomir Kecmanović	6	7^{7}
(France) Maxime Janvier	4	6^{5}
(France) Grégoire Barrère	3	3
17	(Brazil) Thiago Monteiro	6	6

Qualifying competition
16	(Serbia) Miomir Kecmanović	6	6
17	(Brazil) Thiago Monteiro	2	1
