= 2019 Australian Open – Day-by-day summaries =

The 2019 Australian Open described in detail, in the form of day-by-day summaries.

All dates are AEDT (UTC+11).

== Day 1 (14 January) ==
- Seeds out:
  - Men's Singles: (United States) John Isner [9], (United Kingdom) Kyle Edmund [13], (United States) Steve Johnson [31]
  - Women's Singles: (Germany) Julia Görges [14], (Latvia) Jeļena Ostapenko [22], (Czech Republic) Barbora Strýcová [32]
- Schedule of Play

Matches on main courts
Matches on Rod Laver Arena
| Event | Winner | Loser | Score |
|---|---|---|---|
| Women's Singles 1st Round | (Russia) Maria Sharapova [30] | (United Kingdom) Harriet Dart [Q] | 6–0, 6–0 |
| Men's Singles 1st Round | (Spain) Rafael Nadal [2] | (Australia) James Duckworth [WC] | 6–4, 6–3, 7–5 |
| Women's Singles 1st Round | (Germany) Angelique Kerber [2] | (Slovenia) Polona Hercog | 6–2, 6–2 |
| Women's Singles 1st Round | (Denmark) Caroline Wozniacki [3] | (Belgium) Alison Van Uytvanck | 6–3, 6–4 |
| Men's Singles 1st Round | (Switzerland) Roger Federer [3] | (Uzbekistan) Denis Istomin | 6–3, 6–4, 6–4 |
Matches on Margaret Court Arena
| Event | Winner | Loser | Score |
| Women's Singles 1st Round | (United States) Danielle Collins | (Germany) Julia Görges [14] | 2–6, 7–6^{(7–5)}, 6–4 |
| Women's Singles 1st Round | (United States) Sloane Stephens [5] | (United States) Taylor Townsend | 6–4, 6–2 |
| Men's Singles 1st Round | (Australia) Alex de Minaur [27] | (Portugal) Pedro Sousa | 6–4, 7–5, 6–4 |
| Women's Singles 1st Round | (Australia) Ashleigh Barty [15] | (Thailand) Luksika Kumkhum | 6–2, 6–2 |
| Men's Singles 1st Round | (Croatia) Marin Čilić [6] | (Australia) Bernard Tomic | 6–2, 6–4, 7–6^{(7–3)} |
Matches on Melbourne Arena
| Event | Winner | Loser | Score |
| Men's Singles 1st Round | (South Africa) Kevin Anderson [5] | (France) Adrian Mannarino | 6–3, 5–7, 6–2, 6–1 |
| Women's Singles 1st Round | (Greece) Maria Sakkari | (Latvia) Jeļena Ostapenko [22] | 6–1, 3–6, 6–2 |
| Men's Singles 1st Round | (Czech Republic) Tomáš Berdych | (United Kingdom) Kyle Edmund [13] | 6–3, 6–0, 7–5 |
| Men's Singles 1st Round | (Spain) Roberto Bautista Agut [22] | (United Kingdom) Andy Murray [PR] | 6–4, 6–4, 6–7^{(5–7)}, 6–7^{(4–7)}, 6–2 |
Matches on 1573 Arena
| Event | Winner | Loser | Score |
| Women's Singles 1st Round | (France) Caroline Garcia [19] | (France) Jessika Ponchet [Q] | 6–2, 6–3 |
| Men's Singles 1st Round | (Bulgaria) Grigor Dimitrov [20] | (Serbia) Janko Tipsarević [PR] | 4–6, 6–3, 6–1, 6–4 |
| Women's Singles 1st Round | (Netherlands) Kiki Bertens [9] | (United States) Alison Riske | 6–3, 6–3 |
| Men's Singles 1st Round | (Australia) Matthew Ebden | (Germany) Jan-Lennard Struff | 1–6, 6–4, 6–3, 6–4 |
| Women's Singles 1st Round | (Czech Republic) Petra Kvitová [8] | (Slovakia) Magdaléna Rybáriková | 6–3, 6–2 |
Coloured background indicates a night match
Day matches began at 11 am, whilst night matches began at 7 pm AEDT

== Day 2 (15 January) ==
- Seeds out:
  - Men's Singles: (Italy) Marco Cecchinato [17]
  - Women's Singles: (Russia) Daria Kasatkina [10], (Romania) Mihaela Buzărnescu [25], (Slovakia) Dominika Cibulková [26]
- Schedule of Play

Matches on main courts
Matches on Rod Laver Arena
| Event | Winner | Loser | Score |
|---|---|---|---|
| Women's Singles 1st Round | (United States) Madison Keys [17] | (Australia) Destanee Aiava [WC] | 6–2, 6–2 |
| Women's Singles 1st Round | (United States) Serena Williams [16] | (Germany) Tatjana Maria | 6–0, 6–2 |
| Men's Singles 1st Round | (Germany) Alexander Zverev [4] | (Slovenia) Aljaž Bedene | 6–4, 6–1, 6–4 |
| Men's Singles 1st Round | (Serbia) Novak Djokovic [1] | (United States) Mitchell Krueger [Q] | 6−3, 6−2, 6−2 |
| Women's Singles 1st Round | (Japan) Naomi Osaka [4] | (Poland) Magda Linette | 6−4, 6−2 |
Matches on Margaret Court Arena
| Event | Winner | Loser | Score |
| Men's Singles 1st Round | (Japan) Kei Nishikori [8] | (Poland) Kamil Majchrzak [Q] | 3–6, 6–7^{(6–8)}, 6–0, 6–2, 3–0, retired |
| Women's Singles 1st Round | (Slovenia) Tamara Zidanšek | (Australia) Daria Gavrilova | 7–5, 6–3 |
| Women's Singles 1st Round | (United States) Venus Williams | (Romania) Mihaela Buzărnescu [25] | 6–7^{(3–7)}, 7–6^{(7–3)}, 6–2 |
| Women's Singles 1st Round | (Romania) Simona Halep [1] | (Estonia) Kaia Kanepi | 6–7^{(2–7)}, 6–4, 6–2 |
| Men's Singles 1st Round | (Austria) Dominic Thiem [7] | (France) Benoît Paire | 6–4, 6–3, 5–7, 1–6, 6–3 |
Matches on Melbourne Arena
| Event | Winner | Loser | Score |
| Women's Singles 1st Round | (Czech Republic) Karolína Plíšková [7] | (Czech Republic) Karolína Muchová [Q] | 6–3, 6–2 |
| Men's Singles 1st Round | (Croatia) Borna Ćorić [11] | (Belgium) Steve Darcis [PR] | 6–1, 6–4, 6–4 |
| Women's Singles 1st Round | (Germany) Laura Siegemund [PR] | (Belarus) Victoria Azarenka | 6–7^{(5–7)}, 6–4, 6–2 |
| Women's Singles 1st Round | (Ukraine) Dayana Yastremska | (Australia) Samantha Stosur | 7–5, 6–2 |
| Men's Singles 1st Round | (Canada) Milos Raonic [16] | (Australia) Nick Kyrgios | 6−4, 7−6^{(7−4)}, 6−4 |
Matches on 1573 Arena
| Event | Winner | Loser | Score |
| Men's Singles 1st Round | (Italy) Fabio Fognini [12] | (Spain) Jaume Munar | 7–6^{(7–3)}, 7–6^{(9–7)}, 3–1, retired |
| Women's Singles 1st Round | (Canada) Eugenie Bouchard | (China) Peng Shuai [WC] | 6–2, 6–1 |
| Men's Singles 1st Round | (Canada) Denis Shapovalov [25] | (Spain) Pablo Andújar | 6–2, 6–3, 7–6^{(7–3)} |
| Women's Singles 1st Round | (Ukraine) Elina Svitolina [6] | (Switzerland) Viktorija Golubic [Q] | 6–1, 6–2 |
| Men's Singles 1st Round | (Germany) Maximilian Marterer | (France) Gleb Sakharov [Q] | 6–3, 6–1, 6–3 |
Coloured background indicates a night match
Day matches began at 11 am, whilst night matches began at 7 pm AEDT

== Day 3 (16 January) ==
- Seeds out:
  - Men's Singles: (South Africa) Kevin Anderson [5], (France) Gaël Monfils [30]
  - Women's Singles: (Netherlands) Kiki Bertens [9], (Estonia) Anett Kontaveit [20], (Ukraine) Lesia Tsurenko [24], (Croatia) Donna Vekić [29]
  - Men's Doubles: (Netherlands) Jean-Julien Rojer / (Romania) Horia Tecău [9], (Spain) Feliciano López / (Spain) Marc López [14], (India) Rohan Bopanna / (India) Divij Sharan [15], (Netherlands) Robin Haase / (Netherlands) Matwé Middelkoop [16]
  - Women's Doubles: (Germany) Anna-Lena Grönefeld / (United States) Vania King [12], (Japan) Miyu Kato / (Japan) Makoto Ninomiya [14]
- Schedule of Play

Matches on main courts
Matches on Rod Laver Arena
| Event | Winner | Loser | Score |
|---|---|---|---|
| Women's Singles 2nd Round | (United States) Sloane Stephens [5] | (Hungary) Tímea Babos | 6–3, 6–1 |
| Women's Singles 2nd Round | (Australia) Ashleigh Barty [15] | (China) Wang Yafan | 6–2, 6–3 |
| Men's Singles 2nd Round | (Switzerland) Roger Federer [3] | (United Kingdom) Dan Evans [Q] | 7−6^{(7−5)}, 7−6^{(7−3)}, 6−3 |
| Women's Singles 2nd Round | (Germany) Angelique Kerber [2] | (Brazil) Beatriz Haddad Maia [Q] | 6−2, 6−3 |
| Men's Singles 2nd Round | (Spain) Rafael Nadal [2] | (Australia) Matthew Ebden | 6−3, 6−2, 6−2 |
Matches on Margaret Court Arena
| Event | Winner | Loser | Score |
| Women's Singles 2nd Round | (Russia) Anastasia Pavlyuchenkova | (Netherlands) Kiki Bertens [9] | 3–6, 6–3, 6–3 |
| Men's Singles 2nd Round | (United States) Frances Tiafoe | (South Africa) Kevin Anderson [5] | 4−6, 6−4, 6−4, 7−5 |
| Women's Singles 2nd Round | (Denmark) Caroline Wozniacki [3] | (Sweden) Johanna Larsson | 6−1, 6−3 |
| Men's Singles 2nd Round | (Australia) Alex de Minaur [27] | (Switzerland) Henri Laaksonen [Q] | 6−4, 6−2, 6−7^{(7−9)}, 4−6, 6−3 |
| Women's Singles 2nd Round | (Russia) Maria Sharapova [30] | (Sweden) Rebecca Peterson | 6–2, 6–1 |
Matches on Melbourne Arena
| Event | Winner | Loser | Score |
| Women's Singles 2nd Round | (Belarus) Aliaksandra Sasnovich | (Estonia) Anett Kontaveit [20] | 6–3, 6–3 |
| Men's Singles 2nd Round | (Croatia) Marin Čilić [6] | (United States) Mackenzie McDonald | 7−5, 6−7^{(9−11)}, 6−4, 6−4 |
| Women's Singles 2nd Round | (Belarus) Aryna Sabalenka [11] | (United Kingdom) Katie Boulter | 6−3, 6−4 |
| Men's Singles 2nd Round | (Spain) Roberto Bautista Agut [22] | (Australia) John Millman | 6−3, 6−1, 3−6, 6−7^{(6−8)}, 6−4 |
Coloured background indicates a night match
Day matches began at 11 am, whilst night matches began at 7 pm AEDT

== Day 4 (17 January) ==
History was created when Garbiñe Muguruza and Johanna Konta played out a three-set thriller which ended at 3.12 am. It was the latest start of a match in the history of the Australian Open, with play starting at 12.30 am after Alexander Zverev's marathon win.

- Seeds out:
  - Men's Singles: (Austria) Dominic Thiem [7], (South Korea) Chung Hyeon [24], (France) Gilles Simon [29], (Germany) Philipp Kohlschreiber [32]
  - Women's Singles: (Spain) Carla Suárez Navarro [23]
  - Men's Doubles: (Colombia) Juan Sebastián Cabal / (Colombia) Robert Farah [2], (Japan) Ben McLachlan / (Germany) Jan-Lennard Struff [8]
  - Women's Doubles: (Canada) Gabriela Dabrowski / (China) Xu Yifan [3], (United States) Bethanie Mattek-Sands / (Netherlands) Demi Schuurs [15], (China) Peng Shuai / (China) Yang Zhaoxuan [16]
- Schedule of Play

Matches on main courts
Matches on Rod Laver Arena
| Event | Winner | Loser | Score |
|---|---|---|---|
| Women's Singles 2nd Round | (Ukraine) Elina Svitolina [6] | (Slovakia) Viktória Kužmová | 6–4, 6–1 |
| Men's Singles 2nd Round | (Canada) Milos Raonic [16] | (Switzerland) Stan Wawrinka | 6–7^{(4–7)}, 7–6^{(8–6)}, 7–6^{(13–11)}, 7–6^{(7–5)} |
| Women's Singles 2nd Round | (Romania) Simona Halep [1] | (United States) Sofia Kenin | 6–3, 6–7^{(5–7)}, 6–4 |
| Women's Singles 2nd Round | (United States) Serena Williams [16] | (Canada) Eugenie Bouchard | 6−2, 6−2 |
| Men's Singles 2nd Round | (Serbia) Novak Djokovic [1] | (France) Jo-Wilfried Tsonga [WC] | 6–3, 7–5, 6–4 |
Matches on Margaret Court Arena
| Event | Winner | Loser | Score |
| Men's Singles 2nd Round | (Japan) Kei Nishikori [8] | (Croatia) Ivo Karlović | 6–3, 7–6^{(8–6)}, 5–7, 5–7, 7–6^{(10–7)} |
| Women's Singles 2nd Round | (Japan) Naomi Osaka [4] | (Slovenia) Tamara Zidanšek | 6–2, 6–4 |
| Women's Singles 2nd Round | (United States) Venus Williams | (France) Alizé Cornet | 6–3, 4–6, 6–0 |
| Men's Singles 2nd Round | (Germany) Alexander Zverev [4] | (France) Jérémy Chardy | 7−6^{(7−5)}, 6−4, 5−7, 6−7^{(6−8)}, 6−1 |
| Women's Singles 2nd Round | (Spain) Garbiñe Muguruza [18] | (United Kingdom) Johanna Konta | 6–4, 6–7^{(3–7)}, 7–5 |
Matches on Melbourne Arena
| Event | Winner | Loser | Score |
| Women's Singles 2nd Round | (Czech Republic) Karolína Plíšková [7] | (United States) Madison Brengle | 4–6, 6–1, 6–0 |
| Women's Singles 2nd Round | (United States) Madison Keys [17] | (Russia) Anastasia Potapova | 6–3, 6–4 |
| Men's Singles 2nd Round | (France) Pierre-Hugues Herbert | (South Korea) Chung Hyeon [24] | 6–2, 1–6, 6–2, 6–4 |
| Men's Singles 2nd Round | (Australia) Alexei Popyrin [WC] | (Austria) Dominic Thiem [7] | 7–5, 6–4, 2–0, retired |
Coloured background indicates a night match
Day matches began at 11 am, whilst night matches began at 7 pm AEDT

== Day 5 (18 January) ==
- Seeds out:
  - Men's Singles: (Argentina) Diego Schwartzman [18], (Georgia (country)) Nikoloz Basilashvili [19], (Spain) Fernando Verdasco [26], (Australia) Alex de Minaur [27]
  - Women's Singles: (Denmark) Caroline Wozniacki [3], (Belarus) Aryna Sabalenka [11], (France) Caroline Garcia [19], (Croatia) Petra Martić [31]
  - Men's Doubles: (Austria) Oliver Marach / (Croatia) Mate Pavić [1], (Croatia) Ivan Dodig / (France) Édouard Roger-Vasselin [13]
  - Women's Doubles: (Czech Republic) Lucie Hradecká / (Russia) Ekaterina Makarova [6], (Chinese Taipei) Hsieh Su-wei / (United States) Abigail Spears [8]
  - Mixed Doubles:
- Schedule of Play

Matches on main courts
Matches on Rod Laver Arena
| Event | Winner | Loser | Score |
|---|---|---|---|
| Women's Singles 3rd Round | (Australia) Ashleigh Barty [15] | (Greece) Maria Sakkari | 7–5, 6–1 |
| Men's Singles 3rd Round | (Switzerland) Roger Federer [3] | (United States) Taylor Fritz | 6–2, 7–5, 6–2 |
| Women's Singles 3rd Round | (Russia) Maria Sharapova [30] | (Denmark) Caroline Wozniacki [3] | 6–4, 4–6, 6–3 |
| Men's Singles 3rd Round | (Spain) Rafael Nadal [2] | (Australia) Alex de Minaur [27] | 6–1, 6–2, 6–4 |
| Women's Singles 3rd Round | (Germany) Angelique Kerber [2] | (Australia) Kimberly Birrell [WC] | 6–1, 6–0 |
Matches on Margaret Court Arena
| Event | Winner | Loser | Score |
| Men's Singles 3rd Round | (Greece) Stefanos Tsitsipas [14] | (Georgia (country)) Nikoloz Basilashvili [19] | 6–3, 3–6, 7–6^{(9–7)}, 6–4 |
| Women's Singles 3rd Round | (United States) Amanda Anisimova | (Belarus) Aryna Sabalenka [11] | 6–3, 6–2 |
| Women's Singles 3rd Round | (United States) Sloane Stephens [5] | (Croatia) Petra Martić [31] | 7–6^{(8–6)}, 7–6^{(7–5)} |
| Women's Singles 3rd Round | (United States) Danielle Collins | (France) Caroline Garcia [19] | 6–3, 6–2 |
| Men's Singles 3rd Round | (Croatia) Marin Čilić [6] | (Spain) Fernando Verdasco [26] | 4–6, 3–6, 6–1, 7–6^{(10–8)}, 6–3 |
Matches on Melbourne Arena
| Event | Winner | Loser | Score |
| Men's Singles 3rd Round | (Czech Republic) Tomáš Berdych | (Argentina) Diego Schwartzman [18] | 5–7, 6–3, 7–5, 6–4 |
| Women's Singles 3rd Round | (Russia) Anastasia Pavlyuchenkova | (Belarus) Aliaksandra Sasnovich | 6–0, 6–3 |
| Men's Singles 3rd Round | (Bulgaria) Grigor Dimitrov [20] | (Italy) Thomas Fabbiano | 7–6^{(7–5)}, 6–4, 6–4 |
| Women's Singles 3rd Round | (Czech Republic) Petra Kvitová [8] | (Switzerland) Belinda Bencic | 6–1, 6–4 |
Coloured background indicates a night match
Day matches began at 11 am, whilst night matches began at 7 pm AEDT

== Day 6 (19 January) ==
- Seeds out:
  - Men's Singles: (Italy) Fabio Fognini [12], (Belgium) David Goffin [21], (Canada) Denis Shapovalov [25]
  - Women's Singles: (Belgium) Elise Mertens [12], (China) Wang Qiang [21], (Italy) Camila Giorgi [27], (Chinese Taipei) Hsieh Su-wei [28]
  - Men's Doubles: (United Kingdom) Dominic Inglot / (Croatia) Franko Škugor [10]
  - Women's Doubles: (Romania) Irina-Camelia Begu / (Romania) Mihaela Buzărnescu [10], (Japan) Eri Hozumi / (Poland) Alicja Rosolska [11]
  - Mixed Doubles: (Japan) Makoto Ninomiya / (Japan) Ben McLachlan [7], (Russia) Ekaterina Makarova / (New Zealand) Artem Sitak [8]
- Schedule of Play

Matches on main courts
Matches on Rod Laver Arena
| Event | Winner | Loser | Score |
|---|---|---|---|
| Women's Singles 3rd Round | (Ukraine) Elina Svitolina [6] | (China) Zhang Shuai | 4–6, 6–4, 7–5 |
| Women's Singles 3rd Round | (United States) Serena Williams [16] | (Ukraine) Dayana Yastremska | 6–2, 6–1 |
| Men's Singles 3rd Round | (Serbia) Novak Djokovic [1] | (Canada) Denis Shapovalov [25] | 6–3, 6–4, 4–6, 6–0 |
| Men's Singles 3rd Round | (Germany) Alexander Zverev [4] | (Australia) Alex Bolt [WC] | 6–3, 6–3, 6–2 |
| Women's Singles 3rd Round | (Czech Republic) Karolína Plíšková [7] | (Italy) Camila Giorgi [27] | 6–4, 3–6, 6–2 |
Matches on Margaret Court Arena
| Event | Winner | Loser | Score |
| Women's Singles 3rd Round | (Japan) Naomi Osaka [4] | (Chinese Taipei) Hsieh Su-wei [28] | 5–7, 6–4, 6–1 |
| Men's Singles 3rd Round | (Japan) Kei Nishikori [8] | (Portugal) João Sousa | 7–6^{(8–6)}, 6–1, 6–2 |
| Women's Singles 3rd Round | (United States) Madison Keys [17] | (Belgium) Elise Mertens [12] | 6–3, 6–2 |
| Women's Singles 3rd Round | (Romania) Simona Halep [1] | (United States) Venus Williams | 6−2, 6−3 |
| Men's Singles 3rd Round | (France) Lucas Pouille [28] | (Australia) Alexei Popyrin [WC] | 7–6^{(7–3)}, 6–3, 6–7^{(10–12)}, 4–6, 6–3 |
Matches on Melbourne Arena
| Event | Winner | Loser | Score |
| Men's Legends' Doubles Round Robin | (United States) John McEnroe (United States) Patrick McEnroe | (Sweden) Jonas Björkman (Sweden) Thomas Johansson | 3–4^{(4–5)}, 4–3^{(5–4)}, 4–2 |
| Men's Singles 3rd Round | (Russia) Daniil Medvedev [15] | (Belgium) David Goffin [21] | 6–2, 7–6^{(7–3)}, 6–3 |
| Men's Singles 3rd Round | (Canada) Milos Raonic [16] | (France) Pierre-Hugues Herbert | 6–4, 6–4, 7–6^{(8–6)} |
| Women's Singles 3rd Round | (Spain) Garbiñe Muguruza [18] | (Switzerland) Timea Bacsinszky [PR] | 7–6^{(10–8)}, 6–2 |
Coloured background indicates a night match
Day matches began at 11 am, whilst night matches began at 7 pm AEDT

== Day 7 (20 January) ==
- Seeds out:
  - Men's Singles: (Switzerland) Roger Federer [3], (Croatia) Marin Čilić [6], (Bulgaria) Grigor Dimitrov [20]
  - Women's Singles: (Germany) Angelique Kerber [2], (United States) Sloane Stephens [5], (Russia) Maria Sharapova [30]
  - Mixed Doubles: (Romania) Mihaela Buzărnescu / (Austria) Oliver Marach [4]
- Schedule of Play

Matches on main courts
Matches on Rod Laver Arena
| Event | Winner | Loser | Score |
|---|---|---|---|
| Women's Singles 4th Round | (Czech Republic) Petra Kvitová [8] | (United States) Amanda Anisimova | 6–2, 6–1 |
| Women's Singles 4th Round | (Australia) Ashleigh Barty [15] | (Russia) Maria Sharapova [30] | 4−6, 6−1, 6−4 |
| Men's Singles 4th Round | (Spain) Rafael Nadal [2] | (Czech Republic) Tomáš Berdych | 6–0, 6–1, 7–6^{(7–4)} |
| Men's Singles 4th Round | (Greece) Stefanos Tsitsipas [14] | (Switzerland) Roger Federer [3] | 6−7^{(11−13)}, 7−6^{(7−3)}, 7−5, 7−6^{(7−5)} |
| Women's Singles 4th Round | (Russia) Anastasia Pavlyuchenkova | (United States) Sloane Stephens [5] | 6–7^{(3–7)}, 6–3, 6–3 |
Matches on Margaret Court Arena
| Event | Winner | Loser | Score |
| Men's Legends Doubles Round Robin | (South Africa) Wayne Ferreira (Croatia) Goran Ivanišević | (Australia) Pat Cash (Australia) Mark Woodforde | 1−4, 4−1, 4−2 |
| Women's Doubles 3rd Round | (United States) Raquel Atawo [9] (Russia) Katarina Srebotnik [9] | (Romania) Irina Bara (Romania) Monica Niculescu | 6−2, 3−6, 6−3 |
| Women's Singles 4th Round | (United States) Danielle Collins | (Germany) Angelique Kerber [2] | 6–0, 6–2 |
| Men's Singles 4th Round | (Spain) Roberto Bautista Agut [22] | (Croatia) Marin Čilić [6] | 6–7^{(6–8)}, 6–3, 6–2, 4–6, 6–4 |
Matches on Melbourne Arena
| Event | Winner | Loser | Score |
| Women's Doubles 3rd Round | (Slovenia) Andreja Klepač [5] (Spain) María José Martínez Sánchez [5] | (United States) Kaitlyn Christian (United States) Asia Muhammad | 6–2, 6–2 |
| Men's Singles 4th Round | (United States) Frances Tiafoe | (Bulgaria) Grigor Dimitrov [20] | 7−5, 7−6^{(8−6)}, 6−7^{(1−7)}, 7−5 |
| Men's Doubles 3rd Round | (Finland) Henri Kontinen [12] (Australia) John Peers [12] | (Moldova) Radu Albot (Tunisia) Malek Jaziri | 7−6^{(7–5)}, 6–4 |
Coloured background indicates a night match
Day matches began at 11 am, whilst night matches began at 7 pm AEDT

== Day 8 (21 January) ==
- Seeds out:
  - Men's Singles: (Germany) Alexander Zverev [4], (Croatia) Borna Ćorić [11], (Russia) Daniil Medvedev [15], (Spain) Pablo Carreño Busta [23]
  - Women's Singles: (Romania) Simona Halep [1], (Latvia) Anastasija Sevastova [13], (United States) Madison Keys [17], (Spain) Garbiñe Muguruza [18]
  - Men's Doubles: (United States) Rajeev Ram / (United Kingdom) Joe Salisbury [11]
  - Women's Doubles: (United States) Nicole Melichar / (Czech Republic) Květa Peschke [4], (Belgium) Kirsten Flipkens / (Sweden) Johanna Larsson [13]
- Schedule of Play

Matches on main courts
Matches on Rod Laver Arena
| Event | Winner | Loser | Score |
|---|---|---|---|
| Men's Legends Doubles Round Robin | (United States) John McEnroe (United States) Patrick McEnroe | (France) Henri Leconte (Australia) Todd Woodbridge | 4–1, 4–3^{(5–2)} |
| Women's Singles 4th Round | (Japan) Naomi Osaka [4] | (Latvia) Anastasija Sevastova [13] | 4–6, 6–3, 6–4 |
| Men's Singles 4th Round | (Canada) Milos Raonic [16] | (Germany) Alexander Zverev [4] | 6−1, 6−1, 7−6^{(7−5)} |
| Women's Singles 4th Round | (United States) Serena Williams [16] | (Romania) Simona Halep [1] | 6–1, 4–6, 6–4 |
| Men's Singles 4th Round | (Serbia) Novak Djokovic [1] | (Russia) Daniil Medvedev [15] | 6–4, 6–7^{(5–7)}, 6–2, 6–3 |
Matches on Margaret Court Arena
| Event | Winner | Loser | Score |
| Women's Singles 4th Round | (Ukraine) Elina Svitolina [6] | (United States) Madison Keys [17] | 6–2, 1–6, 6–1 |
| Women's Doubles 3rd Round | (Australia) Samantha Stosur (China) Zhang Shuai | (France) Alizé Cornet (Croatia) Petra Martić | 7–5, 6–3 |
| Women's Singles 4th Round | (Czech Republic) Karolína Plíšková [7] | (Spain) Garbiñe Muguruza [18] | 6−3, 6−1 |
| Men's Singles 4th Round | (Japan) Kei Nishikori [8] | (Spain) Pablo Carreño Busta [23] | 6−7^{(8−10)}, 4−6, 7−6^{(7−4)}, 6−4, 7−6^{(10−8)} |
Matches on Melbourne Arena
| Event | Winner | Loser | Score |
| Mixed Doubles 2nd Round | (Australia) Astra Sharma [WC] (Australia) John-Patrick Smith [WC] | (Slovenia) Andreja Klepač (France) Édouard Roger-Vasselin | 6–4, 7–5 |
| Women's Doubles 3rd Round | (Hungary) Tímea Babos [2] (France) Kristina Mladenovic [2] | (Belgium) Kirsten Flipkens [13] (Sweden) Johanna Larsson [13] | 6–1, 6–4 |
| Women's Doubles 3rd Round | (Czech Republic) Barbora Krejčíková [1] (Czech Republic) Kateřina Siniaková [1] | (Belgium) Elise Mertens (Belarus) Aryna Sabalenka | 2−6, 6−2, 6−3 |
| Men's Singles 4th Round | (France) Lucas Pouille [28] | (Croatia) Borna Ćorić [11] | 6−7^{(4−7)}, 6−4, 7−5, 7−6^{(7−2)} |
Coloured background indicates a night match
Day matches began at 11 am, whilst night matches began at 7 pm AEDT

== Day 9 (22 January) ==
- Seeds out:
  - Men's Singles: (Spain) Roberto Bautista Agut [22]
  - Women's Singles: (Australia) Ashleigh Barty [15]
  - Men's Doubles: (South Africa) Raven Klaasen / (New Zealand) Michael Venus [6]
  - Women's Doubles: (Czech Republic) Barbora Krejčíková / (Czech Republic) Kateřina Siniaková [1], (Slovenia) Andreja Klepač / (Spain) María José Martínez Sánchez [5], (Chinese Taipei) Chan Hao-ching / (Chinese Taipei) Latisha Chan [7], (United States) Raquel Atawo / (Slovenia) Katarina Srebotnik [9]
- Schedule of Play

Matches on main courts
Matches on Rod Laver Arena
| Event | Winner | Loser | Score |
|---|---|---|---|
| Men's Legends Doubles Round Robin | (France) Mansour Bahrami (Australia) Mark Philippoussis | (South Africa) Wayne Ferreira (Croatia) Goran Ivanišević | 4−1, 2−4, 4−3^{(4−1)} |
| Men's Singles Quarterfinals | (Greece) Stefanos Tsitsipas [14] | (Spain) Roberto Bautista Agut [22] | 7−5, 4−6, 6−4, 7−6^{(7−2)} |
| Women's Singles Quarterfinals | (United States) Danielle Collins | (Russia) Anastasia Pavlyuchenkova | 2−6, 7−5, 6−1 |
| Women's Singles Quarterfinals | (Czech Republic) Petra Kvitová [8] | (Australia) Ashleigh Barty [15] | 6−1, 6−4 |
| Men's Singles Quarterfinals | (Spain) Rafael Nadal [2] | (United States) Frances Tiafoe | 6−3, 6−4, 6−2 |
Matches on Margaret Court Arena
| Event | Winner | Loser | Score |
| Women's Doubles Quarterfinals | (Australia) Samantha Stosur (China) Zhang Shuai | (Czech Republic) Barbora Krejčíková [1] (Czech Republic) Kateřina Siniaková [1] | 7−6^{(7−2)}, 7−6^{(7−4)} |
| Men's Doubles Quarterfinals | (Argentina) Leonardo Mayer (Portugal) João Sousa | (South Africa) Raven Klaasen [6] (New Zealand) Michael Venus [6] | 6−4, 7−6^{(8−6)} |
| Men's Legends Doubles Round Robin | (Sweden) Jonas Björkman (Sweden) Thomas Johansson | (United States) Michael Chang (Netherlands) Jacco Eltingh | 4−2, 4−3^{(5−3)} |
| Mixed Doubles 2nd Round | (Germany) Anna-Lena Grönefeld [5] (Colombia) Robert Farah [5] | (Australia) Samantha Stosur [WC] (India) Leander Paes [WC] | 4−6, 6−4, [10−8] |
Coloured background indicates a night match
Day matches began at 11 am, whilst night matches began at 7 pm AEDT

== Day 10 (23 January) ==
- Seeds out:
  - Men's Singles: (Japan) Kei Nishikori [8], (Canada) Milos Raonic [16]
  - Women's Singles: (Ukraine) Elina Svitolina [6], (United States) Serena Williams [16]
  - Men's Doubles: (United Kingdom) Jamie Murray / (Brazil) Bruno Soares [3], (United States) Bob Bryan / (United States) Mike Bryan [4], (Poland) Łukasz Kubot / (Argentina) Horacio Zeballos [7]
  - Mixed Doubles: (Canada) Gabriela Dabrowski / (Croatia) Mate Pavić [1], (Germany) Anna-Lena Grönefeld / (Colombia) Robert Farah [5], (United States) Abigail Spears / (Colombia) Juan Sebastián Cabal [6]
- Schedule of Play

Matches on main courts
Matches on Rod Laver Arena
| Event | Winner | Loser | Score |
|---|---|---|---|
| Women's Singles Quarterfinals | (Japan) Naomi Osaka [4] | (Ukraine) Elina Svitolina [6] | 6–4, 6–1 |
| Women's Singles Quarterfinals | (Czech Republic) Karolína Plíšková [7] | (United States) Serena Williams [16] | 6−4, 4−6, 7−5 |
| Men's Singles Quarterfinals | (France) Lucas Pouille [28] | (Canada) Milos Raonic [16] | 7–6^{(7–4)}, 6–3, 6–7^{(2–7)}, 6–4 |
| Men's Singles Quarterfinals | (Serbia) Novak Djokovic [1] | (Japan) Kei Nishikori [8] | 6–1, 4–1, retired |
| Women's Doubles Semifinals | (Australia) Samantha Stosur (China) Zhang Shuai | (Czech Republic) Barbora Strýcová (Czech Republic) Markéta Vondroušová | 7–5, 4–6, 7–5 |
Matches on Margaret Court Arena
| Event | Winner | Loser | Score |
| Men's Doubles Quarterfinals | (France) Pierre-Hugues Herbert [5] (France) Nicolas Mahut [5] | (United States) Bob Bryan [4] (United States) Mike Bryan [4] | 6−4, 7−6^{(7−3)} |
| Men's Doubles Quarterfinals | (Finland) Henri Kontinen [12] (Australia) John Peers [12] | (United Kingdom) Jamie Murray [3] (Brazil) Bruno Soares [3] | 6−3, 6−4 |
| Women's Doubles Semifinals | (Hungary) Tímea Babos [2] (France) Kristina Mladenovic [2] | (United States) Jennifer Brady (United States) Alison Riske | 6−4, 6−2 |
| Mixed Doubles Quarterfinals | (Australia) Astra Sharma [WC] (Australia) John-Patrick Smith [WC] | (United States) Bethanie Mattek-Sands (United Kingdom) Jamie Murray | 6–2, 7–6^{(7–5)} |
Coloured background indicates a night match
Day matches began at 11 am, whilst night matches began at 7:30 pm AEDT

== Day 11 (24 January) ==
- Seeds out:
  - Men's Singles: (Greece) Stefanos Tsitsipas [14]
  - Women's Singles: (Czech Republic) Karolína Plíšková [7]
  - Mixed Doubles: (United States) Nicole Melichar / (Brazil) Bruno Soares [2]
- Schedule of Play

Matches on main courts
Matches on Rod Laver Arena
| Event | Winner | Loser | Score |
|---|---|---|---|
| Men's Doubles Semifinals | (Finland) Henri Kontinen [12] (Australia) John Peers [12] | (Argentina) Leonardo Mayer (Portugal) João Sousa | 6–1, 7–6^{(8–6)} |
| Women's Singles Semifinals | (Czech Republic) Petra Kvitová [8] | (United States) Danielle Collins | 7–6^{(7–2)}, 6–0 |
| Women's Singles Semifinals | (Japan) Naomi Osaka [4] | (Czech Republic) Karolína Plíšková [7] | 6–2, 4–6, 6–4 |
| Men's Singles Semifinals | (Spain) Rafael Nadal [2] | (Greece) Stefanos Tsitsipas [14] | 6–2, 6–4, 6–0 |
| Mixed Doubles Semifinals | (Australia) Astra Sharma [WC] (Australia) John-Patrick Smith [WC] | (United States) Nicole Melichar [2] (Brazil) Bruno Soares [2] | 6–4, 7–6^{(7–5)} |
Matches on Margaret Court Arena
| Event | Winner | Loser | Score |
| Men's Legends Doubles Round Robin | (United States) John McEnroe (United States) Patrick McEnroe | (United States) Michael Chang (Netherlands) Jacco Eltingh | 4–3^{(5–1)}, 4–2 |
| Men's Legends Doubles Round Robin | (Sweden) Thomas Enqvist (Sweden) Mats Wilander | (South Africa) Wayne Ferreira (Croatia) Goran Ivanišević | 4–3^{(5–4)}, 4–1 |
| Men's Doubles Semifinals | (France) Pierre-Hugues Herbert [5] (France) Nicolas Mahut [5] | (United States) Ryan Harrison (United States) Sam Querrey | 6–4, 6–2 |
| Mixed Doubles Semifinals | (Czech Republic) Barbora Krejčíková [3] (United States) Rajeev Ram [3] | (Spain) María José Martínez Sánchez (United Kingdom) Neal Skupski | 6–0, 6–4 |
| Quad Wheelchair Doubles Final | (Australia) Dylan Alcott (Australia) Heath Davidson | (United Kingdom) Andy Lapthorne (United States) David Wagner | 6–3, 6–7^{(6–8)}, [12–10] |
| Boys' Singles Quarterfinals | (United States) Emilio Nava [13] | (Czech Republic) Jiří Lehečka | 7–6^{(7–5)}, 4–6, 6–2 |
| Wheelchair Men's Singles Semifinals | (Sweden) Stefan Olsson | (Japan) Shingo Kunieda [1] | 6–4, 3–6, 6–3 |
Coloured background indicates a night match
Day matches began at 11 am, whilst night matches began at 7:30 pm AEDT

== Day 12 (25 January) ==
- Seeds out:
  - Men's Singles: (France) Lucas Pouille [28]
  - Women's Doubles: (Hungary) Tímea Babos / (France) Kristina Mladenovic [2]
- Schedule of Play

Matches on main courts
Matches on Rod Laver Arena
| Event | Winner | Loser | Score |
|---|---|---|---|
| Men's Legends Doubles Final | (France) Mansour Bahrami (Australia) Mark Philippoussis | (Sweden) Jonas Björkman (Sweden) Thomas Johansson | 4–3^{(5–3)}, 4–2 |
| Women's Doubles Final | (Australia) Samantha Stosur (China) Zhang Shuai | (Hungary) Tímea Babos [2] (France) Kristina Mladenovic [2] | 6–3, 6–4 |
| Men's Singles Semifinals | (Serbia) Novak Djokovic [1] | (France) Lucas Pouille [28] | 6–0, 6–2, 6–2 |
Day matches began at 3 pm, whilst night matches began at 7:30 pm AEDT

== Day 13 (26 January) ==
- Seeds out:
  - Women's Singles: (Czech Republic) Petra Kvitová [8]
- Schedule of Play

Matches on main courts
Matches on Rod Laver Arena
| Event | Winner | Loser | Score |
|---|---|---|---|
| Girls' Singles Final | (Denmark) Clara Tauson [1] | (Canada) Leylah Annie Fernandez [4] | 6–4, 6–3 |
| Wheelchair Quad Singles Final | (Australia) Dylan Alcott [1] | (United States) David Wagner [2] | 6–4, 7–6^{(7–2)} |
| Boys' Singles Final | (Italy) Lorenzo Musetti [1] | (United States) Emilio Nava [13] | 4–6, 6–2, 7–6^{(14–12)} |
| Women's Singles Final | (Japan) Naomi Osaka [4] | (Czech Republic) Petra Kvitová [8] | 7–6^{(7–2)}, 5–7, 6–4 |
| Mixed Doubles Final | (Czech Republic) Barbora Krejčíková [3] (United States) Rajeev Ram [3] | (Australia) Astra Sharma [WC] (Australia) John-Patrick Smith [WC] | 7–6^{(7–3)}, 6–1 |
Coloured background indicates a night match
Day matches began at 12:15 pm, whilst night matches began at 7:30 pm AEDT

== Day 14 (27 January) ==
- Seeds out:
  - Men's Singles: (Spain) Rafael Nadal [2]
  - Men's Doubles: (Finland) Henri Kontinen / (Australia) John Peers [12]
- Schedule of Play

Matches on main courts
Matches on Rod Laver Arena
| Event | Winner | Loser | Score |
|---|---|---|---|
| Men's Doubles Final | (France) Pierre-Hugues Herbert [5] (France) Nicolas Mahut [5] | (Finland) Henri Kontinen [12] (Australia) John Peers [12] | 6–4, 7–6^{(7–1)} |
| Men's Singles Final | (Serbia) Novak Djokovic [1] | (Spain) Rafael Nadal [2] | 6–3, 6–2, 6–3 |
Coloured background indicates a night match
Day matches began at 3 pm, whilst night matches began at 7:30 pm AEDT
