= 2019 Australian Open – Girls' doubles =

Girls' doubles
- 2019 Australian Open

Final
- Champions: (Japan) Natsumi Kawaguchi (Hungary) Adrienn Nagy
- Runners-up: (United States) Chloe Beck (United States) Emma Navarro
- Score: 6–4, 6–4

Events
Singles	men	women		boys	girls
Doubles	men	women	mixed	boys	girls
WC Singles	men	women	quad
WC Doubles	men	women	quad
Legends	men	women	mixed
- Australian Open

Natsumi Kawaguchi and Adrienn Nagy won the girls' doubles tennis title at the 2019 Australian Open, defeating Chloe Beck and Emma Navarro in the final, 6–4, 6–4.

Liang En-shuo and Wang Xinyu were the defending champions. However, Liang was no longer eligible to participate in junior tournaments, and Wang chose not to participate.

== Seeds ==
1. (South Korea) Park So-hyun / (Hong Kong) Cody Wong Hong-yi (second round)
2. (Thailand) Thasaporn Naklo / (Thailand) Mananchaya Sawangkaew (quarterfinals)
3. (Japan) Natsumi Kawaguchi / (Hungary) Adrienn Nagy (champions)
4. (Spain) Marta Custic / (Malta) Helene Pellicano (quarterfinals)
5. (China) Wang Jiaqi / (China) Zheng Qinwen (first round)
6. (Russia) Elina Avanesyan / (Russia) Anastasia Tikhonova (second round)
7. (France) Loudmilla Bencheikh / (Malta) Francesca Curmi (semifinals)
8. (United States) Chloe Beck / (United States) Emma Navarro (final)

== Draw ==
Key

- Q = Qualifier
- WC = Wild card
- LL = Lucky loser
- Alt = Alternate
- ITF = ITF entry
- PR = Protected ranking
- SR = Special ranking
- SE = Special exempt
- JE = Junior exempt
- JR = Junior Accelerator Programme entrant
- CO = College Accelerator Programme entrant
- NG = Next Gen Accelerator Program entrant
- w/o = Walkover
- r = Retired
- d = Defaulted

=== Finals ===
Semifinals
(Russia) Daria Frayman (Italy) Federica Rossi	6^{2}	6^{3}
8	(United States) Chloe Beck (United States) Emma Navarro	7^{7}	7^{7}
3	(Japan) Natsumi Kawaguchi (Hungary) Adrienn Nagy	6	2	[10]
7	(France) Loudmilla Bencheikh (Malta) Francesca Curmi	4	6	[7]

Final
8	(United States) Chloe Beck (United States) Emma Navarro	4	4
3	(Japan) Natsumi Kawaguchi (Hungary) Adrienn Nagy	6	6

=== Top half ===
First round
1	(South Korea) Park So-hyun (Hong Kong) Cody Wong Hong-yi	6	6
(Italy) Alice Amendola (Georgia (country)) Zoziya Kardava	4	1
(France) Manon Léonard (Italy) Lisa Pigato	4	4
(Russia) Daria Frayman (Italy) Federica Rossi	6	6
(Poland) Martyna Kubka (Poland) Stefania Rogozińska Dzik	3	3
WC	(Australia) Olivia Gadecki (Australia) Megan Smith	6	6
(Italy) Martina Biagianti (Spain) Carlota Martínez Círez	2	6	[4]
6	(Russia) Elina Avanesyan (Russia) Anastasia Tikhonova	6	4	[10]
4	(Spain) Marta Custic (Malta) Helene Pellicano	6	6
(Canada) Leylah Annie Fernandez (United States) Sasha Wood	1	4
(Japan) Saki Imamura (South Korea) Ku Yeon-woo	5	2
(Russia) Veronika Pepelyaeva (Russia) Avelina Sayfetdinova	7	6
WC	(Australia) Charlotte Kempenaers-Pocz (Australia) Taylah Lawless	4	1
(Japan) Mana Kawamura (Japan) Funa Kozaki	6	6
Alt	(Finland) Alexandra Anttila (United States) Skyler Marie Grace Grishuk	4	4
8	(United States) Chloe Beck (United States) Emma Navarro	6	6

Second round
1	(South Korea) S-h Park (Hong Kong) CH-y Wong	4	6	[8]
(Russia) D Frayman (Italy) F Rossi	6	4	[10]
WC	(Australia) O Gadecki (Australia) M Smith	6	0	[10]
6	(Russia) E Avanesyan (Russia) A Tikhonova	2	6	[8]
4	(Spain) M Custic (Malta) H Pellicano	6	6
(Russia) V Pepelyaeva (Russia) A Sayfetdinova	2	4
(Japan) M Kawamura (Japan) F Kozaki	3	4
8	(United States) C Beck (United States) E Navarro	6	6

Quarterfinals
(Russia) D Frayman (Italy) F Rossi	6	7^{7}
WC	(Australia) O Gadecki (Australia) M Smith	2	6^{3}
4	(Spain) M Custic (Malta) H Pellicano	6	2	[6]
8	(United States) C Beck (United States) E Navarro	3	6	[10]

Semifinals
(Russia) D Frayman (Italy) F Rossi	6^{2}	6^{3}
8	(United States) C Beck (United States) E Navarro	7^{7}	7^{7}

=== Bottom half ===
First round
5	(China) Wang Jiaqi (China) Zheng Qinwen	0	2
(Burundi) Sada Nahimana (Japan) Moyuka Uchijima	6	6
(Sweden) Caijsa Hennemann (Switzerland) Valentina Ryser	7	6
WC	(Australia) Roopa Bains (Australia) Natasha Russell	5	3
(Russia) Polina Kudermetova (Russia) Mariia Tkacheva	6	4	[6]
(United Kingdom) Victoria Allen (United Kingdom) Destinee Martins	4	6	[10]
WC	(Australia) Anastasia Berezov (Australia) Talia Gibson	3	4
3	(Japan) Natsumi Kawaguchi (Hungary) Adrienn Nagy	6	6
7	(France) Loudmilla Bencheikh (Malta) Francesca Curmi	2	6	[10]
(Australia) Amber Marshall (Australia) Annerly Poulos	6	4	[8]
(New Zealand) Valentina Ivanov (Northern Mariana Islands) Carol Young Suh Lee	6^{4}	7	[5]
(Russia) Maria Krupenina (Ukraine) Daria Snigur	7^{7}	5	[10]
(United States) Kylie Collins (United States) Kacie Harvey	6	4	[6]
(Latvia) Kamilla Bartone (France) Giulia Morlet	1	6	[10]
(Indonesia) Priska Madelyn Nugroho (China) Wei Sijia	0	2
2	(Thailand) Thasaporn Naklo (Thailand) Mananchaya Sawangkaew	6	6

Second round
(Burundi) S Nahimana (Japan) M Uchijima	6	6
(Sweden) C Hennemann (Switzerland) V Ryser	0	4
(United Kingdom) V Allen (United Kingdom) D Martins	3	0
3	(Japan) N Kawaguchi (Hungary) A Nagy	6	6
7	(France) L Bencheikh (Malta) F Curmi	5	7^{7}	[10]
(Russia) M Krupenina (Ukraine) D Snigur	7	6^{4}	[8]
(Latvia) K Bartone (France) G Morlet	5	6^{5}
2	(Thailand) T Naklo (Thailand) M Sawangkaew	7	7^{7}

Quarterfinals
(Burundi) S Nahimana (Japan) M Uchijima	2	6^{2}
3	(Japan) N Kawaguchi (Hungary) A Nagy	6	7^{7}
7	(France) L Bencheikh (Malta) F Curmi	7^{7}	4	[10]
2	(Thailand) T Naklo (Thailand) M Sawangkaew	6^{5}	6	[7]

Semifinals
3	(Japan) N Kawaguchi (Hungary) A Nagy	6	2	[10]
7	(France) L Bencheikh (Malta) F Curmi	4	6	[7]
