= Ben Weekes =

Australian wheelchair tennis player

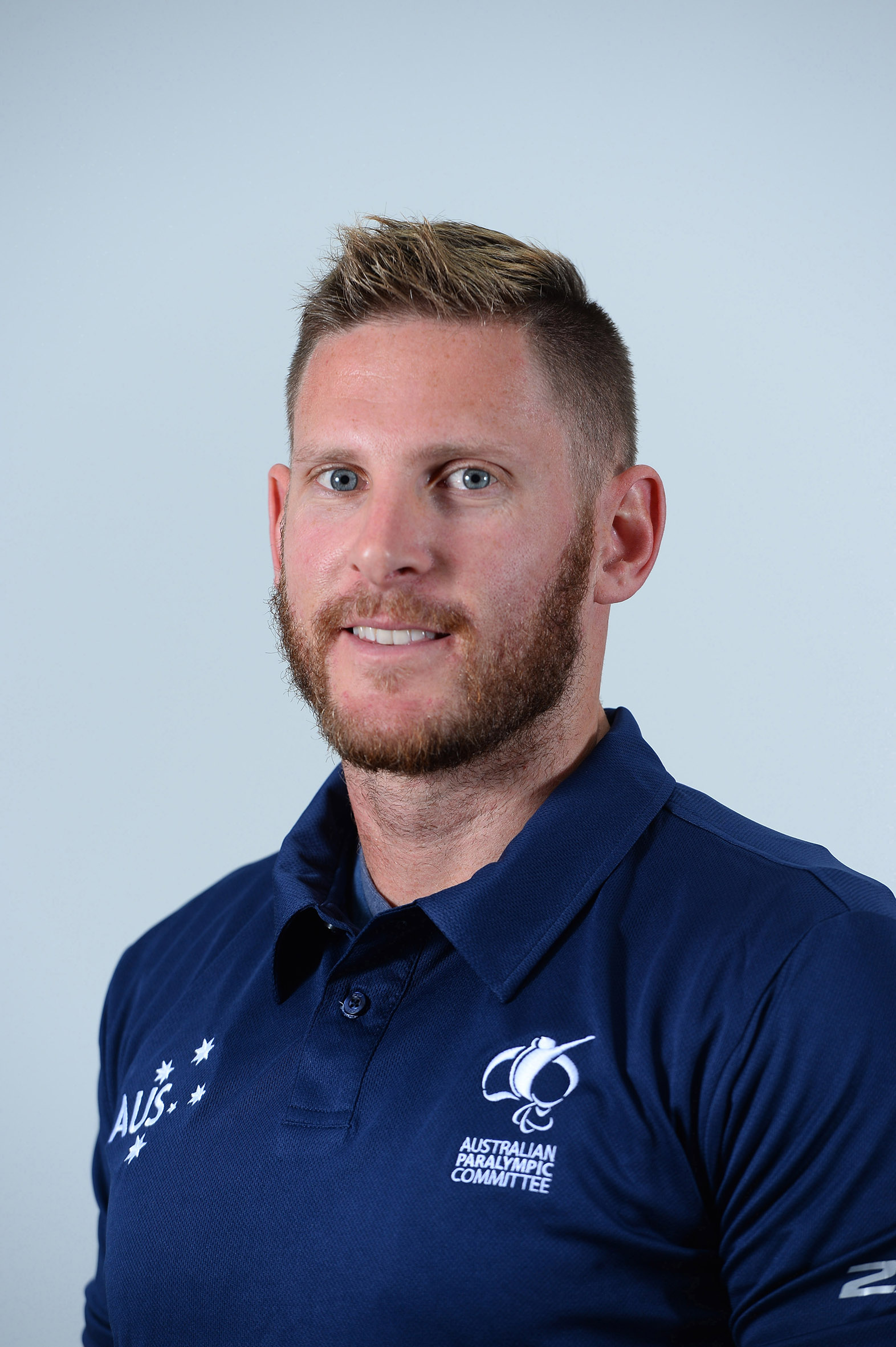
- 2016 Australian Paralympic team portrait
- Country (sports): Australia
- Born: 20 September 1984 (age 42)
- Official website: www.benweekestennis.com

Grand Slam singles results
- Australian Open: QF (2009, 2010, 2011, 2012, 2017, 2019, 2020, 2021, 2022)

Grand Slam doubles results
- Australian Open: F (2019)

Ben Weekes (born 20 September 1984) is an Australian wheelchair tennis player. He competed at the 2024 Paris Paralympics, his sixth Games.

== Personal ==
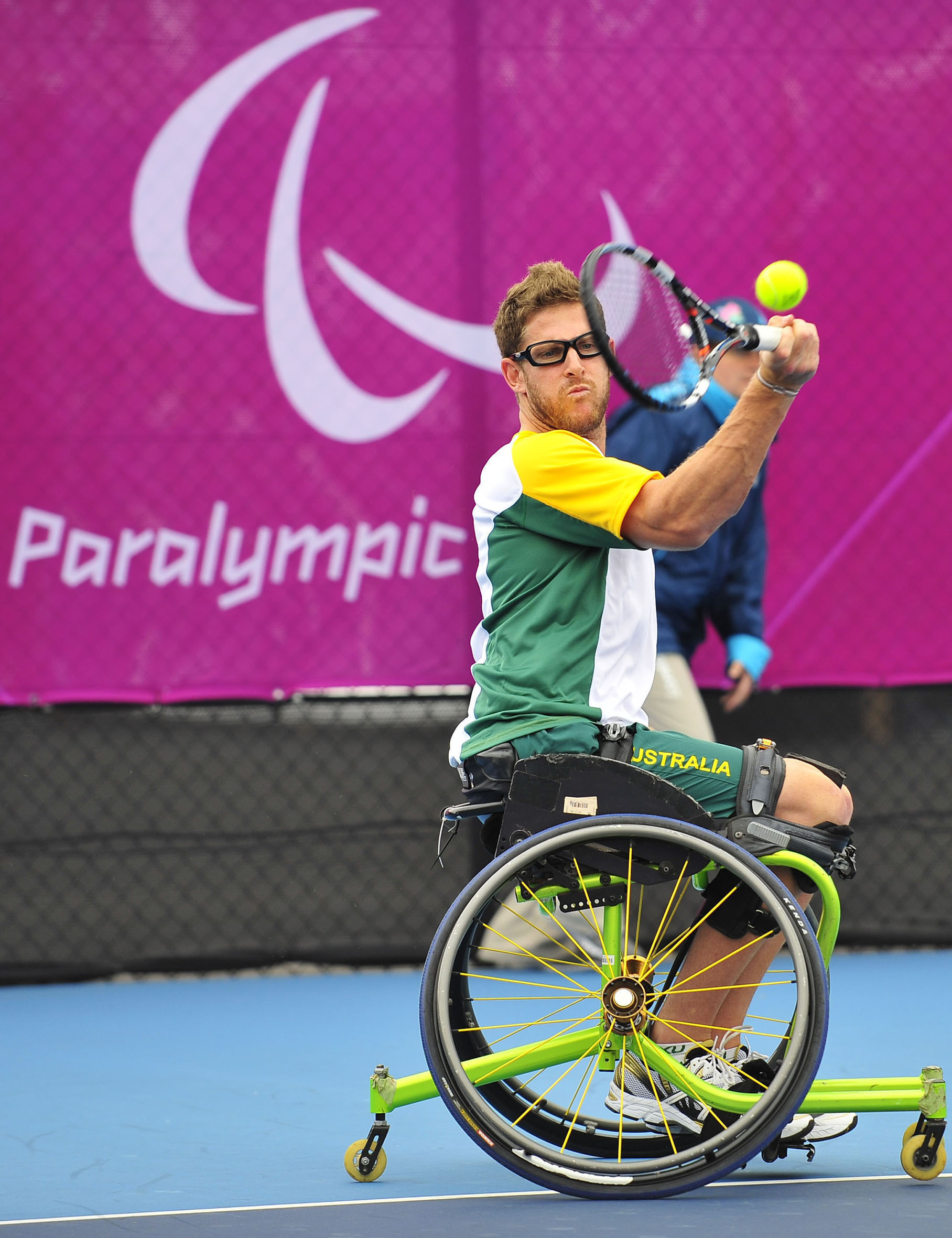
Weekes at the 2012 London Paralympics

Weekes was born on 20 September 1984 in Strathfield, New South Wales. He has an identical twin brother, and two other brothers. He is an incomplete paraplegic as a result of a blood clot forming in his spine when he was thirteen years old. He is a composer and pianist, having received formal training in this area. His music has been recorded and he has played at the BarMe Cabaret Bar, Angel Place and the Sydney Opera House.

Other sports he participates in are swimming and basketball.

Weekes is openly gay.

== Tennis ==
Weekes is a wheelchair tennis player. When playing, he follows the same rules as his non-disabled counterparts except the ball is allowed to bounce twice. He became interested in the sport after watching David Hall play it at the 2000 Summer Paralympics, and would go on to practice regularly with Hall, until Hall retired from the sport in 2006. He has been coached by Kathy Fahim.

Weekes first represented Australia in 2002. That year, he competed in the Junior World Cup where he finished second. At the 2004 World Cup, his team finished second. He competed at the 2004 Summer Paralympics in Athens. He won his first-round match, and was knocked out in the second round.

Weekes competed at the 2008 Summer Paralympics, playing doubles with Michael Dobbie. Going into the 2008 Games, he practised twice a day on court, six times a week. In 2008, Weekes played some doubles matches with Adam Kellerman.

At the 2011 South African Open, he made the finals. At the 2012 Summer Paralympics, he made the second round of the men's singles and he teamed with Adam Kellerman in the men's doubles. They lost in the first round. In the doubles event, he is due to be partnered by Adam Kellerman.

At the 2016 Rio Paralympics, Weekes lost to Stefan Olsson (SWE) 0-2 (0–6, 3–6) in the round of 32 in the Men's Singles and with Adam Kellerman lost in the round of 16 in the Men's Doubles.

At the 2020 Tokyo Paralympics, Weekes lost in the Round of 32 in the Men's Singles and Doubles. At the 2024 Paris Paralympics, he lost in the round of 64 in the Men's Singles and round of 32 with Anderson Parker in Men's Doubles.
