= Zoziya Kardava =

Georgian tennis player

Zoziya Kardava ზოზია ქარდავა
- Country (sports): Georgia
- Born: 15 July 2001 (age 25) Tula, Russia
- Plays: Right-handed
- Prize money: $38,114

Singles
- Career record: 96–113
- Career titles: 2 ITF
- Highest ranking: No. 668 (15 September 2025)
- Current ranking: No. 729 (11 August 2025)

Grand Slam singles results
- Australian Open Junior: Q2 (2019)
- French Open Junior: Q1 (2019)

Doubles
- Career record: 49–69
- Career titles: 1 ITF
- Highest ranking: No. 723 (14 November 2022)
- Current ranking: No. 932 (11 August 2025)

Grand Slam doubles results
- Australian Open Junior: 1R (2018, 2019)

Team competitions
- Fed Cup: 8–7
- Last updated on: 11 August 2025.

Zoziya Kardava (Georgian: ზოზია ქარდავა; born 15 July 2001) is a Georgian tennis player.

Kardava has a career-high singles ranking by the Women's Tennis Association (WTA) of 689, achieved on 23 June 2025. She also has a career-high WTA doubles ranking of 723, achieved on 14 November 2022. Kardava has won two titles in singles and one title in doubles on the ITF Women's Circuit.

Kardava represents Georgia in Fed Cup competition.

== ITF Circuit finals ==
=== Singles: 3 (2 titles, 1 runner-up) ===
Legend W15 tournaments	Finals by surface Hard (1–1) Clay (1–0)

Result	W–L	Date	Tournament	Tier	Surface	Opponent	Score
Win	1–0	Jul 2018	Telavi Open, Georgia	W15	Clay	(Russia) Vasilisa Aponasenko	6–2, 6–2
Win	2–0	Sep 2024	ITF Sharm El Sheikh, Egypt	W15	Hard	(Sweden) Jacqueline Cabaj Awad	2–6, 7–5, 6–2
Loss	2–1	Aug 2026	ITF Logroño, Spain	W15	Hard	(Spain) Juliana Giaccio	3–6, 2–6

=== Doubles: 5 (1 title, 4 runner-ups) ===
Legend W15 tournaments	Finals by surface Hard (0–1) Clay (1–3)

Result	W–L	Date	Tournament	Tier	Surface	Partner	Opponents	Score
Loss	0–1	Sep 2019	ITF Cairo, Egypt	W15	Clay	(Japan) Minami Akiyama	(Netherlands) Dominique Karregat (Netherlands) Sem Wensveen	1–6, 6–4, [4–10]
Win	1–1	Feb 2020	ITF Antalya, Turkey	W15	Clay	(Kazakhstan) Gozal Ainitdinova	(Colombia) María Herazo González (Colombia) Yuliana Lizarazo	6–7^{(4)}, 7–6^{(1)}, [12–10]
Loss	1–2	Nov 2021	ITF Antalya, Turkey	W15	Clay	(Russia) Anna Chekanskaya	(South Korea) Back Da-yeon (China) Tian Fangran	5–7, 3–6
Loss	1–3	Oct 2022	ITF Antalya, Turkey	W15	Clay	(Czech Republic) Denise Hrdinková	Anna Ureke; Valeriya Yushchenko	0–6, 6–4, [7–10]
Loss	1–4	May 2026	ITF Hurghada, Egypt	W15	Hard	Ulyana Hrabavets	(Egypt) Aya El Sayed (Egypt) Nada Fouad	7–6^{(1)}, 4–6, [2–10]
