= Salsa Aher =

Indian tennis player

Salsa Parag Aher
Personal information
- Nickname: Sals
- Born: 12 June 2001 (age 25) Pune
- Home town: Pune

Sport
- Country: India
- Sport: Tennis
- Rank: National Ranking, U-18 No. 1
- Coached by: Hemant Bendrey and Kedar Shah

Achievements and titles
- World finals: 186 in ITF juniors
- Highest world ranking: 186

Salsa Aher is an Indian tennis player from Pune, India. In 2019 she became the top-ranked junior player in India. She was introduced to tennis at the young age of 6 years by her father. She plays left-handed. She is currently pursuing studies at the University of Nevada, Las Vegas and is a part of the women's tennis team of UNLV Rebels.

== Career ==
Salsa, who hails from Pune and is a student of Symbiosis College of Art and Commerce, started playing tennis from the age of 6 years. Her mother quit her job so she could support Salsa to train and excel in tennis. She trains at the Bounce Sports Academy in Pune under the guidance of Kedar Shah.

In 2016, she won Fenesta Open in Delhi which is regarded as the highest ranking All India Tennis Association tournament in India. She represented India in Women's Tennis Association (WTA) Future Stars, 2017 in Singapore where she won all her round robin matches and reached the semi-finals. She secured the runner-up position at ITF Junior, 2017 in Thailand.

She was also a part of 2nd HCL Asian B1 Junior Tennis Championship held in Pune, 2018. Salsa, also took part in 2019 Australian Open and won the first round of qualifiers but was eliminated by Federica Rossi of Italy in the Qualifying Competition. Recently, in December 2018, she won the Singles International Tennis Federation (ITF) Juniors Title in Pune. According to the ranking list of All India Tennis Association 29 April 2019, Salsa is currently ranked India no. 1 in U-18 Girls Category.
