= 2019 Australian Open – Wheelchair women's singles =

Wheelchair women's singles
- 2019 Australian Open

Final
- Champion: (Netherlands) Diede de Groot
- Runner-up: (Japan) Yui Kamiji
- Score: 6–0, 6–2

Events
Singles	men	women		boys	girls
Doubles	men	women	mixed	boys	girls
WC Singles	men	women	quad
WC Doubles	men	women	quad
Legends	men	women	mixed
← 2018 ·	Australian Open	· 2020 →

Defending champion Diede de Groot defeated Yui Kamiji in the final, 6–0, 6–2 to win the women's singles wheelchair tennis title at the 2019 Australian Open. It was her third step towards a non-calendar-year Grand Slam.

== Seeds ==
1. (Netherlands) Diede de Groot (champion)
2. (Japan) Yui Kamiji (final)

== Draw ==
=== Key ===
- Q = Qualifier
- WC = Wild card
- LL = Lucky loser
- Alt = Alternate
- ITF = ITF entry
- PR = Protected ranking
- SR = Special ranking
- SE = Special exempt
- JE = Junior exempt
- JR = Junior Accelerator Programme entrant
- CO = College Accelerator Programme entrant
- NG = Next Gen Accelerator Program entrant
- w/o = Walkover
- r = Retired
- d = Defaulted

=== Draw ===
First round
1	(Netherlands) Diede de Groot	6	6
(United Kingdom) Lucy Shuker	0	0
(Netherlands) Marjolein Buis	6	6
(Germany) Sabine Ellerbrock	1	4
(Netherlands) Aniek van Koot	6	7
(South Africa) Kgothatso Montjane	1	5
(Italy) Giulia Capocci	6^{3}	3
2	(Japan) Yui Kamiji	7^{7}	6

Semifinals
1	(Netherlands) Diede de Groot	6	6
(Netherlands) Marjolein Buis	3	2
(Netherlands) Aniek van Koot	1	4
2	(Japan) Yui Kamiji	6	6

Final
1	(Netherlands) Diede de Groot	6	6
2	(Japan) Yui Kamiji	0	2
