= 2019 Australian Open – Wheelchair men's doubles =

Wheelchair men's doubles
- 2019 Australian Open

Final
- Champion: (Belgium) Joachim Gérard (Sweden) Stefan Olsson
- Runner-up: (France) Stéphane Houdet (Australia) Ben Weekes
- Score: 6–3, 6–2

Events
Singles	men	women		boys	girls
Doubles	men	women	mixed	boys	girls
WC Singles	men	women	quad
WC Doubles	men	women	quad
Legends	men	women	mixed
← 2018 ·	Australian Open	· 2020 →

Joachim Gérard and Stefan Olsson defeated the defending champion Stéphane Houdet and his partner Ben Weekes in the final, 6–3, 6–2 to win the men's doubles wheelchair tennis title at the 2019 Australian Open.

Houdet and Nicolas Peifer were the reigning champions, but Peifer did not participate.

== Seeds ==
1. (United Kingdom) Alfie Hewett / (United Kingdom) Gordon Reid (first round)
2. (Belgium) Joachim Gérard / (Sweden) Stefan Olsson (champions)

== Draw ==
=== Key ===
- Q = Qualifier
- WC = Wild card
- LL = Lucky loser
- Alt = Alternate
- ITF = ITF entry
- PR = Protected ranking
- SR = Special ranking
- SE = Special exempt
- JE = Junior exempt
- JR = Junior Accelerator Programme entrant
- CO = College Accelerator Programme entrant
- NG = Next Gen Accelerator Program entrant
- w/o = Walkover
- r = Retired
- d = Defaulted

=== Draw ===
First round
1	(United Kingdom) Alfie Hewett (United Kingdom) Gordon Reid	2	5
(France) Stéphane Houdet (Australia) Ben Weekes	6	7
(Argentina) Gustavo Fernández (Japan) Shingo Kunieda	2	6^{4}
2	(Belgium) Joachim Gérard (Sweden) Stefan Olsson	6	7^{7}

Final
(France) Stéphane Houdet (Australia) Ben Weekes	3	2
2	(Belgium) Joachim Gérard (Sweden) Stefan Olsson	6	6
