= Helene Pellicano =

Maltese tennis player

- Country (sports): Malta
- Born: 17 April 2002 (age 22)
- Plays: Right (two-handed backhand)
- Prize money: $11,766

Singles
- Career record: 77–61
- Career titles: 0
- Highest ranking: No. 710 (18 March 2019)

Grand Slam singles results
- Australian Open Junior: 1R (2019)
- French Open Junior: 2R (2019)
- US Open Junior: 1R (2019)

Doubles
- Career record: 0–4
- Career titles: 0

Team competitions
- Fed Cup: 11–5

Helene Pellicano (born 17 April 2002) is a Maltese tennis player.

== Career ==
Pellicano has a career-high singles ranking by the WTA of 710, achieved on 18 March 2019.

Playing for Malta in the Fed Cup, she has win–loss record of 11–5.

On 18 March 2019, Pellicano became Malta's highest ever ranked women's singles player.
