= 2019 Australian Open – Girls' singles =

Girls' singles
- 2019 Australian Open
- Final date: 26 January 2019

Final
- Champion: (Denmark) Clara Tauson
- Runner-up: (Canada) Leylah Fernandez
- Score: 6–4, 6–3

Events
Singles	men	women		boys	girls
Doubles	men	women	mixed	boys	girls
WC Singles	men	women	quad
WC Doubles	men	women	quad
Legends	men	women	mixed
- Australian Open

Clara Tauson won the girls' singles tennis title at the 2019 Australian Open, defeating Leylah Fernandez in the final, 6–4, 6–3.

Liang En-shuo was the defending champion, but she participated in the women's qualifying competition where she lost to Bibiane Schoofs in the first round.

== Seeds ==
1. (Denmark) Clara Tauson (champion)
2. (China) Zheng Qinwen (second round)
3. (France) Diane Parry (withdrew)
4. (Canada) Leylah Fernandez (final)
5. (Thailand) Mananchaya Sawangkaew (quarterfinals)
6. (United States) Lea Ma (second round)
7. (Switzerland) Lulu Sun (quarterfinals)
8. (South Korea) Park So-hyun (second round)
9. (Latvia) Kamilla Bartone (quarterfinals)
10. (Hong Kong) Cody Wong Hong-yi (first round)
11. (Hungary) Adrienn Nagy (third round)
12. (Thailand) Thasaporn Naklo (second round)
13. (Russia) Mariia Tkacheva (first round)
14. (Burundi) Sada Nahimana (first round)
15. (Spain) Marta Custic (second round)
16. (United Kingdom) Emma Raducanu (first round)
17. (France) Loudmilla Bencheikh (second round)

Click on the seed number of a player to go to their draw section.

== Draw ==
Key

- Q = Qualifier
- WC = Wild card
- LL = Lucky loser
- Alt = Alternate
- ITF = ITF entry
- PR = Protected ranking
- SR = Special ranking
- SE = Special exempt
- JE = Junior exempt
- JR = Junior Accelerator Programme entrant
- CO = College Accelerator Programme entrant
- NG = Next Gen Accelerator Program entrant
- w/o = Walkover
- r = Retired
- d = Defaulted

=== Finals ===
Quarterfinals
1	(Denmark) Clara Tauson	6	6
9	(Latvia) Kamilla Bartone	2	3
(Ukraine) Daria Snigur	6	6
5	(Thailand) Mananchaya Sawangkaew	4	4
(France) Manon Léonard	3	1
4	(Canada) Leylah Fernandez	6	6
7	(Switzerland) Lulu Sun	6^{1}	6	4
(Russia) Anastasia Tikhonova	7^{7}	4	6

Semifinals
1	(Denmark) Clara Tauson	6	6
(Ukraine) Daria Snigur	4	1
4	(Canada) Leylah Fernandez	6	6
(Russia) Anastasia Tikhonova	1	3

Final
1	(Denmark) Clara Tauson	6	6
4	(Canada) Leylah Fernandez	4	3

=== Top half ===
==== Section 1 ====
First round
1	(Denmark) Clara Tauson	1	6	6
WC	(Australia) Anastasia Berezov	6	3	1
(China) Wei Sijia	6	7^{7}
(Belarus) Viktoryia Kanapatskaya	3	6^{5}
(Poland) Stefania Rogozińska Dzik	6	6
WC	(Australia) Charlotte Kempenaers-Pocz	3	4
(Switzerland) Valentina Ryser	6	6
13	(Russia) Mariia Tkacheva	4	4
9	(Latvia) Kamilla Bartone	6	6
LL	(United States) Sasha Wood	0	2
(Japan) Funa Kozaki	4	7^{7}	1
WC	(Australia) Olivia Gadecki	6	6^{4}	6
(Indonesia) Priska Madelyn Nugroho	6	6^{7}	6
WC	(South Korea) Ku Yeon-woo	3	7^{9}	4
(Russia) Elina Avanesyan	2	7	2
6	(United States) Lea Ma	6	5	6

Second round
1	(Denmark) C Tauson	7^{8}	6
(China) S Wei	6^{6}	2
(Poland) S Rogozińska Dzik	7^{8}	6^{10}	1
(Switzerland) V Ryser	6^{6}	7^{12}	6
9	(Latvia) K Bartone	7^{7}	4	6
WC	(Australia) O Gadecki	6^{4}	6	3
(Indonesia) PM Nugroho	5	6	6
6	(United States) L Ma	7	3	0

Third round
1	(Denmark) C Tauson	6	7
(Switzerland) V Ryser	2	5
9	(Latvia) K Bartone	6	3	6
(Indonesia) PM Nugroho	3	6	3

Quarterfinals
1	(Denmark) C Tauson	6	6
9	(Latvia) K Bartone	2	3

==== Section 2 ====
First round
17	(France) Loudmilla Bencheikh	6	6
WC	(Australia) Megan Smith	4	2
(Ukraine) Daria Snigur	6	6
(Italy) Martina Biagianti	1	2
(United States) Emma Navarro	6	6
(China) Wang Jiaqi	2	2
(Japan) Himari Sato	6	7
16	(United Kingdom) Emma Raducanu	2	5
11	(Hungary) Adrienn Nagy	6	6
(Malta) Helene Pellicano	3	1
(Japan) Natsumi Kawaguchi	5	6	5
(Russia) Daria Frayman	7	4	7
(Spain) Carlota Martínez Círez	4	7^{7}	6
WC	(Australia) Talia Gibson	6	6^{3}	1
Q	(New Zealand) Valentina Ivanov	4	4
5	(Thailand) Mananchaya Sawangkaew	6	6

Second round
17	(France) L Bencheikh	4	6^{8}
(Ukraine) D Snigur	6	7^{10}
(United States) E Navarro	6	6
(Japan) H Sato	1	3
11	(Hungary) A Nagy	6	2	7^{10}
(Russia) D Frayman	2	6	6^{7}
(Spain) C Martínez Círez	7^{7}	2	2
5	(Thailand) M Sawangkaew	6^{3}	6	6

Third round
(Ukraine) D Snigur	3	6	6
(United States) E Navarro	6	4	2
11	(Hungary) A Nagy	2	4
5	(Thailand) M Sawangkaew	6	6

Quarterfinals
(Ukraine) D Snigur	6	6
5	(Thailand) M Sawangkaew	4	4

=== Bottom half ===
==== Section 3 ====
First round
8	(South Korea) Park So-hyun	6	5	6
Q	(Northern Mariana Islands) Carol Young Suh Lee	1	7	4
(France) Manon Léonard	1	7	6
WC	(Australia) Taylah Lawless	6	5	3
Q	(Japan) Saki Imamura	6	3	2
Q	(Russia) Veronika Pepelyaeva	2	6	6
(United Kingdom) Destinee Martins	6	6
10	(Hong Kong) Cody Wong Hong-yi	4	3
15	(Spain) Marta Custic	6	6
Q	(Russia) Maria Krupenina	4	2
WC	(Australia) Lara Walker	2	4
Q	(Italy) Lisa Pigato	6	6
(Japan) Moyuka Uchijima	6	6
Q	(Poland) Martyna Kubka	1	4
(United States) Kylie Collins	3	2
4	(Canada) Leylah Fernandez	6	6

Second round
8	(South Korea) S-h Park	4	3
(France) M Léonard	6	6
Q	(Russia) V Pepelyaeva	2	7	6
(United Kingdom) D Martins	6	5	3
15	(Spain) M Custic	6	4	3
Q	(Italy) L Pigato	3	6	6
(Japan) M Uchijima	4	6^{5}
4	(Canada) L Fernandez	6	7^{7}

Third round
(France) M Léonard	6	6^{4}	6
Q	(Russia) V Pepelyaeva	3	7^{7}	4
Q	(Italy) L Pigato	3	5
4	(Canada) L Fernandez	6	7

Quarterfinals
(France) M Léonard	3	1
4	(Canada) L Fernandez	6	6

==== Section 4 ====
First round
7	(Switzerland) Lulu Sun	6	6
(Sweden) Caijsa Hennemann	4	3
(Japan) Mana Kawamura	4	5
(Australia) Amber Marshall	6	7
Q	(Italy) Federica Rossi	6	6
(United States) Kacie Harvey	4	3
(France) Giulia Morlet	1	4
12	(Thailand) Thasaporn Naklo	6	6
14	(Burundi) Sada Nahimana	6	4	1
(United Kingdom) Victoria Allen	4	6	6
(Malta) Francesca Curmi	1	6	2
(Australia) Annerly Poulos	6	0	6
(Russia) Anastasia Tikhonova	7	6
(France) Yasmine Mansouri	5	2
(United States) Chloe Beck	7^{7}	3	4
2	(China) Zheng Qinwen	6^{5}	6	6

Second round
7	(Switzerland) L Sun	6	6
(Australia) A Marshall	4	0
Q	(Italy) F Rossi	6	2	6
12	(Thailand) T Naklo	2	6	1
(United Kingdom) V Allen	2	6	7^{10}
(Australia) A Poulos	6	2	6^{6}
(Russia) A Tikhonova	7	6
2	(China) Q Zheng	5	3

Third round
7	(Switzerland) L Sun	4	6	6
Q	(Italy) F Rossi	6	2	4
(United Kingdom) V Allen	6^{5}	4
(Russia) A Tikhonova	7^{7}	6

Quarterfinals
7	(Switzerland) L Sun	6^{1}	6	4
(Russia) A Tikhonova	7^{7}	4	6

== Qualifying ==
=== Seeds ===
1. (United States) Skyler Marie Grace Grishuk (qualifying competition)
2. (Italy) Federica Rossi (qualified)
3. (Russia) Polina Kudermetova (qualifying competition)
4. (Georgia (country)) Zoziya Kardava (qualifying competition)
5. (Poland) Martyna Kubka (qualified)
6. (Italy) Alice Amendola (first round)
7. (Russia) Avelina Sayfetdinova (first round)
8. (Russia) Veronika Pepelyaeva (qualified)
9. (Japan) Saki Imamura (qualified)
10. (Italy) Lisa Pigato (qualified)
11. (New Zealand) Valentina Ivanov (qualified)
12. (India) Shivani Amineni (first round)
13. (United States) Sasha Wood (qualifying competition; lucky loser)
14. (Indonesia) Janice Tjen (first round)
15. (Northern Mariana Islands) Carol Young Suh Lee (qualified)
16. (Finland) Alexandra Anttila (first round)

=== Qualifiers ===
1. (Italy) Lisa Pigato
2. (Italy) Federica Rossi
3. (New Zealand) Valentina Ivanov
4. (Japan) Saki Imamura
5. (Poland) Martyna Kubka
6. (Russia) Maria Krupenina
7. (Northern Mariana Islands) Carol Young Suh Lee
8. (Russia) Veronika Pepelyaeva

=== Lucky loser ===
1. (United States) Sasha Wood

=== Draw ===
==== First qualifier ====
First round
1	(United States) Skyler Marie Grace Grishuk	6	6
WC	(Australia) Mia Repac	4	1
(Russia) Maria Bondarenko	6	6^{4}	4
10	(Italy) Lisa Pigato	1	7^{7}	6

Qualifying competition
1	(United States) Skyler Marie Grace Grishuk	1	3
10	(Italy) Lisa Pigato	6	6

==== Second qualifier ====
First round
2	(Italy) Federica Rossi	6	6
(Japan) Shiori Ito	1	2
(India) Salsa Aher	6	4	6
16	(Finland) Alexandra Anttila	1	6	3

Qualifying competition
2	(Italy) Federica Rossi	6	6
(India) Salsa Aher	1	1

==== Third qualifier ====
First round
3	(Russia) Polina Kudermetova	6	6
WC	(Australia) Olivia Symons	1	3
(United States) Dakota Fordham	1	1
11	(New Zealand) Valentina Ivanov	6	6

Qualifying competition
3	(Russia) Polina Kudermetova	6	1	4
11	(New Zealand) Valentina Ivanov	1	6	6

==== Fourth qualifier ====
First round
4	(Georgia (country)) Zoziya Kardava	6	6
(South Africa) Megan Basson	3	2
WC	(Australia) Roopa Bains	2	3
9	(Japan) Saki Imamura	6	6

Qualifying competition
4	(Georgia (country)) Zoziya Kardava	1	3
9	(Japan) Saki Imamura	6	6

==== Fifth qualifier ====
First round
5	(Poland) Martyna Kubka	6	6
(Australia) Tina Nadine Smith	2	2
WC	(Japan) Erika Matsuda	5	3
13	(United States) Sasha Wood	7	6

Qualifying competition
5	(Poland) Martyna Kubka	6	6
13	(United States) Sasha Wood	1	2

==== Sixth qualifier ====
First round
6	(Italy) Alice Amendola	2	6	1
(Russia) Maria Krupenina	6	3	6
WC	(Australia) Tayla Whitehouse	3	7	7^{10}
12	(India) Shivani Amineni	6	5	6^{3}

Qualifying competition
(Russia) Maria Krupenina	6	0
WC	(Australia) Tayla Whitehouse	3	0^{r}

==== Seventh qualifier ====
First round
7	(Russia) Avelina Sayfetdinova	6^{3}	6	2
WC	(Australia) Natasha Russell	7^{7}	4	6
(South Africa) Myah Petchey	1	4
15	(Northern Mariana Islands) Carol Young Suh Lee	6	6

Qualifying competition
WC	(Australia) Natasha Russell	6^{5}	2
15	(Northern Mariana Islands) Carol Young Suh Lee	7^{7}	6

==== Eighth qualifier ====
First round
8	(Russia) Veronika Pepelyaeva	0	6	7
(Japan) Koharu Niimi	6	4	5
(Australia) Grace Schumacher	6	6
14	(Indonesia) Janice Tjen	2	4

Qualifying competition
8	(Russia) Veronika Pepelyaeva	4	6	7
(Australia) Grace Schumacher	6	2	5
