= 2019 Australian Open – Women's legends' doubles =

Women's legends' doubles
- 2019 Australian Open

Events
Singles	men	women		boys	girls
Doubles	men	women	mixed	boys	girls
WC Singles	men	women	quad
WC Doubles	men	women	quad
Legends	men	women	mixed
← 2018 ·	Australian Open	· 2020 →

== Draw ==
=== Key ===
- Q = Qualifier
- WC = Wild card
- LL = Lucky loser
- Alt = Alternate
- ITF = ITF entry
- PR = Protected ranking
- SR = Special ranking
- SE = Special exempt
- JE = Junior exempt
- JR = Junior Accelerator Programme entrant
- CO = College Accelerator Programme entrant
- NG = Next Gen Accelerator Program entrant
- w/o = Walkover
- r = Retired
- d = Defaulted

=== Group 1 ===
		(Slovakia) Hantuchová (United States) Navratilova	(United States) Davenport (Australia) Stubbs	(Belgium) Clijsters (China) Li	(Australia) Bradtke (United States) Fernández (Austria) Schett	RR; W–L	Set; W–L	Game; W–L	Standings
1	(Slovakia) Daniela Hantuchová (United States) Martina Navratilova		4–2, 4–2		4–3^{(5–0)}, 4–1 (w/ Schett)	2–0	4–0	16–8	1
2	(United States) Lindsay Davenport (Australia) Rennae Stubbs	2–4, 2–4		2–4, 3–4^{(4–5)}		0–2	0–4	9–16	3
3	(Belgium) Kim Clijsters (China) Li Na		4–2, 4–3^{(5–4)}		4–2, 4–3^{(5–3)} (w/ Bradtke)	2–0	4–0	16–10	2
4	(Australia) Nicole Bradtke (United States) Mary Joe Fernández (Austria) Barbara Schett	3–4^{(0–5)}, 1–4 (w/ Schett)		2–4, 3–4^{(3–5)} (w/ Bradtke)		0–2	0–4	9–16	3
