= 2019 Australian Open – Boys' singles =

Boys' singles
- 2019 Australian Open

Final
- Champion: (Italy) Lorenzo Musetti
- Runner-up: (United States) Emilio Nava
- Score: 4–6, 6–2, 7–6^{(14–12)}

Events
Singles	men	women		boys	girls
Doubles	men	women	mixed	boys	girls
WC Singles	men	women	quad
WC Doubles	men	women	quad
Legends	men	women	mixed
- Australian Open

Lorenzo Musetti won the boys' singles tennis title at the 2019 Australian Open, defeating Emilio Nava in the final, 4–6, 6–2, 7–6^{(14–12)}. He saved a championship point in the third-set tiebreak.

Sebastian Korda was the defending champion, but was no longer eligible to participate in junior events. He received a wildcard into the men's singles qualifying competition, where he lost to Go Soeda in the first round.

== Seeds ==
1. (Italy) Lorenzo Musetti (champion)
2. (China) Bu Yunchaokete (third round)
3. (Finland) Otto Virtanen (quarterfinals)
4. (Romania) Filip Cristian Jianu (semifinals)
5. (Australia) Rinky Hijikata (second round)
6. (Spain) Nicolás Álvarez Varona (quarterfinals)
7. (Czech Republic) Dalibor Svrčina (third round)
8. (Czech Republic) Jonáš Forejtek (third round)

9. (United States) Cannon Kingsley (quarterfinals)
10. (Belgium) Gauthier Onclin (first round)
11. (France) Valentin Royer (second round)
12. (United States) Tristan Boyer (first round)
13. (United States) Emilio Nava (final)
14. (France) Harold Mayot (second round)
15. (Canada) Liam Draxl (third round)
16. (United States) Eliot Spizzirri (second round)

Click on the seed number of a player to go to their draw section.

== Draw ==
Key

- Q = Qualifier
- WC = Wild card
- LL = Lucky loser
- Alt = Alternate
- ITF = ITF entry
- PR = Protected ranking
- SR = Special ranking
- SE = Special exempt
- JE = Junior exempt
- JR = Junior Accelerator Programme entrant
- CO = College Accelerator Programme entrant
- NG = Next Gen Accelerator Program entrant
- w/o = Walkover
- r = Retired
- d = Defaulted

=== Finals ===
Quarterfinals
1	(Italy) Lorenzo Musetti	7^{10}	7
6	(Spain) Nicolás Álvarez Varona	6^{8}	5
3	(Finland) Otto Virtanen	5	3
(Italy) Giulio Zeppieri	7	6
9	(United States) Cannon Kingsley	6^{5}	6	2
4	(Romania) Filip Cristian Jianu	7^{7}	4	6
(Czech Republic) Jiří Lehečka	6^{5}	6	2
13	(United States) Emilio Nava	7^{7}	4	6

Semifinals
1	(Italy) Lorenzo Musetti	6	6
(Italy) Giulio Zeppieri	2	4
4	(Romania) Filip Cristian Jianu	6	2	5
13	(United States) Emilio Nava	3	6	7

Final
1	(Italy) Lorenzo Musetti	4	6	7^{14}
13	(United States) Emilio Nava	6	2	6^{12}

=== Top half ===
==== Section 1 ====
First round
1	(Italy) Lorenzo Musetti	6	6
WC	(Australia) Tai Sach	4	0
(Vietnam) Nguyễn Văn Phương	6	4	6
(Hong Kong) Ng Ki-lung	4	6	3
WC	(Japan) Hikaru Takeda	2	3
(Brazil) Mateus Alves	6	6
(Romania) Nicholas David Ionel	3	4
15	(Canada) Liam Draxl	6	6
12	(United States) Tristan Boyer	6	6^{4}	3
(United Kingdom) Jacob Fearnley	3	7^{7}	6
WC	(Australia) Ken Cavrak	6	6
(Turkey) Bora Şengül	1	3
Q	(South Africa) Khololwam Montsi	3	5
(Russia) Alexandr Binda	6	7
(Belgium) Louis Herman	4	2
6	(Spain) Nicolás Álvarez Varona	6	6

Second round
1	(Italy) L Musetti	6	6
(Vietnam) PV Nguyễn	4	4
(Brazil) M Alves	5	4
15	(Canada) L Draxl	7	6
(United Kingdom) J Fearnley	6	7
WC	(Australia) K Cavrak	4	5
(Russia) A Binda	4	6^{1}
6	(Spain) N Álvarez Varona	6	7^{7}

Third round
1	(Italy) L Musetti	6	7
15	(Canada) L Draxl	4	5
(United Kingdom) J Fearnley	6	5	1
6	(Spain) N Álvarez Varona	4	7	6

Quarterfinals
1	(Italy) L Musetti	7^{10}	7
6	(Spain) N Álvarez Varona	6^{8}	5

==== Section 2 ====
First round
3	(Finland) Otto Virtanen	6	6^{6}	7^{10}
WC	(Australia) Stefan Storch	1	7^{8}	6^{6}
(Sweden) Gustaf Ström	6	6
Q	(Japan) Ryoma Matsushita	3	1
(Netherlands) Lodewijk Weststrate	6	6
WC	(Australia) Cooper White	2	2
Q	(United Kingdom) James Story	2	2
16	(United States) Eliot Spizzirri	6	6
11	(France) Valentin Royer	6	6
(Ukraine) Eric Vanshelboim	2	1
(United States) Tyler Zink	4	2
(Italy) Giulio Zeppieri	6	6
(Hungary) Péter Makk	4	6	6
(India) Mann Shah	6	0	2
(Australia) Dane Sweeny	3	0
8	(Czech Republic) Jonáš Forejtek	6	6

Second round
3	(Finland) O Virtanen	7	6
(Sweden) G Ström	5	1
(Netherlands) L Weststrate	7	6
16	(United States) E Spizzirri	5	4
11	(France) V Royer	4	1
(Italy) G Zeppieri	6	6
(Hungary) P Makk	4	4
8	(Czech Republic) J Forejtek	6	6

Third round
3	(Finland) O Virtanen	6	6^{11}	6
(Netherlands) L Weststrate	4	7^{13}	2
(Italy) G Zeppieri	6	6
8	(Czech Republic) J Forejtek	3	4

Quarterfinals
3	(Finland) O Virtanen	5	3
(Italy) G Zeppieri	7	6

=== Bottom half ===
==== Section 3 ====
First round
7	(Czech Republic) Dalibor Svrčina	6	7^{7}
(Brazil) Natan Rodrigues	0	6^{3}
(Italy) Francesco Passaro	6	3	5
(South Korea) Han Seon-yong	3	6	7
(Poland) Wojciech Marek	6	6
Q	(South Africa) Joubert Klopper	1	4
WC	(Australia) Tom Evans	1	4
9	(United States) Cannon Kingsley	6	6
14	(France) Harold Mayot	6	4	6
(Croatia) Admir Kalender	3	6	4
Q	(Japan) Ryuhei Azuma	4	6	1
(United States) Toby Kodat	6	1	6
WC	(Australia) Chen Dong	3	4
Q	(United Kingdom) Connor Thomson	6	6
(Italy) Matteo Arnaldi	3	4
4	(Romania) Filip Cristian Jianu	6	6

Second round
7	(Czech Republic) D Svrčina	6	6
(South Korea) S-y Han	4	0
(Poland) W Marek	1	2
9	(United States) C Kingsley	6	6
14	(France) H Mayot	2	7^{7}	6^{7}
(United States) T Kodat	6	6^{5}	7^{10}
Q	(United Kingdom) C Thomson	3	2
4	(Romania) FC Jianu	6	6

Third round
7	(Czech Republic) D Svrčina	2	5
9	(United States) C Kingsley	6	7
(United States) T Kodat	5	3
4	(Romania) FC Jianu	7	6

Quarterfinals
9	(United States) C Kingsley	6^{5}	6	2
4	(Romania) FC Jianu	7^{7}	4	6

==== Section 4 ====
First round
5	(Australia) Rinky Hijikata	6	6
Q	(France) Lilian Marmousez	3	4
(United States) Zane Khan	7^{10}	6^{1}	6
(Japan) Shunsuke Mitsui	6^{8}	7^{7}	2
(Netherlands) Christian Lerby	3	4
(Czech Republic) Jiří Lehečka	6	6
(United Kingdom) Harry Wendelken	7	6^{5}	7^{11}
10	(Belgium) Gauthier Onclin	5	7^{7}	6^{9}
13	(United States) Emilio Nava	6	6
(Japan) Keisuke Saitoh	4	2
Q	(Italy) Luciano Darderi	5	7^{7}	6
(Thailand) Thantub Suksumrarn	7	6^{3}	2
(Switzerland) Dominic Stricker	3	5
(Denmark) Holger Rune	6	7
WC	(Australia) Tristan Schoolkate	6	1	4
2	(China) Bu Yunchaokete	4	6	6

Second round
5	(Australia) R Hijikata	4	4
(United States) Z Khan	6	6
(Czech Republic) J Lehečka	6	6
(United Kingdom) H Wendelken	2	2
13	(United States) E Nava	6	7
Q	(Italy) L Darderi	1	5
(Denmark) HVN Rune	6^{4}	3
2	(China) Y Bu	7^{7}	6

Third round
(United States) Z Khan	6^{1}	4
(Czech Republic) J Lehečka	7^{7}	6
13	(United States) E Nava	6	3	6
2	(China) Y Bu	2	6	1

Quarterfinals
(Czech Republic) J Lehečka	6^{5}	6	2
13	(United States) E Nava	7^{7}	4	6

== Qualifying ==
Boys' singles
- 2019 Australian Open

Events
Singles	men	women		boys	girls
Doubles	men	women	mixed	boys	girls
WC Singles	men	women	quad
WC Doubles	men	women	quad
Legends	men	women	mixed
- Australian Open

This article displays the qualifying draw for Boys' singles at the 2019 Australian Open.

=== Seeds ===
1. (Romania) Cezar Crețu (qualifying competition)
2. (Russia) Egor Agafonov (qualifying competition)
3. (Romania) Nini Gabriel Dica (qualifying competition)
4. (France) Lilian Marmousez (qualified)
5. (Chinese Taipei) Tsai Chang-lin (qualifying competition)
6. (Italy) Fabrizio Andaloro (qualifying competition)
7. (Italy) Filippo Moroni (first round)
8. (Italy) Luciano Darderi (qualified)
9. (Brazil) João Ferreira (first round)
10. (Japan) Tomoya Ikeda (first round)
11. (United Kingdom) James Story (qualified)
12. (United States) Blaise Bicknell (qualifying competition)
13. (Japan) Ryoma Matsushita (qualified)
14. (South Africa) Khololwam Montsi (qualified)
15. (South Africa) Charl Morgan (qualifying competition)
16. (South Africa) Joubert Klopper (qualified)

=== Qualifiers ===
1. (Japan) Ryoma Matsushita
2. (United Kingdom) James Story
3. (South Africa) Khololwam Montsi
4. (France) Lilian Marmousez
5. (South Africa) Joubert Klopper
6. (Japan) Ryuhei Azuma
7. (United Kingdom) Connor Thomson
8. (Italy) Luciano Darderi

=== Draw ===
==== First qualifier ====
First round
1	(Romania) Cezar Crețu	6	6
WC	(Australia) Shuannon Tricerri	1	2
WC	(Hong Kong) Chak Lam Coleman Wong	1	4
13	(Japan) Ryoma Matsushita	6	6

Qualifying competition
1	(Romania) Cezar Crețu	2	6^{4}
13	(Japan) Ryoma Matsushita	6	7^{7}

==== Second qualifier ====
First round
2	(Russia) Egor Agafonov	6	6
(Turkey) Emir Şendoğan	1	3
WC	(Australia) Alex Bulte	7	4	4
11	(United Kingdom) James Story	5	6	6

Qualifying competition
2	(Russia) Egor Agafonov	4	7^{7}	4
11	(United Kingdom) James Story	6	6^{4}	6

==== Third qualifier ====
First round
3	(Romania) Nini Gabriel Dica	6	3	6
WC	(Australia) Nikita Volonski	4	6	1
(Poland) Piotr Pawlak	4	5
14	(South Africa) Khololwam Montsi	6	7

Qualifying competition
3	(Romania) Nini Gabriel Dica	6	4	4
14	(South Africa) Khololwam Montsi	4	6	6

==== Fourth qualifier ====
First round
4	(France) Lilian Marmousez	6	7^{7}
(Japan) Taiyo Yamanaka	0	6^{3}
(United States) Adam Neff	6^{0}	3
15	(South Africa) Charl Morgan	7^{7}	6

Qualifying competition
4	(France) Lilian Marmousez	6	6
15	(South Africa) Charl Morgan	2	4

==== Fifth qualifier ====
First round
5	(Chinese Taipei) Tsai Chang-lin	5	6	6
WC	(Australia) Edward Vo	7	2	4
(Turkey) Berk İlkel	2	3
16	(South Africa) Joubert Klopper	6	6

Qualifying competition
5	(Chinese Taipei) Tsai Chang-lin	4	3
16	(South Africa) Joubert Klopper	6	6

==== Sixth qualifier ====
First round
6	(Italy) Fabrizio Andaloro	6	6
(Australia) Cihan Akay	4	3
(Japan) Ryuhei Azuma	6	6
9	(Brazil) João Ferreira	4	3

Qualifying competition
6	(Italy) Fabrizio Andaloro	3	6	4
(Japan) Ryuhei Azuma	6	1	6

==== Seventh qualifier ====
First round
7	(Italy) Filippo Moroni	6^{4}	6^{4}
(United Kingdom) Connor Thomson	7^{7}	7^{7}
(Spain) Javier Cueto Ramos	6	7
10	(Japan) Tomoya Ikeda	3	5

Qualifying competition
(United Kingdom) Connor Thomson	7^{7}	6
(Spain) Javier Cueto Ramos	6^{4}	3

==== Eighth qualifier ====
First round
8	(Italy) Luciano Darderi	6	6
(Japan) Fumiya Yoshino	1	1
WC	(Australia) Kamil Kozlowski	2	5
12	(United States) Blaise Bicknell	6	7

Qualifying competition
8	(Italy) Luciano Darderi	6	6
12	(United States) Blaise Bicknell	4	4
