= 2019 Australian Open – Boys' doubles =

Boys' doubles
- 2019 Australian Open

Final
- Champions: (Czech Republic) Jonáš Forejtek (Czech Republic) Dalibor Svrčina
- Runners-up: (United States) Cannon Kingsley (United States) Emilio Nava
- Score: 7–6^{(7–5)}, 6–4

Events
Singles	men	women		boys	girls
Doubles	men	women	mixed	boys	girls
WC Singles	men	women	quad
WC Doubles	men	women	quad
Legends	men	women	mixed
- Australian Open

Jonáš Forejtek and Dalibor Svrčina won the boys' doubles tennis title at the 2019 Australian Open, defeating Cannon Kingsley and Emilio Nava in the final, 7–6^{(7–5)}, 6–4.

Hugo Gaston and Clément Tabur were the defending champions, but both players were no longer eligible to participate in junior tournaments.

== Seeds ==
1. (Australia) Rinky Hijikata / (Finland) Otto Virtanen (second round)
2. (Spain) Nicolás Álvarez Varona / (Romania) Filip Cristian Jianu (semifinals)
3. (Czech Republic) Jonáš Forejtek / (Czech Republic) Dalibor Svrčina (champions)
4. (United States) Cannon Kingsley / (United States) Emilio Nava (final)
5. (Italy) Lorenzo Musetti / (Italy) Giulio Zeppieri (semifinals)
6. (France) Valentin Royer / (Denmark) Holger Vitus Nødskov Rune (second round)
7. (United States) Tristan Boyer / (United States) Tyler Zink (second round)
8. (Canada) Liam Draxl / (United States) Zane Khan (quarterfinals)

== Draw ==
Key

- Q = Qualifier
- WC = Wild card
- LL = Lucky loser
- Alt = Alternate
- ITF = ITF entry
- PR = Protected ranking
- SR = Special ranking
- SE = Special exempt
- JE = Junior exempt
- JR = Junior Accelerator Programme entrant
- CO = College Accelerator Programme entrant
- NG = Next Gen Accelerator Program entrant
- w/o = Walkover
- r = Retired
- d = Defaulted

=== Finals ===
Semifinals
5	(Italy) Lorenzo Musetti (Italy) Giulio Zeppieri	4	6^{2}
3	(Czech Republic) Jonáš Forejtek (Czech Republic) Dalibor Svrčina	6	7^{7}
4	(United States) Cannon Kingsley (United States) Emilio Nava	6	6
2	(Spain) Nicolás Álvarez Varona (Romania) Filip Cristian Jianu	3	4

Final
3	(Czech Republic) Jonáš Forejtek (Czech Republic) Dalibor Svrčina	7^{7}	6
4	(United States) Cannon Kingsley (United States) Emilio Nava	6^{5}	4

=== Top half ===
First round
1	(Australia) Rinky Hijikata (Finland) Otto Virtanen	6	6^{6}	[10]
(Australia) Stefan Storch (China) Bu Yunchaokete	4	7^{8}	[8]
(Japan) Ryuhei Azuma (Japan) Ryoma Matsushita	2	6^{4}
(South Korea) Han Seon-yong (Thailand) Thantub Suksumrarn	6	7^{7}
WC	(Australia) Chen Dong (Australia) Tai Sach	7^{7}	6
(Hong Kong) Ng Ki-lung (Turkey) Bora Şengül	6^{1}	3
(Czech Republic) Jiří Lehečka (Poland) Wojciech Marek	7^{7}	5	[5]
5	(Italy) Lorenzo Musetti (Italy) Giulio Zeppieri	6^{5}	7	[10]
3	(Czech Republic) Jonáš Forejtek (Czech Republic) Dalibor Svrčina	7^{7}	6
(United States) Toby Alex Kodat (Sweden) Gustaf Ström	6^{3}	2
(South Africa) Joubert Klopper (South Africa) Khololwam Montsi	1	6	[10]
(United Kingdom) James Story (United Kingdom) Harry Wendelken	6	4	[6]
(Croatia) Admir Kalender (France) Harold Mayot	6	6
WC	(Australia) Shuannon Tricerri (Australia) Edward Vo	3	2
(Switzerland) Dominic Stricker (Ukraine) Eric Vanshelboim	4	3
7	(United States) Tristan Boyer (United States) Tyler Zink	6	6

Second round
1	(Australia) R Hijikata (Finland) O Virtanen	6	6^{5}	[3]
(South Korea) S-y Han (Thailand) T Suksumrarn	1	7^{7}	[10]
WC	(Australia) C Dong (Australia) T Sach	6^{5}	2
5	(Italy) L Musetti (Italy) G Zeppieri	7^{7}	6
3	(Czech Republic) J Forejtek (Czech Republic) D Svrčina	5	6	[10]
(South Africa) J Klopper (South Africa) K Montsi	7	4	[7]
(Croatia) A Kalender (France) H Mayot	6	5	[10]
7	(United States) T Boyer (United States) T Zink	4	7	[5]

Quarterfinals
(South Korea) S-y Han (Thailand) T Suksumrarn	6^{6}	3
5	(Italy) L Musetti (Italy) G Zeppieri	7^{8}	6
3	(Czech Republic) J Forejtek (Czech Republic) D Svrčina	6	6
(Croatia) A Kalender (France) H Mayot	4	4

Semifinals
5	(Italy) L Musetti (Italy) G Zeppieri	4	6^{2}
3	(Czech Republic) J Forejtek (Czech Republic) D Svrčina	6	7^{7}

=== Bottom half ===
First round
8	(Canada) Liam Draxl (United States) Zane Khan	6	6
WC	(Australia) Ken Cavrak (Australia) Tom Evans	2	4
(Romania) Nicholas David Ionel (Vietnam) Nguyễn Văn Phương	7	5	[10]
(Russia) Alexandr Binda (Netherlands) Lodewijk Weststrate	5	7	[7]
(France) Lilian Marmousez (United States) Eliot Spizzirri	6	6
(Italy) Luicano Darderi (Netherlands) Christian Lerby	4	3
WC	(Australia) Kamil Kozlowski (Australia) Nikita Volonski	6	0	[7]
4	(United States) Cannon Kingsley (United States) Emilio Nava	4	6	[10]
6	(France) Valentin Royer (Denmark) Holger Vitus Nødskov Rune	7^{7}	1	[10]
(Brazil) Mateus Alves (Brazil) Natan Rodrigues	6^{1}	6	[6]
(Australia) Tristan Schoolkate (Australia) Dane Sweeny	7	6
(Belgium) Louis Herman (Belgium) Gauthier Onclin	5	4
(Italy) Matteo Arnaldi (Italy) Francesco Passaro	6^{4}	6^{1}
(United Kingdom) Jacob Fearnley (United Kingdom) Connor Thomson	7^{7}	7^{7}
(Japan) Shunsuke Mitsui (Japan) Keisuke Saitoh	7^{7}	5	[10]
2	(Spain) Nicolás Álvarez Varona (Romania) Filip Cristian Jianu	6^{2}	7	[12]

Second round
8	(Canada) L Draxl (United States) Z Khan	7	6
(Romania) ND Ionel (Vietnam) PV Nguyễn	5	2
(France) L Marmousez (United States) E Spizzirri	3	3
4	(United States) C Kingsley (United States) E Nava	6	6
6	(France) V Royer (Denmark) HVN Rune	6^{2}	3
(Australia) T Schoolkate (Australia) D Sweeny	7^{7}	6
(United Kingdom) J Fearnley (United Kingdom) C Thomson	3	7^{7}	[8]
2	(Spain) N Álvarez Varona (Romania) FC Jianu	6	6^{4}	[10]

Quarterfinals
8	(Canada) L Draxl (United States) Z Khan	5	1
4	(United States) C Kingsley (United States) E Nava	7	6
(Australia) T Schoolkate (Australia) D Sweeny	4	4
2	(Spain) N Álvarez Varona (Romania) FC Jianu	6	6

Semifinals
4	(United States) C Kingsley (United States) E Nava	6	6
2	(Spain) N Álvarez Varona (Romania) FC Jianu	3	4
