= Giulia Morlet =

French tennis player (born 2002)

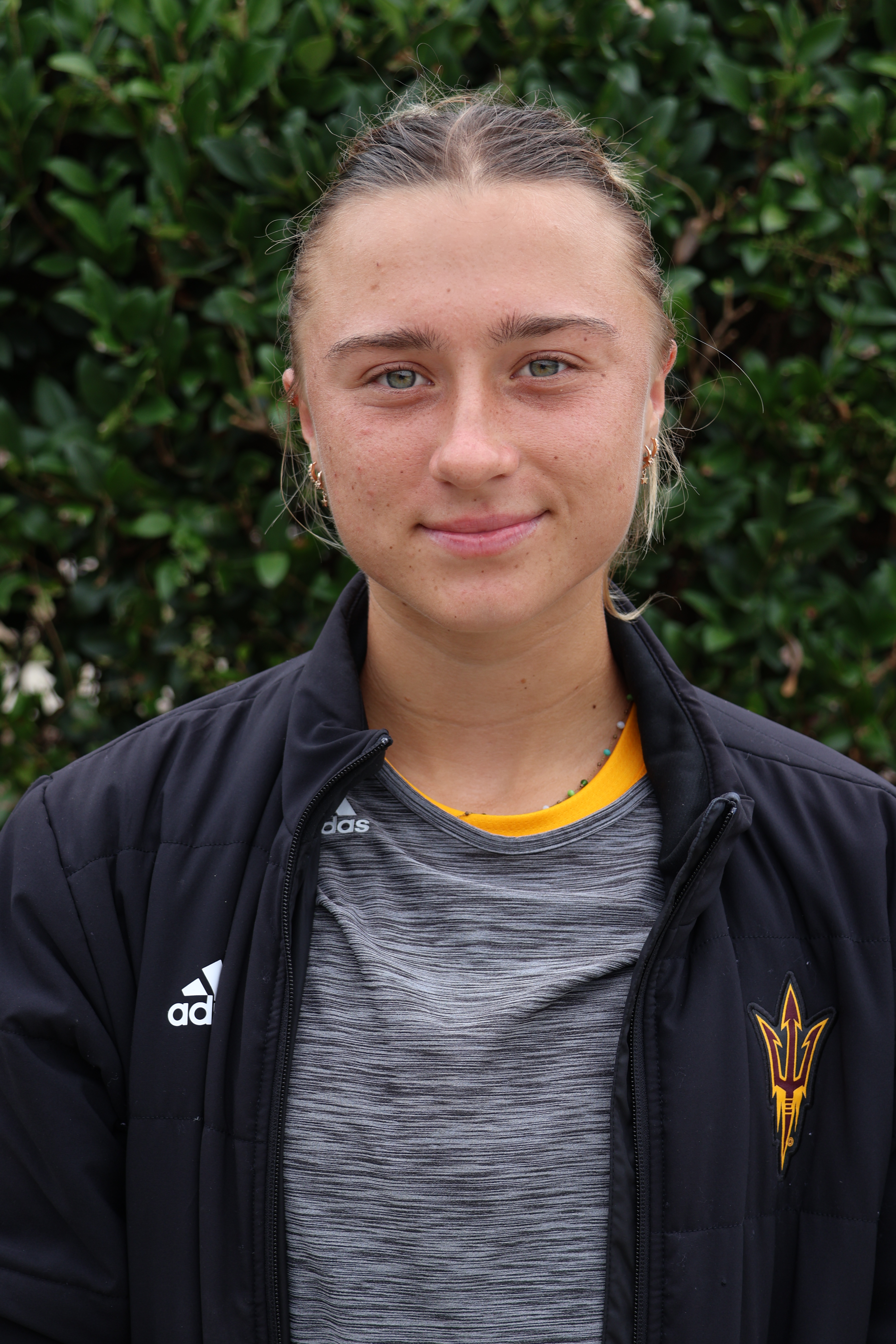
- Morlet in 2023
- Country (sports): France
- Born: 14 January 2002 (age 23)
- Plays: Left-handed (two-handed backhand)
- Prize money: $11,369

Singles
- Career record: 23–23
- Career titles: 0
- Highest ranking: No. 1055 (18 October 2021)

Grand Slam singles results
- Australian Open Junior: 1R (2019, 2020)
- French Open Junior: 1R (2020)

Doubles
- Career record: 4–7
- Career titles: 0
- Highest ranking: No. 1098 (18 October 2021)

Grand Slam doubles results
- French Open: 1R (2017)
- Last updated on: 18 July 2024.

Giulia Morlet (born 14 January 2002) is a French tennis player.

Morlet has a career high WTA singles ranking of 1055 achieved on 18 October 2021.

Morlet made her WTA main draw debut at the 2017 French Open in the doubles draw partnering Diane Parry. They were defeated by Kiki Bertens and Johanna Larsson in the first round.

Morlet played college tennis at Arizona State University.
