= 2019 Australian Open – Wheelchair women's doubles =

Wheelchair women's doubles
- 2019 Australian Open

Final
- Champion: (Netherlands) Diede de Groot (Netherlands) Aniek van Koot
- Runner-up: (Netherlands) Marjolein Buis (Germany) Sabine Ellerbrock
- Score: 5–7, 7–6^{(7–4)}, [10–8]

Events
Singles	men	women		boys	girls
Doubles	men	women	mixed	boys	girls
WC Singles	men	women	quad
WC Doubles	men	women	quad
Legends	men	women	mixed
← 2018 ·	Australian Open	· 2020 →

Diede de Groot and Aniek van Koot defeated the defending champion Marjolein Buis and her partner Sabine Ellerbrock in the final, 5–7, 7–6^{(7–4)}, [10–8] to win the women's doubles wheelchair tennis title at the 2019 Australian Open. It was their first step towards an eventual Grand Slam, and de Groot completed the career Grand Slam with the win.

Buis and Yui Kamiji were the defending champions, but did not participate together. Kamiji partnered Giulia Capocci, but was defeated in the semifinals by de Groot and van Koot.

== Seeds ==
1. (Netherlands) Diede de Groot / (Netherlands) Aniek van Koot (champions)
2. (Netherlands) Marjolein Buis / (Germany) Sabine Ellerbrock (final)

== Draw ==
=== Key ===
- Q = Qualifier
- WC = Wild card
- LL = Lucky loser
- Alt = Alternate
- ITF = ITF entry
- PR = Protected ranking
- SR = Special ranking
- SE = Special exempt
- JE = Junior exempt
- JR = Junior Accelerator Programme entrant
- CO = College Accelerator Programme entrant
- NG = Next Gen Accelerator Program entrant
- w/o = Walkover
- r = Retired
- d = Defaulted

=== Draw ===
First round
1	(Netherlands) Diede de Groot (Netherlands) Aniek van Koot	6	6
(Italy) Giulia Capocci (Japan) Yui Kamiji	2	0
(South Africa) Kgothatso Montjane (United Kingdom) Lucy Shuker	6	1	[7]
2	(Netherlands) Marjolein Buis (Germany) Sabine Ellerbrock	2	6	[10]

Final
1	(Netherlands) Diede de Groot (Netherlands) Aniek van Koot	5	7^{7}	[10]
2	(Netherlands) Marjolein Buis (Germany) Sabine Ellerbrock	7	6^{4}	[8]
