= 2019 Australian Open – Wheelchair men's singles =

Wheelchair men's singles
- 2019 Australian Open

Final
- Champion: (Argentina) Gustavo Fernández
- Runner-up: (Sweden) Stefan Olsson
- Score: 7–5, 6–3

Events
Singles	men	women		boys	girls
Doubles	men	women	mixed	boys	girls
WC Singles	men	women	quad
WC Doubles	men	women	quad
Legends	men	women	mixed
- Australian Open

Gustavo Fernández defeated Stefan Olsson in the final, 7–5, 6–3 to win the men's singles wheelchair tennis title at the 2019 Australian Open. It was his second Australian Open singles title and third major singles title overall.

Shingo Kunieda was the defending champion, but was defeated by Olsson in the semifinals.

== Seeds ==
1. (Japan) Shingo Kunieda (semifinals)
2. (Argentina) Gustavo Fernández (champion)

== Draw ==
Key

- Q = Qualifier
- WC = Wild card
- LL = Lucky loser
- Alt = Alternate
- ITF = ITF entry
- PR = Protected ranking
- SR = Special ranking
- SE = Special exempt
- JE = Junior exempt
- JR = Junior Accelerator Programme entrant
- CO = College Accelerator Programme entrant
- NG = Next Gen Accelerator Program entrant
- w/o = Walkover
- r = Retired
- d = Defaulted

=== Draw ===
First round
1	(Japan) Shingo Kunieda	6	6
(United Kingdom) Alfie Hewett	1	4
(Belgium) Joachim Gérard	4	3
(Sweden) Stefan Olsson	6	6
(United Kingdom) Gordon Reid	6^{8}	7	2
(France) Stéphane Houdet	7^{10}	5	6
WC	(Australia) Ben Weekes	1	1
2	(Argentina) Gustavo Fernández	6	6

Semifinals
1	(Japan) Shingo Kunieda	4	6	3
(Sweden) Stefan Olsson	6	3	6
(France) Stéphane Houdet	4	7	1
2	(Argentina) Gustavo Fernández	6	5	6

Final
(Sweden) Stefan Olsson	5	3
2	(Argentina) Gustavo Fernández	7	6
