= 2019 Australian Open – Mixed doubles =

Mixed doubles
- 2019 Australian Open

Final
- Champions: (Czech Republic) Barbora Krejčíková (United States) Rajeev Ram
- Runners-up: (Australia) Astra Sharma (Australia) John-Patrick Smith
- Score: 7–6^{(7–3)}, 6–1

Details
- Draw: 32
- Seeds: 8

Events
Singles	men	women		boys	girls
Doubles	men	women	mixed	boys	girls
WC Singles	men	women	quad
WC Doubles	men	women	quad
Legends	men	women	mixed
- Australian Open

Barbora Krejčíková and Rajeev Ram defeated Astra Sharma and John-Patrick Smith in the final, 7–6^{(7–3)}, 6–1 to win the mixed doubles tennis title at the 2019 Australian Open.

Gabriela Dabrowski and Mate Pavić were the defending champions, but were defeated in the quarterfinals by María José Martínez Sánchez and Neal Skupski.

== Seeds ==
1. (Canada) Gabriela Dabrowski / (Croatia) Mate Pavić (quarterfinals)
2. (United States) Nicole Melichar / (Brazil) Bruno Soares (semifinals)
3. (Czech Republic) Barbora Krejčíková / (United States) Rajeev Ram (champions)
4. (Romania) Mihaela Buzărnescu / (Austria) Oliver Marach (first round, retired)
5. (Germany) Anna-Lena Grönefeld / (Colombia) Robert Farah (quarterfinals)
6. (United States) Abigail Spears / (Colombia) Juan Sebastián Cabal (quarterfinals)
7. (Japan) Makoto Ninomiya / (Japan) Ben McLachlan (first round)
8. (Russia) Ekaterina Makarova / (New Zealand) Artem Sitak (first round)

== Draw ==
Key

- Q = Qualifier
- WC = Wild card
- LL = Lucky loser
- Alt = Alternate
- ITF = ITF entry
- PR = Protected ranking
- SR = Special ranking
- SE = Special exempt
- JE = Junior exempt
- JR = Junior Accelerator Programme entrant
- CO = College Accelerator Programme entrant
- NG = Next Gen Accelerator Program entrant
- w/o = Walkover
- r = Retired
- d = Defaulted

=== Finals ===
Semifinals
(Spain) María José Martínez Sánchez (United Kingdom) Neal Skupski	0	4
3	(Czech Republic) Barbora Krejčíková (United States) Rajeev Ram	6	6
WC	(Australia) Astra Sharma (Australia) John-Patrick Smith	6	7^{7}
2	(United States) Nicole Melichar (Brazil) Bruno Soares	4	6^{5}

Final
3	(Czech Republic) Barbora Krejčíková (United States) Rajeev Ram	7^{7}	6
WC	(Australia) Astra Sharma (Australia) John-Patrick Smith	6^{3}	1

=== Top half ===
First round
1	(Canada) G Dabrowski (Croatia) M Pavić	6	6
WC	(Australia) P Hon (Australia) A Popyrin	3	3
(United States) D Collins (New Zealand) M Venus	4	4
(Chinese Taipei) H-c Chan (Netherlands) J-J Rojer	6	6
(Slovenia) K Srebotnik (Croatia) F Škugor	3	3
(Spain) MJ Martínez Sánchez (United Kingdom) N Skupski	6	6
WC	(Australia) J Moore (Australia) A Whittington	6	3	[10]
7	(Japan) M Ninomiya (Japan) B McLachlan	2	6	[5]
3	(Czech Republic) B Krejčíková (United States) R Ram	1	6	[10]
(Switzerland) T Bacsinszky (France) N Mahut	6	2	[6]
(Poland) A Rosolska (Croatia) N Mektić	1	6	[5]
WC	(Poland) I Świątek (Poland) Ł Kubot	6	2	[10]
WC	(Australia) S Stosur (India) L Paes	6	7
(Czech Republic) K Peschke (Netherlands) W Koolhof	4	5
(China) Z Yang (India) R Bopanna	6	3	[6]
5	(Germany) A-L Grönefeld (Colombia) R Farah	3	6	[10]

Second round
1	(Canada) G Dabrowski (Croatia) M Pavić	6	6
(Chinese Taipei) H-c Chan (Netherlands) J-J Rojer	4	3
(Spain) MJ Martínez Sánchez (United Kingdom) N Skupski	6	6
WC	(Australia) J Moore (Australia) A Whittington	4	1
3	(Czech Republic) B Krejčíková (United States) R Ram	6	4	[10]
WC	(Poland) I Świątek (Poland) Ł Kubot	3	6	[5]
WC	(Australia) S Stosur (India) L Paes	6	4	[8]
5	(Germany) A-L Grönefeld (Colombia) R Farah	4	6	[10]

Quarterfinals
1	(Canada) G Dabrowski (Croatia) M Pavić	1	6	[9]
(Spain) MJ Martínez Sánchez (United Kingdom) N Skupski	6	4	[11]
3	(Czech Republic) B Krejčíková (United States) R Ram	6	7
5	(Germany) A-L Grönefeld (Colombia) R Farah	2	5

Semifinals
(Spain) MJ Martínez Sánchez (United Kingdom) N Skupski	0	4
3	(Czech Republic) B Krejčíková (United States) R Ram	6	6

=== Bottom half ===
First round
8	(Russia) E Makarova (New Zealand) A Sitak	3	4
(Slovenia) A Klepač (France) É Roger-Vasselin	6	6
WC	(Australia) A Sharma (Australia) J-P Smith	6	6
WC	(Australia) M Inglis (Australia) J Kubler	1	2
(France) K Mladenovic (Sweden) R Lindstedt	6	6
(Sweden) J Larsson (United Kingdom) D Inglot	2	2
(United States) B Mattek-Sands (United Kingdom) J Murray	4
4	(Romania) M Buzărnescu (Austria) O Marach	1^{r}
6	(United States) A Spears (Colombia) JS Cabal	7	6
(Chinese Taipei) L Chan (Croatia) I Dodig	5	2
(Netherlands) D Schuurs (Netherlands) M Middelkoop	6	7^{7}
WC	(Australia) M Adamczak (Australia) M Reid	4	6^{1}
WC	(China) S Zhang (Australia) J Peers	3	6	[7]
(Hungary) T Babos (Hungary) M Fucsovics	6	4	[10]
(Romania) I-C Begu (Romania) H Tecău	1	3
2	(United States) N Melichar (Brazil) B Soares	6	6

Second round
(Slovenia) A Klepač (France) É Roger-Vasselin	4	5
WC	(Australia) A Sharma (Australia) J-P Smith	6	7
(France) K Mladenovic (Sweden) R Lindstedt	4	4
(United States) B Mattek-Sands (United Kingdom) J Murray	6	6
6	(United States) A Spears (Colombia) JS Cabal	6	6
(Netherlands) D Schuurs (Netherlands) M Middelkoop	1	2
(Hungary) T Babos (Hungary) M Fucsovics	3	2
2	(United States) N Melichar (Brazil) B Soares	6	6

Quarterfinals
WC	(Australia) A Sharma (Australia) J-P Smith	6	7^{7}
(United States) B Mattek-Sands (United Kingdom) J Murray	2	6^{5}
6	(United States) A Spears (Colombia) JS Cabal	1	6^{3}
2	(United States) N Melichar (Brazil) B Soares	6	7^{7}

Semifinals
WC	(Australia) A Sharma (Australia) J-P Smith	6	7^{7}
2	(United States) N Melichar (Brazil) B Soares	4	6^{5}
