= 2019 Australian Open – Wheelchair quad doubles =

Wheelchair quad doubles
- 2019 Australian Open

Final
- Champions: (Australia) Dylan Alcott (Australia) Heath Davidson
- Runners-up: (United Kingdom) Andy Lapthorne (United States) David Wagner
- Score: 6–3, 6–7^{(6–8)}, [12–10]

Events
Singles	men	women		boys	girls
Doubles	men	women	mixed	boys	girls
WC Singles	men	women	quad
WC Doubles	men	women	quad
Legends	men	women	mixed
- Australian Open

Defending champions Dylan Alcott and Heath Davidson defeated Andy Lapthorne and David Wagner in the final, 6–3, 6–7^{(6–8)}, [12–10] to win the quad doubles wheelchair tennis title at the 2019 Australian Open. It was the first step towards an eventual Grand Slam for Alcott.

== Seeds ==
1. (United Kingdom) Andy Lapthorne / (United States) David Wagner (final)
2. (Australia) Dylan Alcott / (Australia) Heath Davidson (champions)

== Draw ==
Key

- Q = Qualifier
- WC = Wild card
- LL = Lucky loser
- Alt = Alternate
- ITF = ITF entry
- PR = Protected ranking
- SR = Special ranking
- SE = Special exempt
- JE = Junior exempt
- JR = Junior Accelerator Programme entrant
- CO = College Accelerator Programme entrant
- NG = Next Gen Accelerator Program entrant
- w/o = Walkover
- r = Retired
- d = Defaulted

Final
1	(United Kingdom) Andy Lapthorne (United States) David Wagner	3	7^{8}	[10]
2	(Australia) Dylan Alcott (Australia) Heath Davidson	6	6^{6}	[12]
