= 2019 Australian Open – Men's legends' doubles =

Men's legends' doubles
- 2019 Australian Open

Final
- Champions: (France) Mansour Bahrami (Australia) Mark Philippoussis
- Runners-up: (Sweden) Jonas Björkman (Sweden) Thomas Johansson
- Score: 4–3^{(5–3)}, 4–2

Events
Singles	men	women		boys	girls
Doubles	men	women	mixed	boys	girls
WC Singles	men	women	quad
WC Doubles	men	women	quad
Legends	men	women	mixed
← 2018 ·	Australian Open	· 2020 →

Mansour Bahrami and Mark Philippoussis won the title, defeating Jonas Björkman and Thomas Johansson in the final, 4–3^{(5–3)}, 4–2. The Men's Legends' Doubles was competed in the 2019 Australian Open in Melbourne Park. "Doubles tennis can be enjoyed by players of all levels and of all ages", from children beginning tennis lessons through to the level of the Australian Open.

== Draw ==
=== Key ===
- Q = Qualifier
- WC = Wild card
- LL = Lucky loser
- Alt = Alternate
- ITF = ITF entry
- PR = Protected ranking
- SR = Special ranking
- SE = Special exempt
- JE = Junior exempt
- JR = Junior Accelerator Programme entrant
- CO = College Accelerator Programme entrant
- NG = Next Gen Accelerator Program entrant
- w/o = Walkover
- r = Retired
- d = Defaulted

=== Final ===
Final
A3	(Sweden) Jonas Björkman (Sweden) Thomas Johansson	3^{3}	2
B4	(France) Mansour Bahrami (Australia) Mark Philippoussis	4^{5}	4

=== Laver group ===
		(United States) McEnroe (United States) McEnroe	(France) Leconte (Australia) Woodbridge	(Sweden) Björkman (Sweden) Johansson	(United States) Chang (Netherlands) Eltingh	RR; W–L	Set; W–L	Game; W–L	Standings
A1	(United States) John McEnroe (United States) Patrick McEnroe		4–1, 4–3^{(5–2)}	3−4^{(4−5)}, 4−3^{(5−4)}, 4−2	4–3^{(5–1)}, 4–2	3−0	6−1	27−18	1
A2	(France) Henri Leconte (Australia) Todd Woodbridge	1–4, 3–4^{(2–5)}		4–3^{(5–3)}, 2–4, 2–4	4–2, 2–4, 4–1	1–2	3–5	22–26	3
A3	(Sweden) Jonas Björkman (Sweden) Thomas Johansson	4−3^{(5−4)}, 3−4^{(4−5)}, 2−4	3–4^{(3–5)}, 4–2, 4–2		4−2, 4−3^{(5−4)}	2−1	5−3	28−24	2
A4	(United States) Michael Chang (Netherlands) Jacco Eltingh	3–4^{(1–5)}, 2–4	2–4, 4–2, 1–4	2−4, 3−4^{(4−5)}		0–3	1–6	17–26	4

=== Rosewall group ===
		(Sweden) Enqvist (Sweden) Wilander	(South Africa) Ferreira (Croatia) Ivanišević	(Australia) Cash (Australia) Woodforde	(France) Bahrami (Australia) Philippoussis	RR; W–L	Set; W–L	Game; W–L	Standings
B1	(Sweden) Thomas Enqvist (Sweden) Mats Wilander		4–3^{(5–4)}, 4–1	3–4^{(4–5)}, 4–1, 2–4	4−3^{(5−4)}, 1−4, 4−2	2−1	5−3	26−22	1
B2	(South Africa) Wayne Ferreira (Croatia) Goran Ivanišević	3–4^{(4–5)}, 1–4		1−4, 4−1, 4−2	1–4, 4–2, 3–4^{(1–5)}	1−2	3−5	21−25	3
B3	(Australia) Pat Cash (Australia) Mark Woodforde	4–3^{(5–4)}, 1–4, 4–2	4−1, 1−4, 2−4		1–4, 3–4^{(3–5)}	1−2	3−5	20−26	4
B4	(France) Mansour Bahrami (Australia) Mark Philippoussis	3−4^{(4−5)}, 4−1, 2−4	4–1, 2–4, 4–3^{(5–1)}	4–1, 4–3^{(5–3)}		2−1	5−3	27−21	2
