= 2019 Australian Open – Wheelchair quad singles =

Wheelchair quad singles
- 2019 Australian Open

Final
- Champion: (Australia) Dylan Alcott
- Runner-up: (United States) David Wagner
- Score: 6–4, 7–6^{(7–2)}

Events
| Singles | men | women | | boys | girls |
| Doubles | men | women | mixed | boys | girls |
| WC Singles | men | women | quad |
| WC Doubles | men | women | quad |
| Legends | men | women | mixed |
- Australian Open

Four-time defending champion Dylan Alcott defeated David Wagner in the final, 6–4, 7–6^{(7–2)} to win the quad singles wheelchair tennis title at the 2019 Australian Open.

== Seeds ==
1. (Australia) Dylan Alcott (champion)
2. (United States) David Wagner (final)

== Draw ==
Key

- Q = Qualifier
- WC = Wild card
- LL = Lucky loser
- Alt = Alternate
- ITF = ITF entry
- PR = Protected ranking
- SR = Special ranking
- SE = Special exempt
- JE = Junior exempt
- JR = Junior Accelerator Programme entrant
- CO = College Accelerator Programme entrant
- NG = Next Gen Accelerator Program entrant
- w/o = Walkover
- r = Retired
- d = Defaulted

=== Final ===
| Final |
| 1 | (Australia) Dylan Alcott | 6 | 7^{7} |
| 2 | (United States) David Wagner | 4 | 6^{2} |

=== Round robin ===
| | | (Australia) Alcott | (Australia) Davidson | (United Kingdom) Lapthorne | (United States) Wagner | RR; W–L | Set; W–L | Game; W–L | Standings |
| 1 | (Australia) Dylan Alcott | | 6–3, 6–2 | w/o | 6–7^{(3–7)}, 6–4, 7–5 | 3–0 | 6–1 | 43–21 | 1 |
| WC | (Australia) Heath Davidson | 3–6, 2–6 | | 6–1, 6–1 | 7–6^{(8–6)}, 5–7, 3–6 | 1–2 | 3–4 | 32–33 | 3 |
| | (United Kingdom) Andy Lapthorne | w/o | 1–6, 1–6 | | 1–6, 6–4, 4–6 | 0–3 | 1–6 | 13–40 | 4 |
| 2 | (United States) David Wagner | 7–6^{(7–3)}, 4–6, 5–7 | 6–7^{(6–8)}, 7–5, 6–3 | 6–1, 4–6, 6–4 | | 2–1 | 5–4 | 51–45 | 2 |
