= 2019 in tennis =

This page covers all the important events in the sport of tennis in 2019. Primarily, it provides the results of notable tournaments throughout the year on both the ATP and WTA Tours, the Davis Cup, and the Fed Cup.

== ITF ==
=== Grand Slam events ===
Category	Championship	Champions	Finalists	Score in the final
Men's singles	Australian Open	(Serbia) Novak Djokovic	(Spain) Rafael Nadal	6–3, 6–2, 6–3
Men's singles	French Open	(Spain) Rafael Nadal	(Austria) Dominic Thiem	6–3, 5–7, 6–1, 6–1
Men's singles	Wimbledon	(Serbia) Novak Djokovic	(Switzerland) Roger Federer	7–6^{(7–5)}, 1–6, 7–6^{(7–4)}, 4–6, 13–12^{(7–3)}
Men's singles	US Open	(Spain) Rafael Nadal	(Russia) Daniil Medvedev	7–5, 6–3, 5–7, 4–6, 6–4

Category	Championship	Champions	Finalists	Score in the final
Women's singles	Australian Open	(Japan) Naomi Osaka	(Czech Republic) Petra Kvitová	7–6^{(7–2)}, 5–7, 6–4
Women's singles	French Open	(Australia) Ashleigh Barty	(Czech Republic) Markéta Vondroušová	6−1, 6−3
Women's singles	Wimbledon	(Romania) Simona Halep	(United States) Serena Williams	6–2, 6–2
Women's singles	US Open	(Canada) Bianca Andreescu	(United States) Serena Williams	6–3, 7–5

Category	Championship	Champions	Finalists	Score in the final
Men's Doubles	Australian Open	(France) Pierre-Hugues Herbert (France) Nicolas Mahut	(Finland) Henri Kontinen (Australia) John Peers	6–4, 7–6^{(7–1)}
Men's Doubles	French Open	(Germany) Kevin Krawietz (Germany) Andreas Mies	(France) Jérémy Chardy (France) Fabrice Martin	6–2, 7–6^{(7–3)}
Men's Doubles	Wimbledon	(Colombia) Juan Sebastián Cabal (Colombia) Robert Farah	(France) Nicolas Mahut (France) Édouard Roger-Vasselin	6–7^{(5–7)}, 7–6^{(7–5)}, 7–6^{(8–6)}, 6–7^{(5–7)}, 6–3
Men's Doubles	US Open	(Colombia) Juan Sebastián Cabal (Colombia) Robert Farah	(Spain) Marcel Granollers (Argentina) Horacio Zeballos	6–4, 7–5

Category	Championship	Champions	Finalists	Score in the final
Women's Doubles	Australian Open	(Australia) Samantha Stosur (China) Zhang Shuai	(Hungary) Tímea Babos (France) Kristina Mladenovic	6–3, 6–4
Women's Doubles	French Open	(Hungary) Tímea Babos (France) Kristina Mladenovic	(China) Duan Yingying (China) Zheng Saisai	6–2, 6–3
Women's Doubles	Wimbledon	(Chinese Taipei) Hsieh Su-wei (Czech Republic) Barbora Strýcová	(Canada) Gabriela Dabrowski (China) Xu Yifan	6–2, 6–4
Women's Doubles	US Open	(Belgium) Elise Mertens (Belarus) Aryna Sabalenka	(Belarus) Victoria Azarenka (Australia) Ashleigh Barty	7–5, 7–5

Category	Championship	Champions	Finalists	Score in the final
Mixed Doubles	Australian Open	(Czech Republic) Barbora Krejčíková (United States) Rajeev Ram	(Australia) Astra Sharma (Australia) John-Patrick Smith	7–6^{(7–3)}, 6–1
Mixed Doubles	French Open	(Chinese Taipei) Latisha Chan (Croatia) Ivan Dodig	(Canada) Gabriela Dabrowski (Croatia) Mate Pavić	6–1, 7–6^{(7–5)}
Mixed Doubles	Wimbledon	(Chinese Taipei) Latisha Chan (Croatia) Ivan Dodig	(Latvia) Jeļena Ostapenko (Sweden) Robert Lindstedt	6–2, 6–3
Mixed Doubles	US Open	(United States) Bethanie Mattek-Sands (United Kingdom) Jamie Murray	(Chinese Taipei) Chan Hao-ching (New Zealand) Michael Venus	6–2, 6–3

=== Knockout stage ===
Quarterfinals
22 November
8	Serbia	1
17	Russia	2
21 November
9	Australia	1
13	Canada	2
22 November
5	Great Britain	2
11	Germany	0
22 November
3	Argentina	1
7	Spain	2

Semifinals
23 November
17	Russia	1
13	Canada	2
23 November
5	Great Britain	1
7	Spain	2

Final
24 November
13	Canada	0
7	Spain	2

=== Fed Cup ===
Quarterfinals; 9–10 February
Ostrava, Czech Republic (hard, indoor)
1	Czech Republic	2
Romania	3
Liège, Belgium (hard, indoor)
4	France	3
Belgium	1
Braunschweig, Germany (hard, indoor)
Germany	0
3	Belarus	4
Asheville, United States (hard, indoor)
Australia	3
2	United States	2

Semifinals; 20–21 April
Rouen, France (clay, indoor)
Romania	2
4	France	3
Brisbane, Australia (hard)
3	Belarus	2
Australia	3

Final; 9–10 November
Perth, Australia (hard, indoor)
4	France	3
Australia	2

== IOC ==
- July 19 – August 4: Pan American Games
- December 1–7: Southeast Asian Games

== Other tennis events ==
- December 29, 2018 – January 5: 2019 Hopman Cup in (Australia) Perth
  - In the final, Switzerland (Roger Federer & Belinda Bencic) defeated Germany (Alexander Zverev & Angelique Kerber), 2–1.
- September 20–22: 2019 Laver Cup in (Switzerland) Geneva
  - Team Europe defeated Team World, 13–11, to win their third Laver Cup title.

== Non ATP or WTA tournaments ==
=== Exhibition ===
- December 27 – 29, 2018: 2018 Mubadala World Tennis Championship in (United Arab Emirates) Abu Dhabi
  - Men's Singles: (Serbia) Novak Djokovic defeated (South Africa) Kevin Anderson, 4–6, 7–5, 7–5.
  - Women's Singles: (United States) Venus Williams defeated (United States) Serena Williams, 4–6, 6–3, [10–8].

=== Multi-sport games ===
- May 27 – June 1: Games of the Small States of Europe in (Montenegro) Budva
- July 3 – 14: Summer Universiade in (Italy) Naples
- July 6 – 12: Island Games in Gibraltar
- July 8 – 20: Pacific Games in (Samoa) Apia
  - Men's singles: Colin Sinclair (Northern Mariana Islands)
  - Men's doubles: Matavo Fanguna / Semisi Fanguna (Tonga)
  - Men's team: Northern Mariana Islands
  - Women's singles: Abigail Tere-Apisah (Papua New Guinea)
  - Women's doubles: Abigail Tere-Apisah / Violet Apisah (Papua New Guinea)
  - Women's team: Papua New Guinea
- July 19 – 28: 2019 Indian Ocean Island Games in (Mauritius) Port Louis
- July 21 – 27: European Youth Summer Olympic Festival in (Azerbaijan) Baku
- July 26 – August 11: Pan American Games in (Peru) Lima
- August 16 – 31: African Games in (Morocco) Rabat
- November 30 – December 11: Southeast Asian Games in (Philippines) Clark, Subic, and Metro Manila
- December 1 – 13: 2019 South Asian Games in (Nepal) Kathmandu and Pokhara
