= Tennis at the 2019 European Youth Summer Olympic Festival – Boys' singles =

Boys singles at the 2019 European Youth Summer Olympic Festival
- Venue: Baku Tennis Academy
- Dates: 21–27 July
- Competitors: 60 from 33 nations

Medalists
gold medal	Daniel Mérida	Spain
silver medal	Vilius Gaubas	Lithuania
bronze medal	Niccolò Ciavarella	Italy

Boys' singles
- Tennis at the 2019 European Youth Summer Olympic Festival

Events
Singles	boys	girls
Doubles	boys	girls
← 2017 ·	European Youth Summer Olympic Festival	· 2021 →

The boys singles tennis event at the 2019 European Youth Summer Olympic Festival was held at the Baku Tennis Academy, Baku, Azerbaijan from 21 to 27 July 2019.

== Schedule ==
All times are Azerbaijan Time (UTC+04:00)

Date	Time	Event
Sunday, 21 July 2019	09:00	Round 1
Monday, 22 July 2019	09:00	Round 1
Tuesday, 23 July 2019	09:00	Round 2
Wednesday, 24 July 2019	09:00	Round 3
Thursday, 25 July 2019	09:00	Quarterfinals
Friday, 26 July 2019	09:00	Semifinals
Saturday, 27 July 2019	09:00	Finals

=== Finals ===
Semifinals
1	Daniel Mérida (ESP)	7^{7}
4	Niccolò Ciavarella (ITA)	6^{5}
3	Bartoň Hynek (CZE)	4
2	Vilius Gaubas (LTU)	6

Final
Daniel Mérida (ESP)	6
Vilius Gaubas (LTU)	2
Bronze medal match
Niccolò Ciavarella (ITA)	6
Bartoň Hynek (CZE)	1

=== Top half ===
==== Section 1 ====
Round 1
Matthias Ujvary (AUT)	3	6	10
Romain Galès (FRA)	6	4	5
Andrej Nedić (BIH)	6	6
Skerdi Hasa (ALB)	3	1
Togan Tokaç (TUR)	6	6
Noa Vukadin (CRO)	2	1
Theodoros Mitsakos (GRE)	5	1
Daniel Mérida (ESP)	7	6
Erko Nigula (EST)	3	6	10
Artur Yurkevich (BLR)	6	3	6
Oliver Olsson (GER)	6	6
Ruslans Filipenko (LAT)	1	1
Svetlin Keremedchiev (BUL)	1	2
Olaf Pieczkowski (POL)	6	6

Round 2
Matthew Donald (CZE)	6	6
Matthias Ujvary (AUT)	3	2
Andrej Nedić (BIH)	3	2
Togan Tokaç (TUR)	6	6
Daniel Mérida (ESP)	6	6
Erko Nigula (EST)	1	0
Oliver Olsson (GER)	6	5	10
Olaf Pieczkowski (POL)	3	7	4

Round 3
Matthew Donald (CZE)	6	6
Togan Tokaç (TUR)	2	3
Daniel Mérida (ESP)	6	6
Oliver Olsson (GER)	3	0

Quarterfinals
Matthew Donald (CZE)	6	4	8
Daniel Mérida (ESP)	3	6	10

==== Section 2 ====
Round of 64
Balázs Pesti (HUN)	3	0
Ron Ellouck (ISR)	6	6
Alessio Basile (BEL)	6	7
Kanan Gasimov (AZE)	4	5
Tiago Pereira (POR)	1	3
Niccolò Ciavarella (ITA)	6	6
Mika Brunold (SUI)	6	6
Fresk Sylhasi (KOS)	1	1
Andrei Voican (ROU)	6	6
Eldin Nokic (SWE)	1	3
Matthew Rankin (GBR)	6	2	10
Nikita Bochkarev (RUS)	2	6	12
Maj Premzl (SLO)	7	6
Edas Butvilas (LTU)	5	3

Round of 32
Peter Privara (SVK)	6	2	8
Ron Ellouck (ISR)	2	6	10
Alessio Basile (BEL)	4	0
Niccolò Ciavarella (ITA)	6	6
Mika Brunold (SUI)	3	6	5
Andrei Voican (ROU)	6	3	10
Nikita Bochkarev (RUS)	6	6
Maj Premzl (SLO)	3	1

Round of 16
Ron Ellouck (ISR)	0	1
Niccolò Ciavarella (ITA)	6	6
Andrei Voican (ROU)	6	6
Nikita Bochkarev (RUS)	3	1

Quarterfinals
Niccolò Ciavarella (ITA)	6	6
Andrei Voican (ROU)	4	1

=== Bottom half ===
==== Section 3 ====
Round 1
Dinko Dinev (BUL)	2	6^{4}
Till Brunner (SUI)	6	7^{7}
Georgios Valaris (GRE)	2	3
Daniel Milardovic (GER)	6	6
Pedro Ródenas (ESP)	6	6
Erden Er (TUR)	4	3
Yehonathan Bidny (ISR)	5	2
Bartoň Hynek (CZE)	7	6
Bor Artnak (SLO)	4	6^{1}
Noah Merre (BEL)	6	7^{7}
Yujiro Onuma (GBR)	6	7
Arthur O'Sullivan (IRL)	3	5
Daniel Ivanov (POR)	7	6
Noel Páll (HUN)	5	2

Round 2
Till Brunner (SUI)	6	4	10
Daniel Milardovic (GER)	3	6	7
Pedro Ródenas (ESP)	3	6	8
Bartoň Hynek (CZE)	6	4	10
Noah Merre (BEL)	6	6
Yujiro Onuma (GBR)	3	0
Daniel Ivanov (POR)	6	6
Filip Pieczonka (POL)	1	3

Round 3
Till Brunner (SUI)	1	0
Bartoň Hynek (CZE)	6	6
Noah Merre (BEL)	6	6
Daniel Ivanov (POR)	2	3

Quarterfinals
Bartoň Hynek (CZE)	6	6
Noah Merre (BEL)	2	4

==== Section 4 ====
Round 1
Peter Nad (SVK)	6	6
Alexi Khamrotau (BLR)	3	1
Tamerlan Azizov (AZE)	4	3
Daniele Minighini (ITA)	6	6
Alin Fătu (ROU)	6	6
Melos Nallbani (KOS)	0	2
Étienne Marty (FRA)	5	6	6
Grigory Shebekin (RUS)	7	1	10
Jan Kobierski (AUT)	6	6
Olle Noltorp (SWE)	3	4
Andreas Sillaste (EST)	7	6
Patrik Jurina (CRO)	5	2
Luka Jovanović (SRB)	4	6	8
Constantinos Koshis (CYP)	6	4	10

Round 2
Peter Nad (SVK)	3	4
Daniele Minighini (ITA)	6	6
Alin Fătu (ROU)	7	6
Grigory Shebekin (RUS)	5	4
Jan Kobierski (AUT)	2	2
Andreas Sillaste (EST)	6	6
Constantinos Koshis (CYP)	4	1
Vilius Gaubas (LTU)	6	6

Round 3
Daniele Minighini (ITA)	6	6
Alin Fătu (ROU)	1	4
Andreas Sillaste (EST)	4	3
Vilius Gaubas (LTU)	6	6

Quarterfinals
Daniele Minighini (ITA)	5	4
Vilius Gaubas (LTU)	7	6
