= Serbia at the 2019 European Youth Summer Olympic Festival =

in (Azerbaijan) Baku 21 July 2019 – 27 July 2019
- Competitors: 48 in 10 sports
- Medals Ranked 32nd: Gold 0 Silver 1 Bronze 3 Total 4

European Youth Summer Olympic Festival appearances
- 2007 • 2009 • 2011 • 2013 • 2015 • 2017 • 2019 • 2022 • 2023 • 2025

Serbia participated in the 2019 European Youth Summer Olympic Festival in Baku, Azerbaijan, from 21 to 27 July 2019. The Serbian delegation won a total of 4 medals: 1 silver and 3 bronze, and finished 32nd in the medal standings.

== Medalists ==
Medal	Athlete(s)	Sport	Event
Silver	Nina Stanisavljević	Swimming	Girls' 50 m freestyle
Bronze	Tomislav Isailović	Athletics	Boys' long jump
Bronze	Serbian men's basketball team	Basketball	Boys' basketball tournament
Bronze	Aleksandar Rajčić	Judo	Boys' –73 kg
