= 2019 Australian Open =

- Date: 14–27 January 2019
- Edition: 107th Open Era (51st)
- Category: Grand Slam
- Prize money: A$62,500,000
- Surface: Hard (Plexicushion)
- Location: Melbourne, Victoria, Australia
- Venue: Melbourne Park
- Attendance: 796,435

Champions

Men's singles
- (Serbia) Novak Djokovic

Women's singles
- (Japan) Naomi Osaka

Men's doubles
- (France) Pierre-Hugues Herbert / (France) Nicolas Mahut

Women's doubles
- (Australia) Samantha Stosur / (China) Zhang Shuai

Mixed doubles
- (Czech Republic) Barbora Krejčíková / (United States) Rajeev Ram

Wheelchair men's singles
- (Argentina) Gustavo Fernández

Wheelchair women's singles
- (Netherlands) Diede de Groot

Wheelchair quad singles
- (Australia) Dylan Alcott

Wheelchair men's doubles
- (Belgium) Joachim Gérard / (Sweden) Stefan Olsson

Wheelchair women's doubles
- (Netherlands) Diede de Groot / (Netherlands) Aniek van Koot

Wheelchair quad doubles
- (Australia) Dylan Alcott / (Australia) Heath Davidson

Boys' singles
- (Italy) Lorenzo Musetti

Girls' singles
- (Denmark) Clara Tauson

Boys' doubles
- (Czech Republic) Jonáš Forejtek / (Czech Republic) Dalibor Svrčina

Girls' doubles
- (Japan) Natsumi Kawaguchi / (Hungary) Adrienn Nagy

Men's legends doubles
- (France) Mansour Bahrami / (Australia) Mark Philippoussis
- Australian Open

The 2019 Australian Open was a Grand Slam tennis tournament that took place at Melbourne Park from 14 to 27 January 2019. It was the 107th edition of the Australian Open, the 51st in the Open Era, and the first Grand Slam of the year. The tournament consisted of events for professional players in singles, doubles and mixed doubles. Junior and wheelchair players competed in singles and doubles tournaments.

Roger Federer and Caroline Wozniacki were the defending men's and women's singles champions, but were unsuccessful in their respective title defenses; Federer lost to Stefanos Tsitsipas in the fourth round and Wozniacki lost to Maria Sharapova in the third round.

Novak Djokovic of Serbia won the men's singles title at the 2019 Australian Open, defeating Rafael Nadal of Spain in straight sets in the men's final. Naomi Osaka of Japan defeated Petra Kvitová of the Czech Republic in three sets to win the women's singles title. The tournament had a record attendance of 796,435 spectators. This is the most recent Grand Slam where no lucky losers were selected.

The 2019 Australian Open was the first edition to feature final set tie-breaks when a match reached 6–6 a match tiebreak to 10-points was played.

== Tournament ==
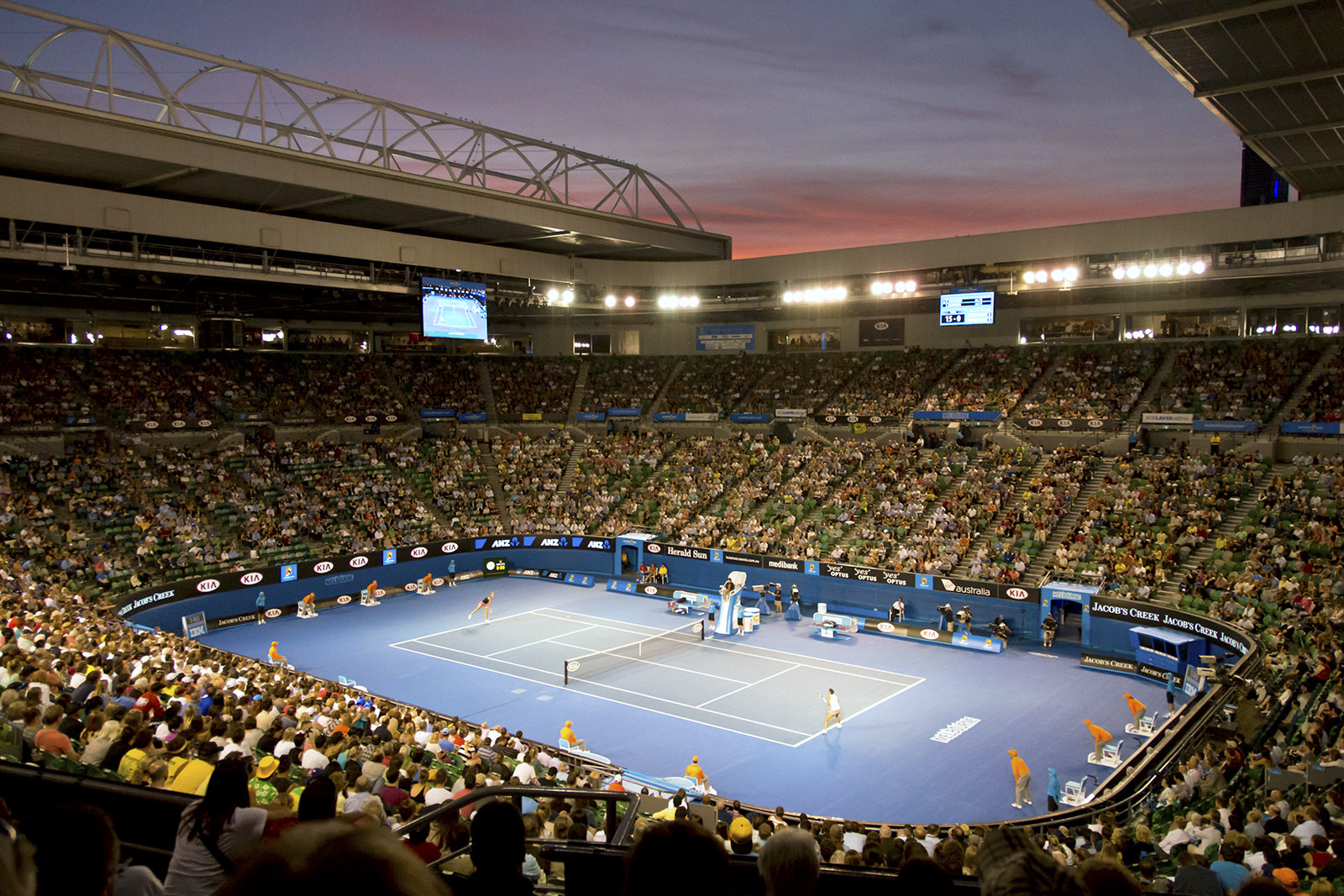
Rod Laver Arena, the site of the 2019 Australian Open Finals.

The 2019 Australian Open was the 107th edition of the Australian Open. The tournament was run by the International Tennis Federation (ITF) and was part of the 2019 ATP Tour and the 2019 WTA Tour calendars under the Grand Slam category. The tournament consisted of both men's and women's singles and doubles draws as well as the mixed doubles events. There were singles and doubles events for both boys and girls (players under 18), which are part of the Grade A category of tournaments. There were also singles, doubles and quad events for men's and women's wheelchair tennis players as part of the NEC tour under the Grand Slam category. The tournament was played on hard courts at Melbourne Park, including three main show courts: Rod Laver Arena, Melbourne Arena and Margaret Court Arena. As in previous years, the tournament's main sponsor was Kia.

Final set tie-breaks were introduced for all match formats for the first time at the 2019 Australian Open. If a match reached 6–6 in the final set, the first player to score 10 points and be leading by at least 2 points won the match. Katie Boulter and Ekaterina Makarova were the first players in a main draw to compete in the new tie-break format.

For the first time in the men's singles competition, a 10-minute break due to heat was allowed after the third set when the Australian Open Heat Stress Scale reached 4.0 or higher. Hawkeye line-calling technology was extended to be included on all courts. A shot clock was introduced for the first time into the main draw, having been limited to qualifying only in 2018. Women gained parity in the qualifying competition as the draw was increased to 128 players in line with the men's draw.

In a five-year deal starting at the 2019 tournament, Dunlop took over from Wilson as the suppliers of the tennis balls.

Domestically, this was the first Australian Open to be broadcast by the Nine Network, after they secured the rights to televise the tournament from 2019 until 2024. Initially, the broadcast deal was to have started from 2020, however, the Seven Network, which had previously televised the event between 1973 and 2018, agreed to relinquish the rights to the 2019 tournament.

== Point and prize money distribution ==
=== Point distribution ===
Below is a series of tables for each of the competitions showing the ranking points offered for each event:

==== Senior points ====
Event	W	F	SF	QF	Round of 16	Round of 32	Round of 64	Round of 128	Q	Q3	Q2	Q1
Men's singles	2000	1200	720	360	180	90	45	10	25	16	8	0
Men's doubles	2000	1200	720	360	180	90	0	—N/a	—N/a	—N/a	—N/a	—N/a
Women's singles	2000	1300	780	430	240	130	70	10	40	30	20	2
Women's doubles	2000	1300	780	430	240	130	10	—N/a	—N/a	—N/a	—N/a	—N/a

==== Wheelchair points ====
Event	W	F	SF/3rd	QF/4th
Singles	800	500	375	100
Doubles	800	500	100	—N/a
Quad singles	800	500	100	—N/a
Quad doubles	800	100	—N/a	—N/a

==== Junior points ====
Event	W	F	SF	QF	Round of 16	Round of 32	Q	Q3
Boys' singles	1000	600	370	200	100	45	30	20
Girls' singles	1000	600	370	200	100	45	30	20
Boys' doubles	750	450	275	150	75	—N/a	—N/a	—N/a
Girls' doubles	750	450	275	150	75	—N/a	—N/a	—N/a

=== Prize money ===
The Australian Open total prize money for 2019 was increased by 14% to a tournament record A$62,500,000.

Event	W	F	SF	QF	Round of 16	Round of 32	Round of 64	Round of 128^{1}	Q3	Q2	Q1
Singles	A$4,100,000	A$2,050,000	A$920,000	A$460,000	A$260,000	A$155,000	A$105,000	A$75,000	A$40,000	A$25,000	A$15,000
Doubles *	A$750,000	A$375,000	A$190,000	A$100,000	A$55,000	A$32,500	A$21,000	—N/a	—N/a	—N/a	—N/a
Mixed doubles *	A$185,000	A$95,000	A$47,500	A$23,000	A$11,500	A$5,950	—N/a	—N/a	—N/a	—N/a	—N/a

^{1}Qualifiers prize money was also the Round of 128 prize money.
*per team

== Singles players ==
2019 Australian Open – Men's singles

Champion		Runner-up	
(Serbia) Novak Djokovic [1]		(Spain) Rafael Nadal [2]	
Semifinals out
(France) Lucas Pouille [28]		(Greece) Stefanos Tsitsipas [14]	
Quarterfinals out
(Japan) Kei Nishikori [8]	(Canada) Milos Raonic [16]	(Spain) Roberto Bautista Agut [22]	(United States) Frances Tiafoe
4th round out
(Russia) Daniil Medvedev [15]	(Spain) Pablo Carreño Busta [23]	(Germany) Alexander Zverev [4]	(Croatia) Borna Ćorić [11]
(Croatia) Marin Čilić [6]	(Switzerland) Roger Federer [3]	(Bulgaria) Grigor Dimitrov [20]	(Czech Republic) Tomáš Berdych
3rd round out
(Canada) Denis Shapovalov [25]	(Belgium) David Goffin [21]	(Italy) Fabio Fognini [12]	(Portugal) João Sousa
(Australia) Alex Bolt (WC)	(France) Pierre-Hugues Herbert	(Serbia) Filip Krajinović	(Australia) Alexei Popyrin (WC)
(Spain) Fernando Verdasco [26]	(Russia) Karen Khachanov [10]	(Georgia (country)) Nikoloz Basilashvili [19]	(United States) Taylor Fritz
(Italy) Andreas Seppi	(Italy) Thomas Fabbiano	(Argentina) Diego Schwartzman [18]	(Australia) Alex de Minaur [27]
2nd round out
(France) Jo-Wilfried Tsonga (WC)	(Japan) Taro Daniel	(Romania) Marius Copil	(United States) Ryan Harrison
(Argentina) Leonardo Mayer	(Belarus) Ilya Ivashka	(Germany) Philipp Kohlschreiber [32]	(Croatia) Ivo Karlović
(France) Jérémy Chardy	(France) Gilles Simon [29]	(South Korea) Chung Hyeon [24]	(Switzerland) Stan Wawrinka
(Hungary) Márton Fucsovics	(Russia) Evgeny Donskoy	(Germany) Maximilian Marterer	(Austria) Dominic Thiem [7]
(United States) Mackenzie McDonald	(Moldova) Radu Albot	(Australia) John Millman	(Japan) Yoshihito Nishioka
(Serbia) Viktor Troicki (Q)	(Italy) Stefano Travaglia (Q)	(France) Gaël Monfils [30]	(United Kingdom) Dan Evans (Q)
(South Africa) Kevin Anderson [5]	(Australia) Jordan Thompson	(Uruguay) Pablo Cuevas	(United States) Reilly Opelka
(Netherlands) Robin Haase	(United States) Denis Kudla	(Switzerland) Henri Laaksonen (Q)	(Australia) Matthew Ebden
1st round out
(United States) Mitchell Krueger (Q)	(Slovakia) Martin Kližan	(Australia) Thanasi Kokkinakis (Q)	(Spain) Pablo Andújar
(Chile) Cristian Garín	(Spain) Marcel Granollers	(Czech Republic) Jiří Veselý	(South Africa) Lloyd Harris (Q)
(Spain) Jaume Munar	(Chile) Nicolás Jarry	(Tunisia) Malek Jaziri	(Italy) Luca Vanni (Q)
(China) Li Zhe (WC)	(Argentina) Guido Pella	(Poland) Hubert Hurkacz	(Poland) Kamil Majchrzak (Q)
(Slovenia) Aljaž Bedene	(France) Ugo Humbert	(United States) Jack Sock (WC)	(United States) Bjorn Fratangelo (Q)
(United States) Bradley Klahn	(United States) Sam Querrey	(Latvia) Ernests Gulbis	(Australia) Nick Kyrgios
(Belgium) Steve Darcis (PR)	(Spain) Albert Ramos Viñolas	(Serbia) Laslo Đere	(Italy) Marco Cecchinato [17]
(Kazakhstan) Mikhail Kukushkin	(France) Gleb Sakharov (Q)	(Germany) Mischa Zverev	(France) Benoît Paire
(Australia) Bernard Tomic	(Russia) Andrey Rublev	(United States) Michael Mmoh	(Serbia) Miomir Kecmanović (Q)
(United Kingdom) Andy Murray (PR)	(Argentina) Federico Delbonis	(United States) Tennys Sandgren	(Germany) Peter Gojowczyk
(Italy) Matteo Berrettini	(Spain) Roberto Carballés Baena	(Argentina) Guido Andreozzi	(United States) Christopher Eubanks (Q)
(Bosnia and Herzegovina) Damir Džumhur	(United Kingdom) Cameron Norrie	(Japan) Tatsuma Ito (Q)	(Uzbekistan) Denis Istomin
(France) Adrian Mannarino	(India) Prajnesh Gunneswaran (Q)	(Spain) Feliciano López	(United States) Steve Johnson [31]
(Serbia) Janko Tipsarević (PR)	(Serbia) Dušan Lajović	(Australia) Jason Kubler (WC)	(United States) John Isner [9]
(United Kingdom) Kyle Edmund [13]	(Spain) Guillermo García López	(Australia) Marc Polmans (WC)	(Germany) Rudolf Molleker (Q)
(Portugal) Pedro Sousa	(Bosnia and Herzegovina) Mirza Bašić	(Germany) Jan-Lennard Struff	(Australia) James Duckworth (WC)

2019 Australian Open – Women's singles

Champion		Runner-up	
(Japan) Naomi Osaka [4]		(Czech Republic) Petra Kvitová [8]	
Semifinals out
(Czech Republic) Karolína Plíšková [7]		(United States) Danielle Collins	
Quarterfinals out
(United States) Serena Williams [16]	(Ukraine) Elina Svitolina [6]	(Australia) Ashleigh Barty [15]	(Russia) Anastasia Pavlyuchenkova
4th round out
(Romania) Simona Halep [1]	(Spain) Garbiñe Muguruza [18]	(Latvia) Anastasija Sevastova [13]	(United States) Madison Keys [17]
(United States) Amanda Anisimova	(Russia) Maria Sharapova [30]	(United States) Sloane Stephens [5]	(Germany) Angelique Kerber [2]
3rd round out
(United States) Venus Williams	(Ukraine) Dayana Yastremska	(Switzerland) Timea Bacsinszky (PR)	(Italy) Camila Giorgi [27]
(Chinese Taipei) Hsieh Su-wei [28]	(China) Wang Qiang [21]	(Belgium) Elise Mertens [12]	(China) Zhang Shuai
(Switzerland) Belinda Bencic	(Belarus) Aryna Sabalenka [11]	(Greece) Maria Sakkari	(Denmark) Caroline Wozniacki [3]
(Croatia) Petra Martić [31]	(Belarus) Aliaksandra Sasnovich	(France) Caroline Garcia [19]	(Australia) Kimberly Birrell (WC)
2nd round out
(United States) Sofia Kenin	(France) Alizé Cornet	(Spain) Carla Suárez Navarro [23]	(Canada) Eugenie Bouchard
(Russia) Natalia Vikhlyantseva (Q)	(United Kingdom) Johanna Konta	(Poland) Iga Świątek (Q)	(United States) Madison Brengle
(Slovenia) Tamara Zidanšek	(Germany) Laura Siegemund (PR)	(Serbia) Aleksandra Krunić	(Canada) Bianca Andreescu (Q)
(Russia) Margarita Gasparyan	(Russia) Anastasia Potapova	(Czech Republic) Kristýna Plíšková	(Slovakia) Viktória Kužmová
(Romania) Irina-Camelia Begu	(Kazakhstan) Yulia Putintseva	(Ukraine) Lesia Tsurenko [24]	(United Kingdom) Katie Boulter
(China) Wang Yafan	(Australia) Astra Sharma (Q)	(Sweden) Rebecca Peterson	(Sweden) Johanna Larsson
(Hungary) Tímea Babos	(Czech Republic) Markéta Vondroušová	(Estonia) Anett Kontaveit [20]	(Netherlands) Kiki Bertens [9]
(United States) Sachia Vickery	(Australia) Zoe Hives (WC)	(Croatia) Donna Vekić [29]	(Brazil) Beatriz Haddad Maia (Q)
1st round out
(Estonia) Kaia Kanepi	(Russia) Veronika Kudermetova (Q)	(Spain) Lara Arruabarrena	(Romania) Mihaela Buzărnescu [25]
(France) Clara Burel (WC)	(Australia) Samantha Stosur	(China) Peng Shuai (WC)	(Germany) Tatjana Maria
(Russia) Daria Kasatkina [10]	(United States) Varvara Lepchenko (Q)	(Australia) Ajla Tomljanović	(China) Zheng Saisai
(Slovenia) Dalila Jakupović	(Romania) Ana Bogdan	(Japan) Misaki Doi (Q)	(Czech Republic) Karolína Muchová (Q)
(Poland) Magda Linette	(Australia) Daria Gavrilova	(Belarus) Victoria Azarenka	(Switzerland) Stefanie Vögele
(France) Fiona Ferro	(Kazakhstan) Zarina Diyas	(United States) Whitney Osuigwe (WC)	(Germany) Mona Barthel
(Slovakia) Anna Karolína Schmiedlová	(China) Zhu Lin (Q)	(France) Pauline Parmentier	(Australia) Destanee Aiava (WC)
(Slovakia) Dominika Cibulková [26]	(Russia) Anna Blinkova	(Ukraine) Kateryna Kozlova	(Switzerland) Viktorija Golubic (Q)
(Slovakia) Magdaléna Rybáriková	(Germany) Andrea Petkovic	(Czech Republic) Kateřina Siniaková	(Czech Republic) Barbora Strýcová [32]
(Russia) Ekaterina Alexandrova	(Romania) Monica Niculescu	(Russia) Ekaterina Makarova	(Russia) Anna Kalinskaya (Q)
(Thailand) Luksika Kumkhum	(Australia) Ellen Perez (WC)	(Australia) Priscilla Hon (WC)	(Latvia) Jeļena Ostapenko [22]
(United Kingdom) Harriet Dart (Q)	(Romania) Sorana Cîrstea	(Belarus) Vera Lapko	(Belgium) Alison Van Uytvanck
(United States) Taylor Townsend	(Tunisia) Ons Jabeur	(Russia) Evgeniya Rodina	(United Kingdom) Heather Watson
(Spain) Sara Sorribes Tormo	(Belgium) Kirsten Flipkens	(Puerto Rico) Monica Puig	(United States) Alison Riske
(Germany) Julia Görges [14]	(Belgium) Ysaline Bonaventure (Q)	(United States) Bethanie Mattek-Sands (PR)	(France) Jessika Ponchet (Q)
(France) Kristina Mladenovic	(Spain) Paula Badosa Gibert (Q)	(United States) Bernarda Pera	(Slovenia) Polona Hercog

== Champions ==
=== Seniors ===
==== Men's singles ====
- (Serbia) Novak Djokovic def. (Spain) Rafael Nadal, 6–3, 6–2, 6–3

==== Women's singles ====
- (Japan) Naomi Osaka def. (Czech Republic) Petra Kvitová, 7–6^{(7–2)}, 5–7, 6–4

==== Men's doubles ====
- (France) Pierre-Hugues Herbert / (France) Nicolas Mahut def. (Finland) Henri Kontinen / (Australia) John Peers, 6–4, 7–6^{(7–1)}

==== Women's doubles ====
- (Australia) Samantha Stosur / (China) Zhang Shuai def. (Hungary) Tímea Babos / (France) Kristina Mladenovic, 6–3, 6–4

==== Mixed doubles ====
- (Czech Republic) Barbora Krejčíková / (United States) Rajeev Ram def. (Australia) Astra Sharma / (Australia) John-Patrick Smith, 7–6^{(7–3)}, 6–1

=== Juniors ===
==== Boys' singles ====
- (Italy) Lorenzo Musetti def. (United States) Emilio Nava, 4–6, 6–2, 7–6^{(14–12)}

==== Girls' singles ====
- (Denmark) Clara Tauson def. (Canada) Leylah Annie Fernandez, 6–4, 6–3

==== Boys' doubles ====
- (Czech Republic) Jonáš Forejtek / (Czech Republic) Dalibor Svrčina def. (United States) Cannon Kingsley / (United States) Emilio Nava, 7–6^{(7–5)}, 6–4

==== Girls' doubles ====
- (Japan) Natsumi Kawaguchi / (Hungary) Adrienn Nagy def. (United States) Chloe Beck / (United States) Emma Navarro, 6–4, 6–4

=== Legends ===
==== Men's legends' doubles ====
- (France) Mansour Bahrami / (Australia) Mark Philippoussis def. (Sweden) Jonas Björkman / (Sweden) Thomas Johansson, 4–3^{(5–3)}, 4–2

=== Wheelchair events ===
==== Wheelchair men's singles ====
- (Argentina) Gustavo Fernández def. (Sweden) Stefan Olsson, 7–5, 6–3

==== Wheelchair women's singles ====
- (Netherlands) Diede de Groot def. (Japan) Yui Kamiji, 6–0, 6–2

==== Wheelchair quad singles ====
- (Australia) Dylan Alcott def. (United States) David Wagner, 6–4, 7–6^{(7–2)}

==== Wheelchair men's doubles ====
- (Belgium) Joachim Gérard / (Sweden) Stefan Olsson def. (France) Stéphane Houdet / (Australia) Ben Weekes, 6–3, 6–2

==== Wheelchair women's doubles ====
- (Netherlands) Diede de Groot / (Netherlands) Aniek van Koot def. (Netherlands) Marjolein Buis / (Germany) Sabine Ellerbrock, 5–7, 7–6^{(7–4)}, [10–8]

==== Wheelchair quad doubles ====
- (Australia) Dylan Alcott / (Australia) Heath Davidson def. (United Kingdom) Andy Lapthorne / (United States) David Wagner, 6–3, 6–7^{(6–8)}, [12–10]

== Singles seeds ==
The following are the seeded players. Seedings are based on ATP and WTA rankings on 7 January 2019, while ranking and points before are as of 14 January 2019. Points after are as of 28 January 2019.

=== Men's singles ===
Seed	Rank	Player	Points before	Points defending	Points won	Points after	Status
1	1	(Serbia) Novak Djokovic	9,135	180	2,000	10,955	Champion, defeated (Spain) Rafael Nadal [2]
2	2	(Spain) Rafael Nadal	7,480	360	1,200	8,320	Runner-up, lost to (Serbia) Novak Djokovic [1]
3	3	(Switzerland) Roger Federer	6,420	2,000	180	4,600	Fourth round lost to (Greece) Stefanos Tsitsipas [14]
4	4	(Germany) Alexander Zverev	6,385	90	180	6,475	Fourth round lost to (Canada) Milos Raonic [16]
5	6	(South Africa) Kevin Anderson	4,810	10	45	4,845	Second round lost to (United States) Frances Tiafoe
6	7	(Croatia) Marin Čilić	4,160	1,200	180	3,140	Fourth round lost to (Spain) Roberto Bautista Agut [22]
7	8	(Austria) Dominic Thiem	4,095	180	45	3,960	Second round retired against (Australia) Alexei Popyrin [WC]
8	9	(Japan) Kei Nishikori	3,750	0	360	4,110	Quarterfinals retired against (Serbia) Novak Djokovic [1]
9	10	(United States) John Isner	3,155	10	10	3,155	First round lost to (United States) Reilly Opelka
10	11	(Russia) Karen Khachanov	2,835	45	90	2,880	Third round lost to (Spain) Roberto Bautista Agut [22]
11	12	(Croatia) Borna Ćorić	2,435	10	180	2,605	Fourth round lost to (France) Lucas Pouille [28]
12	13	(Italy) Fabio Fognini	2,315	180	90	2,225	Third round lost to (Spain) Pablo Carreño Busta [23]
13	14	(United Kingdom) Kyle Edmund	2,150	720	10	1,440	First round lost to (Czech Republic) Tomáš Berdych
14	15	(Greece) Stefanos Tsitsipas	2,095	10	720	2,805	Semifinals lost to (Spain) Rafael Nadal [2]
15	19	(Russia) Daniil Medvedev	1,865	45	180	2,000	Fourth round lost to (Serbia) Novak Djokovic [1]
16	17	(Canada) Milos Raonic	1,900	10	360	2,250	Quarterfinals lost to (France) Lucas Pouille [28]
17	18	(Italy) Marco Cecchinato	1,889	(29)^{†}	10	1,870	First round lost to (Serbia) Filip Krajinović
18	16	(Argentina) Diego Schwartzman	1,925	180	90	1,835	Third round lost to (Czech Republic) Tomáš Berdych
19	20	(Georgia (country)) Nikoloz Basilashvili	1,820	90	90	1,820	Third round lost to (Greece) Stefanos Tsitsipas [14]
20	21	(Bulgaria) Grigor Dimitrov	1,790	360	180	1,610	Fourth round lost to (United States) Frances Tiafoe
21	22	(Belgium) David Goffin	1,785	45	90	1,830	Third round lost to (Russia) Daniil Medvedev [15]
22	24	(Spain) Roberto Bautista Agut	1,605	10	360	1,955	Quarterfinals lost to (Greece) Stefanos Tsitsipas [14]
23	23	(Spain) Pablo Carreño Busta	1,705	180	180	1,705	Fourth round lost to (Japan) Kei Nishikori [8]
24	25	(South Korea) Chung Hyeon	1,585	720	45	910	Second round lost to (France) Pierre-Hugues Herbert
25	27	(Canada) Denis Shapovalov	1,440	45	90	1,485	Third round lost to (Serbia) Novak Djokovic [1]
26	28	(Spain) Fernando Verdasco	1,410	45	90	1,455	Third round lost to (Croatia) Marin Čilić [6]
27	29	(Australia) Alex de Minaur	1,353	0	90	1,443	Third round lost to (Spain) Rafael Nadal [2]
28	31	(France) Lucas Pouille	1,245	10	720	1,955	Semifinals lost to (Serbia) Novak Djokovic [1]
29	30	(France) Gilles Simon	1,280	45	45	1,280	Second round lost to (Australia) Alex Bolt [WC]
30	33	(France) Gaël Monfils	1,195	45	45	1,195	Second round lost to (United States) Taylor Fritz
31	34	(United States) Steve Johnson	1,190	10	10	1,190	First round lost to (Italy) Andreas Seppi
32	32	(Germany) Philipp Kohlschreiber	1,215	10	45	1,250	Second round lost to (Portugal) João Sousa

† The player did not qualify for the tournament in 2018. Accordingly, points for his 18th best result are deducted instead.

The following players would have been seeded, but they withdrew from the event.

Rank	Player	Points before	Points defending	Points after	Withdrawal reason
5	(Argentina) Juan Martín del Potro	5,150	90	5,060	Knee injury
26	(France) Richard Gasquet	1,535	90	1,445	Groin injury

=== Women's singles ===
Seed	Rank	Player	Points before	Points defending	Points won	Points after	Status
1	1	(Romania) Simona Halep	6,642	1,300	240	5,582	Fourth round lost to (United States) Serena Williams [16]
2	2	(Germany) Angelique Kerber	5,505	780	240	4,965	Fourth round lost to (United States) Danielle Collins
3	3	(Denmark) Caroline Wozniacki	5,436	2,000	130	3,566	Third round lost to (Russia) Maria Sharapova [30]
4	4	(Japan) Naomi Osaka	5,270	240	2,000	7,030	Champion, defeated (Czech Republic) Petra Kvitová [8]
5	5	(United States) Sloane Stephens	5,077	10	240	5,307	Fourth round lost to (Russia) Anastasia Pavlyuchenkova
6	7	(Ukraine) Elina Svitolina	4,940	430	430	4,940	Quarterfinals lost to (Japan) Naomi Osaka [4]
7	8	(Czech Republic) Karolína Plíšková	4,750	430	780	5,100	Semifinals lost to (Japan) Naomi Osaka [4]
8	6	(Czech Republic) Petra Kvitová	5,000	10	1,300	6,290	Runner-up, lost to (Japan) Naomi Osaka [4]
9	9	(Netherlands) Kiki Bertens	4,490	130	70	4,430	Second round lost to (Russia) Anastasia Pavlyuchenkova
10	10	(Russia) Daria Kasatkina	3,415	70	10	3,355	First round lost to (Switzerland) Timea Bacsinszky [PR]
11	11	(Belarus) Aryna Sabalenka	3,365	10	130	3,485	Third round lost to (United States) Amanda Anisimova
12	14	(Belgium) Elise Mertens	2,985	780	130	2,335	Third round lost to (United States) Madison Keys [17]
13	12	(Latvia) Anastasija Sevastova	3,160	70	240	3,330	Fourth round lost to (Japan) Naomi Osaka [4]
14	13	(Germany) Julia Görges	3,055	70	10	2,995	First round lost to (United States) Danielle Collins
15	15	(Australia) Ashleigh Barty	2,985	130	430	3,285	Quarterfinals lost to (Czech Republic) Petra Kvitová [8]
16	16	(United States) Serena Williams	2,976	0	430	3,406	Quarterfinals lost to (Czech Republic) Karolína Plíšková [7]
17	17	(United States) Madison Keys	2,976	430	240	2,786	Fourth round lost to (Ukraine) Elina Svitolina [6]
18	18	(Spain) Garbiñe Muguruza	2,865	70	240	3,035	Fourth round lost to (Czech Republic) Karolína Plíšková [7]
19	19	(France) Caroline Garcia	2,660	240	130	2,550	Third round lost to (United States) Danielle Collins
20	20	(Estonia) Anett Kontaveit	2,525	240	70	2,355	Second round lost to (Belarus) Aliaksandra Sasnovich
21	21	(China) Wang Qiang	2,485	10	130	2,605	Third round lost to (Latvia) Anastasija Sevastova [13]
22	22	(Latvia) Jeļena Ostapenko	2,362	130	10	2,242	First round lost to (Greece) Maria Sakkari
23	23	(Spain) Carla Suárez Navarro	2,153	430	70	1,793	Second round lost to (Ukraine) Dayana Yastremska
24	24	(Ukraine) Lesia Tsurenko	1,896	70	70	1,896	Second round lost to (United States) Amanda Anisimova
25	26	(Romania) Mihaela Buzărnescu	1,700	10	10	1,700	First round lost to (United States) Venus Williams
26	25	(Slovakia) Dominika Cibulková	1,735	10	10	1,735	First round lost to (China) Zhang Shuai
27	28	(Italy) Camila Giorgi	1,645	70	130	1,705	Third round lost to (Czech Republic) Karolína Plíšková [7]
28	27	(Chinese Taipei) Hsieh Su-wei	1,680	240	130	1,570	Third round lost to (Japan) Naomi Osaka [4]
29	29	(Croatia) Donna Vekić	1,580	70	70	1,580	Second round lost to (Australia) Kimberly Birrell [WC]
30	30	(Russia) Maria Sharapova	1,552	130	240	1,662	Fourth round lost to (Australia) Ashleigh Barty [15]
31	32	(Croatia) Petra Martić	1,465	240	130	1,355	Third round lost to (United States) Sloane Stephens [5]
32	34	(Czech Republic) Barbora Strýcová	1,331	240	10	1,101	First round lost to (Kazakhstan) Yulia Putintseva

== Doubles seeds ==
=== Men's doubles ===
Team		Rank	Seed
(Austria) Oliver Marach	(Croatia) Mate Pavić	7	1
(Colombia) Juan Sebastián Cabal	(Colombia) Robert Farah	10	2
(United Kingdom) Jamie Murray	(Brazil) Bruno Soares	14	3
(United States) Bob Bryan	(United States) Mike Bryan	15	4
(France) Pierre-Hugues Herbert	(France) Nicolas Mahut	23	5
(South Africa) Raven Klaasen	(New Zealand) Michael Venus	30	6
(Poland) Łukasz Kubot	(Argentina) Horacio Zeballos	39	7
(Japan) Ben McLachlan	(Germany) Jan-Lennard Struff	40	8
(Netherlands) Jean-Julien Rojer	(Romania) Horia Tecău	44	9
(United Kingdom) Dominic Inglot	(Croatia) Franko Škugor	46	10
(United States) Rajeev Ram	(United Kingdom) Joe Salisbury	48	11
(Finland) Henri Kontinen	(Australia) John Peers	57	12
(Croatia) Ivan Dodig	(France) Édouard Roger-Vasselin	61	13
(Spain) Feliciano López	(Spain) Marc López	65	14
(India) Rohan Bopanna	(India) Divij Sharan	68	15
(Netherlands) Robin Haase	(Netherlands) Matwé Middelkoop	74	16

- ^{1} Rankings are as of 7 January 2019.

=== Women's doubles ===
Team		Rank	Seed
(Czech Republic) Barbora Krejčíková	(Czech Republic) Kateřina Siniaková	2	1
(Hungary) Tímea Babos	(France) Kristina Mladenovic	6	2
(Canada) Gabriela Dabrowski	(China) Xu Yifan	23	3
(United States) Nicole Melichar	(Czech Republic) Květa Peschke	25	4
(Slovenia) Andreja Klepač	(Spain) María José Martínez Sánchez	36	5
(Czech Republic) Lucie Hradecká	(Russia) Ekaterina Makarova	37	6
(Chinese Taipei) Chan Hao-ching	(Chinese Taipei) Latisha Chan	43	7
(Chinese Taipei) Hsieh Su-wei	(United States) Abigail Spears	47	8
(United States) Raquel Atawo	(Slovenia) Katarina Srebotnik	49	9
(Romania) Irina-Camelia Begu	(Romania) Mihaela Buzărnescu	51	10
(Japan) Eri Hozumi	(Poland) Alicja Rosolska	62	11
(Germany) Anna-Lena Grönefeld	(United States) Vania King	63	12
(Belgium) Kirsten Flipkens	(Sweden) Johanna Larsson	72	13
(Japan) Miyu Kato	(Japan) Makoto Ninomiya	73	14
(United States) Bethanie Mattek-Sands	(Netherlands) Demi Schuurs	75	15
(China) Peng Shuai	(China) Yang Zhaoxuan	77	16

- ^{1} Rankings are as of 7 January 2019.

=== Mixed doubles ===
Team		Rank	Seed
(Canada) Gabriela Dabrowski	(Croatia) Mate Pavić	13	1
(United States) Nicole Melichar	(Brazil) Bruno Soares	21	2
(Czech Republic) Barbora Krejčíková	(United States) Rajeev Ram	22	3
(Romania) Mihaela Buzărnescu	(Austria) Oliver Marach	29	4
(Germany) Anna-Lena Grönefeld	(Colombia) Robert Farah	31	5
(United States) Abigail Spears	(Colombia) Juan Sebastián Cabal	35	6
(Japan) Makoto Ninomiya	(Japan) Ben McLachlan	39	7
(Russia) Ekaterina Makarova	(New Zealand) Artem Sitak	41	8

- ^{1} Rankings are as of 7 January 2019.

== Main draw wildcard entries ==
=== Men's singles ===
- (Australia) Alex Bolt
- (Australia) James Duckworth
- (Australia) Jason Kubler
- (China) Li Zhe
- (Australia) Marc Polmans
- (Australia) Alexei Popyrin
- (United States) Jack Sock
- (France) Jo-Wilfried Tsonga

=== Women's singles ===
- (Australia) Destanee Aiava
- (Australia) Kimberly Birrell
- (France) Clara Burel
- (Australia) Zoe Hives
- (Australia) Priscilla Hon
- (United States) Whitney Osuigwe
- (China) Peng Shuai
- (Australia) Ellen Perez

=== Men's doubles ===
- (Australia) Alex Bolt / (Australia) Marc Polmans
- (Australia) James Duckworth / (Australia) Jordan Thompson
- (Australia) Blake Ellis / (Australia) Alexei Popyrin
- (China) Gong Maoxin / (China) Zhang Ze
- (Australia) Lleyton Hewitt / (Australia) John-Patrick Smith
- (Australia) Nick Kyrgios / (Australia) Matt Reid
- (Australia) Max Purcell / (Australia) Luke Saville

=== Women's doubles ===
- (Australia) Destanee Aiava / (Australia) Naiktha Bains
- (Australia) Alison Bai / (Australia) Zoe Hives
- (Australia) Kimberly Birrell / (Australia) Priscilla Hon
- (Australia) Lizette Cabrera / (Australia) Jaimee Fourlis
- (Chinese Taipei) Chang Kai-chen / (Chinese Taipei) Hsu Ching-wen
- (Australia) Ellen Perez / (Australia) Arina Rodionova
- (Australia) Astra Sharma / (Australia) Isabelle Wallace

=== Mixed doubles ===
- (Australia) Monique Adamczak / (Australia) Matt Reid
- (Australia) Priscilla Hon / (Australia) Alexei Popyrin
- (Australia) Maddison Inglis / (Australia) Jason Kubler
- (Australia) Jessica Moore / (Australia) Andrew Whittington
- (Australia) Astra Sharma / (Australia) John-Patrick Smith
- (Australia) Samantha Stosur / (India) Leander Paes
- (Poland) Iga Świątek / (Poland) Łukasz Kubot
- (China) Zhang Shuai / (Australia) John Peers

== Main draw qualifier entries ==
=== Men's singles ===
1. (Japan) Tatsuma Ito
2. (United States) Christopher Eubanks
3. (United States) Bjorn Fratangelo
4. (United Kingdom) Dan Evans
5. (Switzerland) Henri Laaksonen
6. (India) Prajnesh Gunneswaran
7. (France) Gleb Sakharov
8. (Italy) Stefano Travaglia
9. (Germany) Rudolf Molleker
10. (Australia) Thanasi Kokkinakis
11. (South Africa) Lloyd Harris
12. (Italy) Luca Vanni
13. (United States) Mitchell Krueger
14. (Serbia) Viktor Troicki
15. (Poland) Kamil Majchrzak
16. (Serbia) Miomir Kecmanović

=== Women's singles ===
1. (Australia) Astra Sharma
2. (Japan) Misaki Doi
3. (Switzerland) Viktorija Golubic
4. (Canada) Bianca Andreescu
5. (Czech Republic) Karolína Muchová
6. (Poland) Iga Świątek
7. (Russia) Veronika Kudermetova
8. (Russia) Anna Kalinskaya
9. (Spain) Paula Badosa Gibert
10. (United Kingdom) Harriet Dart
11. (China) Zhu Lin
12. (United States) Varvara Lepchenko
13. (France) Jessika Ponchet
14. (Belgium) Ysaline Bonaventure
15. (Russia) Natalia Vikhlyantseva
16. (Brazil) Beatriz Haddad Maia

== Protected ranking ==
The following players have been accepted directly into the main draw using a protected ranking:

Men's singles

- (United Kingdom) Andy Murray (2)
- (Serbia) Janko Tipsarević (88)
- (Belgium) Steve Darcis (90)

Women's singles

- (Switzerland) Timea Bacsinszky (23)
- (Germany) Laura Siegemund (32)
- (United States) Bethanie Mattek-Sands (90)

== Withdrawals ==
The following players were accepted directly into the main tournament, but withdrew due to injuries or other reasons

Before the tournament

Men's singles

- (Argentina) Juan Martín del Potro → replaced by (Portugal) Pedro Sousa
- (France) Richard Gasquet → replaced by (France) Ugo Humbert
- (Slovakia) Jozef Kovalík → replaced by (United States) Michael Mmoh
- (Canada) Vasek Pospisil → replaced by (Spain) Guillermo García López

Women's singles

- (United States) CoCo Vandeweghe → replaced by (United States) Sachia Vickery

== Sponsors ==
- Luzhou Laojiao
- Emirates
- Kia Motors
- ANZ
- AccorHotels
- Blackmores
- Infosys
- MasterCard
- Rolex
- Ganten Baisuishan
- DeRucci
- Lavazza
- Barilla Group
- CPA Australia

Preceded by 2018 US Open	Grand Slams	Succeeded by 2019 French Open
