= Serbia at the 2022 European Youth Summer Olympic Festival =

in (Slovakia) Banská Bystrica 24 July 2022 – 30 July 2022
- Competitors: 59 in 10 sports
- Medals Ranked 20th: Gold 2 Silver 3 Bronze 1 Total 6

European Youth Summer Olympic Festival appearances
- 2007 • 2009 • 2011 • 2013 • 2015 • 2017 • 2019 • 2022 • 2023 • 2025

Serbia competed at the 2022 European Youth Summer Olympic Festival in Banská Bystrica, Slovakia from 24 to 30 July 2022. The Serbian team won a total of 6 medals: 2 gold, 3 silver, and 1 bronze, finishing 20th in the overall medal table.

== Medalists ==
| Medal | Athlete(s) | Sport | Event |
|---|---|---|---|
| Gold | Maša Rajić | Athletics | Girls' 800m |
| Gold | Miljan Radulj | Judo | Boys' –90 kg |
| Silver | Nikolina Nišavić | Judo | Girls' –52 kg |
| Silver | Nikolina Pejatović | Athletics | Girls' high jump |
| Silver | Mihajlo Simin | Judo | Boys' –73 kg |
| Bronze | Ognjen Pilipović, Matija Rađenović, Justin Cvetkov, Petar Popović | Swimming | Boys' 4×100m freestyle relay |
