= 2019 Australian Open – Women's doubles =

Women's doubles
- 2019 Australian Open

Final
- Champions: (Australia) Samantha Stosur (China) Zhang Shuai
- Runners-up: (Hungary) Tímea Babos (France) Kristina Mladenovic
- Score: 6–3, 6–4

Details
- Draw: 64
- Seeds: 16

Events
Singles	men	women		boys	girls
Doubles	men	women	mixed	boys	girls
WC Singles	men	women	quad
WC Doubles	men	women	quad
Legends	men	women	mixed
- Australian Open

Samantha Stosur and Zhang Shuai defeated defending champions Tímea Babos and Kristina Mladenovic in the final, 6–3, 6–4 to win the women's doubles tennis title at the 2019 Australian Open.

Ekaterina Makarova was attempting to complete the Career Super Slam in doubles. Partnering Lucie Hradecká, they lost to Irina Bara and Monica Niculescu in the second round.

Kateřina Siniaková retained the WTA no. 1 doubles ranking after reaching the third round with Barbora Krejčíková. Barbora Strýcová was also in contention for the top ranking at the start of the tournament.

== Seeds ==
1. (Czech Republic) Barbora Krejčíková / (Czech Republic) Kateřina Siniaková (quarterfinals)
2. (Hungary) Tímea Babos / (France) Kristina Mladenovic (final)
3. (Canada) Gabriela Dabrowski / (China) Xu Yifan (first round)
4. (United States) Nicole Melichar / (Czech Republic) Květa Peschke (third round)
5. (Slovenia) Andreja Klepač / (Spain) María José Martínez Sánchez (quarterfinals)
6. (Czech Republic) Lucie Hradecká / (Russia) Ekaterina Makarova (second round)
7. (Chinese Taipei) Chan Hao-ching / (Chinese Taipei) Latisha Chan (quarterfinals)
8. (Chinese Taipei) Hsieh Su-wei / (United States) Abigail Spears (second round)

9. (United States) Raquel Atawo / (Slovenia) Katarina Srebotnik (quarterfinals)
10. (Romania) Irina-Camelia Begu / (Romania) Mihaela Buzărnescu (second round)
11. (Japan) Eri Hozumi / (Poland) Alicja Rosolska (second round)
12. (Germany) Anna-Lena Grönefeld / (United States) Vania King (first round)
13. (Belgium) Kirsten Flipkens / (Sweden) Johanna Larsson (third round)
14. (Japan) Miyu Kato / (Japan) Makoto Ninomiya (first round)
15. (United States) Bethanie Mattek-Sands / (Netherlands) Demi Schuurs (first round)
16. (China) Peng Shuai / (China) Yang Zhaoxuan (first round)

Click on the seed number of a player to go to their draw section.

== Draw ==
Key

- Q = Qualifier
- WC = Wild card
- LL = Lucky loser
- Alt = Alternate
- ITF = ITF entry
- PR = Protected ranking
- SR = Special ranking
- SE = Special exempt
- JE = Junior exempt
- JR = Junior Accelerator Programme entrant
- CO = College Accelerator Programme entrant
- NG = Next Gen Accelerator Program entrant
- w/o = Walkover
- r = Retired
- d = Defaulted

=== Finals ===
Quarterfinals
1	(Czech Republic) Barbora Krejčíková (Czech Republic) Kateřina Siniaková	6^{2}	6^{4}
(Australia) Samantha Stosur (China) Zhang Shuai	7^{7}	7^{7}
(Czech Republic) Barbora Strýcová (Czech Republic) Markéta Vondroušová	6	6
5	(Slovenia) Andreja Klepač (Spain) María José Martínez Sánchez	4	4
7	(Chinese Taipei) Chan Hao-ching (Chinese Taipei) Latisha Chan	3	6^{3}
(United States) Jennifer Brady (United States) Alison Riske	6	7^{7}
9	(United States) Raquel Atawo (Slovenia) Katarina Srebotnik	4	5
2	(Hungary) Tímea Babos (France) Kristina Mladenovic	6	7

Semifinals
(Australia) Samantha Stosur (China) Zhang Shuai	7	4	7
(Czech Republic) Barbora Strýcová (Czech Republic) Markéta Vondroušová	5	6	5
(United States) Jennifer Brady (United States) Alison Riske	4	2
2	(Hungary) Tímea Babos (France) Kristina Mladenovic	6	6

Final
(Australia) Samantha Stosur (China) Zhang Shuai	6	6
2	(Hungary) Tímea Babos (France) Kristina Mladenovic	3	4

=== Top half ===
==== Section 1 ====
First round
1	(Czech Republic) B Krejčíková (Czech Republic) K Siniaková	6	6
(Romania) A Bogdan (Australia) An Rodionova	2	2
(Serbia) A Krunić (China) S Zheng	1	4
(Australia) M Adamczak (Australia) J Moore	6	6
(Russia) V Kudermetova (United States) S Santamaria	6	6
(Switzerland) B Bencic (Croatia) D Vekić	3	1
(Belgium) E Mertens (Belarus) A Sabalenka	6	3	6
15	(United States) B Mattek-Sands (Netherlands) D Schuurs	2	6	3
10	(Romania) I-C Begu (Romania) M Buzărnescu	7	3	6
WC	(Australia) L Cabrera (Australia) J Fourlis	5	6	4
(France) A Cornet (Croatia) P Martić	2	6	6
(Poland) M Linette (Australia) A Tomljanović	6	0	0
(Slovakia) V Kužmová (Slovakia) M Rybáriková	6^{3}	2
(Australia) S Stosur (China) S Zhang	7^{7}	6
(United States) B Pera (Sweden) R Peterson	3	4
8	(Chinese Taipei) S-w Hsieh (United States) A Spears	6	6

Second round
1	(Czech Republic) B Krejčíková (Czech Republic) K Siniaková	6	6
(Australia) M Adamczak (Australia) J Moore	4	4
(Russia) V Kudermetova (United States) S Santamaria	6^{3}	2
(Belgium) E Mertens (Belarus) A Sabalenka	7^{7}	6
10	(Romania) I-C Begu (Romania) M Buzărnescu	6	3	1
(France) A Cornet (Croatia) P Martić	2	6	6
(Australia) S Stosur (China) S Zhang	7^{8}	6
8	(Chinese Taipei) S-w Hsieh (United States) A Spears	6^{6}	2

Third round
1	(Czech Republic) B Krejčíková (Czech Republic) K Siniaková	2	6	6
(Belgium) E Mertens (Belarus) A Sabalenka	6	2	3
(France) A Cornet (Croatia) P Martić	5	3
(Australia) S Stosur (China) S Zhang	7	6

Quarterfinals
1	(Czech Republic) B Krejčiková (Czech Republic) K Siniaková	6^{2}	6^{4}
(Australia) S Stosur (China) S Zhang	7^{7}	7^{7}

==== Section 2 ====
First round
3	(Canada) G Dabrowski (China) Y Xu	2	6	3
(Czech Republic) B Strýcová (Czech Republic) M Vondroušová	6	3	6
(Slovenia) D Jakupović (Russia) I Khromacheva	3	4
(Kazakhstan) Z Diyas (Kazakhstan) Y Putintseva	6	6
Alt	(Thailand) L Kumkhum (Russia) E Rodina	6	3	4
WC	(Australia) A Bai (Australia) Z Hives	2	6	6
(Japan) N Hibino (United States) D Krawczyk	3	6	6
14	(Japan) M Kato (Japan) M Ninomiya	6	4	3
12	(Germany) A-L Grönefeld (United States) V King	4	3
(Japan) S Aoyama (Belarus) L Marozava	6	6
WC	(Chinese Taipei) K-c Chang (Chinese Taipei) C-w Hsu	1	2
(United States) K Christian (United States) A Muhammad	6	6
(Romania) S Cîrstea (Latvia) J Ostapenko	6	6^{3}	7^{10}
(China) Y Duan (Belarus) V Lapko	2	7^{7}	6^{7}
WC	(Australia) D Aiava (Australia) N Bains	2	6^{6}
5	(Slovenia) A Klepač (Spain) MJ Martínez Sánchez	6	7^{8}

Second round
(Czech Republic) B Strýcová (Czech Republic) M Vondroušová	6	6
(Kazakhstan) Z Diyas (Kazakhstan) Y Putintseva	2	2
WC	(Australia) A Bai (Australia) Z Hives	2	1
(Japan) N Hibino (United States) D Krawczyk	6	6
(Japan) S Aoyama (Belarus) L Marozava	5	5
(United States) K Christian (United States) A Muhammad	7	7
(Romania) S Cîrstea (Latvia) J Ostapenko	5	3
5	(Slovenia) A Klepač (Spain) MJ Martínez Sánchez	7	6

Third round
(Czech Republic) B Strýcová (Czech Republic) M Vondroušová	6	6
(Japan) N Hibino (United States) D Krawczyk	2	4
(United States) K Christian (United States) A Muhammad	2	2
5	(Slovenia) A Klepač (Spain) MJ Martínez Sánchez	6	6

Quarterfinals
(Czech Republic) B Strýcová (Czech Republic) M Vondroušová	6	6
5	(Slovenia) A Klepač (Spain) MJ Martínez Sánchez	4	4

=== Bottom half ===
==== Section 3 ====
First round
7	(Chinese Taipei) H-c Chan (Chinese Taipei) L Chan	6	7
WC	(Australia) E Perez (Australia) Ar Rodionova	3	5
(France) P Parmentier (Greece) M Sakkari	3	4
(China) X Jiang (China) Q Wang	6	6
(Chile) A Guarachi (Belgium) A Van Uytvanck	6^{3}	2
(Belarus) A Sasnovich (United States) T Townsend	7^{7}	6
(Germany) A Petkovic (Puerto Rico) M Puig	5	4
11	(Japan) E Hozumi (Poland) A Rosolska	7	6
16	(China) S Peng (China) Z Yang	5	6	5
(Belarus) V Azarenka (Australia) A Barty	7	4	7
WC	(Australia) A Sharma (Australia) I Wallace	6	3	2
(United States) J Brady (United States) A Riske	4	6	6
(Ukraine) N Kichenok (China) Y Wang	6	6
(Georgia (country)) O Kalashnikova (Ukraine) D Yastremska	4	2
(Germany) T Maria (United Kingdom) H Watson	1	6	4
4	(United States) N Melichar (Czech Republic) K Peschke	6	4	6

Second round
7	(Chinese Taipei) H-c Chan (Chinese Taipei) L Chan	6	6
(China) X Jiang (China) Q Wang	2	3
(Belarus) A Sasnovich (United States) T Townsend	6	7^{8}
11	(Japan) E Hozumi (Poland) A Rosolska	2	6^{6}
(Belarus) V Azarenka (Australia) A Barty
(United States) J Brady (United States) A Riske	w/o
(Ukraine) N Kichenok (China) Y Wang	4	3
4	(United States) N Melichar (Czech Republic) K Peschke	6	6

Third round
7	(Chinese Taipei) H-c Chan (Chinese Taipei) L Chan	7	7
(Belarus) A Sasnovich (United States) T Townsend	5	5
(United States) J Brady (United States) A Riske	6	6
4	(United States) N Melichar (Czech Republic) K Peschke	3	4

Quarterfinals
7	(Chinese Taipei) H-c Chan (Chinese Taipei) L Chan	3	6^{3}
(United States) J Brady (United States) A Riske	6	7^{7}

==== Section 4 ====
First round
6	(Czech Republic) L Hradecká (Russia) E Makarova	6	6
(Germany) M Barthel (United States) S Kenin	3	3
(Romania) I Bara (Romania) M Niculescu	6	6
(Spain) L Arruabarrena (Spain) A Parra Santonja	1	1
PR	(Russia) A Panova (Germany) L Siegemund	3	2
(Russia) M Gasparyan (Australia) D Gavrilova	6	6
(United States) A Anisimova (United States) D Collins	1	3
9	(United States) R Atawo (Slovenia) K Srebotnik	6	6
13	(Belgium) K Flipkens (Sweden) J Larsson	6	6
(Switzerland) T Bacsinszky (Russia) V Zvonareva	4	3
WC	(Australia) K Birrell (Australia) P Hon	4	6	4
(United Kingdom) H Dart (Estonia) A Kontaveit	6	2	6
(Russia) A Pavlyuchenkova (Latvia) A Sevastova	7^{7}	3	4
(China) X Han (Croatia) D Jurak	6^{4}	6	6
(Romania) R Olaru (Kazakhstan) G Voskoboeva	0	3
2	(Hungary) T Babos (France) K Mladenovic	6	6

Second round
6	(Czech Republic) L Hradecká (Russia) E Makarova	4	6^{8}
(Romania) I Bara (Romania) M Niculescu	6	7^{10}
(Russia) M Gasparyan (Australia) D Gavrilova	2	4
9	(United States) R Atawo (Slovenia) K Srebotnik	6	6
13	(Belgium) K Flipkens (Sweden) J Larsson	6	6
(United Kingdom) H Dart (Estonia) A Kontaveit	2	4
(China) X Han (Croatia) D Jurak	6	1	0
2	(Hungary) T Babos (France) K Mladenovic	2	6	6

Third round
(Romania) I Bara (Romania) M Niculescu	2	6	3
9	(United States) R Atawo (Slovenia) K Srebotnik	6	3	6
13	(Belgium) K Flipkens (Sweden) J Larsson	1	4
2	(Hungary) T Babos (France) K Mladenovic	6	6

Quarterfinals
9	(United States) R Atawo (Slovenia) K Srebotnik	4	5
2	(Hungary) T Babos (France) K Mladenovic	6	7

== Other entry information ==
=== Wild cards ===
- (Australia) Destanee Aiava / (Australia) Naiktha Bains
- (Australia) Alison Bai / (Australia) Zoe Hives
- (Australia) Lizette Cabrera / (Australia) Jaimee Fourlis
- (Australia) Kimberly Birrell / (Australia) Priscilla Hon
- (Australia) Astra Sharma / (Australia) Isabelle Wallace
- (Australia) Ellen Perez / (Australia) Arina Rodionova
- (Chinese Taipei) Chang Kai-chen / (Chinese Taipei) Hsu Ching-wen

=== Protected ranking ===
- (Russia) Alexandra Panova / (Germany) Laura Siegemund
