= Tennis at the 2019 Island Games =

- Dates: 7–12 July

Tennis at the 2019 Island Games was held at the Bayside Sports Complex and the Gibraltar Sandpits Lawn Tennis Club in Gibraltar in July 2019.

== Medal table ==
* Host nation (Gibraltar)

Rank	Nation	Gold	Silver	Bronze	Total
1	Jersey	4	0	2	6
2	Gibraltar*	3	0	0	3
3	Isle of Man	0	3	2	5
4	Menorca	0	2	3	5
5	Bermuda	0	1	2	3
6	Gotland	0	1	1	2
7	Åland	0	0	3	3
8	Guernsey	0	0	1	1
Totals (8 entries)		7	7	14	28

== Results ==
Event	Gold	Silver	Bronze
Men's singles	Stuart Parker; Jersey	Oscar Mesquida-Berg; Menorca	Gavin Manders; Bermuda
Men's singles	Stuart Parker; Jersey	Oscar Mesquida-Berg; Menorca	Miguel Albertí-Fuster; Menorca
Women's singles	Amanda Carreras; Gibraltar	Tsvetelina Havrén; Gotland	Clara Catchot-Sintes; Menorca
Women's singles	Amanda Carreras; Gibraltar	Tsvetelina Havrén; Gotland	Laura Feely; Isle of Man
Men's doubles	Jersey; Stuart Parker; Michael Watkins	Bermuda; Gavin Manders; David Thomas	Menorca; Alex Mesquida-Berg; Oscar Mesquida-Berg
Men's doubles	Jersey; Stuart Parker; Michael Watkins	Bermuda; Gavin Manders; David Thomas	Åland Islands; Otto Byman; Henrique Norbiato
Women's doubles	Gibraltar; Amanda Carreras; Lindsay De Haro-Sene	Isle of Man; Karen Faragher; Laura Feely	Åland Islands; Pauline Friman; Malin Ringbom
Women's doubles	Gibraltar; Amanda Carreras; Lindsay De Haro-Sene	Isle of Man; Karen Faragher; Laura Feely	Jersey; Natasha Forrest; Eva Hurst
Mixed doubles	Jersey; Jeremy Cross; Antonija Sokic	Isle of Man; Marc Chinn; Karen Faragher	Gotland; Alec Arho-Havrén; Tsvetelina Havrén
Mixed doubles	Jersey; Jeremy Cross; Antonija Sokic	Isle of Man; Marc Chinn; Karen Faragher	Åland Islands; Henrique Norbiato; Malin Ringbom
Men's team	Jersey; Jeremy Cross; Jack Hodges; Stuart Parker; Michael Watkins	Menorca; Miguel Alberti-Fuster; Josep Coll-Llopis; Alex Mesquida-Berg; Oscar Mesquida-Berg; David Riera-Pons	Bermuda; Samuel Butler; James Finnigan; Gavin Manders; Scott Redmond; David Thomas
Men's team	Jersey; Jeremy Cross; Jack Hodges; Stuart Parker; Michael Watkins	Menorca; Miguel Alberti-Fuster; Josep Coll-Llopis; Alex Mesquida-Berg; Oscar Mesquida-Berg; David Riera-Pons	Isle of Man; James Buxton; Marc Chinn; Robert Comber; Sean Drewry
Women's team	Gibraltar; Ewa Bielanowicz; Amanda Carreras; Lindsay De Haro-Sene; Melanie McLeod; Bianca Seromenho	Isle of Man; Karen Faragher; Laura Feely; Katie Harris; Elena Snidal; Hannah Snidal	Guernsey; Lauren Barker; Joanna Dyer; Natalie Le Cras; Lauren Smeed
Women's team	Gibraltar; Ewa Bielanowicz; Amanda Carreras; Lindsay De Haro-Sene; Melanie McLeod; Bianca Seromenho	Isle of Man; Karen Faragher; Laura Feely; Katie Harris; Elena Snidal; Hannah Snidal	Jersey; Clare Clarke; Natasha Forrest; Eva Hurst; Antonija Sokic
