= 2019 European Youth Summer Olympic Festival =

- Host city: Baku
- Country: Azerbaijan
- Nations: 48
- Athletes: 3,902
- Sport: 10
- Events: 135
- Opening: July 21, 2019
- Closing: July 27, 2019
- Opened by: Ilham Aliyev
- Athlete's Oath: Fakhriyya Tagizade; Sabir Jafarov
- Judge's Oath: Alakbar Hasanov; Sadi Quliyev (Officials); Ramiz Ramizzade; Asgarkhan Novruzov (Coaches)
- Torch lighter: Farid Mansurov
- Main venue: Baku Crystal Hall (opening ceremony)

Summer

Winter

The 2019 European Youth Summer Olympic Festival was held in Baku, Azerbaijan, between 21 and 27 July 2019.

== Sports ==
The following competitions took place:

2019 European Youth Summer Olympic Festival Sports Programme
- Artistic gymnastics (14)
- Athletics (40)
- Basketball (2)
- Cycling (4)
- Handball (2)
- Judo (17)
- Swimming (32)
- Tennis (4)
- Volleyball (2)
- Wrestling (18)

== Venues ==
Venue	Location	Sports
Baku Crystal Hall	Baku	Opening Ceremony, Closing Ceremony
Tofig Bahramov Stadium	Baku	Athletics
National Gymnastics Arena	Baku	Artistic gymnastics
Velopark + Baku city roads	Baku	Cycling
Baku Sports Hall	Baku	Handball
Baku Tennis Academy	Baku	Tennis
Baku Aquatics Center	Baku	Swimming
Sarhadchi Arena	Baku	Basketball
Heydar Aliyev Arena	Baku	Judo, Wrestling
ABU Arena	Baku	Handball
Darnagul Arena	Baku	Volleyball
MES Sport and Health Center	Baku	Volleyball
European Azerbaijan School	Baku	Basketball

== Schedule ==
The competition schedule for the 2019 European Youth Olympic Summer Festival is as follows:

OC	Opening ceremony	1	Event finals	CC	Closing ceremony	●	Event competitions

July	21 Sun	22 Mon	23 Tue	24 Wed	25 Thu	26 Fri	27 Sat	Events
Ceremonies	OC						CC	
Artistic gymnastics			1	1	2	5	5	14
Athletics		1	8	4	11	7	9	40
Basketball		●	●	●		●	2	2
Cycling			2		2			4
Handball		●	●	●		●	2	2
Judo				6	5	5	1	17
Swimming		2	8	6	5	11		32
Tennis	●	●	●	●	●	2	2	4
Volleyball		●	●	●		●	2	2
Wrestling	4	7	7					18
Total events	4	10	26	17	25	30	23	135
Cumulative total	4	14	40	57	82	112	135	135
July	21 Sun	22 Mon	23 Tue	24 Wed	25 Thu	26 Fri	27 Sat	Events

== Participant nations ==
48 EOCs participated in the EYOF 2019. Armenia decided to boycott the EYOF. Liechtenstein did not compete. One refugee athlete, originally from Eritrea, and at that time based in Israel, competed at these games.

Participating National Olympic Committees
- Albania
- Andorra
- Austria
- Azerbaijan
- Belarus
- Belgium
- Bosnia and Herzegovina
- Bulgaria
- Croatia
- Cyprus
- Czech Republic
- Denmark
- EOC Refugee Team (1)
- Estonia (44)
- Finland
- France
- (Georgia (country)) Georgia
- Germany
- (United Kingdom) Great Britain
- Greece
- Hungary
- Iceland
- (Republic of Ireland) Ireland
- Israel
- Italy
- Kosovo (18)
- Latvia
- Lithuania
- Luxembourg
- Malta
- Moldova
- Monaco
- Montenegro
- Netherlands
- North Macedonia
- Norway
- Poland
- Portugal
- Romania
- Russia
- San Marino
- Serbia
- Slovakia
- Slovenia
- Spain
- Sweden
- Switzerland
- Turkey (126)
- Ukraine

== Medal table ==
* Host nation (Azerbaijan)

Rank	Nation	Gold	Silver	Bronze	Total
1	Russia	28	16	21	65
2	Great Britain	11	12	2	25
3	Turkey	11	6	10	27
4	Azerbaijan*	10	7	6	23
5	Italy	8	9	9	26
6	Ukraine	8	7	10	25
7	Spain	7	4	10	21
8	France	6	8	14	28
9	Poland	6	3	6	15
10	Belarus	6	2	6	14
11	Romania	4	10	5	19
12	Germany	4	7	15	26
13	Croatia	4	1	0	5
14	Sweden	3	1	2	6
15	Estonia	3	0	2	5
16	Netherlands	2	3	4	9
17	Finland	2	3	1	6
18	Czech Republic	2	1	3	6
19	Ireland	2	0	2	4
20	Norway	1	6	2	9
21	Georgia	1	5	8	14
22	Denmark	1	1	3	5
23	Bulgaria	1	1	0	2
24	Cyprus	1	0	2	3
25	Israel	1	0	1	2
26	Austria	1	0	0	1
26	Kosovo	1	0	0	1
28	Hungary	0	9	12	21
29	Belgium	0	5	2	7
30	Moldova	0	2	3	5
31	Switzerland	0	2	2	4
32	Greece	0	1	3	4
32	Serbia	0	1	3	4
34	Lithuania	0	1	0	1
34	Portugal	0	1	0	1
36	Latvia	0	0	1	1
36	Slovakia	0	0	1	1
36	Slovenia	0	0	1	1
Totals (38 entries)		135	135	172	442
