= 2019 Australian Open – Men's singles =

Men's singles
- 2019 Australian Open

Final
- Champion: (Serbia) Novak Djokovic
- Runner-up: (Spain) Rafael Nadal
- Score: 6–3, 6–2, 6–3

Details
- Draw: 128 (16Q / 8WC)
- Seeds: 32

Events
Singles	men	women		boys	girls
Doubles	men	women	mixed	boys	girls
WC Singles	men	women	quad
WC Doubles	men	women	quad
Legends	men	women	mixed
- Australian Open

Novak Djokovic defeated Rafael Nadal in the final, 6–3, 6–2, 6–3 to win the men's singles tennis title at the 2019 Australian Open. It was his record seventh Australian Open title and 15th major title overall, surpassing Pete Sampras for third place on the all-time list. Djokovic became the first man to win three consecutive major finals in straight sets in the Open Era. Djokovic and Nadal were both in contention for the world No. 1 singles ranking; Djokovic retained the top ranking by reaching the fourth round. This was Nadal’s third attempt to become the first man in the Open Era to achieve a double career Grand Slam, a feat he would achieve three years later.

Roger Federer was the two-time defending champion, but lost in the fourth round to Stefanos Tsitsipas. Tsitsipas was the first Greek player to reach the semifinals at a singles major.

This was the first Australian Open since 1982 to feature a final set tie-break. Upon reaching 6–6 in the fifth set, a match tie-break is played where the winner is the first to reach ten points and lead by two points. The first men's singles main-draw match to feature the ten-point tiebreak was the first-round match between Jérémy Chardy and Ugo Humbert.

== Seeds ==
All seedings per ATP rankings.

1. (Serbia) Novak Djokovic (champion)
2. (Spain) Rafael Nadal (final)
3. (Switzerland) Roger Federer (fourth round)
4. (Germany) Alexander Zverev (fourth round)
5. (South Africa) Kevin Anderson (second round)
6. (Croatia) Marin Čilić (fourth round)
7. (Austria) Dominic Thiem (second round, retired)
8. (Japan) Kei Nishikori (quarterfinals, retired)
9. (United States) John Isner (first round)
10. (Russia) Karen Khachanov (third round)
11. (Croatia) Borna Ćorić (fourth round)
12. (Italy) Fabio Fognini (third round)
13. (United Kingdom) Kyle Edmund (first round)
14. (Greece) Stefanos Tsitsipas (semifinals)
15. (Russia) Daniil Medvedev (fourth round)
16. (Canada) Milos Raonic (quarterfinals)

17. (Italy) Marco Cecchinato (first round)
18. (Argentina) Diego Schwartzman (third round)
19. (Georgia (country)) Nikoloz Basilashvili (third round)
20. (Bulgaria) Grigor Dimitrov (fourth round)
21. (Belgium) David Goffin (third round)
22. (Spain) Roberto Bautista Agut (quarterfinals)
23. (Spain) Pablo Carreño Busta (fourth round)
24. (South Korea) Chung Hyeon (second round)
25. (Canada) Denis Shapovalov (third round)
26. (Spain) Fernando Verdasco (third round)
27. (Australia) Alex de Minaur (third round)
28. (France) Lucas Pouille (semifinals)
29. (France) Gilles Simon (second round)
30. (France) Gaël Monfils (second round)
31. (United States) Steve Johnson (first round)
32. (Germany) Philipp Kohlschreiber (second round)

Click on the seed number of a player to go to their draw section.

== Draw ==
Key

- Q = Qualifier
- WC = Wild card
- LL = Lucky loser
- Alt = Alternate
- ITF = ITF entry
- PR = Protected ranking
- SR = Special ranking
- SE = Special exempt
- JE = Junior exempt
- JR = Junior Accelerator Programme entrant
- CO = College Accelerator Programme entrant
- NG = Next Gen Accelerator Program entrant
- w/o = Walkover
- r = Retired
- d = Defaulted

=== Finals ===
Quarterfinals
1	(Serbia) Novak Djokovic	6	4
8	(Japan) Kei Nishikori	1	1^{r}
16	(Canada) Milos Raonic	6^{4}	3	7^{7}	4
28	(France) Lucas Pouille	7^{7}	6	6^{2}	6
22	(Spain) Roberto Bautista Agut	5	6	4	6^{2}
14	(Greece) Stefanos Tsitsipas	7	4	6	7^{7}
(United States) Frances Tiafoe	3	4	2
2	(Spain) Rafael Nadal	6	6	6

Semifinals
1	(Serbia) Novak Djokovic	6	6	6
28	(France) Lucas Pouille	0	2	2
14	(Greece) Stefanos Tsitsipas	2	4	0
2	(Spain) Rafael Nadal	6	6	6

Final
1	(Serbia) Novak Djokovic	6	6	6
2	(Spain) Rafael Nadal	3	2	3

=== Top half ===
==== Section 1 ====
First round
1	(Serbia) N Djokovic	6	6	6
Q	(United States) M Krueger	3	2	2
WC	(France) J-W Tsonga	6	6	7^{7}
(Slovakia) M Kližan	4	4	6^{5}
(Japan) T Daniel	5	4
Q	(Australia) T Kokkinakis	7	2^{r}
(Spain) P Andújar	2	3	6^{3}
25	(Canada) D Shapovalov	6	6	7^{7}
21	(Belgium) D Goffin	6	6	6
(Chile) C Garín	0	2	2
(Spain) M Granollers	3	4	4
(Romania) M Copil	6	6	6
(Czech Republic) J Veselý	0	5	3
(United States) R Harrison	6	7	6
Q	(South Africa) L Harris	1	2	1
15	(Russia) D Medvedev	6	6	6

Second round
1	(Serbia) N Djokovic	6	7	6
WC	(France) J-W Tsonga	3	5	4
(Japan) T Daniel	3	6^{2}	3
25	(Canada) D Shapovalov	6	7^{7}	6
21	(Belgium) D Goffin	5	7	6	6
(Romania) M Copil	7	5	2	4
(United States) R Harrison	3	3	3
15	(Russia) D Medvedev	6	6	6

Third round
1	(Serbia) N Djokovic	6	6	4	6
25	(Canada) D Shapovalov	3	4	6	0
21	(Belgium) D Goffin	2	6^{3}	3
15	(Russia) D Medvedev	6	7^{7}	6

Fourth round
1	(Serbia) N Djokovic	6	6^{5}	6	6
15	(Russia) D Medvedev	4	7^{7}	2	3

==== Section 2 ====
First round
12	(Italy) F Fognini	7^{7}	7^{9}	3
(Spain) J Munar	6^{3}	6^{7}	1^{r}
(Chile) N Jarry	6^{4}	6^{3}	6	3
(Argentina) L Mayer	7^{7}	7^{7}	4	6
(Belarus) I Ivashka	4	7^{8}	6	4
(Tunisia) M Jaziri	6	6^{6}	1	0^{r}
Q	(Italy) L Vanni	7^{7}	6	3	5	4
23	(Spain) P Carreño Busta	6^{5}	2	6	7	6
32	(Germany) P Kohlschreiber	6	6	6
WC	(China) Z Li	2	2	4
(Argentina) G Pella	6^{2}	6	6^{5}	6	2
(Portugal) J Sousa	7^{7}	4	7^{7}	4	6
(Croatia) I Karlović	6^{5}	7^{7}	7^{7}	7^{7}
(Poland) H Hurkacz	7^{7}	6^{5}	6^{3}	6^{5}
Q	(Poland) K Majchrzak	6	7^{8}	0	2	0^{r}
8	(Japan) K Nishikori	3	6^{6}	6	6	3

Second round
12	(Italy) F Fognini	7^{7}	6	7^{7}
(Argentina) L Mayer	6^{3}	3	6^{5}
(Belarus) I Ivashka	2	3	6^{7}
23	(Spain) P Carreño Busta	6	6	7^{9}
32	(Germany) P Kohlschreiber	5	6	6^{4}	7	4
(Portugal) J Sousa	7	4	7^{7}	5	6
(Croatia) I Karlović	3	6^{6}	7	7	6^{7}
8	(Japan) K Nishikori	6	7^{8}	5	5	7^{10}

Third round
12	(Italy) F Fognini	2	4	6	4
23	(Spain) P Carreño Busta	6	6	2	6
(Portugal) J Sousa	6^{6}	1	2
8	(Japan) K Nishikori	7^{8}	6	6

Fourth round
23	(Spain) P Carreño Busta	7^{10}	6	6^{4}	4	6^{8}
8	(Japan) K Nishikori	6^{8}	4	7^{7}	6	7^{10}

==== Section 3 ====
First round
4	(Germany) A Zverev	6	6	6
(Slovenia) A Bedene	4	1	4
(France) J Chardy	3	7^{8}	6	6^{4}	7^{10}
(France) U Humbert	6	6^{6}	4	7^{7}	6^{6}
WC	(Australia) A Bolt	4	6	6	6
WC	(United States) J Sock	6	3	2	2
Q	(United States) B Fratangelo	6^{2}	4	2
29	(France) G Simon	7^{7}	6	6
24	(South Korea) H Chung	6^{5}	6^{5}	6	6	6
(United States) B Klahn	7^{7}	7^{7}	3	2	4
(United States) S Querrey	7	6^{6}	3	1
(France) P-H Herbert	5	7^{8}	6	6
(Switzerland) S Wawrinka	3	3
(Latvia) E Gulbis	6	1^{r}
(Australia) N Kyrgios	4	6^{5}	4
16	(Canada) M Raonic	6	7^{7}	6

Second round
4	(Germany) A Zverev	7^{7}	6	5	6^{6}	6
(France) J Chardy	6^{5}	4	7	7^{8}	1
WC	(Australia) A Bolt	2	6	4	7^{10}	6
29	(France) G Simon	6	4	6	6^{8}	4
24	(South Korea) H Chung	2	6	2	4
(France) P-H Herbert	6	1	6	6
(Switzerland) S Wawrinka	7^{7}	6^{6}	6^{11}	6^{5}
16	(Canada) M Raonic	6^{4}	7^{8}	7^{13}	7^{7}

Third round
4	(Germany) A Zverev	6	6	6
WC	(Australia) A Bolt	3	3	2
(France) P-H Herbert	4	4	6^{6}
16	(Canada) M Raonic	6	6	7^{8}

Fourth round
4	(Germany) A Zverev	1	1	6^{5}
16	(Canada) M Raonic	6	6	7^{7}

==== Section 4 ====
First round
11	(Croatia) B Ćorić	6	6	6
PR	(Belgium) S Darcis	1	4	4
(Spain) A Ramos Viñolas	3	4	7^{7}	3
(Hungary) M Fucsovics	6	6	6^{5}	6
(Serbia) L Đere	7^{7}	4	1	6^{5}
(Russia) E Donskoy	6^{5}	6	6	7^{7}
(Serbia) F Krajinović	4	0	6	7^{10}	6
17	(Italy) M Cecchinato	6	6	1	6^{8}	4
28	(France) L Pouille	6	7	6
(Kazakhstan) M Kukushkin	1	5	4
(Germany) M Marterer	6	6	6
Q	(France) G Sakharov	3	1	3
WC	(Australia) A Popyrin	7	7^{9}	6
(Germany) M Zverev	5	6^{7}	4
(France) B Paire	4	3	7	6	3
7	(Austria) D Thiem	6	6	5	1	6

Second round
11	(Croatia) B Ćorić	6	6	6
(Hungary) M Fucsovics	4	3	4
(Russia) E Donskoy	4	6^{8}	6^{2}
(Serbia) F Krajinović	6	7^{10}	7^{7}
28	(France) L Pouille	7^{10}	7^{10}	5	6
(Germany) M Marterer	6^{8}	6^{8}	7	4
WC	(Australia) A Popyrin	7	6	2
7	(Austria) D Thiem	5	4	0^{r}

Third round
11	(Croatia) B Ćorić	2	6	6	6
(Serbia) F Krajinović	6	3	4	3
28	(France) L Pouille	7^{7}	6	6^{10}	4	6
WC	(Australia) A Popyrin	6^{3}	3	7^{12}	6	3

Fourth round
11	(Croatia) B Ćorić	7^{7}	4	5	6^{2}
28	(France) L Pouille	6^{4}	6	7	7^{7}

=== Bottom half ===
==== Section 5 ====
First round
6	(Croatia) M Čilić	6	6	7^{7}
(Australia) B Tomic	2	4	6^{3}
(Russia) A Rublev	4	4	6	4
(United States) M McDonald	6	6	2	6
(United States) M Mmoh	6	3	4	2
(Moldova) R Albot	3	6	6	6
Q	(Serbia) M Kecmanović	6^{5}	3	3
26	(Spain) F Verdasco	7^{7}	6	6
22	(Spain) R Bautista Agut	6	6	6^{5}	6^{4}	6
PR	(United Kingdom) A Murray	4	4	7^{7}	7^{7}	2
(Argentina) F Delbonis	3	6	6^{3}	2
(Australia) J Millman	6	3	7^{7}	6
(Japan) Y Nishioka	6	7^{7}	4	6
(United States) T Sandgren	4	6^{5}	6	4
(Germany) P Gojowczyk	6	3	4	3
10	(Russia) K Khachanov	3	6	6	6

Second round
6	(Croatia) M Čilić	7	6^{9}	6	6
(United States) M McDonald	5	7^{11}	4	4
(Moldova) R Albot	1	6^{2}	3
26	(Spain) F Verdasco	6	7^{7}	6
22	(Spain) R Bautista Agut	6	6	3	6^{6}	6
(Australia) J Millman	3	1	6	7^{8}	4
(Japan) Y Nishioka	3	3	3
10	(Russia) K Khachanov	6	6	6

Third round
6	(Croatia) M Čilić	4	3	6	7^{10}	6
26	(Spain) F Verdasco	6	6	1	6^{8}	3
22	(Spain) R Bautista Agut	6	7	6
10	(Russia) K Khachanov	4	5	4

Fourth round
6	(Croatia) M Čilić	7^{8}	3	2	6	4
22	(Spain) R Bautista Agut	6^{6}	6	6	4	6

==== Section 6 ====
First round
14	(Greece) S Tsitsipas	6^{3}	6	6	7^{7}
(Italy) M Berrettini	7^{7}	4	3	6^{4}
Q	(Serbia) V Troicki	6	1	2	6	6
(Spain) R Carballés Baena	1	6	6	1	4
Q	(Italy) S Travaglia	6^{3}	6	6	6
(Argentina) G Andreozzi	7^{7}	2	3	2
Q	(United States) C Eubanks	4	6	6^{6}	3
19	(Georgia (country)) N Basilashvili	6	4	7^{8}	6
30	(France) G Monfils	6	6	6
(Bosnia and Herzegovina) D Džumhur	0	4	0
(United Kingdom) C Norrie	3	6^{6}	2
(United States) T Fritz	6	7^{8}	6
Q	(Japan) T Ito	5	1	6^{8}
Q	(United Kingdom) D Evans	7	6	7^{10}
(Uzbekistan) D Istomin	3	4	4
3	(Switzerland) R Federer	6	6	6

Second round
14	(Greece) S Tsitsipas	6	2	6	7
Q	(Serbia) V Troicki	3	6	2	5
Q	(Italy) S Travaglia	6	3	6	4	3
19	(Georgia (country)) N Basilashvili	3	6	3	6	6
30	(France) G Monfils	3	7^{10}	6^{6}	6^{5}
(United States) T Fritz	6	6^{8}	7^{8}	7^{7}
Q	(United Kingdom) D Evans	6^{5}	6^{3}	3
3	(Switzerland) R Federer	7^{7}	7^{7}	6

Third round
14	(Greece) S Tsitsipas	6	3	7^{9}	6
19	(Georgia (country)) N Basilashvili	3	6	6^{7}	4
(United States) T Fritz	2	5	2
3	(Switzerland) R Federer	6	7	6

Fourth round
14	(Greece) S Tsitsipas	6^{11}	7^{7}	7	7^{7}
3	(Switzerland) R Federer	7^{13}	6^{3}	5	6^{5}

==== Section 7 ====
First round
5	(South Africa) K Anderson	6	5	6	6
(France) A Mannarino	3	7	2	1
(United States) F Tiafoe	7^{9}	6	6
Q	(India) P Gunneswaran	6^{7}	3	3
(Spain) F López	1	6^{0}	3
(Australia) J Thompson	6	7^{7}	6
(Italy) A Seppi	6	4	6	6
31	(United States) S Johnson	4	6	4	3
20	(Bulgaria) G Dimitrov	4	6	6	6
PR	(Serbia) J Tipsarević	6	3	1	4
(Uruguay) P Cuevas	6	7	6
(Serbia) D Lajović	4	5	1
WC	(Australia) J Kubler	4	6^{1}	6	3
(Italy) T Fabbiano	6	7^{7}	2	6
(United States) R Opelka	7^{7}	7^{8}	6^{4}	7^{7}
9	(United States) J Isner	6^{4}	6^{6}	7^{7}	6^{5}

Second round
5	(South Africa) K Anderson	6	4	4	5
(United States) F Tiafoe	4	6	6	7
(Australia) J Thompson	3	4	4
(Italy) A Seppi	6	6	6
20	(Bulgaria) G Dimitrov	6	6^{5}	6	7
(Uruguay) P Cuevas	3	7^{7}	3	5
(Italy) T Fabbiano	6^{15}	6	6	3	7^{10}
(United States) R Opelka	7^{17}	2	4	6	6^{5}

Third round
(United States) F Tiafoe	6^{3}	6	4	6	6
(Italy) A Seppi	7^{7}	3	6	4	3
20	(Bulgaria) G Dimitrov	7^{7}	6	6
(Italy) T Fabbiano	6^{5}	4	4

Fourth round
(United States) F Tiafoe	7	7^{8}	6^{1}	7
20	(Bulgaria) G Dimitrov	5	6^{6}	7^{7}	5

==== Section 8 ====
First round
13	(United Kingdom) K Edmund	3	0	5
(Czech Republic) T Berdych	6	6	7
(Spain) G García López	5	4	5
(Netherlands) R Haase	7	6	7
WC	(Australia) M Polmans	7	6	2	3	2
(United States) D Kudla	5	1	6	6	6
Q	(Germany) R Molleker	1	3	6	0
18	(Argentina) D Schwartzman	6	6	4	6
27	(Australia) A de Minaur	6	7	6
(Portugal) P Sousa	4	5	4
(Bosnia and Herzegovina) M Bašić	4	6^{4}	6	3
Q	(Switzerland) H Laaksonen	6	7^{7}	4	6
(Australia) M Ebden	1	6	6	6
(Germany) J-L Struff	6	4	3	4
WC	(Australia) J Duckworth	4	3	5
2	(Spain) R Nadal	6	6	7

Second round
(Czech Republic) T Berdych	6	6	6
(Netherlands) R Haase	1	3	3
(United States) D Kudla	4	5	6	7^{8}	4
18	(Argentina) D Schwartzman	6	7	3	6^{6}	6
27	(Australia) A de Minaur	6	6	6^{7}	4	6
Q	(Switzerland) H Laaksonen	4	2	7^{9}	6	3
(Australia) M Ebden	3	2	2
2	(Spain) R Nadal	6	6	6

Third round
(Czech Republic) T Berdych	5	6	7	6
18	(Argentina) D Schwartzman	7	3	5	4
27	(Australia) A de Minaur	1	2	4
2	(Spain) R Nadal	6	6	6

Fourth round
(Czech Republic) T Berdych	0	1	6^{4}
2	(Spain) R Nadal	6	6	7^{7}

== Championship match ratings ==
554 thousand on ESPN, in the USA

Preceded by 2018 US Open – Men's singles	Grand Slam men's singles	Succeeded by 2019 French Open – Men's singles
