= 2019 Australian Open – Women's singles =

Women's singles
- 2019 Australian Open

Final
- Champion: (Japan) Naomi Osaka
- Runner-up: (Czech Republic) Petra Kvitová
- Score: 7–6^{(7–2)}, 5–7, 6–4

Details
- Draw: 128 (16Q / 8WC)
- Seeds: 32

Events
Singles	men	women		boys	girls
Doubles	men	women	mixed	boys	girls
WC Singles	men	women	quad
WC Doubles	men	women	quad
Legends	men	women	mixed
- Australian Open

Naomi Osaka defeated Petra Kvitová in the final, 7–6^{(7–2)}, 5–7, 6–4 to win the women's singles tennis title at the 2019 Australian Open. It was her first Australian Open title and second major title overall. With the win, Osaka became the world No. 1, and the first player since Jennifer Capriati to win their first two major titles at consecutive events. Eleven players were in contention for the world No. 1 ranking: Kvitová, Osaka, reigning world No. 1 Simona Halep, reigning champion Caroline Wozniacki, Sloane Stephens, Karolína Plíšková, Angelique Kerber, Elina Svitolina, Kiki Bertens, Aryna Sabalenka and Daria Kasatkina.

Caroline Wozniacki was the defending champion, but lost in the third round to Maria Sharapova.

This was the first Australian Open to feature a final-set tiebreak. When the score in a final set reached 6–6, the first player to reach 10 points and lead by at least 2 points won the set (and the match). Katie Boulter and Ekaterina Makarova became the first players to contest this tiebreak in the main draw, with Boulter emerging victorious.

This tournament marked the major main-draw debut of future world No. 1 and six-time major champion Iga Świątek; she lost to Camila Giorgi in the second round. Amanda Anisimova became the first player born in the 21st century to reach the fourth round of a singles major. Ashleigh Barty was the first Australian to reach the quarterfinals since Jelena Dokic in 2009.

For the first time since 2009 Wimbledon, all of the top eight seeds reached the third round at a women's singles major.

== Seeds ==
Seeding per WTA rankings.

1. (Romania) Simona Halep (fourth round)
2. (Germany) Angelique Kerber (fourth round)
3. (Denmark) Caroline Wozniacki (third round)
4. (Japan) Naomi Osaka (champion)
5. (United States) Sloane Stephens (fourth round)
6. (Ukraine) Elina Svitolina (quarterfinals)
7. (Czech Republic) Karolína Plíšková (semifinals)
8. (Czech Republic) Petra Kvitová (final)
9. (Netherlands) Kiki Bertens (second round)
10. (Russia) Daria Kasatkina (first round)
11. (Belarus) Aryna Sabalenka (third round)
12. (Belgium) Elise Mertens (third round)
13. (Latvia) Anastasija Sevastova (fourth round)
14. (Germany) Julia Görges (first round)
15. (Australia) Ashleigh Barty (quarterfinals)
16. (United States) Serena Williams (quarterfinals)

17. (United States) Madison Keys (fourth round)
18. (Spain) Garbiñe Muguruza (fourth round)
19. (France) Caroline Garcia (third round)
20. (Estonia) Anett Kontaveit (second round)
21. (China) Wang Qiang (third round)
22. (Latvia) Jeļena Ostapenko (first round)
23. (Spain) Carla Suárez Navarro (second round)
24. (Ukraine) Lesia Tsurenko (second round)
25. (Romania) Mihaela Buzărnescu (first round)
26. (Slovakia) Dominika Cibulková (first round)
27. (Italy) Camila Giorgi (third round)
28. (Chinese Taipei) Hsieh Su-wei (third round)
29. (Croatia) Donna Vekić (second round)
30. (Russia) Maria Sharapova (fourth round)
31. (Croatia) Petra Martić (third round)
32. (Czech Republic) Barbora Strýcová (first round)

Click on the seed number of a player to go to their draw section.

== Draw ==
Key

- Q = Qualifier
- WC = Wild card
- LL = Lucky loser
- Alt = Alternate
- ITF = ITF entry
- PR = Protected ranking
- SR = Special ranking
- SE = Special exempt
- JE = Junior exempt
- JR = Junior Accelerator Programme entrant
- CO = College Accelerator Programme entrant
- NG = Next Gen Accelerator Program entrant
- w/o = Walkover
- r = Retired
- d = Defaulted

=== Finals ===
Quarterfinals
16	(United States) Serena Williams	4	6	5
7	(Czech Republic) Karolína Plíšková	6	4	7
4	(Japan) Naomi Osaka	6	6
6	(Ukraine) Elina Svitolina	4	1
8	(Czech Republic) Petra Kvitová	6	6
15	(Australia) Ashleigh Barty	1	4
(Russia) Anastasia Pavlyuchenkova	6	5	1
(United States) Danielle Collins	2	7	6

Semifinals
7	(Czech Republic) Karolína Plíšková	2	6	4
4	(Japan) Naomi Osaka	6	4	6
8	(Czech Republic) Petra Kvitová	7^{7}	6
(United States) Danielle Collins	6^{2}	0

Final
4	(Japan) Naomi Osaka	7^{7}	5	6
8	(Czech Republic) Petra Kvitová	6^{2}	7	4

=== Top half ===
==== Section 1 ====
First round
1	(Romania) S Halep	6^{2}	6	6
(Estonia) K Kanepi	7^{7}	4	2
(United States) S Kenin	6	3	7
Q	(Russia) V Kudermetova	3	6	5
(France) A Cornet	6	6
(Spain) L Arruabarrena	2	2
(United States) V Williams	6^{3}	7^{7}	6
25	(Romania) M Buzărnescu	7^{7}	6^{3}	2
23	(Spain) C Suárez Navarro	7	6
WC	(France) C Burel	5	2
(Australia) S Stosur	5	2
(Ukraine) D Yastremska	7	6
(Canada) E Bouchard	6	6
WC	(China) S Peng	2	1
(Germany) T Maria	0	2
16	(United States) S Williams	6	6

Second round
1	(Romania) S Halep	6	6^{5}	6
(United States) S Kenin	3	7^{7}	4
(France) A Cornet	3	6	0
(United States) V Williams	6	4	6
23	(Spain) C Suárez Navarro	3	6	1
(Ukraine) D Yastremska	6	3	6
(Canada) E Bouchard	2	2
16	(United States) S Williams	6	6

Third round
1	(Romania) S Halep	6	6
(United States) V Williams	2	3
(Ukraine) D Yastremska	2	1
16	(United States) S Williams	6	6

Fourth round
1	(Romania) S Halep	1	6	4
16	(United States) S Williams	6	4	6

==== Section 2 ====
First round
10	(Russia) D Kasatkina	3	0
PR	(Switzerland) T Bacsinszky	6	6
Q	(Russia) N Vikhlyantseva	6^{2}	6	6
Q	(United States) V Lepchenko	7^{7}	2	4
(United Kingdom) J Konta	7^{7}	2	7^{10}
(Australia) A Tomljanović	6^{4}	6	6^{7}
(China) S Zheng	2	3
18	(Spain) G Muguruza	6	6
27	(Italy) C Giorgi	6	6
(Slovenia) D Jakupović	3	0
Q	(Poland) I Świątek	6	3	6
(Romania) A Bogdan	3	6	4
(United States) M Brengle	6	6
Q	(Japan) M Doi	4	0
Q	(Czech Republic) K Muchová	3	2
7	(Czech Republic) Ka Plíšková	6	6

Second round
PR	(Switzerland) T Bacsinszky	6	7
Q	(Russia) N Vikhlyantseva	2	5
(United Kingdom) J Konta	4	7^{7}	5
18	(Spain) G Muguruza	6	6^{3}	7
27	(Italy) C Giorgi	6	6
Q	(Poland) I Świątek	2	0
(United States) M Brengle	6	1	0
7	(Czech Republic) Ka Plíšková	4	6	6

Third round
PR	(Switzerland) T Bacsinszky	6^{5}	2
18	(Spain) G Muguruza	7^{7}	6
27	(Italy) C Giorgi	4	6	2
7	(Czech Republic) Ka Plíšková	6	3	6

Fourth round
18	(Spain) G Muguruza	3	1
7	(Czech Republic) Ka Plíšková	6	6

==== Section 3 ====
First round
4	(Japan) N Osaka	6	6
(Poland) M Linette	4	2
(Slovenia) T Zidanšek	7	6
(Australia) D Gavrilova	5	3
PR	(Germany) L Siegemund	6^{5}	6	6
(Belarus) V Azarenka	7^{7}	4	2
(Switzerland) S Vögele	2	1
28	(Chinese Taipei) S-w Hsieh	6	6
21	(China) Q Wang	6	6
(France) F Ferro	4	3
(Kazakhstan) Z Diyas	6	5	1
(Serbia) A Krunić	3	7	6
Q	(Canada) B Andreescu	7^{7}	6^{0}	6
WC	(United States) W Osuigwe	6^{1}	7^{7}	3
(Germany) M Barthel	3	1
13	(Latvia) A Sevastova	6	6

Second round
4	(Japan) N Osaka	6	6
(Slovenia) T Zidanšek	2	4
PR	(Germany) L Siegemund	3	4
28	(Chinese Taipei) S-w Hsieh	6	6
21	(China) Q Wang	6	6
(Serbia) A Krunić	2	3
Q	(Canada) B Andreescu	3	6	2
13	(Latvia) A Sevastova	6	3	6

Third round
4	(Japan) N Osaka	5	6	6
28	(Chinese Taipei) S-w Hsieh	7	4	1
21	(China) Q Wang	3	3
13	(Latvia) A Sevastova	6	6

Fourth round
4	(Japan) N Osaka	4	6	6
13	(Latvia) A Sevastova	6	3	4

==== Section 4 ====
First round
12	(Belgium) E Mertens	6	7
(Slovakia) AK Schmiedlová	2	5
Q	(China) L Zhu	6	2	2
(Russia) M Gasparyan	4	6	6
(France) P Parmentier	4	6^{5}
(Russia) A Potapova	6	7^{7}
WC	(Australia) D Aiava	2	2
17	(United States) M Keys	6	6
26	(Slovakia) D Cibulková	2	6	2
(China) S Zhang	6	4	6
(Czech Republic) Kr Plíšková	7^{7}	2	6
(Russia) A Blinkova	6^{2}	6	2
(Slovakia) V Kužmová	4	6	6
(Ukraine) K Kozlova	6	4	2
Q	(Switzerland) V Golubic	1	2
6	(Ukraine) E Svitolina	6	6

Second round
12	(Belgium) E Mertens	6	7
(Russia) M Gasparyan	1	5
(Russia) A Potapova	3	4
17	(United States) M Keys	6	6
(China) S Zhang	6	7
(Czech Republic) Kr Plíšková	3	5
(Slovakia) V Kužmová	4	1
6	(Ukraine) E Svitolina	6	6

Third round
12	(Belgium) E Mertens	3	2
17	(United States) M Keys	6	6
(China) S Zhang	6	4	5
6	(Ukraine) E Svitolina	4	6	7

Fourth round
17	(United States) M Keys	2	6	1
6	(Ukraine) E Svitolina	6	1	6

=== Bottom half ===
==== Section 5 ====
First round
8	(Czech Republic) P Kvitová	6	6
(Slovakia) M Rybáriková	3	2
(Romania) I-C Begu	6^{3}	4
(Germany) A Petkovic	7^{7}	3^{r}
(Switzerland) B Bencic	6	2	6
(Czech Republic) K Siniaková	4	6	3
(Kazakhstan) Y Putintseva	6	7^{7}
32	(Czech Republic) B Strýcová	4	6^{1}
24	(Ukraine) L Tsurenko	6	7^{7}
(Russia) E Alexandrova	4	6^{4}
(Romania) M Niculescu	6^{3}	4
(United States) A Anisimova	7^{7}	6
(United Kingdom) K Boulter	6	4	7^{10}
(Russia) E Makarova	0	6	6^{6}
Q	(Russia) A Kalinskaya	1	4
11	(Belarus) A Sabalenka	6	6

Second round
8	(Czech Republic) P Kvitová	6	6
(Romania) I-C Begu	1	3
(Switzerland) B Bencic	7	4	6
(Kazakhstan) Y Putintseva	5	6	2
24	(Ukraine) L Tsurenko	0	2
(United States) A Anisimova	6	6
(United Kingdom) K Boulter	3	4
11	(Belarus) A Sabalenka	6	6

Third round
8	(Czech Republic) P Kvitová	6	6
(Switzerland) B Bencic	1	4
(United States) A Anisimova	6	6
11	(Belarus) A Sabalenka	3	2

Fourth round
8	(Czech Republic) P Kvitová	6	6
(United States) A Anisimova	2	1

==== Section 6 ====
First round
15	(Australia) A Barty	6	6
(Thailand) L Kumkhum	2	2
WC	(Australia) E Perez	4	0
(China) Y Wang	6	6
Q	(Australia) A Sharma	7	4	6
WC	(Australia) P Hon	5	6	1
(Greece) M Sakkari	6	3	6
22	(Latvia) J Ostapenko	1	6	2
30	(Russia) M Sharapova	6	6
Q	(United Kingdom) H Dart	0	0
(Romania) S Cîrstea	4	1
(Sweden) R Peterson	6	6
(Belarus) V Lapko	6^{5}	0^{r}
(Sweden) J Larsson	7^{7}	3
(Belgium) A Van Uytvanck	3	4
3	(Denmark) C Wozniacki	6	6

Second round
15	(Australia) A Barty	6	6
(China) Y Wang	2	3
Q	(Australia) A Sharma	1	4
(Greece) M Sakkari	6	6
30	(Russia) M Sharapova	6	6
(Sweden) R Peterson	2	1
(Sweden) J Larsson	1	3
3	(Denmark) C Wozniacki	6	6

Third round
15	(Australia) A Barty	7	6
(Greece) M Sakkari	5	1
30	(Russia) M Sharapova	6	4	6
3	(Denmark) C Wozniacki	4	6	3

Fourth round
15	(Australia) A Barty	4	6	6
30	(Russia) M Sharapova	6	1	4

==== Section 7 ====
First round
5	(United States) S Stephens	6	6
(United States) T Townsend	4	2
(Tunisia) O Jabeur	6^{5}	6^{3}
(Hungary) T Babos	7^{7}	7^{7}
(Czech Republic) M Vondroušová	6	6
(Russia) E Rodina	3	2
(United Kingdom) H Watson	1	2
31	(Croatia) P Martić	6	6
20	(Estonia) A Kontaveit	6	6
(Spain) S Sorribes Tormo	3	2
(Belgium) K Flipkens	1	1
(Belarus) A Sasnovich	6	6
(Puerto Rico) M Puig	4	3
(Russia) A Pavlyuchenkova	6	6
(United States) A Riske	3	3
9	(Netherlands) K Bertens	6	6

Second round
5	(United States) S Stephens	6	6
(Hungary) T Babos	3	1
(Czech Republic) M Vondroušová	4	5
31	(Croatia) P Martić	6	7
20	(Estonia) A Kontaveit	3	3
(Belarus) A Sasnovich	6	6
(Russia) A Pavlyuchenkova	3	6	6
9	(Netherlands) K Bertens	6	3	3

Third round
5	(United States) S Stephens	7^{8}	7^{7}
31	(Croatia) P Martić	6^{6}	6^{5}
(Belarus) A Sasnovich	0	3
(Russia) A Pavlyuchenkova	6	6

Fourth round
5	(United States) S Stephens	7^{7}	3	3
(Russia) A Pavlyuchenkova	6^{3}	6	6

==== Section 8 ====
First round
14	(Germany) J Görges	6	6^{5}	4
(United States) D Collins	2	7^{7}	6
Q	(Belgium) Y Bonaventure	6	4	4
(United States) S Vickery	2	6	6
PR	(United States) B Mattek-Sands	1	2
WC	(Australia) Z Hives	6	6
Q	(France) J Ponchet	2	3
19	(France) C Garcia	6	6
29	(Croatia) D Vekić	6	6
(France) K Mladenovic	2	4
Q	(Spain) P Badosa Gibert	4	2
WC	(Australia) K Birrell	6	6
Q	(Brazil) B Haddad Maia	6	5	6
(United States) B Pera	3	7	4
(Slovenia) P Hercog	2	2
2	(Germany) A Kerber	6	6

Second round
(United States) D Collins	6	7
(United States) S Vickery	3	5
WC	(Australia) Z Hives	3	3
19	(France) C Garcia	6	6
29	(Croatia) D Vekić	4	6	1
WC	(Australia) K Birrell	6	4	6
Q	(Brazil) B Haddad Maia	2	3
2	(Germany) A Kerber	6	6

Third round
(United States) D Collins	6	6
19	(France) C Garcia	3	2
WC	(Australia) K Birrell	1	0
2	(Germany) A Kerber	6	6

Fourth round
(United States) D Collins	6	6
2	(Germany) A Kerber	0	2

== Championship match statistics ==
Category	(Japan) Osaka	(Czech Republic) Kvitová
1st serve %	68/110 (62%)	75/118 (64%)
1st serve points won	52 of 68 = 76%	53 of 75 = 71%
2nd serve points won	19 of 42 = 45%	20 of 43 = 47%
Total service points won	71 of 110 = 65.55%	73 of 118 = 61.86%
Aces	9	5
Double faults	4	4
Winners	33	33
Unforced errors	33	39
Net points won	0 of 3 = 0%	10 of 12 = 83%
Break points converted	3 of 14 = 21%	3 of 10 = 30%
Return points won	45 of 118 = 38%	39 of 110 = 35%
Total points won	116	112

Preceded by 2018 US Open – Women's singles	Grand Slam women's singles	Succeeded by 2019 French Open – Women's singles
