= 2019 Australian Open – Men's doubles =

Tennis tournament

Men's doubles
- 2019 Australian Open

Final
- Champions: (France) Pierre-Hugues Herbert (France) Nicolas Mahut
- Runners-up: (Finland) Henri Kontinen (Australia) John Peers
- Score: 6–4, 7–6^{(7–1)}

Details
- Draw: 64
- Seeds: 16

Events
Singles	men	women		boys	girls
Doubles	men	women	mixed	boys	girls
WC Singles	men	women	quad
WC Doubles	men	women	quad
Legends	men	women	mixed
- Australian Open

Pierre-Hugues Herbert and Nicolas Mahut won the men's doubles tennis title at the 2019 Australian Open, defeating Henri Kontinen and John Peers in the final, 6–4, 7–6^{(7–1)}. They are the first French players to achieve the Career Grand Slam as well as only the 8th Men's Doubles pair to achieve this feat.

Oliver Marach and Mate Pavić were the defending champions, but lost to Máximo González and Nicolás Jarry in the second round.

== Seeds ==
1. (Austria) Oliver Marach / (Croatia) Mate Pavić (second round)
2. (Colombia) Juan Sebastián Cabal / (Colombia) Robert Farah (first round)
3. (United Kingdom) Jamie Murray / (Brazil) Bruno Soares (quarterfinals)
4. (United States) Bob Bryan / (United States) Mike Bryan (quarterfinals)
5. (France) Pierre-Hugues Herbert / (France) Nicolas Mahut (champions)
6. (South Africa) Raven Klaasen / (New Zealand) Michael Venus (quarterfinals)
7. (Poland) Łukasz Kubot / (Argentina) Horacio Zeballos (quarterfinals)
8. (Japan) Ben McLachlan / (Germany) Jan-Lennard Struff (first round)

9. (Netherlands) Jean-Julien Rojer / (Romania) Horia Tecău (first round)
10. (United Kingdom) Dominic Inglot / (Croatia) Franko Škugor (second round)
11. (United States) Rajeev Ram / (United Kingdom) Joe Salisbury (third round)
12. (Finland) Henri Kontinen / (Australia) John Peers (final)
13. (Croatia) Ivan Dodig / (France) Édouard Roger-Vasselin (second round)
14. (Spain) Feliciano López / (Spain) Marc López (first round)
15. (India) Rohan Bopanna / (India) Divij Sharan (first round)
16. (Netherlands) Robin Haase / (Netherlands) Matwé Middelkoop (first round)

Click on the seed number of a player to go to their draw section.

== Draw ==
Key

- Q = Qualifier
- WC = Wild card
- LL = Lucky loser
- Alt = Alternate
- ITF = ITF entry
- PR = Protected ranking
- SR = Special ranking
- SE = Special exempt
- JE = Junior exempt
- JR = Junior Accelerator Programme entrant
- CO = College Accelerator Programme entrant
- NG = Next Gen Accelerator Program entrant
- w/o = Walkover
- r = Retired
- d = Defaulted

=== Finals ===
Quarterfinals
(Argentina) Leonardo Mayer (Portugal) João Sousa	6	7^{8}
6	(South Africa) Raven Klaasen (New Zealand) Michael Venus	4	6^{6}
3	(United Kingdom) Jamie Murray (Brazil) Bruno Soares	3	4
12	(Finland) Henri Kontinen (Australia) John Peers	6	6
5	(France) Pierre-Hugues Herbert (France) Nicolas Mahut	6	7^{7}
4	(United States) Bob Bryan (United States) Mike Bryan	4	6^{3}
7	(Poland) Łukasz Kubot (Argentina) Horacio Zeballos	6	6^{5}	4
(United States) Ryan Harrison (United States) Sam Querrey	3	7^{7}	6

Semifinals
(Argentina) Leonardo Mayer (Portugal) João Sousa	1	6^{6}
12	(Finland) Henri Kontinen (Australia) John Peers	6	7^{8}
5	(France) Pierre-Hugues Herbert (France) Nicolas Mahut	6	6
(United States) Ryan Harrison (United States) Sam Querrey	4	2

Final
12	(Finland) Henri Kontinen (Australia) John Peers	4	6^{1}
5	(France) Pierre-Hugues Herbert (France) Nicolas Mahut	6	7^{7}

=== Top half ===
==== Section 1 ====
First round
1	(Austria) O Marach (Croatia) M Pavić	7	6^{7}	6
(Italy) S Bolelli (Italy) A Seppi	5	7^{9}	0
WC	(Australia) M Purcell (Australia) L Saville	6	4	3
(Argentina) M González (Chile) N Jarry	3	6	6
Alt	(Spain) R Carballés Baena (Russia) A Rublev	6	7^{7}
(France) H Nys (France) B Paire	2	6^{2}
(Argentina) L Mayer (Portugal) J Sousa	6	6^{1}	6
14	(Spain) F López (Spain) M López	4	7^{7}	3
10	(United Kingdom) D Inglot (Croatia) F Škugor	7	6
(Japan) T Daniel (Australia) J Millman	5	3
(Brazil) M Demoliner (Denmark) F Nielsen	4	6	6
(Spain) G Granollers (Spain) M Granollers	6	4	2
WC	(Australia) L Hewitt (Australia) J-P Smith	6	1	4
(New Zealand) M Daniell (Netherlands) W Koolhof	3	6	6
(United States) B Klahn (Kazakhstan) M Kukushkin	6	4	3
6	(South Africa) R Klaasen (New Zealand) M Venus	4	6	6

Second round
1	(Austria) O Marach (Croatia) M Pavić	4	4
(Argentina) M González (Chile) N Jarry	6	6
Alt	(Spain) R Carballés Baena (Russia) A Rublev	6^{5}	3
(Argentina) L Mayer (Portugal) J Sousa	7^{7}	6
10	(United Kingdom) D Inglot (Croatia) F Škugor	3	2
(Brazil) M Demoliner (Denmark) F Nielsen	6	6
(New Zealand) M Daniell (Netherlands) W Koolhof	6^{4}	3
6	(South Africa) R Klaasen (New Zealand) M Venus	7^{7}	6

Third round
(Argentina) M González (Chile) N Jarry	3	4
(Argentina) L Mayer (Portugal) J Sousa	6	6
(Brazil) M Demoliner (Denmark) F Nielsen	3	1
6	(South Africa) R Klaasen (New Zealand) M Venus	6	6

Quarterfinals
(Argentina) L Mayer (Portugal) J Sousa	6	7^{8}
6	(South Africa) R Klaasen (New Zealand) M Venus	4	6^{6}

==== Section 2 ====
First round
3	(United Kingdom) J Murray (Brazil) B Soares	6	7^{13}
(Czech Republic) R Jebavý (Argentina) A Molteni	4	6^{11}
(United Kingdom) L Bambridge (United Kingdom) J O'Mara	6	6
(Romania) M Copil (Hungary) M Fucsovics	3	1
(Germany) K Krawietz (Croatia) N Mektić	4	7^{10}	7
(United States) N Monroe (India) J Nedunchezhiyan	6	6^{8}	5
WC	(Australia) N Kyrgios (Australia) M Reid	2	6^{2}
13	(Croatia) I Dodig (France) É Roger-Vasselin	6	7^{7}
12	(Finland) H Kontinen (Australia) J Peers	6	4
(Mexico) S González (Pakistan) A-u-H Qureshi	3	1^{r}
WC	(Australia) J Duckworth (Australia) J Thompson	3	4
(United Kingdom) K Skupski (United Kingdom) N Skupski	6	6
(Australia) M Ebden (Sweden) R Lindstedt	5	3
(United States) S Johnson (United States) D Kudla	7	6
(Moldova) R Albot (Tunisia) M Jaziri	6	3	7^{11}
8	(Japan) B McLachlan (Germany) J-L Struff	2	6	6^{9}

Second round
3	(United Kingdom) J Murray (Brazil) B Soares	3	6	7
(United Kingdom) L Bambridge (United Kingdom) J O'Mara	6	2	5
(Germany) K Krawietz (Croatia) N Mektić	6	7^{7}
13	(Croatia) I Dodig (France) É Roger-Vasselin	3	6^{5}
12	(Finland) H Kontinen (Australia) J Peers	6	6
(United Kingdom) K Skupski (United Kingdom) N Skupski	3	4
(United States) S Johnson (United States) D Kudla	6	2	4
(Moldova) R Albot (Tunisia) M Jaziri	1	6	6

Third round
3	(United Kingdom) J Murray (Brazil) B Soares	6^{3}	6	7
(Germany) K Krawietz (Croatia) N Mektić	7^{7}	2	5
12	(Finland) H Kontinen (Australia) J Peers	7^{7}	6
(Moldova) R Albot (Tunisia) M Jaziri	6^{5}	4

Quarterfinals
3	(United Kingdom) J Murray (Brazil) B Soares	3	4
12	(Finland) H Kontinen (Australia) J Peers	6	6

=== Bottom half ===
==== Section 3 ====
First round
5	(France) P-H Herbert (France) N Mahut	7^{7}	6
(Spain) D Marrero (Germany) M Zverev	6^{4}	3
(Ukraine) D Molchanov (Slovakia) I Zelenay	4	6	6
(Italy) M Berrettini (Italy) M Cecchinato	6	3	3
(Austria) P Oswald (Germany) T Pütz	3	4
(Uruguay) P Cuevas (Spain) F Verdasco	6	6
(Argentina) G Pella (Chile) H Podlipnik Castillo	0	4
11	(United States) R Ram (United Kingdom) J Salisbury	6	6
15	(India) R Bopanna (India) D Sharan	1	6	5
(Spain) P Carreño Busta (Spain) G García López	6	4	7
WC	(China) M Gong (China) Z Zhang	7	5	6
(Slovakia) M Kližan (Poland) M Matkowski	5	7	4
(Germany) P Gojowczyk (Spain) A Ramos Viñolas	4	4
(France) A Mannarino (Germany) A Mies	6	6
WC	(Australia) A Bolt (Australia) M Polmans	6^{4}	6^{1}
4	(United States) B Bryan (United States) M Bryan	7^{7}	7^{7}

Second round
5	(France) P-H Herbert (France) N Mahut	7	6^{5}	6
(Ukraine) D Molchanov (Slovakia) I Zelenay	5	7^{7}	4
(Uruguay) P Cuevas (Spain) F Verdasco	3	2
11	(United States) R Ram (United Kingdom) J Salisbury	6	6
(Spain) P Carreño Busta (Spain) G García López	6	4	6
WC	(China) M Gong (China) Z Zhang	3	6	4
(France) A Mannarino (Germany) A Mies	5	6	2
4	(United States) B Bryan (United States) M Bryan	7	4	6

Third round
5	(France) P-H Herbert (France) N Mahut	4	7^{7}	6
11	(United States) R Ram (United Kingdom) J Salisbury	6	6^{5}	4
(Spain) P Carreño Busta (Spain) G García López	3	6^{4}
4	(United States) B Bryan (United States) M Bryan	6	7^{7}

Quarterfinals
5	(France) P-H Herbert (France) N Mahut	6	7^{7}
4	(United States) B Bryan (United States) M Bryan	4	6^{3}

==== Section 4 ====
First round
7	(Poland) Ł Kubot (Argentina) H Zeballos	7	5	6
(Slovenia) A Bedene (Germany) M Marterer	5	7	3
(United States) M McDonald (United States) T Sandgren	4	4
(France) J Chardy (France) F Martin	6	6
(Argentina) G Durán (Argentina) D Schwartzman	6^{6}	4
WC	(Australia) B Ellis (Australia) A Popyrin	7^{8}	6
(El Salvador) M Arévalo (United States) J Cerretani	7	6^{2}	6
9	(Netherlands) J-J Rojer (Romania) H Tecău	5	7^{7}	3
16	(Netherlands) R Haase (Netherlands) M Middelkoop	5	6	3
(United States) R Harrison (United States) S Querrey	7	4	6
(United States) A Krajicek (New Zealand) A Sitak	7	7^{7}
(India) L Paes (Mexico) MÁ Reyes-Varela	5	6^{4}
(United States) T Fritz (United Kingdom) C Norrie	7^{9}	7
(Bosnia and Herzegovina) M Bašić (Bosnia and Herzegovina) D Džumhur	6^{7}	5
(United States) J Sock (United States) J Withrow	6^{6}	6	6
2	(Colombia) JS Cabal (Colombia) R Farah	7^{8}	3	4

Second round
7	(Poland) Ł Kubot (Argentina) H Zeballos	7	4	6
(France) J Chardy (France) F Martin	5	6	3
WC	(Australia) B Ellis (Australia) A Popyrin	2	7^{9}	6
(El Salvador) M Arévalo (United States) J Cerretani	6	6^{7}	4
(United States) R Harrison (United States) S Querrey	6	7^{7}
(United States) A Krajicek (New Zealand) A Sitak	4	6^{5}
(United States) T Fritz (United Kingdom) C Norrie	7^{8}	3	6^{8}
(United States) J Sock (United States) J Withrow	6^{6}	6	7^{10}

Third round
7	(Poland) Ł Kubot (Argentina) H Zeballos	6	7^{7}
WC	(Australia) B Ellis (Australia) A Popyrin	4	6^{4}
(United States) R Harrison (United States) S Querrey	4	6	7
(United States) J Sock (United States) J Withrow	6	3	5

Quarterfinals
7	(Poland) Ł Kubot (Argentina) H Zeballos	6	6^{5}	4
(United States) R Harrison (United States) S Querrey	3	7^{7}	6
