= Basketball at the 2019 European Youth Summer Olympic Festival =

- Venue: Sarhadchi Arena + European Azerbaijan School
- Dates: 22–27 July
- Competitors: 192 from 14 nations

Basketball competitions of the 2019 European Youth Summer Olympic Festival was held in Sarhadchi Arena and European Azerbaijan School from 22 to 27 July 2019.

== Medal summary ==
=== Medal table ===
| Rank | Nation | Gold | Silver | Bronze | Total |
|---|---|---|---|---|---|
| 1 | France (FRA) | 1 | 0 | 0 | 1 |
| 1 | Spain (ESP) | 1 | 0 | 0 | 1 |
| 3 | Hungary (HUN) | 0 | 1 | 0 | 1 |
| 3 | Turkey (TUR) | 0 | 1 | 0 | 1 |
| 5 | Russia (RUS) | 0 | 0 | 1 | 1 |
| 5 | Serbia (SRB) | 0 | 0 | 1 | 1 |
| Totals (6 entries) | | 2 | 2 | 2 | 6 |

=== Medalists ===
| Event | Gold | Silver | Bronze |
|---|---|---|---|
| Boys | Spain; Juan Núñez; Pablo Tamba; Iker Montero; Owen Aquino; Rubén Domínguez; Christian Hernández; Guillem Vázquez; Toni Naspler; Iñaki Ordóñez; Ian Granja; Pablo León; Michael Caicedo | Turkey; Bülent Hamza Çelik; Berkay Yılmaz; Batın Tuna; Acar Şen; Hasan Efe Uzun; Ömer Ege Peksarı; Yiğit Hamza Mestoğlu; Haktan Yavaş; Yunus Emre Hamatoğlu; Koralp Türk; Emre Can Akdümbek; Enes Doruk Tüzün | Serbia; Nikola Đurišić; Nikola Radovanović; Vuk Bošković; Ilija Milijašević; Stefan Stefanović; Nikola Jović; Marko Marković; Nikola Saranovic; Mihailo Petrović; Matija Belić; Filip Branković; Stefan Dabović |
| Girls | France; Elyah Kiavi; Leyla Kapinga; Inès Debroise; Louise Préneau; Hawa Komara; Leila Lacan; Maia Hirsch; Amina Traore; Oumou Diarisso; Clara Djoko; Sara Roumy; Sophie Sene | Hungary; Zsuzsanna Sitku; Kata Ferenczi; Liza Balogh; Virág Pfeiffer; Lara Habling; Rebeka Renczes; Melinda Miklós; Petra Kuncz; Lili Rakita; Lili Krasovec; Zsófia Telegdy; Terka Zsófia Dúl | Russia; Nadezhda Iazykova; Anastasiia Boldyreva; Sabrina Dovnar-Zapolskaia; Iana Elberg; Anastasiia Bocharova; Valeriia Iakovleva; Karina Komarova; Iana Pashkovskaia; Veronika Loginova; Anastasiia Odintcova; Kristina Savkovich; Mariia Andrushchenko |

== Participating nations ==
A total of 192 athletes from 14 nations competed in basketball at the 2019 European Youth Summer Olympic Festival:

- Azerbaijan (12)
- Belgium (12)
- Croatia (12)
- Czech Republic (12)
- France (24)
- Greece (12)
- Hungary (12)
- Italy (12)
- Lithuania (12)
- Poland (12)
- Russia (12)
- Serbia (12)
- Spain (12)
- Turkey (24)
