= Tennis at the 2019 European Youth Summer Olympic Festival =

- Venue: Baku Tennis Academy
- Dates: 21–27 July
- Competitors: 121 from 36 nations

Tennis at the 2019 European Youth Summer Olympic Festival was held at Baku Tennis Academy, Baku, Azerbaijan from 21 to 27 July 2019.

Tennis had doubles and singles events for men and women.

== Medalists ==
Event	Gold	Silver	Bronze
Boys' singles	Daniel Mérida; Spain	Vilius Gaubas; Lithuania	Niccolò Ciavarella; Italy
Boys' doubles	Czech Republic; Hynek Bartoň; Matthew Donald	Poland; Olaf Pieczkowski; Filip Pieczonka	Spain; Daniel Mérida; Pedro Ródenas
Girls' singles	Matilda Mutavdzic; Great Britain	Maria Sholokhova; Russia	Dominika Šalková; Czech Republic
Girls' doubles	Belarus; Evialina Laskevich; Maryia Stsetsevich	Russia; Ekaterina Maklakova; Maria Sholokhova	Czech Republic; Linda Klimovičová; Dominika Šalková

== Medal table ==
* Host nation (Azerbaijan)

Rank	Nation	Gold	Silver	Bronze	Total
1	Czech Republic (CZE)	1	0	2	3
2	Spain (ESP)	1	0	1	2
3	Belarus (BLR)	1	0	0	1
3	Great Britain (GBR)	1	0	0	1
5	Russia (RUS)	0	2	0	2
6	Lithuania (LTU)	0	1	0	1
6	Poland (POL)	0	1	0	1
8	Italy (ITA)	0	0	1	1
Totals (8 entries)		4	4	4	12

== Participating nations ==
A total of 121 athletes from 36 nations competed in tennis at the 2019 European Youth Summer Olympic Festival:

- Albania (2)
- Austria (4)
- Azerbaijan (4)
- Belarus (4)
- Belgium (4)
- Bosnia and Herzegovina (2)
- Bulgaria (4)
- Croatia (4)
- Cyprus (1)
- Czech Republic (4)
- Denmark (2)
- Estonia (4)
- France (4)
- Georgia (2)
- Germany (4)
- Great Britain (4)
- Greece (4)
- Hungary (4)
- Ireland (2)
- Israel (3)
- Italy (4)
- Kosovo (4)
- Latvia (2)
- Lithuania (4)
- Moldova (1)
- Poland (4)
- Portugal (4)
- Romania (4)
- Russia (4)
- Serbia (1)
- Slovakia (4)
- Slovenia (4)
- Spain (4)
- Sweden (4)
- Switzerland (3)
- Turkey (4)
