= Baku Tennis Academy =

Tennis Venue in Baku, Azerbaijan

Coordinates: 40.422497°N 49.842438°E

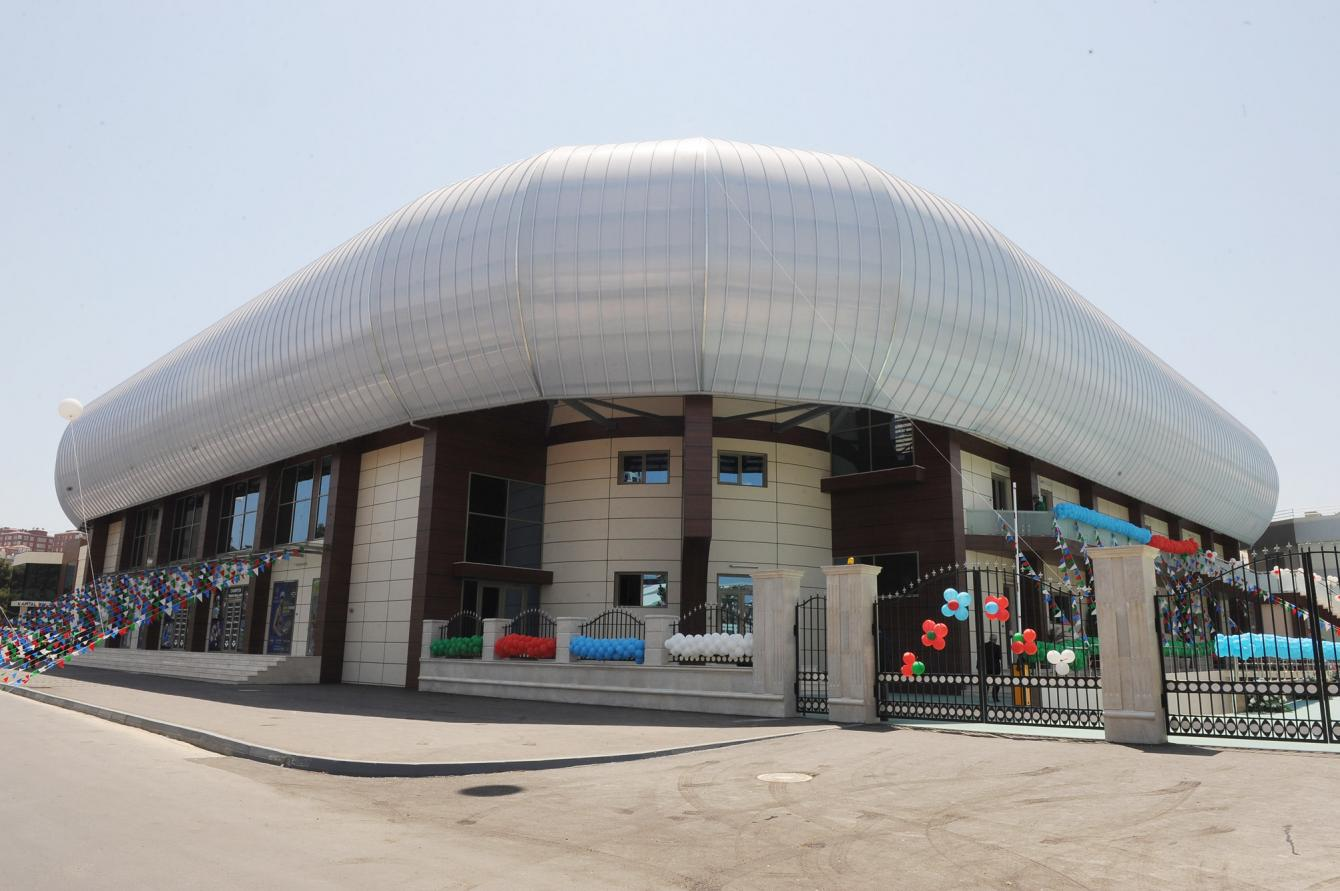
- Interactive map of Baku Tennis Academy
- Full name: Bakı Tennis Akademiyası
- Location: 8th Micro-District; Ibrahimpasha Dadashov str Baku, Azerbaijan
- Capacity: 3,000 (central court); 10,000 (main stadium)
- Surface: Hardcourt / Indoor

Construction
- Groundbreaking: May 2009
- Opened: June 2011

Tenant
- WTA Baku Cup

Baku Tennis Academy, is a tennis venue in Baku, Azerbaijan. The center currently hosts the Baku Cup. The main stadium has a capacity of 10,000 people. The central court has a capacity of 3,000, and the other 12 open/closed courts have a capacity of 200.

The Baku Tennis Academy was founded in 2009. The opening ceremony of the Baku Tennis Academy was held on May 5, 2009. The academy, covering an area of 2.7 hectares. The facility has hosted events for the Women's Tennis Association in the past.

During the 2017 Islamic Solidarity Games in Baku, the Baku Tennis Academy was used for a series of tennis competitions for 11 days.

It is the first tennis academy built in Azerbaijan. Construction began in March 2008. A large reservoir, pumping station, electric control room, and transformer substation were built here. These facilities provide the academy with water and electricity.

The coaches invited from abroad are taught at the academy. The length of the indoor hall is 126 meters and the width is 36 meters. It hosts 407 spectators. The area of each courtyard is 670 square meters, which is in accordance with international standards.

A sport pool and a gym are also in use at the Baku Tennis Academy. In addition, a central universal stadium with a total area of 2510 square meters with 3,000 spectators was built.

In addition to tennis, it is possible to hold the most prestigious championships and tournaments in volleyball, mini-football, basketball, handball, beach volleyball, wrestling, boxing, and other sports.

== See also ==
Baku Cup
