= Iga Świątek career statistics =

Statistics of Polish tennis player

Career finals
Discipline	Type	Won	Lost	Total
Singles	Grand Slam	6	0	6
Singles	WTA Finals	1	0	1
Singles	WTA 1000	12	2	14
Singles	WTA 500	6	2	8
Singles	WTA 250	1	1	2
Singles	Olympics	–	–	–
Singles	Total	26	5	31
Doubles	Grand Slam	0	1	1
Doubles	WTA Finals	–	–	–
Doubles	WTA 1000	–	–	–
Doubles	WTA 500	–	–	–
Doubles	WTA 250	–	–	–
Doubles	Olympics	–	–	–
Doubles	Total	0	1	1
Mixed	Grand Slam	0	1	1
Mixed	Olympics	–	–	–
Mixed	Total	0	1	1

This is a list of the main career statistics of Polish professional tennis player Iga Swiatek.

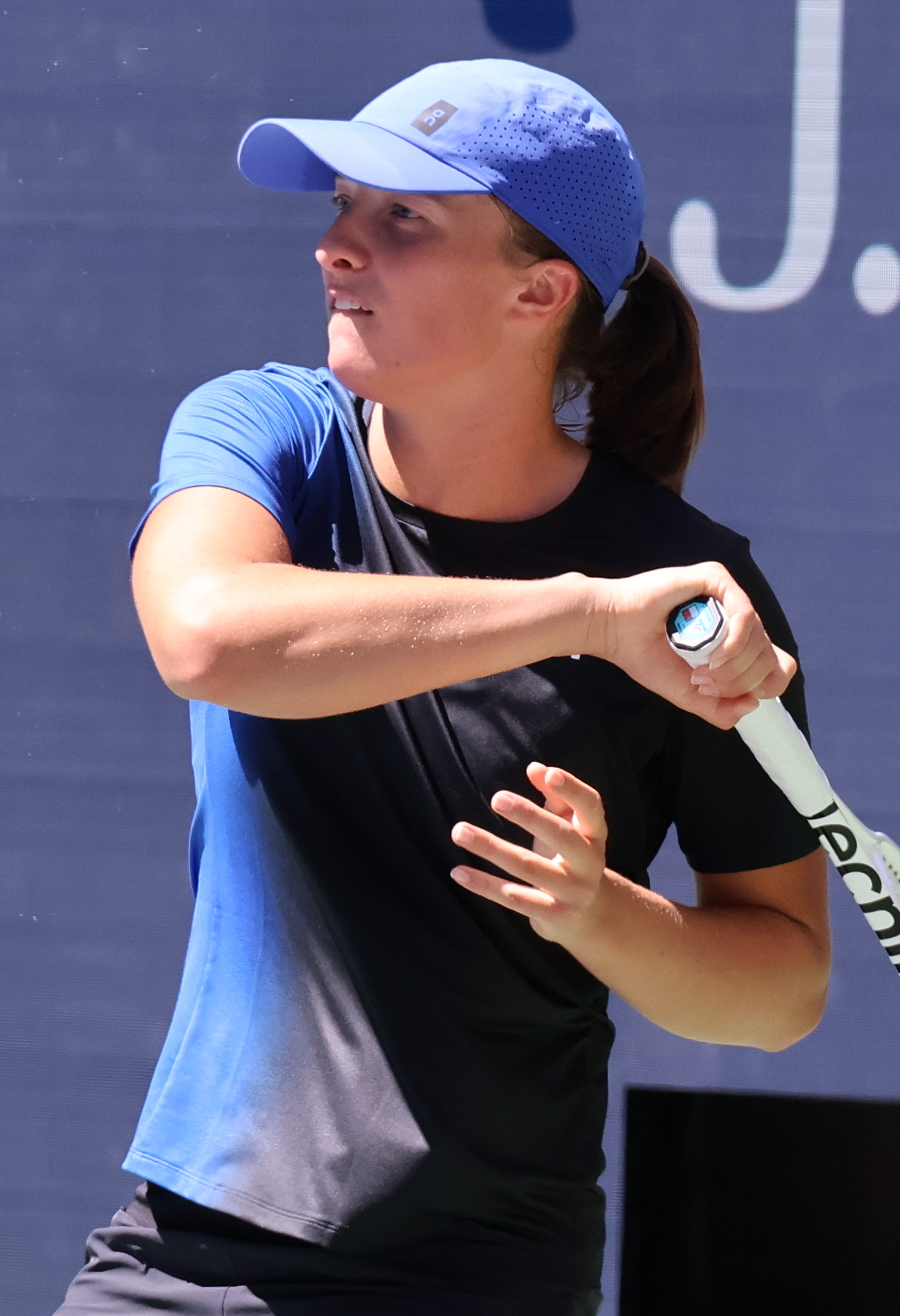
Świątek at the 2023 US Open.

== Performance timelines ==
Key
W	F	SF	QF	#R	RR	Q#	P#	DNQ	A	Z#	PO	G	S	B	NMS	NTI	P	NH

(W) winner; (F) finalist; (SF) semifinalist; (QF) quarterfinalist; (#R) rounds 4, 3, 2, 1; (RR) round-robin stage; (Q#) qualification round; (P#) preliminary round; (DNQ) did not qualify; (A) absent; (Z#) Davis/Fed Cup Zonal Group (with number indication) or (PO) play-off; (G) gold, (S) silver or (B) bronze Olympic/Paralympic medal; (NMS) not a Masters tournament; (NTI) not a Tier I tournament; (P) postponed; (NH) not held; (SR) strike rate (events won / competed); (W–L) win–loss record.
To avoid confusion and double counting, these charts are updated at the conclusion of a tournament or when the player's participation has ended.

=== Singles ===
Current through the 2026 WTA Finals.

Tournament	2019	2020	2021	2022	2023	2024	2025	2026	SR	W–L	Win %
Grand Slam tournaments
Australian Open	2R	4R	4R	SF	4R	3R	SF	QF	0 / 8	26–8	76%
French Open	4R	W	QF	W	W	W	SF	4R	4 / 8	43–4	91%
Wimbledon	1R	NH	4R	3R	QF	3R	W	3R	1 / 7	20–6	77%
US Open	2R	3R	4R	W	4R	QF	QF	4R	1 / 8	27–7	79%
Win–Loss	5–4	12–2	13–4	21–2	17–3	15–3	21–3	12–4	6 / 31	116–25	82%
Year-end championships
WTA Finals	DNQ	NH	RR	SF	W	RR	RR	A	1 / 5	12–6	67%
National representation
Billie Jean King Cup	Z1 PO	Z1 PO (Note: Edition is split into the two years due to COVID-19 pandemic.)		QR	A	SF	PO	A	0 / 5	14–2	88%
Summer Olympics	Not Held		2R	Not Held		B	Not Held		0 / 2	6–2	75%
WTA 1000 tournaments
Qatar Open	NTI	2R	NTI	W	NTI	W	SF	QF	2 / 5	15–3	83%
Dubai Championships	A	NTI	3R	NTI	F	SF	QF	A	0 / 4	9–4	69%
Indian Wells Open	Q2	NH	4R	W	SF	W	SF	QF	2 / 6	25–4	86%
Miami Open	Q2	NH	3R	W	A	4R	QF	2R	1 / 5	12–4	75%
Madrid Open	A	NH	3R	A	F	W	SF	3R	1 / 5	18–4	82%
Italian Open	A	1R	W	W	QF	W	3R	SF	3 / 7	25–4	86%
Canadian Open	3R	NH	A	3R	SF	A	4R	W	1 / 5	14–4	78%
Cincinnati Open	2R	1R	2R	3R	SF	SF	W	SF	1 / 8	17–7	71%
China Open	A	Not Held			W	A	4R	QF	1 / 3	11–2	85%
Wuhan Open	A	Not Held				A	QF	SF	0 / 2	5–2	71%
Win–Loss	3–2	1–3	12–5	24–2	27–6	30–3	28–9	26–8	12 / 50	151–38	80%
Career statistics
	2019	2020	2021	2022	2023	2024	2025	2026	SR	W–L	Win %
Tournaments	12	6	16	17	18	15	19	16	Career total: 119		
Titles	0	1	2	8	6	5	3	1	Career total: 26		
Finals	1	1	2	9	8	5	4	1	Career total: 31		
Hard Win–Loss	8–8	9–4	20–11	47–7	42–8	36–6	43–12	31–10	15 / 77	236–66	78%
Clay Win–Loss	7–3	7–1	12–2	18–1	19–2	26–2	11–4	9–4	10 / 30	109–19	85%
Grass Win–Loss	0–2	NH	4–2	2–1	7–1	2–1	10–1	2–2	1 / 12	27–10	73%
Overall Win–Loss	15–13	16–5	36–15	67–9	68–11	64–9	64–17	42–16	26 / 119	372–95	80%
Win %	54%	76%	71%	88%	86%	88%	79%	72%	Career total: 80%		
Year-end ranking	61	17	9	1	1	2	2	9			

=== Doubles ===
Current through the 2024 Billie Jean King Cup.

Tournament	2019	2020	2021	2022	2023	2024	SR	W–L	Win %
Grand Slam tournaments
Australian Open	A	A	A	A	A	A	0 / 0	0–0	–
French Open	A	SF	F	A	A	A	0 / 2	9–2	82%
Wimbledon	A	NH	A	A	A	A	0 / 0	0–0	–
US Open	2R	A	A	A	A	A	0 / 1	1–1	50%
Win–Loss	1–1	4–1	5–1	0–0	0–0	0–0	0 / 3	10–3	77%
WTA 1000 tournaments
Qatar Open	NTI	A	NTI	A	NTI	A	0 / 0	0–0	–
Dubai Championships	A	NTI	A	NTI	A	A	0 / 0	0–0	–
Indian Wells Open	A	NH	2R	A	A	A	0 / 1	1–1	50%
Miami Open	A	NH	SF	A	A	A	0 / 1	3–1	75%
Madrid Open	A	NH	2R	A	A	A	0 / 1	1–1	50%
Italian Open	A	A	A	A	A	A	0 / 0	0–0	–
Canadian Open	A	NH	A	A	A	A	0 / 0	0–0	–
Cincinnati Open	A	SF	QF	A	A	A	0 / 2	5–2	71%
China Open	A	Not Held			A	A	0 / 0	0–0	–
Wuhan Open	A	Not Held				A	0 / 0	0–0	–
Career statistics
	2019	2020	2021	2022	2023	2024	SR	W–L	Win%
Tournaments	2	2	5	0	0	0	Career total: 9		
Titles	0	0	0	0	0	0	Career total: 0		
Finals	0	0	1	0	0	0	Career total: 1		
Hard Win–Loss	3–1	3–1	6–3	0–0	0–0	1–1	0 / 5	13–7	65%
Clay Win–Loss	0–1	4–1	6–2	0–0	0–0	0–0	0 / 4	10–4	71%
Grass Win–Loss	0–0	NH	0–0	0–0	0–0	0–0	0 / 0	0–0	–
Overall Win–Loss	3–2	7–2	12–5	0–0	0–0	1–1	0 / 9	23–11	68%
Win %	60%	78%	71%	–	–	50%	Career total: 68%		
Year-end ranking	453	75	41	—	—	—			

=== Mixed doubles ===
Tournament	2019	2020	2021	2022	2023	2024	2025	2026	SR	W–L	Win %
Australian Open	2R	QF	2R	A	A	A	A	A	0 / 3	4–3	57%
French Open	A	NH	A	A	A	A	A	A	0 / 0	0–0	–
Wimbledon	A	NH	A	A	A	A	A	A	0 / 0	0–0	–
US Open	A	NH	A	A	A	A	F		0 / 1	3–1	75%
National representation
Summer Olympics	Not Held		QF	Not Held		A	Not Held		0 / 1	1–1	50%
Win–Loss	1–1	2–1	2–2	0–0	2–0	2–1	5–1	0–0	0 / 6	14–6	70%

Notes

- Only main-draw results in WTA Tour, Grand Slam tournaments, Billie Jean King Cup, United Cup, Hopman Cup and Olympic Games are included in win–loss records

== Grand Slam tournament finals ==
=== Singles: 6 (6 titles) ===
Result	Year	Tournament	Surface	Opponent	Score
Win	2020	French Open	Clay	(United States) Sofia Kenin	6–4, 6–1
Win	2022	French Open (2)	Clay	(United States) Coco Gauff	6–1, 6–3
Win	2022	US Open	Hard	(Tunisia) Ons Jabeur	6–2, 7–6^{(7–5)}
Win	2023	French Open (3)	Clay	(Czech Republic) Karolína Muchová	6–2, 5–7, 6–4
Win	2024	French Open (4)	Clay	(Italy) Jasmine Paolini	6–2, 6–1
Win	2025	Wimbledon	Grass	(United States) Amanda Anisimova	6–0, 6–0

=== Doubles: 1 (runner-up) ===
Result	Year	Tournament	Surface	Partner	Opponents	Score
Loss	2021	French Open	Clay	(United States) Bethanie Mattek-Sands	(Czech Republic) Barbora Krejčíková (Czech Republic) Kateřina Siniaková	4–6, 2–6

=== Mixed doubles: 1 (runner-up) ===
Result	Year	Tournament	Surface	Partner	Opponents	Score
Loss	2025	US Open	Hard	(Norway) Casper Ruud	(Italy) Sara Errani (Italy) Andrea Vavassori	3–6, 7–5, [6–10]

== Other significant finals ==
=== Year-end championships ===
==== Singles: 1 (title) ====
Result	Year	Tournament	Surface	Opponent	Score
Win	2023	WTA Finals, Cancún, Mexico	Hard	(United States) Jessica Pegula	6–1, 6–0

=== WTA 1000 tournaments ===
==== Singles: 14 (12 titles, 2 runner-ups) ====
Result	Year	Tournament	Surface	Opponent	Score
Win	2021	Italian Open	Clay	(Czech Republic) Karolína Plíšková	6–0, 6–0
Win	2022	Qatar Open	Hard	(Estonia) Anett Kontaveit	6–2, 6–0
Win	2022	Indian Wells Open	Hard	(Greece) Maria Sakkari	6–4, 6–1
Win	2022	Miami Open	Hard	(Japan) Naomi Osaka	6–4, 6–0
Win	2022	Italian Open (2)	Clay	(Tunisia) Ons Jabeur	6–2, 6–2
Loss	2023	Dubai Championships	Hard	(Czech Republic) Barbora Krejčíková	4–6, 2–6
Loss	2023	Madrid Open	Clay	Aryna Sabalenka	3–6, 6–3, 3–6
Win	2023	China Open	Hard	Liudmila Samsonova	6–2, 6–2
Win	2024	Qatar Open (2)	Hard	(Kazakhstan) Elena Rybakina	7–6^{(10–8)}, 6–2
Win	2024	Indian Wells Open (2)	Hard	(Greece) Maria Sakkari	6–4, 6–0
Win	2024	Madrid Open	Clay	Aryna Sabalenka	7–5, 4–6, 7–6^{(9–7)}
Win	2024	Italian Open (3)	Clay	Aryna Sabalenka	6–2, 6–3
Win	2025	Cincinnati Open	Hard	(Italy) Jasmine Paolini	7–5, 6–4
Win	2026	Canadian Open	Hard	(Kazakhstan) Elena Rybakina	6–2, 6–3

=== Summer Olympics ===
==== Singles: 1 (bronze medal) ====
Result	Year	Tournament	Surface	Opponent	Score
Bronze	2024	Paris Olympics, France	Clay	(Slovakia) Anna Karolína Schmiedlová	6–2, 6–1

== WTA Tour finals ==
=== Singles: 31 (26 titles, 5 runner-ups) ===
Legend Grand Slam (6–0) WTA Finals (1–0) WTA 1000 (12–2) WTA 500 (6–2) International / WTA 250 (1–1)	Finals by surface Hard (15–2) Clay (10–2) Grass (1–1)	Finals by setting Outdoor (24–4) Indoor (2–1)

Result	W–L	Date	Tournament	Tier	Surface	Opponent	Score
Loss	0–1	Apr 2019	Ladies Open Lugano, Switzerland	International	Clay	(Slovenia) Polona Hercog	3–6, 6–3, 3–6
Win	1–1	Oct 2020	French Open, France	Grand Slam	Clay	(United States) Sofia Kenin	6–4, 6–1
Win	2–1	Feb 2021	Adelaide International, Australia	WTA 500	Hard	(Switzerland) Belinda Bencic	6–2, 6–2
Win	3–1	May 2021	Italian Open, Italy	WTA 1000	Clay	(Czech Republic) Karolína Plíšková	6–0, 6–0
Win	4–1	Feb 2022	Qatar Open, Qatar	WTA 1000	Hard	(Estonia) Anett Kontaveit	6–2, 6–0
Win	5–1	Mar 2022	Indian Wells Open, United States	WTA 1000	Hard	(Greece) Maria Sakkari	6–4, 6–1
Win	6–1	Apr 2022	Miami Open, United States	WTA 1000	Hard	(Japan) Naomi Osaka	6–4, 6–0
Win	7–1	Apr 2022	Stuttgart Grand Prix, Germany	WTA 500	Clay (i)	Aryna Sabalenka	6–2, 6–2
Win	8–1	May 2022	Italian Open, Italy (2)	WTA 1000	Clay	(Tunisia) Ons Jabeur	6–2, 6–2
Win	9–1	Jun 2022	French Open, France (2)	Grand Slam	Clay	(United States) Coco Gauff	6–1, 6–3
Win	10–1	Sep 2022	US Open, United States	Grand Slam	Hard	(Tunisia) Ons Jabeur	6–2, 7–6^{(7–5)}
Loss	10–2	Oct 2022	Ostrava Open, Czech Republic	WTA 500	Hard (i)	(Czech Republic) Barbora Krejčíková	7–5, 6–7^{(4–7)}, 3–6
Win	11–2	Oct 2022	San Diego Open, United States	WTA 500	Hard	(Croatia) Donna Vekić	6–3, 3–6, 6–0
Win	12–2	Feb 2023	Qatar Open, Qatar (2)	WTA 500	Hard	(United States) Jessica Pegula	6–3, 6–0
Loss	12–3	Feb 2023	Dubai Championships, United Arab Emirates	WTA 1000	Hard	(Czech Republic) Barbora Krejčíková	4–6, 2–6
Win	13–3	Apr 2023	Stuttgart Grand Prix, Germany (2)	WTA 500	Clay (i)	Aryna Sabalenka	6–3, 6–4
Loss	13–4	May 2023	Madrid Open, Spain	WTA 1000	Clay	Aryna Sabalenka	3–6, 6–3, 3–6
Win	14–4	Jun 2023	French Open, France (3)	Grand Slam	Clay	(Czech Republic) Karolína Muchová	6–2, 5–7, 6–4
Win	15–4	Jul 2023	Poland Open, Poland	WTA 250	Hard	(Germany) Laura Siegemund	6–0, 6–1
Win	16–4	Oct 2023	China Open, China	WTA 1000	Hard	Liudmila Samsonova	6–2, 6–2
Win	17–4	Nov 2023	WTA Finals, Mexico	Finals	Hard	(United States) Jessica Pegula	6–1, 6–0
Win	18–4	Feb 2024	Qatar Open, Qatar (3)	WTA 1000	Hard	(Kazakhstan) Elena Rybakina	7–6^{(10–8)}, 6–2
Win	19–4	Mar 2024	Indian Wells Open, United States (2)	WTA 1000	Hard	(Greece) Maria Sakkari	6–4, 6–0
Win	20–4	May 2024	Madrid Open, Spain	WTA 1000	Clay	Aryna Sabalenka	7–5, 4–6, 7–6^{(9–7)}
Win	21–4	May 2024	Italian Open, Italy (3)	WTA 1000	Clay	Aryna Sabalenka	6–2, 6–3
Win	22–4	Jun 2024	French Open, France (4)	Grand Slam	Clay	(Italy) Jasmine Paolini	6–2, 6–1
Loss	22–5	Jun 2025	Bad Homburg Open, Germany	WTA 500	Grass	(United States) Jessica Pegula	4–6, 5–7
Win	23–5	Jul 2025	Wimbledon, United Kingdom	Grand Slam	Grass	(United States) Amanda Anisimova	6–0, 6–0
Win	24–5	Aug 2025	Cincinnati Open, United States	WTA 1000	Hard	(Italy) Jasmine Paolini	7–5, 6–4
Win	25–5	Sep 2025	Korea Open, South Korea	WTA 500	Hard	Ekaterina Alexandrova	1–6, 7–6^{(7–3)}, 7–5
Win	26–5	Aug 2026	Canadian Open, Canada	WTA 1000	Hard	(Kazakhstan) Elena Rybakina	6–2, 6–3

=== Doubles: 1 (runner-up) ===
Legend Grand Slam (0–1)	Finals by surface Clay (0–1)	Finals by setting Outdoor (0–1)

Result	Date	Tournament	Tier	Surface	Partner	Opponents	Score
Loss	Jun 2021	French Open, France	Grand Slam	Clay	(United States) Bethanie Mattek-Sands	(Czech Republic) Barbora Krejčíková (Czech Republic) Kateřina Siniaková	4–6, 2–6

Notes

- The WTA International tournaments were reclassified as WTA 250 tournaments in 2021.

== ITF Circuit finals ==
Świątek made her debut at the ITF Women's Circuit in 2016 at Stockholm, where she also won her first ITF title. Since then, she reached seven singles finals in total, winning all of them. Her most significant titles are two $60k events, Budapest Ladies Open and Montreux Ladies Open, both achieved in 2018. In doubles, she reached only one final, but failed to win the title.

=== Singles: 7 (7 titles) ===
Legend 60k tournaments (2–0) 25k tournaments (1–0) 15k tournaments (4–0)	Finals by surface Hard (2–0) Clay (5–0)

Result	W–L	Date	Tournament	Tier	Surface	Opponent	Score
Win	1–0	Oct 2016	ITF Stockholm, Sweden	10k	Hard (i)	(Romania) Laura Ioana Paar	6–4, 6–3
Win	2–0	Feb 2017	ITF Bergamo, Italy	15k	Clay (i)	(Italy) Martina di Giuseppe	6–4, 3–6, 6–3
Win	3–0	May 2017	ITF Győr, Hungary	15k	Clay	(Czech Republic) Gabriela Horáčková	6–2, 6–2
Win	4–0	Feb 2018	ITF Sharm El Sheikh, Egypt	15k	Hard	(Belgium) Britt Geukens	6–3, 6–1
Win	5–0	Apr 2018	ITF Pelham, United States	25k	Clay	(United States) Allie Kiick	6–2, 6–0
Win	6–0	Sep 2018	Budapest Ladies Open, Hungary	60k	Clay	(Ukraine) Katarina Zavatska	6–2, 6–2
Win	7–0	Sep 2018	Montreux Ladies Open, Switzerland	60k	Clay	(Belgium) Kimberley Zimmermann	6–2, 6–2

=== Doubles: 1 (runner-up) ===
Legend 15k tournaments (0–1)	Finals by surface Hard (0–1)

Result	Date	Tournament	Tier	Surface	Partner	Opponents	Score
Loss	Feb 2018	ITF Sharm El Sheikh, Egypt	15k	Hard	(Germany) Constanze Stepan	(Russia) Anna Morgina (Russia) Valeriya Solovyeva	4–6, 2–6

== Billie Jean King Cup participation ==
Świątek made her debut at the Fed Cup playing for Poland in 2018. Since then, she has a singles record of 14–2, and a doubles record of 3–2.

Legend	Meaning
F QR / Z RR / Z PO (9–3)	Finals qualifying round / Zone Group round robin / play-off

=== Singles: 16 (14 wins, 2 losses) ===
Edition	Stage	Date	Location	Surface	Against	Opponent	W/L	Score
2018	Z1 PO	Feb 2018	Tallinn, Estonia	Hard (i)	Bulgaria	Petia Arshinkova	W	6–0, 6–4
2019	Z1 RR	Feb 2019	Zielona Góra, Poland	Hard (i)	Russia	Natalia Vikhlyantseva	L	0–6, 2–6
2019	Z1 RR	Feb 2019	Zielona Góra, Poland	Hard (i)	Denmark	Clara Tauson	W	6–3, 7–6^{(9–7)}
2019	Z1 PO	Feb 2019	Zielona Góra, Poland	Hard (i)	Ukraine	Dayana Yastremska	L	6–7^{(2–7)}, 4–6
2020–21	Z1 RR	Feb 2020	Esch-sur-Alzette, Luxembourg	Hard (i)	Slovenia	Nika Radišić	W	6–2, 6–1
2020–21	Z1 RR	Feb 2020	Esch-sur-Alzette, Luxembourg	Hard (i)	Turkey	Berfu Cengiz	W	6–3, 6–0
2020–21	Z1 PO	Feb 2020	Esch-sur-Alzette, Luxembourg	Hard (i)	Sweden	Mirjam Björklund	W	7–5, 4–6, 6–3
2022	F QR	Apr 2022	Radom, Poland	Hard (i)	Romania	Mihaela Buzărnescu	W	6–1, 6–0
2022	F QR	Apr 2022	Radom, Poland	Hard (i)	Romania	Andreea Prisăcariu	W	6–0, 6–0
2024	F QR	Apr 2024	Biel/Bienne, Switzerland	Hard (i)	Switzerland	Simona Waltert	W	6–3, 6–1
2024	F QR	Apr 2024	Biel/Bienne, Switzerland	Hard (i)	Switzerland	Céline Naef	W	6–4, 6–3
2024	F 1R	Nov 2024	Málaga, Spain	Hard (i)	Spain	Paula Badosa	W	6–3, 6–7^{(5–7)}, 6–1
2024	F QF	Nov 2024	Málaga, Spain	Hard (i)	Czech Republic	Linda Nosková	W	7–6^{(7–4)}, 4–6, 7–5
2024	F SF	Nov 2024	Málaga, Spain	Hard (i)	Italy	Jasmine Paolini	W	3–6, 6–4, 6–4
2025	PO	Nov 2025	Gorzów Wielkopolski, Poland	Hard (i)	New Zealand	Elyse Tse	W	6–0, 6–1
2025	PO	Nov 2025	Gorzów Wielkopolski, Poland	Hard (i)	Romania	Gabriela Lee	W	6–2, 6–0

=== Doubles: 5 (3 wins, 2 losses) ===
Edition	Stage	Date	Location	Surface	Partner	Against	Opponents	W/L	Score
2018	Z1 RR	Feb 2018	Tallinn, Estonia	Hard (i)	Alicja Rosolska	Turkey	Ayla Aksu; Başak Eraydın	L	3–6, 6–2, 1–6
2019	Z1 RR	Feb 2019	Zielona Góra, Poland	Hard (i)	Alicja Rosolska	Russia	Margarita Gasparyan; Daria Kasatkina	W	6–0, 3–6, 6–3
2019	Z1 PO	Feb 2019	Zielona Góra, Poland	Hard (i)	Alicja Rosolska	Ukraine	Marta Kostyuk; Kateryna Baindl	W	6–1, 1–6, 7–6^{(7–5)}
2024	F QF	Nov 2024	Málaga, Spain	Hard (i)	Katarzyna Kawa	Czech Republic	Marie Bouzková; Kateřina Siniaková	W	6–2, 6–4
2024	F SF	Nov 2024	Málaga, Spain	Hard (i)	Katarzyna Kawa	Italy	Sara Errani; Jasmine Paolini	L	5–7, 5–7

== ITF Junior Circuit ==
=== Junior Grand Slam finals ===
==== Singles: 1 (title) ====
Result	Year	Tournament	Surface	Opponent	Score
Win	2018	Wimbledon	Grass	(Switzerland) Leonie Küng	6–4, 6–2

==== Doubles: 2 (1 title, 1 runner-up) ====
Result	Year	Tournament	Surface	Partner	Opponents	Score
Loss	2017	Australian Open	Hard	(Poland) Maja Chwalińska	(Canada) Bianca Andreescu (United States) Carson Branstine	1–6, 6–7^{(4–7)}
Win	2018	French Open	Clay	(United States) Caty McNally	(Japan) Yuki Naito (Japan) Naho Sato	6–2, 7–5

=== ITF Junior Circuit finals ===
==== Singles: 8 (6 titles, 2 runner-ups) ====
Legend
Grade A (1–1)
Grade 1 (2–0)
Grade 2 (0–1)
Grade 4 (3–0)

Result	W–L	Date	Tournament	Tier	Surface	Opponent	Score
Win	1–0	Apr 2015	ITF Nottingham, United Kingdom	G4	Hard	(United Kingdom) Emily Smith	6–4, 3–6, 6–3
Win	2–0	May 2015	ITF Budapest, Hungary	G4	Clay	(Czech Republic) Johana Markova	6–2, 6–2
Win	3–0	Jun 2015	ITF Riga, Latvia	G4	Clay	(Lithuania) Paulina Bakaite	6–3, 6–0
Loss	3–1	Sep 2015	ITF Prague, Czech Republic	G2	Clay	(Ukraine) Anastasia Zarycká	5–7, 1–6
Win	4–1	Sep 2016	ITF Repentigny, Canada	G1	Hard	(Serbia) Olga Danilović	3–6, 2–0 ret.
Win	5–1	Jan 2017	ITF Traralgon, Australia	G1	Hard	(Ukraine) Marta Kostyuk	6–3, 6–3
Loss	5–2	May 2017	ITF Milan, Italy	GA	Clay	(Russia) Elena Rybakina	6–1, 6–7^{(5–7)}, 3–6
Win	6–2	Jul 2018	Wimbledon, United Kingdom	GA	Grass	(Switzerland) Leonie Küng	6–4, 6–2

==== Doubles: 5 (3 titles, 2 runner-ups) ====
Legend
Grade A (1–1)
Grade 1 (1–0)
Grade 2 (0–1)
Grade 4 (1–0)

Result	W–L	Date	Tournament	Tier	Surface	Partner	Opponents	Score
Win	1–0	Jun 2015	ITF Riga, Latvia	G4	Clay	(Poland) Wiktoria Rutkowska	(Belarus) Ninel Batalova (Belarus) Hanna Sokal	6–3, 6–4
Loss	1–1	Sep 2015	ITF Prague, Czech Republic	G2	Clay	(Poland) Daria Kuczer	(Slovakia) Barbora Matusova (Germany) Eva Marie Voracek	6–7^{(4–7)}, 1–6
Win	2–1	Jan 2017	ITF Traralgon, Australia	G1	Hard	(Poland) Maja Chwalińska	(Australia) Gabriella Da Silva-Fick (Australia) Kaitlin Staines	3–6, 6–4, [10–7]
Loss	2–2	Jan 2017	Australian Open, Australia	GA	Hard	(Poland) Maja Chwalińska	(Canada) Bianca Andreescu (United States) Carson Branstine	1–6, 6–7^{(4–7)}
Win	3–2	Jun 2018	French Open, France	GA	Clay	(United States) Caty McNally	(Japan) Yuki Naito (Japan) Naho Sato	6–2, 7–5

==== Team competition: 1 (title) ====
Result	W–L	Date	Team competition	Surface	Partner/Team	Opponents	Score
Win	1–0	Oct 2016	Junior Fed Cup, Budapest, Hungary	Clay	(Poland) Maja Chwalińska (Poland) Stefania Rogozińska-Dzik	(United States) Amanda Anisimova (United States) Claire Liu (United States) Caty McNally	2–1

== WTA Tour career earnings ==
Current through 10 August 2026

Year	Grand Slam titles	WTA titles	Total titles	Earnings ($)	Money list rank
2019	0	0	0	633,807	65
2020	1	0	1	2,261,213	3
2021	0	2	2	1,923,151	11
2022	2	6	8	9,875,525	1
2023	1	5	6	9,857,686	1
2024	1	4	5	8,550,693	3
2025	1	2	3	10,112,532	2
2026	0	1	1	3,331,279	10
Career	6	20	26	46,971,769	3

Notes

- Grand Slam titles, WTA titles, Total titles – Includes singles, doubles and mixed doubles titles.

== Career Grand Slam statistics ==
=== Best Grand Slam results details ===
Australian Open
2022 Australian Open (7th seed)
Round	Opponent	Rank	Score
1R	(United Kingdom) Harriet Dart (Q)	123	6–3, 6–0
2R	(Sweden) Rebecca Peterson	82	6–2, 6–2
3R	(Russia) Daria Kasatkina (25)	23	6–2, 6–3
4R	(Romania) Sorana Cîrstea	38	5–7, 6–3, 6–3
QF	(Estonia) Kaia Kanepi	115	4–6, 7–6^{(7–2)}, 6–3
SF	(United States) Danielle Collins (27)	30	4–6, 1–6
2025 Australian Open (2nd seed)
Round	Opponent	Rank	Score
1R	(Czech Republic) Kateřina Siniaková	50	6–3, 6–4
2R	(Slovakia) Rebecca Šramková	49	6–0, 6–2
3R	(United Kingdom) Emma Raducanu	61	6–1, 6–0
4R	(Germany) Eva Lys (LL)	128	6–0, 6–1
QF	(United States) Emma Navarro (8)	**8**	6–1, 6–2
SF	**(United States) Madison Keys (19)**	14	7–5, 1–6, 6–7^{(8–10)}

Wimbledon
2025 Wimbledon (8th seed)
Round	Opponent	Rank	Score
1R	Polina Kudermetova	64	7–5, 6–1
2R	(United States) Caty McNally (PR)	208	5–7, 6–2, 6–1
3R	(United States) Danielle Collins	54	6–2, 6–3
4R	(Denmark) Clara Tauson (23)	22	6–4, 6–1
QF	Liudmila Samsonova (19)	19	6–2, 7–5
SF	(Switzerland) Belinda Bencic	35	6–2, 6–0
**W**	(United States) Amanda Anisimova (13)	12	6–0, 6–0

French Open
2020 French Open (unseeded)
Round	Opponent	Rank	Score
1R	(Czech Republic) Markéta Vondroušová (15)	19	6–1, 6–2
2R	(Chinese Taipei) Hsieh Su-wei	63	6–1, 6–4
3R	(Canada) Eugenie Bouchard (WC)	168	6–3, 6–2
4R	(Romania) Simona Halep (1)	**2**	6–1, 6–2
QF	(Italy) Martina Trevisan (Q)	159	6–3, 6–1
SF	(Argentina) Nadia Podoroska (Q)	131	6–2, 6–1
**W**	(United States) Sofia Kenin (4)	**6**	6–4, 6–1
2022 French Open (1st seed)
Round	Opponent	Rank	Score
1R	(Ukraine) Lesia Tsurenko (Q)	119	6–2, 6–0
2R	(United States) Alison Riske-Amritraj	43	6–0, 6–2
3R	(Montenegro) Danka Kovinić	95	6–3, 7–5
4R	(China) Zheng Qinwen	74	6–7^{(5–7)}, 6–0, 6–2
QF	(United States) Jessica Pegula (11)	11	6–3, 6–2
SF	Daria Kasatkina (20)	20	6–2, 6–1
**W**	(United States) Coco Gauff (18)	23	6–1, 6–3
2023 French Open (1st seed)
Round	Opponent	Rank	Score
1R	(Spain) Cristina Bucșa	70	6–4, 6–0
2R	(United States) Claire Liu	102	6–4, 6–0
3R	(China) Wang Xinyu	80	6–0, 6–0
4R	(Ukraine) Lesia Tsurenko	66	5–1 ret.
QF	(United States) Coco Gauff (6)	**6**	6–4, 6–2
SF	(Brazil) Beatriz Haddad Maia (14)	14	6–2, 7–6^{(9–7)}
**W**	(Czech Republic) Karolína Muchová	43	6–2, 5–7, 6–4
2024 French Open (1st seed)
Round	Opponent	Rank	Score
1R	(France) Léolia Jeanjean (Q)	148	6–1, 6–2
2R	(Japan) Naomi Osaka (PR)	134	7–6^{(7–1)}, 1–6, 7–5
3R	(Czech Republic) Marie Bouzková	42	6–4, 6–2
4R	Anastasia Potapova	41	6–0, 6–0
QF	(Czech Republic) Markéta Vondroušová (5)	**6**	6–0, 6–2
SF	(United States) Coco Gauff (3)	**3**	6–2, 6–4
**W**	(Italy) Jasmine Paolini (12)	15	6–2, 6–1

US Open
2022 US Open (1st seed)
Round	Opponent	Rank	Score
1R	(Italy) Jasmine Paolini	56	6–3, 6–0
2R	(United States) Sloane Stephens	51	6–3, 6–2
3R	(United States) Lauren Davis	105	6–3, 6–4
4R	(Germany) Jule Niemeier	108	2–6, 6–4, 6–0
QF	(United States) Jessica Pegula (8)	**8**	6–3, 7–6^{(7–4)}
SF	Aryna Sabalenka (6)	**6**	3–6, 6–1, 6–4
**W**	(Tunisia) Ons Jabeur (5)	**5**	6–2, 7–6^{(7–5)}

=== Grand Slam tournament seedings ===
Legend seeded No. 1 (**4** / 11) seeded No. 2 (0 / 3) seeded No. 3 (0 / 2) seeded No. 4–10 (**1** / 6) seeded No. 11–32 (0 / 1) unseeded (**1** / 7)	Longest streak 11 2 2 4 1 7

Season	Australian Open	French Open	Wimbledon	US Open
2019	qualifier	unseeded	unseeded	unseeded
2020	unseeded	**unseeded (1)**	cancelled	unseeded
2021	15th	8th	7th	7th
2022	7th	**1st (2)**	1st	**1st (3)**
2023	1st	**1st (4)**	1st	1st
2024	1st	**1st (5)**	1st	1st
2025	2nd	5th	**8th (6)**	2nd
2026	2nd	3rd	3rd	

Notes

- Slams won indicated in **bold**.

== Wins against top 10 players ==
- Świątek has a 57–32 record against players who were, at the time the match was played, ranked in the top 10.

Season	2019	2020	2021	2022	2023	2024	2025	2026	Total
Wins	0	2	3	15	13	11	9	4	57
Losses	2	0	4	2	6	5	8	5	32

No.	Player	Rk	Event	Surface	Rd	Score	Rk	Years	Ref
1	(Romania) Simona Halep	2	French Open, France	Clay	4R	6–1, 6–2	54	2020	
2	(United States) Sofia Kenin	6	French Open, France	Clay	F	6–4, 6–1	54	2020	
3	(Ukraine) Elina Svitolina	6	Italian Open, Italy	Clay	QF	6–2, 7–5	15	2021	
4	(Czech Republic) Karolína Plíšková	9	Italian Open, Italy	Clay	F	6–0, 6–0	15	2021	
5	(Spain) Paula Badosa	10	WTA Finals, Mexico	Hard	RR	7–5, 6–4	9	2021	
6	(Belarus) Aryna Sabalenka	2	Qatar Open, Qatar	Hard	QF	6–2, 6–3	8	2022	
7	(Greece) Maria Sakkari	6	Qatar Open, Qatar	Hard	SF	6–4, 6–3	8	2022	
8	(Estonia) Anett Kontaveit	7	Qatar Open, Qatar	Hard	F	6–2, 6–0	8	2022	
9	(Greece) Maria Sakkari	6	Indian Wells Open, United States	Hard	F	6–4, 6–1	4	2022	
10	Aryna Sabalenka	4	Stuttgart Open, Germany	Clay (i)	F	6–2, 6–2	1	2022	
11	Aryna Sabalenka	8	Italian Open, Italy	Clay	SF	6–2, 6–1	1	2022	
12	(Tunisia) Ons Jabeur	7	Italian Open, Italy	Clay	F	6–2, 6–2	1	2022	
13	(United States) Jessica Pegula	8	US Open, United States	Hard	QF	6–3, 7–6^{(7–4)}	1	2022	
14	Aryna Sabalenka	6	US Open, United States	Hard	SF	3–6, 6–1, 6–4	1	2022	
15	(Tunisia) Ons Jabeur	5	US Open, United States	Hard	F	6–2, 7–6^{(7–5)}	1	2022	
16	(United States) Coco Gauff	8	San Diego Open, United States	Hard	QF	6–0, 6–3	1	2022	
17	(United States) Jessica Pegula	6	San Diego Open, United States	Hard	SF	4–6, 6–2, 6–2	1	2022	
18	Daria Kasatkina	8	WTA Finals, United States	Hard (i)	RR	6–2, 6–3	1	2022	
19	(France) Caroline Garcia	6	WTA Finals, United States	Hard (i)	RR	6–3, 6–2	1	2022	
20	(United States) Coco Gauff	4	WTA Finals, United States	Hard (i)	RR	6–3, 6–0	1	2022	
21	(United States) Jessica Pegula	4	Qatar Open, Qatar	Hard	F	6–3, 6–0	1	2023	
22	(United States) Coco Gauff	6	Dubai Tennis Championships, UAE	Hard	SF	6–4, 6–2	1	2023	
23	(Tunisia) Ons Jabeur	4	Stuttgart Open, Germany	Clay (i)	SF	3–0, ret.	1	2023	
24	Aryna Sabalenka	2	Stuttgart Open, Germany	Clay (i)	F	6–3, 6–4	1	2023	
25	(United States) Coco Gauff	6	French Open, France	Clay	QF	6–4, 6–2	1	2023	
26	(Czech Republic) Markéta Vondroušová	10	Cincinnati Open, United States	Hard	QF	7–6^{(7–3)}, 6–1	1	2023	
27	(France) Caroline Garcia	10	China Open, China	Hard	QF	6–7^{(8–10)}, 7–6^{(7–5)}, 6–1	2	2023	
28	(United States) Coco Gauff	3	China Open, China	Hard	SF	6–2, 6–3	2	2023	
29	(Czech Republic) Markéta Vondroušová	6	WTA Finals, Mexico	Hard	RR	7–6^{(7–3)}, 6–0	2	2023	
30	(United States) Coco Gauff	3	WTA Finals, Mexico	Hard	RR	6–0, 7–5	2	2023	
31	(Tunisia) Ons Jabeur	7	WTA Finals, Mexico	Hard	RR	6–1, 6–2	2	2023	
32	Aryna Sabalenka	1	WTA Finals, Mexico	Hard	SF	6–3, 6–2	2	2023	
33	(United States) Jessica Pegula	5	WTA Finals, Mexico	Hard	F	6–1, 6–0	2	2023	
34	(Kazakhstan) Elena Rybakina	4	Qatar Open, Qatar	Hard	F	7–6^{(10–8)}, 6–2	1	2024	
35	(China) Zheng Qinwen	7	Dubai Championships, UAE	Hard	QF	6–3, 6–2	1	2024	
36	(Greece) Maria Sakkari	9	Indian Wells Open, United States	Hard	F	6–4, 6–0	1	2024	
37	Aryna Sabalenka	2	Madrid Open, Spain	Clay	F	7–5, 4–6, 7–6^{(9–7)}	1	2024	
38	(United States) Coco Gauff	3	Italian Open, Italy	Clay	SF	6–4, 6–3	1	2024	
39	Aryna Sabalenka	2	Italian Open, Italy	Clay	F	6–2, 6–3	1	2024	
40	(Czech Republic) Markéta Vondroušová	6	French Open, France	Clay	QF	6–0, 6–2	1	2024	
41	(United States) Coco Gauff	3	French Open, France	Clay	SF	6–2, 6–4	1	2024	
42	(United States) Danielle Collins	9	Paris Olympics, France	Clay	QF	6–1, 2–6, 4–1 ret.	1	2024	
43	Daria Kasatkina	9	WTA Finals, Saudi Arabia	Hard (i)	RR	6–1, 6–0	2	2024	
44	(Italy) Jasmine Paolini	4	Billie Jean King Cup, Spain	Hard (i)	SF	3–6, 6–4, 6–4	2	2024	
45	(Kazakhstan) Elena Rybakina	6	United Cup, Australia	Hard	SF	7–6^{(7–5)}, 6–4	2	2025	
46	(United States) Emma Navarro	8	Australian Open, Australia	Hard	QF	6–1, 6–2	2	2025	
47	(Kazakhstan) Elena Rybakina	7	Qatar Open, Qatar	Hard	QF	6–2, 7–5	2	2025	
48	(China) Zheng Qinwen	9	Indian Wells Open, United States	Hard	QF	6–3, 6–3	2	2025	
49	(United States) Madison Keys	5	Madrid Open, Spain	Clay	QF	0–6, 6–3, 6–2	2	2025	
50	(Italy) Jasmine Paolini	4	Bad Homburg Open, Germany	Grass	SF	6–1, 6–3	8	2025	
51	(Kazakhstan) Elena Rybakina	10	Cincinnati Open, United States	Hard	SF	7–5, 6–3	3	2025	
52	(Italy) Jasmine Paolini	9	Cincinnati Open, United States	Hard	F	7–5, 6–4	3	2025	
53	(United States) Madison Keys	7	WTA Finals, Saudi Arabia	Hard (i)	RR	6–1, 6–2	2	2025	
54	(United States) Jessica Pegula	5	Italian Open, Italy	Clay	QF	6–1, 6–2	3	2026	
55	(Ukraine) Elina Svitolina	9	Canadian Open, Canada	Hard	SF	6–3, 1–6, 6–3	8	2026	
56	(Kazakhstan) Elena Rybakina	2	Canadian Open, Canada	Hard	F	6–2, 6–3	8	2026	
57	(Kazakhstan) Elena Rybakina	2	Cincinnati Open, United States	Hard	QF	4–1 ret.	5	2026	

- Key: (Rk) first use, opponent rank; (Rd) round; (Rk) 2nd use, player rank; (Ref) reference; (F) final; (SF) semifinal; (QF) quarterfinal; (#R) rounds 4, 3, 2, 1; (RR) round-robin stage; (Q#) qualifying rounds or stages (3), 2, 1.

== Double-bagel matches ==
=== Singles ===
Result	W–L	Year	Tournament	Tier	Surface	Opponent	Rk	Rd
Win	1–0	2018	ITF Jackson, United States	25,000	Clay	(Brazil) Vivian Toma	–	Q1
Win	2–0	2018	ITF Jackson, United States	25,000	Clay	(United States) Alessandra Crump	–	Q2
Win	3–0	2018	ITF Pelham, United States	25,000	Clay	(Mexico) Andrea Renee Villarreal	886	Q3
Win	4–0	2021	Italian Open, Italy	WTA 1000	Clay	(Czech Republic) Karolína Plíšková	9	F
Win	5–0	2022	Billie Jean King Cup, Poland	Team	Hard (i)	(Romania) Andreea Prisăcariu	324	Q
Win	6–0	2023	Italian Open, Italy	WTA 1000	Clay	Anastasia Pavlyuchenkova	506	2R
Win	7–0	2023	French Open, France	Grand Slam	Clay	(China) Wang Xinyu	80	3R
Win	8–0	2024	French Open, France	Grand Slam	Clay	Anastasia Potapova	41	4R
Win	9–0	2025	Wimbledon, United Kingdom	Grand Slam	Grass	(United States) Amanda Anisimova	13	F

=== Mixed doubles ===
Result	W–L	Year	Tournament	Tier	Surface	Partner	Opponents	Rd
Win	1–0	2024	United Cup, Australia	Team	Hard	(Poland) Hubert Hurkacz	(Spain) Sara Sorribes Tormo (Spain) Alejandro Davidovich Fokina	RR

== Longest winning streak ==
Świątek's 37-match win streak in 2022 is the longest in the 21st century and is tied for the 12th longest in the Open Era.

=== 37-match win streak (2022) ===
No.	Tournament	Tier	Start date	Surface	Rd	Opponent	Rk	Score
–	Dubai Championships	WTA 500	14 February 2022	Hard	2R	(Latvia) Jeļena Ostapenko	21	6–4, 1–6, 6–7^{(4–7)}
1	Qatar Open	WTA 1000	21 February 2022	Hard	2R	(Switzerland) Viktorija Golubic	36	6–2, 3–6, 6–2
2	Qatar Open	WTA 1000	21 February 2022	Hard	3R	(Russia) Daria Kasatkina	28	6–3, 6–0
3	Qatar Open	WTA 1000	21 February 2022	Hard	QF	(Belarus) Aryna Sabalenka (1)	2	6–2, 6–3
4	Qatar Open	WTA 1000	21 February 2022	Hard	SF	(Greece) Maria Sakkari (6)	6	6–4, 6–3
5	Qatar Open	WTA 1000	21 February 2022	Hard	W	(Estonia) Anett Kontaveit (4)	7	6–2, 6–0
6	Indian Wells Open	WTA 1000	7 March 2022	Hard	2R	(Ukraine) Anhelina Kalinina	50	5–7, 6–0, 6–1
7	Indian Wells Open	WTA 1000	7 March 2022	Hard	3R	(Denmark) Clara Tauson (29)	40	6–7^{(3–7)}, 6–2, 6–1
8	Indian Wells Open	WTA 1000	7 March 2022	Hard	4R	(Germany) Angelique Kerber (15)	16	4–6, 6–2, 6–3
9	Indian Wells Open	WTA 1000	7 March 2022	Hard	QF	(United States) Madison Keys (25)	29	6–1, 6–0
10	Indian Wells Open	WTA 1000	7 March 2022	Hard	SF	(Romania) Simona Halep (24)	26	7–6^{(8–6)}, 6–4
11	Indian Wells Open	WTA 1000	7 March 2022	Hard	W	(Greece) Maria Sakkari (6)	6	6–4, 6–1
12	Miami Open	WTA 1000	21 March 2022	Hard	2R	(Switzerland) Viktorija Golubic	42	6–2, 6–0
13	Miami Open	WTA 1000	21 March 2022	Hard	3R	(United States) Madison Brengle	59	6–0, 6–3
14	Miami Open	WTA 1000	21 March 2022	Hard	4R	(United States) Coco Gauff (14)	17	6–3, 6–1
15	Miami Open	WTA 1000	21 March 2022	Hard	QF	(Czech Republic) Petra Kvitová (28)	32	6–3, 6–3
16	Miami Open	WTA 1000	21 March 2022	Hard	SF	(United States) Jessica Pegula (16)	21	6–2, 7–5
17	Miami Open	WTA 1000	21 March 2022	Hard	W	(Japan) Naomi Osaka	77	6–4, 6–0
18	Billie Jean King Cup	Team	15 April 2022	Hard (i)	QR	(Romania) Mihaela Buzărnescu	123	6–1, 6–0
19	Billie Jean King Cup	Team	15 April 2022	Hard (i)	QR	(Romania) Andreea Prisăcariu	324	6–0, 6–0
20	Stuttgart Open	WTA 500	18 April 2022	Clay (i)	2R	(Germany) Eva Lys (Q)	342	6–1, 6–1
21	Stuttgart Open	WTA 500	18 April 2022	Clay (i)	QF	(United Kingdom) Emma Raducanu (8)	12	6–4, 6–4
22	Stuttgart Open	WTA 500	18 April 2022	Clay (i)	SF	Liudmila Samsonova	31	6–7^{(4–7)}, 6–4, 7–5
23	Stuttgart Open	WTA 500	18 April 2022	Clay (i)	W	Aryna Sabalenka (3)	4	6–2, 6–2
24	Italian Open	WTA 1000	9 May 2022	Clay	2R	(Romania) Elena-Gabriela Ruse (LL)	57	6–3, 6–0
25	Italian Open	WTA 1000	9 May 2022	Clay	3R	Victoria Azarenka (16)	16	6–4, 6–1
26	Italian Open	WTA 1000	9 May 2022	Clay	QF	(Canada) Bianca Andreescu (PR)	90	7–6^{(7–2)}, 6–0
27	Italian Open	WTA 1000	9 May 2022	Clay	SF	Aryna Sabalenka (3)	8	6–2, 6–1
28	Italian Open	WTA 1000	9 May 2022	Clay	W	(Tunisia) Ons Jabeur (9)	7	6–2, 6–2
29	French Open	Grand Slam	23 May 2022	Clay	1R	(Ukraine) Lesia Tsurenko (Q)	119	6–2, 6–0
30	French Open	Grand Slam	23 May 2022	Clay	2R	(United States) Alison Riske	43	6–0, 6–2
31	French Open	Grand Slam	23 May 2022	Clay	3R	(Montenegro) Danka Kovinić	95	6–3, 7–5
32	French Open	Grand Slam	23 May 2022	Clay	4R	(China) Zheng Qinwen	74	6–7^{(5–7)}, 6–0, 6–2
33	French Open	Grand Slam	23 May 2022	Clay	QF	(United States) Jessica Pegula (11)	11	6–3, 6–2
34	French Open	Grand Slam	23 May 2022	Clay	SF	Daria Kasatkina (20)	20	6–2, 6–1
35	French Open	Grand Slam	23 May 2022	Clay	W	(United States) Coco Gauff (18)	23	6–1, 6–3
36	Wimbledon	Grand Slam	27 June 2022	Grass	1R	(Croatia) Jana Fett (Q)	254	6–0, 6–3
37	Wimbledon	Grand Slam	27 June 2022	Grass	2R	(Netherlands) Lesley Pattinama Kerkhove (LL)	138	6–4, 4–6, 6–3
–	Wimbledon	Grand Slam	27 June 2022	Grass	3R	(France) Alizé Cornet	37	4–6, 2–6

== Exhibition matches ==
=== Singles ===
Result	Date	Tournament	Surface	Opponent	Score
Win	Dec 2025	World Tennis Continental Cup, Shenzhen, China	Hard (i)	(Kazakhstan) Elena Rybakina	6–3, 6–3
Loss	Dec 2025	World Tennis Continental Cup, Shenzhen, China	Hard (i)	(China) Wang Xinyu	2–6, 3–6

=== Mixed doubles ===
Result	Date	Tournament	Surface	Partner	Opponents	Score
Loss	Dec 2025	World Tennis Continental Cup, Shenzhen, China	Hard (i)	(Monaco) Valentin Vacherot	Andrey Rublev (Kazakhstan) Elena Rybakina	4–6, 4–6

=== Team competitions ===
Result	Date	Tournament	Surface	Team	Partner(s)	Opp. team	Opponents	Score
Loss	Dec 2022	World Tennis League, Dubai, United Arab Emirates	Hard	Team Kites	Holger Rune; Félix Auger-Aliassime; Sania Mirza	Team Hawks	Dominic Thiem; Alexander Zverev; Elena Rybakina; Anastasia Pavlyuchenkova	25–32
Loss	Dec 2025	World Tennis Continental Cup, Shenzhen, China	Hard (i)	Europe Team	Flavio Cobolli; Valentin Vacherot; Belinda Bencic	World Team	Andrey Rublev; Zhang Zhizhen; Elena Rybakina; Wang Xinyu	7–15
