= 2022 Iga Świątek tennis season =

2022 tennis player season

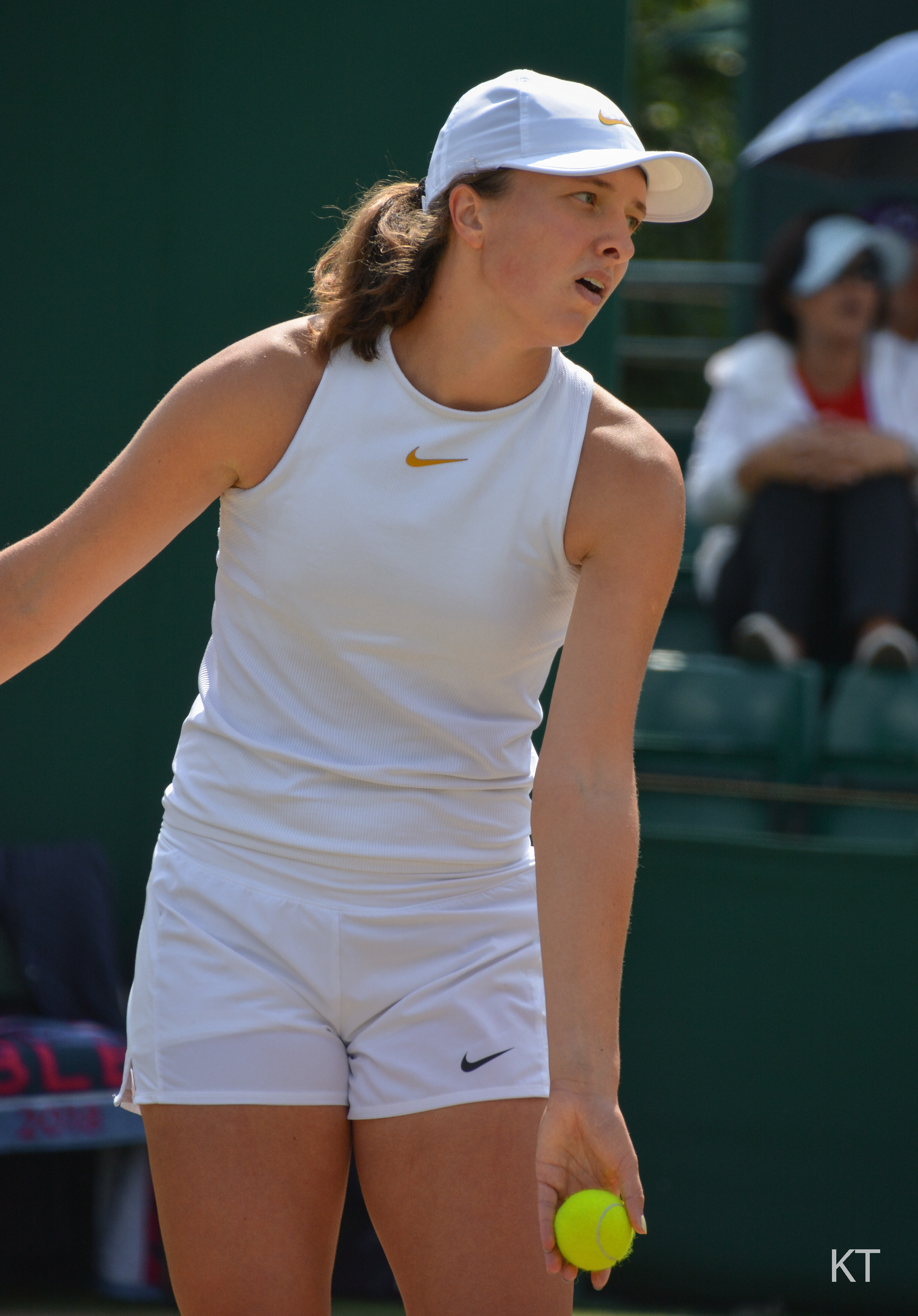
- Swiatek serving at the Wimbledon Championships
- Full name: Iga Świątek
- Country: Poland
- Calendar prize money: $9,875,525

Singles
- Season record: 67–9 (88%)
- Calendar titles: 8
- Year-end ranking: No. 1
- Ranking change from previous year: ▲8

Grand Slam & significant results
- Australian Open: SF
- French Open: W
- Wimbledon: 3R
- US Open: W
- Championships: SF

Billie Jean King Cup
- BJK Cup: RR

Injuries
- Injuries: Shoulder injury
- Last updated on: 14 November 2022.

The 2022 Iga Świątek tennis season officially began on 3 January 2022 as the start of the 2022 WTA Tour. Iga Świątek entered the season as world number 9. The season saw the Polish player become the twenty-eighth world number 1 player in singles. A 37-match win streak was accumulated during the season, the longest in the twenty-first century.

== Season summary ==
=== Early hard court season ===
Świątek started her season at the Adelaide International in January, seeded fifth. After wins against Daria Saville, Leylah Fernandez, and Victoria Azarenka, Świątek lost to Ashleigh Barty in the semifinals. She was scheduled to play at the Sydney International, seeded sixth, and her first match was scheduled to be against Emma Raducanu, but she pulled out of the tournament due to a rib injury.

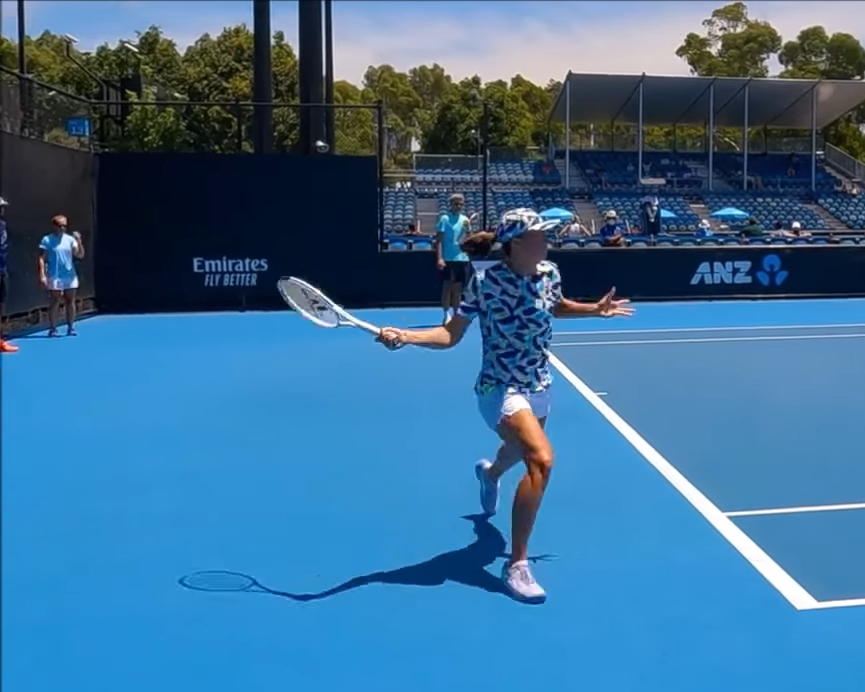
Iga Świątek practicing at the 2022 Australian Open.

Świątek entered into the Australian Open, where she was seeded seventh. She defeated qualifier Harriet Dart in the first round, Rebecca Peterson in the second round and Daria Kasatkina in the third round. All wins were in straight sets. She reached her first Australian Open quarterfinal after defeating Sorana Cîrstea in the fourth round. As of January 2022, Świątek has reached the second week of a Grand Slam at six consecutive majors, beginning with her 2020 French Open title, setting a record for the longest streak of second-week progressions. In the quarterfinal she defeated Kaia Kanepi in a match at three hours and one minute before losing to Danielle Collins in the semifinal the following day.

In February, Świątek entered into the Qatar Open, where she was seeded seventh. She defeated Viktorija Golubic and Daria Kasatkina in the second and third rounds, respectively. In the quarterfinals, she defeated top seeded Aryna Sabalenka before advancing to the semifinals where she played against Maria Sakkari, winning in straight sets. In the final, she won against fourth-seeded Anett Kontaveit, losing only two games, to claim her second WTA 1000 championship title.

=== March Sunshine Double ===
At Indian Wells, Świątek reached her third WTA 1000 final, where, as the third seed, she defeated Anhelina Kalinina, Clara Tauson and Angelique Kerber in three sets, and Madison Keys and Simona Halep, in straight sets. She defeated sixth seed Maria Sakkari, in straight sets, to win her fifth title. With the back-to-back Masters wins, Świątek reached a career-high ranking of world No. 2.

The following week, Świątek was seeded second at the Miami Open. Due to the retirement of reigning world No. 1, Ashleigh Barty, on 23 March, Świątek clinched the world No. 1 singles ranking after her second-round victory over Viktorija Golubic. The new ranking was applied on 4 April, after Barty was officially removed from the rankings. Świątek is the only Polish tennis player, male or female, to have ever held the number 1 ranking in singles, and the second Polish tennis player after Łukasz Kubot to hold a number-one ranking in singles or doubles. She then advanced to the final without dropping a set, recording victories over Madison Brengle, 14th seed Coco Gauff, 28th seed Petra Kvitová, and 16th seed Jessica Pegula. She beat Naomi Osaka in the final, becoming the fourth as well as the youngest woman (11th player overall) to complete the Sunshine Double and also the 1st woman to win the first three WTA 1000 events of the year.

=== Clay season ===
In April, Świątek participated at Stuttgart Open as the top seed after withdrawing from Charleston Open for a short time rest. She began by defeating Eva Lys and Emma Raducanu. In the semifinal, Świątek lost the first set in a tiebreak against Liudmila Samsonova but came back to win the next two sets. It was a 3 hours and 3 minutes match that not only ended up being the longest of her career then, but ended her 28-set winning streak before reaching her fourth final of the season. In the final she played against the third seed Aryna Sabalenka, winning in straight sets and claiming her fourth consecutive WTA title. However, on 27 April 2022, it was announced that Świątek pulled out of the Madrid Open due to her right shoulder injury. She said she will be taking a break to treat her arm, and will also be preparing for the upcoming Italian Open in Rome and French Open in Paris. After pulling out of Madrid, Świątek spent some time training at the Rafa Nadal Academy in Mallorca.

At the Italian Open, as the defending champion, she reached yet another WTA 1000 final, her fourth for the season, defeating Elena-Gabriela Ruse, Victoria Azarenka, Bianca Andreescu and Aryna Sabalenka. She also became the seventh player to reach two finals in Rome before turning 21. In the final, she beat Ons Jabeur in straight sets to claim her fifth consecutive WTA Tour title. She finished with a 28-match winning streak.

As world No. 1 entering the French Open, Świątek defeated Lesia Tsurenko, Alison Riske, and Danka Kovinić, all in straight sets. In the fourth round she defeated Chinese teenager Zheng Qinwen in three sets, losing the first set despite having five set points and leads in both the set and the tiebreak. Świątek made the semifinals defeating Jessica Pegula. She went one step further to reach the final by defeating Daria Kasatkina. In the final, Świątek conquered Coco Gauff and clinched her second French Open title, losing one set en route. She became only the 10th woman to win multiple French Open singles titles in the Open era. Having just turned 21, Świątek was the fourth youngest player to triumph more than once in Paris after Monica Seles, Steffi Graf, and Chris Evert who were younger. She finished the tournament with a 35-match winning streak, matching the longest unbeaten streak since Venus Williams in 2000 and becoming the 8th woman in the Open Era with 35 or more wins in a row.

=== Wimbledon and home event ===
At Wimbledon, Świątek won her first and second-round matches before losing to Alizé Cornet in straight sets in round three. This ended her 37 match win streak, the longest such streak in the 21st century.

At the Poland Open, she defeated compatriot Magdalena Fręch in the first round before winning against Gabriela Lee in the second round. In the quarterfinals she was upset in three sets by the fifth seed Caroline Garcia who went on to win the title. The defeat ended her 18-match winning streak on clay.

=== US Open series ===
Leading up to the US Open during the North American summer, Świątek early exited at Toronto and Cincinnati. She lost the third round to Beatriz Haddad Maia and Madison Keys, respectively.

Entering the US Open, Świątek defeated Jasmine Paolini, the former champion Sloane Stephens, and Lauren Davis in a row. She reached the quarterfinals for the first time at this Major and the third of the season defeating Jule Niemeier to become the first Polish woman to reach this level at this Grand Slam. Afterwards, she defeated eighth seed Jessica Pegula to reach the semifinals for the first time in Flushing Meadows, followed by a defeat of 6th seed Aryna Sabalenka and a straight-sets victory in the final over Ons Jabeur. She is the first Polish woman to win the US Open bringing her to a total of three major titles.

=== Closing tournaments ===
At Ostrava Open, she reached the final after defeating Ajla Tomljanović, Caty McNally and Ekaterina Alexandrova on the way. The win over Alexandrova was her 60th win of the season. In the final, she played the longest match of her career so far lasting 3 hours and 16 minutes against Barbora Krejčíková which she lost in three sets. The defeat also ended her ten consecutive WTA Tour finals win streak. It marked the first loss of the final in 2022 and the second one of her career.

Subsequently, Świątek played at San Diego Open, defeating Zheng Qinwen, Coco Gauff, Jessica Pegula, and the qualifier Donna Vekić in the final, which made it her eighth title of the season. Świątek became the first player since Serena Williams in 2013 to claim the most titles (8), to win the most matches (67) and to achieve the most 'bagels' in a year (22).

At the 2022 WTA Finals held in Fort Worth, Texas, she won the group stage without dropping a set defeating Daria Kasatkina, Caroline Garcia and Coco Gauff respectively. Although she lost in the semifinal to Aryna Sabalenka, she still posted a record win-loss 67–9 in 2022, the most wins in a single season since Serena Williams in 2013. She also became the first player since Serena Williams in 2013 to collect over 11,000 ranking points in a single season.

== All matches ==
Key
| W | F | SF | QF | #R | RR | Q# | P# | DNQ | A | Z# | PO | G | S | B | NMS | NTI | P | NH |

(W) winner; (F) finalist; (SF) semifinalist; (QF) quarterfinalist; (#R) rounds 4, 3, 2, 1; (RR) round-robin stage; (Q#) qualification round; (P#) preliminary round; (DNQ) did not qualify; (A) absent; (Z#) Davis/Fed Cup Zonal Group (with number indication) or (PO) play-off; (G) gold, (S) silver or (B) bronze Olympic/Paralympic medal; (NMS) not a Masters tournament; (NTI) not a Tier I tournament; (P) postponed; (NH) not held; (SR) strike rate (events won / competed); (W–L) win–loss record.
To avoid confusion and double counting, these charts are updated at the conclusion of a tournament or when the player's participation has ended.

=== Singles matches ===
| Tournament | Match | Round | Opponent | Rank | Result | Score |
|---|---|---|---|---|---|---|
| Adelaide International; Adelaide, Australia; WTA 500; Hard, outdoor; 3 January 2022 – 9 January 2022 | 1 | 1R | (Australia) Daria Saville (Q) | 421 | Win | 6–3, 6–3 |
| Adelaide International; Adelaide, Australia; WTA 500; Hard, outdoor; 3 January 2022 – 9 January 2022 | 2 | 2R | (Canada) Leylah Fernandez | 24 | Win | 6–1, 6–2 |
| Adelaide International; Adelaide, Australia; WTA 500; Hard, outdoor; 3 January 2022 – 9 January 2022 | 3 | QF | (Belarus) Victoria Azarenka | 27 | Win | 6–3, 2–6, 6–1 |
| Adelaide International; Adelaide, Australia; WTA 500; Hard, outdoor; 3 January 2022 – 9 January 2022 | 4 | SF | (Australia) Ashleigh Barty (1) | 1 | Loss | 2–6, 4–6 |
| Australian Open; Melbourne, Australia; Grand Slam; Hard, outdoor; 17 January 2022 – 30 January 2022 | 5 | 1R | (United Kingdom) Harriet Dart (Q) | 123 | Win | 6–3, 6–0 |
| Australian Open; Melbourne, Australia; Grand Slam; Hard, outdoor; 17 January 2022 – 30 January 2022 | 6 | 2R | (Sweden) Rebecca Peterson | 82 | Win | 6–2, 6–2 |
| Australian Open; Melbourne, Australia; Grand Slam; Hard, outdoor; 17 January 2022 – 30 January 2022 | 7 | 3R | (Russia) Daria Kasatkina (25) | 23 | Win | 6–2, 6–3 |
| Australian Open; Melbourne, Australia; Grand Slam; Hard, outdoor; 17 January 2022 – 30 January 2022 | 8 | 4R | (Romania) Sorana Cîrstea | 38 | Win | 5–7, 6–3, 6–3 |
| Australian Open; Melbourne, Australia; Grand Slam; Hard, outdoor; 17 January 2022 – 30 January 2022 | 9 | QF | (Estonia) Kaia Kanepi | 115 | Win | 4–6, 7–6^{(7–2)}, 6–3 |
| Australian Open; Melbourne, Australia; Grand Slam; Hard, outdoor; 17 January 2022 – 30 January 2022 | 10 | SF | (United States) Danielle Collins (27) | 30 | Loss | 4–6, 1–6 |
| Dubai Tennis Championships; Dubai, United Arab Emirates; WTA 500; Hard, outdoor; 14 February 2022 – 20 February 2022 | 11 | 1R | (Russia) Daria Kasatkina (Q) | 28 | Win | 6–1, 6–2 |
| Dubai Tennis Championships; Dubai, United Arab Emirates; WTA 500; Hard, outdoor; 14 February 2022 – 20 February 2022 | 12 | 2R | (Latvia) Jeļena Ostapenko | 21 | Loss | 6–4, 1–6, 6–7^{(4–7)} |
| Qatar Open; Doha, Qatar; WTA 1000; Hard, outdoor; 21 February 2022 – 27 February 2022 | – | 1R | Bye | | | |
| Qatar Open; Doha, Qatar; WTA 1000; Hard, outdoor; 21 February 2022 – 27 February 2022 | 13 | 2R | (Switzerland) Viktorija Golubic | 36 | Win | 6–2, 3–6, 6–2 |
| Qatar Open; Doha, Qatar; WTA 1000; Hard, outdoor; 21 February 2022 – 27 February 2022 | 14 | 3R | (Russia) Daria Kasatkina | 28 | Win | 6–3, 6–0 |
| Qatar Open; Doha, Qatar; WTA 1000; Hard, outdoor; 21 February 2022 – 27 February 2022 | 15 | QF | (Belarus) Aryna Sabalenka (1) | 2 | Win | 6–2, 6–3 |
| Qatar Open; Doha, Qatar; WTA 1000; Hard, outdoor; 21 February 2022 – 27 February 2022 | 16 | SF | (Greece) Maria Sakkari (6) | 6 | Win | 6–4, 6–3 |
| Qatar Open; Doha, Qatar; WTA 1000; Hard, outdoor; 21 February 2022 – 27 February 2022 | 17 | W | (Estonia) Anett Kontaveit (4) | 7 | Win (1) | 6–2, 6–0 |
| Indian Wells Open; Indian Wells, United States; WTA 1000; Hard, outdoor; 7 March 2022 – 20 March 2022 | – | 1R | Bye | | | |
| Indian Wells Open; Indian Wells, United States; WTA 1000; Hard, outdoor; 7 March 2022 – 20 March 2022 | 18 | 2R | (Ukraine) Anhelina Kalinina | 50 | Win | 5–7, 6–0, 6–1 |
| Indian Wells Open; Indian Wells, United States; WTA 1000; Hard, outdoor; 7 March 2022 – 20 March 2022 | 19 | 3R | (Denmark) Clara Tauson (29) | 30 | Win | 6–7^{(3–7)}, 6–2, 6–1 |
| Indian Wells Open; Indian Wells, United States; WTA 1000; Hard, outdoor; 7 March 2022 – 20 March 2022 | 20 | 3R | (Germany) Angelique Kerber (15) | 16 | Win | 4–6, 6–2, 6–3 |
| Indian Wells Open; Indian Wells, United States; WTA 1000; Hard, outdoor; 7 March 2022 – 20 March 2022 | 21 | QF | (United States) Madison Keys (25) | 29 | Win | 6–1, 6–0 |
| Indian Wells Open; Indian Wells, United States; WTA 1000; Hard, outdoor; 7 March 2022 – 20 March 2022 | 22 | SF | (Romania) Simona Halep (24) | 26 | Win | 7–6^{(8–6)}, 6–4 |
| Indian Wells Open; Indian Wells, United States; WTA 1000; Hard, outdoor; 7 March 2022 – 20 March 2022 | 23 | W | (Greece) Maria Sakkari (6) | 6 | Win (2) | 6–4, 6–1 |
| Miami Open; Miami Gardens, United States; WTA 1000; Hard, outdoor; 21 March 2022 – 3 April 2022 | – | 1R | Bye | | | |
| Miami Open; Miami Gardens, United States; WTA 1000; Hard, outdoor; 21 March 2022 – 3 April 2022 | 24 | 2R | (Switzerland) Viktorija Golubic | 42 | Win | 6–2, 6–0 |
| Miami Open; Miami Gardens, United States; WTA 1000; Hard, outdoor; 21 March 2022 – 3 April 2022 | 25 | 3R | (United States) Madison Brengle | 59 | Win | 6–0, 6–3 |
| Miami Open; Miami Gardens, United States; WTA 1000; Hard, outdoor; 21 March 2022 – 3 April 2022 | 26 | 4R | (United States) Coco Gauff (14) | 17 | Win | 6–3, 6–1 |
| Miami Open; Miami Gardens, United States; WTA 1000; Hard, outdoor; 21 March 2022 – 3 April 2022 | 27 | QF | (Czech Republic) Petra Kvitová (28) | 32 | Win | 6–3, 6–3 |
| Miami Open; Miami Gardens, United States; WTA 1000; Hard, outdoor; 21 March 2022 – 3 April 2022 | 28 | SF | (United States) Jessica Pegula (16) | 21 | Win | 6–2, 7–5 |
| Miami Open; Miami Gardens, United States; WTA 1000; Hard, outdoor; 21 March 2022 – 3 April 2022 | 29 | W | (Japan) Naomi Osaka | 77 | Win (3) | 6–4, 6–0 |
| Billie Jean King Cup qualifying round; Poland vs. Romania; Radom, Poland; Billie Jean King Cup; Hard, indoor; 15 April 2022 – 16 April 2022 | 30 | Q | (Romania) Mihaela Buzărnescu | 123 | Win | 6–1, 6–0 |
| Billie Jean King Cup qualifying round; Poland vs. Romania; Radom, Poland; Billie Jean King Cup; Hard, indoor; 15 April 2022 – 16 April 2022 | 31 | Q | (Romania) Andreea Prisăcariu | 324 | Win | 6–0, 6–0 |
| Stuttgart Open; Stuttgart, Germany; WTA 500; Clay, indoor; 18 April 2022 – 24 April 2022 | – | 1R | Bye | | | |
| Stuttgart Open; Stuttgart, Germany; WTA 500; Clay, indoor; 18 April 2022 – 24 April 2022 | 32 | 2R | (Germany) Eva Lys (Q) | 342 | Win | 6–1, 6–1 |
| Stuttgart Open; Stuttgart, Germany; WTA 500; Clay, indoor; 18 April 2022 – 24 April 2022 | 33 | QF | (United Kingdom) Emma Raducanu (8) | 12 | Win | 6–4, 6–4 |
| Stuttgart Open; Stuttgart, Germany; WTA 500; Clay, indoor; 18 April 2022 – 24 April 2022 | 34 | SF | Liudmila Samsonova (Note: Liudmila Samsonova is Russian, but she is not allowed to compete under the name or flag of her country following Russian invasion of Ukraine.) | 31 | Win | 6–7^{(4–7)}, 6–4, 7–5 |
| Stuttgart Open; Stuttgart, Germany; WTA 500; Clay, indoor; 18 April 2022 – 24 April 2022 | 35 | W | Aryna Sabalenka (Note: Aryna Sabalenka is Belarusian, but she is not allowed to compete under the name or flag of her country following Russian invasion of Ukraine.) (3) | 4 | Win (4) | 6–2, 6–2 |
| Italian Open; Rome, Italy; WTA 1000; Clay, outdoor; 9 May 2022 – 15 May 2022 | – | 1R | Bye | | | |
| Italian Open; Rome, Italy; WTA 1000; Clay, outdoor; 9 May 2022 – 15 May 2022 | 36 | 2R | (Romania) Elena-Gabriela Ruse (LL) | 57 | Win | 6–3, 6–0 |
| Italian Open; Rome, Italy; WTA 1000; Clay, outdoor; 9 May 2022 – 15 May 2022 | 37 | 3R | Victoria Azarenka (Note: Victoria Azarenka is Belarusian, but she is not allowed to compete under the name or flag of her country following Russian invasion of Ukraine.) (16) | 16 | Win | 6–4, 6–1 |
| Italian Open; Rome, Italy; WTA 1000; Clay, outdoor; 9 May 2022 – 15 May 2022 | 38 | QF | (Canada) Bianca Andreescu (PR) | 90 | Win | 7–6^{(7–2)}, 6–0 |
| Italian Open; Rome, Italy; WTA 1000; Clay, outdoor; 9 May 2022 – 15 May 2022 | 39 | SF | Aryna Sabalenka (3) | 8 | Win | 6–2, 6–1 |
| Italian Open; Rome, Italy; WTA 1000; Clay, outdoor; 9 May 2022 – 15 May 2022 | 40 | W | (Tunisia) Ons Jabeur (9) | 7 | Win (5) | 6–2, 6–2 |
| French Open; Paris, France; Grand Slam; Clay, outdoor; 22 May 2022 – 5 June 2022 | 41 | 1R | (Ukraine) Lesia Tsurenko (Q) | 119 | Win | 6–2, 6–0 |
| French Open; Paris, France; Grand Slam; Clay, outdoor; 22 May 2022 – 5 June 2022 | 42 | 2R | (United States) Alison Riske | 43 | Win | 6–0, 6–2 |
| French Open; Paris, France; Grand Slam; Clay, outdoor; 22 May 2022 – 5 June 2022 | 43 | 3R | (Montenegro) Danka Kovinić | 95 | Win | 6–3, 7–5 |
| French Open; Paris, France; Grand Slam; Clay, outdoor; 22 May 2022 – 5 June 2022 | 44 | 4R | (China) Zheng Qinwen | 74 | Win | 6–7^{(5–7)}, 6–0, 6–2 |
| French Open; Paris, France; Grand Slam; Clay, outdoor; 22 May 2022 – 5 June 2022 | 45 | QF | (United States) Jessica Pegula (11) | 11 | Win | 6–3, 6–2 |
| French Open; Paris, France; Grand Slam; Clay, outdoor; 22 May 2022 – 5 June 2022 | 46 | SF | Daria Kasatkina (Note: Daria Kasatkina is Russian, but she is not allowed to compete under the name or flag of her country following Russian invasion of Ukraine.) (20) | 20 | Win | 6–2, 6–1 |
| French Open; Paris, France; Grand Slam; Clay, outdoor; 22 May 2022 – 5 June 2022 | 47 | W | (United States) Coco Gauff (18) | 23 | Win (6) | 6–1, 6–3 |
| Wimbledon Championships; London, United Kingdom; Grand Slam; Grass, outdoor; 27 June 2022 – 10 July 2022 | 48 | 1R | (Croatia) Jana Fett (Q) | 252 | Win | 6–0, 6–3 |
| Wimbledon Championships; London, United Kingdom; Grand Slam; Grass, outdoor; 27 June 2022 – 10 July 2022 | 49 | 2R | (Netherlands) Lesley Pattinama Kerkhove (LL) | 138 | Win | 6–4, 4–6, 6–3 |
| Wimbledon Championships; London, United Kingdom; Grand Slam; Grass, outdoor; 27 June 2022 – 10 July 2022 | 50 | 3R | (France) Alizé Cornet | 37 | Loss | 4–6, 2–6 |
| Poland Open; Warsaw, Poland; WTA 250; Clay, outdoor; 25 July 2022 – 31 July 2022 | 51 | 1R | (Poland) Magdalena Fręch | 82 | Win | 6–1, 6–2 |
| Poland Open; Warsaw, Poland; WTA 250; Clay, outdoor; 25 July 2022 – 31 July 2022 | 52 | 2R | (Romania) Gabriela Lee (LL) | 146 | Win | 6–3, 6–2 |
| Poland Open; Warsaw, Poland; WTA 250; Clay, outdoor; 25 July 2022 – 31 July 2022 | 53 | QF | (France) Caroline Garcia (5) | 45 | Loss | 1–6, 6–1, 4–6 |
| Canadian Open; Toronto, Canada; WTA 1000; Hard, outdoor; 8 August 2022 – 14 August 2022 | – | 1R | Bye | | | |
| Canadian Open; Toronto, Canada; WTA 1000; Hard, outdoor; 8 August 2022 – 14 August 2022 | 54 | 2R | (Australia) Ajla Tomljanović (Q) | 72 | Win | 6–1, 6–2 |
| Canadian Open; Toronto, Canada; WTA 1000; Hard, outdoor; 8 August 2022 – 14 August 2022 | 55 | 3R | (Brazil) Beatriz Haddad Maia | 24 | Loss | 4–6, 6–3, 5–7 |
| Cincinnati Open; Mason, United States; WTA 1000; Hard, outdoor; 15 August 2022 – 21 August 2022 | – | 1R | Bye | | | |
| Cincinnati Open; Mason, United States; WTA 1000; Hard, outdoor; 15 August 2022 – 21 August 2022 | 56 | 2R | (United States) Sloane Stephens (WC) | 57 | Win | 6–4, 7–5 |
| Cincinnati Open; Mason, United States; WTA 1000; Hard, outdoor; 15 August 2022 – 21 August 2022 | 57 | 3R | (United States) Madison Keys | 24 | Loss | 3–6, 4–6 |
| US Open; New York City, United States; Grand Slam; Hard, outdoor; 29 August 2022 – 11 September 2022 | 58 | 1R | (Italy) Jasmine Paolini | 56 | Win | 6–3, 6–0 |
| US Open; New York City, United States; Grand Slam; Hard, outdoor; 29 August 2022 – 11 September 2022 | 59 | 2R | (United States) Sloane Stephens | 51 | Win | 6–3, 6–2 |
| US Open; New York City, United States; Grand Slam; Hard, outdoor; 29 August 2022 – 11 September 2022 | 60 | 3R | (United States) Lauren Davis | 105 | Win | 6–3, 6–4 |
| US Open; New York City, United States; Grand Slam; Hard, outdoor; 29 August 2022 – 11 September 2022 | 61 | 4R | (Germany) Jule Niemeier | 108 | Win | 2–6, 6–4, 6–0 |
| US Open; New York City, United States; Grand Slam; Hard, outdoor; 29 August 2022 – 11 September 2022 | 62 | QF | (United States) Jessica Pegula (8) | 8 | Win | 6–3, 7–6^{(7–4)} |
| US Open; New York City, United States; Grand Slam; Hard, outdoor; 29 August 2022 – 11 September 2022 | 63 | SF | Aryna Sabalenka (6) | 6 | Win | 3–6, 6–1, 6–4 |
| US Open; New York City, United States; Grand Slam; Hard, outdoor; 29 August 2022 – 11 September 2022 | 64 | W | (Tunisia) Ons Jabeur (5) | 5 | Win (7) | 6–2, 7–6^{(7–5)} |
| Ostrava Open; Ostrava, Czech Republic; WTA 500; Hard, indoor; 3 October 2022 – 9 October 2022 | – | 1R | Bye | | | |
| Ostrava Open; Ostrava, Czech Republic; WTA 500; Hard, indoor; 3 October 2022 – 9 October 2022 | 65 | 2R | (Australia) Ajla Tomljanović (Q) | 34 | Win | 7–5, 2–2, ret. |
| Ostrava Open; Ostrava, Czech Republic; WTA 500; Hard, indoor; 3 October 2022 – 9 October 2022 | 66 | QF | (United States) Caty McNally (Q) | 151 | Win | 6–4, 6–4 |
| Ostrava Open; Ostrava, Czech Republic; WTA 500; Hard, indoor; 3 October 2022 – 9 October 2022 | 67 | SF | Ekaterina Alexandrova (Note: Ekaterina Alexandrova is Russian, but she is not allowed to compete under the name or flag of her country following Russian invasion of Ukraine.) | 21 | Win | 7–6^{(7–5)}, 2–6, 6–4 |
| Ostrava Open; Ostrava, Czech Republic; WTA 500; Hard, indoor; 3 October 2022 – 9 October 2022 | 68 | F | (Czech Republic) Barbora Krejčíková | 23 | Loss | 7–5, 6–7^{(4–7)}, 3–6 |
| San Diego Open; San Diego, United States; WTA 500; Hard, outdoor; 10 October 2022 – 16 October 2022 | – | 1R | Bye | | | |
| San Diego Open; San Diego, United States; WTA 500; Hard, outdoor; 10 October 2022 – 16 October 2022 | 69 | 2R | (China) Zheng Qinwen (LL) | 28 | Win | 6–4, 4–6, 6–1 |
| San Diego Open; San Diego, United States; WTA 500; Hard, outdoor; 10 October 2022 – 16 October 2022 | 70 | QF | (United States) Coco Gauff (6) | 8 | Win | 6–0, 6–3 |
| San Diego Open; San Diego, United States; WTA 500; Hard, outdoor; 10 October 2022 – 16 October 2022 | 71 | SF | (United States) Jessica Pegula (4) | 6 | Win | 4–6, 6–2, 6–2 |
| San Diego Open; San Diego, United States; WTA 500; Hard, outdoor; 10 October 2022 – 16 October 2022 | 72 | W | (Croatia) Donna Vekić (Q) | 77 | Win (8) | 6–3, 3–6, 6–0 |
| WTA Finals; Fort Worth, United States; Year-end championships; Hard, indoor; 31 October 2022 – 7 November 2022 | 73 | RR | Daria Kasatkina (8) | 8 | Win | 6–2, 6–3 |
| WTA Finals; Fort Worth, United States; Year-end championships; Hard, indoor; 31 October 2022 – 7 November 2022 | 74 | RR | (France) Caroline Garcia (6) | 6 | Win | 6–3, 6–2 |
| WTA Finals; Fort Worth, United States; Year-end championships; Hard, indoor; 31 October 2022 – 7 November 2022 | 75 | RR | (United States) Coco Gauff (4) | 4 | Win | 6–3, 6–0 |
| WTA Finals; Fort Worth, United States; Year-end championships; Hard, indoor; 31 October 2022 – 7 November 2022 | 76 | SF | Aryna Sabalenka (7) | 7 | Loss | 2–6, 6–2, 1–6 |

== Tournament schedule ==
=== Singles schedule ===
| Date | Tournament | Location | Category | Surface | Previous result | Previous points | New points | Outcome |
|---|---|---|---|---|---|---|---|---|
| 3 January 2022 – 9 January 2022 | Adelaide International | Australia | WTA 500 | Hard | Winner | 470 | 185 | Semifinals lost to (Australia) Ashleigh Barty; 2–6, 4–6 |
| 17 January 2022 – 30 January 2022 | Australian Open | Australia | Grand Slam | Hard | Fourth round | 240 | 780 | Semifinals lost to (United States) Danielle Collins; 4–6, 1–6 |
| 14 February 2022 – 20 February 2022 | Dubai Tennis Championships | United Arab Emirates | WTA 500 | Hard | Third round | 105 | 55 | Second round lost to (Latvia) Jeļena Ostapenko; 6–4, 1–6, 6–7^{(4–7)} |
| 21 February 2022 – 27 February 2022 | Qatar Open | Qatar | WTA 1000 | Hard | Did not play | 0 | 900 | Winner defeated (Estonia) Anett Kontaveit; 6–2, 6–0 |
| 7 March 2022 – 20 March 2022 | Indian Wells Open | United States | WTA 1000 | Hard | Fourth round | 120 | 1000 | Winner defeated (Greece) Maria Sakkari; 6–4, 6–1 |
| 21 March 2022 – 3 April 2022 | Miami Open | United States | WTA 1000 | Hard | Third round | 65 | 1000 | Winner defeated (Japan) Naomi Osaka; 6–4, 6–0 |
| 18 April 2022 – 24 April 2022 | Stuttgart Open | Germany | WTA 500 | Clay (i) | Did not play | 0 | 470 | Winner defeated Aryna Sabalenka; 6–2, 6–2 |
| 9 May 2022 – 15 May 2022 | Italian Open | Italy | WTA 1000 | Clay | Winner | 900 | 900 | Winner defeated (Tunisia) Ons Jabeur; 6–2, 6–2 |
| 22 May 2022 – 5 June 2022 | French Open | France | Grand Slam | Clay | Quarterfinals | 430 | 2000 | Winner defeated (United States) Coco Gauff; 6–1, 6–3 |
| 27 June 2022 – 10 July 2022 | Wimbledon Championships | United Kingdom | Grand Slam | Grass | Fourth round | 240 | —N/a (Note: Following the All England Lawn Tennis and Croquet Club's decision to ban Russian and Belarusian players from the 2022 Wimbledon Championships due to the Russian invasion of Ukraine, the ITF, ATP, and WTA stripped the event of ranking points.) | Third round lost to (France) Alizé Cornet; 4–6, 2–6 |
| 25 July 2022 – 31 July 2022 | Poland Open | Poland | WTA 250 | Clay | Did not play | 0 | 60 | Quarterfinals lost to (France) Caroline Garcia; 1–6, 6–1, 4–6 |
| 8 August 2022 – 14 August 2022 | Canadian Open | Canada | WTA 1000 | Hard | Did not play | 0 | 105 | Third round lost to (Brazil) Beatriz Haddad Maia; 4–6, 6–3, 5–7 |
| 15 August 2022 – 21 August 2022 | Cincinnati Open | United States | WTA 1000 | Hard | Second round | 1 | 105 | Third round lost to (United States) Madison Keys; 3–6, 4–6 |
| 29 August 2022 – 11 September 2022 | US Open | United States | Grand Slam | Hard | Fourth round | 240 | 2000 | Winner defeated (Tunisia) Ons Jabeur; 6–2, 7–6^{(7–5)} |
| 3 October 2022 – 9 October 2022 | Ostrava Open | Czech Republic | WTA 500 | Hard (i) | Semi-finals | 185 | 305 | Final lost to (Czech Republic) Barbora Krejčíková; 7–5, 6–7^{(4–7)}, 3–6 |
| 10 October 2022 – 16 October 2022 | San Diego Open | United States | WTA 500 | Hard | Not held | 0 | 470 | Winner defeated (Croatia) Donna Vekić; 6–3, 3–6, 6–0 |
| 31 October 2022 – 7 November 2022 | WTA Finals | United States | WTA Finals | Hard (i) | Round robin | 500 | 750 | Semifinals lost to Aryna Sabalenka; 2–6, 6–2, 1–6 |
| Total year-end points | | | | | | | 11085 | |

== Yearly records ==
=== Top 10 wins ===
==== Singles ====
| # | Opponent | Rank | Tournament | Surface | Round | Score | IŚR |
|---|---|---|---|---|---|---|---|
| 1. | (Belarus) Aryna Sabalenka | No. 2 | Qatar Open | Hard | Quarterfinals | 6–2, 6–3 | No. 8 |
| 2. | (Greece) Maria Sakkari | No. 6 | Qatar Open | Hard | Semifinals | 6–4, 6–3 | No. 8 |
| 3. | (Estonia) Anett Kontaveit | No. 7 | Qatar Open | Hard | Final | 6–2, 6–0 | No. 8 |
| 4. | (Greece) Maria Sakkari | No. 6 | Indian Wells Open, United States | Hard | Final | 6–4, 6–1 | No. 4 |
| 5. | Aryna Sabalenka | No. 4 | Stuttgart Open, Germany | Clay (i) | Final | 6–2, 6–2 | No. 1 |
| 6. | Aryna Sabalenka | No. 8 | Italian Open | Clay | Semifinals | 6–2, 6–1 | No. 1 |
| 7. | (Tunisia) Ons Jabeur | No. 7 | Italian Open | Clay | Final | 6–2, 6–2 | No. 1 |
| 8. | (United States) Jessica Pegula | No. 8 | US Open | Hard | Quarterfinals | 6–3, 7–6^{(7–4)} | No. 1 |
| 9. | Aryna Sabalenka | No. 6 | US Open | Hard | Semifinals | 3–6, 6–1, 6–4 | No. 1 |
| 10. | (Tunisia) Ons Jabeur | No. 5 | US Open | Hard | Final | 6–2, 7–6^{(7–5)} | No. 1 |
| 11. | (United States) Coco Gauff | No. 8 | San Diego Open, United States | Hard | Quarterfinals | 6–0, 6–3 | No. 1 |
| 12. | (United States) Jessica Pegula | No. 6 | San Diego Open, United States | Hard | Semifinals | 4–6, 6–2, 6–2 | No. 1 |
| 13. | Daria Kasatkina | No. 8 | WTA Finals, United States | Hard (i) | Round robin | 6–2, 6–3 | No. 1 |
| 14. | (France) Caroline Garcia | No. 6 | WTA Finals, United States | Hard (i) | Round robin | 6–3, 6–2 | No. 1 |
| 15. | (United States) Coco Gauff | No. 4 | WTA Finals, United States | Hard (i) | Round robin | 6–3, 6–0 | No. 1 |

=== Finals ===
==== Singles: 9 (8 titles, 1 runner-up) ====
| Legend Grand Slam tournaments (2–0) WTA Tour Championships (0–0) WTA Elite Trophy (0–0) WTA 1000 (4–0) WTA 500 (2–1) WTA 250 (0–0) | Finals by surface Hard (5–1) Clay (3–0) Grass (0–0) | Finals by setting Outdoor (7–0) Indoor (1–1) |

| Result | W–L | Date | Tournament | Tier | Surface | Opponent | Score |
|---|---|---|---|---|---|---|---|
| Win | 1–0 | Feb 2022 | Qatar Open | WTA 1000 | Hard | (Estonia) Anett Kontaveit | 6–2, 6–0 |
| Win | 2–0 | Mar 2022 | Indian Wells Open, United States | WTA 1000 | Hard | (Greece) Maria Sakkari | 6–4, 6–1 |
| Win | 3–0 | Apr 2022 | Miami Open, United States | WTA 1000 | Hard | (Japan) Naomi Osaka | 6–4, 6–0 |
| Win | 4–0 | Apr 2022 | Stuttgart Open, Germany | WTA 500 | Clay (i) | Aryna Sabalenka | 6–2, 6–2 |
| Win | 5–0 | May 2022 | Italian Open | WTA 1000 | Clay | (Tunisia) Ons Jabeur | 6–2, 6–2 |
| Win | 6–0 | Jun 2022 | French Open | Grand Slam | Clay | (United States) Coco Gauff | 6–1, 6–3 |
| Win | 7–0 | Sep 2022 | US Open | Grand Slam | Hard | (Tunisia) Ons Jabeur | 6–2, 7–6^{(7–5)} |
| Loss | 7–1 | Oct 2022 | Ostrava Open, Czech Republic | WTA 500 | Hard (i) | (Czech Republic) Barbora Krejčíková | 7–5, 6–7^{(4–7)}, 3–6 |
| Win | 8–1 | Oct 2022 | San Diego Open, United States | WTA 500 | Hard | (Croatia) Donna Vekić | 6–3, 3–6, 6–0 |

=== Earnings ===
| # | Tournament | Singles Prize money | Doubles Prize money | Year-to-date |
|---|---|---|---|---|
| 1. | Adelaide International | $39,000 | $0 | $39,000 |
| 2. | Australian Open | $673,420 | $0 | $712,420 |
| 3. | Dubai Tennis Championships | $9,500 | $0 | $721,920 |
| 4. | Qatar Open | $380,000 | $0 | $1,101,920 |
| 5. | Indian Wells Open | $1,231,245 | $0 | $2,333,165 |
| 6. | Miami Open | $1,231,245 | $0 | $3,564,410 |
| 7. | Stuttgart Open | $93,823 | $0 | $3,658,233 |
| 8. | Italian Open | $412,000 | $0 | $4,070,233 |
| 9. | French Open | $2,326,586 | $0 | $6,396,819 |
| 10. | Wimbledon Championships | $154,816 | $0 | $6,551,635 |
| 11. | Poland Open | $6,200 | $0 | $6,557,835 |
| 12. | Canadian Open | $30,660 | $0 | $6,588,495 |
| 13. | Cincinnati Open | $28,730 | $0 | $6,617,225 |
| 14. | US Open | $2,600,000 | $0 | $9,217,225 |
| 15. | Ostrava Open | $71,960 | $0 | $9,289,185 |
| 16. | San Diego Open | $116,340 | $0 | $9,405,525 |
| 17. | WTA Finals | $470,000 | $0 | $9,875,525 |
| Total prize money | | $9,875,525 | $0 | $9,875,525 |
