= 2022 Porsche Tennis Grand Prix – Doubles =

Doubles
- 2022 Porsche Tennis Grand Prix

Final
- Champions: (United States) Desirae Krawczyk (Netherlands) Demi Schuurs
- Runners-up: (United States) Coco Gauff (China) Zhang Shuai
- Score: 6–3, 6–4

Details
- Draw: 16
- Seeds: 4

Events
Singles	Doubles
- Porsche Tennis Grand Prix

Desirae Krawczyk and Demi Schuurs defeated Coco Gauff and Zhang Shuai in the final, 6–3, 6–4 to win the doubles tennis title at the 2022 Women's Stuttgart Open.

Ashleigh Barty and Jennifer Brady were the reigning champions, but they chose not to participate. Barty announced her retirement from professional tennis in March 2022.

== Seeds ==
1. (United States) Coco Gauff / (China) Zhang Shuai (final)
2. (United States) Desirae Krawczyk / (Netherlands) Demi Schuurs (champions)
3. (Ukraine) Lyudmyla Kichenok / (Australia) Storm Sanders (quarterfinals)
4. (Japan) Shuko Aoyama / (Chinese Taipei) Chan Hao-ching (semifinals)

== Draw ==
Key

- Q = Qualifier
- WC = Wild card
- LL = Lucky loser
- Alt = Alternate
- ITF = ITF entry
- PR = Protected ranking
- SR = Special ranking
- SE = Special exempt
- JE = Junior exempt
- JR = Junior Accelerator Programme entrant
- CO = College Accelerator Programme entrant
- NG = Next Gen Accelerator Program entrant
- w/o = Walkover
- r = Retired
- d = Defaulted

=== Draw ===
First Round
1	(United States) C Gauff (China) S Zhang	6	6
PR	(Ukraine) N Kichenok (Australia) An Rodionova	1	1
(Spain) P Badosa; A Sabalenka	7	7
(Tunisia) O Jabeur (Australia) E Perez	5	5
4	(Japan) S Aoyama (Chinese Taipei) H-c Chan	6	6
(Romania) A Mitu (United States) S Santamaria	3	1
WC	(Germany) J Niemeier (Germany) N Schunk	3	3
(Poland) A Rosolska (New Zealand) E Routliffe	6	6
Alt	(Spain) C Bucșa (Slovenia) T Zidanšek	6	6
(Germany) V Heisen (Hungary) P Udvardy	4	4
(Thailand) P Plipuech (Indonesia) J Rompies	4	6^{1}
3	(Ukraine) L Kichenok (Australia) S Sanders	6	7^{7}
(Norway) U Eikeri; A Panova	3	1
(Switzerland) V Golubic (Czech Republic) M Vondroušová	6	6
(Japan) E Hozumi (Japan) M Ninomiya	4	0
2	(United States) D Krawczyk (Netherlands) D Schuurs	6	6

Quarterfinals
1	(United States) C Gauff (China) S Zhang	w/o
(Spain) P Badosa; A Sabalenka
4	(Japan) S Aoyama (Chinese Taipei) H-c Chan	6	6
(Poland) A Rosolska (New Zealand) E Routliffe	4	4
Alt	(Spain) C Bucșa (Slovenia) T Zidanšek	6	3	[12]
3	(Ukraine) L Kichenok (Australia) S Sanders	3	6	[10]
(Switzerland) V Golubic (Czech Republic) M Vondroušová	3	2
2	(United States) D Krawczyk (Netherlands) D Schuurs	6	6

Semifinals
1	(United States) C Gauff (China) S Zhang	6	6
4	(Japan) S Aoyama (Chinese Taipei) H-c Chan	2	3
Alt	(Spain) C Bucșa (Slovenia) T Zidanšek	6^{4}	6	[7]
2	(United States) D Krawczyk (Netherlands) D Schuurs	7^{7}	1	[10]

Final
1	(United States) C Gauff (China) S Zhang	3	4
2	(United States) D Krawczyk (Netherlands) D Schuurs	6	6
