= 2022 Wimbledon Championships – Women's singles =

Tennis championship

Ladies' singles
- 2022 Wimbledon Championships

Final
- Champion: (Kazakhstan) Elena Rybakina
- Runner-up: (Tunisia) Ons Jabeur
- Score: 3–6, 6–2, 6–2

Details
- Draw: 128 (16 Q / 7 WC)
- Seeds: 32

Events
Singles	men	women		boys	girls
Doubles	men	women	mixed	boys	girls
WC Singles	men	women	quad
WC Doubles	men	women	quad
14&U Singles	boys	girls
Legends	men	women	mixed
- Wimbledon Championships

Elena Rybakina defeated Ons Jabeur in the final, 3–6, 6–2, 6–2 to win the ladies' singles tennis title at the 2022 Wimbledon Championships. It was her first major title, third WTA Tour–level title overall, and first career title on grass courts. Rybakina was the first Kazakhstani (Note: Rybakina previously represented Russia before switching her nationality to Kazakhstan in 2018.) to win a major, and the third player representing an Asian nation to win a major after Li Na and Naomi Osaka and first Asian to win the Wimbledon. She was the first player to win from a set down in the final since Amélie Mauresmo in 2006. Jabeur was the first Arab to reach a major singles final, the first African woman to do so in the Open Era, and the first African woman to do so not representing South Africa. (Note: The only other African women to contest major singles finals were South African: Irene Bowder Peacock at the 1927 French Championships, Renée Schuurman at the 1959 Australian Championships and Sandra Reynolds at the 1960 Wimbledon Championships.) This marked the first time since 2009 that both finalists represented non-European nations.

Ashleigh Barty was the reigning champion, but she retired from professional tennis in March 2022.

World No. 1 Iga Świątek's win streak of 37 matches (dating back to Qatar in February) ended when she was defeated by Alizé Cornet in the third round. It was just the fourth loss of Świątek's season; her 37-match winning streak is the longest of the 21st century, and tied for the 12th-longest in the Open Era.

For the second time in her career, Cornet defeated the incumbent world No. 1 in the third round at Wimbledon; she had defeated Serena Williams at that stage in 2014. By making her 62nd consecutive major main draw appearance, Cornet tied Ai Sugiyama's all-time record for women.

Williams received a wild card to play in the tournament, making her comeback to the sport after a year away due to a right hamstring injury; she was defeated in the first round by Harmony Tan. This marked the final Wimbledon appearances for 2017 and 2019 champions and former world No. 1s Garbiñe Muguruza and Simona Halep; they lost to Rybakina in the semifinals and Greet Minnen in the first round, respectively.

This was the first edition of Wimbledon to feature a champions tiebreak, a 10-point tiebreak when the score reaches six games all in the third set, and the third edition to feature a final-set tiebreak rule. (Note: The previous tie-break rule was a 7-point tie-break, when the score reaches twelve games all in the third set.) The first women's singles main draw match of the tournament to feature the 10-point tiebreak was the first round match between Caroline Garcia and Yuriko Miyazaki, with Garcia emerging victorious.

== Seeds ==
All seeds per WTA rankings.

1. (Poland) Iga Świątek (third round)
2. (Estonia) Anett Kontaveit (second round)
3. (Tunisia) Ons Jabeur (final)
4. (Spain) Paula Badosa (fourth round)
5. (Greece) Maria Sakkari (third round)
6. (Czech Republic) Karolína Plíšková (second round)
7. (United States) Danielle Collins (first round)
8. (United States) Jessica Pegula (third round)
9. (Spain) Garbiñe Muguruza (first round)
10. (United Kingdom) Emma Raducanu (second round)
11. (United States) Coco Gauff (third round)
12. (Latvia) Jeļena Ostapenko (fourth round)
13. (Czech Republic) Barbora Krejčíková (third round)
14. (Switzerland) Belinda Bencic (first round)
15. (Germany) Angelique Kerber (third round)
16. (Romania) Simona Halep (semifinals)
17. (Kazakhstan) Elena Rybakina (champion)
18. (Switzerland) Jil Teichmann (first round)
19. (United States) Madison Keys (withdrew)
20. (United States) Amanda Anisimova (quarterfinals)
21. (Italy) Camila Giorgi (first round)
22. (Italy) Martina Trevisan (first round)
23. (Brazil) Beatriz Haddad Maia (first round)
24. (Belgium) Elise Mertens (fourth round)
25. (Czech Republic) Petra Kvitová (third round)
26. (Romania) Sorana Cîrstea (second round)
27. (Kazakhstan) Yulia Putintseva (first round)
28. (United States) Alison Riske-Amritraj (third round)
29. (Ukraine) Anhelina Kalinina (second round)
30. (United States) Shelby Rogers (first round)
31. (Estonia) Kaia Kanepi (first round)
32. (Spain) Sara Sorribes Tormo (second round)
33. (China) Zhang Shuai (third round)

Click on the seed number of a player to go to their draw section.

== Draw ==
Key

- Q = Qualifier
- WC = Wild card
- LL = Lucky loser
- Alt = Alternate
- ITF = ITF entry
- PR = Protected ranking
- SR = Special ranking
- SE = Special exempt
- JE = Junior exempt
- JR = Junior Accelerator Programme entrant
- CO = College Accelerator Programme entrant
- NG = Next Gen Accelerator Program entrant
- w/o = Walkover
- r = Retired
- d = Defaulted

=== Finals ===
Quarterfinals
(Australia) Ajla Tomljanović	6	2	3
17	(Kazakhstan) Elena Rybakina	4	6	6
16	(Romania) Simona Halep	6	6
20	(United States) Amanda Anisimova	2	4
(Czech Republic) Marie Bouzková	6	1	1
3	(Tunisia) Ons Jabeur	3	6	6
(Germany) Tatjana Maria	4	6	7
(Germany) Jule Niemeier	6	2	5

Semifinals
17	(Kazakhstan) Elena Rybakina	6	6
16	(Romania) Simona Halep	3	3
3	(Tunisia) Ons Jabeur	6	3	6
(Germany) Tatjana Maria	2	6	1

Final
17	(Kazakhstan) Elena Rybakina	3	6	6
3	(Tunisia) Ons Jabeur	6	2	2

=== Top half ===
==== Section 1 ====
First round
1	(Poland) I Świątek	6	6
Q	(Croatia) J Fett	0	3
WC	(United Kingdom) S Kartal	4	6	1
LL	(Netherlands) L Pattinama Kerkhove	6	3	6
(United States) C Liu	7	6
(Spain) N Párrizas Díaz	5	3
(France) A Cornet	6	7^{7}
27	(Kazakhstan) Y Putintseva	3	6^{5}
18	(Switzerland) J Teichmann	2	3
(Australia) A Tomljanović	6	6
Q	(United States) C Harrison	6	6
(Netherlands) A Rus	1	4
(Switzerland) V Golubic	6	6
(Germany) A Petkovic	4	3
(Belgium) M Zanevska	6^{4}	3
13	(Czech Republic) B Krejčíková	7^{7}	6

Second round
1	(Poland) I Świątek	6	4	6
LL	(Netherlands) L Pattinama Kerkhove	4	6	3
(United States) C Liu	3	3
(France) A Cornet	6	6
(Australia) A Tomljanović	6	6
Q	(United States) C Harrison	2	2
(Switzerland) V Golubic	3	4
13	(Czech Republic) B Krejčíková	6	6

Third round
1	(Poland) I Świątek	4	2
(France) A Cornet	6	6
(Australia) A Tomljanović	2	6	6
13	(Czech Republic) B Krejčíková	6	4	3

Fourth round
(France) A Cornet	6	4	3
(Australia) A Tomljanović	4	6	6

==== Section 2 ====
First round
9	(Spain) G Muguruza	4	0
(Belgium) G Minnen	6	6
(China) Q Zheng	7^{7}	7
(United States) S Stephens	6^{1}	5
Q	(United States) E Bektas	1	3
(Canada) B Andreescu	6	6
LL	(United States) C Vandeweghe	6^{2}	5
17	(Kazakhstan) E Rybakina	7^{7}	7
30	(United States) S Rogers	2	6^{5}
(Croatia) P Martić	6	7^{7}
(Slovakia) K Kučová	7	6
(Brazil) L Pigossi	5	0
(Spain) R Masarova	1	4
(United Kingdom) H Dart	6	6
(Croatia) D Vekić	3	6^{2}
8	(United States) J Pegula	6	7^{7}

Second round
(Belgium) G Minnen	4	1
(China) Q Zheng	6	6
(Canada) B Andreescu	4	6^{5}
17	(Kazakhstan) E Rybakina	6	7^{7}
(Croatia) P Martić	7^{7}	6
(Slovakia) K Kučová	6^{4}	3
(United Kingdom) H Dart	6	3	1
8	(United States) J Pegula	4	6	6

Third round
(China) Q Zheng	6^{4}	5
17	(Kazakhstan) E Rybakina	7^{7}	7
(Croatia) P Martić	6	7^{7}
8	(United States) J Pegula	2	6^{5}

Fourth round
17	(Kazakhstan) E Rybakina	7	6
(Croatia) P Martić	5	3

==== Section 3 ====
First round
4	(Spain) P Badosa	6	6
Q	(United States) L Chirico	2	1
(Romania) I Bara	6	6
(France) C Paquet	2	4
(Romania) A Bogdan	6	6
(Ukraine) D Yastremska	2	2
(Italy) J Paolini	6	4	2
25	(Czech Republic) P Kvitová	2	6	6
21	(Italy) C Giorgi	6^{4}	1
(Poland) M Fręch	7^{7}	6
(Sweden) R Peterson	5	6	3
(Slovakia) AK Schmiedlová	7	0	6
PR	(Belgium) K Flipkens	7	6
Q	(Australia) J Fourlis	5	2
(Czech Republic) K Muchová	3	2
16	(Romania) S Halep	6	6

Second round
4	(Spain) P Badosa	6	6
(Romania) I Bara	3	2
(Romania) A Bogdan	1	6^{5}
25	(Czech Republic) P Kvitová	6	7^{7}
(Poland) M Fręch	6	6
(Slovakia) AK Schmiedlová	4	4
PR	(Belgium) K Flipkens	5	4
16	(Romania) S Halep	7	6

Third round
4	(Spain) P Badosa	7	7^{7}
25	(Czech Republic) P Kvitová	5	6^{4}
(Poland) M Fręch	4	1
16	(Romania) S Halep	6	6

Fourth round
4	(Spain) P Badosa	1	2
16	(Romania) S Halep	6	6

==== Section 4 ====
First round
11	(United States) C Gauff	2	6	7
(Romania) E-G Ruse	6	3	5
(Romania) M Buzărnescu	6	6
Q	(Germany) N Schunk	4	2
(United States) M Brengle	2	5
(United States) L Davis	6	7
LL	(China) Y Yuan	3	4
20	(United States) A Anisimova	6	6
32	(Spain) S Sorribes Tormo	6	6
Q	(United States) C McHale	2	1
WC	(United States) S Williams	5	6	6^{7}
(France) H Tan	7	1	7^{10}
(France) C Burel	5	3
WC	(United Kingdom) K Boulter	7	6
(Czech Republic) T Martincová	6^{1}	5
6	(Czech Republic) Ka Plíšková	7^{7}	7

Second round
11	(United States) C Gauff	6	6
(Romania) M Buzărnescu	2	3
(United States) L Davis	6	3	4
20	(United States) A Anisimova	2	6	6
32	(Spain) S Sorribes Tormo	3	4
(France) H Tan	6	6
WC	(United Kingdom) K Boulter	3	7^{7}	6
6	(Czech Republic) Ka Plíšková	6	6^{4}	4

Third round
11	(United States) C Gauff	7^{7}	2	1
20	(United States) A Anisimova	6^{4}	6	6
(France) H Tan	6	6
WC	(United Kingdom) K Boulter	1	1

Fourth round
20	(United States) A Anisimova	6	6
(France) H Tan	2	3

=== Bottom half ===
==== Section 5 ====
First round
7	(United States) D Collins	7	4	4
(Czech Republic) M Bouzková	5	6	6
(Italy) L Bronzetti	1	4
(United States) A Li	6	6
(Czech Republic) K Siniaková	0	5
Q	(Poland) M Chwalińska	6	7
(Switzerland) Y In-Albon	2	4
28	(United States) A Riske-Amritraj	6	6
33	(China) S Zhang	6	6
(Japan) M Doi	4	0
(Ukraine) M Kostyuk	4	6	6
WC	(United Kingdom) K Swan	6	4	4
(France) C Garcia	4	6	7^{10}
WC	(United Kingdom) Y Miyazaki	6	1	6^{4}
(Belgium) A Van Uytvanck	4	4
10	(United Kingdom) E Raducanu	6	6

Second round
(Czech Republic) M Bouzková	6	6
(United States) A Li	0	3
Q	(Poland) M Chwalińska	6	1	0
28	(United States) A Riske-Amritraj	3	6	6
33	(China) S Zhang	7^{8}	6
(Ukraine) M Kostyuk	6^{6}	2
(France) C Garcia	6	6
10	(United Kingdom) E Raducanu	3	3

Third round
(Czech Republic) M Bouzková	6	6
28	(United States) A Riske-Amritraj	2	3
33	(China) S Zhang	6^{3}	6^{5}
(France) C Garcia	7^{7}	7^{7}

Fourth round
(Czech Republic) M Bouzková	7	6
(France) C Garcia	5	2

==== Section 6 ====
First round
15	(Germany) A Kerber	6	7
(France) K Mladenovic	0	5
(Poland) M Linette	6	6
Q	(Mexico) F Contreras Gómez	1	4
(Slovenia) T Zidanšek	4	6^{1}
(Hungary) P Udvardy	6	7^{7}
(Colombia) C Osorio	6	2	2^{r}
24	(Belgium) E Mertens	1	6	4
31	(Estonia) K Kanepi	4	4
(France) D Parry	6	6
(Denmark) C Tauson	1^{r}
Q	(Japan) M Hontama	4
(Canada) R Marino	4	6	5
Q	(Poland) K Kawa	6	3	7
Q	(Sweden) M Björklund	1	3
3	(Tunisia) O Jabeur	6	6

Second round
15	(Germany) A Kerber	6	6
(Poland) M Linette	3	3
(Hungary) P Udvardy	6	6^{5}	5
24	(Belgium) E Mertens	3	7^{7}	7
(France) D Parry	6	6
Q	(Japan) M Hontama	3	2
Q	(Poland) K Kawa	4	0
3	(Tunisia) O Jabeur	6	6

Third round
15	(Germany) A Kerber	4	5
24	(Belgium) E Mertens	6	7
(France) D Parry	2	3
3	(Tunisia) O Jabeur	6	6

Fourth round
24	(Belgium) E Mertens	6^{9}	4
3	(Tunisia) O Jabeur	7^{11}	6

==== Section 7 ====
First round
5	(Greece) M Sakkari	6	6
Q	(Australia) Z Hives	1	4
WC	(Australia) D Saville	5	6	5
(Bulgaria) V Tomova	7	3	7
Q	(Australia) A Sharma	6	3	4
(Germany) T Maria	4	6	6
(Serbia) A Krunić	6^{5}	6^{1}
26	(Romania) S Cîrstea	7^{7}	7^{7}
22	(Italy) M Trevisan	2	0
PR	(Italy) E Cocciaretto	6	6
(Georgia (country)) E Gorgodze	4	1
(Romania) I-C Begu	6	6
Q	(Belgium) Y Wickmayer	6	6
(China) L Zhu	4	2
(France) O Dodin	4	4
12	(Latvia) J Ostapenko	6	6

Second round
5	(Greece) M Sakkari	6	6
(Bulgaria) V Tomova	4	3
(Germany) T Maria	6	1	7
26	(Romania) S Cîrstea	3	6	5
PR	(Italy) E Cocciaretto	4	4
(Romania) I-C Begu	6	6
Q	(Belgium) Y Wickmayer	2	2
12	(Latvia) J Ostapenko	6	6

Third round
5	(Greece) M Sakkari	3	5
(Germany) T Maria	6	7
(Romania) I-C Begu	6	1	1
12	(Latvia) J Ostapenko	3	6	6

Fourth round
(Germany) T Maria	5	7	7
12	(Latvia) J Ostapenko	7	5	5

==== Section 8 ====
First round
14	(Switzerland) B Bencic	4	7	2
(China) Q Wang	6	5	6
(Germany) T Korpatsch	7^{9}	5	2
(United Kingdom) H Watson	6^{7}	7	6
Q	(Australia) M Inglis	7	3	4
(Hungary) D Gálfi	5	6	6
(Slovenia) K Juvan	6	4	6
23	(Brazil) B Haddad Maia	4	6	2
29	(Ukraine) A Kalinina	4	6	6
(Hungary) A Bondár	6	2	4
WC	(United Kingdom) J Burrage	2	3
(Ukraine) L Tsurenko	6	6
(Germany) J Niemeier	6	6
(China) Xiy Wang	1	4
(United States) B Pera	5	1
2	(Estonia) A Kontaveit	7	6

Second round
(China) Q Wang	5	4
(United Kingdom) H Watson	7	6
(Hungary) D Gálfi	5	3
(Slovenia) K Juvan	7	6
29	(Ukraine) A Kalinina	6	4	3
(Ukraine) L Tsurenko	3	6	6
(Germany) J Niemeier	6	6
2	(Estonia) A Kontaveit	4	0

Third round
(United Kingdom) H Watson	7^{8}	6
(Slovenia) K Juvan	6^{6}	2
(Ukraine) L Tsurenko	4	6	3
(Germany) J Niemeier	6	3	6

Fourth round
(United Kingdom) H Watson	2	4
(Germany) J Niemeier	6	6

== Championship match statistics ==
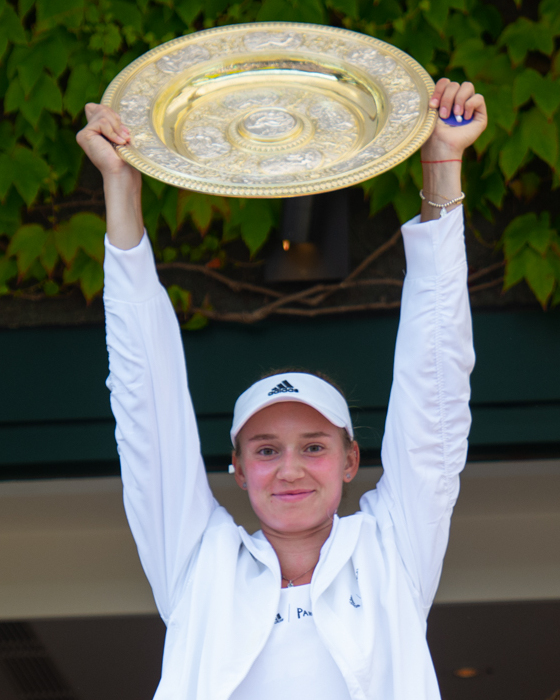
Rybakina with the Venus Rosewater Dish after the match.

Category	(Kazakhstan) Rybakina	(Tunisia) Jabeur
1st serve %	56/94 (60%)	39/72 (54%)
1st serve points won	35 of 56 = 63%	27 of 39 = 69%
2nd serve points won	22 of 38 = 58%	16 of 33 = 48%
Total service points won	57 of 94 = 60.64%	43 of 72 = 59.72%
Aces	4	4
Double faults	3	1
Winners	29	17
Unforced errors	33	24
Net points won	17 of 36 = 47%	7 of 14 = 50%
Break points converted	4 of 6 = 67%	2 of 11 = 18%
Return points won	29 of 72 = 40%	37 of 94 = 39%
Total points won	86	80

== Seeded players ==
The following are the seeded players. Seedings are based on WTA rankings as of 20 June 2022. Rankings and points are as before 27 June 2021.

The WTA decided not to award ranking points for the 2022 tournament in response to the All England Club's decision to ban Russian and Belarusian players from participating. Points dropping from the 2021 tournament will accordingly be replaced by the player's next best result, regardless of her performance at Wimbledon in 2022. Note that 2021 points were mandatory for WTA players, unlike for ATP players, who were subject to a different rankings adjustment system.

Seed	Rank	Player	Points before	Points defending	Next best result^{†}	Points after	Status
1	1	(Poland) Iga Świątek	8,576	240	0	8,336	Third round lost to (France) Alizé Cornet
2	3	(Estonia) Anett Kontaveit	4,306	10	30	4,326	Second round lost to (Germany) Jule Niemeier
3	2	(Tunisia) Ons Jabeur	4,340	430	100	4,010	Final lost to (Kazakhstan) Elena Rybakina [17]
4	4	(Spain) Paula Badosa	4,245	240	25	4,030	Fourth round lost to (Romania) Simona Halep [16]
5	5	(Greece) Maria Sakkari	4,205	70	55	4,190	Third round lost to (Germany) Tatjana Maria
6	7	(Czech Republic) Karolína Plíšková	3,777	1,300	0	2,477	Second round lost to (United Kingdom) Katie Boulter [WC]
7	8	(United States) Danielle Collins	3,255	70+60	5+1	3,131	First round lost to (Czech Republic) Marie Bouzková
8	9	(United States) Jessica Pegula	3,156	70	1	3,087	Third round lost to (Croatia) Petra Martić
9	10	(Spain) Garbiñe Muguruza	3,015	130	1	2,886	First round lost to (Belgium) Greet Minnen
10	11	(United Kingdom) Emma Raducanu	2,952	240	5	2,717	Second round lost to (France) Caroline Garcia
11	12	(United States) Coco Gauff	2,886	240	1	2,647	Third round lost to (United States) Amanda Anisimova [20]
12	17	(Latvia) Jeļena Ostapenko	2,431	130	1	2,302	Fourth round lost to (Germany) Tatjana Maria
13	14	(Czech Republic) Barbora Krejčiková	2,593	240	0	2,353	Third round lost to (Australia) Ajla Tomljanović
14	16	(Switzerland) Belinda Bencic	2,585	10	60	2,635	First round lost to (China) Wang Qiang
15	19	(Germany) Angelique Kerber	2,199	780	0	1,419	Third round lost to (Belgium) Elise Mertens [24]
16	18	(Romania) Simona Halep	2,315	0	100	2,415	Semifinals lost to (Kazakhstan) Elena Rybakina [17]
17	23	(Kazakhstan) Elena Rybakina	1,990	240	55	1,805	Champion, defeated (Tunisia) Ons Jabeur [3]
18	22	(Switzerland) Jil Teichmann	2,023	10	1	2,014	First round lost to (Australia) Ajla Tomljanović
~~19~~	~~24~~	~~(United States) Madison Keys~~	1,964	240	1	1,725	Withdrew due to abdominal injury
20	25	(United States) Amanda Anisimova	1,840	10	1	1,831	Quarterfinals lost to (Romania) Simona Halep [16]
21	27	(Italy) Camila Giorgi	1,787	70	1	1,718	First round lost to (Poland) Magdalena Fręch
22	29	(Italy) Martina Trevisan	1,744	10	20	1,754	First round lost to (Italy) Elisabetta Cocciaretto [PR]
23	28	(Brazil) Beatriz Haddad Maia	1,782	—^{‡}	—	1,782	First round lost to (Slovenia) Kaja Juvan
24	31	(Belgium) Elise Mertens	1,615	130	30	1,515	Fourth round lost to (Tunisia) Ons Jabeur [3]
25	26	(Czech Republic) Petra Kvitová	1,795	10	1	1,781	Third round lost to (Spain) Paula Badosa [4]
26	32	(Romania) Sorana Cîrstea	1,430	130	30	1,330	Second round lost to (Germany) Tatjana Maria
27	33	(Kazakhstan) Yulia Putintseva	1,420	70	55	1,405	First round lost to (France) Alizé Cornet
28	36	(United States) Alison Riske-Amritraj	1,381	10	30	1,401	Third round lost to (Czech Republic) Marie Bouzková
29	34	(Ukraine) Anhelina Kalinina	1,417	96+140^{§}	30+30	1,241	Second round lost to (Ukraine) Lesia Tsurenko
30	39	(United States) Shelby Rogers	1,296	130	13	1,179	First round lost to (Croatia) Petra Martić
31	38	(Estonia) Kaia Kanepi	1,297	10	30	1,317	First round lost to (France) Diane Parry
32	45	(Spain) Sara Sorribes Tormo	1,221	70	43	1,194	Second round lost to (France) Harmony Tan
33	41	(China) Zhang Shuai	1,240	10	60	1,290	Third round lost to (France) Caroline Garcia

† Because the WTA is removing ranking points from the 2022 tournament, 2021 points will be replaced by the player's next best result instead.
‡ The player did not qualify for the tournament in 2021. Accordingly, no points will be replaced.
§ The player did not qualify for the tournament in 2021. She is defending points from two 2021 ITF tournaments (Montpellier and Contrexeville) instead.

=== Withdrawn players ===
The following players would have been seeded, but withdrew before the tournament began.

Rank	Player	Points before	Points defending	Next best result	Points after	Withdrawal reason
15	(Canada) Leylah Fernandez	2,590	10	8	2,588	Stress fracture in right foot

=== Banned players ===
The following players would have been seeded, but were not permitted to enter the tournament due to the decision to ban players from Russia and Belarus.

Rank	Player	Points before	Points defending	Next best result	Points after
6	(Belarus) Aryna Sabalenka	4,046	780	1	3,267
13	(Russia) Daria Kasatkina	2,645	70	60	2,635
20	(Belarus) Victoria Azarenka	2,086	70	0	2,016
21	(Russia) Veronika Kudermetova	2,045	10	55	2,090
30	(Russia) Ekaterina Alexandrova	1,706	70	55	1,691

== Other entry information ==
=== Wild cards ===
- (United Kingdom) Katie Boulter
- (United Kingdom) Jodie Burrage
- (United Kingdom) Sonay Kartal
- (United Kingdom) Yuriko Miyazaki
- (Australia) Daria Saville
- (United Kingdom) Katie Swan
- (United States) Serena Williams

=== Protected ranking ===
- (Italy) Elisabetta Cocciaretto (113)
- (Belgium) Kirsten Flipkens (97)

=== Qualifiers ===
- (United States) Emina Bektas
- (Sweden) Mirjam Björklund
- (United States) Louisa Chirico
- (Poland) Maja Chwalińska
- (Mexico) Fernanda Contreras Gómez
- (Croatia) Jana Fett
- (Australia) Jaimee Fourlis
- (United States) Catherine Harrison
- (Australia) Zoe Hives
- (Japan) Mai Hontama
- (Australia) Maddison Inglis
- (Poland) Katarzyna Kawa
- (United States) Christina McHale
- (Germany) Nastasja Schunk
- (Australia) Astra Sharma
- (Belgium) Yanina Wickmayer

=== Lucky losers ===
- (Netherlands) Lesley Pattinama Kerkhove
- (United States) CoCo Vandeweghe
- (China) Yuan Yue

=== Withdrawals ===
==== Banned list ====
The All England Lawn Tennis and Croquet Club declined entries from Russian and Belarusian players to The Championships 2022, stating that "in the circumstances of such unjustified and unprecedented military aggression, it would be unacceptable for the Russian regime to derive any benefits from the involvement of Russian or Belarusian players with The Championships".

- (Belarus) Aryna Sabalenka (7) → replaced by (Germany) Jule Niemeier (103)
- (Belarus) Victoria Azarenka (15) → replaced by (United Kingdom) Heather Watson (105)
- (Russia) Daria Kasatkina (20) → replaced by (Germany) Tamara Korpatsch (106)
- (Russia) Anastasia Pavlyuchenkova (21) → replaced by (Germany) Tatjana Maria (107)
- (Russia) Liudmila Samsonova (26) → replaced by (China) Wang Xiyu (108)
- (Russia) Veronika Kudermetova (30) → replaced by (Georgia (country)) Ekaterine Gorgodze (109)
- (Russia) Ekaterina Alexandrova (31) → replaced by (France) Kristina Mladenovic (110)
- (Belarus) Aliaksandra Sasnovich (45) → replaced by (United Kingdom) Harriet Dart (111)
- (Russia) Varvara Gracheva (71) → replaced by (France) Harmony Tan (112)
- (Russia) Anastasia Potapova (78) → replaced by (Bulgaria) Viktoriya Tomova (113)
- (Russia) Anna Kalinskaya (82) → replaced by (Italy) Elisabetta Cocciaretto (113 PR)

==== On entry list ====
- ‡ (Canada) Leylah Fernandez (17) → replaced by (Romania) Mihaela Buzărnescu (118)
- ‡ (Egypt) Mayar Sherif (50) → replaced by (Canada) Eugenie Bouchard (118 PR)
- ‡ (United States) Sofia Kenin (4 PR) → replaced by (Switzerland) Ylena In-Albon (119)
- ‡ (Croatia) Ana Konjuh (66) → replaced by (Ukraine) Lesia Tsurenko (121)
- ‡ (Japan) Naomi Osaka (38) → replaced by (United States) Bernarda Pera (122)
- ‡ (Canada) Eugenie Bouchard (118 PR) → replaced by (Brazil) Laura Pigossi (123)
- § (China) Wang Xinyu (57) → replaced by (China) Yuan Yue (LL)
- § (United States) Madison Keys (23) → replaced by (United States) CoCo Vandeweghe (LL)
- § (Montenegro) Danka Kovinić (71) → replaced by (Netherlands) Lesley Pattinama Kerkhove (LL)

‡ – withdrew from entry list
§ – withdrew from main draw

Rankings date: 16 May 2022

== Notes ==
Preceded by 2022 French Open – Women's singles	Grand Slam women's singles	Succeeded by 2022 US Open – Women's singles
