= 2022 Porsche Tennis Grand Prix – Singles =

Singles
- 2022 Porsche Tennis Grand Prix

Final
- Champion: (Poland) Iga Świątek
- Runner-up: Aryna Sabalenka
- Score: 6–2, 6–2

Details
- Draw: 28 (3WC, 4Q)
- Seeds: 8

Events
Singles	Doubles
← 2021 ·	Porsche Tennis Grand Prix	· 2023 →

Iga Świątek defeated Aryna Sabalenka in the final, 6–2, 6–2 to win the singles tennis title at the 2022 Women's Stuttgart Open. By winning her fourth consecutive title, Świątek extended her winning streak to 23 matches.

Ashleigh Barty was the defending champion, but she announced her retirement from professional tennis in March 2022.

== Seeds ==
The top four seeds received a bye into the second round.

1. (Poland) Iga Świątek (champion)
2. (Spain) Paula Badosa (semifinals)
3. Aryna Sabalenka (final)
4. (Greece) Maria Sakkari (second round, retired)
5. (Estonia) Anett Kontaveit (quarterfinals)
6. (Czech Republic) Karolína Plíšková (second round)
7. (Tunisia) Ons Jabeur (quarterfinals)
8. (United Kingdom) Emma Raducanu (quarterfinals)

== Draw ==
=== Key ===
- Q = Qualifier
- WC = Wild card
- LL = Lucky loser
- Alt = Alternate
- SE = Special exempt
- PR = Protected ranking
- ITF = ITF entry
- JE = Junior exempt
- w/o = Walkover
- r = Retired
- d = Defaulted
- SR = Special ranking

=== Finals ===
Semifinals
1	(Poland) Iga Świątek	6^{4}	6	7
Liudmila Samsonova	7^{7}	4	5
3	Aryna Sabalenka	7^{7}	6
2	(Spain) Paula Badosa	6^{5}	4

Final
1	(Poland) Iga Świątek	6	6
3	Aryna Sabalenka	2	2

=== Top half ===
First round
(Switzerland) V Golubic	7	5	5
Q	(Germany) E Lys	5	7	7
LL	(Germany) T Korpatsch	3	7^{7}	6
(Italy) C Giorgi	6	6^{2}	1
Q	(Australia) S Sanders	1	2
8	(United Kingdom) E Raducanu	6	6
WC	(Germany) L Siegemund	6	6
(Slovenia) T Zidanšek	3	3
L Samsonova	6	6
Q	(France) C Paquet	0	0
(Czech Republic) P Kvitová	4	6	6^{5}
6	(Czech Republic) Ka Plíšková	6	4	7^{7}

Second round
1	(Poland) I Świątek	6	6
Q	(Germany) E Lys	1	1
LL	(Germany) T Korpatsch	0	6	1
8	(United Kingdom) E Raducanu	6	2	6
4	(Greece) M Sakkari	4	1^{r}
WC	(Germany) L Siegemund	6	3
L Samsonova	6	6
6	(Czech Republic) Ka Plíšková	4	4

Quarterfinals
1	(Poland) I Świątek	6	6
8	(United Kingdom) E Raducanu	4	4
WC	(Germany) L Siegemund	5	3
L Samsonova	7	6

Semifinals
1	(Poland) I Świątek	6^{4}	6	7
L Samsonova	7^{7}	4	5

=== Bottom half ===
First round
5	(Estonia) A Kontaveit	3	6	6
(Germany) A Kerber	6	4	4
(China) S Zhang	6^{5}	6^{6}
E Alexandrova	7^{7}	7^{8}
WC	(Germany) J Niemeier	6^{5}	3
(Canada) B Andreescu	7^{7}	6
7	(Tunisia) O Jabeur	4	6	6
(Czech Republic) M Vondroušová	6	2	3
(United States) C Gauff	4	2
D Kasatkina	6	6
(Kazakhstan) E Rybakina	7^{7}	7
Q	(Germany) N Schunk	6^{3}	5

Second round
5	(Estonia) A Kontaveit	2	6	7^{7}
E Alexandrova	6	3	6^{5}
(Canada) B Andreescu	1	6	2
3	A Sabalenka	6	3	6
7	(Tunisia) O Jabeur	6	6
D Kasatkina	3	3
(Kazakhstan) E Rybakina	2	6	6^{4}
2	(Spain) P Badosa	6	4	7^{7}

Quarterfinals
5	(Estonia) A Kontaveit	4	6	1
3	A Sabalenka	6	3	6
7	(Tunisia) O Jabeur	6^{9}	6	3
2	(Spain) P Badosa	7^{11}	1	6

Semifinals
3	A Sabalenka	7^{7}	6
2	(Spain) P Badosa	6^{5}	4

== Qualifying ==
=== Seeds ===
1. (Hungary) Panna Udvardy (first round)
2. (France) Chloé Paquet (qualified)
3. (Germany) Tamara Korpatsch (qualifying competition, lucky loser)
4. (Australia) Maddison Inglis (first round)
5. (Spain) Cristina Bucșa (first round)
6. Elina Avanesyan (qualifying competition)
7. (Switzerland) Stefanie Vögele (qualifying competition)
8. (Australia) Storm Sanders (qualified)

=== Qualifiers ===
1. (Germany) Eva Lys
2. (France) Chloé Paquet
3. (Australia) Storm Sanders
4. (Germany) Nastasja Schunk

=== Lucky loser ===
1. (Germany) Tamara Korpatsch

=== Qualifying draw ===
==== First qualifier ====
First round
1	(Hungary) Panna Udvardy	6^{3}	1
PR	(Liechtenstein) Kathinka von Deichmann	7^{7}	6
WC	(Germany) Eva Lys	6	3	6
5	(Spain) Cristina Bucșa	1	6	4

Qualifying competition
PR	(Liechtenstein) Kathinka von Deichmann	3	5
WC	(Germany) Eva Lys	6	7

==== Second qualifier ====
First round
2	(France) Chloé Paquet	6	3	6
(Australia) Ellen Perez	4	6	2
(France) Carole Monnet	2	0
7	(Switzerland) Stefanie Vögele	6	6

Qualifying competition
2	(France) Chloé Paquet	6	6
7	(Switzerland) Stefanie Vögele	2	3

==== Third qualifier ====
First round
3	(Germany) Tamara Korpatsch	6	6
(Luxembourg) Mandy Minella	4	3
WC	(Germany) Mara Guth	3	2
8	(Australia) Storm Sanders	6	6

Qualifying competition
3	(Germany) Tamara Korpatsch	3	4
8	(Australia) Storm Sanders	6	6

==== Fourth qualifier ====
First round
4	(Australia) Maddison Inglis	6	4	1
(Germany) Nastasja Schunk	4	6	6
(Italy) Federica Di Sarra	4	6	3
6	Elina Avanesyan	6	4	6

Qualifying competition
(Germany) Nastasja Schunk	6	6
6	Elina Avanesyan	4	1
