= 2022 Porsche Tennis Grand Prix =

Women's tennis tournament

- Date: 18–24 April
- Edition: 44th
- Category: WTA 500
- Draw: 28S / 16D
- Prize money: $757,900
- Surface: Clay (indoor)
- Location: Stuttgart, Germany
- Venue: Porsche-Arena

Champions

Singles
- (Poland) Iga Świątek

Doubles
- (United States) Desirae Krawczyk / (Netherlands) Demi Schuurs
← 2021 ·	Porsche Tennis Grand Prix	· 2023 →

The 2022 Porsche Tennis Grand Prix was a women's professional tennis tournament played on indoor clay courts at the Porsche Arena in Stuttgart, Germany, from 18 to 24 April 2022. It was the 44th edition of the Porsche Tennis Grand Prix and is classified as a WTA 500 tournament on the 2022 WTA Tour.

== Finals ==
=== Singles ===
- (Poland) Iga Świątek defeated Aryna Sabalenka, 6–2, 6–2

This is Świątek's fourth WTA singles title of the year and seventh of her career.

=== Doubles ===
- (United States) Desirae Krawczyk / (Netherlands) Demi Schuurs defeated (United States) Coco Gauff / (China) Zhang Shuai, 6–3, 6–4

== Point distribution ==
Event	W	F	SF	QF	Round of 16	Round of 32	Q	Q2	Q1
Singles	470	305	185	100	55	1	25	13	1
Doubles	470	305	185	100	1	—	—	—	—

== Prize money ==
Event	W	F	SF	QF	Round of 16	Round of 32^{1}	Q2	Q1
Singles	$68,570	$51,000	$32,400	$15,500	$8,200	$6,650	$5,000	$2,565
Doubles*	$25,230	$17,750	$10,000	$5,500	$3,500	—	—	—

_{^{1}Qualifiers prize money is also the Round of 32 prize money.}
_{*per team}

== Singles main draw entrants ==
=== Seeds ===
Country	Player	Rank^{1}	Seed
POL	Iga Świątek	1	1
ESP	Paula Badosa	3	2
	Aryna Sabalenka	4	3
GRE	Maria Sakkari	5	4
EST	Anett Kontaveit	6	5
CZE	Karolína Plíšková	7	6
TUN	Ons Jabeur	9	7
GBR	Emma Raducanu	12	8

- ^{1} Rankings are as of 11 April 2022.

=== Other entrants ===
The following player received a wildcard into the main draw:

- (Germany) Jule Niemeier
- (Germany) Laura Siegemund

The following players received entry from the qualifying draw:

- (Germany) Eva Lys
- (France) Chloé Paquet
- (Australia) Storm Sanders
- (Germany) Nastasja Schunk

The following player received entry as a lucky loser :

- (Germany) Tamara Korpatsch

=== Withdrawals ===
Before the tournament

- (Belarus) Victoria Azarenka → replaced by (Czech Republic) Petra Kvitová
- (United States) Danielle Collins → replaced by (China) Zhang Shuai
- (Czech Republic) Barbora Krejčíková → replaced by (Switzerland) Viktorija Golubic
- (Latvia) Jeļena Ostapenko → replaced by (Canada) Bianca Andreescu
- (Italy) Jasmine Paolini → replaced by (Germany) Tamara Korpatsch
- Anastasia Pavlyuchenkova → replaced by (Czech Republic) Markéta Vondroušová
- (Ukraine) Elina Svitolina → replaced by (Italy) Camila Giorgi

During the tournament

- (Greece) Maria Sakkari (GI illness)

== Doubles main draw entrants ==
=== Seeds ===
Country	Player	Country	Player	Rank^{1}	Seed
USA	Coco Gauff	CHN	Zhang Shuai	15	1
USA	Desirae Krawczyk	NED	Demi Schuurs	40	2
UKR	Lyudmyla Kichenok	AUS	Storm Sanders	53	3
JPN	Shuko Aoyama	TPE	Chan Hao-ching	64	4

- ^{1} Rankings as of 11 April 2022.

=== Other entrants ===
The following pairs received a wildcard into the doubles main draw:

- (Germany) Jule Niemeier / (Germany) Nastasja Schunk

The following pairs received entry as an alternates:

- (Spain) Cristina Bucșa / (Slovenia) Tamara Zidanšek

=== Withdrawals ===
Before the tournament

- (Georgia (country)) Ekaterine Gorgodze / (United States) Sabrina Santamaria → replaced by (Romania) Andreea Mitu / (United States) Sabrina Santamaria
- (Germany) Vivian Heisen / (Romania) Monica Niculescu → replaced by (Germany) Vivian Heisen / (Hungary) Panna Udvardy
- (Ukraine) Nadiia Kichenok / (Romania) Raluca Olaru → replaced by (Ukraine) Nadiia Kichenok / (Australia) Anastasia Rodionova
- (Italy) Jasmine Paolini / (Germany) Laura Siegemund → replaced by (Spain) Cristina Bucșa / (Slovenia) Tamara Zidanšek
- (Australia) Ellen Perez / (United States) Nicole Melichar-Martinez → replaced by (Indonesia) Jessy Rompies / (Thailand) Peangtarn Plipuech
