= 2022 WTA Finals – Singles =

Singles
- 2022 WTA Finals

Final
- Champion: (France) Caroline Garcia
- Runner-up: Aryna Sabalenka
- Score: 7–6^{(7–4)}, 6–4

Details
- Draw: 8 (round robin + elimination)
- Seeds: 8

Events
Singles	Doubles
← 2021 ·	WTA Finals	· 2023 →

Caroline Garcia defeated Aryna Sabalenka in the final, 7–6^{(7–4)}, 6–4 to win the women's singles tennis title at the 2022 WTA Finals. She was the first Frenchwoman to win the year-end championships since Amélie Mauresmo in 2005. It was Garcia's eleventh and last career WTA Tour singles title.

Garbiñe Muguruza was the reigning champion, but did not qualify this year.

Sabalenka was the fourth player in the Open Era – after Steffi Graf, Venus Williams, and Serena Williams – to defeat the world's top-three ranked players at the same tournament, defeating world No. 2 Ons Jabeur and No. 3 Jessica Pegula in the round-robin and No. 1 Iga Świątek in the semifinals. Sabalenka remains the only player who did not win the tournament after doing so.

Jabeur, Pegula, Coco Gauff and Daria Kasatkina all made their singles debut at the event, although this marked the first time since 2012 that no debutant reached the semifinals.

This marked the first time since 2015 where two players won all three of their round-robin matches but were both defeated in the semifinals.

== Seeds ==
1. (Poland) Iga Świątek (semifinals)
2. (Tunisia) Ons Jabeur (round robin)
3. (United States) Jessica Pegula (round robin)
4. (United States) Coco Gauff (round robin)
5. (Greece) Maria Sakkari (semifinals)
6. (France) Caroline Garcia (champion)
7. Aryna Sabalenka (final)
8. Daria Kasatkina (round robin)

== Alternates ==
1. Veronika Kudermetova (did not play)
2. (United States) Madison Keys (did not play)

== Draw ==
=== Key ===
- Q = Qualifier
- WC = Wild card
- LL = Lucky loser
- Alt = Alternate
- ITF = ITF entry
- PR = Protected ranking
- SR = Special ranking
- SE = Special exempt
- JE = Junior exempt
- JR = Junior Accelerator Programme entrant
- CO = College Accelerator Programme entrant
- NG = Next Gen Accelerator Program entrant
- w/o = Walkover
- r = Retired
- d = Defaulted

=== Finals ===
Semifinals
1	(Poland) Iga Świątek	2	6	1
7	Aryna Sabalenka	6	2	6
5	(Greece) Maria Sakkari	3	2
6	(France) Caroline Garcia	6	6

Final
7	Aryna Sabalenka	6^{4}	4
6	(France) Caroline Garcia	7^{7}	6

=== Group Tracy Austin ===
		(Poland) Świątek	(United States) Gauff	(France) Garcia	Kasatkina	RR; W–L	Set; W–L	Game; W–L	Standings
1	(Poland) Iga Świątek		6–3, 6–0	6–3, 6–2	6–2, 6–3	3–0	6–0 (100%)	36–13 (73%)	1
4	(United States) Coco Gauff	3–6, 0–6		4–6, 3–6	6–7^{(6–8)}, 3–6	0–3	0–6 (0%)	19–37 (34%)	4
6	(France) Caroline Garcia	3–6, 2–6	6–4, 6–3		4–6, 6–1, 7–6^{(7–5)}	2–1	4–3 (57%)	34–32 (52%)	2
8	Daria Kasatkina	2–6, 3–6	7–6^{(8–6)}, 6–3	6–4, 1–6, 6–7^{(5–7)}		1–2	3–4 (43%)	31–38 (45%)	3

=== Group Nancy Richey ===
		(Tunisia) Jabeur	(United States) Pegula	(Greece) Sakkari	Sabalenka	RR; W–L	Set; W–L	Game; W–L	Standings
2	(Tunisia) Ons Jabeur		1–6, 6–3, 6–3	2–6, 3–6	6–3, 6–7^{(5–7)}, 5–7	1–2	3–5 (38%)	35–41 (46%)	3
3	(United States) Jessica Pegula	6–1, 3–6, 3–6		6–7^{(6–8)}, 6–7^{(4–7)}	3–6, 5–7	0–3	1–6 (14%)	32–40 (44%)	4
5	(Greece) Maria Sakkari	6–2, 6–3	7–6^{(8–6)}, 7–6^{(7–4)}		6–2, 6–4	3–0	6–0 (100%)	38–23 (62%)	1
7	Aryna Sabalenka	3–6, 7–6^{(7–5)}, 7–5	6–3, 7–5	2–6, 4–6		2–1	4–3 (57%)	36–37 (49%)	2
