= 2022 Qatar Total Open =

- Date: 20–26 February 2022
- Edition: 20th
- Category: WTA 1000
- Draw: 56S / 28D
- Prize money: $2,331,698
- Surface: Hard / outdoor
- Location: Doha, Qatar
- Venue: Khalifa International Tennis and Squash Complex

Champions

Singles
- (Poland) Iga Świątek

Doubles
- (United States) Coco Gauff / (United States) Jessica Pegula
← 2021 ·	Qatar Open	· 2023 →

The 2022 Qatar Total Open, known also as Qatar TotalEnergies Open, was a professional women's tennis tournament played on outdoor hard courts. It was the 20th edition of the event and a non-mandatory WTA 1000 tournament on the 2022 WTA Tour. It took place at the International Tennis and Squash complex in Doha, Qatar, during 20–26 February 2022.

== Finals ==
=== Singles ===
- (Poland) Iga Świątek defeated (Estonia) Anett Kontaveit, 6–2, 6–0

This was Świątek's fourth WTA singles title, and first of the year.

=== Doubles ===
- (United States) Coco Gauff / (United States) Jessica Pegula defeated (Russia) Veronika Kudermetova / (Belgium) Elise Mertens, 3–6, 7–5, [10–5]

== Point distribution ==
Event	W	F	SF	QF	Round of 16	Round of 32	Round of 56	Q	Q2	Q1
Singles	900	585	350	190	105	60	1	30	20	1
Doubles	900	585	350	190	105	1	—	—	—	—

== Prize money ==
Event	W	F	SF	QF	Round of 16	Round of 32	Round of 56	Q2	Q1
Singles	$380,000	$224,000	$115,289	$53,000	$26,515	$15,080	$10,820	$6,350	$3,300
Doubles*	$111,000	$82,400	$34,300	$17,300	$9,800	$6,570	—	—	—

_{*per team}

== Singles main-draw entrants ==
=== Seeds ===
Country	Player	Rank^{1}	Seed
BLR	Aryna Sabalenka	2	1
CZE	Barbora Krejčíková	3	2
ESP	Paula Badosa	5	3
EST	Anett Kontaveit	6	4
ESP	Garbiñe Muguruza	7	5
GRE	Maria Sakkari	8	6
POL	Iga Świątek	9	7
TUN	Ons Jabeur	10	8
USA	Jessica Pegula	14	9
UKR	Elina Svitolina	15	10
KAZ	Elena Rybakina	16	11
BLR	Victoria Azarenka	17	12
GER	Angelique Kerber	18	13
USA	Coco Gauff	20	14
LAT	Jeļena Ostapenko	21	15
BEL	Elise Mertens	22	16

- ^{1} Rankings as of February 14, 2022

=== Other entrants ===
The following players received wildcards into the singles main draw:

- (France) Alizé Cornet
- (France) Caroline Garcia
- (Turkey) İpek Öz
- (Egypt) Mayar Sherif
- (Russia) Vera Zvonareva

The following players received entry from the qualifying draw:

- (France) Océane Dodin
- (Brazil) Beatriz Haddad Maia
- (Slovenia) Kaja Juvan
- (Ukraine) Marta Kostyuk
- (Germany) Andrea Petkovic
- (Belarus) Aliaksandra Sasnovich
- (Switzerland) Stefanie Vögele
- (China) Zhang Shuai

The following players received entry as lucky losers:

- (Romania) Jaqueline Cristian
- (Netherlands) Arantxa Rus

=== Withdrawals ===
Before the tournament

- (Russia) Ekaterina Alexandrova → replaced by (United States) Amanda Anisimova
- (United States) Danielle Collins → replaced by (Romania) Irina-Camelia Begu
- (Ukraine) Anhelina Kalinina → replaced by (Netherlands) Arantxa Rus
- (Russia) Anastasia Pavlyuchenkova → replaced by (Belgium) Alison Van Uytvanck
- (Czech Republic) Karolína Plíšková → replaced by (Croatia) Ana Konjuh
- (Czech Republic) Markéta Vondroušová → replaced by (Romania) Jaqueline Cristian
- (Slovenia) Tamara Zidanšek → replaced by (United States) Ann Li

During the tournament

- (Belarus) Victoria Azarenka (left hip injury)

Retirements

- (Romania) Jaqueline Cristian (knee injury)
- (Czech Republic) Petra Kvitová (left wrist injury)

== Doubles main-draw entrants ==
=== Seeds ===
Country	Player	Country	Player	Rank^{1}	Seed
CZE	Barbora Krejčiková	CZE	Kateřina Siniaková	3	1
JPN	Ena Shibahara	CHN	Zhang Shuai	12	2
RUS	Veronika Kudermetova	BEL	Elise Mertens	13	3
CAN	Gabriela Dabrowski	MEX	Giuliana Olmos	28	4
CHI	Alexa Guarachi	USA	Nicole Melichar-Martinez	32	5
UKR	Lyudmyla Kichenok	LAT	Jeļena Ostapenko	52	6
USA	Desirae Krawczyk	AUS	Ellen Perez	53	7
KAZ	Anna Danilina	BRA	Beatriz Haddad Maia	63	8

- Rankings are as of February 14, 2022.

=== Other entrants ===
The following pairs received wildcards into the doubles main draw:

- (Qatar) Mubarka Al-Naemi / (Turkey) İpek Öz
- (Sweden) Mirjam Björklund / (United Kingdom) Emily Webley-Smith

The following pair received entry as alternates:

- (Georgia (country)) Oksana Kalashnikova / (Belgium) Maryna Zanevska

=== Withdrawals ===
Before the tournament

- (Germany) Vivian Heisen / (China) Xu Yifan → replaced by (Georgia (country)) Oksana Kalashnikova / (Belgium) Maryna Zanevska
