= 2022 Wimbledon Championships – Women's singles qualifying =

Women's singles qualifying
- 2022 Wimbledon Championships

Events
Singles	men	women		boys	girls
Doubles	men	women	mixed	boys	girls
WC Singles	men	women	quad
WC Doubles	men	women	quad
14&U Singles	boys	girls
Legends	men	women	mixed

Qualification
Singles	men	women
- Wimbledon Championships

The 2022 Wimbledon Championships – Women's singles qualifying was a series of tennis matches that took place from 20 to 23 June 2022 to determine the qualifiers for the 2022 Wimbledon Championships – Women's singles event, and, if necessary, the lucky losers.

16 of the 128 qualifiers who compete in this knockout tournament secured a main draw place.

== Seeds ==
1. (United States) Katie Volynets (second round)
2. (United States) CoCo Vandeweghe (third round, lucky loser)
3. (Sweden) Mirjam Björklund (qualified)
4. (Spain) Cristina Bucșa (second round)
5. (Australia) Maddison Inglis (qualified)
6. (Poland) Katarzyna Kawa (qualified)
7. (Ukraine) Daria Snigur (second round)
8. (Hungary) Réka Luca Jani (second round)
9. (Japan) Mai Hontama (qualified)
10. (Australia) Astra Sharma (qualified)
11. (United States) Robin Anderson (second round)
12. (France) Tessah Andrianjafitrimo (second round)
13. (Austria) Julia Grabher (first round)
14. (Netherlands) Lesley Pattinama Kerkhove (third round, lucky loser)
15. (China) Yuan Yue (third round, lucky loser)
16. (France) Fiona Ferro (third round)

17. (Belgium) Ysaline Bonaventure (second round)
18. (Argentina) Paula Ormaechea (first round)
19. (United States) Asia Muhammad (first round)
20. (Romania) Gabriela Lee (first round)
21. (Germany) Nastasja Schunk (qualified)
22. (Greece) Despina Papamichail (second round)
23. (South Korea) Jang Su-jeong (third round)
24. (Romania) Alexandra Cadanțu-Ignatik (second round)
25. (Ukraine) Kateryna Baindl (first round)
26. (France) Léolia Jeanjean (third round)
27. (Australia) Olivia Gadecki (first round)
28. (Mexico) Fernanda Contreras Gómez (qualified)
29. (Netherlands) Arianne Hartono (second round)
30. (Slovakia) Viktória Kužmová (second round)
31. (Andorra) Victoria Jiménez Kasintseva (third round)
32. (Turkey) İpek Öz (first round)

Click on the seed number of a player to go to their draw section.

== Qualifiers ==
1. (Australia) Zoe Hives
2. (Poland) Maja Chwalińska
3. (Sweden) Mirjam Björklund
4. (Germany) Nastasja Schunk
5. (Australia) Maddison Inglis
6. (Poland) Katarzyna Kawa
7. (Mexico) Fernanda Contreras Gómez
8. (United States) Louisa Chirico

9. (Japan) Mai Hontama
10. (Australia) Astra Sharma
11. (Croatia) Jana Fett
12. (Australia) Jaimee Fourlis
13. (Belgium) Yanina Wickmayer
14. (United States) Christina McHale
15. (United States) Catherine Harrison
16. (United States) Emina Bektas

== Lucky losers ==
1. (United States) CoCo Vandeweghe
2. (Netherlands) Lesley Pattinama Kerkhove
3. (China) Yuan Yue

== Draw ==
Key

- Q = Qualifier
- WC = Wild card
- LL = Lucky loser
- Alt = Alternate
- ITF = ITF entry
- PR = Protected ranking
- SR = Special ranking
- SE = Special exempt
- JE = Junior exempt
- JR = Junior Accelerator Programme entrant
- CO = College Accelerator Programme entrant
- NG = Next Gen Accelerator Program entrant
- w/o = Walkover
- r = Retired
- d = Defaulted

=== First qualifier ===
First round
1	(United States) Katie Volynets	6	6
(Germany) Anna-Lena Friedsam	3	3
(Greece) Valentini Grammatikopoulou	6	4	5
(Australia) Priscilla Hon	2	6	7
(Lithuania) Justina Mikulskytė	6	3	4
(United States) Sachia Vickery	1	6	6
PR	(Australia) Zoe Hives	6	6
20	(Romania) Gabriela Lee	2	4

Second round
1	(United States) Katie Volynets	2	4
(Australia) Priscilla Hon	6	6
(United States) Sachia Vickery	0	3
PR	(Australia) Zoe Hives	6	6

Third round
(Australia) Priscilla Hon
PR	(Australia) Zoe Hives	w/o

=== Second qualifier ===
First round
2	(United States) CoCo Vandeweghe	5	6	7^{10}
WC	(United Kingdom) Ella McDonald	7	1	6^{8}
(Spain) Yvonne Cavallé Reimers	4	3
(Latvia) Daniela Vismane	6	6
(Poland) Maja Chwalińska	6	4	6
(Spain) Aliona Bolsova	2	6	4
(Romania) Cristina Dinu	3	1
24	(Romania) Alexandra Cadanțu-Ignatik	6	6

Second round
2	(United States) CoCo Vandeweghe	7	6
(Latvia) Daniela Vismane	5	1
(Poland) Maja Chwalińska	6	5	6
24	(Romania) Alexandra Cadanțu-Ignatik	2	7	2

Third round
2	(United States) CoCo Vandeweghe	6	3	4
(Poland) Maja Chwalińska	3	6	6

=== Third qualifier ===
First round
3	(Sweden) Mirjam Björklund	6	6^{7}	7^{10}
(Italy) Sara Errani	4	7^{9}	6^{6}
(Australia) Storm Sanders	7^{7}	6
WC	(United Kingdom) Anna Brogan	6^{2}	4
(Chinese Taipei) Liang En-shuo	6	6
(Colombia) Emiliana Arango	3	3
(Argentina) María Lourdes Carlé	3	6	6
25	(Ukraine) Kateryna Baindl	6	1	3

Second round
3	(Sweden) Mirjam Björklund	6	6
(Australia) Storm Sanders	4	2
(Chinese Taipei) Liang En-shuo	0	6	1
(Argentina) María Lourdes Carlé	6	3	6

Third round
3	(Sweden) Mirjam Björklund	7^{7}	6^{5}	6
(Argentina) María Lourdes Carlé	6^{2}	7^{7}	1

=== Fourth qualifier ===
First round
4	(Spain) Cristina Bucșa	6	6
(Czech Republic) Jesika Malečková	2	1
(United States) Danielle Lao	7	6
(Brazil) Carolina Alves	5	3
PR	(Italy) Jessica Pieri	6	6
(Italy) Giulia Gatto-Monticone	4	2
(Czech Republic) Miriam Kolodziejová	1	4
21	(Germany) Nastasja Schunk	6	6

Second round
4	(Spain) Cristina Bucșa	6	4	4
(United States) Danielle Lao	1	6	6
PR	(Italy) Jessica Pieri	5	3
21	(Germany) Nastasja Schunk	7	6

Third round
(United States) Danielle Lao	1	3
21	(Germany) Nastasja Schunk	6	6

=== Fifth qualifier ===
First round
5	(Australia) Maddison Inglis	7^{10}	6
(Netherlands) Indy de Vroome	6^{8}	1
(Luxembourg) Mandy Minella	6	0	6
(South Korea) Han Na-lae	2	6	2
(Australia) Seone Mendez	1	5
(Serbia) Natalija Stevanović	6	7
(Germany) Eva Lys	6	3	2
22	(Greece) Despina Papamichail	3	6	6

Second round
5	(Australia) Maddison Inglis	7^{7}	3	6
(Luxembourg) Mandy Minella	6^{3}	6	2
(Serbia) Natalija Stevanović	6	6
22	(Greece) Despina Papamichail	2	4

Third round
5	(Australia) Maddison Inglis	7^{7}	2	6
(Serbia) Natalija Stevanović	6^{2}	6	2

=== Sixth qualifier ===
First round
6	(Poland) Katarzyna Kawa	6	3	6
(Switzerland) Susan Bandecchi	2	6	2
(Cyprus) Raluca Șerban	4	6^{4}
(United States) Sophie Chang	6	7^{7}
(United States) Grace Min	6	3	2
(Italy) Lucrezia Stefanini	4	6	6
(Brazil) Gabriela Cé	2	6	5
26	(France) Léolia Jeanjean	6	0	7

Second round
6	(Poland) Katarzyna Kawa	6	6
(United States) Sophie Chang	4	2
(Italy) Lucrezia Stefanini	3	6	3
26	(France) Léolia Jeanjean	6	2	6

Third round
6	(Poland) Katarzyna Kawa	7	6
26	(France) Léolia Jeanjean	5	2

=== Seventh qualifier ===
First round
7	(Ukraine) Daria Snigur	7	6
(Netherlands) Suzan Lamens	5	1
(Germany) Katharina Gerlach	1	1
(Hungary) Tímea Babos	6	6
WC	(United Kingdom) Talia Neilson Gatenby	2	2
(United States) Jamie Loeb	6	6
(Croatia) Tena Lukas	4	6^{3}
28	(Mexico) Fernanda Contreras Gómez	6	7^{7}

Second round
7	(Ukraine) Daria Snigur	0	2
(Hungary) Tímea Babos	6	6
(United States) Jamie Loeb	6^{2}	4
28	(Mexico) Fernanda Contreras Gómez	7^{7}	6

Third round
(Hungary) Tímea Babos	3	6	3
28	(Mexico) Fernanda Contreras Gómez	6	1	6

=== Eighth qualifier ===
First round
8	(Hungary) Réka Luca Jani	6	6
(Finland) Anastasia Kulikova	4	3
(Czech Republic) Anna Sisková	6	1	0
(United States) Louisa Chirico	1	6	6
PR	(United Kingdom) Maia Lumsden	3	2
(Liechtenstein) Kathinka von Deichmann	6	6
(Uzbekistan) Nigina Abduraimova	0	6	6
32	(Turkey) İpek Öz	6	4	2

Second round
8	(Hungary) Réka Luca Jani	3	2
(United States) Louisa Chirico	6	6
(Liechtenstein) Kathinka von Deichmann	6	6
(Uzbekistan) Nigina Abduraimova	4	4

Third round
(United States) Louisa Chirico	6	6^{6}	6
(Liechtenstein) Kathinka von Deichmann	3	7^{8}	1

=== Ninth qualifier ===
First round
9	(Japan) Mai Hontama	7	6
(Germany) Stephanie Wagner	5	2
(France) Elsa Jacquemot	5	3
(Australia) Lizette Cabrera	7	6
(Switzerland) Lulu Sun	7	6
(Italy) Federica Di Sarra	5	2
WC	(United Kingdom) Sarah Beth Grey	5	7	7^{10}
27	(Australia) Olivia Gadecki	7	5	6^{7}

Second round
9	(Japan) Mai Hontama	4	7	6
(Australia) Lizette Cabrera	6	5	1
(Switzerland) Lulu Sun	6	6
WC	(United Kingdom) Sarah Beth Grey	3	2

Third round
9	(Japan) Mai Hontama	6^{9}	6	6
(Switzerland) Lulu Sun	7^{11}	2	3

=== Tenth qualifier ===
First round
10	(Australia) Astra Sharma	7^{8}	6
(Switzerland) Joanne Züger	6^{6}	4
(Switzerland) Stefanie Vögele	4	6	4
(Spain) Irene Burillo Escorihuela	6	3	6
PR	(Australia) Kaylah McPhee	3	3
(Switzerland) Conny Perrin	6	6
(Austria) Barbara Haas	3	3
31	(Andorra) Victoria Jiménez Kasintseva	6	6

Second round
10	(Australia) Astra Sharma	6	4	6
(Spain) Irene Burillo Escorihuela	3	6	3
(Switzerland) Conny Perrin	4	3
31	(Andorra) Victoria Jiménez Kasintseva	6	6

Third round
10	(Australia) Astra Sharma	3	6	6
31	(Andorra) Victoria Jiménez Kasintseva	6	2	3

=== Eleventh qualifier ===
First round
11	(United States) Robin Anderson	3	7^{7}	6
(Australia) Ellen Perez	6	6^{5}	2
WC	(United Kingdom) Ranah Stoiber	3	7^{7}	5
(Ukraine) Katarina Zavatska	6	6^{5}	7
(United States) Alycia Parks	1	2
(Georgia (country)) Mariam Bolkvadze	6	6
(Croatia) Jana Fett	6	6
18	(Argentina) Paula Ormaechea	1	1

Second round
11	(United States) Robin Anderson	4	3
(Ukraine) Katarina Zavatska	6	6
(Georgia (country)) Mariam Bolkvadze	7	1	2
(Croatia) Jana Fett	5	6	6

Third round
(Ukraine) Katarina Zavatska	6	3	3
(Croatia) Jana Fett	3	6	6

=== Twelfth qualifier ===
First round
12	(France) Tessah Andrianjafitrimo	2	6	7^{10}
(Czech Republic) Linda Fruhvirtová	6	4	6^{6}
(Czech Republic) Tereza Smitková	3	5
(France) Jessika Ponchet	6	7
(Australia) Jaimee Fourlis	5	7^{7}	6
(Bosnia and Herzegovina) Dea Herdželaš	7	6^{4}	4
(Argentina) Nadia Podoroska	6	6
19	(United States) Asia Muhammad	3	3

Second round
12	(France) Tessah Andrianjafitrimo	3	4
(France) Jessika Ponchet	6	6
(Australia) Jaimee Fourlis	6	7^{7}
(Argentina) Nadia Podoroska	4	6^{5}

Third round
(France) Jessika Ponchet	4	4
(Australia) Jaimee Fourlis	6	6

=== Thirteenth qualifier ===
First round
13	(Austria) Julia Grabher	4	6^{4}
PR	(Belgium) Yanina Wickmayer	6	7^{7}
(Switzerland) Simona Waltert	3	6	3
(Bulgaria) Isabella Shinikova	6	3	6
(Slovakia) Rebecca Šramková	6	3	6
(Norway) Ulrikke Eikeri	3	6	4
(Paraguay) Verónica Cepede Royg	6^{4}	1
23	(South Korea) Jang Su-jeong	7^{7}	6

Second round
PR	(Belgium) Yanina Wickmayer	6	6
(Bulgaria) Isabella Shinikova	0	3
(Slovakia) Rebecca Šramková	6	4	3
23	(South Korea) Jang Su-jeong	3	6	6

Third round
PR	(Belgium) Yanina Wickmayer	6	6
23	(South Korea) Jang Su-jeong	1	4

=== Fourteenth qualifier ===
First round
14	(Netherlands) Lesley Pattinama Kerkhove	6	6
PR	(Croatia) Lea Bošković	3	2
(Spain) Andrea Lázaro García	6	1	6
(Japan) Yuki Naito	1	6	2
(United States) Christina McHale	2	6	6
PR	(Romania) Laura Ioana Paar	6	4	4
(United States) Elvina Kalieva	1	4
30	(Slovakia) Viktória Kužmová	6	6

Second round
14	(Netherlands) Lesley Pattinama Kerkhove	7	2	6
(Spain) Andrea Lázaro García	5	6	4
(United States) Christina McHale	6	6
30	(Slovakia) Viktória Kužmová	3	4

Third round
14	(Netherlands) Lesley Pattinama Kerkhove	6^{3}	5
(United States) Christina McHale	7^{7}	7

=== Fifteenth qualifier ===
First round
15	(China) Yuan Yue	6	7
(Mexico) Marcela Zacarías	4	5
PR	(Germany) Antonia Lottner	6	1	1
(Italy) Cristiana Ferrando	4	6	6
(United States) Catherine Harrison	6	7
WC	(United Kingdom) Eden Silva	1	5
(United States) Francesca Di Lorenzo	4	4
17	(Belgium) Ysaline Bonaventure	6	6

Second round
15	(China) Yuan Yue	3	5
(Italy) Cristiana Ferrando	6	3^{r}
(United States) Catherine Harrison	7	6
17	(Belgium) Ysaline Bonaventure	5	1

Third round
15	(China) Yuan Yue	1	6^{3}
(United States) Catherine Harrison	6	7^{7}

=== Sixteenth qualifier ===
First round
16	(France) Fiona Ferro	7	6^{5}	7
(Japan) Moyuka Uchijima	5	7^{7}	5
WC	(United Kingdom) Mingge Xu	4	3
(United States) Hanna Chang	6	6
(United States) Emina Bektas	7^{7}	6
(Czech Republic) Sára Bejlek	6^{3}	3
(France) Carole Monnet	5	3
29	(Netherlands) Arianne Hartono	7	6

Second round
16	(France) Fiona Ferro	6	6
(United States) Hanna Chang	3	1
(United States) Emina Bektas	3	6	6
29	(Netherlands) Arianne Hartono	6	2	4

Third round
16	(France) Fiona Ferro	4	4
(United States) Emina Bektas	6	6
