= 2022 Wimbledon Championships – Men's singles qualifying =

Men's singles qualifying
- 2022 Wimbledon Championships

Events
| Singles | men | women | | boys | girls |
| Doubles | men | women | mixed | boys | girls |
| WC Singles | men | women | quad |
| WC Doubles | men | women | quad |
| Legends | men | women | mixed |
| 14&U Singles | boys | girls |

Qualification
| Singles | men | women |
| ← 2021 · | Wimbledon Championships | · 2023 → |

The 2022 Wimbledon Championships – Men's singles qualifying was a series of tennis matches that took place from 20 to 23 June 2022 to determine the qualifiers for the 2022 Wimbledon Championships – Men's singles event, and, if necessary, the lucky losers.

16 of the 128 qualifiers who compete in this knockout tournament secured a main draw place. This was also the final appearance for Philipp Kohlschreiber before his retirement.

== Seeds ==
1. (Spain) Bernabé Zapata Miralles (qualified)
2. (Australia) Jason Kubler (qualified)
3. (United States) Stefan Kozlov (qualifying competition, lucky loser)
4. (Czech Republic) Zdeněk Kolář (qualifying competition, lucky loser)
5. (Peru) Juan Pablo Varillas (first round)
6. (Switzerland) Marc-Andrea Hüsler (qualified)
7. (Moldova) Radu Albot (qualified)
8. (Germany) Yannick Hanfmann (second round)
9. (Argentina) Pedro Cachin (second round)
10. (Germany) Mats Moraing (first round)
11. (Chile) Tomás Barrios Vera (first round)
12. (France) Gilles Simon (first round)
13. (Portugal) Nuno Borges (qualifying competition, lucky loser)
14. (United States) Jack Sock (qualified)
15. (Argentina) Camilo Ugo Carabelli (first round, retired)
16. (Canada) Vasek Pospisil (first round)

17. (United States) Ernesto Escobedo (first round)
18. (Italy) Stefano Travaglia (first round)
19. (Czech Republic) Vít Kopřiva (second round)
20. (France) Manuel Guinard (first round)
21. (France) Hugo Grenier (qualifying competition, lucky loser)
22. (Italy) Franco Agamenone (first round)
23. (Austria) Dennis Novak (qualified)
24. (Sweden) Elias Ymer (qualifying competition, lucky loser)
25. (Italy) Flavio Cobolli (first round)
26. (Italy) Andreas Seppi (qualifying competition)
27. (United States) Mitchell Krueger (second round)
28. (Austria) Jurij Rodionov (second round)
29. (Ecuador) Emilio Gómez (first round)
30. (Australia) Max Purcell (qualified)
31. (Netherlands) Jesper de Jong (first round)
32. (Kazakhstan) Mikhail Kukushkin (qualified)

Click on the seed number of a player to go to their draw section.

== Qualifiers ==
1. (Spain) Bernabé Zapata Miralles
2. (Australia) Jason Kubler
3. (Austria) Dennis Novak
4. (Italy) Andrea Vavassori
5. (Germany) Maximilian Marterer
6. (Switzerland) Marc-Andrea Hüsler
7. (Moldova) Radu Albot
8. (Slovakia) Lukáš Klein

9. (France) Enzo Couacaud
10. (Kazakhstan) Mikhail Kukushkin
11. (Czech Republic) Lukáš Rosol
12. (Switzerland) Alexander Ritschard
13. (Australia) Max Purcell
14. (United States) Jack Sock
15. (Germany) Nicola Kuhn
16. (United States) Christian Harrison

== Lucky losers ==
1. (Czech Republic) Zdeněk Kolář
2. (France) Hugo Grenier
3. (United States) Stefan Kozlov
4. (Portugal) Nuno Borges
5. (Sweden) Elias Ymer

== Draw ==
=== Key ===
- Q = Qualifier
- WC = Wild card
- LL = Lucky loser
- Alt = Alternate
- ITF = ITF entry
- PR = Protected ranking
- SR = Special ranking
- SE = Special exempt
- JE = Junior exempt
- JR = Junior Accelerator Programme entrant
- CO = College Accelerator Programme entrant
- NG = Next Gen Accelerator Program entrant
- w/o = Walkover
- r = Retired
- d = Defaulted

=== First qualifier ===
First round
1 | (Spain) Bernabé Zapata Miralles | 7 | 6
PR | (India) Yuki Bhambri | 5 | 1
(France) Antoine Hoang | 6 | 7
PR | (Australia) Andrew Harris | 4 | 5
(Slovakia) Filip Horanský | 6 | 1 | 4
(Italy) Salvatore Caruso | 3 | 6 | 6
WC | (United Kingdom) Luca Pow | 1 | 4
27 | (United States) Mitchell Krueger | 6 | 6

Second round
1 | (Spain) Bernabé Zapata Miralles | 6 | 6
(France) Antoine Hoang | 2 | 3
(Italy) Salvatore Caruso | 7^{7} | 6
27 | (United States) Mitchell Krueger | 6^{2} | 3

Qualifying competition
1 | (Spain) Bernabé Zapata Miralles | 6 | 6^{5} | 6 | 6
(Italy) Salvatore Caruso | 4 | 7^{7} | 3 | 3

=== Second qualifier ===
First round
2 | (Australia) Jason Kubler | 3 | 7 | 6
(Turkey) Cem İlkel | 6 | 5 | 2
(Argentina) Thiago Agustín Tirante | 6 | 6
(Portugal) Frederico Ferreira Silva | 4 | 2
(Italy) Andrea Arnaboldi | 6 | 6^{5} | 5
(Italy) Riccardo Bonadio | 4 | 7^{7} | 7
(Serbia) Nikola Milojević | 2 | 3
24 | (Sweden) Elias Ymer | 6 | 6

Second round
2 | (Australia) Jason Kubler | 6 | 3 | 7
(Argentina) Thiago Agustín Tirante | 3 | 6 | 5
(Italy) Riccardo Bonadio | 3 | 4
24 | (Sweden) Elias Ymer | 6 | 6

Qualifying competition
2 | (Australia) Jason Kubler | 6 | 6 | 6
24 | (Sweden) Elias Ymer | 3 | 2 | 4

=== Third qualifier ===
First round
3 | (United States) Stefan Kozlov | 7 | 6
(France) Evan Furness | 5 | 3
(Ukraine) Vitaliy Sachko | 3 | 6 | 1^{r}
(Switzerland) Dominic Stricker | 6 | 2 | 4
(Italy) Federico Gaio | 6 | 6
PR | (Japan) Yūichi Sugita | 4 | 2
(Czech Republic) Jonáš Forejtek | 6^{2} | 1
23 | (Austria) Dennis Novak | 7^{7} | 6

Second round
3 | (United States) Stefan Kozlov | 7^{11} | 4 | 6
(Switzerland) Dominic Stricker | 6^{9} | 6 | 3
(Italy) Federico Gaio | 2 | 3
23 | (Austria) Dennis Novak | 6 | 6

Qualifying competition
3 | (United States) Stefan Kozlov | 5 | 4 | 7 | 6 | 3
23 | (Austria) Dennis Novak | 7 | 6 | 5 | 3 | 6

=== Fourth qualifier ===
First round
4 | (Czech Republic) Zdeněk Kolář | 6 | 6
PR | (Israel) Dudi Sela | 0 | 3
(Spain) Mario Vilella Martínez | 6 | 7^{7}
(Turkey) Altuğ Çelikbilek | 2 | 6^{4}
PR | (United States) Bradley Klahn | 7^{7} | 2 | 3
(Italy) Andrea Vavassori | 6^{5} | 6 | 6
PR | (Brazil) João Menezes | 6 | 6
18 | (Italy) Stefano Travaglia | 3 | 4

Second round
4 | (Czech Republic) Zdeněk Kolář | 6 | 2
(Spain) Mario Vilella Martínez | 1 | 0^{r}
(Italy) Andrea Vavassori | 7 | 6
PR | (Brazil) João Menezes | 5 | 1

Qualifying competition
4 | (Czech Republic) Zdeněk Kolář | 7^{7} | 6^{4} | 1 | 6^{5}
(Italy) Andrea Vavassori | 6^{5} | 7^{7} | 6 | 7^{7}

=== Fifth qualifier ===
First round
5 | (Peru) Juan Pablo Varillas | 2 | 6 | 4
(Germany) Maximilian Marterer | 6 | 1 | 6
(Italy) Andrea Pellegrino | 6 | 7
(Croatia) Nino Serdarušić | 3 | 5
WC | (United Kingdom) Arthur Fery | 6 | 6
(Italy) Thomas Fabbiano | 4 | 2
(United States) Nicolas Moreno de Alboran | 6 | 6
20 | (France) Manuel Guinard | 3 | 4

Second round
(Germany) Maximilian Marterer | 7 | 6
(Italy) Andrea Pellegrino | 5 | 3
WC | (United Kingdom) Arthur Fery | 6^{2} | 6^{3}
(United States) Nicolas Moreno de Alboran | 7^{7} | 7^{7}

Qualifying competition
(Germany) Maximilian Marterer | 7^{7} | 7^{13} | 6
(United States) Nicolas Moreno de Alboran | 6^{2} | 6^{11} | 3

=== Sixth qualifier ===
First round
6 | (Switzerland) Marc-Andrea Hüsler | 6 | 7^{7}
(Poland) Kacper Żuk | 3 | 6^{2}
(Slovakia) Andrej Martin | 6 | 6
(Slovakia) Lukáš Lacko | 2 | 1
(Chinese Taipei) Jason Jung | 6 | 3 | 6
(Austria) Filip Misolic | 2 | 6 | 2
(Ukraine) Illya Marchenko | 7 | 0 | 6
31 | (Netherlands) Jesper de Jong | 5 | 6 | 4

Second round
6 | (Switzerland) Marc-Andrea Hüsler | 6 | 7
(Slovakia) Andrej Martin | 2 | 5
(Chinese Taipei) Jason Jung | 7^{7} | 6
(Ukraine) Illya Marchenko | 6^{5} | 2

Qualifying competition
6 | (Switzerland) Marc-Andrea Hüsler | 7 | 6 | 3 | 3 | 6
(Chinese Taipei) Jason Jung | 5 | 4 | 6 | 6 | 2

=== Seventh qualifier ===
First round
7 | (Moldova) Radu Albot | 6 | 6
PR | (Italy) Roberto Marcora | 1 | 4
(United States) Michael Mmoh | 6 | 6
(Austria) Gerald Melzer | 1 | 3
PR | (Portugal) Pedro Sousa | 2 | 2
(Austria) Sebastian Ofner | 6 | 6
(India) Ramkumar Ramanathan | 5 | 4
19 | (Czech Republic) Vít Kopřiva | 7 | 6

Second round
7 | (Moldova) Radu Albot | 6 | 6
(United States) Michael Mmoh | 3 | 4
(Austria) Sebastian Ofner | 3 | 7^{7} | 7
19 | (Czech Republic) Vít Kopřiva | 6 | 6^{2} | 5

Qualifying competition
7 | (Moldova) Radu Albot | 2 | 6 | 6 | 7
(Austria) Sebastian Ofner | 6 | 3 | 4 | 5

=== Eighth qualifier ===
First round
8 | (Germany) Yannick Hanfmann | 6 | 6
(Netherlands) Jelle Sels | 4 | 4
PR | (Slovakia) Lukáš Klein | 6 | 6
WC | (United Kingdom) Billy Harris | 3 | 4
(Chile) Gonzalo Lama | 2 | 4
WC | (United Kingdom) Aidan McHugh | 6 | 6
(Bosnia and Herzegovina) Mirza Bašić | 2 | 6 | 0
26 | (Italy) Andreas Seppi | 6 | 4 | 6

Second round
8 | (Germany) Yannick Hanfmann | 5 | 2
PR | (Slovakia) Lukáš Klein | 7 | 6
WC | (United Kingdom) Aidan McHugh | 4 | 2
26 | (Italy) Andreas Seppi | 6 | 6

Qualifying competition
PR | (Slovakia) Lukáš Klein | 6 | 6^{3} | 7^{7} | 7^{7}
26 | (Italy) Andreas Seppi | 1 | 7^{7} | 6^{5} | 6^{4}

=== Ninth qualifier ===
First round
9 | (Argentina) Pedro Cachin | 7^{7} | 6
(France) Antoine Escoffier | 6^{5} | 4
(Bulgaria) Dimitar Kuzmanov | 6 | 7
WC | (United Kingdom) Charles Broom | 3 | 5
PR | (United States) Thai-Son Kwiatkowski | 5 | 3
(Argentina) Facundo Mena | 7 | 6
(France) Enzo Couacaud | 6 | 5 | 6
29 | (Ecuador) Emilio Gómez | 2 | 7 | 2

Second round
9 | (Argentina) Pedro Cachin | 4 | 6 | 4
(Bulgaria) Dimitar Kuzmanov | 6 | 3 | 6
(Argentina) Facundo Mena | 6^{5} | 4
(France) Enzo Couacaud | 7^{7} | 6

Qualifying competition
(Bulgaria) Dimitar Kuzmanov | 2 | 7^{7} | 3 | 2
(France) Enzo Couacaud | 6 | 6^{3} | 6 | 6

=== Tenth qualifier ===
First round
10 | (Germany) Mats Moraing | 2 | 0
(Hungary) Zsombor Piros | 6 | 6
(Argentina) Genaro Alberto Olivieri | 3 | 2
(Brazil) Matheus Pucinelli de Almeida | 6 | 6
(France) Grégoire Barrère | 2 | 2
(Germany) Philipp Kohlschreiber | 6 | 6
(Italy) Lorenzo Giustino | 2 | 1
32 | (Kazakhstan) Mikhail Kukushkin | 6 | 6

Second round
(Hungary) Zsombor Piros | 6 | 6
(Brazil) Matheus Pucinelli de Almeida | 4 | 4
(Germany) Philipp Kohlschreiber | 7^{7} | 3 | 4
32 | (Kazakhstan) Mikhail Kukushkin | 6^{4} | 6 | 6

Qualifying competition
(Hungary) Zsombor Piros | 6^{3} | 2 | 6 | 6^{0}
32 | (Kazakhstan) Mikhail Kukushkin | 7^{7} | 6 | 4 | 7^{7}

=== Eleventh qualifier ===
First round
11 | (Chile) Tomás Barrios Vera | 6 | 4 | 3
(United States) Christopher Eubanks | 4 | 6 | 6
(Brazil) Thiago Seyboth Wild | 2 | 0
(Czech Republic) Lukáš Rosol | 6 | 6
(Chinese Taipei) Wu Tung-lin | 4 | 4
(Argentina) Renzo Olivo | 6 | 6
(Slovakia) Jozef Kovalík | 4 | 6^{4}
28 | (Austria) Jurij Rodionov | 6 | 7^{7}

Second round
(United States) Christopher Eubanks | 6^{6} | 4
(Czech Republic) Lukáš Rosol | 7^{8} | 6
(Argentina) Renzo Olivo | 6 | 7^{7}
28 | (Austria) Jurij Rodionov | 4 | 6^{5}

Qualifying competition
(Czech Republic) Lukáš Rosol | 7^{7} | 7^{7} | 6
(Argentina) Renzo Olivo | 6^{5} | 6^{4} | 4

=== Twelfth qualifier ===
First round
12 | (France) Gilles Simon | 2 | 3
(Croatia) Duje Ajduković | 6 | 6
(Serbia) Miljan Zekić | 3 | 6^{3}
(Argentina) Santiago Rodríguez Taverna | 6 | 7^{7}
(Switzerland) Alexander Ritschard | 4 | 6 | 6
WC | (United Kingdom) Stuart Parker | 6 | 1 | 2
(Argentina) Nicolás Kicker | 6 | 6
25 | (Italy) Flavio Cobolli | 2 | 1

Second round
(Croatia) Duje Ajduković | 6 | 6
(Argentina) Santiago Rodríguez Taverna | 3 | 2
(Switzerland) Alexander Ritschard | 6 | 6
(Argentina) Nicolás Kicker | 3 | 2

Qualifying competition
(Croatia) Duje Ajduković | 3 | 5 | 4
(Switzerland) Alexander Ritschard | 6 | 7 | 6

=== Thirteenth qualifier ===
First round
13 | (Portugal) Nuno Borges | 6 | 6^{2} | 6
(Italy) Matteo Arnaldi | 3 | 7^{7} | 2
(Japan) Hiroki Moriya | 5 | 7^{7} | 6
(Croatia) Borna Gojo | 7 | 6^{5} | 1
WC | (United Kingdom) Felix Gill | 6^{10} | 7 | 3
(Portugal) Gastão Elias | 7^{12} | 5 | 6
(Netherlands) Gijs Brouwer | 5 | 6^{7}
30 | (Australia) Max Purcell | 7 | 7^{9}

Second round
13 | (Portugal) Nuno Borges | 4 | 6 | 6
(Japan) Hiroki Moriya | 6 | 4 | 3
(Portugal) Gastão Elias | 4 | 6^{4}
30 | (Australia) Max Purcell | 6 | 7^{7}

Qualifying competition
13 | (Portugal) Nuno Borges | 6 | 6^{3} | 4 | 6^{5}
30 | (Australia) Max Purcell | 3 | 7^{7} | 6 | 7^{7}

=== Fourteenth qualifier ===
First round
14 | (United States) Jack Sock | 6 | 6
(Argentina) Andrea Collarini | 4 | 2
(Romania) Marius Copil | 4 | 3
(France) Constant Lestienne | 6 | 6
(Spain) Javier Barranco Cosano | 2 | 6 | 6
(Argentina) Facundo Díaz Acosta | 6 | 4 | 4
(Italy) Alessandro Giannessi | 1 | 1
21 | (France) Hugo Grenier | 6 | 6

Second round
14 | (United States) Jack Sock | 6 | 7
(France) Constant Lestienne | 3 | 5
(Spain) Javier Barranco Cosano | 3 | 4
21 | (France) Hugo Grenier | 6 | 6

Qualifying competition
14 | (United States) Jack Sock | 7 | 7 | 6
21 | (France) Hugo Grenier | 5 | 5 | 4

=== Fifteenth qualifier ===
First round
15 | (Argentina) Camilo Ugo Carabelli | 6 | 2^{r}
(France) Alexandre Müller | 2 | 5
(France) Geoffrey Blancaneaux | 5 | 3
(Australia) Rinky Hijikata | 7 | 6
(Hungary) Máté Valkusz | 2 | 5
(Germany) Nicola Kuhn | 6 | 7
(Germany) Cedrik-Marcel Stebe | 7^{7} | 6
22 | (Italy) Franco Agamenone | 6^{2} | 4

Second round
(France) Alexandre Müller | 2 | 2
(Australia) Rinky Hijikata | 6 | 6
(Germany) Nicola Kuhn | 6 | 6
(Germany) Cedrik-Marcel Stebe | 3 | 2

Qualifying competition
(Australia) Rinky Hijikata | 4 | 6 | 5 | 6^{4}
(Germany) Nicola Kuhn | 6 | 3 | 7 | 7^{7}

=== Sixteenth qualifier ===
First round
16 | (Canada) Vasek Pospisil | 4 | 4
(Czech Republic) Dalibor Svrčina | 6 | 6
WC | (United Kingdom) Anton Matusevich | 3 | 4
(United States) Christian Harrison | 6 | 6
(Italy) Giulio Zeppieri | 6^{5} | 6 | 3
(Germany) Daniel Masur | 7^{7} | 4 | 6
(China) Zhang Zhizhen | 6 | 7
17 | (United States) Ernesto Escobedo | 4 | 5

Second round
(Czech Republic) Dalibor Svrčina | 6 | 3 | 6^{4}
(United States) Christian Harrison | 0 | 6 | 7^{10}
(Germany) Daniel Masur | 6 | 6
(China) Zhang Zhizhen | 2 | 1

Qualifying competition
(United States) Christian Harrison | 4 | 6 | 5 | 6 | 6
(Germany) Daniel Masur | 6 | 3 | 7 | 4 | 1
