= Luca Udvardy =

Hungarian tennis player (born 2005)

- Country (sports): Hungary
- Residence: Miami, Florida, US
- Born: 4 November 2005 (age 20) Balatonakarattya, Hungary
- Plays: Right-handed
- Prize money: $44,497

Singles
- Career record: 82–40
- Career titles: 5 ITF
- Highest ranking: No. 474 (2 February 2026)
- Current ranking: No. 649 (28 September 2026)

Grand Slam singles results
- Australian Open Junior: 1R (2023)
- French Open Junior: 2R (2022)
- Wimbledon Junior: F (2022)
- US Open Junior: 2R (2022)

Doubles
- Career record: 17–17
- Career titles: 2 ITF
- Highest ranking: No. 735 (21 April 2025)

Grand Slam doubles results
- Australian Open Junior: QF (2023)
- French Open Junior: 2R (2023)
- Wimbledon Junior: 1R (2022)
- US Open Junior: 2R (2022)
- Last updated on: 2 October 2026.

Luca Udvardy (born 4 November 2005) is a Hungarian professional tennis player. She has a career-high singles ranking by the WTA of No. 474, achieved on 2 February 2026.

Luca is the younger sister of Panna Udvardy who is also a professional tennis player.

Luca Udvardy has a career-high combined ITF junior ranking of No. 14, achieved on 31 October 2022.

== Career ==
Udvardy made her WTA Tour main-draw debut at the 2021 Budapest Grand Prix where she received a wildcard into the doubles tournament.

She finished runner-up in the 2022 Wimbledon girls' singles tournament, losing to Liv Hovde in the final.

== ITF Circuit finals ==
=== Singles: 6 (5 titles, 1 runner-up) ===
Legend W35 tournaments (1–0) W15 tournaments (4–1)	Finals by surface Clay (5–1)

Result	W–L	Date	Tournament	Tier	Surface	Opponent	Score
Win	1–0	Jun 2023	ITF Alkmaar, Netherlands	W15	Clay	(Sweden) Caijsa Hennemann	6–1, 7–5
Win	2–0	Jul 2023	ITF Savitaipale, Finland	W15	Clay	(Romania) Sabina Dadaciu	6–0, 6–2
Loss	2–1	Sep 2024	ITF Kuršumlijska Banja, Serbia	W15	Clay	(Serbia) Natalija Senić	4–6, 2–6
Win	3–1	Mar 2025	ITF Alaminos, Cyprus	W15	Clay	(Italy) Jessica Bertoldo	6–1, 7–5
Win	4–1	Jun 2025	ITF Osijek, Croatia	W15	Clay	(Slovakia) Eszter Méri	3–6, 6–2, 6–3
Win	5–1	Nov 2025	ITF Orlando, United States	W35	Clay	(Greece) Martha Matoula	6–3, 6–3

=== Doubles: 3 (2 titles, 1 runner-up) ===
Legend W75 tournaments (0–1) W15 tournaments (2–0)	Finals by surface Hard (1–0) Clay (1–1)

Result	W–L	Date	Tournament	Tier	Surface	Partner	Opponents	Score
Win	1–0	Feb 2023	ITF Sharm El Sheikh, Egypt	W15	Hard	(Norway) Emilie Lindh Gallagher	Aleksandra Pospelova; Nina Rudiukova	6–4, 5–7, [10–3]
Win	2–0	Jul 2023	ITF Savitaipale, Finland	W15	Clay	(Finland) Laura Hietaranta	(Poland) Weronika Baszak (Estonia) Anet Angelika Koskel	6–1, 6–2
Loss	2–1	Mar 2025	Székesfehérvár Open, Hungary	W75	Clay (i)	(Hungary) Panna Udvardy	(Romania) Irina Bara (Georgia (country)) Ekaterine Gorgodze	7–6^{(7)}, 3–6, [3–10]

== Junior finals ==
=== Grand Slam tournaments ===
==== Singles: 1 (runner-up) ====
Result	Year	Tournament	Surface	Opponent	Score
Loss	2022	Wimbledon	Grass	(United States) Liv Hovde	3–6, 4–6

=== ITF Junior Circuit ===
Legend
Grade A
Grade 1
Grade 2
Grade 4
Grade 5

==== Singles: 7 (2–5) ====
Result	W–L	Date	Tournament	Tier	Surface	Opponent	Score
Win	1–0	Nov 2019	ITF St. Johns, Antigua and Barbuda	Grade 5	Hard	(Canada) Hana Gamracy	6–4, 6–3
Loss	1–1	Sep 2020	ITF Doha, Qatar	Grade 4	Hard	(Greece) Dimitra Pavlou	3–6, 2–6
Loss	1–2	Sep 2020	ITF Tirana, Albania	Grade 5	Hard	(Turkey) Leyla Nilufer Elmas	4–6, 1–6
Loss	1–3	Oct 2020	ITF Ulcinj, Montenegro	Grade 4	Clay	(Serbia) Mia Ristić	3–6, 2–6
Loss	1–4	Jan 2021	ITF Nairobi, Kenya	Grade 4	Clay	(Kenya) Angella Okutoyi	1–6, 4–6
Win	2–4	Jan 2022	ITF Salinas, Ecuador	Grade 1	Hard	(Chinese Taipei) Madeleine Jessup	6–4, 7–6^{(7–4)}
Loss	2–5	Jul 2022	Wimbledon, UK	Grand Slam	Grass	(United States) Liv Hovde	3–6, 4–6

==== Doubles: 15 (10–5) ====
Result	W–L	Date	Tournament	Tier	Surface	Partner	Opponents	Score
Win	1–0	Nov 2019	ITF St. Johns, Antigua and Barbuda	Grade 5	Hard	(United States) Artemis Pados	(United States) Sifa Butcher (Canada) Hana Gamracy	6–4, 5–7, [10–7]
Loss	1–1	Nov 2019	ITF Llanos de Curundu, Panama	Grade 5	Clay	(Czech Republic) Rachel Heřmanova	(United States) Jennifer Kida (Dominican Republic) Ana Carmen Zamburek	3–6, 0–6
Loss	1–2	Feb 2020	ITF Kaarina, Finland	Grade 4	Hard (i)	(United Kingdom) Kristina Paskauskas	(Finland) Peppi Ramstedt (Finland) Stella Remander	0–6, 6–1, [6–10]
Loss	1–3	Sep 2020	ITF Larnaca, Cyprus	Grade 4	Hard	(Russia) Daria Frayman	(Greece) Despoina Mastrodima (Greece) Dimitra Pavlou	w/o
Win	2–3	Sep 2020	ITF Larnaca, Cyprus	Grade 4	Hard	(Cyprus) Maria Constantinou	(United Kingdom) Lara Bakhaya (United Kingdom) Lucy Webber	4–6, 6–2, [10–7]
Win	3–3	Sep 2020	ITF Tirana, Albania	Grade 5	Hard	(Turkey) Leyla Nilufer Elmas	(Italy) Diana De Simone (Bulgaria) Victoria Lazarova	6–0, 6–2
Win	4–3	Sep 2020	ITF Tirana, Albania	Grade 5	Hard	(Turkey) Leyla Nilufer Elmas	(Turkey) Nisa Bulut (Turkey) Ada Karabacak	4–6, 6–2, [11–9]
Win	5–3	Oct 2020	ITF Ulcinj, Montenegro	Grade 4	Clay	(France) Maëlie Monfils	(Russia) Alla Betina (Montenegro) Divna Ratković	0–4, 5–3, [10–6]
Loss	5–4	Apr 2021	ITF Haskovo, Bulgaria	Grade 2	Clay	(Spain) Raquel González Vilar	(Italy) Lisa Pigato (Italy) Arianna Zucchini	1–6, 6–3, [11–13]
Win	6–4	Jan 2022	ITF San José, Costa Rica	Grade 1	Hard	(Slovakia) Nikola Daubnerová	(South Africa) Gabriella Broadfoot (United States) Elisabeth Jones	2–6, 6–1, [11–9]
Win	7–4	Jan 2022	ITF Salinas, Ecuador	Grade 1	Hard	(Slovakia) Renáta Jamrichová	(United States) Daniella Ben-Abraham (China) Yichen Zhao	6–0, 6–0
Win	8–4	Feb 2022	ITF Lambaré, Paraguay	Grade 1	Clay	(Slovakia) Nina Vargová	(Slovakia) Nikola Daubnerová (Czech Republic) Amélie Šmejkalová	7–6^{(7–5)}, 6–1
Loss	8–5	Apr 2022	ITF Beaulieu-sur-Mer, France	Grade 1	Clay	(Slovakia) Renáta Jamrichová	(Russia) Alevtina Ibragimova (Poland) Malwina Rowińska	6–4, 5–7, [7–10]
Win	9–5	May 2022	ITF Santa Croce sull'Arno, Italy	Grade 1	Clay	(Czech Republic) Tereza Valentová	(Slovakia) Nikola Daubnerová (Switzerland) Céline Naef	6–4, 5–7, [10–6]
Win	10–5	Aug 2022	ITF Pretoria, South Africa	Grade A	Hard	(Belgium) Sofia Costoulas	(France) Yaroslava Bartashevich (Kazakhstan) Zhanel Rustemova	6–0, 6–3

== Top 5 highest rank wins ==
#	Tournament	Category	Start date	Surface	Rd	Opponent	Rank	Score	LUR
1	Székesfehérvár Open, Hungary	W75	10 March 2025	Clay	1R	Ekaterina Makarova	No. 233	7–6^{(3)}, 6–3	No. 722
2	Serbian Tennis Tour 2, Serbia	W75	23 September 2024	Clay	2R	(Romania) Cristina Dinu	No. 258	6–7^{(5)}, 6–3, 6–2	No. 963
3	Kuchyně Gorenje Prague Open, Czech Republic	W60	28 August 2023	Clay	2R	(United Kingdom) Sonay Kartal	No. 259	6–2, 7–5	No. 782
4	Bellinzona Ladies Open, Switzerland	W75	7 April 2025	Clay	1R	(Australia) Tina Smith	No. 325	6–4, 6–4	No. 608
5	ITF Alkmaar, Netherlands	W15	26 June 2023	Clay	F	(Sweden) Caijsa Hennemann	No. 361	6–1, 7–5	No. 1,156

- statistics correct as of 26 May 2025
