= Bor Artnak =

Slovenian tennis player (born 2004)

- Country (sports): Slovenia
- Born: 4 June 2004 (age 22) Trbovlje, Slovenia
- Height: 1.93 m (6 ft 4 in)
- Plays: Right-handed (two-handed backhand)
- College: ASU
- Coach: Gasper Vrhovec
- Prize money: US $94,538

Singles
- Career record: 5–5 (at ATP Tour level, Grand Slam level, and in Davis Cup)
- Career titles: 4 ITF
- Highest ranking: No. 373 (9 September 2024)
- Current ranking: No. 522 (9 November 2026)

Grand Slam singles results
- Australian Open Junior: 1R (2022)
- French Open Junior: 1R (2022)
- Wimbledon Junior: 3R (2022)

Doubles
- Career record: 1–0 (at ATP Tour level, Grand Slam level, and in Davis Cup)
- Career titles: 1 ITF
- Highest ranking: No. 865 (16 September 2024)
- Current ranking: No. 2,000 (9 November 2026)

Grand Slam doubles results
- Australian Open Junior: 2R (2022)
- French Open Junior: 1R (2022)
- Wimbledon Junior: 2R (2022)

Team competitions
- Davis Cup: 4–6
- Last updated on: 9 November 2026.

Bor Artnak (born 4 June 2004) is a Slovenian tennis player. He has a career high ATP singles ranking of world No. 373 achieved on 9 September 2024 and a doubles ranking of No. 865 achieved on 16 September 2024. He is currently the No. 1 Slovenian player. Artnak has won four ITF singles titles and one doubles title.

On the junior tour, he had a career high ITF combined ranking of No. 10, achieved on 16 May 2022. Artnak represents Slovenia at the Davis Cup, where he has a W/L record of 4–6.

== ATP Challenger and ITF Tour finals ==
=== Singles: 11 (5–6) ===
Legend ATP Challenger Tour (0–0) ITF World Tennis Tour (5–6)	Finals by surface Hard (0–2) Clay (5–4)

Result	W–L	Date	Tournament	Tier	Surface	Opponent	Score
Win	1–0	Jun 2022	M15 Sarajevo, Bosnia and Herzegovina	World Tennis Tour	Clay	(Serbia) Stefan Popović	6–1, 7–5
Loss	1–1	Oct 2022	M15 Sharm El Sheikh, Egypt	World Tennis Tour	Hard	(Sweden) Leo Borg	6–3, 5–7, 4–6
Win	2–1	Jul 2023	M15 Novi Sad, Serbia	World Tennis Tour	Clay	(Bosnia and Herzegovina) Andrej Nedić	6–0, 7–6^{(7–2)}
Loss	2–2	Nov 2023	M15 Sharm El Sheikh, Egypt	World Tennis Tour	Hard	(Ukraine) Vadym Ursu	6–1, 1–6, 2–6
Loss	2–3	May 2024	M15 Vrhnika, Slovenia	World Tennis Tour	Clay	(Brazil) João Eduardo Schiessl	7–6^{(7-4)}, 0–6, 0–6
Win	3–3	Jul 2024	M15 Litija, Slovenia	World Tennis Tour	Clay	(Germany) Peter Heller	6–2, 6–3
Loss	3–4	Jul 2024	M25 Brazzaville, Congo	World Tennis Tour	Clay	(Portugal) Gonçalo Oliveira	4–6, 2–6
Win	4–4	Jun 2024	M15 Store, Slovenia	World Tennis Tour	Clay	(Italy) Gianluca Cadenasso	6–3, 6–1
Loss	4–5	Aug 2025	M25 Brazzaville, Congo	World Tennis Tour	Clay	(France) Florent Bax	3–6, 3–6
Loss	4–6	Aug 2025	M25 Brazzaville, Congo	World Tennis Tour	Clay	(France) Florent Bax	3–6, 7–6^{(7–5)}, 6–7^{(6–8)}
Win	5–6	May 2026	M15 Litija, Slovenia	World Tennis Tour	Clay	(Italy) Giuspee La Vela	6–1, 6–1

=== Doubles: 1 (1–0) ===
Legend ATP Challenger Tour (0–0) ITF World Tennis Tour (1–0)	Finals by surface Hard (1–0) Clay (0–0)

Result	W–L	Date	Tournament	Tier	Surface	Partner	Opponent	Score
Win	1–0	Oct 2023	M25 Al Zahra, Kuwait	World Tennis Tour	Hard	(Slovenia) Matic Dimic	(Ukraine) Igor Dudun (Slovakia) Samuel Puskar	6-3, 6–7^{(5–7)}, [10–6]
