= Rose Marie Nijkamp =

Dutch tennis player (born 2006)

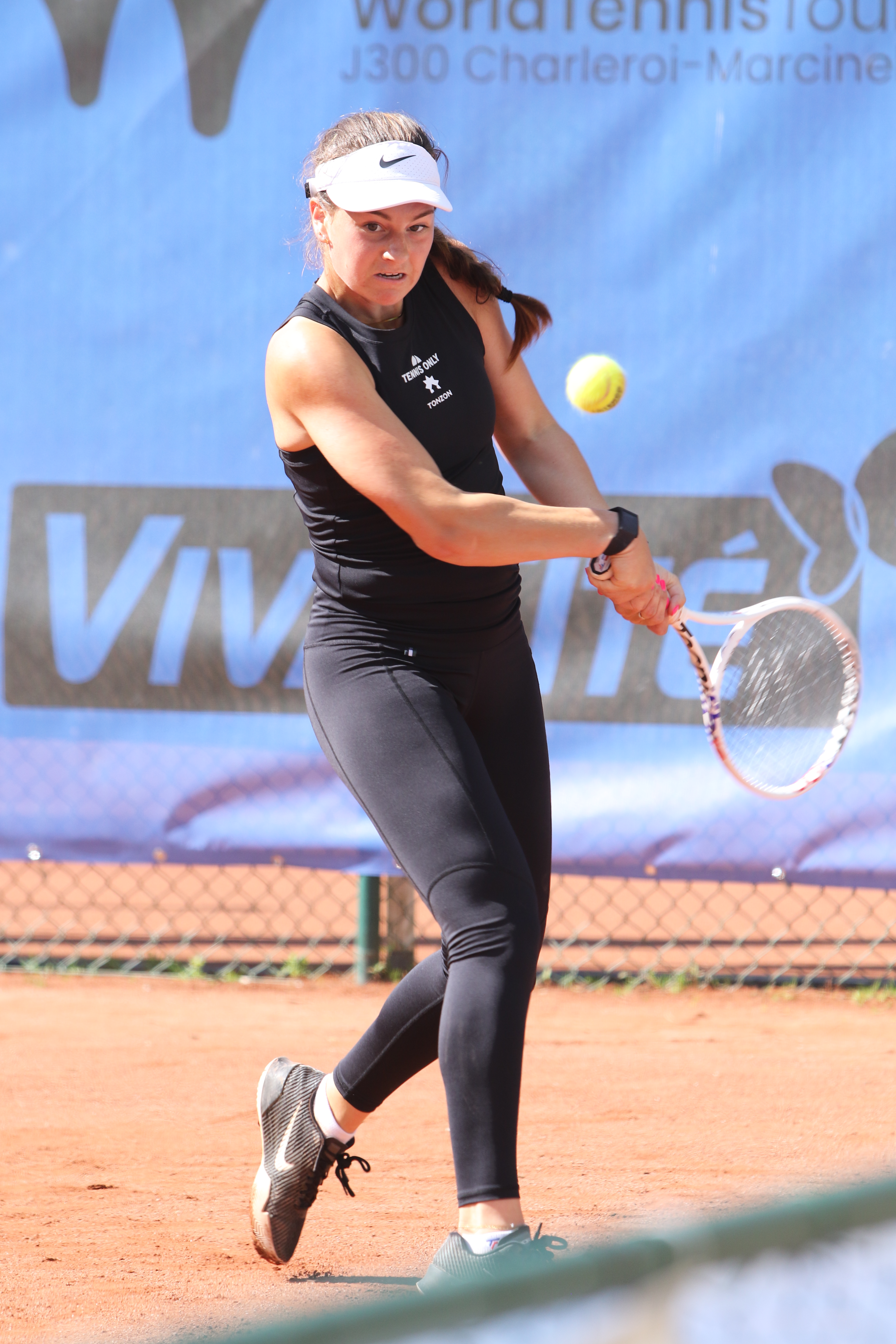
- 31 May 2024, Astrid Bowl doubles final
- Country (sports): Netherlands
- Born: 3 February 2006 (age 20) Apeldoorn, Netherlands
- Height: 1.69 m (5 ft 6 1/2 in)
- Plays: Right-handed
- Prize money: $24,641

Singles
- Career record: 57–38
- Career titles: 2 ITF
- Highest ranking: No. 655 (12 October 2026)
- Current ranking: No. 661 (19 October 2026)

Doubles
- Career record: 53–21
- Career titles: 5 ITF
- Highest ranking: No. 502 (19 October 2026)
- Current ranking: No. 502 (19 October 2026)
- Last updated on: 24 October 2026.

Rose Marie Nijkamp (born 3 February 2006) is a Dutch tennis player. She has career-high rankings by the WTA of 655 in singles and 502 in doubles, achieved in October 2026.

== Career ==
=== Juniors ===
Nijkamp has a career-high ITF junior combined ranking of No. 31, achieved on 10 June 2024. She won the girls' doubles title at the 2022 Wimbledon Championships title with her Kenyan partner, Angella Okutoyi.

=== Professional ===
Nijkamp has won five doubles titles and two titles in singles on the ITF World Tour.

== ITF Circuit finals ==
=== Singles: 3 (2 titles, 1 runner-up) ===
Legend W35 tournaments W15 tournaments (2–1)	Finals by surface Clay (2–0) Hard (0–1)

Result	W–L	Date	Tournament	Tier	Surface	Opponent	Score
Win	1–0	Jun 2025	ITF Alkmaar, Netherlands	W15	Clay	(Netherlands) Isis Louise van den Broek	1–6, 6–3, 6–4
Win	2–0	Oct 2025	ITF Sumter, United States	W15	Clay	(United States) Carson Tanguilig	6–2, 7–5
Loss	2–1	Sep 2026	ITF Nashville, United States	W15	Hard	(Australia) Astra Sharma	3–6, 1–6

=== Doubles: 13 (5 titles, 8 runner-ups) ===
Legend W35 tournaments (1–1) W15 tournaments (4–7)	Finals by surface Hard (2–2) Clay (3–6)

Result	W–L	Date	Tournament	Tier	Surface	Partner	Opponents	Score
Loss	0–1	Jun 2023	ITF Alkmaar, Netherlands	W15	Clay	(Netherlands) Isis Louise van den Broek	(Belgium) Tilwith Di Girolami (United States) Chiara Scholl	2–6, 1–6
Loss	0–2	Aug 2023	ITF Eindhoven, Netherlands	W15	Clay	(Netherlands) Isis Louise van den Broek	(Netherlands) Joy de Zeeuw (Netherlands) Sarah van Emst	1–6, 6–4, [8–10]
Win	1–2	Nov 2023	ITF Monastir, Tunisia	W15	Hard	(Romania) Mara Gae	(China) Yang Yidi (China) Yuan Chengyiyi	3–6, 6–3, [11–9]
Loss	1–3	Jul 2024	ITF Kuršumlijska Banja, Serbia	W15	Clay	(Netherlands) Isis Louise van den Broek	Evgeniya Burdina (Serbia) Draginja Vuković	walkover
Win	2–3	Sep 2024	ITF Haren, Netherlands	W15	Clay	(Netherlands) Isis Louise van den Broek	(Germany) Laura Böhner (Germany) Mina Hodzic	4–6, 7–6^{(4)}, [10–6]
Win	3–3	Sep 2024	ITF Dijon, France	W15	Clay	(Netherlands) Isis Louise van den Broek	(Germany) Fabienne Gettwart (Germany) Mina Hodzic	7–6^{(1)}, 6–4
Loss	3–4	Oct 2024	ITF Sant Vicenç de Torelló, Spain	W15	Hard	(Netherlands) Isis Louise van den Broek	(Netherlands) Joy de Zeeuw (Spain) Ruth Roura Llaverias	6–2, 3–6, [9–11]
Loss	3–5	Oct 2024	ITF Villena, Spain	W15	Hard	(Netherlands) Isis Louise van den Broek	(Netherlands) Joy de Zeeuw (Hungary) Adrienn Nagy	walkover
Loss	3–6	Jun 2025	ITF Alkmaar, Netherlands	W15	Clay	(Netherlands) Isis Louise van den Broek	(Netherlands) Loes Ebeling Koning (Netherlands) Sarah van Emst	6–7^{(4)}, 3–6
Win	4–6	Oct 2025	ITF Norman, United States	W35	Hard	(United States) Savannah Broadus	(Spain) Maria Berlanga Bandera (Mexico) Julia García Ruiz	6–2, 6–3
Win	5–6	Apr 2026	ITF Orlando, United States	W15	Clay	(Ukraine) Anita Sahdiieva	(Mexico) Midori Castillo Meza (United States) Brandelyn Fulgenzi	6–7^{(4)}, 6–4, [10–6]
Loss	5–7	Jul 2026	ITF Krško, Slovenia	W15	Clay	(France) Eleejah Inisan	(Czech Republic) Veronika Kulhavá (Italy) Federica Trevisan	3–6, 1–6
Loss	5–8	Jul 2026	ITF Gentofte, Denmark	W35	Hard	(Germany) Marie Vogt	(Denmark) Vilma Krebs Hyllested (Denmark) Rebecca Munk Mortensen	6–3, 1–6, [4–10]

=== Junior Grand Slam tournament finals ===
==== Doubles: 1 (title) ====
Result	Year	Tournament	Surface	Partner	Opponents	Score
Win	2022	(United Kingdom) Wimbledon	Grass	(Kenya) Angella Okutoyi	(Canada) Kayla Cross (Canada) Victoria Mboko	3–6, 6–4, [11–9]
