= 2022 Wimbledon Championships – Girls' singles =

Girls' singles
- 2022 Wimbledon Championships

Final
- Champion: (United States) Liv Hovde
- Runner-up: (Hungary) Luca Udvardy
- Score: 6–3, 6–4

Events
Singles	men	women		boys	girls
Doubles	men	women	mixed	boys	girls
WC Singles	men	women	quad
WC Doubles	men	women	quad
Legends	men	women	mixed
14&U Singles	boys	girls
← 2021 ·	Wimbledon Championships	· 2023 →

Liv Hovde defeated Luca Udvardy in the final, 6–3, 6–4 to win the girls' singles title at the 2022 Wimbledon Championships.

Ane Mintegi del Olmo was the defending champion, but was no longer eligible to participate in junior events.

== Seeds ==
1. (United States) Liv Hovde (champion)
2. (Switzerland) Céline Naef (third round)
3. (Czech Republic) Nikola Bartůňková (quarterfinals)
4. (Slovakia) Nikola Daubnerová (second round)
5. (Canada) Victoria Mboko (semifinals)
6. (Australia) Taylah Preston (second round)
7. (Hungary) Luca Udvardy (final)
8. (United States) Qavia Lopez (second round, withdrew)

9. (Argentina) Luciana Moyano (first round)
10. (Canada) Annabelle Xu (third round)
11. (Denmark) Johanne Svendsen (second round)
12. (Czech Republic) Tereza Valentová (first round)
13. (Canada) Kayla Cross (third round)
14. (Croatia) Lucija Ćirić Bagarić (first round)
15. (Argentina) Lucía Peyre (second round)
16. (Czech Republic) Linda Klimovičová (semifinals)

Click on the seed number of a player to go to their draw section.

== Draw ==
=== Key ===
- Q = Qualifier
- WC = Wild card
- LL = Lucky loser
- Alt = Alternate
- ITF = ITF entry
- PR = Protected ranking
- SR = Special ranking
- SE = Special exempt
- JE = Junior exempt
- JR = Junior Accelerator Programme entrant
- CO = College Accelerator Programme entrant
- NG = Next Gen Accelerator Program entrant
- w/o = Walkover
- r = Retired
- d = Defaulted

=== Finals ===
Quarterfinals
1	(United States) Liv Hovde	6	6
(Germany) Ella Seidel	3	2
Q	(South Africa) Isabella Kruger	6	5	4
5	(Canada) Victoria Mboko	0	7	6
7	(Hungary) Luca Udvardy	6	6
3	(Czech Republic) Nikola Bartůňková	3	2
WC	(United Kingdom) Jasmine Conway	6	2	1
16	(Czech Republic) Linda Klimovičová	2	6	6

Semifinals
1	(United States) Liv Hovde	6	6
5	(Canada) Victoria Mboko	4	3
7	(Hungary) Luca Udvardy	6	3	6
16	(Czech Republic) Linda Klimovičová	3	6	0

Final
1	(United States) Liv Hovde	6	6
7	(Hungary) Luca Udvardy	3	4

=== Top half ===
==== Section 1 ====
First round
1	(United States) Liv Hovde	6	6
LL	(Brazil) Ana Candiotto	4	1
(Belgium) Amelia Waligora	6^{0}	4
(Ukraine) Anastasiya Lopata	7^{7}	6
(Slovakia) Irina Balus	7	6
(Serbia) Andrea Obradović	5	2
(Switzerland) Chelsea Fontenel	1	6	6^{9}
13	(Canada) Kayla Cross	6	4	7^{11}
12	(Czech Republic) Tereza Valentová	1	3
(Japan) Sayaka Ishii	6	6
(Germany) Ella Seidel	4	7^{7}	7^{13}
(Peru) Lucciana Pérez Alarcón	6	6^{1}	6^{11}
Q	(Chinese Taipei) Li Yu-yun	6	6
WC	(United Kingdom) Hannah Klugman	3	1
LL	(Netherlands) Isis Louise van den Broek	5	5
6	(Australia) Taylah Preston	7	7

Second round
1	(United States) L Hovde	6	6
(Ukraine) A Lopata	1	0
(Slovakia) I Balus	4	3
13	(Canada) K Cross	6	6
(Japan) S Ishii	4	6^{4}
(Germany) E Seidel	6	7^{7}
Q	(Chinese Taipei) Y-y Li	7^{7}	6^{3}	6
6	(Australia) T Preston	6^{5}	7^{7}	3

Third round
1	(United States) L Hovde	4	7	6
13	(Canada) K Cross	6	5	4
(Germany) E Seidel	7	6
Q	(Chinese Taipei) Y-y Li	5	4

Quarterfinals
1	(United States) L Hovde	6	6
(Germany) E Seidel	3	2

==== Section 2 ====
First round
4	(Slovakia) Nikola Daubnerová	1	6	7^{11}
(Czech Republic) Dominika Šalková	6	4	6^{9}
Q	(South Africa) Isabella Kruger	7	5	6
(United States) Sonya Macavei	5	7	2
WC	(United Kingdom) Mingge Xu	7^{7}	6
(Germany) Carolina Kuhl	6^{5}	3
(Thailand) Lanlana Tararudee	7	3	2
15	(Argentina) Lucía Peyre	5	6	6
11	(Denmark) Johanne Svendsen	6	6
(United States) Mia Slama	3	3
(Japan) Sara Saito	3	4
(Poland) Olivia Lincer	6	6
(Czech Republic) Julie Štruplová	5	1
WC	(United Kingdom) Ella McDonald	7	6
Q	(United Kingdom) Sofia Johnson	6	5	1
5	(Canada) Victoria Mboko	3	7	6

Second round
4	(Slovakia) N Daubnerová	4	7^{7}	2
Q	(South Africa) I Kruger	6	6^{4}	6
WC	(United Kingdom) M Xu	6	6
15	(Argentina) L Peyre	2	0
11	(Denmark) J Svendsen	6^{0}	5
(Poland) O Lincer	7^{7}	7
WC	(United Kingdom) E McDonald	4	6	0
5	(Canada) V Mboko	6	3	6

Third round
Q	(South Africa) I Kruger	6	6
WC	(United Kingdom) M Xu	4	3
(Poland) O Lincer	0	7^{10}	4
5	(Canada) V Mboko	6	6^{8}	6

Quarterfinals
Q	(South Africa) I Kruger	6	5	4
5	(Canada) V Mboko	0	7	6

=== Bottom half ===
==== Section 3 ====
First round
7	(Hungary) Luca Udvardy	6	2	6
Q	(United Kingdom) Daniela Piani	2	6	2
(United States) Alexis Blokhina	6	6
Q	(Kazakhstan) Sandugash Kenzhibayeva	3	3
WC	(United Kingdom) Talia Neilson Gatenby	6	6
(Slovakia) Nina Vargová	4	4
(Czech Republic) Kristýna Tomajková	6^{5}	6	3
10	(Canada) Annabelle Xu	7^{7}	1	6
14	(Croatia) Lucija Ćirić Bagarić	6	5	3
(Netherlands) Rose Marie Nijkamp	4	7	6
(Italy) Georgia Pedone	7	6
(Belgium) Amelie Van Impe	5	3
Q	(Poland) Weronika Ewald	6	2	6
WC	(United Kingdom) Hephzibah Oluwadare	4	6	4
(Turkey) Ayşegül Mert	0	4
3	(Czech Republic) Nikola Bartůňková	6	6

Second round
7	(Hungary) L Udvardy	6	3	6
(United States) A Blokhina	2	6	3
WC	(United Kingdom) T Neilson Gatenby	4	6	3
10	(Canada) A Xu	6	3	6
(Netherlands) RM Nijkamp	6	6
(Italy) G Pedone	4	4
Q	(Poland) W Ewald	5	1
3	(Czech Republic) N Bartůňková	7	6

Third round
7	(Hungary) L Udvardy	6	7^{7}
10	(Canada) A Xu	4	6^{3}
(Netherlands) RM Nijkamp	1	3
3	(Czech Republic) N Bartůňková	6	6

Quarterfinals
7	(Hungary) L Udvardy	6	6
3	(Czech Republic) N Bartůňková	3	2

==== Section 4 ====
First round
8	(United States) Qavia Lopez	6	7
(Bulgaria) Denislava Glushkova	1	5
(Japan) Hayu Kinoshita	6	7^{7}
Q	(United States) Kaitlin Quevedo	3	6^{3}
(Slovakia) Renáta Jamrichová	4	5
WC	(United Kingdom) Jasmine Conway	6	7
Q	(Slovenia) Ela Nala Milić	6	3	6
9	(Argentina) Luciana Moyano	1	6	1
16	(Czech Republic) Linda Klimovičová	6	7
(Greece) Michaela Laki	2	5
(Germany) Joëlle Steur	4	6	4
WC	(United Kingdom) Isabelle Lacy	6	4	6
(Canada) Mia Kupres	6	6
(Kenya) Angella Okutoyi	3	2
WC	(United Kingdom) Sarah Tatu	1	3
2	(Switzerland) Céline Naef	6	6

Second round
8	(United States) Q Lopez
(Japan) H Kinoshita	w/o
WC	(United Kingdom) J Conway	6	6
Q	(Slovenia) EN Milić	3	0
16	(Czech Republic) L Klimovičová	6	6
WC	(United Kingdom) I Lacy	0	2
(Canada) M Kupres	2	4
2	(Switzerland) C Naef	6	6

Third round
(Japan) H Kinoshita	4	1
WC	(United Kingdom) J Conway	6	6
16	(Czech Republic) L Klimovičová	6	1	6
2	(Switzerland) C Naef	2	6	3

Quarterfinals
WC	(United Kingdom) J Conway	6	2	1
16	(Czech Republic) L Klimovičová	2	6	6

== Qualifying ==
=== Seeds ===
1. (Chinese Taipei) Li Yu-yun (qualified)
2. (Kazakhstan) Aruzhan Sagandikova (first round)
3. (Slovenia) Ela Nala Milić (qualified)
4. (Netherlands) Rose Marie Nijkamp (moved to main draw)
5. (Poland) Weronika Ewald (qualified)
6. (Netherlands) Isis Louise van den Broek (qualifying competition, lucky loser)
7. (Chinese Taipei) Madeleine Jessup (first round)
8. (United States) Kaitlin Quevedo (qualified)
9. (Kazakhstan) Sandugash Kenzhibayeva (qualified)
10. (Hungary) Panna Bartha (first round)
11. (India) Shruti Ahlawat (first round)
12. (United States) Theadora Rabman (qualifying competition)
13. (Republic of Ireland) Celine Simunyu (first round)
14. (Poland) Malwina Rowińska (first round)
15. (Denmark) Natacha Schou (first round)
16. (Germany) Marie Vogt (qualifying competition)

=== Qualifiers ===
1. (Chinese Taipei) Li Yu-yun
2. (United Kingdom) Sofia Johnson
3. (Slovenia) Ela Nala Milić
4. (United Kingdom) Daniela Piani
5. (Poland) Weronika Ewald
6. (Kazakhstan) Sandugash Kenzhibayeva
7. (South Africa) Isabella Kruger
8. (United States) Kaitlin Quevedo

=== Lucky losers ===
1. (Netherlands) Isis Louise van den Broek
2. (Brazil) Ana Candiotto

=== Draw ===
==== First qualifier ====
First round
1	(Chinese Taipei) Li Yu-yun	2	6	[10]
WC	(United Kingdom) Jaquelyn Ogunwale	6	3	[5]
(Brazil) Ana Candiotto	6	6
13	(Republic of Ireland) Celine Simunyu	4	3

Qualifying competition
1	(Chinese Taipei) Li Yu-yun	6	6
(Brazil) Ana Candiotto	3	1

==== Second qualifier ====
First round
2	(Kazakhstan) Aruzhan Sagandikova	5	2
WC	(United Kingdom) Sofia Johnson	7	6
(South Africa) Gabriella Broadfoot	7	6
15	(Denmark) Natacha Schou	5	4

Qualifying competition
WC	(United Kingdom) Sofia Johnson	2	6	[10]
(South Africa) Gabriella Broadfoot	6	4	[6]

==== Third qualifier ====
First round
3	(Slovenia) Ela Nala Milić	7	6
(Italy) Anna Paradisi	5	1
(Kazakhstan) Zhanel Rustemova	6	6
11	(India) Shruti Ahlawat	1	1

Qualifying competition
3	(Slovenia) Ela Nala Milić	6	6
(Kazakhstan) Zhanel Rustemova	4	3

==== Fourth qualifier ====
First round
Alt	(United Kingdom) Emma Cohen	5	3
(France) Mathilde Ngijol-Carré	7	6
WC	(United Kingdom) Daniela Piani	6	6
10	(Hungary) Panna Bartha	4	4

Qualifying competition
(France) Mathilde Ngijol-Carré	6	3	[5]
WC	(United Kingdom) Daniela Piani	4	6	[10]

==== Fifth qualifier ====
First round
5	(Poland) Weronika Ewald	6	6
WC	(United Kingdom) Millie Skelton	0	2
(Japan) Honoka Umeda	3	1
16	(Germany) Marie Vogt	6	6

Qualifying competition
5	(Poland) Weronika Ewald	6	3	[12]
16	(Germany) Marie Vogt	4	6	[10]

==== Sixth qualifier ====
First round
6	(Netherlands) Isis Louise van den Broek	6	6
(Canada) Naomi Xu	1	4
WC	(United Kingdom) Ruby Cooling	7^{7}	3	[7]
9	(Kazakhstan) Sandugash Kenzhibayeva	6^{5}	6	[10]

Qualifying competition
6	(Netherlands) Isis Louise van den Broek	1	7	[8]
9	(Kazakhstan) Sandugash Kenzhibayeva	6	5	[10]

==== Seventh qualifier ====
First round
7	(Chinese Taipei) Madeleine Jessup	2	1
(South Africa) Isabella Kruger	6	6
(United Kingdom) Ellie Blackford	4	3
12	(United States) Theadora Rabman	6	6

Qualifying competition
(South Africa) Isabella Kruger	6	6
12	(United States) Theadora Rabman	0	2

==== Eighth qualifier ====
First round
8	(United States) Kaitlin Quevedo	6	2	[10]
(Italy) Denise Valente	4	6	[6]
WC	(United Kingdom) Given Roach	6	6
14	(Poland) Malwina Rowińska	2	2

Qualifying competition
8	(United States) Kaitlin Quevedo	6	6
WC	(United Kingdom) Given Roach	3	2
