= 2022 Wimbledon Championships – Wheelchair women's singles =

Tennis championship

Wheelchair women's singles
- 2022 Wimbledon Championships

Final
- Champion: (Netherlands) Diede de Groot
- Runner-up: (Japan) Yui Kamiji
- Score: 6–4, 6–2

Details
- Draw: 8
- Seeds: 2

Events
Singles	men	women		boys	girls
Doubles	men	women	mixed	boys	girls
WC Singles	men	women	quad
WC Doubles	men	women	quad
Legends	men	women	mixed
14&U Singles	boys	girls
← 2021 ·	Wimbledon Championships	· 2023 →

Defending champion Diede de Groot defeated Yui Kamiji in the final, 6–4, 6–2 to win the ladies' singles wheelchair tennis title at the 2022 Wimbledon Championships. It was the third step in an eventual Grand Slam for de Groot, and her seventh consecutive major singles title. Kamiji was attempting to complete the career Grand Slam.

== Seeds ==
1. (Netherlands) Diede de Groot (champion)
2. (Japan) Yui Kamiji (final)

== Draw ==
=== Key ===
- Q = Qualifier
- WC = Wild card
- LL = Lucky loser
- Alt = Alternate
- ITF = ITF entry
- PR = Protected ranking
- SR = Special ranking
- SE = Special exempt
- JE = Junior exempt
- JR = Junior Accelerator Programme entrant
- CO = College Accelerator Programme entrant
- NG = Next Gen Accelerator Program entrant
- w/o = Walkover
- r = Retired
- d = Defaulted

=== Finals ===
Quarterfinals
1	(Netherlands) Diede de Groot	6	6
(United States) Dana Mathewson	1	1
(United Kingdom) Lucy Shuker	2	2
WC	(Japan) Momoko Ohtani	6	6
(Netherlands) Aniek van Koot	2	2
(Netherlands) Jiske Griffioen	6	6
(South Africa) Kgothatso Montjane	3	3
2	(Japan) Yui Kamiji	6	6

Semifinals
1	(Netherlands) Diede de Groot	6	6
WC	(Japan) Momoko Ohtani	1	0
(Netherlands) Jiske Griffioen	1	2
2	(Japan) Yui Kamiji	6	6

Final
1	(Netherlands) Diede de Groot	6	6
2	(Japan) Yui Kamiji	4	2

== Sources ==
- Entry List
- Draw
- ITF Preview
