= 2022 Wimbledon Championships – Wheelchair women's doubles =

Tennis championship

Wheelchair women's doubles
- 2022 Wimbledon Championships

Final
- Champions: (Japan) Yui Kamiji (United States) Dana Mathewson
- Runners-up: (Netherlands) Diede de Groot (Netherlands) Aniek van Koot
- Score: 6–1, 7–5

Events
Singles	men	women		boys	girls
Doubles	men	women	mixed	boys	girls
WC Singles	men	women	quad
WC Doubles	men	women	quad
Legends	men	women	mixed
14&U Singles	boys	girls
← 2021 ·	Wimbledon Championships	· 2023 →

Defending champion Yui Kamiji and her partner Dana Mathewson defeated Diede de Groot and Aniek van Koot in the final, 6–1, 7–5 to win the ladies' doubles wheelchair tennis title at the 2022 Wimbledon Championships.

Kamiji and Jordanne Whiley were the reigning champions, but Whiley retired from professional wheelchair tennis in November 2021.

== Seeds ==
1. (Netherlands) Diede de Groot / (Netherlands) Aniek van Koot (final)
2. (South Africa) Kgothatso Montjane / (United Kingdom) Lucy Shuker (semifinals)

== Draw ==
=== Key ===
- Q = Qualifier
- WC = Wild card
- LL = Lucky loser
- Alt = Alternate
- ITF = ITF entry
- PR = Protected ranking
- SR = Special ranking
- SE = Special exempt
- JE = Junior exempt
- JR = Junior Accelerator Programme entrant
- CO = College Accelerator Programme entrant
- NG = Next Gen Accelerator Program entrant
- w/o = Walkover
- r = Retired
- d = Defaulted

=== Finals ===
Semifinals
1	(Netherlands) Diede de Groot (Netherlands) Aniek van Koot	7	7
(Netherlands) Jiske Griffioen (Japan) Momoko Ohtani	5	5
(Japan) Yui Kamiji (United States) Dana Mathewson	6	6
2	(South Africa) Kgothatso Montjane (United Kingdom) Lucy Shuker	4	2

Final
1	(Netherlands) Diede de Groot (Netherlands) Aniek van Koot	1	5
(Japan) Yui Kamiji (United States) Dana Mathewson	6	7

== Sources ==
- Entry List
- Draw
