= 2022 Wimbledon Championships – Wheelchair men's doubles =

Tennis championship

Wheelchair men's doubles
- 2022 Wimbledon Championships

Final
- Champions: (Argentina) Gustavo Fernandez (Japan) Shingo Kunieda
- Runners-up: (United Kingdom) Alfie Hewett (United Kingdom) Gordon Reid
- Score: 6–3, 6–1

Details
- Draw: 4
- Seeds: 2

Events
Singles	men	women		boys	girls
Doubles	men	women	mixed	boys	girls
WC Singles	men	women	quad
WC Doubles	men	women	quad
Legends	men	women	mixed
14&U Singles	boys	girls
← 2021 ·	Wimbledon Championships	· 2023 →

Gustavo Fernández and Shingo Kunieda defeated the defending champions Alfie Hewett and Gordon Reid in the final, 6–3, 6–1 to win the gentlemen's doubles wheelchair tennis title at the 2022 Wimbledon Championships. Fernandez and Kunieda's victory ended Hewett and Reid's streak of t10 consecutive major titles.

== Seeds ==
1. (United Kingdom) Alfie Hewett / (United Kingdom) Gordon Reid (final)
2. (Argentina) Gustavo Fernández / (Japan) Shingo Kunieda (champions)

== Draw ==
=== Key ===
- Q = Qualifier
- WC = Wild card
- LL = Lucky loser
- Alt = Alternate
- ITF = ITF entry
- PR = Protected ranking
- SR = Special ranking
- SE = Special exempt
- JE = Junior exempt
- JR = Junior Accelerator Programme entrant
- CO = College Accelerator Programme entrant
- NG = Next Gen Accelerator Program entrant
- w/o = Walkover
- r = Retired
- d = Defaulted

=== Finals ===
Semifinals
1	(United Kingdom) Alfie Hewett (United Kingdom) Gordon Reid	6	1	7^{10}
(Netherlands) Tom Egberink (Belgium) Joachim Gérard	3	6	6^{7}
(Japan) Tokito Oda (France) Nicolas Peifer	4	2
2	(Argentina) Gustavo Fernández (Japan) Shingo Kunieda	6	6

Final
1	(United Kingdom) Alfie Hewett (United Kingdom) Gordon Reid	3	1
2	(Argentina) Gustavo Fernández (Japan) Shingo Kunieda	6	6

== Sources ==
- Entry List
- Draw
