= 2022 Wimbledon Championships – Boys' 14&U singles =

Boys' 14&U singles
- 2022 Wimbledon Championships

Final
- Champion: (South Korea) Se Hyuk Cho
- Runner-up: (United States) Carel Aubriel Ngounoue
- Score: 7–6^{(7–5)}, 6–3

Events
Singles	men	women		boys	girls
Doubles	men	women	mixed	boys	girls
WC Singles	men	women	quad
WC Doubles	men	women	quad
14&U Singles	boys	girls
Legends	men	women	mixed
- Wimbledon Championships

This was the inaugural 14 and under boys event at Wimbledon. This event was created so young players from around the world could have an early experience of playing on Wimbledon's grass. In its debut year South Korea's Se Hyuk Cho beat Carel Aubriel Ngounoue of the United States to claim the title.

== Format ==
The first phase of the tournament saw four round-robin groups compete. The winners of each group advanced to the semi-finals. The rest competed in a consolation play-off tournament.

== Draw ==
=== Final ===
Semifinals
A1	(Bulgaria) Ivan Ivanov [1]	6^{5}	6	[9]
D4	(South Korea) Se Hyuk Cho [5]	7^{7}	1	[11]
C1	(United States) Carel Aubriel Ngounoue [3]	3	6	[11]
B1	(Romania) Matei Todoran [2]	6	4	[9]

Final
D4	(South Korea) Se Hyuk Cho [5]	7^{7}	6
C1	(United States) Carel Aubriel Ngounoue [3]	6^{5}	3

=== Group A ===
		(Bulgaria) Ivanov [1]	(Argentina) Pagani	(Morocco) Missoum	(United Kingdom) Ceban [8]	RR; W–L	Set; W–L	Game; W–L	Standings
A1	(Bulgaria) Ivan Ivanov [1]		4–6, 6–3, [10–8]	1–6, 6–1, [10–5]	6–4, 6–4	3–0	6–2	31–24	1
A2	(Argentina) Dante Pagani	6–4, 3–6, [8–10]		6–2, 6–1	3–6, 2–6	1–2	3–4	26–26	3
A3	(Morocco) Ali Missoum	6–1, 1–6, [5–10]	2–6, 1–6		6–4, 1–6, [6–10]	0–3	2–6	17–31	4
A4	(United Kingdom) Mark Ceban [8]	4–6, 4–6	6–3, 6–2	4–6, 6–1, [10–6]		2–1	4–3	31–24	2

=== Group B ===
		(Romania) Todoran [2]	(Argentina) Chelia	(Northern Mariana Islands) Lam	(United States) Hance [7]	RR; W–L	Set; W–L	Game; W–L	Standings
B1	(Romania) Matei Todoran [2]		6–2 6–2	6–1, 6–2	3–6, 6–3, [10–4]	3–0	6–1	34–16	1
B2	(Argentina) Benjamin Chelia	2–6, 2–6		6–1, 6–0	0–6, 0–6	1–2	2–4	16–25	3
B3	(Northern Mariana Islands) La Hunn Lam	1–6, 2–6	1–6, 0–6		0–6, 0–6	0–3	0–6	4–36	4
B4	(United States) Keaton Hance [7]	6–3, 3–6, [4–10]	6–0, 6–0	6–0, 6–0		2–1	5–2	33–10	2

=== Group C ===
		(United States) Ngounoue [3]	(Jordan) Alqurneh	(Brazil) Dietrich	(Australia) Dembo [6]	RR; W–L	Set; W–L	Game; W–L	Standings
C1	(United States) Carel Aubriel Ngounoue [3]		6–0, 6–0	6–3, 6–2	6–0, 6–1	3–0	6–0	36–6	1
C2	(Jordan) Malek Alqurneh	0–6, 0–6		6–3, 3–6, [10–3]	0–6, 3–6	1–2	2–5	13–33	3
C3	(Brazil) Pedro Dietrich	3–6, 2–6	3–6, 6–3, [3–10]		1–6, 4–6	0–3	1–6	19–34	4
C4	(Australia) Jake Dembo [6]	0–6, 1–6	6–0, 6–3	6–1, 6–4		2–1	4–2	25–20	2

=== Group D ===
		(Austria) Heidlmair [4]	(United Kingdom) Channon	(Mexico) Schtulmann	(South Korea) Cho [5]	RR; W–L	Set; W–L	Game; W–L	Standings
D1	(Austria) Maximilian Heidlmair [4]		6–1, 6–4	6–1, 6–3	1–6, 1–6	2–1	4–2	26–21	2
D2	(United Kingdom) Liam Channon	1–6, 4–6		6–4, 7–6^{(7–4)}	0–6, 6–7^{(2–7)}	1–2	2–4	24–35	3
D3	(Mexico) Mauricio Schtulmann	1–6, 3–6	4–6, 6–7^{(4–7)}		2–6, 3–6	0–3	0–6	19–37	4
D4	(South Korea) Se Hyuk Cho [5]	6–1, 6–1	6–0, 7–6^{(7–2)}	6–2, 6–3		3–0	6–0	37–13	1

Standings are determined by: 1. number of wins; 2. number of matches played; 3. in two-players-ties, head-to-head records; 4. in three-players-ties, percentage of sets won, then percentage of games won.

=== Consolation Playoffs ===
First round
D1	(Austria) Maximilian Heidlmair [4]	4	0
A4	(United Kingdom) Mark Ceban [8]	6	6
C4	(Australia) Jake Dembo [6]	w/o
B4	(United States) Keaton Hance [7]

Second round
A4	(United Kingdom) Mark Ceban [8]	6	6
C4	(Australia) Jake Dembo [6]	3	2

First round
D2	(United Kingdom) Liam Channon	4	7	[5]
A2	(Argentina) Dante Pagani	6	5	[10]
C2	(Jordan) Malek Alqurneh	1	3
B2	(Argentina) Benjamin Chelia	6	6

Second round
A2	(Argentina) Dante Pagani	6	6
B2	(Argentina) Benjamin Chelia	4	4

First round
D3	(Mexico) Mauricio Schtulmann	6^{6}	6	[10]
A3	(Morocco) Ali Missoum	7^{8}	4	[12]
C3	(Brazil) Pedro Dietrich	6	6
B3	(Northern Mariana Islands) La Hunn Lam	0	0

Second round
A3	(Morocco) Ali Missoum	6	7^{7}
C3	(Brazil) Pedro Dietrich	2	6^{0}
