= 2022 Wimbledon Championships – Wheelchair quad doubles =

Wheelchair quad doubles
- 2022 Wimbledon Championships

Final
- Champions: (Netherlands) Sam Schröder (Netherlands) Niels Vink
- Runners-up: (United Kingdom) Andy Lapthorne (United States) David Wagner
- Score: 6–7^{(4–7)}, 6–2, 6–3

Events
| Singles | men | women | | boys | girls |
| Doubles | men | women | mixed | boys | girls |
| WC Singles | men | women | quad |
| WC Doubles | men | women | quad |
| Legends | men | women | mixed |
| 14&U Singles | boys | girls |
| ← 2021 · | Wimbledon Championships | · 2023 → |

Sam Schröder and Niels Vink defeated the defending champions Andy Lapthorne and David Wagner in the final, 6–7^{(4–7)}, 6–2, 6–3 to win the quad doubles wheelchair tennis title at the 2022 Wimbledon Championships.

== Seeds ==
1. (Netherlands) Sam Schröder / (Netherlands) Niels Vink (champions)
2. (United Kingdom) Andy Lapthorne / (United States) David Wagner (final)

== Draw ==
=== Key ===
- Q = Qualifier
- WC = Wild card
- LL = Lucky loser
- Alt = Alternate
- SE = Special exempt
- PR = Protected ranking
- ITF = ITF entry
- JE = Junior exempt
- w/o = Walkover
- r = Retired
- d = Defaulted
- SR = Special ranking

=== Finals ===
Semifinals
1 | (Netherlands) Sam Schröder (Netherlands) Niels Vink | 6 | 6
(Australia) Heath Davidson (Brazil) Ymanitu Silva | 2 | 2
(South Africa) Donald Ramphadi (Japan) Koji Sugeno | 3 | 4^{r}
2 | (United Kingdom) Andy Lapthorne (United States) David Wagner | 6 | 3

Final
1 | (Netherlands) Sam Schröder (Netherlands) Niels Vink | 6^{4} | 6 | 6
2 | (United Kingdom) Andy Lapthorne (United States) David Wagner | 7^{7} | 2 | 3

== Sources ==
- Entry List
- Draw
