= 2022 Wimbledon Championships – Mixed invitation doubles =

Mixed invitation doubles
- 2022 Wimbledon Championships

Final
- Champions: (Serbia) Nenad Zimonjić (France) Marion Bartoli
- Runners-up: (Australia) Todd Woodbridge (Zimbabwe) Cara Black
- Score: 7–6^{(7–1)}, 6–1

Events
Singles	men	women		boys	girls
Doubles	men	women	mixed	boys	girls
WC Singles	men	women	quad
WC Doubles	men	women	quad
Legends	men	women	mixed
14&U Singles	boys	girls
Wimbledon Championships	· 2023 →

The 2022 Wimbledon championships, a Grand Slam tennis tournament, featured a mixed invitational doubles event for the first time.

Nenad Zimonjić and Marion Bartoli won the title, defeating Todd Woodbridge and Cara Black in the final, 7–6^{(7–1)}, 6–1.

== Format ==
Sixteen former professional tennis players, eight men and eight women competed, forming eight mixed pairs distributed in two round-robin groups. Following the round robin phase, the two group winners face each other in the final.

== Draw ==
=== Final ===
Final
A4	(Australia) Todd Woodbridge (Zimbabwe) Cara Black	6^{1}	1
B4	(Serbia) Nenad Zimonjić (France) Marion Bartoli	7^{7}	6

=== Group A ===
		(France) Bahrami (Spain) Martínez	(Sweden) Enqvist (Australia) Stubbs	(Sweden) Johansson (United States) Fernandez	(Australia) Woodbridge (Zimbabwe) Black	RR; W–L	Set; W–L	Game; W–L	Standings
A1	(France) Mansour Bahrami (Spain) Conchita Martínez		4–6, 6–4, [7–10]	6–4, 6–4	6–7^{(2–7)}, 1–6	1–2	3–4	29–32	3
A2	(Sweden) Thomas Enqvist (Australia) Rennae Stubbs	6–4, 4–6, [10–7]		6–4, 2–6, [16–14]	3–6, 4–6	2–1	4–4	27–32	2
A3	(Sweden) Thomas Johansson (United States) Mary Joe Fernandez	4–6, 4–6	4–6, 6–2, [14–16]		4–6, 3–6	0–3	1–6	25–33	4
A4	(Australia) Todd Woodbridge (Zimbabwe) Cara Black	7–6^{(7–2)}, 6–1	6–3, 6–4	6–4, 6–3		3–0	6–0	37-21	1

=== Group B ===
		(Croatia) Ivanišević (France) Pierce	(United Kingdom) Rusedski (United Kingdom) Keothavong	(Australia) Woodforde (Croatia) Majoli	(Serbia) Zimonjić (France) Bartoli	RR; W–L	Set; W–L	Game; W–L	Standings
B1	(Croatia) Goran Ivanišević (France) Mary Pierce		6–7^{(6–8)}, 6–3, [10–6]	3–6, 6–7^{(5–7)}	4–6, 4–6	1-2	2–5	30–35	3
B2	(United Kingdom) Greg Rusedski (United Kingdom) Anne Keothavong	7–6^{(8–6)}, 3–6, [6–10]		4–6, 6–7^{(7–9)}	3–6, 4–6	0–3	1–6	27–38	4
B3	(Australia) Mark Woodforde (Croatia) Iva Majoli	6–3, 7–6^{(7–5)}	6–4, 7–6^{(9–7)}		2–6, 7–6^{(9–7)}, [10–12]	2–1	5–2	35–32	2
B4	(Serbia) Nenad Zimonjić (France) Marion Bartoli	6–4, 6–4	6–3, 6–4	6–2, 6–7^{(7–9)}, [12–10]		3–0	6–1	37–24	1
