= 2022 Wimbledon Championships – Girls' 14&U singles =

Girls' 14&U singles
- 2022 Wimbledon Championships

Final
- Champion: (Romania) Alexia Ioana Tatu
- Runner-up: (Romania) Andreea Diana Soare
- Score: 7–6^{(7–2)}, 6–4

Events
Singles	men	women		boys	girls
Doubles	men	women	mixed	boys	girls
WC Singles	men	women	quad
WC Doubles	men	women	quad
14&U Singles	boys	girls
Legends	men	women	mixed
- Wimbledon Championships

This was the inaugural 14 and under girls event at Wimbledon. This event was created so young players from around the world could have an early experience of playing on Wimbledon's grass. In its debut year Alexia Ioana Tatu defeated Andreea Diana Soare, both of Romania, to claim the title.

== Format ==
The first phase of the tournament saw four round-robin groups compete. The winners of each group advanced to the semi-finals. The rest competed in a consolation play-off tournament.

== Draw ==
=== Final ===
Semifinals
A1	(Romania) Alexia Ioana Tatu	6	6
D3	(Argentina) Sol Ailin Larraya Guidi	0	3
C4	(Romania) Andreea Diana Soare	6	7
B3	(United Kingdom) Isabelle Britton	0	5

Final
A1	(Romania) Alexia Ioana Tatu	7^{7}	6
C4	(Romania) Andreea Diana Soare	6^{2}	4

=== Group A ===
		(Romania) Tatu	(Australia) Guillen	(Mexico) Ángel	(United Kingdom) Loftus	RR; W–L	Set; W–L	Game; W–L	Standings
A1	(Romania) Alexia Ioana Tatu		6–2, 6–4	3–6, 6–0, [10–2]	6–1, 6–0	3–0	6–1	34–13	1
A2	(Australia) Giselle Isabella Guillen	2–6, 4–6		6–1, 6–4	6–2, 6–0	2–1	4–2	30–19	2
A3	(Mexico) Marianne Ángel	6–3, 0–6, [2–10]	1–6, 4–6		2–6, 5–7	0–3	1–6	18–35	4
A4	(United Kingdom) Arabella Loftus	1–6, 0–6	2–6, 0–6	6–2, 7–5		1–2	2–4	16–31	3

=== Group B ===
		(Czech Republic) Sekerková	(Argentina) Vázquez	(United Kingdom) Britton	(Algeria) Badache	RR; W–L	Set; W–L	Game; W–L	Standings
B1	(Czech Republic) Veronika Sekerková		6–1 4–6, [6–10]	2–6, 7–6^{(7–5)}, [5–10]	6–4, 1–0, ret.	1–2	4–4	26–25	2
B2	(Argentina) Candela Vázquez	1–6, 6–4, [10–6]		3–6, 6–3, [7–10]	6–4, 6–7^{(4–7)}, [5–10]	1–2	4–5	29–32	3
B3	(United Kingdom) Isabelle Britton	6–2, 6–7^{(5–7)}, [10–5]	6–3, 3–6, [10–7]		6–2, 6–0	3–0	6–2	35–20	1
B4	(Algeria) Maria Badache	4–6, 0–1, ret.	4–6, 7–6^{(7–4)}, [10–5]	2–6, 0–6		1–2	2–5	18–31	4

=== Group C ===
		(United Kingdom) Stojsavljevic	(India) Jadhav	(New Zealand) Das	(Romania) Soare	RR; W–L	Set; W–L	Game; W–L	Standings
C1	(United Kingdom) Mika Stojsavljevic		6–4, 6–1	6–2, 7–6^{(7–3)}	6–1, 4–6, [3–10]	2–1	5–2	35–21	2
C2	(India) Aishwarya Jadhav	4–6, 1–6		3–6, 6–2, [5–10]	3–6, 2–6	0–3	1–6	19–33	4
C3	(New Zealand) Aishi Das	2–6, 6–7^{(3–7)}	6–3, 2–6, [10–5]		4–6, 4–6	1–2	2–5	25–34	3
C4	(Romania) Andreea Diana Soare	1–6, 6–4, [10–3]	6–3, 6–2	6–4, 6–4		3–0	6–1	32–23	1

=== Group D ===
		(United States) Okhtenberg	(Japan) Ichioka	(Argentina) Larraya Guidi	(France) Hetherington	RR; W–L	Set; W–L	Game; W–L	Standings
D1	(United States) Nicole Okhtenberg		2–6, 3–6	1–6, 5–7	6–0, 5–7, [10–6]	1–2	2–5	23–32	3
D2	(Japan) Azuna Ichioka	6–2, 6–3		4–6, 6–4, [8–10]	6–2, 6–2	2–1	5–2	34–20	2
D3	(Argentina) Sol Ailin Larraya Guidi	6–1, 7–5	6–4, 4–6, [10–8]		7–5, 6–3	3–0	6–1	37–24	1
D4	(France) Scarlette Hetherington	0–6, 7–5, [6–10]	2–6, 2–6	5–7, 3–6		0–3	1–6	19–37	4

Standings are determined by: 1. number of wins; 2. number of matches played; 3. in two-players-ties, head-to-head records; 4. in three-players-ties, percentage of sets won, then percentage of games won.

=== Consolation Playoffs ===
First round
C1	(United Kingdom) Mika Stojsavljevic	6	2	[10]
B1	(Czech Republic) Veronika Sekerková	0	6	[7]
D2	(Japan) Azuna Ichioka	4	3
A2	(Australia) Giselle Isabella Guillen	6	6

Second round
C1	(United Kingdom) Mika Stojsavljevic	6	6
A2	(Australia) Giselle Isabella Guillen	2	3

First round
C3	(New Zealand) Aishi Das	w/o
B2	(Argentina) Candela Vázquez
D1	(United States) Nicole Okhtenberg	6	6
A4	(United Kingdom) Arabella Loftus	2	2

Second round
C3	(New Zealand) Aishi Das	6	4	[8]
D1	(United States) Nicole Okhtenberg	1	6	[10]

First round
C2	(India) Aishwarya Jadhav	w/o
B4	(Algeria) Maria Badache
D4	(France) Scarlette Hetherington	4	6	[10]
A3	(Mexico) Marianne Ángel	6	1	[5]

Second round
C2	(India) Aishwarya Jadhav	4	1
D4	(France) Scarlette Hetherington	6	6
