= 2022 Wimbledon Championships – Wheelchair quad singles =

Tennis championship

Wheelchair quad singles
- 2022 Wimbledon Championships

Final
- Champion: (Netherlands) Sam Schröder
- Runner-up: (Netherlands) Niels Vink
- Score: 7–6^{(7–5)}, 6–1

Details
- Draw: 8
- Seeds: 2

Events
Singles	men	women		boys	girls
Doubles	men	women	mixed	boys	girls
WC Singles	men	women	quad
WC Doubles	men	women	quad
Legends	men	women	mixed
14&U Singles	boys	girls
- Wimbledon Championships

Sam Schröder defeated Niels Vink in the final, 7–6^{(7–5)}, 6–1 to win the quad singles wheelchair tennis title at the 2022 Wimbledon Championships.

Dylan Alcott was the two-time reigning champion, but retired from professional tennis in January 2022.

This was the first edition of the Wimbledon Wheelchair Quad Singles to have eight players.

== Seeds ==
1. (Netherlands) Niels Vink (final)
2. (Netherlands) Sam Schröder (champion)

== Draw ==
Key

- Q = Qualifier
- WC = Wild card
- LL = Lucky loser
- Alt = Alternate
- ITF = ITF entry
- PR = Protected ranking
- SR = Special ranking
- SE = Special exempt
- JE = Junior exempt
- JR = Junior Accelerator Programme entrant
- CO = College Accelerator Programme entrant
- NG = Next Gen Accelerator Program entrant
- w/o = Walkover
- r = Retired
- d = Defaulted

=== Finals ===
Quarterfinals
1	(Netherlands) Niels Vink	6	6
WC	(Brazil) Ymanitu Silva	1	1
(United Kingdom) Andy Lapthorne	1	3
(Australia) Heath Davidson	6	6
(South Africa) Donald Ramphadi	1	3
(United States) David Wagner	6	6
(Japan) Koji Sugeno	4	6	0
2	(Netherlands) Sam Schröder	6	0	6

Semifinals
1	(Netherlands) Niels Vink	7^{9}	6
(Australia) Heath Davidson	6^{7}	1
(United States) David Wagner	0	7^{7}	1
2	(Netherlands) Sam Schröder	6	6^{5}	6

Final
1	(Netherlands) Niels Vink	6^{5}	1
2	(Netherlands) Sam Schröder	7^{7}	6

== Sources ==
- Entry List
- Draw
- ITF Tournament Details
