= 2022 Wimbledon Championships – Ladies' invitation doubles =

Ladies' invitation doubles
- 2022 Wimbledon Championships

Final
- Champions: (Belgium) Kim Clijsters (Switzerland) Martina Hingis
- Runners-up: (Slovakia) Daniela Hantuchová (United Kingdom) Laura Robson
- Score: 6–4, 6–2

Events
Singles	men	women		boys	girls
Doubles	men	women	mixed	boys	girls
WC Singles	men	women	quad
WC Doubles	men	women	quad
Legends	men	women	mixed
14&U Singles	boys	girls
← 2019 ·	Wimbledon Championships	· 2023 →

Cara Black and Martina Navratilova were the defending champions from the last edition held in 2019, but neither chose to compete this year.

Kim Clijsters and Martina Hingis won the title, defeating Daniela Hantuchová and Laura Robson in the final, 6–4, 6–2.

== Draw ==
=== Key ===
- Q = Qualifier
- WC = Wild card
- LL = Lucky loser
- Alt = Alternate
- ITF = ITF entry
- PR = Protected ranking
- SR = Special ranking
- SE = Special exempt
- JE = Junior exempt
- JR = Junior Accelerator Programme entrant
- CO = College Accelerator Programme entrant
- NG = Next Gen Accelerator Program entrant
- w/o = Walkover
- r = Retired
- d = Defaulted

=== Final ===
Final
A1	(Belgium) Kim Clijsters (Switzerland) Martina Hingis	6	6
B2	(Slovakia) Daniela Hantuchová (United Kingdom) Laura Robson	4	2

=== Group A ===
		(Belgium) Clijsters (Switzerland) Hingis	(France) Dechy (Austria) Schett	(Germany) Grönefeld (Croatia) Šprem	(United States) King (Kazakhstan) Shvedova	RR; W–L	Set; W–L	Game; W–L	Standings
A1	(Belgium) Kim Clijsters (Switzerland) Martina Hingis		6–0, 6–3	6–1, 6–3	6–4, 6–1	3–0	6–0	36–12	1
A2	(France) Nathalie Dechy (Austria) Barbara Schett	0–6, 3–6		4–6, 3–6	2–6, 4–6	0–3	0–6	16–36	4
A3	(Germany) Anna-Lena Grönefeld (Croatia) Karolina Šprem	1–6, 3–6	6–4, 6–3		6–3, 6–7^{(4–7)}, [7–10]	1–2	3–4	28–30	3
A4	(United States) Vania King (Kazakhstan) Yaroslava Shvedova	4–6, 1–6	6–2, 6–4	3–6, 7–6^{(7–4)}, [10–7]		2–1	4–3	28–30	2

=== Group B ===
		(Australia) Dellacqua (Australia) Molik	(Slovakia) Hantuchová (United Kingdom) Robson	(Serbia) Janković (Poland) Radwańska	(Italy) Pennetta (Italy) Schiavone	RR; W–L	Set; W–L	Game; W–L	Standings
B1	(Australia) Casey Dellacqua (Australia) Alicia Molik		3–6, 5–7	2–6, 2–6	7–6^{(7–3)}, 3–6, [5–10]	0–3	1–6	22–38	4
B2	(Slovakia) Daniela Hantuchová (United Kingdom) Laura Robson	6–3, 7–5		6–4, 6–2	5–7, 5–7	2–1	4–2	35–28	1
B3	(Serbia) Jelena Janković (Poland) Agnieszka Radwańska	6–2, 6–2	4–6, 2–6		6–4, 6–3	2–1	4–2	30–23	2
B4	(Italy) Flavia Pennetta (Italy) Francesca Schiavone	6–7^{(3–7)}, 6–3, [10–5]	7–5, 7–5	4–6, 3–6		2–1	4–3	34–32	3
