= 2022 Wimbledon Championships – Wheelchair men's singles =

Tennis championship

Wheelchair men's singles
- 2022 Wimbledon Championships

Final
- Champion: (Japan) Shingo Kunieda
- Runner-up: (United Kingdom) Alfie Hewett
- Score: 4–6, 7–5, 7–6^{(10–5)}

Details
- Draw: 8
- Seeds: 2

Events
Singles	men	women		boys	girls
Doubles	men	women	mixed	boys	girls
WC Singles	men	women	quad
WC Doubles	men	women	quad
Legends	men	women	mixed
14&U Singles	boys	girls
← 2021 ·	Wimbledon Championships	· 2023 →

Shingo Kunieda defeated Alfie Hewett in the final, 4–6, 7–5, 7–6^{(10–5)} to win the gentlemen's singles wheelchair tennis title at the 2022 Wimbledon Championships. It was his first Wimbledon singles title and record-extending 28th major singles title overall. With the win, Kunieda completed both a non-calendar year Grand Slam and the career Super Slam. Hewett served for the championship four times, but Kunieda broke his serve on all four occasions.

Joachim Gérard was the defending champion, but was defeated by Kunieda in the semifinals.

== Seeds ==
1. (Japan) Shingo Kunieda (champion)
2. (United Kingdom) Alfie Hewett (final)

== Draw ==
=== Key ===
- Q = Qualifier
- WC = Wild card
- LL = Lucky loser
- Alt = Alternate
- ITF = ITF entry
- PR = Protected ranking
- SR = Special ranking
- SE = Special exempt
- JE = Junior exempt
- JR = Junior Accelerator Programme entrant
- CO = College Accelerator Programme entrant
- NG = Next Gen Accelerator Program entrant
- w/o = Walkover
- r = Retired
- d = Defaulted

=== Finals ===
Quarterfinals
1	(Japan) Shingo Kunieda	6	6^{5}	6
(Netherlands) Tom Egberink	1	7^{7}	1
(Belgium) Joachim Gérard	6	7^{7}
WC	(Japan) Tokito Oda	4	6^{2}
(Argentina) Gustavo Fernández	6	6
(France) Nicolas Peifer	4	1
(United Kingdom) Gordon Reid	2	6	4
2	(United Kingdom) Alfie Hewett	6	3	6

Semifinals
1	(Japan) Shingo Kunieda	6	6
(Belgium) Joachim Gérard	2	1
(Argentina) Gustavo Fernández	6	6^{3}	4
2	(United Kingdom) Alfie Hewett	2	7^{7}	6

Final
1	(Japan) Shingo Kunieda	4	7	7^{10}
2	(United Kingdom) Alfie Hewett	6	5	6^{5}

== Sources ==
- Entry List
- Draw
- ITF Tournament Details
