= 2022 Wimbledon Championships – Boys' singles =

Boys' singles
- 2022 Wimbledon Championships

Final
- Champion: (Croatia) Mili Poljičak
- Runner-up: (United States) Michael Zheng
- Score: 7–6^{(7–2)}, 7–6^{(7–3)}

Events
Singles	men	women		boys	girls
Doubles	men	women	mixed	boys	girls
WC Singles	men	women	quad
WC Doubles	men	women	quad
14&U Singles	boys	girls
Legends	men	women	mixed
- Wimbledon Championships

Mili Poljičak won the title, defeating Michael Zheng in the final, 7–6^{(7–2)}, 7–6^{(7–3)}.

Samir Banerjee was the defending champion, but was no longer eligible to participate in junior events.

== Seeds ==
1. (France) Gabriel Debru (second round)
2. (Czech Republic) Jakub Menšík (second round)
3. (Croatia) Mili Poljičak (champion)
4. (Peru) Gonzalo Bueno (second round)
5. (United States) Nishesh Basavareddy (second round)
6. (Switzerland) Kilian Feldbausch (quarterfinals)
7. (Belgium) Gilles-Arnaud Bailly (third round)
8. (Lithuania) Edas Butvilas (third round)

9. (Croatia) Dino Prižmić (second round)
10. (Spain) Martín Landaluce (semifinals)
11. (Mexico) Rodrigo Pacheco Méndez (second round)
12. (Peru) Ignacio Buse (second round)
13. (Argentina) Lautaro Midón (first round)
14. (Slovenia) Bor Artnak (third round)
15. (Poland) Martyn Pawelski (third round)
16. (Czech Republic) Jakub Nicod (first round)

Click on the seed number of a player to go to their draw section.

== Draw ==
Key

- Q = Qualifier
- WC = Wild card
- LL = Lucky loser
- Alt = Alternate
- ITF = ITF entry
- PR = Protected ranking
- SR = Special ranking
- SE = Special exempt
- JE = Junior exempt
- JR = Junior Accelerator Programme entrant
- CO = College Accelerator Programme entrant
- NG = Next Gen Accelerator Program entrant
- w/o = Walkover
- r = Retired
- d = Defaulted

=== Finals ===
Quarterfinals
(United States) Michael Zheng	6	6
(Hong Kong) Coleman Wong	4	3
(United States) Learner Tien	5	3
10	(Spain) Martín Landaluce	7	6
6	(Switzerland) Kilian Feldbausch	6	3	2
3	(Croatia) Mili Poljičak	1	6	6
(North Macedonia) Kalin Ivanovski	6	6^{5}	4
(Spain) Pedro Ródenas	3	7^{7}	6

Semifinals
(United States) Michael Zheng	6	3	7^{10}
10	(Spain) Martín Landaluce	3	6	6^{7}
3	(Croatia) Mili Poljičak	7	6
(Spain) Pedro Ródenas	5	2

Final
(United States) Michael Zheng	6^{2}	6^{3}
3	(Croatia) Mili Poljičak	7^{7}	7^{7}

=== Top half ===
==== Section 1 ====
First round
1	(France) Gabriel Debru	6	6
WC	(United Kingdom) Louis Bowden	0	1
Q	(Japan) Hayato Matsuoka	4	3
Q	(United States) Aidan Kim	6	6
(United States) Michael Zheng	6	6
Q	(Australia) Hayden Jones	3	4
(Paraguay) Martín Antonio Vergara del Puerto	6	6
16	(Czech Republic) Jakub Nicod	3	4
9	(Croatia) Dino Prižmić	6	6
(Thailand) Tanapatt Nirundorn	1	2
Q	(United States) Jonah Braswell	6^{4}	2
(Hong Kong) Coleman Wong	7^{7}	6
WC	(United Kingdom) Benjamin Gusic Wan	5	1
(Slovakia) Peter Benjamín Privara	7	6
(Switzerland) Dylan Dietrich	2	6	4
5	(United States) Nishesh Basavareddy	6	4	6

Second round
1	(France) G Debru	6	3	3
Q	(United States) A Kim	4	6	6
(United States) M Zheng	7	6
(Paraguay) MA Vergara del Puerto	5	0
9	(Croatia) D Prižmić	5	2
(Hong Kong) C Wong	7	6
(Slovakia) PB Privara	4	6	6
5	(United States) N Basavareddy	6	3	4

Third round
Q	(United States) A Kim	4	6	4
(United States) M Zheng	6	3	6
(Hong Kong) C Wong	7	7
(Slovakia) PB Privara	5	5

Quarterfinals
(United States) M Zheng	6	6
(Hong Kong) C Wong	4	3

==== Section 2 ====
First round
4	(Peru) Gonzalo Bueno	6	6
(Argentina) Juan Manuel La Serna	4	2
Q	(New Zealand) Jack Loutit	4	0
(United States) Learner Tien	6	6
(France) Paul Barbier Gazeu	7^{7}	6^{0}	6
(Namibia) Connor Henry van Schalkwyk	6^{4}	7^{7}	3
WC	(United Kingdom) Patrick Brady	3	0
15	(Poland) Martyn Pawelski	6	6
10	(Spain) Martín Landaluce	6	6
(South Korea) Gerard Campaña Lee	2	3
Q	(Australia) Edward Winter	7^{7}	4	6
(United States) Alex Michelsen	6^{4}	6	1
(Bolivia) Juan Carlos Prado Ángelo	5	6^{2}
WC	(United Kingdom) William Jansen	7	7^{7}
(United States) Nicholas Godsick	2	0
7	(Belgium) Gilles-Arnaud Bailly	6	6

Second round
4	(Peru) G Bueno	6	3	3
(United States) L Tien	4	6	6
(France) P Barbier Gazeu	7^{7}	2	4
15	(Poland) M Pawelski	6^{5}	6	6
10	(Spain) M Landaluce	6	7^{10}
Q	(Australia) E Winter	2	6^{8}
WC	(United Kingdom) W Jansen	4	3
7	(Belgium) G-A Bailly	6	6

Third round
(United States) L Tien	6	6^{5}	6
15	(Poland) M Pawelski	3	7^{7}	2
10	(Spain) M Landaluce	7^{9}	6
7	(Belgium) G-A Bailly	6^{7}	4

Quarterfinals
(United States) L Tien	5	3
10	(Spain) M Landaluce	7	6

=== Bottom half ===
==== Section 3 ====
First round
6	(Switzerland) Kilian Feldbausch	6	6
Q	(United States) Leanid Boika	1	4
(Czech Republic) Hynek Bartoň	6	7^{7}
(France) Arthur Géa	2	6^{5}
WC	(United Kingdom) Phoenix Weir	3	3
(Belgium) Alexander Blockx	6	6
(United States) Cooper Williams	2	4
12	(Peru) Ignacio Buse	6	6
13	(Argentina) Lautaro Midón	6^{6}	4
(Brazil) João Fonseca	7^{8}	6
(United States) Sebastian Gorzny	6	6
WC	(United Kingdom) Viktor Frydrych	3	4
(Slovakia) Peter Naď	4	3
(Canada) Jaden Weekes	6	6
(Australia) Jeremy Jin	4	3
3	(Croatia) Mili Poljičak	6	6

Second round
6	(Switzerland) K Feldbausch	6^{11}	7	6
(Czech Republic) H Bartoň	7^{13}	5	2
(Belgium) A Blockx	6	6
12	(Peru) I Buse	3	4
(Brazil) J Fonseca	6	3	4
(United States) S Gorzny	2	6	6
(Canada) J Weekes	5	6^{4}
3	(Croatia) M Poljičak	7	7^{7}

Third round
6	(Switzerland) K Feldbausch	6^{5}	6	6
(Belgium) A Blockx	7^{7}	2	0
(United States) S Gorzny	2	5
3	(Croatia) M Poljičak	6	7

Quarterfinals
6	(Switzerland) K Feldbausch	6	3	2
3	(Croatia) M Poljičak	1	6	6

==== Section 4 ====
First round
8	(Lithuania) Edas Butvilas	6	6
(Switzerland) Mika Brunold	2	2
(Poland) Olaf Pieczkowski	5	1
(United States) Ozan Colak	7	6
(North Macedonia) Kalin Ivanovski	3	6	6
WC	(United Kingdom) Luca Pow	6	4	2
(Belgium) Alessio Basile	4	1
11	(Mexico) Rodrigo Pacheco Méndez	6	6
14	(Slovenia) Bor Artnak	7^{7}	6
(France) Paul Inchauspé	6^{4}	1
(United States) Alexander Frusina	6	4	6
Q	(Japan) Lennon Roark Jones	3	6	4
(Spain) Pedro Ródenas	6	6
(Croatia) Matej Dodig	4	4
WC	(United Kingdom) Henry Searle	4	6^{4}
2	(Czech Republic) Jakub Menšík	6	7^{7}

Second round
8	(Lithuania) E Butvilas	6	6
(United States) O Colak	3	3
(North Macedonia) K Ivanovski	6	6
11	(Mexico) R Pacheco Méndez	1	2
14	(Slovenia) B Artnak	6	3	7
(United States) A Frusina	2	6	5
(Spain) P Ródenas	6	6
2	(Czech Republic) J Menšík	3	4

Third round
8	(Lithuania) E Butvilas	4	7	0
(North Macedonia) K Ivanovski	6	5	6
14	(Slovenia) B Artnak	1	2
(Spain) P Ródenas	6	6

Quarterfinals
(North Macedonia) K Ivanovski	6	6^{5}	4
(Spain) P Ródenas	3	7^{7}	6

== Qualifying ==
=== Seeds ===
1. (Japan) Hayato Matsuoka (qualified)
2. (Romania) Mihai Alexandru Coman (qualifying competition)
3. (Serbia) Nikola Zekić (first round)
4. (United States) Aidan Kim (qualified)
5. (Poland) Borys Zgoła (qualifying competition)
6. (United States) Leanid Boika (qualified)
7. (Cyprus) Constantinos Koshis (withdrew)
8. (Italy) Lorenzo Ferri (qualifying competition)
9. (United States) Jonah Braswell (qualified)
10. (Japan) Lennon Roark Jones (qualified)
11. (Mexico) Luis Carlos Álvarez Valdés (first round)
12. (Turkey) Togan Tokaç (qualifying competition)
13. (United States) Yannik Rahman (qualifying competition)
14. (Japan) Kenta Miyoshi (first round)
15. (New Zealand) Jack Loutit (qualified)
16. (Chile) Alejandro Bancalari (first round)

=== Qualifiers ===
1. (Japan) Hayato Matsuoka
2. (New Zealand) Jack Loutit
3. (Australia) Hayden Jones
4. (United States) Aidan Kim
5. (Australia) Edward Winter
6. (United States) Leanid Boika
7. (United States) Jonah Braswell
8. (Japan) Lennon Roark Jones

=== Draw ===
==== First qualifier ====
First round
1	(Japan) Hayato Matsuoka	7	6
WC	(United Kingdom) Matthew Rankin	5	4
(Italy) Gianmarco Gandolfi	7^{7}	6
16	(Chile) Alejandro Bancalari	6^{3}	4

Qualifying competition
1	(Japan) Hayato Matsuoka	6	6
(Italy) Gianmarco Gandolfi	2	1

==== Second qualifier ====
First round
2	(Romania) Mihai Alexandru Coman	4	7^{10}	[11]
(Sweden) Sebastian Eriksson	6	6^{8}	[9]
(Croatia) Ivan Šodan	3	2
15	(New Zealand) Jack Loutit	6	6

Qualifying competition
2	(Romania) Mihai Alexandru Coman	3	3
15	(New Zealand) Jack Loutit	6	6

==== Third qualifier ====
First round
3	(Serbia) Nikola Zekić	6	4	[7]
(Australia) Hayden Jones	2	6	[10]
WC	(United Kingdom) Henry Jefferson	6	3	[3]
13	(United States) Yannik Rahman	3	6	[10]

Qualifying competition
(Australia) Hayden Jones	6	6
13	(United States) Yannik Rahman	4	4

==== Fourth qualifier ====
First round
4	(United States) Aidan Kim	7	6
WC	(United Kingdom) Zach Stephens	5	3
(South Africa) Devin Badenhorst	6	6
14	(Japan) Kenta Miyoshi	2	4

Qualifying competition
4	(United States) Aidan Kim	7^{7}	3	[11]
(South Africa) Devin Badenhorst	6^{3}	6	[9]

==== Fifth qualifier ====
First round
5	(Poland) Borys Zgoła	6	7^{7}
(Italy) Niccolò Ciavarella	3	6^{4}
(Australia) Edward Winter	6	6
11	(Mexico) Luis Carlos Álvarez Valdés	3	0

Qualifying competition
5	(Poland) Borys Zgoła	3	2
(Australia) Edward Winter	6	6

==== Sixth qualifier ====
First round
6	(United States) Leanid Boika	6	7^{7}
(Italy) Daniele Minighini	3	6^{3}
WC	(United Kingdom) Oliver Bonding	4	2
12	(Turkey) Togan Tokaç	6	6

Qualifying competition
6	(United States) Leanid Boika	6	6
12	(Turkey) Togan Tokaç	2	4

==== Seventh qualifier ====
First round
Alt	(United States) Jelani Sarr	7^{7}	6
WC	(United Kingdom) Hugo Coquelin	6^{3}	2
(Italy) Federico Bondioli	5	6	[5]
9	(United States) Jonah Braswell	7	2	[10]

Qualifying competition
Alt	(United States) Jelani Sarr	6^{6}	6	[7]
9	(United States) Jonah Braswell	7^{8}	4	[10]

==== Eighth qualifier ====
First round
8	(Italy) Lorenzo Ferri	6	7
(Israel) Ron Ellouck	3	5
WC	(United Kingdom) Freddie Ridout	3	1
10	(Japan) Lennon Roark Jones	6	6

Qualifying competition
8	(Italy) Lorenzo Ferri	4	6	[6]
10	(Japan) Lennon Roark Jones	6	4	[10]
