= 2022 Wimbledon Championships – Gentlemen's invitation doubles =

Gentlemen's invitation doubles
- 2022 Wimbledon Championships

Final
- Champions: (United States) Bob Bryan (United States) Mike Bryan
- Runners-up: (Belgium) Xavier Malisse (Cyprus) Marcos Baghdatis
- Score: 6–3, 6–4

Events
Singles	men	women		boys	girls
Doubles	men	women	mixed	boys	girls
WC Singles	men	women	quad
WC Doubles	men	women	quad
Legends	men	women	mixed
14&U Singles	boys	girls
← 2019 ·	Wimbledon Championships	· 2023 →

The 2022 Wimbledon championships of tennis featured the 31st edition of the gentlemen's invitational doubles event, an exhibition event pitting former professional tennis players against one another.

Frenchmen Arnaud Clément and Michaël Llodra were the defending champions, but were eliminated in the round robin competition.

Bob and Mike Bryan won the title, defeating Xavier Malisse and Marcos Baghdatis in the final, 6–3, 6–4.

== Format ==
Sixteen former professional tennis players competed in a round-robin stage in pairs of two distributed over two groups. The winners of each group faced each other in the final.

== Draw ==
=== Key ===
- Q = Qualifier
- WC = Wild card
- LL = Lucky loser
- Alt = Alternate
- ITF = ITF entry
- PR = Protected ranking
- SR = Special ranking
- SE = Special exempt
- JE = Junior exempt
- JR = Junior Accelerator Programme entrant
- CO = College Accelerator Programme entrant
- NG = Next Gen Accelerator Program entrant
- w/o = Walkover
- r = Retired
- d = Defaulted

=== Final ===
Final
A1	(Belgium) Xavier Malisse (Cyprus) Marcos Baghdatis	3	4
B1	(United States) Bob Bryan (United States) Mike Bryan	6	6

=== Group A ===
		(Belgium) Malisse (Cyprus) Baghdatis	(United States) Blake (Canada) Nestor	(France) Clément (France) Llodra	(Germany) Haas (Australia) Philippoussis	RR; W–L	Set; W–L	Game; W–L	Standings
A1	(Belgium) Xavier Malisse (Cyprus) Marcos Baghdatis		6–2, 7–6^{(11–9)}	2–6, 7–6^{(7–3)}, [10–7]	2–6, 6–4, [10–6]	3–0	6–2	32–30	1
A2	(United States) James Blake (Canada) Daniel Nestor	2–6, 6–7^{(9–11)}		3–6, 4–6	1–6, 6–7^{(5–7)}	0–3	0–6	22–38	4
A3	(France) Arnaud Clément (France) Michaël Llodra	6–2, 6–7^{(3–7)}, [7–10]	6–3, 6–4		4–6, 5–7	1–2	3–4	33–30	3
A4	(Germany) Tommy Haas (Australia) Mark Philippoussis	6–2, 4–6, [6–10]	6–1, 7–6^{(7–5)}	6–4, 7–5		2–1	5–2	36–25	2

=== Group B ===
		(United States) Bryan (United States) Bryan	(Chile) González (France) Grosjean	(United Kingdom) Marray (Denmark) Nielsen	(Austria) Melzer (Luxembourg) Müller	RR; W–L	Set; W–L	Game; W–L	Standings
B1	(United States) Bob Bryan (United States) Mike Bryan		6–4, 6–4	6–4, 6–4	7–6^{(7–5)}, 6–2	3–0	6–0	37–24	1
B2	(Chile) Fernando González (France) Sebastien Grosjean	4–6, 4–6		6–3, 7–5	7–5, 2–6, [4–10]	1–2	3–4	30–32	3
B3	(United Kingdom) Jonathan Marray (Denmark) Frederik Nielsen	4–6, 4–6	3–6, 5–7		6–7^{(3–7)}, 4–6	0–3	0–6	26–38	4
B4	(Austria) Jürgen Melzer (Luxembourg) Gilles Müller	6-7^{(7–5)}, 2-6	5–7, 6–2, [10–4]	7–6^{(7–3)}, 6–4		2–1	4–3	33–32	2
