= 2022 Wimbledon Championships – Mixed doubles =

Mixed doubles
- 2022 Wimbledon Championships

Final
- Champions: (United Kingdom) Neal Skupski (United States) Desirae Krawczyk
- Runners-up: (Australia) Matthew Ebden (Australia) Samantha Stosur
- Score: 6–4, 6–3

Details
- Draw: 32
- Seeds: 8

Events
| Singles | men | women | | boys | girls |
| Doubles | men | women | mixed | boys | girls |
| WC Singles | men | women | quad |
| WC Doubles | men | women | quad |
| 14&U Singles | boys | girls |
| Legends | men | women | mixed |
- Wimbledon Championships

Defending champions Neal Skupski and Desirae Krawczyk defeated Matthew Ebden and Samantha Stosur in the final, 6–4, 6–3 to win the mixed doubles tennis title at the 2022 Wimbledon Championships. It was Skupski's second major title, and Krawczyk's fourth. They were the first team to win consecutive mixed doubles titles at Wimbledon since Cyril Suk and Helena Suková in 1997.

This was the first edition of the tournament to feature a champions (Note: also referred to as super tie-break) tie-break (10-point tie-break), when the score reaches six games all in the third set, and the third edition to feature a final set tie-break. (Note: The previous tie-break rule was a 7-point tie-break, when the score reached twelve games all in the fifth set.) Mate Pavić, Sania Mirza, David Vega Hernández and Natela Dzalamidze were the first players to contest this tiebreak in the mixed doubles event, with the team of Pavić and Mirza winning the tiebreak 10–3 in their first-round match.

This was also the first edition of the mixed doubles event to feature 32 instead of 48 teams, and thus five instead of six rounds, with the final moved earlier from the last Sunday of competition to the last Thursday.

Mirza was attempting to complete the career Grand Slam, but was defeated in the semifinals by Skupski and Krawczyk.

== Seeds ==
1. (Netherlands) Jean-Julien Rojer / (Japan) Ena Shibahara (second round)
2. (United Kingdom) Neal Skupski / (United States) Desirae Krawczyk (champions)
3. (France) Nicolas Mahut / (China) Zhang Shuai (second round)
4. (Australia) John Peers / (Canada) Gabriela Dabrowski (quarterfinals)
5. (El Salvador) Marcelo Arévalo / (Mexico) Giuliana Olmos (first round)
6. (Croatia) Mate Pavić / (India) Sania Mirza (semifinals)
7. (Colombia) Robert Farah / (Latvia) Jeļena Ostapenko (quarterfinals)
8. (Slovakia) Filip Polášek / (Slovenia) Andreja Klepač (second round)

== Draw ==
Key

- Q = Qualifier
- WC = Wild card
- LL = Lucky loser
- Alt = Alternate
- ITF = ITF entry
- PR = Protected ranking
- SR = Special ranking
- SE = Special exempt
- JE = Junior exempt
- JR = Junior Accelerator Programme entrant
- CO = College Accelerator Programme entrant
- NG = Next Gen Accelerator Program entrant
- w/o = Walkover
- r = Retired
- d = Defaulted

=== Finals ===
Semifinals
(Australia) Matthew Ebden (Australia) Samantha Stosur | 6 | 5 | 7
(United States) Jack Sock (United States) Coco Gauff | 3 | 7 | 5
6 | (Croatia) Mate Pavić (India) Sania Mirza | 6 | 5 | 4
2 | (United Kingdom) Neal Skupski (United States) Desirae Krawczyk | 4 | 7 | 6

Final
(Australia) Matthew Ebden (Australia) Samantha Stosur | 4 | 3
2 | (United Kingdom) Neal Skupski (United States) Desirae Krawczyk | 6 | 6

=== Top half ===
First round
1 | (Netherlands) J-J Rojer (Japan) E Shibahara | 6 | 7^{12}
(United States) A Krajicek (Chile) A Guarachi | 4 | 6^{10}
(Australia) M Ebden (Australia) S Stosur | 4 | 7^{8} | 6
Alt | (Belgium) J Vliegen (Norway) U Eikeri | 6 | 6^{6} | 4
(New Zealand) M Venus (Poland) A Rosolska | 3 | 7^{7} | 3
WC | (United Kingdom) J Murray (United States) V Williams | 6 | 6^{3} | 6
WC | (United Kingdom) J O'Mara (United Kingdom) A Barnett | 6 | 3 | 7
5 | (El Salvador) M Arévalo (Mexico) G Olmos | 2 | 6 | 5
3 | (France) N Mahut (China) S Zhang | 6 | 6
(Ecuador) G Escobar (Czech Republic) L Hradecká | 3 | 4
(United States) J Sock (United States) C Gauff | 6 | 6
WC | (United Kingdom) K Edmund (United Kingdom) O Nicholls | 4 | 1
(Argentina) M González (United States) K Christian | 7^{8} | 6^{8} | 4
PR | (France) É Roger-Vasselin (France) A Cornet | 6^{6} | 7^{10} | 6
(Australia) M Purcell (Australia) S Sanders | 6^{2} | 6 | 3
8 | (Slovakia) F Polášek (Slovenia) A Klepač | 7^{7} | 4 | 6

Second round
1 | (Netherlands) J-J Rojer (Japan) E Shibahara | 3 | 7^{7} | 4
(Australia) M Ebden (Australia) S Stosur | 6 | 6^{5} | 6
WC | (United Kingdom) J Murray (United States) V Williams | 6 | 4 | 6^{16}
WC | (United Kingdom) J O'Mara (United Kingdom) A Barnett | 3 | 6 | 7^{18}
3 | (France) N Mahut (China) S Zhang | 4 | 6^{3}
(United States) J Sock (United States) C Gauff | 6 | 7^{7}
PR | (France) É Roger-Vasselin (France) A Cornet | 7 | 6
8 | (Slovakia) F Polášek (Slovenia) A Klepač | 5 | 2

Quarterfinals
(Australia) M Ebden (Australia) S Stosur | 6 | 6
WC | (United Kingdom) J O'Mara (United Kingdom) A Barnett | 3 | 1
(United States) J Sock (United States) C Gauff | 6 | 6
PR | (France) É Roger-Vasselin (France) A Cornet | 3 | 4

Semifinals
(Australia) M Ebden (Australia) S Stosur | 6 | 5 | 7
(United States) J Sock (United States) C Gauff | 3 | 7 | 5

=== Bottom half ===
First round
6 | (Croatia) M Pavić (India) S Mirza | 6 | 3 | 7^{10}
(Spain) D Vega Hernández (Georgia (country)) N Dzalamidze | 4 | 6 | 6^{3}
WC | (Croatia) I Dodig (Chinese Taipei) L Chan | 6 | 5 | 6
(Germany) A Mies (New Zealand) E Routliffe | 2 | 7 | 4
(Brazil) R Matos (Ukraine) L Kichenok | 6^{6} | 3
(Brazil) B Soares (Brazil) B Haddad Maia | 7^{8} | 6
(Uruguay) A Behar (Netherlands) D Schuurs | 3 | 4
4 | (Australia) J Peers (Canada) G Dabrowski | 6 | 6
7 | (Colombia) R Farah (Latvia) J Ostapenko | 7 | 3 | 6
(Japan) B McLachlan (Chinese Taipei) H-c Chan | 5 | 6 | 1
Alt | (Serbia) N Ćaćić (Serbia) A Krunić | 3 | 6 | 6
(Germany) K Krawietz (United States) N Melichar-Martinez | 6 | 3 | 3
(Netherlands) M Middelkoop (Australia) E Perez | 6 | 7
(Mexico) S González (China) Z Yang | 2 | 5
(Australia) T Kokkinakis (United States) A Muhammad | 5 | 7^{7} | 4
2 | (United Kingdom) N Skupski (United States) D Krawczyk | 7 | 6^{4} | 6

Second round
6 | (Croatia) M Pavić (India) S Mirza | w/o
WC | (Croatia) I Dodig (Chinese Taipei) L Chan
(Brazil) B Soares (Brazil) B Haddad Maia | 6 | 3 | 0
4 | (Australia) J Peers (Canada) G Dabrowski | 4 | 6 | 6
7 | (Colombia) R Farah (Latvia) J Ostapenko | 7^{7} | 6
Alt | (Serbia) N Ćaćić (Serbia) A Krunić | 6^{5} | 4
(Netherlands) M Middelkoop (Australia) E Perez | 5 | 2
2 | (United Kingdom) N Skupski (United States) D Krawczyk | 7 | 6

Quarterfinals
6 | (Croatia) M Pavić (India) S Mirza | 6 | 3 | 7
4 | (Australia) J Peers (Canada) G Dabrowski | 4 | 6 | 5
7 | (Colombia) R Farah (Latvia) J Ostapenko | 6^{6} | 1
2 | (United Kingdom) N Skupski (United States) D Krawczyk | 7^{8} | 6

Semifinals
6 | (Croatia) M Pavić (India) S Mirza | 6 | 5 | 4
2 | (United Kingdom) N Skupski (United States) D Krawczyk | 4 | 7 | 6

== Other entry information ==
=== Wild cards ===
- (Croatia) Ivan Dodig / (Chinese Taipei) Latisha Chan
- (United Kingdom) Kyle Edmund / (United Kingdom) Olivia Nicholls
- (United Kingdom) Jamie Murray / (United States) Venus Williams
- (United Kingdom) Jonny O'Mara / (United Kingdom) Alicia Barnett
- ~~(United Kingdom) Ken Skupski / (United Kingdom) Heather Watson~~

=== Protected ranking ===
- ~~(Poland) Łukasz Kubot / (Ukraine) Marta Kostyuk~~
- (France) Édouard Roger-Vasselin / (France) Alizé Cornet

=== Alternates ===
- (Serbia) Nikola Ćaćić / (Serbia) Aleksandra Krunić
- (Belgium) Joran Vliegen / (Norway) Ulrikke Eikeri

=== Withdrawals ===
- (Poland) Łukasz Kubot / (Ukraine) Marta Kostyuk → replaced by (Serbia) Nikola Ćaćić / (Serbia) Aleksandra Krunić
- (United Kingdom) Ken Skupski / (United Kingdom) Heather Watson → replaced by (Belgium) Joran Vliegen / (Norway) Ulrikke Eikeri
