= 2022 Wimbledon Championships – Boys' doubles =

Boys' doubles
- 2022 Wimbledon Championships

Final
- Champions: (United States) Sebastian Gorzny (United States) Alex Michelsen
- Runners-up: (France) Gabriel Debru (France) Paul Inchauspé
- Score: 7–6^{(7–5)}, 6–3

Events
Singles	men	women		boys	girls
Doubles	men	women	mixed	boys	girls
WC Singles	men	women	quad
WC Doubles	men	women	quad
14&U Singles	boys	girls
Legends	men	women	mixed
- Wimbledon Championships

Sebastian Gorzny and Alex Michelsen defeated Gabriel Debru and Paul Inchauspé in the final, 7–6^{(7–5)}, 6–3 to win the boys' doubles tennis title at the 2022 Wimbledon Championships.

Edas Butvilas and Alejandro Manzanera Pertusa were the reigning champions, but Manzanera Pertusa was no longer eligible to participate in junior tournaments. Butvilas partnered Mili Poljičak, but they retired in the quarterfinals.

== Seeds ==
1. (Lithuania) Edas Butvilas / (Croatia) Mili Poljičak (quarterfinals, retired)
2. (Peru) Gonzalo Bueno / (Peru) Ignacio Buse (first round)
3. (United States) Nishesh Basavareddy / (Mexico) Rodrigo Pacheco Méndez (first round)
4. (Belgium) Gilles-Arnaud Bailly / (Czech Republic) Jakub Nicod (quarterfinals)
5. (France) Gabriel Debru / (France) Paul Inchauspé (final)
6. (Czech Republic) Jakub Menšík / (Poland) Olaf Pieczkowski (semifinals)
7. (Spain) Martín Landaluce / (Spain) Pedro Ródenas (semifinals)
8. (Slovenia) Bor Artnak / (Czech Republic) Hynek Bartoň (second round)

== Draw ==
Key

- Q = Qualifier
- WC = Wild card
- LL = Lucky loser
- Alt = Alternate
- ITF = ITF entry
- PR = Protected ranking
- SR = Special ranking
- SE = Special exempt
- JE = Junior exempt
- JR = Junior Accelerator Programme entrant
- CO = College Accelerator Programme entrant
- NG = Next Gen Accelerator Program entrant
- w/o = Walkover
- r = Retired
- d = Defaulted

=== Finals ===
Semifinals
5	(France) Gabriel Debru (France) Paul Inchauspé	3	7^{7}	[12]
6	(Czech Republic) Jakub Menšík (Poland) Olaf Pieczkowski	6	6^{4}	[10]
7	(Spain) Martín Landaluce (Spain) Pedro Ródenas	7^{8}	2	[9]
(United States) Sebastian Gorzny (United States) Alex Michelsen	6^{6}	6	[11]

Final
5	(France) Gabriel Debru (France) Paul Inchauspé	6^{5}	3
(United States) Sebastian Gorzny (United States) Alex Michelsen	7^{7}	6

=== Top half ===
First round
1	(Lithuania) Edas Butvilas (Croatia) Mili Poljičak	6	6
WC	(United Kingdom) Louis Bowden (United Kingdom) Matthew Rankin	3	0
(United States) Alexander Frusina (Australia) Hayden Jones	4	2
(United States) Ozan Colak (United States) Learner Tien	6	6
(Slovakia) Peter Naď (Poland) Martyn Pawelski	4	4
(Switzerland) Mika Brunold (United States) Nicholas Godsick	6	6
(Croatia) Matej Dodig (Poland) Borys Zgoła	1	2
5	(France) Gabriel Debru (France) Paul Inchauspé	6	6
3	(United States) Nishesh Basavareddy (Mexico) Rodrigo Pacheco Méndez	3	2
(Hong Kong) Coleman Wong (United States) Michael Zheng	6	6
WC	(United Kingdom) Luca Pow (United Kingdom) Henry Searle	7^{7}	4	[10]
(Thailand) Tanapatt Nirundorn (Canada) Jaden Weekes	6^{4}	6	[7]
(Belgium) Alexander Blockx (United States) Leanid Boika	2	6	[5]
(Switzerland) Dylan Dietrich (Switzerland) Kilian Feldbausch	6	4	[10]
(Japan) Lennon Roark Jones (Japan) Hayato Matsuoka	4	4
6	(Czech Republic) Jakub Menšík (Poland) Olaf Pieczkowski	6	6

Second round
1	(Lithuania) E Butvilas (Croatia) M Poljičak	6	7^{7}
(United States) O Colak (United States) L Tien	3	6^{5}
(Switzerland) M Brunold (United States) N Godsick	1	7^{7}	[8]
5	(France) G Debru (France) P Inchauspé	6	6^{2}	[10]
(Hong Kong) C Wong (United States) M Zheng	6	6^{11}	[12]
WC	(United Kingdom) L Pow (United Kingdom) H Searle	3	7^{13}	[10]
(Switzerland) D Dietrich (Switzerland) K Feldbausch	4	6^{5}
6	(Czech Republic) J Menšík (Poland) O Pieczkowski	6	7^{7}

Quarterfinals
1	(Lithuania) E Butvilas (Croatia) M Poljičak	2^{r}
5	(France) G Debru (France) P Inchauspé	5
(Hong Kong) C Wong (United States) M Zheng	3	6	[6]
6	(Czech Republic) J Menšík (Poland) O Pieczkowski	6	1	[10]

Semifinals
5	(France) G Debru (France) P Inchauspé	3	7^{7}	[12]
6	(Czech Republic) J Menšík (Poland) O Pieczkowski	6	6^{4}	[10]

=== Bottom half ===
First round
7	(Spain) Martín Landaluce (Spain) Pedro Ródenas	6	6
(Argentina) Juan Manuel La Serna (Argentina) Lautaro Midón	1	2
WC	(United Kingdom) Hugo Coquelin (United Kingdom) Phoenix Weir	6^{4}	6^{8}
(Belgium) Alessio Basile (Slovakia) Peter Benjamín Privara	7^{7}	7^{10}
(South Korea) Gerard Campaña Lee (Australia) Jeremy Jin	7^{7}	6^{2}	[7]
(United States) Aidan Kim (United States) Cooper Williams	6^{3}	7^{7}	[10]
(United States) Jonah Braswell (Croatia) Dino Prižmić	6	5	[8]
4	(Belgium) Gilles-Arnaud Bailly (Czech Republic) Jakub Nicod	2	7	[10]
8	(Slovenia) Bor Artnak (Czech Republic) Hynek Bartoň	3	7^{11}	[10]
(France) Paul Barbier Gazeu (France) Arthur Géa	6	6^{9}	[7]
(Namibia) Connor Henry van Schalkwyk (Paraguay) Martín Antonio Vergara del Puerto	5	6^{8}
(United States) Sebastian Gorzny (United States) Alex Michelsen	7	7^{10}
(New Zealand) Jack Loutit (Australia) Edward Winter	6	6
WC	(United Kingdom) Patrick Brady (United Kingdom) William Jansen	4	3
(Brazil) João Fonseca (Bolivia) Juan Carlos Prado Ángelo	3	7	[10]
2	(Peru) Gonzalo Bueno (Peru) Ignacio Buse	6	5	[8]

Second round
7	(Spain) M Landaluce (Spain) P Ródenas	6	6
(Belgium) A Basile (Slovakia) PB Privara	1	3
(United States) A Kim (United States) C Williams	7^{7}	3	[8]
4	(Belgium) G-A Bailly (Czech Republic) J Nicod	6^{4}	6	[10]
8	(Slovenia) B Artnak (Czech Republic) H Bartoň	3	6^{3}
(United States) S Gorzny (United States) A Michelsen	6	7^{7}
(New Zealand) J Loutit (Australia) E Winter	6^{4}	7^{7}	[10]
(Brazil) J Fonseca (Bolivia) JC Prado Ángelo	7^{7}	6^{3}	[6]

Quarterfinals
7	(Spain) M Landaluce (Spain) P Ródenas	6	3	[10]
4	(Belgium) G-A Bailly (Czech Republic) J Nicod	3	6	[5]
(United States) S Gorzny (United States) A Michelsen	6	6
(New Zealand) J Loutit (Australia) E Winter	1	4

Semifinals
7	(Spain) M Landaluce (Spain) P Ródenas	7^{8}	2	[9]
(United States) S Gorzny (United States) A Michelsen	6^{6}	6	[11]
