= 2022 Wimbledon Championships – Girls' doubles =

Girls' doubles
- 2022 Wimbledon Championships

Final
- Champions: (Netherlands) Rose Marie Nijkamp (Kenya) Angella Okutoyi
- Runners-up: (Canada) Kayla Cross (Canada) Victoria Mboko
- Score: 3–6, 6–4, [11–9]

Events
Singles	men	women		boys	girls
Doubles	men	women	mixed	boys	girls
WC Singles	men	women	quad
WC Doubles	men	women	quad
14&U Singles	boys	girls
Legends	men	women	mixed
- Wimbledon Championships

Rose Marie Nijkamp and Angella Okutoyi defeated Kayla Cross and Victoria Mboko in the final, 3–6, 6–4, [11–9] to win the girls' doubles tennis title at the 2022 Wimbledon Championships. They saved a championship point in the match tiebreaker. Okutoyi became the first Kenyan to win a major title.

Kristina Dmitruk and Diana Shnaider were the defending champions, but both were unable to participate. Dmitruk was no longer eligible to participate in junior tournaments, while both Dmitruk and Shnaider were prohibited from playing due to their Belarusian and Russian nationalities.

== Seeds ==
1. (Czech Republic) Nikola Bartůňková / (Switzerland) Céline Naef (semifinals)
2. (United States) Liv Hovde / (United States) Qavia Lopez (first round, withdrew)
3. (Croatia) Lucija Ćirić Bagarić / (Slovakia) Nikola Daubnerová (semifinals)
4. (Canada) Kayla Cross / (Canada) Victoria Mboko (final)
5. (United States) Alexis Blokhina / (Hungary) Luca Udvardy (first round)
6. (Slovakia) Irina Balus / (Australia) Taylah Preston (first round, withdrew)
7. (Argentina) Luciana Moyano / (Peru) Lucciana Pérez Alarcón (first round)
8. (Czech Republic) Kristýna Tomajková / (Slovakia) Nina Vargová (quarterfinals)

== Draw ==
Key

- Q = Qualifier
- WC = Wild card
- LL = Lucky loser
- Alt = Alternate
- ITF = ITF entry
- PR = Protected ranking
- SR = Special ranking
- SE = Special exempt
- JE = Junior exempt
- JR = Junior Accelerator Programme entrant
- CO = College Accelerator Programme entrant
- NG = Next Gen Accelerator Program entrant
- w/o = Walkover
- r = Retired
- d = Defaulted

=== Finals ===
Semifinals
1	(Czech Republic) Nikola Bartůňková (Switzerland) Céline Naef	4	4
4	(Canada) Kayla Cross (Canada) Victoria Mboko	6	6
3	(Croatia) Lucija Ćirić Bagarić (Slovakia) Nikola Daubnerová	3	4
(Netherlands) Rose Marie Nijkamp (Kenya) Angella Okutoyi	6	6

Final
4	(Canada) Kayla Cross (Canada) Victoria Mboko	6	4	[9]
(Netherlands) Rose Marie Nijkamp (Kenya) Angella Okutoyi	3	6	[11]

=== Top half ===
First round
1	(Czech Republic) Nikola Bartůňková (Switzerland) Céline Naef	6	6
(Germany) Carolina Kuhl (Czech Republic) Tereza Valentová	3	4
(United Kingdom) Sofia Johnson (United Kingdom) Daniela Piani	3	1
(Slovakia) Renáta Jamrichová (Poland) Olivia Lincer	6	6
WC	(United Kingdom) Hannah Klugman (United Kingdom) Hephzibah Oluwadare	6	4	[10]
(Poland) Weronika Ewald (Netherlands) Isis Louise van den Broek	3	6	[7]
(United States) Sonya Macavei (Czech Republic) Julie Štruplová	5	6	[10]
5	(United States) Alexis Blokhina (Hungary) Luca Udvardy	7	3	[2]
4	(Canada) Kayla Cross (Canada) Victoria Mboko	6	6
(Kazakhstan) Sandugash Kenzhibayeva (Kazakhstan) Zhanel Rustemova	3	3
(Germany) Ella Seidel (Germany) Joëlle Steur	6	4	[10]
(Ukraine) Anastasiya Lopata (Turkey) Ayşegül Mert	2	6	[5]
(United Kingdom) Jessica Matthews (United Kingdom) Jaquelyn Ogunwale	6	2	[8]
(Switzerland) Chelsea Fontenel (Denmark) Johanne Svendsen	3	6	[10]
WC	(United Kingdom) Talia Neilson Gatenby (United Kingdom) Mingge Xu	4	4
8	(Czech Republic) Kristýna Tomajková (Slovakia) Nina Vargová	6	6

Second round
1	(Czech Republic) N Bartůňková (Switzerland) C Naef	4	6	[10]
(Slovakia) R Jamrichová (Poland) O Lincer	6	3	[4]
WC	(United Kingdom) H Klugman (United Kingdom) H Oluwadare	6	6
(United States) S Macavei (Czech Republic) J Štruplová	4	3
4	(Canada) K Cross (Canada) V Mboko	6	6
(Germany) E Seidel (Germany) J Steur	4	3
(Switzerland) C Fontenel (Denmark) J Svendsen	6	4	[6]
8	(Czech Republic) K Tomajková (Slovakia) N Vargová	3	6	[10]

Quarterfinals
1	(Czech Republic) N Bartůňková (Switzerland) C Naef	6	6
WC	(United Kingdom) H Klugman (United Kingdom) H Oluwadare	0	1
4	(Canada) K Cross (Canada) V Mboko	1	7	[13]
8	(Czech Republic) K Tomajková (Slovakia) N Vargová	6	5	[11]

Semifinals
1	(Czech Republic) N Bartůňková (Switzerland) C Naef	4	4
4	(Canada) K Cross (Canada) V Mboko	6	6

=== Bottom half ===
First round
7	(Argentina) Luciana Moyano (Peru) Lucciana Pérez Alarcón	6	6^{2}	[10]
(Japan) Sayaka Ishii (Thailand) Lanlana Tararudee	1	7^{7}	[12]
(Serbia) Andrea Obradović (Kazakhstan) Aruzhan Sagandikova	6	3	[7]
(Canada) Annabelle Xu (Canada) Naomi Xu	2	6	[10]
WC	(United Kingdom) Isabelle Lacy (United Kingdom) Ella McDonald	4	4
(Chinese Taipei) Li Yu-yun (Japan) Sara Saito	6	6
(Belgium) Amelie Van Impe (Belgium) Amelia Waligora	6	5	[3]
3	(Croatia) Lucija Ćirić Bagarić (Slovakia) Nikola Daubnerová	1	7	[10]
6	(Slovakia) Irina Balus (Australia) Taylah Preston
(Czech Republic) Linda Klimovičová (Czech Republic) Dominika Šalková	_{w/o}
WC	(United Kingdom) Given Roach (United Kingdom) Millie Skelton	4	6^{6}
(Argentina) Lucía Peyre (United States) Mia Slama	6	7^{8}
(Netherlands) Rose Marie Nijkamp (Kenya) Angella Okutoyi	6	6
(Italy) Georgia Pedone (United States) Kaitlin Quevedo	4	4
(Bulgaria) Denislava Glushkova (Japan) Hayu Kinoshita	w/o
2	(United States) Liv Hovde (United States) Qavia Lopez

Second round
(Japan) S Ishii (Thailand) L Tararudee	6	6
(Canada) A Xu (Canada) N Xu	0	1
(Chinese Taipei) Y-y Li (Japan) S Saito	3	6^{5}
3	(Croatia) L Ćirić Bagarić (Slovakia) N Daubnerová	6	7^{7}
(Czech Republic) L Klimovičová (Czech Republic) D Šalková	3	7	[15]
(Argentina) L Peyre (United States) M Slama	6	5	[13]
(Netherlands) RM Nijkamp (Kenya) A Okutoyi	6	6
(Bulgaria) D Glushkova (Japan) H Kinoshita	2	3

Quarterfinals
(Japan) S Ishii (Thailand) L Tararudee	2	6^{3}
3	(Croatia) L Ćirić Bagarić (Slovakia) N Daubnerová	6	7^{7}
(Czech Republic) L Klimovičová (Czech Republic) D Šalková	7^{7}	4	[9]
(Netherlands) RM Nijkamp (Kenya) A Okutoyi	6^{5}	6	[11]

Semifinals
3	(Croatia) L Ćirić Bagarić (Slovakia) N Daubnerová	3	4
(Netherlands) RM Nijkamp (Kenya) A Okutoyi	6	6
