= 2021 Open de Rennes – Singles =

Singles
- 2021 Open de Rennes

Final
- Champion: (France) Benjamin Bonzi
- Runner-up: (Germany) Mats Moraing
- Score: 7–6^{(7–3)}, 7–6^{(7–3)}

Events
Singles	Doubles
← 2020 ·	Open de Rennes	· 2022 →

Arthur Rinderknech was the defending champion but lost in the semifinals to Benjamin Bonzi.

Bonzi won the title after defeating Mats Moraing 7–6^{(7–3)}, 7–6^{(7–3)} in the final.

== Seeds ==
1. (France) Richard Gasquet (semifinals)
2. (France) Arthur Rinderknech (semifinals)
3. (France) Benjamin Bonzi (champion)
4. (France) Gilles Simon (first round)
5. (United Kingdom) Andy Murray (second round)
6. (France) Lucas Pouille (quarterfinals)
7. (France) Grégoire Barrère (second round)
8. (Czech Republic) Tomáš Macháč (second round)

== Draw ==
=== Key ===
- Q = Qualifier
- WC = Wild card
- LL = Lucky loser
- Alt = Alternate
- SE = Special exempt
- PR = Protected ranking
- ITF = ITF entry
- JE = Junior exempt
- w/o = Walkover
- r = Retired
- d = Defaulted
- SR = Special ranking

=== Finals ===
Semifinals
1	(France) Richard Gasquet	4	7	2
(Germany) Mats Moraing	6	5	6
3	(France) Benjamin Bonzi	6^{9}	7^{7}	6
2	(France) Arthur Rinderknech	7^{11}	6^{4}	1

Final
(Germany) Mats Moraing	6^{3}	6^{3}
3	(France) Benjamin Bonzi	7^{7}	7^{7}

=== Top half ===
First round
1	(France) R Gasquet	7^{7}	6
WC	(France) K Jacquet	6^{4}	3
(Canada) B Schnur	4	4
Q	(France) C Chidekh	6	6
Q	(France) M Guinard	4	3
(Russia) R Safiullin	6	6
(Germany) Y Maden	3	1
5/WC	(United Kingdom) A Murray	6	6
4	(France) G Simon	3	2
Alt	(Russia) T Gabashvili	6	6
(United States) E Escobedo	7	6
(France) C Lestienne	5	1
(Germany) M Moraing	4	7	6
WC	(France) H Mayot	6	5	2
Q	(France) C Hemery	1	1
8	(Czech Republic) T Macháč	6	6

Second round
1	(France) R Gasquet	6	6
Q	(France) C Chidekh	1	4
(Russia) R Safiullin	6	4	6
5/WC	(United Kingdom) A Murray	2	6	1
Alt	(Russia) T Gabashvili	4	6	6
(United States) E Escobedo	6	2	3
(Germany) M Moraing	7^{11}	6
8	(Czech Republic) T Macháč	6^{9}	1

Quarterfinals
1	(France) R Gasquet	7^{8}	7
(Russia) R Safiullin	6^{6}	5
Alt	(Russia) T Gabashvili	2	6^{3}
(Germany) M Moraing	6	7^{7}

Semifinals
1	(France) R Gasquet	4	7	2
(Germany) M Moraing	6	5	6

=== Bottom half ===
First round
7	(France) G Barrère	7^{9}	7
(Netherlands) T van Rijthoven	6^{7}	5
Q	(Italy) A Bega	2	1
(United Kingdom) L Broady	6	6
(Poland) K Żuk	7	6
LL	(Germany) M Rosenkranz	5	3
(Sweden) E Ymer	3	4
3	(France) B Bonzi	6	6
6	(France) L Pouille	5	6	6
(France) M Janvier	7	4	3
LL	(France) D Added	3	4
(France) A Hoang	6	6
(Japan) G Soeda	6^{4}	4
(France) T Lamasine	7^{7}	6
(Germany) T Kamke	3	6	3
2	(France) A Rinderknech	6	3	6

Second round
7	(France) G Barrère	6^{7}	6	4
(United Kingdom) L Broady	7^{9}	4	6
(Poland) K Żuk	6^{3}	3
3	(France) B Bonzi	7^{7}	6
6	(France) L Pouille	3	6	6
(France) A Hoang	6	3	4
(France) T Lamasine	6^{8}	2
2	(France) A Rinderknech	7^{10}	6

Quarterfinals
(United Kingdom) L Broady	4	2
3	(France) B Bonzi	6	6
6	(France) L Pouille	3	6^{3}
2	(France) A Rinderknech	6	7^{7}

Semifinals
3	(France) B Bonzi	6^{9}	7^{7}	6
2	(France) A Rinderknech	7^{11}	6^{4}	1
