= 2022 Open de Rennes – Doubles =

Doubles
- 2022 Open de Rennes

Final
- Champions: (France) Jonathan Eysseric (Netherlands) David Pel
- Runners-up: (France) Dan Added (France) Albano Olivetti
- Score: 6–4, 6–4

Events
Singles	Doubles
- Open de Rennes

Bart Stevens and Tim van Rijthoven were the defending champions but only Stevens chose to defend his title, partnering Luke Johnson. Stevens lost in the first round to Gabriel Debru and Benoît Paire.

Jonathan Eysseric and David Pel won the title after defeating Dan Added and Albano Olivetti 6–4, 6–4 in the final.

== Seeds ==
1. (France) Jonathan Eysseric / (Netherlands) David Pel (champions)
2. (France) Dan Added / (France) Albano Olivetti (final)
3. (France) Théo Arribagé / (France) Fabien Reboul (semifinals)
4. (Germany) Fabian Fallert / (Germany) Hendrik Jebens (semifinals)

== Draw ==
Key

- Q = Qualifier
- WC = Wild card
- LL = Lucky loser
- Alt = Alternate
- ITF = ITF entry
- PR = Protected ranking
- SR = Special ranking
- SE = Special exempt
- JE = Junior exempt
- JR = Junior Accelerator Programme entrant
- CO = College Accelerator Programme entrant
- NG = Next Gen Accelerator Program entrant
- w/o = Walkover
- r = Retired
- d = Defaulted

First round
1	(France) J Eysseric (Netherlands) D Pel	6	6
(United States) Jack Vance (United States) Tennyson Whiting	4	2
(Netherlands) G Brouwer (Netherlands) M Hermans	4	6^{5}
(France) C Chidekh (France) L Sanchez	6	7^{7}
3	(France) T Arribagé (France) F Reboul	6	6
(United States) B Battistone (United States) Jamie Vance	3	4
WC	(France) G Debru (France) B Paire	4	7^{7}	[13]
(United Kingdom) L Johnson (Netherlands) B Stevens	6	6^{3}	[11]
I Liutarevich (Ukraine) V Uzhylovskyi	5	6	[3]
(Australia) A Taylor (Australia) J Taylor	7	1	[10]
(Sweden) F Bergevi (Sweden) S Freund	4	4
4	(Germany) F Fallert (Germany) H Jebens	6	6
(Belgium) J De Loore (Belgium) Y Mertens	6	6
Alt	(Germany) D Masur (Germany) MH Rehberg	2	2
(France) A Reymond (France) C Tabur	3	3
2	(France) D Added (France) A Olivetti	6	6

Quarterfinals
1	(France) J Eysseric (Netherlands) D Pel	6	6
(France) C Chidekh (France) L Sanchez	3	4
3	(France) T Arribagé (France) F Reboul	w/o
WC	(France) G Debru (France) B Paire
(Australia) A Taylor (Australia) J Taylor	3	2
4	(Germany) F Fallert (Germany) H Jebens	6	6
(Belgium) J De Loore (Belgium) Y Mertens	4	3
2	(France) D Added (France) A Olivetti	6	6

Semifinals
1	(France) J Eysseric (Netherlands) D Pel	7^{7}	3	[15]
3	(France) T Arribagé (France) F Reboul	6^{2}	6	[13]
4	(Germany) F Fallert (Germany) H Jebens	5	7	[5]
2	(France) D Added (France) A Olivetti	7	5	[10]

Final
1	(France) J Eysseric (Netherlands) D Pel	6	6
2	(France) D Added (France) A Olivetti	4	4
