= 2022 Libéma Open – Men's doubles =

Men's doubles
- 2022 Libéma Open

Final
- Champions: (Netherlands) Wesley Koolhof (United Kingdom) Neal Skupski
- Runners-up: (Australia) Matthew Ebden (Australia) Max Purcell
- Score: 4–6, 7–5, [10–6]

Events
| Singles | men | women |
| Doubles | men | women |
| ← 2019 · | Libéma Open | · 2023 → |

Wesley Koolhof and Neal Skupski defeated Matthew Ebden and Max Purcell in the final, 4–6, 7–5, [10–6] to win the men's doubles tennis title at the 2022 Rosmalen Grass Court Championships.

Dominic Inglot and Austin Krajicek were the defending champions from when the event was last held in 2019, but they chose not to defend their title.

== Seeds ==
1. (France) Pierre-Hugues Herbert / (France) Nicolas Mahut (quarterfinals)
2. (Netherlands) Wesley Koolhof / (United Kingdom) Neal Skupski (champions)
3. (El Salvador) Marcelo Arévalo / (Netherlands) Jean-Julien Rojer (withdrew)
4. (Australia) Matthew Ebden / (Australia) Max Purcell (final)

== Draw ==
=== Key ===
- Q = Qualifier
- WC = Wild card
- LL = Lucky loser
- Alt = Alternate
- SE = Special exempt
- PR = Protected ranking
- ITF = ITF entry
- JE = Junior exempt
- w/o = Walkover
- r = Retired
- d = Defaulted
- SR = Special ranking

=== Draw ===
First round
1 | (France) P-H Herbert (France) N Mahut | 7^{9} | 6
Alt | (Netherlands) G Brouwer (Netherlands) T van Rijthoven | 6^{7} | 4
(Belgium) S Gillé (Belgium) J Vliegen | 6^{13} | 4
(South Africa) R Klaasen (Brazil) M Melo | 7^{15} | 6
4 | (Australia) M Ebden (Australia) M Purcell | 6 | 6^{3} | [10]
(Australia) A de Minaur (Australia) L Saville | 4 | 7^{7} | [7]
(Monaco) H Nys (France) É Roger-Vasselin | 6^{5} | 6 | [10]
WC | (Netherlands) J de Jong (Netherlands) B Stevens | 7^{7} | 1 | [8]
(Netherlands) R Haase (Netherlands) M Middelkoop | 6 | 6
WC | (Netherlands) T Griekspoor; D Medvedev | 4 | 4
(Czech Republic) R Jebavý (Ukraine) D Molchanov | 3 | 6 | [7]
Alt | (United States) B Nakashima (Finland) E Ruusuvuori | 6 | 3 | [10]
(United States) M McDonald (Netherlands) B van de Zandschulp | 6 | 4 | [10]
(United States) T Fritz (United States) T Paul | 3 | 6 | [7]
PR | (Chile) J Peralta (Spain) D Vega Hernández | 3 | 6^{5}
2 | (Netherlands) W Koolhof (United Kingdom) N Skupski | 6 | 7^{7}

Quarterfinals
1 | (France) P-H Herbert (France) N Mahut | 6^{6} | 4
(South Africa) R Klaasen (Brazil) M Melo | 7^{8} | 6
4 | (Australia) M Ebden (Australia) M Purcell | 2 | 6 | [10]
(Monaco) H Nys (France) É Roger-Vasselin | 6 | 4 | [7]
(Netherlands) R Haase (Netherlands) M Middelkoop | w/o
Alt | (United States) B Nakashima (Finland) E Ruusuvuori
(United States) M McDonald (Netherlands) B van de Zandschulp | 7^{7} | 2 | [12]
2 | (Netherlands) W Koolhof (United Kingdom) N Skupski | 6^{4} | 6 | [14]

Semifinals
(South Africa) R Klaasen (Brazil) M Melo | 6 | 5 | [6]
4 | (Australia) M Ebden (Australia) M Purcell | 1 | 7 | [10]
(Netherlands) R Haase (Netherlands) M Middelkoop | 3 | 2
2 | (Netherlands) W Koolhof (United Kingdom) N Skupski | 6 | 6

Final
4 | (Australia) M Ebden (Australia) M Purcell | 6 | 5 | [6]
2 | (Netherlands) W Koolhof (United Kingdom) N Skupski | 4 | 7 | [10]
