= 2022 Wimbledon Championships =

- Date: 27 June – 10 July
- Edition: 135th
- Category: Grand Slam (ITF)
- Draw: 128S / 64D / 32XD
- Prize money: £40,350,000
- Surface: Grass
- Location: Church Road; SW19, Wimbledon, London, United Kingdom
- Venue: All England Lawn Tennis and Croquet Club

Champions

Men's singles
- (Serbia) Novak Djokovic

Women's singles
- (Kazakhstan) Elena Rybakina

Men's doubles
- (Australia) Matthew Ebden / (Australia) Max Purcell

Women's doubles
- (Czech Republic) Barbora Krejčíková / (Czech Republic) Kateřina Siniaková

Mixed doubles
- (United Kingdom) Neal Skupski / (United States) Desirae Krawczyk

Wheelchair men's singles
- (Japan) Shingo Kunieda

Wheelchair women's singles
- (Netherlands) Diede de Groot

Wheelchair quad singles
- (Netherlands) Sam Schröder

Wheelchair men's doubles
- (Argentina) Gustavo Fernández / (Japan) Shingo Kunieda

Wheelchair women's doubles
- (Japan) Yui Kamiji / (United States) Dana Mathewson

Wheelchair quad doubles
- (Netherlands) Sam Schroder / (Netherlands) Niels Vink

Boys' singles
- (Croatia) Mili Poljičak

Girls' singles
- (United States) Liv Hovde

Boys' doubles
- (United States) Sebastian Gorzny / (United States) Alex Michelsen

Girls' doubles
- (Netherlands) Rose Marie Nijkamp / (Kenya) Angella Okutoyi

Boys' 14&U singles
- (South Korea) Cho Se-hyuk

Girls' 14&U singles
- (Romania) Alexia Ioana Tatu

Gentlemen's invitation doubles
- (United States) Bob Bryan / (United States) Mike Bryan

Ladies' invitation doubles
- (Belgium) Kim Clijsters / (Switzerland) Martina Hingis

Mixed invitation doubles
- (Serbia) Nenad Zimonjić / (France) Marion Bartoli
- Wimbledon Championships

The 2022 Wimbledon Championships was a Grand Slam tier tennis tournament that took place at the All England Lawn Tennis and Croquet Club in Wimbledon, London, United Kingdom. Novak Djokovic successfully defended his gentlemen's singles title to claim his 21st major title, defeating Nick Kyrgios in the final. Ashleigh Barty was the reigning ladies' champion, but did not defend her title after retiring from professional tennis in March 2022. The ladies' singles title was won by Elena Rybakina, who defeated Ons Jabeur in the final.

This year, the AELTC barred Russian and Belarusian players from competing because of the Russian invasion of Ukraine. In reaction, the WTA, ATP, and ITF withdrew ranking points from the tournament.

== Tournament ==
The tournament was played on grass courts, with all main draw matches played at the All England Lawn Tennis and Croquet Club, Wimbledon from 27 June to 10 July 2022. Initial wild card entries were first announced on 14 June 2022. Qualifying matches were played from 20 June to 23 June 2022 at the Bank of England Sports Ground in Roehampton.

The 2022 championships were the 135th edition, the 128th staging of the ladies’ singles championship event, the 54th in the Open Era, and the third Grand Slam tournament of the year. The tournament was being run by the International Tennis Federation (ITF) and included in the 2022 ATP Tour and the 2022 WTA Tour calendars under the Grand Slam category, as well as the 2022 ITF tours for junior and wheelchair competitions respectively. The tournament consisted of men's (singles and doubles), women's (singles and doubles), mixed doubles, boys' (under 18 – singles and doubles, under 14 – singles), girls' (under 18 – singles and doubles, under 14 – singles), which were a part of the Grade A category of tournaments for under 18, and singles & doubles events for men's and women's wheelchair tennis players. This edition marked the return of the gentlemen's and ladies' invitational doubles competitions for the first time since 2019, along with the introduction of a new mixed invitational doubles draw.

This was the tournament's first edition with a scheduled order of play on the first Sunday during the event, dubbed "Middle Sunday". Prior to the 2022 edition, the tournament had seen only four exceptions to the tradition of withholding competition on Middle Sunday to accommodate delayed matches during championships that were heavily disrupted by rain. Additionally, this was the first edition of the tournament to have a champions tie break rule in the final set. Unlike in 2019 and 2021, which had a standard seven-point tie break at 12 games all in the final set, this tie break was played up to 10 points when a match reaches 6 games all, to be won by two clear points to win the match.

To commemorate the centenary of the opening of Centre Court in 1922 and to mark the inauguration of middle Sunday play, several former singles champions were presented at a special celebration on Sunday 3 July 2022. The event was hosted by Sue Barker and Clare Balding with John McEnroe, who paid tribute to Barker's thirty years as the BBC's Wimbledon presenter. The champions were presented first by the number of singles titles won and then chronologically within that category from furthest to most recent winners. In order of presentation the champions were: one-time winners – Angela Mortimer, Ann Jones, Stan Smith, Jan Kodeš, Patrick "Pat" Cash, Conchita Martínez, Martina Hingis, Goran Ivanišević, Lleyton Hewitt, Marion Bartoli, Angelique Kerber and Simona Halep; two-time winners – Stefan Edberg, Rafael Nadal, Petra Kvitová and Andy Murray; three-time winners – Margaret Smith Court, John Newcombe, Chris Evert and John McEnroe; four-time winner Rod Laver; five-time winners Björn Borg and Venus Williams; six-time winners Billie Jean King and Novak Djokovic; and eight-time winner Roger Federer. The only nine-time singles champion, Martina Navratilova, cancelled her appearance after contracting COVID-19 on the morning of the event. British former player Tim Henman was also presented to reminisce about his matches on the court as a member of the Wimbledon Committee of Management.

== Singles players ==
- Gentlemen's singles

| Champion | | Runner-up | |
|---|---|---|---|
| (Serbia) Novak Djokovic [1] | | (Australia) Nick Kyrgios | |
Semifinals out
| (United Kingdom) Cameron Norrie [9] | | (Spain) Rafael Nadal [2] | |
Quarterfinals out
| (Italy) Jannik Sinner [10] | (Belgium) David Goffin | (Chile) Cristian Garín | (United States) Taylor Fritz [11] |
4th round out
| (Netherlands) Tim van Rijthoven (WC) | (Spain) Carlos Alcaraz [5] | (United States) Frances Tiafoe [23] | (United States) Tommy Paul [30] |
| (Australia) Alex de Minaur [19] | (United States) Brandon Nakashima | (Australia) Jason Kubler (Q) | (Netherlands) Botic van de Zandschulp [21] |
3rd round out
| (Serbia) Miomir Kecmanović [25] | (Georgia (country)) Nikoloz Basilashvili [22] | (United States) John Isner [20] | (Germany) Oscar Otte [32] |
| (France) Ugo Humbert | (Kazakhstan) Alexander Bublik | (United States) Steve Johnson | (Czech Republic) Jiří Veselý |
| (United States) Jenson Brooksby [29] | (United Kingdom) Liam Broady (WC) | (Colombia) Daniel Elahi Galán | (Greece) Stefanos Tsitsipas [4] |
| (United States) Jack Sock (Q) | (Slovakia) Alex Molčan | (France) Richard Gasquet | (Italy) Lorenzo Sonego [27] |
2nd round out
| (Australia) Thanasi Kokkinakis | (Chile) Alejandro Tabilo | (France) Quentin Halys | (United States) Reilly Opelka [15] |
| (Sweden) Mikael Ymer | (United Kingdom) Andy Murray | (United States) Christian Harrison (Q) | (Netherlands) Tallon Griekspoor |
| (Norway) Casper Ruud [3] | (Argentina) Sebastián Báez [31] | (Germany) Maximilian Marterer (Q) | (Serbia) Dušan Lajović |
| (Spain) Jaume Munar | (United Kingdom) Ryan Peniston (WC) | (France) Adrian Mannarino | (Spain) Alejandro Davidovich Fokina |
| (France) Hugo Grenier (LL) | (France) Benjamin Bonzi | (United Kingdom) Jack Draper | (Argentina) Diego Schwartzman [12] |
| (Canada) Denis Shapovalov [13] | (Spain) Roberto Bautista Agut [17] | (Serbia) Filip Krajinović [26] | (Australia) Jordan Thompson |
| (United States) Maxime Cressy | (Austria) Dennis Novak (Q) | (United States) Marcos Giron | (United Kingdom) Alastair Gray (WC) |
| (United States) Mackenzie McDonald | (Finland) Emil Ruusuvuori | (France) Hugo Gaston | (Lithuania) Ričardas Berankis |
1st round out
| (South Korea) Kwon Soon-woo | (Poland) Kamil Majchrzak | (Serbia) Laslo Djere | (Australia) John Millman |
| (Czech Republic) Lukáš Rosol (Q) | (France) Benoît Paire | (Argentina) Federico Delbonis | (Spain) Carlos Taberner |
| (Switzerland) Stan Wawrinka (WC) | (Germany) Daniel Altmaier | (Australia) James Duckworth | (France) Enzo Couacaud (Q) |
| (Germany) Peter Gojowczyk | (United Kingdom) Jay Clarke (WC) | (Italy) Fabio Fognini | (Germany) Jan-Lennard Struff |
| (Spain) Albert Ramos Viñolas | (Argentina) Tomás Martín Etcheverry | (Moldova) Radu Albot (Q) | (Japan) Taro Daniel |
| (Italy) Andrea Vavassori (Q) | (Slovenia) Aljaž Bedene (PR) | (Hungary) Márton Fucsovics | (Spain) Pablo Carreño Busta [16] |
| (Spain) Pablo Andújar | (Brazil) Thiago Monteiro | (Switzerland) Henri Laaksonen | (Bulgaria) Grigor Dimitrov [18] |
| (Spain) Fernando Verdasco | (Australia) Max Purcell (Q) | (Argentina) Federico Coria | (Poland) Hubert Hurkacz [7] |
| (Sweden) Elias Ymer (LL) | (Switzerland) Marc-Andrea Hüsler (Q) | (Czech Republic) Zdeněk Kolář (LL) | (Kazakhstan) Mikhail Kukushkin (Q) |
| (Bolivia) Hugo Dellien | (Belgium) Zizou Bergs (WC) | (Slovakia) Lukáš Klein (Q) | (United States) Stefan Kozlov (LL) |
| (France) Arthur Rinderknech | (Germany) Nicola Kuhn (Q) | (Germany) Dominik Koepfer | (Hungary) Attila Balázs (PR) |
| (Czech Republic) Jiří Lehečka | (United Kingdom) Paul Jubb (WC) | (Spain) Roberto Carballés Baena | (Switzerland) Alexander Ritschard (Q) |
| (Canada) Félix Auger-Aliassime [6] | (Spain) Bernabé Zapata Miralles (Q) | (Argentina) Facundo Bagnis | (United Kingdom) Dan Evans [28] |
| (Denmark) Holger Rune [24] | (Spain) Pedro Martínez | (Chinese Taipei) Tseng Chun-hsin | (Italy) Lorenzo Musetti |
| (Portugal) Nuno Borges (LL) | (Portugal) João Sousa | (Japan) Yoshihito Nishioka | (Spain) Feliciano López |
| (United States) Denis Kudla | (Australia) Alexei Popyrin | (United States) Sam Querrey | (Argentina) Francisco Cerúndolo |

- Ladies' singles

| Champion | | Runner-up | |
|---|---|---|---|
| (Kazakhstan) Elena Rybakina [17] | | (Tunisia) Ons Jabeur [3] | |
Semifinals out
| (Romania) Simona Halep [16] | | (Germany) Tatjana Maria | |
Quarterfinals out
| (Australia) Ajla Tomljanović | (United States) Amanda Anisimova [20] | (Czech Republic) Marie Bouzková | (Germany) Jule Niemeier |
4th round out
| (France) Alizé Cornet | (Croatia) Petra Martić | (Spain) Paula Badosa [4] | (France) Harmony Tan |
| (France) Caroline Garcia | (Belgium) Elise Mertens [24] | (Latvia) Jeļena Ostapenko [12] | (United Kingdom) Heather Watson |
3rd round out
| (Poland) Iga Świątek [1] | (Czech Republic) Barbora Krejčíková [13] | (China) Zheng Qinwen | (United States) Jessica Pegula [8] |
| (Czech Republic) Petra Kvitová [25] | (Poland) Magdalena Fręch | (United States) Coco Gauff [11] | (United Kingdom) Katie Boulter (WC) |
| (United States) Alison Riske-Amritraj [28] | (China) Zhang Shuai [33] | (Germany) Angelique Kerber [15] | (France) Diane Parry |
| (Greece) Maria Sakkari [5] | (Romania) Irina-Camelia Begu | (Slovenia) Kaja Juvan | (Ukraine) Lesia Tsurenko |
2nd round out
| (Netherlands) Lesley Pattinama Kerkhove (LL) | (United States) Claire Liu | (United States) Catherine Harrison (Q) | (Switzerland) Viktorija Golubic |
| (Belgium) Greet Minnen | (Canada) Bianca Andreescu | (Slovakia) Kristína Kučová | (United Kingdom) Harriet Dart |
| (Romania) Irina Bara | (Romania) Ana Bogdan | (Slovakia) Anna Karolína Schmiedlová | (Belgium) Kirsten Flipkens (PR) |
| (Romania) Mihaela Buzărnescu | (United States) Lauren Davis | (Spain) Sara Sorribes Tormo [32] | (Czech Republic) Karolína Plíšková [6] |
| (United States) Ann Li | (Poland) Maja Chwalińska (Q) | (Ukraine) Marta Kostyuk | (United Kingdom) Emma Raducanu [10] |
| (Poland) Magda Linette | (Hungary) Panna Udvardy | (Japan) Mai Hontama (Q) | (Poland) Katarzyna Kawa (Q) |
| (Bulgaria) Viktoriya Tomova | (Romania) Sorana Cîrstea [26] | (Italy) Elisabetta Cocciaretto (PR) | (Belgium) Yanina Wickmayer (Q) |
| (China) Wang Qiang | (Hungary) Dalma Gálfi | (Ukraine) Anhelina Kalinina [29] | (Estonia) Anett Kontaveit [2] |
1st round out
| (Croatia) Jana Fett (Q) | (United Kingdom) Sonay Kartal (WC) | (Spain) Nuria Parrizas-Diaz | (Kazakhstan) Yulia Putintseva [27] |
| (Switzerland) Jil Teichmann [18] | (Netherlands) Arantxa Rus | (Germany) Andrea Petković | (Belgium) Maryna Zanevska |
| (Spain) Garbiñe Muguruza [9] | (United States) Sloane Stephens | (United States) Emina Bektas (Q) | (United States) CoCo Vandeweghe (LL) |
| (United States) Shelby Rogers [30] | (Brazil) Laura Pigossi | (Spain) Rebeka Masarova | (Croatia) Donna Vekić |
| (United States) Louisa Chirico (Q) | (France) Chloé Paquet | (Ukraine) Dayana Yastremska | (Italy) Jasmine Paolini |
| (Italy) Camila Giorgi [21] | (Sweden) Rebecca Peterson | (Australia) Jaimee Fourlis (Q) | (Czech Republic) Karolína Muchová |
| (Romania) Elena-Gabriela Ruse | (Germany) Nastasja Schunk (Q) | (United States) Madison Brengle | (China) Yuan Yue (LL) |
| (United States) Christina McHale (Q) | (United States) Serena Williams (WC) | (France) Clara Burel | (Czech Republic) Tereza Martincová |
| (United States) Danielle Collins [7] | (Italy) Lucia Bronzetti | (Czech Republic) Kateřina Siniaková | (Switzerland) Ylena In-Albon |
| (Japan) Misaki Doi | (United Kingdom) Katie Swan (WC) | (United Kingdom) Yuriko Miyazaki (WC) | (Belgium) Alison Van Uytvanck |
| (France) Kristina Mladenovic | (Mexico) Fernanda Contreras Gómez (Q) | (Slovenia) Tamara Zidanšek | (Colombia) Camila Osorio |
| (Estonia) Kaia Kanepi [31] | (Denmark) Clara Tauson | (Canada) Rebecca Marino | (Sweden) Mirjam Björklund (Q) |
| (Australia) Zoe Hives (Q) | (Australia) Daria Saville (WC) | (Australia) Astra Sharma (Q) | (Serbia) Aleksandra Krunić |
| (Italy) Martina Trevisan [22] | (Georgia (country)) Ekaterine Gorgodze | (China) Zhu Lin | (France) Océane Dodin |
| (Switzerland) Belinda Bencic [14] | (Germany) Tamara Korpatsch | (Australia) Maddison Inglis (Q) | (Brazil) Beatriz Haddad Maia [23] |
| (Hungary) Anna Bondár | (United Kingdom) Jodie Burrage (WC) | (China) Wang Xiyu | (United States) Bernarda Pera |

== Events ==
=== Gentlemen's singles ===
- (Serbia) Novak Djokovic def. (Australia) Nick Kyrgios, 4–6, 6–3, 6–4, 7–6^{(7–3)}

=== Ladies' singles ===
- (Kazakhstan) Elena Rybakina def. (Tunisia) Ons Jabeur, 3–6, 6–2, 6–2

=== Gentlemen's doubles ===
- (Australia) Matthew Ebden / (Australia) Max Purcell def. (Croatia) Nikola Mektić / (Croatia) Mate Pavić, 7–6^{(7–5)}, 6–7^{(3–7)}, 4–6, 6–4, 7–6^{(10–2)}

=== Ladies' doubles ===
- (Czech Republic) Barbora Krejčíková / (Czech Republic) Kateřina Siniaková def. (Belgium) Elise Mertens / (China) Zhang Shuai, 6–2, 6–4

=== Mixed doubles ===
- (United Kingdom) Neal Skupski / (United States) Desirae Krawczyk def. (Australia) Matthew Ebden / (Australia) Samantha Stosur, 6–4, 6–3

=== Wheelchair gentlemen's singles ===
- (Japan) Shingo Kunieda def. (United Kingdom) Alfie Hewett, 4–6, 7–5, 7–6^{(10–5)}

=== Wheelchair ladies' singles ===
- (Netherlands) Diede de Groot def. (Japan) Yui Kamiji, 6–4, 6–2

=== Wheelchair quad singles ===
- (Netherlands) Sam Schröder def. (Netherlands) Niels Vink, 7–6^{(7–5)}, 6–1

=== Wheelchair gentlemen's doubles ===
- (Argentina) Gustavo Fernandez / (Japan) Shingo Kunieda def. (United Kingdom) Alfie Hewett / (United Kingdom) Gordon Reid, 6–3, 6–1

=== Wheelchair ladies' doubles ===
- (Japan) Yui Kamiji / (United States) Dana Mathewson def. (Netherlands) Diede de Groot / (Netherlands) Aniek van Koot, 6–1, 7–5

=== Wheelchair quad doubles ===
- (Netherlands) Sam Schröder / (Netherlands) Niels Vink def. (United Kingdom) Andy Lapthorne / (United States) David Wagner, 6–7^{(4–7)}, 6–2, 6–3

=== Boys' singles ===
- (Croatia) Mili Poljičak def. (United States) Michael Zheng, 7–6^{(7–2)}, 7–6^{(7–3)}

=== Girls' singles ===
- (United States) Liv Hovde def. (Hungary) Luca Udvardy, 6–3, 6–4

=== Boys' doubles ===
- (United States) Sebastian Gorzny / (United States) Alex Michelsen def. (France) Gabriel Debru / (France) Paul Inchauspé, 7–6^{(7–5)}, 6–3

=== Girls' doubles ===
- (Netherlands) Rose Marie Nijkamp / (Kenya) Angella Okutoyi def. (Canada) Kayla Cross / (Canada) Victoria Mboko, 3–6, 6–4, [11–9]

=== Boys' 14&U singles ===
- (South Korea) Cho Se-hyuk def. (United States) Carel Aubriel Ngounoue, 7–6^{(7–5)}, 6–3

=== Girls' 14&U singles ===
- (Romania) Alexia Ioana Tatu def. (Romania) Andreea Diana Soare, 7–6^{(7–2)}, 6–4

=== Gentlemen's invitation doubles ===
- (United States) Bob Bryan / (United States) Mike Bryan def. (Belgium) Xavier Malisse / (Cyprus) Marcos Baghdatis, 6–3, 6–4

=== Ladies' invitation doubles ===
- (Belgium) Kim Clijsters / (Switzerland) Martina Hingis def. (Slovakia) Daniela Hantuchová / (United Kingdom) Laura Robson, 6–4, 6–2

=== Mixed invitation doubles ===
- (Serbia) Nenad Zimonjić / (France) Marion Bartoli def. (Australia) Todd Woodbridge / (Zimbabwe) Cara Black, 7–6^{(7–1)}, 6–1

== Prize money ==
The Wimbledon Championships total prize money for 2022 is a record £40,350,000, an increase of 15.23% compared to 2021 and 6.18% vs 2019 when the event was last played with a full capacity crowd.

| Event | W | F | SF | QF | Round of 16 | Round of 32 | Round of 64 | Round of 128^{1} | Q3 | Q2 | Q1 |
| Singles | £2,000,000 | £1,050,000 | £535,000 | £310,000 | £190,000 | £120,000 | £78,000 | £50,000 | £32,000 | £19,000 | £11,000 |
| Doubles * | £540,000 | £270,000 | £135,000 | £67,000 | £33,000 | £20,000 | £12,500 | —N/a | —N/a | —N/a | —N/a |
| Mixed Doubles * | £124,000 | £62,000 | £31,000 | £16,000 | £7,500 | £3,750 | —N/a | —N/a | —N/a | —N/a | —N/a |
| Wheelchair Singles | £51,000 | £26,000 | £17,500 | £12,000 | —N/a | —N/a | —N/a | —N/a | —N/a | —N/a | —N/a |
| Wheelchair Doubles * | £22,000 | £11,000 | £6,500 | —N/a | —N/a | —N/a | —N/a | —N/a | —N/a | —N/a | —N/a |
| Quad Singles | £51,000 | £26,000 | £17,500 | £12,000 | —N/a | —N/a | —N/a | —N/a | —N/a | —N/a | —N/a |
| Quad Doubles * | £22,000 | £11,000 | £6,500 | —N/a | —N/a | —N/a | —N/a | —N/a | —N/a | —N/a | —N/a |

*per team

== Controversy regarding the participation of Russian and Belarusian players ==
In April 2022, the AELTC announced that players representing Russia or Belarus would not be allowed to enter the upcoming Championships as a consequence of Russia's invasion of Ukraine, stating that "it would be unacceptable for the Russian regime to derive any benefits from the involvement of Russian or Belarusian players", and citing guidance given by the British government. The Lawn Tennis Association (LTA) also banned players representing Russia and Belarus from other tennis tournaments taking place in the UK. Outside of the Davis Cup and the Billie Jean King Cup, players from these countries were allowed to compete in other tournaments, including at the Grand Slam level at the year's French Open and US Open, as neutral players without national flags.

The ban attracted criticism from many players, including from defending and six-time champion Novak Djokovic, who described it as "crazy". Andrey Rublev, one of the players affected by the ban, accused the AELTC of making an "illogical" and "discriminatory" decision. Others, such as Ukrainians Marta Kostyuk and Sergiy Stakhovsky, came out in support of the ban. The three international governing bodies of tennis—the ATP, WTA, and ITF—criticised the decision, and on 20 May 2022 they stripped the tournament of its ranking points, on the basis that participation should be based on merit rather than nationality and that the unilateral decision by the AELTC contrasts with the remainder of the tour. This decision received criticism as well, with two-time men's singles champion Andy Murray commenting that the removal of ranking points will likely not affect participation in the event and had frustrated players.

The WTA and the ATP each levied $1 million in fines against the AELTC and the LTA as a consequence of the ban.

| Preceded by 2022 French Open | Grand Slam Tournaments | Succeeded by 2022 US Open |
| Preceded by 2021 Wimbledon Championships | The Championships, Wimbledon | Succeeded by 2023 Wimbledon Championships |
