= 2022 Wimbledon Championships – Men's singles =

Tennis championship

Gentlemen's singles
- 2022 Wimbledon Championships

Final
- Champion: (Serbia) Novak Djokovic
- Runner-up: (Australia) Nick Kyrgios
- Score: 4–6, 6–3, 6–4, 7–6^{(7–3)}

Details
- Draw: 128
- Seeds: 32

Events
Singles	men	women		boys	girls
Doubles	men	women	mixed	boys	girls
WC Singles	men	women	quad
WC Doubles	men	women	quad
14&U Singles	boys	girls
Legends	men	women	mixed
- Wimbledon Championships

Three-time defending champion Novak Djokovic defeated Nick Kyrgios in the final, 4–6, 6–3, 6–4, 7–6^{(7–3)} to win the gentlemen's singles tennis title at the 2022 Wimbledon Championships. It was his seventh Wimbledon title and 21st major singles title overall. Djokovic was the fifth man in the Open Era to win four consecutive titles at one major (joining Björn Borg, Pete Sampras, Roger Federer, and Rafael Nadal). By reaching his 32nd men's singles major final, he surpassed Federer's all-time record. Djokovic became the first player (male or female) to win 80 matches at all four majors with his first-round win. Because the Association of Tennis Professionals (ATP) decided not to award ranking points in response to Wimbledon's banning of Russian and Belarusian players, Djokovic dropped out of the top five in the ATP rankings after winning the tournament.

Nadal withdrew before the semifinals due to a torn abdominal muscle. It was the first time a man withdrew from a Wimbledon semifinal or final since Frank Shields in 1931. This was the two-time champion's final appearance at Wimbledon.

This was the first edition of Wimbledon to feature a champions (Note: also referred to as super tie-break) tiebreak (10-point tiebreak), when the score reaches six games all in the fifth set. (Note: The previous tie-break rule was a 7-point tie-break, when the score reached twelve games all in the fifth set.) Alejandro Davidovich Fokina defeated Hubert Hurkacz in the first round in the first main-draw 10-point tiebreak at Wimbledon. It was the first Wimbledon since the introduction of the ATP rankings in 1973, and the first major since the 1999 Australian Open, (Note: Then Pete Sampras as the world No. 1 and Marcelo Ríos as No. 2.) where both the reigning world No. 1 and No. 2 (Daniil Medvedev and Alexander Zverev, respectively) did not compete; Medvedev was prohibited from playing due to his Russian nationality, while Zverev was recovering from an ankle injury sustained at the French Open. This marked the first edition of Wimbledon since 1998 not to feature record eight-time champion Federer, resulting in his dropping out of the ATP rankings for the first time since 1998 (Federer would retire from professional tennis later that year). Kyrgios was the first unseeded man to reach a major final since Jo-Wilfried Tsonga at the 2008 Australian Open and the first Australian man to reach a major final since Lleyton Hewitt at the 2005 Australian Open. Feliciano López made his 81st (and final) main-draw major appearance, tying Federer's all-time record. John Isner broke Ivo Karlović's record of 13,728 career aces in his third-round match against Jannik Sinner.

== Seeds ==
All seeds per ATP rankings.

1. (Serbia) Novak Djokovic (champion)
2. (Spain) Rafael Nadal (semi-finals, withdrew due to an abdominal tear)
3. (Norway) Casper Ruud (second round)
4. (Greece) Stefanos Tsitsipas (third round)
5. (Spain) Carlos Alcaraz (fourth round)
6. (Canada) Félix Auger-Aliassime (first round)
7. (Poland) Hubert Hurkacz (first round)
8. (Italy) Matteo Berrettini (withdrew due to positive COVID-19 test)
9. (United Kingdom) Cameron Norrie (semi-finals)
10. (Italy) Jannik Sinner (quarter-finals)
11. (United States) Taylor Fritz (quarter-finals)
12. (Argentina) Diego Schwartzman (second round)
13. (Canada) Denis Shapovalov (second round)
14. (Croatia) Marin Čilić (withdrew due to positive COVID-19 test)
15. (United States) Reilly Opelka (second round)
16. (Spain) Pablo Carreño Busta (first round, retired)

17. (Spain) Roberto Bautista Agut (second round, withdrew due to positive COVID-19 test)
18. (Bulgaria) Grigor Dimitrov (first round, retired)
19. (Australia) Alex de Minaur (fourth round)
20. (United States) John Isner (third round)
21. (Netherlands) Botic van de Zandschulp (fourth round)
22. (Georgia (country)) Nikoloz Basilashvili (third round)
23. (United States) Frances Tiafoe (fourth round)
24. (Denmark) Holger Rune (first round)
25. (Serbia) Miomir Kecmanović (third round)
26. (Serbia) Filip Krajinović (second round)
27. (Italy) Lorenzo Sonego (third round)
28. (United Kingdom) Dan Evans (first round)
29. (United States) Jenson Brooksby (third round)
30. (United States) Tommy Paul (fourth round)
31. (Argentina) Sebastián Báez (second round)
32. (Germany) Oscar Otte (third round)

Click on the seed number of a player to go to their draw section.

== Draw ==
Key

- Q = Qualifier
- WC = Wild card
- LL = Lucky loser
- Alt = Alternate
- ITF = ITF entry
- PR = Protected ranking
- SR = Special ranking
- SE = Special exempt
- JE = Junior exempt
- JR = Junior Accelerator Programme entrant
- CO = College Accelerator Programme entrant
- NG = Next Gen Accelerator Program entrant
- w/o = Walkover
- r = Retired
- d = Defaulted

=== Finals ===
Quarter-finals
1	(Serbia) Novak Djokovic	5	2	6	6	6
10	(Italy) Jannik Sinner	7	6	3	2	2
(Belgium) David Goffin	6	5	6	3	5
9	(United Kingdom) Cameron Norrie	3	7	2	6	7
(Chile) Cristian Garín	4	3	6^{5}
(Australia) Nick Kyrgios	6	6	7^{7}
11	(United States) Taylor Fritz	6	5	6	5	6^{4}
2	(Spain) Rafael Nadal	3	7	3	7	7^{10}

Semi-finals
1	(Serbia) Novak Djokovic	2	6	6	6
9	(United Kingdom) Cameron Norrie	6	3	2	4
(Australia) Nick Kyrgios	w/o
2	(Spain) Rafael Nadal

Final
1	(Serbia) Novak Djokovic	4	6	6	7^{7}
(Australia) Nick Kyrgios	6	3	4	6^{3}

=== Top half ===
==== Section 1 ====
First round
1	(Serbia) N Djokovic	6	3	6	6
(South Korea) S-w Kwon	3	6	3	4
(Australia) T Kokkinakis	7^{7}	6	7
(Poland) K Majchrzak	6^{5}	2	5
(Chile) A Tabilo	7^{8}	6	1	4	7^{13}
(Serbia) L Djere	6^{6}	2	6	6	6^{11}
(Australia) J Millman	3	6	3	4
25	(Serbia) M Kecmanović	6	2	6	6
22	(Georgia (country)) N Basilashvili	6^{4}	7^{8}	3	6	6
Q	(Czech Republic) L Rosol	7^{7}	6^{6}	6	3	3
(France) B Paire	6	1	2	4
(France) Q Halys	4	6	6	6
WC	(Netherlands) T van Rijthoven	7^{9}	6	6
(Argentina) F Delbonis	6^{7}	1	2
(Spain) C Taberner	6^{5}	4	4
15	(United States) R Opelka	7^{7}	6	6

Second round
1	(Serbia) N Djokovic	6	6	6
(Australia) T Kokkinakis	1	4	2
(Chile) A Tabilo	6^{4}	6^{3}	6	3
25	(Serbia) M Kecmanović	7^{7}	7^{7}	3	6
22	(Georgia (country)) N Basilashvili	7^{9}	0	7	7^{7}
(France) Q Halys	6^{7}	6	5	6^{5}
WC	(Netherlands) T van Rijthoven	6	6^{8}	7^{9}	7^{7}
15	(United States) R Opelka	4	7^{10}	6^{7}	6^{4}

Third round
1	(Serbia) N Djokovic	6	6	6
25	(Serbia) M Kecmanović	0	3	4
22	(Georgia (country)) N Basilashvili	4	3	4
WC	(Netherlands) T van Rijthoven	6	6	6

Fourth round
1	(Serbia) N Djokovic	6	4	6	6
WC	(Netherlands) T van Rijthoven	2	6	1	2

==== Section 2 ====
First round
10	(Italy) J Sinner	7	4	6	6
WC	(Switzerland) S Wawrinka	5	6	3	2
(Germany) D Altmaier	3	5	5
(Sweden) M Ymer	6	7	7
(United Kingdom) A Murray	4	6	6	6
(Australia) J Duckworth	6	3	2	4
Q	(France) E Couacaud	7^{8}	6^{3}	6	3	5
20	(United States) J Isner	6^{6}	7^{7}	4	6	7
32	(Germany) O Otte	6	6	6
(Germany) P Gojowczyk	1	2	1
WC	(United Kingdom) J Clarke	6^{3}	1	6^{6}
Q	(United States) C Harrison	7^{7}	6	7^{8}
(Netherlands) T Griekspoor	5	7	6	6
(Italy) F Fognini	7	5	3	4
(Germany) J-L Struff	6	5	6	6^{3}	4
5	(Spain) C Alcaraz	4	7	4	7^{7}	6

Second round
10	(Italy) J Sinner	6	6	5	6
(Sweden) M Ymer	4	3	7	2
(United Kingdom) A Murray	4	6^{4}	7^{7}	4
20	(United States) J Isner	6	7^{7}	6^{3}	6
32	(Germany) O Otte	3
Q	(United States) C Harrison	1^{r}
(Netherlands) T Griekspoor	4	6^{0}	3
5	(Spain) C Alcaraz	6	7^{7}	6

Third round
10	(Italy) J Sinner	6	7^{7}	6
20	(United States) J Isner	4	6^{4}	3
32	(Germany) O Otte	3	1	2
5	(Spain) C Alcaraz	6	6	6

Fourth round
10	(Italy) J Sinner	6	6	6^{8}	6
5	(Spain) C Alcaraz	1	4	7^{10}	3

==== Section 3 ====
First round
3	(Norway) C Ruud	7^{7}	7^{11}	6
(Spain) A Ramos Viñolas	6^{1}	6^{9}	2
(Argentina) TM Etcheverry	3	6	6	3	4
(France) U Humbert	6	3	4	6	6
(Belgium) D Goffin	6	6	7^{7}
Q	(Moldova) R Albot	2	2	6^{5}
(Japan) T Daniel	4	4	5
31	(Argentina) S Báez	6	6	7
23	(United States) F Tiafoe	6	6	6
Q	(Italy) A Vavassori	4	4	4
Q	(Germany) M Marterer	4	7	6	7
PR	(Slovenia) A Bedene	6	5	4	5
(Kazakhstan) A Bublik	6	6	6
(Hungary) M Fucsovics	1	2	4
(Serbia) D Lajović	3	6	0
16	(Spain) P Carreño Busta	6	4	0^{r}

Second round
3	(Norway) C Ruud	6	2	5	4
(France) U Humbert	3	6	7	6
(Belgium) D Goffin	6	6	6
31	(Argentina) S Báez	1	2	4
23	(United States) F Tiafoe	6	6	7^{7}
Q	(Germany) M Marterer	2	2	6^{3}
(Kazakhstan) A Bublik	7^{9}	6	7
(Serbia) D Lajović	6^{7}	2	5

Third round
(France) U Humbert	6	5	2	5
(Belgium) D Goffin	4	7	6	7
23	(United States) F Tiafoe	3	7^{7}	7^{7}	6
(Kazakhstan) A Bublik	6	6^{1}	6^{3}	4

Fourth round
(Belgium) D Goffin	7^{7}	5	5	6	7
23	(United States) F Tiafoe	6^{3}	7	7	4	5

==== Section 4 ====
First round
9	(United Kingdom) C Norrie	6	7^{7}	6
(Spain) P Andújar	0	6^{3}	3
(Brazil) T Monteiro	2	4	5
(Spain) J Munar	6	6	7
WC	(United Kingdom) R Peniston	6	6	6
(Switzerland) H Laaksonen	4	3	2
(United States) S Johnson	4	5
18	(Bulgaria) G Dimitrov	6	2^{r}
30	(United States) T Paul	6	6	7^{7}
(Spain) F Verdasco	1	2	6^{4}
(France) A Mannarino	6	7^{7}	4	4	6
Q	(Australia) M Purcell	3	6^{0}	6	6	4
(Argentina) F Coria	3	2	6^{3}
(Czech Republic) J Veselý	6	6	7^{7}
(Spain) A Davidovich Fokina	7^{7}	6	5	2	7^{10}
7	(Poland) H Hurkacz	6^{4}	4	7	6	6^{8}

Second round
9	(United Kingdom) C Norrie	6	3	5	6	6
(Spain) J Munar	4	6	7	0	2
WC	(United Kingdom) R Peniston	3	2	4
(United States) S Johnson	6	6	6
30	(United States) T Paul	6	6	6
(France) A Mannarino	2	4	1
(Czech Republic) J Veselý	6	5	6^{2}	6	7^{10}
(Spain) A Davidovich Fokina	3	7	7^{7}	3	6^{7}

Third round
9	(United Kingdom) C Norrie	6	6	6
(United States) S Johnson	4	1	0
30	(United States) T Paul	6	6	6
(Czech Republic) J Veselý	3	2	2

Fourth round
9	(United Kingdom) C Norrie	6	7	6
30	(United States) T Paul	4	5	4

=== Bottom half ===
==== Section 5 ====
First round
LL	(Sweden) E Ymer	3	5	4
(Chile) C Garín	6	7	6
Q	(Switzerland) M-A Hüsler	3	6^{0}	7^{7}	6	4
LL	(France) H Grenier	6	7^{7}	6^{5}	2	6
LL	(Czech Republic) Z Kolář	3	3	1
(France) B Bonzi	6	6	6
Q	(Kazakhstan) M Kukushkin	3	2	3
29	(United States) J Brooksby	6	6	6
19	(Australia) A de Minaur	6	6	7
(Bolivia) H Dellien	1	3	5
WC	(Belgium) Z Bergs	4	4	6^{4}
(United Kingdom) J Draper	6	6	7^{7}
WC	(United Kingdom) L Broady	4	6	7	6^{2}	6
Q	(Slovakia) L Klein	6	3	5	7^{7}	3
LL	(United States) S Kozlov	3	2	2
12	(Argentina) D Schwartzman	6	6	6

Second round
(Chile) C Garín	6	6	6
LL	(France) H Grenier	3	1	1
(France) B Bonzi	6^{3}	5	3
29	(United States) J Brooksby	7^{7}	7	6
19	(Australia) A de Minaur	5	7^{7}	6	6
(United Kingdom) J Draper	7	6^{0}	2	3
WC	(United Kingdom) L Broady	6	4	0	7^{8}	6
12	(Argentina) D Schwartzman	2	6	6	6^{6}	1

Third round
(Chile) C Garín	6	6	1	6
29	(United States) J Brooksby	2	3	6	4
19	(Australia) A de Minaur	6	6	7
WC	(United Kingdom) L Broady	3	4	5

Fourth round
(Chile) C Garín	2	5	7^{7}	6	7^{10}
19	(Australia) A de Minaur	6	7	6^{3}	4	6^{6}

==== Section 6 ====
First round
13	(Canada) D Shapovalov	6	6^{6}	6^{4}	6	6
(France) A Rinderknech	1	7^{8}	7^{7}	4	1
(United States) B Nakashima	6	6^{1}	6	6
Q	(Germany) N Kuhn	3	7^{7}	3	2
(Colombia) DE Galán	6	7	7^{7}
(Germany) D Koepfer	4	5	6^{1}
PR	(Hungary) A Balázs	1	0	3
17	(Spain) R Bautista Agut	6	6	6
26	(Serbia) F Krajinović	5	6	6^{5}	7^{7}	6
(Czech Republic) J Lehečka	7	4	7^{7}	6^{5}	4
WC	(United Kingdom) P Jubb	6	1	5	7^{7}	5
(Australia) N Kyrgios	3	6	7	6^{3}	7
(Spain) R Carballés Baena	4	1	1
(Australia) J Thompson	6	6	6
Q	(Switzerland) A Ritschard	6^{1}	3	7	4
4	(Greece) S Tsitsipas	7^{7}	6	5	6

Second round
13	(Canada) D Shapovalov	2	6	1	6^{6}
(United States) B Nakashima	6	4	6	7^{8}
(Colombia) DE Galán	w/o
17	(Spain) R Bautista Agut
26	(Serbia) F Krajinović	2	3	1
(Australia) N Kyrgios	6	6	6
(Australia) J Thompson	2	3	5
4	(Greece) S Tsitsipas	6	6	7

Third round
(United States) B Nakashima	6	6	6
(Colombia) DE Galán	4	4	1
(Australia) N Kyrgios	6^{2}	6	6	7^{9}
4	(Greece) S Tsitsipas	7^{7}	4	3	6^{7}

Fourth round
(United States) B Nakashima	6	4	6^{2}	6	2
(Australia) N Kyrgios	4	6	7^{7}	3	6

==== Section 7 ====
First round
6	(Canada) F Auger-Aliassime	7^{7}	4	6^{9}	6^{5}
(United States) M Cressy	6^{5}	6	7^{11}	7^{7}
Q	(Spain) B Zapata Miralles	6^{6}	4	4
Q	(United States) J Sock	7^{8}	6	6
Q	(Austria) D Novak	7^{9}	2	6	6
(Argentina) F Bagnis	6^{7}	6	4	3
Q	(Australia) J Kubler	6	6	6
28	(United Kingdom) D Evans	1	4	3
24	(Denmark) H Rune	3	5	4
(United States) M Giron	6	7	6
(Spain) P Martínez	6	4	4	1
(Slovakia) A Molčan	4	6	6	6
WC	(United Kingdom) A Gray	6	6	7^{7}
(Chinese Taipei) C-h Tseng	3	3	6^{3}
(Italy) L Musetti	4	4	3
11	(United States) T Fritz	6	6	6

Second round
(United States) M Cressy	4	4	6	6^{1}
Q	(United States) J Sock	6	6	3	7^{7}
Q	(Austria) D Novak	3	4	4
Q	(Australia) J Kubler	6	6	6
(United States) M Giron	3	2	4
(Slovakia) A Molčan	6	6	6
WC	(United Kingdom) A Gray	3	6^{3}	3
11	(United States) T Fritz	6	7^{7}	6

Third round
Q	(United States) J Sock	2	6	7	6^{4}	3
Q	(Australia) J Kubler	6	4	5	7^{7}	6
(Slovakia) A Molčan	4	1	6^{3}
11	(United States) T Fritz	6	6	7^{7}

Fourth round
Q	(Australia) J Kubler	3	1	4
11	(United States) T Fritz	6	6	6

==== Section 8 ====
First round
LL	(Portugal) N Borges	4	4	6^{3}
(United States) M McDonald	6	6	7^{7}
(Portugal) J Sousa	6^{7}	2	6	6	3
(France) R Gasquet	7^{9}	6	4	4	6
(Finland) E Ruusuvuori	6	6	4	6
(Japan) Y Nishioka	2	2	6	4
(Spain) F López	2	3	3
21	(Netherlands) B van de Zandschulp	6	6	6
27	(Italy) L Sonego	6^{6}	6	7	4	6
(United States) D Kudla	7^{8}	3	5	6	2
(Australia) A Popyrin	2	6	6	6^{3}	3
(France) H Gaston	6	4	0	7^{7}	6
(United States) S Querrey	4	5	3
(Lithuania) R Berankis	6	7	6
(Argentina) F Cerúndolo	4	3	6	4
2	(Spain) R Nadal	6	6	3	6

Second round
(United States) M McDonald	3	6	4	3
(France) R Gasquet	6	3	6	6
(Finland) E Ruusuvuori	6	1	4	4
21	(Netherlands) B van de Zandschulp	3	6	6	6
27	(Italy) L Sonego	7^{7}	6	6
(France) H Gaston	6^{4}	4	4
(Lithuania) R Berankis	4	4	6	3
2	(Spain) R Nadal	6	6	4	6

Third round
(France) R Gasquet	5	6	6^{7}	1
21	(Netherlands) B van de Zandschulp	7	2	7^{9}	6
27	(Italy) L Sonego	1	2	4
2	(Spain) R Nadal	6	6	6

Fourth round
21	(Netherlands) B van de Zandschulp	4	2	6^{6}
2	(Spain) R Nadal	6	6	7^{8}

== Seeded players ==
The following are the seeded players. Seedings are based on ATP rankings as of 20 June 2022. Rankings and points are as before 27 June 2022.

As a result of special ranking adjustment rules due to the COVID-19 pandemic, players are defending the higher of (i) their points from the 2021 tournament or (ii) the remaining 50% of their points from the 2019 tournament. Those points were not mandatory and are included in the table below only if they counted towards the player's ranking as of 27 June 2022. Note that this is a different rankings adjustment system than the one that the WTA is using for the women's tournament.

The ATP is removing ranking points from the 2022 tournament as a result of the All England Club's decision to ban Russian and Belarusian players from the tournament. Points dropping from the 2021 or 2019 tournaments will accordingly be replaced by the player's next best result, regardless of his performance at Wimbledon in 2022.

Seed	Rank	Player	Points before	Points defending (2021 or 2019)^{†}	Next best result^{‡}	Points after	Status
1	3	(Serbia) Novak Djokovic	6,770	2,000	0	4,770	Champion, defeated (Australia) Nick Kyrgios
2	4	(Spain) Rafael Nadal	6,525	360	0	6,165	Semi-finals, withdrew due to an abdominal tear
3	6	(Norway) Casper Ruud	5,050	—^{§}	—	5,050	Second round lost to (France) Ugo Humbert
4	5	(Greece) Stefanos Tsitsipas	5,150	—^{§}	—	5,150	Third round lost to (Australia) Nick Kyrgios
5	7	(Spain) Carlos Alcaraz	4,890	45	0	4,845	Fourth round lost to (Italy) Jannik Sinner [10]
6	9	(Canada) Félix Auger-Aliassime	3,760	360	45	3,445	First round lost to (United States) Maxime Cressy
7	10	(Poland) Hubert Hurkacz	3,735	720	10	3,025	First round lost to (Spain) Alejandro Davidovich Fokina
~~8~~	~~11~~	(Italy) ~~Matteo Berrettini~~	3,480	1,200	0	2,280	Withdrew due to positive test for COVID-19
9	12	(United Kingdom) Cameron Norrie	3,200	90	45	3,155	Semi-finals lost to (Serbia) Novak Djokovic [1]
10	13	(Italy) Jannik Sinner	3,185	—^{§}	—	3,185	Quarter-finals lost to (Serbia) Novak Djokovic [1]
11	14	(United States) Taylor Fritz	3,045	90	20	2,975	Quarter-finals lost to (Spain) Rafael Nadal [2]
12	15	(Argentina) Diego Schwartzman	2,325	—^{§}	—	2,325	Second round lost to (United Kingdom) Liam Broady (WC)
13	16	(Canada) Denis Shapovalov	2,293	720	0	1,573	Second round lost to (United States) Brandon Nakashima
~~14~~	~~17~~	(Croatia) ~~Marin Čilić~~	2,220	90	0	2,130	Withdrew due to positive test for COVID-19
15	18	(United States) Reilly Opelka	2,100	45	0	2,055	Second round lost to (Netherlands) Tim van Rijthoven (WC)
16	20	(Spain) Pablo Carreño Busta	1,930	10	6	1,926	First round retired against (Serbia) Dušan Lajović
17	19	(Spain) Roberto Bautista Agut	2,008	360	10	1,658	Second round withdrew due to positive test for COVID-19
18	21	(Bulgaria) Grigor Dimitrov	1,785	45	0	1,740	First round retired against (United States) Steve Johnson
19	27	(Australia) Alex de Minaur	1,473	23	10	1,460	Fourth round lost to (Chile) Cristian Garín
20	24	(United States) John Isner	1,616	23	0	1,593	Third round lost to (Italy) Jannik Sinner [10]
21	25	(Netherlands) Botic van de Zandschulp	1,518	61	26	1,483	Fourth round lost to (Spain) Rafael Nadal [2]
22	26	(Georgia (country)) Nikoloz Basilashvili	1,473	23	10	1,460	Third round lost to (Netherlands) Tim van Rijthoven (WC)
23	28	(United States) Frances Tiafoe	1,439	90	0	1,349	Fourth round lost to (Belgium) David Goffin
24	29	(Denmark) Holger Rune	1,420	—^{§}	—	1,420	First round lost to (United States) Marcos Giron
25	30	(Serbia) Miomir Kecmanović	1,306	45	10	1,271	Third round lost to (Serbia) Novak Djokovic [1]
26	31	(Serbia) Filip Krajinović	1,300	—^{§}	—	1,300	Second round lost to (Australia) Nick Kyrgios
27	54	(Italy) Lorenzo Sonego	980	180	10	810	Third round lost to (Spain) Rafael Nadal [2]
28	33	(United Kingdom) Dan Evans	1,198	90	20	1,128	First round lost to (Australia) Jason Kubler (Q)
29	34	(United States) Jenson Brooksby	1,187	—^{§}	—	1,187	Third round lost to (Chile) Cristian Garín
30	32	(United States) Tommy Paul	1,208	—^{§}	—	1,208	Fourth round lost to (United Kingdom) Cameron Norrie [9]
31	35	(Argentina) Sebastián Báez	1,168	—^{§}	—	1,168	Second round lost to (Belgium) David Goffin
32	36	(Germany) Oscar Otte	1,155	70	12	1,097	Third round lost to (Spain) Carlos Alcaraz [5]

† This column shows the higher of the player's points from the 2021 tournament or 50% of his points from the 2019 tournament. Only ranking points counting towards the player's ranking as of 27 June 2022 are reflected in the column.
‡ Because the ATP is removing ranking points from the 2022 tournament, 2021 or 2019 points will be replaced by the player's next best result instead.
§ The player had no points from either the 2021 or 2019 tournaments counting towards his ranking on 27 June 2022. Accordingly, no points will be replaced.

=== Withdrawn players ===
The following players would have been seeded, but withdrew before the tournament began.

Rank	Player	Points before	Points defending	Next best result	Points after	Withdrawal reason
2	(Germany) Alexander Zverev	7,030	180	0	6,850	Right ankle injury
23	(France) Gaël Monfils	1,660	45	0	1,615	Right foot injury

=== Banned players ===
The following players would have been seeded, but were not permitted to enter the tournament due to the decision to ban players from Russia and Belarus.

Rank	Player	Points before	Points defending	Next best result	Points after
1	(Russia) Daniil Medvedev	7,955	180	0	7,775
8	(Russia) Andrey Rublev	3,870	180	10	3,700
22	(Russia) Karen Khachanov	1,755	360	45	1,440

== Other entry information ==
=== Wild cards ===
- (Belgium) Zizou Bergs
- (United Kingdom) Liam Broady
- (United Kingdom) Jay Clarke
- (United Kingdom) Alastair Gray
- (United Kingdom) Paul Jubb
- (United Kingdom) Ryan Peniston
- (Netherlands) Tim van Rijthoven
- (Switzerland) Stan Wawrinka

=== Protected ranking ===
- (Croatia) ~~Borna Ćorić (27)~~
- (Slovenia) Aljaž Bedene (75)
- (Hungary) Attila Balázs (101)

=== Qualifiers ===
- (Moldova) Radu Albot
- (France) Enzo Couacaud
- (United States) Christian Harrison
- (Switzerland) Marc-Andrea Hüsler
- (Slovakia) Lukáš Klein
- (Australia) Jason Kubler
- (Germany) Nicola Kuhn
- (Kazakhstan) Mikhail Kukushkin
- (Germany) Maximilian Marterer
- (Austria) Dennis Novak
- (Australia) Max Purcell
- (Switzerland) Alexander Ritschard
- (Czech Republic) Lukáš Rosol
- (United States) Jack Sock
- (Italy) Andrea Vavassori
- (Spain) Bernabé Zapata Miralles

=== Lucky losers ===
- (Portugal) Nuno Borges
- (France) Hugo Grenier
- (Czech Republic) Zdeněk Kolář
- (United States) Stefan Kozlov
- (Sweden) Elias Ymer

=== Withdrawals ===
==== Banned list ====
The All England Lawn Tennis and Croquet Club declined entries from Russian and Belarusian players to 2022 Wimbledon Championships, stating that "in the circumstances of such unjustified and unprecedented military aggression, it would be unacceptable for the Russian regime to derive any benefits from the involvement of Russian or Belarusian players with The Championships".

- (Russia) Daniil Medvedev (2) → replaced by (Japan) Taro Daniel (105)
- (Russia) Andrey Rublev (7) → replaced by (United Kingdom) Jack Draper (106)
- (Russia) Karen Khachanov (24) → replaced by (United States) Sam Querrey (107)
- (Russia) Aslan Karatsev (39) → replaced by (Colombia) Daniel Elahi Galán (108)
- (Belarus) Ilya Ivashka (50) → replaced by (Spain) Fernando Verdasco (109)

==== On entry list ====
The entry list was released based on the ATP rankings for the week of 16 May 2022.

- ‡ (South Africa) Lloyd Harris (37) → replaced by (Australia) Alexei Popyrin (103)
- ‡ (Germany) Alexander Zverev (3) → replaced by (Chinese Taipei) Tseng Chun-hsin (110)
- ‡ (Austria) Dominic Thiem (6 PR) → replaced by (Spain) Feliciano López (111) (Note: Last direct acceptance)
- † (United States) Sebastian Korda (30) → replaced by (Czech Republic) Zdeněk Kolář (LL)
- † (France) Gaël Monfils (22) → replaced by (France) Hugo Grenier (LL)
- § (Croatia) Borna Ćorić (27 PR) → replaced by (United States) Stefan Kozlov (LL)
- § (Croatia) Marin Čilić (23) → replaced by (Portugal) Nuno Borges (LL)
- § (Italy) Matteo Berrettini (10) → replaced by (Sweden) Elias Ymer (LL)

‡ – withdrew from entry list before qualifying draw
† – withdrew from entry list after qualifying draw
§ – withdrew from main draw

== Explanatory notes ==
Preceded by 2022 French Open – Men's singles	Grand Slam men's singles	Succeeded by 2022 US Open – Men's singles
