= 2022 Libéma Open – Women's doubles =

Women's doubles
- 2022 Libéma Open

Final
- Champions: (Australia) Ellen Perez (Slovenia) Tamara Zidanšek
- Runners-up: Veronika Kudermetova (Belgium) Elise Mertens
- Score: 6–3, 5–7, [12–10]

Details
- Draw: 16
- Seeds: 4

Events
Singles	men	women
Doubles	men	women
← 2019 ·	Libéma Open	· 2023 →

Ellen Perez and Tamara Zidanšek defeated Veronika Kudermetova and Elise Mertens in the final, 6–3, 5–7, [12–10] to win the women's doubles tennis title at the 2022 Rosmalen Grass Court Championships. They saved a championship point en route to the title.

Shuko Aoyama and Aleksandra Krunić were the reigning champions from when the tournament was last held in 2019, but neither returned to participate after Krunić chose not to compete and Aoyama played in Nottingham instead.

== Seeds ==
1. Veronika Kudermetova / (Belgium) Elise Mertens (final)
2. (United States) Desirae Krawczyk / (Netherlands) Demi Schuurs (semifinals, retired)
3. (United States) Kaitlyn Christian / (Mexico) Giuliana Olmos (first round)
4. (Japan) Eri Hozumi / (Japan) Makoto Ninomiya (semifinals)

== Draw ==
=== Key ===
- Q = Qualifier
- WC = Wild card
- LL = Lucky loser
- Alt = Alternate
- ITF = ITF entry
- PR = Protected ranking
- SR = Special ranking
- SE = Special exempt
- JE = Junior exempt
- JR = Junior Accelerator Programme entrant
- CO = College Accelerator Programme entrant
- NG = Next Gen Accelerator Program entrant
- w/o = Walkover
- r = Retired
- d = Defaulted

=== Draw ===
First round
1	V Kudermetova (Belgium) E Mertens	6	6
(Germany) J Lohoff (Czech Republic) R Voráčová	2	4
(Poland) K Piter (Belgium) K Zimmermann	7	6
(Slovakia) T Mihalíková (Belgium) G Minnen	5	2
4	(Japan) E Hozumi (Japan) M Ninomiya	6	6
(Switzerland) B Bencic (Ukraine) A Kalinina	3	4
(Belgium) K Flipkens (Belgium) A Van Uytvanck	4	5
(Chile) A Guarachi (United States) S Rogers	6	7
(Kazakhstan) E Rybakina; L Samsonova	6	6^{6}	[0]^{r}
(Australia) E Perez (Slovenia) T Zidanšek	1	7^{8}	[0]
WC	(Netherlands) I Haverlag (Netherlands) S Lamens	7	6
3	(United States) K Christian (Mexico) G Olmos	5	3
PR	(Poland) P Kania-Choduń (France) E Lechemia	4	6^{1}
A Kalinskaya (United States) C McNally	6	7^{7}
WC	(Netherlands) L Pattinama Kerkhove (Belgium) Y Wickmayer	1	3
2	(United States) D Krawczyk (Netherlands) D Schuurs	6	6

Quarterfinals
1	V Kudermetova (Belgium) E Mertens	6	6
(Poland) K Piter (Belgium) K Zimmermann	1	1
4	(Japan) E Hozumi (Japan) M Ninomiya	6	6
(Chile) A Guarachi (United States) S Rogers	2	2
(Australia) E Perez (Slovenia) T Zidanšek	6	7
WC	(Netherlands) I Haverlag (Netherlands) S Lamens	0	5
A Kalinskaya (United States) C McNally
2	(United States) D Krawczyk (Netherlands) D Schuurs	w/o

Semifinals
1	V Kudermetova (Belgium) E Mertens	6	6
4	(Japan) E Hozumi (Japan) M Ninomiya	4	2
(Australia) E Perez (Slovenia) T Zidanšek	4
2	(United States) D Krawczyk (Netherlands) D Schuurs	1^{r}

Final
1	V Kudermetova (Belgium) E Mertens	3	7	[10]
(Australia) E Perez (Slovenia) T Zidanšek	6	5	[12]
