= 2022 Libéma Open – Men's singles =

Men's singles
- 2022 Libéma Open

Final
- Champion: (Netherlands) Tim van Rijthoven
- Runner-up: Daniil Medvedev
- Score: 6–4, 6–1

Details
- Draw: 28 (4 Q / 3 WC )
- Seeds: 8

Events
Singles	men	women
Doubles	men	women
- Libéma Open

Tim van Rijthoven defeated Daniil Medvedev in the final, 6–4, 6–1 to win the men's singles tennis title at the 2022 Rosmalen Grass Court Championships. It was his first and only ATP Tour title, and his maiden ATP Tour title as well, he became the first Dutchman to win an ATP Tour singles title since Robin Haase in 2012. Van Rijthoven entered the tournament as a wildcard, and he won the title by earning his first five ATP Tour wins at the tournament.

Adrian Mannarino was the defending champion from when the event was last held in 2019, but he lost in the semifinals to Medvedev.

== Seeds ==
The top four seeds receive a bye into the second round.

1. Daniil Medvedev (final)
2. (Canada) Félix Auger-Aliassime (semifinals)
3. (United States) Taylor Fritz (second round)
4. (Australia) Alex de Minaur (second round)
5. Karen Khachanov (quarterfinals)
6. (Netherlands) Botic van de Zandschulp (first round)
7. (United States) Tommy Paul (first round)
8. (United States) Jenson Brooksby (second round)

== Draw ==
Key

- Q = Qualifier
- WC = Wild card
- LL = Lucky loser
- Alt = Alternate
- ITF = ITF entry
- PR = Protected ranking
- SR = Special ranking
- SE = Special exempt
- JE = Junior exempt
- JR = Junior Accelerator Programme entrant
- CO = College Accelerator Programme entrant
- NG = Next Gen Accelerator Program entrant
- w/o = Walkover
- r = Retired
- d = Defaulted

=== Finals ===
Semifinals
1	Daniil Medvedev	7	7
(France) Adrian Mannarino	5	5
WC	(Netherlands) Tim van Rijthoven	6	1	7^{7}
2	(Canada) Félix Auger-Aliassime	3	6	6^{5}

Final
1	Daniil Medvedev	4	1
WC	(Netherlands) Tim van Rijthoven	6	6

=== Top half ===
First round
(Australia) J Duckworth	4	6^{9}
Q	(France) G Simon	6	7^{11}
I Ivashka	6	6^{8}	6
(United States) M McDonald	3	7^{10}	1
(Finland) E Ruusuvuori	4	6	6
6	(Netherlands) B van de Zandschulp	6	2	1
(France) A Mannarino	7^{7}	7^{11}
Q	(Italy) A Seppi	6^{4}	6^{9}
Q	(United States) S Querrey	6	6
WC	(Netherlands) R Haase	3	2
(United States) B Nakashima	6^{4}	7^{7}	7^{7}
7	(United States) T Paul	7^{7}	6^{5}	6^{2}

Second round
1	D Medvedev	7	6
Q	(France) G Simon	5	4
I Ivashka	6	6
(Finland) E Ruusuvuori	4	2
4	(Australia) A de Minaur	2	3
(France) A Mannarino	6	6
Q	(United States) S Querrey	6^{4}	6^{6}
(United States) B Nakashima	7^{7}	7^{8}

Quarterfinals
1	D Medvedev	7^{10}	6
I Ivashka	6^{8}	4
(France) A Mannarino	6^{5}	6	6
(United States) B Nakashima	7^{7}	1	4

Semifinals
1	D Medvedev	7	7
(France) A Mannarino	5	5

=== Bottom half ===
First round
8	(United States) J Brooksby	7^{7}	6
WC	(Netherlands) J de Jong	6^{3}	3
(France) H Gaston	6	6
(South Korea) S-w Kwon	2	1
Q	(Australia) M Ebden	6^{4}	6^{9}
WC	(Netherlands) T van Rijthoven	7^{7}	7^{11}
5	K Khachanov	6	6
(Chile) A Tabilo	3	3
(Germany) D Koepfer	1	4
(Poland) K Majchrzak	6	6
(Netherlands) T Griekspoor	7	7
PR	(Slovenia) A Bedene	5	5

Second round
8	(United States) J Brooksby	6	3	5
(France) H Gaston	3	6	7
WC	(Netherlands) T van Rijthoven	6^{9}	7	6
3	(United States) T Fritz	7^{11}	5	4
5	K Khachanov	5	7	7^{7}
(Poland) K Majchrzak	7	5	6^{5}
(Netherlands) T Griekspoor	6^{2}	6^{5}
2	(Canada) F Auger-Aliassime	7^{7}	7^{7}

Quarterfinals
(France) H Gaston	6^{2}	4
WC	(Netherlands) T van Rijthoven	7^{7}	6
5	K Khachanov	6^{5}	4
2	(Canada) F Auger-Aliassime	7^{7}	6

Semifinals
WC	(Netherlands) T van Rijthoven	6	1	7^{7}
2	(Canada) F Auger-Aliassime	3	6	6^{5}

== Qualifying ==
=== Seeds ===
1. (United States) Sam Querrey (qualified)
2. (United States) Stefan Kozlov (first round)
3. (Italy) Andreas Seppi (qualified)
4. (France) Gilles Simon (qualified)
5. (Australia) Max Purcell (first round)
6. (France) Pierre-Hugues Herbert (qualifying competition)
7. (Belgium) Zizou Bergs (qualifying competition)
8. (Netherlands) Gijs Brouwer (qualifying competition)

=== Qualifiers ===
1. (United States) Sam Querrey
2. (Australia) Matthew Ebden
3. (Italy) Andreas Seppi
4. (France) Gilles Simon

=== Draw ===
==== First qualifier ====
First round
1	(United States) Sam Querrey	6	6
WC	(Australia) Bernard Tomic	4	4
Alt	(France) Matteo Martineau	3	4
6	(France) Pierre-Hugues Herbert	6	6

Qualifying competition
1	(United States) Sam Querrey	6^{4}	6	6
6	(France) Pierre-Hugues Herbert	7^{7}	4	3

==== Second qualifier ====
First round
2	(United States) Stefan Kozlov	4	4
(Australia) Matthew Ebden	6	6
(Sweden) Dragoș Nicolae Mădăraș	6	5	1
7	(Belgium) Zizou Bergs	3	7	6

Qualifying competition
(Australia) Matthew Ebden	6	6
7	(Belgium) Zizou Bergs	3	2

==== Third qualifier ====
First round
3	(Italy) Andreas Seppi	7^{7}	6
PR	(United States) Bradley Klahn	6^{4}	1
(Japan) Yūichi Sugita	4	2
8/WC	(Netherlands) Gijs Brouwer	6	6

Qualifying competition
3	(Italy) Andreas Seppi	7	6^{5}	6
8/WC	(Netherlands) Gijs Brouwer	5	7^{7}	3

==== Fourth qualifier ====
First round
4	(France) Gilles Simon	6	3	6
(Portugal) Gonçalo Oliveira	3	6	2
(Germany) Julian Lenz	6	6
5	(Australia) Max Purcell	4	4

Qualifying competition
4	(France) Gilles Simon	4	6	6
(Germany) Julian Lenz	6	3	2
