= 2022 Open de Rennes =

- Date: 12–18 September
- Edition: 16th
- Surface: Hard (Indoor)
- Location: Rennes, France

Champions

Singles
- (France) Ugo Humbert

Doubles
- (France) Jonathan Eysseric / (Netherlands) David Pel
← 2021 ·	Open de Rennes	· 2023 →

The 2022 Open Blot Rennes was a professional tennis tournament played on hard courts. It was the sixteenth edition of the tournament and part of the 2022 ATP Challenger Tour. It took place in Rennes, France between 12 and 18 September 2022.

== Singles main-draw entrants ==
=== Seeds ===
Country	Player	Rank^{1}	Seed
FRA	Hugo Gaston	72	1
GER	Peter Gojowczyk	108	2
FRA	Hugo Grenier	119	3
FRA	Ugo Humbert	138	4
GBR	Ryan Peniston	140	5
FRA	Grégoire Barrère	163	6
FRA	Benoît Paire	173	7
NED	Gijs Brouwer	181	8

- ^{1} Rankings are as of 29 August 2022.

=== Other entrants ===
The following players received wildcards into the singles main draw:

- (France) Clément Chidekh
- (France) Gabriel Debru
- (Austria) Dominic Thiem

The following players received entry from the qualifying draw:

- (Sweden) Filip Bergevi
- (Sweden) Karl Friberg
- (Belgium) Yannick Mertens
- (France) Maxime Mora
- (Germany) Max Hans Rehberg
- (Germany) Marko Topo

== Champions ==
=== Singles ===
- (France) Ugo Humbert def. (Austria) Dominic Thiem 6–3, 6–0.

=== Doubles ===
- (France) Jonathan Eysseric / (Netherlands) David Pel def. (France) Dan Added / (France) Albano Olivetti 6–4, 6–4.
