= 2022 Libéma Open – Women's singles =

Women's singles
- 2022 Libéma Open

Final
- Champion: Ekaterina Alexandrova
- Runner-up: Aryna Sabalenka
- Score: 7–5, 6–0

Details
- Draw: 32 (6 Q / 3 WC )
- Seeds: 8

Events
Singles	men	women
Doubles	men	women
← 2019 ·	Libéma Open	· 2023 →

Ekaterina Alexandrova defeated Aryna Sabalenka in the final, 7–5, 6–0 to win the women's singles title at the 2022 Rosmalen Grass Court Championships. It was her second WTA Tour singles title, and Alexandrova won the title despite being two points from defeat in the first round.

Alison Riske was the defending champion from when the event was last held in 2019, but she chose to compete in Nottingham instead.

== Seeds ==
1. Aryna Sabalenka (final)
2. (Switzerland) Belinda Bencic (quarterfinals)
3. (Kazakhstan) Elena Rybakina (second round)
4. (Slovenia) Tamara Zidanšek (second round)
5. Liudmila Samsonova (first round)
6. Veronika Kudermetova (semifinals)
7. Ekaterina Alexandrova (champion)
8. (Belgium) Elise Mertens (second round)

== Draw ==
=== Key ===
- Q = Qualifier
- WC = Wild card
- LL = Lucky loser
- Alt = Alternate
- SE = Special exempt
- PR = Protected ranking
- ITF = ITF entry
- JE = Junior exempt
- w/o = Walkover
- r = Retired
- d = Defaulted
- SR = Special ranking

=== Finals ===
Semifinals
1	Aryna Sabalenka	7^{8}	6
(United States) Shelby Rogers	6^{6}	0
7	Ekaterina Alexandrova	6	6
6	Veronika Kudermetova	3	1

Final
1	Aryna Sabalenka	5	0
7	Ekaterina Alexandrova	7	6

=== Top half ===
First round
1	A Sabalenka	6	6
PR	(Ukraine) K Baindl	4	1
WC	(Netherlands) A Hartono	6	3	6
Q	(Australia) T Preston	4	6	4
(Belgium) A Van Uytvanck	6	7
(Germany) T Korpatsch	4	5
Q	(Australia) S Sanders	7^{7}	1	2
8	(Belgium) E Mertens	6^{5}	6	6
3	(Kazakhstan) E Rybakina	6	7
Q	(United States) J Loeb	4	5
V Diatchenko	2	4
(United States) S Rogers	6	6
PR	(Belgium) K Flipkens	6	5	6
Q	A Tikhonova	2	7	3
(United States) A Li	6	6
5	L Samsonova	3	4

Second round
1	A Sabalenka	6	6
WC	(Netherlands) A Hartono	2	3
(Belgium) A Van Uytvanck	6	6
8	(Belgium) E Mertens	2	3
3	(Kazakhstan) E Rybakina	2	4
(United States) S Rogers	6	6
PR	(Belgium) K Flipkens	6	6
(United States) A Li	1	1

Quarterfinals
1	A Sabalenka	6	3	7^{7}
(Belgium) A Van Uytvanck	3	6	6^{5}
(United States) S Rogers	3	6	6
PR	(Belgium) K Flipkens	6	1	4

Semifinals
1	A Sabalenka	7^{8}	6
(United States) S Rogers	6^{6}	0

=== Bottom half ===
First round
7	E Alexandrova	2	7^{7}	6
(Ukraine) D Yastremska	6	6^{1}	2
(Ukraine) A Kalinina	6	4	6
Q	(Australia) O Gadecki	3	6	4
PR	(Australia) D Saville	6^{3}	3
Q	(United States) C McNally	7^{7}	6
(France) H Tan	6	2	4
4	(Slovenia) T Zidanšek	1	6	6
6	V Kudermetova	6	6
WC	(France) L Jeanjean	2	3
A Blinkova	2	6	6
(Belgium) G Minnen	6	1	4
A Kalinskaya	7^{7}	6
WC	(Netherlands) S Lamens	6^{5}	3
(United States) M Brengle	4	3
2	(Switzerland) B Bencic	6	6

Second round
7	E Alexandrova	6	6
(Ukraine) A Kalinina	4	2
Q	(United States) C McNally	6	6
4	(Slovenia) T Zidanšek	1	1
6	V Kudermetova	5	5
A Blinkova	7	2^{r}
A Kalinskaya	6^{2}	4
2	(Switzerland) B Bencic	7^{7}	6

Quarterfinals
7	E Alexandrova	6	6
Q	(United States) C McNally	0	1
6	V Kudermetova	6	6
2	(Switzerland) B Bencic	4	2

Semifinals
7	E Alexandrova	6	6
6	V Kudermetova	3	1

== Qualifying ==
=== Seeds ===
1. (Netherlands) Lesley Pattinama Kerkhove (first round)
2. (Georgia (country)) Mariam Bolkvadze (first round)
3. (Australia) Olivia Gadecki (qualified)
4. (United States) Alycia Parks (first round)
5. Anastasia Tikhonova (qualified)
6. (Australia) Lizette Cabrera (first round)
7. (Italy) Lucrezia Stefanini (first round)
8. (Greece) Valentini Grammatikopoulou (qualifying competition)
9. (Czech Republic) Linda Fruhvirtová (qualifying competition)
10. (Finland) Anastasia Kulikova (first round)
11. (France) Jessika Ponchet (qualifying competition)
12. (United States) Jamie Loeb (qualified)

=== Qualifiers ===
1. (Australia) Taylah Preston
2. (United States) Jamie Loeb
3. (Australia) Olivia Gadecki
4. (Australia) Storm Sanders
5. Anastasia Tikhonova
6. (United States) Caty McNally

=== Draw ===
==== First qualifier ====
First round
1	(Netherlands) Lesley Pattinama Kerkhove	5	7	5
(Cyprus) Raluca Șerban	7	5	7
WC	(Australia) Taylah Preston	6	4	6
7	(Italy) Lucrezia Stefanini	2	6	4

Qualifying competition
(Cyprus) Raluca Șerban
WC	(Australia) Taylah Preston	w/o

==== Second qualifier ====
First round
2	(Georgia (country)) Mariam Bolkvadze	3	6^{3}
(Switzerland) Susan Bandecchi	6	7^{7}
(Bulgaria) Isabella Shinikova	2	0
12	(United States) Jamie Loeb	6	6

Qualifying competition
(Switzerland) Susan Bandecchi	3	6	4
12	(United States) Jamie Loeb	6	4	6

==== Third qualifier ====
First round
3	(Australia) Olivia Gadecki	6	6
(Netherlands) Richèl Hogenkamp	3	4
WC	(Netherlands) Jasmijn Gimbrère	1	2
9	(Czech Republic) Linda Fruhvirtová	6	6

Qualifying competition
3	(Australia) Olivia Gadecki	6	6^{5}	7
9	(Czech Republic) Linda Fruhvirtová	3	7^{7}	5

==== Fourth qualifier ====
First round
4	(United States) Alycia Parks	3	6^{9}
(Australia) Storm Sanders	6	7^{11}
WC	(Belgium) Yanina Wickmayer	6	7
10	(Finland) Anastasia Kulikova	1	5

Qualifying competition
(Australia) Storm Sanders	6	7
WC	(Belgium) Yanina Wickmayer	1	5

==== Fifth qualifier ====
First round
5	Anastasia Tikhonova	6	6
(Uzbekistan) Nigina Abduraimova	2	3
(Australia) Ellen Perez	7^{9}	4	6^{5}
11	(France) Jessika Ponchet	6^{7}	6	7^{7}

Qualifying competition
5	Anastasia Tikhonova	6	6
11	(France) Jessika Ponchet	2	2

==== Sixth qualifier ====
First round
6	(Australia) Lizette Cabrera	6	4	4
(United States) Caty McNally	2	6	6
WC	(Netherlands) Indy de Vroome	2	4
8	(Greece) Valentini Grammatikopoulou	6	6

Qualifying competition
(United States) Caty McNally	6	6
8	(Greece) Valentini Grammatikopoulou	1	2
