= 2022 Libéma Open =

- Date: 6–12 June
- Edition: 31st
- Category: ATP Tour 250; WTA 250
- Draw: 28S / 16D (men); 32S / 16D (women)
- Prize money: €648,130 (ATP) $251,750 (WTA)
- Surface: Grass
- Location: Rosmalen, 's-Hertogenbosch, Netherlands

Champions

Men's singles
- (Netherlands) Tim van Rijthoven

Women's singles
- Ekaterina Alexandrova

Men's doubles
- (Netherlands) Wesley Koolhof / (United Kingdom) Neal Skupski

Women's doubles
- (Australia) Ellen Perez / (Slovenia) Tamara Zidanšek
- Rosmalen Grass Court Championships

The 2022 Libéma Open was a professional tennis tournament played on the outdoor grass courts at Autotron Rosmalen in Rosmalen, 's-Hertogenbosch, Netherlands from 6 June to 12 June 2022. It was the 31st edition of the Rosmalen Grass Court Championships and was classified as an ATP 250 event on the men's 2022 ATP Tour and a WTA 250 event on the women's 2022 WTA Tour. The tournament was previously held in 2019 after the COVID-19 pandemic forced the double postponement of the event.

== Champions ==
=== Men's singles ===
- (Netherlands) Tim van Rijthoven def. Daniil Medvedev, 6–4, 6–1

=== Women's singles ===
- Ekaterina Alexandrova def. Aryna Sabalenka 7–5, 6–0

This was Alexandrova's second WTA Tour singles title, and first of the year

=== Men's doubles ===
- (Netherlands) Wesley Koolhof / (United Kingdom) Neal Skupski def. (Australia) Matthew Ebden / (Australia) Max Purcell 4–6, 7–5, [10–6]

=== Women's doubles ===
- (Australia) Ellen Perez / (Slovenia) Tamara Zidanšek def. Veronika Kudermetova / (Belgium) Elise Mertens 6–3, 5–7, [12–10]

== ATP Points ==
Event	W	F	SF	QF	R16	R32	Q	Q2	Q1
Men's singles	250	150	90	45	20*	10	5	3	0
Men's doubles	250	150	90	45	0	—N/a	—N/a	—N/a	—N/a

- Players with byes receive first round points.

=== Prize money ===
Event	W	F	SF	QF	Round of 16	Round of 32	Q2	Q1
Singles	€98,580	€57,505	€33,805	€19,595	€11,375	€6,950	€3,475	€1,895
Doubles*	€34,250	€18,320	€10,750	€6,000	€3,540	—N/a	—N/a	—N/a

_{*per team}

== ATP singles main draw entrants ==
=== Seeds ===
Country	Player	Rank^{1}	Seed
	Daniil Medvedev	2	1
CAN	Félix Auger-Aliassime	9	2
USA	Taylor Fritz	14	3
AUS	Alex de Minaur	20	4
	Karen Khachanov	25	5
NED	Botic van de Zandschulp	29	6
USA	Tommy Paul	33	7
USA	Jenson Brooksby	34	8

- ^{1} Rankings are as of May 23, 2022.

=== Other entrants ===
The following players received wildcards into the main draw:

- (Netherlands) Jesper de Jong
- (Netherlands) Robin Haase
- (Netherlands) Tim van Rijthoven

The following player received entry using a protected ranking into the main draw:

- (Slovenia) Aljaž Bedene

The following players received entry from the qualifying draw:

- (Australia) Matthew Ebden
- (United States) Sam Querrey
- (Italy) Andreas Seppi
- (France) Gilles Simon

=== Withdrawals ===
- (Croatia) Marin Čilić → replaced by (Chile) Alejandro Tabilo
- (Belgium) David Goffin → replaced by (Poland) Kamil Majchrzak

== ATP doubles main draw entrants ==
=== Seeds ===
Country	Player	Country	Player	Rank^{1}	Seed
FRA	Pierre-Hugues Herbert	FRA	Nicolas Mahut	13	1
NED	Wesley Koolhof	GBR	Neal Skupski	23	2
~~ESA~~	~~Marcelo Arévalo~~	~~NED~~	~~Jean-Julien Rojer~~	~~57~~	~~3~~
AUS	Matthew Ebden	AUS	Max Purcell	69	4

- ^{1} Rankings are as of May 23, 2022.

=== Other entrants ===
The following pairs received wildcards into the doubles main draw:

- (Netherlands) Jesper de Jong / (Netherlands) Bart Stevens
- (Netherlands) Tallon Griekspoor / Daniil Medvedev

The following pairs received entry as alternates:

- (Netherlands) Gijs Brouwer / (Netherlands) Tim van Rijthoven
- (United States) Brandon Nakashima / (Finland) Emil Ruusuvuori

=== Withdrawals ===
Before the tournament

- (El Salvador) Marcelo Arévalo / (Netherlands) Jean-Julien Rojer → replaced by (United States) Brandon Nakashima / (Finland) Emil Ruusuvuori
- (Croatia) Ivan Dodig / (United States) Austin Krajicek → replaced by (Czech Republic) Roman Jebavý / (Ukraine) Denys Molchanov
- (United Kingdom) Lloyd Glasspool / (Finland) Harri Heliövaara → replaced by (Monaco) Hugo Nys / (France) Édouard Roger-Vasselin
- (Chile) Julio Peralta / (Croatia) Franko Škugor → replaced by (Chile) Julio Peralta / (Spain) David Vega Hernández
- (United States) Rajeev Ram / (United Kingdom) Joe Salisbury → replaced by (Netherlands) Gijs Brouwer / (Netherlands) Tim van Rijthoven

== WTA singles main draw entrants ==
=== Seeds ===
Country	Player	Rank^{1}	Seed
	Aryna Sabalenka	7	1
SUI	Belinda Bencic	14	2
KAZ	Elena Rybakina	16	3
SLO	Tamara Zidanšek	25	4
	Liudmila Samsonova	27	5
	Veronika Kudermetova	29	6
	Ekaterina Alexandrova	31	7
BEL	Elise Mertens	32	8

- ^{1} Rankings are as of May 23, 2022.

=== Other entrants ===
The following players received wildcards into the main draw:

- (Netherlands) Arianne Hartono
- (France) Léolia Jeanjean
- (Netherlands) Suzan Lamens

The following players received entry using a protected ranking into the singles main draw:

- (Ukraine) Kateryna Baindl
- (Belgium) Kirsten Flipkens
- (Australia) Daria Saville

The following players received entry from the qualifying draw:

- (Australia) Olivia Gadecki
- (United States) Jamie Loeb
- (United States) Caty McNally
- (Australia) Taylah Preston
- (Australia) Storm Sanders
- Anastasia Tikhonova

=== Withdrawals ===
Before the tournament

- (Czech Republic) Marie Bouzková → replaced by (Germany) Tamara Korpatsch
- (United States) Danielle Collins → replaced by (Belgium) Kirsten Flipkens
- Daria Kasatkina → replaced by (France) Harmony Tan
- Anastasia Pavlyuchenkova → replaced by (Belgium) Greet Minnen
- Aliaksandra Sasnovich → replaced by (Ukraine) Kateryna Baindl
- (Czech Republic) Kateřina Siniaková → replaced by (Australia) Daria Saville

== WTA doubles main draw entrants ==
=== Seeds ===
Country	Player	Country	Player	Rank^{1}	Seed
	Veronika Kudermetova	BEL	Elise Mertens	6	1
USA	Desirae Krawczyk	NED	Demi Schuurs	25	2
USA	Kaitlyn Christian	MEX	Giuliana Olmos	77	3
JPN	Eri Hozumi	JPN	Makoto Ninomiya	77	4

- ^{1} Rankings are as of May 23, 2022.

=== Other entrants ===
The following pairs received wildcards into the doubles main draw:

- (Netherlands) Isabelle Haverlag / (Netherlands) Suzan Lamens
- (Netherlands) Lesley Pattinama Kerkhove / (Belgium) Yanina Wickmayer

The following pair received entry into the doubles main draw using a protected ranking:

- (Poland) Paula Kania-Choduń / (France) Elixane Lechemia

=== Withdrawals ===
Before the tournament

- Anna Blinkova / Aliaksandra Sasnovich → replaced by (Poland) Paula Kania-Choduń / (France) Elixane Lechemia
- (United States) Kaitlyn Christian / Lidziya Marozava → replaced by (United States) Kaitlyn Christian / (Mexico) Giuliana Olmos
- (United States) Nicole Melichar-Martinez / (Australia) Ellen Perez → replaced by (Australia) Ellen Perez / (Slovenia) Tamara Zidanšek
