= 2022 US Open – Men's singles =

Tennis championship

Men's singles
- 2022 US Open

Final
- Champion: (Spain) Carlos Alcaraz
- Runner-up: (Norway) Casper Ruud
- Score: 6–4, 2–6, 7–6^{(7–1)}, 6–3

Details
- Draw: 128
- Seeds: 32

Events
Singles	men	women		boys	girls
Doubles	men	women	mixed	boys	girls
WC Singles	men	women	quad	boys	girls
WC Doubles	men	women	quad	boys	girls
- US Open

Carlos Alcaraz defeated Casper Ruud in the final, 6–4, 2–6, 7–6^{(7–1)}, 6–3 to win the men's singles tennis title at the 2022 US Open. It was his first major title. Alcaraz claimed the world No. 1 singles ranking for the first time with the win; Ruud, Rafael Nadal, Daniil Medvedev, and Stefanos Tsitsipas were also in contention for the top position. He saved a match point en route to the title, in the quarterfinals against Jannik Sinner. Alcaraz was the youngest men's major champion since Nadal at the 2005 French Open, the youngest US Open champion since Pete Sampras in 1990, the first man born in the 2000s and the first Generation Z to win a major singles title, and the youngest man to be ranked world No. 1, surpassing Lleyton Hewitt's record. At 23 hours and 39 minutes of play duration across his seven matches, Alcaraz spent the longest time on court in major history (a record later surpassed by Medvedev at the 2024 Australian Open, 24 hours 17 minutes).

Medvedev was the defending champion, but lost in the fourth round to Nick Kyrgios. Medvedev was the first man outside the Big Four to be the top seed at a major since Andy Roddick at the 2004 Australian Open.

Nadal was vying for a record-extending 23rd major singles title, but lost in the fourth round to Frances Tiafoe. Alongside Medvedev's loss at the same stage, that marked the first US Open since 2000 and the first major since the 2017 Australian Open with neither of the top two seeded men reaching the quarterfinals. This was also the four-time champion's final appearance at the US Open. Three-time champion Novak Djokovic withdrew prior to the tournament as he could not travel to the United States, due to not having complied with the federal government's vaccination policy for non-US citizens against COVID-19.

This marked the third consecutive US Open where a player claimed his first major title, after Dominic Thiem in 2020 and Medvedev in 2021. The quarterfinal line-up guaranteed a first-time major champion, while the semifinal line-up marked the first time all four players made their US Open semifinal debut since the inaugural edition in 1881. Tiafoe was the first American man to reach the semifinals since Roddick in 2006, the first African American man to do so since Arthur Ashe in 1972, and the first African American man to reach any major semifinal since MaliVai Washington in 1996. Sinner was the youngest man to reach the quarterfinals at all four majors since Djokovic in 2008.

This was the first edition of US Open to feature a 10-point tie-break, when the score reaches six games all in the deciding set. Pedro Cachin defeated Aljaž Bedene in the first round in the first main-draw 10-point tie-break at the US Open.

== Seeds ==
1. (Note: On March 1, 2022, the ATP announced that players from Russia and Belarus will not be allowed to compete under the name or flag of Russia or Belarus following the 2022 Russian invasion of Ukraine. On June 14, 2022, the USTA announced that it will allow all eligible players, regardless of nationality, to compete at the 2022 US Open.)Daniil Medvedev (fourth round)
2. (Spain) Rafael Nadal (fourth round)
3. (Spain) Carlos Alcaraz (champion)
4. (Greece) Stefanos Tsitsipas (first round)
5. (Norway) Casper Ruud (final)
6. (Canada) Félix Auger-Aliassime (second round)
7. (United Kingdom) Cameron Norrie (fourth round)
8. (Poland) Hubert Hurkacz (second round)
9. Andrey Rublev (quarter-finals)
10. (United States) Taylor Fritz (first round)
11. (Italy) Jannik Sinner (quarter-finals)
12. (Spain) Pablo Carreño Busta (fourth round)
13. (Italy) Matteo Berrettini (quarter-finals)
14. (Argentina) Diego Schwartzman (third round)
15. (Croatia) Marin Čilić (fourth round)
16. (Spain) Roberto Bautista Agut (first round)

17. (Bulgaria) Grigor Dimitrov (second round)
18. (Australia) Alex de Minaur (third round)
19. (Canada) Denis Shapovalov (third round)
20. (United Kingdom) Dan Evans (third round)
21. (Netherlands) Botic van de Zandschulp (second round)
22. (United States) Frances Tiafoe (semi-finals)
23. (Australia) Nick Kyrgios (quarter-finals)
24. (Argentina) Francisco Cerúndolo (first round)
25. (Croatia) Borna Ćorić (second round)
26. (Italy) Lorenzo Musetti (third round)
27. Karen Khachanov (semi-finals)
28. (Denmark) Holger Rune (third round)
29. (United States) Tommy Paul (third round)
30. (United States) Maxime Cressy (first round, retired)
31. (Georgia (country)) Nikoloz Basilashvili (first round)
32. (Serbia) Miomir Kecmanović (second round)

Click on the seed number of a player to go to their draw section.

== Draw ==
Key

- Q = Qualifier
- WC = Wild card
- LL = Lucky loser
- Alt = Alternate
- ITF = ITF entry
- PR = Protected ranking
- SR = Special ranking
- SE = Special exempt
- JE = Junior exempt
- JR = Junior Accelerator Programme entrant
- CO = College Accelerator Programme entrant
- NG = Next Gen Accelerator Program entrant
- w/o = Walkover
- r = Retired
- d = Defaulted

=== Finals ===
Quarter-finals
23	(Australia) Nick Kyrgios	5	6	5	7^{7}	4
27	Karen Khachanov	7	4	7	6^{3}	6
13	(Italy) Matteo Berrettini	1	4	6^{4}
5	(Norway) Casper Ruud	6	6	7^{7}
11	(Italy) Jannik Sinner	3	7^{9}	7^{7}	5	3
3	(Spain) Carlos Alcaraz	6	6^{7}	6^{0}	7	6
9	Andrey Rublev	6^{3}	6^{0}	4
22	(United States) Frances Tiafoe	7^{7}	7^{7}	6

Semi-finals
27	Karen Khachanov	6^{5}	2	7	2
5	(Norway) Casper Ruud	7^{7}	6	5	6
3	(Spain) Carlos Alcaraz	6^{6}	6	6	6^{5}	6
22	(United States) Frances Tiafoe	7^{8}	3	1	7^{7}	3

Final
5	(Norway) Casper Ruud	4	6	6^{1}	3
3	(Spain) Carlos Alcaraz	6	2	7^{7}	6

=== Top half ===
==== Section 1 ====
First round
1	D Medvedev	6	6	6
(United States) S Kozlov	2	4	0
(France) Q Halys	6	6^{4}	3	2
(France) A Rinderknech	4	7^{7}	6	6
WC	(United States) B Shelton	6^{6}	6	6^{5}	7^{10}	3
Q	(Portugal) N Borges	7^{8}	3	7^{7}	6^{8}	6
Q	(China) Y Wu	6	6	6
31	(Georgia (country)) N Basilashvili	3	4	0
23	(Australia) N Kyrgios	6	6	7^{7}
(Australia) T Kokkinakis	3	4	6^{4}
(France) B Bonzi	7^{7}	6	5	3	6
WC	(France) U Humbert	6^{1}	1	7	6	2
(Chile) A Tabilo	6	6	6^{3}	6
(Poland) K Majchrzak	1	4	7^{7}	1
WC	(United States) JJ Wolf	6	6	6
16	(Spain) R Bautista Agut	4	4	4

Second round
1	D Medvedev	6	7	6
(France) A Rinderknech	2	5	3
Q	(Portugal) N Borges	7^{7}	6^{4}	6	4	4
Q	(China) Y Wu	6^{3}	7^{7}	4	6	6
23	(Australia) N Kyrgios	7^{7}	6	4	6
(France) B Bonzi	6^{3}	4	6	4
(Chile) A Tabilo	6	5	4	3
WC	(United States) JJ Wolf	4	7	6	6

Third round
1	D Medvedev	6	6	6
Q	(China) Y Wu	4	2	2
23	(Australia) N Kyrgios	6	6	6
WC	(United States) JJ Wolf	4	2	3

Fourth round
1	D Medvedev	6^{11}	6	3	2
23	(Australia) N Kyrgios	7^{13}	3	6	6

==== Section 2 ====
First round
12	(Spain) P Carreño Busta	7	6	5	6
WC	(Austria) D Thiem	5	1	7	3
(Kazakhstan) A Bublik	6	6	6
(France) H Gaston	4	4	4
(Chile) C Garín	3	7^{7}	7	6
(Czech Republic) J Lehečka	6	6^{3}	5	1
(Serbia) F Krajinović	5	2	3
18	(Australia) A de Minaur	7	6	6
27	K Khachanov	3	6	6	6
(United States) D Kudla	6	1	2	2
(Slovakia) A Molčan	4	6	4	1
(Brazil) T Monteiro	6	4	6	6
(United Kingdom) J Draper	6	6	6
(Finland) E Ruusuvuori	4	3	3
Q	(Switzerland) A Ritschard	3	4	6	3
6	(Canada) F Auger-Aliassime	6	6	3	6

Second round
12	(Spain) P Carreño Busta	4	6	6	7^{7}
(Kazakhstan) A Bublik	6	4	3	6^{5}
(Chile) C Garín	3	0	6	2
18	(Australia) A de Minaur	6	6	4	6
27	K Khachanov	6	6	5	6
(Brazil) T Monteiro	3	3	7	4
(United Kingdom) J Draper	6	6	6
6	(Canada) F Auger-Aliassime	4	4	4

Third round
12	(Spain) P Carreño Busta	6	6	3	7^{7}
18	(Australia) A de Minaur	1	1	6	6^{5}
27	K Khachanov	6	4	6
(United Kingdom) J Draper	3	6	5^{r}

Fourth round
12	(Spain) P Carreño Busta	6	3	1	6	3
27	K Khachanov	4	6	6	4	6

==== Section 3 ====
First round
4	(Greece) S Tsitsipas	0	1	6	5
Q	(Colombia) DE Galán	6	6	3	7
(Italy) L Sonego	6	6	2	4	4
(Australia) J Thompson	2	1	6	6	6
(Japan) Y Nishioka	3	5	3
(Spain) A Davidovich Fokina	6	7	6
(Hungary) M Fucsovics	6^{4}	7	5
30	(United States) M Cressy	7^{7}	5	1^{r}
24	(Argentina) F Cerúndolo	5	3	3
(United Kingdom) A Murray	7	6	6
(Australia) J Millman	6^{7}	6	6^{4}	6	1
WC	(United States) E Nava	7^{9}	4	7^{7}	1	6
(Argentina) TM Etcheverry	6	2	3	4
LL	(France) H Grenier	4	6	6	6
Q	(Chile) N Jarry	2	3	3
13	(Italy) M Berrettini	6	6	6

Second round
Q	(Colombia) DE Galán	6	2	3	6	6
(Australia) J Thompson	3	6	6	4	3
(Spain) A Davidovich Fokina	7^{7}	5	3	6	7^{10}
(Hungary) M Fucsovics	6^{3}	7	6	0	6^{3}
(United Kingdom) A Murray	5	6	6	6
WC	(United States) E Nava	7	3	1	0
LL	(France) H Grenier	6	1	6^{4}	6^{7}
13	(Italy) M Berrettini	2	6	7^{7}	7^{9}

Third round
Q	(Colombia) DE Galán	4	7	4	4
(Spain) A Davidovich Fokina	6	5	6	6
(United Kingdom) A Murray	4	4	7^{7}	3
13	(Italy) M Berrettini	6	6	6^{1}	6

Fourth round
(Spain) A Davidovich Fokina	6	6^{2}	3	6	2
13	(Italy) M Berrettini	3	7^{7}	6	4	6

==== Section 4 ====
First round
10	(United States) T Fritz	7^{7}	6^{1}	3	4
Q	(United States) B Holt	6^{3}	7^{7}	6	6
PR	(Slovenia) A Bedene	4	3	7	6	6^{6}
(Argentina) P Cachin	6	6	5	1	7^{10}
PR	(Switzerland) S Wawrinka	4	6^{7}	0^{r}
LL	(France) C Moutet	6	7^{9}	0
Q	(Czech Republic) T Macháč	6	6^{3}	1	6	5
21	(Netherlands) B van de Zandschulp	3	7^{7}	6	3	7
29	(United States) T Paul	4	6	2	6	7
(Spain) B Zapata Miralles	6	3	6	0	5
(United States) S Korda	5	7^{7}	7	6
Q	(Argentina) F Bagnis	7	6^{3}	5	1
Q	(China) Z Zhang	6	7^{7}	6^{9}	1	4
(Netherlands) T van Rijthoven	3	6^{4}	7^{11}	6	6
PR	(United Kingdom) K Edmund	3	5	2
5	(Norway) C Ruud	6	7	6

Second round
Q	(United States) B Holt	6	6	1	6^{1}	6^{6}
(Argentina) P Cachin	1	2	6	7^{7}	7^{10}
LL	(France) C Moutet	6	1	6	6
21	(Netherlands) B van de Zandschulp	4	6	2	4
29	(United States) T Paul	6	3	4	6	6
(United States) S Korda	0	6	6	3	4
(Netherlands) T van Rijthoven	7^{7}	4	4	4
5	(Norway) C Ruud	6^{4}	6	6	6

Third round
(Argentina) P Cachin	3	6	2	5
LL	(France) C Moutet	6	4	6	7
29	(United States) T Paul	6^{3}	7^{7}	6^{2}	7	0
5	(Norway) C Ruud	7^{7}	6^{5}	7^{7}	5	6

Fourth round
LL	(France) C Moutet	1	2	7^{7}	2
5	(Norway) C Ruud	6	6	6^{4}	6

=== Bottom half ===
==== Section 5 ====
First round
8	(Poland) H Hurkacz	6	6	6
(Germany) O Otte	4	2	4
WC	(United States) S Querrey	6	4	6^{8}	3
I Ivashka	4	6	7^{10}	6
(France) A Mannarino	3	4	4
Q	(Netherlands) G Brouwer	6	6	6
(Belgium) D Goffin	6	5	4	6	6^{9}
26	(Italy) L Musetti	3	7	6	3	7^{11}
17	(Bulgaria) G Dimitrov	6	6	6
(United States) S Johnson	3	2	2
(United States) B Nakashima	7^{7}	6	6
Q	P Kotov	6^{4}	2	2
(Spain) P Martínez	5	3	6^{3}
Q	(United States) C Eubanks	7	6	7^{7}
(Germany) D Altmaier	7	2	1	6	1
11	(Italy) J Sinner	5	6	6	3	6

Second round
8	(Poland) H Hurkacz	4	6	6^{5}	3
I Ivashka	6	4	7^{7}	6
Q	(Netherlands) G Brouwer	7^{7}	3	4	2
26	(Italy) L Musetti	6^{1}	6	6	6
17	(Bulgaria) G Dimitrov	6^{5}	5	3
(United States) B Nakashima	7^{7}	7	6
Q	(United States) C Eubanks	4	6^{8}	2
11	(Italy) J Sinner	6	7^{10}	6

Third round
I Ivashka	6	3	6	6
26	(Italy) L Musetti	4	6	2	3
(United States) B Nakashima	6	4	1	2
11	(Italy) J Sinner	3	6	6	6

Fourth round
I Ivashka	1	7	2	6	3
11	(Italy) J Sinner	6	5	6	4	6

==== Section 6 ====
First round
15	(Croatia) M Čilić	6	6	7
Q	(Germany) M Marterer	3	2	5
Q	(Slovakia) N Gombos	3	4	5
(Spain) A Ramos Viñolas	6	6	7
(Australia) J Duckworth	4	7^{7}	6	6
(Australia) C O'Connell	6	6^{0}	2	3
(Czech Republic) J Veselý	4	1	1
20	(United Kingdom) D Evans	6	6	6
25/PR	(Croatia) B Ćorić	6	7^{7}	3	4	7
Q	(France) E Couacaud	2	6^{5}	6	6	5
(United States) J Brooksby	6	6	3
(Serbia) D Lajović	2	0	0^{r}
(Netherlands) T Griekspoor	5	4	3
(Argentina) F Coria	7	6	6
(Argentina) S Báez	5	5	0^{r}
3	(Spain) C Alcaraz	7	7	2

Second round
15	(Croatia) M Čilić	6	7^{7}	6
(Spain) A Ramos Viñolas	3	6^{4}	3
(Australia) J Duckworth	3	2	6	4
20	(United Kingdom) D Evans	6	6	4	6
25/PR	(Croatia) B Ćorić	4	6^{10}	1
(United States) J Brooksby	6	7^{12}	6
(Argentina) F Coria	2	1	5
3	(Spain) C Alcaraz	6	6	7

Third round
15	(Croatia) M Čilić	7^{13}	6^{3}	6	7
20	(United Kingdom) D Evans	6^{11}	7^{7}	2	5
(United States) J Brooksby	3	3	3
3	(Spain) C Alcaraz	6	6	6

Fourth round
15	(Croatia) M Čilić	4	6	4	6	3
3	(Spain) C Alcaraz	6	3	6	4	6

==== Section 7 ====
First round
7	(United Kingdom) C Norrie	6	7^{7}	6
(France) B Paire	0	6^{1}	0
(Portugal) J Sousa	1	7^{7}	7^{7}	6
(United States) M McDonald	6	6^{4}	6^{4}	3
(United States) J Isner	6	6	7
Q	(Argentina) F Delbonis	3	1	5
(Germany) P Gojowczyk	2	4	6^{5}
28	(Denmark) H Rune	6	6	7^{7}
19	(Canada) D Shapovalov	2	6	6	3	6
(Switzerland) M-A Hüsler	6	4	4	6	1
(Spain) J Munar	1	3	6	2
(Spain) R Carballés Baena	6	6	4	6
LL	(Spain) F Verdasco	2	7^{7}	3	3
(South Korea) S-w Kwon	6	6^{4}	6	6
(Serbia) L Djere	6^{5}	3	6	6	4
9	A Rublev	7^{7}	6	3	4	6

Second round
7	(United Kingdom) C Norrie	6	6	7^{7}
(Portugal) J Sousa	4	4	6^{4}
(United States) J Isner
28	(Denmark) H Rune	w/o
19	(Canada) D Shapovalov	6	4	6	6
(Spain) R Carballés Baena	4	6	3	2
(South Korea) S-w Kwon	3	0	4
9	A Rublev	6	6	6

Third round
7	(United Kingdom) C Norrie	7	6	6
28	(Denmark) H Rune	5	4	1
19	(Canada) D Shapovalov	4	6	7^{7}	4	6^{7}
9	A Rublev	6	2	6^{3}	6	7^{10}

Fourth round
7	(United Kingdom) C Norrie	4	4	4
9	A Rublev	6	6	6

==== Section 8 ====
First round
14	(Argentina) D Schwartzman	3	5	6	1
(United States) J Sock	6	7	0	0^{r}
(Australia) A Popyrin	6	7^{7}	7^{7}
(Chinese Taipei) C-h Tseng	3	6^{5}	6^{3}
(Australia) J Kubler	5	6	6	6
(Sweden) M Ymer	7	4	2	4
(United States) M Giron	6^{0}	4	3
22	(United States) F Tiafoe	7^{7}	6	6
32	(Serbia) M Kecmanović	3	6	6	6
WC	(United States) L Tien	6	1	3	3
(Japan) T Daniel	4	7^{7}	2	2
(France) R Gasquet	6	6^{1}	6	6
(Italy) F Fognini	1	5	6	6	6
A Karatsev	6	7	4	1	4
WC	(Australia) R Hijikata	6	2	3	3
2	(Spain) R Nadal	4	6	6	6

Second round
14	(Argentina) D Schwartzman	7^{7}	7	7^{8}
(Australia) A Popyrin	6^{3}	5	6^{6}
(Australia) J Kubler	6^{3}	5	6^{2}
22	(United States) F Tiafoe	7^{7}	7	7^{7}
32	(Serbia) M Kecmanović	2	4	6	4
(France) R Gasquet	6	6	4	6
(Italy) F Fognini	6	4	2	1
2	(Spain) R Nadal	2	6	6	6

Third round
14	(Argentina) D Schwartzman	6^{7}	4	4
22	(United States) F Tiafoe	7^{9}	6	6
(France) R Gasquet	0	1	5
2	(Spain) R Nadal	6	6	7

Fourth round
22	(United States) F Tiafoe	6	4	6	6
2	(Spain) R Nadal	4	6	4	3

== Seeded players ==
The following are the seeded players. Seedings are based on ATP rankings as of August 22, 2022. Rankings and points before are as of August 29, 2022.

Points for the 2021 tournament were not mandatory and are included in the table below only if they counted toward the player's ranking as of August 29, 2022. Players who are not defending points from the 2021 tournament will instead have their 19th best result replaced by their points from the 2022 tournament.

Seed	Rank	Player	Points before	Points defending (or 19th best result)^{†}	Points won	Points after	Status
1	1	Daniil Medvedev	6,885	2,000	180	5,065	Fourth round lost to (Australia) Nick Kyrgios [23]
2	3	(Spain) Rafael Nadal	5,630	(0)	180	5,810	Fourth round lost to (United States) Frances Tiafoe [22]
3	4	(Spain) Carlos Alcaraz	5,100	360	2,000	6,740	Champion, defeated (Norway) Casper Ruud [5]
4	5	(Greece) Stefanos Tsitsipas	4,890	90	10	4,810	First round lost to (Colombia) Daniel Elahi Galán (Q)
5	7	(Norway) Casper Ruud	4,695	45	1,200	5,850	Runner-up, lost to (Spain) Carlos Alcaraz [3]
6	8	(Canada) Félix Auger-Aliassime	3,625	720	45	2,950	Second round lost to (United Kingdom) Jack Draper
7	9	(United Kingdom) Cameron Norrie	3,415	(45)	180	3,550	Fourth round lost to Andrey Rublev [9]
8	10	(Poland) Hubert Hurkacz	3,355	45	45	3,355	Second round lost to Ilya Ivashka
9	11	Andrey Rublev	3,120	90	360	3,390	Quarter-finals lost to (United States) Frances Tiafoe [22]
10	12	(United States) Taylor Fritz	3,090	45	10	3,055	First round lost to (United States) Brandon Holt (Q)
11	13	(Italy) Jannik Sinner	3,020	180	360	3,200	Quarter-finals lost to (Spain) Carlos Alcaraz [3]
12	15	(Spain) Pablo Carreño Busta	2,340	10	180	2,510	Fourth round lost to Karen Khachanov [27]
13	14	(Italy) Matteo Berrettini	2,360	360	360	2,360	Quarter-finals lost to (Norway) Casper Ruud [5]
14	16	(Argentina) Diego Schwartzman	2,200	180	90	2,110	Third round lost to (United States) Frances Tiafoe [22]
15	17	(Croatia) Marin Čilić	2,175	10	180	2,345	Fourth round lost to (Spain) Carlos Alcaraz [3]
16	18	(Spain) Roberto Bautista Agut	1,840	90	10	1,760	First round lost to (United States) J. J. Wolf (WC)
17	19	(Bulgaria) Grigor Dimitrov	1,730	45	45	1,730	Second round lost to (United States) Brandon Nakashima
18	20	(Australia) Alex de Minaur	1,665	10	90	1,745	Third round lost to (Spain) Pablo Carreño Busta [12]
19	21	(Canada) Denis Shapovalov	1,640	90	90	1,640	Third round lost to Andrey Rublev [9]
20	23	(United Kingdom) Dan Evans	1,510	180	90	1,420	Third round lost to (Croatia) Marin Čilić [15]
21	22	(Netherlands) Botic van de Zandschulp	1,573	385	45	1,233	Second round lost to (France) Corentin Moutet (LL)
22	26	(United States) Frances Tiafoe	1,400	180	720	1,940	Semi-finals lost to (Spain) Carlos Alcaraz [3]
23	25	(Australia) Nick Kyrgios	1,430	10	360	1,780	Quarter-finals lost to Karen Khachanov [27]
24	27	(Argentina) Francisco Cerúndolo	1,400	16	10	1,394	First round lost to (United Kingdom) Andy Murray
25	29	(Croatia) Borna Ćorić	1,360	(0)	45	1,405	Second round lost to (United States) Jenson Brooksby
26	30	(Italy) Lorenzo Musetti	1,322	45	90	1,367	Third round lost to Ilya Ivashka
27	31	Karen Khachanov	1,315	(45)	720	1,990	Semi-finals lost to (Norway) Casper Ruud [5]
28	33	(Denmark) Holger Rune	1,310	35	90	1,365	Third round lost to (United Kingdom) Cameron Norrie [7]
29	34	(United States) Tommy Paul	1,305	(20)	90	1,375	Third round lost to (Norway) Casper Ruud [5]
30	32	(United States) Maxime Cressy	1,313	70	10	1,253	First round retired against (Hungary) Márton Fucsovics
31	35	(Georgia (country)) Nikoloz Basilashvili	1,290	90	10	1,210	First round lost to (China) Wu Yibing (Q)
32	36	(Serbia) Miomir Kecmanović	1,245	10	45	1,280	Second round lost to (France) Richard Gasquet

† This column shows either the player's points from the 2021 tournament or his 19th best result (shown in brackets). Only ranking points counting toward the player's ranking as of August 29, 2022, are reflected in the column.

=== Withdrawn players ===
The following players would have been seeded, but withdrew before the tournament began.

Rank	Player	Points before	Points defending	Points after	Withdrawal reason
2	(Germany) Alexander Zverev	5,760	720	5,040	Right ankle injury
6	(Serbia) Novak Djokovic	4,770	1,200	3,570	Failure to meet vaccination requirement for non-US citizens
24	(France) Gaël Monfils	1,435	90	1,345	Foot injury
28	(United States) Reilly Opelka	1,365	180	1,185	Heel injury

== Other entry information ==
=== Wild cards ===
- (Australia) Rinky Hijikata
- (France) Ugo Humbert
- (United States) Emilio Nava
- (United States) Sam Querrey
- (United States) Ben Shelton
- (Austria) Dominic Thiem
- (United States) Learner Tien
- (United States) J. J. Wolf

=== Protected ranking ===
- (Switzerland) Stan Wawrinka (22)
- (Croatia) Borna Ćorić (27)
- (United Kingdom) Kyle Edmund (48)
- (Slovenia) Aljaž Bedene (75)

=== Qualifiers ===
- (Argentina) Facundo Bagnis
- (Portugal) Nuno Borges
- (Netherlands) Gijs Brouwer
- (France) Enzo Couacaud
- (Argentina) Federico Delbonis
- (United States) Christopher Eubanks
- (Colombia) Daniel Elahi Galán
- (Slovakia) Norbert Gombos
- (United States) Brandon Holt
- (Chile) Nicolás Jarry
- Pavel Kotov
- (Czech Republic) Tomáš Macháč
- (Germany) Maximilian Marterer
- (Switzerland) Alexander Ritschard
- (China) Wu Yibing
- (China) Zhang Zhizhen

=== Lucky losers ===
- (France) Hugo Grenier
- (France) Corentin Moutet
- (Spain) Fernando Verdasco

=== Withdrawals ===
The entry list was released by the United States Tennis Association based on the ATP rankings for the week of July 18.

- † (South Africa) Lloyd Harris (46) → replaced by (Netherlands) Tim van Rijthoven (101)
- ‡ (France) Gaël Monfils (20) → replaced by (Japan) Taro Daniel (102)
- ‡ (Germany) Alexander Zverev (2) → replaced by (United States) Stefan Kozlov (103)
- ‡ (United States) Reilly Opelka (17) → replaced by (United States) Jack Sock (104) (Note: Last direct acceptance)
- @ (Serbia) Novak Djokovic (7) → replaced by (France) Corentin Moutet (LL)
- § (Bolivia) Hugo Dellien (74) → replaced by (Spain) Fernando Verdasco (LL)
- § (Spain) Pablo Andújar (92) → replaced by (France) Hugo Grenier (LL)

† – not included on entry list
‡ – withdrew from entry list before qualifying draw
@ – withdrew from entry list after qualifying draw
§ – withdrew from main draw

== See also ==
- 2022 ATP Tour
- 2022 ATP Finals

== Notes ==
Preceded by 2022 Wimbledon Championships – Men's singles	Grand Slam men's singles	Succeeded by 2023 Australian Open – Men's singles
