= 2021 Open de Rennes =

- Date: 13–19 September
- Edition: 15th
- Surface: Hard (Indoor)
- Location: Rennes, France

Champions

Singles
- (France) Benjamin Bonzi

Doubles
- (Netherlands) Bart Stevens / (Netherlands) Tim van Rijthoven
← 2020 ·	Open de Rennes	· 2022 →

The 2021 Open Blot Rennes was a professional tennis tournament played on hard courts. It was the fifteenth edition of the tournament and part of the 2021 ATP Challenger Tour. It took place in Rennes, France between 13 and 19 September 2021.

== Singles main-draw entrants ==
=== Seeds ===
Country	Player	Rank^{1}	Seed
FRA	Richard Gasquet	79	1
FRA	Arthur Rinderknech	83	2
FRA	Benjamin Bonzi	94	3
FRA	Gilles Simon	103	4
GBR	Andy Murray	112	5
FRA	Lucas Pouille	133	6
FRA	Grégoire Barrère	136	7
CZE	Tomáš Macháč	143	8

- ^{1} Rankings are as of 30 August 2021.

=== Other entrants ===
The following players received wildcards into the singles main draw:

- (France) Kyrian Jacquet
- (France) Harold Mayot
- (United Kingdom) Andy Murray

The following player received entry into the singles main draw as an alternate:

- (Russia) Teymuraz Gabashvili

The following players received entry from the qualifying draw:

- (Italy) Alessandro Bega
- (France) Clément Chidekh
- (France) Manuel Guinard
- (France) Calvin Hemery

The following players received entry as lucky losers:

- (France) Dan Added
- (Germany) Mats Rosenkranz

== Champions ==
=== Singles ===
- (France) Benjamin Bonzi def. (Germany) Mats Moraing 7–6^{(7–3)}, 7–6^{(7–3)}.

=== Doubles ===
- (Netherlands) Bart Stevens / (Netherlands) Tim van Rijthoven def. (Czech Republic) Marek Gengel / (Czech Republic) Tomáš Macháč 6–7^{(2–7)}, 7–5, [10–3].
