= 2021 Open de Rennes – Doubles =

Doubles
- 2021 Open de Rennes

Final
- Champions: (Netherlands) Bart Stevens (Netherlands) Tim van Rijthoven
- Runners-up: (Czech Republic) Marek Gengel (Czech Republic) Tomáš Macháč
- Score: 6–7^{(2–7)}, 7–5, [10–3]

Events
| Singles | Doubles |
- Open de Rennes

Antonio Šančić and Tristan-Samuel Weissborn were the defending champions but chose not to defend their title.

Bart Stevens and Tim van Rijthoven won the title after defeating Marek Gengel and Tomáš Macháč 6–7^{(2–7)}, 7–5, [10–3] in the final.

== Seeds ==
1. (Netherlands) David Pel / (Pakistan) Aisam-ul-Haq Qureshi (quarterfinals)
2. (Monaco) Hugo Nys / (France) Arthur Rinderknech (first round)
3. (France) Manuel Guinard / (France) Albano Olivetti (first round)
4. (India) Jeevan Nedunchezhiyan / (India) Purav Raja (semifinals)

== Draw ==
Key

- Q = Qualifier
- WC = Wild card
- LL = Lucky loser
- Alt = Alternate
- ITF = ITF entry
- PR = Protected ranking
- SR = Special ranking
- SE = Special exempt
- JE = Junior exempt
- JR = Junior Accelerator Programme entrant
- CO = College Accelerator Programme entrant
- NG = Next Gen Accelerator Program entrant
- w/o = Walkover
- r = Retired
- d = Defaulted

First round
(Czech Republic) M Gengel (Czech Republic) T Macháč | 6^{5} | 6 | [10]
(Germany) T Kamke (Germany) Y Maden | 7^{7} | 2 | [8]
3 | (France) M Guinard (France) A Olivetti | 7 | 3 | [7]
(France) T Lamasine (France) G Simon | 5 | 6 | [10]
(Japan) T Matsui (Japan) K Uesugi | 1 | 6^{4}
(India) A Kadhe (Canada) B Schnur | 6 | 7^{7}
(United Kingdom) L Broady (Ukraine) S Stakhovsky
(Russia) T Gabashvili (France) M Janvier | w/o
(France) K Jacquet (France) H Mayot | 4 | 5
4 | (India) J Nedunchezhiyan (India) P Raja | 6 | 7
(Netherlands) M Hermans (Netherlands) G Smits | 6 | 6
(India) A Chandrasekar (Italy) Davide Pozzi | 1 | 3
(Netherlands) B Stevens (Netherlands) T van Rijthoven | 1 | 7 | [10]
2 | (Monaco) H Nys (France) A Rinderknech | 6 | 5 | [8]

Quarterfinals
1 | (Netherlands) D Pel (Pakistan) A-u-H Qureshi | 6^{2} | 6^{3}
(Czech Republic) M Gengel (Czech Republic) T Macháč | 7^{7} | 7^{7}
(France) T Lamasine (France) G Simon | 6 | 6
(India) A Kadhe (Canada) B Schnur | 0 | 4
(Russia) T Gabashvili (France) M Janvier | 6 | 1 | [5]
4 | (India) J Nedunchezhiyan (India) P Raja | 3 | 6 | [10]
(Netherlands) M Hermans (Netherlands) G Smits | 3 | 2
(Netherlands) B Stevens (Netherlands) T van Rijthoven | 6 | 6

Semifinals
(Czech Republic) M Gengel (Czech Republic) T Macháč | 7^{7} | 6
(France) T Lamasine (France) G Simon | 6^{5} | 1
4 | (India) J Nedunchezhiyan (India) P Raja | 6 | 6^{7} | [8]
(Netherlands) B Stevens (Netherlands) T van Rijthoven | 4 | 7^{9} | [10]

Final
(Czech Republic) M Gengel (Czech Republic) T Macháč | 7^{7} | 5 | [3]
(Netherlands) B Stevens (Netherlands) T van Rijthoven | 6^{2} | 7 | [10]
