= 2022 Open de Rennes – Singles =

Singles
- 2022 Open de Rennes

Final
- Champion: (France) Ugo Humbert
- Runner-up: (Austria) Dominic Thiem
- Score: 6–3, 6–0

Events
Singles	Doubles
← 2021 ·	Open de Rennes	· 2023 →

Benjamin Bonzi was the defending champion but chose not to defend his title.

Ugo Humbert won the title after defeating Dominic Thiem 6–3, 6–0 in the final.

== Seeds ==
1. (France) Hugo Gaston (semifinals)
2. (Germany) Peter Gojowczyk (semifinals)
3. (France) Hugo Grenier (second round)
4. (France) Ugo Humbert (champion)
5. (United Kingdom) Ryan Peniston (second round)
6. (France) Grégoire Barrère (quarterfinals)
7. (France) Benoît Paire (quarterfinals)
8. (Netherlands) Gijs Brouwer (quarterfinals)

== Draw ==
=== Key ===
- Q = Qualifier
- WC = Wild card
- LL = Lucky loser
- Alt = Alternate
- SE = Special exempt
- PR = Protected ranking
- ITF = ITF entry
- JE = Junior exempt
- w/o = Walkover
- r = Retired
- d = Defaulted
- SR = Special ranking

=== Finals ===
Semifinals
1	(France) Hugo Gaston	2	5
WC	(Austria) Dominic Thiem	6	7
4	(France) Ugo Humbert	6	6
2	(Germany) Peter Gojowczyk	3	4

Final
WC	(Austria) Dominic Thiem	3	0
4	(France) Ugo Humbert	6	6

=== Top half ===
First round
1	(France) H Gaston	7	6
Q	(Belgium) Y Mertens	5	4
WC	(France) G Debru	4	6	6
(Germany) M Rosenkranz	6	3	4
Q	(Germany) M Topo	6	6^{5}	3
(France) C Tabur	1	7^{7}	6
(France) D Added	6^{3}	6	5
7	(France) B Paire	7^{7}	4	7
3	(France) H Grenier	6	6
Q	(France) Maxime Mora	2	2
(Bulgaria) A Andreev	3	7^{7}	7^{7}
(France) M Janvier	6	6^{5}	6^{1}
WC	(Austria) D Thiem	4	6	6
(France) G Simon	6	3	2
(France) A Escoffier	3	6^{5}
5	(United Kingdom) R Peniston	6	7^{7}

Second round
1	(France) H Gaston	6	4	6
WC	(France) G Debru	2	6	3
(France) C Tabur	3	3
7	(France) B Paire	6	6
3	(France) H Grenier	6	3	6^{4}
(Bulgaria) A Andreev	4	6	7^{7}
WC	(Austria) D Thiem	6	6
5	(United Kingdom) R Peniston	3	4

Quarterfinals
1	(France) H Gaston	6	6
7	(France) B Paire	3	1
(Bulgaria) A Andreev	6	3	2
WC	(Austria) D Thiem	3	6	6

Semifinals
1	(France) H Gaston	2	5
WC	(Austria) D Thiem	6	7

=== Bottom half ===
First round
8	(Netherlands) G Brouwer	6^{3}	6	6
Q	(Germany) MH Rehberg	7^{7}	4	4
WC	(France) C Chidekh	6	5	6
(Brazil) G Décamps	2	7	1
(Switzerland) A Bellier	6	6
A Vatutin	4	4
Q	(Sweden) K Friberg	3	4
4	(France) U Humbert	6	6
6	(France) G Barrère	6	6
(Japan) H Moriya	3	2
(France) E Furness	7^{7}	6
Q	(Sweden) F Bergevi	6^{3}	2
(Germany) D Masur	6^{9}	6	6
(Belgium) J De Loore	7^{11}	2	4
(France) K de Schepper	7^{7}	3	2
2	(Germany) P Gojowczyk	6^{4}	6	6

Second round
8	(Netherlands) G Brouwer	7	3	6
WC	(France) C Chidekh	5	6	3
(Switzerland) A Bellier	4	1
4	(France) U Humbert	6	6
6	(France) G Barrère	7^{7}	6
(France) E Furness	6^{2}	4
(Germany) D Masur	6	3	5
2	(Germany) P Gojowczyk	2	6	7

Quarterfinals
8	(Netherlands) G Brouwer	1	6^{5}
4	(France) U Humbert	6	7^{7}
6	(France) G Barrère	6^{2}	6	5
2	(Germany) P Gojowczyk	7^{7}	4	7

Semifinals
4	(France) U Humbert	6	6
2	(Germany) P Gojowczyk	3	4
