= Tim van Rijthoven =

Dutch tennis player (born 1997)

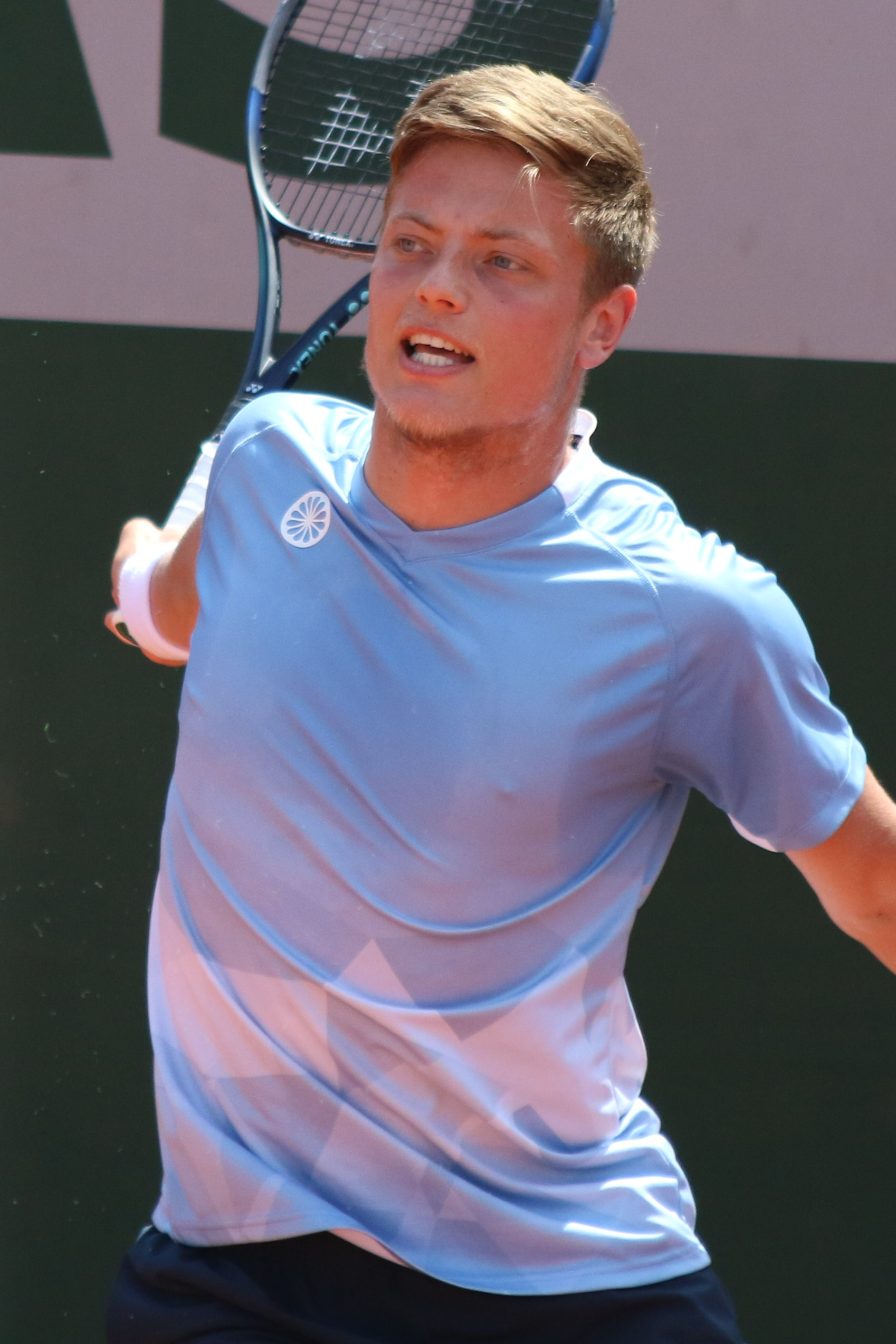
- Van Rijthoven at the 2022 French Open
- Country (sports): Netherlands
- Residence: Amstelveen, Netherlands
- Born: 24 April 1997 (age 29) Roosendaal, Netherlands
- Height: 1.88 m (6 ft 2 in)
- Turned pro: 2015
- Retired: 8 July 2025
- Plays: Right-handed (one-handed backhand)
- Coach: Jean-Baptiste Blanc (2007–15); Richard Krajicek (2017–18); Paul Haarhuis; Igor Sijsling (2022–2025)
- Prize money: US $838,736

Singles
- Career record: 12–11
- Career titles: 1
- Highest ranking: No. 101 (18 July 2022)

Grand Slam singles results
- Australian Open: Q2 (2022)
- French Open: Q3 (2022)
- Wimbledon: 4R (2022)
- US Open: 2R (2022)

Doubles
- Career record: 1–2
- Career titles: 0
- Highest ranking: No. 225 (9 May 2022)

Team competitions
- Davis Cup: 2–1
- Last updated on: 7 July 2025.

Tim van Rijthoven (Dutch pronunciation: [ˈtɪɱ vɑn ˈrɛitɦoːvə(n)]; born 24 April 1997) is a Dutch former professional tennis player. He achieved a career-high ATP singles ranking of world No. 101 on 18 July 2022 and a best doubles ranking of No. 225, achieved on 9 May 2022. In June 2022, he claimed his first five ATP Tour wins (including over world No. 2 Daniil Medvedev) en route to his maiden Rosmalen Grass Court Championships title.

As a junior, he reached a combined ITF ranking of world No. 13 in 2015 and reached the quarterfinals of the 2014 Wimbledon Championships boys' singles tournament and semifinals of the boys' doubles.

Van Rijthoven has represented Netherlands at the Davis Cup where he has a W/L record of 2–1.

== Professional career ==
=== 2016-2019: ATP debut and top 300 ===
In 2016 he made his debut on the ATP World Tour by qualifying as a lucky loser for the Winston-Salem Open after Thanasi Kokkinakis withdrew due to a recurring shoulder injury, where he lost to Jiří Veselý in the first round. Van Rijthoven described the match as "a great experience".

=== 2022: Maiden ATP title with win over World No. 2, Major debut and fourth round, top 105 ===
He made his top 250 debut in doubles on 17 January 2022 after a quarterfinal in Challenger in Traralgon, Australia partnering with Nino Serdarušić. He made his top 200 debut in singles on 21 February 2022 after reaching his second singles Challenger final as a qualifier in Forli, Italy. At the same tournament, seeded third, he reached the quarterfinals in doubles with Robin Haase and improved his doubles ranking to No. 235.

Ranked No. 205 on his debut at the 2022 Libéma Open as a wildcard, he defeated Matthew Ebden and world No. 14 and third seed Taylor Fritz to reach the quarterfinals for the first time in his career. Next, he beat Hugo Gaston in straight sets to reach his first semifinal. There, he won against a top 10 player for the first time in his career by upsetting world No. 9 and second seed Félix Auger-Aliassime in the semifinals. Van Rijthoven pulled off another upset by defeating world no. 2 and top seed Daniil Medvedev in straight sets in the final, becoming the lowest ranked player to win an ATP title in 2022, the lowest-ranked player to win a title since the 335th-ranked Juan Manuel Cerúndolo in 2021 Córdoba and the first Dutchman to win the ATP 250 event since Sjeng Schalken in 2003. He moved to just outside the top 100 at World No. 106 on 13 June 2022 climbing 99 positions up in the rankings.

As a result of his title run, van Rijthoven received a wildcard into Wimbledon where he made his Grand Slam debut. On his Major debut he won his first Grand Slam match at Wimbledon in three straight sets defeating Federico Delbonis. In the second round he defeated 15th seed Reilly Opelka, then in the third round, he defeated 22nd seed Nikoloz Basilashvili to advance to the fourth round of a major on his debut, becoming the seventh ATP player to achieve that feat since 2000 and only the third player in the past two years to do so after Aslan Karatsev and Lorenzo Musetti, as well as the first wildcard since Nick Kyrgios to reach the fourth round of Wimbledon. In the round of 16, he lost to the top seed and eventual champion, Novak Djokovic in four sets.

Due to a back injury sustained in Indianapolis, van Rijthoven did not play any tournaments until his debut at the US Open. He beat qualifier Zhang Zhizhen in the first round, saving 7 match points in the third set. He was beaten by 5th seed and eventual runner up, Casper Ruud, in the second round.

=== 2023-2025: Loss of form, hiatus, return to the ATP Tour, retirement ===
He reached the second round at the 2023 Maharashtra Open.

He played his last match of the season in February at his home tournament the 2023 ABN AMRO Open as a wildcard where he lost to Maxime Cressy. Due to not being able to defend his title at the 2023 Libéma Open he fell out of the top 350 to No. 390 on 12 June 2023.

In early June 2024 it was announced that Van Rijtoven had received a wildcard and would return to the grass at 2024 Libéma Open where he had won the tournament as a wildcard 2 years ago. He lost to Zizou Bergs in the first round.

In July 2025, Tim Van Rijtoven announced his retirement from professional tennis due to a persistent elbow injury.

== Singles performance timeline ==
Key
W	F	SF	QF	#R	RR	Q#	P#	DNQ	A	Z#	PO	G	S	B	NMS	NTI	P	NH

(W) winner; (F) finalist; (SF) semifinalist; (QF) quarterfinalist; (#R) rounds 4, 3, 2, 1; (RR) round-robin stage; (Q#) qualification round; (DNQ) did not qualify; (A) absent; (NH) not held; (SR) strike rate (events won / competed); (W–L) win–loss record.
To avoid confusion and double counting, these charts are updated at the conclusion of a tournament or when the player's participation has ended.

Tournament	2015	2016	2017	2018	2019	2020	2021	2022	2023	2024	2025	SR	W–L
Grand Slam tournaments
Australian Open	A	A	A	A	A	A	A	Q2	Q1	A	Q1	0 / 0	0–0
French Open	A	A	A	A	A	A	A	Q3	A	A	Q1	0 / 0	0–0
Wimbledon	A	A	A	A	A	NH	A	4R	A	Q1	A	0 / 1	3–1
US Open	A	A	A	A	A	A	A	2R	A	Q1	A	0 / 1	1–1
Win–loss	0–0	0–0	0–0	0–0	0–0	0–0	0–0	4–2	0–0	0–0	0–0	0 / 2	4–2
National representation
Davis Cup	PO	Z1	A	A	A	A	A	A	QR	A	A	0 / 0	3–1
Career statistics
Tournaments	0	1	0	0	0	0	0	7	2	1	0	11	
Titles	0	0	0	0	0	0	0	1	0	0	0	1	
Finals	0	0	0	0	0	0	0	1	0	0	0	1	
Overall win–loss	0–1	1–1	0–0	0–0	0–0	0–0	0–0	9–6	2–2	0–1	0–1	12–11	
Year-end ranking	591	381	NR	412	291	344	261	115	874	NR	NR		

== ATP Tour finals ==
=== Singles: 1 (title) ===
Legend Grand Slam (0–0) ATP 1000 (0–0) ATP 500 (0–0) ATP 250 (1–0)	Finals by surface Hard (0–0) Clay (0–0) Grass (1–0)	Finals by setting Outdoor (1–0) Indoor (0–0)

Result	W–L	Date	Tournament	Tier	Surface	Opponent	Score
Win	1–0	Jun 2022	Rosmalen Championships, Netherlands	ATP 250	Grass	Daniil Medvedev	6–4, 6–1

== ATP Challenger and ITF Futures/World Tennis Tour finals ==
=== Singles: 15 (8 titles, 7 runner-ups) ===
Legend ATP Challenger Tour (0–2) ITF Futures/WTT (8–5)	Finals by surface Hard (6–6) Clay (2–1) Grass (0–0) Carpet (0–0)

Result	W–L	Date	Tournament	Tier	Surface	Opponent	Score
Win	1–0	Oct 2015	Turkey F40, Antalya	Futures	Hard	(India) Ramkumar Ramanathan	6–3, 4–6, 6–4
Loss	1–1	Nov 2015	Greece F10, Heraklion	Futures	Hard	(United States) Eric James Johnson	4–6, 6–4, 4–6
Win	2–1	Nov 2015	Greece F11, Heraklion	Futures	Hard	(United States) Gonzales Austin	4–6, 6–3, 7–5
Loss	2–2	Mar 2016	Canada F1, Gatineau	Futures	Hard (i)	(United States) Alex Kuznetsov	5–7, 3–6
Loss	2–3	Apr 2016	Italy F7, Santa Margherita di Pula	Futures	Clay	(France) Laurent Lokoli	3–6, 2–6
Loss	2–4	Sep 2016	Canada F6, Calgary	Futures	Hard	(Canada) Brayden Schnur	3–6, 6–3, 3–6
Win	3–4	Feb 2018	USA F6, Palm Coast	Futures	Clay	(France) Maxime Chazal	6–4, 6–4
Win	4–4	Jul 2018	Netherlands F3, Amstelveen	Futures	Clay	(Netherlands) Sidane Pontjodikromo	6–2, 6–4
Win	5–4	Feb 2019	M25 Barnstaple, United Kingdom	WTT	Hard (i)	(Ukraine) Danylo Kalenichenko	7–6^{(7–5)}, 3–6, 6–1
Loss	5–5	Mar 2019	M15 Manama, Bahrain	WTT	Hard	(Czech Republic) Tomáš Macháč	3–6, 3–6
Win	6–5	Apr 2019	M25 Andijan, Uzbekistan	WTT	Hard	(Russia) Konstantin Kravchuk	6–3, 6–7^{(5–7)}, 6–3
Win	7–5	May 2019	M25 Namangan, Uzbekistan	WTT	Hard	(Russia) Roman Safiullin	6–7^{(5–7)}, 7–5, 6–4
Win	8–5	Mar 2021	M25 Biel/Bienne, Switzerland	WTT	Hard (i)	(Czech Republic) Jiří Lehečka	6–2, 6–1
Loss	0–1	Aug 2021	Segovia, Spain	Challenger	Hard	(France) Benjamin Bonzi	6–7^{(10–12)}, 6–3, 4–6
Loss	0–2	Feb 2022	Forlí IV, Italy	Challenger	Hard (i)	(United Kingdom) Jack Draper	1–6, 2–6

=== Doubles: 4 (3 titles, 1 runner-up) ===
Legend ATP Challenger Tour (3–1) ITF WTT (0–0)	Finals by surface Hard (2–0) Clay (1–1) Grass (0–0) Carpet (0–0)

Result	W–L	Date	Tournament	Tier	Surface	Partner	Opponents	Score
Loss	0–1	Jul 2016	Scheveningen, Netherlands	Challenger	Clay	(Netherlands) Tallon Griekspoor	(Netherlands) Wesley Koolhof (Netherlands) Matwé Middelkoop	1–6, 6–3, [11–13]
Win	1–1	May 2021	Oeiras IV, Portugal	Challenger	Clay	(Netherlands) Jesper de Jong	(Germany) Julian Lenz (Ecuador) Roberto Quiroz	6–1, 7–6^{(7–3)}
Win	2–1	Jul 2021	Pozoblanco, Spain	Challenger	Hard	(Netherlands) Igor Sijsling	(Ecuador) Diego Hidalgo (Spain) Sergio Martos Gornés	5–7, 7–6^{(7–4)}, [10–5]
Win	3–1	Sep 2021	Rennes, France	Challenger	Hard (i)	(Netherlands) Bart Stevens	(Czech Republic) Marek Gengel (Czech Republic) Tomáš Macháč	6–7^{(2–7)}, 7–5, [10–3]

== Record against other players ==
=== Record against top-10 players ===
Van Rijthoven's record against players who have been ranked in the top 10, with those who are active in boldface. Only ATP Tour main draw matches are considered:

Player	Record	Win %	Hard	Clay	Grass	Last match
Number 1 ranked players						
(Russia) **Daniil Medvedev**	1–0	100%	–	–	1–0	Won (6–4, 6–1) at 2022 's-Hertogenbosch
(Serbia) **Novak Djokovic**	0–1	0%	–	–	0–1	Lost (2–6, 6–4, 1–6, 2–6) at 2022 Wimbledon Championships
Number 2 ranked players						
(Norway) **Casper Ruud**	0–1	0%	0–1	–	–	Lost (7–6^{(7–4)}, 4–6, 4–6, 4–6) at 2022 US Open
Number 4 ranked players						
(United States) **Taylor Fritz**	1–0	100%	–	–	1–0	Won (6–7^{(9–11)}, 7–5, 6–4) at 2022 's-Hertogenbosch
(Denmark) **Holger Rune**	0–1	0%	0–1	–	–	Lost (6–7^{(2–7)}, 6–7^{(6–8)}) at 2022 Sofia
Number 6 ranked players						
(Canada) **Félix Auger-Aliassime**	1–0	100%	–	–	1–0	Won (6–3, 1–6, 7–6^{(7–5)}) at 2022 's-Hertogenbosch
**Total**	**3–3**	**50%**	**0–2** **(0%)**	**0–0** **( – )**	**3–1** **(75%)**	* Statistics correct as of 1 January 2025

=== Record against players ranked No. 11–20 ===
Active players are in boldface.

- (United States) **Reilly Opelka** 1–0
- (Georgia (country)) **Nikoloz Basilashvili** 1–0

*As of 1 January 2025

=== Wins over top-10 players ===
- He has a 2–1 record against players who were, at the time the match was played, ranked in the top 10.

Season	2022	Total
Wins	2	**2**

#	Player	Rank	Event	Surface	Rd	Score	TvRR
**2022**
1.	(Canada) Félix Auger-Aliassime	9	's-Hertogenbosch, Netherlands	Grass	SF	6–3, 1–6, 7–6^{(7–5)}	205
2.	Daniil Medvedev	2	's-Hertogenbosch, Netherlands	Grass	F	6–4, 6–1	205

*As of 3 July 2022
