= I formation (disambiguation) =

I formation or I-formation may refer to:

- I formation, an offensive player lineup in American football
- I-formation (tennis), a player positioning strategy in doubles
- I-formation (pickleball), a player positioning strategy in doubles
