= Krejčíková–Siniaková doubles team =

Czech tennis partnership

Barbora Krejčíková / Kateřina Siniaková
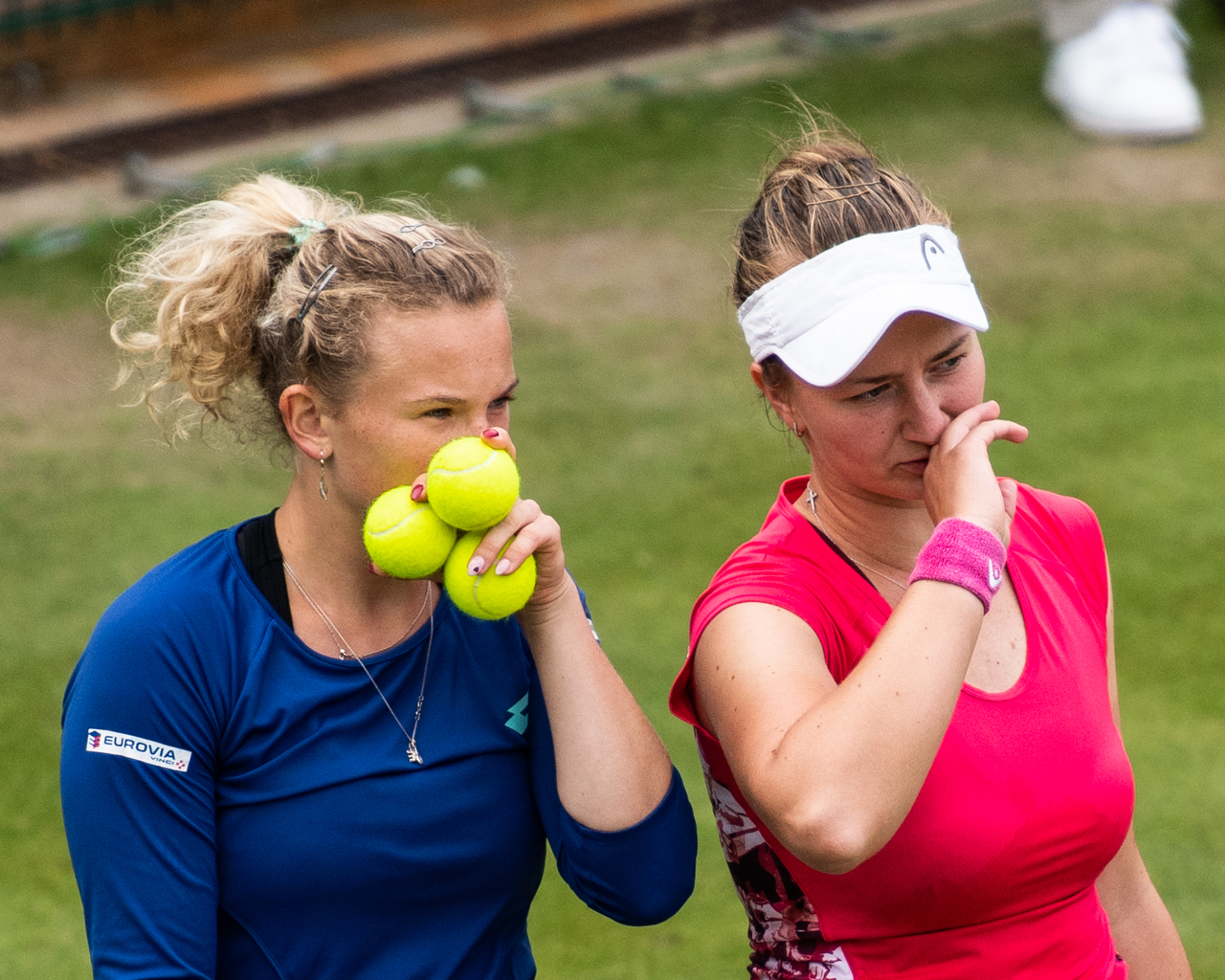
- Siniaková and Krejčíková at the 2018 Birmingham Classic
- Country (sports): Czech Republic

Doubles
- Career record: 173–57
- Career titles: 16
- Highest ranking: No. 1 (22 October 2018)

Grand Slam doubles results
- Australian Open: W (2022, 2023)
- French Open: W (2018, 2021)
- Wimbledon: W (2018, 2022)
- US Open: W (2022)

Other doubles tournaments
- Tour Finals: W (2021)
- Olympic Games: (2020)
- Fed Cup: W (2018)
Medal record
Representing Czech Republic
Women's Tennis
Gold medal – first place	2020 Tokyo	Doubles
- Last updated on: 12 November 2023.

Czech tennis players Barbora Krejčíková and Kateřina Siniaková formed a successful doubles partnership from 2013 to 2023. They won seven major tournaments and ten other Women's Tennis Association (WTA) titles. With wins at the 2020 Olympics and the 2021 WTA Finals, they are the only women's doubles team to complete the career Super Slam together. They finished three years ranked No. 1 in doubles.

== History ==
=== 2013–2017: Junior success and early professional years ===
In 2013, Krejčíková and Siniaková, both aged 17, won three of the year's four junior Grand Slam doubles tournaments. (Note: By reaching the 2013 Australian Open final with Oleksandra Korashvili, Krejčíková was one match win away from completing a calendar-year Grand Slam.) They were paired together when each of them "couldn't find a partner" for doubles at the French Open, and went on to win the event without dropping a set. A month later, they repeated the feat at Wimbledon, and they completed their junior careers with the same result at the US Open. Including two other tournament wins, this stretched their team win–loss record at junior events to 24–0 (48–0 in sets). Siniaková and Krejčíková had peak junior International Tennis Federation (ITF) rankings of No. 2 and No. 3 respectively.

Following their junior triumphs, the team played intermittently from 2014 to 2017. Siniaková was the first to establish herself on the WTA Tour, cracking the top 50 in singles in 2016, while Krejčíková initially struggled, not reaching the top 100 in singles until 2020. This gap in rankings sometimes made it difficult for them to enter the same tournaments, but they did manage to play at several events together in 2016. At the French Open, on the way to their first major women's doubles semifinal, they beat the team of Martina Hingis and Sania Mirza that was attempting to finish a non-calendar-year Grand Slam. They additionally reached the quarterfinals of the US Open. (Note: Siniaková and Krejčíková played against each other in doubles at the 2017 French Open. Siniaková and Lucie Hradecká beat Krejčíková and Chan Hao-ching.)

=== 2018–2020: first Grand Slam titles, Fed Cup win, No. 1 ranking ===
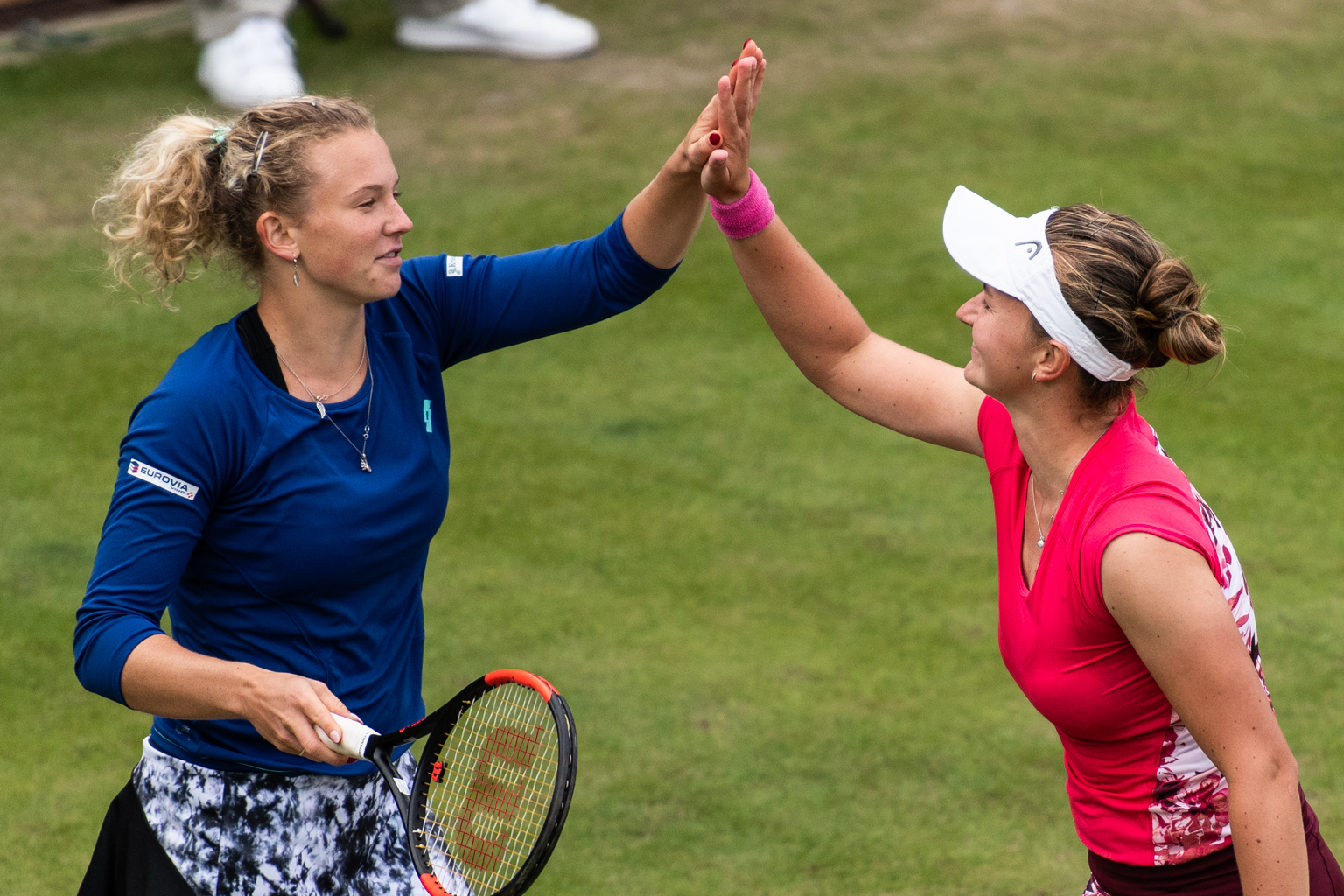
Siniaková and Krejčíková in 2018

After a break of more than a year, Krejčíková and Siniaková reunited in 2018. Early that year, they reached their first two WTA Tour doubles finals as a pair in Shenzhen and Miami. (Note: Both players had previously reached and won doubles finals on the WTA Tour, but with other partners. Siniaková even reached a major final, partnering Lucie Hradecká, at the 2017 US Open.) In the summer, they reached and won their first Grand Slam finals together: At the French Open, they beat the Japanese pair Eri Hozumi/Makoto Ninomiya in a quick straight-set final, and in the Wimbledon final, they outlasted Nicole Melichar/Květa Peschke 6–4, 4–6, 6–0. These wins made Krejčíková/Siniaková the first doubles team to complete the Channel Slam since Kim Clijsters/Ai Sugiyama in 2003. The pair nearly replicated their junior triple as the top-seeded team at the US Open, but lost in the semifinals to eventual champions Ashleigh Barty/CoCo Vandeweghe. Krejčíková and Siniaková were the first team in 2019 to qualify for the season-ending WTA Finals, where on their debut in October they finished runners-up to Tímea Babos and Kristina Mladenovic. Shortly before season's end, the team jointly attained the No. 1 ranking for the first time on 22 October 2018. Additionally, they were named the WTA Doubles Team of the Year.

The next year, Krejčíková and Siniaková qualified for the WTA Finals for a second straight year but did not win any major titles in 2019. They won two tournaments this year, the Rogers Cup in Canada and the Linz Open in Austria. Elise Mertens and Aryna Sabalenka beat them 6–3, 6–2 in the Indian Wells final. At the majors, the Czechs lost in the quarterfinals of the Australian Open to eventual champions Samantha Stosur/Zhang Shuai; as defending champions and top seeds, they lost in the first round of the French Open; and they reached the semifinals of Wimbledon, where they lost to Gabriela Dabrowski/Xu Yifan. They fell in round-robin play at the WTA Finals.

In the 2020 season disrupted by the COVID-19 pandemic, Krejčíková and Siniaková reached at least the semifinals of all six events they entered together. Their only title this year came at the Shenzhen Open. In major play, the team's run to the Australian Open semifinals was ended by No. 1 seeds Hsieh Su-wei/Barbora Strýcová, and they lost the French Open semifinal to eventual champions Babos/Mladenovic. The WTA Finals were cancelled this year.

=== 2021–2023: return to No. 1, Olympic gold, career Grand Slam ===
In a "resurgent" season in 2021, Krejčíková and Siniaková won multiple important titles. In February, they started strong by taking home the Gippsland Trophy in Australia and finishing runners-up at the Australian Open to Mertens/Sabalenka. While they lost in the early rounds of several spring hardcourt events, on the clay in Madrid they won the doubles title over Dabrowski and Demi Schuurs 6–4, 6–3. In June, Krejčíková turned in a historic performance at 2021 French Open, becoming the first player to win the tournament in singles and doubles simultaneously since Mary Pierce in 2000. This event, in which Krejčíková saved a match point, marked her rise to prominence in singles. In the doubles final, she and Siniaková beat No. 14 seeds Bethanie Mattek-Sands/Iga Świątek 6–4, 6–2. In the quarterfinals of Wimbledon, the pair fell to Veronika Kudermetova and Elena Vesnina 6–7^{(6–8)}, 6–4, 9–7, despite having four match points for themselves. The Czechs were seeded No. 1 at the Tokyo Olympics in July–August; they won three super tiebreaks (including over Kudermetova/Vesnina) en route to the gold medal match, in which they beat the Swiss team Belinda Bencic/Viktorija Golubic 7–5, 6–1. They were also top-seeded at and won the 2021 WTA Finals, where they twice beat Hsieh/Mertens (in the group stage and final), and Siniaková retook the No. 1 ranking. The pair was named the WTA Doubles Team of the Year for the second time.

Krejčíková and Siniaková went undefeated (18–0) at the majors in 2022, winning all three Grand Slams that they entered. At the Australian Open, they won their fourth major by beating Anna Danilina and Beatriz Haddad Maia in a close final, 6–7^{(3–7)}, 6–4, 6–4. They were unable to defend their French Open title because Krejčíková had to pull out of the doubles draw after testing positive for COVID-19. As No. 2 seeds at Wimbledon, they beat top-seeded Mertens/Zhang in the final 6–2, 6–4. In September, their victory at the US Open completed their career Grand Slam; in the final against the unseeded pair of Caty McNally and Taylor Townsend, the Czechs were down a set and 1–4 before rallying—Siniaková said "we calmed down a little"—to win 3–6, 7–5, 6–1. They again reached the final of the WTA Finals, but lost 6–2, 4–6, [11–9] to Mertens/Kudermetova, despite leading 7–2 at one point in the deciding tiebreak. They were again named WTA Doubles Team of the Year.

The team continued playing well at the start of 2023, making their first ever title defense at the Australian Open, beating Shuko Aoyama/Ena Shibahara in the final 6–4, 6–3. This was their seventh Grand Slam title and stretched their major win streak to 24 matches. They continued their perfect record on the year at Indian Wells, winning the final in a super tiebreak 10–7 over Beatriz Haddad Maia/Laura Siegemund. The team struggled with injuries in the following months, withdrawing from Miami (Siniaková's right wrist) and Wimbledon (Krejčíková's left leg) and losing in early rounds of tournaments from the French to the US Open. They returned to form in September with their first title in six months at the San Diego Open (where Krejčíková also won in singles). They did not make it out of the group stage at the WTA Finals. The next week, representing the Czech Republic at the Billie Jean King Cup finals, they won a group-deciding match against the United States, but fell in the deciding match to eventual champions Canada in the semifinals.

On 11 November 2023, hours after the Billie Jean King Cup finals loss, Siniaková said she decided the team was not going to play together in the 2024 season, but did not rule out reuniting at some point such as for the 2024 Summer Olympics. Her new doubles partner became Storm Hunter.

=== 2024: Prague Open title and Paris Olympics ===
Krejčíková and Siniaková reunited at the 2024 Prague Open in July, winning their first title together on home soil by defeating wild cards Bethanie Mattek-Sands and Lucie Šafářová in the final. They also teamed up at the 2024 Summer Olympics, losing in the quarterfinals to Mirra Andreeva and Diana Shnaider.

== Playing style ==
Krejčíková and Siniaková communicate very well on court thanks to their many years playing together. Their skills include quick reflexes at the net (especially Siniaková), smart hitting from the baseline (especially Krejčíková), and lobbing ability. The team often uses an I-formation, with the net player crouching at the center of the court before the service.

The contrast of the players' personalities has been noted since their first year together. Krejčíková is considered the less excitable one; she once referred to Siniaková as "my wilder half".

== Performance timeline ==
Key
W	F	SF	QF	#R	RR	Q#	P#	DNQ	A	Z#	PO	G	S	B	NMS	NTI	P	NH

(W) winner; (F) finalist; (SF) semifinalist; (QF) quarterfinalist; (#R) rounds 4, 3, 2, 1; (RR) round-robin stage; (Q#) qualification round; (P#) preliminary round; (DNQ) did not qualify; (A) absent; (Z#) Davis/Fed Cup Zonal Group (with number indication) or (PO) play-off; (G) gold, (S) silver or (B) bronze Olympic/Paralympic medal; (NMS) not a Masters tournament; (NTI) not a Tier I tournament; (P) postponed; (NH) not held; (SR) strike rate (events won / competed); (W–L) win–loss record.
To avoid confusion and double counting, these charts are updated at the conclusion of a tournament or when the player's participation has ended.

Current as of 2023 Billie Jean King Cup finals.

A Indicates players participated with different partners.

Tournament	2014	2015	2016	2017	2018	2019	2020	2021	2022	2023	SR	W–L	Win%
Grand Slam tournaments
Australian Open	A	A	A	A	3R	QF	SF	F	W	W	2 / 6	26–4	87%
French Open	A	A	SF	A	W	1R	SF	W	A	1R	2 / 6	20–4	83%
Wimbledon	A	A	1R	A	W	SF	NH	QF	W	A	2 / 5	17–3	85%
US Open	A	A	QF	A	SF	A	A	1R	W	2R	1 / 5	14–4	78%
Win–loss	0–0	0–0	7–3	0–0	18–2	7–3	8–2	12–3	18–0	7–2	7 / 22	77–15	84%
Year-end championships
WTA Finals	DNQ				F	RR	NH	W	F	RR	1 / 5	13–6	68%
National representation
Summer Olympics	NH		A	NH				G	NH		1 / 1	5–0	100%
Billie Jean King Cup	A	A	A	A	W (Note: Dead rubber match not contested)	1R	A			SF	1 / 3	2–2	50%
WTA 1000
Dubai / Qatar Open	A	A	A	A	SF	A	SF	QF	QF	A	0 / 4	7–4	64%
Indian Wells Open	A	A	A	A	2R	F	A	QF	A	W	1 / 4	12–3	80%
Miami Open	A	A	A	A	F	1R	A	2R	A	A	0 / 3	5–3	63%
Madrid Open	A	A	A	A	2R	QF	A	W	A	A	1 / 3	6–2	75%
Italian Open	A	A	A	A	1R	SF	A	QF	A	A	0 / 3	4–3	57%
Canadian Open	A	A	A	A	2R	W	A	A	A	A	1 / 2	3–1	75%
Cincinnati Open	A	A	A	A	QF	QF	A	SF	2R	QF	0 / 5	4–5	44%
Wuhan Open	A	A	A	A	A	A	NH				0 / 0	0–0	–
China Open	A	A	A	A	A	A	NH			2R	0 / 1	0–1	0%
Guadalajara Open	NH								SF	A	0 / 1	2–1	67%
Career statistics
Tournaments	2014	2015	2016	2017	2018	2019	2020	2021	2022	2023	SR	W–L	Win%
Tournaments	1	0	5	1	15	13	6	14	8	10	Career total: 73		
Titles	0	0	0	0	2	2	1	5	3	3	Career total: 16		
Finals	0	0	0	0	5	3	1	6	4	3	Career total: 22		
Hard win–loss	0–0	0–0	3–1	2–1	20–9	17–8	12–2	27–7	21–4	20–7	–	122–39	76%
Clay win–loss	0–1	0–0	5–3	0–0	7–3	3–3	6–2	11–1	0–0	0–1	–	32–14	70%
Grass win–loss	0–0	0–0	0–1	0–0	8–1	4–1	0–0	1–1	6–0	0–0	–	19–4	83%
Overall win–loss	0–1	0–0	8–5	2–1	35–13	24–12	18–4	39–9	27–4	20–8	–	173–57	75%
Win (%)	0%	–	62%	67%	73%	67%	82%	81%	87%	71%	Career total: 75.22%		
Year-end ranking (B) (Note: Year-end ranking of Barbora Krejčíková)	121	87	26	54	1	13	7	2	3	13	Career highest: 1		
Year-end ranking (K) (Note: Year-end ranking of Kateřina Siniaková)	86	58	35	13	1	7	8	1	1	10	Career highest: 1		
Year-end ranking (P) (Note: Year-end ranking as a pair)	n/a				1	6	3	1	1	4	Career highest: 1		

== List of finals ==
=== WTA Tour finals ===
==== Doubles: 24 (18 titles, 6 runner–ups) ====
Legend Grand Slam (7–1) Olympics (1–0) WTA Finals (1–2) WTA 1000 (3–2) WTA 500 (3–0) WTA 250 (4–1)	Finals by surface Hard (12–6) Clay (4–0) Grass (2–0) Carpet

Result	W–L	Date	Tournament	Tier	Surface	Opponents	Score
Loss	0–1	Jan 2018	Shenzhen Open, China	International (Note: The WTA International tournaments were reclassified as WTA 250 tournaments in 2021.)	Hard	(Romania) Simona Halep (Romania) Irina-Camelia Begu	6–1, 1–6, [8–10]
Loss	0–2	Apr 2018	Miami Open, U.S.	Premier M (Note: The WTA Premier 5 & Mandatory tournaments were reclassified as WTA 1000 tournaments in 2021.)	Hard	(Australia) Ashleigh Barty (United States) CoCo Vandeweghe	2–6, 1–6
Win	1–2	Jun 2018	French Open, France	Grand Slam	Clay	(Japan) Eri Hozumi (Japan) Makoto Ninomiya	6–3, 6–3
Win	2–2	Jul 2018	Wimbledon, UK	Grand Slam	Grass	(United States) Nicole Melichar (Czech Republic) Květa Peschke	6–4, 4–6, 6–0
Loss	2–3	Oct 2018	WTA Finals, Singapore	Finals	Hard (i)	(Hungary) Tímea Babos (France) Kristina Mladenovic	4–6, 5–7
Loss	2–4	Mar 2019	Indian Wells Open, U.S.	Premier M	Hard	(Belgium) Elise Mertens (Belarus) Aryna Sabalenka	3–6, 2–6
Win	3–4	Aug 2019	Canadian Open, Canada	Premier 5	Hard	(Germany) Anna-Lena Grönefeld (Netherlands) Demi Schuurs	7–5, 6–0
Win	4–4	Oct 2019	Ladies Linz, Austria	International	Hard (i)	(Austria) Barbara Haas (Switzerland) Xenia Knoll	6–4, 6–3
Win	5–4	Jan 2020	Shenzhen Open, China	International	Hard	(China) Zheng Saisai (China) Duan Yingying	6–2, 3–6, [10–4]
Win	6–4	Feb 2021	Gippsland Trophy, Australia	WTA 500	Hard	(Chinese Taipei) Chan Hao-ching (Chinese Taipei) Latisha Chan	6–3, 7–6^{(7–4)}
Loss	6–5	Feb 2021	Australian Open, Australia	Grand Slam	Hard	(Belgium) Elise Mertens (Belarus) Aryna Sabalenka	2–6, 3–6
Win	7–5	May 2021	Madrid Open, Spain	WTA 1000	Clay	(Canada) Gabriela Dabrowski (Netherlands) Demi Schuurs	6–4, 6–3
Win	8–5	Jun 2021	French Open, France (2)	Grand Slam	Clay	(United States) Bethanie Mattek-Sands (Poland) Iga Świątek	6–4, 6–2
Win	9–5	Aug 2021	Tokyo Olympics, Japan	Olympics	Hard	(Switzerland) Belinda Bencic (Switzerland) Viktorija Golubic	7–5, 6–1
Win	10–5	Nov 2021	WTA Finals, Mexico	WTA Finals	Hard	(Chinese Taipei) Hsieh Su-wei (Belgium) Elise Mertens	6–3, 6–4
Win	11–5	Jan 2022	Australian Open, Australia	Grand Slam	Hard	(Kazakhstan) Anna Danilina (Brazil) Beatriz Haddad Maia	6–7^{(3–7)}, 6–4, 6–4
Win	12–5	Jul 2022	Wimbledon, UK (2)	Grand Slam	Grass	(Belgium) Elise Mertens (China) Zhang Shuai	6–2, 6–4
Win	13–5	Sep 2022	US Open, U.S.	Grand Slam	Hard	(United States) Caty McNally (United States) Taylor Townsend	3–6, 7–5, 6–1
Loss	13–6	Nov 2022	WTA Finals, U.S.	WTA Finals	Hard (i)	Veronika Kudermetova (Belgium) Elise Mertens	2–6, 6–4, [9–11]
Win	14–6	Jan 2023	Australian Open, Australia (2)	Grand Slam	Hard	(Japan) Shuko Aoyama (Japan) Ena Shibahara	6–4, 6–3
Win	15–6	Mar 2023	Indian Wells Open, U.S.	WTA 1000	Hard	(Brazil) Beatriz Haddad Maia (Germany) Laura Siegemund	6–1, 6–7^{(3–7)}, [10–7]
Win	16–6	Sep 2023	San Diego Open, U.S.	WTA 500	Hard	(United States) Danielle Collins (United States) Coco Vandeweghe	6–1, 6–4
Win	17–6	Jul 2024	Prague Open, Czech Republic	WTA 250	Clay	(United States) Bethanie Mattek-Sands (Czech Republic) Lucie Šafářová	6–3, 6–3
Win	18–6	Sep 2025	Korea Open, South Korea	WTA 500	Hard	(Australia) Maya Joint (United States) Caty McNally	6–3, 7–6^{(8–6)}

Note: Tournaments sourced from official WTA archives

== Awards ==
=== WTA Awards ===
- Doubles Team of the Year: 2018, 2021, and 2022

=== ITF World Champions ===
- ITF World Champions: 2018, 2021, and 2022

== See also ==
- List of Grand Slam women's doubles champions
- List of WTA number 1 ranked doubles tennis players
