= 2019 Rogers Cup – Men's singles =

Men's singles
- 2019 Rogers Cup

Final
- Champion: (Spain) Rafael Nadal
- Runner-up: (Russia) Daniil Medvedev
- Score: 6–3, 6–0

Details
- Draw: 56 (7 Q / 4 WC )
- Seeds: 16

Events
Singles	men	women
Doubles	men	women
- Rogers Cup

Defending champion Rafael Nadal defeated Daniil Medvedev in the final, 6–3, 6–0 to win the men's singles tennis title at the 2019 Canadian Open. It marked the first time Nadal successfully defended a hard court title. It was Nadal’s fifth Canadian Open title, after winning in 2005, 2008, 2013, and 2018. This would be his tenth, and last, hard court Masters 1000 title (following three at Indian Wells, one at Cincinnati, and one at Madrid Indoors).

== Seeds ==
The top eight seeds receive a bye into the second round.

1. (Spain) Rafael Nadal (champion)
2. (Austria) Dominic Thiem (quarterfinals)
3. (Germany) Alexander Zverev (quarterfinals)
4. (Greece) Stefanos Tsitsipas (second round)
5. (Japan) Kei Nishikori (second round)
6. (Russia) Karen Khachanov (semifinals)
7. (Italy) Fabio Fognini (quarterfinals)
8. (Russia) Daniil Medvedev (final)
9. (South Africa) Kevin Anderson (withdrew)

10. (Spain) Roberto Bautista Agut (quarterfinals)
11. (Croatia) Borna Ćorić (second round)
12. (United States) John Isner (second round)
13. (Georgia (country)) Nikoloz Basilashvili (third round)
14. (Croatia) Marin Čilić (third round)
15. (Belgium) David Goffin (first round)
16. (France) Gaël Monfils (semifinals, withdrew)
17. (Canada) Milos Raonic (second round, retired due to back injury)

Click on the seed number of a player to go to their draw section.

== Draw ==
Key

- Q = Qualifier
- WC = Wild card
- LL = Lucky loser
- Alt = Alternate
- ITF = ITF entry
- PR = Protected ranking
- SR = Special ranking
- SE = Special exempt
- JE = Junior exempt
- JR = Junior Accelerator Programme entrant
- CO = College Accelerator Programme entrant
- NG = Next Gen Accelerator Program entrant
- w/o = Walkover
- r = Retired
- d = Defaulted

=== Finals ===
Quarterfinals
1	(Spain) Rafael Nadal	2	6	6
7	(Italy) Fabio Fognini	6	1	2
16	(France) Gaël Monfils	6	3	7^{7}
10	(Spain) Roberto Bautista Agut	4	6	6^{2}
6	(Russia) Karen Khachanov	6	6
3	(Germany) Alexander Zverev	3	3
8	(Russia) Daniil Medvedev	6	6
2	(Austria) Dominic Thiem	3	1

Semifinals
1	(Spain) Rafael Nadal	w/o
16	(France) Gaël Monfils
6	(Russia) Karen Khachanov	1	6^{6}
8	(Russia) Daniil Medvedev	6	7^{8}

Final
1	(Spain) Rafael Nadal	6	6
8	(Russia) Daniil Medvedev	3	0

=== Top half ===
==== Section 1 ====
First round
(Australia) A de Minaur	4	6^{6}
Q	(United Kingdom) D Evans	6	7^{8}
(Moldova) R Albot	6	6
(France) G Simon	4	2
(Argentina) G Pella	6	7^{7}
15	(Belgium) D Goffin	4	6^{4}
11	(Croatia) B Ćorić	2	6	7^{7}
SE	(Germany) P Gojowczyk	6	1	6^{2}
(Kazakhstan) M Kukushkin	4	4
(France) A Mannarino	6	6
Q	(United States) T Paul	6	6
WC	(Canada) B Schnur	1	2

Second round
1	(Spain) R Nadal	7^{8}	6
Q	(United Kingdom) D Evans	6^{6}	4
(Moldova) R Albot	3	6	6^{2}
(Argentina) G Pella	6	2	7^{7}
11	(Croatia) B Ćorić	2	1
(France) A Mannarino	6	6
Q	(United States) T Paul	6^{3}	3
7	(Italy) F Fognini	7^{7}	6

Third round
1	(Spain) R Nadal	6	6
(Argentina) G Pella	3	4
(France) A Mannarino	2	5
7	(Italy) F Fognini	6	7

Quarterfinals
1	(Spain) R Nadal	2	6	6
7	(Italy) F Fognini	6	1	2

==== Section 2 ====
First round
Alt	(Poland) H Hurkacz	6	7
(United States) T Fritz	3	5
Q	(Belarus) I Ivashka	7^{7}	6
Q	(South Korea) S-w Kwon	6^{3}	4
WC	(Canada) P Polansky	7^{7}	3	3
16	(France) G Monfils	6^{4}	6	6
10	(Spain) R Bautista Agut	6	6
Q	(Australia) B Tomic	3	2
(Italy) M Cecchinato	6	6^{5}	4
(Argentina) D Schwartzman	3	7^{7}	6
(France) B Paire	6^{2}	4
(France) R Gasquet	7^{7}	6

Second round
4	(Greece) S Tsitsipas	4	6	3
Alt	(Poland) H Hurkacz	6	3	6
Q	(Belarus) I Ivashka	3	6^{6}
16	(France) G Monfils	6	7^{8}
10	(Spain) R Bautista Agut	6	7
(Argentina) D Schwartzman	2	5
(France) R Gasquet	6^{6}	6	7^{7}
5	(Japan) K Nishikori	7^{8}	2	6^{4}

Third round
Alt	(Poland) H Hurkacz	4	0
16	(France) G Monfils	6	6
10	(Spain) R Bautista Agut	7	7
(France) R Gasquet	5	5

Quarterfinals
16	(France) G Monfils	6	3	7^{7}
10	(Spain) R Bautista Agut	4	6	6^{2}

=== Bottom half ===
==== Section 3 ====
First round
(Switzerland) S Wawrinka	6	6
(Bulgaria) G Dimitrov	4	4
(Canada) F Auger-Aliassime	6	6^{3}	7^{7}
WC	(Canada) V Pospisil	2	7^{7}	6^{3}
(France) L Pouille	4	4
17	(Canada) M Raonic	6	6
13	(Georgia (country)) N Basilashvili	3	6	6
(Serbia) D Lajović	6	4	4
(Germany) J-L Struff	6	6
WC	(France) J-W Tsonga	2	2
(Hungary) M Fucsovics	7	2	3
(United Kingdom) C Norrie	5	6	6

Second round
6	(Russia) K Khachanov	6	6^{3}	6
(Switzerland) S Wawrinka	4	7^{7}	2
(Canada) F Auger-Aliassime	6	3	0
17	(Canada) M Raonic	3	6	0^{r}
13	(Georgia (country)) N Basilashvili	2	6	6
(Germany) J-L Struff	6	2	3
(United Kingdom) C Norrie	6^{4}	4
3	(Germany) A Zverev	7^{7}	6

Third round
6	(Russia) K Khachanov	6^{7}	7	6
(Canada) F Auger-Aliassime	7^{9}	5	3
13	(Georgia (country)) N Basilashvili	5	7	6^{5}
3	(Germany) A Zverev	7	5	7^{7}

Quarterfinals
6	(Russia) K Khachanov	6	6
3	(Germany) A Zverev	3	3

==== Section 4 ====
First round
(Australia) N Kyrgios	3	4
(United Kingdom) K Edmund	6	6
(Serbia) L Đere	2	6^{4}
(Chile) C Garín	6	7^{7}
(Australia) J Thompson	6	3	6^{6}
12	(United States) J Isner	3	6	7^{8}
14	(Croatia) M Čilić	6	7^{9}
Q	(United States) B Klahn	3	6^{7}
LL	(Australia) J Millman	6^{4}	7^{7}	6
Q	(Spain) F López	7^{7}	6^{2}	3
(France) P-H Herbert	3	5
(Canada) D Shapovalov	6	7

Second round
8	(Russia) D Medvedev	6	6
(United Kingdom) K Edmund	3	0
(Chile) C Garín	6	6
12	(United States) J Isner	3	4
14	(Croatia) M Čilić	6	6
LL	(Australia) J Millman	3	4
(Canada) D Shapovalov	4	6	3
2	(Austria) D Thiem	6	3	6

Third round
8	(Russia) D Medvedev	6	6
(Chile) C Garín	3	3
14	(Croatia) M Čilić	6^{7}	4
2	(Austria) D Thiem	7^{9}	6

Quarterfinals
8	(Russia) D Medvedev	6	6
2	(Austria) D Thiem	3	1

== Qualifying ==
=== Seeds ===
1. (Poland) Hubert Hurkacz (moved to main draw)
2. (United Kingdom) Dan Evans (qualified)
3. (Spain) Feliciano López (qualified)
4. (Australia) John Millman (qualifying competition; Lucky loser)
5. (Kazakhstan) Alexander Bublik (first round)
6. (Japan) Yoshihito Nishioka (qualifying competition)
7. (Lithuania) Ričardas Berankis (qualifying competition)
8. (Croatia) Ivo Karlović (qualifying competition, withdrew)
9. (Romania) Marius Copil (first round)
10. (South Africa) Lloyd Harris (first round)
11. (Netherlands) Robin Haase (first round)
12. (Australia) Alexei Popyrin (first round)
13. (United States) Bradley Klahn (qualified)
14. (Australia) Bernard Tomic (qualified)

=== Qualifiers ===
1. (Australia) Bernard Tomic
2. (United Kingdom) Dan Evans
3. (Spain) Feliciano López
4. (South Korea) Kwon Soon-woo
5. (United States) Bradley Klahn
6. (Belarus) Ilya Ivashka
7. (United States) Tommy Paul

=== Lucky loser ===
1. (Australia) John Millman

=== Qualifying draw ===
==== First qualifier ====
First round
Alt	(Russia) Andrey Rublev	6	5	6^{6}
(Australia) Marc Polmans	1	7	7^{8}
(Latvia) Ernests Gulbis	6^{4}	2
14	(Australia) Bernard Tomic	7^{7}	6

Qualifying competition
(Australia) Marc Polmans	4	6^{5}
14	(Australia) Bernard Tomic	6	7^{7}

==== Second qualifier ====
First round
2	(United Kingdom) Dan Evans	7^{7}	6
WC	(United States) Thai-Son Kwiatkowski	6^{4}	1
(Spain) Marcel Granollers	6	6
9	(Romania) Marius Copil	2	4

Qualifying competition
2	(United Kingdom) Dan Evans	6	6
(Spain) Marcel Granollers	3	3

==== Third qualifier ====
First round
3	(Spain) Feliciano López	7^{7}	7^{8}
(France) Grégoire Barrère	6^{5}	6^{6}
(Russia) Evgeny Donskoy	4	6	6^{3}
8	(Croatia) Ivo Karlović	6	4	7^{7}

Qualifying competition
3	(Spain) Feliciano López	w/o
8	(Croatia) Ivo Karlović

==== Fourth qualifier ====
First round
4	(Australia) John Millman	6	6
WC	(Canada) Filip Peliwo	1	0
(South Korea) Kwon Soon-woo	7^{7}	7^{7}
11	(Netherlands) Robin Haase	6^{4}	6^{3}

Qualifying competition
4	(Australia) John Millman	7^{8}	3	4
(South Korea) Kwon Soon-woo	6^{6}	6	6

==== Fifth qualifier ====
First round
5	(Kazakhstan) Alexander Bublik	4	4
WC	(Canada) Steven Diez	6	6
(Serbia) Viktor Troicki	5	3
13	(United States) Bradley Klahn	7	6

Qualifying competition
WC	(Canada) Steven Diez	6^{4}	6^{5}
13	(United States) Bradley Klahn	7^{7}	7^{7}

==== Sixth qualifier ====
First round
6	(Japan) Yoshihito Nishioka	6	6
(Tunisia) Malek Jaziri	2	3
(Belarus) Ilya Ivashka	5	6	6
10	(South Africa) Lloyd Harris	7	2	4

Qualifying competition
6	(Japan) Yoshihito Nishioka	4	3
(Belarus) Ilya Ivashka	6	6

==== Seventh qualifier ====
First round
7	(Lithuania) Ričardas Berankis	6	6
WC	(Canada) Alexis Galarneau	2	4
(United States) Tommy Paul	6	5	6
12	(Australia) Alexei Popyrin	4	7	4

Qualifying competition
7	(Lithuania) Ričardas Berankis	6	6^{3}	3
(United States) Tommy Paul	4	7^{7}	6
