= 2019 Rogers Cup – Women's singles =

Women's singles
- 2019 Rogers Cup

Final
- Champion: (Canada) Bianca Andreescu
- Runner-up: (United States) Serena Williams
- Score: 3–1 ret.

Details
- Draw: 56 (12 Q / 3 WC )
- Seeds: 16

Events
Singles	men	women
Doubles	men	women
← 2018 ·	Rogers Cup	· 2021 →

Bianca Andreescu won the women's singles tennis title at the 2019 Canadian Open after Serena Williams retired in the final due to back spasms, with the scoreline at 3–1. Andreescu became the first Canadian to win the event since Faye Urban in 1969.

Simona Halep was the defending champion, but retired in the quarterfinals against Marie Bouzková.

Naomi Osaka regained the WTA No. 1 singles ranking after Ashleigh Barty lost in the second round and Karolína Plíšková lost in the quarterfinals to Andreescu.

== Seeds ==
The top eight seeds received a bye into the second round.

1. (Australia) Ashleigh Barty (second round)
2. (Japan) Naomi Osaka (quarterfinals)
3. (Czech Republic) Karolína Plíšková (quarterfinals)
4. (Romania) Simona Halep (quarterfinals, retired due to an Achilles injury)
5. (Netherlands) Kiki Bertens (third round)
6. (Ukraine) Elina Svitolina (quarterfinals)
7. (United States) Sloane Stephens (second round)
8. (United States) Serena Williams (final, retired due to back spasms)

9. (Belarus) Aryna Sabalenka (first round)
10. (Latvia) Anastasija Sevastova (first round)
11. (Switzerland) Belinda Bencic (third round)
12. (Germany) Angelique Kerber (first round)
13. (United Kingdom) Johanna Konta (first round)
14. (United States) Madison Keys (first round)
15. (Denmark) Caroline Wozniacki (second round)
16. (Estonia) Anett Kontaveit (third round)

Click on the seed number of a player to go to their draw section.

== Draw ==
=== Key ===
- Q = Qualifier
- WC = Wild card
- LL = Lucky loser
- Alt = Alternate
- ITF = ITF entry
- PR = Protected ranking
- SR = Special ranking
- SE = Special exempt
- JE = Junior exempt
- JR = Junior Accelerator Programme entrant
- CO = College Accelerator Programme entrant
- NG = Next Gen Accelerator Program entrant
- w/o = Walkover
- r = Retired
- d = Defaulted

=== Finals ===
Quarterfinals
(United States) Sofia Kenin	7^{7}	6
6	(Ukraine) Elina Svitolina	6^{2}	4
3	(Czech Republic) Karolína Plíšková	0	6	4
(Canada) Bianca Andreescu	6	2	6
Q	(Czech Republic) Marie Bouzková	6	0
4	(Romania) Simona Halep	4	0^{r}
8	(United States) Serena Williams	6	6
2	(Japan) Naomi Osaka	3	4

Semifinals
(United States) Sofia Kenin	4	6^{5}
(Canada) Bianca Andreescu	6	7^{7}
Q	(Czech Republic) Marie Bouzková	6	3	3
8	(United States) Serena Williams	1	6	6

Final
(Canada) Bianca Andreescu	3
8	(United States) Serena Williams	1^{r}

=== Top half ===
==== Section 1 ====
First round
(United States) S Kenin	6	6
(Chinese Taipei) S-w Hsieh	4	3
(Belarus) V Azarenka	6	6
(Italy) C Giorgi	2	2
(Ukraine) D Yastremska	6	6
13	(United Kingdom) J Konta	3	2
11	(Switzerland) B Bencic	6	6
Q	(Russia) A Potapova	2	1
Q	(Slovenia) P Hercog	3	6	6^{5}
(Germany) J Görges	6	1	7^{7}
(United States) D Collins	6	6^{3}	2
(Czech Republic) K Siniaková	4	7^{7}	6

Second round
1	(Australia) A Barty	7^{7}	3	4
(United States) S Kenin	6^{5}	6	6
(Belarus) V Azarenka	5	5
(Ukraine) D Yastremska	7	7
11	(Switzerland) B Bencic	5	6	6
(Germany) J Görges	7	3	4
(Czech Republic) K Siniaková	3	6	3
6	(Ukraine) E Svitolina	6	3	6

Third round
(United States) S Kenin	6	6
(Ukraine) D Yastremska	2	2
11	(Switzerland) B Bencic	2	4
6	(Ukraine) E Svitolina	6	6

Quarterfinals
(United States) S Kenin	7^{7}	6
6	(Ukraine) E Svitolina	6^{2}	4

==== Section 2 ====
First round
(Greece) M Sakkari	6	2	6^{7}
Q	(United States) A Riske	4	6	7^{9}
(Spain) C Suárez Navarro	6	6
(United States) V Williams	4	2
WC	(Russia) M Sharapova	6	3	4
16	(Estonia) A Kontaveit	4	6	6
12	(Germany) A Kerber	6	2	4
(Russia) D Kasatkina	0	6	6
WC	(Canada) E Bouchard	6	1	4
(Canada) B Andreescu	4	6	6
(Croatia) P Martić	4	5
Q	(United States) F Di Lorenzo	6	7

Second round
3	(Czech Republic) Ka Plíšková	6	6^{4}	6
Q	(United States) A Riske	4	7^{7}	2
(Spain) C Suárez Navarro	5	1^{r}
16	(Estonia) A Kontaveit	7	3
(Russia) D Kasatkina	7	2	5
(Canada) B Andreescu	5	6	7
Q	(United States) F Di Lorenzo	2	1
5	(Netherlands) K Bertens	6	6

Third round
3	(Czech Republic) Ka Plíšková	6	7
16	(Estonia) A Kontaveit	3	5
(Canada) B Andreescu	6	6^{7}	6
5	(Netherlands) K Bertens	1	7^{9}	4

Quarterfinals
3	(Czech Republic) Ka Plíšková	0	6	4
(Canada) B Andreescu	6	2	6

=== Bottom half ===
==== Section 3 ====
First round
WC	(Canada) L Fernandez	0	1
Q	(Czech Republic) M Bouzková	6	6
(France) C Garcia	3	3
(Latvia) J Ostapenko	6	6
Alt	(Russia) A Pavlyuchenkova	3	6	7
9	(Belarus) A Sabalenka	6	3	5
14	(United States) M Keys	6	6^{5}	6^{5}
(Croatia) D Vekić	3	7^{7}	7^{7}
WC	(Russia) S Kuznetsova	6	6
Q	(China) Xiyu Wang	2	4
Q	(United States) J Brady	6	6
WC	(France) K Mladenovic	1	2

Second round
7	(United States) S Stephens	2	5
Q	(Czech Republic) M Bouzková	6	7
(Latvia) J Ostapenko	6	2	6
Alt	(Russia) A Pavlyuchenkova	2	6	4
(Croatia) D Vekić	6^{4}	3
WC	(Russia) S Kuznetsova	7^{7}	6
Q	(United States) J Brady	6	5	6^{5}
4	(Romania) S Halep	4	7	7^{7}

Third round
Q	(Czech Republic) M Bouzková	6	6
(Latvia) J Ostapenko	2	2
WC	(Russia) S Kuznetsova	2	1
4	(Romania) S Halep	6	6

Quarterfinals
Q	(Czech Republic) M Bouzková	6	0
4	(Romania) S Halep	4	0^{r}

==== Section 4 ====
First round
(Belgium) E Mertens	3	6	6
(Belarus) A Sasnovich	6	3	1
Q	(Japan) M Doi	2	2
Q	(Russia) E Alexandrova	6	6
LL	(China) S Zhang	7^{7}	6
10	(Latvia) A Sevastova	6^{5}	2
15	(Denmark) C Wozniacki	6	6
(Kazakhstan) Y Putintseva	4	2
Q	(Poland) I Świątek	4
Q	(Australia) A Tomljanović	1^{r}
(China) S Zheng	3	4
Q	(Germany) T Maria	6	6

Second round
8	(United States) S Williams	6	6
(Belgium) E Mertens	3	3
Q	(Russia) E Alexandrova	6	6
LL	(China) S Zhang	4	3
15	(Denmark) C Wozniacki	6	3	4
Q	(Poland) I Świątek	1	6	6
Q	(Germany) T Maria	2	0^{r}
2	(Japan) N Osaka	6	0

Third round
8	(United States) S Williams	7	6
Q	(Russia) E Alexandrova	5	4
Q	(Poland) I Świątek	6^{4}	4
2	(Japan) N Osaka	7^{7}	6

Quarterfinals
8	(United States) S Williams	6	6
2	(Japan) N Osaka	3	4

== Qualifying ==
=== Seeds ===
1. (China) Zhang Shuai (qualifying competition, retired, Lucky loser)
2. (United States) Alison Riske (qualified)
3. (Australia) Ajla Tomljanović (qualified)
4. (Puerto Rico) Monica Puig (qualifying competition)
5. (Russia) Ekaterina Alexandrova (qualified)
6. (Slovenia) Polona Hercog (qualified)
7. (Romania) Mihaela Buzărnescu (qualifying competition)
8. (Tunisia) Ons Jabeur (qualifying competition)
9. (Poland) Iga Świątek (qualified)
10. (Ukraine) Kateryna Kozlova (first round)
11. (Sweden) Rebecca Peterson (qualifying competition)
12. (Poland) Magda Linette (first round)
13. (Germany) Tatjana Maria (qualified)
14. (Russia) Anastasia Potapova (qualified)
15. (United States) Jennifer Brady (qualified)
16. (Germany) Andrea Petkovic (qualifying competition)
17. (Japan) Misaki Doi (qualified)
18. (Czech Republic) Marie Bouzková (qualified)
19. (Australia) Astra Sharma (first round)
20. (United States) Christina McHale (qualifying competition)
21. (United Kingdom) Heather Watson (qualifying competition)
22. (Belgium) Ysaline Bonaventure (first round)
23. (United States) Varvara Lepchenko (qualifying competition)
24. (Czech Republic) Barbora Krejčíková (first round)

=== Qualifiers ===
1. (Russia) Anastasia Potapova
2. (United States) Alison Riske
3. (Australia) Ajla Tomljanović
4. (United States) Jennifer Brady
5. (Russia) Ekaterina Alexandrova
6. (Slovenia) Polona Hercog
7. (Japan) Misaki Doi
8. (United States) Francesca Di Lorenzo
9. (Poland) Iga Świątek
10. (Czech Republic) Marie Bouzková
11. (China) Wang Xiyu
12. (Germany) Tatjana Maria

=== Lucky loser ===
1. (China) Zhang Shuai

=== Qualifying draw ===
==== First qualifier ====
First round
1	(China) Zhang Shuai	6	2	6
(Australia) Priscilla Hon	4	6	3
(Canada) Gabriela Dabrowski	4	6	3
14	(Russia) Anastasia Potapova	6	3	6

Qualifying competition
1	(China) Zhang Shuai	6^{2}	1^{r}
14	(Russia) Anastasia Potapova	7^{7}	1

==== Second qualifier ====
First round
2	(United States) Alison Riske	6	6
WC	(Canada) Carol Zhao	2	1
PR	(Czech Republic) Lucie Hradecká	3	4
23	(United States) Varvara Lepchenko	6	6

Qualifying competition
2	(United States) Alison Riske	6	6
23	(United States) Varvara Lepchenko	4	4

==== Third qualifier ====
First round
3	(Australia) Ajla Tomljanović	7	6
(Slovakia) Jana Čepelová	5	2
WC	(Canada) Ariana Arseneault	5	2
20	(United States) Christina McHale	7	6

Qualifying competition
3	(Australia) Ajla Tomljanović	6	7^{7}
20	(United States) Christina McHale	4	6^{2}

==== Fourth qualifier ====
First round
4	(Puerto Rico) Monica Puig	6	6
(Australia) Destanee Aiava	1	1
(China) Peng Shuai	5	5
15	(United States) Jennifer Brady	7	7

Qualifying competition
4	(Puerto Rico) Monica Puig	3	2
15	(United States) Jennifer Brady	6	6

==== Fifth qualifier ====
First round
5	(Russia) Ekaterina Alexandrova	6	6
WC	(Canada) Louise Kwong	0	1
(Hungary) Tímea Babos	6	6
24	(Czech Republic) Barbora Krejčíková	3	2

Qualifying competition
5	(Russia) Ekaterina Alexandrova	7	7^{7}
(Hungary) Tímea Babos	5	6^{5}

==== Sixth qualifier ====
First round
6	(Slovenia) Polona Hercog	6	6
(United States) Allie Kiick	3	0
(United States) Nicole Gibbs	7	4	3
16	(Germany) Andrea Petkovic	5	6	6

Qualifying competition
6	(Slovenia) Polona Hercog	6	6
16	(Germany) Andrea Petkovic	4	3

==== Seventh qualifier ====
First round
7	(Romania) Mihaela Buzărnescu	7^{7}	6
WC	(Canada) Carson Branstine	6^{4}	3
(Croatia) Darija Jurak	1	2
17	(Japan) Misaki Doi	6	6

Qualifying competition
7	(Romania) Mihaela Buzărnescu	6^{1}	5
17	(Japan) Misaki Doi	7^{7}	7

==== Eighth qualifier ====
First round
8	(Tunisia) Ons Jabeur	6	6
(Canada) Françoise Abanda	4	3
(United States) Francesca Di Lorenzo	6	6
19	(Australia) Astra Sharma	1	4

Qualifying competition
8	(Tunisia) Ons Jabeur	3	6	2
(United States) Francesca Di Lorenzo	6	2	6

==== Ninth qualifier ====
First round
9	(Poland) Iga Świątek	6	7
PR	(United States) Shelby Rogers	4	5
(Japan) Hiroko Kuwata	6	4	2
21	(United Kingdom) Heather Watson	3	6	6

Qualifying competition
9	(Poland) Iga Świątek	6	6
21	(United Kingdom) Heather Watson	4	2

==== Tenth qualifier ====
First round
10	(Ukraine) Kateryna Kozlova	2	3
(United States) Sachia Vickery	6	6
(Serbia) Jovana Jakšić	1	5
18	(Czech Republic) Marie Bouzková	6	7

Qualifying competition
(United States) Sachia Vickery	3	2
18	(Czech Republic) Marie Bouzková	6	6

==== Eleventh qualifier ====
First round
11	(Sweden) Rebecca Peterson	6	6
WC	(Canada) Catherine Leduc	0	0
(China) Wang Xiyu	4	7	6
22	(Belgium) Ysaline Bonaventure	6	5	4

Qualifying competition
11	(Sweden) Rebecca Peterson	4	2
(China) Wang Xiyu	6	6

==== Twelfth qualifier ====
First round
12	(Poland) Magda Linette	4	6^{3}
(Japan) Nao Hibino	6	7^{7}
WC	(Canada) Layne Sleeth	2	2
13	(Germany) Tatjana Maria	6	6

Qualifying competition
(Japan) Nao Hibino	2	1
13	(Germany) Tatjana Maria	6	6
