= 2019 Rogers Cup =

Canadian tennis tournament

- Date: August 5–11
- Edition: 130th (men) / 118th (women)
- Category: ATP Tour Masters 1000 (men); WTA Premier 5 (women)
- Surface: Hard / outdoor
- Location: Montreal, Canada (men); Toronto, Canada (women)

Champions

Men's singles
- (Spain) Rafael Nadal

Women's singles
- (Canada) Bianca Andreescu

Men's doubles
- (Spain) Marcel Granollers / (Argentina) Horacio Zeballos

Women's doubles
- (Czech Republic) Barbora Krejčíková / (Czech Republic) Kateřina Siniaková
- Rogers Cup

The 2019 Rogers Cup were outdoor hard court tennis tournaments played from August 5–11, 2019, as part of the 2019 US Open Series. It was the 130th edition of the men's Canadian Open, a Masters 1000 event on the 2019 ATP Tour at IGA Stadium in Montreal, and the 118th edition of the women's tournament, a Premier 5 event of the 2019 WTA Tour played at Aviva Centre in Toronto.

== Points and prize money ==
=== Point distribution ===
Event	W	F	SF	QF	Round of 16	Round of 32	Round of 64	Q	Q2	Q1
Men's singles	1000	600	360	180	90	45	10	25	16	0
Men's doubles	1000	600	360	180	90	0	—N/a	—N/a	—N/a	—N/a
Women's singles	900	585	350	190	105	60	1	30	20	1
Women's doubles	900	585	350	190	105	1	—N/a	—N/a	—N/a	—N/a

=== Prize money ===
Event	W	F	SF	QF	Round of 16	Round of 32	Round of 64	Q2	Q1
Men's singles	$1,049,040	$531,010	$272,365	$140,385	$70,325	$36,830	$20,755	$7,945	$3,970
Women's singles	$521,530	$253,420	$126,950	$60,455	$29,120	$14,920	$8,045	$3,270	$1,980
Men's doubles	$311,910	$152,210	$76,300	$38,870	$20,500	$10,980	—N/a	—N/a	—N/a
Women's doubles	$148,605	$75,060	$37,160	$18,705	$9,490	$4,690	—N/a	—N/a	—N/a

== ATP singles main-draw entrants ==
=== Seeds ===
The following are the seeded players. Seedings are based on ATP rankings as of July 29, 2019. Rankings and points before are as of August 5, 2019.

Seed	Rank	Player	Points before	Points defending	Points won	Points after	Status
1	2	(Spain) Rafael Nadal	7,945	1,000	1,000	7,945	Champion, defeated (Russia) Daniil Medvedev [8]
2	4	(Austria) Dominic Thiem	4,755	10	180	4,925	Quarterfinals lost to (Russia) Daniil Medvedev [8]
3	7	(Germany) Alexander Zverev	4,005	180	180	4,005	Quarterfinals lost to (Russia) Karen Khachanov [6]
4	5	(Greece) Stefanos Tsitsipas	4,045	600	10	3,455	Second round lost to (Poland) Hubert Hurkacz [Alt]
5	6	(Japan) Kei Nishikori	4,040	10	10	4,040	Second round lost to (France) Richard Gasquet
6	8	(Russia) Karen Khachanov	2,890	360	360	2,890	Semifinals lost to (Russia) Daniil Medvedev [8]
7	11	(Italy) Fabio Fognini	2,420	45	180	2,555	Quarterfinals lost to (Spain) Rafael Nadal [1]
8	9	(Russia) Daniil Medvedev	2,745	115	600	3,230	Runner-up, lost to (Spain) Rafael Nadal [1]
~~9~~	~~10~~	~~(South Africa) Kevin Anderson~~	2,500	360	0	2,140	Withdrew due to right knee injury
10	13	(Spain) Roberto Bautista Agut	2,215	0	180	2,395	Quarterfinals lost to (France) Gaël Monfils [16]
11	14	(Croatia) Borna Ćorić	2,195	45	45	2,195	Second round lost to (France) Adrian Mannarino
12	15	(United States) John Isner	2,085	90	45	2,040	Second round lost to (Chile) Cristian Garín
13	17	(Georgia (country)) Nikoloz Basilashvili	1,975	(45)^{†}	90	2,020	Third round lost to (Germany) Alexander Zverev [3]
14	16	(Croatia) Marin Čilić	2,030	180	90	1,940	Third round lost to (Austria) Dominic Thiem [2]
15	18	(Belgium) David Goffin	1,770	10	10	1,770	First round lost to (Argentina) Guido Pella
16	20	(France) Gaël Monfils	1,770	0	360	2,130	Semifinals withdrew due to ankle injury
17	19	(Canada) Milos Raonic	1,810	45	45	1,810	Second round lost to (Canada) Félix Auger-Aliassime

† The player did not qualify for the tournament in 2018. Accordingly, points for his 18th best result are deducted instead.

=== Withdrawals ===
The following players would have been seeded, but they withdrew from the event.

Rank	Player	Points before	Points defending	Points after	Reason
1	(Serbia) Novak Djokovic	12,415	90	12,325	Scheduling
3	(Switzerland) Roger Federer	7,460	0	7,460	Scheduling
12	(Argentina) Juan Martín del Potro	2,230	0	2,230	Knee Injury

=== Other entrants ===
The following players received wild cards into the main singles draw:

- (Canada) Peter Polansky
- (Canada) Vasek Pospisil
- (Canada) Brayden Schnur
- (France) Jo-Wilfried Tsonga

The following player received entry as special exempt:

- (Germany) Peter Gojowczyk

The following player received entry as an alternate:

- (Poland) Hubert Hurkacz

The following players received entry from the singles qualifying draw:

- (United Kingdom) Dan Evans
- (Belarus) Ilya Ivashka
- (United States) Bradley Klahn
- (South Korea) Kwon Soon-woo
- (Spain) Feliciano López
- (United States) Tommy Paul
- (Australia) Bernard Tomic

The following player received entry as a lucky loser:

- (Australia) John Millman

=== Withdrawals ===
Before the tournament

- (South Africa) Kevin Anderson → replaced by (Poland) Hubert Hurkacz
- (Italy) Matteo Berrettini → replaced by (Australia) John Millman
- (Uruguay) Pablo Cuevas → replaced by (Bulgaria) Grigor Dimitrov
- (Argentina) Juan Martín del Potro → replaced by (Australia) Jordan Thompson
- (Serbia) Novak Djokovic → replaced by (Kazakhstan) Mikhail Kukushkin
- (Switzerland) Roger Federer → replaced by (France) Richard Gasquet
- (United States) Frances Tiafoe → replaced by (United Kingdom) Cameron Norrie
- (Spain) Fernando Verdasco → replaced by (Hungary) Márton Fucsovics

== ATP doubles main-draw entrants ==
=== Seeds ===
Country	Player	Country	Player	Rank^{1}	Seed
COL	Juan Sebastián Cabal	COL	Robert Farah	2	1
POL	Łukasz Kubot	BRA	Marcelo Melo	9	2
CRO	Mate Pavić	BRA	Bruno Soares	25	3
FRA	Nicolas Mahut	FRA	Édouard Roger-Vasselin	27	4
NED	Jean-Julien Rojer	ROU	Horia Tecău	28	5
FIN	Henri Kontinen	AUS	John Peers	29	6
USA	Bob Bryan	USA	Mike Bryan	34	7
CRO	Nikola Mektić	CRO	Franko Škugor	37	8

- Rankings are as of July 29, 2019

=== Other entrants ===
The following pairs received wildcards into the doubles main draw:

- (Canada) Félix Auger-Aliassime / (Canada) Vasek Pospisil
- (Spain) Feliciano López / (United Kingdom) Andy Murray
- (Canada) Peter Polansky / (Canada) Brayden Schnur

== WTA singles main-draw entrants ==
=== Seeds ===
Country	Player	Rank^{1}	Seed
AUS	Ashleigh Barty	1	1
JPN	Naomi Osaka	2	2
CZE	Karolína Plíšková	3	3
ROU	Simona Halep	4	4
NED	Kiki Bertens	5	5
UKR	Elina Svitolina	7	6
USA	Sloane Stephens	8	7
USA	Serena Williams	9	8
BLR	Aryna Sabalenka	10	9
LAT	Anastasija Sevastova	11	10
SUI	Belinda Bencic	12	11
GER	Angelique Kerber	13	12
GBR	Johanna Konta	14	13
USA	Madison Keys	17	14
DEN	Caroline Wozniacki	18	15
EST	Anett Kontaveit	19	16

- ^{1} Rankings are as of July 29, 2019

=== Other entrants ===
The following players received wild cards into the main singles draw:

- (Canada) Eugenie Bouchard
- (Canada) Leylah Annie Fernandez
- (Russia) Svetlana Kuznetsova
- (France) Kristina Mladenovic
- (Russia) Maria Sharapova

The following player received entry as an alternate:

- (Russia) Anastasia Pavlyuchenkova

The following players received entry from the singles qualifying draw:

- (Russia) Ekaterina Alexandrova
- (Czech Republic) Marie Bouzková
- (United States) Jennifer Brady
- (United States) Francesca Di Lorenzo
- (Japan) Misaki Doi
- (Slovenia) Polona Hercog
- (Germany) Tatjana Maria
- (Russia) Anastasia Potapova
- (United States) Alison Riske
- (Poland) Iga Świątek
- (Australia) Ajla Tomljanović
- (China) Wang Xiyu

The following player received entry as a lucky loser:

- (China) Zhang Shuai

=== Withdrawals ===
Before the tournament

- (United States) Amanda Anisimova → replaced by (Russia) Anastasia Pavlyuchenkova
- (Czech Republic) Petra Kvitová → replaced by (United States) Venus Williams
- (Spain) Garbiñe Muguruza → replaced by (China) Zheng Saisai
- (Ukraine) Lesia Tsurenko → replaced by (China) Zhang Shuai
- (China) Wang Qiang → replaced by (Italy) Camila Giorgi
- (Czech Republic) Markéta Vondroušová → replaced by (Belarus) Victoria Azarenka

=== Retirements ===
- (Romania) Simona Halep (left lower leg injury)
- (Germany) Tatjana Maria (left abdominal injury)
- (Spain) Carla Suárez Navarro (right hip injury)
- (Australia) Ajla Tomljanović (left abdominal injury)
- (United States) Serena Williams (upper back injury)

== WTA doubles main-draw entrants ==
=== Seeds ===
Country	Player	Country	Player	Rank^{1}	Seed
CZE	Barbora Krejčíková	CZE	Kateřina Siniaková	20	1
CAN	Gabriela Dabrowski	CHN	Xu Yifan	20	2
GER	Anna-Lena Grönefeld	NED	Demi Schuurs	28	3
BEL	Kirsten Flipkens	TPE	Hsieh Su-wei	29	4
TPE	Chan Hao-ching	TPE	Latisha Chan	30	5
BLR	Victoria Azarenka	AUS	Ashleigh Barty	35	6
USA	Nicole Melichar	CZE	Květa Peschke	37	7
CZE	Lucie Hradecká	SLO	Andreja Klepač	49	8

- ^{1} Rankings are as of July 29, 2019

=== Other entrants ===
The following pairs received wildcards into the doubles main draw:

- (Canada) Françoise Abanda / (Canada) Carson Branstine
- (Canada) Eugenie Bouchard / (Canada) Sharon Fichman
- (Canada) Leylah Annie Fernandez / (Romania) Simona Halep

=== Retirements ===
- (China) Yang Zhaoxuan (viral illness)

== Finals ==
=== Men's singles ===
- (Spain) Rafael Nadal defeated (Russia) Daniil Medvedev, 6–3, 6–0

=== Women's singles ===
- (Canada) Bianca Andreescu defeated (United States) Serena Williams, 3–1, retired

=== Men's doubles ===
- (Spain) Marcel Granollers / (Argentina) Horacio Zeballos defeated (Netherlands) Robin Haase / (Netherlands) Wesley Koolhof, 7–5, 7–5

=== Women's doubles ===
- (Czech Republic) Barbora Krejčíková / (Czech Republic) Kateřina Siniaková defeated (Germany) Anna-Lena Grönefeld / (Netherlands) Demi Schuurs, 7–5, 6–0
