= 2021 Mutua Madrid Open – Women's doubles =

Women's doubles
- 2021 Mutua Madrid Open

Final
- Champions: (Czech Republic) Barbora Krejčíková (Czech Republic) Kateřina Siniaková
- Runners-up: (Canada) Gabriela Dabrowski (Netherlands) Demi Schuurs
- Score: 6–4, 6–3

Events
Singles	men	women
Doubles	men	women
← 2019 ·	Mutua Madrid Open	· 2022 →

Barbora Krejčíková and Kateřina Siniaková defeated Gabriela Dabrowski and Demi Schuurs in the final, 6–4, 6–3 to win the women's doubles tennis title at the 2021 Madrid Open. It marked the duo's seventh career WTA Tour doubles title together, as well as Krejčíková's eighth individual doubles title and Siniaková's 10th.

Hsieh Su-wei and Barbora Strýcová were the reigning champions from when the tournament was last held in 2019, but Strýcová did not return to compete due to her pregnancy. Hsieh partnered Elise Mertens; they lost in the second round to Jeļena Ostapenko and Anastasia Pavlyuchenkova. Despite the loss, Mertens usurped Hsieh for the WTA No. 1 doubles ranking.

== Seeds ==
1. (Chinese Taipei) Hsieh Su-wei / (Belgium) Elise Mertens (second round)
2. (Czech Republic) Barbora Krejčíková / (Czech Republic) Kateřina Siniaková (champions)
3. (Canada) Gabriela Dabrowski / (Netherlands) Demi Schuurs (final)
4. (Japan) Shuko Aoyama / (Japan) Ena Shibahara (first round)
5. (Chile) Alexa Guarachi / (United States) Desirae Krawczyk (second round)
6. (Chinese Taipei) Chan Hao-ching / (Chinese Taipei) Latisha Chan (first round)
7. (China) Xu Yifan / (China) Zhang Shuai (quarterfinals)
8. (United States) Hayley Carter / (Brazil) Luisa Stefani (first round)

== Draw ==
=== Key ===
- Q = Qualifier
- WC = Wild card
- LL = Lucky loser
- Alt = Alternate
- SE = Special exempt
- PR = Protected ranking
- ITF = ITF entry
- JE = Junior exempt
- w/o = Walkover
- r = Retired
- d = Defaulted
- SR = Special ranking

=== Finals ===
Semifinals
(Latvia) Jeļena Ostapenko (Russia) Anastasia Pavlyuchenkova	7	4	[6]
3	(Canada) Gabriela Dabrowski (Netherlands) Demi Schuurs	5	6	[10]
(Switzerland) Belinda Bencic (Switzerland) Jil Teichmann	2	4
2	(Czech Republic) Barbora Krejčíková (Czech Republic) Kateřina Siniaková	6	6

Final
3	(Canada) Gabriela Dabrowski (Netherlands) Demi Schuurs	4	3
2	(Czech Republic) Barbora Krejčíková (Czech Republic) Kateřina Siniaková	6	6

=== Top half ===
First round
(Latvia) J Ostapenko (Russia) A Pavlyuchenkova	6	5	[10]
PR	(Japan) M Ninomiya (Kazakhstan) Y Shvedova	1	7	[7]
PR	(Russia) E Vesnina (Russia) V Zvonareva	6	6
(Czech Republic) L Hradecká (Germany) L Siegemund	3	4
(United States) B Mattek-Sands (Poland) I Świątek	2	6	[10]
8	(United States) H Carter (Brazil) L Stefani	6	3	[6]
3	(Canada) G Dabrowski (Netherlands) D Schuurs	7^{7}	7
PR	(Georgia (country)) O Kalashnikova (Russia) A Kudryavtseva	6^{2}	5
(Russia) V Kudermetova (Russia) A Potapova	w/o
(Belarus) V Azarenka (Tunisia) O Jabeur
(Australia) E Perez (China) S Zheng	6	2	[10]
(United States) K Christian (United States) S Santamaria	2	6	[7]
WC	(Spain) P Badosa (Spain) S Sorribes Tormo	7^{7}	6^{2}	[7]
5	(Chile) A Guarachi (United States) D Krawczyk	6^{2}	7^{7}	[10]

Second round
1	(Chinese Taipei) S-w Hsieh (Belgium) E Mertens	6^{2}	6	[9]
(Latvia) J Ostapenko (Russia) A Pavlyuchenkova	7^{7}	4	[11]
PR	(Russia) E Vesnina (Russia) V Zvonareva	4	6	[10]
(United States) B Mattek-Sands (Poland) I Świątek	6	3	[5]
3	(Canada) G Dabrowski (Netherlands) D Schuurs	4	6	[10]
(Russia) V Kudermetova (Russia) A Potapova	6	2	[7]
(Australia) E Perez (China) S Zheng	6	6
5	(Chile) A Guarachi (United States) D Krawczyk	4	4

Quarterfinals
(Latvia) J Ostapenko (Russia) A Pavlyuchenkova	7^{7}	6
PR	(Russia) E Vesnina (Russia) V Zvonareva	6^{2}	3
3	(Canada) G Dabrowski (Netherlands) D Schuurs	6	6
(Australia) E Perez (China) S Zheng	2	4

Semifinals
(Latvia) J Ostapenko (Russia) A Pavlyuchenkova	7	4	[6]
3	(Canada) G Dabrowski (Netherlands) D Schuurs	5	6	[10]

=== Bottom half ===
First round
6	(Chinese Taipei) H-c Chan (Chinese Taipei) L Chan	6	3	[3]
Alt	(Croatia) P Martić (United States) S Rogers	2	6	[10]
(Ukraine) N Kichenok (Romania) R Olaru	7	6
(Russia) E Alexandrova (China) Z Yang	5	3
(Croatia) D Jurak (Slovenia) A Klepač	4	6^{7}
(Switzerland) B Bencic (Switzerland) J Teichmann	6	7^{9}
(Japan) N Hibino (Czech Republic) R Voráčová	7^{7}	4	[10]
4	(Japan) S Aoyama (Japan) E Shibahara	6^{4}	6	[7]
7	(China) Y Xu (China) S Zhang	7	7
(United States) C Gauff (United States) N Melichar	5	5
(Canada) S Fichman (Mexico) G Olmos	6	6
(Ukraine) L Kichenok (Romania) M Niculescu	4	0
Alt	(Poland) P Kania-Choduń (Poland) K Piter	3	3
(United States) M Keys (United States) J Pegula	6	6

Second round
Alt	(Croatia) P Martić (United States) S Rogers	6	6
(Ukraine) N Kichenok (Romania) R Olaru	1	4
(Switzerland) B Bencic (Switzerland) J Teichmann	6	7
(Japan) N Hibino (Czech Republic) R Voráčová	3	5
7	(China) Y Xu (China) S Zhang	6	6
(Canada) S Fichman (Mexico) G Olmos	4	3
(United States) M Keys (United States) J Pegula	6	2	[8]
2	(Czech Republic) B Krejčíková (Czech Republic) K Siniaková	3	6	[10]

Quarterfinals
Alt	(Croatia) P Martić (United States) S Rogers	3	6^{3}
(Switzerland) B Bencic (Switzerland) J Teichmann	6	7^{7}
7	(China) Y Xu (China) S Zhang	1	0
2	(Czech Republic) B Krejčíková (Czech Republic) K Siniaková	6	6

Semifinals
(Switzerland) B Bencic (Switzerland) J Teichmann	2	4
2	(Czech Republic) B Krejčíková (Czech Republic) K Siniaková	6	6

== WTA doubles main draw entrants ==
=== Seeds ===
Country	Player	Country	Player	Rank^{1}	Seed
TPE	Hsieh Su-wei	BEL	Elise Mertens	4	1
CZE	Barbora Krejčíková	CZE	Kateřina Siniaková	15	2
CAN	Gabriela Dabrowski	NED	Demi Schuurs	23	3
JPN	Shuko Aoyama	JPN	Ena Shibahara	26	4
CHI	Alexa Guarachi	USA	Desirae Krawczyk	34	5
TPE	Chan Hao-ching	TPE	Latisha Chan	42	6
CHN	Xu Yifan	CHN	Zhang Shuai	47	7
USA	Hayley Carter	BRA	Luisa Stefani	53	8

- Rankings are as of April 26, 2021.

=== Other entrants ===
The following pairs received wildcards into the doubles main draw:

- (Spain) Paula Badosa / (Spain) Sara Sorribes Tormo
- (Spain) ~~Aliona Bolsova~~ / (Montenegro) ~~Danka Kovinić~~

The following pair received entry into the doubles main draw using a protected ranking:

- (Georgia (country)) Oksana Kalashnikova / (Russia) Alla Kudryavtseva
- (Japan) Makoto Ninomiya / (Kazakhstan) Yaroslava Shvedova
- (Russia) Elena Vesnina / (Russia) Vera Zvonareva

The following pair received entry into the doubles draw as an alternate:

- (Poland) Paula Kania-Choduń / (Poland) Katarzyna Piter
- (Croatia) Petra Martić / (United States) Shelby Rogers

=== Withdrawals ===
Before the tournament

- (Hungary) Tímea Babos / (Russia) Veronika Kudermetova → replaced by (Russia) Veronika Kudermetova / (Russia) Anastasia Potapova
- (Australia) Ashleigh Barty / (United States) Jennifer Brady → replaced by (Japan) Nao Hibino / (Czech Republic) Renata Voráčová
- (Spain) Aliona Bolsova / (Montenegro) Danka Kovinić → replaced by (Poland) Paula Kania-Choduń / (Poland) Katarzyna Piter
- (Russia) Anna Kalinskaya / (Slovakia) Viktória Kužmová → replaced by (Russia) Ekaterina Alexandrova / (China) Yang Zhaoxuan
- (United States) Asia Muhammad / (United States) Jessica Pegula → replaced by (United States) Kaitlyn Christian / (United States) Sabrina Santamaria
- (Kazakhstan) Elena Rybakina / (Greece) Maria Sakkari → replaced by (Croatia) Petra Martić / (United States) Shelby Rogers

During the tournament

- (Belarus) Victoria Azarenka / (Tunisia) Ons Jabeur
