= 2019 Rogers Cup – Men's doubles =

Men's doubles
- 2019 Rogers Cup

Final
- Champions: (Spain) Marcel Granollers (Argentina) Horacio Zeballos
- Runners-up: (Netherlands) Robin Haase (Netherlands) Wesley Koolhof
- Score: 7–5, 7–5

Details
- Draw: 32
- Seeds: 8

Events
Singles	men	women
Doubles	men	women
- Rogers Cup

Henri Kontinen and John Peers were the defending champions, but lost in the second round to Marcel Granollers and Horacio Zeballos.

Granollers and Zeballos went on to win the title, defeating Robin Haase and Wesley Koolhof in the final, 7–5, 7–5.

== Seeds ==
1. (Colombia) Juan Sebastián Cabal / (Colombia) Robert Farah (first round)
2. (Poland) Łukasz Kubot / (Brazil) Marcelo Melo (first round)
3. (Croatia) Mate Pavić / (Brazil) Bruno Soares (first round)
4. (France) Nicolas Mahut / (France) Édouard Roger-Vasselin (first round)
5. (Netherlands) Jean-Julien Rojer / (Romania) Horia Tecău (second round)
6. (Finland) Henri Kontinen / (Australia) John Peers (second round)
7. (United States) Bob Bryan / (United States) Mike Bryan (quarterfinals)
8. (Croatia) Nikola Mektić / (Croatia) Franko Škugor (first round)

== Draw ==
Key

- Q = Qualifier
- WC = Wild card
- LL = Lucky loser
- Alt = Alternate
- ITF = ITF entry
- PR = Protected ranking
- SR = Special ranking
- SE = Special exempt
- JE = Junior exempt
- JR = Junior Accelerator Programme entrant
- CO = College Accelerator Programme entrant
- NG = Next Gen Accelerator Program entrant
- w/o = Walkover
- r = Retired
- d = Defaulted

=== Finals ===
Semifinals
(Netherlands) Robin Haase (Netherlands) Wesley Koolhof	7^{7}	7^{9}
(India) Rohan Bopanna (Canada) Denis Shapovalov	6^{3}	6^{7}
(Spain) Marcel Granollers (Argentina) Horacio Zeballos	7^{9}	3	[10]
(United States) Rajeev Ram (United Kingdom) Joe Salisbury	6^{7}	6	[7]

Final
(Netherlands) Robin Haase (Netherlands) Wesley Koolhof	5	5
(Spain) Marcel Granollers (Argentina) Horacio Zeballos	7	7

=== Top half ===
First round
1	(Colombia) JS Cabal (Colombia) R Farah	5	6^{4}
(Netherlands) R Haase (Netherlands) W Koolhof	7	7^{7}
(Australia) A de Minaur (Australia) J Thompson	6	7^{7}
(Poland) H Hurkacz (United States) J Isner	4	6^{3}
(Austria) O Marach (Austria) J Melzer	6^{5}	7^{7}	[6]
(United States) A Krajicek (New Zealand) M Venus	7^{7}	6^{5}	[10]
(Argentina) G Pella (Argentina) D Schwartzman	3	3
7	(United States) B Bryan (United States) M Bryan	6	6
4	(France) N Mahut (France) É Roger-Vasselin	6	1	[6]
(India) R Bopanna (Canada) D Shapovalov	4	6	[10]
(Georgia (country)) N Basilashvili (Germany) J-L Struff	3	4
(United Kingdom) K Edmund (United States) T Fritz	6	6
(France) B Paire (Switzerland) S Wawrinka	6	7^{9}
(Italy) F Fognini (France) L Pouille	4	6^{7}
(Germany) K Krawietz (Germany) A Mies	7	4	[10]
8	(Croatia) N Mektić (Croatia) F Škugor	5	6	[6]

Second round
(Netherlands) R Haase (Netherlands) W Koolhof	6	6
(Australia) A de Minaur (Australia) J Thompson	2	2
(United States) A Krajicek (New Zealand) M Venus	5	6^{6}
7	(United States) B Bryan (United States) M Bryan	7	7^{8}
(India) R Bopanna (Canada) D Shapovalov	6	6
(United Kingdom) K Edmund (United States) T Fritz	3	4
(France) B Paire (Switzerland) S Wawrinka	6	3	[10]
(Germany) K Krawietz (Germany) A Mies	3	6	[8]

Quarterfinals
(Netherlands) R Haase (Netherlands) W Koolhof	6^{8}	7^{7}	[10]
7	(United States) B Bryan (United States) M Bryan	7^{10}	6^{5}	[5]
(India) R Bopanna (Canada) D Shapovalov	w/o
(France) B Paire (Switzerland) S Wawrinka

Semifinals
(Netherlands) R Haase (Netherlands) W Koolhof	7^{7}	7^{9}
(India) R Bopanna (Canada) D Shapovalov	6^{3}	6^{7}

=== Bottom half ===
First round
6	(Finland) H Kontinen (Australia) J Peers	6^{3}	6	[15]
(Moldova) R Albot (Russia) K Khachanov	7^{7}	2	[13]
(Spain) M Granollers (Argentina) H Zeballos	3	7^{7}	[10]
(Croatia) I Dodig (Slovakia) F Polášek	6	6^{5}	[3]
WC	(Canada) P Polansky (Canada) B Schnur	6	7^{7}
(New Zealand) M Daniell (Serbia) L Đere	4	6^{3}
(Russia) A Rublev (Germany) A Zverev	6	7^{7}
3	(Croatia) M Pavić (Brazil) B Soares	3	6^{3}
5	(Netherlands) J-J Rojer (Romania) H Tecău	6	6
Alt	(Chile) C Garín (United Kingdom) C Norrie	3	3
(United Kingdom) J Murray (United Kingdom) N Skupski	5	5
(United States) R Ram (United Kingdom) J Salisbury	7	7
WC	(Canada) F Auger-Aliassime (Canada) V Pospisil	6^{7}	5
(France) J Chardy (France) F Martin	7^{9}	7
WC	(Spain) F López (United Kingdom) A Murray	6^{5}	6	[11]
2	(Poland) Ł Kubot (Brazil) M Melo	7^{7}	3	[9]

Second round
6	(Finland) H Kontinen (Australia) J Peers	4	2
(Spain) M Granollers (Argentina) H Zeballos	6	6
WC	(Canada) P Polansky (Canada) B Schnur	6	1	[8]
(Russia) A Rublev (Germany) A Zverev	1	6	[10]
5	(Netherlands) J-J Rojer (Romania) H Tecău	3	6^{6}
(United States) R Ram (United Kingdom) J Salisbury	6	7^{8}
(France) J Chardy (France) F Martin	2	6	[10]
WC	(Spain) F López (United Kingdom) A Murray	6	3	[8]

Quarterfinals
(Spain) M Granollers (Argentina) H Zeballos	6	6
(Russia) A Rublev (Germany) A Zverev	4	4
(United States) R Ram (United Kingdom) J Salisbury	6	6^{5}	[10]
(France) J Chardy (France) F Martin	4	7^{7}	[7]

Semifinals
(Spain) M Granollers (Argentina) H Zeballos	7^{9}	3	[10]
(United States) R Ram (United Kingdom) J Salisbury	6^{7}	6	[7]
