= Alexa Guarachi =

Chilean tennis player (born 1990)

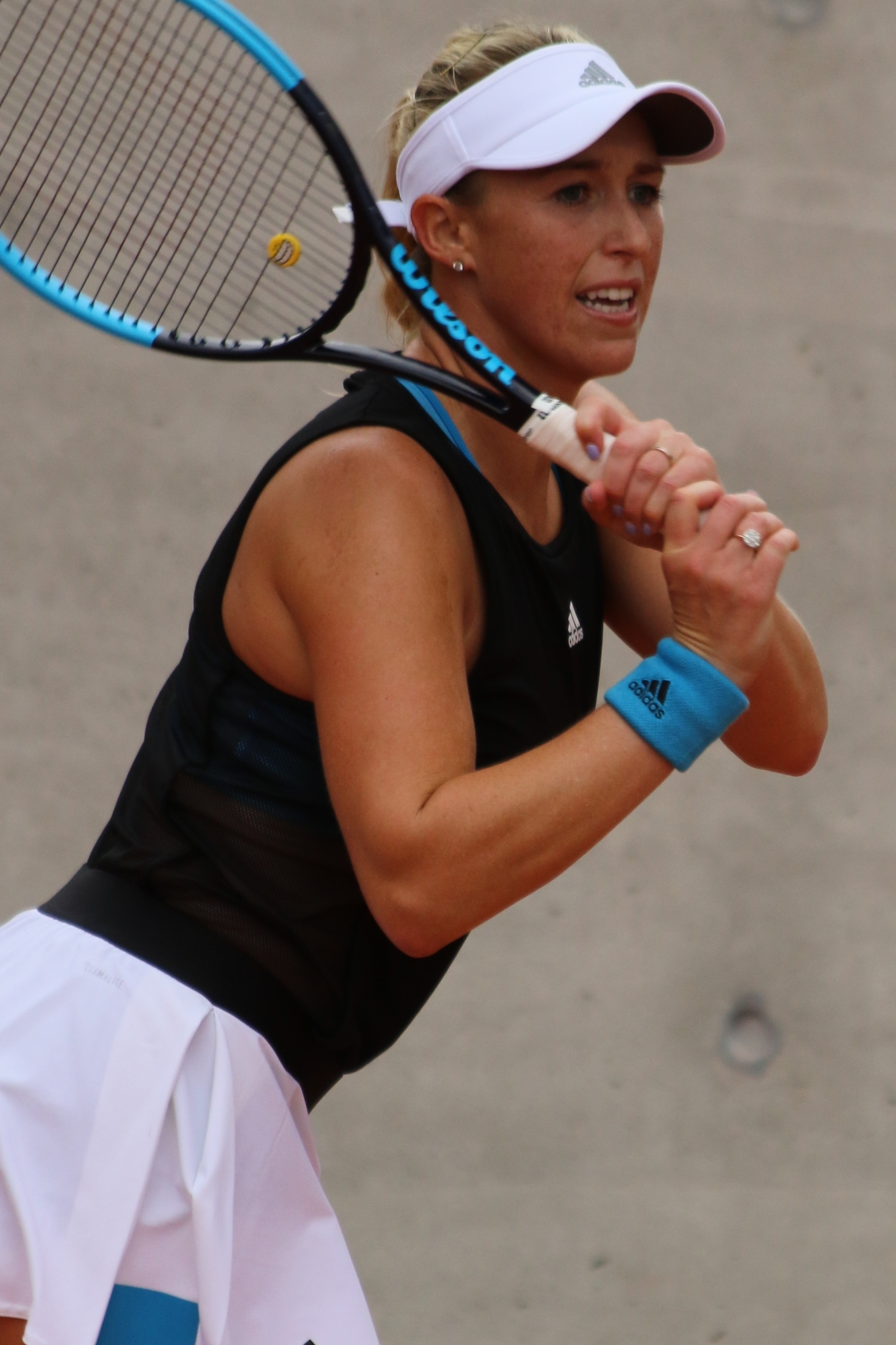
- Guarachi at the 2019 French Open
- Full name: Alexa Guarachi Bruner
- Country (sports): Chile (since June 2015); United States (2005–May 2015)
- Born: 17 November 1990 (age 35) Fort Walton Beach, Florida
- Height: 1.74 m (5 ft 9 in)
- Retired: April 2024 (first time)
- Plays: Right-handed
- College: University of Alabama (2010–2013)
- Prize money: US$ 1,043,928

Singles
- Career record: 134–123
- Career titles: 0 WTA, 1 ITF
- Highest ranking: No. 347 (2 November 2015)

Doubles
- Career record: 261–197
- Career titles: 5
- Highest ranking: No. 11 (20 September 2021)
- Current ranking: No. 378 (2 November 2026)

Grand Slam doubles results
- Australian Open: 3R (2021, 2022)
- French Open: F (2020)
- Wimbledon: QF (2022)
- US Open: SF (2021)

Other doubles tournaments
- Tour Finals: RR (2021)

Grand Slam mixed doubles results
- Australian Open: 2R (2022)
- French Open: QF (2021)
- Wimbledon: 2R (2021)
- US Open: QF (2021)

Team competitions
- Fed Cup: 13–7 (doubles 11-5)
Medal record
Representing Chile
Women's tennis
Pan American Games
Gold medal – first place	2019 Lima	Mixed doubles
South American Games
Gold medal – first place	2018 Cochabamba	Women's doubles
Bronze medal – third place	2018 Cochabamba	Mixed doubles
- Last updated on: 5 November 2026.

Alexa Guarachi Bruner (née Guarachi (Spanish pronunciation: [aˈleksa ɣwaˈɾatʃi], (Note: In isolation, Guarachi is pronounced [ɡwaˈɾatʃi].) born 17 November 1990) is an American-born Chilean professional tennis player specialising in doubles. She reached a career-high doubles ranking of world No. 11 in September 2021, and has won five WTA Tour titles, most notably the 2021 Dubai Championships alongside Darija Jurak. Guarachi reached her only Grand Slam tournament final at the 2020 French Open with Desirae Krawczyk, and the pair were semifinalists at the 2021 US Open. They also qualified for the 2021 WTA Finals.

Guarachi acquired Chilean citizenship in late 2014 and represented Chile in the Fed Cup, later Billie Jean King Cup, starting in 2018. She announced her retirement from professional tennis in April 2024. Following the birth of her son, Guarachi returned to the professional tour at the 2026 ATX Open partnering Emily Appleton in the doubles draw.

== Performance timelines ==
Key
W	F	SF	QF	#R	RR	Q#	DNQ	A	NH

(W) winner; (F) finalist; (SF) semifinalist; (QF) quarterfinalist; (#R) rounds 4, 3, 2, 1; (RR) round-robin stage; (Q#) qualification round; (DNQ) did not qualify; (A) absent; (NH) not held; (SR) strike rate (events won / competed); (W–L) win–loss record.
To avoid confusion and double counting, these charts are updated at the conclusion of a tournament or when the player's participation has ended.

Only main-draw results in WTA Tour, Grand Slam tournaments, Fed Cup/Billie Jean King Cup and Olympic Games are included in win–loss records.

=== Doubles ===
Tournament	2017	2018	2019	2020	2021	2022	2023	SR	W–L	Win%
Grand Slam tournaments
Australian Open	A	A	1R	2R	3R	3R	2R	0 / 5	6–5	55%
French Open	A	A	1R	F	1R	1R	1R	0 / 5	5–5	50%
Wimbledon	A	1R	1R	NH	1R	QF	1R	0 / 5	3–5	38%
US Open	A	1R	3R	1R	SF	3R	1R	0 / 6	8–6	57%
Win–Loss	0–0	0–2	2–4	6–3	6–4	7–4	1–4	0 / 21	22–21	51%
Year-end championships
WTA Finals	DNQ			NH	RR			0 / 1	1–2	33%
WTA 1000
Qatar Open	NTI	A	NTI	1R	NTI	2R	NTI	0 / 2	1–2	67%
Dubai Championships	A	NTI	A	NTI	W	NTI	1R	1 / 2	5–1	67%
Indian Wells Open	A	A	A	NH	2R	1R	2R	0 / 3	2–3	40%
Miami Open	A	A	A	NH	1R	2R	1R	0 / 3	1–3	25%
Madrid Open	A	A	A	NH	2R	1R	1R	0 / 3	1–3	25%
Italian Open	A	A	A	1R	1R	QF	1R	0 / 4	1–4	20%
Canadian Open	A	A	1R	NH	QF	QF	1R	0 / 4	3–4	43%
Cincinnati Open	A	A	A	A	1R	1R	A	0 / 2	0–2	0%
China Open	A	A	A	NH			A	0 / 0	0–0	–
Wuhan Open	A	A	A	NH				0 / 0	0–0	–
Guadalajara Open	NH					1R	QF	0 / 1	1–2	33%
Career statistics
Tournaments	2	6	20	13	24	22	14	Career total: 101		
Titles	0	1	0	1	3	0	0	Career total: 5		
Finals	0	2	3	3	3	0	0	Career total: 11		
Overall win–loss	0–2	9–6	19–20	18–12	29–22	20–22	10–16	5 / 101	105–101	51%
Year-end ranking	151	78	59	26	13	42	69	$997,913		

=== Mixed doubles ===
Tournament	2019	2020	2021	2022	2023	SR	W–L	Win%
Australian Open	A	A	1R	2R	A	0 / 2	1–2	33%
French Open	A	A	QF	1R	A	0 / 2	2–2	50%
Wimbledon	1R	NH	2R	1R	A	0 / 3	1–3	25%
US Open	A	A	QF	1R	1R	0 / 3	2–3	40%
Win–Loss	0–1	0–0	5–4	1–4	0–1	0 / 10	6–10	38%

== Grand Slam tournament finals ==
=== Doubles: 1 (runner-up) ===
Result	Year	Tournament	Surface	Partner	Opponents	Score
Loss	2020	French Open	Clay	(United States) Desirae Krawczyk	(Hungary) Tímea Babos (France) Kristina Mladenovic	4–6, 5–7

== Other significant finals ==
=== WTA 1000 tournaments ===
==== Doubles: 1 (title) ====
Result	Year	Tournament	Surface	Partner	Opponents	Score
Win	2021	Dubai Championships	Hard	(Croatia) Darija Jurak	(China) Xu Yifan (China) Yang Zhaoxuan	6–0, 6–3

== WTA Tour finals ==
=== Doubles: 12 (5 titles, 7 runner-ups) ===
Legend Grand Slam (0–1) WTA 1000 (1–0) Premier / WTA 500 (1–2) International / WTA 250 (3–4)	Finals by surface Hard (2–5) Clay (3–2)

Result	W–L	Date	Tournament	Tier	Surface	Partner	Opponents	Score
Win	1–0	Jul 2018	Championship Gstaad, Switzerland	International	Clay	(United States) Desirae Krawczyk	(Spain) Lara Arruabarrena (Switzerland) Timea Bacsinszky	4–6, 6–4, [10–6]
Loss	1–1	Aug 2018	Washington Open, United States	International	Hard	(New Zealand) Erin Routliffe	(China) Han Xinyun (Croatia) Darija Jurak	3–6, 2–6
Loss	1–2	Apr 2019	İstanbul Cup, Turkey	International	Clay	(United States) Sabrina Santamaria	(Hungary) Tímea Babos (France) Kristina Mladenovic	1–6, 0–6
Loss	1–3	Sep 2019	Guangzhou International, China	International	Hard	(Mexico) Giuliana Olmos	(China) Peng Shuai (Germany) Laura Siegemund	2–6, 1–6
Loss	1–4	Oct 2019	Luxembourg Open, Luxembourg	International	Hard (i)	(United States) Kaitlyn Christian	(United States) Coco Gauff (United States) Caty McNally	2–6, 2–6
Loss	1–5	Feb 2020	St. Petersburg Trophy, Russia	Premier	Hard (i)	(United States) Kaitlyn Christian	(Japan) Shuko Aoyama (Japan) Ena Shibahara	6–4, 0–6, [3–10]
Win	2–5	Sep 2020	İstanbul Cup, Turkey	International	Clay	(United States) Desirae Krawczyk	(Australia) Ellen Perez (Australia) Storm Sanders	6–1, 6–3
Loss	2–6	Oct 2020	French Open	Grand Slam	Clay	(United States) Desirae Krawczyk	(Hungary) Tímea Babos (France) Kristina Mladenovic	4–6, 5–7
Win	3–6	Feb 2021	Adelaide International, Australia	WTA 500	Hard	(United States) Desirae Krawczyk	(United States) Hayley Carter (Brazil) Luisa Stefani	6–7^{(4–7)}, 6–4, [10–3]
Win	4–6	Mar 2021	Dubai Championships, UAE	WTA 1000	Hard	(Croatia) Darija Jurak	(China) Xu Yifan (China) Yang Zhaoxuan	6–0, 6–3
Win	5–6	May 2021	Internationaux de Strasbourg, France	WTA 250	Clay	(United States) Desirae Krawczyk	(Japan) Makoto Ninomiya (China) Yang Zhaoxuan	6–2, 6–3
Loss	5–7	Aug 2023	Washington Open, US	WTA 500	Hard	(Romania) Monica Niculescu	(Germany) Laura Siegemund; Vera Zvonareva	4–6, 4–6

== WTA 125 finals ==
=== Doubles: 2 (2 runner-ups) ===
Result	W–L	Date	Tournament	Surface	Partner	Opponents	Score
Loss	0–1	Mar 2019	Båstad Open, Sweden	Clay	(Montenegro) Danka Kovinić	(Japan) Misaki Doi (Russia) Natalia Vikhlyantseva	5–7, 7–6^{(7–4)}, [7–10]
Loss	0–2	May 2023	Catalonia Open, Spain	Clay	(New Zealand) Erin Routliffe	(Australia) Storm Hunter (Australia) Ellen Perez	1–6, 6–7^{(8–10)}

== ITF Circuit finals ==
Legend
$100,000 tournaments
$80,000 tournaments
$60,000 tournaments
$25,000 tournaments
$10/15,000 tournaments

=== Singles: 3 (1 title, 2 runner-ups) ===
Result	W–L	Date	Tournament	Tier	Surface	Opponent	Score
Loss	0–1	May 2014	ITF Antalya, Turkey	10,000	Hard	(France) Océane Dodin	6–4, 4–6, 3–6
Win	1–1	July 2014	ITF Vancouver, Canada	10,000	Hard	(Japan) Yuka Higuchi	6–3, 1–6, 7–6^{(8–6)}
Loss	1–2	Sep 2015	ITF Monterrey, Mexico	25,000	Hard	(Croatia) Tereza Mrdeža	0–6, 7–6^{(7–2)}, 3–6

=== Doubles: 28 (20 titles, 8 runner-ups) ===
Result	W–L	Date	Tournament	Tier	Surface	Partner	Opponents	Score
Loss	0–1	May 2014	ITF Antalya, Turkey	10,000	Hard	(United States) Kate Turvy	(Mexico) Victoria Rodríguez (Mexico) Marcela Zacarías	1–6, 6–1, [4–10]
Win	1–1	May 2014	ITF Antalya, Turkey	10,000	Hard	(United States) Kate Turvy	(Serbia) Barbara Bonić (Mexico) Ximena Hermoso	6–3, 7–6^{(8)}
Loss	1–2	Jun 2014	ITF Civitavecchia, Italy	10,000	Clay	(Australia) Sally Peers	(Italy) Martina Caregaro (Italy) Anna Floris	4–6, 4–6
Loss	1–3	Jul 2014	ITF Vancouver, Canada	10,000	Hard	(United States) Lauren Albanese	(Japan) Yuka Higuchi (Japan) Hirono Watanabe	6–4, 2–6, [5–10]
Loss	1–4	Jul 2014	ITF Austin, United States	10,000	Hard	(United States) Alexandra Cercone	(United States) Catherine Harrison (United States) Mary Weatherholt	2–6, 5–7
Loss	1–5	Aug 2014	ITF Rosarito Beach, Mexico	10,000	Hard	(United States) Alexandra Cercone	(Mexico) Victoria Rodríguez (Mexico) Marcela Zacarías	4–6, 1–6
Win	2–5	Oct 2014	ITF Oslo, Norway	10,000	Hard (i)	(Serbia) Nina Stojanović	(Ukraine) Maryna Kolb (Ukraine) Nadiya Kolb	6–4, 7–6^{(7)}
Win	3–5	Nov 2014	ITF Oslo, Norway	10,000	Hard (i)	(Russia) Daria Lodikova	(Ukraine) Maryna Kolb (Ukraine) Nadiya Kolb	6–3, 2–6, [10–6]
Win	4–5	Dec 2014	ITF Santiago, Chile	25,000	Hard	(United States) Lauren Albanese	(Chile) Fernanda Brito (Brazil) Eduarda Piai	6–4, 6–1
Win	5–5	Jan 2015	ITF Fort-de-France, France	10,000	Hard	(France) Shérazad Reix	(Canada) Rosie Johanson (Canada) Gloria Liang	6–2, 6–1
Win	6–5	Jan 2015	ITF Saint Martin, Guadeloupe	10,000	Hard	(Japan) Ayaka Okuno	(United States) Lena Litvak (Canada) Sonja Molnar	7–5, 6–3
Win	7–5	Apr 2015	ITF Jackson, United States	25,000	Clay	(United States) Caitlin Whoriskey	(Czech Republic) Kateřina Kramperová (Australia) Jessica Moore	6–7^{(4)}, 6–3, [11–9]
Win	8–5	Jul 2015	ITF El Paso, United States	25,000	Hard	(United States) Jennifer Brady	(United States) Robin Anderson (United States) Maegan Manasse	3–6, 6–3, [10–7]
Loss	8–6	Sep 2015	ITF Monterrey, Mexico	25,000	Hard	(Chinese Taipei) Hsu Chieh-yu	(Slovenia) Tadeja Majerič (Switzerland) Conny Perrin	5–7, 3–6
Win	9–6	Feb 2017	ITF Manacor, Spain	15,000	Clay	(United States) Lauren Embree	(United States) Jaeda Daniel (United States) Quinn Gleason	6–1, 7–5
Win	10–6	Mar 2017	ITF Tampa, United States	15,000	Clay	(Chinese Taipei) Hsu Chieh-yu	(United States) Emina Bektas (United States) Sanaz Marand	6–3, 4–6, [10–4]
Loss	10–7	Apr 2017	ITF Jackson, US	25,000	Clay	(United States) Ronit Yurovsky	(Russia) Alla Kudryavtseva (Germany) Anna Zaja	2–6, 0–6
Win	11–7	May 2017	Charleston Pro, US	60,000	Clay	(United States) Emina Bektas	(United States) Kaitlyn Christian (United States) Sabrina Santamaria	5–7, 6–3, [10–5]
Win	12–7	May 2017	ITF Naples, US	25,000	Clay	(United States) Emina Bektas	(United States) Sophie Chang (Norway) Ulrikke Eikeri	6–3, 6–1
Win	13–7	Jul 2017	ITF Auburn, US	25,000	Hard	(United States) Emina Bektas	(Australia) Ellen Perez (Brazil) Luisa Stefani	4–6, 6–4, [10–5]
Loss	13–8	Jul 2017	Challenger de Granby, Canada	60,000	Hard	(Australia) Olivia Tjandramulia	(Australia) Ellen Perez (Canada) Carol Zhao	2–6, 2–6
Win	14–8	Nov 2017	Toronto Challenger, Canada	60,000	Hard	(New Zealand) Erin Routliffe	(Belgium) Ysaline Bonaventure (Mexico) Victoria Rodríguez	7–6^{(4)}, 3–6, [10–4]
Win	15–8	Jan 2018	ITF Daytona Beach, US	25,000	Hard	(United States) Usue Maitane Arconada	(Norway) Ulrikke Eikeri (Belarus) Ilona Kremen	6–3, 6–4
Win	16–8	Mar 2018	ITF Irapuato, Mexico	25,000	Hard	(New Zealand) Erin Routliffe	(United States) Desirae Krawczyk (Mexico) Giuliana Olmos	4–6, 6–2, [10–6]
Win	17–8	Apr 2018	ITF Pelham, US	25,000	Clay	(New Zealand) Erin Routliffe	(United States) Maria Mateas (Mexico) María Portillo Ramírez	6–1, 6–2
Win	18–8	Apr 2018	Dothan Pro Classic, US	80,000	Clay	(New Zealand) Erin Routliffe	(United States) Sofia Kenin (United States) Jamie Loeb	6–4, 2–6, [11–9]
Win	19–8	May 2018	ITF Charleston Pro, US (2)	80,000	Clay	(New Zealand) Erin Routliffe	(United States) Louisa Chirico (United States) Allie Kiick	6–1, 3–6, [10–5]
Win	20–8	May 2019	Bonita Springs Championship, US	W100	Clay	(New Zealand) Erin Routliffe	(United States) Usue Maitane Arconada (United States) Caroline Dolehide	6–3, 7–6^{(5)}
