= 2021 WTA Finals – Doubles =

Doubles
- 2021 WTA Finals

Final
- Champions: (Czech Republic) Barbora Krejčíková (Czech Republic) Kateřina Siniaková
- Runners-up: (Chinese Taipei) Hsieh Su-wei (Belgium) Elise Mertens
- Score: 6–3, 6–4

Details
- Draw: 8 (round robin)

Events
Singles	Doubles
← 2019 ·	WTA Finals	· 2022 →

Barbora Krejčíková and Kateřina Siniaková defeated Hsieh Su-wei and Elise Mertens in the final, 6–3, 6–4 to win the doubles tennis title at the 2021 WTA Finals.

Tímea Babos and Kristina Mladenovic were the two-time reigning champions, but failed to qualify this year.

Krejčíková and Siniaková clinched the year-end no. 1 as a team with their win against Sharon Fichman and Giuliana Olmos in their first round-robin match, and Siniaková secured the individual year-end no. 1 ranking by winning the title. Hsieh was also in contention for the top ranking. Krejčíková was the only player in this edition to qualify for both the singles and doubles tournaments.

== Seeds ==
1. (Czech Republic) Barbora Krejčíková / (Czech Republic) Kateřina Siniaková (champions)
2. (Japan) Shuko Aoyama / (Japan) Ena Shibahara (semifinals)
3. (Chinese Taipei) Hsieh Su-wei / (Belgium) Elise Mertens (final)
4. (United States) Nicole Melichar-Martinez / (Netherlands) Demi Schuurs (semifinals)
5. (Australia) Samantha Stosur / (China) Zhang Shuai (round robin)
6. (Chile) Alexa Guarachi / (United States) Desirae Krawczyk (round robin)
7. (Croatia) Darija Jurak / (Slovenia) Andreja Klepač (round robin)
8. (Canada) Sharon Fichman / (Mexico) Giuliana Olmos (round robin)

== Alternates ==
1. (Ukraine) Nadiia Kichenok / (Romania) Raluca Olaru (Did not play)
2. (Czech Republic) Marie Bouzková / (Czech Republic) Lucie Hradecká (Did not play)

== Draw ==
=== Key ===
- Q = Qualifier
- WC = Wild card
- LL = Lucky loser
- Alt = Alternate
- SE = Special exempt
- PR = Protected ranking
- ITF = ITF entry
- JE = Junior exempt
- w/o = Walkover
- r = Retired
- d = Defaulted
- SR = Special ranking

=== Finals ===
Semifinals
1	(Czech Republic) Barbora Krejčíková (Czech Republic) Kateřina Siniaková	3	6	[10]
4	(United States) Nicole Melichar-Martinez (Netherlands) Demi Schuurs	6	3	[6]
2	(Japan) Shuko Aoyama (Japan) Ena Shibahara	2	2
3	(Chinese Taipei) Hsieh Su-wei (Belgium) Elise Mertens	6	6

Final
1	(Czech Republic) Barbora Krejčíková (Czech Republic) Kateřina Siniaková	6	6
3	(Chinese Taipei) Hsieh Su-wei (Belgium) Elise Mertens	3	4

=== Group El Tajín ===
		(Czech Republic) Krejčíková (Czech Republic) Siniaková	(Chinese Taipei) Hsieh (Belgium) Mertens	(Chile) Guarachi (United States) Krawczyk	(Canada) Fichman (Mexico) Olmos	RR W–L	Set W–L	Game W–L	Standings
1	(Czech Republic) Barbora Krejčíková (Czech Republic) Kateřina Siniaková		6–3, 6–1	5–7, 7–6^{(7–3)}, [10–7]	6–4, 6–1	3–0	6–1 (86%)	37–22 (63%)	1
3	(Chinese Taipei) Hsieh Su-wei (Belgium) Elise Mertens	3–6, 1–6		7–6^{(7–3)}, 6–2	6–4, 7–6^{(7–3)}	2–1	4–2 (67%)	30–30 (50%)	2
6	(Chile) Alexa Guarachi (United States) Desirae Krawczyk	7–5, 6–7^{(3–7)}, [7–10]	6–7^{(3–7)}, 2–6		0–6, 6–3, [11–9]	1–2	3–5 (38%)	28–35 (44%)	3
8	(Canada) Sharon Fichman (Mexico) Giuliana Olmos	4–6, 1–6	4–6, 6–7^{(3–7)}	6–0, 3–6, [9–11]		0–3	1–6 (14%)	24–32 (43%)	4

=== Group Tenochtitlán ===
		(Japan) Aoyama (Japan) Shibahara	(United States) Melichar-Martinez (Netherlands) Schuurs	(Australia) Stosur (China) Zhang	(Croatia) Jurak (Slovenia) Klepač	RR W–L	Set W–L	Game W–L	Standings
2	(Japan) Shuko Aoyama (Japan) Ena Shibahara		6–4, 7–6^{(7–5)}	6–4, 3–6, [7–10]	6–0, 6–4	2–1	5–2 (71%)	34–25 (58%)	1
4	(United States) Nicole Melichar-Martinez (Netherlands) Demi Schuurs	4–6, 6–7^{(5–7)}		6–2, 6–2	6–4, 3–6, [10–2]	2–1	4–3 (57%)	32–27 (54%)	2
5	(Australia) Samantha Stosur (China) Zhang Shuai	4–6, 6–3, [10–7]	2–6, 2–6		7–6^{(12–10)}, 6–7^{(4–7)}, [5–10]	1–2	3–5 (38%)	28–35 (44%)	4
7	(Croatia) Darija Jurak (Slovenia) Andreja Klepač	0–6, 4–6	4–6, 6–3, [2–10]	6–7^{(10–12)}, 7–6^{(7–4)}, [10–5]		1–2	3–5 (38%)	28–35 (44%)	3

Standings are determined by: 1. number of wins; 2. number of matches; 3. in two-player ties, head-to-head records; 4. in three-player ties, (a) percentage of sets won (head-to-head records if two players remain tied), then (b) percentage of games won (head-to-head records if two players remain tied), then (c) WTA rankings.
