= 2022 Wimbledon Championships – Women's doubles =

Women's doubles
- 2022 Wimbledon Championships

Final
- Champions: (Czech Republic) Barbora Krejčíková (Czech Republic) Kateřina Siniaková
- Runners-up: (Belgium) Elise Mertens (China) Zhang Shuai
- Score: 6–2, 6–4

Events
Singles	men	women		boys	girls
Doubles	men	women	mixed	boys	girls
WC Singles	men	women	quad
WC Doubles	men	women	quad
Legends	men	women	mixed
14&U Singles	boys	girls
← 2021 ·	Wimbledon Championships	· 2023 →

Barbora Krejčíková and Kateřina Siniaková defeated the defending champion Elise Mertens and her partner Zhang Shuai in the final, 6–2, 6–4 to win the ladies' doubles tennis title at the 2022 Wimbledon Championships. It was their second Wimbledon title together and fifth major title together overall.

Hsieh Su-wei was the two-time defending champion, but she did not return to compete.

Samantha Stosur was attempting to complete the career Grand Slam, but she lost in the first round to Aliona Bolsova and Ingrid Neel.

This was the first edition of Wimbledon to feature a champions (Note: also referred to as super tie-break) tiebreak (10-point tiebreak), when the score reaches six games all in the third set, and the third edition to feature a final-set tiebreak. (Note: Previous there was no tie-break in the third set.) Jule Niemeier, Andrea Petkovic, Miyu Kato, and Aldila Sutjiadi were the first players to contest this tiebreak in the ladies' doubles event, with the team of Niemeier and Petkovic winning the tiebreak 14–12 in their first-round match.

== Seeds ==
1. (Belgium) Elise Mertens / (China) Zhang Shuai (final)
2. (Czech Republic) Barbora Krejčíková / (Czech Republic) Kateřina Siniaková (champions)
3. (Canada) Gabriela Dabrowski / (Mexico) Giuliana Olmos (third round)
4. (Ukraine) Lyudmyla Kichenok / (Latvia) Jeļena Ostapenko (semifinals)
5. (United States) Asia Muhammad / (Japan) Ena Shibahara (third round)
6. (Czech Republic) Lucie Hradecká / (India) Sania Mirza (first round)
7. (Chile) Alexa Guarachi / (Slovenia) Andreja Klepač (quarterfinals)
8. (Japan) Shuko Aoyama / (Chinese Taipei) Chan Hao-ching (quarterfinals)

9. (China) Xu Yifan / (China) Yang Zhaoxuan (third round)
10. (United States) Nicole Melichar-Martinez / (Australia) Ellen Perez (quarterfinals)
11. (Poland) Alicja Rosolska / (New Zealand) Erin Routliffe (quarterfinals)
12. (Chinese Taipei) Latisha Chan / (Australia) Samantha Stosur (first round)
13. (Georgia (country)) Natela Dzalamidze / (Serbia) Aleksandra Krunić (second round)
14. (Romania) Monica Niculescu / (Romania) Elena-Gabriela Ruse (first round)
15. (Ukraine) Nadiia Kichenok / (Romania) Raluca Olaru (third round)
16. (Czech Republic) Marie Bouzková / (Slovakia) Tereza Mihalíková (second round)

Click on the seed number of a player to go to their draw section.

== Draw ==
=== Key ===
- Q = Qualifier
- WC = Wild card
- LL = Lucky loser
- Alt = Alternate
- ITF = ITF entry
- PR = Protected ranking
- SR = Special ranking
- SE = Special exempt
- JE = Junior exempt
- JR = Junior Accelerator Programme entrant
- CO = College Accelerator Programme entrant
- NG = Next Gen Accelerator Program entrant
- w/o = Walkover
- r = Retired
- d = Defaulted

=== Finals ===
Quarterfinals
1	(Belgium) Elise Mertens (China) Zhang Shuai	6	6
7	(Chile) Alexa Guarachi (Slovenia) Andreja Klepač	3	2
(United States) Danielle Collins (United States) Desirae Krawczyk	6	6^{4}	6
11	(Poland) Alicja Rosolska (New Zealand) Erin Routliffe	1	7^{7}	3
8	(Japan) Shuko Aoyama (Chinese Taipei) Chan Hao-ching	6	1	5
4	(Ukraine) Lyudmyla Kichenok (Latvia) Jeļena Ostapenko	4	6	7
10	(United States) Nicole Melichar-Martinez (Australia) Ellen Perez	6	6^{2}	2
2	(Czech Republic) Barbora Krejčíková (Czech Republic) Kateřina Siniaková	1	7^{7}	6

Semifinals
1	(Belgium) Elise Mertens (China) Zhang Shuai	6	3	6
(United States) Danielle Collins (United States) Desirae Krawczyk	2	6	3
4	(Ukraine) Lyudmyla Kichenok (Latvia) Jeļena Ostapenko	2	2
2	(Czech Republic) Barbora Krejčíková (Czech Republic) Kateřina Siniaková	6	6

Final
1	(Belgium) Elise Mertens (China) Zhang Shuai	2	4
2	(Czech Republic) Barbora Krejčíková (Czech Republic) Kateřina Siniaková	6	6

=== Top half ===
==== Section 1 ====
First round
1	(Belgium) E Mertens (China) S Zhang	6	6
(Hungary) A Bondár (Belgium) G Minnen	3	1
(Switzerland) V Golubic (Colombia) C Osorio	7	6
WC	(United Kingdom) S Kartal (United Kingdom) N Miller	5	4
(Estonia) K Kanepi (Czech Republic) R Voráčová	1	6	2
WC	(United Kingdom) A Barnett (United Kingdom) O Nicholls	6	4	6
Alt	(Greece) V Grammatikopoulou (Thailand) P Plipuech	2	3
15	(Ukraine) N Kichenok (Romania) R Olaru	6	6
9	(China) Y Xu (China) Z Yang	6	6
(Italy) L Bronzetti (Germany) J Lohoff	3	4
(Germany) J Niemeier (Germany) A Petkovic	7^{7}	5	7^{14}
(Japan) M Kato (Indonesia) A Sutjiadi	6^{3}	7	6^{12}
(France) A Cornet (France) D Parry	6	6^{6}	6
(Poland) M Linette (United States) B Pera	1	7^{8}	4
PR	(Australia) M Adamczak (Poland) K Kawa	3	4
7	(Chile) A Guarachi (Slovenia) A Klepač	6	6

Second round
1	(Belgium) E Mertens (China) S Zhang	6	6
(Switzerland) V Golubic (Colombia) C Osorio	3	2
WC	(United Kingdom) A Barnett (United Kingdom) O Nicholls	6	4	6^{5}
15	(Ukraine) N Kichenok (Romania) R Olaru	3	6	7^{10}
9	(China) Y Xu (China) Z Yang	6	0	7
(Germany) J Niemeier (Germany) A Petkovic	3	6	5
(France) A Cornet (France) D Parry	3	2
7	(Chile) A Guarachi (Slovenia) A Klepač	6	6

Third round
1	(Belgium) E Mertens (China) S Zhang	6	6
15	(Ukraine) N Kichenok (Romania) R Olaru	4	3
9	(China) Y Xu (China) Z Yang	3	5
7	(Chile) A Guarachi (Slovenia) A Klepač	6	7

Quarterfinals
1	(Belgium) E Mertens (China) S Zhang	6	6
7	(Chile) A Guarachi (Slovenia) A Klepač	3	2

==== Section 2 ====
First round
3	(Canada) G Dabrowski (Mexico) G Olmos	6^{2}	6	6
PR	(Kazakhstan) Y Putintseva (Belgium) Y Wickmayer	7^{7}	3	2
(Ukraine) M Kostyuk (Czech Republic) T Martincová	6	6
(United States) M Brengle (United States) L Davis	3	4
(Romania) I Bara (Georgia (country)) E Gorgodze	3	2
(United States) D Collins (United States) D Krawczyk	6	6
(Georgia (country)) O Kalashnikova (Poland) K Piter	6	6^{5}	4
16	(Czech Republic) M Bouzková (Slovakia) T Mihalíková	3	7^{7}	6
11	(Poland) A Rosolska (New Zealand) E Routliffe	6	6
(Romania) I-C Begu (Ukraine) A Kalinina	4	4
(United States) C Harrison (United States) S Santamaria	2	6	5
(Slovenia) K Juvan (Slovenia) T Zidanšek	6	4	2^{r}
(France) C Burel (France) C Paquet	3	6^{5}
Alt	(China) X Han (China) L Zhu	6	7^{7}
WC	(United Kingdom) SB Grey (United Kingdom) Y Miyazaki	1	1
5	(United States) A Muhammad (Japan) E Shibahara	6	6

Second round
3	(Canada) G Dabrowski (Mexico) G Olmos	7	3	6
(Ukraine) M Kostyuk (Czech Republic) T Martincová	5	6	3
(United States) D Collins (United States) D Krawczyk	6	6
16	(Czech Republic) M Bouzková (Slovakia) T Mihalíková	1	3
11	(Poland) A Rosolska (New Zealand) E Routliffe	6^{3}	7	7^{10}
(United States) C Harrison (United States) S Santamaria	7^{7}	5	6^{7}
Alt	(China) X Han (China) L Zhu	1	4
5	(United States) A Muhammad (Japan) E Shibahara	6	6

Third round
3	(Canada) G Dabrowski (Mexico) G Olmos	4	3
(United States) D Collins (United States) D Krawczyk	6	6
11	(Poland) A Rosolska (New Zealand) E Routliffe	6	7^{7}
5	(United States) A Muhammad (Japan) E Shibahara	4	6^{3}

Quarterfinals
(United States) D Collins (United States) D Krawczyk	6	6^{4}	6
11	(Poland) A Rosolska (New Zealand) E Routliffe	1	7^{7}	3

=== Bottom half ===
==== Section 3 ====
First round
8	(Japan) S Aoyama (Chinese Taipei) H-c Chan	7	6
(China) Xiy Wang (China) Q Zheng	5	3
(Italy) J Paolini (Italy) M Trevisan	1	5
WC	(United Kingdom) N Bains (United Kingdom) M Lumsden	6	7
(Norway) U Eikeri (Australia) A Sharma	6	4	4
(United States) A Riske-Amritraj (United States) C Vandeweghe	0	6	6
(Spain) A Bolsova (United States) I Neel	7^{7}	6
12	(Chinese Taipei) L Chan (Australia) S Stosur	6^{4}	1
13	(Georgia (country)) N Dzalamidze (Serbia) A Krunić	6	7
Alt	(Germany) A-L Friedsam (United States) A Li	3	5
(United States) E Bektas (Slovakia) K Kučová	2	4
WC	(United Kingdom) H Dart (United Kingdom) H Watson	6	6
WC	(United Kingdom) J Burrage (United Kingdom) E Silva	3	4
(Netherlands) A Hartono (Netherlands) D Schuurs	6	6
(France) O Dodin (Germany) T Maria	6	5	3
4	(Ukraine) L Kichenok (Latvia) J Ostapenko	2	7	6

Second round
8	(Japan) S Aoyama (Chinese Taipei) H-c Chan	6	6
WC	(United Kingdom) N Bains (United Kingdom) M Lumsden	1	4
(United States) A Riske-Amritraj (United States) C Vandeweghe	7^{7}	6
(Spain) A Bolsova (United States) I Neel	6^{1}	3
13	(Georgia (country)) N Dzalamidze (Serbia) A Krunić	4	2
WC	(United Kingdom) H Dart (United Kingdom) H Watson	6	6
(Netherlands) A Hartono (Netherlands) D Schuurs	2	6^{5}
4	(Ukraine) L Kichenok (Latvia) J Ostapenko	6	7^{7}

Third round
8	(Japan) S Aoyama (Chinese Taipei) H-c Chan	6	4	7^{10}
(United States) A Riske-Amritraj (United States) C Vandeweghe	4	6	6^{3}
WC	(United Kingdom) H Dart (United Kingdom) H Watson	7	4	2
4	(Ukraine) L Kichenok (Latvia) J Ostapenko	5	6	6

Quarterfinals
8	(Japan) S Aoyama (Chinese Taipei) H-c Chan	6	1	5
4	(Ukraine) L Kichenok (Latvia) J Ostapenko	4	6	7

==== Section 4 ====
First round
6	(Czech Republic) L Hradecká (India) S Mirza	6	4	2
(Poland) M Fręch (Brazil) B Haddad Maia	4	6	6
(Australia) D Saville (Australia) A Tomljanović	3	3
(Slovakia) V Kužmová (Netherlands) A Rus	6	6
Alt	(Italy) E Cocciaretto (Bulgaria) V Tomova	6	7^{7}
(Belgium) M Zanevska (Belgium) K Zimmermann	3	6^{2}
(United States) K Christian (Hungary) P Udvardy	3	5
10	(United States) N Melichar-Martinez (Australia) E Perez	6	7
14	(Romania) M Niculescu (Romania) E-G Ruse	6^{3}	2
(Belgium) K Flipkens (Spain) S Sorribes Tormo	7^{7}	6
(Hungary) D Gálfi (Ukraine) D Yastremska	2	7^{9}	6^{16}
(Switzerland) B Bencic (Australia) S Sanders	6	6^{7}	7^{18}
(Estonia) A Kontaveit (United States) S Rogers	6	6
(Germany) V Heisen (United Kingdom) S Murray Sharan	2	4
(France) E Lechemia (Spain) N Párrizas Díaz	1	1
2	(Czech Republic) B Krejčíková (Czech Republic) K Siniaková	6	6

Second round
(Poland) M Fręch (Brazil) B Haddad Maia	6	5	6
(Slovakia) V Kužmová (Netherlands) A Rus	4	7	3
Alt	(Italy) E Cocciaretto (Bulgaria) V Tomova	4	4
10	(United States) N Melichar-Martinez (Australia) E Perez	6	6
(Belgium) K Flipkens (Spain) S Sorribes Tormo	3	6	6
(Switzerland) B Bencic (Australia) S Sanders	6	3	2
(Estonia) A Kontaveit (United States) S Rogers	6^{8}	3
2	(Czech Republic) B Krejčíková (Czech Republic) K Siniaková	7^{10}	6

Third round
(Poland) M Fręch (Brazil) B Haddad Maia	1	1
10	(United States) N Melichar-Martinez (Australia) E Perez	6	6
(Belgium) K Flipkens (Spain) S Sorribes Tormo	6^{2}	4
2	(Czech Republic) B Krejčíková (Czech Republic) K Siniaková	7^{7}	6

Quarterfinals
10	(United States) N Melichar-Martinez (Australia) E Perez	6	6^{2}	2
2	(Czech Republic) B Krejčíková (Czech Republic) K Siniaková	1	7^{7}	6

== Other entry information ==
=== Wild cards ===
- (United Kingdom) Naiktha Bains / (United Kingdom) Maia Lumsden
- (United Kingdom) Alicia Barnett / (United Kingdom) Olivia Nicholls
- (United Kingdom) Jodie Burrage / (United Kingdom) Eden Silva
- (United Kingdom) Harriet Dart / (United Kingdom) Heather Watson
- (United Kingdom) Sarah Beth Grey / (United Kingdom) Yuriko Miyazaki
- (United Kingdom) Sonay Kartal / (United Kingdom) Nell Miller

=== Protected ranking ===
- (Australia) Monique Adamczak / (Poland) Katarzyna Kawa
- (Kazakhstan) Yulia Putintseva / (Belgium) Yanina Wickmayer

=== Alternates ===
- (Germany) Anna-Lena Friedsam / (United States) Ann Li
- (China) Han Xinyun / (China) Zhu Lin
- ~~(Germany) Tamara Korpatsch / (France) Harmony Tan~~
- (Greece) Valentini Grammatikopoulou / (Thailand) Peangtarn Plipuech
- (Italy) Elisabetta Cocciaretto / (Bulgaria) Viktoriya Tomova

=== Withdrawals ===
Before the tournament

- (Japan) Misaki Doi / (Japan) Makoto Ninomiya → replaced by (China) Han Xinyun / (China) Zhu Lin
- (Montenegro) Danka Kovinić / (Sweden) Rebecca Peterson → replaced by (Germany) Anna-Lena Friedsam / (United States) Ann Li
- (Kazakhstan) Elena Rybakina / (Denmark) Clara Tauson → replaced by (Greece) Valentini Grammatikopoulou / (Thailand) Peangtarn Plipuech
- (Netherlands) Rosalie van der Hoek / (Belgium) Alison Van Uytvanck → replaced by (Italy) Elisabetta Cocciaretto / (Bulgaria) Viktoriya Tomova
