= 2019 Rogers Cup – Women's doubles =

Women's doubles
- 2019 Rogers Cup

Final
- Champions: (Czech Republic) Barbora Krejčíková (Czech Republic) Kateřina Siniaková
- Runners-up: (Germany) Anna-Lena Grönefeld (Netherlands) Demi Schuurs
- Score: 7–5, 6–0

Details
- Draw: 28
- Seeds: 8

Events
Singles	men	women
Doubles	men	women
- Rogers Cup

Barbora Krejčíková and Kateřina Siniaková defeated the defending champion Demi Schuurs and her partner Anna-Lena Grönefeld in the final, 7–5, 6–0 to win the women's doubles tennis title at the 2019 Canadian Open.

Ashleigh Barty and Schuurs were the defending champions, but chose not to participate together. Barty partnered Victoria Azarenka, but lost in the semifinals to Krejčíková and Siniaková.

== Seeds ==
The top four seeds received byes into the second round.

1. (Czech Republic) Barbora Krejčíková / (Czech Republic) Kateřina Siniaková (champions)
2. (Canada) Gabriela Dabrowski / (China) Xu Yifan (semifinals)
3. (Germany) Anna-Lena Grönefeld / (Netherlands) Demi Schuurs (final)
4. (Belgium) Kirsten Flipkens / (Chinese Taipei) Hsieh Su-wei (quarterfinals)
5. (Chinese Taipei) Chan Hao-ching / (Chinese Taipei) Latisha Chan (second round)
6. (Belarus) Victoria Azarenka / (Australia) Ashleigh Barty (semifinals)
7. (United States) Nicole Melichar / (Czech Republic) Květa Peschke (quarterfinals)
8. (Czech Republic) Lucie Hradecká / (Slovenia) Andreja Klepač (first round)

== Draw ==
Key

- Q = Qualifier
- WC = Wild card
- LL = Lucky loser
- Alt = Alternate
- ITF = ITF entry
- PR = Protected ranking
- SR = Special ranking
- SE = Special exempt
- JE = Junior exempt
- JR = Junior Accelerator Programme entrant
- CO = College Accelerator Programme entrant
- NG = Next Gen Accelerator Program entrant
- w/o = Walkover
- r = Retired
- d = Defaulted

=== Finals ===
Semifinals
1	(Czech Republic) Barbora Krejčíková (Czech Republic) Kateřina Siniaková	3	6	[10]
6	(Belarus) Victoria Azarenka (Australia) Ashleigh Barty	6	3	[4]
3	(Germany) Anna-Lena Grönefeld (Netherlands) Demi Schuurs	6	6
2	(Canada) Gabriela Dabrowski (China) Xu Yifan	0	3

Final
1	(Czech Republic) Barbora Krejčíková (Czech Republic) Kateřina Siniaková	7	6
3	(Germany) Anna-Lena Grönefeld (Netherlands) Demi Schuurs	5	0

=== Top half ===
First round
(Romania) R Olaru (China) Z Yang	6	3	[12]
(United States) S Kenin (Latvia) A Sevastova	1	6	[10]
WC	(Canada) E Bouchard (Canada) S Fichman	6^{8}	3
(Ukraine) N Kichenok (United States) A Spears	7^{10}	6
(China) S Peng (China) S Zhang	6	1	[7]
5	(Chinese Taipei) H-c Chan (Chinese Taipei) L Chan	3	6	[10]
(Japan) E Hozumi (Japan) M Ninomiya	6	5	[10]
(Russia) A Potapova (Kazakhstan) G Voskoboeva	2	7	[4]
(Germany) J Görges (Czech Republic) Ka Plíšková	7	6
(Ukraine) L Kichenok (Latvia) J Ostapenko	5	0
(Australia) M Adamczak (Australia) S Sanders	1	2
6	(Belarus) V Azarenka (Australia) A Barty	6	6

Second round
1	(Czech Republic) B Krejčíková (Czech Republic) K Siniaková	w/o
(Romania) R Olaru (China) Z Yang
(Ukraine) N Kichenok (United States) A Spears	6	6
5	(Chinese Taipei) H-c Chan (Chinese Taipei) L Chan	1	4
4	(Belgium) K Flipkens (Chinese Taipei) S-w Hsieh	6	7^{7}
(Japan) E Hozumi (Japan) M Ninomiya	3	6^{0}
(Germany) J Görges (Czech Republic) Ka Plíšková	1	3
6	(Belarus) V Azarenka (Australia) A Barty	6	6

Quarterfinals
1	(Czech Republic) B Krejčíková (Czech Republic) K Siniaková	6	6
(Ukraine) N Kichenok (United States) A Spears	1	1
4	(Belgium) K Flipkens (Chinese Taipei) S-w Hsieh	6	2	[5]
6	(Belarus) V Azarenka (Australia) A Barty	4	6	[10]

Semifinals
1	(Czech Republic) B Krejčíková (Czech Republic) K Siniaková	3	6	[10]
6	(Belarus) V Azarenka (Australia) A Barty	6	3	[4]

=== Bottom half ===
First round
7	(United States) N Melichar (Czech Republic) K Peschke	1	6	[10]
WC	(Canada) LA Fernandez (Romania) S Halep	6	3	[5]
(United States) J Brady (Slovenia) K Srebotnik	6	6
(United States) D Krawczyk (Poland) A Rosolska	2	3
(Chile) A Guarachi (United States) A Muhammad	6	2	[4]
(Japan) S Aoyama (United States) K Christian	3	6	[10]
8	(Czech Republic) L Hradecká (Slovenia) A Klepač	6^{5}	3
(Hungary) T Babos (Estonia) A Kontaveit	7^{7}	6
(Croatia) D Jurak (Spain) MJ Martínez Sánchez	3	6	[12]
(China) Y Duan (China) S Zheng	6	3	[10]
(Japan) M Kato (United States) S Santamaria	1	6	[12]
WC	(Canada) F Abanda (Canada) C Branstine	6	3	[10]

Second round
7	(United States) N Melichar (Czech Republic) K Peschke	6	6
(United States) J Brady (Slovenia) K Srebotnik	4	0
(Japan) S Aoyama (United States) K Christian	4	2
3	(Germany) A-L Grönefeld (Netherlands) D Schuurs	6	6
(Hungary) T Babos (Estonia) A Kontaveit	6	7^{7}
(Croatia) D Jurak (Spain) MJ Martínez Sánchez	2	6^{3}
(Japan) M Kato (United States) S Santamaria	5	2
2	(Canada) G Dabrowski (China) Y Xu	7	6

Quarterfinals
7	(United States) N Melichar (Czech Republic) K Peschke	2	4
3	(Germany) A-L Grönefeld (Netherlands) D Schuurs	6	6
(Hungary) T Babos (Estonia) A Kontaveit	7^{7}	6^{5}	[3]
2	(Canada) G Dabrowski (China) Y Xu	6^{0}	7^{7}	[10]

Semifinals
3	(Germany) A-L Grönefeld (Netherlands) D Schuurs	6	6
2	(Canada) G Dabrowski (China) Y Xu	0	3
