= 2022 Mutua Madrid Open – Women's doubles =

Women's doubles
- 2022 Mutua Madrid Open

Final
- Champions: (Canada) Gabriela Dabrowski (Mexico) Giuliana Olmos
- Runners-up: (United States) Desirae Krawczyk (Netherlands) Demi Schuurs
- Score: 7–6^{(7–1)}, 5–7, [10–7]

Events
Singles	men	women
Doubles	men	women
← 2021 ·	Mutua Madrid Open	· 2023 →

Gabriela Dabrowski and Giuliana Olmos defeated Desirae Krawczyk and Demi Schuurs in the final, 7–6^{(7–1)}, 5–7, [10–7] to win the women's doubles tennis title at the 2022 Madrid Open. This was Dabrowski's third consecutive final at the tournament, having lost the previous two editions in 2021 and 2019.

Barbora Krejčíková and Kateřina Siniaková were the defending champions, but Krejčíková could not defend her title due to injury. Siniaková played alongside Leylah Fernandez, but lost in the second round to Ulrikke Eikeri and Tereza Mihalíková.

== Seeds ==
The two top seeds received a bye into the second round.

1. (Australia) Storm Sanders / (China) Zhang Shuai (semifinals)
2. (Canada) Gabriela Dabrowski / (Mexico) Giuliana Olmos (champions)
3. (United States) Desirae Krawczyk / (Netherlands) Demi Schuurs (final)
4. (Chile) Alexa Guarachi / (Slovenia) Andreja Klepač (first round)
5. (United States) Coco Gauff / (United States) Jessica Pegula (quarterfinals)
6. (Kazakhstan) Anna Danilina / (Brazil) Beatriz Haddad Maia (first round)
7. (China) Xu Yifan / (China) Yang Zhaoxuan (first round)
8. (Japan) Shuko Aoyama / (Chinese Taipei) Chan Hao-ching (second round)

== Draw ==
=== Key ===
- Q = Qualifier
- WC = Wild card
- LL = Lucky loser
- Alt = Alternate
- ITF = ITF entry
- PR = Protected ranking
- SR = Special ranking
- SE = Special exempt
- JE = Junior exempt
- JR = Junior Accelerator Programme entrant
- CO = College Accelerator Programme entrant
- NG = Next Gen Accelerator Program entrant
- w/o = Walkover
- r = Retired
- d = Defaulted

=== Finals ===
Semifinals
1	(Australia) Storm Sanders (China) Zhang Shuai	5	6^{5}
3	(United States) Desirae Krawczyk (Netherlands) Demi Schuurs	7	7^{7}
(Ukraine) Lyudmyla Kichenok (Latvia) Jeļena Ostapenko	7	1	[6]
2	(Canada) Gabriela Dabrowski (Mexico) Giuliana Olmos	5	6	[10]

Final
3	(United States) Desirae Krawczyk (Netherlands) Demi Schuurs	6^{1}	7	[7]
2	(Canada) Gabriela Dabrowski (Mexico) Giuliana Olmos	7^{7}	5	[10]

=== Top half ===
First round
(Poland) A Rosolska (New Zealand) E Routliffe	6	6
(Japan) E Hozumi (Japan) M Ninomiya	2	4
N Dzalamidze; L Marozava	4	3
(France) A Cornet (Australia) A Tomljanović	6	6
(United States) K Christian (Georgia (country)) O Kalashnikova	2	3
8	(Japan) S Aoyama (Chinese Taipei) H-c Chan	6	6
3	(United States) D Krawczyk (Netherlands) D Schuurs	6	6
WC	(Spain) C Bucșa (Spain) N Párrizas Díaz	1	0
(Czech Republic) M Bouzková (Slovenia) T Zidanšek	3	6	[10]
(Kazakhstan) E Rybakina; L Samsonova	6	4	[6]
(United States) D Collins (Kazakhstan) Y Putintseva	4	3
(Czech Republic) K Muchová (Czech Republic) Ka Plíšková	6	6
(Spain) P Badosa; A Sabalenka	1	4
5	(United States) C Gauff (United States) J Pegula	6	6

Second round
1	(Australia) S Sanders (China) S Zhang	6	6
(Poland) A Rosolska (New Zealand) E Routliffe	2	4
(France) A Cornet (Australia) A Tomljanović	6	2	[11]
8	(Japan) S Aoyama (Chinese Taipei) H-c Chan	3	6	[9]
3	(United States) D Krawczyk (Netherlands) D Schuurs	7^{7}	6
(Czech Republic) M Bouzková (Slovenia) T Zidanšek	6^{4}	3
(Czech Republic) K Muchová (Czech Republic) Ka Plíšková
5	(United States) C Gauff (United States) J Pegula	w/o

Quarterfinals
1	(Australia) S Sanders (China) S Zhang	6	6
(France) A Cornet (Australia) A Tomljanović	4	3
3	(United States) D Krawczyk (Netherlands) D Schuurs	7^{7}	3	[10]
5	(United States) C Gauff (United States) J Pegula	6^{5}	6	[5]

Semifinals
1	(Australia) S Sanders (China) S Zhang	5	6^{5}
3	(United States) D Krawczyk (Netherlands) D Schuurs	7	7^{7}

=== Bottom half ===
First round
7	(China) Y Xu (China) Z Yang	2	0
(Belgium) K Flipkens (Spain) S Sorribes Tormo	6	6
(Switzerland) B Bencic (Switzerland) V Golubic	6	6
PR	(Germany) J Lohoff (Czech Republic) R Voráčová	3	1
(Poland) K Piter (Belgium) K Zimmermann	2	6^{7}
(United States) N Melichar-Martinez (Australia) E Perez	6	7^{9}
(Ukraine) L Kichenok (Latvia) J Ostapenko	7	1	[10]
4	(Chile) A Guarachi (Slovenia) A Klepač	5	6	[3]
6	(Kazakhstan) A Danilina (Brazil) B Haddad Maia	7^{7}	6^{4}	[7]
(Canada) L Fernandez (Czech Republic) K Siniaková	6^{4}	7^{7}	[10]
(Germany) V Heisen (United States) S Santamaria	6^{4}	1
(Norway) U Eikeri (Slovakia) T Mihalíková	7^{7}	6
PR	(China) X Han; A Panova	6	4	[11]
(Georgia (country)) E Gorgodze (Ukraine) N Kichenok	4	6	[9]

Second round
(Belgium) K Flipkens (Spain) S Sorribes Tormo	3	6	[8]
(Switzerland) B Bencic (Switzerland) V Golubic	6	3	[10]
(United States) N Melichar-Martinez (Australia) E Perez	4	5
(Ukraine) L Kichenok (Latvia) J Ostapenko	6	7
(Canada) L Fernandez (Czech Republic) K Siniaková	1	4
(Norway) U Eikeri (Slovakia) T Mihalíková	6	6
PR	(China) X Han; A Panova	7^{7}	4	[8]
2	(Canada) G Dabrowski (Mexico) G Olmos	6^{3}	6	[10]

Quarterfinals
(Switzerland) B Bencic (Switzerland) V Golubic	3	4
(Ukraine) L Kichenok (Latvia) J Ostapenko	6	6
(Norway) U Eikeri (Slovakia) T Mihalíková	3	2
2	(Canada) G Dabrowski (Mexico) G Olmos	6	6

Semifinals
(Ukraine) L Kichenok (Latvia) J Ostapenko	7	1	[6]
2	(Canada) G Dabrowski (Mexico) G Olmos	5	6	[10]

== Seeded teams ==
The following are the seeded teams, based on WTA rankings as of April 25, 2022.

Country	Player	Country	Player	Rank	Seed
AUS	Storm Sanders	CHN	Zhang Shuai	22	1
CAN	Gabriela Dabrowski	MEX	Giuliana Olmos	29	2
USA	Desirae Krawczyk	NED	Demi Schuurs	33	3
CHI	Alexa Guarachi	SLO	Andreja Klepač	35	4
USA	Coco Gauff	USA	Jessica Pegula	41	5
KAZ	Anna Danilina	BRA	Beatriz Haddad Maia	58	7
CHN	Xu Yifan	CHN	Yang Zhaoxuan	59	7
JPN	Shuko Aoyama	TPE	Chan Hao-ching	61	8

== Other entry information ==
=== Wildcards ===
- (Spain) Cristina Bucșa / (Spain) Nuria Párrizas Díaz

=== Protected ranking ===
- (Germany) Julia Lohoff / (Czech Republic) Renata Voráčová
- (China) Xinyun Han / Alexandra Panova

=== Withdrawals ===
Before the tournament

- (Norway) Ulrikke Eikeri / (United States) Catherine Harrison → replaced by (Norway) Ulrikke Eikeri / (Slovakia) Tereza Mihalíková
- (Czech Republic) Lucie Hradecká / (India) Sania Mirza → replaced by (United States) Kaitlyn Christian / (Georgia (country)) Oksana Kalashnikova
- (Ukraine) Nadiia Kichenok / (Romania) Raluca Olaru → replaced by (Ukraine) Nadiia Kichenok / (Georgia (country)) Ekaterine Gorgodze
- Veronika Kudermetova / (Belgium) Elise Mertens → replaced by (Kazakhstan) Elena Rybakina / Liudmila Samsonova
- (Czech Republic) Tereza Martincová / (Czech Republic) Markéta Vondroušová → replaced by (Germany) Julia Lohoff / (Czech Republic) Renata Voráčová
- Alexandra Panova / (Romania) Monica Niculescu → replaced by Alexandra Panova / (China) Han Xinyun
