= I-formation (tennis) =

I-formation is a doubles tennis strategy carefully planned to confuse the opponent returning the serve. "The name comes from its resemblance to American football's I formation, in which the fullback positions right behind the halfback, who positions right behind the quarterback."

"The net player on the serving team crouches down (so they do not get hit by the serve) on the centre service line. The server hits the serve from directly behind her on the baseline". The net player then indicates (privately), typically with their hands behind their back, which side of the court they will move to as the return of serve is hit. These hand gestures let the server at the baseline know which side of the court they are to serve to, and then move to. For intermediate players, such as league or club players, it is recommended that the server head to the opposite side to which the net player is headed so that maximum court coverage is obtained. Advanced competitors, such as professional and tour players, are known to use other combinations (for example, Australian doubles) which deliberately expose one side of the court to entice the return of serve to be hit into the open space.

The ultimate aim is for the net player to cut off the return of serve, hopefully ending the point.

== Why I-formation is effective ==
In doubles tennis, it is beneficial to keep the ball away from the opposition net player, because it is easy to hit a point-winning shot from closer to the net than any other position on the court.

This tactic has the player returning the serve guess which side the opponents net player will be on. Therefore, there is a 50–50 chance that the person returning the serve is going to hit the ball right into the opposing net player, which can be the worst place to return the serve in doubles.

== See also ==
- I-formation (pickleball)
