= 2023 WTA Finals =

- Date: 29 October – 6 November
- Edition: 52nd (singles) / 47th (doubles)
- Draw: 8S / 8D
- Prize money: $9 million
- Surface: Hard (outdoor)
- Location: Cancún, Mexico
- Venue: Estadio Paradisus

Champions

Singles
- (Poland) Iga Świątek

Doubles
- (Germany) Laura Siegemund / Vera Zvonareva
← 2022 ·	WTA Finals	· 2024 →

The 2023 WTA Finals (officially the GNP Seguros WTA Finals Cancun) was the professional women's year-end championship tennis tournament run by the Women's Tennis Association (WTA). It was the 52nd edition of the singles event and the 47th edition of the doubles competition and took place in Cancún, Mexico between 29 October and 6 November, marking the return to Mexico for the second time after the 2021 edition was held in Guadalajara, and the fourth consecutive finals to be held in a different staged city (Shenzhen in 2019, Guadalajara in 2021, and Fort Worth in 2022). The tournament was held on an outdoor hardcourt and was contested by the eight highest-ranked singles players and doubles teams of the 2023 WTA Tour.

== Champions ==
=== Singles ===
- (Poland) Iga Świątek def. (United States) Jessica Pegula, 6–1, 6–0.

This was Świątek's sixth WTA Tour title of the year and first WTA Finals title.

=== Doubles ===
- (Germany) Laura Siegemund / Vera Zvonareva def. (United States) Nicole Melichar-Martinez / (Australia) Ellen Perez, 6–4, 6–4

== Tournament ==
=== Location ===
There were four other cities in contention to host the WTA Finals prior to Cancún's selection as the host city. These cities were Riyadh, Ostrava, Cluj-Napoca, and Washington, D.C. A temporary venue was built on the grounds of the Paradisus Cancún hotel at an estimated cost of $6 million. The stadium seats 4,300 people, the lowest capacity ever for the WTA Finals. Multiple players and coaches complained about the stadium's conditions, saying the surface was inconsistent.

=== Qualifying ===
In the singles, point totals are calculated by combining point totals from sixteen tournaments (excluding ITF and WTA 125 tournaments). Of these sixteen tournaments, a player's results from the four Grand Slam events, the four WTA 1000 tournaments with 1,000 points for the winner, and (for the players who played the main draw of least two such tournaments) the best results from two WTA 1000 tournaments with 900 points for the winner must be included.

In the doubles, point totals are calculated by any combination of eleven tournaments throughout the year. Unlike in the singles, this combination does not need to include results from the Grand Slams or WTA 1000 tournaments.

=== Format ===
Both the singles and doubles event features eight players/teams in a round-robin event, split into two groups of four.

Over the first six days of competition, each player/team meets the other three players/teams in her group, with the top two in each group advancing to the semifinals. The first-placed player/team in one group meets the second-placed player/team in the other group, and vice versa. The winners of each semifinal meet in the championship match.

=== Round robin tie-breaking methods ===
The final standings are made using these methods:

1. Greatest number of match wins
2. Greatest number of matches played
3. Head-to-head results if only two players are tied, or if three players are tied then:

a. If three players each have the same number of wins, a player having played less than all three matches is automatically eliminated and the player advancing to the single-elimination competition is the winner of the match-up of the two remaining tied players.
b. Highest percentage of sets won
c. Highest percentage of games won

== Prize money and points ==
The total prize money for the 2023 WTA Finals is US$9 million. The tables below are based on the updated draw sheet information.

Stage	Prize money		Points
Stage	Singles	Doubles (Note: Prize money for doubles is per team.)	Points
Champion	RR (Note: RR means prize money or points won in the round-robin round.) + $2,232,000	RR + $450,000	RR + 750
Runner-up	RR + $756,000	RR + $144,000	RR + 330
Semifinalist	RR + $54,000	RR + $9,000	RR
Round robin win per match	+$198,000	+$36,000	250
Round robin loss per match	—	—	125
Participation Fee	$198,000	$90,000	—

- An undefeated champion would earn the maximum 1,500 points, and $3,024,000 in singles or $648,000 in doubles.

== Qualified players ==
=== Singles ===
#	Players	Points	Date qualified
1	Aryna Sabalenka	8,425	22 September
2	(Poland) Iga Świątek	7,795	22 September
3	(United States) Coco Gauff	5,955	22 September
4	(Kazakhstan) Elena Rybakina	5,865	22 September
5	(United States) Jessica Pegula	4,895	2 October
6	(Tunisia) Ons Jabeur	3,695	6 October
7	(Czech Republic) Markéta Vondroušová	3,671	6 October
inj.	(Czech Republic) Karolína Muchová	3,650	6 October
8	(Greece) Maria Sakkari	3,245	24 October

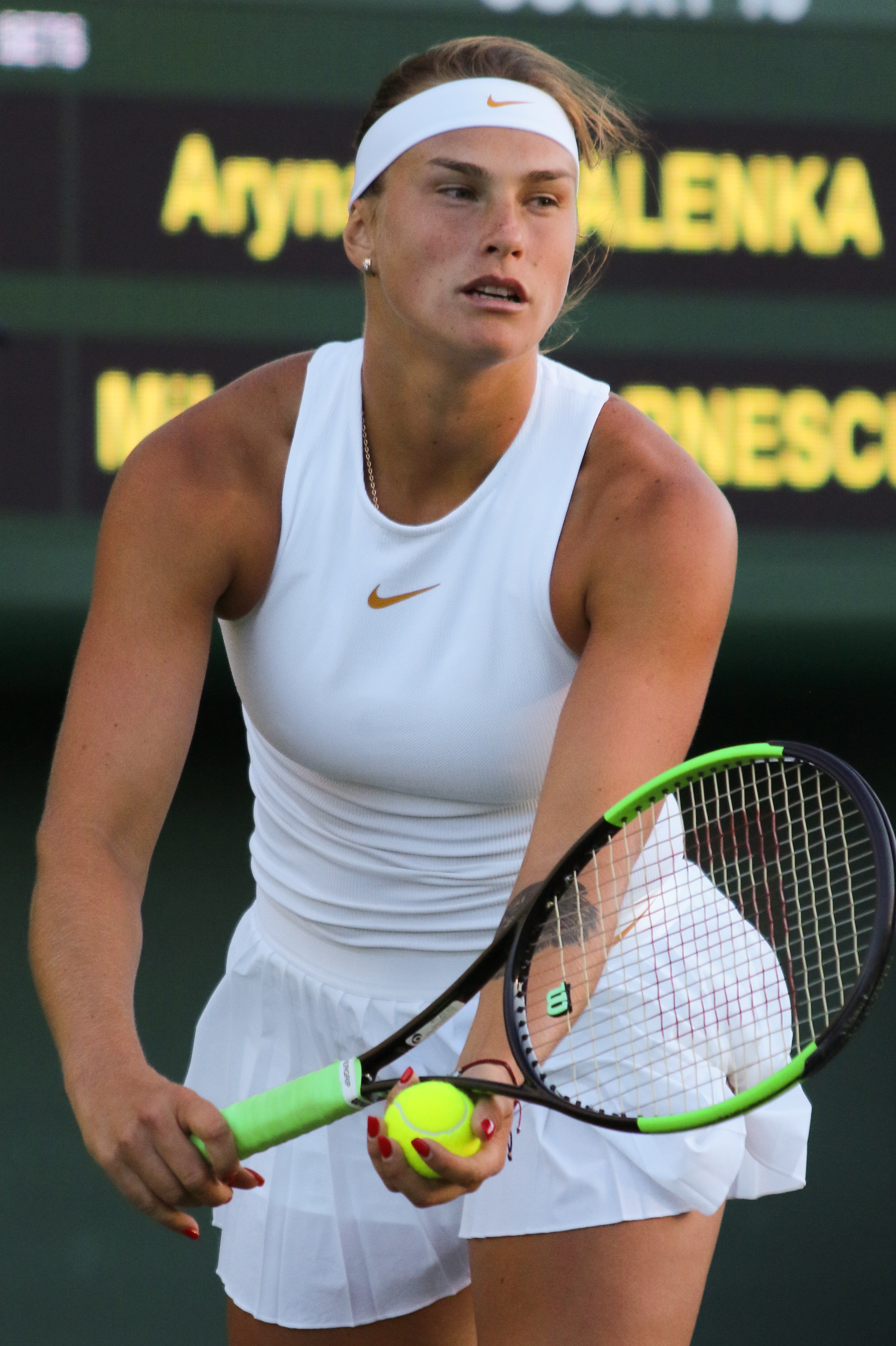
A. Sabalenka

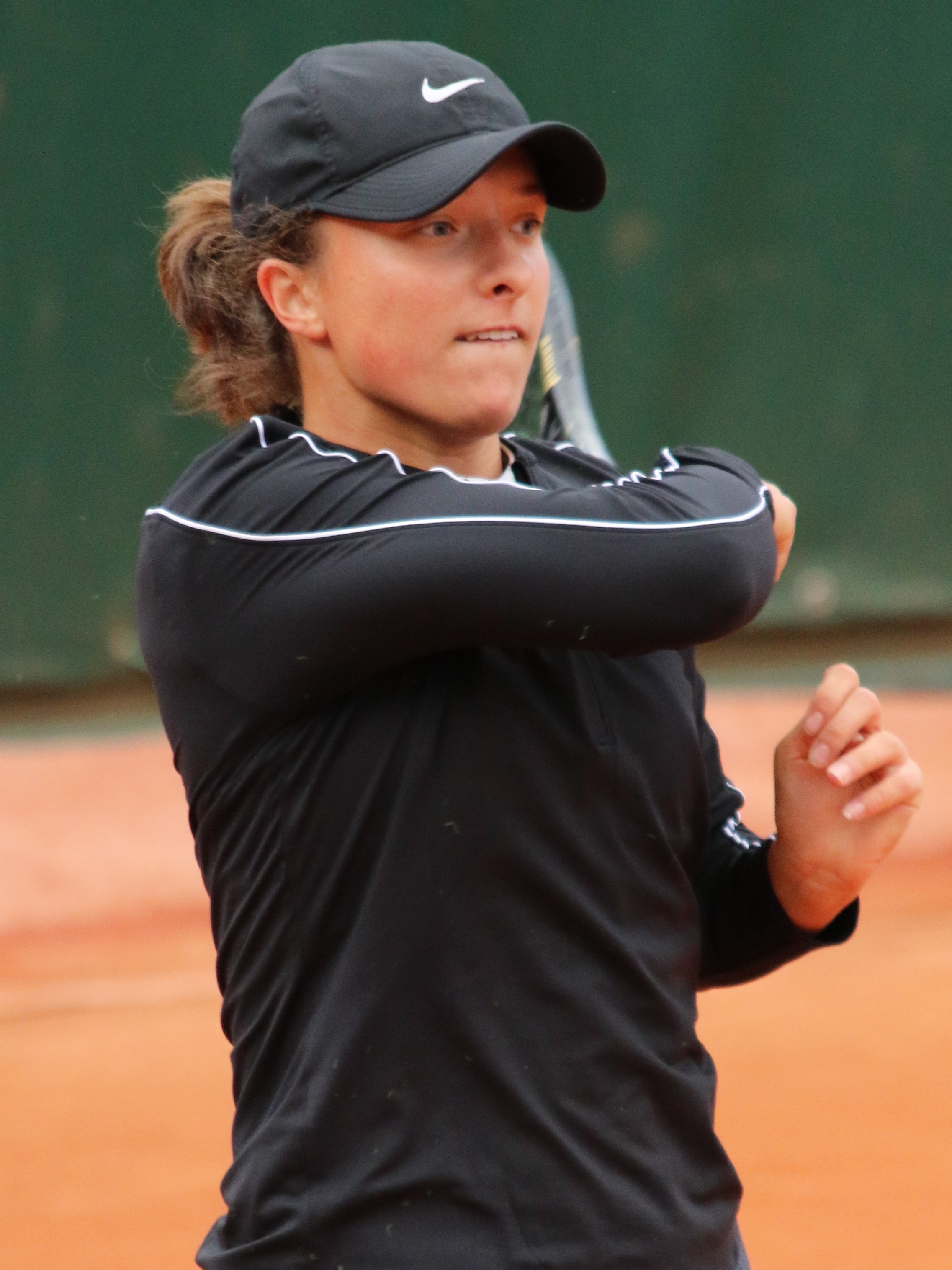
I. Świątek

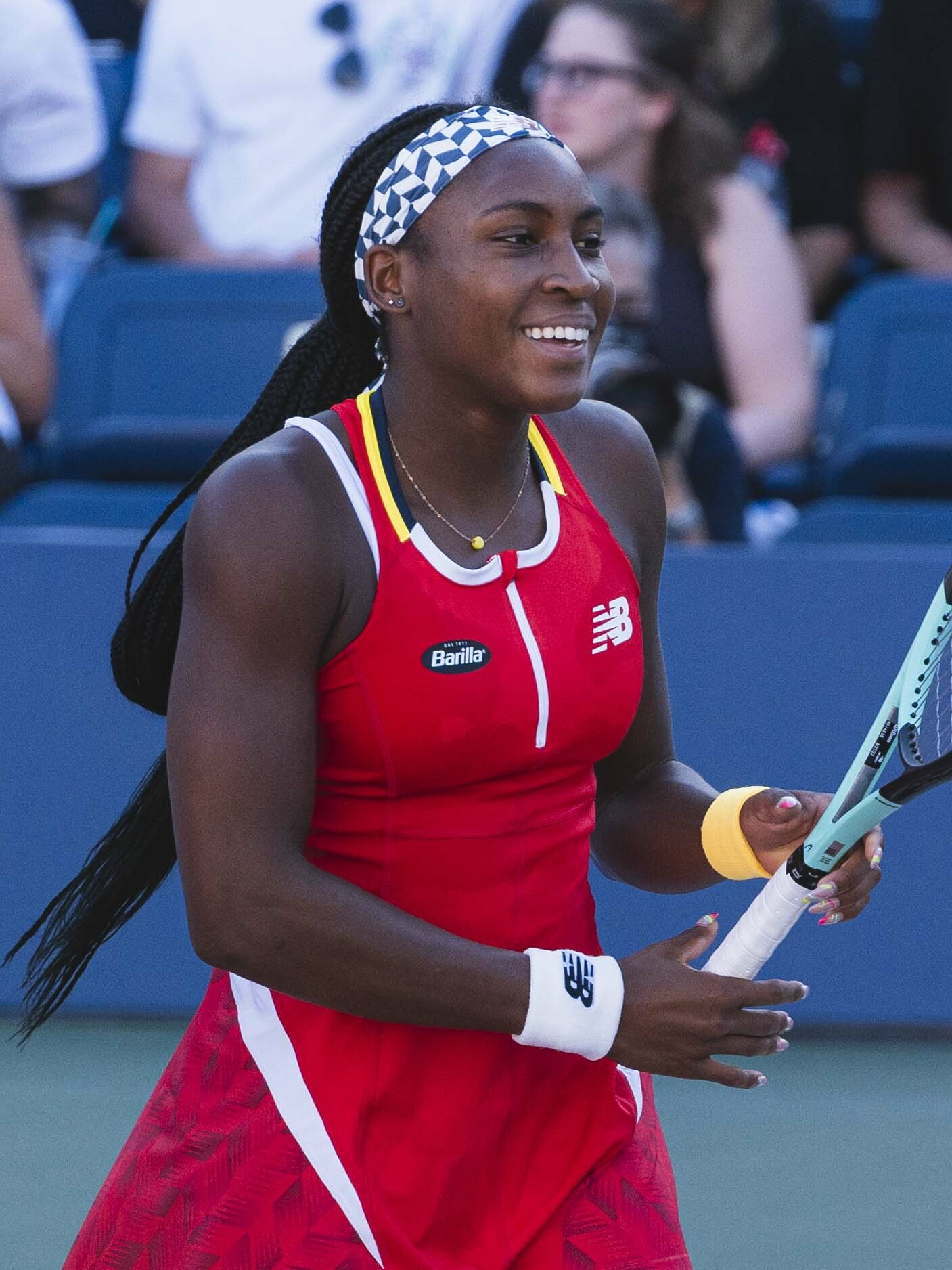
C. Gauff

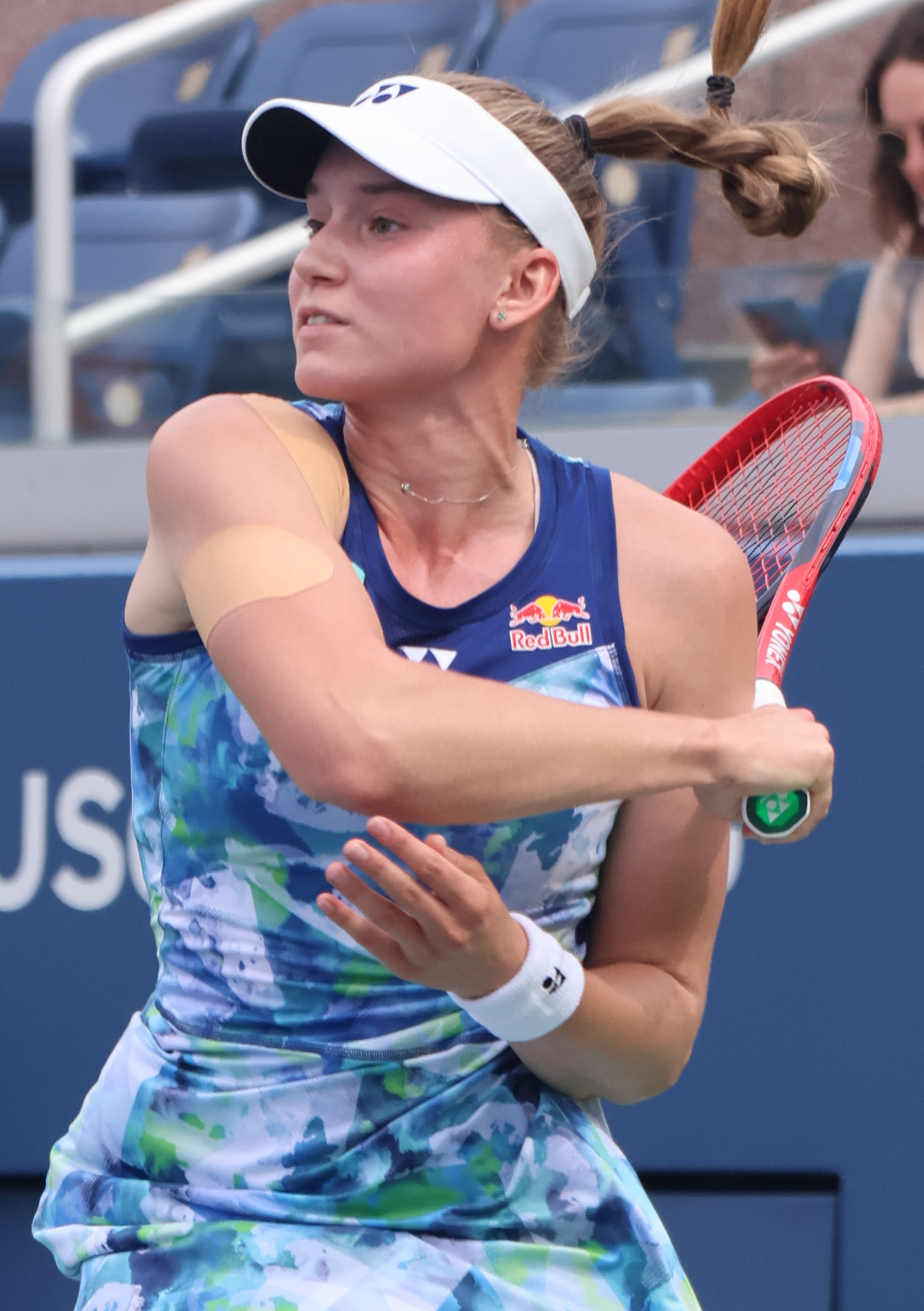
E. Rybakina

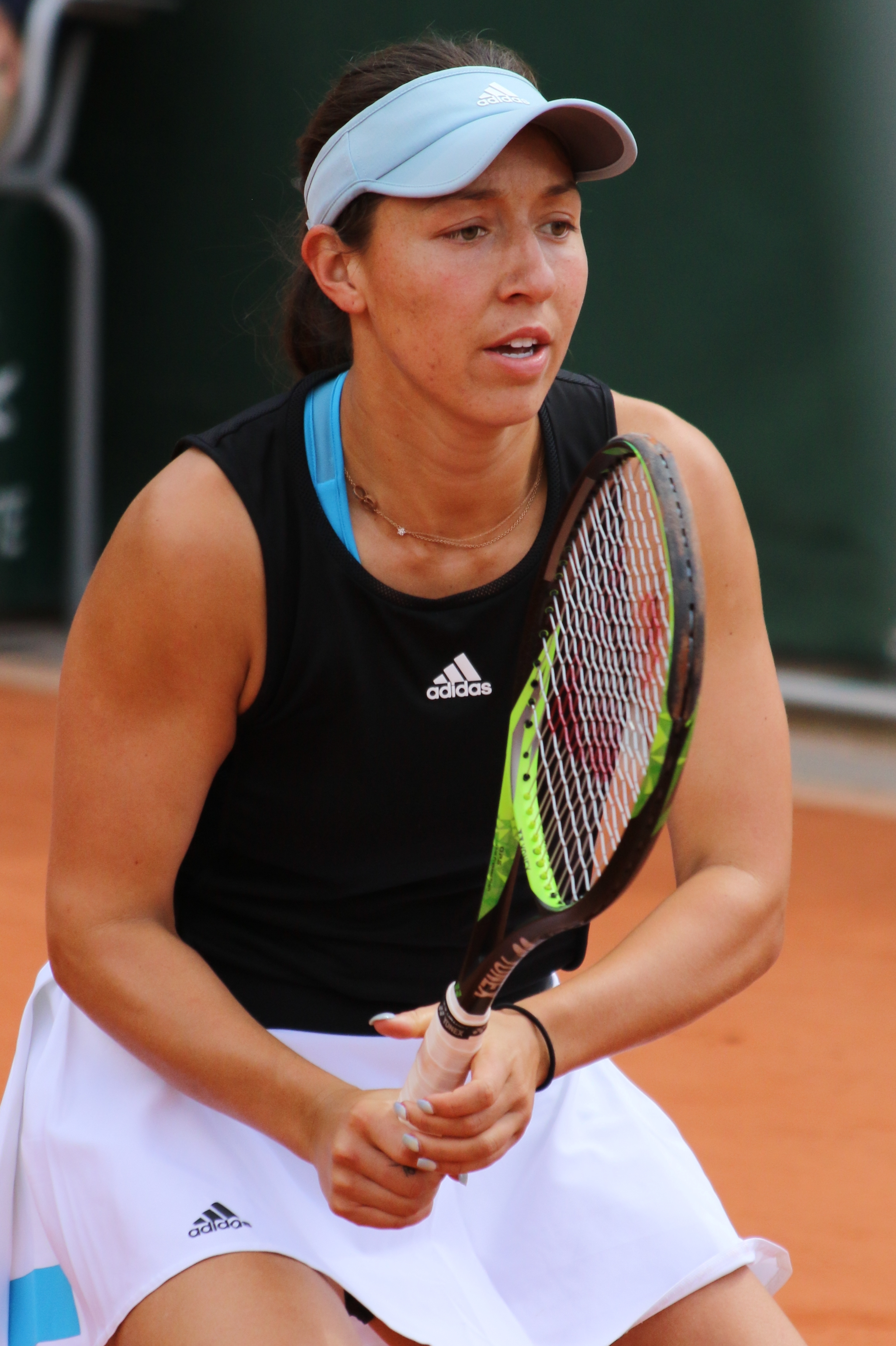
J. Pegula

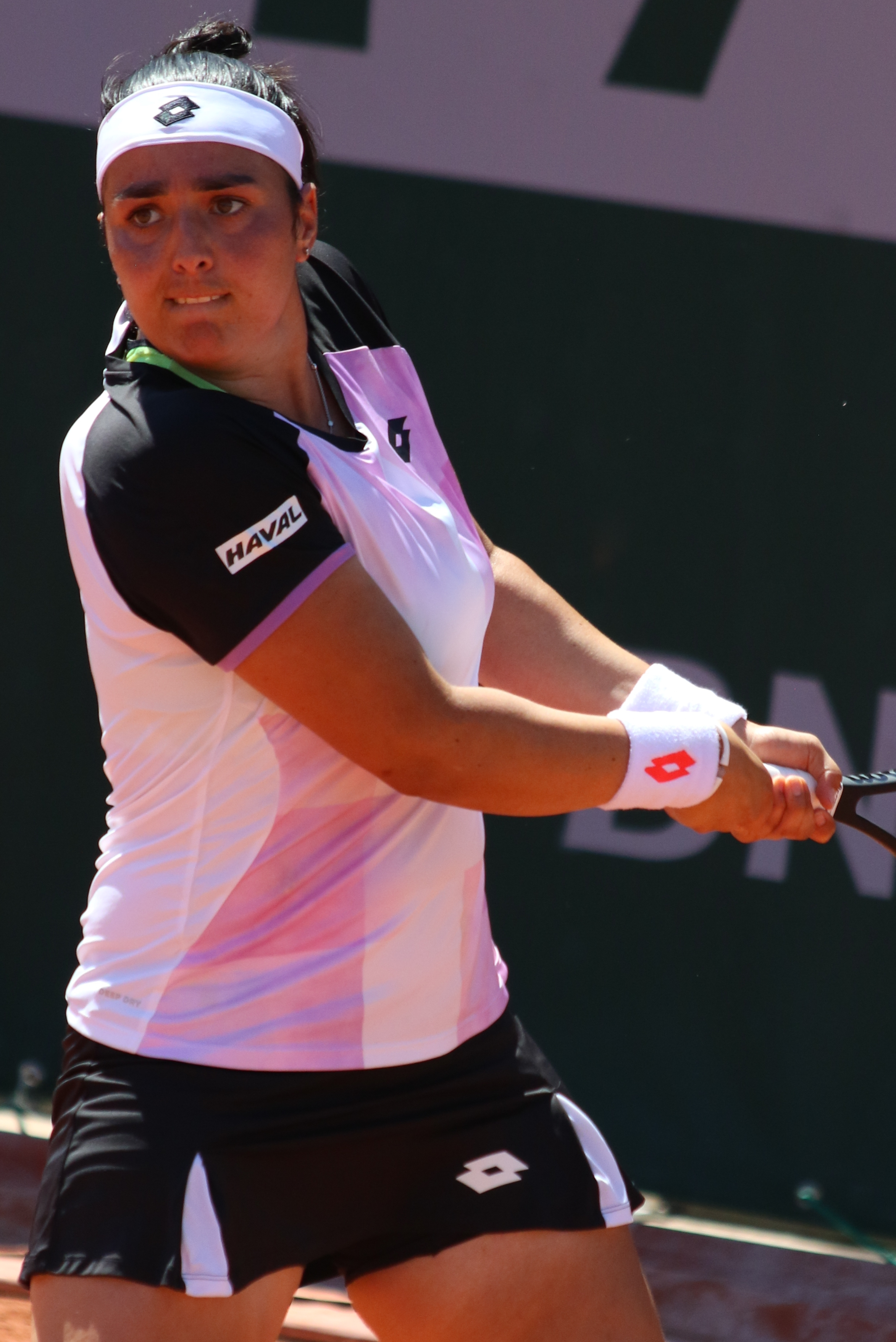
O. Jabeur

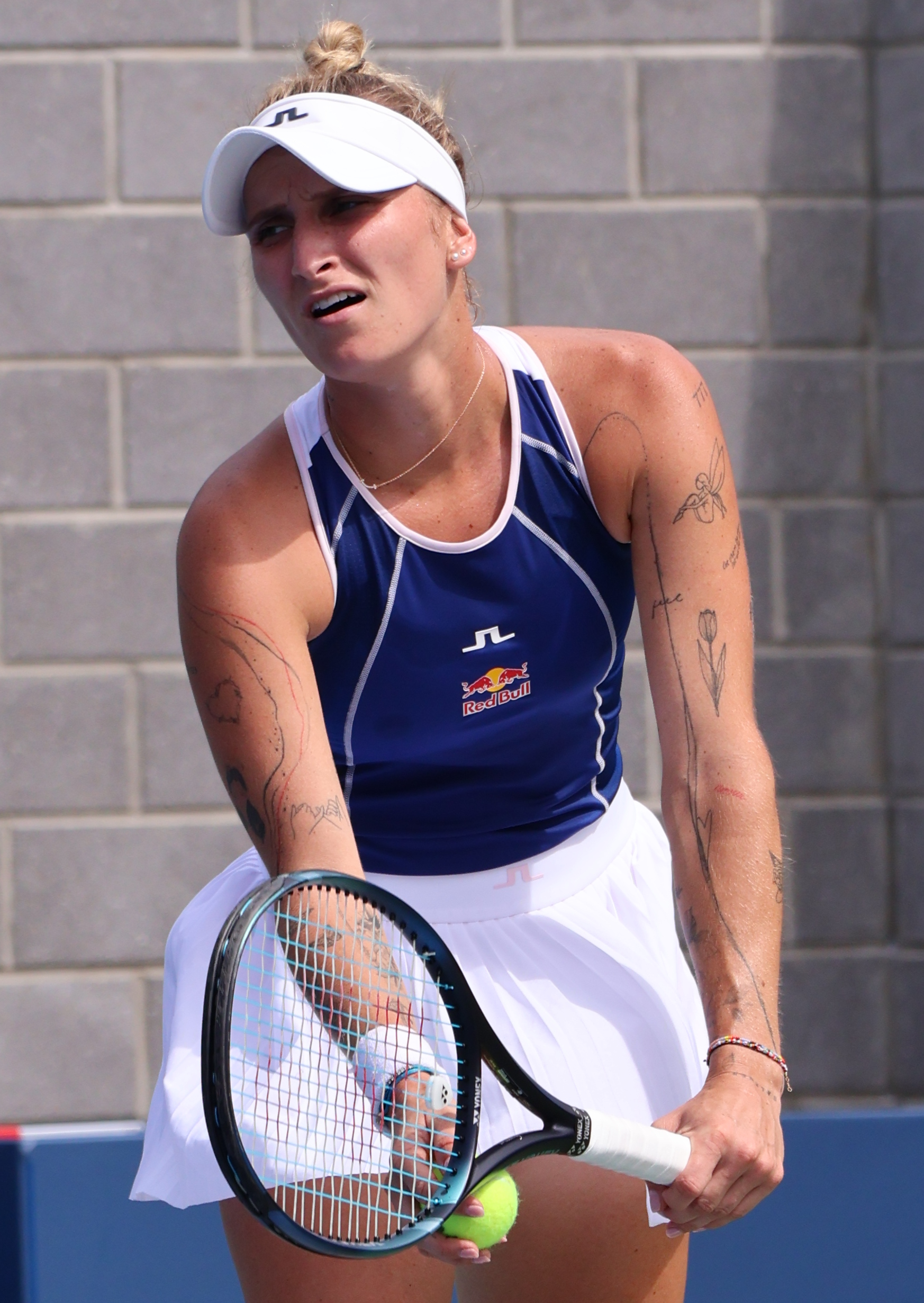
M. Vondroušová

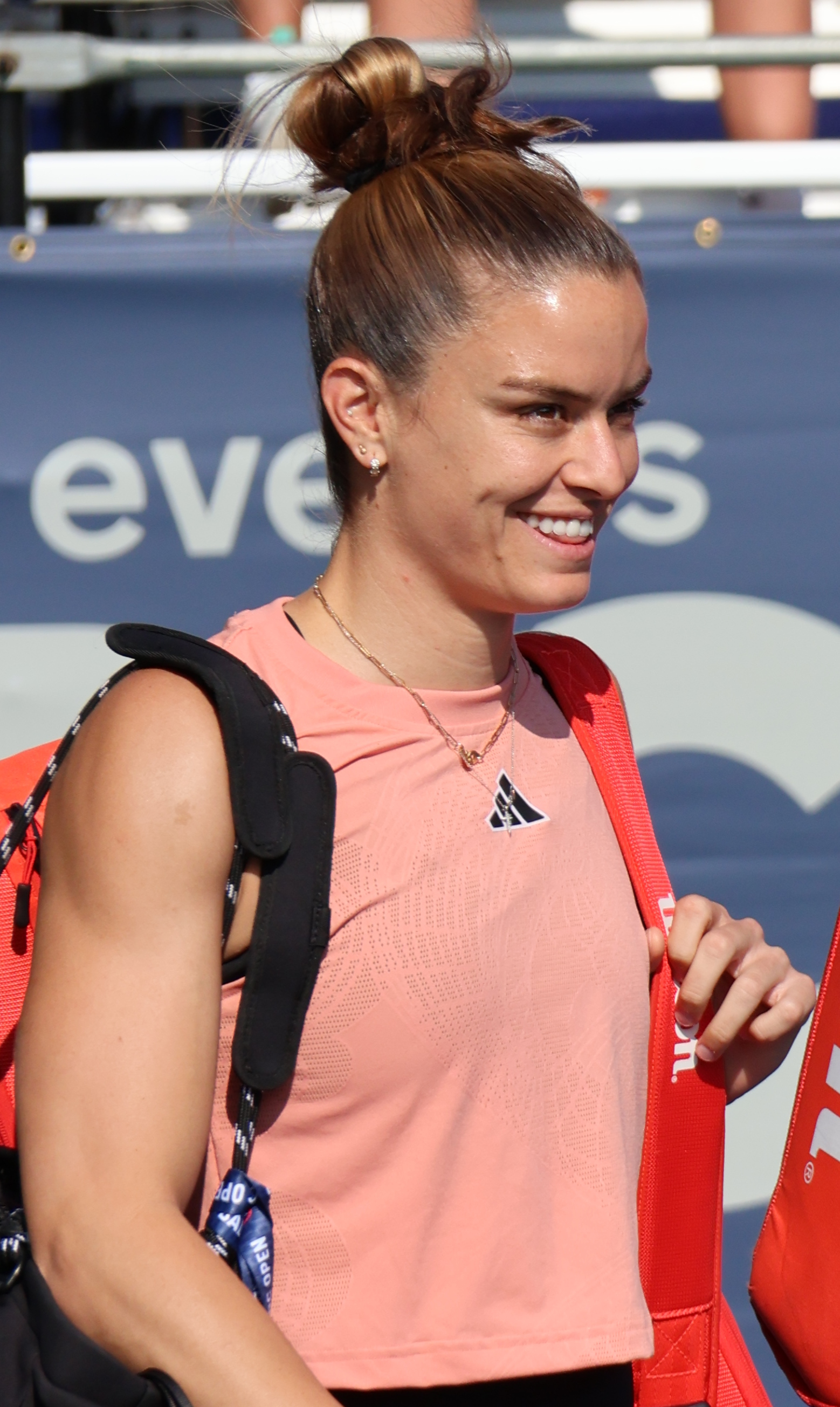
M. Sakkari

=== Doubles ===
#	Players	Points	Date qualified
1	(United States) Coco Gauff (United States) Jessica Pegula	5,565	22 September
2	(Australia) Storm Hunter (Belgium) Elise Mertens	5,130	2 October
3	(Japan) Shuko Aoyama (Japan) Ena Shibahara	3,790	9 October
4	(Czech Republic) Barbora Krejčíková (Czech Republic) Kateřina Siniaková	3,785	4 October
5	(United States) Desirae Krawczyk (Netherlands) Demi Schuurs	3,570	9 October
6	(Germany) Laura Siegemund; Vera Zvonareva	3,405	22 October
7	(Canada) Gabriela Dabrowski (New Zealand) Erin Routliffe	3,386	16 October
8	(United States) Nicole Melichar-Martinez (Australia) Ellen Perez	3,325	16 October

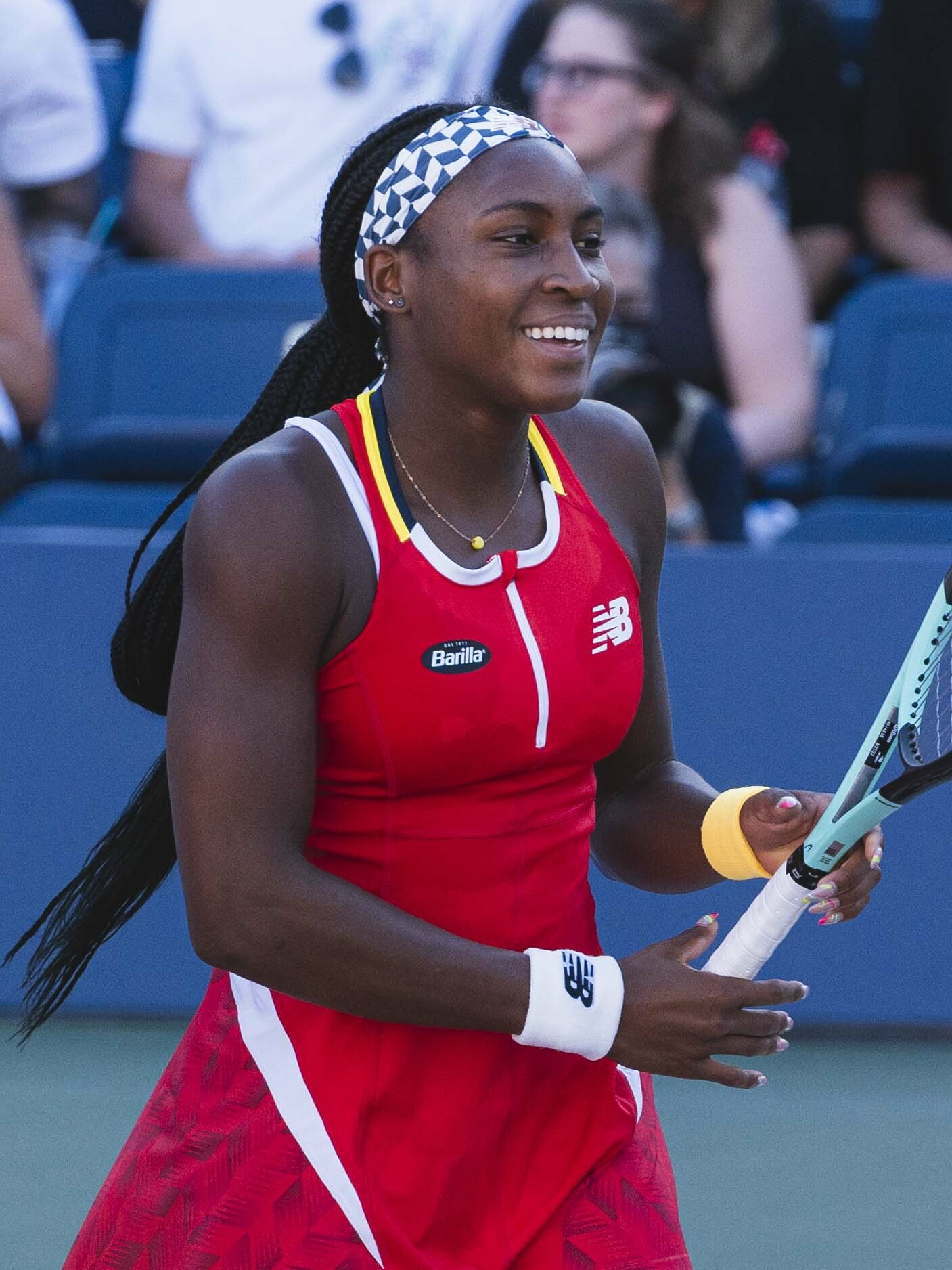
Gauff

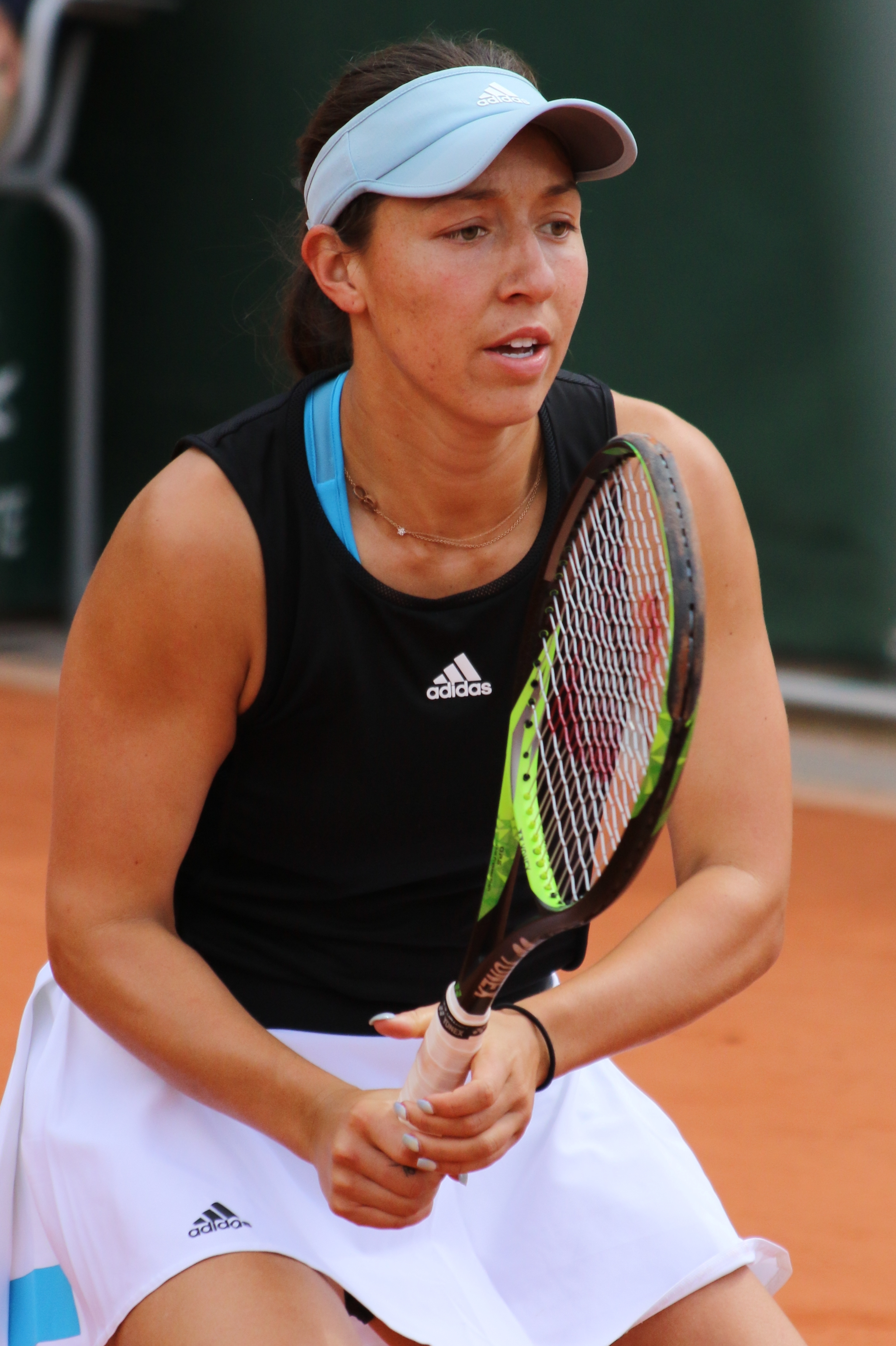
Pegula

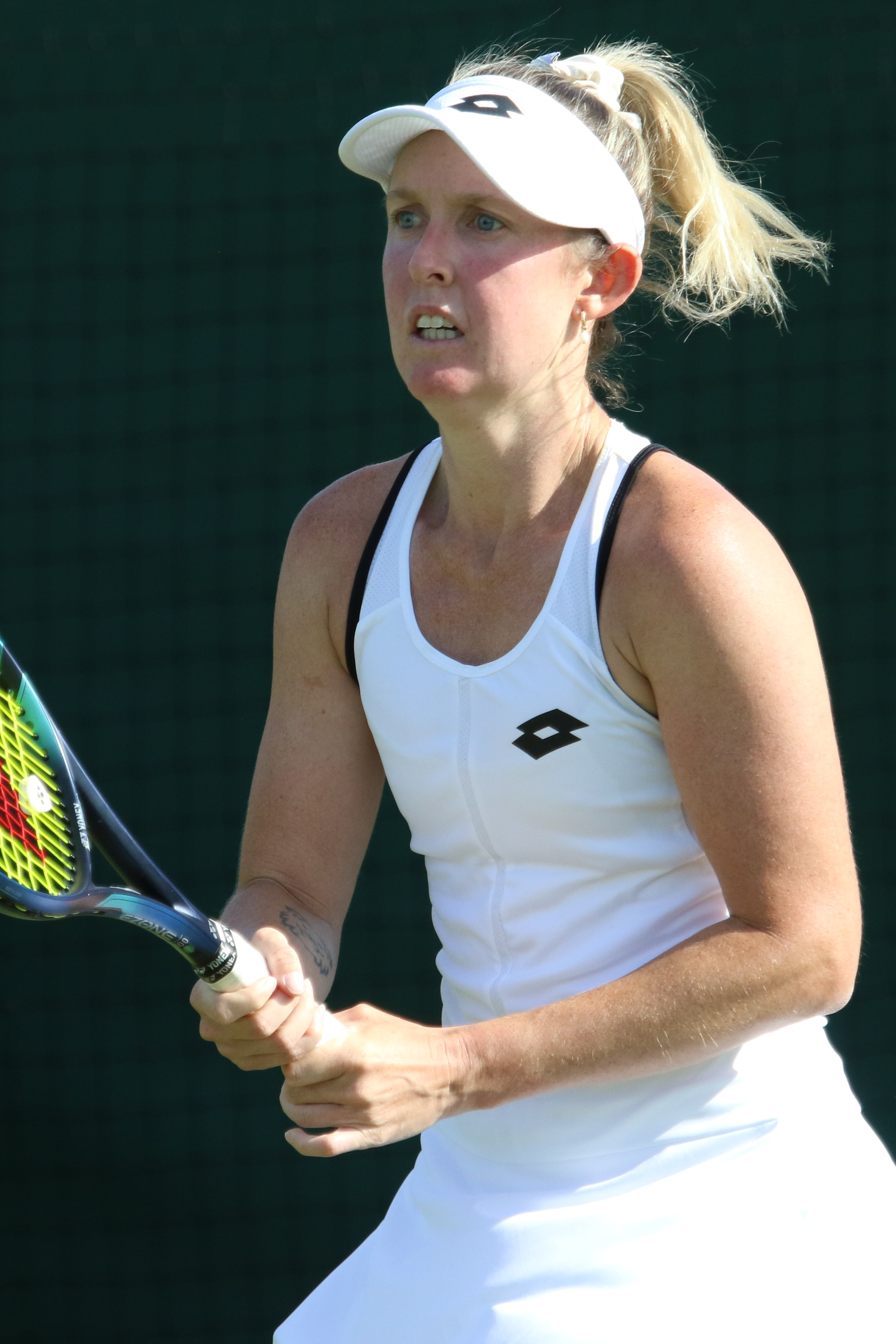
Hunter

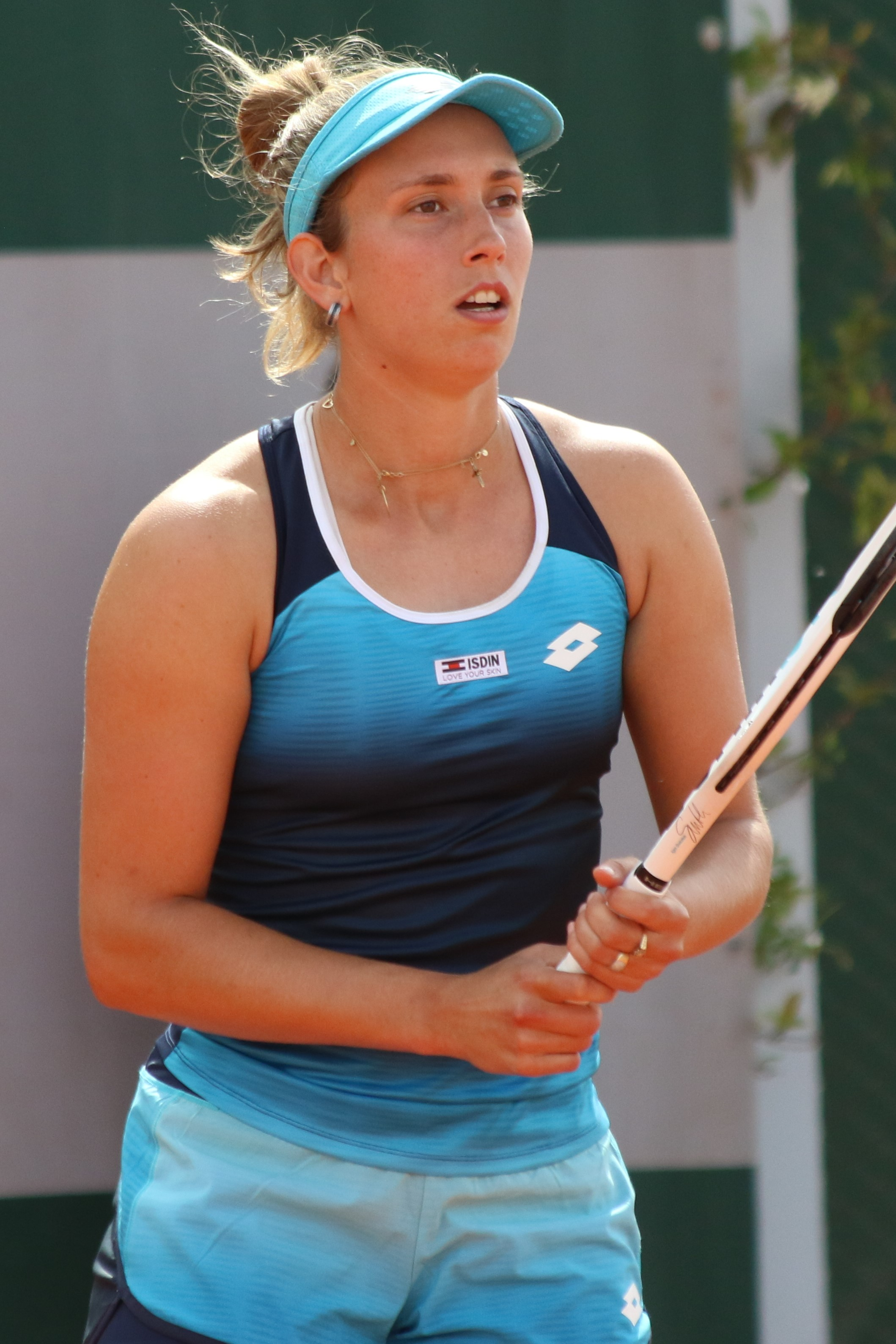
Mertens

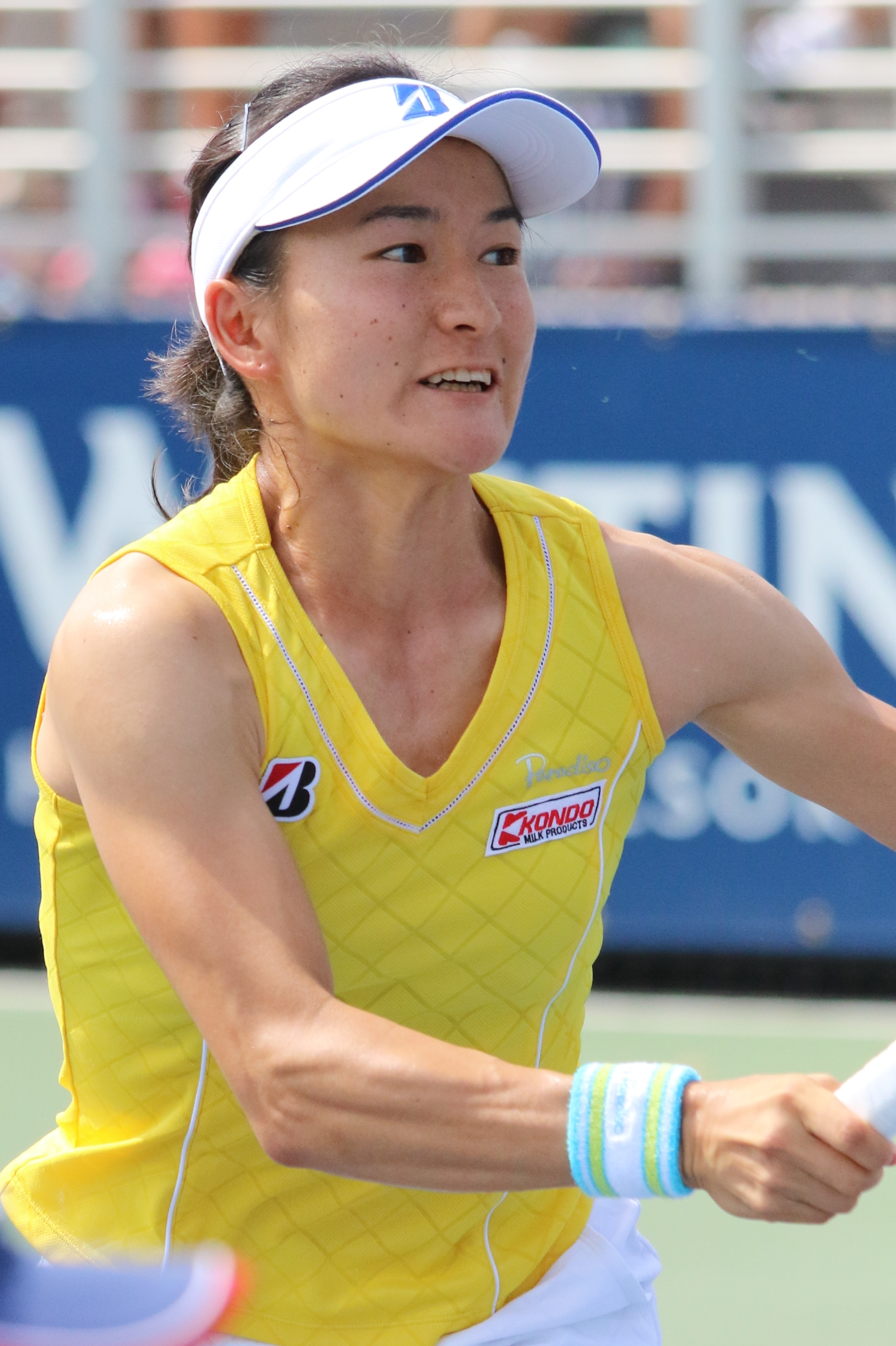
Aoyama

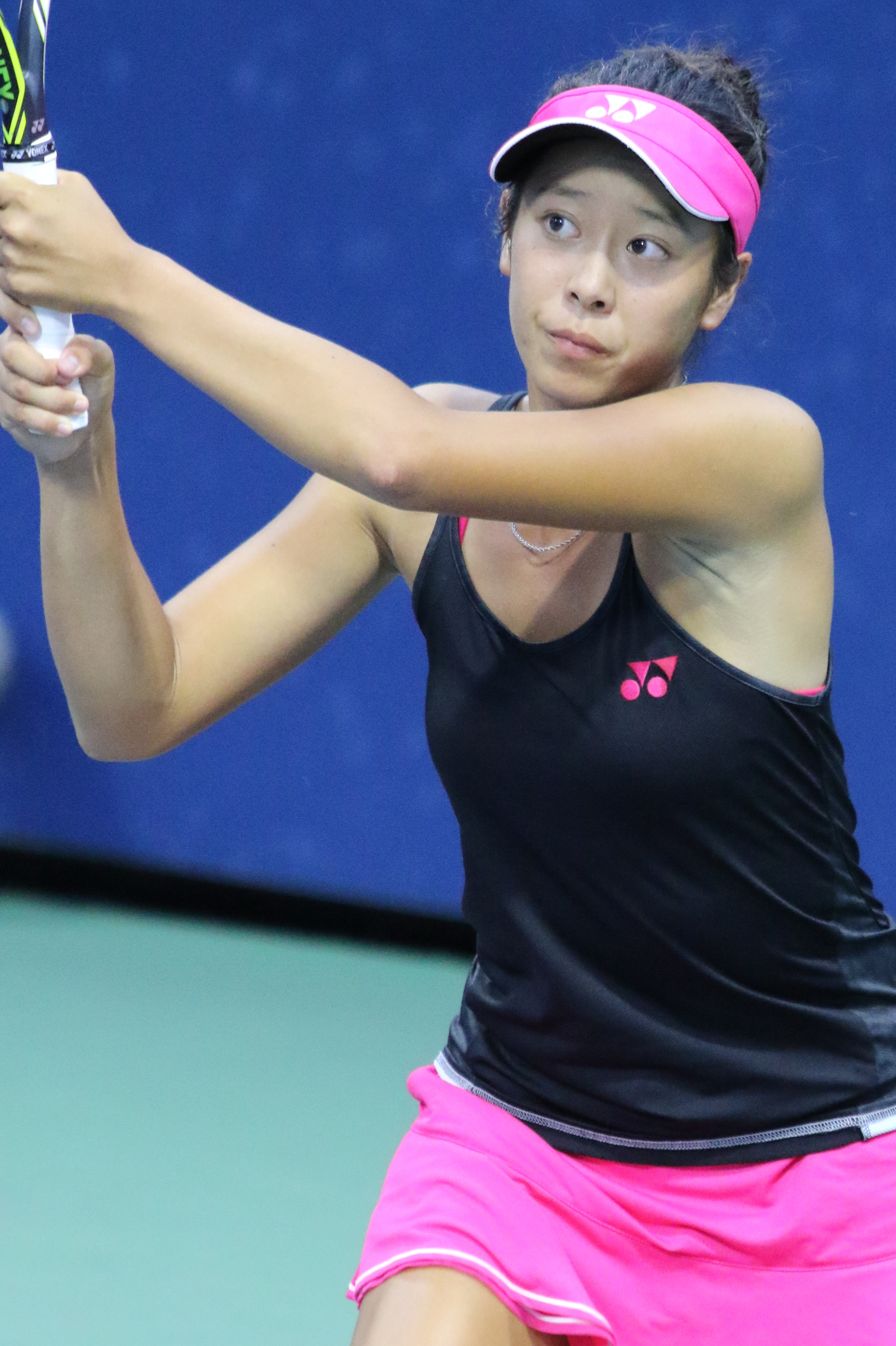
Shibahara

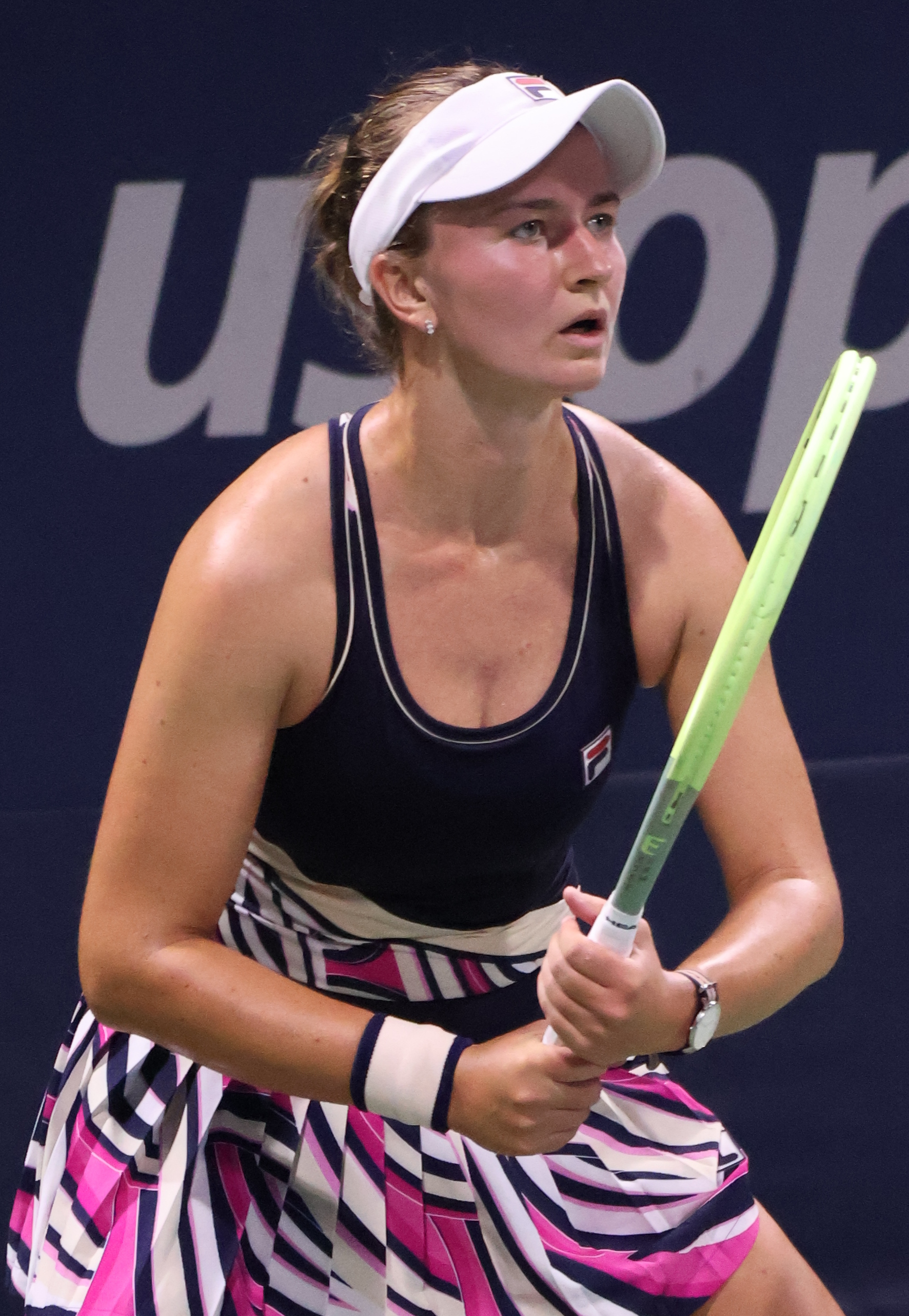
Krejčíková

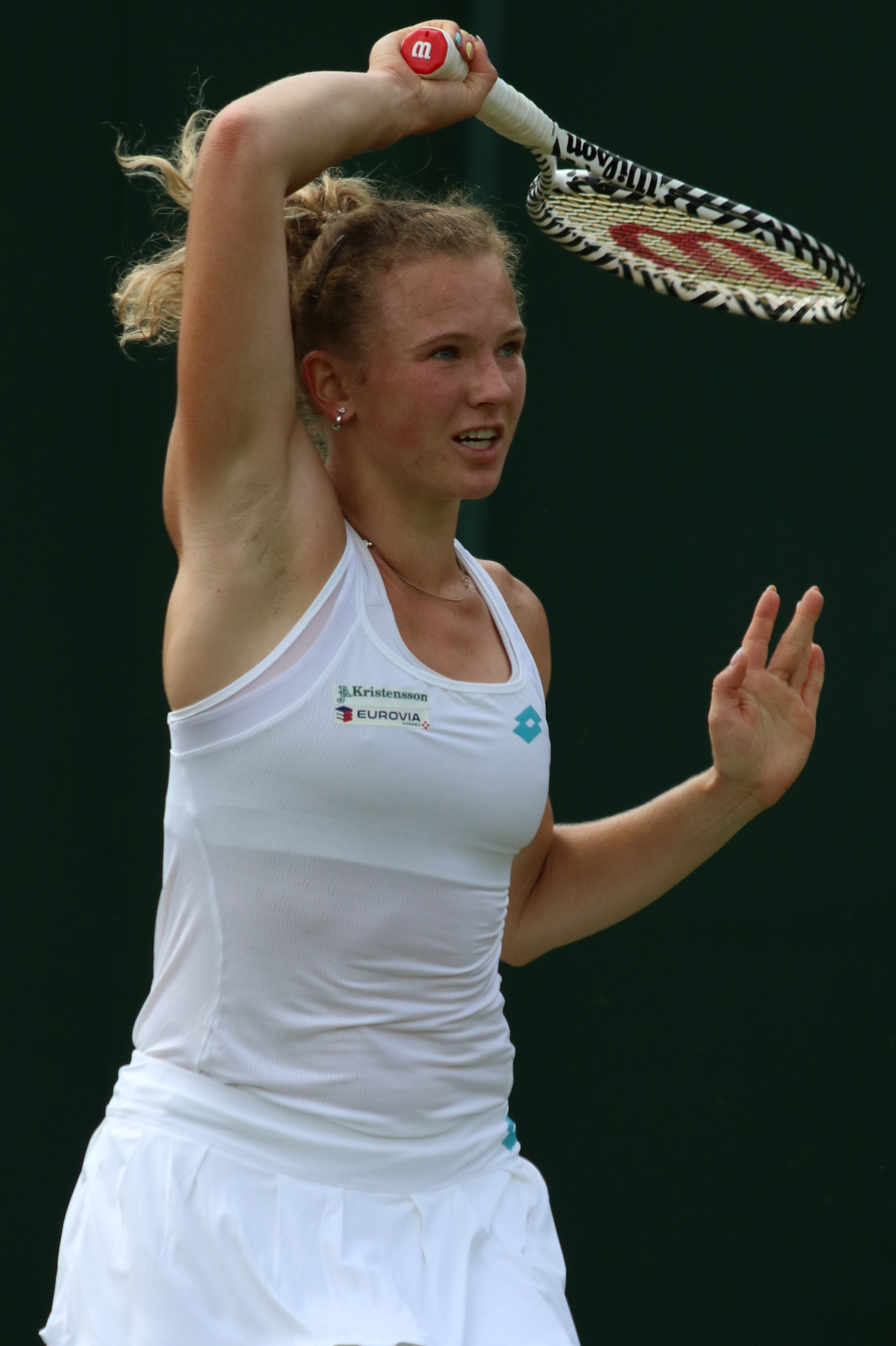
Siniaková

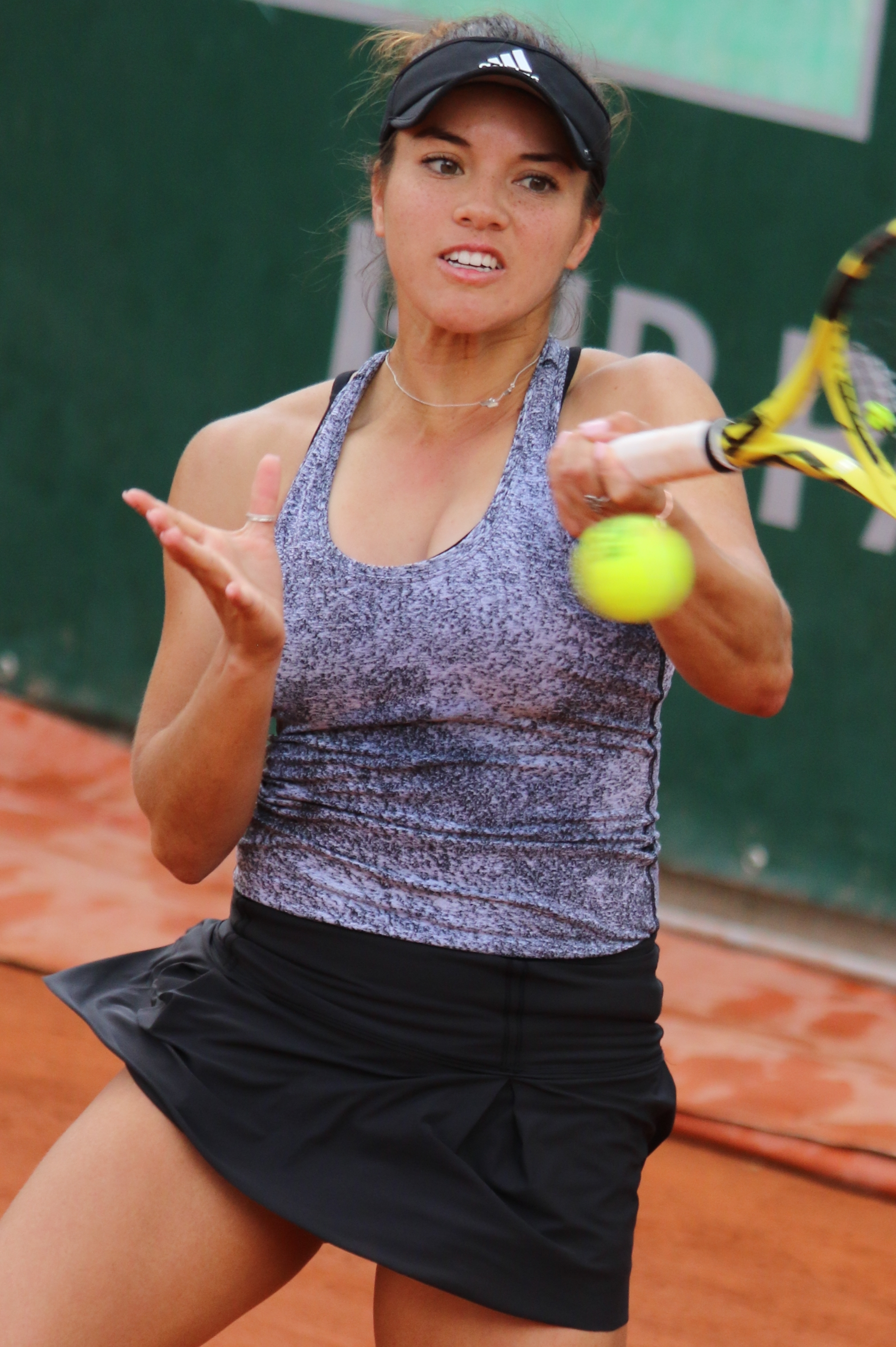
Krawczyk

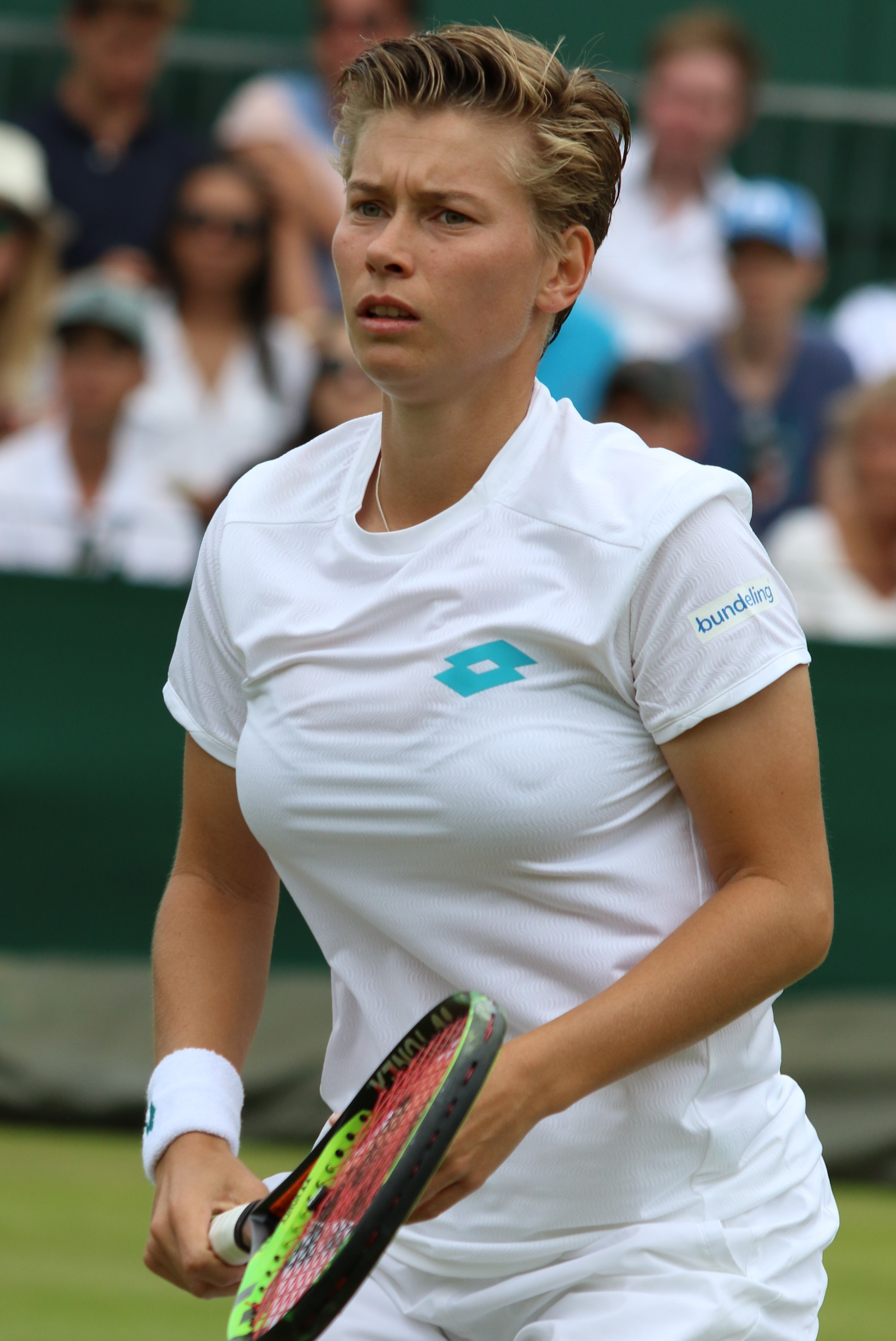
Schuurs

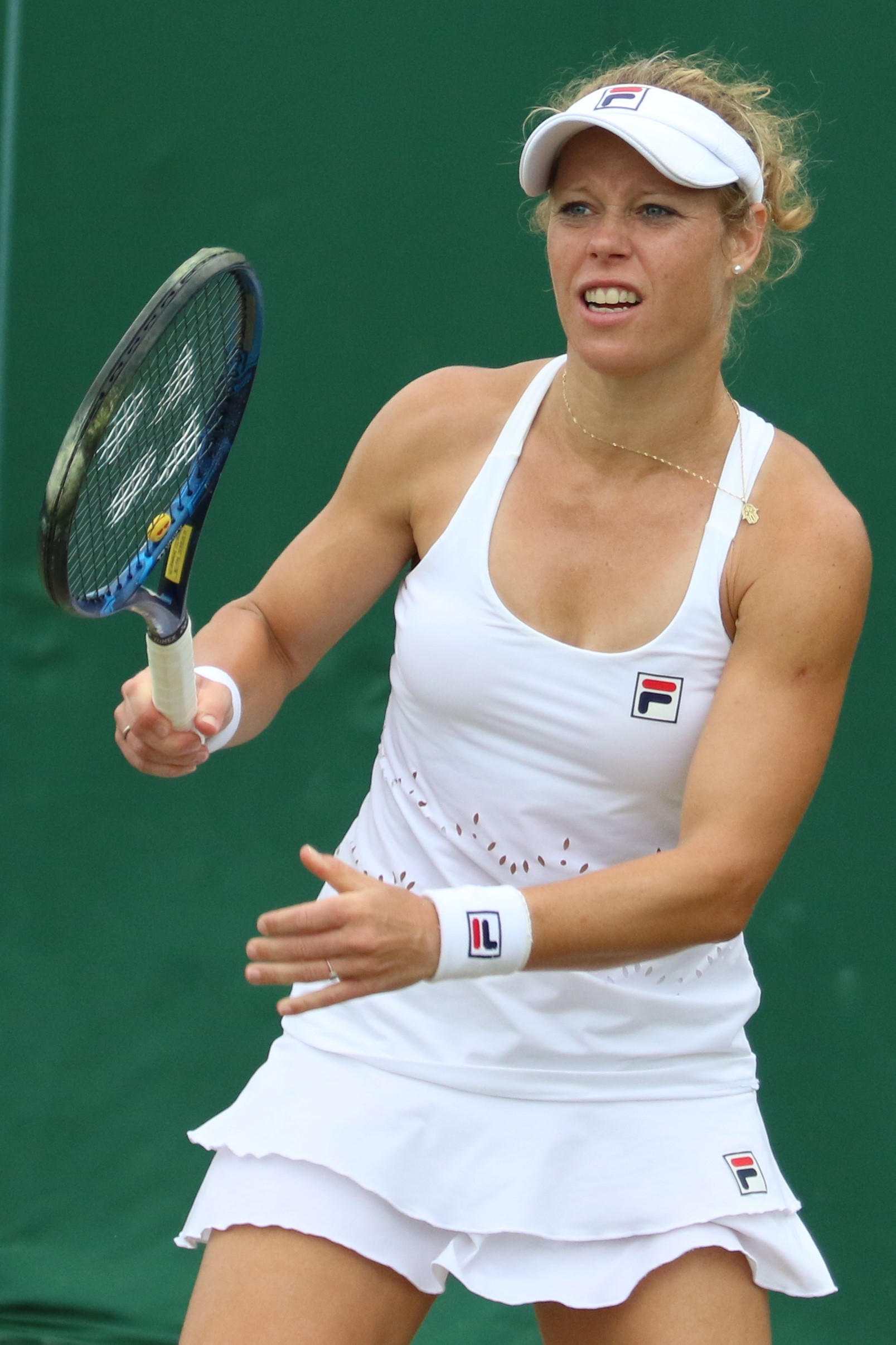
Siegemund

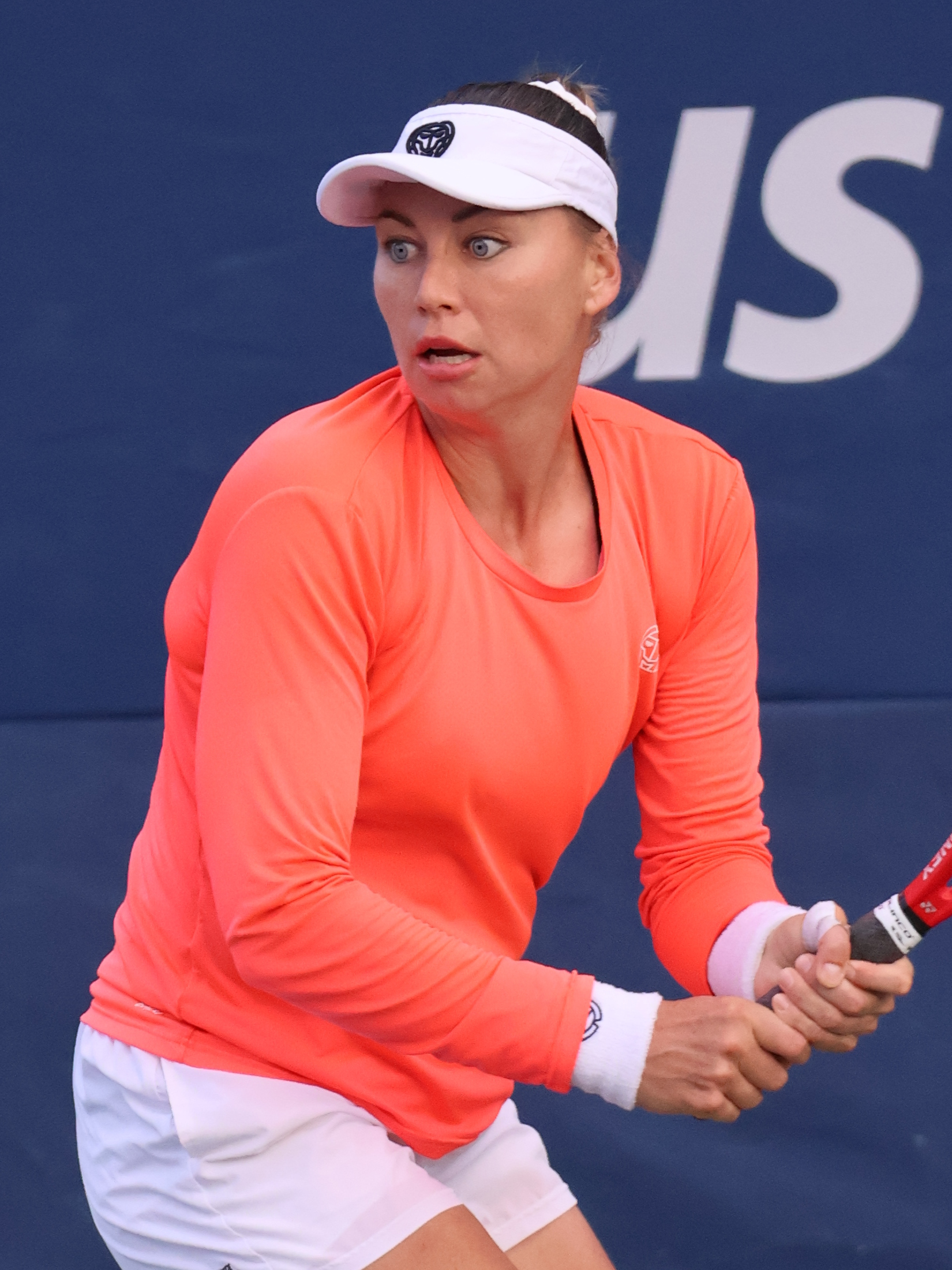
Zvonareva

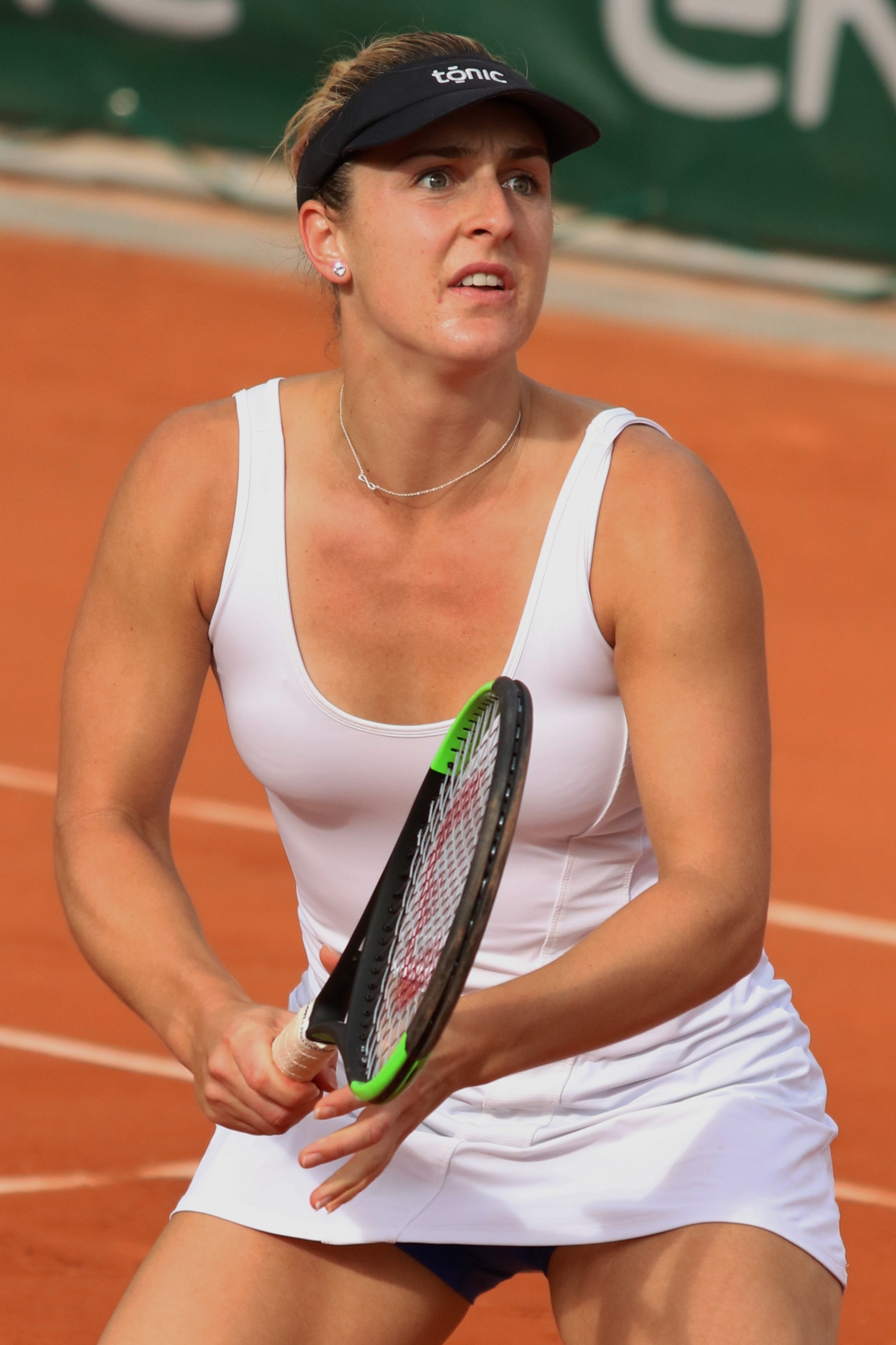
Dabrowski

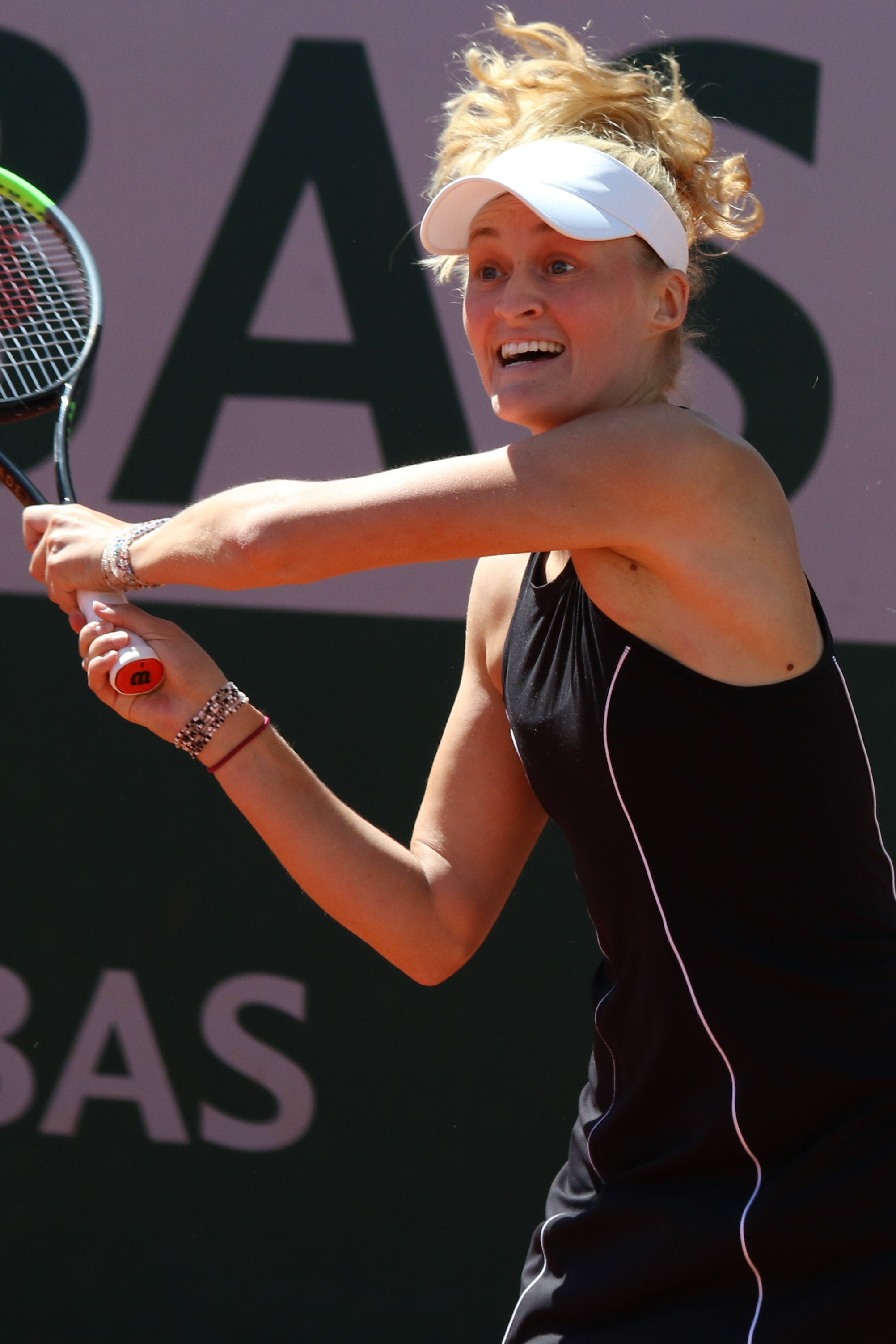
Routliffe

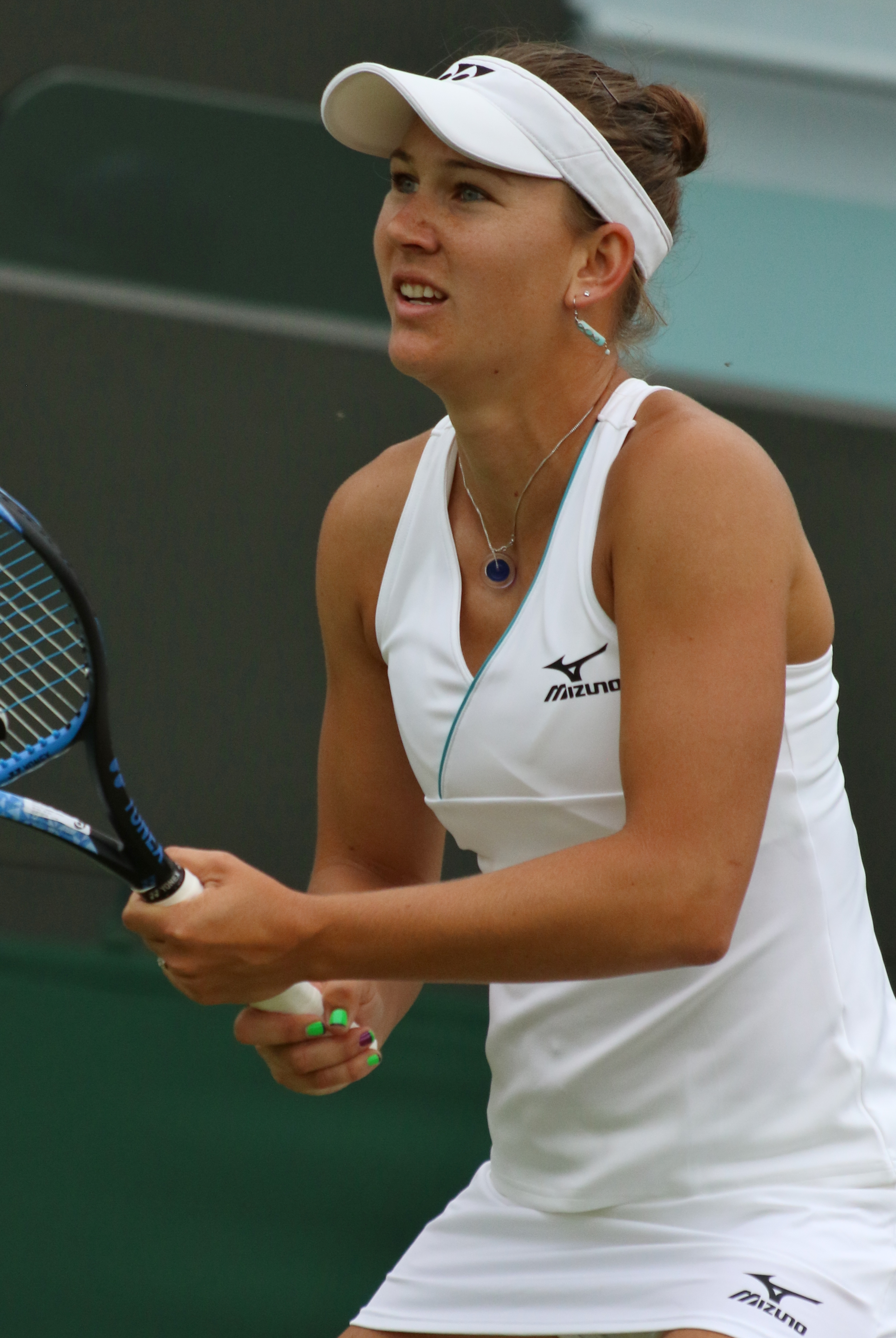
Melichar

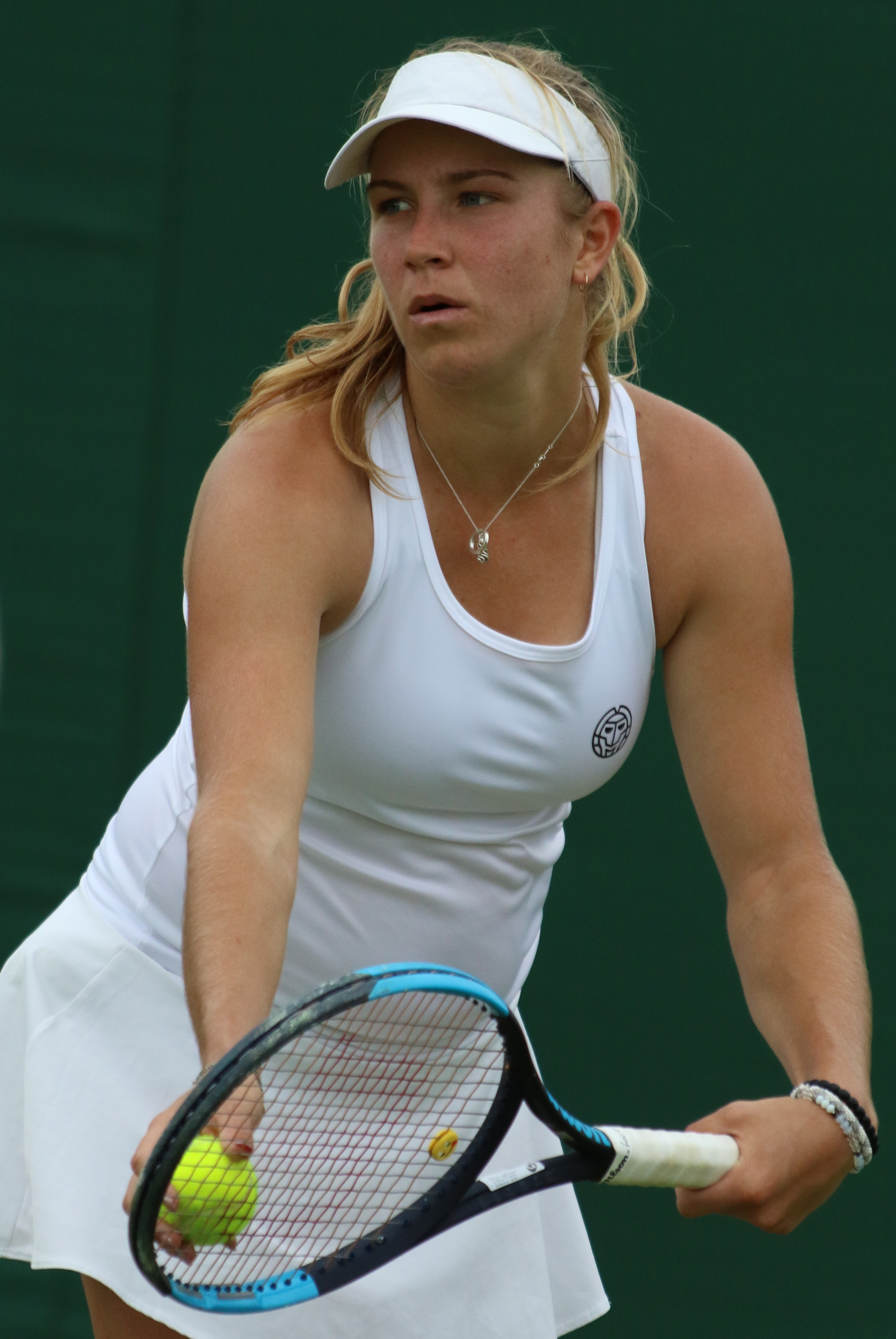
Perez

== Groupings ==
=== Singles ===
The singles draw of the 2023 edition of the Year-end Championships will feature one number-one and major champion, and two major finalists. The competitors were divided into two groups.

Bacalar Group Aryna Sabalenka [1] (Kazakhstan) Elena Rybakina [4] (United States) Jessica Pegula [5] (Greece) Maria Sakkari [8]	Chetumal Group (Poland) Iga Świątek [2] (United States) Coco Gauff [3] (Tunisia) Ons Jabeur [6] (Czech Republic) Markéta Vondroušová [7]

=== Doubles ===
The doubles draw of the 2023 edition of the Year-end Championships will feature four number-ones, three major champions and two major finalist teams. The pairs were divided into two groups.

Mahahual Group (United States) Coco Gauff [1] (United States) Jessica Pegula [1] (Czech Republic) Barbora Krejčíková [4] (Czech Republic) Kateřina Siniaková [4] (Germany) Laura Siegemund [6] Vera Zvonareva [6] (Canada) Gabriela Dabrowski [7] (New Zealand) Erin Routliffe [7]	Maya Ka'an Group (Australia) Storm Hunter [2] (Belgium) Elise Mertens [2] (Japan) Shuko Aoyama [3] (Japan) Ena Shibahara [3] (United States) Desirae Krawczyk [5] (Netherlands) Demi Schuurs [5] (United States) Nicole Melichar-Martinez [8] (Australia) Ellen Perez [8]

== Points breakdown ==
=== Singles ===
† Player qualified for WTA Finals
^{x} Player withdrew due to injury
Player qualified as alternate but chose not to play

Seed	Player	Grand Slam				WTA 1000							Best other					Total points	Tourn	Titles
Seed	Player	Grand Slam				Mandatory					Best two		Best other					Total points	Tourn	Titles
Seed	Player	AUS	FRA	WIM	USO	IW	MI	MA	IT	CH	1	2	1	2	3	4	5	Total points	Tourn	Titles
1^{†}	Aryna Sabalenka	W 2000	SF; 780	SF; 780	F 1300	F 650	QF; 215	W 1000	R64; 10	QF; 215	SF; 350	QF; 190	W 470	F 305	R16; 105	R16; 55		8,425	15	3
2^{†}	(Poland) Iga Świątek	R16; 240	W 2000	QF; 430	R16; 240	SF; 390	A 0	F 650	QF; 215	W 1000	F 585	SF; 350	W 470	W 470	SF; 350	W 280	SF; 125	7,795	17	5
3^{†}	(United States) Coco Gauff	R16; 240	QF; 430	R128; 10	W 2000	QF; 215	R32; 65	R32; 65	R32; 65	SF; 390	W 900	SF; 350	W 470	W 280	QF; 190	SF; 185	QF; 100	5,955	18	4
4^{†}	(Kazakhstan) Elena Rybakina	F 1300	R32; 130	QF; 430	R32; 130	W 1000	F 650	R64; 10	W 1000	SF; 390	SF; 350	R16; 105	R16; 105	QF; 100	R16; 55	R16; 55	R16; 55	5,865	17	2
5^{†}	(United States) Jessica Pegula	QF; 430	R32; 130	QF; 430	R16; 240	R16; 120	SF; 390	QF; 215	SF; 185	R16; 120	W 900	SF; 350	W 310	F 305	F 305	W 280	SF; 185	4,895	19	3
6^{†}	(Tunisia) Ons Jabeur	R64; 70	QF; 430	F 1300	R16; 240	R32; 65	R64; 10	A 0	QF; 100	R32; 65	QF; 190	A 0	W 470	W 280	SF; 185	SF; 185	R16; 105	3,695	18	2
7^{†}	(Czech Republic) Markéta Vondroušová	R32; 130	R64; 70	W 2000	QF; 430	R16; 120	R16; 120	R64; 65	R16; 120	R64; 10	QF; 190	R16; 105	SF; 110	QF; 100	QF; 100	R64; 1		3,671	15	1
–^{x}	(Czech Republic) Karolína Muchová	R64; 70	F 1300	R128; 10	SF; 780	QF; 215	R32; 95	R64; 35	R16; 120	A 0	F 585	QF; 190	R16; 105	QF; 60	R16; 55	R16; 30		3,650	14	0
8^{†}	(Greece) Maria Sakkari	R32; 130	R128; 10	R128; 10	R128; 10	SF; 390	R64; 10	SF; 390	SF; 105	QF; 215	W 900	R16; 105	F 305	SF; 185	SF; 185	SF; 185	SF; 110	3,245	23	1
Alternates
9	(Czech Republic) Barbora Krejčíková	R16; 240	R128; 10	R64; 70	R128; 10	R16; 120	R16; 120	R16; 120	R32; 65	R16; 55	W 900	A 0	W 470	F 305	F 180	R16; 55	R16; 55	2,775	19	2
10	(United States) Madison Keys	R32; 130	R64; 70	QF; 430	SF; 780	R64; 10	R32; 65	R32; 1	R16; 120	A 0	QF; 190	R32; 60	W 470	W 210	QF; 100	QF; 100	R32; 1	2,737	16	2

=== Doubles ===
† Team qualified for WTA Finals
Team qualified as alternates but chose not to play

Seed	Team	Points											Total points	Tourn	Titles
Seed	Team	1	2	3	4	5	6	7	8	9	10	11	Total points	Tourn	Titles
1^{†}	(United States) Coco Gauff (United States) Jessica Pegula	W 1000	SF; 780	SF; 780	F 650	F 650	W 470	QF; 430	R16; 240	QF; 190	QF; 190	SF; 185	5,565	13	2
2^{†}	(Australia) Storm Hunter (Belgium) Elise Mertens	F 1300	W 1000	W 900	QF; 430	SF; 350	SF; 350	R16; 240	QF; 215	QF; 215	R16; 120	R16; 10	5,130	12	2
3^{†}	(Japan) Shuko Aoyama (Japan) Ena Shibahara	F 1300	W 900	SF; 390	F 305	W 280	QF; 215	R32; 130	QF; 100	QF; 100	QF; 60	R32; 10	3,790	21	2
4^{†}	(Czech Republic) Barbora Krejčíková (Czech Republic) Kateřina Siniaková	W 2000	W 1000	W 470	R32; 130	QF; 105	QF; 60	R16; 10	R64; 10				3,785	8	3
5^{†}	(United States) Desirae Krawczyk (Netherlands) Demi Schuurs	F 585	W 470	W 470	QF; 430	SF; 390	SF; 350	R16; 240	QF; 190	SF; 185	R32; 130	R32; 130	3,570	18	2
6^{†}	(Germany) Laura Siegemund; Vera Zvonareva	F 1300	W 470	QF; 430	W 280	W 280	QF; 215	SF; 185	R16; 120	R16; 105	R64; 10	R32; 10	3,405	14	3
7^{†}	(Canada) Gabriela Dabrowski (New Zealand) Erin Routliffe	W 2000	F 585	W 470	SF; 110	R16; 105	R16; 105	R16; 10	R16; 1				3,386	8	2
8^{†}	(United States) Nicole Melichar-Martinez (Australia) Ellen Perez	SF; 780	F 585	SF; 390	F 305	QF; 215	QF; 190	SF; 185	SF; 185	F 180	F 180	R32; 130	3,325	24	0
Alternates
9	(Canada) Leylah Fernandez (United States) Taylor Townsend	F 1300	F 650	QF; 430	SF; 390	QF; 190	R32; 130	R16; 120	QF; 100				3,310	8	0
10	(Chinese Taipei) Hsieh Su-wei (China) Wang Xinyu	W 2000	SF; 780	R16; 105	QF; 60	R32; 10							2,955	5	1
22	(Czech Republic) Miriam Kolodziejová (Czech Republic) Markéta Vondroušová	R16; 240	R16; 240	SF; 185	R32; 130	QF; 100	R32; 10						905	6	0

== Head-to-head records ==
Below are the singles head-to-head records as they approached the tournament.

=== Singles ===
		Sabalenka	Świątek	Gauff	Rybakina	Pegula	Jabeur	Vondroušová	Sakkari	Overall	YTD W–L
1	Aryna Sabalenka		3–5	2–4	4–2	4–1	4–2	4–2	6–3	27–19	54–12
2	(Poland) Iga Świątek	5–3		8–1	1–3	5–3	4–2	2–0	2–3	27–15	63–11
3	(United States) Coco Gauff	4–2	1–8		1–0	1–2	3–2	2–0	3–4	15–18	49–13
4	(Kazakhstan) Elena Rybakina	2–4	3–1	0–1		1–2	2–3	1–1	1–1	10–13	46–13
5	(United States) Jessica Pegula	1–4	3–5	2–1	2–1		2–4	0–1	4–5	14–21	55–17
6	(Tunisia) Ons Jabeur	2–4	2–4	2–3	3–2	4–2		3–4	2–2	18–21	34–15
7	(Czech Republic) Markéta Vondroušová	2–4	0–2	0–2	1–1	1–0	4–3		1–1	9–13	38–14
8	(Greece) Maria Sakkari	3–6	3–2	4–3	1–1	5–4	2–2	1–1		19–19	38–22

=== Doubles ===
		Gauff; Pegula	Hunter; Mertens	Aoyama; Shibahara	Krejčíková; Siniaková	Krawczyk; Schuurs	Siegemund; Zvonareva	Dabrowski; Routliffe	Melichar; Perez	Overall	YTD W–L
1	(United States) Coco Gauff (United States) Jessica Pegula		1–1	1–1	0–1	2–2	1–1	0–0	2–0	7–6	35–9
2	(Australia) Storm Hunter (Belgium) Elise Mertens	1–1		0–0	0–1	0–1	0–0	1–0	0–0	2–3	28–10
3	(Japan) Shuko Aoyama (Japan) Ena Shibahara	1–1	0–0		0–2	1–0	2–0	0–2	1–0	5–5	25–19
4	(Czech Republic) Barbora Krejčíková (Czech Republic) Kateřina Siniaková	1–0	1–0	2–0		2–0	1–0	0–1	2–1	9–2	17–6
5	(United States) Desirae Krawczyk (Netherlands) Demi Schuurs	2–2	1–0	0–1	0–2		0–0	0–0	2–0	5–5	27–15
6	(Germany) Laura Siegemund; Vera Zvonareva	1–1	0–0	0–2	0–1	0–0		0–1	1–0	2–5	25–11
7	(Canada) Gabriela Dabrowski (New Zealand) Erin Routliffe	0–0	0–1	2–0	1–0	0–0	1–0		0–0	4–1	17–7
8	(United States) Nicole Melichar (Australia) Ellen Perez	0–2	0–0	0–1	1–2	0–2	0–1	0–0		1–8	27–24

== See also ==
- WTA rankings
- 2023 WTA Tour
- 2023 WTA Elite Trophy
- 2023 ATP Finals
