= 2023 Toray Pan Pacific Open =

- Date: 25 September – 1 October
- Edition: 49th
- Category: WTA 500
- Draw: 28S / 16D
- Prize money: $780,637
- Surface: Hard / outdoor
- Location: Tokyo, Japan
- Venue: Ariake Coliseum

Champions

Singles
- Veronika Kudermetova

Doubles
- (Norway) Ulrikke Eikeri / (Estonia) Ingrid Neel
← 2022 ·	Pan Pacific Open	· 2024 →

The 2023 Toray Pan Pacific Open was a professional women's tennis tournament played on outdoor hard courts. It was the 49th edition of the Pan Pacific Open, and part of the WTA 500 tournaments of the 2023 WTA Tour. It took place at the Ariake Coliseum in Tokyo, Japan from 25 September to 1 October 2023.

== Finals ==
=== Singles ===
- Veronika Kudermetova defeated (United States) Jessica Pegula, 7–5, 6–1

=== Doubles ===
- (Norway) Ulrikke Eikeri / (Estonia) Ingrid Neel defeated (Japan) Eri Hozumi / (Japan) Makoto Ninomiya 3–6, 7–5, [10–5]

== Points and prize money ==
=== Point distribution ===
Event	W	F	SF	QF	Round of 16	Round of 32	Q	Q2	Q1
Singles	470	305	185	100	55	1	25	13	1
Doubles	470	305	185	100	1	—	—	—	—

== Singles main draw entrants ==
=== Seeds ===
Country	Player	Rank	Seeds
POL	Iga Świątek	2	1
USA	Jessica Pegula	4	2
~~KAZ~~	~~Elena Rybakina~~	~~5~~	~~3~~
GRE	Maria Sakkari	9	4
FRA	Caroline Garcia	11	5
	Daria Kasatkina	13	6
	Liudmila Samsonova	17	7
	Veronika Kudermetova	19	8

- Rankings are as of 18 September 2023

=== Other entrants ===
The following players received wild cards into the main singles draw:

- Anna Kalinskaya
- (Japan) Moyuka Uchijima

The following players received entry from the singles qualifying draw:

- (United Kingdom) Harriet Dart
- (Japan) Misaki Doi
- (Japan) Mai Hontama
- (Japan) ~~Natsumi Kawaguchi~~
- (Greece) Despina Papamichail
- (Japan) Rina Saigo

The following players received entry as lucky losers:

- (Japan) Sakura Hosogi
- (Japan) Himeno Sakatsume

=== Withdrawals ===
- (Switzerland) Belinda Bencic → replaced by (Germany) Tatjana Maria
- (Japan) Natsumi Kawaguchi → replaced by (Japan) Sakura Hosogi
- (Czech Republic) Barbora Krejčíková → replaced by (Spain) Cristina Bucșa
- (Poland) Magda Linette → replaced by (Croatia) Petra Martić
- (Czech Republic) Karolína Muchová → replaced by (Ukraine) Anhelina Kalinina
- (Czech Republic) Karolína Plíšková → replaced by (Ukraine) Marta Kostyuk
- (Kazakhstan) Elena Rybakina → replaced by (Japan) Himeno Sakatsume
- (Czech Republic) Markéta Vondroušová → replaced by (Czech Republic) Linda Nosková

== Doubles main draw entrants ==
=== Seeds ===
Country	Player	Country	Player	Rank^{1}	Seed
CAN	Gabriela Dabrowski	NZL	Erin Routliffe	29	1
JPN	Shuko Aoyama	JPN	Ena Shibahara	30	2
MEX	Giuliana Olmos	BRA	Luisa Stefani	34	3
USA	Nicole Melichar-Martinez	AUS	Ellen Perez	41	4

- Rankings are as of 18 September 2023

=== Other entrants ===
The following pairs received wildcards into the doubles main draw:

- (Japan) Mai Hontama / (Japan) Moyuka Uchijima
- (Japan) Natsumi Kawaguchi / (Japan) Yuki Naito
