= 2023 Eastbourne International – Men's singles =

Men's singles
- 2023 Eastbourne International

Final
- Champion: (Argentina) Francisco Cerúndolo
- Runner-up: (United States) Tommy Paul
- Score: 6–4, 1–6, 6–4

Details
- Draw: 28
- Seeds: 8

Events
Singles	men	women
Doubles	men	women
← 2022 ·	Eastbourne International	· 2024 →

Francisco Cerúndolo won the men's singles title, defeating Tommy Paul in the final, 6–4, 1–6, 6–4.

Taylor Fritz was the defending champion, but lost in the second round to Mackenzie McDonald.

== Seeds ==
The top four seeds received a bye into the second round.

1. (United States) Taylor Fritz (second round)
2. (United States) Tommy Paul (final)
3. (Australia) Alex de Minaur (withdrew)
4. (Argentina) Francisco Cerúndolo (champion)
5. (Chile) Nicolás Jarry (second round)
6. (Argentina) Tomás Martín Etcheverry (first round)
7. (Italy) Lorenzo Sonego (first round)
8. (Serbia) Miomir Kecmanović (quarterfinals)
9. (Netherlands) Botic van de Zandschulp (first round)

== Draw ==
=== Key ===
- Q = Qualifier
- WC = Wild card
- LL = Lucky loser
- Alt = Alternate
- SE = Special exempt
- PR = Protected ranking
- ITF = ITF entry
- JE = Junior exempt
- w/o = Walkover
- r = Retired
- d = Defaulted
- SR = Special ranking

=== Finals ===
Semifinals
(United States) Mackenzie McDonald	6	5	2
4	(Argentina) Francisco Cerúndolo	2	7	6
(France) Grégoire Barrère	4	3
2	(United States) Tommy Paul	6	6

Final
4	(Argentina) Francisco Cerúndolo	6	1	6
2	(United States) Tommy Paul	4	6	4

=== Top half ===
First round
(Italy) M Cecchinato	3	3
(United States) M McDonald	6	6
WC	(United Kingdom) L Broady	6	6
LL	(United Kingdom) J Choinski	3	4
(Sweden) M Ymer	3	6	6
9	(Netherlands) B van de Zandschulp	6	4	2
WC	(United Kingdom) R Peniston	3	2
Q	(Switzerland) M-A Hüsler	6	6
Q	(Colombia) DE Galán	4	5
(United States) M Cressy	6	7
(China) Z Zhang	7^{7}	6
7	(Italy) L Sonego	6^{4}	3

Second round
1	(United States) T Fritz	6^{3}	6^{8}
(United States) M McDonald	7^{7}	7^{10}
WC	(United Kingdom) L Broady	2	4
(Sweden) M Ymer	6	6
4	(Argentina) F Cerúndolo	7^{7}	7^{7}
Q	(Switzerland) M-A Hüsler	6^{2}	6^{5}
(United States) M Cressy	6	5	4
(China) Z Zhang	3	7	6

Quarterfinals
(United States) M McDonald	6	3	6
(Sweden) M Ymer	4	6	3
4	(Argentina) F Cerúndolo	6	6
(China) Z Zhang	2	3

Semifinals
(United States) M McDonald	6	5	2
4	(Argentina) F Cerúndolo	2	7	6

=== Bottom half ===
First round
8	(Serbia) M Kecmanović	7^{7}	7^{7}
(China) Y Wu	6^{4}	6^{5}
(United States) B Nakashima	7^{7}	6^{3}	6^{5}
Q	(Australia) A Vukic	6^{5}	7^{7}	7^{7}
(France) G Barrère	3	7^{8}	7^{7}
(Finland) E Ruusuvuori	6	6^{6}	6^{4}
6	(Argentina) TM Etcheverry	2	4
(United States) JJ Wolf	6	6
Q	(France) L Van Assche	2	7^{7}	7^{7}
WC	(United Kingdom) G Loffhagen	6	6^{5}	6^{4}
(Portugal) N Borges	3	4
(Argentina) S Báez	6	6

Second round
8	(Serbia) M Kecmanović	7^{8}	6
Q	(Australia) A Vukic	6^{6}	4
(France) G Barrère	6	4	6
5	(Chile) N Jarry	3	6	4
(United States) JJ Wolf	6	6^{5}	6
Q	(France) L Van Assche	2	7^{7}	1
(Argentina) S Báez	1	6^{7}
2	(United States) T Paul	6	7^{9}

Quarterfinals
8	(Serbia) M Kecmanović	5	6^{2}
(France) G Barrère	7	7^{7}
(United States) JJ Wolf	4	6	6^{2}
2	(United States) T Paul	6	4	7^{7}

Semifinals
(France) G Barrère	4	3
2	(United States) T Paul	6	6

== Qualifying ==
=== Seeds ===
1. (France) Luca Van Assche (qualified)
2. (Switzerland) Marc-Andrea Hüsler (qualified)
3. (Colombia) Daniel Elahi Galán (qualified)
4. (Australia) Aleksandar Vukic (qualified)
5. (Argentina) Juan Manuel Cerúndolo (first round)
6. (Croatia) Borna Gojo (qualifying competition)
7. (United Kingdom) Jan Choinski (qualifying competition, lucky loser)
8. (Kazakhstan) Beibit Zhukayev (qualifying competition)

=== Qualifiers ===
1. (France) Luca Van Assche
2. (Switzerland) Marc-Andrea Hüsler
3. (Colombia) Daniel Elahi Galán
4. (Australia) Aleksandar Vukic

=== Lucky loser ===
1. (United Kingdom) Jan Choinski

=== Qualifying draw ===
==== First qualifier ====
First round
1	(France) Luca Van Assche	6	6
Alt	(India) Mukund Sasikumar	4	0
(Norway) Viktor Durasovic	4	3
6	(Croatia) Borna Gojo	6	6

Qualifying competition
1	(France) Luca Van Assche	6	7^{8}
6	(Croatia) Borna Gojo	4	6^{6}

==== Second qualifier ====
First round
2	(Switzerland) Marc-Andrea Hüsler	6	6
(Czech Republic) Marek Gengel	2	2
WC	(United Kingdom) Daniel Little	4	4
8/Alt	(Kazakhstan) Beibit Zhukayev	6	6

Qualifying competition
2	(Switzerland) Marc-Andrea Hüsler	6	6
8/Alt	(Kazakhstan) Beibit Zhukayev	4	3

==== Third qualifier ====
First round
3	(Colombia) Daniel Elahi Galán	7^{8}	7^{7}
(France) Maxime Janvier	6^{6}	6^{4}
WC	(United Kingdom) Giles Hussey	3	6	2
7	(United Kingdom) Jan Choinski	6	4	6

Qualifying competition
3	(Colombia) Daniel Elahi Galán	7^{7}	6
7	(United Kingdom) Jan Choinski	6^{5}	4

==== Fourth qualifier ====
First round
4	(Australia) Aleksandar Vukic	6	6
Alt	(United Kingdom) Arthur Fery	1	4
(Tunisia) Skander Mansouri	6	6
5	(Argentina) Juan Manuel Cerúndolo	4	4

Qualifying competition
4	(Australia) Aleksandar Vukic	6	6
(Tunisia) Skander Mansouri	3	2
