= 2023 Eastbourne International – Men's doubles =

Men's doubles
- 2023 Eastbourne International

Final
- Champions: (Croatia) Nikola Mektić (Croatia) Mate Pavić
- Runners-up: (Croatia) Ivan Dodig (United States) Austin Krajicek
- Score: 6–4, 6–2

Details
- Draw: 16
- Seeds: 4

Events
Singles	men	women
Doubles	men	women
- Eastbourne International

Two-time defending champions Nikola Mektić and Mate Pavić defeated Ivan Dodig and Austin Krajicek in the final, 6–4, 6–2, to win the men's doubles tennis title at the 2023 Eastbourne International. The duo did not lose a set en route to their third title of the season and sixth overall grass title together. Dodig and Krajicek were contending for their third consecutive title following their victories at the French Open and Queen's Club.

== Seeds ==
1. (Croatia) Ivan Dodig / (United States) Austin Krajicek (final)
2. (United States) Rajeev Ram / (United Kingdom) Joe Salisbury (semifinals)
3. (Monaco) Hugo Nys / (Poland) Jan Zieliński (quarterfinals)
4. (Croatia) Nikola Mektić / (Croatia) Mate Pavić (champions)

== Draw ==
Key

- Q = Qualifier
- WC = Wild card
- LL = Lucky loser
- Alt = Alternate
- ITF = ITF entry
- PR = Protected ranking
- SR = Special ranking
- SE = Special exempt
- JE = Junior exempt
- JR = Junior Accelerator Programme entrant
- CO = College Accelerator Programme entrant
- NG = Next Gen Accelerator Program entrant
- w/o = Walkover
- r = Retired
- d = Defaulted

=== Draw ===
First round
1	(Croatia) I Dodig (United States) A Krajicek	7	6
(Argentina) F Cerúndolo (Argentina) TM Etcheverry	5	2
WC	(United Kingdom) L Broady (United Kingdom) J O'Mara	6	7^{8}
WC	(United Kingdom) J Cash (United Kingdom) L Johnson	4	6^{6}
3	(Monaco) H Nys (Poland) J Zieliński	6	6
(France) A Olivetti (Spain) D Vega Hernández	2	3
(Australia) M Ebden (Australia) J-P Smith	4	6	[10]
(Colombia) N Barrientos (Colombia) JS Cabal	6	4	[7]
(Ecuador) G Escobar (Kazakhstan) A Nedovyesov	6^{4}	7^{12}	[10]
(Sweden) A Göransson (Japan) B McLachlan	7^{7}	6^{10}	[5]
(United Kingdom) J Murray (New Zealand) M Venus	6^{5}	4
4	(Croatia) N Mektić (Croatia) M Pavić	7^{7}	6
(Monaco) R Arneodo (Austria) S Weissborn	6	6^{5}	[11]
(United Kingdom) L Glasspool (France) N Mahut	4	7^{7}	[9]
(United States) R Galloway (Mexico) MÁ Reyes-Varela	3	7^{8}	[11]
2	(United States) R Ram (United Kingdom) J Salisbury	6	6^{6}	[13]

Quarterfinals
1	(Croatia) I Dodig (United States) A Krajicek	6	6
WC	(United Kingdom) L Broady (United Kingdom) J O'Mara	4	4
3	(Monaco) H Nys (Poland) J Zieliński	6	3	[7]
(Australia) M Ebden (Australia) J-P Smith	4	6	[10]
(Ecuador) G Escobar (Kazakhstan) A Nedovyesov	4	4
4	(Croatia) N Mektić (Croatia) M Pavić	6	6
(Monaco) R Arneodo (Austria) S Weissborn	1	2
2	(United States) R Ram (United Kingdom) J Salisbury	6	6

Semifinals
1	(Croatia) I Dodig (United States) A Krajicek	7	4	[10]
(Australia) M Ebden (Australia) J-P Smith	5	6	[7]
4	(Croatia) N Mektić (Croatia) M Pavić	6	6
2	(United States) R Ram (United Kingdom) J Salisbury	2	2

Final
1	(Croatia) I Dodig (United States) A Krajicek	4	2
4	(Croatia) N Mektić (Croatia) M Pavić	6	6
