= 2023 Qatar Total Open – Singles =

Singles
- 2023 Qatar Total Open

Final
- Champion: (Poland) Iga Świątek
- Runner-up: (United States) Jessica Pegula
- Score: 6–3, 6–0

Details
- Draw: 28
- Seeds: 8

Events
Singles	Doubles
- Qatar Total Open

Defending champion Iga Świątek defeated Jessica Pegula in the final, 6–3, 6–0 to win the singles tennis title at the 2023 WTA Qatar Open. Światek lost only five games across three matches en route to the title, the record fewest en route to a WTA Tour-level title (breaking Chris Evert's record from 1981).

== Seeds ==
The top four seeds received a bye into the second round.

1. (Poland) Iga Świątek (champion)
2. (United States) Jessica Pegula (final)
3. (France) Caroline Garcia (quarterfinals)
4. (United States) Coco Gauff (quarterfinals)
5. (Greece) Maria Sakkari (semifinals)
6. Daria Kasatkina (second round)
7. (Switzerland) Belinda Bencic (quarterfinals, withdrew)
8. Veronika Kudermetova (semifinals)

== Draw ==
=== Finals ===
Semifinals
1	(Poland) Iga Świątek	6	6
8	Veronika Kudermetova	0	1
5/WC	(Greece) Maria Sakkari	2	6	1
2	(United States) Jessica Pegula	6	4	6

Final
1	(Poland) Iga Świątek	6	6
2	(United States) Jessica Pegula	3	0

=== Top half ===
First round
Q	(Belgium) E Mertens	4	6^{6}
(United States) D Collins	6	7^{8}
WC	(Turkey) İ Öz	1	1
WC	V Azarenka	6	6
Q	(Bulgaria) V Tomova	0	1
7	(Switzerland) B Bencic	6	6
(Czech Republic) P Kvitová	7	6
(China) S Zhang	5	2
WC	(United States) S Kenin	6	6
L Samsonova	3	1
(Czech Republic) B Krejčíková	4	6	6^{5}
8	V Kudermetova	6	3	7^{7}

Second round
1	(Poland) I Świątek	6	6
(United States) D Collins	0	1
WC	V Azarenka	6	6^{4}	4
7	(Switzerland) B Bencic	1	7^{7}	6
4	(United States) C Gauff	6	7^{8}
(Czech Republic) P Kvitová	3	6^{6}
WC	(United States) S Kenin	2	5
8	V Kudermetova	6	7

Quarterfinals
1	(Poland) I Świątek	w/o
7	(Switzerland) B Bencic
4	(United States) C Gauff	2	6	1
8	V Kudermetova	6	3	6

Semifinals
1	(Poland) I Świątek	6	6
8	V Kudermetova	0	1

=== Bottom half ===
First round
5/WC	(Greece) M Sakkari	6	3	6
SE	(China) Q Zheng	2	6	3
E Alexandrova	6	6
Q	(Czech Republic) Ka Plíšková	1	2
PR	(Czech Republic) K Muchová	6	6
(Italy) M Trevisan	2	2
6	D Kasatkina	7^{7}	6
Q	(Canada) R Marino	6^{5}	2
(Spain) P Badosa	6^{6}	3
(Brazil) B Haddad Maia	7^{8}	6
(United States) M Keys	5	2
(Latvia) J Ostapenko	7	6

Second round
5/WC	(Greece) M Sakkari	6	6
E Alexandrova	3	2
PR	(Czech Republic) K Muchová	7^{7}	5	4
3	(France) C Garcia	6^{3}	7	6
6	D Kasatkina	3	6^{7}
(Brazil) B Haddad Maia	6	7^{9}
(Latvia) J Ostapenko	2	6	5
2	(United States) J Pegula	6	2	7

Quarterfinals
5/WC	(Greece) M Sakkari	6	6^{5}	7^{7}
3	(France) C Garcia	2	7^{7}	6^{5}
(Brazil) B Haddad Maia	3	2
2	(United States) J Pegula	6	6

Semifinals
5/WC	(Greece) M Sakkari	2	6	1
2	(United States) J Pegula	6	4	6

== Qualifying ==
=== Seeds ===
1. (Czech Republic) Karolína Plíšková (qualified)
2. (Czech Republic) Marie Bouzková (qualifying competition)
3. (Switzerland) Jil Teichmann (second round)
4. (Ukraine) Anhelina Kalinina (first round)
5. (Belgium) Elise Mertens (qualified)
6. Aliaksandra Sasnovich (second round)
7. (Canada) Leylah Fernandez (qualifying competition)
8. (United States) Bernarda Pera (second round)

=== Qualifiers ===
1. (Czech Republic) Karolína Plíšková
2. (Canada) Rebecca Marino
3. (Belgium) Elise Mertens
4. (Bulgaria) Viktoriya Tomova

=== Qualifying draw ===
==== First qualifier ====
First round
1	(Czech Republic) Karolína Plíšková	3	6	6
(Romania) Ana Bogdan	6	2	3
(United Kingdom) Harriet Dart	6	6
(Slovenia) Dalila Jakupović	4	1
(United States) Claire Liu	3	4
(Ukraine) Dayana Yastremska	6	6
(Italy) Jasmine Paolini	2	4
7	(Canada) Leylah Fernandez	6	6

Second round
1	(Czech Republic) Karolína Plíšková	6	6
(United Kingdom) Harriet Dart	1	2
(Ukraine) Dayana Yastremska	6	3	3
7	(Canada) Leylah Fernandez	3	6	6

Qualifying competition
1	(Czech Republic) Karolína Plíšková	6	7
7	(Canada) Leylah Fernandez	2	5

==== Second qualifier ====
First round
2	(Czech Republic) Marie Bouzková	6	6
(Germany) Laura Siegemund	1	1
(Czech Republic) Tereza Martincová	1	6	6
(Uzbekistan) Nigina Abduraimova	6	3	4
(Canada) Rebecca Marino	6	0	6
PR	(Ukraine) Katarina Zavatska	3	6	3
Alt	(United States) Bethanie Mattek-Sands	2	4
6	Aliaksandra Sasnovich	6	6

Second round
2	(Czech Republic) Marie Bouzková	6	6
(Czech Republic) Tereza Martincová	4	1
(Canada) Rebecca Marino	6	3	6
6	Aliaksandra Sasnovich	3	6	4

Qualifying competition
2	(Czech Republic) Marie Bouzková	5	1
(Canada) Rebecca Marino	7	6

==== Third qualifier ====
First round
3	(Switzerland) Jil Teichmann	6	6
(Romania) Sorana Cîrstea	4	3
(Japan) Moyuka Uchijima	2	0
(Romania) Elena-Gabriela Ruse	6	6
WC	(France) Diane Parry	6	3	0
(Poland) Magdalena Fręch	4	6	6
WC	(Qatar) Mubaraka Al-Naimi	0	0
5	(Belgium) Elise Mertens	6	6

Second round
3	(Switzerland) Jil Teichmann	7^{7}	6^{1}	4
(Romania) Elena-Gabriela Ruse	6^{5}	7^{7}	6
(Poland) Magdalena Fręch	2	6	0
5	(Belgium) Elise Mertens	6	3	6

Qualifying competition
(Romania) Elena-Gabriela Ruse	4	6	4
5	(Belgium) Elise Mertens	6	2	6

==== Fourth qualifier ====
First round
4	(Ukraine) Anhelina Kalinina	5	6^{3}
(United States) Lauren Davis	7	7^{7}
(Belgium) Maryna Zanevska	5	0^{r}
(Bulgaria) Viktoriya Tomova	7	0
WC	Ekaterina Yashina	4	2
(United States) Madison Brengle	6	6
Anna Kalinskaya	1	6	6^{4}
8	(United States) Bernarda Pera	6	2	7^{7}

Second round
(United States) Lauren Davis	6	6^{4}	1^{r}
(Bulgaria) Viktoriya Tomova	3	7^{7}	2
(United States) Madison Brengle	6	6
8	(United States) Bernarda Pera	1	2

Qualifying competition
(Bulgaria) Viktoriya Tomova	6	6
(United States) Madison Brengle	3	3
