= 2023 Toray Pan Pacific Open – Doubles =

Doubles
- 2023 Toray Pan Pacific Open

Final
- Champions: (Norway) Ulrikke Eikeri (Estonia) Ingrid Neel
- Runners-up: (Japan) Eri Hozumi (Japan) Makoto Ninomiya
- Score: 3–6, 7–5, [10–5]

Details
- Draw: 16
- Seeds: 4

Events
Singles	Doubles
← 2022 ·	Pan Pacific Open	· 2024 →

Ulrikke Eikeri and Ingrid Neel defeated Eri Hozumi and Makoto Ninomiya in the final, 3–6, 7–5, [10–5] to win the doubles tennis title at the 2023 Toray Pan Pacific Open.

Gabriela Dabrowski and Giuliana Olmos were the defending champions, but they chose not to compete together. Dabrowski partnered Erin Routliffe, but lost in the first round to Hozumi and Ninomiya. Olmos partnered Luisa Stefani, but lost in the first round to Veronika Kudermetova and Anastasia Pavlyuchenkova.

== Seeds ==
1. (Canada) Gabriela Dabrowski / (New Zealand) Erin Routliffe (first round)
2. (Japan) Shuko Aoyama / (Japan) Ena Shibahara (quarterfinals)
3. (Mexico) Giuliana Olmos / (Brazil) Luisa Stefani (first round)
4. (United States) Nicole Melichar-Martinez / (Australia) Ellen Perez (semifinals)

== Draw ==
=== Key ===
- Q = Qualifier
- WC = Wild card
- LL = Lucky loser
- Alt = Alternate
- ITF = ITF entry
- PR = Protected ranking
- SR = Special ranking
- SE = Special exempt
- JE = Junior exempt
- JR = Junior Accelerator Programme entrant
- CO = College Accelerator Programme entrant
- NG = Next Gen Accelerator Program entrant
- w/o = Walkover
- r = Retired
- d = Defaulted

=== Draw ===
First round
1	(Canada) G Dabrowski (New Zealand) E Routliffe	6	4	[7]
(Japan) E Hozumi (Japan) M Ninomiya	4	6	[10]
L Marozava (Netherlands) B Schoofs	5	4
(Mexico) F Contreras (Greece) D Papamichail	7	6
3	(Mexico) G Olmos (Brazil) L Stefani	5	7^{7}	[8]
V Kudermetova; A Pavlyuchenkova	7	6^{3}	[10]
(Japan) M Kato (Ukraine) N Kichenok	7^{7}	6
WC	(Japan) N Kawaguchi (Japan) Y Naito	6^{2}	1
(Spain) C Bucșa (Brazil) I Gamarra Martins	3	7	[6]
E Alexandrova; A Kalinskaya	6	5	[10]
(United Kingdom) H Dart (Georgia (country)) O Kalashnikova	4	4
4	(United States) N Melichar-Martinez (Australia) E Perez	6	6
(United States) A Krueger (United States) J Pegula	4	6	[5]
(Norway) U Eikeri (Estonia) I Neel	6	3	[10]
WC	(Japan) M Hontama (Japan) M Uchijima	6^{5}	6	[6]
2	(Japan) S Aoyama (Japan) E Shibahara	7^{7}	1	[10]

Quarterfinals
(Japan) E Hozumi (Japan) M Ninomiya	6	6
(Mexico) F Contreras (Greece) D Papamichail	2	3
V Kudermetova; A Pavlyuchenkova	6	4	[6]
(Japan) M Kato (Ukraine) N Kichenok	0	6	[10]
E Alexandrova; A Kalinskaya
4	(United States) N Melichar-Martinez (Australia) E Perez	w/o
(Norway) U Eikeri (Estonia) I Neel	6	6
2	(Japan) S Aoyama (Japan) E Shibahara	2	4

Semifinals
(Japan) E Hozumi (Japan) M Ninomiya	6	6
(Japan) M Kato (Ukraine) N Kichenok	2	4
4	(United States) N Melichar-Martinez (Australia) E Perez	4	6	[9]
(Norway) U Eikeri (Estonia) I Neel	6	4	[11]

Final
(Japan) E Hozumi (Japan) M Ninomiya	6	5	[5]
(Norway) U Eikeri (Estonia) I Neel	3	7	[10]
