= 2023 Eastbourne International – Women's doubles =

Women's doubles
- 2023 Eastbourne International

Final
- Champions: (United States) Desirae Krawczyk (Netherlands) Demi Schuurs
- Runners-up: (United States) Nicole Melichar-Martinez (Australia) Ellen Perez
- Score: 6–2, 6–4

Events
Singles	men	women
Doubles	men	women
← 2022 ·	Eastbourne International	· 2024 →

Desirae Krawczyk and Demi Schuurs defeated Nicole Melichar-Martinez and Ellen Perez in the final, 6–2, 6–4 to win the women's doubles tennis title at the 2023 Eastbourne International.

Aleksandra Krunić and Magda Linette were the reigning champions, but chose not to compete this year.

== Seeds ==
1. (United States) Coco Gauff / (United States) Jessica Pegula (semifinals, withdrew)
2. (United States) Nicole Melichar-Martinez / (Australia) Ellen Perez (final)
3. (United States) Desirae Krawczyk / (Netherlands) Demi Schuurs (champions)
4. (Ukraine) Lyudmyla Kichenok / (Latvia) Jeļena Ostapenko (semifinals, withdrew)

== Draw ==
=== Key ===
- Q = Qualifier
- WC = Wild card
- LL = Lucky loser
- Alt = Alternate
- SE = Special exempt
- PR = Protected ranking
- ITF = ITF entry
- JE = Junior exempt
- w/o = Walkover
- r = Retired
- d = Defaulted
- SR = Special ranking

=== Draw ===
First round
1	(United States) C Gauff (United States) J Pegula	6	6
(Kazakhstan) Y Putintseva; K Rakhimova	2	1
(United States) C Dolehide (China) S Zhang	7	6
(Czech Republic) M Bouzková (Spain) S Sorribes Tormo	5	2
3	(United States) D Krawczyk (Netherlands) D Schuurs	6	6
(United States) A Muhammad (Mexico) G Olmos	4	2
(Japan) S Aoyama (Japan) E Shibahara	5	5
(Kazakhstan) A Danilina (China) Y Xu	7	7
WC	(Czech Republic) T Martincová (Czech Republic) B Strýcová	6	5	[11]
PR	(Canada) G Dabrowski (Australia) D Saville	3	7	[13]
(Japan) M Kato (Indonesia) A Sutjiadi	3	4
4	(Ukraine) L Kichenok (Latvia) J Ostapenko	6	6
(Brazil) L Stefani (China) Z Yang	7	0
WC	(United Kingdom) H Dart (United Kingdom) H Watson	5	0^{r}
(Chinese Taipei) H-c Chan (Chinese Taipei) L Chan	3	6	[8]
2	(United States) N Melichar-Martinez (Australia) E Perez	6	3	[10]

Quarterfinals
1	(United States) C Gauff (United States) J Pegula	6	6
(United States) C Dolehide (China) S Zhang	3	1
3	(United States) D Krawczyk (Netherlands) D Schuurs	6	6
(Kazakhstan) A Danilina (China) Y Xu	2	4
PR	(Canada) G Dabrowski (Australia) D Saville	2	6	[6]
4	(Ukraine) L Kichenok (Latvia) J Ostapenko	6	4	[10]
(Brazil) L Stefani (China) Z Yang	3	6^{4}
2	(United States) N Melichar-Martinez (Australia) E Perez	6	7^{7}

Semifinals
1	(United States) C Gauff (United States) J Pegula
3	(United States) D Krawczyk (Netherlands) D Schuurs	w/o
4	(Ukraine) L Kichenok (Latvia) J Ostapenko
2	(United States) N Melichar-Martinez (Australia) E Perez	w/o

Final
3	(United States) D Krawczyk (Netherlands) D Schuurs	6	6
2	(United States) N Melichar-Martinez (Australia) E Perez	2	4
