= 2023 Toray Pan Pacific Open – Singles =

Singles
- 2023 Toray Pan Pacific Open

Final
- Champion: Veronika Kudermetova
- Runner-up: (United States) Jessica Pegula
- Score: 7–5, 6–1

Details
- Draw: 28
- Seeds: 8

Events
| Singles | Doubles |
| ← 2022 · | Pan Pacific Open | · 2024 → |

Veronika Kudermetova defeated Jessica Pegula in the final, 7–5, 6–1 to win the singles tennis title at the 2023 Toray Pan Pacific Open.

Liudmila Samsonova was the defending champion, but lost in the second round to Ekaterina Alexandrova.

This was the final professional appearance of former world No. 30 Misaki Doi. She lost to Maria Sakkari in the second round.

== Seeds ==
The top two seeds received a bye into the second round. Two Guadalajara semifinalists – Maria Sakkari and Caroline Garcia – also received a bye into the second round.

1. (Poland) Iga Świątek (quarterfinals)
2. (United States) Jessica Pegula (final)
3. (Kazakhstan) Elena Rybakina (withdrew)
4. (Greece) Maria Sakkari (semifinals)
5. (France) Caroline Garcia (quarterfinals)
6. Daria Kasatkina (quarterfinals)
7. Liudmila Samsonova (second round)
8. Veronika Kudermetova (champion)

== Draw ==
=== Key ===
- Q = Qualifier
- WC = Wild card
- LL = Lucky loser
- Alt = Alternate
- ITF = ITF entry
- PR = Protected ranking
- SR = Special ranking
- SE = Special exempt
- JE = Junior exempt
- JR = Junior Accelerator Programme entrant
- CO = College Accelerator Programme entrant
- NG = Next Gen Accelerator Program entrant
- w/o = Walkover
- r = Retired
- d = Defaulted

=== Finals ===
Semifinals
8 | Veronika Kudermetova | 7^{8} | 6^{2} | 6
Anastasia Pavlyuchenkova | 6^{6} | 7^{7} | 3
4 | (Greece) Maria Sakkari | 2 | 3
2 | (United States) Jessica Pegula | 6 | 6

Final
8 | Veronika Kudermetova | 7 | 6
2 | (United States) Jessica Pegula | 5 | 1

=== Top half ===
First round
Q | (Japan) M Hontama | 6 | 6
(Japan) N Hibino | 2 | 4
(United States) K Day | 6 | 6
WC | (Japan) M Uchijima | 2 | 2
Q | (United Kingdom) H Dart | 3 | 6^{4}
8 | V Kudermetova | 6 | 7^{7}
LL | (Japan) H Sakatsume | 2 | 5
(Czech Republic) L Nosková | 6 | 7
A Pavlyuchenkova | 6 | 6
(Croatia) D Vekić | 1 | 1
WC | A Kalinskaya | 7^{9} | 1 | 5
E Alexandrova | 6^{7} | 6 | 7
(Germany) T Maria | 0 | 2
7 | L Samsonova | 6 | 6

Second round
1 | (Poland) I Świątek | 6 | 7
Q | (Japan) M Hontama | 4 | 5
(United States) K Day | 3 | 3
8 | V Kudermetova | 6 | 6
(Czech Republic) L Nosková | 3 | 6 | 0
A Pavlyuchenkova | 6 | 4 | 6
E Alexandrova | 6 | 6
7 | L Samsonova | 4 | 2

Quarterfinals
1 | (Poland) I Świątek | 2 | 6 | 4
8 | V Kudermetova | 6 | 2 | 6
A Pavlyuchenkova | 6 | 7
E Alexandrova | 2 | 5

Semifinals
8 | V Kudermetova | 7^{8} | 6^{2} | 6
A Pavlyuchenkova | 6^{6} | 7^{7} | 3

=== Bottom half ===
First round
(United States) A Krueger | 3 | 1
(Ukraine) A Kalinina | 6 | 6
(Croatia) P Martić | 5 | 2
Q | (Japan) M Doi | 7 | 6
6 | D Kasatkina | 3 | 6 | 6
(Ukraine) M Kostyuk | 6 | 4 | 3
LL | (Japan) S Hosogi | 6^{3} | 5
Q | (Greece) D Papamichail | 7^{7} | 7
(Spain) C Bucșa | 6 | 6
Q | (Japan) R Saigo | 1 | 2

Second round
5 | (France) C Garcia | 6 | 6
(Ukraine) A Kalinina | 4 | 3
Q | (Japan) M Doi | 3 | 1
4 | (Greece) M Sakkari | 6 | 6
6 | D Kasatkina | 6 | 6
Q | (Greece) D Papamichail | 4 | 4
(Spain) C Bucșa | 1 | 2
2 | (United States) J Pegula | 6 | 6

Quarterfinals
5 | (France) C Garcia | 2 | 2
4 | (Greece) M Sakkari | 6 | 6
6 | D Kasatkina | 1 | 0
2 | (United States) J Pegula | 6 | 6

Semifinals
4 | (Greece) M Sakkari | 2 | 3
2 | (United States) J Pegula | 6 | 6

== Qualifying ==
=== Seeds ===
1. (United States) Ashlyn Krueger (moved to main draw)
2. (Japan) Mai Hontama (qualified)
3. (United Kingdom) Harriet Dart (qualified)
4. (Japan) Himeno Sakatsume (qualifying competition, lucky loser)
5. (Greece) Despina Papamichail (qualified)
6. (Japan) Sakura Hosogi (qualifying competition, lucky loser)
7. (Japan) Misaki Doi (qualified)
8. (Japan) Rina Saigo (qualified)
9. (Japan) Natsumi Kawaguchi (qualified, withdrew)
10. (Japan) Yuki Naito (first round)
11. (Australia) Ellen Perez (qualifying competition)
12. (Japan) Sara Saito (qualifying competition)

=== Qualifiers ===
1. (Japan) Misaki Doi
2. (Japan) Mai Hontama
3. (United Kingdom) Harriet Dart
4. ~~(Japan) Natsumi Kawaguchi~~
5. (Greece) Despina Papamichail
6. (Japan) Rina Saigo

=== Lucky losers ===
1. (Japan) Himeno Sakatsume
2. (Japan) Sakura Hosogi

=== Qualifying draw ===
==== First qualifier ====
| First round | | | | Qualifying competition |
| | | | | 1 | (United States) Ashlyn Krueger |
| | | | | 7 | (Japan) Misaki Doi | w/o |
| WC | (Japan) Rinko Matsuda | 3 | 0 | 7 | (Japan) Misaki Doi | w/o |
| 7 | (Japan) Misaki Doi | 6 | 6 |

==== Second qualifier ====
First round
2 | (Japan) Mai Hontama | 6 | 6
WC | (Japan) Saki Imamura | 3 | 3
(United States) Nicole Melichar-Martinez | 3 | 2
12 | (Japan) Sara Saito | 6 | 6

Qualifying competition
2 | (Japan) Mai Hontama | 6 | 6
12 | (Japan) Sara Saito | 2 | 2

==== Third qualifier ====
First round
3 | (United Kingdom) Harriet Dart | 4 | 6 | 6
WC | (Japan) Sayaka Ishii | 6 | 1 | 3
WC | (Georgia (country)) Oksana Kalashnikova | 2 | 6 | 7^{7}
10 | (Japan) Yuki Naito | 6 | 3 | 6^{4}

Qualifying competition
3 | (United Kingdom) Harriet Dart | 6 | 6
WC | (Georgia (country)) Oksana Kalashnikova | 0 | 4

==== Fourth qualifier ====
First round
4 | (Japan) Himeno Sakatsume | 6 | 6
(Japan) Nagi Hanatani | 2 | 0
WC | (Netherlands) Bibiane Schoofs | 4 | 3
9 | (Japan) Natsumi Kawaguchi | 6 | 6

Qualifying competition
4 | (Japan) Himeno Sakatsume | 6^{2} | 4
9 | (Japan) Natsumi Kawaguchi | 7^{7} | 6

==== Fifth qualifier ====
First round
5 | (Greece) Despina Papamichail | 6 | 6
WC | Lidziya Marozava | 1 | 1
(Japan) Ena Shibahara | 6 | 2 | 3
11 | (Australia) Ellen Perez | 3 | 6 | 6

Qualifying competition
5 | (Greece) Despina Papamichail | 6 | 6
11 | (Australia) Ellen Perez | 4 | 3

==== Sixth qualifier ====
First round
6 | (Japan) Sakura Hosogi | 6 | 7
WC | (Japan) Chihiro Muramatsu | 3 | 5
(Mexico) Giuliana Olmos | 6^{8} | 3
8 | (Japan) Rina Saigo | 7^{10} | 6

Qualifying competition
6 | (Japan) Sakura Hosogi | 1 | 3
8 | (Japan) Rina Saigo | 6 | 6
