= 2023 Eastbourne International – Women's singles =

Women's singles
- 2023 Eastbourne International

Final
- Champion: (United States) Madison Keys
- Runner-up: Daria Kasatkina
- Score: 6–2, 7–6^{(15–13)}

Details
- Draw: 32
- Seeds: 8

Events
Singles	men	women
Doubles	men	women
← 2022 ·	Eastbourne International	· 2024 →

Madison Keys defeated Daria Kasatkina in the final, 6–2, 7–6^{(15–13)} to win the women's singles tennis title at the 2023 Eastbourne International. Keys did not drop a set en route to the title, saving ten set points across three matches. It was her second Eastbourne International title.

Petra Kvitová was the reigning champion, but withdrew due to fatigue.

== Seeds ==
1. (Kazakhstan) Elena Rybakina (withdrew)
2. (France) Caroline Garcia (quarterfinals, retired)
3. (United States) Jessica Pegula (quarterfinals)
4. (Tunisia) Ons Jabeur (second round)
5. (United States) Coco Gauff (semifinals)
6. (Greece) Maria Sakkari (withdrew)
7. (Czech Republic) Petra Kvitová (withdrew)
8. (Brazil) Beatriz Haddad Maia (second round, retired)
9. Daria Kasatkina (final)
10. (Czech Republic) Barbora Krejčíková (withdrew)

== Draw ==
=== Key ===
- Q = Qualifier
- WC = Wild card
- LL = Lucky loser
- Alt = Alternate
- ITF = ITF entry
- PR = Protected ranking
- SR = Special ranking
- SE = Special exempt
- JE = Junior exempt
- JR = Junior Accelerator Programme entrant
- CO = College Accelerator Programme entrant
- NG = Next Gen Accelerator Program entrant
- w/o = Walkover
- r = Retired
- d = Defaulted

=== Finals ===
Semifinals
(United States) Madison Keys	6	6
5	(United States) Coco Gauff	3	3
(Italy) Camila Giorgi	2	5
9	Daria Kasatkina	6	7

Final
(United States) Madison Keys	6	7^{15}
9	Daria Kasatkina	2	6^{13}

=== Top half ===
First round
LL	(Canada) R Marino	4	2
Q	(China) Xiy Wang	6	6
(United States) M Keys	7^{7}	6
LL	(Czech Republic) T Martincová	6^{4}	4
LL	(Croatia) P Martić	6	7
WC	(United Kingdom) K Boulter	4	5
(Czech Republic) M Bouzková	6	3	6^{3}
8	(Brazil) B Haddad Maia	3	6	7^{7}
3	(United States) J Pegula	6	6
(China) Q Zheng	3	4
(United States) S Rogers	4	4
Q	(Colombia) C Osorio	6	6
LL	(United Kingdom) J Burrage	4	6	6
Q	(United States) L Davis	6	4	3
(United States) B Pera	3	2
5	(United States) C Gauff	6	6

Second round
Q	(China) Xiy Wang	2	6^{3}
(United States) M Keys	6	7^{7}
LL	(Croatia) P Martić	6	3
8	(Brazil) B Haddad Maia	4	2^{r}
3	(United States) J Pegula	6	1	6
Q	(Colombia) C Osorio	2	6	3
LL	(United Kingdom) J Burrage	1	1
5	(United States) C Gauff	6	6

Quarterfinals
(United States) M Keys	6	6
LL	(Croatia) P Martić	4	1
3	(United States) J Pegula	3	3
5	(United States) C Gauff	6	6

Semifinals
(United States) M Keys	6	6
5	(United States) C Gauff	3	3

=== Bottom half ===
First round
LL	(Czech Republic) B Strýcová	4	3
(Latvia) J Ostapenko	6	6
(China) S Zhang	5	7^{7}	1
WC	(United Kingdom) H Dart	7	6^{5}	6
(Italy) C Giorgi	6	6
LL	(United Kingdom) H Watson	3	4
Q	(Italy) J Paolini	3	2
4	(Tunisia) O Jabeur	6	6
9	D Kasatkina	6	6
(Ukraine) A Kalinina	3	1
(Czech Republic) Ka Plíšková	6^{3}	6	3
(Belgium) E Mertens	7^{7}	3	0^{r}
(Romania) S Cîrstea	3	6	3
Q	(Romania) A Bogdan	6	2	6
Q	(United States) M Brengle	1	5
2/WC	(France) C Garcia	6	7

Second round
(Latvia) J Ostapenko	6	6
WC	(United Kingdom) H Dart	3	4
(Italy) C Giorgi	6	6
4	(Tunisia) O Jabeur	3	2
9	D Kasatkina	3	6	6
(Czech Republic) Ka Plíšková	6	3	3
Q	(Romania) A Bogdan	3	4
2/WC	(France) C Garcia	6	6

Quarterfinals
(Latvia) J Ostapenko	6^{8}	0^{r}
(Italy) C Giorgi	7^{10}	0
9	D Kasatkina	6	2
2/WC	(France) C Garcia	2	1^{r}

Semifinals
(Italy) C Giorgi	2	5
9	D Kasatkina	6	7

== Qualifying ==
=== Seeds ===
1. (Croatia) Petra Martić (qualifying competition, lucky loser)
2. (Italy) Jasmine Paolini (qualified)
3. (Ukraine) Lesia Tsurenko (withdrew)
4. (United States) Lauren Davis (qualified)
5. (Kazakhstan) Yulia Putintseva (first round, retired)
6. (Czech Republic) Linda Fruhvirtová (qualifying competition, lucky loser, withdrew)
7. (Romania) Ana Bogdan (qualified)
8. (United States) Caty McNally (withdrew)
9. Kamilla Rakhimova (first round)
10. (Poland) Magdalena Fręch (first round)
11. (China) Wang Xiyu (qualified)
12. (Spain) Cristina Bucșa (first round)

=== Qualifiers ===
1. (Romania) Ana Bogdan
2. (Italy) Jasmine Paolini
3. (United States) Madison Brengle
4. (United States) Lauren Davis
5. (Colombia) Camila Osorio
6. (China) Wang Xiyu

=== Lucky losers ===
1. ~~(Czech Republic) Linda Fruhvirtová~~
2. (United Kingdom) Jodie Burrage
3. (Croatia) Petra Martić
4. (Czech Republic) Tereza Martincová
5. (United Kingdom) Heather Watson
6. (Czech Republic) Barbora Strýcová
7. (Canada) Rebecca Marino

=== Qualifying draw ===
==== First qualifier ====
First round
1	(Croatia) Petra Martić	6	3	7
(Canada) Rebecca Marino	4	6	5
(Hungary) Panna Udvardy	4	4
7	(Romania) Ana Bogdan	6	6

Qualifying competition
1	(Croatia) Petra Martić	7	4	4
7	(Romania) Ana Bogdan	5	6	6

==== Second qualifier ====
First round
2	(Italy) Jasmine Paolini	4	6	6
WC	(United Kingdom) Ranah Stoiber	6	2	4
WC	(United Kingdom) Jodie Burrage	6^{5}	7	7^{7}
9	Kamilla Rakhimova	7^{7}	5	6^{4}

Qualifying competition
2	(Italy) Jasmine Paolini	7	6
WC	(United Kingdom) Jodie Burrage	5	4

==== Third qualifier ====
First round
Alt	(United States) Caroline Dolehide	6^{2}	7	6^{3}
(United States) Madison Brengle	7^{7}	5	7^{7}
PR	(Czech Republic) Barbora Strýcová	6	6
Alt	Margarita Betova	2	1

Qualifying competition
(United States) Madison Brengle	6	6
PR	(Czech Republic) Barbora Strýcová	3	3

==== Fourth qualifier ====
First round
4	(United States) Lauren Davis	3	6	6
(France) Diane Parry	6	1	2
(Czech Republic) Tereza Martincová	6	4	7
10	(Poland) Magdalena Fręch	4	6	5

Qualifying competition
4	(United States) Lauren Davis	7^{7}	7^{9}
(Czech Republic) Tereza Martincová	6^{2}	6^{7}

==== Fifth qualifier ====
First round
5	(Kazakhstan) Yulia Putintseva	3	4^{r}
WC	(United Kingdom) Heather Watson	6	3
(Colombia) Camila Osorio	4	6	6
12	(Spain) Cristina Bucșa	6	4	2

Qualifying competition
WC	(United Kingdom) Heather Watson	6^{5}	2
(Colombia) Camila Osorio	7^{7}	6

==== Sixth qualifier ====
First round
6	(Czech Republic) Linda Fruhvirtová	6	6
WC	(United Kingdom) Ella McDonald	1	0
(Hungary) Dalma Gálfi	1	0^{r}
11	(China) Wang Xiyu	6	1

Qualifying competition
6	(Czech Republic) Linda Fruhvirtová	4	2
11	(China) Wang Xiyu	6	6
