= 2023 WTA Tour =

Women's tennis circuit

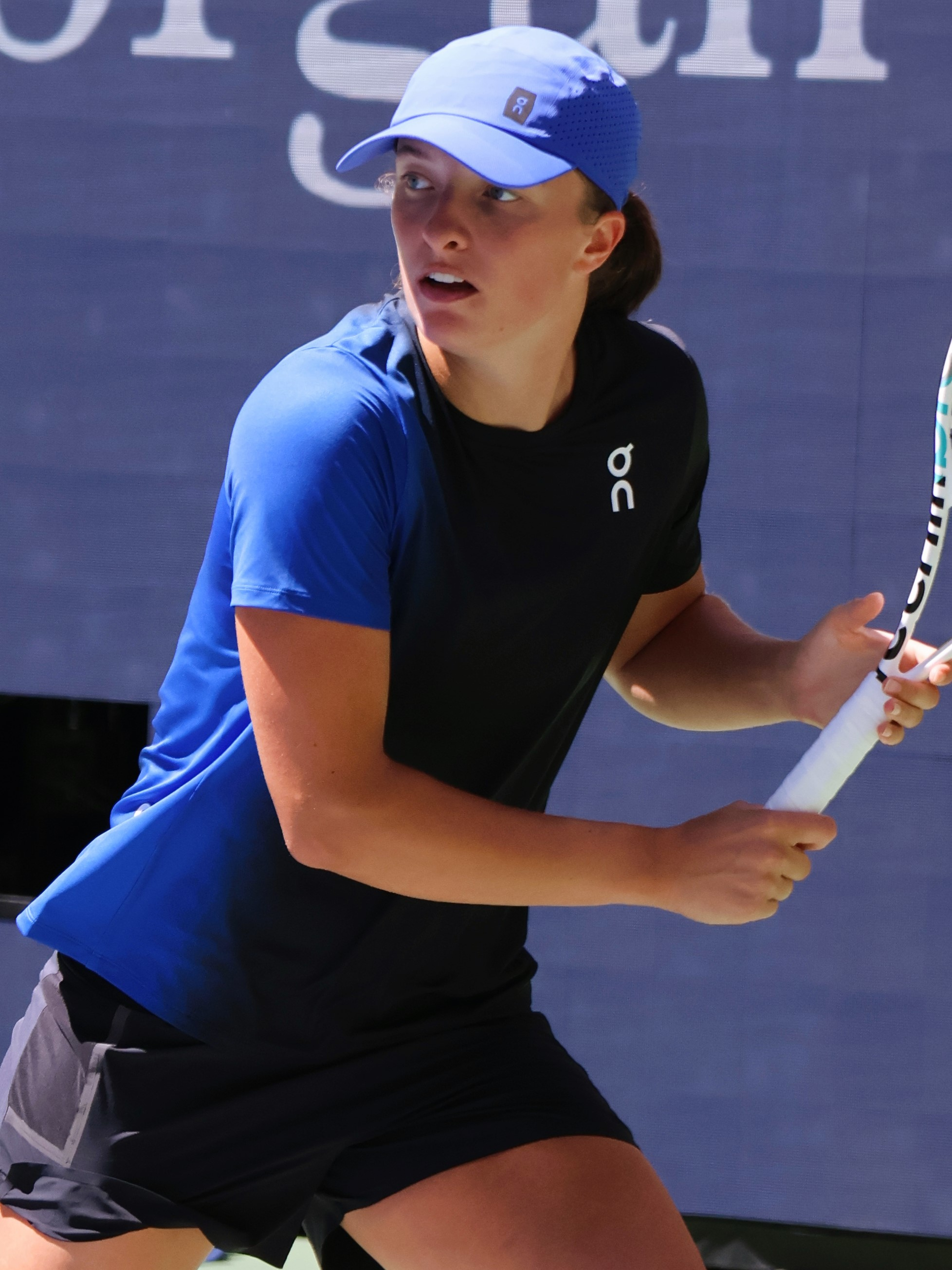
- Iga Świątek finished the year as world No. 1 for the second time in her career. She won six tournaments during the season, including a major at the French Open, as well as the WTA Finals. She also won a WTA 1000 event.

Details
- Duration: 29 December 2022 – 12 November 2023
- Edition: 53rd
- Tournaments: 58
- Categories: Grand Slam (4); WTA Finals; WTA Elite Trophy; WTA 1000 (9); WTA 500 (12); WTA 250 (30); Billie Jean King Cup; United Cup; Hopman Cup

Achievements (singles)
- Most titles: (Poland) Iga Świątek (6)
- Most finals: (Poland) Iga Świątek (8)
- Prize money leader: (Poland) Iga Świątek ($9,857,686)
- Points leader: (Poland) Iga Świątek (9,295)

Awards
- Player of the year: (Poland) Iga Świątek
- Doubles team of the year: (Australia) Storm Hunter (Belgium) Elise Mertens
- Most improved player of the year: (China) Zheng Qinwen
- Newcomer of the year: Mirra Andreeva
- Comeback player of the year: (Ukraine) Elina Svitolina

The 2023 WTA Tour (branded as the 2023 Hologic WTA Tour for sponsorship reasons) was the global elite women's professional tennis circuit organized by the Women's Tennis Association (WTA) for the 2023 tennis season. The 2023 WTA Tour calendar comprised the Grand Slam tournaments (supervised by the International Tennis Federation (ITF)), the WTA 1000 tournaments, the WTA 500 tournaments, the WTA 250 tournaments, the Billie Jean King Cup (organized by the ITF), the year-end championships (the 2023 WTA Finals and the WTA Elite Trophy), and the team events United Cup (combined event with ATP) and Hopman Cup (sanctioned by the ITF). 2023 also marked the return of the WTA to China, after strict COVID-19 protocols in the country and the disappearance of former tennis player Peng Shuai.

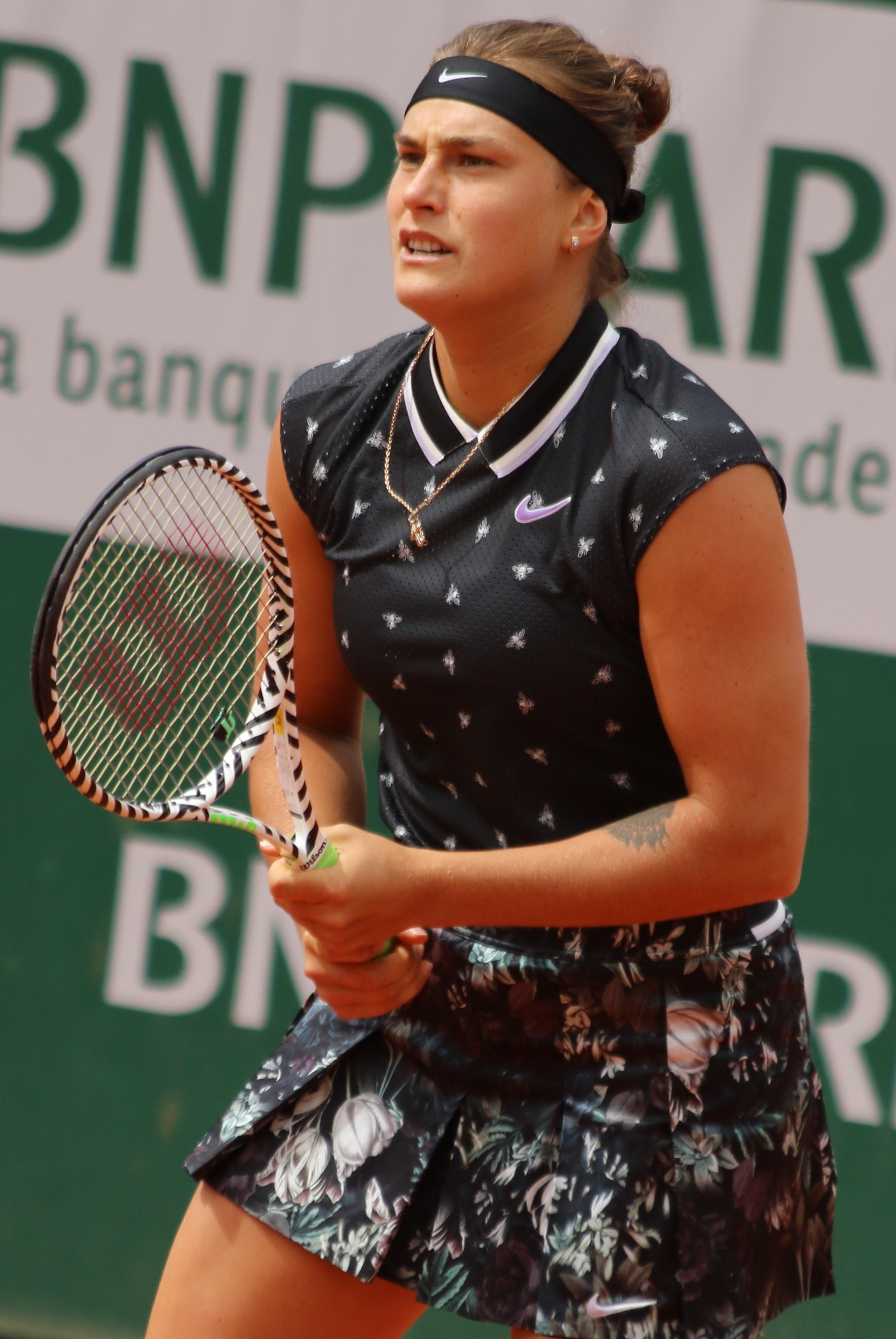
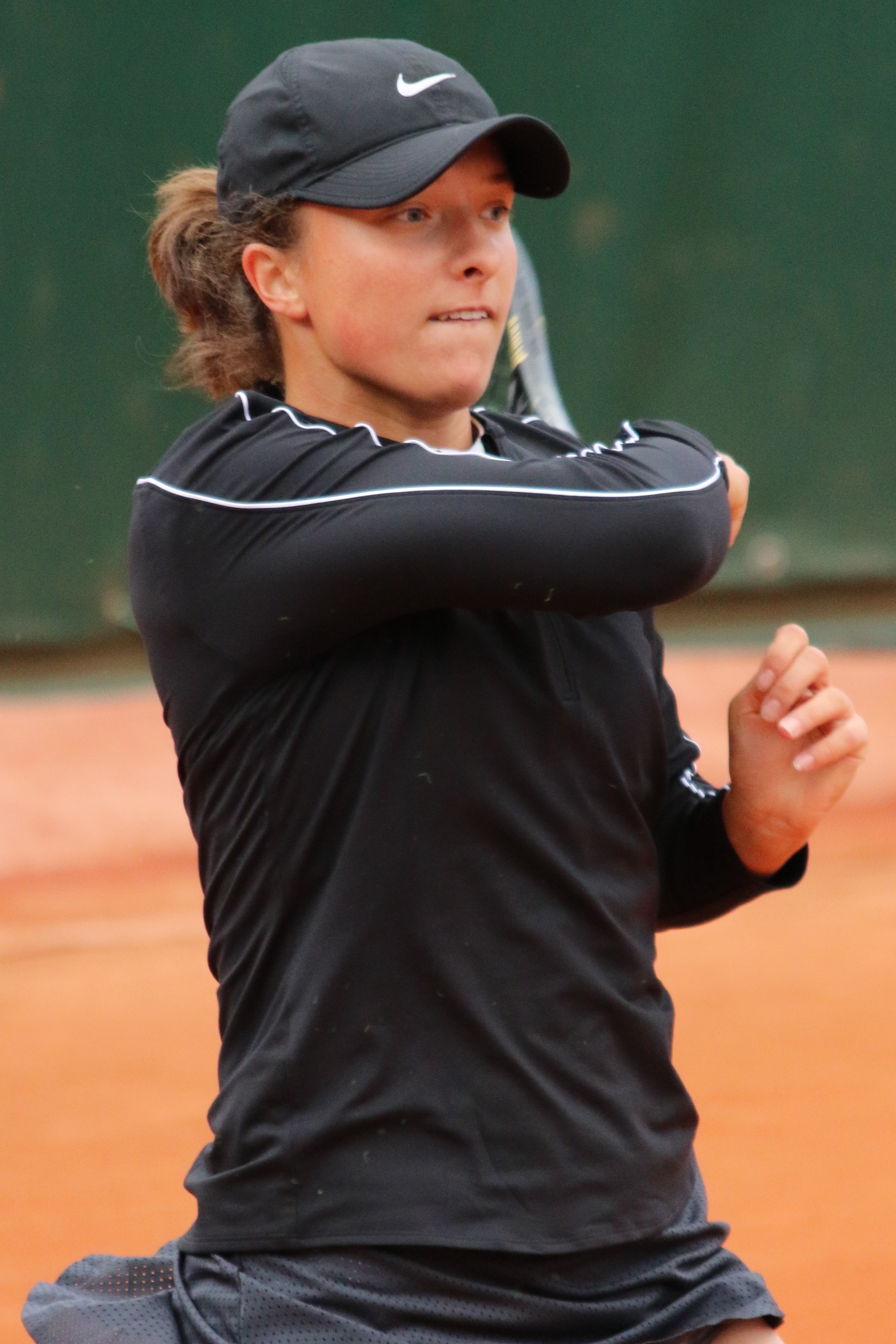
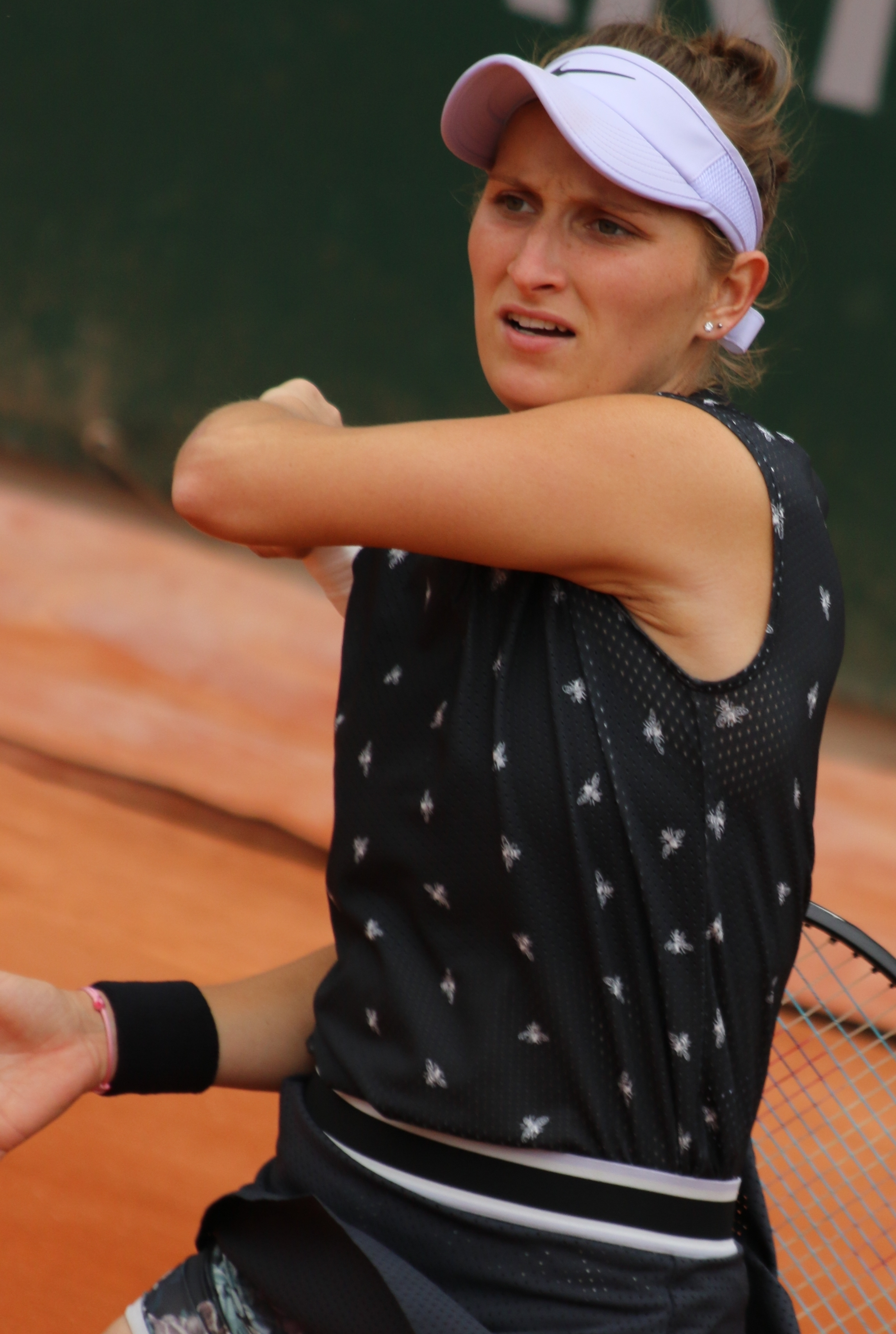
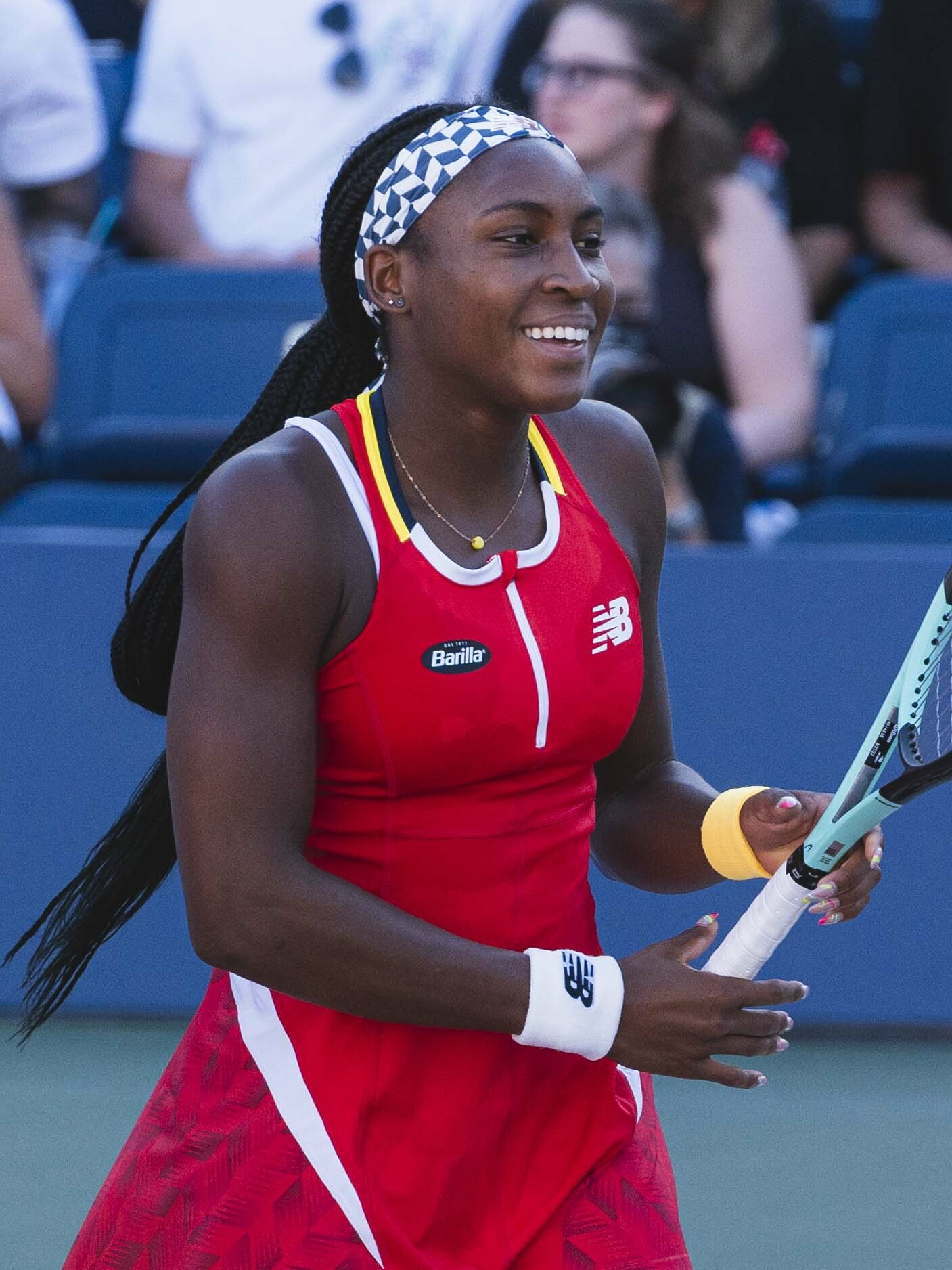
Aryna Sabalenka won the Australian Open, Iga Świątek won the French Open, Markéta Vondroušová was victorious at Wimbledon, and Coco Gauff won the US Open title.

== Schedule ==
This is the complete schedule of events on the 2023 calendar.

Key

Grand Slam tournaments
Year-end championships
WTA 1000 (Note: These points are still distributed by tournaments: 1000 points (WTA 1000; Mandatory); 900 points (WTA 1000; non-Mandatory); 470 points (WTA 500); 280 points (WTA 250))
WTA 500
WTA 250
Team events

=== January ===
Week	Tournament	Champions	Runners-up	Semifinalists	Quarterfinalists
2 Jan	United Cup; Brisbane/Perth/Sydney, Australia; Hard – $7,500,000 – 18 teams	(United States) United States; 4–0	Italy	Poland; Greece	
2 Jan	Adelaide International 1 Adelaide, Australia; WTA 500; Hard – $826,837 – 30S/24Q/24D; Singles – Doubles	Aryna Sabalenka; 6–3, 7–6^{(7–4)}	(Czech Republic) Linda Nosková	(Tunisia) Ons Jabeur (Romania) Irina-Camelia Begu	(Ukraine) Marta Kostyuk; Victoria Azarenka; Veronika Kudermetova (Czech Republic) Markéta Vondroušová
2 Jan	Adelaide International 1 Adelaide, Australia; WTA 500; Hard – $826,837 – 30S/24Q/24D; Singles – Doubles	(United States) Asia Muhammad (United States) Taylor Townsend; 6–2, 7–6^{(7–2)}	(Australia) Storm Hunter (Czech Republic) Kateřina Siniaková	(Tunisia) Ons Jabeur (Romania) Irina-Camelia Begu	(Ukraine) Marta Kostyuk; Victoria Azarenka; Veronika Kudermetova (Czech Republic) Markéta Vondroušová
2 Jan	Auckland Open; Auckland, New Zealand; WTA 250; Hard – $259,303 – 32S/24Q/16D; Singles – Doubles	(United States) Coco Gauff; 6–1, 6–1	(Spain) Rebeka Masarova	(Montenegro) Danka Kovinić (Belgium) Ysaline Bonaventure	(China) Zhu Lin (Slovakia) Viktória Kužmová (Canada) Leylah Fernandez (Czech Republic) Karolína Muchová
2 Jan	Auckland Open; Auckland, New Zealand; WTA 250; Hard – $259,303 – 32S/24Q/16D; Singles – Doubles	(Japan) Miyu Kato (Indonesia) Aldila Sutjiadi; 1–6, 7–5, [10–4]	(Canada) Leylah Fernandez (United States) Bethanie Mattek-Sands	(Montenegro) Danka Kovinić (Belgium) Ysaline Bonaventure	(China) Zhu Lin (Slovakia) Viktória Kužmová (Canada) Leylah Fernandez (Czech Republic) Karolína Muchová
9 Jan	Adelaide International 2 Adelaide, Australia; WTA 500; Hard – $780,637 – 30S/24Q/16D; Singles – Doubles	(Switzerland) Belinda Bencic; 6–0, 6–2	Daria Kasatkina	Veronika Kudermetova (Spain) Paula Badosa	(France) Caroline Garcia (United States) Danielle Collins (Brazil) Beatriz Haddad Maia (Czech Republic) Petra Kvitová
9 Jan	Adelaide International 2 Adelaide, Australia; WTA 500; Hard – $780,637 – 30S/24Q/16D; Singles – Doubles	(Brazil) Luisa Stefani (United States) Taylor Townsend; 7–5, 7–6^{(7–3)}	Anastasia Pavlyuchenkova (Kazakhstan) Elena Rybakina	Veronika Kudermetova (Spain) Paula Badosa	(France) Caroline Garcia (United States) Danielle Collins (Brazil) Beatriz Haddad Maia (Czech Republic) Petra Kvitová
9 Jan	Hobart International; Hobart, Australia; WTA 250; Hard – $259,303 – 32S/24Q/16D; Singles – Doubles	(United States) Lauren Davis; 7–6^{(7–0)}, 6–2	(Italy) Elisabetta Cocciaretto	Anna Blinkova (United States) Sofia Kenin	(Kazakhstan) Yulia Putintseva (China) Wang Xinyu (United States) Bernarda Pera (Ukraine) Anhelina Kalinina
9 Jan	Hobart International; Hobart, Australia; WTA 250; Hard – $259,303 – 32S/24Q/16D; Singles – Doubles	(Belgium) Kirsten Flipkens (Germany) Laura Siegemund; 6–4, 7–5	(Switzerland) Viktorija Golubic (Hungary) Panna Udvardy	Anna Blinkova (United States) Sofia Kenin	(Kazakhstan) Yulia Putintseva (China) Wang Xinyu (United States) Bernarda Pera (Ukraine) Anhelina Kalinina
16 Jan; 23 Jan	Australian Open; Melbourne, Australia; Grand Slam; Hard – A$ 128S/128Q/64D/32X; Singles – Doubles – Mixed	Aryna Sabalenka; 4–6, 6–3, 6–4	(Kazakhstan) Elena Rybakina	Victoria Azarenka (Poland) Magda Linette	(Latvia) Jeļena Ostapenko (United States) Jessica Pegula (Czech Republic) Karolína Plíšková (Croatia) Donna Vekić
16 Jan; 23 Jan	Australian Open; Melbourne, Australia; Grand Slam; Hard – A$ 128S/128Q/64D/32X; Singles – Doubles – Mixed	(Czech Republic) Barbora Krejčíková (Czech Republic) Kateřina Siniaková; 6–4, 6–3	(Japan) Shuko Aoyama (Japan) Ena Shibahara	Victoria Azarenka (Poland) Magda Linette	(Latvia) Jeļena Ostapenko (United States) Jessica Pegula (Czech Republic) Karolína Plíšková (Croatia) Donna Vekić
16 Jan; 23 Jan	Australian Open; Melbourne, Australia; Grand Slam; Hard – A$ 128S/128Q/64D/32X; Singles – Doubles – Mixed	(Brazil) Luisa Stefani (Brazil) Rafael Matos; 7–6^{(7–2)}, 6–2	(India) Sania Mirza (India) Rohan Bopanna	Victoria Azarenka (Poland) Magda Linette	(Latvia) Jeļena Ostapenko (United States) Jessica Pegula (Czech Republic) Karolína Plíšková (Croatia) Donna Vekić
30 Jan	Thailand Open; Hua Hin, Thailand; WTA 250; Hard – $259,303 – 32S/24Q/16D; Singles – Doubles	(China) Zhu Lin; 6–4, 6–4	(Ukraine) Lesia Tsurenko	(Canada) Bianca Andreescu (China) Wang Xinyu	(Ukraine) Marta Kostyuk (Germany) Tatjana Maria (Slovenia) Tamara Zidanšek (United Kingdom) Heather Watson
30 Jan	Thailand Open; Hua Hin, Thailand; WTA 250; Hard – $259,303 – 32S/24Q/16D; Singles – Doubles	(Chinese Taipei) Chan Hao-ching (Chinese Taipei) Wu Fang-hsien; 6–1, 7–6^{(8–6)}	(China) Wang Xinyu (China) Zhu Lin	(Canada) Bianca Andreescu (China) Wang Xinyu	(Ukraine) Marta Kostyuk (Germany) Tatjana Maria (Slovenia) Tamara Zidanšek (United Kingdom) Heather Watson
30 Jan	Lyon Open; Lyon, France; WTA 250; Hard (i) – $259,303 – 32S/24Q/16D; Singles – Doubles	(United States) Alycia Parks; 7–6^{(9–7)}, 7–5	(France) Caroline Garcia	(Colombia) Camila Osorio (Belgium) Maryna Zanevska	(Italy) Jasmine Paolini (Czech Republic) Linda Nosková (Montenegro) Danka Kovinić; Anastasia Potapova
30 Jan	Lyon Open; Lyon, France; WTA 250; Hard (i) – $259,303 – 32S/24Q/16D; Singles – Doubles	(Spain) Cristina Bucșa (Netherlands) Bibiane Schoofs; 7–6^{(7–5)}, 6–3	(Serbia) Olga Danilović; Alexandra Panova	(Colombia) Camila Osorio (Belgium) Maryna Zanevska	(Italy) Jasmine Paolini (Czech Republic) Linda Nosková (Montenegro) Danka Kovinić; Anastasia Potapova

=== February ===
Week	Tournament	Champions	Runners-up	Semifinalists	Quarterfinalists
6 Feb	Abu Dhabi Open; Abu Dhabi, United Arab Emirates; WTA 500; Hard – $780,637 – 28S/24Q/16D; Singles – Doubles	(Switzerland) Belinda Bencic; 1–6, 7–6^{(10–8)}, 6–4	Liudmila Samsonova	(China) Zheng Qinwen (Brazil) Beatriz Haddad Maia	Daria Kasatkina; Veronika Kudermetova (Kazakhstan) Elena Rybakina (United States) Shelby Rogers
6 Feb	Abu Dhabi Open; Abu Dhabi, United Arab Emirates; WTA 500; Hard – $780,637 – 28S/24Q/16D; Singles – Doubles	(Brazil) Luisa Stefani (China) Zhang Shuai; 3–6, 6–2, [10–8]	(Japan) Shuko Aoyama (Chinese Taipei) Chan Hao-ching	(China) Zheng Qinwen (Brazil) Beatriz Haddad Maia	Daria Kasatkina; Veronika Kudermetova (Kazakhstan) Elena Rybakina (United States) Shelby Rogers
6 Feb	Linz Open; Linz, Austria; WTA 250; Hard (i) – $259,303 – 32S/24Q/16D; Singles – Doubles	Anastasia Potapova; 6–3, 6–1	(Croatia) Petra Martić	(Greece) Maria Sakkari (Czech Republic) Markéta Vondroušová	(Croatia) Donna Vekić (Denmark) Clara Tauson (Germany) Anna-Lena Friedsam (Hungary) Dalma Gálfi
6 Feb	Linz Open; Linz, Austria; WTA 250; Hard (i) – $259,303 – 32S/24Q/16D; Singles – Doubles	(Georgia (country)) Natela Dzalamidze (Slovakia) Viktória Kužmová; 4–6, 7–5, [12–10]	(Germany) Anna-Lena Friedsam (Ukraine) Nadiia Kichenok	(Greece) Maria Sakkari (Czech Republic) Markéta Vondroušová	(Croatia) Donna Vekić (Denmark) Clara Tauson (Germany) Anna-Lena Friedsam (Hungary) Dalma Gálfi
13 Feb	Qatar Open; Doha, Qatar; WTA 500; Hard – $780,637 – 28S/32Q/16D; Singles – Doubles	(Poland) Iga Świątek; 6–3, 6–0	(United States) Jessica Pegula	Veronika Kudermetova (Greece) Maria Sakkari	(Switzerland) Belinda Bencic (United States) Coco Gauff (France) Caroline Garcia (Brazil) Beatriz Haddad Maia
13 Feb	Qatar Open; Doha, Qatar; WTA 500; Hard – $780,637 – 28S/32Q/16D; Singles – Doubles	(United States) Coco Gauff (United States) Jessica Pegula; 6–4, 2–6, [10–7]	(Ukraine) Lyudmyla Kichenok (Latvia) Jeļena Ostapenko	Veronika Kudermetova (Greece) Maria Sakkari	(Switzerland) Belinda Bencic (United States) Coco Gauff (France) Caroline Garcia (Brazil) Beatriz Haddad Maia
20 Feb	Dubai Tennis Championships; Dubai, United Arab Emirates; WTA 1000 (non-Mandatory); Hard – $2,788,468 – 56S/32Q/28D; Singles – Doubles	(Czech Republic) Barbora Krejčíková; 6–4, 6–2	(Poland) Iga Świątek	(United States) Coco Gauff (United States) Jessica Pegula	(Czech Republic) Karolína Plíšková (United States) Madison Keys (Czech Republic) Karolína Muchová; Aryna Sabalenka
20 Feb	Dubai Tennis Championships; Dubai, United Arab Emirates; WTA 1000 (non-Mandatory); Hard – $2,788,468 – 56S/32Q/28D; Singles – Doubles	Veronika Kudermetova; Liudmila Samsonova; 6–4, 6–7^{(4–7)}, [10–1]	(Chinese Taipei) Chan Hao-ching (Chinese Taipei) Latisha Chan	(United States) Coco Gauff (United States) Jessica Pegula	(Czech Republic) Karolína Plíšková (United States) Madison Keys (Czech Republic) Karolína Muchová; Aryna Sabalenka
20 Feb	Mérida Open; Mérida, Mexico; WTA 250; Hard – $259,303 – 32S/24Q/16D; Singles – Doubles	(Italy) Camila Giorgi; 7–6^{(7–3)}, 1–6, 6–2	(Sweden) Rebecca Peterson	(United States) Caty McNally (Czech Republic) Kateřina Siniaková	(Poland) Magda Linette (Australia) Kimberly Birrell (Italy) Elisabetta Cocciaretto (United States) Sloane Stephens
20 Feb	Mérida Open; Mérida, Mexico; WTA 250; Hard – $259,303 – 32S/24Q/16D; Singles – Doubles	(United States) Caty McNally (France) Diane Parry; 6–0, 7–5	(China) Wang Xinyu (Chinese Taipei) Wu Fang-hsien	(United States) Caty McNally (Czech Republic) Kateřina Siniaková	(Poland) Magda Linette (Australia) Kimberly Birrell (Italy) Elisabetta Cocciaretto (United States) Sloane Stephens
27 Feb	Monterrey Open; Monterrey, Mexico; WTA 250; Hard – $259,303 – 32S/24Q/16D; Singles – Doubles	(Croatia) Donna Vekić; 6–4, 3–6, 7–5	(France) Caroline Garcia	(Belgium) Elise Mertens (China) Zhu Lin	(Egypt) Mayar Sherif (Italy) Elisabetta Cocciaretto (Belgium) Ysaline Bonaventure (United States) Caroline Dolehide
27 Feb	Monterrey Open; Monterrey, Mexico; WTA 250; Hard – $259,303 – 32S/24Q/16D; Singles – Doubles	(Colombia) Yuliana Lizarazo (Colombia) María Paulina Pérez; 6–3, 5–7, [10–5]	(Australia) Kimberly Birrell (Mexico) Fernanda Contreras Gómez	(Belgium) Elise Mertens (China) Zhu Lin	(Egypt) Mayar Sherif (Italy) Elisabetta Cocciaretto (Belgium) Ysaline Bonaventure (United States) Caroline Dolehide
27 Feb	ATX Open; Austin, United States; WTA 250; Hard – $259,303 – 32S/24Q/16D; Singles – Doubles	(Ukraine) Marta Kostyuk; 6–3, 7–5	Varvara Gracheva	(United States) Katie Volynets (United States) Danielle Collins	(United States) Sloane Stephens (United States) Peyton Stearns; Anna Kalinskaya (Germany) Anna-Lena Friedsam
27 Feb	ATX Open; Austin, United States; WTA 250; Hard – $259,303 – 32S/24Q/16D; Singles – Doubles	(New Zealand) Erin Routliffe (Indonesia) Aldila Sutjiadi; 6–4, 3–6, [10–8]	(United States) Nicole Melichar-Martinez (Australia) Ellen Perez	(United States) Katie Volynets (United States) Danielle Collins	(United States) Sloane Stephens (United States) Peyton Stearns; Anna Kalinskaya (Germany) Anna-Lena Friedsam

=== March ===
Week	Tournament	Champions	Runners-up	Semifinalists	Quarterfinalists
6 Mar; 13 Mar	Indian Wells Open; Indian Wells, United States; WTA 1000 (Mandatory); Hard – $8,800,000 – 96S/48Q/32D; Singles – Doubles	(Kazakhstan) Elena Rybakina; 7–6^{(13–11)}, 6–4	Aryna Sabalenka	(Poland) Iga Świątek (Greece) Maria Sakkari	(Romania) Sorana Cîrstea (Czech Republic) Karolína Muchová (Czech Republic) Petra Kvitová (United States) Coco Gauff
6 Mar; 13 Mar	Indian Wells Open; Indian Wells, United States; WTA 1000 (Mandatory); Hard – $8,800,000 – 96S/48Q/32D; Singles – Doubles	(Czech Republic) Barbora Krejčíková (Czech Republic) Kateřina Siniaková; 6–1, 6–7^{(3–7)}, [10–7]	(Brazil) Beatriz Haddad Maia (Germany) Laura Siegemund	(Poland) Iga Świątek (Greece) Maria Sakkari	(Romania) Sorana Cîrstea (Czech Republic) Karolína Muchová (Czech Republic) Petra Kvitová (United States) Coco Gauff
20 Mar; 27 Mar	Miami Open; Miami Gardens, United States; WTA 1000 (Mandatory); Hard – $8,800,000 – 96S/48Q/32D; Singles – Doubles	(Czech Republic) Petra Kvitová; 7–6^{(16–14)}, 6–2	(Kazakhstan) Elena Rybakina	(United States) Jessica Pegula (Romania) Sorana Cîrstea	(Italy) Martina Trevisan; Anastasia Potapova; Ekaterina Alexandrova; Aryna Sabalenka
20 Mar; 27 Mar	Miami Open; Miami Gardens, United States; WTA 1000 (Mandatory); Hard – $8,800,000 – 96S/48Q/32D; Singles – Doubles	(United States) Coco Gauff (United States) Jessica Pegula; 7–6^{(8–6)}, 6–2	(Canada) Leylah Fernandez (United States) Taylor Townsend	(United States) Jessica Pegula (Romania) Sorana Cîrstea	(Italy) Martina Trevisan; Anastasia Potapova; Ekaterina Alexandrova; Aryna Sabalenka

=== April ===
Week	Tournament	Champions	Runners-up	Semifinalists	Quarterfinalists
3 Apr	Charleston Open; Charleston, United States; WTA 500; Clay (Green) – $780,637 – 56S/32Q/16D; Singles – Doubles	(Tunisia) Ons Jabeur; 7–6^{(8–6)}, 6–4	(Switzerland) Belinda Bencic	(United States) Jessica Pegula; Daria Kasatkina	(Spain) Paula Badosa; Ekaterina Alexandrova (United States) Madison Keys; Anna Kalinskaya
3 Apr	Charleston Open; Charleston, United States; WTA 500; Clay (Green) – $780,637 – 56S/32Q/16D; Singles – Doubles	(United States) Danielle Collins (United States) Desirae Krawczyk; 0–6, 6–4, [14–12]	(Mexico) Giuliana Olmos (Japan) Ena Shibahara	(United States) Jessica Pegula; Daria Kasatkina	(Spain) Paula Badosa; Ekaterina Alexandrova (United States) Madison Keys; Anna Kalinskaya
3 Apr	Copa Colsanitas; Bogotá, Colombia; WTA 250; Clay – $259,303 – 32S/24Q/16D; Singles – Doubles	(Germany) Tatjana Maria; 6–3, 2–6, 6–4	(United States) Peyton Stearns	Kamilla Rakhimova (United Kingdom) Francesca Jones	(Slovenia) Tamara Zidanšek (Spain) Sara Sorribes Tormo (Brazil) Laura Pigossi (Italy) Nuria Brancaccio
3 Apr	Copa Colsanitas; Bogotá, Colombia; WTA 250; Clay – $259,303 – 32S/24Q/16D; Singles – Doubles	Irina Khromacheva; Iryna Shymanovich; 6–1, 3–6, [10–6]	(Georgia (country)) Oksana Kalashnikova (Poland) Katarzyna Piter	Kamilla Rakhimova (United Kingdom) Francesca Jones	(Slovenia) Tamara Zidanšek (Spain) Sara Sorribes Tormo (Brazil) Laura Pigossi (Italy) Nuria Brancaccio
10 Apr	Billie Jean King Cup qualifying round Marbella, Spain – clay Antalya, Turkey – clay Coventry, United Kingdom – hard (i); Vancouver, Canada – hard (i); Delray Beach, United States – hard Bratislava, Slovakia – hard (i); Stuttgart, Germany – clay (i); Astana, Kazakhstan – clay (i); Koper, Slovenia – clay	Qualifying-round winners Spain, 3–1; Czech Republic, 3–1; France, 3–1; Canada, 3–2; United States, 4–0; Italy, 3–2; Germany, 3–1; Kazakhstan, 3–1; Slovenia, 3–2	Qualifying-round losers Mexico; Ukraine; Great Britain; Belgium; Austria; Slovakia; Brazil; Poland; Romania		
17 Apr	Stuttgart Open; Stuttgart, Germany; WTA 500; Clay (red) (i) – $780,637 – 28S/16Q/16D; Singles – Doubles	(Poland) Iga Świątek; 6–3, 6–4	Aryna Sabalenka	(Tunisia) Ons Jabeur; Anastasia Potapova	(Czech Republic) Karolína Plíšková (Brazil) Beatriz Haddad Maia (France) Caroline Garcia (Spain) Paula Badosa
17 Apr	Stuttgart Open; Stuttgart, Germany; WTA 500; Clay (red) (i) – $780,637 – 28S/16Q/16D; Singles – Doubles	(United States) Desirae Krawczyk (Netherlands) Demi Schuurs; 6–4, 6–1	(United States) Nicole Melichar-Martinez (Mexico) Giuliana Olmos	(Tunisia) Ons Jabeur; Anastasia Potapova	(Czech Republic) Karolína Plíšková (Brazil) Beatriz Haddad Maia (France) Caroline Garcia (Spain) Paula Badosa
24 Apr; 1 May	Madrid Open; Madrid, Spain; WTA 1000 (Mandatory); Clay (red) – €7,705,780 – 96S/48Q/32D; Singles – Doubles	Aryna Sabalenka; 6–3, 3–6, 6–3	(Poland) Iga Świątek	Veronika Kudermetova (Greece) Maria Sakkari	(Croatia) Petra Martić (United States) Jessica Pegula (Romania) Irina-Camelia Begu (Egypt) Mayar Sherif
24 Apr; 1 May	Madrid Open; Madrid, Spain; WTA 1000 (Mandatory); Clay (red) – €7,705,780 – 96S/48Q/32D; Singles – Doubles	Victoria Azarenka (Brazil) Beatriz Haddad Maia; 6–1, 6–4	(United States) Coco Gauff (United States) Jessica Pegula	Veronika Kudermetova (Greece) Maria Sakkari	(Croatia) Petra Martić (United States) Jessica Pegula (Romania) Irina-Camelia Begu (Egypt) Mayar Sherif

=== May ===
Week	Tournament	Champions	Runners-up	Semifinalists	Quarterfinalists
8 May; 15 May	Italian Open; Rome, Italy; WTA 1000 (non-Mandatory); Clay (red) – $3,572,618 –96S/48Q/32D; Singles – Doubles	(Kazakhstan) Elena Rybakina; 6–4, 1–0, ret.	(Ukraine) Anhelina Kalinina	(Latvia) Jeļena Ostapenko; Veronika Kudermetova	(Poland) Iga Świątek (Spain) Paula Badosa (China) Zheng Qinwen (Brazil) Beatriz Haddad Maia
8 May; 15 May	Italian Open; Rome, Italy; WTA 1000 (non-Mandatory); Clay (red) – $3,572,618 –96S/48Q/32D; Singles – Doubles	(Australia) Storm Hunter (Belgium) Elise Mertens; 6–4, 6–4	(United States) Coco Gauff (United States) Jessica Pegula	(Latvia) Jeļena Ostapenko; Veronika Kudermetova	(Poland) Iga Świątek (Spain) Paula Badosa (China) Zheng Qinwen (Brazil) Beatriz Haddad Maia
22 May	Internationaux de Strasbourg; Strasbourg, France; WTA 250; Clay (red) – $259,303 – 32S/16Q/16D; Singles – Doubles	(Ukraine) Elina Svitolina; 6–2, 6–3	Anna Blinkova	(United States) Lauren Davis (France) Clara Burel	Anastasia Pavlyuchenkova (United States) Emma Navarro (United States) Bernarda Pera; Varvara Gracheva
22 May	Internationaux de Strasbourg; Strasbourg, France; WTA 250; Clay (red) – $259,303 – 32S/16Q/16D; Singles – Doubles	(China) Xu Yifan (China) Yang Zhaoxuan; 6–3, 6–2	(United States) Desirae Krawczyk (Mexico) Giuliana Olmos	(United States) Lauren Davis (France) Clara Burel	Anastasia Pavlyuchenkova (United States) Emma Navarro (United States) Bernarda Pera; Varvara Gracheva
22 May	Morocco Open; Rabat, Morocco; WTA 250; Clay (red) – $259,303 – 32S/16Q/16D; Singles – Doubles	(Italy) Lucia Bronzetti; 6–4, 5–7, 7–5	(Austria) Julia Grabher	(Argentina) Julia Riera (United States) Sloane Stephens	(Italy) Martina Trevisan (Kazakhstan) Yulia Putintseva (United States) Alycia Parks (United States) Peyton Stearns
22 May	Morocco Open; Rabat, Morocco; WTA 250; Clay (red) – $259,303 – 32S/16Q/16D; Singles – Doubles	(United States) Sabrina Santamaria; Yana Sizikova; 3–6, 6–1, [10–8]	(Brazil) Ingrid Gamarra Martins; Lidziya Marozava	(Argentina) Julia Riera (United States) Sloane Stephens	(Italy) Martina Trevisan (Kazakhstan) Yulia Putintseva (United States) Alycia Parks (United States) Peyton Stearns
29 May; 5 Jun	French Open; Paris, France; Grand Slam; Clay (red) – $23,352,500; 128S/128Q/64D/32X; Singles – Doubles – Mixed	(Poland) Iga Świątek; 6–2, 5–7, 6–4	(Czech Republic) Karolína Muchová	(Brazil) Beatriz Haddad Maia; Aryna Sabalenka	(United States) Coco Gauff (Tunisia) Ons Jabeur; Anastasia Pavlyuchenkova (Ukraine) Elina Svitolina
29 May; 5 Jun	French Open; Paris, France; Grand Slam; Clay (red) – $23,352,500; 128S/128Q/64D/32X; Singles – Doubles – Mixed	(Chinese Taipei) Hsieh Su-wei (China) Wang Xinyu; 1–6, 7–6^{(7–5)}, 6–1	(Canada) Leylah Fernandez (United States) Taylor Townsend	(Brazil) Beatriz Haddad Maia; Aryna Sabalenka	(United States) Coco Gauff (Tunisia) Ons Jabeur; Anastasia Pavlyuchenkova (Ukraine) Elina Svitolina
29 May; 5 Jun	French Open; Paris, France; Grand Slam; Clay (red) – $23,352,500; 128S/128Q/64D/32X; Singles – Doubles – Mixed	(Japan) Miyu Kato (Germany) Tim Pütz; 4–6, 6–4, [10–6]	(Canada) Bianca Andreescu (New Zealand) Michael Venus	(Brazil) Beatriz Haddad Maia; Aryna Sabalenka	(United States) Coco Gauff (Tunisia) Ons Jabeur; Anastasia Pavlyuchenkova (Ukraine) Elina Svitolina

=== June ===
Week	Tournament	Champions	Runners-up	Semifinalists	Quarterfinalists
12 Jun	Rosmalen Open; Rosmalen, Netherlands; WTA 250; Grass – $259,303 – 32S/24Q/16D; Singles – Doubles	Ekaterina Alexandrova; 4–6, 6–4, 7–6^{(7–3)}	Veronika Kudermetova	(Slovakia) Viktória Hrunčáková; Aliaksandra Sasnovich	(Switzerland) Céline Naef (United States) Ashlyn Krueger (United States) Emina Bektas; Liudmila Samsonova
12 Jun	Rosmalen Open; Rosmalen, Netherlands; WTA 250; Grass – $259,303 – 32S/24Q/16D; Singles – Doubles	(Japan) Shuko Aoyama (Japan) Ena Shibahara; 6–3, 6–3	(Slovakia) Viktória Hrunčáková (Slovakia) Tereza Mihalíková	(Slovakia) Viktória Hrunčáková; Aliaksandra Sasnovich	(Switzerland) Céline Naef (United States) Ashlyn Krueger (United States) Emina Bektas; Liudmila Samsonova
12 Jun	Nottingham Open; Nottingham, United Kingdom; WTA 250; Grass – $259,303 – 32S/24Q/16D; Singles – Doubles	(United Kingdom) Katie Boulter; 6–3, 6–3	(United Kingdom) Jodie Burrage	(France) Alizé Cornet (United Kingdom) Heather Watson	(United States) Elizabeth Mandlik (Poland) Magdalena Fręch (Switzerland) Viktorija Golubic (United Kingdom) Harriet Dart
12 Jun	Nottingham Open; Nottingham, United Kingdom; WTA 250; Grass – $259,303 – 32S/24Q/16D; Singles – Doubles	(Norway) Ulrikke Eikeri (Estonia) Ingrid Neel; 7–6^{(8–6)}, 5–7, [10–8]	(United Kingdom) Harriet Dart (United Kingdom) Heather Watson	(France) Alizé Cornet (United Kingdom) Heather Watson	(United States) Elizabeth Mandlik (Poland) Magdalena Fręch (Switzerland) Viktorija Golubic (United Kingdom) Harriet Dart
19 Jun	German Open; Berlin, Germany; WTA 500; Grass – $780,637 – 32S/24Q/16D; Singles – Doubles	(Czech Republic) Petra Kvitová; 6–2, 7–6^{(8–6)}	(Croatia) Donna Vekić	Ekaterina Alexandrova (Greece) Maria Sakkari	Veronika Kudermetova (France) Caroline Garcia (Czech Republic) Markéta Vondroušová; Elina Avanesyan
19 Jun	German Open; Berlin, Germany; WTA 500; Grass – $780,637 – 32S/24Q/16D; Singles – Doubles	(France) Caroline Garcia (Brazil) Luisa Stefani; 4–6, 7–6^{(10–8)}, [10–4]	(Czech Republic) Kateřina Siniaková (Czech Republic) Markéta Vondroušová	Ekaterina Alexandrova (Greece) Maria Sakkari	Veronika Kudermetova (France) Caroline Garcia (Czech Republic) Markéta Vondroušová; Elina Avanesyan
19 Jun	Birmingham Classic; Birmingham, United Kingdom; WTA 250; Grass – $259,303 – 32S/24Q/16D; Singles – Doubles	(Latvia) Jeļena Ostapenko; 7–6^{(10–8)}, 6–4	(Czech Republic) Barbora Krejčíková	(China) Zhu Lin; Anastasia Potapova	(Czech Republic) Linda Fruhvirtová (Canada) Rebecca Marino (United Kingdom) Harriet Dart (Poland) Magdalena Fręch
19 Jun	Birmingham Classic; Birmingham, United Kingdom; WTA 250; Grass – $259,303 – 32S/24Q/16D; Singles – Doubles	(Ukraine) Marta Kostyuk (Czech Republic) Barbora Krejčíková; 6–2, 7–6^{(9–7)}	(Australia) Storm Hunter (United States) Alycia Parks	(China) Zhu Lin; Anastasia Potapova	(Czech Republic) Linda Fruhvirtová (Canada) Rebecca Marino (United Kingdom) Harriet Dart (Poland) Magdalena Fręch
26 Jun	Eastbourne International; Eastbourne, United Kingdom; WTA 500; Grass – $780,637 – 32S/24Q/16D; Singles – Doubles	(United States) Madison Keys; 6–2, 7–6^{(15–13)}	Daria Kasatkina	(United States) Coco Gauff (Italy) Camila Giorgi	(Croatia) Petra Martić (United States) Jessica Pegula (Latvia) Jeļena Ostapenko (France) Caroline Garcia
26 Jun	Eastbourne International; Eastbourne, United Kingdom; WTA 500; Grass – $780,637 – 32S/24Q/16D; Singles – Doubles	(United States) Desirae Krawczyk (Netherlands) Demi Schuurs; 6–2, 6–4	(United States) Nicole Melichar-Martinez (Australia) Ellen Perez	(United States) Coco Gauff (Italy) Camila Giorgi	(Croatia) Petra Martić (United States) Jessica Pegula (Latvia) Jeļena Ostapenko (France) Caroline Garcia
26 Jun	Bad Homburg Open; Bad Homburg, Germany; WTA 250; Grass – $259,303 – 32S/8Q/16D; Singles – Doubles	(Czech Republic) Kateřina Siniaková; 6–2, 7–6^{(7–5)}	(Italy) Lucia Bronzetti	(Poland) Iga Świątek (United States) Emma Navarro	Anna Blinkova (France) Varvara Gracheva (Spain) Rebeka Masarova; Liudmila Samsonova
26 Jun	Bad Homburg Open; Bad Homburg, Germany; WTA 250; Grass – $259,303 – 32S/8Q/16D; Singles – Doubles	(Brazil) Ingrid Gamarra Martins; Lidziya Marozava; 6–0, 7–6^{(7–3)}	(Japan) Eri Hozumi (Romania) Monica Niculescu	(Poland) Iga Świątek (United States) Emma Navarro	Anna Blinkova (France) Varvara Gracheva (Spain) Rebeka Masarova; Liudmila Samsonova

=== July ===
Week	Tournament	Champions	Runners-up	Semifinalists	Quarterfinalists
3 Jul; 10 Jul	Wimbledon; London, United Kingdom; Grand Slam; Grass – £44,700,000; 128S/128Q/64D/32X; Singles – Doubles – Mixed	(Czech Republic) Markéta Vondroušová; 6–4, 6–4	(Tunisia) Ons Jabeur	(Ukraine) Elina Svitolina; Aryna Sabalenka	(Poland) Iga Świątek (United States) Jessica Pegula (Kazakhstan) Elena Rybakina (United States) Madison Keys
3 Jul; 10 Jul	Wimbledon; London, United Kingdom; Grand Slam; Grass – £44,700,000; 128S/128Q/64D/32X; Singles – Doubles – Mixed	(Chinese Taipei) Hsieh Su-wei (Czech Republic) Barbora Strýcová; 7–5, 6–4	(Australia) Storm Hunter (Belgium) Elise Mertens	(Ukraine) Elina Svitolina; Aryna Sabalenka	(Poland) Iga Świątek (United States) Jessica Pegula (Kazakhstan) Elena Rybakina (United States) Madison Keys
3 Jul; 10 Jul	Wimbledon; London, United Kingdom; Grand Slam; Grass – £44,700,000; 128S/128Q/64D/32X; Singles – Doubles – Mixed	(Ukraine) Lyudmyla Kichenok (Croatia) Mate Pavić; 6–4, 6–7^{(9–11)}, 6–3	(China) Xu Yifan (Belgium) Joran Vliegen	(Ukraine) Elina Svitolina; Aryna Sabalenka	(Poland) Iga Świątek (United States) Jessica Pegula (Kazakhstan) Elena Rybakina (United States) Madison Keys
17 Jul	Hopman Cup; Nice, France; ITF Mixed Teams Championships; Clay (red) – 6 teams (RR)	Croatia; 2–0	Switzerland	Round Robin (Group 1) Denmark; France	Round Robin (Group 2) Belgium; Spain
17 Jul	Budapest Grand Prix; Budapest, Hungary; WTA 250; Clay (red) – $259,303 – 32S/24Q/16D; Singles – Doubles	Maria Timofeeva; 6–3, 3–6, 6–0	(Ukraine) Kateryna Baindl	(Argentina) Nadia Podoroska (United States) Claire Liu	(Slovenia) Kaja Juvan; Elina Avanesyan (Slovakia) Anna Karolína Schmiedlová (Hungary) Fanny Stollár
17 Jul	Budapest Grand Prix; Budapest, Hungary; WTA 250; Clay (red) – $259,303 – 32S/24Q/16D; Singles – Doubles	(Poland) Katarzyna Piter (Hungary) Fanny Stollár; 6–2, 4–6, [10–4]	(United States) Jessie Aney (Czech Republic) Anna Sisková	(Argentina) Nadia Podoroska (United States) Claire Liu	(Slovenia) Kaja Juvan; Elina Avanesyan (Slovakia) Anna Karolína Schmiedlová (Hungary) Fanny Stollár
17 Jul	Palermo International; Palermo, Italy; WTA 250; Clay (red) – $259,303 – 32S/24Q/15D; Singles – Doubles	(China) Zheng Qinwen; 6–4, 1–6, 6–1	(Italy) Jasmine Paolini	(Spain) Sara Sorribes Tormo (Egypt) Mayar Sherif	Daria Kasatkina (France) Clara Burel (Colombia) Camila Osorio (United States) Emma Navarro
17 Jul	Palermo International; Palermo, Italy; WTA 250; Clay (red) – $259,303 – 32S/24Q/15D; Singles – Doubles	Yana Sizikova (Belgium) Kimberley Zimmermann; 6–2, 6–4	(Italy) Angelica Moratelli (Italy) Camilla Rosatello	(Spain) Sara Sorribes Tormo (Egypt) Mayar Sherif	Daria Kasatkina (France) Clara Burel (Colombia) Camila Osorio (United States) Emma Navarro
24 Jul	Hamburg European Open; Hamburg, Germany; WTA 250; Clay (red) – $259,303 – 32S/24Q/16D; Singles – Doubles	(Netherlands) Arantxa Rus; 6–0, 7–6^{(7–3)}	(Germany) Noma Noha Akugue	Diana Shnaider (Australia) Daria Saville	(Italy) Martina Trevisan (United States) Bernarda Pera (Germany) Jule Niemeier (Germany) Eva Lys
24 Jul	Hamburg European Open; Hamburg, Germany; WTA 250; Clay (red) – $259,303 – 32S/24Q/16D; Singles – Doubles	(Kazakhstan) Anna Danilina; Alexandra Panova; 6–4, 6–2	(Czech Republic) Miriam Kolodziejová (United States) Angela Kulikov	Diana Shnaider (Australia) Daria Saville	(Italy) Martina Trevisan (United States) Bernarda Pera (Germany) Jule Niemeier (Germany) Eva Lys
24 Jul	Poland Open; Warsaw, Poland; WTA 250; Hard – $259,303 – 32S/16Q/16D; Singles – Doubles	(Poland) Iga Świątek; 6–0, 6–1	(Germany) Laura Siegemund	(Belgium) Yanina Wickmayer (Germany) Tatjana Maria	(Czech Republic) Linda Nosková (United Kingdom) Heather Watson (Italy) Lucrezia Stefanini (Slovakia) Rebecca Šramková
24 Jul	Poland Open; Warsaw, Poland; WTA 250; Hard – $259,303 – 32S/16Q/16D; Singles – Doubles	(United Kingdom) Heather Watson (Belgium) Yanina Wickmayer; 6–4, 6–4	(Poland) Weronika Falkowska (Poland) Katarzyna Piter	(Belgium) Yanina Wickmayer (Germany) Tatjana Maria	(Czech Republic) Linda Nosková (United Kingdom) Heather Watson (Italy) Lucrezia Stefanini (Slovakia) Rebecca Šramková
24 Jul	Swiss Open; Lausanne, Switzerland; WTA 250; Clay (red) – $259,303 – 32S/8Q/16D; Singles – Doubles	(Italy) Elisabetta Cocciaretto; 7–5, 4–6, 6–4	(France) Clara Burel	(France) Diane Parry (Hungary) Anna Bondár	(France) Alizé Cornet (Romania) Ana Bogdan (Slovenia) Tamara Zidanšek; Elina Avanesyan
24 Jul	Swiss Open; Lausanne, Switzerland; WTA 250; Clay (red) – $259,303 – 32S/8Q/16D; Singles – Doubles	(Hungary) Anna Bondár (France) Diane Parry; 6–2, 6–1	Amina Anshba (Czech Republic) Anastasia Dețiuc	(France) Diane Parry (Hungary) Anna Bondár	(France) Alizé Cornet (Romania) Ana Bogdan (Slovenia) Tamara Zidanšek; Elina Avanesyan
31 Jul	Washington Open; Washington, D.C., United States; WTA 500; Hard – $780,637 – 28S/16Q/16D; Singles – Doubles	(United States) Coco Gauff; 6–2, 6–3	(Greece) Maria Sakkari	(United States) Jessica Pegula; Liudmila Samsonova	(Ukraine) Elina Svitolina (United States) Madison Keys (Switzerland) Belinda Bencic (Ukraine) Marta Kostyuk
31 Jul	Washington Open; Washington, D.C., United States; WTA 500; Hard – $780,637 – 28S/16Q/16D; Singles – Doubles	(Germany) Laura Siegemund; Vera Zvonareva; 6–4, 6–4	(Chile) Alexa Guarachi (Romania) Monica Niculescu	(United States) Jessica Pegula; Liudmila Samsonova	(Ukraine) Elina Svitolina (United States) Madison Keys (Switzerland) Belinda Bencic (Ukraine) Marta Kostyuk
31 Jul	Prague Open; Prague, Czech Republic; WTA 250; Hard – $259,303 – 32S/24Q/16D; Singles – Doubles	(Japan) Nao Hibino; 6–4, 6–1	(Czech Republic) Linda Nosková	(Romania) Jaqueline Cristian (Germany) Tamara Korpatsch	(Ukraine) Kateryna Baindl (Czech Republic) Tereza Martincová (Slovakia) Anna Karolína Schmiedlová (France) Alizé Cornet
31 Jul	Prague Open; Prague, Czech Republic; WTA 250; Hard – $259,303 – 32S/24Q/16D; Singles – Doubles	(Japan) Nao Hibino (Georgia (country)) Oksana Kalashnikova; 6–7^{(7–9)}, 7–5, [10–3]	(United States) Quinn Gleason (France) Elixane Lechemia	(Romania) Jaqueline Cristian (Germany) Tamara Korpatsch	(Ukraine) Kateryna Baindl (Czech Republic) Tereza Martincová (Slovakia) Anna Karolína Schmiedlová (France) Alizé Cornet

=== August ===
Week	Tournament	Champions	Runners-up	Semifinalists	Quarterfinalists
7 Aug	Canadian Open; Montreal, Canada; WTA 1000 (non-Mandatory); Hard – $2,788,468 – 56S/32Q/28D; Singles – Doubles	(United States) Jessica Pegula; 6–1, 6–0	Liudmila Samsonova	(Poland) Iga Świątek (Kazakhstan) Elena Rybakina	(United States) Danielle Collins (United States) Coco Gauff; Daria Kasatkina (Switzerland) Belinda Bencic
7 Aug	Canadian Open; Montreal, Canada; WTA 1000 (non-Mandatory); Hard – $2,788,468 – 56S/32Q/28D; Singles – Doubles	(Japan) Shuko Aoyama (Japan) Ena Shibahara; 6–4, 4–6, [13–11]	(United States) Desirae Krawczyk (Netherlands) Demi Schuurs	(Poland) Iga Świątek (Kazakhstan) Elena Rybakina	(United States) Danielle Collins (United States) Coco Gauff; Daria Kasatkina (Switzerland) Belinda Bencic
14 Aug	Cincinnati Open; Mason, United States; WTA 1000 (non-Mandatory); Hard – $2,788,468 – 56S/31Q/28D; Singles – Doubles	(United States) Coco Gauff; 6–3, 6–4	(Czech Republic) Karolína Muchová	(Poland) Iga Świątek; Aryna Sabalenka	(Czech Republic) Markéta Vondroušová (Italy) Jasmine Paolini (Czech Republic) Marie Bouzková (Tunisia) Ons Jabeur
14 Aug	Cincinnati Open; Mason, United States; WTA 1000 (non-Mandatory); Hard – $2,788,468 – 56S/31Q/28D; Singles – Doubles	(United States) Alycia Parks (United States) Taylor Townsend; 6–7^{(1–7)}, 6–4, [10–6]	(United States) Nicole Melichar-Martinez (Australia) Ellen Perez	(Poland) Iga Świątek; Aryna Sabalenka	(Czech Republic) Markéta Vondroušová (Italy) Jasmine Paolini (Czech Republic) Marie Bouzková (Tunisia) Ons Jabeur
21 Aug	Tennis in the Land; Cleveland, United States; WTA 250; Hard – $271,363 – 32S/24Q/16D; Singles – Doubles	(Spain) Sara Sorribes Tormo; 3–6, 6–4, 6–4	Ekaterina Alexandrova	(China) Zhu Lin (Germany) Tatjana Maria	(France) Caroline Garcia (China) Wang Xinyu (United States) Sloane Stephens (Canada) Leylah Fernandez
21 Aug	Tennis in the Land; Cleveland, United States; WTA 250; Hard – $271,363 – 32S/24Q/16D; Singles – Doubles	(Japan) Miyu Kato (Indonesia) Aldila Sutjiadi; 6–4, 6–7^{(4–7)}, [10–8]	(United States) Nicole Melichar-Martinez (Australia) Ellen Perez	(China) Zhu Lin (Germany) Tatjana Maria	(France) Caroline Garcia (China) Wang Xinyu (United States) Sloane Stephens (Canada) Leylah Fernandez
28 Aug; 4 Sep	US Open; New York City, United States; Grand Slam; Hard – $29,488,400; 128S/128Q/64D/32X; Singles – Doubles – Mixed	(United States) Coco Gauff; 2–6, 6–3, 6–2	Aryna Sabalenka	(Czech Republic) Karolína Muchová (United States) Madison Keys	(Latvia) Jeļena Ostapenko (Romania) Sorana Cîrstea (Czech Republic) Markéta Vondroušová (China) Zheng Qinwen
28 Aug; 4 Sep	US Open; New York City, United States; Grand Slam; Hard – $29,488,400; 128S/128Q/64D/32X; Singles – Doubles – Mixed	(Canada) Gabriela Dabrowski (New Zealand) Erin Routliffe; 7–6^{(11–9)}, 6–3	(Germany) Laura Siegemund; Vera Zvonareva	(Czech Republic) Karolína Muchová (United States) Madison Keys	(Latvia) Jeļena Ostapenko (Romania) Sorana Cîrstea (Czech Republic) Markéta Vondroušová (China) Zheng Qinwen
28 Aug; 4 Sep	US Open; New York City, United States; Grand Slam; Hard – $29,488,400; 128S/128Q/64D/32X; Singles – Doubles – Mixed	(Kazakhstan) Anna Danilina (Finland) Harri Heliövaara; 6–3, 6–4	(United States) Jessica Pegula (United States) Austin Krajicek	(Czech Republic) Karolína Muchová (United States) Madison Keys	(Latvia) Jeļena Ostapenko (Romania) Sorana Cîrstea (Czech Republic) Markéta Vondroušová (China) Zheng Qinwen

=== September ===
Week	Tournament	Champions	Runners-up	Semifinalists	Quarterfinalists
11 Sep	Southern California Open; San Diego, United States; WTA 500; Hard – $780,637 – 28S/24Q/16D; Singles – Doubles	(Czech Republic) Barbora Krejčíková; 6–4, 2–6, 6–4	(United States) Sofia Kenin	(United States) Emma Navarro (United States) Danielle Collins	Anastasia Potapova (Greece) Maria Sakkari (Brazil) Beatriz Haddad Maia (France) Caroline Garcia
11 Sep	Southern California Open; San Diego, United States; WTA 500; Hard – $780,637 – 28S/24Q/16D; Singles – Doubles	(Czech Republic) Barbora Krejčíková (Czech Republic) Kateřina Siniaková; 6–1, 6–4	(United States) Danielle Collins (United States) CoCo Vandeweghe	(United States) Emma Navarro (United States) Danielle Collins	Anastasia Potapova (Greece) Maria Sakkari (Brazil) Beatriz Haddad Maia (France) Caroline Garcia
11 Sep	Japan Women's Open; Osaka, Japan; WTA 250; Hard – $259,303 – 32S/24Q/16D; Singles – Doubles	(United States) Ashlyn Krueger; 6–3, 7–6^{(8–6)}	(China) Zhu Lin	(China) Wang Xinyu (Japan) Mai Hontama	(United States) Elizabeth Mandlik (Kazakhstan) Yulia Putintseva; Anna Kalinskaya (Netherlands) Arianne Hartono
11 Sep	Japan Women's Open; Osaka, Japan; WTA 250; Hard – $259,303 – 32S/24Q/16D; Singles – Doubles	(Germany) Anna-Lena Friedsam (Ukraine) Nadiia Kichenok; 7–6^{(7–3)}, 6–3	Anna Kalinskaya (Kazakhstan) Yulia Putintseva	(China) Wang Xinyu (Japan) Mai Hontama	(United States) Elizabeth Mandlik (Kazakhstan) Yulia Putintseva; Anna Kalinskaya (Netherlands) Arianne Hartono
18 Sep	Guadalajara Open; Guadalajara, Mexico; WTA 1000 (Non-mandatory); Hard – $2,788,468 – 56S/32Q/28D; Singles – Doubles	(Greece) Maria Sakkari; 7–5, 6–3	(United States) Caroline Dolehide	(United States) Sofia Kenin (France) Caroline Garcia	(Italy) Martina Trevisan (Canada) Leylah Fernandez; Victoria Azarenka (Colombia) Emiliana Arango
18 Sep	Guadalajara Open; Guadalajara, Mexico; WTA 1000 (Non-mandatory); Hard – $2,788,468 – 56S/32Q/28D; Singles – Doubles	(Australia) Storm Hunter (Belgium) Elise Mertens; 3–6, 6–2, [10–4]	(Canada) Gabriela Dabrowski (New Zealand) Erin Routliffe	(United States) Sofia Kenin (France) Caroline Garcia	(Italy) Martina Trevisan (Canada) Leylah Fernandez; Victoria Azarenka (Colombia) Emiliana Arango
18 Sep	Guangzhou Open; Guangzhou, China; WTA 250; Hard – $259,303 – 32S/24Q/16D; Singles – Doubles	(China) Wang Xiyu; 6–0, 6–2	(Poland) Magda Linette	(Kazakhstan) Yulia Putintseva (Belgium) Greet Minnen	(Spain) Rebeka Masarova (Germany) Tatjana Maria (Italy) Lucia Bronzetti (Slovakia) Viktória Hrunčáková
18 Sep	Guangzhou Open; Guangzhou, China; WTA 250; Hard – $259,303 – 32S/24Q/16D; Singles – Doubles	(China) Guo Hanyu (China) Jiang Xinyu; 6–3, 7–6^{(7–4)}	(Japan) Eri Hozumi (Japan) Makoto Ninomiya	(Kazakhstan) Yulia Putintseva (Belgium) Greet Minnen	(Spain) Rebeka Masarova (Germany) Tatjana Maria (Italy) Lucia Bronzetti (Slovakia) Viktória Hrunčáková
25 Sep	Pan Pacific Open; Tokyo, Japan; WTA 500; Hard – $780,637 – 28S/24Q/16D; Singles – Doubles	Veronika Kudermetova; 7–5, 6–1	(United States) Jessica Pegula	Anastasia Pavlyuchenkova (Greece) Maria Sakkari	(Poland) Iga Świątek; Ekaterina Alexandrova (France) Caroline Garcia; Daria Kasatkina
25 Sep	Pan Pacific Open; Tokyo, Japan; WTA 500; Hard – $780,637 – 28S/24Q/16D; Singles – Doubles	(Norway) Ulrikke Eikeri (Estonia) Ingrid Neel; 3–6, 7–5, [10–5]	(Japan) Eri Hozumi (Japan) Makoto Ninomiya	Anastasia Pavlyuchenkova (Greece) Maria Sakkari	(Poland) Iga Świątek; Ekaterina Alexandrova (France) Caroline Garcia; Daria Kasatkina
25 Sep	Ningbo Open; Ningbo, China; WTA 250; Hard – $259,303 – 32S/24Q/15D; Singles – Doubles	(Tunisia) Ons Jabeur; 6–2, 6–1	Diana Shnaider	(Argentina) Nadia Podoroska (Czech Republic) Linda Fruhvirtová	Vera Zvonareva (Czech Republic) Kateřina Siniaková (Italy) Lucia Bronzetti (Czech Republic) Petra Kvitová
25 Sep	Ningbo Open; Ningbo, China; WTA 250; Hard – $259,303 – 32S/24Q/15D; Singles – Doubles	(Germany) Laura Siegemund; Vera Zvonareva; 4–6, 6–3, [10–5]	(China) Guo Hanyu (China) Jiang Xinyu	(Argentina) Nadia Podoroska (Czech Republic) Linda Fruhvirtová	Vera Zvonareva (Czech Republic) Kateřina Siniaková (Italy) Lucia Bronzetti (Czech Republic) Petra Kvitová

=== October ===
Week	Tournament	Champions	Runners-up	Semifinalists	Quarterfinalists
2 Oct	China Open; Beijing, China; WTA 1000 (Mandatory); Hard – $8,127,389 – 60S/32Q/28D; Singles – Doubles	(Poland) Iga Świątek; 6–2, 6–2	Liudmila Samsonova	(Kazakhstan) Elena Rybakina (United States) Coco Gauff	Aryna Sabalenka (Latvia) Jeļena Ostapenko (Greece) Maria Sakkari (France) Caroline Garcia
2 Oct	China Open; Beijing, China; WTA 1000 (Mandatory); Hard – $8,127,389 – 60S/32Q/28D; Singles – Doubles	(Czech Republic) Marie Bouzková (Spain) Sara Sorribes Tormo; 3–6, 6–0, [10–4]	(Chinese Taipei) Chan Hao-ching (Mexico) Giuliana Olmos	(Kazakhstan) Elena Rybakina (United States) Coco Gauff	Aryna Sabalenka (Latvia) Jeļena Ostapenko (Greece) Maria Sakkari (France) Caroline Garcia
9 Oct	Zhengzhou Open; Zhengzhou, China; WTA 500; Hard – $780,637 – 28S/24Q/16D; Singles – Doubles	(China) Zheng Qinwen; 2–6, 6–2, 6–4	(Czech Republic) Barbora Krejčíková	Daria Kasatkina (Italy) Jasmine Paolini	(Ukraine) Lesia Tsurenko (Tunisia) Ons Jabeur (Ukraine) Anhelina Kalinina (Germany) Laura Siegemund
9 Oct	Zhengzhou Open; Zhengzhou, China; WTA 500; Hard – $780,637 – 28S/24Q/16D; Singles – Doubles	(Canada) Gabriela Dabrowski (New Zealand) Erin Routliffe; 6–2, 6–4	(Japan) Shuko Aoyama (Japan) Ena Shibahara	Daria Kasatkina (Italy) Jasmine Paolini	(Ukraine) Lesia Tsurenko (Tunisia) Ons Jabeur (Ukraine) Anhelina Kalinina (Germany) Laura Siegemund
9 Oct	Hong Kong Open; Hong Kong, China SAR; WTA 250; Hard – $259,303 – 32S/16Q/16D; Singles – Doubles	(Canada) Leylah Fernandez; 3–6, 6–4, 6–4	(Czech Republic) Kateřina Siniaková	Anna Blinkova (Italy) Martina Trevisan	(Czech Republic) Linda Fruhvirtová (Spain) Sara Sorribes Tormo (Belgium) Elise Mertens; Anastasia Pavlyuchenkova
9 Oct	Hong Kong Open; Hong Kong, China SAR; WTA 250; Hard – $259,303 – 32S/16Q/16D; Singles – Doubles	(China) Tang Qianhui (Chinese Taipei) Tsao Chia-yi; 7–5, 1–6, [11–9]	(Georgia (country)) Oksana Kalashnikova; Aliaksandra Sasnovich	Anna Blinkova (Italy) Martina Trevisan	(Czech Republic) Linda Fruhvirtová (Spain) Sara Sorribes Tormo (Belgium) Elise Mertens; Anastasia Pavlyuchenkova
9 Oct	Korea Open; Seoul, South Korea; WTA 250; Hard – $259,303 – 32S/16Q/16D; Singles – Doubles	(United States) Jessica Pegula; 6–2, 6–3	(China) Yuan Yue	(Belgium) Yanina Wickmayer (United States) Emina Bektas	(United States) Claire Liu; Polina Kudermetova (Czech Republic) Marie Bouzková (Australia) Kimberly Birrell
9 Oct	Korea Open; Seoul, South Korea; WTA 250; Hard – $259,303 – 32S/16Q/16D; Singles – Doubles	(Czech Republic) Marie Bouzková (United States) Bethanie Mattek-Sands; 6–2, 6–1	(Thailand) Luksika Kumkhum (Thailand) Peangtarn Plipuech	(Belgium) Yanina Wickmayer (United States) Emina Bektas	(United States) Claire Liu; Polina Kudermetova (Czech Republic) Marie Bouzková (Australia) Kimberly Birrell
16 Oct	Jiangxi Open; Nanchang, China; WTA 250; Hard – $259,303 – 32S/13Q/16D; Singles – Doubles	(Czech Republic) Kateřina Siniaková; 1–6, 7–6^{(7–5)}, 7–6^{(7–4)}	(Czech Republic) Marie Bouzková	Diana Shnaider (Canada) Leylah Fernandez	(Japan) Nao Hibino (Colombia) Camila Osorio (Germany) Laura Siegemund; Aliaksandra Sasnovich
16 Oct	Jiangxi Open; Nanchang, China; WTA 250; Hard – $259,303 – 32S/13Q/16D; Singles – Doubles	(Germany) Laura Siegemund; Vera Zvonareva; 6–4, 6–2	(Japan) Eri Hozumi (Japan) Makoto Ninomiya	Diana Shnaider (Canada) Leylah Fernandez	(Japan) Nao Hibino (Colombia) Camila Osorio (Germany) Laura Siegemund; Aliaksandra Sasnovich
16 Oct	Transylvania Open; Cluj-Napoca, Romania; WTA 250; Hard (i) – $259,303 – 32S/15Q/16D; Singles – Doubles	(Germany) Tamara Korpatsch; 6–3, 6–4	(Romania) Elena-Gabriela Ruse	(Germany) Eva Lys (Spain) Rebeka Masarova	Ekaterina Makarova (Ukraine) Daria Snigur (Romania) Ana Bogdan (Colombia) Emiliana Arango
16 Oct	Transylvania Open; Cluj-Napoca, Romania; WTA 250; Hard (i) – $259,303 – 32S/15Q/16D; Singles – Doubles	(United Kingdom) Jodie Burrage (Switzerland) Jil Teichmann; 6–1, 6–4	(France) Léolia Jeanjean (Ukraine) Valeriya Strakhova	(Germany) Eva Lys (Spain) Rebeka Masarova	Ekaterina Makarova (Ukraine) Daria Snigur (Romania) Ana Bogdan (Colombia) Emiliana Arango
16 Oct	Jasmin Open; Monastir, Tunisia; WTA 250; Hard – $259,303 – 32S/16Q/16D; Singles – Doubles	(Belgium) Elise Mertens; 6–3, 6–0	(Italy) Jasmine Paolini	(Ukraine) Lesia Tsurenko (France) Clara Burel	(Italy) Lucia Bronzetti (Spain) Nuria Párrizas Díaz (Italy) Lucrezia Stefanini (Japan) Mai Hontama
16 Oct	Jasmin Open; Monastir, Tunisia; WTA 250; Hard – $259,303 – 32S/16Q/16D; Singles – Doubles	(Italy) Sara Errani (Italy) Jasmine Paolini; 2–6, 7–6^{(7–4)}, [10–6]	(Japan) Mai Hontama (Serbia) Natalija Stevanović	(Ukraine) Lesia Tsurenko (France) Clara Burel	(Italy) Lucia Bronzetti (Spain) Nuria Párrizas Díaz (Italy) Lucrezia Stefanini (Japan) Mai Hontama
23 Oct	WTA Elite Trophy; Zhuhai, China; Year-end championships Hard – $2,600,000 – 12S/6D; Singles – Doubles	(Brazil) Beatriz Haddad Maia; 7–6^{(13–11)}, 7–6^{(7–4)}	(China) Zheng Qinwen	Daria Kasatkina (China) Zhu Lin	Round robin (Czech Republic) Barbora Krejčíková (Poland) Magda Linette (France) Caroline Garcia (United States) Madison Keys (Latvia) Jeļena Ostapenko (Croatia) Donna Vekić; Liudmila Samsonova; Veronika Kudermetova
23 Oct	WTA Elite Trophy; Zhuhai, China; Year-end championships Hard – $2,600,000 – 12S/6D; Singles – Doubles	(Brazil) Beatriz Haddad Maia; Veronika Kudermetova; 6–3, 6–3	(Japan) Miyu Kato (Indonesia) Aldila Sutjiadi	Daria Kasatkina (China) Zhu Lin	Round robin (Czech Republic) Barbora Krejčíková (Poland) Magda Linette (France) Caroline Garcia (United States) Madison Keys (Latvia) Jeļena Ostapenko (Croatia) Donna Vekić; Liudmila Samsonova; Veronika Kudermetova
30 Oct	WTA Finals; Cancún, Mexico; Year-end championships Hard – $9,000,000 – 8S/8D; Singles – Doubles	(Poland) Iga Świątek; 6–1, 6–0	(United States) Jessica Pegula	(United States) Coco Gauff; Aryna Sabalenka	Round robin (Greece) Maria Sakkari (Kazakhstan) Elena Rybakina (Czech Republic) Markéta Vondroušová (Tunisia) Ons Jabeur
30 Oct	WTA Finals; Cancún, Mexico; Year-end championships Hard – $9,000,000 – 8S/8D; Singles – Doubles	(Germany) Laura Siegemund; Vera Zvonareva; 6–4, 6–4	(United States) Nicole Melichar-Martinez (Australia) Ellen Perez	(United States) Coco Gauff; Aryna Sabalenka	Round robin (Greece) Maria Sakkari (Kazakhstan) Elena Rybakina (Czech Republic) Markéta Vondroušová (Tunisia) Ons Jabeur

=== November ===
Week	Tournament	Champions	Runners-up	Semifinalists	Round robin
6 Nov	Billie Jean King Cup Finals; Seville, Spain; Hard (i) – 12 teams	Canada; 2–0	Italy	Slovenia; Czech Republic	United States; Switzerland; Kazakhstan; Australia; Spain; Poland; France; Germany

=== Cancelled tournaments ===
The following tournaments were cancelled due to various reasons.

Week	Tournament	Status
17 Apr	İstanbul Cup; Istanbul, Turkey; WTA 250; Clay	Cancelled due to diversion of funds towards earthquake relief
31 Jul	Silicon Valley Classic; San Jose, United States; WTA 500; Hard	Merged with Citi Open in Washington, D.C. to become Mubadala Citi Open as a WTA 500 event
21 Aug	Championnats de Granby; Granby, Canada; WTA 250; Hard	Cancelled due to scheduling issues with US Open qualifying in the same week
2 Oct	Tallinn Open; Tallinn, Estonia; WTA 250; Hard (i)	Cancelled due to lack of financial support from local administration

== Statistical information ==
These tables present the number of singles (S), doubles (D), and mixed doubles (X) titles won by each player and each nation during the season, within all the tournament categories of the 2022 WTA Tour: the Grand Slam tournaments, the year-end championships (the WTA Finals), the WTA Premier tournaments (WTA 1000 and WTA 500), and the WTA 250. The players/nations are sorted by:

1. total number of titles (a doubles title won by two players representing the same nation counts as only one win for the nation);
2. cumulated importance of those titles (one Grand Slam win equalling two WTA 1000 wins, one year-end championships win equalling one-and-a-half WTA 1000 win, one WTA 1000 win equalling two WTA 500 wins, one WTA 500 win equalling two WTA 250 wins);
3. a singles > doubles > mixed doubles hierarchy;
4. alphabetical order (by family names for players).

=== Key ===
Grand Slam tournaments
Year-end championships
WTA 1000 (Mandatory)
WTA 1000 (Non-mandatory)
WTA 500
WTA 250

=== Titles won by player ===
Total	Player	Grand Slam			Year-end		WTA 1000 (M)		WTA 1000 (NM)		WTA 500		WTA 250		Total		
Total	Player	S	D	X	S	D	S	D	S	D	S	D	S	D	S	D	X
6	Iga Świątek (POL)	●			●		●				● ●		●		6	0	0
6	Coco Gauff (USA)	●						●	●		●	●	●		4	2	0
6	Barbora Krejčíková (CZE)		●					●	●		●	●		●	2	4	0
5	Kateřina Siniaková (CZE)		●					●				●	● ●		2	3	0
5	Laura Siegemund (GER)					●						●		● ● ●	0	5	0
4	Luisa Stefani (BRA)			●								● ● ●			0	3	1
4	Vera Zvonareva (Note: As of 1 March 2022, the WTA announced that players from Russia and Belarus will not compete in tournaments under the name or flag of Russia or Belarus due to the Russian invasion of Ukraine.)					●						●		● ●	0	4	0
4	Jessica Pegula (USA)							●	●			●	●		2	2	0
3	Beatriz Haddad Maia (BRA)				●	●		●							1	2	0
3	Aryna Sabalenka	●					●				●				3	0	0
3	Veronika Kudermetova					●				●	●				1	2	0
3	Erin Routliffe (NZL)		●									●		●	0	3	0
3	Miyu Kato (JPN)			●										● ●	0	2	1
3	Elise Mertens (BEL)							●		●			●		1	2	0
3	Taylor Townsend (USA)									●		● ●			0	3	0
3	Desirae Krawczyk (USA)											● ● ●			0	3	0
3	Aldila Sutjiadi (INA)													● ● ●	0	3	0
2	Hsieh Su-wei (TPE)		● ●												0	2	0
2	Gabriela Dabrowski (CAN)		●									●			0	2	0
2	Anna Danilina (KAZ)			●										●	0	1	1
2	Elena Rybakina (KAZ)						● ●								2	0	0
2	Storm Hunter (AUS)							●		●					0	2	0
2	Petra Kvitová (CZE)						●				●				2	0	0
2	Alycia Parks (USA)									●			●		1	1	0
2	Sara Sorribes Tormo (ESP)							●					●		1	1	0
2	Marie Bouzková (CZE)							●						●	0	2	0
2	Shuko Aoyama (JPN)									●				●	0	2	0
2	Ena Shibahara (JPN)									●				●	0	2	0
2	Belinda Bencic (SUI)										● ●				2	0	0
2	Ons Jabeur (TUN)										●		●		2	0	0
2	Zheng Qinwen (CHN)										●		●		2	0	0
2	Demi Schuurs (NED)											● ●			0	2	0
2	Ulrikke Eikeri (NOR)											●		●	0	2	0
2	Ingrid Neel (EST)											●		●	0	2	0
2	Nao Hibino (JPN)												●	●	1	1	0
2	Marta Kostyuk (UKR)												●	●	1	1	0
2	Diane Parry (FRA)													● ●	0	2	0
2	Yana Sizikova													● ●	0	2	0
1	Markéta Vondroušová (CZE)	●													1	0	0
1	Barbora Strýcová (CZE)		●												0	1	0
1	Wang Xinyu (CHN)		●												0	1	0
1	Lyudmyla Kichenok (UKR)			●											0	0	1
1	Victoria Azarenka							●							0	1	0
1	Maria Sakkari (GRE)								●						1	0	0
1	Liudmila Samsonova									●					0	1	0
1	Madison Keys (USA)										●				1	0	0
1	Danielle Collins (USA)											●			0	1	0
1	Caroline Garcia (FRA)											●			0	1	0
1	Asia Muhammad (USA)											●			0	1	0
1	Zhang Shuai (CHN)											●			0	1	0
1	Ekaterina Alexandrova												●		1	0	0
1	Katie Boulter (GBR)												●		1	0	0
1	Lucia Bronzetti (ITA)												●		1	0	0
1	Elisabetta Cocciaretto (ITA)												●		1	0	0
1	Lauren Davis (USA)												●		1	0	0
1	Leylah Fernandez (CAN)												●		1	0	0
1	Camila Giorgi (ITA)												●		1	0	0
1	Tamara Korpatsch (GER)												●		1	0	0
1	Ashlyn Krueger (USA)												●		1	0	0
1	Tatjana Maria (GER)												●		1	0	0
1	Jeļena Ostapenko (LAT)												●		1	0	0
1	Anastasia Potapova												●		1	0	0
1	Arantxa Rus (NED)												●		1	0	0
1	Elina Svitolina (UKR)												●		1	0	0
1	Maria Timofeeva												●		1	0	0
1	Donna Vekić (CRO)												●		1	0	0
1	Wang Xiyu (CHN)												●		1	0	0
1	Zhu Lin (CHN)												●		1	0	0
1	Anna Bondár (HUN)													●	0	1	0
1	Cristina Bucșa (ESP)													●	0	1	0
1	Jodie Burrage (GBR)													●	0	1	0
1	Chan Hao-ching (TPE)													●	0	1	0
1	Natela Dzalamidze (GEO)													●	0	1	0
1	Sara Errani (ITA)													●	0	1	0
1	Kirsten Flipkens (BEL)													●	0	1	0
1	Anna-Lena Friedsam (GER)													●	0	1	0
1	Ingrid Gamarra Martins (BRA)													●	0	1	0
1	Guo Hanyu (CHN)													●	0	1	0
1	Viktória Hrunčáková (SVK)													●	0	1	0
1	Jiang Xinyu (CHN)													●	0	1	0
1	Oksana Kalashnikova (GEO)													●	0	1	0
1	Irina Khromacheva													●	0	1	0
1	Nadiia Kichenok (UKR)													●	0	1	0
1	Yuliana Lizarazo (COL)													●	0	1	0
1	Lidziya Marozava													●	0	1	0
1	Bethanie Mattek-Sands (USA)													●	0	1	0
1	Caty McNally (USA)													●	0	1	0
1	Alexandra Panova													●	0	1	0
1	Jasmine Paolini (ITA)													●	0	1	0
1	María Paulina Pérez (COL)													●	0	1	0
1	Katarzyna Piter (POL)													●	0	1	0
1	Sabrina Santamaria (USA)													●	0	1	0
1	Bibiane Schoofs (NED)													●	0	1	0
1	Iryna Shymanovich													●	0	1	0
1	Fanny Stollár (HUN)													●	0	1	0
1	Tang Qianhui (CHN)													●	0	1	0
1	Jil Teichmann (SUI)													●	0	1	0
1	Tsao Chia-yi (TPE)													●	0	1	0
1	Heather Watson (GBR)													●	0	1	0
1	Yanina Wickmayer (BEL)													●	0	1	0
1	Wu Fang-hsien (TPE)													●	0	1	0
1	Xu Yifan (CHN)													●	0	1	0
1	Yang Zhaoxuan (CHN)													●	0	1	0
1	Kimberley Zimmermann (BEL)													●	0	1	0

=== Titles won by nation ===
Total	Nation	Grand Slam			Year-end		WTA 1000 (M)		WTA 1000 (NM)		WTA 500		WTA 250		Total		
Total	Nation	S	D	X	S	D	S	D	S	D	S	D	S	D	S	D	X
21	United States (USA)	1						1	2	1	2	6	5	2	10	11	0
14	Czech Republic (CZE)	1	2				1	2	1		2	1	2	2	7	7	0
9	China (CHN)		1								1	1	3	3	4	5	0
8	Brazil (BRA)			1	1	1		1				3		1	1	6	1
8	Germany (GER)					1						1	2	4	2	6	0
7	Poland (POL)	1			1		1				2		1	1	6	1	0
7	Japan (JPN)			1						1			1	4	1	5	1
6	Belgium (BEL)							1		1			1	3	1	5	0
5	Ukraine (UKR)			1									2	2	2	2	1
4	Chinese Taipei (TPE)		2											2	0	4	0
4	Kazakhstan (KAZ)			1			2							1	2	1	1
4	Netherlands (NED)											2	1	1	1	3	0
4	Italy (ITA)												3	1	3	1	0
3	Canada (CAN)		1									1	1		1	2	0
3	New Zealand (NZL)		1									1		1	0	3	0
3	Spain (ESP)							1					1	1	1	2	0
3	Switzerland (SUI)										2			1	2	1	0
3	France (FRA)											1		2	0	3	0
3	Great Britain (GBR)												1	2	1	2	0
3	Indonesia (INA)													3	0	3	0
2	Australia (AUS)							1		1					0	2	0
2	Tunisia (TUN)										1		1		2	0	0
2	Estonia (EST)											1		1	0	2	0
2	Norway (NOR)											1		1	0	2	0
2	Georgia (GEO)													2	0	2	0
2	Hungary (HUN)													2	0	2	0
1	Greece (GRE)								1						1	0	0
1	Croatia (CRO)												1		1	0	0
1	Latvia (LAT)												1		1	0	0
1	Colombia (COL)													1	0	1	0
1	Slovakia (SVK)													1	0	1	0

=== Titles information ===
The following players won their first main circuit title in singles, doubles, or mixed doubles:

Singles

- (China) Zhu Lin (29 years, 8 days) – Hua Hin (draw)
- (United States) Alycia Parks (22 years, 36 days) – Lyon (draw)
- (Ukraine) Marta Kostyuk (20 years, 250 days) – Austin (draw)
- (Italy) Lucia Bronzetti (24 years, 168 days) – Rabat (draw)
- (United Kingdom) Katie Boulter (27 years, 161 days) – Nottingham (draw)
- Maria Timofeeva (19 years, 247 days) – Budapest (draw)
- (China) Zheng Qinwen (20 years, 288 days) – Palermo (draw)
- (Netherlands) Arantxa Rus (32 years, 228 days) – Hamburg (draw)
- (Italy) Elisabetta Cocciaretto (22 years, 186 days) – Lausanne (draw)
- (United States) Ashlyn Krueger (19 years, 133 days) – Osaka (draw)
- (China) Wang Xiyu (22 years, 179 days) – Guangzhou (draw)
- (Germany) Tamara Korpatsch (28 years, 163 days) – Cluj-Napoca (draw)

Doubles

- (Spain) Cristina Bucșa – Lyon (draw)
- (Chinese Taipei) Wu Fang-hsien – Hua Hin (draw)
- Liudmila Samsonova – Dubai (draw)
- (France) Diane Parry – Mérida (draw)
- (Colombia) Yuliana Lizarazo – Monterrey (draw)
- (Colombia) María Paulina Pérez – Monterrey (draw)
- Iryna Shymanovich – Bogotá (draw)
- (United States) Danielle Collins – Charleston (draw)
- (Brazil) Ingrid Gamarra Martins – Bad Homburg (draw)
- (China) Guo Hanyu – Guangzhou (draw)
- (Chinese Taipei) Tsao Chia-yi – Hong Kong (draw)
- (United Kingdom) Jodie Burrage – Cluj-Napoca (draw)

Mixed

- (Brazil) Luisa Stefani – **Australian Open** (draw)
- (Japan) Miyu Kato – **French Open** (draw)
- (Ukraine) Lyudmyla Kichenok – **Wimbledon** (draw)
- (Kazakhstan) Anna Danilina – **US Open** (draw)

The following players defended a main circuit title in singles, doubles, or mixed doubles:

Singles

- (Poland) Iga Świątek – Doha (draw), Stuttgart (draw), **French Open** (draw)
- (Germany) Tatjana Maria – Bogotá (draw)
- Ekaterina Alexandrova – 's-Hertogenbosch (draw)
- (Belgium) Elise Mertens – Monastir (draw)

Doubles

- (Czech Republic) Barbora Krejčíková – **Australian Open** (draw)
- (Czech Republic) Kateřina Siniaková – **Australian Open** (draw)
- (Georgia (country)) Natela Dzalamidze – Linz (draw)
- (United States) Coco Gauff – Doha (draw)
- (United States) Jessica Pegula – Doha (draw)
- Veronika Kudermetova – Dubai (draw)
- (United States) Desirae Krawczyk – Stuttgart (draw)
- (Netherlands) Demi Schuurs – Stuttgart (draw)
- (Belgium) Kimberley Zimmermann – Palermo (draw)
- (Australia) Storm Hunter – Guadalajara (draw)

=== Best ranking ===
The following players achieved their career-high ranking in this season inside top 50 (players who made their top 10 debut indicated in bold): (Note: Name and ranking in bold means the player entered the top 10 or became world No. 1 for the first time, and only the ranking in bold means the player had entered the top 10 previously but reached a new career-high ranking.)

Singles

- (China) Wang Xiyu (reached place No. 49 on January 9)
- (China) Zhang Shuai (reached place No. 22 on January 16)
- Ekaterina Alexandrova (reached place No. 16 on February 20)
- Liudmila Samsonova (reached place No. 12 on February 27)
- (Poland) Magda Linette (reached place No. 19 on March 20)
- (Australia) Ajla Tomljanović (reached place No. 32 on April 3)
- (Italy) Martina Trevisan (reached place No. 18 on May 8)
- (Ukraine) Anhelina Kalinina (reached place No. 25 on May 22)
- (Kazakhstan) **Elena Rybakina** (reached place **No. 3** on June 12)
- (Brazil) **Beatriz Haddad Maia** (reached place **No. 10** on June 12)
- (United States) Bernarda Pera (reached place No. 27 on June 12)
- Anastasia Potapova (reached place No. 21 on June 19)
- (Egypt) Mayar Sherif (reached place No. 31 on June 19)
- (Czech Republic) Linda Fruhvirtová (reached place No. 49 on June 26)
- (Italy) Lucia Bronzetti (reached place No. 47 on July 3)
- (Romania) Ana Bogdan (reached place No. 39 on July 24)
- (Ukraine) Marta Kostyuk (reached place No. 32 on August 7)
- Anna Blinkova (reached place No. 34 on August 7)
- (France) Varvara Gracheva (reached place No. 40 on August 7)
- (United States) Alycia Parks (reached place No. 40 on August 14)
- (Netherlands) Arantxa Rus (reached place No. 41 on August 14)
- (Italy) Elisabetta Cocciaretto (reached place No. 29 on August 21)
- **Aryna Sabalenka** (reached place **No. 1** on September 11)
- (United States) Coco Gauff (reached place **No. 3** on September 11)
- (Czech Republic) **Markéta Vondroušová** (reached place **No. 6** on September 11)
- (Czech Republic) **Karolína Muchová** (reached place **No. 8** on September 11)
- (United Kingdom) Katie Boulter (reached place No. 50 on September 11)
- (China) Zhu Lin (reached place No. 31 on September 18)
- (United States) Peyton Stearns (reached place No. 43 on September 18)
- (United States) Caroline Dolehide (reached place No. 41 on October 2)
- (China) Wang Xinyu (reached place No. 32 on October 9)
- (Czech Republic) Linda Nosková (reached place No. 40 on October 9)
- (Italy) Jasmine Paolini (reached place No. 29 on October 23)
- (China) Zheng Qinwen (reached place No. 15 on November 6)
- Mirra Andreeva (reached place No. 46 on November 6)
- (United States) Emma Navarro (reached place No. 32 on November 20)

Doubles

- (Kazakhstan) **Anna Danilina** (reached place **No. 10** on January 9)
- (United States) Asia Muhammad (reached place No. 26 on January 9)
- (Slovenia) Tamara Zidanšek (reached place No. 47 on January 16)
- (China) **Yang Zhaoxuan** (reached place **No. 9** on January 30)
- (Slovakia) Tereza Mihalíková (reached place No. 42 on January 30)
- (Hungary) Anna Bondár (reached place No. 43 on January 30)
- Anna Kalinskaya (reached place No. 49 on February 6)
- (Belgium) Kimberley Zimmermann (reached place No. 37 on March 6)
- (Ukraine) Lyudmyla Kichenok (reached place **No. 7** on March 20)
- (Mexico) Giuliana Olmos (reached place **No. 6** on April 10)
- (Brazil) **Beatriz Haddad Maia** (reached place **No. 10** on May 8)
- (Ukraine) Marta Kostyuk (reached place No. 27 on May 8)
- (Romania) Elena-Gabriela Ruse (reached place No. 32 on May 8)
- (United States) **Taylor Townsend** (reached place **No. 5** on June 12)
- (Australia) **Ellen Perez** (reached place **No. 9** on June 12)
- Liudmila Samsonova (reached place No. 40 on June 12)
- Yana Sizikova (reached place No. 42 on June 12)
- (United States) Nicole Melichar-Martinez (reached place **No. 6** on July 3)
- (United States) Desirae Krawczyk (reached place **No. 8** on August 14)
- (United States) **Jessica Pegula** (reached place **No. 1** on September 11)
- (China) Wang Xinyu (reached place No. 18 on September 11)
- (United States) Alycia Parks (reached place No. 27 on September 11)
- (Czech Republic) Markéta Vondroušová (reached place No. 38 on September 11)
- (Czech Republic) Miriam Kolodziejová (reached place No. 41 on September 11)
- (Georgia (country)) Oksana Kalashnikova (reached place No. 42 on September 11)
- (Norway) Ulrikke Eikeri (reached place No. 38 on October 2)
- (Estonia) Ingrid Neel (reached place No. 39 on October 2)
- (Canada) Leylah Fernandez (reached place No. 17 on October 23)
- (Czech Republic) Marie Bouzková (reached place No. 23 on October 23)
- (Indonesia) Aldila Sutjiadi (reached place No. 26 on October 23)
- (Japan) Miyu Kato (reached place No. 27 on October 23)
- (Spain) Sara Sorribes Tormo (reached place No. 33 on October 23)
- (Australia) **Storm Hunter** (reached place **No. 1** on November 6)
- (Germany) **Laura Siegemund** (reached place **No. 5** on November 6)
- (New Zealand) Erin Routliffe (reached place No. 11 on November 6)
- (Brazil) Ingrid Gamarra Martins (reached place No. 47 on November 6)

== WTA rankings ==
Below are the tables for the yearly WTA Race rankings (Note: The WTA Race rankings measure the points a player (for singles) or team (for doubles) has accumulated over the season leading up to the year-end WTA Finals.) and the WTA rankings (Note: The WTA rankings are the weekly computer ratings defined by the WTA and are based on a rolling, 52-week cumulative system.) of the top 20 singles players, doubles players, and doubles teams.

=== Singles ===
Final singles race rankings
No.	Player	Points	Tourn
1	Aryna Sabalenka	8,425	15
2	**Iga Świątek** (POL)	7,795	18
3	Coco Gauff (USA)	5,955	18
4	Elena Rybakina (KAZ)	5,865	17
5	Jessica Pegula (USA)	4,895	19
6	Ons Jabeur (TUN)	3,695	20
7	Markéta Vondroušová (CZE)	3,671	16
8	Karolína Muchová (CZE)	3,651	16
9	Maria Sakkari (GRE)	3,245	23
10	Barbora Krejčíková (CZE)	2,775	20
11	Madison Keys (USA)	2,737	17
12	Petra Kvitová (CZE)	2,660	17
13	Jeļena Ostapenko (LAT)	2,615	22
14	Belinda Bencic (SUI)	2,570	18
15	Liudmila Samsonova	2,545	23
16	Veronika Kudermetova	2,460	24
17	Daria Kasatkina	2,410	24
18	Zheng Qinwen (CHN)	2,275	22
19	Beatriz Haddad Maia (BRA)	2,210	22
20	Caroline Garcia (FRA)	2,035	26

**Champions** in bold
Runners-up in italics

Qualified for the WTA Finals.

WTA singles year-end rankings
#	Player	Points	#Trn	'22 Rk	High	Low	'22→'23
1	Iga Świątek (POL)	9,295	19	1	1	2	Steady
2	Aryna Sabalenka	9,050	16	5	1	5	▲3
3	Coco Gauff (USA)	6,580	19	7	3	7	▲4
4	Elena Rybakina (KAZ)	6,365	18	22	3	25	▲18
5	Jessica Pegula (USA)	5,975	20	3	3	5	▼2
6	Ons Jabeur (TUN)	4,195	21	2	2	7	▼4
7	Markéta Vondroušová (CZE)	4,075	17	99	6	105	▲92
8	Karolína Muchová (CZE)	3,651	16	149	8	151	▲141
9	Maria Sakkari (GRE)	3,620	24	6	6	10	▼3
10	Barbora Krejčíková (CZE)	2,880	21	21	10	30	▲11
11	Beatriz Haddad Maia (BRA)	2,855	23	15	10	21	▲4
12	Madison Keys (USA)	2,816	18	11	10	25	▼1
13	Jeļena Ostapenko (LAT)	2,720	23	18	12	26	▲5
14	Petra Kvitová (CZE)	2,660	17	16	8	16	▲2
15	Zheng Qinwen (CHN)	2,660	23	25	15	30	▲10
16	Liudmila Samsonova	2,650	24	20	12	22	▲4
17	Belinda Bencic (SUI)	2,570	18	12	9	17	▼5
18	Daria Kasatkina	2,550	25	8	8	18	▼10
19	Veronika Kudermetova	2,520	25	9	9	19	▼10
20	Caroline Garcia (FRA)	2,095	27	4	4	20	▼16

==== No. 1 ranking ====
Holder	Date gained	Date forfeited
Iga Świątek (POL)	**Year-end 2022**	10 September 2023
Aryna Sabalenka	11 September 2023	5 November 2023
**Iga Świątek** (POL)	6 November 2023	**Year-end 2023**

=== Doubles ===
Final Doubles Race rankings
No.	Player	Points	Tourn
1	Coco Gauff (USA); Jessica Pegula (USA)	5,565	13
2	Storm Hunter (AUS); Elise Mertens (BEL)	5,130	12
3	Shuko Aoyama (JPN); Ena Shibahara (JPN)	3,790	21
4	Kateřina Siniaková (CZE); Barbora Krejčíková (CZE)	3,785	8
5	Desirae Krawczyk (USA); Demi Schuurs (NED)	3,570	18
6	**Laura Siegemund** (GER); **Vera Zvonareva**	3,405	14
7	Gabriela Dabrowski (CAN); Erin Routliffe (NZ)	3,386	8
8	Nicole Melichar-Martinez (USA); Ellen Perez (AUS)	3,325	24
9	Taylor Townsend (USA); Leylah Fernandez (CAN)	3,310	8
10	Hsieh Su-wei (TPE); Wang Xinyu (CHN)	2,955	5

**Champions** in bold
Runners-up in italics

Qualified for the WTA Finals.

WTA Doubles Year-End Rankings
#	Player	Points	#Trn	'22 Rk	High	Low	'22→'23
1	Storm Sanders (AUS)	6,055	18	10	1	14	▲9
2	Elise Mertens (BEL)	5,870	15	5	1	9	▲3
3	Jessica Pegula (USA)	5,755	15	6	1	6	▲3
3	Coco Gauff (USA)	5,755	14	4	1	6	▲1
5	Laura Siegemund (GER)	5,585	22	27	5	31	▲22
6	Hsieh Su-wei (TPE)	5,241	10	NR	4	NR	▲NR
7	Taylor Townsend (USA)	5,180	12	31	5	31	▲24
8	Gabriela Dabrowski (CAN)	5,115	20	7	6	20	▼1
9	Vera Zvonareva	5,070	23	34	9	135	▲25
10	Kateřina Siniaková (CZE)	4,895	12	1	1	10	▼9
11	Erin Routliffe (NZ)	6,035	33	30	11	60	▲19
12	Shuko Aoyama (JPN)	4,695	27	23	10	25	▲11
13	Barbora Krejčíková (CZE)	4,665	11	3	2	13	▼10
14	Ena Shibahara (JPN)	4,525	26	22	13	25	▲8
15	Nicole Melichar-Martinez (USA)	4,275	29	19	6	23	▲4
16	Desirae Krawczyk (USA)	4,166	23	16	8	17	Steady
17	Ellen Perez (AUS)	4,150	29	20	9	25	▲3
18	Luisa Stefani (BRA)	3,970	20	47	10	47	▲29
19	Demi Schuurs (NED)	3,815	12	18	9	19	▼1
20	Leylah Fernandez (CAN)	3,690	12	77	17	83	▲57

==== No. 1 ranking ====
Holder	Date gained	Date forfeited
Kateřina Siniaková (CZE)	**Year end 2022**	10 September 2023
Coco Gauff (USA); Jessica Pegula (USA)	11 September 2023	17 September 2023
Kateřina Siniaková (CZE)	18 September 2023	24 September 2023
Elise Mertens (BEL)	25 September 2023	22 October 2023
Coco Gauff (USA); Jessica Pegula (USA)	23 October 2023	5 November 2023
**Storm Hunter** (AUS)	6 November 2023	**Year end 2023**

== Points distribution ==
Points are awarded as follows:

Category	W	F	SF	QF	R16	R32	R64	R128	Q	Q3	Q2	Q1
Grand Slam (S)	2000	1300	780	430	240	130	70	10	40	30	20	2
Grand Slam (D)	2000	1300	780	430	240	130	10	–	40	–	–	–
WTA Finals (S)	1500*	1080*	750*	(+125 per round robin match; +125 per round robin win)								
WTA Finals (D)	1500	1080	750	375	–							
WTA 1000 (96S)	1000	650	390	215	120	65	35	10	30	–	20	2
WTA 1000 (64/60S)	1000	650	390	215	120	65	10	–	30	–	20	2
WTA 1000 (28/32D)	1000	650	390	215	120	10	–	–	–	–	–	–
WTA 1000 (56S, 48Q/32Q)	900	585	350	190	105	60	1	–	30	–	20	1
WTA 1000 (28D)	900	585	350	190	105	1	–	–	–	–	–	–
WTA 500 (64/56S)	470	305	185	100	55	30	1	–	25	–	13	1
WTA 500 (32/30/28S)	470	305	185	100	55	1	–	–	25	18	13	1
WTA 500 (28D)	470	305	185	100	55	1	–	–	–	–	–	–
WTA 500 (16D)	470	305	185	100	1	–	–	–	–	–	–	–
WTA 250 (32S, 32Q)	280	180	110	60	30	1	–	–	18	14	10	1
WTA 250 (32S, 24/16Q)	280	180	110	60	30	1	–	–	18	–	12	1
WTA 250 (28D)	280	180	110	60	30	1	–	–	–	–	–	–
WTA 250 (16D)	280	180	110	60	1	–	–	–	–	–	–	–
United Cup	500 (max)	For details, see 2023 United Cup										

S = singles players, D = doubles teams, Q = qualification players
* Assumes undefeated round robin match record

== Prize money leaders ==
Prize money won in 2023 in US$
#	Player	Singles	Doubles	Mixed doubles	Total
1.	(Poland) Iga Świątek	$9,857,686	$0	$0	$9,857,686
2.	Aryna Sabalenka	$8,195,703	$6,950	$0	$8,202,653
3.	(United States) Coco Gauff	$5,953,882	$715,740	$0	$6,669,622
4.	(United States) Jessica Pegula	$5,200,095	$715,740	$52,054	$5,967,890
5.	(Kazakhstan) Elena Rybakina	$5,429,334	$64,103	$0	$5,493,437
6.	(Czech Republic) Markéta Vondroušová	$4,334,528	$138,750	$0	$4,473,278
7.	(Tunisia) Ons Jabeur	$3,175,679	$18,885	$0	$3,194,564
8.	(Brazil) Beatriz Haddad Maia	$2,468,715	$390,106	$0	$2,858,821
9.	(Czech Republic) Karolína Muchová	$2,796,338	$8,100	$0	$2,804,438
10.	(Greece) Maria Sakkari	$2,600,139	$5,274	$0	$2,605,413

== Retirements ==
The following is a list of notable players (winners of a main tour title, and/or part of the WTA rankings top 100 in singles, or top 100 in doubles, for at least one week) who announced their retirement from professional tennis, became inactive (after not playing for more than 52 weeks), or were permanently banned from playing, during the 2023 season:

- (Slovakia) Jana Čepelová joined the professional tour in 2012. She reached career-high rankings of world No. 50 in singles in May 2014. Čepelová announced her retirement in June and played her last professional match at the 2023 US Open.
- (Japan) Misaki Doi announced in August that she will play the final tournaments of her career on home soil in Osaka and Tokyo.
- (United States) Irina Falconi joined the professional tour in 2010 and reached a career-high ranking of No. 63 in singles in May 2016 and No. 70 in doubles in June 2013. She won one singles title. Falconi announced her retirement in August 2023 and played her last professional match at the 2023 Wimbledon Championships.
- (Belgium) Kirsten Flipkens joined the professional tour in 2003 and reached a career-high ranking of No. 13 in singles in August 2013 and No. 23 in doubles in July 2019. She won one singles title and seven doubles titles. Flipkens announced her retirement in July 2023 and played her last professional match at the 2023 Wimbledon Championships.

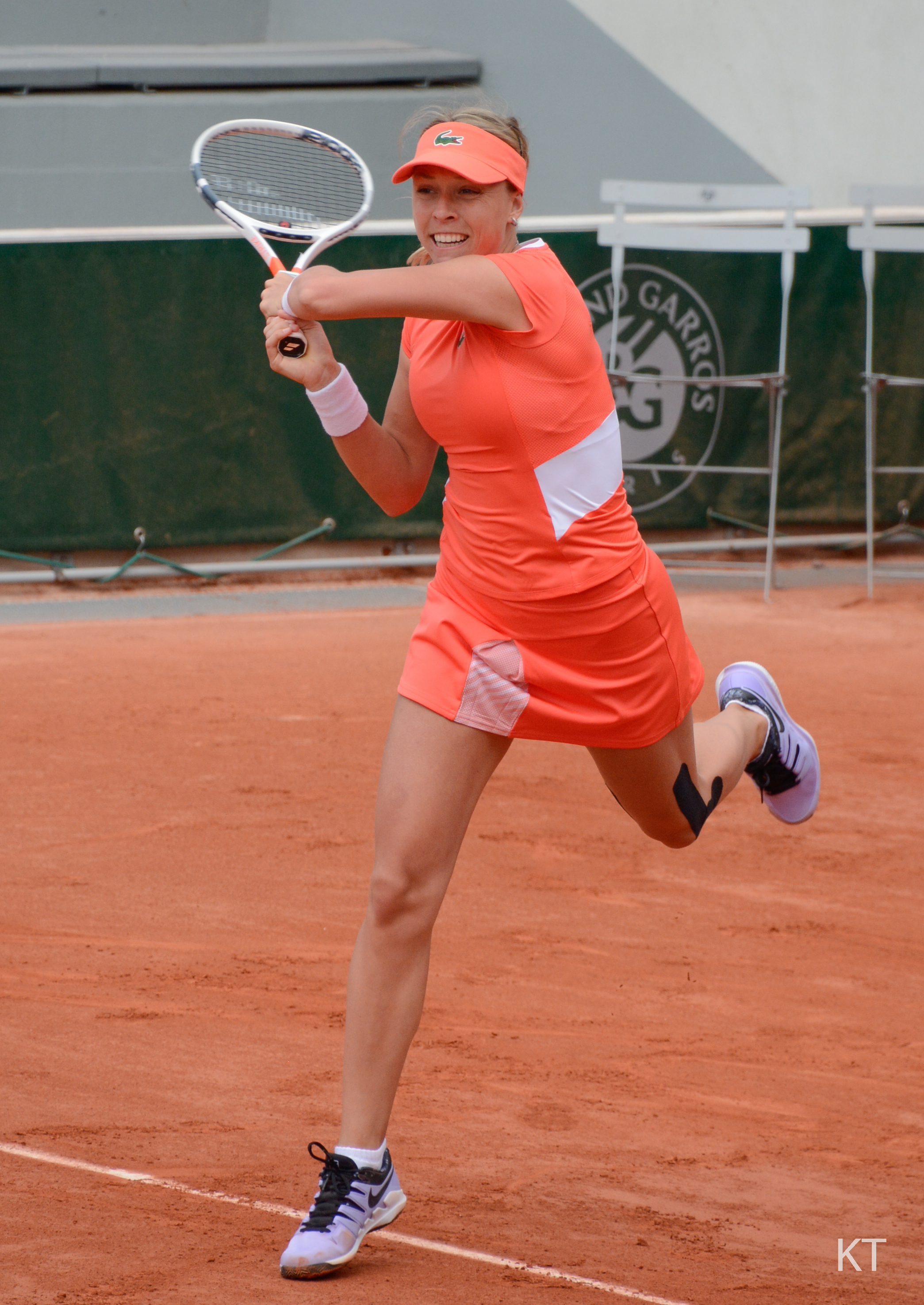
Kontaveit (pictured in 2019) reached a career-high singles ranking of No. 2 and won six singles titles.

- (Estonia) Anett Kontaveit joined the professional tour in 2010 and reached a career-high ranking of No. 2 in singles in June 2022 to become the highest-ranked Estonian player in history. She won six singles titles and reached the final of the 2021 WTA Finals. Kontaveit produced her best performance at a Grand Slam tournament at the 2020 Australian Open, where she reached the quarterfinals. She announced her retirement on 20 June following her diagnosis of lumbar disc degeneration and played her last professional matches in the singles and mixed doubles tournaments at the 2023 Wimbledon Championships.
- (Slovakia) Kristína Kučová joined the professional tour in 2007 and reached a career-high ranking of No. 71 in singles in September 2016. Kučová retired from professional tennis in October 2023, with her final appearance being at the 2023 Jasmin Open.
- (India) Sania Mirza announced her retirement on 7 January after the Dubai Tennis Championships in February.
- (Japan) Ayumi Morita joined the professional tour in 2005. She reached career-high rankings of world No. 40 in singles in October 2011 and world No. 65 in doubles in February 2009, and was a two-time doubles finalist on the WTA Tour. She produced her best performance at a Grand Slam tournament at the Australian Open in 2011 and 2013 when she reached the third round on both occasions. She played her last professional match in November 2022 at an event in Tokyo on the ITF Women's World Tennis Tour, where she lost to Han Na-lae. Morita announced her retirement on 4 August 2023 following a string of injuries and will receive a ceremony at the Ariake Coliseum in September 2023.
- (Australia) Anastasia Rodionova joined the professional tour in 1997 and reached a career-high ranking of No. 62 in singles in August 2010 and No. 15 in doubles in September 2014. She won eleven doubles titles. Her greatest career achievements have come in doubles, having reached the finals of the mixed-doubles event at the 2003 Wimbledon Championships with Andy Ram and the semifinals of the women's doubles event at the 2010 US Open with Cara Black. Rodionova announced her retirement in August 2023.
- (Australia) Samantha Stosur announced on 14 January on her Instagram that the 2023 Australian Open will be the last tournament of her career.
- (Czech Republic) Barbora Strýcová played her last professional match in September 2023 at the US Open in mixed doubles partnering Santiago Gonzalez.
- (United States) CoCo Vandeweghe joined the professional tour in 2008. She reached career-high rankings of world No. 9 in singles in January 2018 and world No. 14 in doubles in October 2018. Vandeweghe won two singles titles and four doubles titles. In singles, she reached the semifinals of the 2017 Australian Open and 2017 US Open. Vandeweghe announced her retirement in August 2023 and made her last professional appearance at the 2023 San Diego Open.
- (Belgium) Maryna Zanevska joined the professional tour in 2009. She reached career-high rankings of world No. 62 in singles in May 2022 and world No. 86 in doubles in June 2014. She is a one-time WTA singles titleholder and has been runner-up in four additional doubles finals. Zanevska produced her best performances at the Grand Slam tournaments all in 2022. In singles, she reached the second round at both the Australian Open and US Open, and in doubles, she achieved a quarterfinal berth at the French Open. Zanevska announced her retirement on 8 August 2023 after revealing her struggles with chronic back pain and made her last professional appearance at the 2023 US Open.

=== Inactivity ===
- (Kazakhstan) Zarina Diyas became inactive after not playing for more than a year.
- (Romania) Mihaela Buzărnescu became inactive after not playing for more than a year.
- (Romania) Simona Halep became inactive after not playing for more than a year. In September, she further received a four-year ban from tennis after her suspension was upheld.
- (France) Alizé Lim became inactive after not playing for more than a year.
- (Romania) Raluca Olaru became inactive after not playing for more than a year.
- (China) Wang Qiang became inactive after not playing for more than a year.
- (Croatia) Darija Jurak became inactive after not playing for more than a year.
- (Slovenia) Andreja Klepač became inactive after not playing for more than a year.
- (Spain) Garbiñe Muguruza announced in February she was taking an indefinite break from tennis, not competing in any tournaments for the rest of the year. In an interview later in October, she stated that she had "no intention" to return to the WTA Tour, as she was enjoying her hiatus.

Maternity

- (Germany) Angelique Kerber became inactive after not playing for more than a year due to pregnancy.
- (Japan) Naomi Osaka became inactive after not playing for more than a year due to pregnancy.
- (Serbia) Ivana Jorović
- (Poland) Alicja Rosolska

== Comebacks ==
- Margarita Betova came back in February and played her first qualifying matches at the Abu Dhabi Open and at the Dubai Tennis Championships.
- (United States) Jennifer Brady made her comeback in July at ITF 100K Granby.
- Anna Chakvetadze made her comeback in August at ITF 15K Duffel in doubles.
- (Slovenia) Polona Hercog made her comeback in May in the qualification for French Open.
- (Chinese Taipei) Hsieh Su-wei made her comeback in April at the Madrid Open in doubles.
- (Bulgaria) Sesil Karatancheva made her comeback in April at ITF 80K Zaragoza in singles.
- (United States) Varvara Lepchenko made her comeback in May at ITF 15K Málaga in singles.
- (France) Aravane Rezaï made her comeback in July at ITF 60K Montpellier in singles.
- (Czech Republic) Lucie Šafářová made her comeback in October at ITF 25K Reims in singles and doubles, although she did not call it a comeback herself.
- (Latvia) Anastasija Sevastova made her comeback in November at the Creand Andorrà Open in singles.
- (Czech Republic) Barbora Strýcová made her comeback in April at the Madrid Open in singles and doubles.
- (Ukraine) Elina Svitolina made her return to the tour at the Charleston Open in April with a wild card.
- (Denmark) Caroline Wozniacki made her comeback in August at the WTA 1000 tournament in Montreal.
- Vera Zvonareva made her comeback in February and played her first qualifying matches at the Abu Dhabi Open.

== See also ==
- 2023 ATP Tour
- 2023 WTA 125 tournaments
- 2023 ITF Women's World Tennis Tour
- International Tennis Federation
