= 2023 Zhengzhou Open =

- Date: 9–15 October
- Edition: 7th
- Category: WTA 500
- Draw: 28S / 16D
- Prize money: $780,637
- Surface: Hard, outdoor
- Location: Zhengzhou, China
- Venue: Henan Provincial Stadium

Champions

Singles
- (China) Zheng Qinwen

Doubles
- (Canada) Gabriela Dabrowski / (New Zealand) Erin Routliffe
- Zhengzhou Open

The 2023 Bank of Communications Zhengzhou Open was a professional women's tennis tournament played on outdoor hard courts. It was the seventh edition of the tournament and categorized as a WTA 500 tournament on the 2023 WTA Tour. It took place at the Henan Provincial Stadium in Zhengzhou, China from 9 October to 15 October 2023. This was the first edition of the tournament held since 2019, as the intervening editions were canceled due to the COVID-19 pandemic in China.

== Point distribution ==
Event	W	F	SF	QF	Round of 16	Round of 32	Q	Q3	Q2	Q1
Singles	470	305	185	100	55	1	25	18	13	1
Doubles	470	305	185	100	1	—N/a	—N/a	—N/a	—N/a	—N/a

== Champions ==
=== Singles ===
- (China) Zheng Qinwen def. (Czech Republic) Barbora Krejčíková, 2–6, 6–2, 6–4.

This was Zheng's second WTA Tour title.

=== Doubles ===
- (Canada) Gabriela Dabrowski / (New Zealand) Erin Routliffe def. (Japan) Shuko Aoyama / (Japan) Ena Shibahara, 6–2, 6–4

== Singles main-draw entrants ==
=== Seeds ===
Country	Player	Rank^{1}	Seed
~~USA~~	~~Coco Gauff~~	~~3~~	~~1~~
~~KAZ~~	~~Elena Rybakina~~	~~5~~	~~2~~
GRE	Maria Sakkari	6	3
TUN	Ons Jabeur	7	4
~~CZE~~	~~Karolína Muchová~~	~~9~~	~~5~~
FRA	Caroline Garcia	10	6
CZE	Barbora Krejčíková	12	7
	Daria Kasatkina	13	8
	Veronika Kudermetova	16	9
CRO	Donna Vekić	21	10
	Liudmila Samsonova	22	11

- ^{1} Rankings as of 2 October 2023.

=== Other entrants ===
The following players received wildcards into the singles main draw:

- (China) Bai Zhuoxuan
- ~~(United States) Coco Gauff~~
- (China) Guo Hanyu

The following players received entry from the qualifying draw:

- (Japan) Nao Hibino
- (Australia) Ellen Perez
- (Germany) Laura Siegemund
- (Ukraine) Lesia Tsurenko
- (Ukraine) Kateryna Volodko
- Vera Zvonareva

The following players received entry as lucky losers:

- (Hungary) Tímea Babos
- (Germany) Tamara Korpatsch
- Diana Shnaider
- (Japan) Moyuka Uchijima

=== Withdrawals ===
- (Switzerland) Belinda Bencic → replaced by (Ukraine) Anhelina Kalinina
- (United States) Jennifer Brady → replaced by (Hungary) Tímea Babos
- (United States) Coco Gauff → replaced by Diana Shnaider
- (United States) Madison Keys → replaced by (Italy) Jasmine Paolini
- (Czech Republic) Karolína Muchová → replaced by (Japan) Moyuka Uchijima
- (Kazakhstan) Elena Rybakina → replaced by (Germany) Tamara Korpatsch
- (Czech Republic) Markéta Vondroušová → replaced by (Italy) Lucia Bronzetti

== Doubles main-draw entrants ==
=== Seeds ===
Country	Player	Country	Player	Rank^{1}	Seed
CAN	Gabriela Dabrowski	NZL	Erin Routliffe	24	1
USA	Desirae Krawczyk	NED	Demi Schuurs	24	2
JPN	Shuko Aoyama	JPN	Ena Shibahara	31	3
GER	Laura Siegemund		Vera Zvonareva	32	4

- ^{1} Rankings as of 2 October 2023.

=== Other entrants ===
The following pair received a wildcard into the main draw:

- (China) Guo Hanyu / (China) Jiang Xinyu
