= 2023 Qatar Total Open =

- Date: 13–18 February 2023
- Edition: 21st
- Category: WTA 500
- Draw: 28S / 16D
- Prize money: $780,637
- Surface: Hard / outdoor
- Location: Doha, Qatar
- Venue: Khalifa International Tennis and Squash Complex

Champions

Singles
- (Poland) Iga Świątek

Doubles
- (United States) Coco Gauff / (United States) Jessica Pegula
- Qatar Open

The 2023 Qatar Total Open, also known as Qatar TotalEnergies Open, was a professional women's tennis tournament played on outdoor hard courts. It was the 21st edition of the event as a WTA 500 tournament on the 2023 WTA Tour. It took place at the International Tennis and Squash complex in Doha, Qatar, during 13–18 February 2023.

== Finals ==
=== Singles ===
- (Poland) Iga Świątek def. (United States) Jessica Pegula, 6–3, 6–0

=== Doubles ===
- (United States) Coco Gauff / (United States) Jessica Pegula def. (Ukraine) Lyudmyla Kichenok / (Latvia) Jeļena Ostapenko, 6–4, 2–6, [10–7]

== Points and prize money ==
=== Point distribution ===
Event	W	F	SF	QF	Round of 16	Round of 32	Q	Q3	Q2	Q1
Singles	470	305	185	100	55	1	25	18	13	1
Doubles	470	305	185	100	1	—N/a	—N/a	—N/a	—N/a	—N/a

=== Prize money ===
Event	W	F	SF	QF	Round of 16	Round of 32	Q3	Q2	Q1
Singles	$120,150	$74,161	$43,323	$20,465	$11,145	$7,500	$5,590	$2,860	$1,500
Doubles*	$40,100	$24,300	$13,900	$7,200	$5,750	—N/a	—N/a	—N/a	—N/a

_{*per team}

== Singles main-draw entrants ==
=== Seeds ===
Country	Player	Rank^{1}	Seed
POL	Iga Świątek	1	1
USA	Jessica Pegula	4	2
FRA	Caroline Garcia	5	3
USA	Coco Gauff	6	4
GRE	Maria Sakkari	7	5
	Daria Kasatkina	8	6
SUI	Belinda Bencic	9	7
	Veronika Kudermetova	11	8

- ^{1} Rankings are as of February 6, 2023

=== Other entrants ===
The following players received a wildcard into the singles main draw:

- Victoria Azarenka
- (United States) Sofia Kenin
- (Greece) Maria Sakkari
- (Turkey) İpek Öz

The following player received entry using a protected ranking into the singles main draw:

- (Czech Republic) Karolína Muchová

The following player received a special exempt into the main draw:

- (China) Zheng Qinwen

The following players received entry from the qualifying draw:

- (Canada) Rebecca Marino
- (Belgium) Elise Mertens
- (Czech Republic) Karolína Plíšková
- (Bulgaria) Viktoriya Tomova

=== Withdrawals ===
Before the tournament

- (Tunisia) Ons Jabeur → replaced by (Czech Republic) Barbora Krejčíková
- (Estonia) Anett Kontaveit → replaced by (Czech Republic) Karolína Muchová
- Aryna Sabalenka → replaced by (China) Zhang Shuai

During the tournament

- (Switzerland) Belinda Bencic (fatigue)

== Doubles main-draw entrants ==
=== Seeds ===
Country	Player	Country	Player	Rank^{1}	Seed
USA	Coco Gauff	USA	Jessica Pegula	6	1
UKR	Lyudmyla Kichenok	LAT	Jeļena Ostapenko	21	2
USA	Desirae Krawczyk	NED	Demi Schuurs	27	3
MEX	Giuliana Olmos	CHN	Zhang Shuai	34	4

- Rankings are as of February 6, 2023

=== Other entrants ===
The following pairs received wildcards into the doubles main draw:

- (Qatar) Mubaraka Al-Naimi / Ekaterina Yashina
- (Chinese Taipei) Chan Hao-ching / (Chinese Taipei) Latisha Chan

The following pair received entry as alternates:

- Ekaterina Alexandrova / Aliaksandra Sasnovich

=== Withdrawals ===
- Victoria Azarenka / (Belgium) Elise Mertens → replaced by Ekaterina Alexandrova / Aliaksandra Sasnovich
