= Henan Provincial Stadium =

Multi-use stadium in Zhengzhou, China

Coordinates: 34°50′15″N 113°37′22″E

Henan Provincial Sports Centre Stadium (Simplified Chinese: 河南省体育场) is a multi-use stadium in Zhengzhou, China. It was completed in October 2002. It is currently used mostly for football matches athletics, concerts (for Chinese singers) and meets. The stadium has a capacity of 50,000.
