= 2023 Zhengzhou Open – Doubles =

Doubles
- 2023 Zhengzhou Open

Final
- Champions: (Canada) Gabriela Dabrowski (New Zealand) Erin Routliffe
- Runners-up: (Japan) Shuko Aoyama (Japan) Ena Shibahara
- Score: 6–2, 6–4

Events
Singles	Doubles
- Zhengzhou Open

Gabriela Dabrowski and Erin Routliffe defeated Shuko Aoyama and Ena Shibahara in the final, 6–2, 6–4 to win the doubles tennis title at the 2023 Zhengzhou Open.

Nicole Melichar-Martinez and Květa Peschke were the reigning champions from when the event was last held in 2019, but Peschke has since retired from professional tennis. Melichar-Martinez partnered Ellen Perez, but lost in the first round to Tímea Babos and Lyudmyla Kichenok.

== Seeds ==
1. (Canada) Gabriela Dabrowski / (New Zealand) Erin Routliffe (champions)
2. (United States) Desirae Krawczyk / (Netherlands) Demi Schuurs (first round)
3. (Japan) Shuko Aoyama / (Japan) Ena Shibahara (final)
4. (Germany) Laura Siegemund / Vera Zvonareva (first round)

== Draw ==
Key

- Q = Qualifier
- WC = Wild card
- LL = Lucky loser
- Alt = Alternate
- ITF = ITF entry
- PR = Protected ranking
- SR = Special ranking
- SE = Special exempt
- JE = Junior exempt
- JR = Junior Accelerator Programme entrant
- CO = College Accelerator Programme entrant
- NG = Next Gen Accelerator Program entrant
- w/o = Walkover
- r = Retired
- d = Defaulted

=== Draw ===
First round
1	(Canada) G Dabrowski (New Zealand) E Routliffe	6	7^{7}
(Slovakia) T Mihalíková (China) Y Xu	4	6^{2}
(Brazil) I Gamarra Martins (Brazil) L Stefani	6	6
(Ukraine) N Kichenok (Romania) M Niculescu	3	0
4	(Germany) L Siegemund; V Zvonareva	2	6	[4]
WC	(China) H Guo (China) X Jiang	6	2	[10]
(Japan) M Kato (Indonesia) A Sutjiadi	6	6
(Chinese Taipei) H-c Chan (Mexico) G Olmos	3	0
(Colombia) C Osorio; D Shnaider	6	6
(Italy) L Bronzetti (China) L Zhu	1	1
(Chinese Taipei) L Chan (Norway) U Eikeri	6	1	[6]
3	(Japan) S Aoyama (Japan) E Shibahara	4	6	[10]
(Hungary) T Babos (Ukraine) L Kichenok	6	4	[10]
(United States) N Melichar-Martinez (Australia) E Perez	4	6	[6]
V Kudermetova; L Samsonova	6	6
2	(United States) D Krawczyk (Netherlands) D Schuurs	1	2

Quarterfinals
1	(Canada) G Dabrowski (New Zealand) E Routliffe	6	6
(Brazil) I Gamarra Martins (Brazil) L Stefani	2	3
WC	(China) H Guo (China) X Jiang	6	7
(Japan) M Kato (Indonesia) A Sutjiadi	4	5
(Colombia) C Osorio; D Shnaider	6	2	[7]
3	(Japan) S Aoyama (Japan) E Shibahara	3	6	[10]
(Hungary) T Babos (Ukraine) L Kichenok	7^{7}	3	[9]
V Kudermetova; L Samsonova	6^{5}	6	[11]

Semifinals
1	(Canada) G Dabrowski (New Zealand) E Routliffe	6	4	[10]
WC	(China) H Guo (China) X Jiang	2	6	[7]
3	(Japan) S Aoyama (Japan) E Shibahara	6	5	[10]
V Kudermetova; L Samsonova	3	7	[8]

Final
1	(Canada) G Dabrowski (New Zealand) E Routliffe	6	6
3	(Japan) S Aoyama (Japan) E Shibahara	2	4
