= 2023 Birmingham Classic – Doubles =

Doubles
- 2023 Birmingham Classic

Final
- Champions: (Ukraine) Marta Kostyuk (Czech Republic) Barbora Krejčíková
- Runners-up: (Australia) Storm Hunter (United States) Alycia Parks
- Score: 6–2, 7–6^{(9–7)}

Events
| Singles | Doubles |
| ← 2022 · | Birmingham Classic | · 2024 → |

Marta Kostyuk and Barbora Krejčíková defeated Storm Hunter and Alycia Parks in the final, 6–2, 7–6^{(9–7)} to win the doubles tennis title at the 2023 Birmingham Classic.

Lyudmyla Kichenok and Jeļena Ostapenko were the defending champions, but lost in the semifinals to Hunter and Parks.

== Seeds ==
1. (Ukraine) Lyudmyla Kichenok / (Latvia) Jeļena Ostapenko (semifinals)
2. (Ukraine) Marta Kostyuk / (Czech Republic) Barbora Krejčíková (champions)
3. (Australia) Storm Hunter / (United States) Alycia Parks (final)
4. (Czech Republic) Miriam Kolodziejová / (Slovakia) Tereza Mihalíková (first round)

== Draw ==
=== Key ===
- Q = Qualifier
- WC = Wild card
- LL = Lucky loser
- Alt = Alternate
- SE = Special exempt
- PR = Protected ranking
- ITF = ITF entry
- JE = Junior exempt
- w/o = Walkover
- r = Retired
- d = Defaulted
- SR = Special ranking

=== Draw ===
First round
1 | (Ukraine) L Kichenok (Latvia) J Ostapenko | 6 | 6
(Estonia) I Neel (Chinese Taipei) F-h Wu | 3 | 0
WC | (United Kingdom) A Barnett (United Kingdom) O Nicholls | 6 | 2 | [5]
(Norway) U Eikeri; A Panova | 2 | 6 | [10]
3 | (Australia) S Hunter (United States) A Parks | 6 | 6
(Georgia (country)) N Dzalamidze (United States) S Santamaria | 3 | 4
PR | (Chinese Taipei) S-w Hsieh (Czech Republic) B Strýcová | 6 | 6
(Japan) E Hozumi (China) S Zhang | 4 | 1
(Poland) M Linette (United States) B Pera | 6 | 6
(Ukraine) N Kichenok (Poland) A Rosolska | 2 | 3
L Marozava (Brazil) I Gamarra Martins | 7^{7} | 6
4 | (Czech Republic) M Kolodziejová (Slovakia) T Mihalíková | 6^{2} | 4
WC | (United Kingdom) F Christie (United Kingdom) A Collins | 7^{8} | 4 | [10]
(Spain) C Bucșa (Japan) M Ninomiya | 6^{6} | 6 | [7]
(Georgia (country)) O Kalashnikova; I Shymanovich | 7^{7} | 4 | [6]
2 | (Ukraine) M Kostyuk (Czech Republic) B Krejčíková | 6^{4} | 6 | [10]

Quarterfinals
1 | (Ukraine) L Kichenok (Latvia) J Ostapenko | 6 | 6
(Norway) U Eikeri; A Panova | 4 | 1
3 | (Australia) S Hunter (United States) A Parks | 7^{7} | 6
PR | (Chinese Taipei) S-w Hsieh (Czech Republic) B Strýcová | 6^{4} | 4
(Poland) M Linette (United States) B Pera | 6 | 6
L Marozava (Brazil) I Gamarra Martins | 4 | 2
WC | (United Kingdom) F Christie (United Kingdom) A Collins | 3 | 7 | [5]
2 | (Ukraine) M Kostyuk (Czech Republic) B Krejčíková | 6 | 5 | [10]

Semifinals
1 | (Ukraine) L Kichenok (Latvia) J Ostapenko | 5 | 3
3 | (Australia) S Hunter (United States) A Parks | 7 | 6
(Poland) M Linette (United States) B Pera | 3 | 4
2 | (Ukraine) M Kostyuk (Czech Republic) B Krejčíková | 6 | 6

Final
3 | (Australia) S Hunter (United States) A Parks | 2 | 6^{7}
2 | (Ukraine) M Kostyuk (Czech Republic) B Krejčíková | 6 | 7^{9}
