= 2023 Zhengzhou Open – Singles =

Singles
- 2023 Zhengzhou Open

Final
- Champion: (China) Zheng Qinwen
- Runner-up: (Czech Republic) Barbora Krejčíková
- Score: 2–6, 6–2, 6–4

Details
- Draw: 28
- Seeds: 8

Events
Singles	Doubles
- Zhengzhou Open

Zheng Qinwen defeated Barbora Krejčíková in the final, 2–6, 6–2, 6–4 to win the singles tennis title at the 2023 Zhengzhou Open. It was her first WTA 500 title.

Karolína Plíšková was the reigning champion from when the tournament was last held in 2019, but chose not to compete this year.

== Seeds ==
The top four seeds who did not withdraw received a bye into the second round.

1. (United States) Coco Gauff (withdrew)
2. (Kazakhstan) Elena Rybakina (withdrew)
3. (Greece) Maria Sakkari (second round)
4. (Tunisia) Ons Jabeur (quarterfinals, withdrew)
5. (Czech Republic) Karolína Muchová (withdrew)
6. (France) Caroline Garcia (second round)
7. (Czech Republic) Barbora Krejčíková (final)
8. Daria Kasatkina (semifinals)
9. Veronika Kudermetova (first round)
10. (Croatia) Donna Vekić (second round)
11. Liudmila Samsonova (second round)

== Draw ==
Key

- Q = Qualifier
- WC = Wild card
- LL = Lucky loser
- Alt = Alternate
- ITF = ITF entry
- PR = Protected ranking
- SR = Special ranking
- SE = Special exempt
- JE = Junior exempt
- JR = Junior Accelerator Programme entrant
- CO = College Accelerator Programme entrant
- NG = Next Gen Accelerator Program entrant
- w/o = Walkover
- r = Retired
- d = Defaulted

=== Finals ===
Semifinals
7	(Czech Republic) Barbora Krejčíková	6	6
8	Daria Kasatkina	3	0
(China) Zheng Qinwen	6	6
(Italy) Jasmine Paolini	2	3

Final
7	(Czech Republic) Barbora Krejčíková	6	2	4
(China) Zheng Qinwen	2	6	6

=== Top half ===
First round
(Croatia) P Martić	7^{7}	6
(Poland) M Linette	6^{5}	1
Q	(Ukraine) L Tsurenko	6	6
LL	D Shnaider	4	2
Q	(Japan) N Hibino	4	2
10	(Croatia) D Vekić	6	6
(Italy) L Bronzetti	7	6
WC	(China) H Guo	5	1
LL	(Germany) T Korpatsch	6	6^{3}	1
WC	(China) Z Bai	1	7^{7}	6
LL	(Hungary) T Babos	1	6^{7}
8	D Kasatkina	6	7^{9}

Second round
7	(Czech Republic) B Krejčíková	7	6
(Croatia) P Martić	5	1
Q	(Ukraine) L Tsurenko	7^{7}	7^{7}
10	(Croatia) D Vekić	6^{4}	6^{2}
4	(Tunisia) O Jabeur	6	7^{7}
(Italy) L Bronzetti	3	6^{5}
WC	(China) Z Bai	2	4
8	D Kasatkina	6	6

Quarterfinals
7	(Czech Republic) B Krejčíková	6	0
Q	(Ukraine) L Tsurenko	3	0^{r}
4	(Tunisia) O Jabeur
8	D Kasatkina	w/o

Semifinals
7	(Czech Republic) B Krejčíková	6	6
8	D Kasatkina	3	0

=== Bottom half ===
First round
9	V Kudermetova	2	6^{5}
Q	V Zvonareva	6	7^{7}
(Ukraine) A Kalinina	6	6
Q	(Australia) E Perez	1	3
Q	(Ukraine) K Volodko	4	3
(China) Q Zheng	6	6
11	L Samsonova	6	6
(Germany) T Maria	3	3
(China) L Zhu	2	3
Q	(Germany) L Siegemund	6	6
LL	(Japan) M Uchijima	2	3
(Italy) J Paolini	6	6

Second round
Q	V Zvonareva	5	1
(Ukraine) A Kalinina	7	6
(China) Q Zheng	7^{7}	6
3	(Greece) M Sakkari	6^{2}	3
11	L Samsonova	6	2	1
Q	(Germany) L Siegemund	3	6	6
(Italy) J Paolini	3	6	7
6	(France) C Garcia	6	4	5

Quarterfinals
(Ukraine) A Kalinina	3	2
(China) Q Zheng	6	6
Q	(Germany) L Siegemund	0	5
(Italy) J Paolini	6	7

Semifinals
(China) Q Zheng	6	6
(Italy) J Paolini	2	3

== Qualifying ==
=== Seeds ===
1. (Ukraine) Lesia Tsurenko (qualified)
2. Diana Shnaider (qualifying competition, retired, lucky loser)
3. (Italy) Lucia Bronzetti (moved to main draw)
4. (Colombia) Camila Osorio (first round)
5. (Japan) Nao Hibino (qualified)
6. (Germany) Tamara Korpatsch (qualifying competition, lucky loser)
7. (Germany) Laura Siegemund (qualified)
8. (Japan) Moyuka Uchijima (qualifying competition, lucky loser)
9. (Hungary) Tímea Babos (qualifying competition, lucky loser)
10. (China) You Xiaodi (qualifying competition)
11. (China) Ma Yexin (first round)
12. (Canada) Carol Zhao (qualifying competition)

=== Qualifiers ===
1. (Ukraine) Lesia Tsurenko
2. (Germany) Laura Siegemund
3. (Ukraine) Kateryna Volodko
4. Vera Zvonareva
5. (Japan) Nao Hibino
6. (Australia) Ellen Perez

=== Lucky losers ===
1. (Germany) Tamara Korpatsch
2. Diana Shnaider
3. (Japan) Moyuka Uchijima
4. (Hungary) Tímea Babos

=== Qualifying draw ===
==== First qualifier ====
First round
1	(Ukraine) Lesia Tsurenko	6	6
(Norway) Ulrikke Eikeri	3	1
(Georgia (country)) Sofia Shapatava	1	4
8	(Japan) Moyuka Uchijima	6	6

Qualifying competition
1	(Ukraine) Lesia Tsurenko	7	6
8	(Japan) Moyuka Uchijima	5	1

==== Second qualifier ====
First round
2	Diana Shnaider	6	6
WC	(China) Zijun Jiang	0	3
WC	(China) Wang Meiling	1	1
7	(Germany) Laura Siegemund	6	6

Qualifying competition
2	Diana Shnaider	2	0^{r}
7	(Germany) Laura Siegemund	6	3

==== Third qualifier ====
First round
Alt	(New Zealand) Erin Routliffe	3	3
(Ukraine) Kateryna Volodko	6	6
(China) Wei Sijia	1	6	2
10	(China) You Xiaodi	6	4	6

Qualifying competition
(Ukraine) Kateryna Volodko	6	3	6
10	(China) You Xiaodi	4	6	2

==== Fourth qualifier ====
First round
4	(Colombia) Camila Osorio	6	2	2
Vera Zvonareva	1	6	6
(Japan) Miyu Kato	7^{7}	3	4
9	(Hungary) Tímea Babos	6^{2}	6	6

Qualifying competition
Vera Zvonareva	6^{3}	6	7^{7}
9	(Hungary) Tímea Babos	7^{7}	2	6^{5}

==== Fifth qualifier ====
First round
5	(Japan) Nao Hibino	6	6
WC	(China) Zhao Xichen	0	1
WC	(China) Jiang Xinyu	3	6	6^{8}
12	(Canada) Carol Zhao	6	4	7^{10}

Qualifying competition
5	(Japan) Nao Hibino	6	6
12	(Canada) Carol Zhao	3	2

==== Sixth qualifier ====
First round
6	(Germany) Tamara Korpatsch	7	6
(Japan) Ena Shibahara	5	2
(Australia) Ellen Perez	7	6
11	(China) Ma Yexin	5	3

Qualifying competition
6	(Germany) Tamara Korpatsch	4	7	4
(Australia) Ellen Perez	6	5	6
