= 2023 Qatar Total Open – Doubles =

Doubles
- 2023 Qatar Total Open

Final
- Champions: (United States) Coco Gauff (United States) Jessica Pegula
- Runners-up: (Ukraine) Lyudmyla Kichenok (Latvia) Jeļena Ostapenko
- Score: 6–4, 2–6, [10–7]

Details
- Draw: 16
- Seeds: 4

Events
Singles	Doubles
← 2022 ·	Qatar Total Open	· 2024 →

Defending champions Coco Gauff and Jessica Pegula defeated Lyudmyla Kichenok and Jeļena Ostapenko in the final, 6–4, 2–6, [10–7] to win the doubles tennis title at the 2023 WTA Qatar Open.

== Seeds ==
1. (United States) Coco Gauff / (United States) Jessica Pegula (champions)
2. (Ukraine) Lyudmyla Kichenok / (Latvia) Jeļena Ostapenko (final)
3. (United States) Desirae Krawczyk / (Netherlands) Demi Schuurs (first round)
4. (Mexico) Giuliana Olmos / (China) Zhang Shuai (semifinals)

== Draw ==
=== Key ===
- Q = Qualifier
- WC = Wild card
- LL = Lucky loser
- Alt = Alternate
- SE = Special exempt
- PR = Protected ranking
- ITF = ITF entry
- JE = Junior exempt
- w/o = Walkover
- r = Retired
- d = Defaulted
- SR = Special ranking

=== Draw ===
First round
1	(United States) C Gauff (United States) J Pegula	6	6
(Slovakia) T Mihalíková (China) Y Xu	4	0
WC	(Qatar) M Al-Naimi; E Yashina	5	2
(Poland) A Rosolska (New Zealand) E Routliffe	7	6
4	(Mexico) G Olmos (China) S Zhang	7	4	[10]
(Kazakhstan) A Danilina (Brazil) L Stefani	5	6	[7]
(Belgium) K Flipkens (Germany) L Siegemund	4	6	[7]
(Japan) S Aoyama (Japan) M Ninomiya	6	3	[10]
(China) Z Yang; V Zvonareva	6	6
(Czech Republic) M Bouzková (Brazil) B Haddad Maia	4	4
Alt	E Alexandrova; A Sasnovich	7	6
3	(United States) D Krawczyk (Netherlands) D Schuurs	5	3
WC	(Chinese Taipei) H-c Chan (Chinese Taipei) L Chan	7^{7}	1	[12]
(United States) N Melichar-Martinez (Australia) E Perez	6^{5}	6	[10]
(United States) S Kenin (Czech Republic) K Muchová	3	6^{3}
2	(Ukraine) L Kichenok (Latvia) J Ostapenko	6	7^{7}

Quarterfinals
1	(United States) C Gauff (United States) J Pegula	6	7^{7}
(Poland) A Rosolska (New Zealand) E Routliffe	2	6^{3}
4	(Mexico) G Olmos (China) S Zhang	6	6
(Japan) S Aoyama (Japan) M Ninomiya	0	4
(China) Z Yang; V Zvonareva	4	7^{7}	[10]
Alt	E Alexandrova; A Sasnovich	6	6^{2}	[7]
WC	(Chinese Taipei) H-c Chan (Chinese Taipei) L Chan	5	1
2	(Ukraine) L Kichenok (Latvia) J Ostapenko	7	6

Semifinals
1	(United States) C Gauff (United States) J Pegula	6	6
4	(Mexico) G Olmos (China) S Zhang	1	3
(China) Z Yang; V Zvonareva	6	3	[6]
2	(Ukraine) L Kichenok (Latvia) J Ostapenko	1	6	[10]

Final
1	(United States) C Gauff (United States) J Pegula	6	2	[10]
2	(Ukraine) L Kichenok (Latvia) J Ostapenko	4	6	[7]
