= 2023 Korea Open – Doubles =

Doubles
- 2023 Korea Open

Final
- Champions: (Czech Republic) Marie Bouzková (United States) Bethanie Mattek-Sands
- Runners-up: (Thailand) Luksika Kumkhum (Thailand) Peangtarn Plipuech
- Score: 6–2, 6–1

Details
- Draw: 16
- Seeds: 4

Events
| Singles | Doubles |
- Korea Open

Marie Bouzková and Bethanie Mattek-Sands defeated Luksika Kumkhum and Peangtarn Plipuech in the final, 6–2, 6–1 to win the doubles tennis title at the 2023 Korea Open.

Kristina Mladenovic and Yanina Wickmayer were the reigning champions, but did not participate this year.

== Seeds ==
1. (Japan) Eri Hozumi / (Japan) Makoto Ninomiya (quarterfinals)
2. (Czech Republic) Marie Bouzková / (United States) Bethanie Mattek-Sands (champions)
3. Irina Khromacheva / (Chinese Taipei) Wu Fang-hsien (semifinals)
4. (United States) Sabrina Santamaria / Yana Sizikova (first round)

== Draw ==
Key

- Q = Qualifier
- WC = Wild card
- LL = Lucky loser
- Alt = Alternate
- ITF = ITF entry
- PR = Protected ranking
- SR = Special ranking
- SE = Special exempt
- JE = Junior exempt
- JR = Junior Accelerator Programme entrant
- CO = College Accelerator Programme entrant
- NG = Next Gen Accelerator Program entrant
- w/o = Walkover
- r = Retired
- d = Defaulted

=== Draw ===
First round
1 | (Japan) E Hozumi (Japan) M Ninomiya | 3 | 6 | [10]
(United States) Q Gleason (Brazil) L Pigossi | 6 | 4 | [3]
(United States) S Kenin (United States) A Parks | 6 | 6
(Kazakhstan) Z Kulambayeva (India) P Thombare | 1 | 4
4 | (United States) S Santamaria; Y Sizikova | 3 | 6 | [9]
(United States) K Day (United States) C Liu | 6 | 2 | [11]
(Indonesia) B Gumulya (Indonesia) J Rompies | 5 | 6 | [4]
(Thailand) L Kumkhum (Thailand) P Plipuech | 7 | 1 | [10]
(Netherlands) A Hartono (Australia) O Tjandramulia | 5 | 6 | [6]
WC | (South Korea) J-h Choi (South Korea) S-h Park | 7 | 4 | [10]
Alt | (Chinese Taipei) E-s Liang (China) Y Yuan | 4 | 4
3 | I Khromacheva (Chinese Taipei) F-h Wu | 6 | 6
(South Korea) N-l Han (South Korea) S-j Jang | 6 | 4 | [7]
(United States) E Bektas (Australia) K Birrell | 4 | 6 | [10]
WC | (South Korea) D-y Back (South Korea) B-y Jeong | 0 | 2
2 | (Czech Republic) M Bouzková (United States) B Mattek-Sands | 6 | 6

Quarterfinals
1 | (Japan) E Hozumi (Japan) M Ninomiya | 6 | 6^{2} | [6]
(United States) S Kenin (United States) A Parks | 4 | 7^{7} | [10]
(United States) K Day (United States) C Liu | 6 | 4 | [6]
(Thailand) L Kumkhum (Thailand) P Plipuech | 3 | 6 | [10]
WC | (South Korea) J-h Choi (South Korea) S-h Park | 2 | 1
3 | I Khromacheva (Chinese Taipei) F-h Wu | 6 | 6
(United States) E Bektas (Australia) K Birrell | 6 | 3 | [2]
2 | (Czech Republic) M Bouzková (United States) B Mattek-Sands | 4 | 6 | [10]

Semifinals
(United States) S Kenin (United States) A Parks | 5 | 6^{3}
(Thailand) L Kumkhum (Thailand) P Plipuech | 7 | 7^{7}
3 | I Khromacheva (Chinese Taipei) F-h Wu | 3 | 1
2 | (Czech Republic) M Bouzková (United States) B Mattek-Sands | 6 | 6

Final
(Thailand) L Kumkhum (Thailand) P Plipuech | 2 | 1
2 | (Czech Republic) M Bouzková (United States) B Mattek-Sands | 6 | 6
