= 2023 Iga Świątek tennis season =

2023 tennis player season

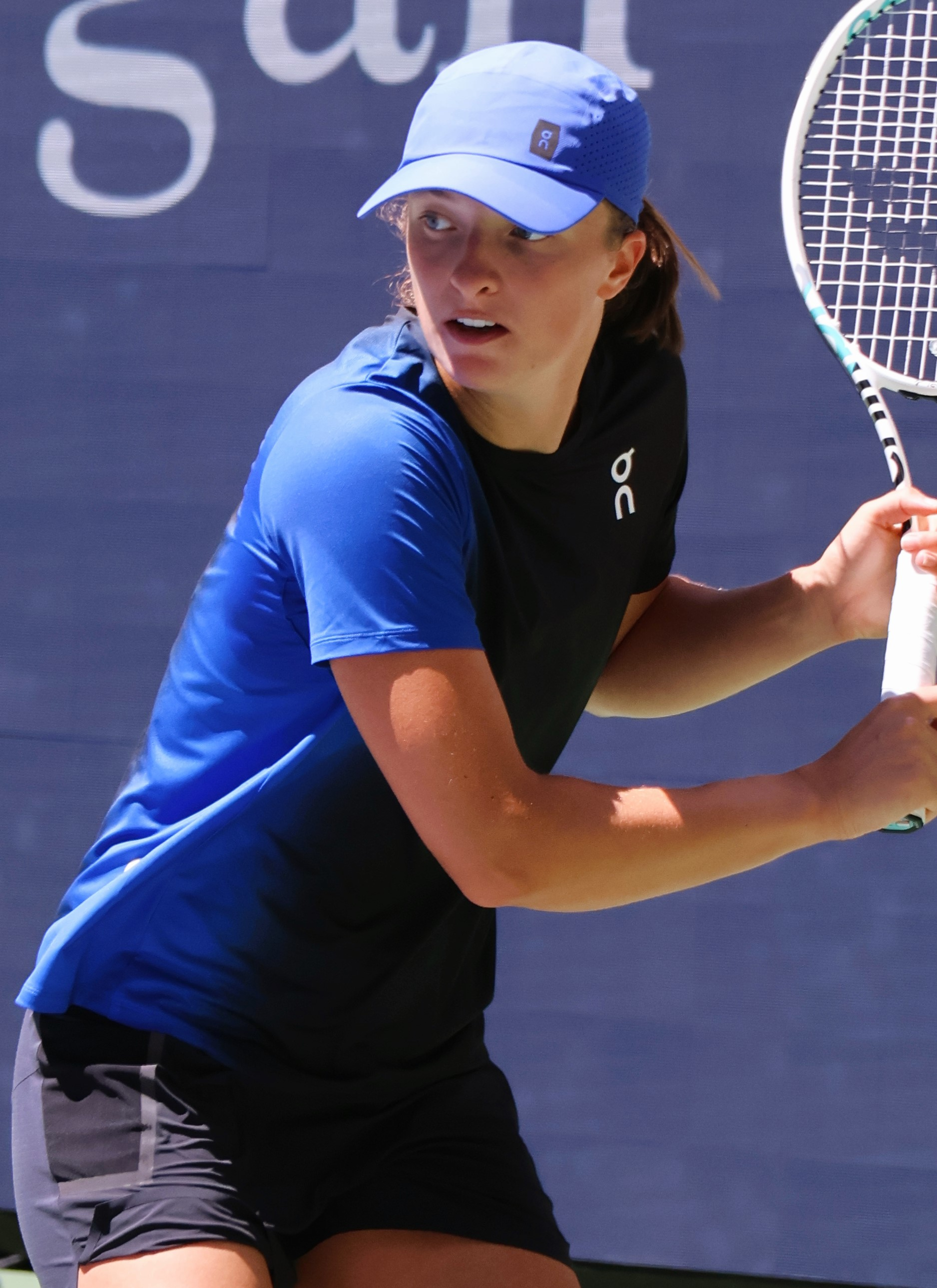
- Swiatek practicing at the 2023 US Open
- Full name: Iga Świątek
- Country: Poland
- Calendar prize money: $9,857,686

Singles
- Season record: 68–11 (86%)
- Calendar titles: 6
- Year-end ranking: No. 1
- Ranking change from previous year: Steady

Grand Slam & significant results
- Australian Open: 4R
- French Open: W
- Wimbledon: QF
- US Open: 4R
- Championships: W

Mixed doubles
- Season record: 2–0

Injuries
- Injuries: Rib injury
- Last updated on: 7 November 2023.

The 2023 Iga Świątek tennis season officially began on 31 December 2022 as the start of the 2023 WTA Tour. Iga Świątek entered the season as the world number 1 player in singles for the first time in her career.

== Season summary ==
=== Early hard court season ===
Świątek started 2023 as only the fourth woman in WTA history to be ranked world No. 1 for 40 or more consecutive weeks in their first stint as the top-ranked player. In her first tournament of the year representing Poland at the United Cup in Brisbane, Świątek defeated Yulia Putintseva, Belinda Bencic and Martina Trevisan on the way to the semifinals where she lost to Jessica Pegula in straight sets. At the 2023 Australian Open, the top seeded Świątek reached the fourth round after winning against Jule Niemeier, Camila Osorio and Cristina Bucșa. In the fourth round she was defeated by reigning Wimbledon champion Elena Rybakina in straight sets.

=== Middle East tournament and Sunshine Double ===
In February 2023, Świątek successfully defended her title at the WTA 500 Qatar Ladies Open when she defeated Jessica Pegula in the final in straight sets. This was her first title of the year and the twelfth of her career. She did not drop a set throughout the tournament and only lost five games. At the Dubai Championships, she defeated Leylah Fernandez, 14th seed Liudmila Samsonova, Karolína Plíšková (by walkover) and fifth seed Coco Gauff, all matches in straight sets with only nine games lost, to reach the final. She lost to Barbora Krejčíková in straight sets, ending her six match winning streak.

On 13 March she reached her 50th consecutive week at world No. 1. At the Indian Wells Open she defeated Bianca Andreescu and Emma Raducanu in rounds three and four, both in straight sets. However, she lost once again to Elena Rybakina in the semifinals, preventing Świątek from defending her Indian Wells title. Due to a rib injury suffered during the Indian Wells event, Świątek withdrew from the 2023 Miami Open, which also prevented her from defending her Miami Open title.

=== Mid-year clay season ===
At the Stuttgart Open in April, Świątek entered the tournament as the defending champion. She reached her third WTA final of the season by defeating Zheng Qinwen, Karolína Plíšková and Ons Jabeur (retired). In the final, she defeated world No. 2, Aryna Sabalenka, in straight sets in claiming her 13th career singles title. At the Madrid Open she reached the quarterfinals for the first time at this tournament defeating 16th seed Ekaterina Alexandrova. In the finals, she lost to Aryna Sabalenka in a rematch of the 2023 Stuttgart Open.

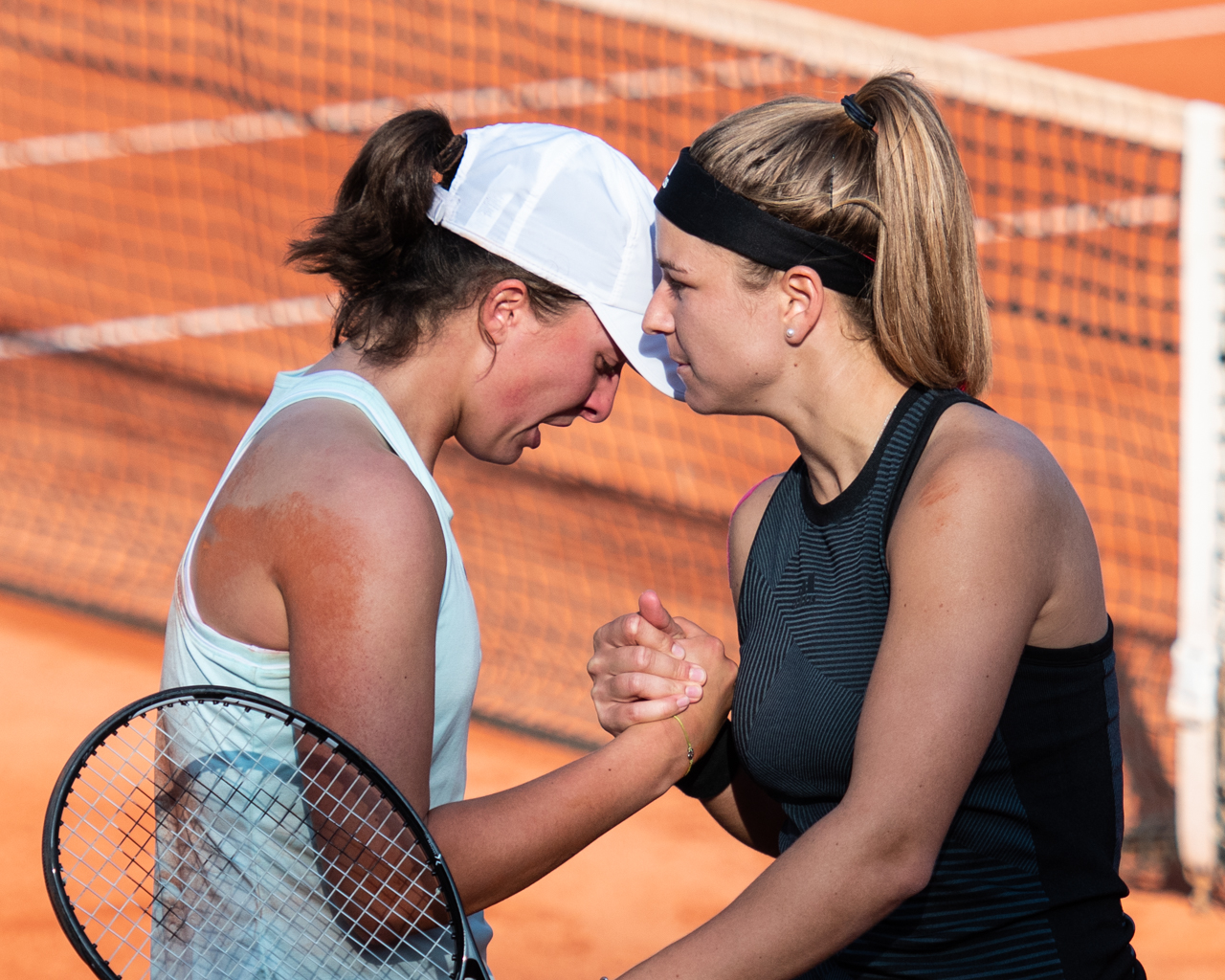
Świątek defeated Karolína Muchová to win her third French Open title in 2023.

In May, Świątek entered the Italian Open as the defending champion. In the second round, she doubled-bageled Anastasia Pavlyuchenkova before defeating Lesia Tsurenko and Donna Vekić in the following rounds. In the quarterfinals, she faced Elena Rybakina and was forced to retire in the third set after sustaining a right thigh injury. At the French Open, Świątek reached her fourth major final without dropping a set. She won her third French Open and fourth major title overall, defeating Karolína Muchová in three sets in the final. She also became the first woman to defend the title since Justine Henin in 2007.

=== Grass court season and home event ===
At the Wimbledon, Świątek reached her first ever quarterfinal at the tournament after eliminating Zhu Lin, Sara Sorribes Tormo, Petra Martić and Belinda Bencic. In the quarterfinal, she lost to Elina Svitolina in three sets, which ended her 14-match win streak.

In July, Swiatek competed in the Poland Open and reached the final after achieving victories over Nigina Abduraimova, Claire Liu, Linda Nosková and Yanina Wickmayer. In the final, she defeated Laura Siegemund claiming her first WTA 250 title and 15th overall.

=== US Open series ===
In preparation for the Canadian Open, Świątek was seen practicing with her mouth taped shut. She explained that this was a breathing exercise she did to improve endurance. She reached the semifinals at the event losing to Jessica Pegula, in three sets.

At the Cincinnati Open, Świątek defeated Danielle Collins, Zheng Qinwen, and the reigning Wimbledon champion, Markéta Vondroušová, before being upset for the first time by Coco Gauff in the semifinals.

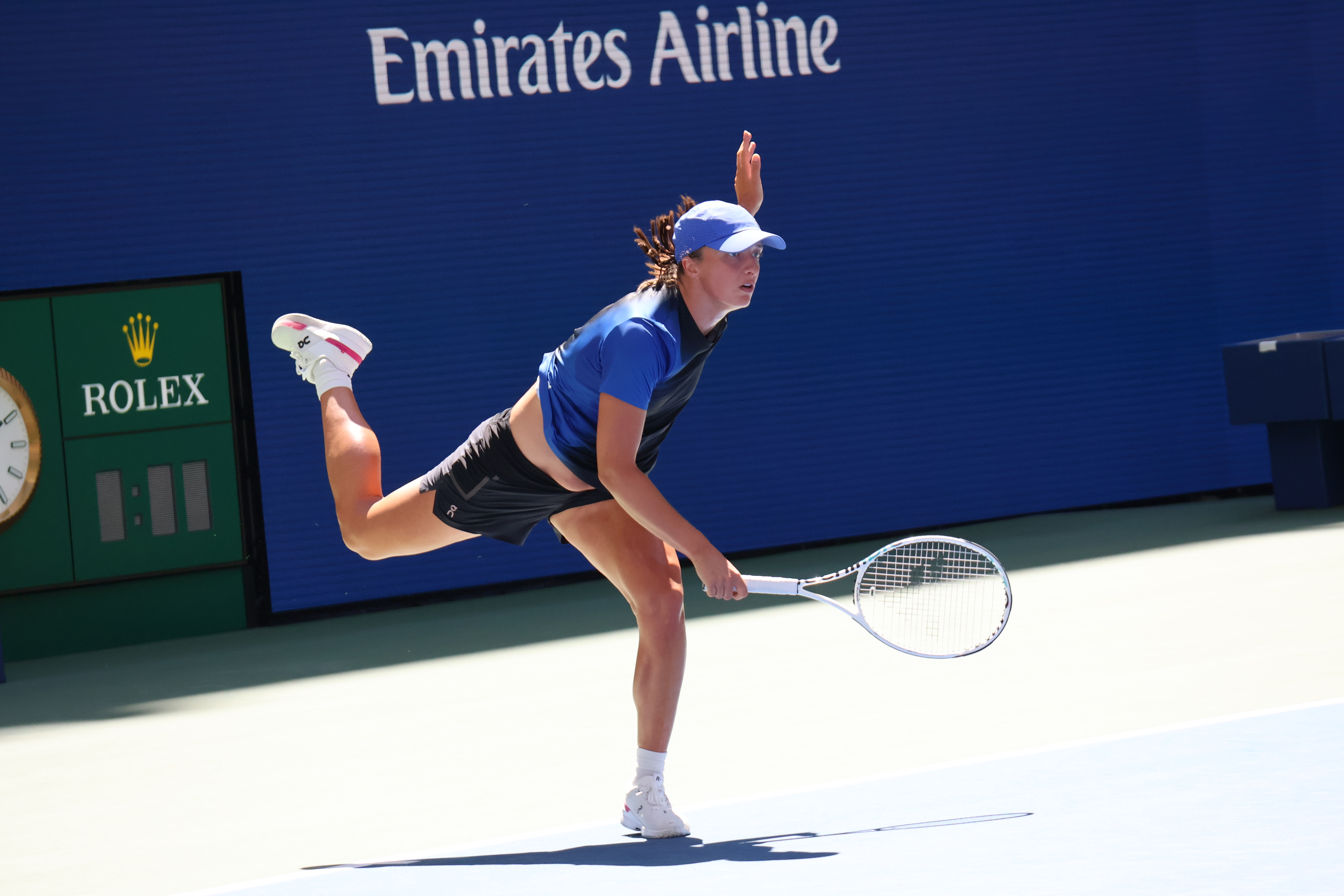
Świątek at the 2023 US Open.

At the US Open, Świątek began her title defense with convincing victories in the first three rounds. However, in the fourth round she was upset by 20th seed Jeļena Ostapenko, in three sets, and consequently ceded the world No. 1 ranking to Aryna Sabalenka, ending her 75-week streak in the top position. Świątek’s 75-week reign at No.1 is the third-longest streak among players in their first stint as the top player behind only Steffi Graf and Martina Hingis. On 25 September, Świątek began her 100th consecutive week in the top 10 of WTA ranking becoming the second Pole (after Agnieszka Radwańska) to achieve this milestone.

=== Closing tournaments ===
She reached her third WTA 1000 final and seventh overall for the season at the China Open, defeating third seed Coco Gauff ending her 16-match win streak. She won her fifth title of the season and 16th overall with a straight sets win over Liudmila Samsonova.

She won the 2023 WTA Finals defeating Jessica Pegula in straight sets in under an hour and returned to year-end World No. 1 for a second consecutive year. It was her 68th match win of the season. She became the first woman since Serena Williams in 2012 to win the title without dropping a set.

== All matches ==
Key
| W | F | SF | QF | #R | RR | Q# | P# | DNQ | A | Z# | PO | G | S | B | NMS | NTI | P | NH |

(W) winner; (F) finalist; (SF) semifinalist; (QF) quarterfinalist; (#R) rounds 4, 3, 2, 1; (RR) round-robin stage; (Q#) qualification round; (P#) preliminary round; (DNQ) did not qualify; (A) absent; (Z#) Davis/Fed Cup Zonal Group (with number indication) or (PO) play-off; (G) gold, (S) silver or (B) bronze Olympic/Paralympic medal; (NMS) not a Masters tournament; (NTI) not a Tier I tournament; (P) postponed; (NH) not held; (SR) strike rate (events won / competed); (W–L) win–loss record.
To avoid confusion and double counting, these charts are updated at the conclusion of a tournament or when the player's participation has ended.

=== Singles matches ===
| Tournament | Match | Round | Opponent | Rank | Result | Score |
|---|---|---|---|---|---|---|
| United Cup; Brisbane/Perth/Sydney, Australia; United Cup; Hard, outdoor; 29 December 2022 – 8 January 2023 | 1 | RR | (Kazakhstan) Yulia Putintseva | 51 | Win | 6–1, 6–3 |
| United Cup; Brisbane/Perth/Sydney, Australia; United Cup; Hard, outdoor; 29 December 2022 – 8 January 2023 | 2 | RR | (Switzerland) Belinda Bencic | 12 | Win | 6–3, 7–6^{(7–3)} |
| United Cup; Brisbane/Perth/Sydney, Australia; United Cup; Hard, outdoor; 29 December 2022 – 8 January 2023 | 3 | HF | (Italy) Martina Trevisan | 27 | Win | 6–2, 6–4 |
| United Cup; Brisbane/Perth/Sydney, Australia; United Cup; Hard, outdoor; 29 December 2022 – 8 January 2023 | 4 | SF | (United States) Jessica Pegula | 3 | Loss | 2–6, 2–6 |
| Australian Open; Melbourne, Australia; Grand Slam; Hard, outdoor; 16 January 2023 – 29 January 2023 | 5 | 1R | (Germany) Jule Niemeier | 69 | Win | 6–4, 7–5 |
| Australian Open; Melbourne, Australia; Grand Slam; Hard, outdoor; 16 January 2023 – 29 January 2023 | 6 | 2R | (Colombia) Camila Osorio | 84 | Win | 6–2, 6–3 |
| Australian Open; Melbourne, Australia; Grand Slam; Hard, outdoor; 16 January 2023 – 29 January 2023 | 7 | 3R | (Spain) Cristina Bucșa (Q) | 100 | Win | 6–0, 6–1 |
| Australian Open; Melbourne, Australia; Grand Slam; Hard, outdoor; 16 January 2023 – 29 January 2023 | 8 | 4R | (Kazakhstan) Elena Rybakina (22) | 25 | Loss | 4–6, 4–6 |
| Qatar Open; Doha, Qatar; WTA 500; Hard, outdoor; 13 February 2023 – 19 February 2023 | – | 1R | Bye | | | |
| Qatar Open; Doha, Qatar; WTA 500; Hard, outdoor; 13 February 2023 – 19 February 2023 | 9 | 2R | (United States) Danielle Collins | 42 | Win | 6–0, 6–1 |
| Qatar Open; Doha, Qatar; WTA 500; Hard, outdoor; 13 February 2023 – 19 February 2023 | – | QF | (Switzerland) Belinda Bencic (7) | 9 | Walkover | —N/a |
| Qatar Open; Doha, Qatar; WTA 500; Hard, outdoor; 13 February 2023 – 19 February 2023 | 10 | SF | Veronika Kudermetova (Note: Russian and Belarus players are not allowed to compete under the name or flag of their country following the Russian invasion of Ukraine.) (8) | 11 | Win | 6–0, 6–1 |
| Qatar Open; Doha, Qatar; WTA 500; Hard, outdoor; 13 February 2023 – 19 February 2023 | 11 | W | (United States) Jessica Pegula (2) | 4 | Win (1) | 6–3, 6–0 |
| Dubai Tennis Championships; Dubai, United Arab Emirates; WTA 1000; Hard, outdoor; 20 February 2023 – 26 February 2023 | – | 1R | Bye | | | |
| Dubai Tennis Championships; Dubai, United Arab Emirates; WTA 1000; Hard, outdoor; 20 February 2023 – 26 February 2023 | 12 | 2R | (Canada) Leylah Fernandez | 37 | Win | 6–1, 6–1 |
| Dubai Tennis Championships; Dubai, United Arab Emirates; WTA 1000; Hard, outdoor; 20 February 2023 – 26 February 2023 | 13 | 3R | Liudmila Samsonova (14) | 13 | Win | 6–1, 6–0 |
| Dubai Tennis Championships; Dubai, United Arab Emirates; WTA 1000; Hard, outdoor; 20 February 2023 – 26 February 2023 | – | QF | (Czech Republic) Karolína Plíšková | 18 | Walkover | —N/a |
| Dubai Tennis Championships; Dubai, United Arab Emirates; WTA 1000; Hard, outdoor; 20 February 2023 – 26 February 2023 | 14 | SF | (United States) Coco Gauff (5) | 6 | Win | 6–4, 6–2 |
| Dubai Tennis Championships; Dubai, United Arab Emirates; WTA 1000; Hard, outdoor; 20 February 2023 – 26 February 2023 | 15 | F | (Czech Republic) Barbora Krejčíková | 30 | Loss | 4–6, 2–6 |
| Indian Wells Open; Indian Wells, United States; WTA 1000; Hard, outdoor; 6 March 2023 – 19 March 2023 | – | 1R | Bye | | | |
| Indian Wells Open; Indian Wells, United States; WTA 1000; Hard, outdoor; 6 March 2023 – 19 March 2023 | 16 | 2R | (United States) Claire Liu | 56 | Win | 6–0, 6–1 |
| Indian Wells Open; Indian Wells, United States; WTA 1000; Hard, outdoor; 6 March 2023 – 19 March 2023 | 17 | 3R | (Canada) Bianca Andreescu (32) | 36 | Win | 6–3, 7–6^{(7–1)} |
| Indian Wells Open; Indian Wells, United States; WTA 1000; Hard, outdoor; 6 March 2023 – 19 March 2023 | 18 | 4R | (United Kingdom) Emma Raducanu | 77 | Win | 6–3, 6–1 |
| Indian Wells Open; Indian Wells, United States; WTA 1000; Hard, outdoor; 6 March 2023 – 19 March 2023 | 19 | QF | (Romania) Sorana Cîrstea | 83 | Win | 6–2, 6–3 |
| Indian Wells Open; Indian Wells, United States; WTA 1000; Hard, outdoor; 6 March 2023 – 19 March 2023 | 20 | SF | (Kazakhstan) Elena Rybakina (10) | 10 | Loss | 2–6, 2–6 |
| Stuttgart Open; Stuttgart, Germany; WTA 500; Clay, indoor; 17 April 2023 – 23 April 2023 | – | 1R | Bye | | | |
| Stuttgart Open; Stuttgart, Germany; WTA 500; Clay, indoor; 17 April 2023 – 23 April 2023 | 21 | 2R | (China) Zheng Qinwen | 25 | Win | 6–1, 6–4 |
| Stuttgart Open; Stuttgart, Germany; WTA 500; Clay, indoor; 17 April 2023 – 23 April 2023 | 22 | QF | (Czech Republic) Karolína Plíšková | 17 | Win | 4–6, 6–1, 6–2 |
| Stuttgart Open; Stuttgart, Germany; WTA 500; Clay, indoor; 17 April 2023 – 23 April 2023 | 23 | SF | (Tunisia) Ons Jabeur (3) | 4 | Win | 3–0, ret. |
| Stuttgart Open; Stuttgart, Germany; WTA 500; Clay, indoor; 17 April 2023 – 23 April 2023 | 24 | W | Aryna Sabalenka (2) | 2 | Win (2) | 6–3, 6–4 |
| Madrid Open; Madrid, Spain; WTA 1000; Clay, outdoor; 25 April 2023 – 7 May 2023 | – | 1R | Bye | | | |
| Madrid Open; Madrid, Spain; WTA 1000; Clay, outdoor; 25 April 2023 – 7 May 2023 | 25 | 2R | (Austria) Julia Grabher (LL) | 92 | Win | 6–3, 6–2 |
| Madrid Open; Madrid, Spain; WTA 1000; Clay, outdoor; 25 April 2023 – 7 May 2023 | 26 | 3R | (United States) Bernarda Pera (28) | 32 | Win | 6–3, 6–2 |
| Madrid Open; Madrid, Spain; WTA 1000; Clay, outdoor; 25 April 2023 – 7 May 2023 | 27 | 4R | Ekaterina Alexandrova (16) | 17 | Win | 6–4, 6–7^{(3–7)}, 6–3 |
| Madrid Open; Madrid, Spain; WTA 1000; Clay, outdoor; 25 April 2023 – 7 May 2023 | 28 | QF | (Croatia) Petra Martić (27) | 33 | Win | 6–0, 6–3 |
| Madrid Open; Madrid, Spain; WTA 1000; Clay, outdoor; 25 April 2023 – 7 May 2023 | 29 | SF | Veronika Kudermetova (12) | 13 | Win | 6–1, 6–1 |
| Madrid Open; Madrid, Spain; WTA 1000; Clay, outdoor; 25 April 2023 – 7 May 2023 | 30 | F | Aryna Sabalenka (2) | 2 | Loss | 3–6, 6–3, 3–6 |
| Italian Open; Rome, Italy; WTA 1000; Clay, outdoor; 9 May 2023 – 21 May 2023 | – | 1R | Bye | | | |
| Italian Open; Rome, Italy; WTA 1000; Clay, outdoor; 9 May 2023 – 21 May 2023 | 31 | 2R | Anastasia Pavlyuchenkova (PR) | 506 | Win | 6–0, 6–0 |
| Italian Open; Rome, Italy; WTA 1000; Clay, outdoor; 9 May 2023 – 21 May 2023 | 32 | 3R | (Ukraine) Lesia Tsurenko | 68 | Win | 6–2, 6–0 |
| Italian Open; Rome, Italy; WTA 1000; Clay, outdoor; 9 May 2023 – 21 May 2023 | 33 | 4R | (Croatia) Donna Vekić (21) | 24 | Win | 6–3, 6–4 |
| Italian Open; Rome, Italy; WTA 1000; Clay, outdoor; 9 May 2023 – 21 May 2023 | 34 | QF | (Kazakhstan) Elena Rybakina (7) | 6 | Loss | 6–2, 6–7^{(3–7)}, 2–2, ret. |
| French Open; Paris, France; Grand Slam; Clay, outdoor; 28 May 2023 – 11 June 2023 | 35 | 1R | (Spain) Cristina Bucșa | 69 | Win | 6–4, 6–0 |
| French Open; Paris, France; Grand Slam; Clay, outdoor; 28 May 2023 – 11 June 2023 | 36 | 2R | (United States) Claire Liu | 102 | Win | 6–4, 6–0 |
| French Open; Paris, France; Grand Slam; Clay, outdoor; 28 May 2023 – 11 June 2023 | 37 | 3R | (China) Wang Xinyu | 80 | Win | 6–0, 6–0 |
| French Open; Paris, France; Grand Slam; Clay, outdoor; 28 May 2023 – 11 June 2023 | 38 | 4R | (Ukraine) Lesia Tsurenko | 66 | Win | 5–1, ret. |
| French Open; Paris, France; Grand Slam; Clay, outdoor; 28 May 2023 – 11 June 2023 | 39 | QF | (United States) Coco Gauff (6) | 6 | Win | 6–4, 6–2 |
| French Open; Paris, France; Grand Slam; Clay, outdoor; 28 May 2023 – 11 June 2023 | 40 | SF | (Brazil) Beatriz Haddad Maia (14) | 12 | Win | 6–2, 7–6^{(9–7)} |
| French Open; Paris, France; Grand Slam; Clay, outdoor; 28 May 2023 – 11 June 2023 | 41 | W | (Czech Republic) Karolína Muchová | 43 | Win (3) | 6–2, 5–7, 6–4 |
| Bad Homburg Open; Bad Homburg, Germany; WTA 250; Grass, outdoor; 25 June 2023 – 1 July 2023 | 42 | 1R | (Germany) Tatjana Maria | 66 | Win | 5–7, 6–2, 6–0 |
| Bad Homburg Open; Bad Homburg, Germany; WTA 250; Grass, outdoor; 25 June 2023 – 1 July 2023 | 43 | 2R | (Switzerland) Jil Teichmann (Q) | 129 | Win | 6–3, 6–1 |
| Bad Homburg Open; Bad Homburg, Germany; WTA 250; Grass, outdoor; 25 June 2023 – 1 July 2023 | 44 | QF | Anna Blinkova (9) | 39 | Win | 6–3, 6–2 |
| Bad Homburg Open; Bad Homburg, Germany; WTA 250; Grass, outdoor; 25 June 2023 – 1 July 2023 | – | SF | (Italy) Lucia Bronzetti | 65 | Withdrew | —N/a |
| Wimbledon; London, United Kingdom; Grand Slam; Grass, outdoor; 3 July 2023 – 16 July 2023 | 45 | 1R | (China) Zhu Lin | 34 | Win | 6–1, 6–3 |
| Wimbledon; London, United Kingdom; Grand Slam; Grass, outdoor; 3 July 2023 – 16 July 2023 | 46 | 2R | (Spain) Sara Sorribes Tormo (PR) | 84 | Win | 6–2, 6–0 |
| Wimbledon; London, United Kingdom; Grand Slam; Grass, outdoor; 3 July 2023 – 16 July 2023 | 47 | 3R | (Croatia) Petra Martić (30) | 29 | Win | 6–2, 7–5 |
| Wimbledon; London, United Kingdom; Grand Slam; Grass, outdoor; 3 July 2023 – 16 July 2023 | 48 | 4R | (Switzerland) Belinda Bencic (14) | 14 | Win | 6–7^{(4–7)}, 7–6^{(7–2)}, 6–3 |
| Wimbledon; London, United Kingdom; Grand Slam; Grass, outdoor; 3 July 2023 – 16 July 2023 | 49 | QF | (Ukraine) Elina Svitolina (WC) | 76 | Loss | 5–7, 7–6^{(7–5)}, 2–6 |
| Poland Open; Warsaw, Poland; WTA 250; Hard, outdoor; 24 July 2023 – 30 July 2023 | 50 | 1R | (Uzbekistan) Nigina Abduraimova | 181 | Win | 6–4, 6–3 |
| Poland Open; Warsaw, Poland; WTA 250; Hard, outdoor; 24 July 2023 – 30 July 2023 | 51 | 2R | (United States) Claire Liu | 78 | Win | 6–2, 6–2 |
| Poland Open; Warsaw, Poland; WTA 250; Hard, outdoor; 24 July 2023 – 30 July 2023 | 52 | QF | (Czech Republic) Linda Nosková (8) | 59 | Win | 6–1, 6–4 |
| Poland Open; Warsaw, Poland; WTA 250; Hard, outdoor; 24 July 2023 – 30 July 2023 | 53 | SF | (Belgium) Yanina Wickmayer | 109 | Win | 6–1, 7–6^{(8–6)} |
| Poland Open; Warsaw, Poland; WTA 250; Hard, outdoor; 24 July 2023 – 30 July 2023 | 54 | W | (Germany) Laura Siegemund | 153 | Win (4) | 6–0, 6–1 |
| Canadian Open; Montréal, Canada; WTA 1000; Hard, outdoor; 7 August 2023 – 13 August 2023 | – | 1R | Bye | | | |
| Canadian Open; Montréal, Canada; WTA 1000; Hard, outdoor; 7 August 2023 – 13 August 2023 | 55 | 2R | (Czech Republic) Karolína Plíšková | 23 | Win | 7–6^{(8–6)}, 6–2 |
| Canadian Open; Montréal, Canada; WTA 1000; Hard, outdoor; 7 August 2023 – 13 August 2023 | 56 | 3R | (Czech Republic) Karolína Muchová (14) | 17 | Win | 6–1, 4–6, 6–4 |
| Canadian Open; Montréal, Canada; WTA 1000; Hard, outdoor; 7 August 2023 – 13 August 2023 | 57 | QF | (United States) Danielle Collins (Q) | 48 | Win | 6–3, 4–6, 6–2 |
| Canadian Open; Montréal, Canada; WTA 1000; Hard, outdoor; 7 August 2023 – 13 August 2023 | 58 | SF | (United States) Jessica Pegula (4) | 3 | Loss | 2–6, 7–6^{(7–4)}, 4–6 |
| Cincinnati Open; Mason, United States; WTA 1000; Hard, outdoor; 13 August 2023 – 20 August 2023 | – | 1R | Bye | | | |
| Cincinnati Open; Mason, United States; WTA 1000; Hard, outdoor; 13 August 2023 – 20 August 2023 | 59 | 2R | (United States) Danielle Collins (WC) | 34 | Win | 6–1, 6–0 |
| Cincinnati Open; Mason, United States; WTA 1000; Hard, outdoor; 13 August 2023 – 20 August 2023 | 60 | 3R | (China) Zheng Qinwen | 24 | Win | 3–6, 6–1, 6–1 |
| Cincinnati Open; Mason, United States; WTA 1000; Hard, outdoor; 13 August 2023 – 20 August 2023 | 61 | QF | (Czech Republic) Markéta Vondroušová (10) | 10 | Win | 7–6^{(7–3)}, 6–1 |
| Cincinnati Open; Mason, United States; WTA 1000; Hard, outdoor; 13 August 2023 – 20 August 2023 | 62 | SF | (United States) Coco Gauff (7) | 7 | Loss | 6–7^{(2–7)}, 6–3, 4–6 |
| US Open; New York City, United States; Grand Slam; Hard, outdoor; 28 August 2023 – 10 September 2023 | 63 | 1R | (Sweden) Rebecca Peterson | 86 | Win | 6–0, 6–1 |
| US Open; New York City, United States; Grand Slam; Hard, outdoor; 28 August 2023 – 10 September 2023 | 64 | 2R | (Australia) Daria Saville (PR) | 322 | Win | 6–3, 6–4 |
| US Open; New York City, United States; Grand Slam; Hard, outdoor; 28 August 2023 – 10 September 2023 | 65 | 3R | (Slovenia) Kaja Juvan (Q) | 145 | Win | 6–0, 6–1 |
| US Open; New York City, United States; Grand Slam; Hard, outdoor; 28 August 2023 – 10 September 2023 | 66 | 4R | (Latvia) Jeļena Ostapenko (20) | 21 | Loss | 6–3, 3–6, 1–6 |
| Pan Pacific Open; Tokyo, Japan; WTA 500; Hard, outdoor; 25 September 2023 – 1 October 2023 | – | 1R | Bye | | | |
| Pan Pacific Open; Tokyo, Japan; WTA 500; Hard, outdoor; 25 September 2023 – 1 October 2023 | 67 | 2R | (Japan) Mai Hontama (Q) | 148 | Win | 6–4, 7–5 |
| Pan Pacific Open; Tokyo, Japan; WTA 500; Hard, outdoor; 25 September 2023 – 1 October 2023 | 68 | QF | Veronika Kudermetova (8) | 19 | Loss | 2–6, 6–2, 4–6 |
| China Open; Beijing, China; WTA 1000; Hard, outdoor; 30 September 2023 – 8 October 2023 | 69 | 1R | (Spain) Sara Sorribes Tormo | 55 | Win | 6–4, 6–3 |
| China Open; Beijing, China; WTA 1000; Hard, outdoor; 30 September 2023 – 8 October 2023 | 70 | 2R | (France) Varvara Gracheva | 47 | Win | 6–4, 6–1 |
| China Open; Beijing, China; WTA 1000; Hard, outdoor; 30 September 2023 – 8 October 2023 | 71 | 3R | (Poland) Magda Linette | 25 | Win | 6–1, 6–1 |
| China Open; Beijing, China; WTA 1000; Hard, outdoor; 30 September 2023 – 8 October 2023 | 72 | QF | (France) Caroline Garcia (9) | 10 | Win | 6–7^{(8–10)}, 7–6^{(7–5)}, 6–1 |
| China Open; Beijing, China; WTA 1000; Hard, outdoor; 30 September 2023 – 8 October 2023 | 73 | SF | (United States) Coco Gauff (3) | 3 | Win | 6–2, 6–3 |
| China Open; Beijing, China; WTA 1000; Hard, outdoor; 30 September 2023 – 8 October 2023 | 74 | W | Liudmila Samsonova | 22 | Win (5) | 6–2, 6–2 |
| WTA Finals; Cancún, Mexico; Year-end championships; Hard, outdoor; 29 October 2023 – 5 November 2023 | 75 | RR | (Czech Republic) Markéta Vondroušová (7) | 6 | Win | 7–6^{(7–3)}, 6–0 |
| WTA Finals; Cancún, Mexico; Year-end championships; Hard, outdoor; 29 October 2023 – 5 November 2023 | 76 | RR | (United States) Coco Gauff (3) | 3 | Win | 6–0, 7–5 |
| WTA Finals; Cancún, Mexico; Year-end championships; Hard, outdoor; 29 October 2023 – 5 November 2023 | 77 | RR | (Tunisia) Ons Jabeur (6) | 7 | Win | 6–1, 6–2 |
| WTA Finals; Cancún, Mexico; Year-end championships; Hard, outdoor; 29 October 2023 – 5 November 2023 | 78 | SF | Aryna Sabalenka (1) | 1 | Win | 6–3, 6–2 |
| WTA Finals; Cancún, Mexico; Year-end championships; Hard, outdoor; 29 October 2023 – 5 November 2023 | 79 | W | (United States) Jessica Pegula (5) | 5 | Win (6) | 6–1, 6–0 |

=== Mixed doubles matches ===
| Tournament | Match | Round | Opponent | Combined Rank | Result | Score |
|---|---|---|---|---|---|---|
| United Cup; Brisbane/Perth/Sydney, Australia; United Cup; Hard, outdoor; 29 December 2022 – 8 January 2023; Partner: (Poland) Hubert Hurkacz | 1 | RR | (Kazakhstan) Zhibek Kulambayeva / (Kazakhstan) Grigoriy Lomakin | 496 | Win | 6–3, 6–4 |
| United Cup; Brisbane/Perth/Sydney, Australia; United Cup; Hard, outdoor; 29 December 2022 – 8 January 2023; Partner: (Poland) Hubert Hurkacz | – | RR | (Switzerland) Belinda Bencic / (Switzerland) Stan Wawrinka | 162 | Withdrew | —N/a |
| United Cup; Brisbane/Perth/Sydney, Australia; United Cup; Hard, outdoor; 29 December 2022 – 8 January 2023; Partner: (Poland) Hubert Hurkacz | 2 | HF | (Italy) Lorenzo Musetti / (Italy) Camilla Rosatello | 197 | Win | 6–1, 6–2 |
| United Cup; Brisbane/Perth/Sydney, Australia; United Cup; Hard, outdoor; 29 December 2022 – 8 January 2023; Partner: (Poland) Hubert Hurkacz | – | SF | (United States) Taylor Fritz / (United States) Jessica Pegula | 12 | Withdrew | —N/a |

== Tournament schedule ==
=== Singles schedule ===
| Date | Tournament | Location | Tier | Surface | Prev. result | Prev. points | New points | Result |
|---|---|---|---|---|---|---|---|---|
| 29 December 2022 – 8 January 2023 | United Cup | Australia | United Cup | Hard | N/A | 0 | 125 | Semifinals lost to (United States) Jessica Pegula; 2–6, 2–6 |
| 16 January 2023 – 29 January 2023 | Australian Open | Australia | Grand Slam | Hard | SF | 780 | 240 | Fourth round lost to (Kazakhstan) Elena Rybakina; 4–6, 4–6 |
| 13 February 2023 – 19 February 2023 | Qatar Open | Qatar | WTA 500 | Hard | W | 900 | 470 | Champion defeated (United States) Jessica Pegula; 6–3, 6–0 |
| 20 February 2023 – 26 February 2023 | Dubai Championships | United Arab Emirates | WTA 1000 | Hard | 2R | 55 | 585 | Final lost to (Czech Republic) Barbora Krejčíková; 4–6, 2–6 |
| 6 March 2023 – 19 March 2023 | Indian Wells Open | United States | WTA 1000 | Hard | W | 1000 | 390 | Semifinals lost to (Kazakhstan) Elena Rybakina; 2–6, 2–6 |
| 17 April 2023 – 23 April 2023 | Stuttgart Open | Germany | WTA 500 | Clay (i) | W | 470 | 470 | Champion defeated Aryna Sabalenka; 6–3, 6–4 |
| 24 April 2023 – 7 May 2023 | Madrid Open | Spain | WTA 1000 | Clay | N/A | 0 | 650 | Final lost to Aryna Sabalenka; 3–6, 6–3, 3–6 |
| 9 May 2023 – 21 May 2023 | Italian Open | Italy | WTA 1000 | Clay | W | 900 | 215 | Quarterfinals lost to (Kazakhstan) Elena Rybakina; 6–2, 6–7^{(3–7)}, 2–2, ret. |
| 28 May 2023 – 11 June 2023 | French Open | France | Grand Slam | Clay | W | 2000 | 2000 | Champion defeated (Czech Republic) Karolína Muchová; 6–2, 5–7, 6–4 |
| 25 June 2023 – 1 July 2023 | Bad Homburg Open | Germany | WTA 250 | Grass | N/A | 0 | (110) | Semifinals withdrew against (Italy) Lucia Bronzetti; N/A |
| 3 July 2023 – 16 July 2023 | Wimbledon Championships | United Kingdom | Grand Slam | Grass | 3R | —N/a (Note: Following the All England Lawn Tennis and Croquet Club's decision to ban Russian and Belarusian players from the 2022 Wimbledon Championships due to the Russian invasion of Ukraine, the ITF, ATP, and WTA stripped the event of ranking points.) | 430 | Quarterfinals lost to (Ukraine) Elina Svitolina; 5–7, 7–6^{(7–5)}, 2–6 |
| 24 July 2023 – 30 July 2023 | Poland Open | Poland | WTA 250 | Hard | QF | 60 | 280 | Champion defeated (Germany) Laura Siegemund; 6–0, 6–1 |
| 7 August 2023 – 13 August 2023 | Canadian Open | Canada | WTA 1000 | Hard | 3R | 105 | 350 | Semifinals lost to (United States) Jessica Pegula; 2–6, 7–6^{(7–4)}, 4–6 |
| 13 August 2023 – 20 August 2023 | Cincinnati Open | United States | WTA 1000 | Hard | 3R | 105 | 350 | Semifinals lost to (United States) Coco Gauff; 6–7^{(2–7)}, 6–3, 4–6 |
| 28 August 2023 – 10 September 2023 | US Open | United States | Grand Slam | Hard | W | 2000 | 240 | Fourth round lost to (Latvia) Jeļena Ostapenko; 6–3, 3–6, 1–6 |
| 25 September 2023 – 1 October 2023 | Pan Pacific Open | Japan | WTA 500 | Hard | N/A | 0 | (100) | Quarterfinals lost to Veronika Kudermetova; 2–6, 6–2, 4–6 |
| 30 September 2023 – 8 October 2023 | China Open | China | WTA 1000 | Hard | N/A | 0 | 1000 | Champion defeated Liudmila Samsonova; 6–2, 6–2 |
| 29 October 2023 – 5 November 2023 | WTA Finals | Mexico | WTA Finals | Hard | SF | 750 | 1500 | Champion defeated (United States) Jessica Pegula; 6–1, 6–0 |
| Total year-end points | | | | | | | 9295 | |

=== Mixed doubles schedule ===
| Date | Tournament | Location | Tier | Surface | Prev. result | Result |
|---|---|---|---|---|---|---|
| 29 December 2022 – 8 January 2023 | United Cup | Australia | United Cup | Hard | N/A | Semifinals withdrew against (United States) Taylor Fritz / (United States) Jessica Pegula; N/A |

== Yearly records ==
=== Head-to-head match-ups ===
Ordered by percentage of wins

- (United States) Danielle Collins 3–0
- (United States) Claire Liu 3–0
- (Switzerland) Belinda Bencic 2–0
- (Spain) Cristina Bucșa 2–0
- (Croatia) Petra Martić 2–0
- (Czech Republic) Karolína Muchová 2–0
- (Czech Republic) Karolína Plíšková 2–0
- (Ukraine) Lesia Tsurenko 2–0
- (China) Zheng Qinwen 2–0
- (Spain) Sara Sorribes Tormo 2–0
- Liudmila Samsonova 2–0
- (Czech Republic) Markéta Vondroušová 2–0
- (Uzbekistan) Nigina Abduraimova 1–0
- Ekaterina Alexandrova 1–0
- (Canada) Bianca Andreescu 1–0
- Anna Blinkova 1–0
- (Romania) Sorana Cîrstea 1–0
- (Canada) Leylah Fernandez 1–0
- (Austria) Julia Grabher 1–0
- (Brazil) Beatriz Haddad Maia 1–0
- (Tunisia) Ons Jabeur 2–0
- (Slovenia) Kaja Juvan 1–0
- (Germany) Tatjana Maria 1–0
- (Germany) Jule Niemeier 1–0
- (Czech Republic) Linda Nosková 1–0
- (Colombia) Camila Osorio 1–0
- Anastasia Pavlyuchenkova 1–0
- (United States) Bernarda Pera 1–0
- (Sweden) Rebecca Peterson 1–0
- (Kazakhstan) Yulia Putintseva 1–0
- (United Kingdom) Emma Raducanu 1–0
- (Australia) Daria Saville 1–0
- (Germany) Laura Siegemund 1–0
- (Switzerland) Jil Teichmann 1–0
- (Italy) Martina Trevisan 1–0
- (Croatia) Donna Vekić 1–0
- (China) Wang Xinyu 1–0
- (Belgium) Yanina Wickmayer 1–0
- (China) Zhu Lin 1–0
- (Japan) Mai Hontama 1–0
- (United States) Coco Gauff 4–1
- Veronika Kudermetova 2–1
- Aryna Sabalenka 2–1
- (United States) Jessica Pegula 2–2
- (Czech Republic) Barbora Krejčíková 0–1
- (Latvia) Jeļena Ostapenko 0–1
- (Ukraine) Elina Svitolina 0–1
- (Kazakhstan) Elena Rybakina 0–3

=== Top 10 record ===
| Result | W–L | Opponent | Rank | Tournament | Surface | Rd | Score | IŚR |
|---|---|---|---|---|---|---|---|---|
| Loss | 0–1 | (United States) Jessica Pegula | No. 3 | United Cup, Australia | Hard | SF | 2–6, 2–6 | No. 1 |
| Win | 1–1 | (United States) Jessica Pegula | No. 4 | Qatar Open, Qatar | Hard | F | 6–3, 6–0 | No. 1 |
| Win | 2–1 | (United States) Coco Gauff | No. 6 | Dubai Tennis Championships, UAE | Hard | SF | 6–4, 6–2 | No. 1 |
| Loss | 2–2 | (Kazakhstan) Elena Rybakina | No. 10 | Indian Wells Open, United States | Hard | SF | 2–6, 2–6 | No. 1 |
| Win | 3–2 | (Tunisia) Ons Jabeur | No. 4 | Stuttgart Open, Germany | Clay (i) | SF | 3–0, ret. | No. 1 |
| Win | 4–2 | Aryna Sabalenka | No. 2 | Stuttgart Open, Germany | Clay (i) | F | 6–3, 6–4 | No. 1 |
| Loss | 4–3 | Aryna Sabalenka | No. 2 | Madrid Open, Spain | Clay | F | 3–6, 6–3, 3–6 | No. 1 |
| Loss | 4–4 | (Kazakhstan) Elena Rybakina | No. 7 | Italian Open, Italy | Clay | QF | 6–2, 6–7^{(3–7)}, 2–2 ret. | No. 1 |
| Win | 5–4 | (United States) Coco Gauff | No. 6 | French Open, France | Clay | QF | 6–4, 6–2 | No. 1 |
| Loss | 5–5 | (United States) Jessica Pegula | No. 3 | Canadian Open, Canada | Hard | SF | 2–6, 7–6^{(7–4)}, 4–6 | No. 1 |
| Win | 6–5 | (Czech Republic) Markéta Vondroušová | No. 10 | Cincinnati Open, United States | Hard | QF | 7–6^{(7–3)}, 6–1 | No. 1 |
| Loss | 6–6 | (United States) Coco Gauff | No. 7 | Cincinnati Open, United States | Hard | SF | 6–7^{(2–7)}, 6–3, 4–6 | No. 1 |
| Win | 7–6 | (France) Caroline Garcia | No. 10 | China Open, China | Hard | QF | 6–7^{(8-10)}, 7–6^{(7–5)}, 6–1 | No. 2 |
| Win | 8–6 | (United States) Coco Gauff | No. 3 | China Open, China | Hard | SF | 6–2, 6–3 | No. 2 |
| Win | 9–6 | (Czech Republic) Markéta Vondroušová | No. 6 | WTA Finals, Mexico | Hard | RR | 7–6^{(7–3)}, 6–0 | No. 2 |
| Win | 10–6 | (United States) Coco Gauff | No. 3 | WTA Finals, Mexico | Hard | RR | 6–0, 7–5 | No. 2 |
| Win | 11–6 | (Tunisia) Ons Jabeur | No. 7 | WTA Finals, Mexico | Hard | RR | 6–1, 6–2 | No. 2 |
| Win | 12–6 | Aryna Sabalenka | No. 1 | WTA Finals, Mexico | Hard | SF | 6–3, 6–2 | No. 2 |
| Win | 13–6 | (United States) Jessica Pegula | No. 5 | WTA Finals, Mexico | Hard | F | 6–1, 6–0 | No. 2 |

=== Finals ===
==== Singles: 8 (6 titles, 2 runner-ups) ====
| Legend Grand Slam tournaments (1–0) WTA Tour Championships (1–0) WTA Elite Trophy (0–0) WTA 1000 (1–2) WTA 500 (2–0) WTA 250 (1–0) | Finals by surface Hard (4–1) Clay (2–1) Grass (0–0) | Finals by setting Outdoor (4–2) Indoor (1–0) |

| Result | W–L | Date | Tournament | Tier | Surface | Opponent | Score |
|---|---|---|---|---|---|---|---|
| Win | 1–0 | Feb 2023 | Qatar Open, Qatar | WTA 500 | Hard | (United States) Jessica Pegula | 6–3, 6–0 |
| Loss | 1–1 | Feb 2023 | Dubai Tennis Championships, UAE | WTA 1000 | Hard | (Czech Republic) Barbora Krejčíková | 4–6, 2–6 |
| Win | 2–1 | Apr 2023 | Stuttgart Open, Germany | WTA 500 | Clay (i) | Aryna Sabalenka | 6–3, 6–4 |
| Loss | 2–2 | May 2023 | Madrid Open, Spain | WTA 1000 | Clay | Aryna Sabalenka | 3–6, 6–3, 3–6 |
| Win | 3–2 | Jun 2023 | French Open, France | Grand Slam | Clay | (Czech Republic) Karolína Muchová | 6–2, 5–7, 6–4 |
| Win | 4–2 | Jul 2023 | Poland Open, Poland | WTA 250 | Hard | (Germany) Laura Siegemund | 6–0, 6–1 |
| Win | 5–2 | Oct 2023 | China Open, China | WTA 1000 | Hard | Liudmila Samsonova | 6–2, 6–2 |
| Win | 6–2 | Nov 2023 | WTA Finals, Mexico | WTA Finals | Hard | (United States) Jessica Pegula | 6–1, 6–0 |

=== Earnings ===
| # | Tournament | Singles Prize money | Doubles Prize money | Year-to-date |
|---|---|---|---|---|
| 1. | United Cup | $384,375 | $0 | $384,375 |
| 2. | Australian Open | $236,578 | $0 | $620,953 |
| 3. | Qatar Open | $120,150 | $0 | $741,103 |
| 4. | Dubai Tennis Championships | $267,690 | $0 | $1,008,793 |
| 5. | Indian Wells Open | $352,635 | $0 | $1,361,428 |
| 6. | Stuttgart Open | $104,478 | $0 | $1,465,906 |
| 7. | Madrid Open | $580,000 | $0 | $2,045,906 |
| 8. | Italian Open | $73,930 | $0 | $2,119,836 |
| 9. | French Open | $2,300,000 | $0 | $4,419,836 |
| 10. | Bad Homburg Open | $11,275 | $0 | $4,431,111 |
| 11. | Wimbledon Championships | $430,347 | $0 | $4,861,458 |
| 12. | Poland Open | $34,228 | $0 | $4,895,686 |
| 13. | Canadian Open | $138,000 | $0 | $5,033,686 |
| 14. | Cincinnati Open | $138,000 | $0 | $5,171,686 |
| 15. | US Open | $284,000 | $0 | $5,455,686 |
| 16. | Pan Pacific Open | $21,075 | $0 | $5,476,761 |
| 17. | China Open | $1,324,000 | $0 | $6,800,761 |
| 18. | WTA Finals | $3,056,925 | $0 | $9,857,686 |
| Total prize money | | $9,857,686 | $0 | $9,857,686 |

== See also ==
- 2023 Aryna Sabalenka tennis season
