= 2021 WTA Poland Open =

- Date: 19–25 July
- Edition: 1st
- Category: WTA 250
- Draw: 32S / 16D
- Prize money: $235,238
- Surface: Clay / outdoor
- Location: Gdynia, Poland
- Venue: Arka Tennis Club

Champions

Singles
- (Belgium) Maryna Zanevska

Doubles
- (Kazakhstan) Anna Danilina / (Belarus) Lidziya Marozava
WTA Poland Open	· 2022 →

The 2021 WTA Poland Open (also known as the BNP Paribas Poland Open for sponsorship purposes) was a women's tennis tournament played on outdoor clay courts. It was the first edition of the WTA Poland Open, and part of the WTA 250 series of the 2021 WTA Tour. It was held at the Arka Tennis Club in Gdynia, Poland, from 19 July until 25 July 2021. Unseeded Maryna Zanevska won the singles title.

== Finals ==
=== Singles ===
- (Belgium) Maryna Zanevska defeated (Slovakia) Kristína Kučová 6–4, 7–6^{(7–4)}

=== Doubles ===
- (Kazakhstan) Anna Danilina / (Belarus) Lidziya Marozava defeated (Ukraine) Kateryna Bondarenko / (Poland) Katarzyna Piter 6–3, 6–2

== Singles main draw entrants ==
=== Seeds ===
Country	Player	Rank^{1}	Seed
~~KAZ~~	~~Yulia Putintseva~~	~~42~~	~~1~~
~~SLO~~	~~Tamara Zidanšek~~	~~50~~	~~2~~
ROU	Irina-Camelia Begu	71	3
~~CZE~~	~~Tereza Martincová~~	~~78~~	~~4~~
RUS	Anna Blinkova	82	5
BLR	Aliaksandra Sasnovich	86	6
RUS	Varvara Gracheva	89	7
~~UKR~~	~~Anhelina Kalinina~~	~~95~~	~~8~~
ESP	Nuria Párrizas Díaz	117	9
ROU	Irina Bara	119	10
BLR	Olga Govortsova	124	11

- ^{1} Rankings are as of 12 July 2021.

=== Other entrants ===
The following players received wildcards into the main draw:

- (Poland) Weronika Baszak
- (Russia) Valeriia Olianovskaia
- (Poland) Urszula Radwańska
- (United States) Katie Volynets

The following player received entry as a special exempt:

- (Belgium) Maryna Zanevska

The following players received entry from the qualifying draw:

- (Hungary) Anna Bondár
- (Ukraine) Kateryna Bondarenko
- (Italy) Federica Di Sarra
- (Georgia (country)) Ekaterine Gorgodze

The following players received entry as lucky losers:

- (Russia) Amina Anshba
- (Poland) Weronika Falkowska
- (United States) Jamie Loeb
- (Russia) Marina Melnikova
- (Croatia) Tereza Mrdeža
- (Russia) Anastasia Zakharova

=== Withdrawals ===
Before the tournament

- (France) Clara Burel → replaced by (Poland) Weronika Falkowska
- (United Kingdom) Harriet Dart → replaced by (Slovakia) Kristína Kučová
- (Slovenia) Polona Hercog → replaced by (Ukraine) Kateryna Kozlova
- (Germany) Anna-Lena Friedsam → replaced by (Slovakia) Viktória Kužmová
- (Ukraine) Anhelina Kalinina → replaced by (Russia) Anastasia Zakharova
- (Czech Republic) Tereza Martincová → replaced by (Russia) Marina Melnikova
- (Russia) Anna Kalinskaya → replaced by (United States) Varvara Lepchenko
- (Kazakhstan) Yulia Putintseva → replaced by (Croatia) Tereza Mrdeža
- (Serbia) Nina Stojanović → replaced by (Spain) Nuria Párrizas Díaz
- (Switzerland) Stefanie Vögele → replaced by (Russia) Amina Anshba
- (Slovenia) Tamara Zidanšek → replaced by (United States) Jamie Loeb

== Doubles main draw entrants ==
=== Seeds ===
Country	Player	Country	Player	Rank^{1}	Seed
JPN	Miyu Kato	CZE	Renata Voráčová	152	1
GEO	Ekaterine Gorgodze	GEO	Oksana Kalashnikova	189	2
KAZ	Anna Danilina	BLR	Lidziya Marozava	244	3
UKR	Kateryna Bondarenko	POL	Katarzyna Piter	254	4

- ^{1} Rankings are as of 12 July 2021.

=== Other entrants ===
The following pairs received wildcards into the doubles main draw:

- (Poland) Weronika Baszak / (Russia) Varvara Flink
- (Poland) Weronika Falkowska / (Poland) Paula Kania-Choduń

=== Withdrawals ===
Before the tournament

- (Romania) Irina Bara / (Romania) Mihaela Buzărnescu → replaced by (Russia) Alena Fomina / (Croatia) Tereza Mrdeža
- (Slovakia) Tereza Mihalíková / (Hungary) Fanny Stollár → replaced by (Poland) Ania Hertel / (Poland) Martyna Kubka

During the tournament

- (Romania) Irina Bara / (United States) Varvara Lepchenko
