= 2022 WTA Poland Open =

- Date: 25–31 July
- Edition: 2nd
- Category: WTA 250
- Draw: 32S / 16D
- Prize money: $251,750
- Surface: Clay / outdoor
- Location: Warsaw, Poland
- Venue: Legia Tenis & Golf

Champions

Singles
- (France) Caroline Garcia

Doubles
- (Kazakhstan) Anna Danilina / (Germany) Anna-Lena Friedsam
← 2021 ·	WTA Poland Open	· 2023 →

The 2022 WTA Poland Open (also known as the BNP Paribas Poland Open for sponsorship purposes) was a women's tennis tournament played on outdoor clay courts. It was the second edition of the WTA Poland Open, and part of the WTA 250 series of the 2022 WTA Tour. It was held at the Legia Tennis Centre in Warsaw, Poland, from 25 until 31 July 2022.

== Finals ==
=== Singles ===
(France) Caroline Garcia defeated (Romania) Ana Bogdan, 6–4, 6–1.

- It was Garcia's ninth WTA Tour singles title, and second of the year.

=== Doubles ===
(Kazakhstan) Anna Danilina / (Germany) Anna-Lena Friedsam defeated (Poland) Katarzyna Kawa / (Poland) Alicja Rosolska, 6–4, 5–7, [10–5]

== Singles main draw entrants ==
=== Seeds ===
Country	Player	Rank^{†}	Seed
POL	Iga Świątek	1	1
~~KAZ~~	~~Yulia Putintseva~~	~~39~~	~~2~~
~~ESP~~	~~Sara Sorribes Tormo~~	~~41~~	~~3~~
~~ROU~~	~~Irina-Camelia Begu~~	~~44~~	~~4~~
FRA	Caroline Garcia	48	5
HUN	Anna Bondár	50	6
ESP	Nuria Párrizas Díaz	54	7
CRO	Petra Martić	55	8
	Varvara Gracheva	59	9
ITA	Jasmine Paolini	61	10
BEL	Maryna Zanevska	72	11

^{†} Rankings are as of 18 July 2022.

=== Other entrants ===
The following players received wildcard entry into the singles main draw:

- (Poland) Maja Chwalińska
- (Poland) Weronika Falkowska
- (Poland) Martyna Kubka

The following player received entry into the main draw with a protected ranking:

- (Argentina) Nadia Podoroska

The following players received entry from the qualifying draw:

- (Romania) Alexandra Cadanțu-Ignatik
- (Italy) Sara Errani
- (Netherlands) Arianne Hartono
- (Czech Republic) Jesika Malečková
- (Cyprus) Raluca Șerban
- (Spain) Rebeka Masarova

The following players received entry as lucky losers:

- (Ukraine) Kateryna Baindl
- (Romania) Gabriela Lee
- (Brazil) Laura Pigossi

=== Withdrawals ===
Before the tournament

- (Romania) Irina-Camelia Begu → replaced by (Brazil) Laura Pigossi
- (Slovenia) Kaja Juvan → replaced by (Poland) Magdalena Fręch
- (Ukraine) Marta Kostyuk → replaced by (Montenegro) Danka Kovinić
- (Kazakhstan) Yulia Putintseva → replaced by (Ukraine) Kateryna Baindl
- (Germany) Laura Siegemund → replaced by (Romania) Ana Bogdan
- (Spain) Sara Sorribes Tormo → replaced by (Romania) Gabriela Lee
- (China) Zhang Shuai → replaced by (Japan) Misaki Doi
- (Slovenia) Tamara Zidanšek → replaced by (France) Clara Burel

== Doubles main draw entrants ==
=== Seeds ===
Country	Player	Country	Player	Rank^{†}	Seed
HUN	Anna Bondár	BEL	Kimberley Zimmermann	119	1
POL	Katarzyna Kawa	POL	Alicja Rosolska	125	2
GEO	Natela Dzalamidze	SUI	Viktorija Golubic	159	3
KAZ	Anna Danilina	GER	Anna-Lena Friedsam	174	4

† Rankings are as of 18 July 2022.

=== Other entrants ===
The following pairs received wildcard entry into main draw:

- (Poland) Zuzanna Bednarz / (Poland) Weronika Ewald
- (Poland) Ania Hertel / (Poland) Martyna Kubka

The following pair received entry into main draw using a protected ranking:

- (Poland) Paula Kania-Choduń / (Czech Republic) Renata Voráčová

=== Withdrawals ===
- (United States) Sophie Chang / (United States) Angela Kulikov → replaced by (Spain) Nuria Párrizas Díaz / (Netherlands) Arantxa Rus
- (Kazakhstan) Anna Danilina / (Serbia) Aleksandra Krunić → replaced by (Kazakhstan) Anna Danilina / (Germany) Anna-Lena Friedsam
- (Poland) Katarzyna Kawa / (Germany) Vivian Heisen → replaced by (Venezuela) Andrea Gámiz / (Brazil) Laura Pigossi
- (Poland) Katarzyna Piter / (Poland) Alicja Rosolska → replaced by (Poland) Katarzyna Kawa / (Poland) Alicja Rosolska
- (Germany) Laura Siegemund / (China) Zhang Shuai → replaced by (Hungary) Réka Luca Jani / (Hungary) Adrienn Nagy
