= 2023 WTA Poland Open – Doubles =

Doubles
- 2023 WTA Poland Open

Final
- Champions: (United Kingdom) Heather Watson (Belgium) Yanina Wickmayer
- Runners-up: (Poland) Weronika Falkowska (Poland) Katarzyna Piter
- Score: 6–4, 6–4

Events
Singles	Doubles
← 2022 ·	WTA Poland Open	· 2024 →

Heather Watson and Yanina Wickmayer defeated Weronika Falkowska and Katarzyna Piter in the final, 6–4, 6–4 to win the doubles tennis title at the 2023 WTA Poland Open.

Anna Danilina and Anna-Lena Friedsam were the reigning champions, but Friedsam did not participate this year and Danilina chose to compete in Hamburg instead.

== Seeds ==
1. (China) Zhang Shuai / (China) Zhu Lin (first round)
2. (Georgia (country)) Natela Dzalamidze / (Romania) Monica Niculescu (withdrew)
3. (Slovakia) Viktória Hrunčáková / (Slovakia) Tereza Mihalíková (quarterfinals)
4. Lidziya Marozava / Aliaksandra Sasnovich (quarterfinals)
5. (United Kingdom) Alicia Barnett / (United Kingdom) Olivia Nicholls (first round)

== Draw ==
=== Key ===
- Q = Qualifier
- WC = Wild card
- LL = Lucky loser
- Alt = Alternate
- SE = Special exempt
- PR = Protected ranking
- ITF = ITF entry
- JE = Junior exempt
- w/o = Walkover
- r = Retired
- d = Defaulted
- SR = Special ranking

=== Draw ===
First round
1	(China) S Zhang (China) L Zhu	3	2
(Czech Republic) L Nosková (China) Xiy Wang	6	6
(United Kingdom) N Bains (United Kingdom) M Lumsden	6	7
WC	(Poland) M Kubka (Serbia) N Stevanović	2	5
4	L Marozava; A Sasnovich	6	7
(Japan) N Hibino (Georgia (country)) O Kalashnikova	1	5
(Poland) W Falkowska (Poland) K Piter	6	6
(Uzbekistan) N Abduraimova (United Kingdom) J Burrage	3	1
Alt	(India) A Raina (China) Y Yuan	7^{7}	7
WC	(Poland) M Chwalińska (France) J Ponchet	6^{3}	5
(Romania) O Gavrilă (Indonesia) J Rompies	3	2
3	(Slovakia) V Hrunčáková (Slovakia) T Mihalíková	6	6
(Thailand) L Kumkhum (Thailand) P Plipuech	7^{7}	1	[5]
(Czech Republic) L Fruhvirtová (Germany) L Siegemund	6^{3}	6	[10]
(United Kingdom) H Watson (Belgium) Y Wickmayer	6	5	[10]
5	(United Kingdom) A Barnett (United Kingdom) O Nicholls	2	7	[7]

Quarterfinals
(Czech Republic) L Nosková (China) Xiy Wang	6	6
(United Kingdom) N Bains (United Kingdom) M Lumsden	3	2
4	L Marozava; A Sasnovich	4	5
(Poland) W Falkowska (Poland) K Piter	6	7
Alt	(India) A Raina (China) Y Yuan	3	7^{9}	[10]
3	(Slovakia) V Hrunčáková (Slovakia) T Mihalíková	6	6^{7}	[6]
(Czech Republic) L Fruhvirtová (Germany) L Siegemund
(United Kingdom) H Watson (Belgium) Y Wickmayer	w/o

Semifinals
(Czech Republic) L Nosková (China) Xiy Wang	4	4
(Poland) W Falkowska (Poland) K Piter	6	6
Alt	(India) A Raina (China) Y Yuan	0	7^{8}	[6]
(United Kingdom) H Watson (Belgium) Y Wickmayer	6	6^{6}	[10]

Final
(Poland) W Falkowska (Poland) K Piter	4	4
(United Kingdom) H Watson (Belgium) Y Wickmayer	6	6
