= 2022 WTA Poland Open – Singles =

Singles
- 2022 WTA Poland Open

Final
- Champion: (France) Caroline Garcia
- Runner-up: (Romania) Ana Bogdan
- Score: 6–4, 6–1

Details
- Draw: 32
- Seeds: 8

Events
Singles	Doubles
← 2021 ·	WTA Poland Open	· 2023 →

Caroline Garcia defeated Ana Bogdan in the final, 6–4, 6–1 to win the singles tennis title at the 2022 WTA Poland Open.

Maryna Zanevska was the defending champion (from when the event was last played in Gdynia), but lost in the first round to Kateryna Baindl.

== Seeds ==
1. (Poland) Iga Świątek (quarterfinals)
2. (Kazakhstan) Yulia Putintseva (withdrew)
3. (Spain) Sara Sorribes Tormo (withdrew)
4. (Romania) Irina-Camelia Begu (withdrew)
5. (France) Caroline Garcia (champion)
6. (Hungary) Anna Bondár (first round)
7. (Spain) Nuria Párrizas Díaz (first round)
8. (Croatia) Petra Martić (quarterfinals)
9. Varvara Gracheva (first round)
10. (Italy) Jasmine Paolini (semifinals)
11. (Belgium) Maryna Zanevska (first round)

== Draw ==
=== Key ===
- Q = Qualifier
- WC = Wild card
- LL = Lucky loser
- Alt = Alternate
- SE = Special exempt
- PR = Protected ranking
- ITF = ITF entry
- JE = Junior exempt
- w/o = Walkover
- r = Retired
- d = Defaulted
- SR = Special ranking

=== Finals ===
Semifinals
5	(France) Caroline Garcia	6	6
10	(Italy) Jasmine Paolini	1	2
LL	(Ukraine) Kateryna Baindl	5	5
(Romania) Ana Bogdan	7	7

Final
5	(France) Caroline Garcia	6	6
(Romania) Ana Bogdan	4	1

=== Top half ===
First round
1	(Poland) I Świątek	6	6
(Poland) M Fręch	1	2
Q	(Cyprus) R Șerban	6	2	5
LL	(Romania) G Lee	3	6	7
(Italy) E Cocciaretto	6	6
WC	(Poland) M Kubka	2	3
(Japan) M Doi	5	4
5	(France) C Garcia	7	6
10	(Italy) J Paolini	6	6
(Montenegro) D Kovinić	1	1
(France) C Burel	7^{7}	6
(Slovakia) AK Schmiedlová	6^{5}	1
Q	(Netherlands) A Hartono	4	7	3
(Switzerland) V Golubic	6	5	6
(France) K Mladenovic	1	7	7^{10}
6	(Hungary) A Bondár	6	5	6^{8}

Second round
1	(Poland) I Świątek	6	6
LL	(Romania) G Lee	3	2
(Italy) E Cocciaretto	3	5
5	(France) C Garcia	6	7
10	(Italy) J Paolini	6	6^{1}	6
(France) C Burel	1	7^{7}	0
(Switzerland) V Golubic	6^{4}	6	6
(France) K Mladenovic	7^{7}	2	1

Quarterfinals
1	(Poland) I Świątek	1	6	4
5	(France) C Garcia	6	1	6
10	(Italy) J Paolini	1	6	6
(Switzerland) V Golubic	6	2	2

Semifinals
5	(France) C Garcia	6	6
10	(Italy) J Paolini	1	2

=== Bottom half ===
First round
8	(Croatia) P Martić	7	6
WC	(Poland) W Falkowska	5	4
Q	(Spain) R Masarova	5	2
WC	(Poland) M Chwalińska	7	6
Q	(Italy) S Errani	6	5	6
(Netherlands) A Rus	1	7	4
LL	(Ukraine) K Baindl	6	6
11	(Belgium) M Zanevska	3	3
7	(Spain) N Párrizas Díaz	4	6^{3}
(Romania) A Bogdan	6	7^{7}
Q	(Czech Republic) J Malečková	2	4
(Czech Republic) K Siniaková	6	6
PR	(Argentina) N Podoroska	6	6
Q	(Romania) A Cadanțu-Ignatik	1	1
LL	(Brazil) L Pigossi	6	6
9	V Gracheva	2	4

Second round
8	(Croatia) P Martić	6	3	6
WC	(Poland) M Chwalińska	3	6	3
Q	(Italy) S Errani	2	0^{r}
LL	(Ukraine) K Baindl	6	3
(Romania) A Bogdan	6	6
(Czech Republic) K Siniaková	0	4
PR	(Argentina) N Podoroska	6	0	4
LL	(Brazil) L Pigossi	3	6	6

Quarterfinals
8	(Croatia) P Martić	6	3	4
LL	(Ukraine) K Baindl	1	6	6
(Romania) A Bogdan	6	6
LL	(Brazil) L Pigossi	1	1

Semifinals
LL	(Ukraine) K Baindl	5	5
(Romania) A Bogdan	7	7

== Qualifying ==
=== Seeds ===
1. (Brazil) Laura Pigossi (qualifying competition, lucky loser)
2. (Italy) Sara Errani (qualified)
3. (Poland) Katarzyna Kawa (first round)
4. (Hungary) Réka Luca Jani (first round)
5. (Ukraine) Kateryna Baindl (qualifying competition, lucky loser)
6. (Romania) Gabriela Lee (qualifying competition, lucky loser)
7. (Germany) Nastasja Schunk (first round)
8. (Belgium) Ysaline Bonaventure (first round)
9. (Netherlands) Arianne Hartono (qualified)
10. (Greece) Despina Papamichail (qualifying competition)
11. (Romania) Alexandra Cadanțu-Ignatik (qualified)
12. (Spain) Rebeka Masarova (qualified)

=== Qualifiers ===
1. (Netherlands) Arianne Hartono
2. (Italy) Sara Errani
3. (Spain) Rebeka Masarova
4. (Cyprus) Raluca Șerban
5. (Czech Republic) Jesika Malečková
6. (Romania) Alexandra Cadanțu-Ignatik

=== Lucky losers ===
1. (Brazil) Laura Pigossi
2. (Ukraine) Kateryna Baindl
3. (Romania) Gabriela Lee

=== Qualifying draw ===
==== First qualifier ====
First round
1	(Brazil) Laura Pigossi	7^{11}	6
(Bulgaria) Isabella Shinikova	6^{9}	1
(Japan) Yuki Naito	2	4
9	(Netherlands) Arianne Hartono	6	6

Qualifying competition
1	(Brazil) Laura Pigossi	5	6^{3}
9	(Netherlands) Arianne Hartono	7	7^{7}

==== Second qualifier ====
First round
2	(Italy) Sara Errani	6^{2}	6	6
(Spain) Andrea Lázaro García	7^{7}	3	0
(Argentina) Paula Ormaechea	6	7
8	(Belgium) Ysaline Bonaventure	4	5

Qualifying competition
2	(Italy) Sara Errani	6	6
(Argentina) Paula Ormaechea	2	3

==== Third qualifier ====
First round
3	(Poland) Katarzyna Kawa	6^{4}	2
(Croatia) Tena Lukas	7^{7}	6
WC	(Poland) Weronika Baszak	3	4
12	(Spain) Rebeka Masarova	6	6

Qualifying competition
(Croatia) Tena Lukas	6	6^{2}	5
12	(Spain) Rebeka Masarova	4	7^{7}	7

==== Fourth qualifier ====
First round
4	(Hungary) Réka Luca Jani	5	2
(Cyprus) Raluca Șerban	7	6
WC	(Poland) Weronika Ewald	4	0^{r}
10	(Greece) Despina Papamichail	6	5

Qualifying competition
(Cyprus) Raluca Șerban	4	7^{7}	6
10	(Greece) Despina Papamichail	6	6^{5}	1

==== Fifth qualifier ====
First round
5	(Ukraine) Kateryna Baindl	6	6
Yuliya Hatouka	4	3
(Czech Republic) Jesika Malečková	6	7^{7}
7	(Germany) Nastasja Schunk	3	6^{2}

Qualifying competition
5	(Ukraine) Kateryna Baindl	7	4	2
(Czech Republic) Jesika Malečková	5	6	6

==== Sixth qualifier ====
First round
6	(Romania) Gabriela Lee	6	6
WC	(Poland) Zuzanna Bednarz	2	0
WC	(Poland) Anna Hertel	1	5
11	(Romania) Alexandra Cadanțu-Ignatik	6	7

Qualifying competition
6	(Romania) Gabriela Lee	6	1	2
11	(Romania) Alexandra Cadanțu-Ignatik	1	6	6
