= 2022 WTA Poland Open – Doubles =

Doubles
- 2022 WTA Poland Open

Final
- Champions: (Kazakhstan) Anna Danilina (Germany) Anna-Lena Friedsam
- Runners-up: (Poland) Katarzyna Kawa (Poland) Alicja Rosolska
- Score: 6–4, 5–7, [10–5]

Events
Singles	Doubles
← 2021 ·	WTA Poland Open	· 2023 →

Defending champion Anna Danilina and her partner Anna-Lena Friedsam defeated Katarzyna Kawa and Alicja Rosolska in the final, 6–4, 5–7, [10–5] to win the doubles tennis title at the 2022 WTA Poland Open.

Danilina and Lidziya Marozava were the reigning champions, but Marozava did not participate.

== Seeds ==
1. (Hungary) Anna Bondár / (Belgium) Kimberley Zimmermann (first round)
2. (Poland) Katarzyna Kawa / (Poland) Alicja Rosolska (final)
3. (Georgia (country)) Natela Dzalamidze / (Switzerland) Viktorija Golubic (semifinals)
4. (Kazakhstan) Anna Danilina / (Germany) Anna-Lena Friedsam (champions)

== Draw ==
=== Key ===
- Q = Qualifier
- WC = Wild card
- LL = Lucky loser
- Alt = Alternate
- SE = Special exempt
- PR = Protected ranking
- ITF = ITF entry
- JE = Junior exempt
- w/o = Walkover
- r = Retired
- d = Defaulted
- SR = Special ranking

=== Draw ===
First round
1	(Hungary) A Bondár (Belgium) K Zimmermann	7^{7}	3	[9]
(Romania) A Bogdan (France) K Mladenovic	6^{2}	6	[11]
(Poland) M Chwalińska (Czech Republic) J Malečková	6^{9}	6	[10]
(Hungary) T Babos (Norway) U Eikeri	7^{11}	3	[6]
4	(Kazakhstan) A Danilina (Germany) A-L Friedsam	6	1	[10]
(Netherlands) A Hartono (Australia) O Tjandramulia	3	6	[6]
(Hungary) RL Jani (Hungary) A Nagy	4	6	[6]
(Romania) A Cadanțu-Ignatik (Romania) G Lee	6	4	[10]
(United Kingdom) A Barnett (United Kingdom) O Nicholls	6	5	[9]
PR	(Poland) P Kania-Choduń (Czech Republic) R Voráčová	3	7	[11]
WC	(Poland) Z Bednarz (Poland) W Ewald	5	1
3	(Georgia (country)) N Dzalamidze (Switzerland) V Golubic	7	6
WC	(Poland) A Hertel (Poland) M Kubka	3	2
(Venezuela) A Gámiz (Brazil) L Pigossi	6	6
(Spain) N Párrizas Díaz (Netherlands) A Rus	2	0
2	(Poland) K Kawa (Poland) A Rosolska	6	6

Quarterfinals
(Romania) A Bogdan (France) K Mladenovic	3	6	[6]
(Poland) M Chwalińska (Czech Republic) J Malečková	6	4	[10]
4	(Kazakhstan) A Danilina (Germany) A-L Friedsam	6	6
(Romania) A Cadanțu-Ignatik (Romania) G Lee	2	3
PR	(Poland) P Kania-Choduń (Czech Republic) R Voráčová	3	4
3	(Georgia (country)) N Dzalamidze (Switzerland) V Golubic	6	6
(Venezuela) A Gámiz (Brazil) L Pigossi	6^{4}	2
2	(Poland) K Kawa (Poland) A Rosolska	7^{7}	6

Semifinals
(Poland) M Chwalińska (Czech Republic) J Malečková	6^{3}	0
4	(Kazakhstan) A Danilina (Germany) A-L Friedsam	7^{7}	6
3	(Georgia (country)) N Dzalamidze (Switzerland) V Golubic	4	6	[8]
2	(Poland) K Kawa (Poland) A Rosolska	6	3	[10]

Final
4	(Kazakhstan) A Danilina (Germany) A-L Friedsam	6	5	[10]
2	(Poland) K Kawa (Poland) A Rosolska	4	7	[5]
