= 2023 WTA Poland Open =

- Date: 24–30 July
- Edition: 3rd
- Category: WTA 250
- Draw: 32S / 16D
- Prize money: $251,750
- Surface: Hard / outdoor
- Location: Warsaw, Poland
- Venue: Legia Tenis & Golf

Champions

Singles
- (Poland) Iga Świątek

Doubles
- (United Kingdom) Heather Watson / (Belgium) Yanina Wickmayer
← 2022 ·	WTA Poland Open	· 2024 →

The 2023 Warsaw Open (also known as the BNP Paribas Warsaw Open for sponsorship purposes) was a women's tennis tournament played on outdoor hard courts. It was the third edition of the WTA Poland Open and part of the WTA 250 series of the 2023 WTA Tour. It was hosted at the Legia Tennis Centre in Warsaw, Poland, from 24 until 30 July 2023.

== Incidents ==
Before the start of the tournament, Russian player Vera Zvonareva was blocked from entering Poland "for reasons of state security and public safety." She was thus forced to withdraw from the tournament.

== Champions ==
=== Singles ===
- (Poland) Iga Świątek def. (Germany) Laura Siegemund, 6–0, 6–1

=== Doubles ===
- (United Kingdom) Heather Watson / (Belgium) Yanina Wickmayer def. (Poland) Weronika Falkowska / (Poland) Katarzyna Piter, 6–4, 6–4

== Singles main draw entrants ==
=== Seeds ===
Country	Player	Rank^{†}	Seed
POL	Iga Świątek	1	1
CZE	Karolína Muchová	18	2
CZE	Kateřina Siniaková	33	3
CHN	Zhu Lin	40	4
CHN	Zhang Shuai	45	5
~~ITA~~	~~Camila Giorgi~~	~~50~~	~~6~~
CZE	Linda Fruhvirtová	56	7
CZE	Linda Nosková	61	8

^{†} Rankings are as of 17 July 2023.

=== Other entrants ===
The following players received wildcard entry into the singles main draw:

- (Poland) Maja Chwalińska
- (Poland) Weronika Ewald
- (Czech Republic) Karolína Muchová

The following player received entry into the main draw with a protected ranking:

- (Slovakia) Kristína Kučová

The following players received entry from the qualifying draw:

- (Croatia) Jana Fett
- Yuliya Hatouka
- (India) Ankita Raina
- (Slovakia) Rebecca Šramková

The following player received entry as a lucky loser:

- (Serbia) Natalija Stevanović

=== Withdrawals ===
- Margarita Betova → replaced by (Belgium) Yanina Wickmayer
- (United Kingdom) Katie Boulter → replaced by (Japan) Nao Hibino
- (Czech Republic) Marie Bouzková → replaced by (Czech Republic) Tereza Martincová
- (Italy) Camila Giorgi → replaced by (Serbia) Natalija Stevanović
- (Spain) Rebeka Masarova → replaced by (Slovakia) Viktória Hrunčáková
- (Australia) Ajla Tomljanović → replaced by (Italy) Lucrezia Stefanini
- (Ukraine) Lesia Tsurenko → replaced by (United Kingdom) Heather Watson
- (Czech Republic) Markéta Vondroušová → replaced by (United Kingdom) Jodie Burrage
- (China) Wang Xinyu → replaced by (France) Jessika Ponchet
- Vera Zvonareva → replaced by (Germany) Laura Siegemund

== Doubles main draw entrants ==
=== Seeds ===
Country	Player	Country	Player	Rank^{†}	Seed
CHN	Zhang Shuai	CHN	Zhu Lin	119	1
~~GEO~~	~~Natela Dzalamidze~~	~~ROU~~	~~Monica Niculescu~~	~~122~~	~~2~~
SVK	Viktória Hrunčáková	SVK	Tereza Mihalíková	125	3
	Lidziya Marozava		Aliaksandra Sasnovich	147	4
GBR	Alicia Barnett	GBR	Olivia Nicholls	160	5

† Rankings are as of 17 July 2023.

=== Other entrants ===
The following pairs received wildcard entry into main draw:

- (Poland) Maja Chwalińska / (France) Jessika Ponchet
- (Poland) Martyna Kubka / (Serbia) Natalija Stevanović

The following pair received entry as alternates:

- (India) Ankita Raina / (China) Yuan Yue

=== Withdrawals ===
- (Georgia (country)) Natela Dzalamidze / (Romania) Monica Niculescu → replaced by (India) Ankita Raina / (China) Yuan Yue
- (Indonesia) Priska Nugroho / (Indonesia) Jessy Rompies → replaced by (Romania) Oana Gavrilă / (Indonesia) Jessy Rompies
- (Germany) Laura Siegemund / Vera Zvonareva → replaced by (Czech Republic) Linda Fruhvirtová / (Germany) Laura Siegemund
