= 2021 WTA Poland Open – Doubles =

Doubles
- 2021 WTA Poland Open

Final
- Champions: (Kazakhstan) Anna Danilina (Belarus) Lidziya Marozava
- Runners-up: (Ukraine) Kateryna Bondarenko (Poland) Katarzyna Piter
- Score: 6–3, 6–2

Events
Singles	Doubles
WTA Poland Open	· 2022 →

This was the first edition of the tournament.

Anna Danilina and Lidziya Marozava won the title, defeating Kateryna Bondarenko and Katarzyna Piter in the final, 6–3, 6–2.

== Seeds ==
1. (Japan) Miyu Kato / (Czech Republic) Renata Voráčová (semifinals)
2. (Georgia (country)) Ekaterine Gorgodze / (Georgia (country)) Oksana Kalashnikova (semifinals)
3. (Kazakhstan) Anna Danilina / (Belarus) Lidziya Marozava (champions)
4. (Ukraine) Kateryna Bondarenko / (Poland) Katarzyna Piter (final)

== Draw ==
=== Key ===
- Q = Qualifier
- WC = Wild card
- LL = Lucky loser
- Alt = Alternate
- SE = Special exempt
- PR = Protected ranking
- ITF = ITF entry
- JE = Junior exempt
- w/o = Walkover
- r = Retired
- d = Defaulted
- SR = Special ranking

=== Draw ===
First round
1	(Japan) M Kato (Czech Republic) R Voráčová	6	3	[10]
(Uzbekistan) A Amanmuradova (Russia) M Melnikova	1	6	[6]
(Poland) M Fręch (Poland) K Kawa	6	5	[7]
(Russia) A Fomina (Croatia) T Mrdeža	3	7	[10]
3	(Kazakhstan) A Danilina (Belarus) L Marozava	6	2	[10]
WC	(Poland) W Baszak (Russia) V Flink	1	6	[7]
(Poland) A Hertel (Poland) M Kubka	6^{3}	6^{6}
(Romania) I Bara (United States) V Lepchenko	7^{7}	7^{8}
(Germany) T Morderger (Germany) Y Morderger	4	5
(United States) J Loeb (United Kingdom) E Silva	6	7
WC	(Poland) W Falkowska (Poland) P Kania-Choduń	1	6	[6]
4	(Ukraine) K Bondarenko (Poland) K Piter	6	2	[10]
(Belarus) O Govortsova (Belarus) A Sasnovich	6	5	[10]
(Germany) T Korpatsch (Slovakia) T Mihalíková	3	7	[8]
(Russia) A Anshba (Czech Republic) A Dețiuc	3	6^{5}
2	(Georgia (country)) E Gorgodze (Georgia (country)) O Kalashnikova	6	7^{7}

Quarterfinals
1	(Japan) M Kato (Czech Republic) R Voráčová	6	4	[10]
(Russia) A Fomina (Croatia) T Mrdeža	4	6	[1]
3	(Kazakhstan) A Danilina (Belarus) L Marozava	w/o
(Romania) I Bara (United States) V Lepchenko
(United States) J Loeb (United Kingdom) E Silva	2	5
4	(Ukraine) K Bondarenko (Poland) K Piter	6	7
(Belarus) O Govortsova (Belarus) A Sasnovich	6^{4}	2
2	(Georgia (country)) E Gorgodze (Georgia (country)) O Kalashnikova	7^{7}	6

Semifinals
1	(Japan) M Kato (Czech Republic) R Voráčová	4	6^{1}
3	(Kazakhstan) A Danilina (Belarus) L Marozava	6	7^{7}
4	(Ukraine) K Bondarenko (Poland) K Piter	6	1	[10]
2	(Georgia (country)) E Gorgodze (Georgia (country)) O Kalashnikova	0	6	[7]

Final
3	(Kazakhstan) A Danilina (Belarus) L Marozava	6	6
4	(Ukraine) K Bondarenko (Poland) K Piter	3	2
