= WTA Poland Open =

Tennis event located in Gdynia, Poland

Defunct tennis tournament
- Founded: 2021
- Abolished: 2023
- Location: Gdynia (2021); Warsaw (2022–2023); Poland
- Venue: Arka Tennis Club (2021); Legia Tenis & Golf (2022–2023)
- Category: WTA 125
- Surface: Hard court / outdoor
- Draw: 32S / 16SQ / 16D
- Prize money: US$ 259,302
- Website: bnpparibaspolandopen.pl

Current champions (2023)
- Women's singles: (Poland) Iga Świątek
- Women's doubles: (United Kingdom) Heather Watson (Belgium) Yanina Wickmayer

The WTA Poland Open is a tennis event located in Warsaw, Poland. The first edition of the tournament was held in July 2021 in Gdynia but in 2022 it was relocated to Warsaw. In 2023, the tournament was held on hardcourts for the first time.

Starting in 2024, the tournament was downgraded to a WTA 125 event and is held as the Polish Open in Warsaw.

== Past finals ==
=== Singles ===
Year	Champion	Runner-up	Score
↓ WTA 250 ↓
2021	(Belgium) Maryna Zanevska	(Slovakia) Kristína Kučová	6–4, 7–6^{(7–3)}
2022	(France) Caroline Garcia	(Romania) Ana Bogdan	6–4, 6–1
2023	(Poland) Iga Świątek	(Germany) Laura Siegemund	6–0, 6–1
↓ WTA 125 , see Polish Open ↓
2024	(United States) Alycia Parks	(Australia) Maya Joint	4–6, 6–3, 6–3

=== Doubles ===
Year	Champions	Runners-up	Score
↓ WTA 250 ↓
2021	(Kazakhstan) Anna Danilina (Belarus) Lidziya Marozava	(Ukraine) Kateryna Bondarenko (Poland) Katarzyna Piter	6–3, 6–2
2022	(Kazakhstan) Anna Danilina (2) (Germany) Anna-Lena Friedsam	(Poland) Katarzyna Kawa (Poland) Alicja Rosolska	6–4, 5–7, [10–5]
2023	(United Kingdom) Heather Watson (Belgium) Yanina Wickmayer	(Poland) Weronika Falkowska (Poland) Katarzyna Piter	6–4, 6–4
↓ WTA 125 ↓ see Polish Open
2024	(Poland) Weronika Falkowska (Poland) Martyna Kubka	(Switzerland) Céline Naef (Serbia) Nina Stojanović	6:4, 7:6(5)
