= 2023 WTA Poland Open – Singles =

Singles
- 2023 WTA Poland Open

Final
- Champion: (Poland) Iga Świątek
- Runner-up: (Germany) Laura Siegemund
- Score: 6–0, 6–1

Details
- Draw: 32
- Seeds: 8

Events
Singles	Doubles
- WTA Poland Open

Iga Świątek defeated Laura Siegemund in the final, 6–0, 6–1 to win the singles tennis title at the 2023 WTA Poland Open. She did not drop a set en route to her 15th WTA Tour-level title. Siegemund reached her first hard court final and first WTA Tour singles final in six years.

Caroline Garcia was the reigning champion, but chose not to defend her title.

== Seeds ==
1. (Poland) Iga Świątek (champion)
2. (Czech Republic) Karolína Muchová (second round)
3. (Czech Republic) Kateřina Siniaková (first round)
4. (China) Zhu Lin (second round)
5. (China) Zhang Shuai (first round)
6. (Italy) Camila Giorgi (withdrew)
7. (Czech Republic) Linda Fruhvirtová (first round)
8. (Czech Republic) Linda Nosková (quarterfinals)

== Draw ==
Key

- Q = Qualifier
- WC = Wild card
- LL = Lucky loser
- Alt = Alternate
- ITF = ITF entry
- PR = Protected ranking
- SR = Special ranking
- SE = Special exempt
- JE = Junior exempt
- JR = Junior Accelerator Programme entrant
- CO = College Accelerator Programme entrant
- NG = Next Gen Accelerator Program entrant
- w/o = Walkover
- r = Retired
- d = Defaulted

=== Finals ===
Semifinals
1	(Poland) Iga Świątek	6	7^{8}
(Belgium) Yanina Wickmayer	1	6^{6}
(Germany) Laura Siegemund	5	6	6
(Germany) Tatjana Maria	7	3	4

Final
1	(Poland) Iga Świątek	6	6
(Germany) Laura Siegemund	0	1

=== Top half ===
First round
1	(Poland) I Świątek	6	6
(Uzbekistan) N Abduraimova	4	3
(United States) C Liu	7^{7}	3	6
(China) Y Yuan	6^{3}	6	2
PR	(Slovakia) K Kučová	5	3
(Slovakia) V Hrunčáková	7	6
Q	(Croatia) J Fett	6	6^{4}	3
8	(Czech Republic) L Nosková	4	7^{7}	6
3	(Czech Republic) K Siniaková	5	2
(United Kingdom) H Watson	7	6
(France) J Ponchet	4	6	5
Q	Y Hatouka	6	3	7
(Japan) N Hibino	2	4
(Belgium) Y Wickmayer	6	6
(Czech Republic) T Martincová	7^{7}	6
5	(China) S Zhang	6^{3}	4

Second round
1	(Poland) I Świątek	6	6
(United States) C Liu	2	2
(Slovakia) V Hrunčáková	3	3
8	(Czech Republic) L Nosková	6	6
(United Kingdom) H Watson	6	5	6
Q	Y Hatouka	2	7	1
(Belgium) Y Wickmayer	6	6
(Czech Republic) T Martincová	2	2

Quarterfinals
1	(Poland) I Świątek	6	6
8	(Czech Republic) L Nosková	1	4
(United Kingdom) H Watson	4	3
(Belgium) Y Wickmayer	6	6

Semifinals
1	(Poland) I Świątek	6	7^{8}
(Belgium) Y Wickmayer	1	6^{6}

=== Bottom half ===
First round
7	(Czech Republic) L Fruhvirtová	1	6^{4}
(Italy) L Stefanini	6	7^{7}
Q	(India) A Raina	6	4	6^{4}
(United Kingdom) J Burrage	4	6	7^{7}
WC	(Poland) M Chwalińska	4	1
(Germany) L Siegemund	6	6
(China) Xiy Wang	4	2
4	(China) L Zhu	6	6
LL	(Serbia) N Stevanović	3	1
(Germany) T Maria	6	6
(Denmark) C Tauson	6	6
(Ukraine) D Snigur	2	3
Q	(Slovakia) R Šramková	6	6
WC	(Poland) W Ewald	2	2
A Sasnovich	6	6^{0}	3
2/WC	(Czech Republic) K Muchová	4	7^{7}	6

Second round
(Italy) L Stefanini	6	6
(United Kingdom) J Burrage	4	1
(Germany) L Siegemund	6	6
4	(China) L Zhu	4	4
(Germany) T Maria	6	6
(Denmark) C Tauson	4	0
Q	(Slovakia) R Šramková	7	3	7
2/WC	(Czech Republic) K Muchová	5	6	5

Quarterfinals
(Italy) L Stefanini	6^{5}	7	3
(Germany) L Siegemund	7^{7}	5	6
(Germany) T Maria	6	1	6
Q	(Slovakia) R Šramková	3	6	1

Semifinals
(Germany) L Siegemund	5	6	6
(Germany) T Maria	7	3	4

== Qualifying ==
=== Seeds ===
1. (Serbia) Natalija Stevanović (qualifying competition, lucky loser)
2. (Slovakia) Rebecca Šramková (qualified)
3. (India) Ankita Raina (qualified)
4. Valeria Savinykh (qualifying competition)
5. (Czech Republic) Gabriela Knutson (first round)
6. (Australia) Maddison Inglis (qualifying competition)
7. Yuliya Hatouka (qualified)
8. (Croatia) Jana Fett (qualified)

=== Qualifiers ===
1. (Croatia) Jana Fett
2. (Slovakia) Rebecca Šramková
3. (India) Ankita Raina
4. Yuliya Hatouka

=== Lucky loser ===
1. (Serbia) Natalija Stevanović

=== Qualifying draw ===
==== First qualifier ====
First round
1	(Serbia) Natalija Stevanović	2	6	6
(Thailand) Peangtarn Plipuech	6	4	2
(Poland) Weronika Falkowska	6^{4}	2
8	(Croatia) Jana Fett	7^{7}	6

Qualifying competition
1	(Serbia) Natalija Stevanović	2	7^{7}	6^{5}
8	(Croatia) Jana Fett	6	6^{4}	7^{7}

==== Second qualifier ====
First round
2	(Slovakia) Rebecca Šramková	4	6	6
(United Kingdom) Naiktha Bains	6	2	4
WC	(Poland) Martyna Kubka	4	6^{4}
6	(Australia) Maddison Inglis	6	7^{7}

Qualifying competition
2	(Slovakia) Rebecca Šramková	6	6
6	(Australia) Maddison Inglis	1	0

==== Third qualifier ====
First round
3	(India) Ankita Raina	6	6
(Poland) Olivia Lincer	3	1
(Chinese Taipei) Joanna Garland	6	6
5	(Czech Republic) Gabriela Knutson	1	2

Qualifying competition
3	(India) Ankita Raina	4	6	6
(Chinese Taipei) Joanna Garland	6	3	1

==== Fourth qualifier ====
First round
4	Valeria Savinykh	6	6
WC	(Poland) Stefania Rogozińska Dzik	0	1
(Ukraine) Kateryna Volodko	1	1
7	Yuliya Hatouka	6	6

Qualifying competition
4	Valeria Savinykh	6	4	2
7	Yuliya Hatouka	4	6	6
