= Anna Danilina =

Kazakhstani tennis player (born 1995)

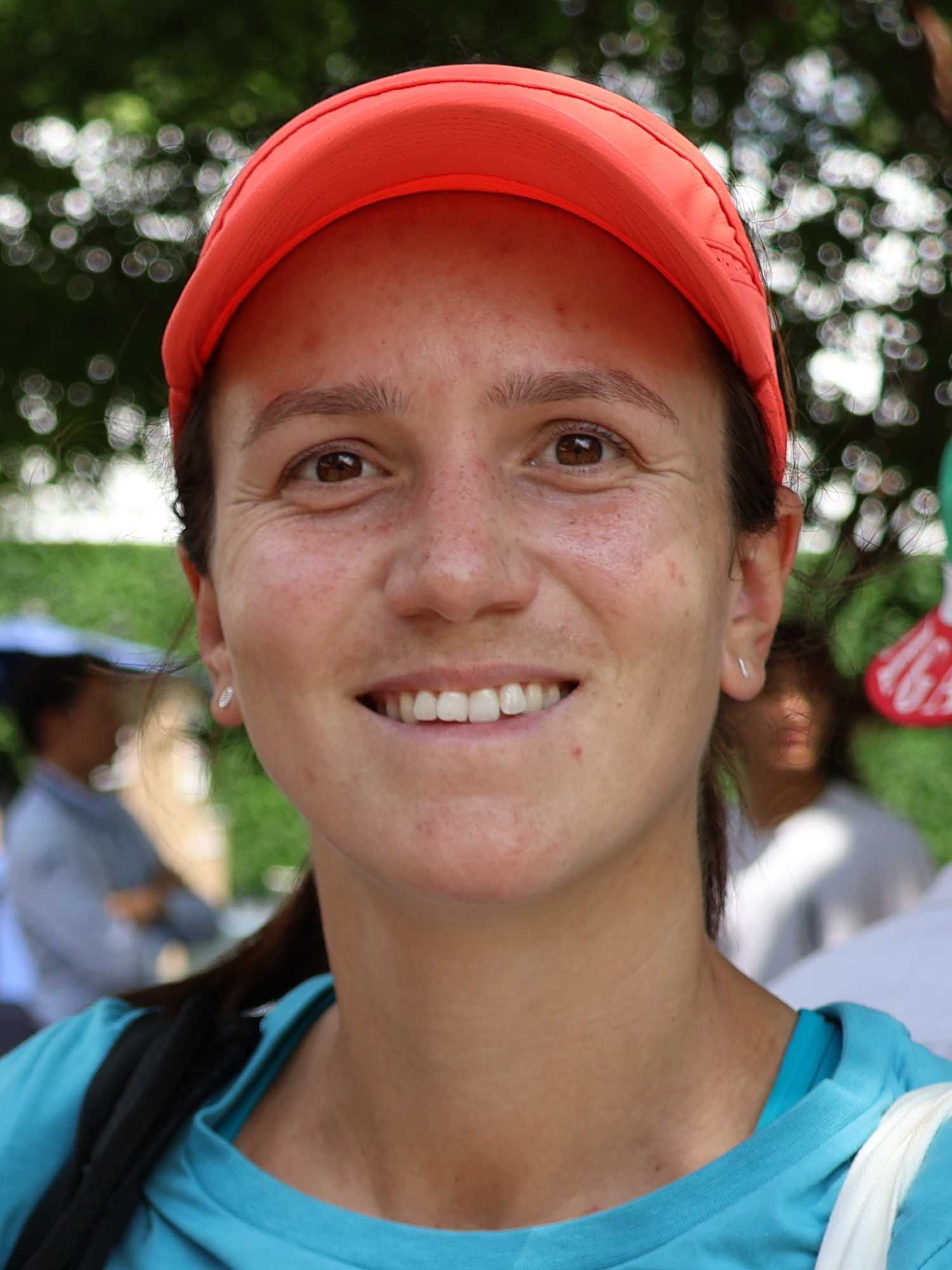
- Danilina in Washington DC, 2023
- Native name: Анна Данилина
- Country (sports): Kazakhstan (March 2011–); Russia (2009–Nov 2010)
- Born: 20 August 1995 (age 31) Moscow, Russia
- Height: 1.78 m (5 ft 10 in)
- Plays: Right (two-handed backhand)
- College: Florida
- Prize money: $2,528,480

Singles
- Career record: 168–170
- Career titles: 0
- Highest ranking: No. 269 (14 September 2020)

Doubles
- Career record: 408–238
- Career titles: 12
- Highest ranking: No. 4 (16 March 2026)
- Current ranking: No. 7 (2 November 2026)

Grand Slam doubles results
- Australian Open: F (2022, 2026)
- French Open: F (2025, 2026)
- Wimbledon: 3R (2026)
- US Open: QF (2024)

Other doubles tournaments
- Tour Finals: RR (2022)

Mixed doubles
- Career titles: 1

Grand Slam mixed doubles results
- Australian Open: QF (2026)
- French Open: QF (2026)
- Wimbledon: QF (2023)
- US Open: W (2023)

Team competitions
- Fed Cup: 6–8
Medal record
Representing Kazakhstan
Women's tennis
Asian Games
Bronze medal – third place	2026 Aichi–Nagoya	Doubles
- Last updated on: 8 November 2026.

Anna Sergeyevna Danilina (Russian: Анна Сергеевна Данилина; born 20 August 1995) is a Russian-born Kazakhstani professional tennis player who specializes in doubles. She has a career-high doubles ranking of world No. 4 by the WTA. Danilina is a Grand Slam tournament mixed-doubles champion, having won the 2023 US Open with Harri Heliövaara. In doubles, she is a finalist in the 2022 and 2026 editions of the Australian Open, with Beatriz Haddad Maia and Aleksandra Krunić, respectively. Playing with Krunić, she also reached the 2025 and 2026 French Open finals.

Danilina has won ten WTA Tour and three WTA Challenger doubles titles. She has also won one singles title and 27 doubles titles on the ITF Circuit. In singles, she reached a career-high ranking of No. 269. Danilina represented Russia, her nation of birth, until March 2011 when at the age of 15 she switched allegiance to represent Kazakhstan. As a junior, she reached a combined world ranking of No. 3 in February 2013. Along with Haddad Maia, Danilina attained her women's doubles breakthrough, reaching the final of the 2022 Australian Open, before falling to Barbora Krejčíková and Kateřina Siniaková, in three sets.

== Career ==
=== College tennis ===
With the beginning of her professional career hampered by injuries, Danilina decided in 2015 to attend an American university so she could study and play college tennis. Danilina went to University of Florida, graduating in 2018 with a degree in economics. As part of the Florida Gators women's tennis team, she won the 2017 NCAA Division I Tennis Championships.

=== Professional ===
==== 2018: ITF Circuit success ====
Partnering Berfu Cengiz, she won her first $80k tournament in July 2018 at the President's Cup, defeating Akgul Amanmuradova and Ekaterine Gorgodze in the final.

==== 2021: Major & WTA 1000 & top 100 debuts, first career doubles title ====
At the Poland Open held in Gdynia, Danilina reached the final and won her first WTA Tour doubles title, partnering with Lidziya Marozava. As a result, she made her top 100 debut in doubles at world No. 96 on 26 July 2021. Afterwards, she made her major debut at the US Open, partnering with Yaroslava Shvedova.

==== 2022: Historic Australian Open final, top 15 and WTA Finals ====
Danilina was playing an ITF tournament in Monastir, Tunisia, when Beatriz Haddad Maia invited her to serve as her partner during the Australian Open, following an injury to Nadia Podoroska. The team proved to work as they won the warm-up event Sydney International. At the 2022 Australian Open, Danilina became the first Kazakhstani woman to reach the final, upsetting second seeds Shuko Aoyama and Ena Shibahara in the semifinals. Danilina and Haddad Maia won the first set against Barbora Krejčíková and Kateřina Siniaková, but following a comeback from the Czech duo lost the final. However, with this performance, Danilina made her top-25 debut in the doubles rankings, and on 28 February 2022, she reached the top 20. Danilina and Haddad appeared in most major tournaments afterwards, but did not go further than the second round, including at the French Open.

She won two ITF titles in-between, Biarritz, partnering with Valeriya Strakhova, and Madrid, with Anastasia Tikhonova. She declined to appear at Wimbledon once the tournament was stripped of its ranking points for banning Russians and Belarusians. Afterwards, she won the Poland Open for the second time, partnering Anna-Lena Friedsam.

She also reached the final of the Cleveland Open with Aleksandra Krunić, while also reaching the quarterfinals of Cincinnati and the US Open alongside Haddad.

At the WTA 1000 Guadalajara Open, Danilina and Haddad Maia reached the final in a rematch with Krejčíková and Siniaková. Thanks to this result, she became the first Kazakhstani woman since Yaroslava Shvedova in 2016 to qualify for the WTA Finals. Thanks to this result, she also entered the world's top 15 in doubles for the first time.

==== 2023: Top 10, Wimbledon debut and mixed-doubles champion ====
She reached the top 10 in doubles on 9 January 2023 before the Australian Open.

She made her debut at Wimbledon with Xu Yifan and in mixed doubles with Nicolas Mahut as an alternate pair.

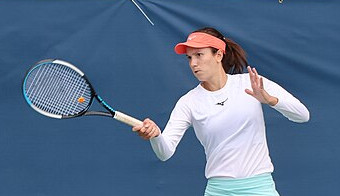
Danilina at the 2023 DC Open

At the 2023 US Open, she won the mixed doubles with Finn Harri Heliövaara, who she met at the sign-in line and decided to make a pair that wound up winning the entire event at Flushing Meadows.

==== 2024: WTA 500 singles debut and WTA 1000 title ====
She qualified into the main draw of the newly upgraded WTA 500 Monterrey Open making her singles debut at this level, losing in the first round to sixth seed and eventual champion, Linda Nosková At the same level at the Guadalajara Open, she won the doubles title with Irina Khromacheva, defeating Oksana Kalashnikova and Kamilla Rakhimova in the final in a champions tie-break. The pair also won the title at the Thailand Open, defeating Eudice Chong and Moyuka Uchijima in the final. Their good form continued as they won their first WTA 1000 title at the Wuhan Open, defeating Asia Muhammad and Jessica Pegula in the championship match.

==== 2025: French Open finalist, world No. 8 in doubles ====
At the French Open, she reached the doubles final with Aleksandra Krunić. They lost in three sets to second seeds Sara Errani and Jasmine Paolini.

==== 2026: Two major finals, world No. 4 ====
Partnering again with Krunić in doubles, Danilina reached the final of the 2026 Australian Open for the second time at the event, defeating the defending champions and top seeded pair of Kateřina Siniaková and Taylor Townsend in the quarterfinals, and the fifth seeded pair of Gabriela Dabrowski and Luisa Stefani.

== Performance timelines ==
Key
W	F	SF	QF	#R	RR	Q#	P#	DNQ	A	Z#	PO	G	S	B	NMS	NTI	P	NH

(W) winner; (F) finalist; (SF) semifinalist; (QF) quarterfinalist; (#R) rounds 4, 3, 2, 1; (RR) round-robin stage; (Q#) qualification round; (P#) preliminary round; (DNQ) did not qualify; (A) absent; (Z#) Davis/Fed Cup Zonal Group (with number indication) or (PO) play-off; (G) gold, (S) silver or (B) bronze Olympic/Paralympic medal; (NMS) not a Masters tournament; (NTI) not a Tier I tournament; (P) postponed; (NH) not held; (SR) strike rate (events won / competed); (W–L) win–loss record.
To avoid confusion and double counting, these charts are updated at the conclusion of a tournament or when the player's participation has ended.

Only main-draw results in WTA Tour, Grand Slam tournaments, Billie Jean King Cup, United Cup, Hopman Cup and Olympic Games are included in win–loss records.

=== Singles ===
Current through the 2025 Tennis in the Land.

Tournament	2019	2020	2021	2022	2023	SR	W–L	Win %
Grand Slam tournaments
Australian Open	A	A	A	A	A	0 / 0	0–0	
French Open	A	A	A	A	A	0 / 0	0–0	
Wimbledon	A	NH	A	A	A	0 / 0	0–0	
US Open	A	A	A	A	A	0 / 0	0–0	
Win–loss	0–0	0–0	0–0	0–0	0–0	0 / 0	0–0	
WTA 1000 tournaments
Qatar Open	NTI	Q1	NTI	Q1	NTI	0 / 0	0–0	
Dubai Championships	A	NTI	A	NTI	Q1	0 / 0	0–0	
Guadalajara Open	NH			Q1		0 / 0	0–0	
Career statistics
Tournaments	1	0	3	1	0	Career total: 5		
Overall win–loss	0–1	0–0	0–3	0–1	0–0	0 / 5	0–5	
Year-end ranking	309	278	341	517	814	$583,141		

=== Doubles ===
Current through the 2026 Australian Open.

Tournament	2019	2020	2021	2022	2023	2024	2025	2026	SR	W–L	Win%
Grand Slam tournaments
Australian Open	A	A	A	F	2R	1R	1R	F	0 / 5	11–4	73%
French Open	A	A	A	2R	2R	1R	F	F	0 / 5	12–5	71%
Wimbledon	A	NH	A	A	1R	2R	2R	3R	0 / 4	4–4	50%
US Open	A	A	1R	3R	2R	QF	QF	2R	0 / 6	9–6	62%
Win–loss	0–0	0–0	0–1	8–3	3–4	4–4	8–4	13–4	0 / 20	36–20	65%
Year-end championships
WTA Finals	DNQ			RR	DNQ			A	0 / 1	1–2	33%
WTA 1000 tournaments
Qatar Open	NTI	A	NTI	2R	NTI	1R	QF	W	1 / 4	7–3	0%
Dubai Championships	A	NTI	A	NTI	1R	2R	2R	SF	0 / 4	4–4	0%
Indian Wells Open	A	NH	A	1R	1R	1R	1R	F	0 / 5	4–5	0%
Miami Open	A	NH	A	1R	2R	1R	1R	1R	0 / 5	1–5	20%
Madrid Open	A	NH	A	1R	1R	A	2R	1R	0 / 4	1–4	25%
Italian Open	A	A	A	2R	QF	1R	1R	QF	0 / 5	4–5	33%
Canadian Open	A	NH	A	A	1R	2R	2R	1R	0 / 4	2–3	50%
Cincinnati Open	A	A	1R	QF	1R	1R	1R	2R	0 / 6	3–5	33%
China Open	A	NH			1R	1R	QF	2R	0 / 4	3–4	40%
Wuhan Open	A	NH				W	F	QF	1 / 3	9–2	90%
Guadalajara Open	NH			F	1R	Not Tier I			0 / 2	4–2	67%
Career statistics
Tournaments	6	2	13	24	26	25	25	14	Career total: 135		
Titles	0	0	1	2	1	5	2	1	Career total: 12		
Finals	0	0	1	5	1	8	8	3	Career total: 26		
Overall win–loss	2–6	1–2	11–12	33–26	15–25	38–21	43–24	30–14	11 / 135	173–130	57%
Year-end ranking	124	135	83	11	56	22	15				

== Grand Slam tournaments finals ==
=== Doubles: 4 (4 runner-ups) ===
Result	Year	Tournament	Surface	Partner	Opponents	Score
Loss	2022	Australian Open	Hard	(Brazil) Beatriz Haddad Maia	(Czech Republic) Barbora Krejčíková (Czech Republic) Kateřina Siniaková	7–6^{(7–3)}, 4–6, 4–6
Loss	2025	French Open	Clay	(Serbia) Aleksandra Krunić	(Italy) Sara Errani (Italy) Jasmine Paolini	4–6, 6–2, 1–6
Loss	2026	Australian Open	Hard	(Serbia) Aleksandra Krunić	(Belgium) Elise Mertens (China) Zhang Shuai	6–7^{(4–7)}, 4–6
Loss	2026	French Open	Clay	(Serbia) Aleksandra Krunić	(Czech Republic) Kateřina Siniaková (United States) Taylor Townsend	2–6, 5–7

=== Mixed doubles: 1 (title) ===
Result	Year	Tournament	Surface	Partner	Opponents	Score
Win	2023	US Open	Hard	(Finland) Harri Heliövaara	(United States) Jessica Pegula (United States) Austin Krajicek	6–3, 6–4

== Other significant finals ==
=== WTA 1000 tournaments ===
==== Doubles: 5 (2 titles, 3 runner-ups) ====
Result	Year	Tournament	Surface	Partner	Opponents	Score
Loss	2022	Guadalajara Open	Hard	(Brazil) Beatriz Haddad Maia	(Australia) Storm Sanders (Brazil) Luisa Stefani	6–7^{(4–7)}, 7–6^{(7–2)}, [8–10]
Win	2024	Wuhan Open	Hard	Irina Khromacheva	(United States) Asia Muhammad (United States) Jessica Pegula	6–3, 7–6^{(8–6)}
Loss	2025	Wuhan Open	Hard	(Serbia) Aleksandra Krunić	(Czech Republic) Kateřina Siniaková (Australia) Storm Hunter	3–6, 2–6
Win	2026	Qatar Ladies Open	Hard	(Serbia) Aleksandra Krunić	(Chinese Taipei) Hsieh Su-wei (Latvia) Jeļena Ostapenko	0–6, 7–6^{(7–3)}, [10–8]
Loss	2026	Indian Wells Open	Hard	(Serbia) Aleksandra Krunić	(Czech Republic) Kateřina Siniaková (United States) Taylor Townsend	6–7^{(4–7)}, 4–6

== WTA Tour finals ==
=== Doubles: 25 (12 titles, 14 runner-ups) ===
Legend Grand Slam (0–4) WTA 1000 (2–3) WTA 500 (2–3) WTA 250 (8–4)	Finals by surface Hard (7–8) Clay (4–4) Grass (1–2)	Finals by setting Outdoors (12–14)

Result	W–L	Date	Tournament	Tier	Surface	Partner	Opponents	Score
Win	1–0	Jul 2021	Poland Open, Poland	WTA 250	Clay	(Belarus) Lidziya Marozava	(Ukraine) Kateryna Bondarenko (Poland) Katarzyna Piter	6–3, 6–2
Win	2–0	Jan 2022	Sydney International, Australia	WTA 500	Hard	(Brazil) Beatriz Haddad Maia	(Germany) Vivian Heisen (Hungary) Panna Udvardy	4–6, 7–5, [10–8]
Loss	2–1	Jan 2022	Australian Open, Australia	Grand Slam	Hard	(Brazil) Beatriz Haddad Maia	(Czech Republic) Barbora Krejčíková (Czech Republic) Kateřina Siniaková	7–6^{(7–3)}, 4–6, 4–6
Win	3–1	Jul 2022	Poland Open, Poland (2)	WTA 250	Clay	(Germany) Anna-Lena Friedsam	(Poland) Katarzyna Kawa (Poland) Alicja Rosolska	6–4, 5–7, [10–5]
Loss	3–2	Aug 2022	Tennis in Cleveland, US	WTA 250	Hard	(Serbia) Aleksandra Krunić	(United States) Nicole Melichar-Martinez (Australia) Ellen Perez	5–7, 3–6
Loss	3–3	Oct 2022	Guadalajara Open, Mexico	WTA 1000	Hard	(Brazil) Beatriz Haddad Maia	(Australia) Storm Sanders (Brazil) Luisa Stefani	6–7^{(4–7)}, 7–6^{(7–2)}, [8–10]
Win	4–3	Jul 2023	Hamburg European Open, Germany	WTA 250	Clay	Alexandra Panova	(Czech Republic) Miriam Kolodziejová (United States) Angela Kulikov	6–4, 6–2
Win	5–3	Jan 2024	Auckland Open, New Zealand	WTA 250	Hard	(Slovakia) Viktória Hrunčáková	(Czech Republic) Marie Bouzková (United States) Bethanie Mattek-Sands	6–3, 6–7^{(5–7)}, [10–8]
Loss	5–4	May 2024	Rabat Grand Prix, Morocco	WTA 250	Clay	(China) Xu Yifan	Irina Khromacheva; Yana Sizikova	3–6, 2–6
Loss	5–5	Jul 2024	Budapest Grand Prix, Hungary	WTA 250	Clay	Irina Khromacheva	(Hungary) Fanny Stollár (Poland) Katarzyna Piter	3–6, 6–3, [3–10]
Win	6–5	Jul 2024	Iași Open, Romania	WTA 250	Clay	Irina Khromacheva	Alexandra Panova; Yana Sizikova	6–4, 6–2
Win	7–5	Sep 2024	Guadalajara Open, Mexico	WTA 500	Hard	Irina Khromacheva	(Georgia (country)) Oksana Kalashnikova; Kamilla Rakhimova	2–6, 7–5, [10–7]
Win	8–5	Sep 2024	Hua Hin Championships, Thailand	WTA 250	Hard	Irina Khromacheva	(Hong Kong) Eudice Chong (Japan) Moyuka Uchijima	6–4, 7–5
Win	9–5	Oct 2024	Wuhan Open, China	WTA 1000	Hard	Irina Khromacheva	(United States) Asia Muhammad (United States) Jessica Pegula	6–3, 7–6^{(8–6)}
Loss	9–6	Mar 2025	Mérida Open, Mexico	WTA 500	Hard	Irina Khromacheva	(Poland) Katarzyna Piter (Egypt) Mayar Sherif	6–7^{(2–7)}, 5–7
Loss	9–7	Jun 2025	French Open, France	Grand Slam	Clay	(Serbia) Aleksandra Krunić	(Italy) Sara Errani (Italy) Jasmine Paolini	4–6, 6–2, 1–6
Loss	9–8	Jun 2025	Queen's Club Championships, UK	WTA 500	Grass	Diana Shnaider	(United States) Asia Muhammad (Netherlands) Demi Schuurs	5–7, 7–6^{(7–3)}, [4-10]
Loss	9–9	Jun 2025	Nottingham Open, United Kingdom	WTA 250	Grass	(Japan) Ena Shibahara	(Germany) Laura Siegemund (Brazil) Beatriz Haddad Maia	3–6, 2–6
Win	10–9	Jun 2025	Eastbourne Open, United Kingdom	WTA 250	Grass	(Czech Republic) Marie Bouzková	(Chinese Taipei) Hsieh Su-wei (Australia) Maya Joint	6–4, 7–5
Win	11–9	Aug 2025	Tennis in Cleveland, US	WTA 250	Hard	(Serbia) Aleksandra Krunić	(Chinese Taipei) Chan Hao-ching (China) Jiang Xinyu	7–6^{(7–3)}, 6–4
Loss	11–10	Oct 2025	Wuhan Open, China	WTA 1000	Hard	(Serbia) Aleksandra Krunić	(Czech Republic) Kateřina Siniaková (Australia) Storm Hunter	3–6, 2–6
Loss	11–11	Oct 2025	Pan Pacific Open, Japan	WTA 500	Hard	(Serbia) Aleksandra Krunić	(Hungary) Tímea Babos (Brazil) Luisa Stefani	1–6, 4–6
Loss	11–12	Jan 2026	Australian Open, Australia	Grand Slam	Hard	(Serbia) Aleksandra Krunić	(Belgium) Elise Mertens (China) Zhang Shuai	6–7^{(4–7)}, 4–6
Win	12–12	Feb 2026	Qatar Open, Qatar	WTA 1000	Hard	(Serbia) Aleksandra Krunić	(Chinese Taipei) Hsieh Su-wei (Latvia) Jeļena Ostapenko	0–6, 7–6^{(7–3)}, [10–8]
Loss	12–13	Mar 2026	Indian Wells Open, US	WTA 1000	Hard	(Serbia) Aleksandra Krunić	(Czech Republic) Kateřina Siniaková (United States) Taylor Townsend	6–7^{(4–7)}, 4–6
Loss	12–14	Jun 2026	French Open, France	Grand Slam	Clay	(Serbia) Aleksandra Krunić	(Czech Republic) Kateřina Siniaková (United States) Taylor Townsend	2–6, 5–7

== WTA 125 finals ==
=== Doubles: 4 (3 titles, 1 runner-up) ===
Result	W–L	Date	Tournament	Surface	Partner	Opponents	Score
Win	1–0	May 2023	Clarins Open Paris, France	Clay	Vera Zvonareva	(Ukraine) Nadiia Kichenok (United States) Alycia Parks	5–7, 7–6^{(7–2)}, [14–12]
Loss	1–1	Dec 2023	Open Angers, France	Hard (i)	Alexandra Panova	(Spain) Cristina Bucșa (Romania) Monica Niculescu	1–6, 3–6
Win	2–1	May 2024	Parma Open, Italy	Clay	Irina Khromacheva	(France) Elixane Lechemia (Brazil) Ingrid Martins	6–1, 6–2
Win	3–1	Jun 2024	Bari Open, Italy	Clay	Irina Khromacheva	(Italy) Angelica Moratelli (Mexico) Renata Zarazúa	6–1, 6–3

== ITF Circuit finals ==
=== Singles: 6 (1 title, 5 runner-ups) ===
Legend $25,000 tournaments (0–5) $10,000 tournaments (1–0)	Finals by surface Hard (0–1) Clay (1–4)

Result	W–L	Date	Tournament	Tier	Surface	Opponent	Score
Win	1–0	Apr 2012	Wiesbaden Open, Germany	10,000	Clay	(Germany) Laura Siegemund	7–6^{(7–2)}, 7–6^{(7–4)}
Loss	1–1	Sep 2012	ITF Shymkent, Kazakhstan	25,000	Hard	(Ukraine) Kateryna Kozlova	3–6, 6–4, 4–6
Loss	1–2	Sep 2018	ITF Almaty, Kazakhstan	25,000	Clay	(Belarus) Yuliya Hatouka	4–6, 7–6^{(7–1)}, 2–6
Loss	1–3	May 2019	ITF Caserta, Italy	25,000	Clay	(Russia) Varvara Gracheva	3–6, 5–7
Loss	1–4	Aug 2019	ITF Sezze, Italy	25,000	Clay	(Italy) Stefania Rubini	4–6, 1–6
Loss	1–5	Sep 2021	ITF Saint-Palais-sur-Mer, France	25,000	Clay	(France) Amandine Hesse	3–6, 4–6

=== Doubles: 38 (27 titles, 11 runner-ups) ===
Legend $100,000 tournaments (4–1) $80,000 tournaments (1–1) $60,000 tournaments (6–3) $40,000 tournaments (1–0) $25,000 tournaments (13–6) $10/15,000 tournaments (2–0)	Finals by surface Hard (9–5) Clay (18–6)

Result	W–L	Date	Tournament	Tier	Surface	Partner	Opponents	Score
Win	1–0	Oct 2011	ITF Almaty, Kazakhstan	10,000	Hard (i)	(Kazakhstan) Kamila Kerimbayeva	(Czech Republic) Nikola Fraňková (Kazakhstan) Zalina Khairudinova	6–3, 6–1
Win	2–0	Jun 2013	ITF Kristinehamn, Sweden	25,000	Clay	(Russia) Olga Doroshina	(United States) Julia Cohen (France) Alizé Lim	7–5, 6–3
Loss	2–1	Nov 2013	ITF Minsk, Belarus	25,000	Hard (i)	(Russia) Olga Doroshina	(Belarus) Ilona Kremen (Belarus) Aliaksandra Sasnovich	6–7^{(3)}, 0–6
Win	3–1	Mar 2014	ITF Astana, Kazakhstan	10,000	Hard (i)	(Russia) Olga Doroshina	(Kazakhstan) Alexandra Grinchishina (Ukraine) Kateryna Sliusar	6–3, 7–6^{(4)}
Win	4–1	May 2014	ITF Moscow, Russia	25,000	Clay	(Switzerland) Xenia Knoll	(Russia) Ekaterina Bychkova (Russia) Evgeniya Rodina	6–3, 6–2
Loss	4–2	Jun 2014	ITF Ystad, Sweden	25,000	Clay	(Switzerland) Xenia Knoll	(Slovenia) Nastja Kolar (Austria) Yvonne Neuwirth	6–7^{(3)}, 6–3, [6–10]
Win	5–2	Sep 2014	ITF Moscow, Russia	25,000	Clay	(Switzerland) Xenia Knoll	(Russia) Valentyna Ivakhnenko (Russia) Yuliya Kalabina	6–1, 4–6, [10–6]
Win	6–2	Jun 2018	ITF Naples, United States	25,000	Clay	(Australia) Genevieve Lorbergs	(United States) Rasheeda McAdoo (United States) Katerina Stewart	6–3, 1–6, [11–9]
Loss	6–3	Jun 2018	ITF Båstad, Sweden	25,000	Clay	(Switzerland) Karin Kennel	(Chinese Taipei) Chen Pei-hsuan (Chinese Taipei) Wu Fang-hsien	5–7, 6–1, [5–10]
Win	7–3	Jul 2018	President's Cup, Kazakhstan	80,000	Hard	(Turkey) Berfu Cengiz	(Uzbekistan) Akgul Amanmuradova (Georgia (country)) Ekaterine Gorgodze	3–6, 6–3, [10–7]
Loss	7–4	Aug 2018	ITF Woking, United Kingdom	25,000	Hard	(United Kingdom) Emily Arbuthnott	(Hungary) Dalma Gálfi (Greece) Valentini Grammatikopoulou	0–6, 6–4, [9–11]
Win	8–4	Oct 2018	ITF Florence, United States	25,000	Hard	(Norway) Ulrikke Eikeri	(United Kingdom) Tara Moore (Switzerland) Conny Perrin	6–7^{(9)}, 6–2, [10–8]
Loss	8–5	Oct 2018	Tennis Classic of Macon, United States	80,000	Hard	(United States) Ingrid Neel	(United States) Caty McNally (United States) Jessica Pegula	1–6, 7–5, [9–11]
Loss	8–6	Nov 2018	ITF Lawrence, United States	25,000	Hard (i)	(Russia) Ksenia Laskutova	(Montenegro) Vladica Babić (United States) Ena Shibahara	4–6, 2–6
Win	9–6	Jun 2019	Grado Tennis Cup, Italy	25,000	Clay	(Hungary) Réka Luca Jani	(Uzbekistan) Akgul Amanmuradova (Romania) Cristina Dinu	6–2, 6–3
Win	10–6	Jun 2019	ITF Ystad, Sweden	25,000	Clay	(United Kingdom) Emily Arbuthnott	(North Macedonia) Lina Gjorcheska (Russia) Anastasiya Komardina	3–6, 6–2, [10–4]
Loss	10–7	Jul 2019	Contrexéville Open, France	100,000	Clay	(Netherlands) Eva Wacanno	(Spain) Georgina García Pérez (Georgia (country)) Oksana Kalashnikova	3–6, 3–6
Win	11–7	Aug 2019	ITF Sezze, Italy	25,000	Clay	(Russia) Ekaterina Yashina	(Italy) Nuria Brancaccio (Italy) Federica Sacco	7–5, 6–4
Loss	11–8	Aug 2019	ITF Leipzig, Germany	25,000	Clay	(Germany) Vivian Heisen	(Czech Republic) Petra Krejsová (Czech Republic) Jesika Malečková	6–4, 3–6, [6–10]
Loss	11–9	Sep 2019	Caldas da Rainha Open, Portugal	60,000	Hard	(Germany) Vivian Heisen	(France) Jessika Ponchet (Bulgaria) Isabella Shinikova	1–6, 3–6
Win	12–9	Oct 2019	ITF Charleston Pro, United States	60,000	Clay	(United States) Ingrid Neel	(Montenegro) Vladica Babić (United States) Caitlin Whoriskey	6–1, 6–1
Win	13–9	Oct 2019	ITF Hilton Head, United States	25,000	Clay	(United States) Ingrid Neel	(United States) Katharine Fahey (United States) Elizabeth Halbauer	6–3, 6–2
Win	14–9	Oct 2019	Waco Showdown, United States	25,000	Clay	(Montenegro) Vladica Babić	(United States) Savannah Broadus (United States) Vanessa Ong	6–3, 6–2
Loss	14–10	Nov 2019	Asunción Open, Paraguay	60,000	Clay	(Switzerland) Conny Perrin	(Venezuela) Andrea Gámiz (Spain) Georgina García Pérez	4–6, 6–3, [3–10]
Loss	14–11	Nov 2019	Copa Colina, Chile	60,000	Clay	(Switzerland) Conny Perrin	(United States) Hayley Carter (Brazil) Luisa Stefani	7–5, 3–6, [6–10]
Win	15–11	Apr 2021	Bellinzona Ladies Open, Switzerland	60,000	Clay	(Georgia (country)) Ekaterine Gorgodze	(Canada) Rebecca Marino (Japan) Yuki Naito	7–5, 6–3
Win	16–11	May 2021	Charlottesville Open, United States	60,000	Clay	(Australia) Arina Rodionova	(New Zealand) Erin Routliffe (Indonesia) Aldila Sutjiadi	6–1, 6–3
Win	17–11	Jun 2021	Open Denain, France	25,000	Clay	(Ukraine) Valeriya Strakhova	(Hungary) Dalma Gálfi (Argentina) Paula Ormaechea	7–5, 3–6, [10–4]
Win	18–11	Jul 2021	Contrexéville Open, France	100,000	Clay	(Norway) Ulrikke Eikeri	(Hungary) Dalma Gálfi (Belgium) Kimberley Zimmermann	6–0, 1–6, [10–4]
Win	19–11	Aug 2021	Reinert Open Versmold, Germany	60,000	Clay	(Ukraine) Valeriya Strakhova	(Sweden) Mirjam Björklund (Australia) Jaimee Fourlis	4–6, 7–5, [10–4]
Win	20–11	Sep 2021	ITF Saint-Palais-sur-Mer, France	25,000	Clay	(Ukraine) Valeriya Strakhova	(France) Audrey Albié (France) Léolia Jeanjean	6–7^{(7)}, 6–2, [10–4]
Win	21–11	Nov 2021	Dubai Tennis Challenge, U.A.E.	100,000+H	Hard	(Slovakia) Viktória Kužmová	(Russia) Angelina Gabueva (Russia) Anastasia Zakharova	4–6, 6–3, [10–2]
Win	22–11	Jun 2022	Open de Biarritz, France	60,000	Clay	(Ukraine) Valeriya Strakhova	(Argentina) María Lourdes Carlé; Maria Timofeeva	2–6, 6–3, [14–12]
Win	23–11	Jun 2022	Open ITF Madrid, Spain	60,000	Hard	Anastasia Tikhonova	(China) Lu Jiajing (China) You Xiaodi	6–4, 6–2
Win	24–11	Jul 2022	Reinert Open Versmold, Germany	100,000	Clay	(Netherlands) Arianne Hartono	(India) Ankita Raina (Netherlands) Rosalie van der Hoek	6–7^{(4)}, 6–4, [10–6]
Win	25–11	Aug 2022	Landisville Tennis Challenge, US	100,000	Hard	(United States) Sophie Chang	(South Korea) Han Na-lae (South Korea) Jang Su-jeong	2–6, 7–6^{(4)}, [11–9]
Win	26–11	Sep 2022	ITF Jablonec nad Nisou, Czech Rep.	25,000	Clay	(Ukraine) Valeriya Strakhova	(Germany) Lena Papadakis (Czech Republic) Anna Sisková	7–5, 6–1
Win	27–11	Mar 2023	ITF Astana, Kazakhstan	40,000	Hard (i)	Iryna Shymanovich	(South Korea) Han Na-lae (South Korea) Jang Su-jeong	6–4, 6–7^{(8)}, [10–7]
