= Legia Tennis Centre =

Tennis venue in Warsaw, Poland

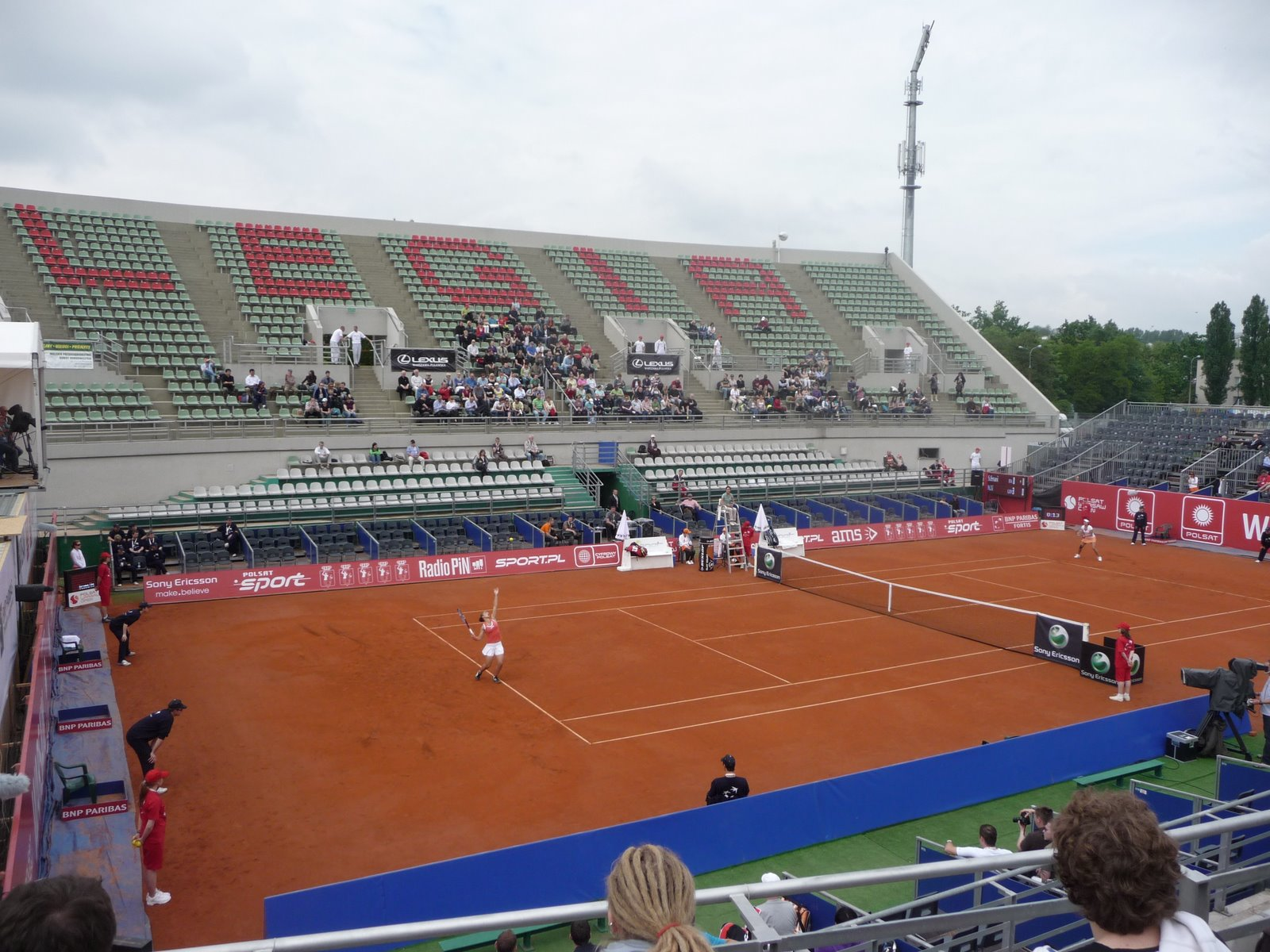
- Interactive map of Legia Tennis Centre
- Location: Warsaw, Poland
- Coordinates: 52.197208°N 21.027639°E
- Capacity: 4,000 (tennis)
- Surface: Hard court, Outdoors

Tenant
- Warsaw Open (premier) (present)

The Legia Tennis Centre is a tennis complex in Warsaw, Poland. The complex was the host of the annual premier event, the Warsaw Open. The stadium court has a capacity of 4,000 people.

== See also ==
- List of tennis stadiums by capacity

== Gallery ==
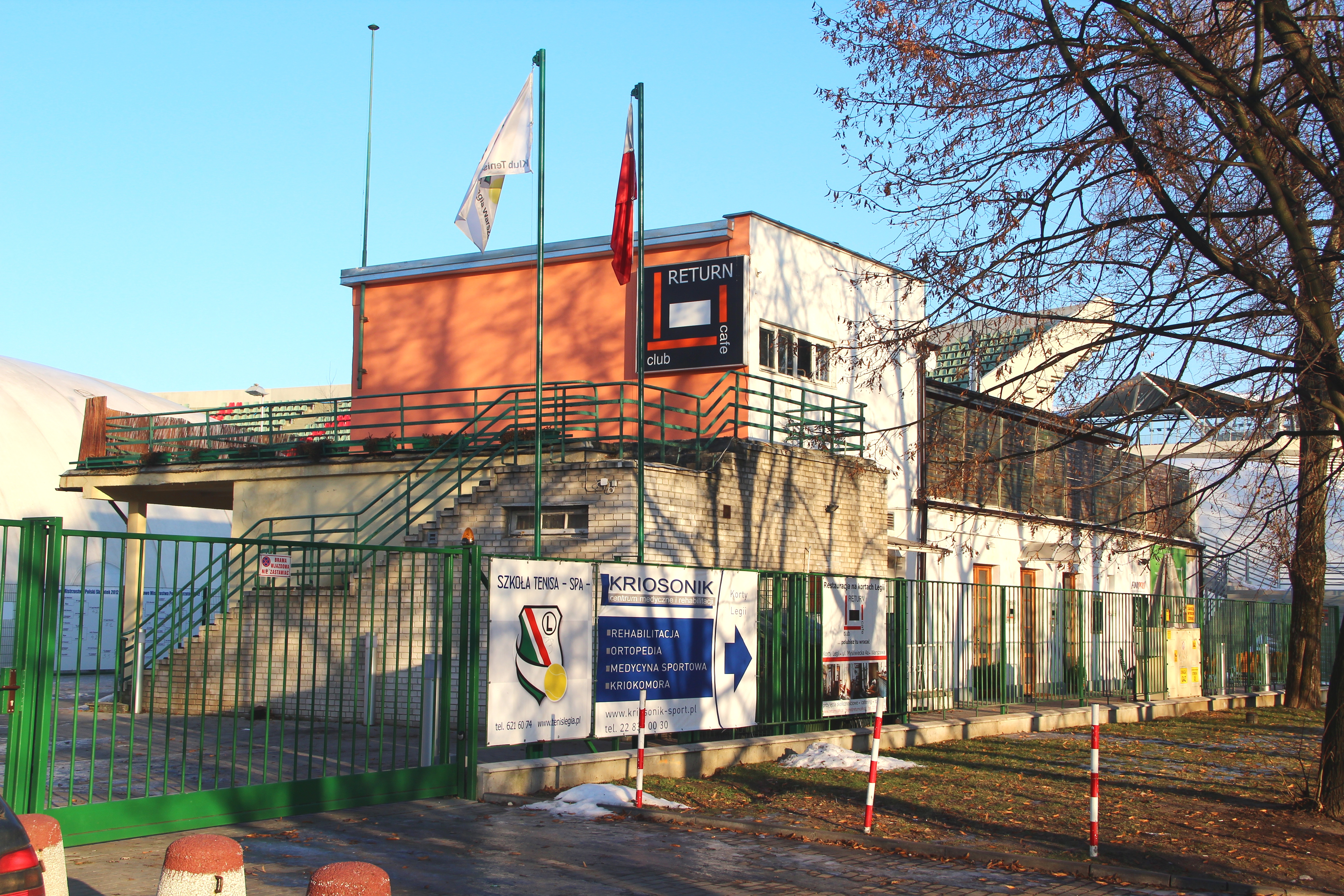
Legia Tennis Centre

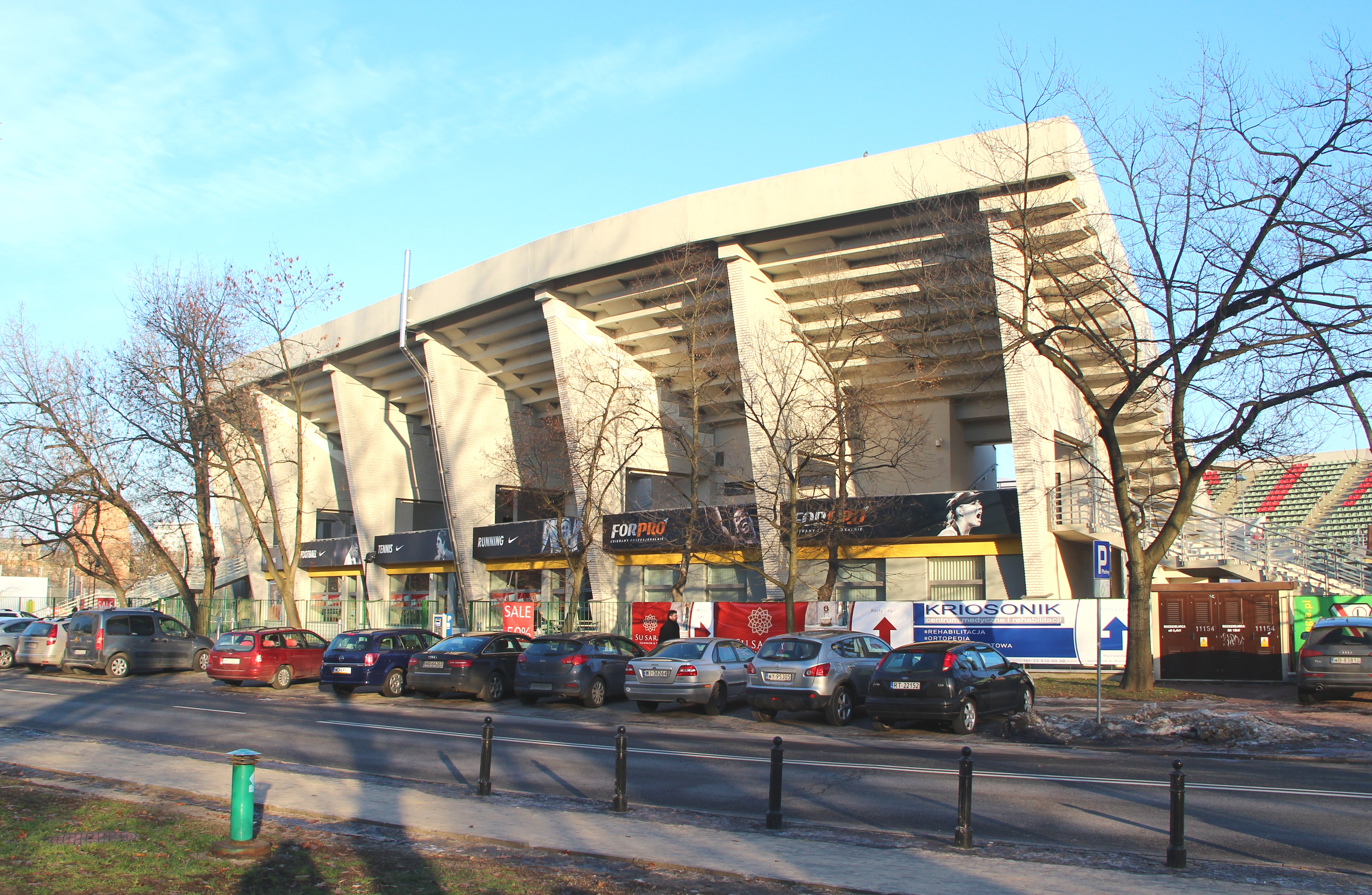
Tennis Centre

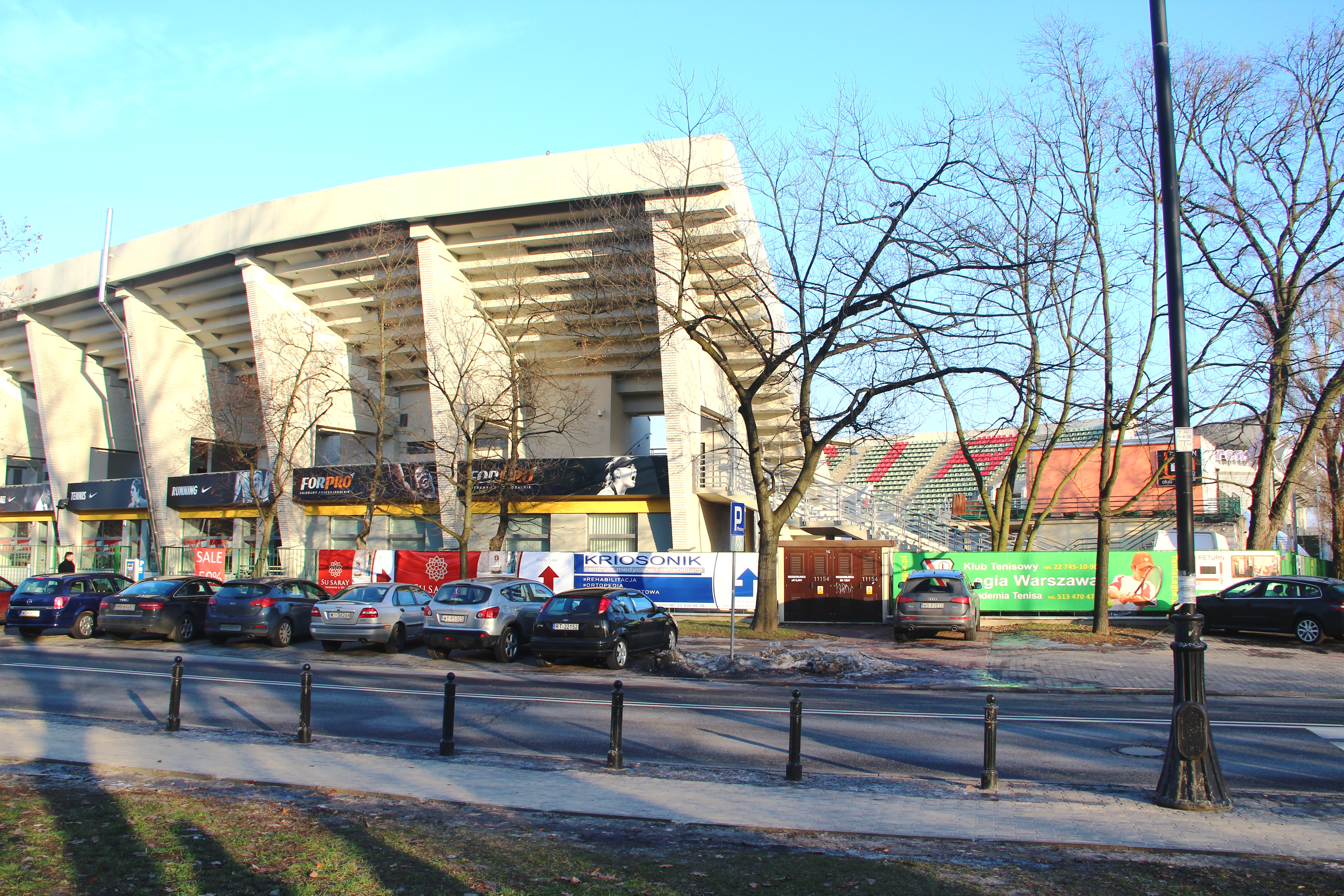
Tennis Centre

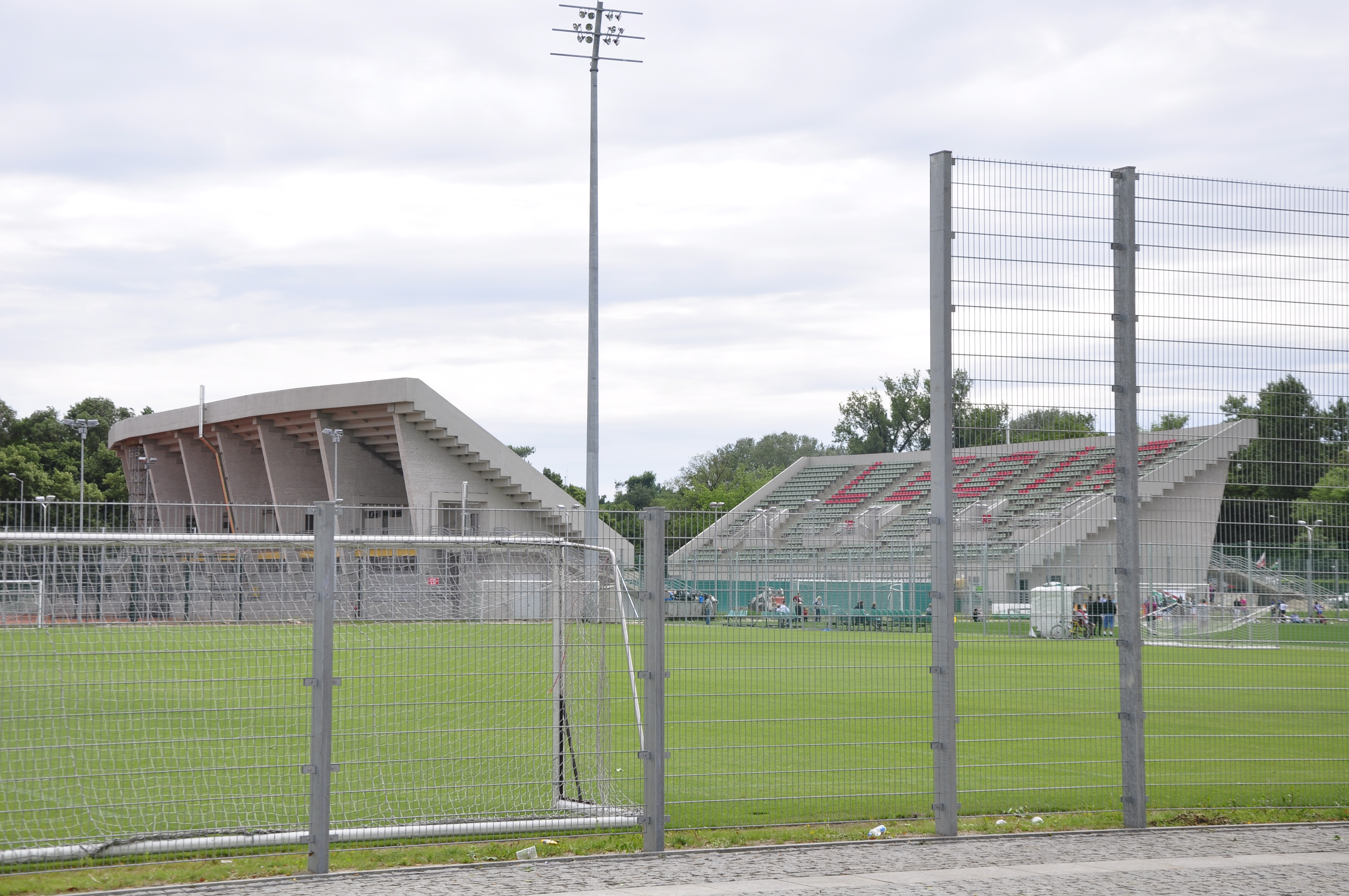
Legia Tennis Centre
