= 2023 WTA Elite Trophy =

- Date: 24–29 October
- Edition: 6th
- Draw: 12S/6D
- Surface: Hard / Outdoor / Covered Court
- Location: Zhuhai, China
- Venue: Hengqin Tennis Center, Zhuhai

Champions

Singles
- (Brazil) Beatriz Haddad Maia

Doubles
- (Brazil) Beatriz Haddad Maia / Veronika Kudermetova
← 2019 ·	WTA Elite Trophy

The 2023 WTA Elite Trophy was a women's tennis tournament played at the Hengqin International Tennis Center in Zhuhai, China. It was the sixth edition of the singles event and doubles competition, and the first since 2019, after the intervening editions were canceled due to the COVID-19 pandemic in mainland China. The tournament was contested by 12 singles players and six doubles teams.

That year, Beatriz Haddad Maia made history as the first—and so far, only— player to have won both singles and doubles titles at the WTA Elite Trophy and also to do so in the same edition of the tournament.

== Champions ==
=== Singles ===
- (Brazil) Beatriz Haddad Maia def. (China) Zheng Qinwen 7–6^{(13–11)}, 7–6^{(7–4)}

=== Doubles ===
- (Brazil) Beatriz Haddad Maia / Veronika Kudermetova def. (Japan) Miyu Kato / (Indonesia) Aldila Sutjiadi 6–3, 6–3

== Tournament ==
=== Qualifying ===
WTA Elite Trophy is an invitation-only event.

==== Singles qualifying ====
The field consists of the top 11 players not already qualified for the 2023 WTA Finals, plus either (a) the 12th-player not qualified for 2023 WTA Finals, or (b) a wild card. The final two alternates for the 2023 WTA Finals are eligible to play in WTA Elite Trophy even if they will participate in the WTA Finals. Point totals were calculated by combining points obtained from 16 tournaments. Of these 16 tournaments, a player's results from the four Grand Slam events, four out of the five WTA 1000 Mandatory tournaments, and (for Top 20 players at the end of 2022) the best results from two WTA 1000 non-Mandatory tournaments have to be included.

==== Doubles qualifying ====
Two teams composed of players that did not compete in the WTA Finals singles (except Finals Alternates) or doubles competitions, using the players’ combined doubles rankings as of the Monday after the final regular-season Tournament of the current Tour Year to determine the order of acceptance; and up to two teams composed of players that did not qualify to compete in the WTA Finals singles (except Finals Alternates) or doubles competitions and that include at least one Elite Trophy Singles Qualified Player or Elite Trophy Alternate, using the higher of the players’ combined singles or doubles rankings as of the Monday after the final regular-season Tournament of the current Tour Year to determine the order of acceptance. Plus two wild cards. For each wild card not given out, the next highest pair of players would become a participant.

=== Format ===
The singles event featured 12 players in a round robin event, split into four groups of three. Over the first four days of competition, each player met the other two players in her group, with the winner in each group advancing to the semifinal. The winners of each semifinal met in the championship match. The six doubles teams were split into two round robin groups, with the winner of each advancing to the final.

==== Round robin tie-breaking methods ====
The final standings of each group were determined by the first of the following methods that apply:

1. Greatest number of wins.
2. Greatest number of matches played.
3. In case of a 2-way tie:
  - Head-to-head results
4. In case of a 3-way tie:
  - Percentage of sets won
    - Head-to-head results
  - Percentage of games won
    - Head-to-head results
  - Finals Rankings

=== Global Ambassador ===
Yet to be announced.

== Prize money and points in 2023 ==
The total prize money for the 2023 WTA Elite Trophy Zhuhai is US$2,600,000.

Stage	Singles		Doubles^{2}
Stage	Prize money	Points	Prize money
Champion	RR^{1} + $515,000	RR + 460	RR^{1} + $22,000
Runner-up	RR + $155,000	RR + 200	RR^{1} + $11,346
Semifinalist loss	RR + $15,000	RR	—
Round robin win per match	1st win +$50,000; 2nd win +$40,000	120	+$5,500
Round robin loss per match	—	40	—
Round robin first place	+$69,500	—	—
Round robin second place	+$32,000	—	—
Participation Fee	$46,500	—	$17,080
Alternates	$10,000	—	—

- ^{1} RR means prize money or points won in the round robin.
- ^{2} Doubles doesn't award ranking points

== Qualified players ==
=== Singles ===
Seeds	Players	Points	Tours
1	(Czech Republic) Barbora Krejčíková	2,775	20
2	(United States) Madison Keys	2,737	17
3	(Latvia) Jeļena Ostapenko	2,615	22
4	Liudmila Samsonova	2,545	23
5	Veronika Kudermetova	2,460	24
6	Daria Kasatkina	2,410	24
7	(China) Zheng Qinwen	2,275	22
8	(Brazil) Beatriz Haddad Maia	2,210	22
9	(France) Caroline Garcia	2,035	26
10	(Croatia) Donna Vekić	1,815	20
11	(Poland) Magda Linette	1,811	23
12/WC	(China) Zhu Lin	1,272	23

=== Doubles ===
Country	Player	Country	Player	Rank^{1}
BRA	Beatriz Haddad Maia		Veronika Kudermetova	35
JPN	Miyu Kato	INA	Aldila Sutjiadi	60
NOR	Ulrikke Eikeri	UKR	Lyudmyla Kichenok	67
GEO	Oksana Kalashnikova		Yana Sizikova	104

- ^{1} Rankings as of 16 October 2023.

==== Other entrants ====
The following pairs received wildcards into the doubles draw:

- (China) Xu Yifan / (China) Wang Xiyu
- (China) Jiang Xinyu / (China) Tang Qianhui

== Points breakdown ==
=== Singles ===
Player qualified for WTA Elite Trophy.
Player received a wildcard.
Player withdrew from consideration of competing in this event.

Rank	Player	Grand Slam				WTA 1000							Best other					Total points	Tourn	Titles
Rank	Player	Grand Slam				Mandatory					Best two		Best other					Total points	Tourn	Titles
Rank	Player	AUS	FRA	WIM	USO	INW	MIA	MAD	ROM	BEI	1	2	1	2	3	4	5	Total points	Tourn	Titles
9	(Greece) Maria Sakkari	R32; 130	R128; 10	R128; 10	R128; 10	SF; 390	R64; 10	SF; 390	SF; 105	QF; 215	W 900	R16; 105	F 305	SF; 185	SF; 185	SF; 185	SF; 110	3,245	23	1
10	(Czech Republic) Barbora Krejčíková	R16; 240	R128; 10	R64; 70	R128; 10	R16; 120	R16; 120	R16; 120	R32; 65	R16; 55	W 900	A 0	W 470	F 305	F 180	R16; 55	R16; 55	2,775	19	2
11	(United States) Madison Keys	R32; 130	R64; 70	QF; 430	SF; 780	R64; 10	R32; 65	A 0	R16; 120	R32; 1	QF; 190	R32; 60	W 470	W 390	QF; 100	QF; 100	R64; 1	2,737	15	2
12	(Czech Republic) Petra Kvitová	R64; 70	R128; 10	R16; 240	R64; 70	QF; 215	W 1000	R64; 10	A 0	R32; 65	R16; 105	R16; 105	W 470	QF; 100	RR; 80	QF; 60	R32; 60	2,660	16	2
13	(Latvia) Jeļena Ostapenko	QF; 430	R64; 70	R64; 70	QF; 430	R32; 65	R16; 120	R32; 65	SF; 390	QF; 215	R16; 105	R16; 105	W 280	QF; 100	R32; 60	R16; 55	R16; 55	2,615	22	1
14	(Switzerland) Belinda Bencic	R16; 240	R128; 10	R16; 240	R16; 240	R64; 10	R32; 65	A 0	RR; 25	R16; 105	QF; 190	A 0	W 470	W 470	F 305	QF; 100	QF; 100	2,570	16	2
15	Liudmila Samsonova	R64; 70	R64; 70	R128; 10	R32; 130	R64; 10	R32; 65	R16; 120	R32; 65	F 650	F 585	R16; 105	F 305	SF; 185	QF; 60	QF; 60	R16; 55	2,545	22	0
16	Veronika Kudermetova	R64; 70	R128; 10	R64; 70	R128; 10	R32; 65	R64; 10	SF; 390	SF; 390	R16; 120	R16; 105	QF; 100	W 470	SF; 185	SF; 185	F 180	QF; 100	2,460	24	1
17	Daria Kasatkina	R128; 10	R16; 240	R32; 130	R16; 240	R32; 65	R64; 10	R16; 120	R16; 120	QF; 100	QF; 190	R16; 105	F 305	F 305	SF; 185	SF; 185	QF; 100	2,410	24	0
18	(China) Zheng Qinwen	R64; 70	R64; 70	R128; 10	QF; 430	A 0	R16; 120	R32; 65	QF; 215	R16; 55	R16; 105	R32; 60	W 470	W 280	SF; 185	R16; 80	R32; 60	2,275	21	2
19	(Brazil) Beatriz Haddad Maia	R128; 10	SF; 780	R16; 240	R64; 70	R32; 65	R32; 65	R64; 10	QF; 215	R16; 55	R32; 60	RR; 55	SF; 185	QF; 100	QF; 100	QF; 100	QF; 100	2,210	22	0
20	(France) Caroline Garcia	R16; 240	R64; 70	R32; 130	R128; 10	R16; 120	R64; 10	R32; 65	R32; 65	QF; 215	SF; 350	QF; 100	F 180	F 180	QF; 100	QF; 100	QF; 100	2,035	26	0
21	Ekaterina Alexandrova	R32; 130	R32; 130	R16; 240	R32; 130	R64; 10	QF; 215	R16; 120	R16; 55	R16; 55	R16; 105	A 0	W 280	SF; 185	F 180	QF; 100	QF; 100	2,035	24	1
22	Victoria Azarenka	SF; 780	R128; 10	R16; 240	R64; 70	R64; 10	R32; 65	R64; 10	R32; 65	R16; 30	QF; 190	R16; 105	QF; 100	R32; 60	R32; 60	R16; 55	R16; 55	1,905	21	0
23	(Croatia) Donna Vekić	QF; 430	R64; 70	R32; 130	R128; 10	R64; 10	R32; 65	R64; 10	R16; 120	R16; 55	R16; 105	R16; 30	F 305	W 280	H (Note: Host city final at the United Cup); 80	QF; 60	R16; 55	1,815	20	1
24	(Poland) Magda Linette	SF; 780	R128; 10	R32; 130	R64; 70	R64; 10	R16; 120	R32; 65	R32; 65	R16; 120	R64; 1	R16; 30	F 180	SF; 85	QF; 60	R16; 55	R16; 30	1,811	23	0
Alternates
25	(Ukraine) Elina Svitolina	A 0	QF; 430	SF; 780	R32; 130	A 0	A 0	R128; 10	R128; 10	A 0	R64; 1		W 280	QF; 100	R32; 1	R64; 1		1,743	10	1
26	(Romania) Sorana Cîrstea	R128; 10	R128; 10	R32; 130	QF; 430	QF; 215	SF; 390	R64; 35	R64; 35	R32; 25	R32; 60	R32; 60	R32; 60	R16; 55	R16; 55	R16; 30	R16; 30	1,630	22	0
27	Anastasia Potapova	R64; 70	R32; 130	R32; 130	R128; 10	R32; 65	QF; 215	R32; 65	R32; 65	R16; 30	R32; 60	R32; 13	W 280	SF; 185	SF; 110	QF; 100	QF; 60	1,588	21	1
Wildcard
36	(China) Zhu Lin	R16; 240	R128; 10	R128; 10	R32; 130	R128; 10	R64; 10	R128; 10	QF; 60	R64; 10	R64; 1	R64; 1	W 280	F 180	SF; 110	SF; 110	SF; 110	1,272	23	1

== See also ==
- 2023 WTA Finals
- 2023 ATP Finals
