= 2023 Aryna Sabalenka tennis season =

2023 tennis player season

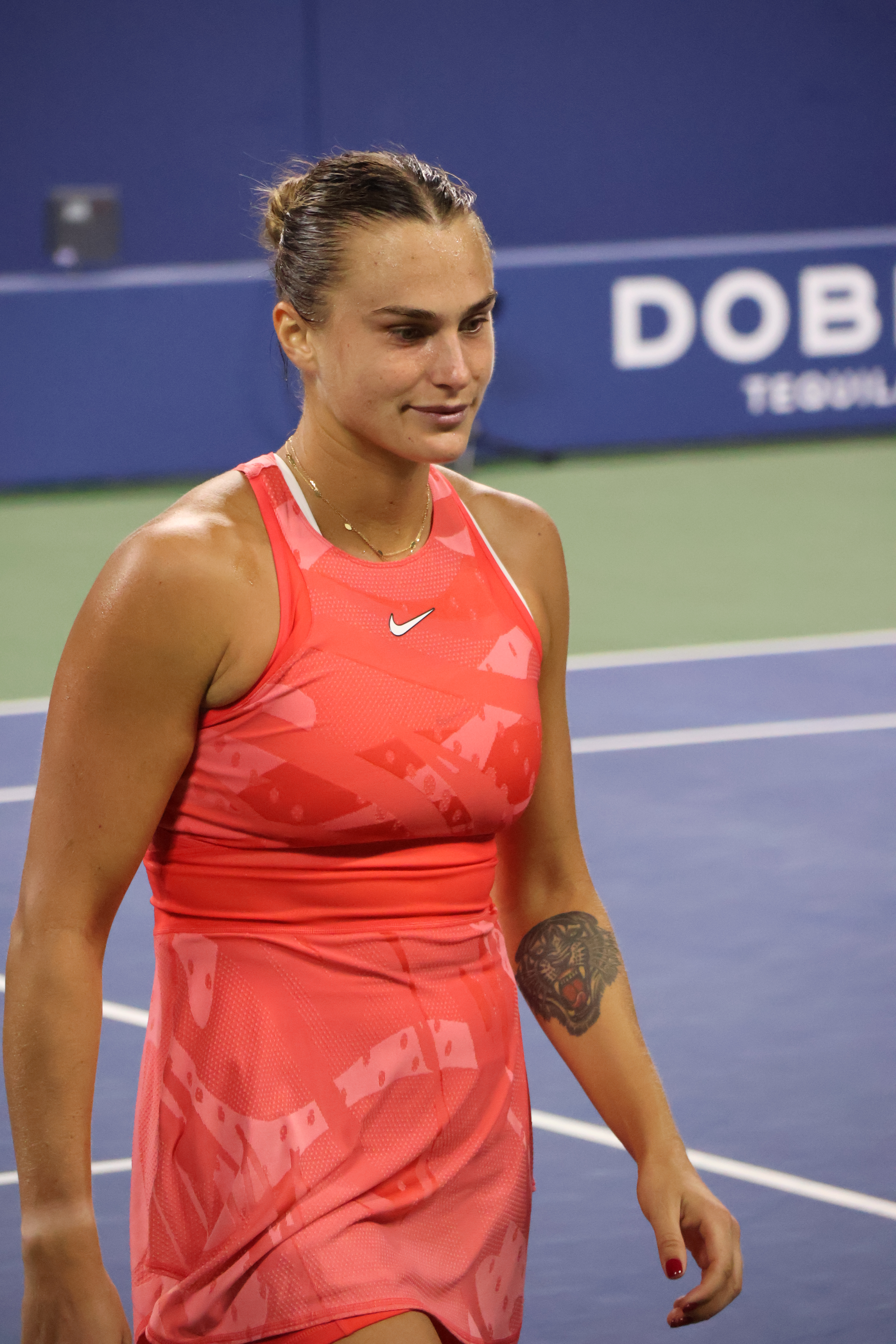
- Sabalenka at the 2023 US Open
- Full name: Aryna Siarhiejeŭna Sabalenka
- Country: Belarus (Note: Russian and Belarus players are not allowed to compete under the name or flag of their country following the Russian invasion of Ukraine.)
- Calendar prize money: $8,202,653

Singles
- Season record: 55–14
- Calendar titles: 3
- Current ranking: No. 2
- Ranking change from previous year: ▲4

Grand Slam & significant results
- Australian Open: W
- French Open: SF
- Wimbledon: SF
- US Open: F
- Championships: SF

Doubles
- Season record: 3–1
- Calendar titles: 0
- Last updated on: 11 September 2023.

The 2023 Aryna Sabalenka tennis season officially began on 4 January 2023 with the start of the Adelaide International.

During this season, Sabalenka:

- Won her first major title at the Australian Open.
- Clinched the singles No.1 ranking for the first time in her career.

== Yearly summary ==
=== Early hard court season ===
Sabalenka entered Adelaide 1 as the second seed. She reached her first final of the season by defeating Liudmila Samsonova, Markéta Vondroušová, Irina-Camelia Begu en route. Then, she defeated Czech teenage qualifier Linda Nosková to win her first title since Madrid 2021 and her 11th career title without dropping a set all week.

Sabalenka entered the Australian Open as the fifth seed. She defeated Tereza Martincová, Shelby Rogers, former doubles partner and 26th seed Elise Mertens, and the previous week's Adelaide 2 champion and world no. 10 Belinda Bencic to reach her first-ever Australian Open quarterfinal. She then beat Donna Vekić to reached her fourth Grand Slam semifinal, and won her tenth consecutive match by beating Magda Linette to make her first ever major final. In the final, she defeated reigning Wimbledon champion Elena Rybakina in three sets to win her first major title. She became the second Belarusian to ever win a major singles title, and the first since Victoria Azarenka, a decade ago. After winning the title in Melbourne, Sabalenka rose back to No. 2 in the WTA rankings.

In Dubai, Sabalenka defeated Lauren Davis and Jeļena Ostapenko to reach the quarterfinals, where she fell to the eventual champion Barbora Krejčíková in three sets. She then participated in Indian Wells, where she defeated Evgeniya Rodina and took revenge from Barbora Krejčíková for her last defeat in three sets. Then she beat Coco Gauff and Maria Sakkari to reach her first Indian Wells final, where she lost to Elena Rybakina in a rematch of the 2023 Australian Open final. In Miami, Sabalenka defeated Shelby Rogers, Marie Bouzková, and Barbora Krejčíková each in straight sets to reach the quarterfinals, where she was defeated by Sorana Cîrstea.

=== Early clay court season ===
Sabalenka started her clay court season in Stuttgart, where she defeated Barbora Krejčíková, Paula Badosa, and Anastasia Potapova to reach her fourth final of the year. In the final, which was a rematch of last year's final, she was defeated by world No. 1 Iga Świątek in straight sets for the second consecutive year. In Madrid, Sabalenka reached her second final at this tournament, defeating Sorana Cîrstea, Camila Osorio, Mirra Andreeva, Mayar Sherif, and Maria Sakkari, dropping just one set en route to the final. In the final, she would once again face Iga Świątek, and would win her third title of the year in three sets.

In Rome, Sabalenka would suffer her first early defeat of the year, losing in straight sets to former Grand Slam champion Sofia Kenin. At the French Open, she would reach the semifinals without dropping a set, defeating Marta Kostyuk, Iryna Shymanovich, Kamilla Rakhimova, Sloane Stephens, and Elina Svitolina. In the semifinals, she would face Karolína Muchová. Sabalenka lost this match in three sets, despite leading 5–2 and holding match point.

=== Grass court season ===
Sabalenka began her grass court season in Berlin, defeating Vera Zvonareva before losing to Veronika Kudermetova. Sabalenka next competed at Wimbledon, where she would reach her fourth straight major semifinal. Sabalenka defeated Panna Udvardy, Varvara Gracheva, Anna Blinkova, Ekaterina Alexandrova, and Madison Keys, before losing to Ons Jabeur, despite leading by a set and a break.

=== North American hard court season ===
Her next tournament would be Montréal, where she would defeat Petra Martić, before losing in three sets to eventual runner-up Liudmila Samsonova. She next reached the semifinals in Cincinnati, defeating Ann Li, Daria Kasatkina, and Ons Jabeur, before falling once again in three sets to Karolína Muchová.

At the US Open, Sabalenka would reach the semifinals by defeating Maryna Zanevska, Jodie Burrage, Clara Burel, Daria Kasatkina, and Zheng Qinwen in straight sets, dropping just 21 games in all five matches. Following these wins, Sabalenka became the first player since Serena Williams in 2016 to reach the semifinals of all four Grand Slam events in one year. She faced Madison Keys in the semifinals, recovering from a set and break deficit and serving to stay in the match four times in the final two sets. In her second major final of the year, Sabalenka faced Coco Gauff, and would lose in three sets. Due to the loss of world No. 1 Iga Świątek in the fourth round, Sabalenka became the world No. 1 tennis player at the conclusion of the tournament. Sabalenka became the 29th player to be ranked No. 1 in the world on the WTA Tour, and the second Belarusian, after Victoria Azarenka. She was also just the eighth female player to have been ranked No. 1 in the Open Era in both singles and doubles at some point in their careers. (Note: The other seven players to have been ranked No. 1 by the WTA in both singles and doubles in their career are Martina Navratilova, Arantxa Sánchez Vicario, Lindsay Davenport, Martina Hingis, Kim Clijsters, Venus Williams, and Serena Williams.) With Sabalenka reaching the final, she became the first woman since Serena Williams to reach the semifinals or better at all four majors in a season since 2016.

== All matches ==
Key
W	F	SF	QF	#R	RR	Q#	P#	DNQ	A	Z#	PO	G	S	B	NMS	NTI	P	NH

(W) winner; (F) finalist; (SF) semifinalist; (QF) quarterfinalist; (#R) rounds 4, 3, 2, 1; (RR) round-robin stage; (Q#) qualification round; (P#) preliminary round; (DNQ) did not qualify; (A) absent; (Z#) Davis/Fed Cup Zonal Group (with number indication) or (PO) play-off; (G) gold, (S) silver or (B) bronze Olympic/Paralympic medal; (NMS) not a Masters tournament; (NTI) not a Tier I tournament; (P) postponed; (NH) not held; (SR) strike rate (events won / competed); (W–L) win–loss record.
To avoid confusion and double counting, these charts are updated at the conclusion of a tournament or when the player's participation has ended.

=== Singles matches ===
Tournament	Match	Round	Opponent	Rank	Result	Score
Adelaide International 1; Adelaide, Australia; WTA 500; Hard, outdoor; 1 January 2023 – 8 January 2023	–	1R	Bye			
Adelaide International 1; Adelaide, Australia; WTA 500; Hard, outdoor; 1 January 2023 – 8 January 2023	1	2R	Liudmila Samsonova	20	Win	7–6^{(10–8)}, 7–6^{(7–3)}
Adelaide International 1; Adelaide, Australia; WTA 500; Hard, outdoor; 1 January 2023 – 8 January 2023	2	QF	(Czech Republic) Markéta Vondroušová (PR)	92	Win	6–3, 7–5
Adelaide International 1; Adelaide, Australia; WTA 500; Hard, outdoor; 1 January 2023 – 8 January 2023	3	SF	(Romania) Irina-Camelia Begu	34	Win	6–3, 6–2
Adelaide International 1; Adelaide, Australia; WTA 500; Hard, outdoor; 1 January 2023 – 8 January 2023	4	W	(Czech Republic) Linda Nosková (Q)	102	Win	6–3, 7–6^{(7–4)}
Australian Open; Melbourne, Australia; Grand Slam; Hard, outdoor; 16 January 2023 – 29 January 2023	5	1R	(Czech Republic) Tereza Martincová	74	Win	6–1, 6–4
Australian Open; Melbourne, Australia; Grand Slam; Hard, outdoor; 16 January 2023 – 29 January 2023	6	2R	(United States) Shelby Rogers	51	Win	6–3, 6–1
Australian Open; Melbourne, Australia; Grand Slam; Hard, outdoor; 16 January 2023 – 29 January 2023	7	3R	(Romania) Elise Mertens (26)	32	Win	6–2, 6–3
Australian Open; Melbourne, Australia; Grand Slam; Hard, outdoor; 16 January 2023 – 29 January 2023	8	4R	(Switzerland) Belinda Bencic (12)	10	Win	7–5, 6–2
Australian Open; Melbourne, Australia; Grand Slam; Hard, outdoor; 16 January 2023 – 29 January 2023	9	QF	(Croatia) Donna Vekić	64	Win	6–3, 6–2
Australian Open; Melbourne, Australia; Grand Slam; Hard, outdoor; 16 January 2023 – 29 January 2023	10	SF	(Poland) Magda Linette	45	Win	7–6^{(7–1)}, 6–2
Australian Open; Melbourne, Australia; Grand Slam; Hard, outdoor; 16 January 2023 – 29 January 2023	11	W	(Kazakhstan) Elena Rybakina (22)	25	Win (2)	3–6, 6–3, 6–4
Dubai Tennis Championships; Dubai, United Arab Emirates; WTA 1000; Hard, outdoor; 20 February 2023 – 26 February 2023	–	1R	Bye			
Dubai Tennis Championships; Dubai, United Arab Emirates; WTA 1000; Hard, outdoor; 20 February 2023 – 26 February 2023	12	2R	(United States) Lauren Davis (LL)	49	Win	6–0, 6–1
Dubai Tennis Championships; Dubai, United Arab Emirates; WTA 1000; Hard, outdoor; 20 February 2023 – 26 February 2023	13	3R	(Latvia) Jeļena Ostapenko (13)	20	Win	2–6, 6–1, 6–1
Dubai Tennis Championships; Dubai, United Arab Emirates; WTA 1000; Hard, outdoor; 20 February 2023 – 26 February 2023	14	QF	(Czech Republic) Barbora Krejčíková	30	Loss	6–0, 6–7^{(2–7)}, 1–6
Indian Wells Open; Indian Wells, United States; WTA 1000; Hard, outdoor; 6 March 2023 – 19 March 2023	–	1R	Bye			
Indian Wells Open; Indian Wells, United States; WTA 1000; Hard, outdoor; 6 March 2023 – 19 March 2023	15	2R	Evgeniya Rodina (PR)	427	Win	6–2, 6–0
Indian Wells Open; Indian Wells, United States; WTA 1000; Hard, outdoor; 6 March 2023 – 19 March 2023	–	3R	(Ukraine) Lesia Tsurenko (Q)	95	Walkover	—N/a
Indian Wells Open; Indian Wells, United States; WTA 1000; Hard, outdoor; 6 March 2023 – 19 March 2023	16	4R	(Czech Republic) Barbora Krejčíková (16)	16	Win	6–3, 2–6, 6–4
Indian Wells Open; Indian Wells, United States; WTA 1000; Hard, outdoor; 6 March 2023 – 19 March 2023	17	QF	(United States) Coco Gauff (6)	6	Win	6–4, 6–0
Indian Wells Open; Indian Wells, United States; WTA 1000; Hard, outdoor; 6 March 2023 – 19 March 2023	18	SF	(Greece) Maria Sakkari (7)	7	Win	6–2, 6–3
Indian Wells Open; Indian Wells, United States; WTA 1000; Hard, outdoor; 6 March 2023 – 19 March 2023	19	F	(Kazakhstan) Elena Rybakina (10)	10	Loss	6–7^{(11–13)}, 4–6
Miami Open; Miami Gardens, United States; WTA 1000; Hard, outdoor; 21 March 2023 – 2 April 2023	–	1R	Bye			
Miami Open; Miami Gardens, United States; WTA 1000; Hard, outdoor; 21 March 2023 – 2 April 2023	20	2R	(United States) Shelby Rogers	42	Win	6–4, 6–3
Miami Open; Miami Gardens, United States; WTA 1000; Hard, outdoor; 21 March 2023 – 2 April 2023	21	3R	(Czech Republic) Marie Bouzková (31)	36	Win	6–1, 6–2
Miami Open; Miami Gardens, United States; WTA 1000; Hard, outdoor; 21 March 2023 – 2 April 2023	22	4R	(Czech Republic) Barbora Krejčíková (16)	13	Win	6–3, 6–2
Miami Open; Miami Gardens, United States; WTA 1000; Hard, outdoor; 21 March 2023 – 2 April 2023	23	QF	(Romania) Sorana Cîrstea	74	Loss	4–6, 4–6
Stuttgart Open; Stuttgart, Germany; WTA 500; Clay, indoor; 17 April 2022 – 23 April 2022	–	1R	Bye			
Stuttgart Open; Stuttgart, Germany; WTA 500; Clay, indoor; 17 April 2022 – 23 April 2022	24	2R	(Czech Republic) Barbora Krejčíková	12	Win	6–2, 6–3
Stuttgart Open; Stuttgart, Germany; WTA 500; Clay, indoor; 17 April 2022 – 23 April 2022	25	QF	(Spain) Paula Badosa (WC)	31	Win	4–6, 6–4, 6–4
Stuttgart Open; Stuttgart, Germany; WTA 500; Clay, indoor; 17 April 2022 – 23 April 2022	26	SF	Anastasia Potapova	24	Win	6–1, 6–2
Stuttgart Open; Stuttgart, Germany; WTA 500; Clay, indoor; 17 April 2022 – 23 April 2022	27	F	(Poland) Iga Świątek (1)	1	Loss	3–6, 4–6
Madrid Open; Madrid, Spain; WTA 1000; Clay, outdoor; 25 April 2023 – 7 May 2023	–	1R	Bye			
Madrid Open; Madrid, Spain; WTA 1000; Clay, outdoor; 25 April 2023 – 7 May 2023	28	2R	(Romania) Sorana Cîrstea	44	Win	6–3, 6–4
Madrid Open; Madrid, Spain; WTA 1000; Clay, outdoor; 25 April 2023 – 7 May 2023	29	3R	(Colombia) Camila Osorio (WC)	115	Win	6–4, 7–5
Madrid Open; Madrid, Spain; WTA 1000; Clay, outdoor; 25 April 2023 – 7 May 2023	30	4R	Mirra Andreeva (WC)	194	Win	6–3, 6–1
Madrid Open; Madrid, Spain; WTA 1000; Clay, outdoor; 25 April 2023 – 7 May 2023	31	QF	(Egypt) Mayar Sherif	59	Win	2–6, 6–2, 6–1
Madrid Open; Madrid, Spain; WTA 1000; Clay, outdoor; 25 April 2023 – 7 May 2023	32	SF	(Greece) Maria Sakkari (9)	9	Win	6–4, 6–1
Madrid Open; Madrid, Spain; WTA 1000; Clay, outdoor; 25 April 2023 – 7 May 2023	33	W	(Poland) Iga Świątek (1)	1	Win (3)	6–3, 3–6, 6–3
Italian Open; Rome, Italy; WTA 1000; Clay, outdoor; 9 May 2023 – 21 May 2023	–	1R	Bye			
Italian Open; Rome, Italy; WTA 1000; Clay, outdoor; 9 May 2023 – 21 May 2023	34	2R	(United States) Sofia Kenin (PR)	134	Loss	6–7^{(4–7)}, 2–6
French Open; Paris, France; Grand Slam; Clay, outdoor; 28 May 2023 – 11 June 2023	35	1R	(Ukraine) Marta Kostyuk	39	Win	6–3, 6–2
French Open; Paris, France; Grand Slam; Clay, outdoor; 28 May 2023 – 11 June 2023	36	2R	Iryna Shymanovich (Q)	214	Win	7–5, 6–2
French Open; Paris, France; Grand Slam; Clay, outdoor; 28 May 2023 – 11 June 2023	37	3R	Kamilla Rakhimova	82	Win	6–2, 6–2
French Open; Paris, France; Grand Slam; Clay, outdoor; 28 May 2023 – 11 June 2023	38	4R	(United States) Sloane Stephens	30	Win	7–6^{(7–5)}, 6–4
French Open; Paris, France; Grand Slam; Clay, outdoor; 28 May 2023 – 11 June 2023	39	QF	(Ukraine) Elina Svitolina (PR)	192	Win	6–4, 6–4
French Open; Paris, France; Grand Slam; Clay, outdoor; 28 May 2023 – 11 June 2023	40	SF	(Czech Republic) Karolína Muchová	43	Loss	6–7^{(5–7)}, 7–6^{(9–7)}, 5–7
German Open; Berlin, Germany; WTA 500; Grass, outdoor; 19 June 2023 – 25 June 2023	41	1R	Vera Zvonareva (Q)	1243	Win	6–3, 6–2
German Open; Berlin, Germany; WTA 500; Grass, outdoor; 19 June 2023 – 25 June 2023	42	2R	Veronika Kudermetova (WC)	13	Loss	2–6, 6–7^{(2–7)}
Wimbledon; London, United Kingdom; Grand Slam; Grass, outdoor; 3 July 2023 – 16 July 2023	43	1R	(Hungary) Panna Udvardy	82	Win	6–1, 6–3
Wimbledon; London, United Kingdom; Grand Slam; Grass, outdoor; 3 July 2023 – 16 July 2023	44	2R	(France) Varvara Gracheva	41	Win	2–6, 7–5, 6–2
Wimbledon; London, United Kingdom; Grand Slam; Grass, outdoor; 3 July 2023 – 16 July 2023	45	3R	Anna Blinkova	40	Win	6–2, 6–3
Wimbledon; London, United Kingdom; Grand Slam; Grass, outdoor; 3 July 2023 – 16 July 2023	46	4R	Ekaterina Alexandrova (21)	22	Win	6–4, 6–0
Wimbledon; London, United Kingdom; Grand Slam; Grass, outdoor; 3 July 2023 – 16 July 2023	47	QF	(United States) Madison Keys (25)	18	Win	6–2, 6–4
Wimbledon; London, United Kingdom; Grand Slam; Grass, outdoor; 3 July 2023 – 16 July 2023	48	SF	(Tunisia) Ons Jabeur (6)	6	Loss	7–6^{(7–5)}, 4–6, 3–6
Canadian Open; Montréal, Canada; WTA 1000; Hard, outdoor; 7 August 2023 – 13 August 2023	–	1R	Bye			
Canadian Open; Montréal, Canada; WTA 1000; Hard, outdoor; 7 August 2023 – 13 August 2023	49	2R	(Croatia) Petra Martić	35	Win	6–3, 7–6^{(7–5)}
Canadian Open; Montréal, Canada; WTA 1000; Hard, outdoor; 7 August 2023 – 13 August 2023	50	3R	Liudmila Samsonova (15)	18	Loss	6–7^{(2–7)}, 6–4, 3–6
Cincinnati Open; Mason, United States; WTA 1000; Hard, outdoor; 13 August 2023 – 20 August 2023	–	1R	Bye			
Cincinnati Open; Mason, United States; WTA 1000; Hard, outdoor; 13 August 2023 – 20 August 2023	51	2R	(United States) Ann Li (Q)	192	Win	7–5, 2–6, 6–4
Cincinnati Open; Mason, United States; WTA 1000; Hard, outdoor; 13 August 2023 – 20 August 2023	52	3R	Daria Kasatkina (14)	13	Win	6–3, 6–3
Cincinnati Open; Mason, United States; WTA 1000; Hard, outdoor; 13 August 2023 – 20 August 2023	53	QF	(Tunisia) Ons Jabeur (5)	5	Win	7–5, 6–3
Cincinnati Open; Mason, United States; WTA 1000; Hard, outdoor; 13 August 2023 – 20 August 2023	54	SF	(Czech Republic) Karolína Muchová	17	Loss	7–6^{(7–4)}, 3–6, 2–6
US Open; New York City, United States; Grand Slam; Hard, outdoor; 28 August 2023 – 10 September 2023	55	1R	(Belgium) Maryna Zanevska	112	Win	6–3, 6–2
US Open; New York City, United States; Grand Slam; Hard, outdoor; 28 August 2023 – 10 September 2023	56	2R	(United Kingdom) Jodie Burrage	96	Win	6–3, 6–2
US Open; New York City, United States; Grand Slam; Hard, outdoor; 28 August 2023 – 10 September 2023	57	3R	(France) Clara Burel	62	Win	6–1, 6–1
US Open; New York City, United States; Grand Slam; Hard, outdoor; 28 August 2023 – 10 September 2023	58	4R	Daria Kasatkina (13)	14	Win	6–1, 6–3
US Open; New York City, United States; Grand Slam; Hard, outdoor; 28 August 2023 – 10 September 2023	59	QF	(China) Zheng Qinwen (23)	23	Win	6–1, 6–4
US Open; New York City, United States; Grand Slam; Hard, outdoor; 28 August 2023 – 10 September 2023	60	SF	(United States) Madison Keys (17)	17	Win	0–6, 7–6^{(7–1)}, 7–6^{(10–5)}
US Open; New York City, United States; Grand Slam; Hard, outdoor; 28 August 2023 – 10 September 2023	61	F	(United States) Coco Gauff (6)	6	Loss	6–2, 3–6, 2–6
China Open; Beijing, China; WTA 1000; Hard, outdoor; 2 October 2023 – 8 October 2023	62	1R	(United States) Sofia Kenin (WC)	31	Win	6–1, 6–2
China Open; Beijing, China; WTA 1000; Hard, outdoor; 2 October 2023 – 8 October 2023	63	2R	(United Kingdom) Katie Boulter (Q)	56	Win	7–5, 7–6^{(7–2)}
China Open; Beijing, China; WTA 1000; Hard, outdoor; 2 October 2023 – 8 October 2023	64	3R	(Italy) Jasmine Paolini	36	Win	6–4, 7–6^{(7–4)}
China Open; Beijing, China; WTA 1000; Hard, outdoor; 2 October 2023 – 8 October 2023	65	QF	(Kazakhstan) Elena Rybakina (5)	5	Loss	5–7, 2–6
WTA Finals; Cancún, Mexico; Year-end championships; Hard, outdoor; 29 October 2023 – 5 November 2023	66	RR	(Greece) Maria Sakkari (8)	9	Win	6–0, 6–1
WTA Finals; Cancún, Mexico; Year-end championships; Hard, outdoor; 29 October 2023 – 5 November 2023	67	RR	(United States) Jessica Pegula (5)	5	Loss	4–6, 3–6
WTA Finals; Cancún, Mexico; Year-end championships; Hard, outdoor; 29 October 2023 – 5 November 2023	68	RR	(Kazakhstan) Elena Rybakina (4)	4	Win	6–2, 3–6, 6–3
WTA Finals; Cancún, Mexico; Year-end championships; Hard, outdoor; 29 October 2023 – 5 November 2023	69	SF	(Poland) Iga Świątek (2)	2	Loss	3–6, 2–6

=== Doubles matches ===
Tournament	Match	Round	Opponent	Combined Rank	Result	Score
Adelaide International 1; Adelaide, Australia; WTA 500; Hard, outdoor; 1 January 2023 – 8 January 2023; Partner: Lidziya Marozava	1	1R	(Hungary) Anna Bondár / (Georgia (country)) Oksana Kalashnikova		Win	4–6, 6–4, [10–8]
Adelaide International 1; Adelaide, Australia; WTA 500; Hard, outdoor; 1 January 2023 – 8 January 2023; Partner: Lidziya Marozava	2	2R	(Chinese Taipei) Chan Hao-ching / (China) Yang Zhaoxuan (5)	52	Win	4–6, 6–1, [10–5]
Adelaide International 1; Adelaide, Australia; WTA 500; Hard, outdoor; 1 January 2023 – 8 January 2023; Partner: Lidziya Marozava	3	QF	(Spain) Cristina Bucșa / (Japan) Makoto Ninomiya		Win	6–2, 6–2
Adelaide International 1; Adelaide, Australia; WTA 500; Hard, outdoor; 1 January 2023 – 8 January 2023; Partner: Lidziya Marozava	4	SF	(Australia) Storm Hunter / (Czech Republic) Kateřina Siniaková (1)	11	Loss	4–6, 6–1, [3–10]

== Tournament schedule ==
=== Singles schedule ===
Date	Tournament	Location	Category	Surface	Previous result	Previous points	New points	Outcome
1 January 2023 – 8 January 2023	Adelaide International 1	Australia	WTA 500	Hard	First round	10	500	Winner, defeated (Czech Republic) Linda Nosková; 6–3, 7–6^{(7–4)}
16 January 2023 – 29 January 2023	Australian Open	Australia	Grand Slam	Hard	Fourth round	240	2000	Winner, defeated (Kazakhstan) Elena Rybakina; 3–6, 6–3, 6–4
20 February 2023 – 26 February 2023	Dubai Tennis Championships	United Arab Emirates	WTA 1000	Hard	Second round	55	105	Quarterfinals lost to (Czech Republic) Barbora Krejčíková; 6–0, 6–7^{(2–7)}, 1–6
6 March 2023 – 19 March 2023	Indian Wells Open	United States	WTA 1000	Hard	Second round	10	650	Final lost to (Kazakhstan) Elena Rybakina; 6–7^{(11–13)}, 4–6
21 March 2023 – 2 April 2023	Miami Open	United States	WTA 1000	Hard	Second round	10	215	Quarterfinals lost to (Romania) Sorana Cîrstea; 4–6, 4–6
17 April 2023 – 23 April 2023	Stuttgart Open	Germany	WTA 500	Clay (i)	Final	305	305	Final lost to (Poland) Iga Świątek; 3–6, 4–6
24 April 2023 – 7 May 2023	Madrid Open	Spain	WTA 1000	Clay	Second round	10	1000	Winner, defeated (Poland) Iga Świątek; 6–3, 3–6, 6–3
9 May 2023 – 21 May 2023	Italian Open	Italy	WTA 1000	Clay	Semifinals	350	10	Second round lost to (United States) Sofia Kenin; 6–7^{(4–7)}, 2–6
28 May 2023 – 11 June 2023	French Open	France	Grand Slam	Clay	Third round	130	780	Semifinals lost to (Czech Republic) Karolína Muchová; 6–7^{(5–7)}, 7–6^{(7–5)}, 5–7
19 June 2023 – 25 June 2023	German Open	Germany	WTA 500	Grass	First round	1	55	Second round lost to Veronika Kudermetova; 2–6, 6–7^{(2–7)}
3 July 2022 – 16 July 2022	Wimbledon	United Kingdom	Grand Slam	Grass	Could not participate (Note: Russian and Belarusian players were banned from participating in the 2022 Wimbledon Championships due to the Russian invasion of Ukraine.)	—N/a (Note: Following the All England Lawn Tennis and Croquet Club's decision to ban Russian and Belarusian players from the 2022 Wimbledon Championships due to the Russian invasion of Ukraine, the ITF, ATP, and WTA stripped the event of ranking points.)	780	Semifinals lost to (Tunisia) Ons Jabeur; 7–6^{(7–5)}, 4–6, 3–6
7 August 2023 – 13 August 2023	Canadian Open	Canada	WTA 1000	Hard	Third round	105	105	Third round lost to Liudmila Samsonova; 6–7^{(2–7)}, 6–4, 3–6
13 August 2023 – 20 August 2023	Cincinnati Open	United States	WTA 1000	Hard	Semifinals	350	350	Semifinals lost to (Czech Republic) Karolína Muchová; 7–6(7–4), 3–6, 2–6
28 August 2023 – 4 September 2023	US Open	United States	Grand Slam	Hard	Semifinals	780	1300	Final lost to (United States) Coco Gauff; 6–2, 3–6, 2–6
30 September 2023 – 8 October 2023	China Open	China	WTA 1000	Hard	Not held	0	215	Quarterfinals lost to (Kazakhstan) Elena Rybakina; 5–7, 2–6
29 October 2023 – 5 November 2023	WTA Finals	Mexico	WTA Finals	Hard	Final	955	625	Semifinals lost to (Poland) Iga Świątek; 3–6, 2–6
Total year-end points							9,050	

=== Doubles schedule ===
Date	Tournament	Location	Category	Surface	Previous result	Outcome
1 January 2023– 8 January 2023	Adelaide International 1	Australia	WTA 500	Hard	Did not participate	Semifinals lost to (Australia) Storm Hunter / (Czech Republic) Kateřina Siniaková; 4–6, 6–1, [3–10]

== Yearly records ==
=== Head-to-head match-ups ===
Sabalenka has a 55–14 WTA match win–loss record in the 2023 season. Her record against players who were part of the WTA rankings top ten at the time of their meetings is 8–7. Bold indicates player was ranked top 10 at the time of at least one meeting. The following list is ordered by number of wins:

- (Greece) **Maria Sakkari** 3–0
- Daria Kasatkina 2–0
- (United States) Madison Keys 2–0
- (United States) Shelby Rogers 2–0
- (Czech Republic) Barbora Krejčíková 2–1
- (Kazakhstan) **Elena Rybakina** 2–2
- (Switzerland) **Belinda Bencic** 1–0
- Ekaterina Alexandrova 1–0
- Anna Blinkova 1–0
- Vera Zvonareva 1–0
- Kamilla Rakhimova 1–0
- Iryna Shymanovich 1–0
- Mirra Andreeva 1–0
- Anastasia Potapova 1–0
- Evgeniya Rodina 1–0
- (Czech Republic) Markéta Vondroušová 1–0
- (Romania) Irina-Camelia Begu 1–0
- (Czech Republic) Marie Bouzková 1–0
- (Czech Republic) Linda Nosková 1–0
- (Czech Republic) Tereza Martincová 1–0
- (Romania) Elise Mertens 1–0
- (Croatia) Donna Vekić 1–0
- (Poland) Magda Linette 1–0
- (United States) Lauren Davis 1–0
- (Latvia) Jeļena Ostapenko 1–0
- (Spain) Paula Badosa 1–0
- (Colombia) Camila Osorio 1–0
- (Egypt) Mayar Sherif 1–0
- (Ukraine) Marta Kostyuk 1–0
- (United States) Sloane Stephens 1–0
- (Ukraine) Elina Svitolina 1–0
- (Hungary) Panna Udvardy 1–0
- (France) Varvara Gracheva 1–0
- (Croatia) Petra Martić 1–0
- (United States) Ann Li 1–0
- (Belgium) Maryna Zanevska 1–0
- (United Kingdom) Jodie Burrage 1–0
- (France) Clara Burel 1–0
- (China) Zheng Qinwen 1–0
- (United Kingdom) Katie Boulter 1–0
- (Italy) Jasmine Paolini 1–0
- (Poland) **Iga Świątek** 1–2
- (United States) **Coco Gauff** 1–1
- (Tunisia) **Ons Jabeur** 1–1
- Liudmila Samsonova 1–1
- (Romania) Sorana Cîrstea 1–1
- (United States) Sofia Kenin 1–1
- Veronika Kudermetova 0–1
- (United States) **Jessica Pegula** 0–1
- (Czech Republic) Karolína Muchová 0–2

=== Top 10 record ===
Result	W–L	Opponent	Rank	Tournament	Surface	Rd	Score	ASR
Win	1–0	(Switzerland) Belinda Bencic	No. 10	Australian Open, Australia	Hard	4R	7–5, 6–2	No. 5
Win	2–0	(United States) Coco Gauff	No. 6	Indian Wells Open, United States	Hard	QF	6–4, 6–0	No. 2
Win	3–0	(Greece) Maria Sakkari	No. 7	Indian Wells Open, United States	Hard	SF	6–2, 6–3	No. 2
Loss	3–1	(Kazakhstan) Elena Rybakina	No. 10	Indian Wells Open, United States	Hard	F	6–7^{(11–13)}, 4–6	No. 2
Loss	3–2	(Poland) Iga Świątek	No. 1	Stuttgart Open, Germany	Clay (i)	F	3–6, 4–6	No. 2
Win	4–2	(Greece) Maria Sakkari	No. 9	Madrid Open, Spain	Clay	SF	6–4, 6–1	No. 2
Win	5–2	(Poland) Iga Świątek	No. 1	Madrid Open, Spain	Clay	F	6–3, 3–6, 6–3	No. 2
Loss	5–3	(Tunisia) Ons Jabeur	No. 6	Wimbledon, United Kingdom	Grass	SF	7–6^{(7–5)}, 4–6, 3–6	No. 2
Win	6–3	(Tunisia) Ons Jabeur	No. 5	Cincinnati Open, United States	Hard	QF	7–5, 6–3	No. 2
Loss	6–4	(United States) Coco Gauff	No. 6	US Open, United States	Hard	F	6–2, 3–6, 2–6	No. 2
Loss	6–5	(Kazakhstan) Elena Rybakina	No. 5	China Open, China	Hard	QF	5–7, 2–6	No. 1
Win	7–5	(Greece) Maria Sakkari	No. 9	WTA Finals, Mexico	Hard	RR	6–0, 6–1	No. 1
Loss	7–6	(United States) Jessica Pegula	No. 5	WTA Finals, Mexico	Hard	RR	4–6, 3–6	No. 1
Win	8–6	(Kazakhstan) Elena Rybakina	No. 4	WTA Finals, Mexico	Hard	RR	6–2, 3–6, 6–3	No. 1
Loss	8–7	(Poland) Iga Świątek	No. 2	WTA Finals, Mexico	Hard	SF	3–6, 2–6	No. 1

=== Finals ===
==== Singles: 6 (3 titles, 3 runner-ups) ====
Legend Grand Slam tournaments (1–1) WTA Tour Championships (0–0) WTA Elite Trophy (0–0) WTA 1000 (1–1) WTA 500 (1–1) WTA 250 (0–0)	Finals by surface Hard (2–2) Clay (1–1) Grass (0–0)	Finals by setting Outdoor (3–2) Indoor (0–1)

Result	W–L	Date	Tournament	Tier	Surface	Opponent	Score
Win	1–0	Jan 2023	Adelaide International, Australia	WTA 500	Hard	(Czech Republic) Linda Nosková	6–3, 7–6^{(7–4)}
Win	2–0	Jan 2023	Australian Open, Australia	Grand Slam	Hard	(Kazakhstan) Elena Rybakina	4–6, 6–3, 6–4
Loss	2–1	Mar 2023	Indian Wells Open, United States	WTA 1000	Hard	(Kazakhstan) Elena Rybakina	6–7^{(11–13)}, 4–6
Loss	2–2	Apr 2023	Stuttgart Open, Germany	WTA 500	Clay (i)	(Poland) Iga Świątek	3–6, 4–6
Win	3–2	May 2023	Madrid Open, Spain	WTA 1000	Clay	(Poland) Iga Świątek	6–3, 3–6, 6–3
Loss	3–3	Sep 2023	US Open, United States	Grand Slam	Hard	(United States) Coco Gauff	6–2, 3–6, 2–6

=== Earnings ===
- **Bold** font denotes tournament win

#	Tournament	Singles Prize money	Doubles Prize money	Year-to-date
1.	**Adelaide International 1**	**$120,150**	$6,950	$127,100
2.	**Australian Open**	**A$2,975,000**	$0	$2,202,162
3.	Dubai Tennis Championships	$63,350	$0	$2,265,512
4.	Indian Wells Open	$662,360	$0	$2,927,872
5.	Miami Open	$184,465	$0	$3,112,337
6.	Stuttgart Open	€64,500	$0	$3,181,600
7.	**Madrid Open**	**€1,105,265**	$0	$4,368,360
8.	Italian Open	€12,652	$0	$4,381,945
9.	French Open	€630,000	$0	$5,058,398
10.	German Open	€9,156	$0	$5,068,230
11.	Wimbledon Championships	£600,000	$0	$5,817,363
12.	Canadian Open	$31,650	$0	$5,849,013
13.	Cincinnati Open	$138,000	$0	$5,987,013
14.	US Open	$1,500,000	$0	$7,487,013
**Total prize money**		**$7,480,063**	**$6,950**	**$7,487,013**

Figures in United States dollars (USD) unless noted.

== See also ==
- 2023 Iga Świątek tennis season
- 2023 Elena Rybakina tennis season
