= 2023 Porsche Tennis Grand Prix – Doubles =

Doubles
- 2023 Porsche Tennis Grand Prix

Final
- Champions: (United States) Desirae Krawczyk (Netherlands) Demi Schuurs
- Runners-up: (United States) Nicole Melichar-Martinez (Mexico) Giuliana Olmos
- Score: 6–4, 6–1

Details
- Draw: 16
- Seeds: 4

Events
Singles	Doubles
- Porsche Tennis Grand Prix

Defending champions Desirae Krawczyk and Demi Schuurs defeated Nicole Melichar-Martinez and Giuliana Olmos in the final, 6–4, 6–1 to win the doubles tennis title at the 2023 Stuttgart Open.

== Seeds ==
1. (Ukraine) Lyudmyla Kichenok / (Latvia) Jeļena Ostapenko (first round)
2. (United States) Desirae Krawczyk / (Netherlands) Demi Schuurs (champions)
3. (United States) Nicole Melichar-Martinez / (Mexico) Giuliana Olmos (final)
4. (Canada) Gabriela Dabrowski / (Brazil) Luisa Stefani (quarterfinals)

== Draw ==
Key

- Q = Qualifier
- WC = Wild card
- LL = Lucky loser
- Alt = Alternate
- ITF = ITF entry
- PR = Protected ranking
- SR = Special ranking
- SE = Special exempt
- JE = Junior exempt
- JR = Junior Accelerator Programme entrant
- CO = College Accelerator Programme entrant
- NG = Next Gen Accelerator Program entrant
- w/o = Walkover
- r = Retired
- d = Defaulted

=== Draw ===
First Round
1	(Ukraine) L Kichenok (Latvia) J Ostapenko	6	4	[6]
V Kudermetova; A Potapova	3	6	[10]
(Spain) C Bucșa (Georgia (country)) O Kalashnikova	6	5	[5]
(Japan) M Kato (Indonesia) A Sutjiadi	2	7	[10]
3	(United States) N Melichar-Martinez (Mexico) G Olmos	6	3	[12]
Alt	(Germany) V Heisen (Estonia) I Neel	3	6	[10]
(Czech Republic) M Kolodziejová (Poland) A Rosolska	3	6	[10]
(China) Y Xu (China) Z Yang	6	2	[4]
(Chile) A Guarachi (New Zealand) E Routliffe	6	1	[10]
(Romania) M Niculescu (Japan) M Ninomiya	4	6	[7]
WC	(Germany) M Barthel (Germany) A-L Friedsam	3	4
4	(Canada) G Dabrowski (Brazil) L Stefani	6	6
A Panova; Y Sizikova	3	6	[8]
(Slovakia) T Mihalíková (United States) A Parks	6	3	[10]
(Ukraine) N Kichenok (Belgium) K Zimmermann	3	6	[9]
2	(United States) D Krawczyk (Netherlands) D Schuurs	6	4	[11]

Quarterfinals
V Kudermetova; A Potapova	6	6
(Japan) M Kato (Indonesia) A Sutjiadi	3	4
3	(United States) N Melichar-Martinez (Mexico) G Olmos	7^{8}	6
(Czech Republic) M Kolodziejová (Poland) A Rosolska	6^{6}	3
(Chile) A Guarachi (New Zealand) E Routliffe	7	7^{7}
4	(Canada) G Dabrowski (Brazil) L Stefani	5	6^{4}
(Slovakia) T Mihalíková (United States) A Parks	4	6^{4}
2	(United States) D Krawczyk (Netherlands) D Schuurs	6	7^{7}

Semifinals
V Kudermetova; A Potapova	4	6^{2}
3	(United States) N Melichar-Martinez (Mexico) G Olmos	6	7^{7}
(Chile) A Guarachi (New Zealand) E Routliffe	1	5
2	(United States) D Krawczyk (Netherlands) D Schuurs	6	7

Final
3	(United States) N Melichar-Martinez (Mexico) G Olmos	4	1
2	(United States) D Krawczyk (Netherlands) D Schuurs	6	6
