= 2023 Abu Dhabi Open – Doubles =

Doubles
- 2023 Abu Dhabi Open

Final
- Champions: (Brazil) Luisa Stefani (China) Zhang Shuai
- Runners-up: (Japan) Shuko Aoyama (Chinese Taipei) Chan Hao-ching
- Score: 3–6, 6–2, [10–8]

Events
Singles	Doubles
← 2021 ·	Abu Dhabi Open	· 2024 →

Luisa Stefani and Zhang Shuai defeated the defending champion Shuko Aoyama and her partner Chan Hao-ching in the final, 3–6, 6–2, [10–8] to win the doubles tennis title at the 2023 Abu Dhabi Open.

Aoyama and Ena Shibahara were the reigning champions from 2021, when the event was last held, but Shibahara chose not to compete this year.

== Seeds ==
1. (United States) Desirae Krawczyk / (Mexico) Giuliana Olmos (semifinals)
2. (Kazakhstan) Anna Danilina / (Ukraine) Lyudmyla Kichenok (first round)
3. (United States) Nicole Melichar-Martinez / (Australia) Ellen Perez (first round)
4. (China) Yang Zhaoxuan / Vera Zvonareva (quarterfinals)

== Draw ==
=== Key ===
- Q = Qualifier
- WC = Wild card
- LL = Lucky loser
- Alt = Alternate
- SE = Special exempt
- PR = Protected ranking
- ITF = ITF entry
- JE = Junior exempt
- w/o = Walkover
- r = Retired
- d = Defaulted
- SR = Special ranking

=== Draw ===
First round
1	(United States) D Krawczyk (Mexico) G Olmos	6	6
(Slovakia) T Mihalíková (China) Y Xu	2	1
(Hungary) T Babos (France) K Mladenovic	6	6
V Kudermetova; L Samsonova	3	4
3	(United States) N Melichar-Martinez (Australia) E Perez	6^{4}	5
(Japan) S Aoyama (Chinese Taipei) H-c Chan	7^{7}	7
(Switzerland) B Bencic (Belgium) E Mertens	6	6
(Poland) A Rosolska (New Zealand) E Routliffe	1	1
(Japan) M Kato (Romania) M Niculescu	6	6
(Norway) U Eikeri (Chile) A Guarachi	2	4
(Canada) L Fernandez; A Sasnovich	4	4
4	(China) Z Yang; V Zvonareva	6	6
WC	(United States) B Mattek-Sands (India) S Mirza	3	4
(Belgium) K Flipkens (Germany) L Siegemund	6	6
(Brazil) L Stefani (China) S Zhang	6^{4}	6	[10]
2	(Kazakhstan) A Danilina (Ukraine) L Kichenok	7^{7}	3	[5]

Quarterfinals
1	(United States) D Krawczyk (Mexico) G Olmos	6	7^{7}
(Hungary) T Babos (France) K Mladenovic	3	6^{3}
(Japan) S Aoyama (Chinese Taipei) H-c Chan	w/o
(Switzerland) B Bencic (Belgium) E Mertens
(Japan) M Kato (Romania) M Niculescu	6	6
4	(China) Z Yang; V Zvonareva	1	3
(Belgium) K Flipkens (Germany) L Siegemund	4	4
(Brazil) L Stefani (China) S Zhang	6	6

Semifinals
1	(United States) D Krawczyk (Mexico) G Olmos	4	6	[3]
(Japan) S Aoyama (Chinese Taipei) H-c Chan	6	2	[10]
(Japan) M Kato (Romania) M Niculescu	5	3
(Brazil) L Stefani (China) S Zhang	7	6

Final
(Japan) S Aoyama (Chinese Taipei) H-c Chan	6	2	[8]
(Brazil) L Stefani (China) S Zhang	3	6	[10]
