= 2023 WTA German Open – Doubles =

Doubles
- 2023 WTA German Open

Final
- Champions: (France) Caroline Garcia (Brazil) Luisa Stefani
- Runners-up: (Czech Republic) Kateřina Siniaková (Czech Republic) Markéta Vondroušová
- Score: 4–6, 7–6^{(10–8)}, [10–4]

Events
Singles	Doubles
← 2022 ·	WTA German Open	· 2024 →

Caroline Garcia and Luisa Stefani defeated the defending champion Kateřina Siniaková and her partner Markéta Vondroušová in the final, 4–6, 7–6^{(10–8)}, [10–4] to win the doubles tennis title at the 2023 WTA German Open. They saved three championship points en route to their first title together as a team.

Storm Hunter and Siniaková were the reigning champions, but Hunter chose to compete in Birmingham instead.

== Seeds ==
1. (United States) Nicole Melichar-Martinez / (Australia) Ellen Perez (semifinals)
2. (United States) Desirae Krawczyk / (Netherlands) Demi Schuurs (semifinals)
3. (Japan) Shuko Aoyama / (Japan) Ena Shibahara (first round)
4. (Kazakhstan) Anna Danilina / (China) Xu Yifan (quarterfinals)

== Draw ==
=== Key ===
- Q = Qualifier
- WC = Wild card
- LL = Lucky loser
- Alt = Alternate
- SE = Special exempt
- PR = Protected ranking
- ITF = ITF entry
- JE = Junior exempt
- w/o = Walkover
- r = Retired
- d = Defaulted
- SR = Special ranking

=== Draw ===
First round
1	(United States) N Melichar-Martinez (Australia) E Perez	3	6	[10]
(United States) A Muhammad (Mexico) G Olmos	6	3	[8]
(Chile) A Guarachi (New Zealand) E Routliffe	7	3	[9]
WC	(Germany) J Niemeier (Germany) N Noha Akugue	5	6	[11]
3	(Japan) S Aoyama (Japan) E Shibahara	4	5
Y Sizikova (Belgium) K Zimmermann	6	7
(France) C Garcia (Brazil) L Stefani	7	6
E Alexandrova (China) Z Yang	5	2
(Croatia) P Martić (Greece) M Sakkari	2	6	[8]
(Czech Republic) K Siniaková (Czech Republic) M Vondroušová	6	2	[10]
(Germany) L Siegemund; V Zvonareva	3	1
4	(Kazakhstan) A Danilina (China) Y Xu	6	6
(Japan) M Kato (Indonesia) A Sutjiadi	4	6	[8]
WC	D Kasatkina (Germany) S Lisicki	6	4	[10]
(Chinese Taipei) H-c Chan (Chinese Taipei) L Chan	5	4
2	(United States) D Krawczyk (Netherlands) D Schuurs	7	6

Quarterfinals
1	(United States) N Melichar-Martinez (Australia) E Perez	w/o
WC	(Germany) J Niemeier (Germany) N Noha Akugue
Y Sizikova (Belgium) K Zimmermann	2	2
(France) C Garcia (Brazil) L Stefani	6	6
(Czech Republic) K Siniaková (Czech Republic) M Vondroušová	3	7	[10]
4	(Kazakhstan) A Danilina (China) Y Xu	6	5	[7]
WC	D Kasatkina (Germany) S Lisicki	3	4
2	(United States) D Krawczyk (Netherlands) D Schuurs	6	6

Semifinals
1	(United States) N Melichar-Martinez (Australia) E Perez	4	4
(France) C Garcia (Brazil) L Stefani	6	6
(Czech Republic) K Siniaková (Czech Republic) M Vondroušová	6	6
2	(United States) D Krawczyk (Netherlands) D Schuurs	4	4

Final
(France) C Garcia (Brazil) L Stefani	4	7^{10}	[10]
(Czech Republic) K Siniaková (Czech Republic) M Vondroušová	6	6^{8}	[4]
