= 2023 Abu Dhabi Open – Singles =

Singles
- 2023 Abu Dhabi Open

Final
- Champion: (Switzerland) Belinda Bencic
- Runner-up: Liudmila Samsonova
- Score: 1–6, 7–6^{(10–8)}, 6–4

Details
- Draw: 28
- Seeds: 8

Events
Singles	Doubles
← 2021 ·	Abu Dhabi Open	· 2024 →

Belinda Bencic defeated Liudmila Samsonova in the final, 1–6, 7–6^{(10–8)}, 6–4 to win the singles tennis title at the 2023 Abu Dhabi Open. It was her eighth career WTA Tour-level singles title. She saved three championship points en route to the title.

Aryna Sabalenka was the reigning champion, when the tournament was last held in 2021, but chose not to compete this year.

== Seeds ==
The top four seeds received a bye into the second round.

1. Daria Kasatkina (quarterfinals)
2. (Switzerland) Belinda Bencic (champion)
3. (Kazakhstan) Elena Rybakina (quarterfinals)
4. Veronika Kudermetova (quarterfinals)
5. (Latvia) Jeļena Ostapenko (second round)
6. (Brazil) Beatriz Haddad Maia (semifinals)
7. (Estonia) Anett Kontaveit (second round, retired)
8. Liudmila Samsonova (final)

== Draw ==
=== Finals ===
Semifinals
(China) Zheng Qinwen	4	6	4
8	Liudmila Samsonova	6	1	6
6	(Brazil) Beatriz Haddad Maia	2	3
2	(Switzerland) Belinda Bencic	6	6

Final
8	Liudmila Samsonova	6	6^{8}	4
2	(Switzerland) Belinda Bencic	1	7^{10}	6

=== Top half ===
First round
(Switzerland) J Teichmann	6	7^{7}
Q	(Ukraine) D Yastremska	3	6^{5}
Q	(Canada) R Marino	3	3
(China) Q Zheng	6	6
(United States) D Collins	5	6	5
5	(Latvia) J Ostapenko	7	1	7
(Belgium) E Mertens	6	6
(Italy) M Trevisan	0	2
(Czech Republic) B Krejčíková	6	6
Q	(Romania) E-G Ruse	1	4
LL	(United States) C Liu	6	2	0
8	L Samsonova	3	6	6

Second round
1	D Kasatkina	1	6	6
(Switzerland) J Teichmann	6	0	2
(China) Q Zheng	7^{12}	6
5	(Latvia) J Ostapenko	6^{10}	1
4	V Kudermetova	6	7
(Belgium) E Mertens	1	5
(Czech Republic) B Krejčíková	5	6^{6}
8	L Samsonova	7	7^{8}

Quarterfinals
1	D Kasatkina	1	2
(China) Q Zheng	6	6
4	V Kudermetova	3	3
8	L Samsonova	6	6

Semifinals
(China) Q Zheng	4	6	4
8	L Samsonova	6	1	6

=== Bottom half ===
First round
6	(Brazil) B Haddad Maia	4	6	6
(Czech Republic) M Bouzková	6	3	0
PR	(Canada) B Andreescu	6^{2}	2
Q	(Kazakhstan) Y Putintseva	7^{7}	6
(Czech Republic) Ka Plíšková	6	6
LL	(Belgium) Y Bonaventure	1	3
7	(Estonia) A Kontaveit	4	7^{7}	6
(China) S Zhang	6	6^{4}	4
Q	(United States) S Rogers	6	6^{5}	6
Q	(Canada) L Fernandez	4	7^{7}	1
WC	(Ukraine) M Kostyuk	6	1	6
WC	(Romania) S Cîrstea	2	6	2

Second round
6	(Brazil) B Haddad Maia	6	6^{5}	7^{7}
Q	(Kazakhstan) Y Putintseva	4	7^{7}	6^{4}
(Czech Republic) Ka Plíšková	4	2
3	(Kazakhstan) E Rybakina	6	6
7	(Estonia) A Kontaveit	6	3	1^{r}
Q	(United States) S Rogers	4	6	4
WC	(Ukraine) M Kostyuk	4	5
2	(Switzerland) B Bencic	6	7

Quarterfinals
6	(Brazil) B Haddad Maia	3	6	6
3	(Kazakhstan) E Rybakina	6	3	2
Q	(United States) S Rogers	6^{5}	2
2	(Switzerland) B Bencic	7^{7}	6

Semifinals
6	(Brazil) B Haddad Maia	2	3
2	(Switzerland) B Bencic	6	6

== Qualifying ==
=== Seeds ===
1. Aliaksandra Sasnovich (first round)
2. (Canada) Leylah Fernandez (qualified)
3. (Kazakhstan) Yulia Putintseva (qualified)
4. (United States) Shelby Rogers (qualified)
5. (United States) Claire Liu (qualifying competition, lucky loser)
6. (Canada) Rebecca Marino (qualified)
7. (Czech Republic) Tereza Martincová (first round, retired)
8. (Belgium) Ysaline Bonaventure (qualifying competition, lucky loser)
9. (Poland) Magdalena Fręch (qualifying competition)
10. (Ukraine) Dayana Yastremska (qualified)
11. (France) Diane Parry (first round)
12. (Japan) Moyuka Uchijima (first round)

=== Qualifiers ===
1. (Romania) Elena-Gabriela Ruse
2. (Canada) Leylah Fernandez
3. (Kazakhstan) Yulia Putintseva
4. (United States) Shelby Rogers
5. (Ukraine) Dayana Yastremska
6. (Canada) Rebecca Marino

=== Lucky losers ===
1. (United States) Claire Liu
2. (Belgium) Ysaline Bonaventure

=== Qualifying draw ===
==== First qualifier ====
First round
1	Aliaksandra Sasnovich	3	7^{9}	5
(Sweden) Mirjam Björklund	6	6^{7}	7
(Romania) Elena-Gabriela Ruse	6	3
7	(Czech Republic) Tereza Martincová	3	0^{r}

Qualifying competition
(Sweden) Mirjam Björklund	4	1
(Romania) Elena-Gabriela Ruse	6	6

==== Second qualifier ====
First round
2	(Canada) Leylah Fernandez	6	6
(France) Kristina Mladenovic	1	2
PR	(Ukraine) Katarina Zavatska	1	6	6
12	(Japan) Moyuka Uchijima	6	3	2

Qualifying competition
2	(Canada) Leylah Fernandez	6	6
PR	(Ukraine) Katarina Zavatska	1	4

==== Third qualifier ====
First round
3	(Kazakhstan) Yulia Putintseva	6	7
WC	Anastasia Zakharova	2	5
(Uzbekistan) Nigina Abduraimova	6	6
11	(France) Diane Parry	3	3

Qualifying competition
3	(Kazakhstan) Yulia Putintseva	6	6
(Uzbekistan) Nigina Abduraimova	2	2

==== Fourth qualifier ====
First round
4	(United States) Shelby Rogers	6	6
WC	Vera Zvonareva	2	3
(South Korea) Jang Su-jeong	6	5	2
9	(Poland) Magdalena Fręch	4	7	6

Qualifying competition
4	(United States) Shelby Rogers	1	6	6
9	(Poland) Magdalena Fręch	6	3	4

==== Fifth qualifier ====
First round
5	(United States) Claire Liu	7^{7}	6
WC	(Romania) Ștefania Bojică	6^{3}	1
(Germany) Laura Siegemund	3	1
10	(Ukraine) Dayana Yastremska	6	6

Qualifying competition
5	(United States) Claire Liu	3	6	4
10	(Ukraine) Dayana Yastremska	6	3	6

==== Sixth qualifier ====
First round
6	(Canada) Rebecca Marino	7	6
PR	Margarita Betova	5	3
WC	(Brazil) Luisa Stefani	7^{7}	3	1
8	(Belgium) Ysaline Bonaventure	6^{3}	6	6

Qualifying competition
6	(Canada) Rebecca Marino	6	6
8	(Belgium) Ysaline Bonaventure	1	4
