= 2023 San Diego Open – Singles =

Singles
- 2023 San Diego Open

Final
- Champion: (Czech Republic) Barbora Krejčíková
- Runner-up: (United States) Sofia Kenin
- Score: 6–4, 2–6, 6–4

Details
- Draw: 28 (4WC, 6Q)
- Seeds: 8

Events
Singles	Doubles
← 2022 ·	San Diego Open	· 2024 →

Barbora Krejčíková defeated Sofia Kenin in the final, 6–4, 2–6, 6–4 to win the singles title at the 2023 San Diego Open. It was the first final in the tournament’s history to be contested by two wildcards.

Iga Świątek was the reigning champion, but chose not to compete this year.

== Seeds ==
The top four seeds received a bye into the second round.

1. (Tunisia) Ons Jabeur (second round)
2. (France) Caroline Garcia (quarterfinals)
3. (Greece) Maria Sakkari (quarterfinals)
4. (Czech Republic) Barbora Krejčíková (champion)
5. (Switzerland) Belinda Bencic (first round)
6. Veronika Kudermetova (first round)
7. (Brazil) Beatriz Haddad Maia (quarterfinals)
8. Ekaterina Alexandrova (first round)

== Draw ==
=== Key ===
- Q = Qualifier
- WC = Wild card
- LL = Lucky loser
- Alt = Alternate
- ITF = ITF entry
- PR = Protected ranking
- SR = Special ranking
- SE = Special exempt
- JE = Junior exempt
- JR = Junior Accelerator Programme entrant
- CO = College Accelerator Programme entrant
- NG = Next Gen Accelerator Program entrant
- w/o = Walkover
- r = Retired
- d = Defaulted

=== Finals ===
Semifinals
WC	(United States) Sofia Kenin	6	5	6
Q	(United States) Emma Navarro	2	7	4
4/WC	(Czech Republic) Barbora Krejčíková	3	7	6
(United States) Danielle Collins	6	5	2

Final
WC	(United States) Sofia Kenin	4	6	4
4/WC	(Czech Republic) Barbora Krejčíková	6	2	6

=== Top half ===
First round
(United States) A Parks	2	7	4
A Potapova	6	5	6
WC	(United States) K Volynets	2	6	6
Q	(United States) C Ngounoue	6	4	2
WC	(United States) S Kenin	6	6
6	V Kudermetova	4	4
Q	(Poland) M Fręch	3	6	4
Q	(Colombia) C Osorio	6	1	6
(Italy) J Paolini	5	0
Q	(United States) E Navarro	7	6
Q	A Sasnovich	6	3	6
5	(Switzerland) B Bencic	3	6	2

Second round
1	(Tunisia) O Jabeur	4	6^{4}
A Potapova	6	7^{7}
WC	(United States) K Volynets	6	4	2
WC	(United States) S Kenin	1	6	6
3	(Greece) M Sakkari	6	2
Q	(Colombia) C Osorio	3	2^{r}
Q	(United States) E Navarro	7	6
Q	A Sasnovich	5	4

Quarterfinals
A Potapova	2	3
WC	(United States) S Kenin	6	6
3	(Greece) M Sakkari	4	6	6^{4}
Q	(United States) E Navarro	6	0	7^{7}

Semifinals
WC	(United States) S Kenin	6	5	6
Q	(United States) E Navarro	2	7	4

=== Bottom half ===
First round
7	(Brazil) B Haddad Maia	6	5	6
WC	(Canada) L Fernandez	3	7	2
(Poland) M Linette	2	6^{5}
(Ukraine) M Kostyuk	6	7^{7}
(Ukraine) A Kalinina	7^{7}	0	6
(Czech Republic) Ka Plíšková	6^{4}	6	3
8	E Alexandrova	6^{3}	7^{8}	5
(Latvia) J Ostapenko	7^{7}	6^{6}	7
Q	(United States) L Chirico	5	0
(United States) D Collins	7	6
(United States) S Stephens	6	6
(Belgium) E Mertens	1	3

Second round
7	(Brazil) B Haddad Maia	7	6^{3}	6
(Ukraine) M Kostyuk	5	7^{7}	2
(Ukraine) A Kalinina	3	2
4/WC	(Czech Republic) B Krejčíková	6	6
(Latvia) J Ostapenko	6	3	4
(United States) D Collins	2	6	6
(United States) S Stephens	3	6	1
2	(France) C Garcia	6	3	6

Quarterfinals
7	(Brazil) B Haddad Maia	4	3
4/WC	(Czech Republic) B Krejčíková	6	6
(United States) D Collins	6	6
2	(France) C Garcia	2	3

Semifinals
4/WC	(Czech Republic) B Krejčíková	3	7	6
(United States) D Collins	6	5	2

== Qualifying ==
=== Seeds ===
1. (Czech Republic) Kateřina Siniaková (first round)
2. (United States) Emma Navarro (qualified)
3. (Colombia) Camila Osorio (qualified)
4. (United States) Claire Liu (qualifying competition)
5. (Poland) Magdalena Fręch (qualified)
6. Aliaksandra Sasnovich (qualified)
7. (United States) Kayla Day (qualifying competition)
8. (United States) Madison Brengle (first round)
9. (United States) Caroline Dolehide (first round)
10. (Australia) Storm Hunter (first round)
11. Iryna Shymanovich (qualifying competition)
12. (United States) Hailey Baptiste (qualifying competition)

=== Qualifiers ===
1. (United States) Louisa Chirico
2. (United States) Emma Navarro
3. (Colombia) Camila Osorio
4. (United States) Clervie Ngounoue
5. (Poland) Magdalena Fręch
6. Aliaksandra Sasnovich

=== Qualifying draw ===
==== First qualifier ====
First round
1	(Czech Republic) Kateřina Siniaková	2	6	4
(Mexico) Renata Zarazúa	6	4	6
(United States) Louisa Chirico	7^{7}	6
9	(United States) Caroline Dolehide	6^{4}	2

Qualifying competition
(Mexico) Renata Zarazúa	3	6	4
(United States) Louisa Chirico	6	3	6

==== Second qualifier ====
First round
2	(United States) Emma Navarro	6	6
WC	(Morocco) Yasmine Kabbaj	1	2
(United States) Katrina Scott	3	3
11	Iryna Shymanovich	6	6

Qualifying competition
2	(United States) Emma Navarro	6	6
11	Iryna Shymanovich	3	1

==== Third qualifier ====
First round
3	(Colombia) Camila Osorio	6	6
(United States) Jamie Loeb	1	2
(Colombia) María Herazo González	1	3
7	(United States) Kayla Day	6	6

Qualifying competition
3	(Colombia) Camila Osorio	5	6	6
7	(United States) Kayla Day	7	4	3

==== Fourth qualifier ====
First round
4	(United States) Claire Liu	4	6	6
WC	(United States) Alyssa Ahn	6	1	2
WC	(United States) Clervie Ngounoue	7^{7}	6
10	(Australia) Storm Hunter	6^{3}	4

Qualifying competition
4	(United States) Claire Liu	4	2
WC	(United States) Clervie Ngounoue	6	6

==== Fifth qualifier ====
First round
5	(Poland) Magdalena Fręch	6	6
(Ukraine) Yulia Starodubtseva	1	3
(United States) Victoria Hu	4	0
12	(United States) Hailey Baptiste	6	6

Qualifying competition
5	(Poland) Magdalena Fręch	6	6^{4}	6
12	(United States) Hailey Baptiste	4	7^{7}	4

==== Sixth qualifier ====
First round
6	Aliaksandra Sasnovich	6	6
WC	(United States) Eryn Cayetano	1	4
(United States) Varvara Lepchenko	2	6	7
8	(United States) Madison Brengle	6	4	5

Qualifying competition
6	Aliaksandra Sasnovich	6	6
(United States) Varvara Lepchenko	3	2
