= 2023 Birmingham Classic – Singles =

Singles
- 2023 Birmingham Classic

Final
- Champion: (Latvia) Jeļena Ostapenko
- Runner-up: (Czech Republic) Barbora Krejčíková
- Score: 7–6^{(10–8)}, 6–4

Details
- Draw: 32 (6 Q / 4 WC )
- Seeds: 8

Events
Singles	Doubles
- Birmingham Classic

Jeļena Ostapenko defeated Barbora Krejčíková in the final, 7–6^{(10–8)}, 6–4 to win the singles tennis title at the 2023 Birmingham Classic.

Beatriz Haddad Maia was the reigning champion, but withdrew before the tournament began, due to a knee injury.

== Seeds ==
1. (Czech Republic) Barbora Krejčíková (final)
2. (Latvia) Jeļena Ostapenko (champion)
3. (Poland) Magda Linette (second round)
4. Anastasia Potapova (semifinals)
5. (Ukraine) Anhelina Kalinina (second round)
6. (United States) Bernarda Pera (second round)
7. (China) Zhang Shuai (first round)
8. (Romania) Sorana Cîrstea (second round)

== Draw ==
Key

- Q = Qualifier
- WC = Wild card
- LL = Lucky loser
- Alt = Alternate
- ITF = ITF entry
- PR = Protected ranking
- SR = Special ranking
- SE = Special exempt
- JE = Junior exempt
- JR = Junior Accelerator Programme entrant
- CO = College Accelerator Programme entrant
- NG = Next Gen Accelerator Program entrant
- w/o = Walkover
- r = Retired
- d = Defaulted

=== Finals ===
Semifinals
1	(Czech Republic) Barbora Krejčíková	6	6
(China) Zhu Lin	3	2
4	Anastasia Potapova	7	2	4
2	(Latvia) Jeļena Ostapenko	5	6	6

Final
1	(Czech Republic) Barbora Krejčíková	6^{8}	4
2	(Latvia) Jeļena Ostapenko	7^{10}	6

=== Top half ===
First round
1	(Czech Republic) B Krejčíková	6	6
Q	(Spain) C Bucșa	3	3
Q	(Czech Republic) T Martincová	6	6
LL	(Bulgaria) V Tomova	1	3
WC	(Ukraine) E Svitolina	2	0
(Czech Republic) L Fruhvirtová	6	6
(Czech Republic) M Bouzková	4	6^{3}
6	(United States) B Pera	6	7^{7}
3	(Poland) M Linette	3	7	6
(Italy) J Paolini	6	5	4
SE	(United Kingdom) K Boulter	5	5
(China) L Zhu	7	7
LL	(Canada) R Marino	7^{7}	5	6
Q	(China) Xiy Wang	6^{5}	7	3
Q	(United States) E Bektas	6	6
7	(China) S Zhang	4	3

Second round
1	(Czech Republic) B Krejčíková	6	6
Q	(Czech Republic) T Martincová	4	4
(Czech Republic) L Fruhvirtová	6	7^{7}
6	(United States) B Pera	1	6^{3}
3	(Poland) M Linette	3	0
(China) L Zhu	6	6
LL	(Canada) R Marino	6	4	7^{7}
Q	(United States) E Bektas	4	6	6^{1}

Quarterfinals
1	(Czech Republic) B Krejčíková	6	6
(Czech Republic) L Fruhvirtová	3	2
(China) L Zhu	4	6	6
LL	(Canada) R Marino	6	3	2

Semifinals
1	(Czech Republic) B Krejčíková	6	6
(China) L Zhu	3	2

=== Bottom half ===
First round
5	(Ukraine) A Kalinina	6	6
(United States) A Parks	4	4
WC	(United Kingdom) H Dart	4	6	7
WC	(United Kingdom) J Burrage	6	2	5
(United States) L Davis	1	5
(United States) C McNally	6	7
(Ukraine) M Kostyuk	7^{8}	5	4
4	A Potapova	6^{6}	7	6
8	(Romania) S Cîrstea	6	2	6
Q	(Romania) A Bogdan	4	6	3
Q	(Poland) M Fręch	7^{7}	6
PR	(Czech Republic) B Strýcová	6^{3}	1
WC	(United States) V Williams	7^{7}	4	7^{8}
(Italy) C Giorgi	6^{5}	6	6^{6}
(Czech Republic) L Nosková	2	7	1
2	(Latvia) J Ostapenko	6	5	6

Second round
5	(Ukraine) A Kalinina	3	6	1
WC	(United Kingdom) H Dart	6	3	6
(United States) C McNally	6	2	6^{0}
4	A Potapova	3	6	7^{7}
8	(Romania) S Cîrstea	3	7^{7}	4
Q	(Poland) M Fręch	6	6^{1}	6
WC	(United States) V Williams	3	7	3
2	(Latvia) J Ostapenko	6	5	6

Quarterfinals
WC	(United Kingdom) H Dart	6	3	4
4	A Potapova	4	6	6
Q	(Poland) M Fręch	6	5	2
2	(Latvia) J Ostapenko	4	7	6

Semifinals
4	A Potapova	7	2	4
2	(Latvia) J Ostapenko	5	6	6

== Qualifying ==
=== Seeds ===
1. (Ukraine) Lesia Tsurenko (first round)
2. (Romania) Ana Bogdan (qualified)
3. Kamilla Rakhimova (first round)
4. (China) Wang Xiyu (qualified)
5. (Spain) Cristina Bucșa (qualified)
6. (Poland) Magdalena Fręch (qualified)
7. (Bulgaria) Viktoriya Tomova (qualifying competition, lucky loser)
8. (Canada) Rebecca Marino (qualifying competition, lucky loser)
9. (United States) Caroline Dolehide (first round)
10. (Spain) Nuria Párrizas Díaz (first round)
11. (United States) Madison Brengle (first round)
12. (Czech Republic) Tereza Martincová (qualified)

=== Qualifiers ===
1. (Czech Republic) Tereza Martincová
2. (Romania) Ana Bogdan
3. (United States) Emina Bektas
4. (China) Wang Xiyu
5. (Spain) Cristina Bucșa
6. (Poland) Magdalena Fręch

=== Lucky losers ===
1. (Bulgaria) Viktoriya Tomova
2. (Canada) Rebecca Marino

=== Qualifying draw ===
==== First qualifier ====
First round
1	(Ukraine) Lesia Tsurenko	2	2
(Ukraine) Dayana Yastremska	6	6
(France) Jessika Ponchet	6^{4}	3
12	(Czech Republic) Tereza Martincová	7^{7}	6

Qualifying competition
(Ukraine) Dayana Yastremska	3	6^{2}
12	(Czech Republic) Tereza Martincová	6	7^{7}

==== Second qualifier ====
First round
2	(Romania) Ana Bogdan	6	6
WC	(United Kingdom) Naiktha Bains	1	3
Anastasia Zakharova	2	6	3
8	(Canada) Rebecca Marino	6	4	6

Qualifying competition
2	(Romania) Ana Bogdan	6	4	6
8	(Canada) Rebecca Marino	4	6	4

==== Third qualifier ====
First round
3	Kamilla Rakhimova	1	2
(Mexico) Marcela Zacarías	6	6
(United States) Emina Bektas	6	7
9	(United States) Caroline Dolehide	3	5

Qualifying competition
(Mexico) Marcela Zacarías	3	0
(United States) Emina Bektas	6	6

==== Fourth qualifier ====
First round
4	(China) Wang Xiyu	6	7
WC	(United Kingdom) Emily Appleton	3	5
WC	(United Kingdom) Eden Silva	6	2	4
7	(Bulgaria) Viktoriya Tomova	3	6	6

Qualifying competition
4	(China) Wang Xiyu	6	6
7	(Bulgaria) Viktoriya Tomova	3	3

==== Fifth qualifier ====
First round
5	(Spain) Cristina Bucșa	6	6
PR	Margarita Betova	0	4
PR	(Australia) Daria Saville	6	0	6
11	(United States) Madison Brengle	4	6	2

Qualifying competition
5	(Spain) Cristina Bucșa	6	3	6
PR	(Australia) Daria Saville	4	6	1

==== Sixth qualifier ====
First round
6	(Poland) Magdalena Fręch	6^{6}	6	6
WC	(United Kingdom) Amelia Rajecki	7^{8}	2	2
(Switzerland) Jil Teichmann	6	6
10	(Spain) Nuria Párrizas Díaz	4	1

Qualifying competition
6	(Poland) Magdalena Fręch	6	4	7
(Switzerland) Jil Teichmann	4	6	5
