= 2023 San Diego Open – Doubles =

Doubles
- 2023 San Diego Open

Final
- Champions: (Czech Republic) Barbora Krejčíková (Czech Republic) Kateřina Siniaková
- Runners-up: (United States) Danielle Collins (United States) CoCo Vandeweghe
- Score: 6–1, 6–4

Details
- Draw: 16 (2WC)
- Seeds: 4

Events
Singles	Doubles
← 2022 ·	San Diego Open	· 2024 →

Barbora Krejčíková and Kateřina Siniaková defeated Danielle Collins and CoCo Vandeweghe in the final, 6–1, 6–4 to win the doubles title at the 2023 San Diego Open. By winning the title, Siniaková reclaimed the WTA No. 1 doubles ranking from Coco Gauff and Jessica Pegula. This was Vandeweghe's final match as a professional tennis player.

Gauff and Pegula were the reigning champions, but chose not to defend their title.

== Seeds ==
1. (Czech Republic) Barbora Krejčíková / (Czech Republic) Kateřina Siniaková (champions)
2. (Japan) Shuko Aoyama / (China) Yang Zhaoxuan (semifinals)
3. (Chinese Taipei) Chan Hao-ching / (Mexico) Giuliana Olmos (first round)
4. (Ukraine) Lyudmyla Kichenok / (Latvia) Jeļena Ostapenko (quarterfinals)

== Draw ==
Key

- Q = Qualifier
- WC = Wild card
- LL = Lucky loser
- Alt = Alternate
- ITF = ITF entry
- PR = Protected ranking
- SR = Special ranking
- SE = Special exempt
- JE = Junior exempt
- JR = Junior Accelerator Programme entrant
- CO = College Accelerator Programme entrant
- NG = Next Gen Accelerator Program entrant
- w/o = Walkover
- r = Retired
- d = Defaulted

=== Draw ===
First round
1	(Czech Republic) B Krejčíková (Czech Republic) K Siniaková	7^{7}	7
(France) C Garcia (Netherlands) D Schuurs	6^{4}	5
E Alexandrova; A Sasnovich	7^{8}	6
(United States) C Dolehide (United States) C Liu	6^{6}	4
3	(Chinese Taipei) H-c Chan (Mexico) G Olmos	6	3	[2]
(Japan) M Kato (Indonesia) A Sutjiadi	4	6	[10]
(Georgia (country)) O Kalashnikova (Czech Republic) M Kolodziejová	6^{6}	6	[6]
(Slovakia) T Mihalíková (China) Y Xu	7^{8}	4	[10]
(Ukraine) M Kostyuk (United States) A Parks	3	6	[3]
WC	(United States) D Collins (United States) C Vandeweghe	6	4	[10]
(United States) S Santamaria; I Shymanovich	7	6^{5}	[9]
4	(Ukraine) L Kichenok (Latvia) J Ostapenko	5	7^{7}	[11]
(Kazakhstan) A Danilina (United States) B Mattek-Sands	6	7^{7}
(Norway) U Eikeri (Estonia) I Neel	3	6^{4}
(Chile) A Guarachi (Romania) M Niculescu	1	5
2	(Japan) S Aoyama (China) Z Yang	6	7

Quarterfinals
1	(Czech Republic) B Krejčíková (Czech Republic) K Siniaková	6	6
E Alexandrova; A Sasnovich	4	1
(Japan) M Kato (Indonesia) A Sutjiadi	6	7
(Slovakia) T Mihalíková (China) Y Xu	4	5
WC	(United States) D Collins (United States) C Vandeweghe	2	7	[11]
4	(Ukraine) L Kichenok (Latvia) J Ostapenko	6	5	9
(Kazakhstan) A Danilina (United States) B Mattek-Sands	6	3	[2]
2	(Japan) S Aoyama (China) Z Yang	1	6	[10]

Semifinals
1	(Czech Republic) B Krejčíková (Czech Republic) K Siniaková	6	7
(Japan) M Kato (Indonesia) A Sutjiadi	4	5
WC	(United States) D Collins (United States) C Vandeweghe	7	4	[10]
2	(Japan) S Aoyama (China) Z Yang	5	6	[7]

Final
1	(Czech Republic) B Krejčíková (Czech Republic) K Siniaková	6	6
WC	(United States) D Collins (United States) C Vandeweghe	1	4
