= 2024 San Diego Open =

- Date: 26 February – 3 March
- Edition: 38th (3rd as WTA 500 event)
- Category: WTA 500
- Draw: 28S / 16D
- Prize money: $922,573
- Surface: Hard
- Location: San Diego, United States
- Venue: Barnes Tennis Center

Champions

Singles
- (United Kingdom) Katie Boulter

Doubles
- (United States) Nicole Melichar-Martinez / (Australia) Ellen Perez
← 2023 ·	San Diego Open

The 2024 San Diego Open (also known as the Cymbiotika San Diego Open for sponsorship reasons) was a women's tennis tournament played on outdoor hard courts. It was the 3rd edition of the tournament, which is a WTA 500 event on the 2024 WTA Tour. It was held at the Barnes Tennis Center in San Diego, United States, from 26 February to 3 March 2024.

== Champions ==
=== Singles ===
- (United Kingdom) Katie Boulter def. (Ukraine) Marta Kostyuk 5–7, 6–2, 6–2

=== Doubles ===
- (United States) Nicole Melichar-Martinez / (Australia) Ellen Perez def. (United States) Desirae Krawczyk / (United States) Jessica Pegula 6–1, 6–2

== Points and prize money ==
=== Point distribution ===
Event	W	F	SF	QF	Round of 16	Round of 32	Q	Q2	Q1
Singles	500	325	195	108	60	1	25	13	1
Doubles	500	325	195	108	1	—	—	—	—

=== Prize money ===
Event	W	F	SF	QF	Round of 16	Round of 32^{1}	Q2	Q1
Singles	$142,000	$87,655	$51,205	$24,200	$13,170	$8,860	$6,603	$3,380
Doubles *	$47,390	$28,720	$16,430	$8,510	$5,140	—	—	—

_{^{1} Qualifiers prize money is also the Round of 32 prize money}
_{* per team}

== Singles main-draw entrants ==
=== Seeds ===
Country	Player	Rank^{1}	Seed
USA	Jessica Pegula	5	1
BRA	Beatriz Haddad Maia	14	2
USA	Emma Navarro	23	3
	Anastasia Pavlyuchenkova	24	4
UKR	Dayana Yastremska	29	5
UKR	Marta Kostyuk	30	6
CRO	Donna Vekić	31	7
CAN	Leylah Fernandez	33	8

- ^{1} Rankings are as of 19 February 2024.

=== Other entrants ===
The following players received wildcards into the main draw:

- (United States) Katherine Hui
- (Australia) Taylah Preston
- (Denmark) Caroline Wozniacki

The following players received entry from the qualifying draw:

- (Japan) Mai Hontama
- (United States) Ann Li
- Marina Melnikova
- (Germany) Jule Niemeier
- (Australia) Daria Saville
- (Canada) Marina Stakusic

=== Withdrawals ===
- (Spain) Paula Badosa → replaced by (Czech Republic) Kateřina Siniaková
- Anna Kalinskaya → replaced by Anna Blinkova
- (Czech Republic) Karolína Muchová → replaced by (France) Varvara Gracheva
- (Netherlands) Arantxa Rus → replaced by (Poland) Magdalena Fręch

== Doubles main-draw entrants ==
=== Seeds ===
Country	Player	Country	Player	Rank^{1}	Seed
USA	Desirae Krawczyk	USA	Jessica Pegula	22	1
AUS	Storm Hunter	CZE	Kateřina Siniaková	25	2
USA	Nicole Melichar-Martinez	AUS	Ellen Perez	29	3
TPE	Chan Hao-ching	MEX	Giuliana Olmos	51	4

- ^{1} Rankings are as of 19 February 2024.

=== Other entrants ===
The following pair received a wildcard into the doubles main draw:

- (United States) Emily Deming / (United States) Ann Li

The following pair received entry as alternates:

- (Hungary) Dalma Gálfi / (Japan) Mai Hontama

=== Withdrawals ===
- (Croatia) Donna Vekić / (China) Zhu Lin → replaced by (Hungary) Dalma Gálfi / (Japan) Mai Hontama
