= 2023 Porsche Tennis Grand Prix – Singles =

Singles
- 2023 Porsche Tennis Grand Prix

Final
- Champion: (Poland) Iga Świątek
- Runner-up: Aryna Sabalenka
- Score: 6–3, 6–4

Details
- Draw: 28 (3WC, 4Q)
- Seeds: 8

Events
Singles	Doubles
← 2022 ·	Porsche Tennis Grand Prix	· 2024 →

Defending champion Iga Świątek defeated Aryna Sabalenka in a rematch of the previous year's final, 6–3, 6–4 to win the singles tennis title at the 2023 Stuttgart Open. The final marked the first time the top two players in the world contested a WTA Tour final since the 2018 Australian Open, and the first such match overall since 2019 WTA Finals. This was also the first time since 2005 that the two defending Stuttgart finalists returned to contest the following year's final.

== Seeds ==
The top four seeds received a bye into the second round.

1. (Poland) Iga Świątek (champion)
2. Aryna Sabalenka (final)
3. (Tunisia) Ons Jabeur (semifinals, retired)
4. (France) Caroline Garcia (quarterfinals)
5. (United States) Coco Gauff (second round)
6. (Kazakhstan) Elena Rybakina (second round, retired)
7. Daria Kasatkina (first round)
8. (Greece) Maria Sakkari (first round)

== Draw ==
=== Key ===
- Q = Qualifier
- WC = Wild card
- LL = Lucky loser
- Alt = Alternate
- SE = Special exempt
- PR = Protected ranking
- ITF = ITF entry
- JE = Junior exempt
- w/o = Walkover
- r = Retired
- d = Defaulted
- SR = Special ranking

=== Finals ===
Semifinals
1	(Poland) Iga Świątek	3
3	(Tunisia) Ons Jabeur	0^{r}
Anastasia Potapova	1	2
2	Aryna Sabalenka	6	6

Final
1	(Poland) Iga Świątek	6	6
2	Aryna Sabalenka	3	4

=== Top half ===
First round
(China) Q Zheng	6	6
LL	(United States) A Parks	4	4
E Alexandrova	6^{7}	6^{5}
(Croatia) D Vekić	7^{9}	7^{7}
(Czech Republic) Ka Plíšková	6	6
8	(Greece) M Sakkari	2	3
(Latvia) J Ostapenko	6	6
WC	(United Kingdom) E Raducanu	2	1
(Italy) M Trevisan	5	1^{r}
(Brazil) B Haddad Maia	7	1
WC	(Germany) J Niemeier	5	3
6	(Kazakhstan) E Rybakina	7	6

Second round
1	(Poland) I Świątek	6	6
(China) Q Zheng	1	4
(Croatia) D Vekić	2	7^{7}	6^{5}
(Czech Republic) Ka Plíšková	6	6^{5}	7^{7}
3	(Tunisia) O Jabeur	1	7	6
(Latvia) J Ostapenko	6	5	3
(Brazil) B Haddad Maia	6	3
6	(Kazakhstan) E Rybakina	1	1^{r}

Quarterfinals
1	(Poland) I Świątek	4	6	6
(Czech Republic) Ka Plíšková	6	1	2
3	(Tunisia) O Jabeur	6	6
(Brazil) B Haddad Maia	3	0

Semifinals
1	(Poland) I Świątek	3
3	(Tunisia) O Jabeur	0^{r}

=== Bottom half ===
First round
5	(United States) C Gauff	6	4	7^{7}
V Kudermetova	2	6	6^{3}
Q	(Croatia) P Martić	3	6	6^{4}
A Potapova	6	3	7^{7}
WC	(Germany) T Maria	6	4	7^{7}
Q	(Switzerland) Y In-Albon	2	6	6^{4}
7	D Kasatkina	1	1
WC	(Spain) P Badosa	6	6
Q	(Spain) C Bucșa	3	6	6
Q	(Germany) T Korpatsch	6	4	0
(Czech Republic) B Krejčíková	6	6
L Samsonova	2	0

Second round
5	(United States) C Gauff	2	3
A Potapova	6	6
WC	(Germany) T Maria	6^{5}	4
4	(France) C Garcia	7^{7}	6
WC	(Spain) P Badosa	6	6
Q	(Spain) C Bucșa	1	2
(Czech Republic) B Krejčíková	2	3
2	A Sabalenka	6	6

Quarterfinals
A Potapova	4	6	6
4	(France) C Garcia	6	3	3
WC	(Spain) P Badosa	6	4	4
2	A Sabalenka	4	6	6

Semifinals
A Potapova	1	2
2	A Sabalenka	6	6

== Qualifying ==
=== Seeds ===
1. (Croatia) Petra Martić (qualified)
2. (United States) Alycia Parks (qualifying competition, lucky loser)
3. (Czech Republic) Linda Fruhvirtová (qualifying competition)
4. (United States) Katie Volynets (qualifying competition)
5. (Spain) Cristina Bucșa (qualified)
6. (Germany) Tamara Korpatsch (qualified)
7. (Australia) Kimberly Birrell (first round)
8. (Switzerland) Ylena In-Albon (qualified)

=== Qualifiers ===
1. (Croatia) Petra Martić
2. (Germany) Tamara Korpatsch
3. (Switzerland) Ylena In-Albon
4. (Spain) Cristina Bucșa

=== Lucky loser ===
1. (United States) Alycia Parks

=== Qualifying draw ===
==== First qualifier ====
First round
1	(Croatia) Petra Martić	6	6
(Uzbekistan) Nigina Abduraimova	4	2
WC	(Germany) Sabine Lisicki	6	6
7	(Australia) Kimberly Birrell	3	4

Qualifying competition
1	(Croatia) Petra Martić	6	7
WC	(Germany) Sabine Lisicki	4	5

==== Second qualifier ====
First round
2	(United States) Alycia Parks	1	6	6
(Croatia) Ana Konjuh	6	2	4
(Liechtenstein) Kathinka von Deichmann	2	6^{5}
6	(Germany) Tamara Korpatsch	6	7^{7}

Qualifying competition
2	(United States) Alycia Parks	2	4
6	(Germany) Tamara Korpatsch	6	6

==== Third qualifier ====
First round
3	(Czech Republic) Linda Fruhvirtová	7^{7}	7^{7}
WC	(Germany) Ella Seidel	6^{5}	6^{4}
(Germany) Mona Barthel	3	7^{7}	5
8	(Switzerland) Ylena In-Albon	6	6^{2}	7

Qualifying competition
3	(Czech Republic) Linda Fruhvirtová	5	4
8	(Switzerland) Ylena In-Albon	7	6

==== Fourth qualifier ====
First round
4	(United States) Katie Volynets	2	7^{7}	6
(Ukraine) Dayana Yastremska	6	6^{3}	3
(Germany) Noma Noha Akugue	4	4
5	(Spain) Cristina Bucșa	6	6

Qualifying competition
4	(United States) Katie Volynets	5	7^{7}	6^{2}
5	(Spain) Cristina Bucșa	7	6^{4}	7^{7}
