= 2023 WTA German Open – Singles =

Singles
- 2023 WTA German Open

Final
- Champion: (Czech Republic) Petra Kvitová
- Runner-up: (Croatia) Donna Vekić
- Score: 6–2, 7–6^{(8–6)}

Details
- Draw: 32 (6 Q / 3 WC )
- Seeds: 8

Events
Singles	Doubles
- WTA German Open

Petra Kvitová defeated Donna Vekić in the final, 6–2, 7–6^{(8–6)} to win the singles tennis title at the 2023 WTA German Open. Kvitová did not lose a set, and only lost three service games, during the entire tournament. It was her 31st and final WTA Tour title.

Ons Jabeur was the defending champion, but lost in the first round to Jule Niemeier.

== Seeds ==
1. Aryna Sabalenka (second round)
2. (Kazakhstan) Elena Rybakina (second round)
3. (France) Caroline Garcia (quarterfinals)
4. (Tunisia) Ons Jabeur (first round)
5. (United States) Coco Gauff (second round)
6. (Greece) Maria Sakkari (semifinals)
7. (Czech Republic) Petra Kvitová (champion)
8. Daria Kasatkina (first round)

== Draw ==
Key

- Q = Qualifier
- WC = Wild card
- LL = Lucky loser
- Alt = Alternate
- ITF = ITF entry
- PR = Protected ranking
- SR = Special ranking
- SE = Special exempt
- JE = Junior exempt
- JR = Junior Accelerator Programme entrant
- CO = College Accelerator Programme entrant
- NG = Next Gen Accelerator Program entrant
- w/o = Walkover
- r = Retired
- d = Defaulted

=== Finals ===
Semifinals
Ekaterina Alexandrova	3	4
7	(Czech Republic) Petra Kvitová	6	6
6	(Greece) Maria Sakkari	4	6^{8}
(Croatia) Donna Vekić	6	7^{10}

Final
7	(Czech Republic) Petra Kvitová	6	7^{8}
(Croatia) Donna Vekić	2	6^{6}

=== Top half ===
First round
1	A Sabalenka	6	6
Q	V Zvonareva	3	2
WC	V Kudermetova	6	6
(China) Q Zheng	4	2
E Alexandrova	6	6
L Samsonova	4	3
(Czech Republic) K Siniaková	3	4
5	(United States) C Gauff	6	6
3	(France) C Garcia	7^{7}	6
WC	(Germany) S Lisicki	6^{2}	3
Q	(Australia) J Fourlis	3	7	0
Q	(China) Xin Wang	6	5	0^{r}
PR	(Argentina) N Podoroska	3	6	6
(Spain) R Masarova	6	3	2
(Czech Republic) Ka Plíšková	3	4
7	(Czech Republic) P Kvitová	6	6

Second round
1	A Sabalenka	2	6^{2}
WC	V Kudermetova	6	7^{7}
E Alexandrova	6	6
5	(United States) C Gauff	4	0
3	(France) C Garcia	6	6
Q	(Australia) J Fourlis	3	2
PR	(Argentina) N Podoroska	1	1
7	(Czech Republic) P Kvitová	6	6

Quarterfinals
WC	V Kudermetova
E Alexandrova	w/o
3	(France) C Garcia	4	6^{3}
7	(Czech Republic) P Kvitová	6	7^{7}

Semifinals
E Alexandrova	3	4
7	(Czech Republic) P Kvitová	6	6

=== Bottom half ===
First round
6	(Greece) M Sakkari	6	6
(France) A Cornet	4	2
V Azarenka	4	4
A Sasnovich	6	6
(Canada) B Andreescu	6^{0}	5
WC	(Czech Republic) M Vondroušová	7^{7}	7
Q	(Germany) J Niemeier	7^{7}	6
4	(Tunisia) O Jabeur	6^{4}	4
8	D Kasatkina	2	6	6^{7}
LL	E Avanesyan	6	3	7^{9}
Q	(Germany) L Siegemund	3	7^{7}	5
A Blinkova	6	6^{3}	7
(Croatia) D Vekić	6	6
V Gracheva	3	2
Q	P Kudermetova	4	2
2	(Kazakhstan) E Rybakina	6	6

Second round
6	(Greece) M Sakkari	6	6
A Sasnovich	2	1
WC	(Czech Republic) M Vondroušová	6	6
Q	(Germany) J Niemeier	3	5^{r}
LL	E Avanesyan	1	6	6
A Blinkova	6	3	2
(Croatia) D Vekić	6^{1}	6	6
2	(Kazakhstan) E Rybakina	7^{7}	3	4

Quarterfinals
6	(Greece) M Sakkari	7^{9}	6
WC	(Czech Republic) M Vondroušová	6^{7}	1
LL	E Avanesyan	2	6^{0}
(Croatia) D Vekić	6	7^{7}

Semifinals
6	(Greece) M Sakkari	4	6^{8}
(Croatia) D Vekić	6	7^{10}

== Qualifying ==
=== Seeds ===
1. (United States) Peyton Stearns (qualifying competition)
2. (China) Wang Xinyu (qualified)
3. Elina Avanesyan (qualifying competition, lucky loser)
4. (United States) Katie Volynets (first round)
5. (Australia) Kimberly Birrell (first round)
6. (Germany) Jule Niemeier (qualified)
7. (Belgium) Greet Minnen (qualifying competition)
8. Polina Kudermetova (qualified)
9. (Germany) Laura Siegemund (qualified)
10. (Canada) Carol Zhao (first round)
11. (Uzbekistan) Nigina Abduraimova (first round)
12. (Australia) Jaimee Fourlis (qualified)

=== Qualifiers ===
1. (Australia) Jaimee Fourlis
2. (China) Wang Xinyu
3. (Germany) Laura Siegemund
4. Polina Kudermetova
5. Vera Zvonareva
6. (Germany) Jule Niemeier

=== Lucky loser ===
1. Elina Avanesyan

=== Qualifying draw ===
==== First qualifier ====
First round
1	(United States) Peyton Stearns	7^{7}	1	6
Maria Timofeeva	6^{5}	6	3
WC	(Germany) Mara Guth	2	4
12	(Australia) Jaimee Fourlis	6	6

Qualifying competition
1	(United States) Peyton Stearns	4	6	4
12	(Australia) Jaimee Fourlis	6	2	6

==== Second qualifier ====
First round
2	(China) Wang Xinyu	6	6
WC	(Australia) Taylah Preston	1	2
(United States) CoCo Vandeweghe	6	6
10	(Canada) Carol Zhao	3	1

Qualifying competition
2	(China) Wang Xinyu	6	6
(United States) CoCo Vandeweghe	4	4

==== Third qualifier ====
First round
3	Elina Avanesyan	6	6
PR	(Bulgaria) Sesil Karatantcheva	1	3
WC	(Germany) Ella Seidel	4	3
9	(Germany) Laura Siegemund	6	6

Qualifying competition
3	Elina Avanesyan	5	2
9	(Germany) Laura Siegemund	7	6

==== Fourth qualifier ====
First round
4	(United States) Katie Volynets	3	4
(Switzerland) Susan Bandecchi	6	6
WC	(Germany) Lena Papadakis	4	0
8	Polina Kudermetova	6	6

Qualifying competition
(Switzerland) Susan Bandecchi	7	2	4
8	Polina Kudermetova	5	6	6

==== Fifth qualifier ====
First round
5	(Australia) Kimberly Birrell	5	6	4
PR	(Canada) Eugenie Bouchard	7	3	6
PR	Vera Zvonareva	6	1	6
11	(Uzbekistan) Nigina Abduraimova	2	6	2

Qualifying competition
PR	(Canada) Eugenie Bouchard	3	7	3
PR	Vera Zvonareva	6	5	6

==== Sixth qualifier ====
First round
6	(Germany) Jule Niemeier	4	6	6
(Germany) Noma Noha Akugue	6	2	3
Marina Melnikova	4	2
7	(Belgium) Greet Minnen	6	6

Qualifying competition
6	(Germany) Jule Niemeier	7^{7}	3	6
7	(Belgium) Greet Minnen	6^{2}	6	2
