= 2023 Birmingham Classic =

- Date: 19–25 June
- Edition: 41st
- Category: WTA 250 tournaments
- Draw: 32S / 16D
- Surface: Grass
- Location: Birmingham, United Kingdom
- Venue: Edgbaston Priory Club

Champions

Singles
- (Latvia) Jeļena Ostapenko

Doubles
- (Ukraine) Marta Kostyuk / (Czech Republic) Barbora Krejčíková
← 2022 ·	Birmingham Classic	· 2024 →

The 2023 Birmingham Classic (also known as the Rothesay Classic Birmingham for sponsorship reasons) was a women's tennis tournament that was played on outdoor grass courts. It was the 41st edition of the event, and a WTA 250 tournament on the 2023 WTA Tour. It took place at the Edgbaston Priory Club in Birmingham, United Kingdom, on 19–25 June 2023.

== Champions ==
=== Singles ===
- (Latvia) Jeļena Ostapenko def. (Czech Republic) Barbora Krejčíková, 7–6^{(10–8)}, 6–4

=== Doubles ===
- (Ukraine) Marta Kostyuk / (Czech Republic) Barbora Krejčíková def. (Australia) Storm Hunter / (United States) Alycia Parks, 6–2, 7–6^{(9–7)}

== Points distribution ==
Event	W	F	SF	QF	Round of 16	Round of 32^{1}	Q	Q2	Q1
Singles	280	180	110	60	30	1	18	12	1
Doubles	280	180	110	60	1	—	—	—	—

== Singles main draw entrants ==
=== Seeds ===
Country	Player	Rank^{1}	Seed
CZE	Barbora Krejčíková	12	1
LAT	Jeļena Ostapenko	17	2
POL	Magda Linette	21	3
	Anastasia Potapova	22	4
UKR	Anhelina Kalinina	25	5
USA	Bernarda Pera	27	6
CHN	Zhang Shuai	31	7
ROU	Sorana Cîrstea	32	8

- ^{1} Rankings are as of 12 June 2023.

=== Other entrants ===
The following players received wildcards into the main draw:

- (United Kingdom) Jodie Burrage
- (United Kingdom) Harriet Dart
- (Ukraine) Elina Svitolina
- (United States) Venus Williams

The following player received entry using a protected ranking:

- (Czech Republic) Barbora Strýcová

The following player received entry as a special exempt:

- (United Kingdom) Katie Boulter

The following players received entry from the qualifying draw:

- (United States) Emina Bektas
- (Romania) Ana Bogdan
- (Spain) Cristina Bucșa
- (Poland) Magdalena Fręch
- (Czech Republic) Tereza Martincová
- (China) Wang Xiyu

The following players received entry as lucky losers:

- (Canada) Rebecca Marino
- (Bulgaria) Viktoriya Tomova

=== Withdrawals ===
- (Brazil) Beatriz Haddad Maia → replaced by (Bulgaria) Viktoriya Tomova
- (Italy) Elisabetta Cocciaretto → replaced by (Canada) Rebecca Marino
- (United States) Madison Keys → replaced by (Czech Republic) Linda Fruhvirtová
- (Belgium) Elise Mertens → replaced by (United States) Lauren Davis
- (Australia) Ajla Tomljanović → replaced by (United States) Caty McNally

== Doubles main draw entrants ==
=== Seeds ===
Country	Player	Country	Player	Rank^{1}	Seed
UKR	Lyudmyla Kichenok	LAT	Jeļena Ostapenko	29	1
UKR	Marta Kostyuk	CZE	Barbora Krejčíková	32	2
AUS	Storm Hunter	USA	Alycia Parks	45	3
CZE	Miriam Kolodziejová	SVK	Tereza Mihalíková	89	4

- ^{1} Rankings are as of 12 June 2023.

=== Other entrants ===
The following pairs received wildcards into the doubles main draw:

- (United Kingdom) Alicia Barnett / (United Kingdom) Olivia Nicholls
- (United Kingdom) Freya Christie / (United Kingdom) Ali Collins
