= 2023 Eastbourne International =

- Date: 26 June–1 July
- Edition: 12th (men); 48th (women)
- Category: ATP 250 (men); WTA 500 (women)
- Draw: 28S / 16D (men); 32S / 16D (women)
- Prize money: €723,655 (men) (women)
- Surface: Grass
- Location: Eastbourne, United Kingdom
- Venue: Devonshire Park LTC

Champions

Men's singles
- (Argentina) Francisco Cerúndolo

Women's singles
- (United States) Madison Keys

Men's doubles
- (Croatia) Nikola Mektić / (Croatia) Mate Pavić

Women's doubles
- (United States) Desirae Krawczyk / (Netherlands) Demi Schuurs
← 2022 ·	Eastbourne International	· 2024 →

The 2023 Eastbourne International (also known as the Rothesay International Eastbourne for sponsorship reasons) was a combined men's and women's tennis tournament to be played on outdoor grass courts. It was the 48th edition of the event for the women and the 12th edition for the men. The tournament was classified as a WTA 500 tournament on the 2023 WTA Tour and as an ATP Tour 250 series on the 2023 ATP Tour. The tournament took place at the Devonshire Park Lawn Tennis Club in Eastbourne, United Kingdom between 26 June and 1 July 2023.

== Champions ==
=== Men's singles ===
- (Argentina) Francisco Cerúndolo def. (United States) Tommy Paul, 6–4, 1–6, 6–4

=== Women's singles ===
- (United States) Madison Keys def. Daria Kasatkina, 6–2, 7–6^{(15–13)}

=== Men's doubles ===
- (Croatia) Nikola Mektić / (Croatia) Mate Pavić def. (Croatia) Ivan Dodig / (United States) Austin Krajicek, 6–4, 6–2

=== Women's doubles ===
- (United States) Desirae Krawczyk / (Netherlands) Demi Schuurs def. (United States) Nicole Melichar-Martinez / (Australia) Ellen Perez, 6–2, 6–4

== Points and prize money ==
=== Point distribution ===
Event	W	F	SF	QF	Round of 16	Round of 32	Q	Q2	Q1
Men's singles	250	150	90	45	20	0	12	6	0
Men's doubles	250	150	90	45	0	—	—	—	—
Women's singles	470	305	185	100	55	1	25	13	1
Women's doubles	470	305	185	100	1	—	—	—	—

=== Prize money ===
Event	W	F	SF	QF	Round of 16	Round of 32	Q2	Q1
Men's singles	€110,070	€64,205	€37,750	€21,870	€12,700	€7,760	€3,880	€2,120
Men's doubles*	€38,250	€20,460	€12,000	€6,700	€3,950	—	—	—
Women's singles	$120,150	$74,161	$43,323	$20,465	$10,530	$6,870	$5,590	$2,860
Women's doubles*	$40,100	$24,300	$13,900	$7,200	$4,350	—	—	—

_{*per team}

== ATP singles main draw entrants ==
=== Seeds ===
Country	Player	Rank^{1}	Seed
USA	Taylor Fritz	8	1
USA	Tommy Paul	15	2
~~AUS~~	~~Alex de Minaur~~	~~18~~	~~3~~
ARG	Francisco Cerúndolo	19	4
CHI	Nicolás Jarry	28	5
ARG	Tomás Martín Etcheverry	30	6
ITA	Lorenzo Sonego	39	7
SRB	Miomir Kecmanović	40	8
NED	Botic van de Zandschulp	41	9

- ^{1} Rankings are as of 19 June 2023.

=== Other entrants ===
The following players received wildcards into the main draw:

- (United Kingdom) Liam Broady
- (United Kingdom) George Loffhagen
- (United Kingdom) Ryan Peniston

The following players received entry from the qualifying draw:

- (Colombia) Daniel Elahi Galán
- (Switzerland) Marc-Andrea Hüsler
- (France) Luca Van Assche
- (Australia) Aleksandar Vukic

The following player received entry as a lucky loser:

- (United Kingdom) Jan Choinski

=== Withdrawals ===
- (Australia) Alex de Minaur → replaced by (United Kingdom) Jan Choinski
- (Bulgaria) Grigor Dimitrov → replaced by (Portugal) Nuno Borges
- (United Kingdom) Jack Draper → replaced by (France) Grégoire Barrère
- (Japan) Yoshihito Nishioka → replaced by (United States) Mackenzie McDonald

== ATP doubles main draw entrants ==
=== Seeds ===
Country	Player	Country	Player	Rank^{1}	Seed
CRO	Ivan Dodig	USA	Austin Krajicek	8	1
USA	Rajeev Ram	GBR	Joe Salisbury	10	2
MON	Hugo Nys	POL	Jan Zieliński	19	3
CRO	Nikola Mektić	CRO	Mate Pavić	34	4

- ^{1} Rankings are as of 19 June 2023.

=== Other entrants ===
The following pairs received wildcards into the doubles main draw:

- (United Kingdom) Liam Broady / (United Kingdom) Jonny O'Mara
- (United Kingdom) Julian Cash / (United Kingdom) Luke Johnson

=== Withdrawals ===
- (El Salvador) Marcelo Arévalo / (Netherlands) Jean-Julien Rojer → replaced by (United States) Robert Galloway / (Mexico) Miguel Ángel Reyes-Varela
- (India) Rohan Bopanna / (Australia) Matthew Ebden → replaced by (Australia) Matthew Ebden / (Australia) John-Patrick Smith
- (Netherlands) Wesley Koolhof / (United Kingdom) Neal Skupski → replaced by (Sweden) André Göransson / (Japan) Ben McLachlan

== WTA singles main draw entrants ==
=== Seeds ===
Country	Player	Rank^{1}	Seed
~~KAZ~~	~~Elena Rybakina~~	~~3~~	~~1~~
FRA	Caroline Garcia	4	2
USA	Jessica Pegula	5	3
TUN	Ons Jabeur	6	4
USA	Coco Gauff	7	5
~~GRE~~	~~Maria Sakkari~~	~~8~~	~~6~~
~~CZE~~	~~Petra Kvitová~~	~~9~~	~~7~~
BRA	Beatriz Haddad Maia	10	8
	Daria Kasatkina	11	9
~~CZE~~	~~Barbora Krejčíková~~	~~12~~	~~10~~

- ^{1} Rankings are as of 19 June 2022.

=== Other entrants ===
The following players received wildcards into the main draw:

- (United Kingdom) Katie Boulter
- (United Kingdom) Harriet Dart
- (France) Caroline Garcia

The following player received entry using a protected ranking:

- ~~(Czech Republic) Markéta Vondroušová~~

The following players received entry from the qualifying draw:

- (Romania) Ana Bogdan
- (United States) Madison Brengle
- (United States) Lauren Davis
- (Colombia) Camila Osorio
- (Italy) Jasmine Paolini
- (China) Wang Xiyu

The following players received entry as lucky losers:

- (United Kingdom) Jodie Burrage
- ~~(Czech Republic) Linda Fruhvirtová~~
- (Canada) Rebecca Marino
- (Croatia) Petra Martić
- (Czech Republic) Tereza Martincová
- (Czech Republic) Barbora Strýcová
- (United Kingdom) Heather Watson

=== Withdrawals ===
- (Spain) Paula Badosa → replaced by (Czech Republic) Marie Bouzková
- (Czech Republic) Barbora Krejčiková → replaced by (Canada) Rebecca Marino
- (Czech Republic) Petra Kvitová → replaced by (Czech Republic) Barbora Strýcová
- (Poland) Magda Linette → replaced by (United States) Shelby Rogers
- Anastasia Potapova → replaced by (United Kingdom) Heather Watson
- (Kazakhstan) Elena Rybakina → replaced by (Croatia) Petra Martić
- (Greece) Maria Sakkari → replaced by (Czech Republic) Tereza Martincová
- (Czech Republic) Markéta Vondroušová → replaced by (United Kingdom) Jodie Burrage

== WTA doubles main draw entrants ==
=== Seeds ===
Country	Player	Country	Player	Rank^{1}	Seed
USA	Coco Gauff	USA	Jessica Pegula	7	1
USA	Nicole Melichar-Martinez	AUS	Ellen Perez	17	2
USA	Desirae Krawczyk	NED	Demi Schuurs	24	3
UKR	Lyudmyla Kichenok	LAT	Jeļena Ostapenko	31	4

- ^{1} Rankings are as of 19 June 2023.

=== Other entrants ===
The following pairs received wildcards into the doubles main draw:

- (United Kingdom) Harriet Dart / (United Kingdom) Heather Watson
- (Czech Republic) Tereza Martincová / (Czech Republic) Barbora Strýcová
