= 2023 San Diego Open =

- Date: 11–16 September
- Edition: 37th (2nd as WTA 500 event)
- Category: WTA 500
- Draw: 28S / 16D
- Prize money: $780,637
- Surface: Hard
- Location: San Diego, United States
- Venue: Barnes Tennis Center

Champions

Singles
- (Czech Republic) Barbora Krejčíková

Doubles
- (Czech Republic) Barbora Krejčíková / (Czech Republic) Kateřina Siniaková
← 2022 ·	San Diego Open	· 2024 →

The 2023 San Diego Open (also known as the Cymbiotika San Diego Open presented by ResMed for sponsorship reasons) was a women's tennis tournament played on outdoor hard courts. It was the 2nd edition of the women's event, which is a WTA 500 event on the 2023 WTA Tour. It was held at the Barnes Tennis Center in San Diego, United States, from 11 to 16 September 2023. The men's event was discontinued this year following the return of the ATP Tour to China.

== Champions ==
=== Singles ===
- (Czech Republic) Barbora Krejčíková def. (United States) Sofia Kenin 6–4, 2–6, 6–4

=== Doubles ===
- (Czech Republic) Barbora Krejčíková / (Czech Republic) Kateřina Siniaková def. (United States) Danielle Collins / (United States) CoCo Vandeweghe 6–1, 6–4

== Singles main-draw entrants ==
=== Seeds ===
Country	Player	Rank^{1}	Seed
TUN	Ons Jabeur	5	1
FRA	Caroline Garcia	7	2
GRE	Maria Sakkari	8	3
CZE	Barbora Krejčíková	12	4
SUI	Belinda Bencic	13	5
	Veronika Kudermetova	16	6
BRA	Beatriz Haddad Maia	19	7
	Ekaterina Alexandrova	20	8

- ^{1} Rankings are as of 28 August 2023.

=== Other entrants ===
The following players received wildcards into the main draw:

- (Canada) Leylah Fernandez
- (United States) Sofia Kenin
- (Czech Republic) Barbora Krejčíková
- (United States) Katie Volynets

The following players received entry from the qualifying draw:

- (United States) Louisa Chirico
- (Poland) Magdalena Fręch
- (United States) Emma Navarro
- (United States) Clervie Ngounoue
- (Colombia) Camila Osorio
- Aliaksandra Sasnovich

=== Withdrawals ===
- Victoria Azarenka → replaced by (United States) Alycia Parks
- (United States) Coco Gauff → replaced by (United States) Sloane Stephens
- (United States) Madison Keys → replaced by (United States) Danielle Collins
- (Croatia) Donna Vekić → replaced by (Italy) Jasmine Paolini

== Doubles main-draw entrants ==
=== Seeds ===
Country	Player	Country	Player	Rank^{1}	Seed
CZE	Barbora Krejčíková	CZE	Kateřina Siniaková	3	1
JPN	Shuko Aoyama	CHN	Yang Zhaoxuan	34	2
TPE	Chan Hao-ching	MEX	Giuliana Olmos	39	3
UKR	Lyudmyla Kichenok	LAT	Jeļena Ostapenko	50	4

- ^{1} Rankings are as of 28 August 2023.

=== Other entrants ===
The following pair received a wildcard into the doubles main draw:

- (United States) Danielle Collins / (United States) CoCo Vandeweghe
