= 2023 Abu Dhabi Open =

- Date: 6–12 February
- Edition: 2nd
- Category: WTA 500
- Draw: 28S / 16D
- Prize money: $780,637
- Surface: Hard / outdoor
- Location: Abu Dhabi, UAE
- Venue: Zayed Sports City International Tennis Centre

Champions

Singles
- (Switzerland) Belinda Bencic

Doubles
- (Brazil) Luisa Stefani / (China) Zhang Shuai
- Abu Dhabi Open

The 2023 Mubadala Abu Dhabi Open was a professional women's tennis tournament played on outdoor hard courts. It was the second edition of the tournament as a WTA 500 event on the 2023 WTA Tour. It took place at the Zayed Sports City International Tennis Centre in Abu Dhabi, from 6 to 12 February 2023. The tournament returned to the WTA Tour after two years due to the suspension of St. Petersburg Ladies' Trophy as a result of the Russian invasion of Ukraine.

== Finals ==
=== Singles ===
- (Switzerland) Belinda Bencic def. Liudmila Samsonova 1–6, 7–6^{(10–8)}, 6–4

=== Doubles ===
- (Brazil) Luisa Stefani / (China) Zhang Shuai def. (Japan) Shuko Aoyama / (Chinese Taipei) Chan Hao-ching, 3–6, 6–2, [10–8]

== Points and prize money ==
=== Point distribution ===
Event	W	F	SF	QF	Round of 16	Round of 32	Q	Q2	Q1
Singles	470	305	185	100	55	1	25	13	1
Doubles	470	305	185	100	1	—N/a	—N/a	—N/a	—N/a

=== Prize money ===
Event	W	F	SF	QF	Round of 16	Round of 32	Q2	Q1
Singles	$120,150	$74,161	$43,323	$20,465	$11,145	$7,500	$5,590	$2,860
Doubles	$40,100	$24,300	$13,900	$7,200	$5,750	$4,350	—N/a	—N/a
Doubles prize money per team

== Singles main-draw entrants ==
=== Seeds ===
Country	Player	Rank^{1}	Seed
	Daria Kasatkina	8	1
SUI	Belinda Bencic	9	2
KAZ	Elena Rybakina	10	3
	Veronika Kudermetova	11	4
LAT	Jeļena Ostapenko	12	5
BRA	Beatriz Haddad Maia	14	6
EST	Anett Kontaveit	18	7
	Liudmila Samsonova	19	8

- ^{1} Rankings are as of January 30, 2023

=== Other entrants ===
The following players received a wildcard into the singles main draw:

- (Romania) Sorana Cîrstea
- (Ukraine) Marta Kostyuk
- (Spain) ~~Garbiñe Muguruza~~

The following players received entry using a protected ranking into the singles main draw:

- (Canada) Bianca Andreescu

The following players received entry from the qualifying draw:

- (Canada) Leylah Fernandez
- (Canada) Rebecca Marino
- (Kazakhstan) Yulia Putintseva
- (United States) Shelby Rogers
- (Romania) Elena-Gabriela Ruse
- (Ukraine) Dayana Yastremska

=== Withdrawals ===
Before the tournament

- (United States) Amanda Anisimova → replaced by (China) Zheng Qinwen
- (Spain) Paula Badosa → replaced by (United States) Claire Liu
- (Tunisia) Ons Jabeur → replaced by (Czech Republic) Karolína Plíšková
- (Spain) Garbiñe Muguruza → replaced by (Belgium) Ysaline Bonaventure

=== Retirements ===
- (Estonia) Anett Kontaveit (lower back injury)

== Doubles main-draw entrants ==
=== Seeds ===
Country	Player	Country	Player	Rank^{1}	Seed
USA	Desirae Krawczyk	MEX	Giuliana Olmos	21	1
KAZ	Anna Danilina	UKR	Lyudmyla Kichenok	34	2
USA	Nicole Melichar-Martinez	AUS	Ellen Perez	35	3
CHN	Yang Zhaoxuan		Vera Zvonareva	50	4

- Rankings are as of January 30, 2023

=== Other entrants ===
The following pair received wildcards into the doubles main draw:

- (United States) Bethanie Mattek-Sands / (India) Sania Mirza

=== Withdrawals ===
Before the tournament

- (United States) Desirae Krawczyk / (Netherlands) Demi Schuurs → replaced by (United States) Desirae Krawczyk / (Mexico) Giuliana Olmos

During the tournament

- (Switzerland) Belinda Bencic / (Belgium) Elise Mertens (fatigue)
