= 2023 Porsche Tennis Grand Prix =

Women's tennis tournament

- Date: 17–23 April
- Edition: 45th
- Category: WTA 500
- Draw: 28S / 16D
- Prize money: $780,637
- Surface: Clay (indoor)
- Location: Stuttgart, Germany
- Venue: Porsche-Arena

Champions

Singles
- (Poland) Iga Świątek

Doubles
- (United States) Desirae Krawczyk / (Netherlands) Demi Schuurs
← 2022 ·	Porsche Tennis Grand Prix	· 2024 →

The 2023 Porsche Tennis Grand Prix was a women's professional tennis tournament played on indoor clay courts at the Porsche Arena in Stuttgart, Germany, from 17 April until 23 April 2023. It was the 45th edition of the Porsche Tennis Grand Prix and is classified as a WTA 500 tournament on the 2023 WTA Tour. First-seeded Iga Świątek won the singles title.

== Finals ==
=== Singles ===
- (Poland) Iga Świątek defeated Aryna Sabalenka 6–3, 6–4

=== Doubles ===
- (United States) Desirae Krawczyk / (Netherlands) Demi Schuurs defeated (United States) Nicole Melichar-Martinez / (Mexico) Giuliana Olmos 6–4, 6–1

== Point distribution ==
Event	W	F	SF	QF	Round of 16	Round of 32	Q	Q2	Q1
Singles	470	305	185	100	55	1	25	13	1
Doubles	470	305	185	100	1	—	—	—	—

== Singles main draw entrants ==
=== Seeds ===
Country	Player	Rank	Seed
POL	Iga Świątek	1	1
	Aryna Sabalenka	2	2
TUN	Ons Jabeur	4	3
FRA	Caroline Garcia	5	4
USA	Coco Gauff	6	5
KAZ	Elena Rybakina	7	6
	Daria Kasatkina	8	7
GRE	Maria Sakkari	9	8

- Rankings are as of 10 April 2023.

=== Other entrants ===
The following players received wildcards into the main draw:

- (Spain) Paula Badosa
- (Germany) Tatjana Maria
- (Germany) Jule Niemeier
- (United Kingdom) Emma Raducanu

The following players received entry from the qualifying draw:

- (Spain) Cristina Bucșa
- (Switzerland) Ylena In-Albon
- (Germany) Tamara Korpatsch
- (Croatia) Petra Martić

The following player received entry as a lucky loser:

- (United States) Alycia Parks

=== Withdrawals ===
- (Switzerland) Belinda Bencic → replaced by Anastasia Potapova
- (Czech Republic) Petra Kvitová → replaced by (United States) Alycia Parks

== Doubles main draw entrants ==
Country	Player	Country	Player	Rank	Seed
UKR	Lyudmyla Kichenok	LAT	Jeļena Ostapenko	18	1
USA	Desirae Krawczyk	NED	Demi Schuurs	21	2
USA	Nicole Melichar-Martinez	MEX	Giuliana Olmos	21	3
CAN	Gabriela Dabrowski	BRA	Luisa Stefani	34	4

- Rankings as of 10 April 2023.

=== Other entrants ===
The following pair received a wildcard into the doubles main draw:

- (Germany) Mona Barthel / (Germany) Anna-Lena Friedsam

The following pair received entry as alternates:

- (Germany) Vivian Heisen / (Estonia) Ingrid Neel

=== Withdrawals ===
- (Czech Republic) Linda Fruhvirtová / (Brazil) Ingrid Gamarra Martins → replaced by (Germany) Vivian Heisen / (Estonia) Ingrid Neel
