= 2023 WTA German Open =

- Date: 19–25 June
- Edition: 100th
- Category: WTA 500
- Draw: 32S / 24Q / 16D
- Prize money: $780,637
- Surface: Grass
- Location: Berlin, Germany
- Venue: Rot-Weiss Tennis Club

Champions

Singles
- (Czech Republic) Petra Kvitová

Doubles
- (France) Caroline Garcia / (Brazil) Luisa Stefani
- WTA German Open

The 2023 WTA German Open (also known as the bett1open for sponsorship purposes) was a professional tennis tournament played on outdoor grass courts at the Rot-Weiss Tennis Club in Berlin, Germany from 19 June to 25 June 2023. It was the 100th edition of the event, the third year it was organized on grass, classed as a WTA 500 on the 2023 WTA Tour.

== Finals ==
=== Singles ===
- (Czech Republic) Petra Kvitová defeated (Croatia) Donna Vekić, 6–2, 7–6^{(8–6)}

=== Doubles ===
- (France) Caroline Garcia / (Brazil) Luisa Stefani defeated (Czech Republic) Kateřina Siniaková / (Czech Republic) Markéta Vondroušová 4–6, 7–6^{(10–8)}, [10–4]

== Point distribution ==
Event	W	F	SF	QF	Round of 16	Round of 32	Q	Q2	Q1
Singles	470	305	185	100	55	1	25	13	1
Doubles	470	305	185	100	1	—N/a	—N/a	—N/a	—N/a

== Singles main-draw entrants ==
=== Seeds ===
Country	Player	Rank	Seed
	Aryna Sabalenka	2	1
KAZ	Elena Rybakina	3	2
FRA	Caroline Garcia	4	3
TUN	Ons Jabeur	6	4
USA	Coco Gauff	7	5
GRE	Maria Sakkari	8	6
CZE	Petra Kvitová	9	7
	Daria Kasatkina	11	8

- Rankings are as of 12 June 2023.

=== Other entrants ===
The following players received wildcards into the singles main draw:

- Veronika Kudermetova
- (Germany) Sabine Lisicki
- (Czech Republic) Markéta Vondroušová

The following player received entry using a protected ranking into the main draw:

- (Argentina) Nadia Podoroska

The following players received entry from the qualifying draw:

- (Australia) Jaimee Fourlis
- Polina Kudermetova
- (Germany) Jule Niemeier
- (Germany) Laura Siegemund
- (China) Wang Xinyu
- Vera Zvonareva

The following player received entry as a lucky loser:

- Elina Avanesyan

=== Withdrawals ===
- (Spain) Paula Badosa → replaced by (Czech Republic) Kateřina Siniaková
- (Switzerland) Belinda Bencic → replaced by (Canada) Bianca Andreescu
- (Croatia) Petra Martić → replaced by Elina Avanesyan
- (United States) Jessica Pegula → replaced by (Argentina) Nadia Podoroska
- (United States) Shelby Rogers → replaced by Aliaksandra Sasnovich
- (United States) Sloane Stephens → replaced by Varvara Gracheva
- (Italy) Martina Trevisan → replaced by Anna Blinkova

== Doubles main draw entrants ==
=== Seeds ===
Country	Player	Country	Player	Rank	Seed
USA	Nicole Melichar-Martinez	AUS	Ellen Perez	17	1
USA	Desirae Krawczyk	NED	Demi Schuurs	24	2
JPN	Shuko Aoyama	JPN	Ena Shibahara	41	3
KAZ	Anna Danilina	CHN	Xu Yifan	51	4

- Rankings are as of 12 June 2023.

=== Other entrants ===
The following pairs received wildcards into the doubles main draw:

- Daria Kasatkina / (Germany) Sabine Lisicki
- (Germany) Jule Niemeier / (Germany) Noma Noha Akugue
