= 2023 National Bank Open =

Canadian tennis tournament

- Date: August 7–13, 2023
- Edition: 133rd (men) / 121st (women)
- Category: ATP Tour Masters 1000 (men); WTA 1000 (women)
- Draw: 56S / 28D
- Prize money: $6,600,000 (men) $2,788,468 (women)
- Surface: Hard / outdoor
- Location: Toronto, Ontario, Canada (men); Montreal, Quebec, Canada (women)

Champions

Men's singles
- (Italy) Jannik Sinner

Women's singles
- (United States) Jessica Pegula

Men's doubles
- (El Salvador) Marcelo Arévalo / (Netherlands) Jean-Julien Rojer

Women's doubles
- (Japan) Shuko Aoyama / (Japan) Ena Shibahara
- Canadian Open (tennis)

The 2023 Canadian Open championships (branded as the National Bank Open presented by Rogers for sponsorship reasons) were outdoor hard court tennis tournaments played from August 7 to August 13, 2023. The men's tournament took place at the Sobeys Stadium in Toronto and the women's event took place at the IGA Stadium in Montreal. It was the 133rd edition of the men's tournament—a mandatory Masters 1000 event on the 2023 ATP Tour, and the 121st edition of the women's tournament—a non-mandatory WTA 1000 event on the 2023 WTA Tour.

== Points and prize money ==
=== Point distribution ===
| Event | W | F | SF | QF | Round of 16 | Round of 32 | Round of 64 | Q | Q2 | Q1 |
| Men's singles | 1000 | 600 | 360 | 180 | 90 | 45 | 10 | 25 | 16 | 0 |
| Men's doubles | 1000 | 600 | 360 | 180 | 90 | 0 | —N/a | —N/a | —N/a | —N/a |
| Women's singles | 900 | 585 | 350 | 190 | 105 | 60 | 1 | 30 | 20 | 1 |
| Women's doubles | 900 | 585 | 350 | 190 | 105 | 5 | —N/a | —N/a | —N/a | —N/a |

=== Prize money ===
| Event | W | F | SF | QF | Round of 16 | Round of 32 | Round of 64 | Q2 | Q1 |
| Men's singles | $1,019,335 | $556,630 | $304,375 | $166,020 | $88,805 | $47,620 | $26,380 | $13,515 | $7,080 |
| Women's singles | $454,500 | $267,690 | $138,000 | $63,350 | $31,650 | $17,930 | $12,848 | $7,650 | $4,000 |
| Men's doubles* | $312,740 | $169,880 | $93,310 | $51,470 | $28,310 | $13,510 | —N/a | —N/a | —N/a |
| Women's doubles* | $133,840 | $75,286 | $40,432 | $20,914 | $11,850 | $7,900 | —N/a | —N/a | —N/a |

_{*per team}

== Champions ==
=== Men's singles ===
- (Italy) Jannik Sinner def. (Australia) Alex de Minaur, 6–4, 6–1

=== Women's singles ===
- (United States) Jessica Pegula def. Liudmila Samsonova, 6–1, 6–0

This was Pegula's third career title, and her first of the year.

=== Men's doubles ===
- (El Salvador) Marcelo Arévalo / (Netherlands) Jean-Julien Rojer def. (United States) Rajeev Ram / (United Kingdom) Joe Salisbury, 6–3, 6–1

=== Women's doubles ===
- (Japan) Shuko Aoyama / (Japan) Ena Shibahara def. (United States) Desirae Krawczyk / (Netherlands) Demi Schuurs, 6–4, 4–6, [13–11]
