= 2015 Kirkland Tennis Challenger – Doubles =

Doubles
- 2015 Kirkland Tennis Challenger

Final
- Champions: (France) Stéphanie Foretz (Luxembourg) Mandy Minella
- Runners-up: (Netherlands) Lesley Kerkhove (Netherlands) Arantxa Rus
- Score: 6–4, 4–6, [10–4]

Events
Singles	Doubles
← 2014 ·	Kirkland Tennis Challenger	· 2016 →

This was a new event in the ITF Women's Circuit.

The top seeds Stéphanie Foretz and Mandy Minella won the inaugural title, defeating the Dutch-pair Lesley Kerkhove and Arantxa Rus in the final, 6–4, 4–6, [10–4].

== Seeds ==
1. (France) Stéphanie Foretz / (Luxembourg) Mandy Minella (champions)
2. (Brazil) Paula Cristina Gonçalves / (United States) Sanaz Marand (quarterfinals)
3. (Canada) Sharon Fichman / (United States) Taylor Townsend (first round)
4. (Germany) Antonia Lottner / (Greece) Despina Papamichail (semifinals)

== Draw ==
=== Key ===
- Q = Qualifier
- WC = Wild card
- LL = Lucky loser
- Alt = Alternate
- ITF = ITF entry
- PR = Protected ranking
- SR = Special ranking
- SE = Special exempt
- JE = Junior exempt
- JR = Junior Accelerator Programme entrant
- CO = College Accelerator Programme entrant
- NG = Next Gen Accelerator Program entrant
- w/o = Walkover
- r = Retired
- d = Defaulted

First round
1	(France) S Foretz (Luxembourg) M Minella	6	6
(Chile) A Guarachi (United States) D Lao	1	4
(United States) J Boserup (United States) N Gibbs	6	2	[12]
(United States) J Cako (United States) K Christian	2	6	[10]
4	(Germany) A Lottner (Greece) D Papamichail	6	3	[10]
(United States) E Halbauer (United States) A Morozova	1	6	[6]
(Poland) J Jegiołka (United States) A Stevenson
(United States) K Fleischman (United States) V Glozman	w/o
(United States) J Brady (United States) M Oudin	5	6	[3]
(United States) S Crawford (United States) A Weinhold	7	4	[10]
(United States) G Brodsky (Mexico) S León	6	6
3	(Canada) S Fichman (United States) T Townsend	4	4
(United States) A Facey (United States) K Facey	2	2
(Netherlands) L Kerkhove (Netherlands) A Rus	6	6
(Serbia) J Jakšić (United States) J Pegula	2	4
2	(Brazil) PC Gonçalves (United States) S Marand	6	6

Quarterfinals
1	(France) S Foretz (Luxembourg) M Minella	6	1	[14]
(United States) J Boserup (United States) N Gibbs	4	6	[12]
4	(Germany) A Lottner (Greece) D Papamichail	6	6
(United States) K Fleischman (United States) V Glozman	0	2
(United States) S Crawford (United States) A Weinhold	4	6	[10]
(United States) G Brodsky (Mexico) S León	6	1	[6]
(Netherlands) L Kerkhove (Netherlands) A Rus	7^{7}	7^{7}
2	(Brazil) PC Gonçalves (United States) S Marand	6^{5}	6^{4}

Semifinals
1	(France) S Foretz (Luxembourg) M Minella	6	7^{7}
4	(Germany) A Lottner (Greece) D Papamichail	4	6^{4}
(United States) S Crawford (United States) A Weinhold	2	1
(Netherlands) L Kerkhove (Netherlands) A Rus	6	6

Final
1	(France) S Foretz (Luxembourg) M Minella	6	4	[10]
(Netherlands) L Kerkhove (Netherlands) A Rus	4	6	[4]
