= Glozman =

Glozman is a surname. Notable people with the surname include:

- Valerie Glozman (born 2006), American professional tennis player
- Vivian Glozman, American professional pickleball player
