= 2015 Kirkland Tennis Challenger =

- Date: 5–11 October
- Edition: 1st
- Category: ITF Women's Circuit
- Prize money: $50,000
- Surface: Hard
- Location: Kirkland, Washington, United States

Champions

Singles
- (Luxembourg) Mandy Minella

Doubles
- (France) Stéphanie Foretz / (Luxembourg) Mandy Minella
Kirkland Tennis Challenger	· 2016 →

The 2015 Kirkland Tennis Challenger was a professional tennis tournament played on outdoor hard courts. It was the first edition of the tournament and part of the 2015 ITF Women's Circuit, offering a total of $50,000 in prize money. It took place in Kirkland, Washington, United States, on 5–11 October 2015.

== Singles main draw entrants ==
=== Seeds ===
Country	Player	Rank^{1}	Seed
USA	Sachia Vickery	133	1
USA	Alexa Glatch	136	2
USA	Nicole Gibbs	154	3
USA	Jessica Pegula	161	4
ISR	Shahar Pe'er	164	5
FRA	Stéphanie Foretz	184	6
USA	Samantha Crawford	188	7
USA	Julia Boserup	190	8

- ^{1} Rankings as of 28 September 2015

=== Other entrants ===
The following players received wildcards into the singles main draw:

- (United States) Jacqueline Cako
- (United States) Gail Brodsky
- (United States) Ellie Halbauer
- (United States) Ashley Weinhold

The following players received entry from the qualifying draw:

- (Mexico) Sabastiani León
- (Greece) Despina Papamichail
- (United States) Sabrina Santamaria
- (Finland) Piia Suomalainen

The following player received entry by a lucky loser spot:

- (Canada) Heidi El Tabakh

== Champions ==
=== Singles ===
- (Luxembourg) Mandy Minella def. (United States) Nicole Gibbs, 2–6, 7–5, 6–2

=== Doubles ===
- (France) Stéphanie Foretz / (Luxembourg) Mandy Minella def. (Netherlands) Lesley Kerkhove / (Netherlands) Arantxa Rus, 6–4, 4–6, [10–4]
