= 2015 Kirkland Tennis Challenger – Singles =

Singles
- 2015 Kirkland Tennis Challenger

Final
- Champion: (Luxembourg) Mandy Minella
- Runner-up: (United States) Nicole Gibbs
- Score: 2–6, 7–5, 6–2

Events
Singles	Doubles
← 2014 ·	Kirkland Tennis Challenger	· 2016 →

This was a new event to the ITF Women's Circuit.

Mandy Minella won the inaugural title, defeating Nicole Gibbs in the final, 2–6, 7–5, 6–2.

== Seeds ==
1. (United States) Sachia Vickery (quarterfinals)
2. (United States) Alexa Glatch (quarterfinals)
3. (United States) Nicole Gibbs (final)
4. (United States) Jessica Pegula (quarterfinals)
5. (Israel) Shahar Pe'er (first round)
6. (France) Stéphanie Foretz (first round)
7. (United States) Samantha Crawford (second round)
8. (United States) Julia Boserup (second round)

== Main draw ==
=== Key ===
- Q = Qualifier
- WC = Wild card
- LL = Lucky loser
- Alt = Alternate
- ITF = ITF entry
- PR = Protected ranking
- SR = Special ranking
- SE = Special exempt
- JE = Junior exempt
- JR = Junior Accelerator Programme entrant
- CO = College Accelerator Programme entrant
- NG = Next Gen Accelerator Program entrant
- w/o = Walkover
- r = Retired
- d = Defaulted

=== Finals ===
Semifinals
Q	(United States) Sabrina Santamaria	3	0
3	(United States) Nicole Gibbs	6	6
(Luxembourg) Mandy Minella	6	7
(Germany) Antonia Lottner	2	5

Final
3	(United States) Nicole Gibbs	6	5	2
(Luxembourg) Mandy Minella	2	7	6

=== Top half ===
First round
1	(United States) S Vickery	6	6
WC	(United States) J Cako	2	4
LL	(Canada) H El Tabakh	4	1
WC	(United States) A Weinhold	6	6
WC	(United States) E Halbauer	2	2
(Canada) S Fichman	6	6
Q	(United States) S Santamaria	6	6
6	(France) S Foretz	4	3
3	(United States) N Gibbs	6	6
(Netherlands) A Rus	0	1
Q	(Finland) P Suomalainen	5	3
(France) S Reix	7	6
(Brazil) PC Gonçalves	3	6	0
(United States) M Oudin	6	1	6
Q	(Greece) D Papamichail	3	2
8	(United States) J Boserup	6	6

Second round
1	(United States) S Vickery	1	7	6
WC	(United States) A Weinhold	6	5	1
(Canada) S Fichman	4	6	4
Q	(United States) S Santamaria	6	0	6
3	(United States) N Gibbs	5	6	7
(France) S Reix	7	1	5
(United States) M Oudin	6	6
8	(United States) J Boserup	4	0

Quarterfinals
1	(United States) S Vickery	3	6	4
Q	(United States) S Santamaria	6	1	6
3	(United States) N Gibbs	6	6
(United States) M Oudin	2	2

Semifinals
Q	(United States) S Santamaria	3	0
3	(United States) N Gibbs	6	6

=== Bottom half ===
First round
5	(Israel) S Pe'er	1	6	4
(Serbia) J Jakšić	6	2	6
(Sweden) S Arvidsson	6	1	4
(Luxembourg) M Minella	3	6	6
(United States) D Lao	6	1
(Croatia) A Vrljić	2	0^{r}
(Netherlands) L Kerkhove	5	6^{3}
4	(United States) J Pegula	7	7^{7}
7	(United States) S Crawford	6	6
(United States) S Marand	1	2
Q	(Mexico) S León	4	3
(Germany) A Lottner	6	6
(United States) J Brady	6	5	5
(United States) T Townsend	3	7	7
WC	(United States) G Brodsky	3	2
2	(United States) A Glatch	6	6

Second round
(Serbia) J Jakšić	6	5	3
(Luxembourg) M Minella	4	7	6
(United States) D Lao	3	2
4	(United States) J Pegula	6	6
7	(United States) S Crawford	4	4
(Germany) A Lottner	6	6
(United States) T Townsend	3	2
2	(United States) A Glatch	6	6

Quarterfinals
(Luxembourg) M Minella	7	6
4	(United States) J Pegula	5	4
(Germany) A Lottner	6	6
2	(United States) A Glatch	3	2

Semifinals
(Luxembourg) M Minella	6	7
(Germany) A Lottner	2	5
