= 2022 US Open – Women's singles qualifying =

Women's singles qualifying
- 2022 US Open

Events
Singles	men	women		boys	girls
Doubles	men	women	mixed	boys	girls
WC Singles	men	women	quad
WC Doubles	men	women	quad
Legends	men	women	mixed

Qualification
Singles	men	women
← 2021 ·	US Open	· 2023 →

The 2022 US Open – Women's singles qualifying is a series of tennis matches that will take place from August 23 to 26, 2022 to determine the sixteen qualifiers into the main draw of the women's singles tournament, and, if necessary, the lucky losers.

== Seeds ==
1. (Romania) Ana Bogdan (second round)
2. (China) Zhu Lin (second round)
3. (Hungary) Panna Udvardy (first round)
4. (Czech Republic) Linda Nosková (qualified)
5. (Switzerland) Viktorija Golubic (qualified)
6. Kamilla Rakhimova (qualifying competition, lucky loser)
7. (Japan) Misaki Doi (qualifying competition)
8. (Bulgaria) Viktoriya Tomova (qualifying competition)
9. (Italy) Elisabetta Cocciaretto (qualified)
10. (Brazil) Laura Pigossi (first round)
11. (China) Wang Qiang (second round)
12. (France) Chloé Paquet (qualifying competition)
13. (United States) Katie Volynets (first round)
14. (France) Kristina Mladenovic (first round)
15. (Serbia) Olga Danilović (first round)
16. (Italy) Sara Errani (first round)
17. (Spain) Cristina Bucșa (qualified)
18. (South Korea) Jang Su-jeong (first round)
19. Vitalia Diatchenko (second round)
20. (Austria) Julia Grabher (first round)
21. (Switzerland) Simona Waltert (second round)
22. (Ukraine) Daria Snigur (qualified)
23. (Romania) Irina Bara (first round)
24. (Sweden) Mirjam Björklund (second round)
25. (United Kingdom) Katie Boulter (second round)
26. (Japan) Moyuka Uchijima (qualifying competition)
27. Erika Andreeva (qualified)
28. (France) Clara Burel (qualified)
29. (Switzerland) Ylena In-Albon (first round)
30. (Hungary) Réka Luca Jani (second round)
31. (Australia) Maddison Inglis (qualifying competition)
32. (Ukraine) Kateryna Baindl (second round)

== Qualifiers ==
1. (Mexico) Fernanda Contreras Gómez
2. (Spain) Cristina Bucșa
3. (France) Léolia Jeanjean
4. (Czech Republic) Linda Nosková
5. (Switzerland) Viktorija Golubic
6. Erika Andreeva
7. (France) Clara Burel
8. (Slovakia) Viktória Kužmová
9. (Italy) Elisabetta Cocciaretto
10. Elina Avanesyan
11. (Ukraine) Daria Snigur
12. (Czech Republic) Linda Fruhvirtová
13. (China) Yuan Yue
14. (Czech Republic) Sára Bejlek
15. (United States) Catherine Harrison
16. (United States) Ashlyn Krueger

== Lucky loser ==
The lucky losers draw was made among the four players with the highest ranking losing in the qualifying competition: Kamilla Rakhimova, Viktoriya Tomova, Chloé Paquet, and Moyuka Uchijima. The LL order drawn was Kamilla Rakhimova.

1. Kamilla Rakhimova

== Qualifying draw ==
=== First qualifier ===
First round
1	(Romania) Ana Bogdan	3	6	6
(Germany) Anna-Lena Friedsam	6	3	2
(Spain) Andrea Lázaro García	3	6	1
(Mexico) Fernanda Contreras Gómez	6	3	6
(Israel) Lina Glushko	6	4	2
(Germany) Tamara Korpatsch	3	6	6
(Czech Republic) Jesika Malečková	4	4
32	(Ukraine) Kateryna Baindl	6	6

Second round
1	(Romania) Ana Bogdan	6	4	3
(Mexico) Fernanda Contreras Gómez	2	6	6
(Germany) Tamara Korpatsch	6^{6}	6	6
32	(Ukraine) Kateryna Baindl	7^{8}	3	3

Qualifying competition
(Mexico) Fernanda Contreras Gómez	6	6
(Germany) Tamara Korpatsch	4	3

=== Second qualifier ===
First round
2	(China) Zhu Lin	6	6
(Canada) Carol Zhao	2	4
Yuliya Hatouka	7^{7}	1	0
(United States) Sachia Vickery	6^{4}	6	6
(Argentina) María Lourdes Carlé	6	6
(Austria) Sinja Kraus	3	3
(Bulgaria) Isabella Shinikova	5	2
17	(Spain) Cristina Bucșa	7	6

Second round
2	(China) Zhu Lin	3	4
(United States) Sachia Vickery	6	6
(Argentina) María Lourdes Carlé	7^{7}	2	1
17	(Spain) Cristina Bucșa	6^{5}	6	6

Qualifying competition
(United States) Sachia Vickery	4	2
17	(Spain) Cristina Bucșa	6	6

=== Third qualifier ===
First round
3	(Hungary) Panna Udvardy	2	6	6^{10}
PR	Varvara Flink	6	2	7^{12}
(Turkey) İpek Öz	7	5	0
(France) Léolia Jeanjean	5	7	6
PR	(Spain) Georgina García Pérez	7	6
(United Kingdom) Yuriko Miyazaki	5	3
WC	(United States) Kayla Day	6	6
23	(Romania) Irina Bara	1	1

Second round
PR	Varvara Flink	3	2
(France) Léolia Jeanjean	6	6
PR	(Spain) Georgina García Pérez	6	1	6
WC	(United States) Kayla Day	4	6	4

Qualifying competition
(France) Léolia Jeanjean	6	6
PR	(Spain) Georgina García Pérez	2	0

=== Fourth qualifier ===
First round
4	(Czech Republic) Linda Nosková	6	7^{7}
(Poland) Katarzyna Kawa	1	6^{2}
PR	(Canada) Eugenie Bouchard	6	6
(Japan) Yuki Naito	3	3
WC	(United States) Katrina Scott	6	6
WC	(United States) Elvina Kalieva	3	2
Anastasia Zakharova	7	6
18	(South Korea) Jang Su-jeong	5	2

Second round
4	(Czech Republic) Linda Nosková	6	6
PR	(Canada) Eugenie Bouchard	2	3
WC	(United States) Katrina Scott	2	3
Anastasia Zakharova	6	6

Qualifying competition
4	(Czech Republic) Linda Nosková	6	7
Anastasia Zakharova	2	5

=== Fifth qualifier ===
First round
5	(Switzerland) Viktorija Golubic	6	6
(United States) Hailey Baptiste	4	4
(United States) Emina Bektas	4	2
PR	(Australia) Kimberly Birrell	6	6
(Australia) Astra Sharma	1	6	7^{12}
(France) Jessika Ponchet	6	1	6^{10}
Anastasia Gasanova	6	1	2
30	(Hungary) Réka Luca Jani	4	6	6

Second round
5	(Switzerland) Viktorija Golubic	6	2	6
PR	(Australia) Kimberly Birrell	2	6	4
(Australia) Astra Sharma	2	6	6
30	(Hungary) Réka Luca Jani	6	4	3

Qualifying competition
5	(Switzerland) Viktorija Golubic	6	6
(Australia) Astra Sharma	4	4

=== Sixth qualifier ===
First round
6	Kamilla Rakhimova	7^{7}	7
(Cyprus) Raluca Șerban	6^{1}	5
(Spain) Marina Bassols Ribera	7^{7}	7^{7}
(United Kingdom) Sonay Kartal	6^{5}	6^{5}
(France) Séléna Janicijevic	5	7^{9}	4
(Spain) Rebeka Masarova	7	6^{7}	6
(Bosnia and Herzegovina) Dea Herdželaš	6	3	5
27	Erika Andreeva	3	6	7

Second round
6	Kamilla Rakhimova	6	6
(Spain) Marina Bassols Ribera	0	2
(Spain) Rebeka Masarova	2	2
27	Erika Andreeva	6	6

Qualifying competition
6	Kamilla Rakhimova	6	3	3
27	Erika Andreeva	4	6	6

=== Seventh qualifier ===
First round
7	(Japan) Misaki Doi	6	6
(Italy) Lucrezia Stefanini	2	0
(United States) Alycia Parks	6	3	1
(Romania) Alexandra Cadanțu-Ignatik	0	6	6
(Netherlands) Arianne Hartono	6	6
(United States) Danielle Lao	0	0
(Australia) Seone Mendez	2	1^{r}
28	(France) Clara Burel	6	3

Second round
7	(Japan) Misaki Doi	6	6
(Romania) Alexandra Cadanțu-Ignatik	3	1
(Netherlands) Arianne Hartono	6	3	4
28	(France) Clara Burel	4	6	6

Qualifying competition
7	(Japan) Misaki Doi	6	4	6^{10}
28	(France) Clara Burel	2	6	7^{12}

=== Eighth qualifier ===
First round
8	(Bulgaria) Viktoriya Tomova	6	6
(Spain) Aliona Bolsova	1	2
PR	(Ukraine) Katarina Zavatska	6^{6}	4
(Switzerland) Joanne Züger	7^{8}	6
(United States) Robin Anderson	5	5
(Germany) Nastasja Schunk	7	7
(Slovakia) Viktória Kužmová	6	6
20	(Austria) Julia Grabher	3	3

Second round
8	(Bulgaria) Viktoriya Tomova	6	7^{10}
(Switzerland) Joanne Züger	3	6^{8}
(Germany) Nastasja Schunk	3	2
(Slovakia) Viktória Kužmová	6	6

Qualifying competition
8	(Bulgaria) Viktoriya Tomova	4	4
(Slovakia) Viktória Kužmová	6	6

=== Ninth qualifier ===
First round
9	(Italy) Elisabetta Cocciaretto	7^{7}	6
(Andorra) Victoria Jiménez Kasintseva	6^{5}	4
(United States) Caty McNally	6	6
(United Kingdom) Jodie Burrage	3	4
Anastasia Tikhonova	3	6^{5}
WC	(United States) Whitney Osuigwe	6	7^{7}
(United States) Caroline Dolehide	3	7	3
24	(Sweden) Mirjam Björklund	6	5	6

Second round
9	(Italy) Elisabetta Cocciaretto	3	6	6
(United States) Caty McNally	6	2	3
WC	(United States) Whitney Osuigwe	6	6
24	(Sweden) Mirjam Björklund	3	4

Qualifying competition
9	(Italy) Elisabetta Cocciaretto	7^{7}	6
WC	(United States) Whitney Osuigwe	6^{4}	2

=== Tenth qualifier ===
First round
10	(Brazil) Laura Pigossi	4	4
Elina Avanesyan	6	6
(Poland) Maja Chwalińska	1	6	7
(Croatia) Tara Würth	6	1	5
WC	(United States) Christina McHale	3	1
(Belgium) Ysaline Bonaventure	6	6
(France) Elsa Jacquemot	7^{10}	6^{7}	4
26	(Japan) Moyuka Uchijima	6^{8}	7^{9}	6

Second round
Elina Avanesyan	4	6	6
(Poland) Maja Chwalińska	6	1	4
(Belgium) Ysaline Bonaventure	2	6	4
26	(Japan) Moyuka Uchijima	6	2	6

Qualifying competition
Elina Avanesyan	7	7
26	(Japan) Moyuka Uchijima	5	5

=== Eleventh qualifier ===
First round
11	(China) Wang Qiang	6	6
WC	(United States) Liv Hovde	2	1
(Japan) Nao Hibino	6	7^{7}
(United States) Louisa Chirico	3	6^{3}
PR	(Belgium) Yanina Wickmayer	6	6
PR	Anastasiya Komardina	2	2
(France) Tessah Andrianjafitrimo	6^{4}	1
22	(Ukraine) Daria Snigur	7^{7}	6

Second round
11	(China) Wang Qiang	6	3	1
(Japan) Nao Hibino	3	6	6
PR	(Belgium) Yanina Wickmayer	6	3	3
22	(Ukraine) Daria Snigur	2	6	6

Qualifying competition
(Japan) Nao Hibino	1	4
22	(Ukraine) Daria Snigur	6	6

=== Twelfth qualifier ===
First round
12	(France) Chloé Paquet	6^{4}	6	6
(Germany) Katharina Gerlach	7^{7}	4	3
Anna Blinkova	7^{7}	6
Oksana Selekhmeteva	6^{2}	3
(Switzerland) Stefanie Vögele	2	7^{7}	6^{8}
(Brazil) Carolina Alves	6	6^{1}	7^{10}
(Czech Republic) Linda Fruhvirtová	6	6
29	(Switzerland) Ylena In-Albon	3	3

Second round
12	(France) Chloé Paquet	6^{3}	6	6
Anna Blinkova	7^{7}	3	1
(Brazil) Carolina Alves	0	2
(Czech Republic) Linda Fruhvirtová	6	6

Qualifying competition
12	(France) Chloé Paquet	4	6	3
(Czech Republic) Linda Fruhvirtová	6	3	6

=== Thirteenth qualifier ===
First round
13	(United States) Katie Volynets	2	6^{6}
(China) Yuan Yue	6	7^{8}
(Japan) Mai Hontama	6	6
(Greece) Despina Papamichail	2	2
WC	(United States) Valerie Glozman	6	7^{8}
(Slovenia) Dalila Jakupović	3	6^{6}
(Georgia (country)) Ekaterine Gorgodze	5	6	6^{8}
31	(Australia) Maddison Inglis	7	3	7^{10}

Second round
(China) Yuan Yue	6	7^{7}
(Japan) Mai Hontama	3	6^{4}
WC	(United States) Valerie Glozman	4	3
31	(Australia) Maddison Inglis	6	6

Qualifying competition
(China) Yuan Yue	6	6
31	(Australia) Maddison Inglis	1	0

=== Fourteenth qualifier ===
First round
14	(France) Kristina Mladenovic	4	6	4
(Czech Republic) Sára Bejlek	6	1	6
(Australia) Priscilla Hon	2	6	6
(United States) Asia Muhammad	6	3	4
(United Kingdom) Heather Watson	6	6
Marina Melnikova	1	0
(Netherlands) Suzan Lamens	1	5
19	Vitalia Diatchenko	6	7

Second round
(Czech Republic) Sára Bejlek	6	6
(Australia) Priscilla Hon	4	1
(United Kingdom) Heather Watson	6	6
19	Vitalia Diatchenko	2	3

Qualifying competition
(Czech Republic) Sára Bejlek	3	6	7
(United Kingdom) Heather Watson	6	4	5

=== Fifteenth qualifier ===
First round
15	(Serbia) Olga Danilović	6	5	3
(Australia) Lizette Cabrera	4	7	6
WC	(United States) Catherine Harrison	6	7^{8}
(Finland) Anastasia Kulikova	4	6^{6}
(Germany) Eva Lys	6	6
(Croatia) Tena Lukas	0	2
(Uzbekistan) Nigina Abduraimova	4	5
21	(Switzerland) Simona Waltert	6	7

Second round
(Australia) Lizette Cabrera	3	6^{2}
WC	(United States) Catherine Harrison	6	7^{7}
(Germany) Eva Lys	6	6
21	(Switzerland) Simona Waltert	1	1

Qualifying competition
WC	(United States) Catherine Harrison	6	6
(Germany) Eva Lys	4	4

=== Sixteenth qualifier ===
First round
16	(Italy) Sara Errani	4	6	2
(Romania) Gabriela Lee	6	3	6
(Netherlands) Lesley Pattinama Kerkhove	6	6
PR	(Austria) Barbara Haas	3	3
WC	(United States) Ashlyn Krueger	5	7	6
(Mexico) Renata Zarazúa	7	5	0
(France) Fiona Ferro	2	3
25	(United Kingdom) Katie Boulter	6	6

Second round
(Romania) Gabriela Lee	1	6	3
(Netherlands) Lesley Pattinama Kerkhove	6	3	6
WC	(United States) Ashlyn Krueger	6	6
25	(United Kingdom) Katie Boulter	3	4

Qualifying competition
(Netherlands) Lesley Pattinama Kerkhove	5	3
WC	(United States) Ashlyn Krueger	7	6
