= 2023 US Open – Women's singles qualifying =

Women's singles qualifying
- 2023 US Open

Events
Singles	men	women		boys	girls
Doubles	men	women	mixed	boys	girls
WC Singles	men	women	quad
WC Doubles	men	women	quad
Legends	men	women	mixed

Qualification
Singles	men	women
← 2022 ·	US Open	· 2024 →

The 2023 US Open – Women's singles qualifying is a series of tennis matches that will take place from August 22 to 25, 2023 to determine the sixteen qualifiers into the main draw of the women's singles tournament, and, if necessary, the lucky losers.

== Seeds ==
Seedings are based on WTA rankings as of August 21, 2023.

1. (Japan) Nao Hibino (first round)
2. Diana Shnaider (second round)
3. (Belgium) Yanina Wickmayer (qualifying competition, retired, lucky loser)
4. (Germany) Jule Niemeier (first round)
5. (Belgium) Greet Minnen (qualified)
6. (Romania) Jaqueline Cristian (first round)
7. (China) Yuan Yue (first round)
8. (Italy) Lucrezia Stefanini (second round)
9. (Slovakia) Viktória Hrunčáková (qualifying competition, lucky loser)
10. (Germany) Laura Siegemund (qualified)
11. (Serbia) Olga Danilović (first round)
12. (Ukraine) Dayana Yastremska (qualifying competition)
13. (Australia) Kimberly Birrell (qualifying competition, lucky loser)
14. (Spain) Aliona Bolsova (second round)
15. (China) Wang Yafan (qualified)
16. (Italy) Sara Errani (first round)
17. (Hungary) Dalma Gálfi (second round)
18. (France) Océane Dodin (qualifying competition)
19. (Slovenia) Tamara Zidanšek (qualifying competition)
20. (Czech Republic) Tereza Martincová (first round)
21. (Czech Republic) Brenda Fruhvirtová (first round)
22. (Spain) Nuria Párrizas Díaz (second round)
23. (Ukraine) Daria Snigur (first round)
24. (Hungary) Anna Bondár (second round)
25. (United States) Katie Volynets (qualified)
26. (United States) Emina Bektas (qualifying competition)
27. Maria Timofeeva (first round)
28. (China) Bai Zhuoxuan (first round)
29. (Brazil) Laura Pigossi (first round)
30. (Spain) Jéssica Bouzas Maneiro (first round)
31. (Switzerland) Viktorija Golubic (second round)
32. (Spain) Marina Bassols Ribera (qualifying competition)

== Qualifiers ==
1. (Australia) Olivia Gadecki
2. (France) Elsa Jacquemot
3. (United States) Sachia Vickery
4. Vera Zvonareva
5. (Belgium) Greet Minnen
6. Tatiana Prozorova
7. (Germany) Eva Lys
8. (South Korea) Han Na-lae
9. (United Kingdom) Yuriko Miyazaki
10. (Germany) Laura Siegemund
11. (Slovenia) Kaja Juvan
12. (Romania) Elena-Gabriela Ruse
13. (United States) Fiona Crawley
14. (Sweden) Mirjam Björklund
15. (China) Wang Yafan
16. (United States) Katie Volynets

== Lucky losers ==
1. (Belgium) Yanina Wickmayer
2. (Australia) Kimberly Birrell
3. (Slovakia) Viktória Hrunčáková

== Qualifying draw ==
=== First qualifier ===
First round
1	(Japan) Nao Hibino	6^{3}	3
(United States) Louisa Chirico	7^{7}	6
(Australia) Olivia Gadecki	6	6
(France) Harmony Tan	3	1
WC	(United States) Chloe Beck	2	1
(Argentina) Julia Riera	6	6
(Mexico) Marcela Zacarías	2	1
26	(United States) Emina Bektas	6	6

Second round
(United States) Louisa Chirico	7^{7}	3	4
(Australia) Olivia Gadecki	6^{5}	6	6
(Argentina) Julia Riera	3	4
26	(United States) Emina Bektas	6	6

Qualifying competition
(Australia) Olivia Gadecki	6	6
26	(United States) Emina Bektas	1	1

=== Second qualifier ===
First round
2	Diana Shnaider	6	6
(United States) Hailey Baptiste	3	4
(France) Elsa Jacquemot	6	6
PR	(Slovakia) Jana Čepelová	2	2
(Netherlands) Arianne Hartono	6	3	6
PR	(Bulgaria) Sesil Karatantcheva	1	6	1
(Japan) Mai Hontama	7	7^{8}
28	(China) Bai Zhuoxuan	5	6^{6}

Second round
2	Diana Shnaider	7^{7}	5	3
(France) Elsa Jacquemot	6^{5}	7	6
(Netherlands) Arianne Hartono	6	6
(Japan) Mai Hontama	4	3

Qualifying competition
(France) Elsa Jacquemot	7^{7}	6
(Netherlands) Arianne Hartono	6^{3}	1

=== Third qualifier ===
First round
3	(Belgium) Yanina Wickmayer	6^{3}	7	6
(Canada) Katherine Sebov	7^{7}	5	2
(France) Chloé Paquet	6	4	1
(United Kingdom) Harriet Dart	3	6	6
(United States) Sachia Vickery	6^{8}	6	6
(Spain) Irene Burillo Escorihuela	7^{10}	3	0
WC	(United States) Mary Stoiana	3	4
31	(Switzerland) Viktorija Golubic	6	6

Second round
3	(Belgium) Yanina Wickmayer	6	6
(United Kingdom) Harriet Dart	3	4
(United States) Sachia Vickery	2	6	6
31	(Switzerland) Viktorija Golubic	6	2	2

Qualifying competition
3	(Belgium) Yanina Wickmayer	1^{r}
(United States) Sachia Vickery	3

=== Fourth qualifier ===
First round
4	(Germany) Jule Niemeier	3	4
(Greece) Despina Papamichail	6	6
PR	Vera Zvonareva	6	6
(Australia) Jaimee Fourlis	3	0
(Romania) Irina Bara	6	6
(Germany) Noma Noha Akugue	2	4
(Japan) Moyuka Uchijima	6	6
21	(Czech Republic) Brenda Fruhvirtová	1	2

Second round
(Greece) Despina Papamichail	5	5
PR	Vera Zvonareva	7	7
(Romania) Irina Bara	2	0
(Japan) Moyuka Uchijima	6	6

Qualifying competition
PR	Vera Zvonareva	7	6
(Japan) Moyuka Uchijima	5	3

=== Fifth qualifier ===
First round
5	(Belgium) Greet Minnen	6	2	6
(Turkey) Zeynep Sönmez	1	6	3
(France) Alice Robbe	6	2	2
(Austria) Sinja Kraus	4	6	6
WC	(United States) Katrina Scott	6	3
(Serbia) Natalija Stevanović	2	3^{r}
(United States) Elvina Kalieva	7^{7}	7
27	Maria Timofeeva	6^{4}	5

Second round
5	(Belgium) Greet Minnen	7	6
(Austria) Sinja Kraus	5	3
WC	(United States) Katrina Scott	7^{8}	6
(United States) Elvina Kalieva	6^{6}	2

Qualifying competition
5	(Belgium) Greet Minnen	6	4	6
WC	(United States) Katrina Scott	3	6	2

=== Sixth qualifier ===
First round
6	(Romania) Jaqueline Cristian	3	1
Iryna Shymanovich	6	6
Yuliya Hatouka	3	6	0
Tatiana Prozorova	6	1	6
(Slovakia) Rebecca Šramková	6	6
(Uzbekistan) Nigina Abduraimova	4	4
Ekaterina Makarova	1	1
19	(Slovenia) Tamara Zidanšek	6	6

Second round
Iryna Shymanovich	3	7	5
Tatiana Prozorova	6	5	7
(Slovakia) Rebecca Šramková	6	4	2
19	(Slovenia) Tamara Zidanšek	4	6	6

Qualifying competition
Tatiana Prozorova	7^{13}	3	7^{10}
19	(Slovenia) Tamara Zidanšek	6^{11}	6	6^{8}

=== Seventh qualifier ===
First round
7	(China) Yuan Yue	6	2	6^{4}
WC	(United States) McCartney Kessler	4	6	7^{10}
(South Korea) Jang Su-jeong	6	7^{7}
(Czech Republic) Lucie Havlíčková	1	6^{5}
(United States) CoCo Vandeweghe	0	2
(Germany) Eva Lys	6	6
(Cyprus) Raluca Șerban	6	5	3
22	(Spain) Nuria Párrizas Díaz	2	7	6

Second round
WC	(United States) McCartney Kessler	6	6
(South Korea) Jang Su-jeong	2	4
(Germany) Eva Lys	6	6
22	(Spain) Nuria Párrizas Díaz	3	1

Qualifying competition
WC	(United States) McCartney Kessler	2	1
(Germany) Eva Lys	6	6

=== Eighth qualifier ===
First round
8	(Italy) Lucrezia Stefanini	6	6
(Switzerland) Ylena In-Albon	2	1
(South Korea) Han Na-lae	6	6
(Andorra) Victoria Jiménez Kasintseva	3	3
(United States) Elizabeth Mandlik	6	6
PR	(France) Amandine Hesse	3	4
(Ukraine) Katarina Zavatska	6^{2}	4
24	(Hungary) Anna Bondár	7^{7}	6

Second round
8	(Italy) Lucrezia Stefanini	4	7	6^{4}
(South Korea) Han Na-lae	6	5	7^{10}
(United States) Elizabeth Mandlik	6	7^{8}
24	(Hungary) Anna Bondár	3	6^{6}

Qualifying competition
(South Korea) Han Na-lae	6	7
(United States) Elizabeth Mandlik	3	5

=== Ninth qualifier ===
First round
9	(Slovakia) Viktória Hrunčáková	6	6
(Argentina) María Lourdes Carlé	3	4
(Colombia) Emiliana Arango	4	6	7^{10}
(Turkey) İpek Öz	6	1	6^{7}
(France) Carole Monnet	3	3
Valeria Savinykh	6	6
(United Kingdom) Yuriko Miyazaki	6	6
23	(Ukraine) Daria Snigur	3	2

Second round
9	(Slovakia) Viktória Hrunčáková	4	6	7^{10}
(Colombia) Emiliana Arango	6	4	6^{8}
Valeria Savinykh	4	4
(United Kingdom) Yuriko Miyazaki	6	6

Qualifying competition
9	(Slovakia) Viktória Hrunčáková	3	6	4
(United Kingdom) Yuriko Miyazaki	6	4	6

=== Tenth qualifier ===
First round
10	(Germany) Laura Siegemund	6	6
(Italy) Nuria Brancaccio	1	4
(Germany) Mona Barthel	2	4
(Switzerland) Simona Waltert	6	6
Marina Melnikova	4	7^{7}	6
(Australia) Astra Sharma	6	6^{3}	1
(India) Karman Thandi	6	5	3
18	(France) Océane Dodin	3	7	6

Second round
10	(Germany) Laura Siegemund	6	7^{7}
(Switzerland) Simona Waltert	2	6^{4}
Marina Melnikova	6	2	3
18	(France) Océane Dodin	1	6	6

Qualifying competition
10	(Germany) Laura Siegemund	1	6	6
18	(France) Océane Dodin	6	0	3

=== Eleventh qualifier ===
First round
11	(Serbia) Olga Danilović	7	4	1
(Australia) Priscilla Hon	5	6	6
(Belgium) Marie Benoît	4	6^{0}
(Japan) Himeno Sakatsume	6	7^{7}
(Greece) Valentini Grammatikopoulou	3	3
(Japan) Haruka Kaji	6	6
(Slovenia) Kaja Juvan	7^{7}	6
29	(Brazil) Laura Pigossi	6^{4}	2

Second round
(Australia) Priscilla Hon	3	1
(Japan) Himeno Sakatsume	6	6
(Japan) Haruka Kaji	3	6	2
(Slovenia) Kaja Juvan	6	4	6

Qualifying competition
(Japan) Himeno Sakatsume	6	6^{6}	4
(Slovenia) Kaja Juvan	2	7^{8}	6

=== Twelfth qualifier ===
First round
12	(Ukraine) Dayana Yastremska	6	6
(United Kingdom) Heather Watson	3	2
(Canada) Eugenie Bouchard	6	6
WC	(United States) Katherine Hui	2	3
(France) Kristina Mladenovic	2	2
(Romania) Elena-Gabriela Ruse	6	6
(France) Jessika Ponchet	4	4
17	(Hungary) Dalma Gálfi	6	6

Second round
12	(Ukraine) Dayana Yastremska	6	4	6
(Canada) Eugenie Bouchard	1	6	4
(Romania) Elena-Gabriela Ruse	4	6	7
17	(Hungary) Dalma Gálfi	6	1	5

Qualifying competition
12	(Ukraine) Dayana Yastremska	6^{5}	3
(Romania) Elena-Gabriela Ruse	7^{7}	6

=== Thirteenth qualifier ===
First round
13	(Australia) Kimberly Birrell	6^{6}	6	6
(Spain) Leyre Romero Gormaz	7^{8}	1	2
(Latvia) Darja Semeņistaja	6	6
WC	(United States) Liv Hovde	4	2
(Hungary) Réka Luca Jani	1	7^{7}	6^{6}
WC	(United States) Fiona Crawley	6	6^{5}	7^{10}
(Hungary) Tímea Babos	1	6	6
30	(Spain) Jéssica Bouzas Maneiro	6	4	3

Second round
13	(Australia) Kimberly Birrell	6	6
(Latvia) Darja Semeņistaja	3	4
WC	(United States) Fiona Crawley	6	3	7^{10}
(Hungary) Tímea Babos	2	6	6^{5}

Qualifying competition
13	(Australia) Kimberly Birrell	3	3
WC	(United States) Fiona Crawley	6	6

=== Fourteenth qualifier ===
First round
14	(Spain) Aliona Bolsova	4	6	6
(Belgium) Magali Kempen	6	4	4
(Romania) Miriam Bulgaru	3	5
(India) Ankita Raina	6	7
WC	(United States) Makenna Jones	1	2
(Sweden) Mirjam Björklund	6	6
(France) Léolia Jeanjean	6	7
20	(Czech Republic) Tereza Martincová	3	5

Second round
14	(Spain) Aliona Bolsova	4	3
(India) Ankita Raina	6	6
(Sweden) Mirjam Björklund	6	6
(France) Léolia Jeanjean	2	4

Qualifying competition
(India) Ankita Raina	2	2
(Sweden) Mirjam Björklund	6	6

=== Fifteenth qualifier ===
First round
15	(China) Wang Yafan	6	6
(Czech Republic) Sára Bejlek	0	0
(United States) Ann Li	7^{7}	6
(Spain) Carlota Martínez Círez	6^{1}	2
WC	(United States) Valerie Glozman	4	7^{7}	6
PR	Olga Govortsova	6	6^{5}	1
(Australia) Arina Rodionova	7	6^{8}	4
32	(Spain) Marina Bassols Ribera	5	7^{10}	6

Second round
15	(China) Wang Yafan	6	6
(United States) Ann Li	2	4
WC	(United States) Valerie Glozman	7^{7}	3	1
32	(Spain) Marina Bassols Ribera	6^{2}	6	6

Qualifying competition
15	(China) Wang Yafan	6	6
32	(Spain) Marina Bassols Ribera	2	2

=== Sixteenth qualifier ===
First round
16	(Italy) Sara Errani	4	0
Erika Andreeva	6	6
(Switzerland) Jil Teichmann	3	1
(Croatia) Petra Marčinko	6	6
(Ukraine) Yulia Starodubtseva	7	4	4
(Switzerland) Céline Naef	5	6	6
(Czech Republic) Barbora Palicová	3	4
25	(United States) Katie Volynets	6	6

Second round
Erika Andreeva	6	6
(Croatia) Petra Marčinko	4	2
(Switzerland) Céline Naef	3	4
25	(United States) Katie Volynets	6	6

Qualifying competition
Erika Andreeva	1	6	2
25	(United States) Katie Volynets	6	4	6
