= Valerie Glozman =

American tennis player (born 2006)

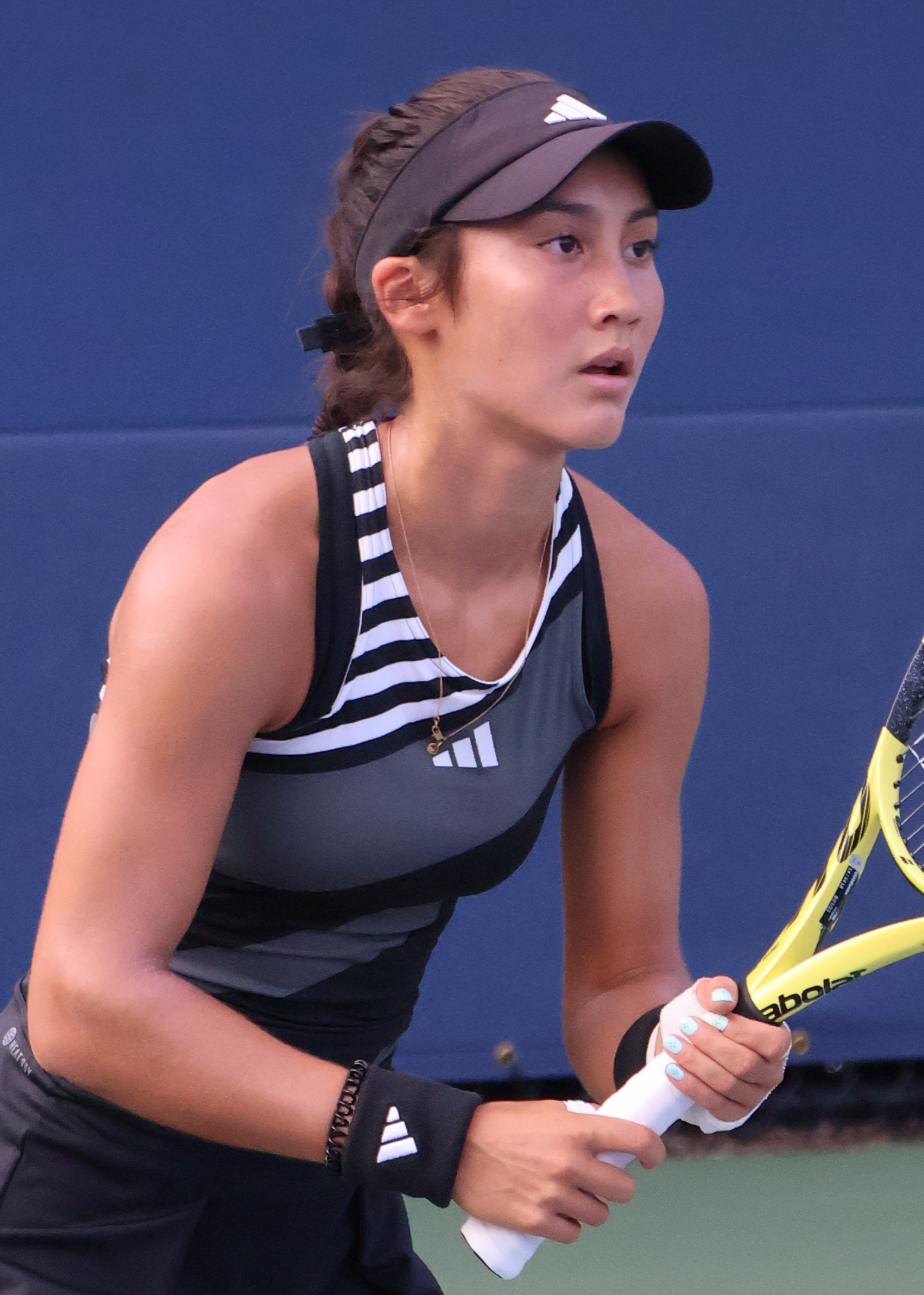
- Glozman at the 2023 US Open
- Country (sports): United States
- Born: November 22, 2006 (age 19) Bellevue, Washington
- Plays: Right-handed (two-handed both sides)
- Prize money: $225,703

Singles
- Career record: 1–1
- Career titles: 0
- Highest ranking: No. 788 (October 23, 2023)
- Current ranking: No. 941 (May 26, 2025)

Grand Slam singles results
- US Open: 1R (2025)
- Last updated on: August 24, 2023.

Valerie Glozman (born November 22, 2006) is an American tennis player. She has a career-high singles ranking of 788, achieved in October 2023. She won the U16 Easter Bowl title in Indian Wells in 2022, and the U18 Easter Bowl title in 2023, whilst 16 years old. In May 2023 she was ranked #2 in the United States for 18-year-olds. Glozman signed on to Stanford University in 2023, to play for the Stanford Cardinal. In March 2024, she won a FILA International Junior Championship.

== Junior career ==
In 2018 she won the 12U Zimmerman Johnson Tournament at Stanford University.

In 2022, she helped Team USA win the Junior Billie Jean King Cup against the Czech Republic. Competing at the USTA Girls' 18U Billie Jean King National Championships, she was a finalist in 2022 and a semifinalist in 2023. In 2022 she was also a finalist at the Girls' 18U National Indoor Championships as a 15-year-old.

Glozman won the U16 Easter Bowl title in Indian Wells in 2022. The following spring, seeded #1, she won the U18 Easter Bowl title, whilst 16 years old, becoming the first back-to-back Easter Bowl champion in nine years. She competed in the US Open Women's Qualifying in both 2022 (where she defeated former world #69 Dalila Jakupovic) and 2023.

In May 2023 she was ranked #2 in the United States for 18-year-olds. In Washington, she regularly trained with hard-hitting male tennis players because of the lack of available high level female players.

In March 2024, 17-year-old Glozman won a FILA International Junior Championship during the 2024 BNP Paribas Open, defeating second seed Iva Jovic of the US in the semifinal and top seed Teodora Kostovic of Serbia in the final, collecting her first International Tennis Federation J300 title, and a wild card into the qualifying of the 2025 BNP Paribas Open.

== Pro career ==
Glozman made her Grand Slam main draw debut at the 2025 US Open, receiving a wildcard into the main draw after winning a collegiate wildcard tournament with a win over Texas A&M's Mary Stoiana. She lost to Suzan Lamens in the first round.

== Personal life ==
From Bellevue, Washington, a suburb of Seattle, Glozman is the daughter of a Ukrainian Jewish father (Igor) and a Taiwanese mother (Ping). Her father coached her for over a decade on the public parks of Bellevue. Her sister Vivian played college tennis at the University of California and at the University of Virginia. Glozman attended Newport High School.

Glozman signed on to Stanford University in Palo Alto, California in 2023, to play for the Stanford Cardinal. At the time, she was rated as the No. 2 recruit in the country per Tennis Recruiting, and the highest-ranked recruit attending college.

== Performance timeline ==
Key
W	F	SF	QF	#R	RR	Q#	P#	DNQ	A	Z#	PO	G	S	B	NMS	NTI	P	NH

(W) winner; (F) finalist; (SF) semifinalist; (QF) quarterfinalist; (#R) rounds 4, 3, 2, 1; (RR) round-robin stage; (Q#) qualification round; (P#) preliminary round; (DNQ) did not qualify; (A) absent; (Z#) Davis/Fed Cup Zonal Group (with number indication) or (PO) play-off; (G) gold, (S) silver or (B) bronze Olympic/Paralympic medal; (NMS) not a Masters tournament; (NTI) not a Tier I tournament; (P) postponed; (NH) not held; (SR) strike rate (events won / competed); (W–L) win–loss record.
To avoid confusion and double counting, these charts are updated at the conclusion of a tournament or when the player's participation has ended.

=== Singles ===
Tournament	2023	SR	W–L	Win%
Grand Slam tournaments
Australian Open	A	0 / 0	0–0	–
French Open	A	0 / 0	0–0	–
Wimbledon	A	0 / 0	0–0	–
US Open	Q2	0 / 0	0–0	–
Win–loss	0–0	0 / 0	0–0	–
–
Career statistics
Tournaments	0	Career total: 0		
Overall win-loss	0–0	0 / 0	0–0	–
Year-end ranking		$33,600		
