= Kirkland Tennis Challenger =

ITF Women's Tour
- Event name: Kirkland Tennis Challenger
- Location: Kirkland, Washington, United States
- Venue: Central Park Tennis Club
- Category: ITF Women's Circuit
- Surface: Hard
- Draw: 32S/32Q/16D
- Prize money: $50,000
- Website: kirklandtennis.com

The Kirkland Tennis Challenger was a tournament for professional female tennis players played on outdoor hard courts. The event was classified as a $50,000 ITF Women's Circuit tournament and was held in Kirkland, Washington, United States, in 2015.

== Past finals ==
=== Singles ===
Year	Champion	Runner-up	Score
2015	(Luxembourg) Mandy Minella	(United States) Nicole Gibbs	2–6, 7–5, 6–2

=== Doubles ===
Year	Champions	Runners-up	Score
2015	(France) Stéphanie Foretz (Luxembourg) Mandy Minella	(Netherlands) Lesley Kerkhove (Netherlands) Arantxa Rus	6–4, 4–6, [10–4]
