= Mandy Minella =

Luxembourgish tennis player and politician (born 1985)

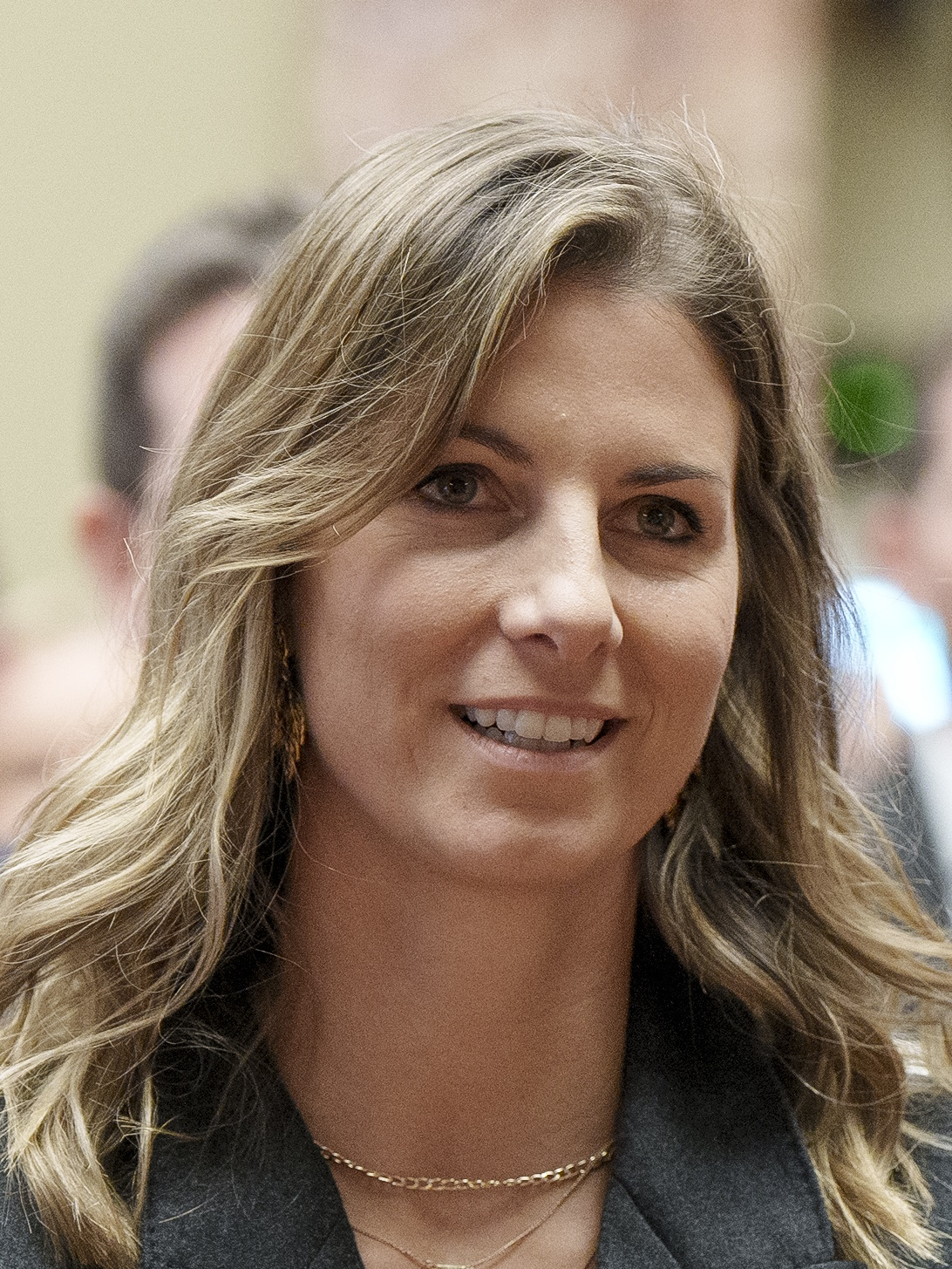
- Minella in November 2023
- Country (sports): Luxembourg
- Born: 22 November 1985 (age 40) Esch-sur-Alzette, Luxembourg
- Height: 1.80 m (5 ft 11 in)
- Turned pro: 2001
- Plays: Right-handed (two-handed backhand)
- Prize money: US$ 2,183,346

Singles
- Career record: 501–426
- Career titles: 1 WTA Challenger
- Highest ranking: No. 66 (17 September 2012)

Grand Slam singles results
- Australian Open: 2R (2014, 2017)
- French Open: 2R (2019)
- Wimbledon: 2R (2016)
- US Open: 3R (2010, 2012)

Doubles
- Career record: 187–201
- Career titles: 2 WTA, 3 WTA Challenger
- Highest ranking: No. 47 (29 April 2013)

Grand Slam doubles results
- Australian Open: 2R (2013, 2015, 2017)
- French Open: 2R (2012)
- Wimbledon: 3R (2012)
- US Open: 1R (2012, 2013, 2015)

Grand Slam mixed doubles results
- French Open: 1R (2013)

Team competitions
- Fed Cup: 32–46
Medal record
Representing Luxembourg
Games of the Small States of Europe
Gold medal – first place	2003 Malta	Doubles
Gold medal – first place	2005 Andorra	Singles
Gold medal – first place	2005 Andorra	Doubles
Gold medal – first place	2007 Monaco	Doubles
Gold medal – first place	2009 Cyprus	Singles
Gold medal – first place	2009 Cyprus	Doubles
Silver medal – second place	2003 Malta	Singles
Bronze medal – third place	2007 Monaco	Singles

Mandy Carla Minella (born 22 November 1985) is a Luxembourgish politician and former professional tennis player. Having made her debut on the WTA Tour in 2001, she peaked at No. 66 in the WTA singles rankings in September 2012 and No. 47 in doubles in April 2013.

Minella won two doubles tournaments on the WTA Tour, as well as one singles title and three doubles events of WTA 125 tournaments. She also won 16 singles and ten doubles titles on the ITF Circuit.

Minella was coached by Norbert Palmier from May 2008 until 2011, and later by Tim Sommer, her husband, from October 2014 until she retired.

After her retirement in 2022, she began a career in national politics, joining the Democratic Party and being elected to the Chamber of Deputies in 2023.

== Tennis career ==
=== Early years: 2000–2005 ===
In 2000, Minella debuted for the Luxembourg Fed Cup team, partnering Celine Francois in the doubles matches against the teams of Ukraine and Great Britain, losing both times. After again participating in Fed Cup in 2001 (where she won her first rubber), she began competing on the ITF Women's Circuit in the same year. In 2002, she received a qualifying wildcard into the WTA Tour Tier III Luxembourg Open, losing in the first round. She reached her first ITF singles final in 2003, losing to Liana-Gabriela Balaci in three sets.

She lost again in the ITF finals in 2004 (in both singles and doubles at the same tournament in Napoli), before winning her first singles title in Zadar later that year. in 2005, she won her second title, in Gardone Val Trompia.

=== ITF Circuit ===
In 2006, she won an ITF tournament in Caserta, as well as being a finalist a week later (both matches versus Alisa Kleybanova). In 2009, three years later, she won her fourth ITF title, in Tessenderlo, Belgium.

=== 2010: US Open third round ===
In 2010, Minella had more success on the ITF Circuit, winning two $25k events, in Lutz, Florida and in Stuttgart-Vaihingen, and finishing runner-up in Laguna Niguel, California.

In the qualifying draw for the US Open, Minella won all three matches and lost just one set. In her first appearance in the main draw of a Grand Slam tournament, she beat world No. 47, Polona Hercog, to advance to the second round. She continued her good performance by defeating world No. 34 and Wimbledon semifinalist, Tsvetana Pironkova. In the third round, however, she lost to world No. 4, Venus Williams.

=== 2012: Another third-round appearance at the US Open ===
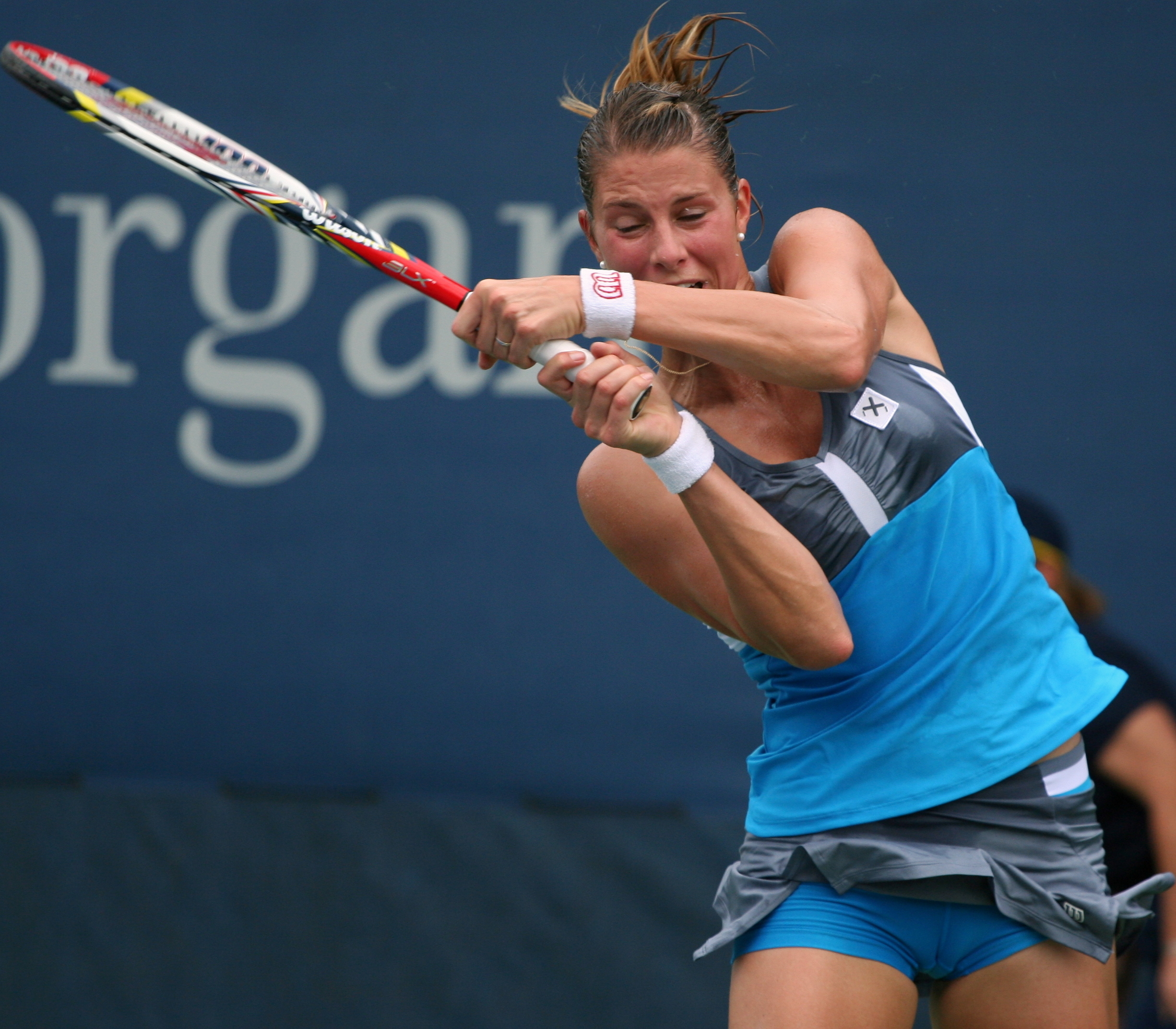
Minella at the 2012 US Open

In 2012, Minella played her first Australian Open main draw. She was given direct entry, being ranked No. 110. She lost to American qualifier Jamie Hampton in the first round. She then went on to reach the final of a $100k tournament in Cali. Despite defeating top seed Marina Erakovic along the way, she lost the final to second seed Alexandra Dulgheru. She fared better in doubles, winning the title with Karin Knapp. As a result of her performances, Minella broke into the top 100 singles rankings for the first time. She then played at the Copa Colsanitas, losing in the first round. She reached the final in doubles, her first WTA final of any kind. At the Monterrey Open, she faced Frenchwoman Mathilde Johansson and won in three sets. She followed this up with a win over wildcard Yaroslava Shvedova in a tight three-setter. Minella lost to the second seed Sara Errani in her first WTA singles quarterfinal. At the Nürnberger Gastein tournament, Minella defeated Johanna Larsson to reach her first WTA Tour semifinal (against Yanina Wickmayer). She reached the third round of Wimbledon doubles alongside Olga Govortsova, losing to Llagostera Vives and Martínez Sánchez.

=== 2013: A pair of WTA Tour doubles titles ===
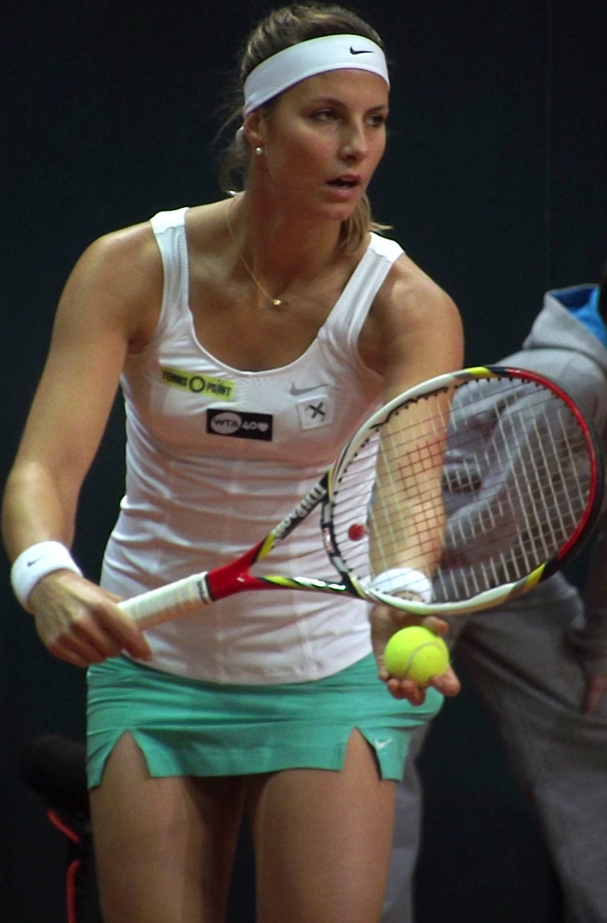
Minella at the 2013 Katowice Open

In 2013, Minella started her season at the Shenzhen Open, where she faced the first seed Li Na but lost in straight sets. She then played the Hobart International where she qualified for the main draw but lost to Monica Niculescu in the first round. In the doubles event, she partnered Tímea Babos and went on to reach the final after the pair saved multiple match points in their first-round match. They eventually lost to Garbiñe Muguruza and María Teresa Torró Flor in the final. Minella then continued her disappointing run of first-round losses, where she lost to Valeria Savinykh in the first round of the Australian Open. She partnered Megan Moulton-Levy in the doubles event and also saved multiple match points in their first-round match, eventually going on to win. The pair then lost, however, in the second round. Minella then played the Paris indoor but suffered a first-round loss in qualifying and another first-round loss in doubles. She then went to play in the Copa Colsanitas where she had more positive results, reaching the quarterfinals in singles, beating Tatjana Malek and Tímea Babos before losing to Teliana Pereira. In the doubles event, Minella again partnered Babos, going on to win her first WTA Tour title. The pair did not drop a set all week.

Minella went on to play the Mexican Open but lost to Sílvia Soler Espinosa in the first round. She then lost out to Olga Govortsova at Indian Wells in a tight three-setter. At Miami, Minella fell in qualifying to junior player Kateřina Siniaková. In the doubles event, she played with Babos once more, with the pair putting up a fight against the top seeds, Sara Errani and Roberta Vinci, in the second round, but it wasn't enough to advance. Minella then suffered another first-round loss at Charleston, to Camila Giorgi. At the Katowice Open, she defeated Vesna Dolonc in the first round before falling to the first seed Petra Kvitová. Minella then went on to play the Marrakech Grand Prix and defeated Estrella Cabeza Candela in the first round, fourth seed Kaia Kanepi in the second, and Soler Espinosa in the quarterfinals. She lost her semifinal match to Lourdes Domínguez Lino but won the doubles event with Tímea Babos.

Continuing her season playing an ITF tournament in France, Minella lost to Cabeza Candela in the quarterfinals. She played the French Open, suffering first-round losses in singles, doubles and mixed doubles. Minella then had a string of first-round losses, including at the Wimbledon Championships to the world No. 1, Serena Williams. At the US Open, she lost to Sloane Stephens in the final set tiebreak, having been up a break in the third set.

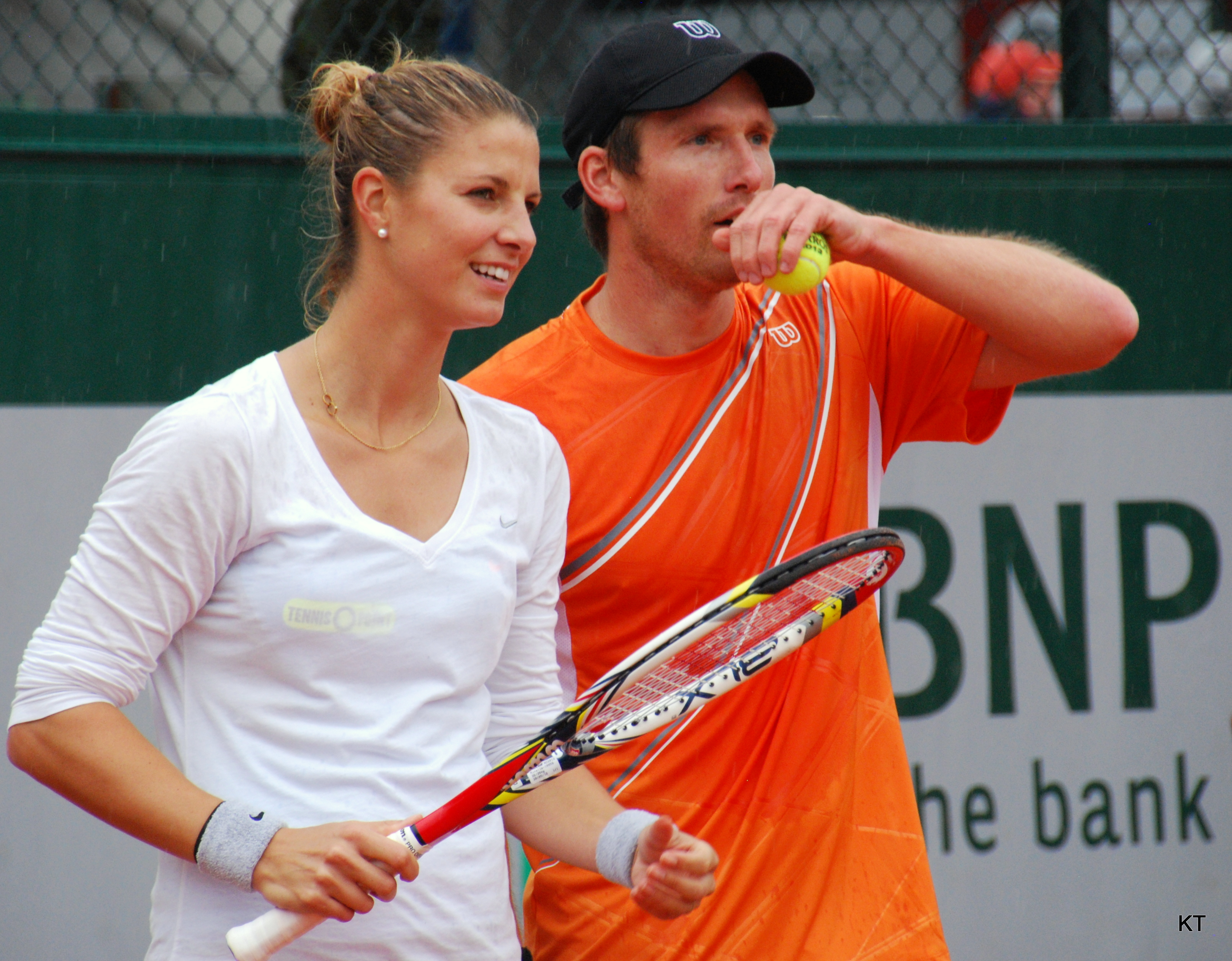
Minella and Alexander Peya in the mixed-doubles event at the 2013 French Open

Due to not being able to defend her third-round points from the 2012 US Open, Minella's rank dropped to 132. Her next tournament would be the Tashkent Open, where she reached the semifinals in singles and was runner-up, partnering Govortsova, in doubles.

Minella then suffered early losses in multiple tournaments, including losses to Estrella Cabeza Candela, Casey Dellacqua, Belinda Bencic and Caroline Wozniacki. She then went on to play at the ITF Poitiers where she defeated Donna Vekić in the first round, only to lose to eventual tournament champion, Aliaksandra Sasnovich, in the second.

Minella's last two tournaments were to be in North America. She played the Tevlin Women's Challenger defeating Élisabeth Fournier and Julia Boserup easily before falling to eventual champion, Victoria Duval, in the quarterfinals. She then went to her last tournament of the year at the South Seas Island Resort Women's Pro Classic, defeating Hsu Chieh-yu, Allie Will, Boserup and Allie Kiick to reach the final in which she played Gabriela Dabrowski, defeating her in straight sets.

In 2013, Minella won three matches 6–0, 6–0; against Kamilla Farhad, Julia Boserup and Allie Kiick.

=== 2014: Injuries and inconsistency ===
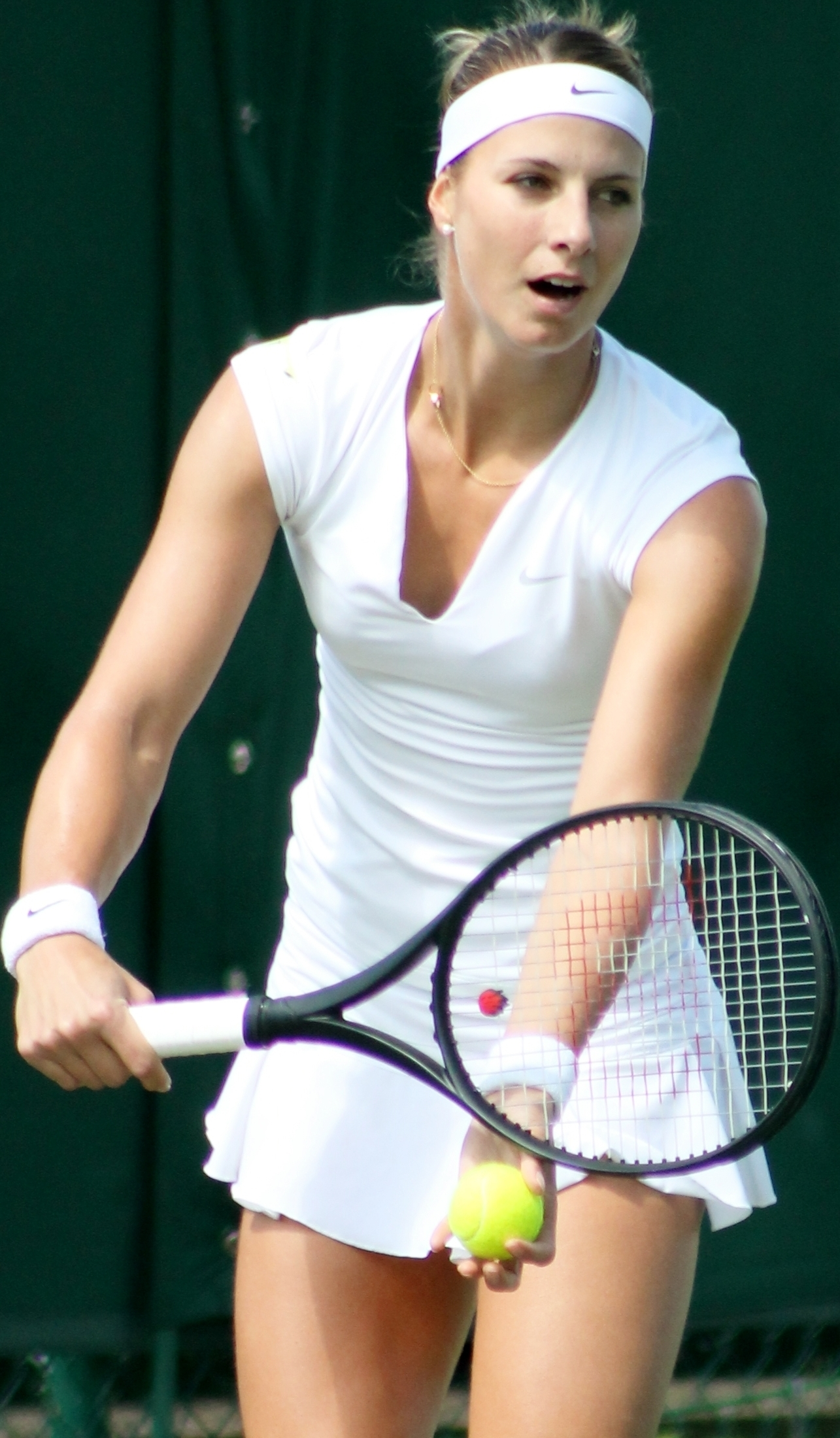
Minella at the 2014 Wimbledon

In 2014, Minella started the year at the Brisbane International where she lost to Heather Watson in the first round of qualifying, but reached the semifinals in the doubles event partnering Chanelle Scheepers. Then, at the Sydney International, Minella suffered a second successive qualifying loss at the first qualifying stage, this time at the hands of Ukrainian Lesia Tsurenko.

Minella scored her first win of the season at the Australian Open where she defeated German qualifier Carina Witthöft in straight sets, scoring her first win at a Grand Slam championship outside of the US Open, but her run was not to go further as she fell in the second round to 29th seed Anastasia Pavlyuchenkova.

Minella then was forced to withdraw from the events in Paris, Rio and Acapulco, as well as the Fed Cup due to an edema in her right arm, in which she had experienced pain whilst playing in Australia. She made her comeback at the Indian Wells Open, losing to Allie Klick in the first round of qualifying. She lost again at the first qualifying stage a fortnight later in Miami.

Minella had to take a couple of weeks off again due to the edema and hoped to be back in Marrakech for the Morocco Open, but sat out a further week before playing at the $25k Wiesbaden Open in Germany, losing in the first round of singles, but making the final in doubles with Julia Glushko. The pair lost in straight sets to Viktorija Golubic and Diāna Marcinkēviča.

Minella encountered further first-round losses at Cagnes-sur-Mer, Prague, the French Open and Marseille. She then won the $25k in Essen (Bredeney), defeating Richèl Hogenkamp in the final. Although the success on clay did not translate to success on grass as she encountered another first-round loss in qualifying at Wimbledon to Shelby Rogers. Minella then went on to have success on the ITF Circuit reaching the semifinals of a $25k event in Stuttgart, reaching the quarterfinals at the Lorraine Open 88 and the semifinals at Biarritz.

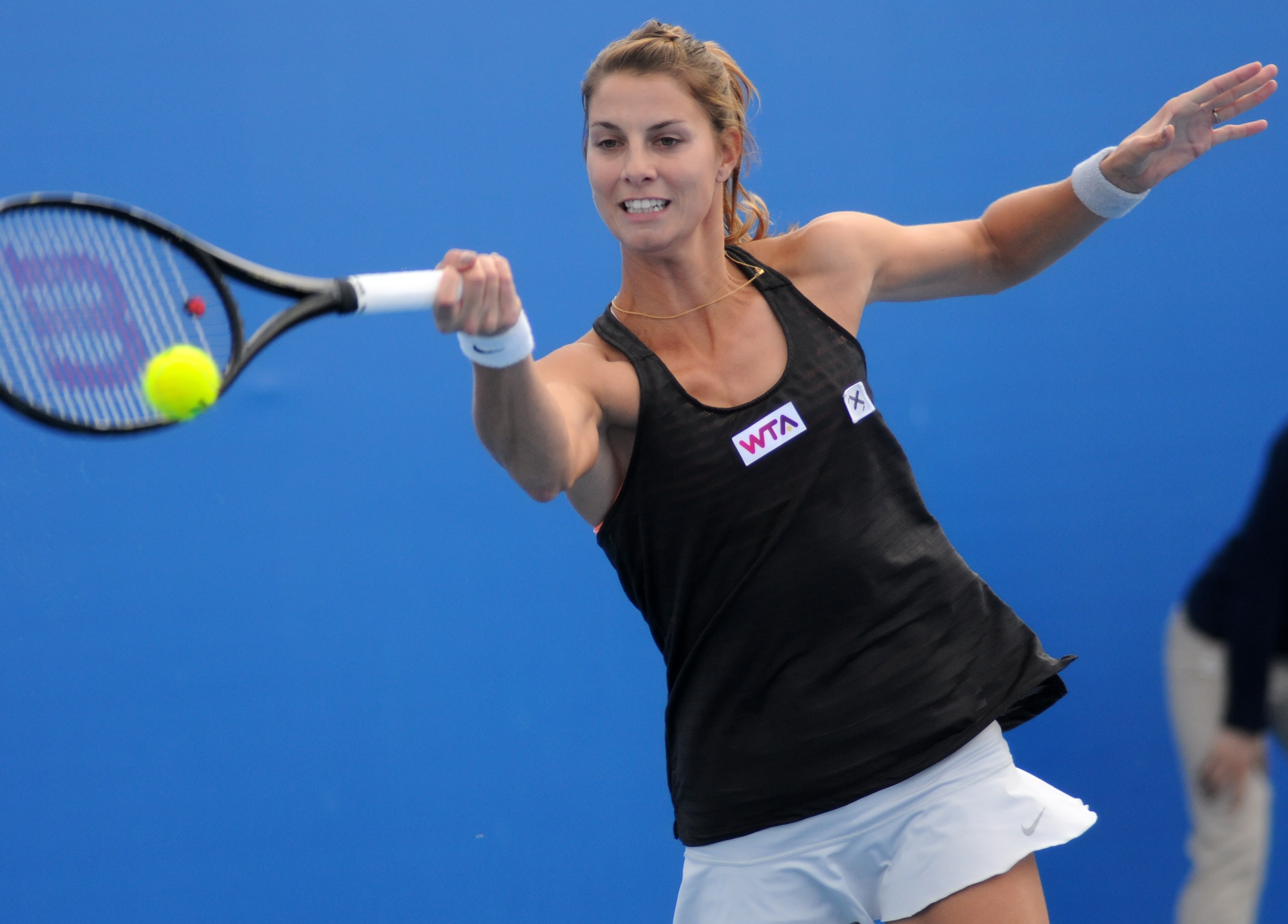
Minella at the 2014 China Open

But the success did not translate towards the WTA Tour, suffering first-round losses at the İstanbul Cup and the Jiangxi International Open. Minella then went to play the US Open, suffering a first-round loss to Kateryna Kozlova in the first qualifying round. She had been scheduled to play doubles at the US Open with Camila Giorgi, but later withdrew.

Minella started her Asian tour at the Tashkent Open where she was defending semifinal points, but she failed to do so, losing in the first round to Donna Vekić. The next stop was at Seoul, where she qualified for the main draw, defeating Choi Ji-hee, Hong Seung-yeon and Hsu Chieh-yu, all in straight sets. In the main draw, she drew Belgian Yanina Wickmayer, but lost. In the doubles event, partnering with German Mona Barthel, she reached the final, losing to Lara Arruabarrena and Irina-Camelia Begu.

Minella then continued to lose in qualifying rounds in Beijing and Linz, but also continued her success with Barthel in the doubles competitions in Wuhan, Beijing and Linz, winning a round in each. Her year ended in her home tournament in Luxembourg where she faced Barthel in the first round and lost in straight sets. Minella stated that her oedema in the right arm, which occurred in January, had still been hurting her, finishing the year in October.

=== 2015: Continued inconsistency ===
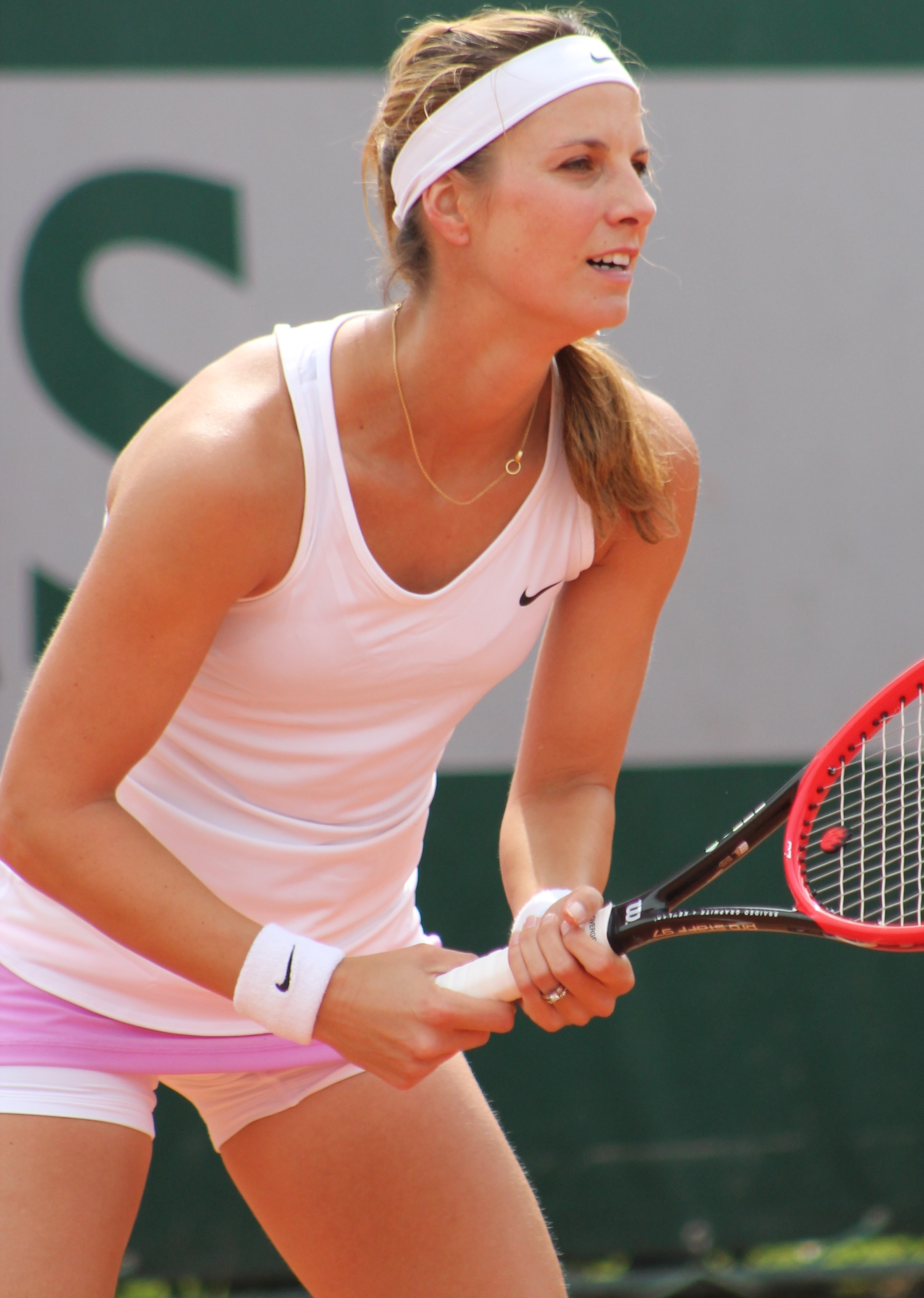
Minella at the 2015 French Open

In 2015, Minella went to Melbourne in mid-December to prepare early for the season. She started in Auckland where she won two matches in qualifying over Barbora Krejčíková and Sharon Fichman, before falling at the last hurdle to Anna Tatishvili. She also had no luck in the doubles event with Barthel, losing in the first round. Minella then headed to the Australian Open, but lost in the first qualifying round to Paula Ormaechea. She fared better in the doubles event with Barthel, and they reached the second round. Minella then went on to reach the quarterfinals at the Burnie International, falling to eventual champion Daria Gavrilova. In her next tournaments, she suffered early losses in the qualifying of WTA events and in the main draws of ITF events.

At the Bolívar Open, Minella won the doubles title partnering Lourdes Domínguez Lino, defeating Mariana Duque and Julia Glushko in the final. She qualified for the Colombia Open where she defeated Patricia Mayr-Achleitner in the first round before losing to Teliana Pereira. She continued her poor form in singles, where she had a string of early losses in WTA and ITF draws as well as the mistake of forgetting to enter the French Open singles qualifying tournament. She, however, contested the doubles competition of the French Open, partnering Barthel, but they lost in the first round. At Wimbledon, Minella won her first career matches on grass, reaching the final qualifying round, defeating Amanda Carreras and Lourdes Domínguez Lino before losing to Laura Siegemund. Partnering Magda Linette, Minella qualified for the doubles competition; however, the pair lost to Tímea Babos and Kristina Mladenovic in the first round. The poor form in Minella's 2015 season did continue, losing in the second round of the Lorraine Open 88, the first round of the Swedish Open and the Brasil Tennis Cup and in qualifying stages of the Vancouver Open.

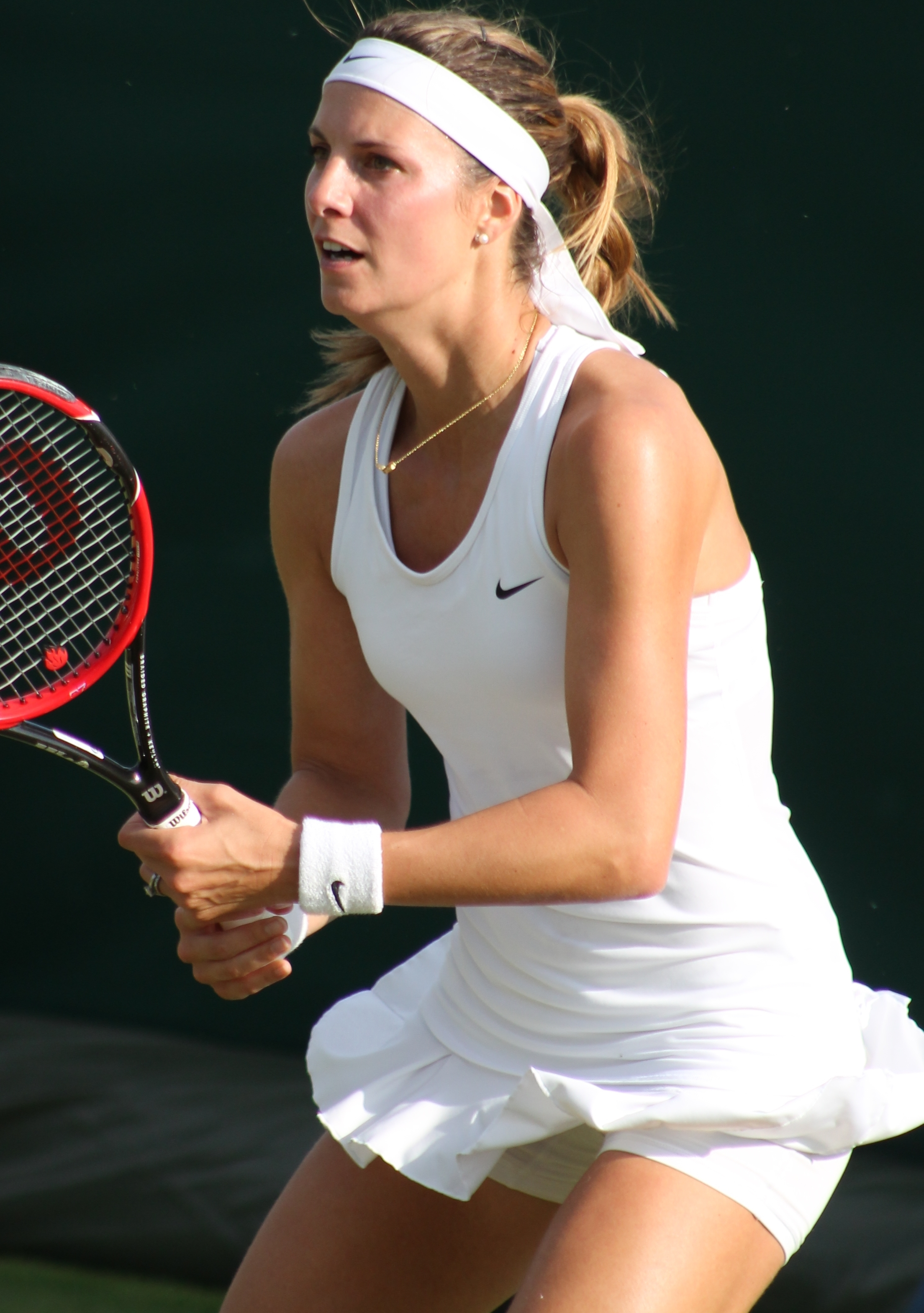
Minella at the 2015 Wimbledon qualifying

It was the latter part of the year when Minella began to turn around, qualifying for the Tournoi de Québec, reaching the doubles final of the Internacional Femenil Monterrey and the quarterfinals of the Red Rock Pro Open. It was not until the Kirkland Challenger that Minella gained her confidence. She won the singles and doubles titles of the Challenger, defeating players such as Sofia Arvidsson, Jovana Jakšić, Antonia Lottner, Jessica Pegula and Nicole Gibbs. In her second-round match against Jakšić, Minella was down 4–6, 0–5, and won the match 4–6, 7–5, 6–3, saving three match points. This was her second $50k title, her biggest to date. Next tournament was the Luxembourg Open, where she received a main-draw wildcard into the singles event; however, she had no luck in her draw once again, losing to former world No. 1, Jelena Janković, in the first round. She had more success in the doubles competition, where she partnered Julie Coin, reaching the quarterfinals. Her last tournament of the season was to be the Open de Limoges. Despite losing in qualifying to Anna Blinkova, Minella entered the main draw as a lucky loser following Lesia Tsurenko's withdrawal. In the first round, she managed to defeat Stefanie Vögele. However, she then fell to former Roland Garros champion, Francesca Schiavone, in straight sets. But Minella finished the season on a high, after winning the doubles competition, partnering Barbora Krejčíková. This marked her first triumph at a WTA 125 tournament.

=== 2016 ===
In 2016, Minella started the year poorly, including a string of first-round losses in Auckland, Melbourne and Launceston. At the Taiwan Open in Kaohsiung, she managed to score another WTA main-draw win, defeating Naomi Osaka in the first round before falling to local favourite Hsieh Su-wei. However, Minella bowed out in the first or second round of her next four events which included both ITF and WTA tournaments. In Fed Cup, she began to turn the tide, boasting an unbeaten record in Europe/Africa Zone Group III, helping Luxembourg gain promotion to Group II in 2017 alongside teammates Claudine Schaul, Eléonora Molinaro and Merima Mujasevic.

Minella began her 2016 clay-court campaign at the Prague Open. However, she lost to Océane Dodin in the second qualifying round. A few more early losses in Cagnes-sur-Mer, Saint-Gaudens and Strasbourg had only given more worries as she had failed to win back-to-back singles matches, excluding Fed Cup, for the entire year. This was not to change at the French Open, though, as she lost to Klára Koukalová in the second round of qualifying. The Bol Open, however, proved to be a lucky charm for Minella as she started to turn her year around. This event saw her win her first WTA singles title, in which she boasted wins over current top and former top-100 players Evgeniya Rodina, Varvara Lepchenko, Marina Erakovic, Ana Konjuh and Polona Hercog.

=== 2018 ===
Minella reached the only WTA Tour singles final of her career at the Ladies Championship Gstaad, losing to top seed Alizé Cornet in straight sets. Ranked at world No. 104 and using her protected ranking to enter the tournament having returned to the Tour five months earlier following the birth of her daughter, she defeated Tereza Martincová, second seed Johanna Larsson, Sara Sorribes Tormo and Markéta Vondroušová en route to the championship match.

== Personal life ==
Minella was born in Esch-sur-Alzette to Mario and Anna Minella and started playing tennis at the age of five.

On 17 October 2014, Minella married her coach and boyfriend, Tim Sommer, in her hometown of Esch-sur-Alzette. In October 2017, she gave birth to a daughter, Emma Lina. On 12 December 2020, she gave birth to her second daughter, Maya.

In November 2023, she joined the Luxembourg parliament as a member of the Democratic Party, representing the South constituency.

== Grand Slam performance timelines ==
Key
W	F	SF	QF	#R	RR	Q#	DNQ	A	NH

(W) winner; (F) finalist; (SF) semifinalist; (QF) quarterfinalist; (#R) rounds 4, 3, 2, 1; (RR) round-robin stage; (Q#) qualification round; (DNQ) did not qualify; (A) absent; (NH) not held; (SR) strike rate (events won / competed); (W–L) win–loss record.
To avoid confusion and double counting, these charts are updated at the conclusion of a tournament or when the player's participation has ended.

=== Singles ===
Tournament	2007	2008	2009	2010	2011	2012	2013	2014	2015	2016	2017	2018	2019	2020	2021	2022	W–L	Win%
Australian Open	A	A	A	A	Q2	1R	1R	2R	Q1	Q1	2R	A	Q2	Q2	A	A	2–4	33%
French Open	A	A	A	Q1	Q3	1R	1R	1R	A	Q2	1R	1R	2R	A	Q2	A	1–6	14%
Wimbledon	A	A	A	Q1	Q1	1R	1R	Q1	Q3	2R	1R	A	1R	NH	Q1	Q2	1–5	17%
US Open	Q1	A	Q1	3R	Q3	3R	1R	Q1	Q2	1R	A	Q2	1R	A	Q1	A	4–5	44%
Win–loss	0–0	0–0	0–0	2–1	0–0	2–4	0–4	1–2	0–0	1–2	1–3	0–1	1–3	0–0	0–0	0–0	8–20	29%
Career statistics
Year-end ranking	401	330	241	133	117	75	115	156	162	105	134	111	144	169	268	–	$2,183,346	

=== Doubles ===
Tournament	2007	2008	2009	2010	2011	2012	2013	2014	2015	2016	2017	2018	2019	2020	2021	W–L
Australian Open	A	A	A	A	A	A	2R	1R	2R	A	2R	A	A	2R	A	4–5
French Open	A	A	A	A	A	2R	1R	A	1R	1R	1R	1R	1R	A	A	1–7
Wimbledon	A	A	A	A	A	3R	1R	Q1	1R	Q1	1R	1R	1R	NH	A	2–6
US Open	A	A	A	A	A	1R	1R	A	1R	A	A	A	A	A	1R	0–4
Win–loss	0–0	0–0	0–0	0–0	0–0	3–3	1–4	0–1	1–4	0–1	1–3	0–2	0–2	1–1	0–1	7–22
Year-end ranking	–	414	594	422	185	65	62	83	98	236	97	289	108	113	216	

== WTA Tour finals ==
=== Singles: 1 (runner-up) ===
Legend WTA 250 (0–1)	Finals by surface Clay (0–1)

Result	W–L	Date	Tournament	Tier	Surface	Opponent	Score
Loss	0–1	Jul 2018	Ladies Gstaad Open, Switzerland	International (Note: The WTA International tournaments were reclassified as WTA 250 tournaments in 2021.)	Clay	(France) Alizé Cornet	4–6, 6–7^{(6–8)}

=== Doubles: 7 (2 titles, 5 runner-ups) ===
Legend WTA 500 WTA 250 (2–5)	Finals by surface Hard (0–4) Clay (2–1)

Result	W–L	Date	Tournament	Tier	Surface	Partner	Opponents	Score
Loss	0–1	Feb 2012	Copa Colsanitas, Colombia	International	Clay	(Switzerland) Stefanie Vögele	(Czech Republic) Eva Birnerová (Russia) Alexandra Panova	2–6, 2–6
Loss	0–2	Jan 2013	Hobart International, Australia	International	Hard	(Hungary) Tímea Babos	(Spain) Garbiñe Muguruza (Spain) María Teresa Torró Flor	3–6, 6–7^{(5–7)}
Win	1–2	Feb 2013	Copa Colsanitas, Colombia	International	Clay	(Hungary) Tímea Babos	(Czech Republic) Eva Birnerová (Russia) Alexandra Panova	6–4, 6–3
Win	2–2	Apr 2013	Rabat Grand Prix, Morocco	International	Clay	(Hungary) Tímea Babos	(Croatia) Petra Martić (France) Kristina Mladenovic	6–3, 6–1
Loss	2–3	Sep 2013	Tashkent Open, Uzbekistan	International	Hard	(Belarus) Olga Govortsova	(Hungary) Tímea Babos (Kazakhstan) Yaroslava Shvedova	3–6, 3–6
Loss	2–4	Sep 2014	Korea Open, South Korea	International	Hard	(Germany) Mona Barthel	(Spain) Lara Arruabarrena (Romania) Irina-Camelia Begu	3–6, 3–6
Loss	2–5	Oct 2018	Luxembourg Open, Luxembourg	International	Hard (i)	(Belarus) Vera Lapko	(Belgium) Greet Minnen (Belgium) Alison Van Uytvanck	6–7^{(3–7)}, 2–6

== WTA 125 finals ==
=== Singles: 1 (title) ===
Result	Date	Tournament	Surface	Opponent	Score
Win	Jun 2016	Bol Open, Croatia	Clay	(Slovenia) Polona Hercog	6–2, 6–3

=== Doubles: 3 (3 titles) ===
Result	W–L	Date	Tournament	Surface	Partner	Opponents	Score
Win	1–0	Nov 2015	Open de Limoges, France	Hard (i)	(Czech Republic) Barbora Krejčíková	(Russia) Margarita Gasparyan (Georgia (country)) Oksana Kalashnikova	1–6, 7–5, [10–6]
Win	2–0	Nov 2016	Open de Limoges, France (2)	Hard (i)	(Belgium) Elise Mertens	(United Kingdom) Anna Smith (Czech Republic) Renata Voráčová	6–4, 6–4
Win	3–0	Jun 2019	Bol Open, Croatia	Clay	(Switzerland) Timea Bacsinszky	(Sweden) Cornelia Lister (Czech Republic) Renata Voráčová	0–6, 7–6^{(7–3)}, [10–4]

== ITF Circuit finals ==
=== Singles: 24 (16 titles, 8 runner-ups) ===
Legend $100,000 tournaments $75/80,000 tournaments $50,000 tournaments $25,000 tournaments $10,000 tournaments	Finals by surface Hard (5–2) Clay (11–6)

Result	W–L	Date	Tournament	Tier	Surface	Opponent	Score
Loss	0–1	Jul 2003	ITF Ancona, Italy	10,000	Clay	(Romania) Liana Balaci	6–3, 3–6, 1–6
Loss	0–2	Mar 2004	ITF Napoli, Italy	10,000	Clay	(Belgium) Kirsten Flipkens	7–5, 3–6, 1–6
Win	1–2	May 2004	ITF Zadar, Croatia	10,000	Clay	(Croatia) Matea Mezak	7–5, 5–7, 6–4
Win	2–2	Aug 2005	ITF Gardone Val Trompia, Italy	10,000	Clay	(Czech Republic) Sandra Záhlavová	6–4, 6–3
Win	3–2	May 2006	ITF Caserta, Italy	25,000	Clay	(Russia) Alisa Kleybanova	6–2, 6–4
Loss	3–3	May 2006	ITF Campobasso, Italy	25,000	Clay	(Russia) Alisa Kleybanova	6–2, 3–6, 3–6
Loss	3–4	Aug 2008	ITF Monteroni d'Arbia, Italy	25,000	Clay	(Italy) Nathalie Viérin	1–6, 6–2, 6–7^{(5)}
Win	4–4	Apr 2009	ITF Tessenderlo, Belgium	25,000	Clay (i)	(France) Youlia Fedossova	7–5, 6–3
Win	5–4	Jan 2010	ITF Lutz, United States	25,000	Clay	(United States) Jamie Hampton	6–2, 4–6, 6–2
Loss	5–5	Feb 2010	ITF Laguna Niguel, US	25,000	Hard	(France) Olivia Sanchez	3–6, 4–6
Win	6–5	Jun 2010	ITF Stuttgart, Germany	25,000	Clay	(Netherlands) Elise Tamaëla	6–4, 6–2
Win	7–5	Jul 2011	ITF Darmstadt, Germany	25,000	Clay	(Czech Republic) Karolína Plíšková	7–6^{(5)}, 6–2
Loss	7–6	Oct 2011	Kōfu International, Japan	50,000	Hard	(Chinese Taipei) Chang Kai-chen	4–6, 6–1, 4–6
Loss	7–7	Feb 2012	Copa Bionaire, Colombia	100,000	Clay	(Romania) Alexandra Dulgheru	3–6, 6–1, 3–6
Loss	7–8	Jul 2012	Open de Biarritz, France	100,000	Clay	(Switzerland) Romina Oprandi	5–7, 5–7
Win	8–8	Nov 2013	Captiva Island Classic, US	50,000	Hard	(Canada) Gabriela Dabrowski	6–3, 6–3
Win	9–8	Jun 2014	Bredeney Ladies Open, Germany	25,000	Clay	(Netherlands) Richèl Hogenkamp	6–2, 4–6, 6–3
Win	10–8	Oct 2015	Kirkland Challenger, US	50,000	Hard	(United States) Nicole Gibbs	2–6, 7–5, 6–2
Win	11–8	Sep 2016	Albuquerque Championships, US	75,000	Hard	(Paraguay) Verónica Cepede Royg	6–4, 7–5
Win	12–8	Apr 2018	ITF Pula, Italy	25,000	Clay	(Italy) Deborah Chiesa	6–3, 7–6^{(7)}
Win	13–8	Jun 2018	Bredeney Ladies Open, Germany (2)	25,000	Clay	(Netherlands) Cindy Burger	7–5, 4–6, 6–4
Win	14–8	Jun 2018	ITF Stuttgart, Germany	25,000	Clay	(Germany) Anna Zaja	6–4, 4–6, 6–1
Win	15–8	Nov 2018	ITF Pétange, Luxembourg	25,000	Hard (i)	(Belgium) Hélène Scholsen	6–2, 6–1
Win	16–8	Nov 2019	Tyler Pro Challenge, US	80,000	Hard	(United States) Alexa Glatch	6–4, 6–4

=== Doubles: 18 (10 titles, 8 runner-ups) ===
Legend $100,000 tournaments $75,000 tournaments $50/60,000 tournaments $25,000 tournaments $10,000 tournaments	Finals by surface Hard (3–4) Clay (7–4)

Result	W–L	Date	Tournament	Tier	Surface	Partner	Opponents	Score
Loss	0–1	Jul 2003	ITF Le Touquet, France	10,000	Clay	(France) Pauline Parmentier	(Madagascar) Natacha Randriantefy (France) Aurélie Védy	2–6, 2–6
Win	1–1	Mar 2004	ITF Napoli, Italy	10,000	Clay	(Belgium) Elke Clijsters	(Netherlands) Michelle Gerards (Netherlands) Marielle Hoogland	6–1, 6–0
Win	2–1	May 2004	ITF Zadar, Croatia	10,000	Clay	(Italy) Lisa Tognetti	(Slovakia) Martina Babáková (Slovakia) Michaela Michálková	w/o
Loss	2–2	Aug 2005	ITF Gardone Val Trompia, Italy	10,000	Clay	(Czech Republic) Petra Cetkovská	(Argentina) María Corbalán (Italy) Sonia Iacovacci	w/o
Loss	2–3	Oct 2005	Classic of Troy, United States	50,000	Hard	(Georgia (country)) Salome Devidze	(United States) Julie Ditty (Venezuela) Milagros Sequera	2–6, 2–6
Win	3–3	Jun 2010	ITF Stuttgart, Germany	25,000	Clay	(France) Irena Pavlovic	(Poland) Magdalena Kiszczyńska (Japan) Erika Sema	6–3, 6–4
Win	4–3	Jun 2011	ITF Cuneo, Italy	100,000	Clay	(Switzerland) Stefanie Vögele	(Czech Republic) Eva Birnerová (Russia) Vesna Dolonts	6–3, 6–2
Win	5–3	Feb 2012	ITF Cali, Colombia	100,000	Clay	(Italy) Karin Knapp	(Romania) Alexandra Cadanțu (Romania) Raluca Olaru	6–4, 6–3
Loss	5–4	Apr 2014	Wiesbaden Open, Germany	25,000	Clay	(Israel) Julia Glushko	(Switzerland) Viktorija Golubic (Latvia) Diāna Marcinkēviča	4–6, 3–6
Win	6–4	Apr 2015	Open Medellín, Colombia	50,000	Clay	(Spain) Lourdes Domínguez Lino	(Colombia) Mariana Duque (Israel) Julia Glushko	7–5, 4–6, [10–5]
Loss	6–5	Sep 2015	ITF Monterrey, Mexico	50,000	Hard	(Russia) Marina Melnikova	(Belgium) Ysaline Bonaventure (Belgium) Elise Mertens	4–6, 6–3, [9–11]
Win	7–5	Oct 2015	Kirkland Challenger, US	50,000	Hard	(France) Stéphanie Foretz	(Netherlands) Lesley Kerkhove (Netherlands) Arantxa Rus	6–4, 4–6, [10–4]
Loss	7–6	Feb 2016	Launceston International, Australia	75,000	Hard	(Ukraine) Nadiia Kichenok	(China) You Xiaodi (China) Zhu Lin	6–2, 5–7, [7–10]
Loss	7–7	Sep 2016	Albuquerque Championships, US	75,000	Hard	(Belgium) Elise Mertens	(Netherlands) Michaëlla Krajicek (United States) Maria Sanchez	2–6, 4–6
Win	8–7	Dec 2016	Dubai Tennis Challenge, UAE	100,000	Hard	(Serbia) Nina Stojanović	(Chinese Taipei) Hsieh Su-wei (Russia) Valeria Savinykh	6–3, 3–6, [10–4]
Win	9–7	Sep 2019	Montreux Ladies Open, Switzerland	60,000	Clay	(Switzerland) Xenia Knoll	(Switzerland) Ylena In-Albon (Switzerland) Conny Perrin	6–3, 6–4
Win	10–7	Nov 2019	Las Vegas Open, US	60,000	Hard	(Belarus) Olga Govortsova	(United States) Sophie Chang (United States) Alexandra Mueller	6–3, 6–4
Loss	10–8	May 2021	ITF La Bisbal d'Empordà, Spain	60,000	Clay	(Germany) Mona Barthel	(Russia) Valentina Ivakhnenko (Romania) Andreea Prisăcariu	3–6, 1–6

== Head-to-head record ==
=== Record vs. top 20 players ===
Players who have been ranked world No. 1 are in boldface. Players who have been ranked in the top 10 are in italics

- (Belarus) **Victoria Azarenka** (0–1)
- (Russia) Elena Bovina (0–1)
- (France) Alizé Cornet (0–1)
- (Greece) Eleni Daniilidou (0–2)
- (Japan) Kimiko Date-Krumm (2–0)
- (Italy) Sara Errani (0–3)
- (Belgium) Kirsten Flipkens (0–1)
- (Germany) Julia Görges (0–3)
- (Germany) Anna-Lena Grönefeld (0–1)
- (Serbia) **Jelena Janković** (0–1)
- (Estonia) Kaia Kanepi (1–1)
- (Russia) Alisa Kleybanova (1–1)
- (Czech Republic) Petra Kvitová (0–2)
- (China) Li Na (0–2)
- (Germany) Sabine Lisicki (1–0)
- (Spain) Anabel Medina Garrigues (0–1)
- (Spain) **Garbiñe Muguruza** (1–0)
- (Russia) Anastasia Pavlyuchenkova (0–1)
- (Czech Republic) **Karolína Plíšková** (2–2)
- (France) Virginie Razzano (1–1)
- (France) Aravane Rezaï (1–1)
- (Czech Republic) Lucie Šafářová (0–2)
- (Italy) Francesca Schiavone (0–1)
- (United States) Sloane Stephens (0–1)
- (Czech Republic) Barbora Strýcová (0–1)
- (Spain) Carla Suárez Navarro (1–1)
- (Thailand) Tamarine Tanasugarn (1–1)
- (Italy) Roberta Vinci (0–1)
- (United States) **Serena Williams** (0–1)
- (United States) **Venus Williams** (0–1)
- (Denmark) **Caroline Wozniacki** (0–1)
