= Vivian Glozman =

American pickleball player (born c. 2000)

- Glozman in June 2026
- Country (sports): United States
- Born: Bellevue, Washington, U.S.
- Height: 5 ft 11 in (1.80 m)
- Turned pro: 2023
- Plays: Right-handed
- College: United States Air Force Academy
- Official website: vivianglozman.com

Vivian Glozman (born c. 2000) is an American professional pickleball player and former NCAA Division I collegiate tennis player. She played collegiate NCAA Division I tennis at the University of California, Berkeley and the University of Virginia before transferring to the United States Air Force Academy, where she completed an undefeated conference season in 2022. She turned to professional pickleball shortly after, competing on the Association of Pickleball Players (APP) Tour, the PPA Tour, and in Major League Pickleball (MLP). In 2026, she continues to compete on the APP Tour while also competing in Asia.

== Early life ==
Glozman is from Bellevue, Washington, and began playing tennis at age five. She attended Newport High School in Bellevue, where she was coached by her father and competed in the KingCo conference.

== College tennis career ==
Glozman played college tennis at the University of California, Berkeley during the 2017–18 season and at the University of Virginia from 2018 to 2021. She transferred to the United States Air Force Academy for her final season of NCAA eligibility in 2021–22, and local media noted her among a group of Seattle-area natives leading the Air Force women's tennis roster that year.

At Air Force, Glozman became the first player in program history to go undefeated at No. 1 singles and doubles in Mountain West Conference play, finishing 7–0 in conference singles and 10–0 in conference doubles, and compiled a combined dual-match record of 41–1 (19–0 in singles, 22–1 in doubles) on the way to an overall season record of 55–7. She was named the team's Most Valuable Player and Outstanding Singles Player, received the 2022 Arthur Ashe Leadership & Sportsmanship Award for the Mountain Region, and was named the 2022 Intercollegiate Tennis Association (ITA) Most Improved Senior and 2022 ITA Senior Player of the Year for the Mountain Region. She was also named to the All-Mountain West Women's Tennis Team. She finished her collegiate career with a combined singles record of 58–36 and a doubles record of 54–34.

== Professional pickleball career ==
=== Early career on the APP Tour (2023) ===
Glozman began playing professional pickleball in mid-2023, several months after graduating from the Air Force Academy, after former University of California, Berkeley tennis teammate Anna Bright invited her to play in a professional event. She quickly became a regular on the APP Tour, winning six medals in her first season across women's doubles (with partner Alix Truong) and mixed doubles (with partner Rob Nunnery). She and Truong won gold in women's doubles at the APP Chicago Open, defeating Megan Fudge and Susannah Barr in the final, and took silver at the APP New Jersey Open the following week, losing the final to Simone Jardim and Allison Harris. At the APP Philadelphia Open, Glozman and Truong won bronze in women's doubles, while Glozman and Nunnery won silver in mixed doubles at the same event, losing the final to Andrei Daescu and Susannah Barr. At the APP Sunmed Atlanta Metro Open, Glozman and Truong took bronze in women's doubles and Glozman and Nunnery took bronze in mixed doubles. That same year she also began competing in Major League Pickleball, advancing from the Challenger level to the Premier level within a single season.

=== PPA Tour and Major League Pickleball (2024–2025) ===
Glozman went on to compete regularly on the PPA Tour and in Major League Pickleball, where she played for the Chicago Slice. She earned her first PPA Tour medal, a silver in women's doubles with partner Lacy Schneemann, at the Los Angeles Open in April 2024. That August, Glozman and partner Jorja Johnson won bronze in women's doubles at the PPA Bristol Open. Glozman and Schneemann went on to win the women's doubles title at the PPA Tour Australia Open in February 2025, defeating top-seeded pair Allyce Jones and Tyra Black 11–7, 11–3, 7–11, 11–9 for Glozman's first career PPA Tour title. Later that month, Glozman and Johnson won bronze in women's doubles at the PPA Mesa Cup.

=== Contract termination (2025) ===
In December 2025, the United Pickleball Association (UPA) — parent organization of the PPA Tour and MLP — terminated Glozman's contract, along with those of players James Ignatowich and Ryan Fu, after the three participated in a series of clinics and an exhibition event hosted by the Pickleball Japan Federation in Tokyo. The UPA said the players' participation violated the exclusivity clauses in their contracts, stating that "participating in competitor events is a black-and-white violation of UPA agreements." At the time, Glozman held an MLP-only contract and had not competed on the PPA Tour in ten months.

Glozman, Ignatowich, and Fu filed a formal appeal on December 12, 2025, seeking reinstatement, arguing that the Japan trip was an unpaid "grow the game" educational clinic and that "nothing in our contracts prohibited this activity. We did not compete in another league, promote a rival tour, or receive compensation of any kind." The UPA denied the appeal in January 2026, and commentators noted that fellow player Parris Todd, who attended the same event, received a fine and a two-event suspension rather than termination.

=== Continued APP Tour play and international events (2026) ===
Following the UPA termination, Glozman increased her focus on the APP Tour, where she had competed since 2023, as well as newly launched APP-affiliated international events. In March 2026, she and partner Quang Duong reached the mixed doubles final at the first leg of the Pickleball D-Joy Petrolimex Cup in Ho Chi Minh City, Vietnam, part of the APP's new international alliance; the pair defeated the No. 2 seeds, Megan Fudge and Richard Livornese, in the semifinal before finishing runner-up to top seeds Jack Munro and Sofia Sewing. Days later, she and partner Casey Diamond, seeded No. 7, won the mixed doubles title at the 2026 AARP Open in Seattle, defeating the pairing of Max Manthou and Christine Maddox in the final — her first medal on the APP Tour specifically since October 2023. The following May, Glozman partnered with Roos van Reek to reach the women's doubles final at the APP Sacramento Open, defeating the No. 2, No. 3, and No. 7 seeds en route before finishing runner-up to top seeds Sofia Sewing and Megan Fudge. The following month, Glozman partnered with van Reek again to win gold in women's doubles at the D-Joy Tour's second leg, the BIDV Cup, in Ho Chi Minh City, defeating top seeds Megan Fudge and Domenika Turkovic in the final. In early June 2026, Glozman and van Reek won the women's doubles title at the Michelob ULTRA Asia Open in Ho Chi Minh City, defeating Kaitlynn Hart and Nicola Schoeman in the final, 21–7, 21–19.

=== Career finals ===
Through the 2026 season, Glozman has reached 15 documented professional finals or podium matches, with the results below drawn from independent tournament coverage.

Result	Year	Tournament	Partner	Opponent	Score
Gold	2023	APP Chicago Open	Alix Truong	Megan Fudge; Susannah Barr	11–6, 11–9, 15–12
Silver	2023	APP Sunmed New Jersey Open	Alix Truong	Simone Jardim; Allison Harris	11–2, 11–3
Bronze	2023	APP Sunmed Atlanta Metro Open	Alix Truong	Susannah Barr; Megan Fudge	7–11, 4–11
Bronze	2023	APP Sunmed Atlanta Metro Open	Rob Nunnery	Andrei Daescu; Susannah Barr	
Bronze	2023	APP Philadelphia Open	Alix Truong	Mari Humberg; Allison Harris	10–12, 8–11
Silver	2023	APP Philadelphia Open	Rob Nunnery	Andrei Daescu; Susannah Barr	
4th place	2023	APP U.S. Indoor Championships	Alix Truong	Susannah Barr; Megan Fudge	9–15
Silver	2024	PPA Veolia Los Angeles Open	Lacy Schneemann	Anna Bright; Rachel Rohrabacher	11–5, 11–5, 11–5
Bronze	2024	PPA Bristol Open	Jorja Johnson	Judit Castillo; Ewa Radzikowska	11–8, 7–11, 11–9
Gold	2025	PPA Australia Pickleball Open	Lacy Schneemann	Allyce Jones; Tyra Black	11–7, 11–3, 7–11, 11–9
Bronze	2025	PPA Mesa Cup	Jorja Johnson	Lacy Schneemann; Meghan Dizon	11–1, 11–5
Silver	2026	D-Joy Petrolimex Cup (Leg 1)	Quang Duong	Jack Munro; Sofia Sewing	
Gold	2026	AARP Open (Seattle)	Casey Diamond	Max Manthou; Christine Maddox	11–7, 11–2
Silver	2026	APP Sacramento Open	Roos van Reek	Sofia Sewing; Megan Fudge	
Gold	2026	D-Joy Tour, Leg 2 (BIDV Cup)	Roos van Reek	Megan Fudge; Domenika Turkovic	
Gold	2026	Michelob ULTRA Asia Open	Roos van Reek	Kaitlynn Hart; Nicola Schoeman	21–7, 21–19

== Personal life ==
Glozman's sister Valerie is a professional tennis player. Their father Igor is of Ukrainian-Jewish descent, and their mother Ping is from Taiwan.
