= Lesley Pattinama Kerkhove =

Dutch tennis player

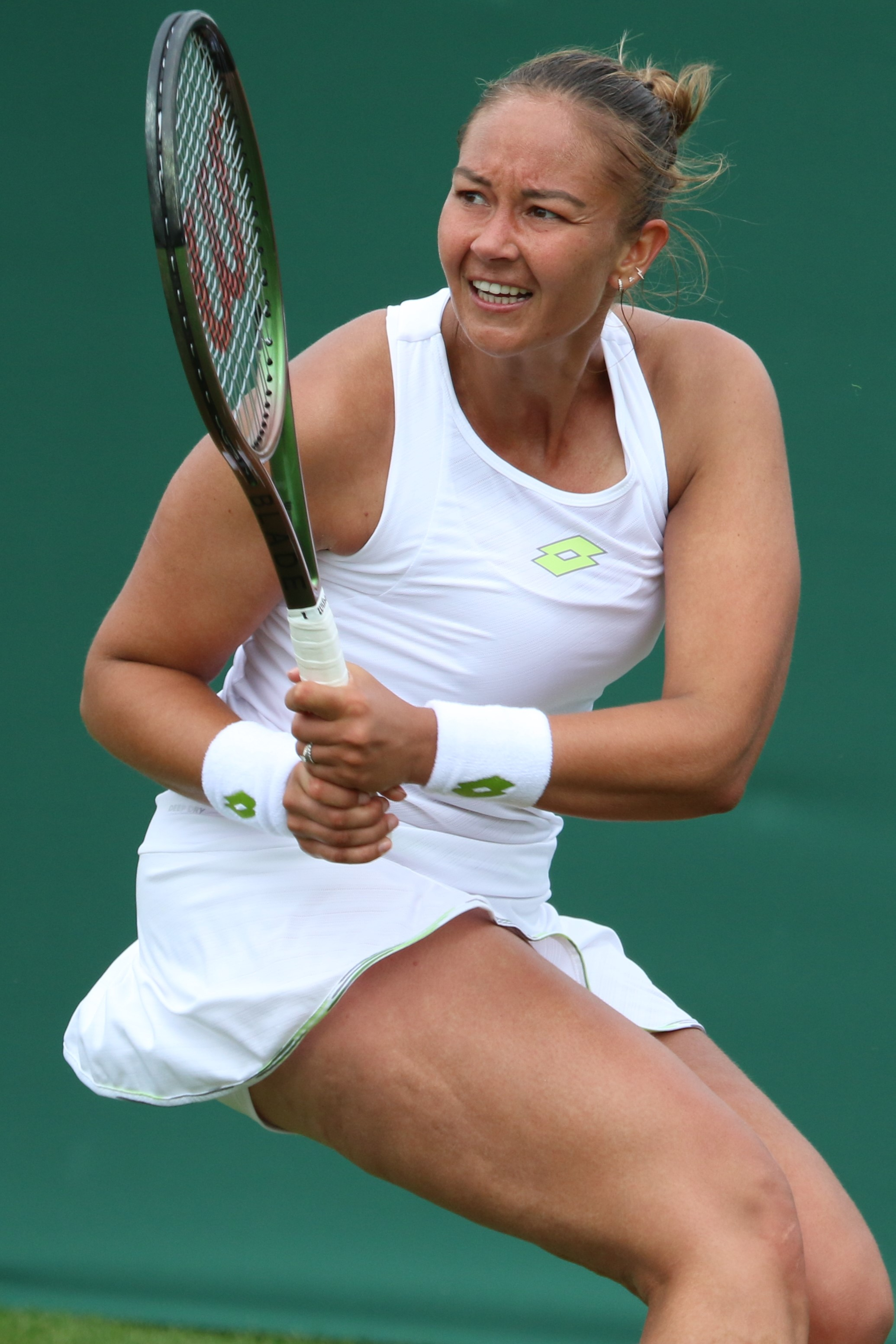
- Kerkhove at the 2023 Wimbledon Championships
- Country (sports): Netherlands
- Born: 4 November 1991 (age 35) Goes, Netherlands
- Height: 1.72 m (5 ft 8 in)
- Retired: 2024
- Plays: Right-handed
- Prize money: US$1,300,082

Singles
- Career record: 503–393
- Career titles: 10 ITF
- Highest ranking: No. 135 (6 June 2022)
- Current ranking: No. 283 (22 July 2024)

Grand Slam singles results
- Australian Open: Q3 (2018, 2024)
- French Open: Q2 (2020, 2023)
- Wimbledon: 2R (2021, 2022)
- US Open: 1R (2017)

Doubles
- Career record: 256–185
- Career titles: 1 WTA, 17 ITF
- Highest ranking: No. 58 (25 June 2018)
- Current ranking: No. 420 (22 July 2024)

Grand Slam doubles results
- Australian Open: 2R (2018)
- French Open: 1R (2018, 2020, 2021)
- Wimbledon: 2R (2017)
- US Open: 2R (2018)

Team competitions
- Fed Cup: 6–10
- Last updated on: 26 July 2024.

Lesley Pattinama Kerkhove (born 4 November 1991) is a former professional tennis player from the Netherlands.

She has won one doubles title on the WTA Tour, as well as ten singles and 17 doubles titles on the ITF Circuit. On 6 June 2022, she reached her best singles ranking of world No. 135. On 25 June 2018, she peaked at No. 58 in the doubles rankings.

== Career ==
In July 2013, Kerkhove made her WTA Tour main-draw debut at the Swedish Open.

She made her Grand Slam debut at the 2017 US Open as a qualifier, and recorded her first major singles match-win at the 2021 Wimbledon Championships over Svetlana Kuznetsova.

She recorded her second major singles win as a lucky loser at the 2022 Wimbledon Championships over wildcard Sonay Kartal, before being defeated by world No. 1, Iga Świątek, in three sets.

In July 2024, she announced her retirement from professional tour.

== Personal life ==
In July 2019, she married football player Edinho Pattinama and changed her name to Pattinama Kerkhove.

== Performance timelines ==
Key
W	F	SF	QF	#R	RR	Q#	P#	DNQ	A	Z#	PO	G	S	B	NMS	NTI	P	NH

(W) winner; (F) finalist; (SF) semifinalist; (QF) quarterfinalist; (#R) rounds 4, 3, 2, 1; (RR) round-robin stage; (Q#) qualification round; (P#) preliminary round; (DNQ) did not qualify; (A) absent; (Z#) Davis/Fed Cup Zonal Group (with number indication) or (PO) play-off; (G) gold, (S) silver or (B) bronze Olympic/Paralympic medal; (NMS) not a Masters tournament; (NTI) not a Tier I tournament; (P) postponed; (NH) not held; (SR) strike rate (events won / competed); (W–L) win–loss record.
To avoid confusion and double counting, these charts are updated at the conclusion of a tournament or when the player's participation has ended.

Only main-draw results in WTA Tour, Grand Slam tournaments, Fed Cup/Billie Jean King Cup and Olympic Games are included in win–loss records.

=== Singles ===
Current through the 2022 Wimbledon Championships.

Tournament	2013	2014	2015	2016	2017	2018	2019	2020	2021	2022	2023	SR	W–L
Grand Slam tournaments
Australian Open	A	A	A	Q2	Q1	Q3	Q1	Q2	Q2	Q1	A	0 / 0	0–0
French Open	A	A	A	Q1	Q1	A	Q1	Q2	Q1	Q1	Q2	0 / 0	0–0
Wimbledon	A	A	Q1	Q1	Q1	Q1	1R	NH	2R	2R	Q1	0 / 3	2–3
US Open	A	Q2	Q1	Q1	1R	Q2	Q1	A	Q1	Q3	A	0 / 1	0–1
Win–loss	0–0	0–0	0–0	0–0	0–1	0–0	0–1	0–0	1–1	1–1	0–0	0 / 4	2–4
WTA 1000
Dubai / Qatar Open (Note: The first Premier 5 event of the year has switched back and forth between the Dubai Tennis Championships and the Qatar Ladies Open since 2009. Dubai was classified as a Premier 5 event from 2009 to 2011 before being succeeded by Doha for the 2012–2014 period. In 2015, Dubai regained its Premier 5 status while Doha was demoted to Premier status. The Premier 5 tournaments were reclassified as WTA 1000 tournaments in 2021.)	A	A	A	A	A	A	A	A	Q2	A		0 / 0	0–0
Indian Wells Open	A	A	A	A	A	A	A	NH	Q2	Q1		0 / 0	0–0
Miami Open	A	A	A	A	A	A	A	NH	A	Q1		0 / 0	0–0
Madrid Open	A	A	A	A	A	A	A	NH	A	A		0 / 0	0–0
Italian Open	A	A	A	A	A	A	A	A	A	A		0 / 0	0–0
Canadian Open	A	A	A	A	A	A	A	NH	A	A		0 / 0	0–0
Cincinnati Open	A	A	A	A	A	A	A	A	A	A		0 / 0	0–0
Wuhan Open	A	A	A	A	A	A	Q1	NH				0 / 0	0–0
China Open	A	A	A	A	A	A	A	NH				0 / 0	0–0
Guadalajara Open	NMS/NH									A		0 / 0	0–0
Career statistics
Tournaments	1	1	0	1	5	1	3	1	5	2		Career total: 20	
Overall Win-loss	0–1	0–1	0–0	0–1	2–5	2–2	0–3	0–1	2–6	2–2		0 / 20	8–22
Year-end ranking	251	222	239	186	159	171	225	178	153	207	233	$1,165,998	

=== Doubles ===
Tournament	2017	2018	2019	2020	2021	2022	W–L
Australian Open	A	2R	A	A	A	1R	1–2
French Open	A	1R	A	1R	1R	A	0–3
Wimbledon	2R	1R	A	NH	1R	A	1–3
US Open	A	2R	A	A	1R	A	1–2
Win–loss	1–1	2–4	0–0	0–1	0–3	0–1	3–10

== WTA Tour finals ==
=== Doubles: 6 (1 title, 5 runner-ups) ===
Legend Grand Slam (–) WTA 1000 (–) WTA 500 (–) WTA 250 (1–5)	Finals by surface Hard (1–3) Clay (0–1) Grass (0–1) Carpet (0–0)

Result	W–L	Date	Tournament	Tier	Surface	Partner	Opponents	Score
Loss	0–1	Jul 2016	Swedish Open, Sweden	International (Note: The WTA International tournaments were reclassified as WTA 250 tournaments in 2021.)	Clay	(Belarus) Lidziya Marozava	(Romania) Andreea Mitu (Poland) Alicja Rosolska	3–6, 5–7
Win	1–1	Oct 2017	Luxembourg Open, Luxembourg	International	Hard (i)	(Belarus) Lidziya Marozava	(Canada) Eugenie Bouchard (Belgium) Kirsten Flipkens	6–7^{(4–7)}, 6–4, [10–6]
Loss	1–2	Jun 2019	Rosmalen Open, Netherlands	International	Grass	(Netherlands) Bibiane Schoofs	(Japan) Shuko Aoyama (Serbia) Aleksandra Krunić	5–7, 3–6
Loss	1–3	Mar 2020	Lyon Open, France	International	Hard (i)	(Netherlands) Bibiane Schoofs	(Romania) Laura Ioana Paar (Germany) Julia Wachaczyk	5–7, 4–6
Loss	1–4	Sep 2021	Portorož Open, Slovenia	WTA 250	Hard	(Serbia) Aleksandra Krunić	(Russia) Anna Kalinskaya (Slovakia) Tereza Mihalíková	6–4, 2–6, [10–12]
Loss	1–5	Oct 2021	Transylvania Open, Romania	WTA 250	Hard (i)	(Serbia) Aleksandra Krunić	(Romania) Irina Bara (Georgia (country)) Ekaterine Gorgodze	6–4, 1–6, [9–11]

== ITF Circuit finals ==
=== Singles: 28 (10 titles, 18 runner–ups) ===
Legend $40,000 tournaments $25,000 tournaments $10,000 tournaments	Finals by surface Hard (9–11) Clay (1–7)

Result	W–L	Date	Tournament	Tier	Surface	Opponent	Score
Loss	0–1	Aug 2010	ITF Middelburg, Netherlands	10,000	Clay	(Netherlands) Angelique van der Meet	1–6, 3–6
Win	1–1	Feb 2011	ITF Albufeira, Portugal	10,000	Hard	(Switzerland) Amra Sadiković	3–6, 7–5, 6–2
Loss	1–2	Jun 2011	ITF Breda, Netherlands	10,000	Clay	(Russia) Polina Vinogradova	2–6, 6–1, 2–6
Loss	1–3	Jun 2011	ITF Middelburg, Netherlands	25,000	Clay	(Netherlands) Bibiane Schoofs	6–7^{(4)}, 1–6
Loss	1–4	Aug 2011	ITF Enschede, Netherlands	10,000	Clay	(Bosnia and Herzegovina) Sandra Martinović	6–2, 4–6, 4–6
Loss	1–5	Aug 2011	ITF Apeldoorn, Netherlands	10,000	Clay	(France) Myrtille Georges	5–7, 4–6
Loss	1–6	Feb 2012	Launceston International, Australia	25,000	Hard	(Kazakhstan) Yulia Putintseva	1–6, 3–6
Loss	1–7	Aug 2012	ITF Rotterdam, Netherlands	10,000	Clay	(Georgia (country)) Ekaterine Gorgodze	6–7^{(5)}, 6–2, 4–6
Loss	1–8	Sep 2012	ITF Alphen aan den Rijn, Netherlands	25,000	Clay	(Czech Republic) Sandra Záhlavová	5–7, 6–7^{(5)}
Win	2–8	Jul 2014	ITF Aschaffenburg, Germany	25,000	Clay	(Germany) Carina Witthöft	7–5, 6–3
Loss	2–9	Oct 2014	ITF Bangkok, Thailand	25,000	Hard	(Russia) Elizaveta Kulichkova	1–6, 0–6
Win	3–9	Nov 2015	ITF Équeurdreville, France	25,000	Hard (i)	(Georgia (country)) Sofia Shapatava	7–5, 6–3
Loss	3–10	Mar 2016	ITF Irapuato, Mexico	25,000	Hard	(Canada) Françoise Abanda	2–6, 4–6
Loss	3–11	Nov 2017	GB Pro-Series Shrewsbury, UK	25,000	Hard (i)	(Germany) Anna-Lena Friedsam	4–6, 2–6
Loss	3–12	May 2018	ITF Tbilisi, Georgia	25,000	Hard	(Georgia (country)) Ekaterine Gorgodze	4–6, 4–6
Win	4–12	Sep 2018	ITF Lisbon, Portugal	25,000	Hard	(Turkey) Pemra Özgen	6–2, 7–6^{(6)}
Win	5–12	Sep 2018	ITF Clermont-Ferrand, France	25,000	Hard (i)	(France) Clara Burel	6–3, 4–6, 6–4
Loss	5–13	Mar 2019	ITF Mâcon, France	25,000	Hard (i)	(France) Myrtille Georges	3–6, 3–6
Win	6–13	Aug 2019	GB Pro-Series Foxhills, UK	25,000	Hard	(Turkey) Pemra Özgen	7–6^{(6)}, 6–2
Loss	6–14	Aug 2019	ITF Chiswick, UK	25,000	Hard	(United Kingdom) Samantha Murray	4–6, 4–6
Win	7–14	Nov 2019	ITF Hua Hin, Thailand	25,000	Hard	(Hong Kong) Eudice Chong	7–6^{(5)}, 5–7, 7–5
Win	8–14	Nov 2019	ITF Hua Hin, Thailand	25,000	Hard	(United States) Hurricane Tyra Black	6–3, 6–4
Win	9–14	July 2022	ITF Corroios-Seixal, Portugal	25,000	Hard	(Israel) Lina Glushko	6–4, 6–4
Loss	9–15	July 2022	ITF Roehampton, United Kingdom	25,000	Hard	(United States) Danielle Lao	5–7, 4–6
Loss	9–16	Mar 2023	ITF Říčany, Czech Republic	40,000	Hard (i)	(Croatia) Antonia Ružić	4–6, 1–6
Win	10–16	Aug 2023	ITF Ourense, Spain	25,000	Hard	(Portugal) Francisca Jorge	7–6^{(1)}, 6–4
Loss	10–17	Aug 2023	ITF Vigo, Spain	25,000	Hard	(Croatia) Jana Fett	7–6^{(5)}, 3–6, 1–6
Loss	10–18	Oct 2023	ITF Edmonton, Canada	25,000	Hard (i)	(Australia) Arina Rodionova	3–6, 5–7

=== Doubles: 30 (17 titles, 13 runner–ups) ===
Legend $100,000 tournaments $50/60,000 tournaments $25,000 tournaments $15,000 tournaments	Finals by surface Hard (14–7) Clay (3–6)

Result	W–L	Date	Tournament	Tier	Surface	Partner	Opponents	Score
Loss	0–1	Jul 2012	ITF Rebecq, Belgium	25,000	Clay	(Russia) Marina Melnikova	(Romania) Diana Buzean (Netherlands) Daniëlle Harmsen	4–6, 2–6
Win	1–1	Oct 2013	Taipei Challenger, Taiwan	50,000	Hard	(Netherlands) Arantxa Rus	(Chinese Taipei) Chen Yi (Thailand) Luksika Kumkhum	6–4, 2–6, [14–12]
Loss	1–2	Jun 2014	ITF Stuttgart, Germany	25,000	Clay	(Netherlands) Arantxa Rus	(Switzerland) Viktorija Golubic (Germany) Laura Siegemund	3–6, 3–6
Loss	1–3	Jul 2014	ITF Aschaffenburg, Germany	25,000	Clay	(Switzerland) Xenia Knoll	(Japan) Rika Fujiwara (Japan) Yuuki Tanaka	1–6, 4–6
Loss	1–4	Sep 2014	ITF Alphen aan den Rijn, Netherlands	25,000	Clay	(Netherlands) Richèl Hogenkamp	(Sweden) Rebecca Peterson (Netherlands) Eva Wacanno	4–6, 4–6
Win	2–4	Sep 2014	GB Pro-Series Shrewsbury, UK	25,000	Hard (i)	(Netherlands) Richèl Hogenkamp	(Germany) Nicola Geuer (Switzerland) Viktorija Golubic	2–6, 7–5, [10–8]
Loss	2–5	Oct 2014	ITF Bangkok, Thailand	25,000	Hard	(Czech Republic) Martina Borecká	(Thailand) Varatchaya Wongteanchai (Thailand) Varunya Wongteanchai	2–6, 7–5, [7–10]
Win	3–5	Nov 2014	GB Pro-Series Bath, UK	25,000	Hard (i)	(Switzerland) Xenia Knoll	(Serbia) Barbara Bonić (Turkey) Pemra Özgen	6–3, 6–1
Loss	3–6	Jan 2015	Open Andrézieux-Bouthéon, France	25,000	Hard (i)	(Croatia) Ana Vrljić	(Italy) Gioia Barbieri (Latvia) Jeļena Ostapenko	6–2, 6–7^{(4)}, [3–10]
Win	4–6	Jun 2015	ITF Zeeland, Netherlands	15,000	Clay	(Netherlands) Quirine Lemoine	(Switzerland) Conny Perrin (Ukraine) Alyona Sotnikova	6–2, 3–6, [10–3]
Win	5–6	Aug 2015	ITF Westende, Belgium	25,000	Hard	(Netherlands) Indy de Vroome	(India) Ankita Raina (Ukraine) Alyona Sotnikova	7–6^{(4)}, 6–4
Loss	5–7	Sep 2015	ITF Alphen aan den Rijn, Netherlands	25,000	Clay	(Netherlands) Arantxa Rus	(Netherlands) Quirine Lemoine (Netherlands) Eva Wacanno	6–3, 4–6, [7–10]
Loss	5–8	Oct 2015	Kirkland Challenger, United States	50,000	Hard	(Netherlands) Arantxa Rus	(France) Stéphanie Foretz (Luxembourg) Mandy Minella	4–6, 6–4, [4–10]
Win	6–8	Nov 2015	ITF Équeurdreville, France	25,000	Hard (i)	(Romania) Alexandra Cadanțu	(Ukraine) Elizaveta Ianchuk (France) Shérazad Reix	6–3, 6–4
Loss	6–9	Nov 2015	GB Pro-Series Shrewsbury, UK	25,000	Hard (i)	(Netherlands) Quirine Lemoine	(Switzerland) Xenia Knoll (Italy) Alice Matteucci	6–3, 3–6, [3–10]
Loss	6–10	Dec 2015	Ankara Cup, Turkey	50,000	Hard (i)	(Poland) Paula Kania	(Spain) María José Martínez Sánchez (Russia) Marina Melnikova	4–6, 7–5, [8–10]
Win	7–10	Jul 2016	ITF Horb, Germany	25,000	Clay	(Netherlands) Richèl Hogenkamp	(Bosnia and Herzegovina) Anita Husarić (Ukraine) Oleksandra Korashvili	6–1, 7–6^{(2)}
Win	8–10	Oct 2016	Open de Touraine, France	50,000	Hard (i)	(Serbia) Ivana Jorović	(Romania) Alexandra Cadanțu (Russia) Ekaterina Yashina	6–3, 7–5
Win	9–10	Mar 2017	Zhuhai Open, China	60,000	Hard	(Belarus) Lidziya Marozava	(Ukraine) Lyudmyla Kichenok (Ukraine) Nadiia Kichenok	6–4, 6–2
Win	10–10	Jul 2017	ITF Horb, Germany	25,000	Clay	(Netherlands) Bibiane Schoofs	(Hungary) Ágnes Bukta (Bulgaria) Isabella Shinikova	7–5, 6–3
Loss	10–11	Nov 2017	Open Nantes Atlantique, France	25,000	Clay	(Netherlands) Michaëlla Krajicek	(France) Manon Arcangioli (France) Shérazad Reix	2–6, 3–6
Loss	10–12	Dec 2017	Dubai Tennis Challenge, UAE	100,000+H	Hard	(Belarus) Lidziya Marozava	(Romania) Mihaela Buzărnescu (Russia) Alena Fomina	4–6, 3–6
Win	11–12	Mar 2018	Zhuhai Open, China	60,000	Hard	(Russia) Anna Blinkova	(Japan) Nao Hibino (Montenegro) Danka Kovinić	7–5, 6–4
Win	12–12	Feb 2019	GB Pro-Series Glasgow, UK	25,000	Hard (i)	(Germany) Anna Zaja	(United Kingdom) Freya Christie (Croatia) Jana Fett	6–3, 3–6, [10–3]
Win	13–12	Mar 2019	ITF Mâcon, France	25,000	Hard (i)	(Netherlands) Bibiane Schoofs	(Italy) Claudia Giovine (Italy) Angelica Moratelli	6–2, 6–4
Win	14–12	Mar 2019	Open de Seine-et-Marne, France	60,000	Hard (i)	(United Kingdom) Harriet Dart	(United Kingdom) Sarah Beth Grey (United Kingdom) Eden Silva	6–3, 6–2
Win	15–12	Oct 2019	ITF İstanbul, Turkey	25,000	Hard (i)	(Netherlands) Richèl Hogenkamp	(Switzerland) Susan Bandecchi (Poland) Katarzyna Piter	6–2, 2–6, [10–6]
Loss	15–13	Nov 2019	ITF Hua Hin, Thailand	25,000	Hard	(Thailand) Tamarine Tanasugarn	(Romania) Georgia Crăciun (Spain) Eva Guerrero Álvarez	2–6, 5–7
Win	16–13	Nov 2019	ITF Hua Hin, Thailand	25,000	Hard	(Thailand) Tamarine Tanasugarn	(Hong Kong) Ng Kwan-yau (China) Zheng Saisai	6–2, 7–6^{(5)}
Win	17–13	Feb 2021	ITF Potchefstroom, South Africa	25,000	Hard	(Netherlands) Bibiane Schoofs	(United Kingdom) Naomi Broady (United Kingdom) Eden Silva	4–6, 6–3, [10–6]

== Junior Grand Slam finals ==
=== Girls' doubles: 1 (runner–up) ===
Result	Year	Tournament	Surface	Partner	Opponents	Score
Loss	2008	French Open	Clay	(Netherlands) Arantxa Rus	(Slovenia) Polona Hercog (Australia) Jessica Moore	7–5, 1–6, [7–10]
