= 2022 US Open – Wheelchair girls' doubles =

Wheelchair girls' doubles
- 2022 US Open

Final
- Champion: (Brazil) Jade Lanai (United States) Maylee Phelps
- Runner-up: (United Kingdom) Ruby Bishop (United States) Lily Lautenschlager
- Score: 6–0, 6–0

Details
- Draw: 4
- Seeds: 2

Events
| Singles | men | women | | boys | girls |
| Doubles | men | women | mixed | boys | girls |
| WC Singles | men | women | quad | boys | girls |
| WC Doubles | men | women | quad | boys | girls |
- US Open

The 2022 US Open wheelchair girls' doubles tournament was part of the 2022 edition of the US Open Wheelchair Championships held at the USTA Billie Jean King National Tennis Center. This tournament was the first-ever junior wheelchair doubles competition held at the US Open and was also the first time junior wheelchair competitions were held at Grand Slam tournaments in general.

== Seeds ==
1. (Brazil) Jade Lanai / (United States) Maylee Phelps (champions)
2. (United Kingdom) Ruby Bishop / (United States) Lily Lautenschlager (final)

== Draw ==
Key

- Q = Qualifier
- WC = Wild card
- LL = Lucky loser
- Alt = Alternate
- ITF = ITF entry
- PR = Protected ranking
- SR = Special ranking
- SE = Special exempt
- JE = Junior exempt
- JR = Junior Accelerator Programme entrant
- CO = College Accelerator Programme entrant
- NG = Next Gen Accelerator Program entrant
- w/o = Walkover
- r = Retired
- d = Defaulted

=== Finals ===
Semifinals
1 | (Brazil) Jade Lanai (United States) Maylee Phelps | 6 | 7
(United Kingdom) Ellie Robertson (Japan) Yuma Takamuro | 2 | 5
(United States) Sabina Czauz (Germany) Ela Porges | 5 | 1
2 | (United Kingdom) Ruby Bishop (United States) Lily Lautenschlager | 7 | 6

Final
1 | (Brazil) Jade Lanai (United States) Maylee Phelps | 6 | 6
2 | (United Kingdom) Ruby Bishop (United States) Lily Lautenschlager | 0 | 0

== Champions ==
The Brazilian-American duo of Jade Lanai and Maylee Phelps won the title, defeating American Lily Lautenschlager and British Ruby Bishop in the final with a commanding score of 6–0, 6–0.
