= 2022 US Open – Men's singles qualifying =

Men's singles qualifying
- 2022 US Open

Events
| Singles | men | women | | boys | girls |
| Doubles | men | women | mixed | boys | girls |
| WC Singles | men | women | quad |
| WC Doubles | men | women | quad |
| Legends | men | women | mixed |

Qualification
| Singles | men | women |
| ← 2021 · | US Open | · 2023 → |

The 2022 US Open – Men's singles qualifying is a series of tennis matches that took place from August 23 to 26, 2022 to determine the sixteen qualifiers into the main draw of the men's singles tournament, and, if necessary, the lucky losers.

This was the final Grand Slam appearance of two-time major quarterfinalist Gilles Simon. He lost in the second round to Matteo Arnaldi.

== Seeds ==
1. (France) Constant Lestienne (second round)
2. (Colombia) Daniel Elahi Galán (qualified)
3. (Switzerland) Henri Laaksonen (first round)
4. (Argentina) Camilo Ugo Carabelli (first round)
5. (Peru) Juan Pablo Varillas (first round)
6. Roman Safiullin (first round)
7. (Portugal) Nuno Borges (qualified)
8. (Argentina) Facundo Bagnis (qualified)
9. (Moldova) Radu Albot (first round)
10. (Italy) Franco Agamenone (qualifying competition)
11. (France) Corentin Moutet (qualifying competition, lucky loser)
12. Pavel Kotov (qualified)
13. (Slovakia) Norbert Gombos (qualified)
14. (Ecuador) Emilio Gómez (second round)
15. (Spain) Carlos Taberner (second round)
16. (Chile) Nicolás Jarry (qualified)
17. (France) Hugo Grenier (qualifying competition, lucky loser)
18. (Lithuania) Ričardas Berankis (first round)
19. (Spain) Fernando Verdasco (qualifying competition, lucky loser)
20. (Czech Republic) Tomáš Macháč (qualified)
21. (Switzerland) Dominic Stricker (first round)
22. (Argentina) Juan Pablo Ficovich (first round)
23. (Germany) Jan-Lennard Struff (second round)
24. (United Kingdom) Ryan Peniston (first round)
25. (United Kingdom) Liam Broady (second round)
26. (Canada) Vasek Pospisil (second round)
27. (Argentina) Facundo Mena (second round)
28. (Australia) Aleksandar Vukic (first round)
29. (Sweden) Elias Ymer (first round)
30. (Argentina) Federico Delbonis (qualified)
31. (Austria) Dennis Novak (qualifying competition)
32. (China) Zhang Zhizhen (qualified)

== Qualifiers ==
1. (France) Enzo Couacaud
2. (Colombia) Daniel Elahi Galán
3. (Netherlands) Gijs Brouwer
4. (Argentina) Federico Delbonis
5. (United States) Christopher Eubanks
6. (Czech Republic) Tomáš Macháč
7. (Portugal) Nuno Borges
8. (Argentina) Facundo Bagnis
9. (China) Zhang Zhizhen
10. (Switzerland) Alexander Ritschard
11. (China) Wu Yibing
12. Pavel Kotov
13. (Slovakia) Norbert Gombos
14. (United States) Brandon Holt
15. (Germany) Maximilian Marterer
16. (Chile) Nicolás Jarry

== Lucky losers ==
The lucky losers draw was made among the four players with the highest ranking losing in the qualifying competition: Franco Agamenone, Corentin Moutet, Hugo Grenier and Fernando Verdasco. The LL order drawn was Corentin Moutet, Fernando Verdasco, Hugo Grenier and Franco Agamenone.

1. (France) Corentin Moutet
2. (Spain) Fernando Verdasco
3. (France) Hugo Grenier

== Qualifying draw ==
=== First qualifier ===
First round
1 | (France) Constant Lestienne | 6 | 6
(Italy) Andrea Vavassori | 3 | 1
(France) Geoffrey Blancaneaux | 6 | 6
WC | (United States) Oliver Crawford | 3 | 4
(France) Enzo Couacaud | 6 | 6
(Brazil) Matheus Pucinelli de Almeida | 3 | 2
PR | (United States) Bradley Klahn | 4 | 6 | 2
23 | (Germany) Jan-Lennard Struff | 6 | 4 | 6

Second round
1 | (France) Constant Lestienne | 4 | 7^{7} | 3
(France) Geoffrey Blancaneaux | 6 | 6^{4} | 6
(France) Enzo Couacaud | 4 | 7^{7} | 6
23 | (Germany) Jan-Lennard Struff | 6 | 6^{3} | 2

Qualifying competition
(France) Geoffrey Blancaneaux | 5 | 0
(France) Enzo Couacaud | 7 | 6

=== Second qualifier ===
First round
2 | (Colombia) Daniel Elahi Galán | 6 | 6
(Italy) Luciano Darderi | 3 | 2
(Australia) Max Purcell | 6 | 6
(Serbia) Nikola Milojević | 0 | 4
(United States) Michael Mmoh | 6 | 5 | 1
(France) Gilles Simon | 2 | 7 | 6
(Italy) Matteo Arnaldi | 6 | 2 | 6
24 | (United Kingdom) Ryan Peniston | 2 | 6 | 2

Second round
2 | (Colombia) Daniel Elahi Galán | 7^{8} | 6
(Australia) Max Purcell | 6^{6} | 4
(France) Gilles Simon | 1 | 6 | 4
(Italy) Matteo Arnaldi | 6 | 3 | 6

Qualifying competition
2 | (Colombia) Daniel Elahi Galán | 6 | 7^{7}
(Italy) Matteo Arnaldi | 4 | 6^{1}

=== Third qualifier ===
First round
3 | (Switzerland) Henri Laaksonen | 5 | 2
PR | (Portugal) Pedro Sousa | 7 | 6
(United Kingdom) Paul Jubb | 5 | 6 | 6
(Switzerland) Antoine Bellier | 7 | 4 | 4
(Netherlands) Gijs Brouwer | 7^{7} | 6
(Portugal) Gastão Elias | 6^{4} | 2
Alexander Shevchenko | 4 | 5
27 | (Argentina) Facundo Mena | 6 | 7

Second round
PR | (Portugal) Pedro Sousa | 6 | 1 | 5
(United Kingdom) Paul Jubb | 4 | 6 | 7
(Netherlands) Gijs Brouwer | 7 | 6
27 | (Argentina) Facundo Mena | 5 | 1

Qualifying competition
(United Kingdom) Paul Jubb | 6^{3} | 6 | 2
(Netherlands) Gijs Brouwer | 7^{7} | 3 | 6

=== Fourth qualifier ===
First round
4 | (Argentina) Camilo Ugo Carabelli | 5 | 3
(Turkey) Altuğ Çelikbilek | 7 | 6
(France) Antoine Escoffier | 6^{4} | 1
(Netherlands) Jesper de Jong | 7^{7} | 6
(United States) Ernesto Escobedo | 7 | 4 | 4
WC | (United States) Ethan Quinn | 5 | 6 | 6
(Hungary) Zsombor Piros | 6^{10} | 0
30 | (Argentina) Federico Delbonis | 7^{12} | 6

Second round
(Turkey) Altuğ Çelikbilek | 2 | 5
(Netherlands) Jesper de Jong | 6 | 7
WC | (United States) Ethan Quinn | 7 | 2 | 1
30 | (Argentina) Federico Delbonis | 5 | 6 | 6

Qualifying competition
(Netherlands) Jesper de Jong | 7^{7} | 1 | 4
30 | (Argentina) Federico Delbonis | 6^{4} | 6 | 6

=== Fifth qualifier ===
First round
5 | (Peru) Juan Pablo Varillas | 2 | 2
(France) Grégoire Barrère | 6 | 6
(Argentina) Santiago Rodríguez Taverna | 4 | 4
(United States) Christopher Eubanks | 6 | 6
(Italy) Raúl Brancaccio | 7^{7} | 6
(Germany) Dominik Koepfer | 6^{4} | 4
(Germany) Mats Moraing | 6 | 6
22 | (Argentina) Juan Pablo Ficovich | 3 | 1

Second round
(France) Grégoire Barrère | 6^{6} | 7^{7} | 6^{4}
(United States) Christopher Eubanks | 7^{8} | 6^{2} | 7^{10}
(Italy) Raúl Brancaccio | 7 | 0
(Germany) Mats Moraing | 5 | 0^{r}

Qualifying competition
(United States) Christopher Eubanks | 4 | 6 | 6
(Italy) Raúl Brancaccio | 6 | 1 | 4

=== Sixth qualifier ===
First round
6 | Roman Safiullin | 4 | 4
(Italy) Flavio Cobolli | 6 | 6
(India) Ramkumar Ramanathan | 3 | 5
WC | (United States) Bruno Kuzuhara | 6 | 7
(Austria) Gerald Melzer | 5 | 2
(Slovakia) Jozef Kovalík | 7 | 6
(Czech Republic) Zdeněk Kolář | 5 | 6 | 1
20 | (Czech Republic) Tomáš Macháč | 7 | 4 | 6

Second round
(Italy) Flavio Cobolli | 6 | 6
WC | (United States) Bruno Kuzuhara | 3 | 1
(Slovakia) Jozef Kovalík | 6^{6} | 3
20 | (Czech Republic) Tomáš Macháč | 7^{8} | 6

Qualifying competition
(Italy) Flavio Cobolli | 6^{7} | 7 | 1
20 | (Czech Republic) Tomáš Macháč | 7^{9} | 5 | 6

=== Seventh qualifier ===
First round
7 | (Portugal) Nuno Borges | 6^{4} | 7^{7} | 3
WC | (United States) Alex Rybakov | 7^{7} | 6^{4} | 0^{r}
WC | (United States) Govind Nanda | 4 | 7 | 6
(Italy) Andrea Arnaboldi | 6 | 5 | 3
(Italy) Francesco Maestrelli | 7 | 6
(France) Manuel Guinard | 5 | 4
(Germany) Daniel Masur | 7^{7} | 2 | 7^{10}
29 | (Sweden) Elias Ymer | 6^{4} | 6 | 6^{6}

Second round
7 | (Portugal) Nuno Borges | 6 | 6
WC | (United States) Govind Nanda | 4 | 4
(Italy) Francesco Maestrelli | 6 | 6
(Germany) Daniel Masur | 3 | 4

Qualifying competition
7 | (Portugal) Nuno Borges | 3 | 7^{7} | 7^{10}
(Italy) Francesco Maestrelli | 6 | 6^{4} | 6^{8}

=== Eighth qualifier ===
First round
8 | (Argentina) Facundo Bagnis | 4 | 6 | 6
(Chinese Taipei) Wu Tung-lin | 6 | 1 | 4
(Japan) Kaichi Uchida | 6 | 6
PR | (Israel) Dudi Sela | 3 | 3
(Italy) Andreas Seppi | 6 | 5 | 6
(Slovakia) Filip Horanský | 4 | 7 | 2
PR | (India) Sumit Nagal | 6^{2} | 4
26 | (Canada) Vasek Pospisil | 7^{7} | 6

Second round
8 | (Argentina) Facundo Bagnis | 6 | 6
(Japan) Kaichi Uchida | 2 | 3
(Italy) Andreas Seppi | 3 | 6 | 7
26 | (Canada) Vasek Pospisil | 6 | 2 | 5

Qualifying competition
8 | (Argentina) Facundo Bagnis | 7 | 6
(Italy) Andreas Seppi | 5 | 2

=== Ninth qualifier ===
First round
9 | (Moldova) Radu Albot | 6^{4} | 4
PR | (India) Yuki Bhambri | 7^{7} | 6
(Belgium) Zizou Bergs | 6 | 6
(Argentina) Renzo Olivo | 2 | 4
(Italy) Gian Marco Moroni | 6^{4} | 4
(Argentina) Andrea Collarini | 7^{7} | 6
(Argentina) Marco Trungelliti | 4 | 4
32 | (China) Zhang Zhizhen | 6 | 6

Second round
PR | (India) Yuki Bhambri | 3 | 2
(Belgium) Zizou Bergs | 6 | 6
(Argentina) Andrea Collarini | 2 | 5
32 | (China) Zhang Zhizhen | 6 | 7

Qualifying competition
(Belgium) Zizou Bergs | 2 | 4
32 | (China) Zhang Zhizhen | 6 | 6

=== Tenth qualifier ===
First round
10 | (Italy) Franco Agamenone | 4 | 6 | 6
(Argentina) Francisco Comesaña | 6 | 3 | 1
PR | (Italy) Roberto Marcora | 6 | 6
(Argentina) Genaro Alberto Olivieri | 4 | 1
(Switzerland) Alexander Ritschard | 6 | 6
(France) Evan Furness | 1 | 2
WC | (United States) Zachary Svajda | 7 | 6
28 | (Australia) Aleksandar Vukic | 5 | 4

Second round
10 | (Italy) Franco Agamenone | 7^{7} | 2 | 6
PR | (Italy) Roberto Marcora | 6^{3} | 6 | 1
(Switzerland) Alexander Ritschard | 6 | 5 | 6
WC | (United States) Zachary Svajda | 4 | 7 | 1

Qualifying competition
10 | (Italy) Franco Agamenone | 2 | 6 | 4
(Switzerland) Alexander Ritschard | 6 | 2 | 6

=== Eleventh qualifier ===
First round
11 | (France) Corentin Moutet | 6 | 6
(Croatia) Nino Serdarušić | 4 | 2
(Austria) Filip Misolic | 6^{3} | 7^{8} | 6
WC | (United States) Martin Damm | 7^{7} | 6^{6} | 3
(Italy) Stefano Travaglia | 6 | 6
(Belgium) Michael Geerts | 3 | 4
(China) Wu Yibing | 6 | 6
18 | (Lithuania) Ričardas Berankis | 4 | 3

Second round
11 | (France) Corentin Moutet | 6 | 6
(Austria) Filip Misolic | 2 | 4
(Italy) Stefano Travaglia | 7^{7} | 6^{4} | 3
(China) Wu Yibing | 6^{4} | 7^{7} | 6

Qualifying competition
11 | (France) Corentin Moutet | 6^{5} | 2
(China) Wu Yibing | 7^{7} | 6

=== Twelfth qualifier ===
First round
12 | Pavel Kotov | 7 | 6
(Brazil) Felipe Meligeni Alves | 5 | 3
(Austria) Sebastian Ofner | 7^{9} | 5 | 6
(Germany) Yannick Hanfmann | 6^{7} | 7 | 4
(Argentina) Nicolás Kicker | 3 | 7^{7} | 0^{r}
(Kazakhstan) Mikhail Kukushkin | 6 | 6^{4} | 4
(Italy) Gianluca Mager | 6^{5} | 3
19 | (Spain) Fernando Verdasco | 7^{7} | 6

Second round
12 | Pavel Kotov | 6 | 6
(Austria) Sebastian Ofner | 3 | 4
(Kazakhstan) Mikhail Kukushkin | 6^{4} | 3
19 | (Spain) Fernando Verdasco | 7^{7} | 6

Qualifying competition
12 | Pavel Kotov | 6 | 7^{7}
19 | (Spain) Fernando Verdasco | 1 | 6^{3}

=== Thirteenth qualifier ===
First round
13 | (Slovakia) Norbert Gombos | 6 | 6
(United Kingdom) Jay Clarke | 4 | 4
(Italy) Andrea Pellegrino | 6 | 6^{3} | 2
(Kazakhstan) Dmitry Popko | 4 | 7^{7} | 6
PR | (Australia) Marc Polmans | 4 | 6^{2}
(Italy) Francesco Passaro | 6 | 7^{7}
(Italy) Giulio Zeppieri | 6 | 3 | 4
17 | (France) Hugo Grenier | 1 | 6 | 6

Second round
13 | (Slovakia) Norbert Gombos | 6 | 4 | 6
(Kazakhstan) Dmitry Popko | 4 | 6 | 2
(Italy) Francesco Passaro | 6^{12} | 1
17 | (France) Hugo Grenier | 7^{14} | 6

Qualifying competition
13 | (Slovakia) Norbert Gombos | 6 | 3 | 6
17 | (France) Hugo Grenier | 4 | 6 | 3

=== Fourteenth qualifier ===
First round
14 | (Ecuador) Emilio Gómez | 7^{8} | 6
(United States) Mitchell Krueger | 6^{6} | 4
(France) Alexandre Müller | 6 | 4 | 6^{5}
WC | (United States) Brandon Holt | 3 | 6 | 7^{10}
(Bulgaria) Dimitar Kuzmanov | 4 | 7^{7} | 6
(Italy) Luca Nardi | 6 | 6^{5} | 4
WC | (United States) Murphy Cassone | 6 | 6^{3} | 1
25 | (United Kingdom) Liam Broady | 3 | 7^{7} | 6

Second round
14 | (Ecuador) Emilio Gómez | 6 | 3 | 2
WC | (United States) Brandon Holt | 2 | 6 | 6
(Bulgaria) Dimitar Kuzmanov | 4 | 6 | 6
25 | (United Kingdom) Liam Broady | 6 | 1 | 4

Qualifying competition
WC | (United States) Brandon Holt | 6 | 3 | 6
(Bulgaria) Dimitar Kuzmanov | 4 | 6 | 3

=== Fifteenth qualifier ===
First round
15 | (Spain) Carlos Taberner | 6 | 6
(Argentina) Thiago Agustín Tirante | 4 | 2
(Brazil) Daniel Dutra da Silva | 5 | 7^{7} | 2
(Germany) Maximilian Marterer | 7 | 6^{4} | 6
(Czech Republic) Jonáš Forejtek | 4 | 6 | 3
(Italy) Riccardo Bonadio | 6 | 4 | 6
(Croatia) Borna Gojo | 6^{3} | 7^{7} | 6
21 | (Switzerland) Dominic Stricker | 7^{7} | 6^{3} | 3

Second round
15 | (Spain) Carlos Taberner | 3 | 6 | 6^{6}
(Germany) Maximilian Marterer | 6 | 3 | 7^{10}
(Italy) Riccardo Bonadio | 4 | 7^{13} | 6
(Croatia) Borna Gojo | 6 | 6^{11} | 2

Qualifying competition
(Germany) Maximilian Marterer | 6 | 6
(Italy) Riccardo Bonadio | 4 | 3

=== Sixteenth qualifier ===
First round
16 | (Chile) Nicolás Jarry | 3 | 6 | 6
(Argentina) Facundo Díaz Acosta | 6 | 3 | 4
(Argentina) Juan Bautista Torres | 6^{4} | 6 | 6^{4}
(United States) Bjorn Fratangelo | 7^{7} | 3 | 7^{10}
(Czech Republic) Dalibor Svrčina | 1 | 6 | 6
(France) Laurent Lokoli | 6 | 4 | 2
(United States) Aleksandar Kovacevic | 6^{6} | 1
31 | (Austria) Dennis Novak | 7^{8} | 6

Second round
16 | (Chile) Nicolás Jarry | 7^{7} | 4 | 6
(United States) Bjorn Fratangelo | 6^{4} | 6 | 3
(Czech Republic) Dalibor Svrčina | 3 | 4
31 | (Austria) Dennis Novak | 6 | 6

Qualifying competition
16 | (Chile) Nicolás Jarry | 6 | 6
31 | (Austria) Dennis Novak | 3 | 3
