= 2022 US Open – Wheelchair boys' singles =

Wheelchair boys' singles
- 2022 US Open

Final
- Champion: (United Kingdom) Ben Bartram
- Runner-up: (United Kingdom) Dahnon Ward
- Score: 6–4, 6–1

Details
- Draw: 8
- Seeds: 2

Events
Singles	men	women		boys	girls
Doubles	men	women	mixed	boys	girls
WC Singles	men	women	quad	boys	girls
WC Doubles	men	women	quad	boys	girls
- US Open

The 2022 US Open wheelchair boys' singles tournament was part of the US Open Wheelchair Championships held at the USTA Billie Jean King National Tennis Center. This tournament marked a historic moment for wheelchair tennis as it featured the first-ever junior wheelchair singles competition at the US Open.

== Seeds ==
1. (United Kingdom) Ben Bartram (champion)
2. (United Kingdom) Andrew Penney (quarterfinals)

== Draw ==
Key

- Q = Qualifier
- WC = Wild card
- LL = Lucky loser
- Alt = Alternate
- ITF = ITF entry
- PR = Protected ranking
- SR = Special ranking
- SE = Special exempt
- JE = Junior exempt
- JR = Junior Accelerator Programme entrant
- CO = College Accelerator Programme entrant
- NG = Next Gen Accelerator Program entrant
- w/o = Walkover
- r = Retired
- d = Defaulted

=== Draw ===
Quarterfinals
1	(United Kingdom) Ben Bartram	6	6
(Netherlands) Ivar van Rijt	1	2
(United Kingdom) Joshua Johns	3	3
(Australia) Saalim Nasar	6	6
(Austria) Maximilian Taucher	6	7
(United States) Charlie Cooper	3	5
(United Kingdom) Dahnon Ward	6	6
2	(United Kingdom) Andrew Penney	2	1

Semifinals
1	(United Kingdom) Ben Bartram	6	6
(Australia) Saalim Nasar	4	3
(Austria) Maximilian Taucher	2	0
(United Kingdom) Dahnon Ward	6	6

Final
(United Kingdom) Ben Bartram	6	6
(United Kingdom) Dahnon Ward	4	1

== Champion ==
Ben Bartram will forever be known as the first-ever winner of the US Open Junior Wheelchair Boys' Championships. The top-seeded Brit triumphed in the boys' singles final of the inaugural under-18 event of the US Open Wheelchair Championships presented by Deloitte.

Bartram, the top seed and world No. 2, started the day with a 6-4, 6-1 win over compatriot Dahnon Ward on Court 6.

"It's just an amazing feeling to know that I'll always be the first winner. It's just a great feeling," Bartram said in victory.

"It's different from any tournament that I've ever been to. It's just an amazing atmosphere. It's just the best facilities. It's just been amazing."
