= 2022 US Open – Wheelchair girls' singles =

Wheelchair girls' singles
- 2022 US Open

Final
- Champion: (Brazil) Jade Lanai
- Runner-up: (Japan) Yuma Takamuro
- Score: 7–5, 2–6, 7–6[10–5]

Details
- Draw: 8
- Seeds: 2

Events
Singles	men	women		boys	girls
Doubles	men	women	mixed	boys	girls
WC Singles	men	women	quad	boys	girls
WC Doubles	men	women	quad	boys	girls
- US Open

The 2022 US Open wheelchair girls' singles tournament was part of the US Open Wheelchair Championships held at the USTA Billie Jean King National Tennis Center. This tournament was the first-ever junior wheelchair singles competition at the US Open.

== Seeds ==
1. (United States) Maylee Phelps (semifinals)
2. (United Kingdom) Ruby Bishop (semifinals)

== Draw ==
Key

- Q = Qualifier
- WC = Wild card
- LL = Lucky loser
- Alt = Alternate
- ITF = ITF entry
- PR = Protected ranking
- SR = Special ranking
- SE = Special exempt
- JE = Junior exempt
- JR = Junior Accelerator Programme entrant
- CO = College Accelerator Programme entrant
- NG = Next Gen Accelerator Program entrant
- w/o = Walkover
- r = Retired
- d = Defaulted

=== Draw ===
Quarterfinals
1	(United States) Maylee Phelps	6	6
(Germany) Ela Porges	0	0
(Brazil) Jade Lanai	6	6
(United States) Lily Lautenschlager	0	0
(Japan) Yuma Takamuro	6	6
(United Kingdom) Ellie Robertson	3	4
(United States) Sabina Czauz	1	1
2	(United Kingdom) Ruby Bishop	6	6

Semifinals
1	(United States) Maylee Phelps	7^{7}	1	1
(Brazil) Jade Lanai	6^{3}	6	6
(Japan) Yuma Takamuro	4	7	6
2	(United Kingdom) Ruby Bishop	6	5	3

Final
(Brazil) Jade Lanai	7	2	7^{10}
(Japan) Yuma Takamuro	5	6	6^{5}
