= 2022 US Open – Wheelchair boys' doubles =

Wheelchair boys' doubles
- 2022 US Open

Final
- Champion: (United Kingdom) Ben Bartram (United Kingdom) Dahnon Ward
- Runner-up: (Australia) Saalim Nasar (Netherlands) Ivar van Rijt
- Score: 6–4, 6–3

Details
- Draw: 4
- Seeds: 2

Events
Singles	men	women		boys	girls
Doubles	men	women	mixed	boys	girls
WC Singles	men	women	quad	boys	girls
WC Doubles	men	women	quad	boys	girls
- US Open

The 2022 US Open wheelchair boys' doubles tournament was part of the 2022 edition of the US Open Wheelchair Championships held at the USTA Billie Jean King National Tennis Center. This tournament marked a historic moment for wheelchair tennis as it featured the first-ever junior wheelchair doubles competition at the US Open and was also the first time junior wheelchair competitions were held at Grand Slam tournaments in general.

== Seeds ==
1. (United Kingdom) Ben Bartram / (United Kingdom) Dahnon Ward (champions)
2. (United Kingdom) Andrew Penney / (Austria) Maximilian Taucher (semifinals)

== Draw ==
Key

- Q = Qualifier
- WC = Wild card
- LL = Lucky loser
- Alt = Alternate
- ITF = ITF entry
- PR = Protected ranking
- SR = Special ranking
- SE = Special exempt
- JE = Junior exempt
- JR = Junior Accelerator Programme entrant
- CO = College Accelerator Programme entrant
- NG = Next Gen Accelerator Program entrant
- w/o = Walkover
- r = Retired
- d = Defaulted

=== Finals ===
Semifinals
1	(United Kingdom) Ben Bartram (United Kingdom) Dahnon Ward	6	6
(United States) Charlie Cooper (United Kingdom) Joshua Johns	2	1
(Australia) Saalim Nasar (Netherlands) Ivar van Rijt	1	7	[10]
2	(United Kingdom) Andrew Penney (Austria) Maximilian Taucher	6	6	[8]

Final
1	(United Kingdom) Ben Bartram (United Kingdom) Dahnon Ward	6	6
(Australia) Saalim Nasar (Netherlands) Ivar van Rijt	4	3

== Champions ==
Ben Bartram and Dahnon Ward manned the same side of the net in a 6-4, 6-3 win over Saalim Naser and Ivar van Rijt in the boys' doubles final. Bartram said:

“It's amazing to be the first junior doubles champions. We first played doubles together when we were 12 or 13, so we’ve definitely come a long way."

“In singles we both want to win, but it’s a great thing to be on court in the final knowing a British player will be the winner no matter what the result after all the work people have put in with us at the LTA and everywhere else.”

Dahnon Ward added: “It was a bit of a ropey first set, but sometimes you have those matches when you just have to pull through. It’s one for the history books and very special for both of us.

“In the great scheme of things there's no pressure on either of us to win in the (singles) final. People develop at different rates, and it can be hard at times, but this is why we play - for these moments.”

Bartram and Ward are both part of the LTA’s Wheelchair Performance Pathway.

== Significance ==
The introduction of the junior wheelchair events at the US Open highlighted the commitment of the tournament to promoting inclusivity in tennis. The initiative was widely praised for providing young athletes with disabilities an opportunity to compete on one of the biggest stages in the sport.
