= 2022 US Open – Day-by-day summaries =

Tennis tournament match results

The 2022 US Open described in detail, in the form of day-by-day summaries.

== Day 1 (August 29) ==
- Seeds out:
  - Men's Singles: (Greece) Stefanos Tsitsipas [4], (United States) Taylor Fritz [10], (Spain) Roberto Bautista Agut [16], (Argentina) Francisco Cerúndolo [24], (United States) Maxime Cressy [30], (Georgia (country)) Nikoloz Basilashvili [31]
  - Women's Singles: (Romania) Simona Halep [7], Daria Kasatkina [10], (Italy) Martina Trevisan [27], (Switzerland) Jil Teichmann [30]
- Schedule of Play

Matches on main courts
Matches on Arthur Ashe Stadium
Event	Winner	Loser	Score
Men's Singles 1st Round	Daniil Medvedev [1]	(United States) Stefan Kozlov	6–2, 6–4, 6–0
Women's Singles 1st Round	(United States) Coco Gauff [12]	(France) Léolia Jeanjean [Q]	6–2, 6–3
2022 US Open Opening Night Ceremony
Women's Singles 1st Round	(United States) Serena Williams [PR]	(Montenegro) Danka Kovinić	6–3, 6–3
Men's Singles 1st Round	(Australia) Nick Kyrgios [23]	(Australia) Thanasi Kokkinakis	6–3, 6–4, 7–6^{(7–4)}
Matches on Louis Armstrong Stadium
Event	Winner	Loser	Score
Men's Singles 1st Round	(United Kingdom) Andy Murray	(Argentina) Francisco Cerúndolo [24]	7–5, 6–3, 6–3
Women's Singles 1st Round	(Ukraine) Daria Snigur [Q]	(Romania) Simona Halep [7]	6–2, 0–6, 6–4
Women's Singles 1st Round	(United States) Madison Keys [20]	(Ukraine) Dayana Yastremska	7–6^{(7–3)}, 6–3
Men's Singles 1st Round	(Colombia) Daniel Elahi Galán [Q]	(Greece) Stefanos Tsitsipas [4]	6–0, 6–1, 3–6, 7–5
Women's Singles 1st Round	(Canada) Leylah Fernandez [14]	(France) Océane Dodin	6–3, 6–4
Matches on Grandstand
Event	Winner	Loser	Score
Women's Singles 1st Round	(Greece) Maria Sakkari [3]	(Germany) Tatjana Maria	6–4, 3–6, 6–0
Women's Singles 1st Round	(Canada) Bianca Andreescu	(France) Harmony Tan [WC]	6–0, 3–6, 6–1
Men's Singles 1st Round	(Canada) Félix Auger-Aliassime [6]	(Switzerland) Alexander Ritschard [Q]	6–3, 6–4, 3–6, 6–3
Men's Singles 1st Round	(United States) Brandon Holt [Q]	(United States) Taylor Fritz [10]	6–7^{(3–7)}, 7–6^{(7–1)}, 6–3, 6–4
Colored background indicates a night match
Matches start at 12 pm (Arthur Ashe Stadium) and 11am (other courts), night session starts at 7pm Eastern Daylight Time (EDT)

== Day 2 (August 30) ==
- Seeds out:
  - Women's Singles: (United Kingdom) Emma Raducanu [11], (Latvia) Jeļena Ostapenko [16], (United States) Amanda Anisimova [24], (Kazakhstan) Elena Rybakina [25], (Belgium) Elise Mertens [32]
- Schedule of Play

Matches on main courts
Matches on Arthur Ashe Stadium
Event	Winner	Loser	Score
Men's Singles 1st Round	(Spain) Carlos Alcaraz [3]	(Argentina) Sebastián Báez	7–5, 7–5, 2–0, retired
Women's Singles 1st Round	(Belgium) Alison Van Uytvanck	(United States) Venus Williams [WC]	6–1, 7–6^{(7–5)}
Men's Singles 1st Round	(Spain) Rafael Nadal [2]	(Australia) Rinky Hijikata [WC]	4–6, 6–2, 6–3, 6–3
Women's Singles 1st Round	(United States) Danielle Collins [19]	(Japan) Naomi Osaka	7–6^{(7–5)}, 6–3
Matches on Louis Armstrong Stadium
Event	Winner	Loser	Score
Women's Singles 1st Round	(Poland) Iga Świątek [1]	(Italy) Jasmine Paolini	6–3, 6–0
Women's Singles 1st Round	(United States) Sloane Stephens	(Belgium) Greet Minnen	1–6, 6–3, 6–3
Men's Singles 1st Round	(Italy) Jannik Sinner [11]	(Germany) Daniel Altmaier	5–7, 6–2, 6–1, 3–6, 6–1
Women's Singles 1st Round	(France) Alizé Cornet	(United Kingdom) Emma Raducanu [11]	6–3, 6–3
Men's Singles 1st Round	(Argentina) Diego Schwartzman [14]	(United States) Jack Sock	3–6, 5–7, 6–0, 1–0, retired
Matches on Grandstand
Event	Winner	Loser	Score
Women's Singles 1st Round	(United States) Jessica Pegula [8]	(Switzerland) Viktorija Golubic [Q]	6–2, 6–2
Men's Singles 1st Round	(United States) John Isner	(Argentina) Federico Delbonis [Q]	6–3, 6–1, 7–5
Men's Singles 1st Round	(Croatia) Marin Čilić [15]	(Germany) Maximilian Marterer [Q]	6–3, 6–2, 7–5
Women's Singles 1st Round	(Kazakhstan) Yulia Putintseva	(United States) Amanda Anisimova [24]	6–3, 6–3
Women's Singles 1st Round (Note: This match was originally scheduled to play on Court 12 but was moved to the Grandstand following the conclusion of the Anisimova-Putintseva match.)	(Germany) Jule Niemeier	(United States) Sofia Kenin [WC]	7–6^{(7–3)}, 6–4
Colored background indicates a night match
Matches start at 12 pm (Arthur Ashe Stadium) and 11am (other courts), night session starts at 7pm Eastern Daylight Time (EDT)

== Day 3 (August 31) ==
There were major upsets that rocked the women's singles. Two of the top three seeds were knocked out. Anett Kontaveit and Maria Sakkari both lost to unseeded players. Also, the children of former champions Tracy Austin and Hana Mandlíková both lost in the second round.

- Seeds out:
  - Men's Singles: (Canada) Félix Auger-Aliassime [6], (Netherlands) Botic van de Zandschulp [21]
  - Women's Singles: (Estonia) Anett Kontaveit [2], (Greece) Maria Sakkari [3], (Canada) Leylah Fernandez [14], (Brazil) Beatriz Haddad Maia [15], (Czech Republic) Barbora Krejcikova [23]
  - Men's Doubles: (Spain) Marcel Granollers / (Argentina) Horacio Zeballos [5], (France) Nicolas Mahut / (France) Édouard Roger-Vasselin [16]
- Schedule of Play

Matches on main courts
Matches on Arthur Ashe Stadium
Event	Winner	Loser	Score
Men's Singles 2nd Round	(United Kingdom) Andy Murray	(United States) Emilio Nava [WC]	5–7, 6–3, 6–1, 6–0
Women's Singles 2nd Round	(United States) Coco Gauff [12]	(Romania) Elena-Gabriela Ruse	6–2, 7–6^{(7–4)}
Women's Singles 2nd Round	(United States) Serena Williams [PR]	(Estonia) Anett Kontaveit [2]	7–6^{(7–4)}, 2–6, 6–2
Men's Singles 2nd Round	Daniil Medvedev [1]	(France) Arthur Rinderknech	6–2, 7–5, 6–3
Matches on Louis Armstrong Stadium
Event	Winner	Loser	Score
Women's Singles 2nd Round	(China) Wang Xiyu	(Greece) Maria Sakkari [3]	3–6, 7–5, 7–5
Women's Singles 2nd Round	(United States) Madison Keys [20]	(Italy) Camila Giorgi	6–4, 5–7, 7–6^{(10–6)}
Men's Singles 2nd Round	(Australia) Nick Kyrgios [23]	(France) Benjamin Bonzi	7–6^{(7–3)}, 6–4, 4–6, 6–4
Men's Singles 2nd Round	(United Kingdom) Jack Draper	(Canada) Félix Auger-Aliassime [6]	6–4, 6–4, 6–4
Women's Singles 2nd Round	(Canada) Bianca Andreescu	(Brazil) Beatriz Haddad Maia [15]	6–2, 6–4
Matches on Grandstand
Event	Winner	Loser	Score
Women's Singles 2nd Round	(Tunisia) Ons Jabeur [5]	(United States) Elizabeth Mandlik [WC]	7–5, 6–2
Men's Singles 2nd Round	(Italy) Matteo Berrettini [13]	(France) Hugo Grenier [LL]	2–6, 6–1, 7–6^{(7–4)}, 7–6^{(9–7)}
Men's Singles 2nd Round	(United States) Tommy Paul [29]	(United States) Sebastian Korda	6–0, 3–6, 4–6, 6–3, 6–4
Women's Singles 2nd Round	Liudmila Samsonova	(Canada) Leylah Fernandez [14]	6–3, 7–6^{(7–3)}
Colored background indicates a night match
Matches start at 12 pm (Arthur Ashe Stadium) and 11am (other courts), night session starts at 7pm Eastern Daylight Time (EDT)

== Day 4 (September 1) ==
Fourteen-time major doubles champions Serena and Venus Williams played in their final doubles match as a team, losing to Lucie Hradecká and Linda Nosková in straight sets.

- Seeds out:
  - Men's Singles: (Poland) Hubert Hurkacz [8], (Bulgaria) Grigor Dimitrov [17], (Croatia) Borna Ćorić [25], (Serbia) Miomir Kecmanović [32]
  - Women's Singles: (Spain) Paula Badosa [4], Ekaterina Alexandrova [28]
  - Men's Doubles: (India) Rohan Bopanna / (Netherlands) Matwé Middelkoop [9], (Mexico) Santiago González / (Argentina) Andrés Molteni [14]
  - Women's Doubles: (United States) Coco Gauff / (United States) Jessica Pegula [2]
  - Mixed Doubles: (Mexico) Giuliana Olmos / (El Salvador) Marcelo Arévalo [3]
- Schedule of Play

Matches on main courts
Matches on Arthur Ashe Stadium
Event	Winner	Loser	Score
Women's Singles 2nd Round	(Poland) Iga Świątek [1]	(United States) Sloane Stephens	6–3, 6–2
Men's Singles 2nd Round	(Spain) Carlos Alcaraz [3]	(Argentina) Federico Coria	6–1, 6–2, 7–5
Women's Doubles 1st Round	(Czech Republic) Lucie Hradecká (Czech Republic) Linda Nosková	(United States) Serena Williams [WC] (United States) Venus Williams [WC]	7–6^{(7–5)}, 6–4
Men's Singles 2nd Round	(Spain) Rafael Nadal [2]	(Italy) Fabio Fognini	2–6, 6–4, 6–2, 6–1
Matches on Louis Armstrong Stadium
Event	Winner	Loser	Score
Women's Singles 2nd Round	(United States) Jessica Pegula [8]	Aliaksandra Sasnovich	6–4, 6–4
Men's Singles 2nd Round	(Italy) Jannik Sinner [11]	(United States) Christopher Eubanks [Q]	6–4, 7–6^{(10–8)}, 6–2
Women's Singles 2nd Round	(Spain) Garbiñe Muguruza [9]	(Czech Republic) Linda Fruhvirtová [Q]	6–0, 6–4
Women's Singles 2nd Round	(United States) Danielle Collins [19]	(Spain) Cristina Bucșa [Q]	6–2, 7–5
Men's Doubles 1st Round	(Australia) Thanasi Kokkinakis [8] (Australia) Nick Kyrgios [8]	(France) Hugo Gaston (Italy) Lorenzo Musetti	4–6, 6–3, 6–4
Matches on Grandstand
Event	Winner	Loser	Score
Men's Singles 2nd Round	(United States) Jenson Brooksby	(Croatia) Borna Ćorić [25/PR]	6–4, 7–6^{(12–10)}, 6–1
Women's Singles 2nd Round	(Czech Republic) Petra Kvitová [21]	(Ukraine) Anhelina Kalinina	Walkover
Women's Singles 2nd Round (Note: This match was originally scheduled to play on Court 12 but was moved to the Grandstand following Kalinina's withdrawal.)	(France) Alizé Cornet	(Czech Republic) Kateřina Siniaková	6–1, 1–6, 6–3
Women's Doubles 1st Round	(Canada) Leylah Fernandez (Australia) Daria Saville	(United States) Coco Gauff [2] (United States) Jessica Pegula [2]	3–6, 7–5, 7–6^{(10–5)}
Men's Singles 2nd Round	(United States) Frances Tiafoe [22]	(Australia) Jason Kubler	7–6^{(7–3)}, 7–5, 7–6^{(7–2)}
Colored background indicates a night match
Matches start at 12 pm (Arthur Ashe Stadium) and 11am (other courts), night session starts at 7pm Eastern Daylight Time (EDT)

== Day 5 (September 2) ==
Twenty-three time major champion Serena Williams played in her final professional match of her career, losing to Ajla Tomljanović in three sets.

- Seeds out:
  - Men's Singles: (Australia) Alex de Minaur [18], (United States) Tommy Paul [29]
  - Women's Singles: (United States) Madison Keys [20], (United States) Shelby Rogers [31]
  - Men's Doubles: (Croatia) Ivan Dodig / (United States) Austin Krajicek [7], (United Kingdom) Jamie Murray / (Brazil) Bruno Soares [10], (Germany) Kevin Krawietz / (Germany) Andreas Mies [12]
  - Women's Doubles: Veronika Kudermetova / (Belgium) Elise Mertens [1], (Poland) Alicja Rosolska / (New Zealand) Erin Routliffe [16]
  - Mixed Doubles: (China) Yang Zhaoxuan / (India) Rohan Bopanna [6], (Netherlands) Demi Schuurs / (Netherlands) Matwé Middelkoop [8]
- Schedule of Play

Matches on main courts
Matches on Arthur Ashe Stadium
Event	Winner	Loser	Score
Men's Singles 3rd Round	(Italy) Matteo Berrettini [13]	(United Kingdom) Andy Murray	6–4, 6–4, 6–7^{(1–7)}, 6–3
Women's Singles 3rd Round	(United States) Coco Gauff [12]	(United States) Madison Keys [20]	6–2, 6–3
Women's Singles 3rd Round	(Australia) Ajla Tomljanović	(United States) Serena Williams [PR]	7–5, 6–7^{(4–7)}, 6–1
Men's Singles 3rd Round	Daniil Medvedev [1]	(China) Wu Yibing [Q]	6–4, 6–2, 6–2
Matches on Louis Armstrong Stadium
Event	Winner	Loser	Score
Women's Singles 3rd Round	(Tunisia) Ons Jabeur [5]	(United States) Shelby Rogers [31]	4–6, 6–4, 6–3
Men's Singles 3rd Round	(Norway) Casper Ruud [5]	(United States) Tommy Paul [29]	7–6^{(7–3)}, 6–7^{(5–7)}, 7–6^{(7–2)}, 5–7, 6–0
Women's Singles 3rd Round	(France) Caroline Garcia [17]	(Canada) Bianca Andreescu	6–3, 6–2
Men's Singles 3rd Round	(Australia) Nick Kyrgios [23]	(United States) J. J. Wolf [WC]	6–4, 6–2, 6–3
Matches on Grandstand
Event	Winner	Loser	Score
Men's Doubles 2nd Round	(United States) Rajeev Ram [1] (United Kingdom) Joe Salisbury [1]	Aslan Karatsev (Australia) Luke Saville	6–4, 6–3
Women's Singles 3rd Round	Veronika Kudermetova [18]	(Hungary) Dalma Gálfi	6–2, 6–0
Men's Singles 3rd Round	Karen Khachanov [27]	(United Kingdom) Jack Draper	6–3, 4–6, 6–5, retired
Men's Singles 3rd Round	(Spain) Pablo Carreño Busta [12]	(Australia) Alex de Minaur [18]	6–1, 6–1, 3–6, 7–6^{(7–5)}
Colored background indicates a night match
Matches start at 12 pm (Arthur Ashe Stadium) and 11am (other courts), night session starts at 7pm Eastern Daylight Time (EDT)

== Day 6 (September 3) ==
- Seeds out:
  - Men's Singles: (Argentina) Diego Schwartzman [14], (Canada) Denis Shapovalov [19], (United Kingdom) Dan Evans [20], (Italy) Lorenzo Musetti [26], (Denmark) Holger Rune [28]
  - Women's Singles: (Spain) Garbiñe Muguruza [9], (Switzerland) Belinda Bencic [13]
  - Mixed Doubles: (United States) Jessica Pegula / (United States) Austin Krajicek [5], (Australia) Ellen Perez / (New Zealand) Michael Venus [7]
- Schedule of Play

Matches on main courts
Matches on Arthur Ashe Stadium
Event	Winner	Loser	Score
Women's Singles 3rd Round	(United States) Jessica Pegula [8]	(China) Yuan Yue [Q]	6–2, 6–7^{(6–8)}, 6–0
Men's Singles 3rd Round	(Spain) Carlos Alcaraz [3]	(United States) Jenson Brooksby	6–3, 6–3, 6–3
Men's Singles 3rd Round	(Spain) Rafael Nadal [2]	(France) Richard Gasquet	6–0, 6–1, 7–5
Women's Singles 3rd Round	(United States) Danielle Collins [19]	(France) Alizé Cornet	6–2, 7–6^{(11–9)}
Matches on Louis Armstrong Stadium
Event	Winner	Loser	Score
Women's Singles 3rd Round	(Czech Republic) Petra Kvitová [21]	(Spain) Garbiñe Muguruza [9]	5–7, 6–3, 7–6^{(12–10)}
Women's Singles 3rd Round	Victoria Azarenka [26]	(Croatia) Petra Martić	6–3, 6–0
Men's Singles 3rd Round	(United States) Frances Tiafoe [22]	(Argentina) Diego Schwartzman [14]	7–6^{(9–7)}, 6–4, 6–4
Women's Singles 3rd Round	(Poland) Iga Świątek [1]	(United States) Lauren Davis	6–3, 6–4
Men's Singles 3rd Round	(Italy) Jannik Sinner [11]	(United States) Brandon Nakashima	3–6, 6–4. 6–1, 6–2
Matches on Grandstand
Event	Winner	Loser	Score
Men's Singles 3rd Round	(United Kingdom) Cameron Norrie [7]	(Denmark) Holger Rune [28]	7–5, 6–4, 6–1
Men's Singles 3rd Round	Andrey Rublev [9]	(Canada) Denis Shapovalov [19]	6–4, 2–6, 6–7^{(3–7)}, 6–4, 7–6^{(10–7)}
Women's Singles 3rd Round	(Czech Republic) Karolína Plíšková [22]	(Switzerland) Belinda Bencic [13]	5–7, 6–4, 6–3
Women's Singles 3rd Round	Aryna Sabalenka [6]	(France) Clara Burel [Q]	6–0, 6–2
Colored background indicates a night match
Matches start at 12 pm (Arthur Ashe Stadium) and 11am (other courts), night session starts at 7pm Eastern Daylight Time (EDT)

== Day 7 (September 4) ==
- Seeds out:
  - Men's Singles: Daniil Medvedev [1], (Spain) Pablo Carreño Busta [12]
  - Women's Singles: Veronika Kudermetova [18], (United States) Alison Riske-Amritraj [29]
  - Men's Doubles: (Italy) Simone Bolelli / (Italy) Fabio Fognini [15]
  - Women's Doubles: (Kazakhstan) Anna Danilina / (Brazil) Beatriz Haddad Maia [8], (United States) Asia Muhammad / (Japan) Ena Shibahara [9], (Chile) Alexa Guarachi / (Slovenia) Andreja Klepač [13], (Japan) Shuko Aoyama / (Chinese Taipei) Chan Hao-ching [15]
  - Mixed Doubles: (United States) Desirae Krawczyk / (United Kingdom) Neal Skupski [1]
- Schedule of Play

Matches on main courts
Matches on Arthur Ashe Stadium
Event	Winner	Loser	Score
Men's Singles 4th Round	(Norway) Casper Ruud [5]	(France) Corentin Moutet [LL]	6–1, 6–2, 6–7^{(4–7)}, 6–2
Women's Singles 4th Round	(United States) Coco Gauff [12]	(China) Zhang Shuai	7–5, 7–5
Men's Singles 4th Round	(Australia) Nick Kyrgios [23]	Daniil Medvedev [1]	7–6^{(13–11)}, 3–6, 6–3, 6–2
Women's Singles 4th Round	(Tunisia) Ons Jabeur [5]	Veronika Kudermetova [18]	7–6^{(7–1)}, 6–4
Matches on Louis Armstrong Stadium
Event	Winner	Loser	Score
Men's Singles 4th Round	(Italy) Matteo Berrettini [13]	(Spain) Alejandro Davidovich Fokina	3–6, 7–6^{(7–2)}, 6–3, 4–6, 6–2
Women's Singles 4th Round	(France) Caroline Garcia [17]	(United States) Alison Riske-Amritraj [29]	6–4, 6–1
Men's Singles 4th Round	Karen Khachanov [27]	(Spain) Pablo Carreño Busta [12]	4–6, 6–3, 6–1, 4–6, 6–3
Women's Singles 4th Round	(Australia) Ajla Tomljanović	Liudmila Samsonova	7–6^{(10–8)}, 6–1
Matches on Grandstand
Event	Winner	Loser	Score
Men's Doubles 3rd Round	(El Salvador) Marcelo Arévalo [3] (Netherlands) Jean-Julien Rojer [3]	(France) Quentin Halys (France) Adrian Mannarino	6–4, 7–6^{(11–9)}
Men's Doubles 3rd Round	(United States) Rajeev Ram [1] (United Kingdom) Joe Salisbury [1]	(Italy) Simone Bolelli [15] (Italy) Fabio Fognini [15]	6–1, 7–5
Women's Doubles 3rd Round	(United States) Nicole Melichar-Martinez [10] (Australia) Ellen Perez [10]	(Kazakhstan) Anna Danilina [8] (Brazil) Beatriz Haddad Maia [8]	6–3, 6–3
Mixed Doubles 2nd Round	(China) Zhang Shuai [2] (Croatia) Mate Pavić [2]	(United States) Madison Keys [WC] (United States) Bjorn Fratangelo [WC]	6–4, 6–2
Colored background indicates a night match
Matches start at 12 pm (Arthur Ashe Stadium) and 11am (other courts), night session starts at 7pm Eastern Daylight Time (EDT)

== Day 8 (September 5) ==
- Seeds out:
  - Men's Singles: (Spain) Rafael Nadal [2], (United Kingdom) Cameron Norrie [7], (Croatia) Marin Čilić [15]
  - Women's Singles: (United States) Danielle Collins [19], (Czech Republic) Petra Kvitová [21], Victoria Azarenka [26]
  - Men's Doubles: (Germany) Tim Pütz / (New Zealand) Michael Venus [4], (Australia) Thanasi Kokkinakis / (Australia) Nick Kyrgios [8]
  - Women's Doubles: (Ukraine) Lyudmyla Kichenok / (Latvia) Jeļena Ostapenko [4], (China) Xu Yifan / (China) Yang Zhaoxuan [7], (Ukraine) Marta Kostyuk / (China) Zhang Shuai [11]
- Schedule of Play

Matches on main courts
Matches on Arthur Ashe Stadium
Event	Winner	Loser	Score
Women's Singles 4th Round	(United States) Jessica Pegula [8]	(Czech Republic) Petra Kvitová [21]	6–3, 6–2
Men's Singles 4th Round	(United States) Frances Tiafoe [22]	(Spain) Rafael Nadal [2]	6–4, 4–6, 6–4, 6–3
Women's Singles 4th Round	Aryna Sabalenka [6]	(United States) Danielle Collins [19]	3–6, 6–3, 6–2
Men's Singles 4th Round	(Spain) Carlos Alcaraz [3]	(Croatia) Marin Čilić [15]	6–3, 4–6, 6–4, 4–6, 6–3
Matches on Louis Armstrong Stadium
Event	Winner	Loser	Score
Men's Singles 4th Round	Andrey Rublev [9]	(United Kingdom) Cameron Norrie [7]	6–4, 6–4, 6–4
Women's Singles 4th Round	(Poland) Iga Świątek [1]	(Germany) Jule Niemeier	2–6, 6–4, 6–0
Women's Singles 4th Round	(Czech Republic) Karolína Plíšková [22]	Victoria Azarenka [26]	7–5, 6–7^{(5–7)}, 6–2
Men's Singles 4th Round	(Italy) Jannik Sinner [11]	Ilya Ivashka	6–1, 5–7, 6–2, 4–6, 6–3
Matches on Grandstand
Event	Winner	Loser	Score
Men's Doubles 3rd Round	(Colombia) Juan Sebastián Cabal [13] (Colombia) Robert Farah [13]	(Germany) Tim Pütz [4] (New Zealand) Michael Venus [4]	6–7^{(2–7)}, 6–4, 6–3
Women's Doubles 3rd Round	(France) Caroline Garcia [14] (France) Kristina Mladenovic [14]	(Ukraine) Lyudmyla Kichenok [4] (Latvia) Jeļena Ostapenko [4]	6–4, 6–2
Men's Doubles 3rd Round	(United Kingdom) Lloyd Glasspool [11] (Finland) Harri Heliövaara [11]	(Australia) Thanasi Kokkinakis [8] (Australia) Nick Kyrgios [8]	3–6, 7–6^{(8–6)}, 7–6^{(10–8)}
Mixed Doubles Quarterfinals	(China) Zhang Shuai [2] (Croatia) Mate Pavić [2]	(Japan) Ena Shibahara [PR] (Croatia) Franko Škugor [PR]	7–6^{(7–5)}, 4–6, [10–3]
Colored background indicates a night match
Matches start at 12 pm (Arthur Ashe Stadium) and 11am (other courts), night session starts at 7pm Eastern Daylight Time (EDT)

== Day 9 (September 6) ==
- Seeds out:
  - Men's Singles: (Italy) Matteo Berrettini [13], (Australia) Nick Kyrgios [23]
  - Women's Singles: (United States) Coco Gauff [12]
  - Men's Doubles: (Croatia) Nikola Mektić / (Croatia) Mate Pavić [6], (United Kingdom) Lloyd Glasspool / (Finland) Harri Heliövaara [11]
- Schedule of Play

Matches on main courts
Matches on Arthur Ashe Stadium
Event	Winner	Loser	Score
Men's Singles Quarterfinals	(Norway) Casper Ruud [5]	(Italy) Matteo Berrettini [13]	6–1, 6–4, 7–6^{(7–4)}
Women's Singles Quarterfinals	(Tunisia) Ons Jabeur [5]	(Australia) Ajla Tomljanović	6–4, 7–6^{(7–4)}
Women's Singles Quarterfinals	(France) Caroline Garcia [17]	(United States) Coco Gauff [12]	6–3, 6–4
Men's Singles Quarterfinals	Karen Khachanov [27]	(Australia) Nick Kyrgios [23]	7–5, 4–6, 7–5, 6–7^{(3–7)}, 6–4
Matches on Louis Armstrong Stadium
Event	Winner	Loser	Score
Men's Doubles Quarterfinals	(United States) Rajeev Ram [1] (United Kingdom) Joe Salisbury [1]	(Monaco) Hugo Nys (Poland) Jan Zieliński	6–4, 6–7^{(3–7)}, 6–4
Men's Doubles Quarterfinals	(Netherlands) Wesley Koolhof [2] (United Kingdom) Neal Skupski [2]	(Brazil) Marcelo Demoliner [PR] (Portugal) João Sousa [PR]	6–3, 6–1
Women's Doubles Quarterfinals	(United States) Nicole Melichar-Martinez [10] (Australia) Ellen Perez [10]	(Belgium) Kirsten Flipkens (Spain) Sara Sorribes Tormo	6–7^{(5–7)}, 6–4, 6–4
Men's Doubles Quarterfinals	(El Salvador) Marcelo Arévalo [3] (Netherlands) Jean-Julien Rojer [3]	(Croatia) Nikola Mektić [6] (Croatia) Mate Pavić [6]	6–3, 6–4
Men's Doubles Quarterfinals	(Colombia) Juan Sebastián Cabal [13] (Colombia) Robert Farah [13]	(United Kingdom) Lloyd Glasspool [11] (Finland) Harri Heliövaara [11]	7–6^{(7–5)}, 6–2
Matches on Grandstand
Event	Winner	Loser	Score
Women's Doubles Quarterfinals	(Czech Republic) Barbora Krejčíková / (Czech Republic) Kateřina Siniaková [3] vs (Canada) Gabriela Dabrowski / (Mexico) Giuliana Olmos [5]		Postponed
Mixed Doubles Quarterfinals	(United States) Caty McNally / (United States) William Blumberg [WC] vs (Latvia) Jeļena Ostapenko / (Spain) David Vega Hernández		Postponed
Mixed Doubles Quarterfinals	(Australia) Storm Sanders / (Australia) John Peers [4] vs (Canada) Leylah Fernandez / (United States) Jack Sock		Postponed
Colored background indicates a night match
Matches start at 12 pm (Arthur Ashe Stadium) and 11am (other courts), night session starts at 7pm Eastern Daylight Time (EDT)

== Day 10 (September 7) ==
The match between Jannik Sinner and Carlos Alcaraz became the latest ever finish in the history of the tournament, Alcaraz won the match at 2:50 am ET the following day, surpassed the previous record of 2:26 am three times. It was the second longest match in the tournament at 5 hours and 15 minutes.

- Seeds out:
  - Men's Singles: Andrey Rublev [9], (Italy) Jannik Sinner [11]
  - Women's Singles: (United States) Jessica Pegula [8], (Czech Republic) Karolína Plíšková [22]
  - Women's Doubles: (Canada) Gabriela Dabrowski / (Mexico) Giuliana Olmos [5], (United States) Desirae Krawczyk / (Netherlands) Demi Schuurs [6], (France) Caroline Garcia / (France) Kristina Mladenovic [14]
  - Mixed Doubles: (China) Zhang Shuai / (Croatia) Mate Pavić [2]
- Schedule of Play

Matches on main courts
Matches on Arthur Ashe Stadium
Event	Winner	Loser	Score
Women's Singles Quarterfinals	Aryna Sabalenka [6]	(Czech Republic) Karolína Plíšková [22]	6–1, 7–6^{(7–4)}
Men's Singles Quarterfinals	(United States) Frances Tiafoe [22]	Andrey Rublev [9]	7–6^{(7–3)}, 7–6^{(7–0)}, 6–4
Women's Singles Quarterfinals	(Poland) Iga Świątek [1]	(United States) Jessica Pegula [8]	6–3, 7–6^{(7–4)}
Men's Singles Quarterfinals	(Spain) Carlos Alcaraz [3]	(Italy) Jannik Sinner [11]	6–3, 6–7^{(7–9)}, 6–7^{(0–7)}, 7–5, 6–3
Matches on Louis Armstrong Stadium
Event	Winner	Loser	Score
Women's Doubles Quarterfinals	(Czech Republic) Barbora Krejčíková [3] (Czech Republic) Kateřina Siniaková [3]	(Canada) Gabriela Dabrowski [5] (Mexico) Giuliana Olmos [5]	6–3, 6–7^{(4–7)}, 6–3
Women's Doubles Quarterfinals	(United States) Caroline Dolehide [12] (Australia) Storm Sanders [12]	(France) Caroline Garcia [14] (France) Kristina Mladenovic [14]	6–3, 6–3
Women's Doubles Quarterfinals	(United States) Caty McNally (United States) Taylor Townsend	(United States) Desirae Krawczyk [6] (Netherlands) Demi Schuurs [6]	6–3, 6–1
Mixed Doubles Quarterfinals	(Australia) Storm Sanders [4] (Australia) John Peers [4]	(Canada) Leylah Fernandez (United States) Jack Sock	7–5, 7–6^{(7–3)}
Mixed Doubles Quarterfinals	(United States) Caty McNally [WC] (United States) William Blumberg [WC]	(Latvia) Jeļena Ostapenko (Spain) David Vega Hernández	7–6^{(10–8)}, 6–2
Matches on Grandstand
Event	Winner	Loser	Score
Wheelchair Men's Singles 1st Round	(Japan) Shingo Kunieda [1]	(Belgium) Joachim Gérard	6–3, 7–5
Wheelchair Women's Singles 1st Round	(Netherlands) Aniek van Koot [3]	(United States) Dana Mathewson	6–4, 6–3
Wheelchair Quad Singles Quarterfinals	(United States) David Wagner	(United Kingdom) Andy Lapthorne	4–6, 6–1, 6–2
Mixed Doubles Semifinals	(Belgium) Kirsten Flipkens [PR] (France) Édouard Roger-Vasselin [PR]	(China) Zhang Shuai [2] (Croatia) Mate Pavić [2]	6–4, 5–7, [10–6]
Colored background indicates a night match
Matches start at 12 pm (Arthur Ashe Stadium) and 11am (other courts), night session starts at 7pm Eastern Daylight Time (EDT)

== Day 11 (September 8) ==
The start of the women's singles match at Arthur Ashe Stadium was given a two-minute moment of silence for the death of British Queen Elizabeth II, who died at 10:10 am ET and a public announcement was made three hours later at 1:30 pm ET.

- Seeds out:
  - Women's Singles: Aryna Sabalenka [6], (France) Caroline Garcia [17]
  - Men's Doubles: (El Salvador) Marcelo Arévalo / (Netherlands) Jean-Julien Rojer [3], (Colombia) Juan Sebastián Cabal / (Colombia) Robert Farah [13]
  - Women's Doubles: (United States) Nicole Melichar-Martinez / (Australia) Ellen Perez [10]
- Schedule of Play

Matches on main courts
Matches on Arthur Ashe Stadium
Event	Winner	Loser	Score
Women's Singles Semifinals	(Tunisia) Ons Jabeur [5]	(France) Caroline Garcia [17]	6–1, 6–3
Women's Singles Semifinals	(Poland) Iga Świątek [1]	Aryna Sabalenka [6]	3–6, 6–1, 6–4
Matches on Louis Armstrong Stadium
Event	Winner	Loser	Score
Men's Doubles Semifinals	(United States) Rajeev Ram [1] (United Kingdom) Joe Salisbury [1]	(Colombia) Juan Sebastián Cabal [13] (Colombia) Robert Farah [13]	7–5, 4–6, 7–6^{(10–6)}
Men's Doubles Semifinals	(Netherlands) Wesley Koolhof [2] (United Kingdom) Neal Skupski [2]	(El Salvador) Marcelo Arévalo [3] (Netherlands) Jean-Julien Rojer [3]	6–4, 7–5
Mixed Doubles Semifinals	(Australia) Storm Sanders [4] (Australia) John Peers [4]	(United States) Caty McNally [WC] (United States) William Blumberg [WC]	6–2, 6–7^{(5–7)}, [10–8]
Women's Doubles Semifinals	(Czech Republic) Barbora Krejčíková [3] (Czech Republic) Kateřina Siniaková [3]	(United States) Nicole Melichar-Martinez [10] (Australia) Ellen Perez [10]	6–3, 6–7^{(4–7)}, 6–3
Colored background indicates a night match
Matches start at 12 pm, night session at Arthur Ashe Stadium starts at 7 pm Eastern Daylight Time (EDT)

== Day 12 (September 9) ==
- Seeds out:
  - Men's Singles: (United States) Frances Tiafoe [22], Karen Khachanov [27]
  - Men's Doubles: (Netherlands) Wesley Koolhof / (United Kingdom) Neal Skupski [2]
  - Women's Doubles: (United States) Caroline Dolehide / (Australia) Storm Sanders [12]
- Schedule of Play

Matches on main courts
Matches on Arthur Ashe Stadium
Event	Winner	Loser	Score
Men's Doubles Final	(United States) Rajeev Ram [1] (United Kingdom) Joe Salisbury [1]	(Netherlands) Wesley Koolhof [2] (United Kingdom) Neal Skupski [2]	7–6^{(7–4)}, 7–5
Men's Singles Semifinals	(Norway) Casper Ruud [5]	Karen Khachanov [27]	7–6^{(7–5)}, 6–2, 5–7, 6–2
Men's Singles Semifinals	(Spain) Carlos Alcaraz [3]	(United States) Frances Tiafoe [22]	6–7^{(6–8)}, 6–3, 6–1, 6–7^{(5–7)}, 6–3
Matches on Louis Armstrong Stadium
Event	Winner	Loser	Score
Wheelchair Men's Singles Semifinals	(Japan) Shingo Kunieda [1]	(Japan) Takuya Miki	6–1, 6–2
Women's Doubles Semifinals	(United States) Caty McNally (United States) Taylor Townsend	(United States) Caroline Dolehide [12] (Australia) Storm Sanders [12]	1–6, 6–3, 6–3
Wheelchair Men's Doubles Semifinals	(United Kingdom) Alfie Hewett [1] (United Kingdom) Gordon Reid [1]	(Chile) Alexander Cataldo (Japan) Tokito Oda	6–3, 6–3
Wheelchair Women's Doubles Semifinals	(Netherlands) Diede de Groot [1] (Netherlands) Aniek van Koot [1]	(Japan) Manami Tanaka (China) Zhu Zhenzhen	6–0, 6–1
Colored background indicates a night match
Matches start at 12 pm, night session at Arthur Ashe Stadium starts at 7 pm Eastern Daylight Time (EDT)

== Day 13 (September 10) ==
- Seeds out:
  - Women's Singles: (Tunisia) Ons Jabeur [5]
- Schedule of Play

Matches on main courts
Matches on Arthur Ashe Stadium
Event	Winner	Loser	Score
Mixed Doubles Final	(Australia) Storm Sanders [4] (Australia) John Peers [4]	(Belgium) Kirsten Flipkens [PR] (France) Édouard Roger-Vasselin [PR]	4–6, 6–4, [10–7]
Women's Singles Final	(Poland) Iga Świątek [1]	(Tunisia) Ons Jabeur [5]	6–2, 7–6^{(7–5)}
Matches on Louis Armstrong Stadium
Event	Winner	Loser	Score
Wheelchair Men's Doubles Final	(Spain) Martín de la Puente (France) Nicolas Peifer	(United Kingdom) Alfie Hewett [1] (United Kingdom) Gordon Reid [1]	4–6, 7–5, [10–6]
Wheelchair Quad Doubles Final	(Netherlands) Sam Schröder [1] (Netherlands) Niels Vink [1]	(Canada) Robert Shaw [2] (United States) David Wagner [2]	6–1, 6–2
Wheelchair Women's Doubles Final	(Netherlands) Diede de Groot [1] (Netherlands) Aniek van Koot [1]	(Japan) Yui Kamiji [2] (South Africa) Kgothatso Montjane [2]	6–2, 6–2
Matches start at 12 pm Eastern Daylight Time (EDT)

== Day 14 (September 11) ==
Barbora Krejčíková and Kateřina Siniaková became the first team to complete the elusive Super Slam by winning all four majors, the Olympics and the WTA Finals.

- Seeds out:
  - Men Singles: (Norway) Casper Ruud [5]
- Schedule of Play

Matches on main courts
Matches on Arthur Ashe Stadium
Event	Winner	Loser	Score
Women's Doubles Final	(Czech Republic) Barbora Krejčíková [3] (Czech Republic) Kateřina Siniaková [3]	(United States) Caty McNally (United States) Taylor Townsend	3–6, 7–5, 6–1
Men's Singles Final	(Spain) Carlos Alcaraz [3]	(Norway) Casper Ruud [5]	6–4, 2–6, 7–6^{(7–1)}, 6–3
Matches on Louis Armstrong Stadium
Event	Winner	Loser	Score
Wheelchair Men's Singles Final	(United Kingdom) Alfie Hewett [2]	(Japan) Shingo Kunieda [1]	7–6^{(7–2)}, 6–1
Wheelchair Women's Singles Final	(Netherlands) Diede de Groot [1]	(Japan) Yui Kamiji [2]	3–6, 6–1, 6–1
Matches start at 12 pm Eastern Daylight Time (EDT)
