= Pauline Déroulède =

French wheelchair tennis player

- Born: 30 December 1990 (age 35) Boulogne-Billancourt, Paris, France
- Plays: Right-handed (one-handed backhand)

Singles
- Career record: 82-59
- Career titles: 4
- Highest ranking: No. 13 (12 June 2023)
- Current ranking: No. 20 (1 July 2024)

Grand Slam singles results
- Australian Open: 1R (2024)
- French Open: QF (2023)
- US Open: 1R (2022, 2023)

Doubles
- Career record: 74-44
- Career titles: 15
- Highest ranking: No. 11 (11 July 2022)
- Current ranking: No. 17 (1 July 2024)

Grand Slam doubles results
- Australian Open: QF (2024)
- French Open: SF (2023)
- US Open: QF (2022, 2023)

Pauline Déroulède (born 30 December 1990) is a French wheelchair tennis player, she was 2023 French Open wheelchair singles quarterfinalist and 2023 French Open wheelchair doubles semi-finalist with Katharina Krüger. Her highest world ranking is world number 17 in singles and world number 11 in doubles. She competed in women's wheelchair tennis singles and doubles at the 2024 Summer Paralympics in Paris, France.

== Personal life ==
Déroulède started playing tennis when she was eight years old.

On 27 October 2018, Déroulède sitting on a stationary scooter at Rue de la Convention in Paris while she was waiting for her girlfriend, Typhaine, who was working in a florist. Pauline and two other pedestrians were struck by an elderly driver who had lost control of their vehicle, the 92-year-old driver claimed to have had confusion over the accelerator and brake pedals. She lost her leg in the accident, the two other pedestrians had also got severely injured: a 33-year-old man was in a coma while a 27-year-old woman also had a leg injury. Déroulède has campaigned to introduce mandatory medical tests to ensure elderly drivers are fit to drive.

Déroulède is a descendent of French novelist Paul Déroulède.

Déroulède is openly lesbian.
