= Eleana Yu =

American tennis player (born 2004)

- Yu with the NCAA Super Regional Championship trophy
- Country (sports): United States
- Residence: Mason, Ohio, United States
- Born: November 8, 2004 (age 21)
- Prize money: US$ 91,615

Singles
- Career titles: 0
- Highest ranking: No. 646 (January 9, 2023)
- Current ranking: No. 647 (January 16, 2023)

Grand Slam singles results
- US Open: 1R (2022)

Doubles
- Career titles: 0
- Highest ranking: 935 (April 11, 2022)

Grand Slam doubles results
- US Open Junior: QF (2022)
- Last updated on: January 16, 2023.

Eleana Yu (born November 8, 2004) is an American tennis player. Yu has a career-high WTA singles ranking of No. 646 achieved on January 9, 2023, and a career-high doubles ranking of 935, achieved on April 11, 2022.

== Early life ==
Eleana was born in Mason, Ohio to parents Chao Yu and Wei Lu.

== Career ==
=== 2021 ===
In 2021, she received a wildcard into the main draw of the LTP Tennis $60K 2021, an ITF tournament with $60,000 in prize money. However, she lost in the first round to Alycia Parks 3–6, 6–3, 3–6. She subsequently received a wildcard into the qualifying rounds of the Tennis in the Land 2021, a WTA Tour event. She also lost in the first round, this time to Nagi Hanatani 3–6, 6–2, 2–6.

=== 2022: Grand Slam debut ===
At just 16-years-old, Yu won the USTA Girls 18s National Championships defeating Valerie Glozman 6-3, 7-5. This earned her a wildcard into the main draw of the 2022 US Open. She lost in the first round to Alison Riske-Amritraj.
