= 2022 US Open – Girls' singles =

Girls' singles
- 2022 US Open

Final
- Champion: (Philippines) Alexandra Eala
- Runner-up: (Czech Republic) Lucie Havlíčková
- Score: 6–2, 6–4

Events
Singles	men	women		boys	girls
Doubles	men	women	mixed	boys	girls
WC Singles	men	women	quad
WC Doubles	men	women	quad
Legends	men	women	mixed
- US Open

Alexandra Eala defeated Lucie Havlíčková in the final, 6–2, 6–4 to win the girls' singles tennis title at the 2022 US Open. Eala became the first Filipino player to win a major girls' title, and the first Southeast Asian player to do so since Angelique Widjaja at the 2002 French Open. Eala was the first player to win the title without losing a set throughout the tournament since Amanda Anisimova at the 2017 US Open.

Robin Montgomery was the reigning champion, but chose not to participate.

== Seeds ==
1. (Belgium) Sofia Costoulas (third round)
2. (Czech Republic) Lucie Havlíčková (final)
3. (United States) Liv Hovde (second round)
4. (Switzerland) Céline Naef (quarterfinals)
5. (Argentina) Solana Sierra (second round)
6. (Slovakia) Nikola Daubnerová (first round)
7. Diana Shnaider (semifinals)
8. (Australia) Taylah Preston (third round)
9. (Canada) Victoria Mboko (semifinals)
10. (Philippines) Alexandra Eala (champion)
11. (Hungary) Luca Udvardy (second round)
12. (Japan) Sara Saito (first round)
13. (Denmark) Johanne Svendsen (second round)
14. Mirra Andreeva (quarterfinals)
15. Ksenia Zaytseva (first round)
16. (United States) Qavia Lopez (first round)

== Main draw ==
Key

- Q = Qualifier
- WC = Wild card
- LL = Lucky loser
- Alt = Alternate
- ITF = ITF entry
- PR = Protected ranking
- SR = Special ranking
- SE = Special exempt
- JE = Junior exempt
- JR = Junior Accelerator Programme entrant
- CO = College Accelerator Programme entrant
- NG = Next Gen Accelerator Program entrant
- w/o = Walkover
- r = Retired
- d = Defaulted

=== Finals ===
Quarterfinals
14	Mirra Andreeva	4	0
10	(Philippines) Alexandra Eala	6	6
4	(Switzerland) Céline Naef	5	6	5
9	(Canada) Victoria Mboko	7	2	7
7	Diana Shnaider	6	6
(United Kingdom) Ranah Stoiber	4	3
(United States) Clervie Ngounoue	4	2
2	(Czech Republic) Lucie Havlíčková	6	6

Semifinals
10	(Philippines) Alexandra Eala	6	7^{7}
9	(Canada) Victoria Mboko	1	6^{5}
7	Diana Shnaider	4	4
2	(Czech Republic) Lucie Havlíčková	6	6

Final
10	(Philippines) Alexandra Eala	6	6
2	(Czech Republic) Lucie Havlíčková	2	4

=== Top half ===
==== Section 1 ====
First round
1	(Belgium) Sofia Costoulas	6	6
(Peru) Lucciana Pérez Alarcón	2	0
(France) Yaroslava Bartashevich	5	3
WC	(United States) Valerie Glozman	7	6
(United Kingdom) Ella McDonald	7	6
WC	(United States) Eleana Yu	5	3
(Japan) Hayu Kinoshita	2	1
14	Mirra Andreeva	6	6
10	(Philippines) Alex Eala	6	6
(Canada) Annabelle Xu	3	0
(United States) Mia Slama	0	6^{5}
(Slovakia) Nina Vargová	6	7^{7}
(Germany) Carolina Kuhl	6^{6}	5
(Kenya) Angella Okutoyi	7^{8}	7
WC	(United States) Alyssa Ahn	0	6	1
8	(Australia) Taylah Preston	6	3	6

Second round
1	(Belgium) S Costoulas	3	6	6
WC	(United States) V Glozman	6	2	2
(United Kingdom) E McDonald	7^{9}	3	3
14	M Andreeva	6^{7}	6	6
10	(Philippines) A Eala	6	6
(Slovakia) N Vargová	2	3
(Kenya) A Okutoyi	2	7^{7}	1
8	(Australia) T Preston	6	6^{4}	6

Third round
1	(Belgium) S Costoulas	7	4	1
14	M Andreeva	5	6	6
10	(Philippines) A Eala	6	7^{7}
8	(Australia) T Preston	2	6^{1}

Quarterfinals
14	M Andreeva	4	0
10	(Philippines) A Eala	6	6

==== Section 2 ====
First round
4	(Switzerland) Céline Naef	6	6
(United States) Sonya Macavei	4	1
(Spain) Raquel González Vilar	2	6	6
Q	(Slovakia) Renáta Jamrichová	6	3	4
(Bulgaria) Denislava Glushkova	1	4
Anastasiia Gureva	6	6
(Ukraine) Anastasiya Lopata	6	6
16	(United States) Qavia Lopez	3	3
9	(Canada) Victoria Mboko	6	6
(United States) Kaitlin Quevedo	4	2
Q	(Denmark) Rebecca Munk Mortensen	5	6	6
(Italy) Georgia Pedone	7	1	3
(Japan) Sayaka Ishii	4	2
WC	(United States) Iva Jovic	6	6
SE	(Poland) Malwina Rowińska	2	2
5	(Argentina) Solana Sierra	6	6

Second round
4	(Switzerland) C Naef	6	6
(Spain) R González Vilar	0	1
A Gureva	6	6
(Ukraine) A Lopata	1	0
9	(Canada) V Mboko	6	6
Q	(Denmark) R Munk Mortensen	4	3
WC	(United States) I Jovic	7	2	7^{11}
5	(Argentina) S Sierra	5	6	6^{9}

Third round
4	(Switzerland) C Naef	6	2	6
A Gureva	2	6	2
9	(Canada) V Mboko	6	6
WC	(United States) I Jovic	2	2

Quarterfinals
4	(Switzerland) C Naef	5	6	5
9	(Canada) V Mboko	7	2	7

=== Bottom half ===
==== Section 3 ====
First round
7	Diana Shnaider	6	6
Q	(Turkey) Melisa Ercan	3	3
(Belgium) Amelie Van Impe	2	6	7
(United States) Alexis Blokhina	6	4	5
WC	(United States) Capucine Jauffret	2	2
Q	(Poland) Weronika Ewald	6	6
(Slovakia) Irina Balus	1	3
11	(Hungary) Luca Udvardy	6	6
13	(Denmark) Johanne Svendsen	6	7
WC	(United States) Katherine Hui	3	5
(Australia) Charlotte Kempenaers-Pocz	2	6	5
(Canada) Kayla Cross	6	3	7
(United Kingdom) Ranah Stoiber	5	6	6
SE	(Italy) Federica Urgesi	7	3	4
Q	(Kazakhstan) Aruzhan Sagandikova	1	3
3	(United States) Liv Hovde	6	6

Second round
7	D Shnaider	6	6
(Belgium) A Van Impe	2	3
Q	(Poland) W Ewald	7	6
11	(Hungary) L Udvardy	5	4
13	(Denmark) J Svendsen	4	6	1
(Canada) K Cross	6	3	6
(United Kingdom) RA Stoiber	6	2	6
3	(United States) L Hovde	3	6	4

Third round
7	D Shnaider	2	6	6
Q	(Poland) W Ewald	6	4	2
(Canada) K Cross	6^{2}	0
(United Kingdom) RA Stoiber	7^{7}	6

Quarterfinals
7	D Shnaider	6	6
(United Kingdom) RA Stoiber	4	3

==== Section 4 ====
First round
6	(Slovakia) Nikola Daubnerová	6	3	1
(United States) Clervie Ngounoue	3	6	6
(Belgium) Amelia Waligora	1	4
Q	(United States) Tatum Evans	6	6
(Germany) Ella Seidel	6	6
WC	(United States) Shannon Lam	0	0
Ekaterina Khayrutdinova	2	6	6
12	(Japan) Sara Saito	6	3	4
15	Ksenia Zaytseva	5	3
(Canada) Mia Kupres	7	6
WC	(United States) Ariana Pursoo	6	3	6
(Thailand) Lanlana Tararudee	4	6	2
WC	(France) Sarah Iliev	3	6	6
(Argentina) Luciana Moyano	6	0	0
Q	(United States) Alanis Hamilton	3	4
2	(Czech Republic) Lucie Havlíčková	6	6

Second round
(United States) C Ngounoue	6	6
Q	(United States) T Evans	1	4
(Germany) E Seidel	3	1
E Khayrutdinova	6	6
(Canada) M Kupres	6	6
WC	(United States) A Pursoo	2	2
WC	(France) S Iliev	6	1	3
2	(Czech Republic) L Havlíčková	3	6	6

Third round
(United States) C Ngounoue	6	6
E Khayrutdinova	2	3
(Canada) M Kupres	2	6^{9}
2	(Czech Republic) L Havlíčková	6	7^{11}

Quarterfinals
(United States) C Ngounoue	4	2
2	(Czech Republic) L Havlíčková	6	6

== Qualifying ==
=== Seeds ===
1. (Kazakhstan) Aruzhan Sagandikova (qualified)
2. (Chinese Taipei) Li Yu-yun (first round)
3. (Turkey) Melisa Ercan (qualified)
4. (Kazakhstan) Sandugash Kenzhibayeva (qualifying competition)
5. (Morocco) Malak El Allami (first round)
6. (Turkey) Ayşegül Mert (qualifying competition)
7. (United States) Ava Krug (first round)
8. (Slovakia) Renáta Jamrichová (qualified)
9. (Poland) Olivia Lincer (qualifying competition)
10. (United States) Ahmani Guichard (qualifying competition)
11. (Poland) Weronika Ewald (qualified)
12. (United States) Theadora Rabman (first round)
13. (Czech Republic) Amélie Šmejkalová (first round)
14. (Slovenia) Ela Nala Milić (first round)
15. (Switzerland) Chelsea Fontenel (first round)
16. (Poland) Ada Piestrzyńska (first round)

=== Qualifiers ===
1. (Kazakhstan) Aruzhan Sagandikova
2. (United States) Alanis Hamilton
3. (Turkey) Melisa Ercan
4. (Poland) Weronika Ewald
5. (United States) Katherine Hui
6. (United States) Tatum Evans
7. (Denmark) Rebecca Munk Mortensen
8. (Slovakia) Renáta Jamrichová

=== Draw ===
==== First qualifier ====
First round
1	(Kazakhstan) Aruzhan Sagandikova	6	3	[10]
WC	(Japan) Haruka Hasegawa	4	6	[7]
WC	(United States) Julieta Pareja	6	7^{7}
16	(Poland) Ada Piestrzyńska	4	6^{4}

Qualifying competition
1	(Kazakhstan) Aruzhan Sagandikova	6	6
WC	(United States) Julieta Pareja	2	3

==== Second qualifier ====
First round
2	(Chinese Taipei) Li Yu-yun	1	6	[5]
WC	(United States) Alanis Hamilton	6	3	[10]
(Denmark) Natacha Schou	6^{1}	6	[11]
12	(United States) Theadora Rabman	7^{7}	0	[9]

Qualifying competition
WC	(United States) Alanis Hamilton	7^{8}	7^{7}
(Denmark) Natacha Schou	6^{6}	6^{2}

==== Third qualifier ====
First round
3	(Turkey) Melisa Ercan	6	7
(Canada) Ellie Daniels	4	5
WC	(United States) Akasha Urhobo	2	3
9	(Poland) Olivia Lincer	6	6

Qualifying competition
3	(Turkey) Melisa Ercan	6	6
9	(Poland) Olivia Lincer	4	1

==== Fourth qualifier ====
First round
4	(Kazakhstan) Sandugash Kenzhibayeva	7^{8}	6
(Netherlands) Rose Marie Nijkamp	6^{6}	2
WC	(United States) Christasha McNeil	1	1
11	(Poland) Weronika Ewald	6	6

Qualifying competition
4	(Kazakhstan) Sandugash Kenzhibayeva	6	0	[7]
11	(Poland) Weronika Ewald	4	6	[10]

==== Fifth qualifier ====
First round
5	(Morocco) Malak El Allami	1	6^{5}
WC	(United States) Katherine Hui	6	7^{7}
(Paraguay) Leyla Fiorella Brítez Risso	6^{5}	2
10	(United States) Ahmani Guichard	7^{7}	6

Qualifying competition
WC	(United States) Katherine Hui	6	6
10	(United States) Ahmani Guichard	3	4

==== Sixth qualifier ====
First round
6	(Turkey) Ayşegül Mert	7^{7}	7
(United States) Valeria Ray	6^{4}	5
(United States) Tatum Evans	6	6
14	(Slovenia) Ela Nala Milić	3	4

Qualifying competition
6	(Turkey) Ayşegül Mert	2	6^{6}
(United States) Tatum Evans	6	7^{8}

==== Seventh qualifier ====
First round
7	(United States) Ava Krug	0	4
(Denmark) Rebecca Munk Mortensen	6	6
(Netherlands) Isis Louise van den Broek	2	6	[10]
15	(Switzerland) Chelsea Fontenel	6	4	[8]

Qualifying competition
(Denmark) Rebecca Munk Mortensen	7	6
(Netherlands) Isis Louise van den Broek	5	1

==== Eighth qualifier ====
First round
8	(Slovakia) Renáta Jamrichová	6^{5}	6	[10]
(South Africa) Gabriella Broadfoot	7^{7}	2	[4]
(Ecuador) Tania Isabel Andrade Sabando	4	7	[10]
13	(Czech Republic) Amélie Šmejkalová	6	5	[7]

Qualifying competition
8	(Slovakia) Renáta Jamrichová	6	6
(Ecuador) Tania Isabel Andrade Sabando	4	1
