= 2022 US Open – Boys' doubles =

Boys' doubles
- 2022 US Open

Final
- Champions: (United States) Ozan Baris (United States) Nishesh Basavareddy
- Runners-up: (Switzerland) Dylan Dietrich (Bolivia) Juan Carlos Prado Ángelo
- Score: 6–1, 6–1

Events
Singles	men	women		boys	girls
Doubles	men	women	mixed	boys	girls
WC Singles	men	women	quad
WC Doubles	men	women	quad
Legends	men	women	mixed
- US Open

Max Westphal and Coleman Wong were the reigning champions, but Westphal was no longer eligible to participate in junior events. Wong partnered Edas Butvilas, but lost in the first round to Aidan Kim and Learner Tien.

Ozan Baris and Nishesh Basavareddy won the title, defeating Dylan Dietrich and Juan Carlos Prado Ángelo in the final, 6–1, 6–1.

== Seeds ==
1. (Lithuania) Edas Butvilas / (Hong Kong) Coleman Wong (first round)
2. (Peru) Gonzalo Bueno / (Peru) Ignacio Buse (semifinals)
3. (Spain) Martín Landaluce / (Spain) Pedro Ródenas (quarterfinals)
4. (Czech Republic) Hynek Bartoň / (Czech Republic) Jakub Nicod (first round)
5. (Belgium) Gilles-Arnaud Bailly / (Belgium) Alexander Blockx (second round)
6. (Paraguay) Daniel Vallejo / (Paraguay) Martín Antonio Vergara del Puerto (first round)
7. (United States) Nicholas Godsick / (Canada) Jaden Weekes (withdrew)
8. (United States) Ozan Baris / (United States) Nishesh Basavareddy (champions)

== Draw ==
Key

- Q = Qualifier
- WC = Wild card
- LL = Lucky loser
- Alt = Alternate
- ITF = ITF entry
- PR = Protected ranking
- SR = Special ranking
- SE = Special exempt
- JE = Junior exempt
- JR = Junior Accelerator Programme entrant
- CO = College Accelerator Programme entrant
- NG = Next Gen Accelerator Program entrant
- w/o = Walkover
- r = Retired
- d = Defaulted

=== Finals ===
Semifinals
(Switzerland) Dylan Dietrich (Bolivia) Juan Carlos Prado Ángelo	6^{9}	7^{7}	[10]
(New Zealand) Jack Loutit (United Kingdom) Matthew Rankin	7^{11}	6^{2}	[8]
8	(United States) Ozan Baris (United States) Nishesh Basavareddy	6	7^{7}
2	(Peru) Gonzalo Bueno (Peru) Ignacio Buse	0	6^{4}

Final
(Switzerland) Dylan Dietrich (Bolivia) Juan Carlos Prado Ángelo	1	1
8	(United States) Ozan Baris (United States) Nishesh Basavareddy	6	6

=== Top half ===
First round
1	(Lithuania) Edas Butvilas (Hong Kong) Coleman Wong	7^{7}	4	[8]
(United States) Aidan Kim (United States) Learner Tien	6^{5}	6	[10]
(Cyprus) Constantinos Koshis (Namibia) Connor Henry van Schalkwyk	6	6^{3}	[7]
(Switzerland) Dylan Dietrich (Bolivia) Juan Carlos Prado Ángelo	4	7^{7}	[10]
(United States) Leanid Boika; Yaroslav Demin	6	4	[10]
(United States) Kyle Kang (United States) Alex Michelsen	3	6	[5]
(Argentina) Juan Manuel La Serna (Argentina) Lautaro Midón	4	4
5	(Belgium) Gilles-Arnaud Bailly (Belgium) Alexander Blockx	6	6
4	(Czech Republic) Hynek Bartoň (Czech Republic) Jakub Nicod	3	7^{7}	[9]
(Slovakia) Peter Naď (Slovakia) Peter Benjamín Privara	6	6^{4}	[11]
(United States) Alexander Frusina (United States) Alexander Razeghi	6^{5}	6	[8]
(New Zealand) Jack Loutit (United Kingdom) Matthew Rankin	7^{7}	3	[10]
(Switzerland) Kilian Feldbausch (Poland) Olaf Pieczkowski	3	6	[10]
(France) Paul Barbier Gazeu (Belgium) Alessio Basile	6	2	[6]
WC	(United States) Sean Daryabeigi (United States) Jelani Sarr	2	6	[5]
Alt	(United States) Kaylan Bigun (United States) Meecah Bigun	6	3	[10]

Second round
(United States) A Kim (United States) L Tien	4	6	[9]
(Switzerland) D Dietrich (Bolivia) JC Prado Ángelo	6	0	[11]
(United States) L Boika; Y Demin	4	7^{8}	[10]
5	(Belgium) G-A Bailly (Belgium) A Blockx	6	6^{6}	[2]
(Slovakia) P Naď (Slovakia) PB Privara
(New Zealand) J Loutit (United Kingdom) M Rankin	w/o
(Switzerland) K Feldbausch (Poland) O Pieczkowski	3	6	[8]
Alt	(United States) K Bigun (United States) M Bigun	6	3	[10]

Quarterfinals
(Switzerland) D Dietrich (Bolivia) JC Prado Ángelo	6	4	[10]
(United States) L Boika; Y Demin	4	6	[8]
(New Zealand) J Loutit (United Kingdom) M Rankin	3	6	[10]
Alt	(United States) K Bigun (United States) M Bigun	6	4	[7]

Semifinals
(Switzerland) D Dietrich (Bolivia) JC Prado Ángelo	6^{9}	7^{7}	[10]
(New Zealand) J Loutit (United Kingdom) M Rankin	7^{11}	6^{2}	[8]

=== Bottom half ===
First round
8	(United States) Ozan Baris (United States) Nishesh Basavareddy	6	6
(Peru) Gianluca Ballotta (United States) Jonah Braswell	1	3
(United Kingdom) Patrick Brady (United Kingdom) William Jansen	7	6
(Turkey) Togan Tokaç (Australia) Edward Winter	5	1
(France) Paul Inchauspé (United States) Cooper Williams	7^{7}	6
(South Korea) Gerard Campaña Lee (Australia) Jeremy Jin	6^{3}	1
WC	(United States) Mitchell Lee (United States) Cooper Woestendick	6^{9}	0
3	(Spain) Martín Landaluce (Spain) Pedro Ródenas	7^{11}	6
6	(Paraguay) Daniel Vallejo (Paraguay) Martín Antonio Vergara del Puerto	3	7^{7}	[11]
(Thailand) Tanapatt Nirundorn (United States) Michael Zheng	6	6^{5}	[13]
(France) Arthur Géa (Poland) Borys Zgoła
WC	(United States) Darwin Blanch (United States) Stiles Brockett	w/o
WC	(United States) Bryce Nakashima (United States) Hudson Rivera	6	4	[10]
(Romania) Mihai Alexandru Coman (Japan) Hayato Matsuoka	2	6	[3]
(Brazil) João Fonseca (Japan) Rei Sakamoto	4	6^{8}
2	(Peru) Gonzalo Bueno (Peru) Ignacio Buse	6	7^{10}

Second round
8	(United States) O Baris (United States) N Basavareddy	5	7	[10]
(United Kingdom) P Brady (United Kingdom) W Jansen	7	5	[6]
(France) P Inchauspé (United States) C Williams	6	1	[8]
3	(Spain) M Landaluce (Spain) P Ródenas	3	6	[10]
(Thailand) T Nirundorn (United States) M Zheng	6	6
WC	(United States) Dar Blanch (United States) S Brockett	1	4
WC	(United States) B Nakashima (United States) H Rivera	1	3
2	(Peru) G Bueno (Peru) I Buse	6	6

Quarterfinals
8	(United States) O Baris (United States) N Basavareddy	6	7^{7}
3	(Spain) M Landaluce (Spain) P Ródenas	3	6^{3}
(Thailand) T Nirundorn (United States) M Zheng	6^{5}	4
2	(Peru) G Bueno (Peru) I Buse	7^{7}	6

Semifinals
8	(United States) O Baris (United States) N Basavareddy	6	7^{7}
2	(Peru) G Bueno (Peru) I Buse	0	6^{4}
