= 2022 US Open – Boys' singles =

Boys' singles
- 2022 US Open

Final
- Champion: (Spain) Martín Landaluce
- Runner-up: (Belgium) Gilles-Arnaud Bailly
- Score: 7–6^{(7–3)}, 5–7, 6–2

Events
Singles	men	women		boys	girls
Doubles	men	women	mixed	boys	girls
WC Singles	men	women	quad
WC Doubles	men	women	quad
Legends	men	women	mixed
- US Open

Daniel Rincón was the reigning champion, but is no longer eligible to participate in junior events.

Martín Landaluce won the title, defeating Gilles-Arnaud Bailly in the final, 7–6^{(7–3)}, 5–7, 6–2.

== Seeds ==
1. (Paraguay) Daniel Vallejo (semifinals)
2. (Belgium) Gilles-Arnaud Bailly (final)
3. (Switzerland) Kilian Feldbausch (quarterfinals)
4. (United States) Nishesh Basavareddy (second round)
5. (Spain) Martín Landaluce (champion)
6. (Argentina) Lautaro Midón (second round)
7. (Peru) Gonzalo Bueno (third round)
8. (Lithuania) Edas Butvilas (second round)
9. (Hong Kong) Coleman Wong (semifinals)
10. (Poland) Martyn Pawelski (second round)
11. (Czech Republic) Jakub Nicod (second round)
12. (Peru) Ignacio Buse (first round)
13. (South Korea) Gerard Campaña Lee (third round)
14. Yaroslav Demin (third round)
15. (Canada) Jaden Weekes (first round)
16. (United States) Michael Zheng (third round)

== Main draw ==
Key

- Q = Qualifier
- WC = Wild card
- LL = Lucky loser
- Alt = Alternate
- ITF = ITF entry
- PR = Protected ranking
- SR = Special ranking
- SE = Special exempt
- JE = Junior exempt
- JR = Junior Accelerator Programme entrant
- CO = College Accelerator Programme entrant
- NG = Next Gen Accelerator Program entrant
- w/o = Walkover
- r = Retired
- d = Defaulted

=== Finals ===
Quarterfinals
1	(Paraguay) Daniel Vallejo	6	6
(Czech Republic) Hynek Bartoň	4	2
(Belgium) Alexander Blockx	1	6	2
5	(Spain) Martín Landaluce	6	3	6
9	(Hong Kong) Coleman Wong	6	6^{4}	6
3	(Switzerland) Kilian Feldbausch	2	7^{7}	4
WC	(United States) Kyle Kang	4	6	1
2	(Belgium) Gilles-Arnaud Bailly	6	3	6

Semifinals
1	(Paraguay) Daniel Vallejo	3	2
5	(Spain) Martín Landaluce	6	6
9	(Hong Kong) Coleman Wong	6	3	3
2	(Belgium) Gilles-Arnaud Bailly	3	6	6

Final
5	(Spain) Martín Landaluce	7^{7}	5	6
2	(Belgium) Gilles-Arnaud Bailly	6^{3}	7	2

=== Top half ===
==== Section 1 ====
First round
1	(Paraguay) Daniel Vallejo	6	6
WC	(United States) Kaylan Bigun	2	2
Q	(United States) Sean Daryabeigi	1	1
(France) Paul Inchauspé	6	6
LL	(United States) Calvin Baierl	1	6^{4}
(Japan) Rei Sakamoto	6	7^{7}
(Belgium) Alessio Basile	6	2	3
13	(South Korea) Gerard Campaña Lee	3	6	6
10	(Poland) Martyn Pawelski	7^{7}	4	6
Q	(Turkey) Togan Tokaç	6^{3}	6	1
(United States) Alex Michelsen	6	6
(Thailand) Tanapatt Nirundorn	1	3
(Czech Republic) Hynek Bartoň	2	6	6
(United States) Cooper Williams	6	4	3
(Romania) Mihai Alexandru Coman	2	4
8	(Lithuania) Edas Butvilas	6	6

Second round
1	(Paraguay) D Vallejo	6	4	6
(France) P Inchauspé	4	6	1
(Japan) R Sakamoto	4	6^{5}
13	(South Korea) G Campaña Lee	6	7^{7}
10	(Poland) M Pawelski	3	6	5
(United States) A Michelsen	6	1	7
(Czech Republic) H Bartoň	7^{9}	4	6
8	(Lithuania) E Butvilas	6^{7}	6	3

Third round
1	(Paraguay) D Vallejo	7	6
13	(South Korea) G Campaña Lee	5	4
(United States) A Michelsen	6^{4}	3
(Czech Republic) H Bartoň	7^{7}	6

Quarterfinals
1	(Paraguay) D Vallejo	6	6
(Czech Republic) H Bartoň	4	2

==== Section 2 ====
First round
4	(United States) Nishesh Basavareddy	6	7^{7}
(Switzerland) Dylan Dietrich	3	6^{2}
Q	(Australia) Edward Winter	2	4
(Belgium) Alexander Blockx	6	6
WC	(United States) Bryce Nakashima	5	2
(Argentina) Juan Manuel La Serna	7	6
(France) Arthur Géa	7^{7}	4	7
15	(Canada) Jaden Weekes	6^{3}	6	5
12	(Peru) Ignacio Buse	5	4
(Slovakia) Peter Benjamín Privara	7	6
WC	(United States) Leanid Boika	4	4
(Namibia) Connor Henry van Schalkwyk	6	6
WC	(United States) Jonah Braswell	4	6^{5}
Q	(United Kingdom) Patrick Brady	6	7^{7}
Q	(United States) Hudson Rivera	6^{4}	3
5	(Spain) Martín Landaluce	7^{7}	6

Second round
4	(United States) N Basavareddy	2	1
(Belgium) A Blockx	6	6
(Argentina) JM La Serna	3	1
(France) A Géa	6	6
(Slovakia) PB Privara	7	6
(Namibia) CH van Schalkwyk	5	3
Q	(United Kingdom) P Brady	4	4
5	(Spain) M Landaluce	6	6

Third round
(Belgium) A Blockx	6^{5}	6	3
(France) A Géa	7^{7}	1	1^{r}
(Slovakia) PB Privara	5	6	5
5	(Spain) M Landaluce	7	3	7

Quarterfinals
(Belgium) A Blockx	1	6	2
5	(Spain) M Landaluce	6	3	6

=== Bottom half ===
==== Section 3 ====
First round
7	(Peru) Gonzalo Bueno	7	6
WC	(United States) Jelani Sarr	5	4
SE	(New Zealand) Jack Loutit	7	6
(United States) Alexander Frusina	5	3
(Japan) Hayato Matsuoka	0	1
(United States) Aidan Kim	6	6
(Paraguay) Martín Antonio Vergara del Puerto	3	2
9	(Hong Kong) Coleman Wong	6	6
16	(United States) Michael Zheng	6	6
Q	(Poland) Borys Zgoła	4	4
Q	(United Kingdom) William Jansen	6	6
(Australia) Jeremy Jin	1	3
Q	(Cyprus) Constantinos Koshis	3	4
(United States) Ozan Baris	6	6
(Bolivia) Juan Carlos Prado Ángelo	1	4
3	(Switzerland) Kilian Feldbausch	6	6

Second round
7	(Peru) G Bueno	6	3	7
SE	(New Zealand) J Loutit	3	6	5
(United States) A Kim	6	3	3
9	(Hong Kong) C Wong	4	6	6
16	(United States) M Zheng	6	7
Q	(United Kingdom) W Jansen	2	5
(United States) O Baris	4	3
3	(Switzerland) K Feldbausch	6	6

Third round
7	(Peru) G Bueno	6^{5}	2
9	(Hong Kong) C Wong	7^{7}	6
16	(United States) M Zheng	6^{5}	6	4
3	(Switzerland) K Feldbausch	7^{7}	4	6

Quarterfinals
9	(Hong Kong) C Wong	6	6^{4}	6
3	(Switzerland) K Feldbausch	2	7^{7}	4

==== Section 4 ====
First round
6	(Argentina) Lautaro Midón	6	6
(United States) Learner Tien	3	2
(Serbia) Branko Djuric	6	2	2
(Slovakia) Peter Naď	1	6	6
(France) Paul Barbier Gazeu	3	2
WC	(United States) Kyle Kang	6	6
(Brazil) João Fonseca	7	6^{6}	1
11	(Czech Republic) Jakub Nicod	5	7^{8}	6
14	Yaroslav Demin	7	6
(United States) Nicholas Godsick	5	4
WC	(United States) Darwin Blanch	6	6
(Spain) Pedro Ródenas	2	4
WC	(United States) Alexander Razeghi	4	2
(Poland) Olaf Pieczkowski	6	6
(Peru) Gianluca Ballotta	2	1
2	(Belgium) Gilles-Arnaud Bailly	6	6

Second round
6	(Argentina) L Midón	5	6^{8}
(Slovakia) P Naď	7	7^{10}
WC	(United States) K Kang	2	6	6
11	(Czech Republic) J Nicod	6	1	1
14	Y Demin	6	3	7
WC	(United States) Dar Blanch	4	6	5
(Poland) O Pieczkowski	3	6	1
2	(Belgium) G-A Bailly	6	3	6

Third round
(Slovakia) P Naď	5^{r}
WC	(United States) K Kang	5
14	Y Demin	3	6	3
2	(Belgium) G-A Bailly	6	4	6

Quarterfinals
WC	(United States) K Kang	4	6	1
2	(Belgium) G-A Bailly	6	3	6

== Qualifying ==
=== Seeds ===
1. Danil Panarin (qualifying competition)
2. (Kazakhstan) Max Batyutenko (first round)
3. (United States) Yannik Rahman (qualifying competition)
4. (Poland) Borys Zgoła (qualified)
5. (Cyprus) Constantinos Koshis (qualified)
6. (United Kingdom) William Jansen (qualified)
7. (Japan) Lennon Roark Jones (first round)
8. (Mexico) Luis Carlos Álvarez Valdés (first round)
9. (Turkey) Togan Tokaç (qualified)
10. (Japan) Kenta Miyoshi (first round)
11. (Croatia) Ivan Šodan (first round)
12. (Sweden) Sebastian Eriksson (first round)
13. (Australia) Edward Winter (qualified)
14. (United Kingdom) Patrick Brady (qualified)
15. (United States) Meecah Bigun (qualifying competition)
16. (Portugal) Tiago Pereira (first round)

=== Qualifiers ===
1. (Turkey) Togan Tokaç
2. (United States) Sean Daryabeigi
3. (United Kingdom) Patrick Brady
4. (Poland) Borys Zgoła
5. (Cyprus) Constantinos Koshis
6. (United Kingdom) William Jansen
7. (United States) Hudson Rivera
8. (Australia) Edward Winter

=== Lucky loser ===
1. (United States) Calvin Baierl

=== Draw ===
==== First qualifier ====
First round
1	Danil Panarin	6	6
WC	(United States) Stiles Brockett	1	3
(Netherlands) Daniël Verbeek	2	2
9	(Turkey) Togan Tokaç	6	6

Qualifying competition
1	Danil Panarin	2	3
9	(Turkey) Togan Tokaç	6	6

==== Second qualifier ====
First round
2	(Kazakhstan) Max Batyutenko	1	2
(United States) Sean Daryabeigi	6	6
WC	(United States) Calvin Baierl	2	6	[10]
10	(Japan) Kenta Miyoshi	6	4	[5]

Qualifying competition
(United States) Sean Daryabeigi	6	6
WC	(United States) Calvin Baierl	3	1

==== Third qualifier ====
First round
3/WC	(United States) Yannik Rahman	6	4	[10]
(Switzerland) Nicolas Kobelt	4	6	[6]
WC	(Japan) Kosuke Morita	3	5
14	(United Kingdom) Patrick Brady	6	7

Qualifying competition
3/WC	(United States) Yannik Rahman	0	2
14	(United Kingdom) Patrick Brady	6	6

==== Fourth qualifier ====
First round
4	(Poland) Borys Zgoła	2	6	[10]
(United States) Felipe Pinzon Moreno	6	0	[7]
(Chile) Nicolás Villalón Valdés	5	1
15	(United States) Meecah Bigun	7	6

Qualifying competition
4	(Poland) Borys Zgoła	6	6^{1}	[10]
15	(United States) Meecah Bigun	4	7^{7}	[5]

==== Fifth qualifier ====
First round
5	(Cyprus) Constantinos Koshis	3	7	[10]
(United States) Marko Mesarovic	6	5	[7]
(Switzerland) Manfredi Graziani	7^{7}	0	[10]
12	(Sweden) Sebastian Eriksson	6^{4}	6	[7]

Qualifying competition
5	(Cyprus) Constantinos Koshis	7^{7}	6
(Switzerland) Manfredi Graziani	6^{5}	4

==== Sixth qualifier ====
First round
6	(United Kingdom) William Jansen	3	7	[10]
(Canada) Duncan Chan	6	5	[7]
(United States) Kurt Miller	6	6
11	(Croatia) Ivan Šodan	2	3

Qualifying competition
6	(United Kingdom) William Jansen	6	6
(United States) Kurt Miller	0	0

==== Seventh qualifier ====
First round
7	(Japan) Lennon Roark Jones	4	6	[8]
(United States) Preston Stearns	6	3	[10]
WC	(United States) Hudson Rivera	6	6
16	(Portugal) Tiago Pereira	2	1

Qualifying competition
(United States) Preston Stearns	3	6	[5]
WC	(United States) Hudson Rivera	6	1	[10]

==== Eighth qualifier ====
First round
8	(Mexico) Luis Carlos Álvarez Valdés	5	4
(United Kingdom) Matthew Rankin	7	6
WC	(United States) Cooper Woestendick	0	2
13	(Australia) Edward Winter	6	6

Qualifying competition
(United Kingdom) Matthew Rankin	6	2	[11]
13	(Australia) Edward Winter	2	6	[13]
