= 2022 US Open – Girls' doubles =

Girls' doubles
- 2022 US Open

Final
- Champions: (Czech Republic) Lucie Havlíčková; Diana Shnaider
- Runners-up: (Germany) Carolina Kuhl (Germany) Ella Seidel
- Score: 6–3, 6–2

Events
Singles	men	women		boys	girls
Doubles	men	women	mixed	boys	girls
WC Singles	men	women	quad
WC Doubles	men	women	quad
Legends	men	women	mixed
- US Open

Ashlyn Krueger and Robin Montgomery were the reigning champions, but Krueger is no longer eligible to participate in junior events and Montgomery chose not to participate.

Lucie Havlíčková and Diana Shnaider won the title, defeating Carolina Kuhl and Ella Seidel in the final, 6–3, 6–2.

== Seeds ==
1. (Czech Republic) Lucie Havlíčková / Diana Shnaider (champions)
2. (Belgium) Sofia Costoulas / (Hungary) Luca Udvardy (second round)
3. (United States) Liv Hovde / (Australia) Taylah Preston (semifinals)
4. Mirra Andreeva / (Philippines) Alex Eala (second round, withdrew)
5. (United States) Qavia Lopez / (Denmark) Johanne Svendsen (first round)
6. (Canada) Kayla Cross / (Canada) Victoria Mboko (first round)
7. (Slovakia) Irina Balus / (Slovakia) Nikola Daubnerová (first round)
8. (Switzerland) Céline Naef / (Belgium) Amelie Van Impe (first round)

== Draw ==
Key

- Q = Qualifier
- WC = Wild card
- LL = Lucky loser
- Alt = Alternate
- ITF = ITF entry
- PR = Protected ranking
- SR = Special ranking
- SE = Special exempt
- JE = Junior exempt
- JR = Junior Accelerator Programme entrant
- CO = College Accelerator Programme entrant
- NG = Next Gen Accelerator Program entrant
- w/o = Walkover
- r = Retired
- d = Defaulted

=== Finals ===
Semifinals
1	(Czech Republic) Lucie Havlíčková; Diana Shnaider	6	7^{7}
3	(United States) Liv Hovde (Australia) Taylah Preston	1	6^{1}
(Germany) Carolina Kuhl (Germany) Ella Seidel	7	6
(United States) Alexis Blokhina (Canada) Annabelle Xu	5	4

Final
1	(Czech Republic) Lucie Havlíčková; Diana Shnaider	6	6
(Germany) Carolina Kuhl (Germany) Ella Seidel	3	2

=== Top half ===
First round
1	(Czech Republic) Lucie Havlíčková; Diana Shnaider	6	6
(Kazakhstan) Sandugash Kenzhibayeva (Kazakhstan) Aruzhan Sagandikova	2	3
(Slovakia) Renáta Jamrichová (Slovakia) Nina Vargová	7^{7}	6
(United States) Tatum Evans (United States) Kaitlin Quevedo	6^{2}	3
(Slovenia) Ela Nala Milić (Poland) Malwina Rowińska	7^{7}	5	[10]
(France) Yaroslava Bartashevich; Ksenia Zaytseva	6^{4}	7	[8]
(Morocco) Malak El Allami (United Kingdom) Ella McDonald	6
6	(Canada) Kayla Cross (Canada) Victoria Mboko	3^{r}
3	(United States) Liv Hovde (Australia) Taylah Preston	6	6
(Ukraine) Anastasiya Lopata (United States) Mia Slama	1	2
(United States) Alanis Hamilton (United States) Capucine Jauffret	6	2	[8]
(Australia) Charlotte Kempenaers-Pocz (Japan) Sara Saito	3	6	[10]
WC	(United States) Natalie Block (United States) Piper Charney	6	4	[10]
(Italy) Georgia Pedone (Italy) Federica Urgesi	2	6	[2]
(Netherlands) Rose Marie Nijkamp (Kenya) Angella Okutoyi	6	6
5	(United States) Qavia Lopez (Denmark) Johanne Svendsen	1	3

Second round
1	(Czech Republic) L Havlíčková; D Shnaider	6	7
(Slovakia) R Jamrichová (Slovakia) N Vargová	3	5
(Slovenia) EN Milić (Poland) M Rowińska	6	3	[10]
(Morocco) M El Allami (United Kingdom) E McDonald	3	6	[7]
3	(United States) L Hovde (Australia) T Preston	6	6
(Australia) C Kempenaers-Pocz (Japan) S Saito	2	3
WC	(United States) N Block (United States) P Charney	7^{7}	6
(Netherlands) RM Nijkamp (Kenya) A Okutoyi	6^{5}	3

Quarterfinals
1	(Czech Republic) L Havlíčková; D Shnaider	6	6
(Slovenia) EN Milić (Poland) M Rowińska	1	1
3	(United States) L Hovde (Australia) T Preston	7	6
WC	(United States) N Block (United States) P Charney	5	4

Semifinals
1	(Czech Republic) L Havlíčková; D Shnaider	6	7^{7}
3	(United States) L Hovde (Australia) T Preston	1	6^{1}

=== Bottom half ===
First round
7	(Slovakia) Irina Balus (Slovakia) Nikola Daubnerová	1	2
(Canada) Mia Kupres (United Kingdom) Ranah Stoiber	6	6
(Japan) Sayaka Ishii (Thailand) Lanlana Tararudee	6	6
(United States) Ava Krug (United States) Valeria Ray	3	4
(Bulgaria) Denislava Glushkova (Spain) Raquel González Vilar	2	4
(Germany) Carolina Kuhl (Germany) Ella Seidel	6	6
WC	(United States) Iva Jovic (United States) Shannon Lam	2	2
4	Mirra Andreeva (Philippines) Alex Eala	6	6
8	(Switzerland) Céline Naef (Belgium) Amelie Van Impe	2	3
Anastasiia Gureva (Japan) Hayu Kinoshita	6	6
(Turkey) Melisa Ercan (Belgium) Amelia Waligora	3	5
(United States) Alexis Blokhina (Canada) Annabelle Xu	6	7
(United States) Katherine Hui (United States) Eleana Yu	6	6
(Poland) Weronika Ewald (Denmark) Rebecca Munk Mortensen	2	2
(Argentina) Luciana Moyano (Peru) Lucciana Pérez Alarcón	3	5
2	(Belgium) Sofia Costoulas (Hungary) Luca Udvardy	6	7

Second round
(Canada) M Kupres (United Kingdom) RA Stoiber	7	6
(Japan) S Ishii (Thailand) L Tararudee	5	4
(Germany) C Kuhl (Germany) E Seidel	w/o
4	M Andreeva (Philippines) A Eala
A Gureva (Japan) H Kinoshita	3	6	[9]
(United States) A Blokhina (Canada) A Xu	6	3	[11]
(United States) K Hui (United States) E Yu	6	7^{7}
2	(Belgium) S Costoulas (Hungary) L Udvardy	4	6^{4}

Quarterfinals
(Canada) M Kupres (United Kingdom) RA Stoiber	6	5	[8]
(Germany) C Kuhl (Germany) E Seidel	4	7	[10]
(United States) A Blokhina (Canada) A Xu	7	4	[10]
(United States) K Hui (United States) E Yu	5	6	[8]

Semifinals
(Germany) C Kuhl (Germany) E Seidel	7	6
(United States) A Blokhina (Canada) A Xu	5	4
