= 2022 US Open – Wheelchair women's singles =

Wheelchair women's singles
- 2022 US Open

Final
- Champion: (Netherlands) Diede de Groot
- Runner-up: (Japan) Yui Kamiji
- Score: 3–6, 6–1, 6–1

Details
- Draw: 16
- Seeds: 4

Events
| Singles | men | women | | boys | girls |
| Doubles | men | women | mixed | boys | girls |
| WC Singles | men | women | quad |
| WC Doubles | men | women | quad |
| Legends | men | women | mixed |
| ← 2021 · | US Open | · 2023 → |

Four-time defending champion Diede de Groot defeated Yui Kamiji in the final, 3–6, 6–1, 6–1 to win the women's singles wheelchair tennis title at the 2022 US Open. With the win, de Groot completed the Grand Slam, and became the first player in any discipline of tennis to do so in consecutive years. This also marked the sixth consecutive year that de Groot and Kamiji contested the final.

== Seeds ==
1. (Netherlands) Diede de Groot (champion)
2. (Japan) Yui Kamiji (final)
3. (Netherlands) Aniek van Koot (semifinals)
4. (China) Zhu Zhenzhen (first round)

== Draw ==
=== Key ===
- Q = Qualifier
- WC = Wild card
- LL = Lucky loser
- Alt = Alternate
- ITF = ITF entry
- PR = Protected ranking
- SR = Special ranking
- SE = Special exempt
- JE = Junior exempt
- JR = Junior Accelerator Programme entrant
- CO = College Accelerator Programme entrant
- NG = Next Gen Accelerator Program entrant
- w/o = Walkover
- r = Retired
- d = Defaulted

=== Draw ===
First round
1 | (Netherlands) Diede de Groot | 6 | 6
(United Kingdom) Lucy Shuker | 2 | 0
(Japan) Momoko Ohtani | 6 | 7
(Colombia) Angélica Bernal | 4 | 5
3 | (Netherlands) Aniek van Koot | 6 | 6
(United States) Dana Mathewson | 4 | 3
WC | (France) Pauline Déroulède | 2 | 5
(Germany) Katharina Krüger | 6 | 7
WC | (Japan) Shiori Funamizu | 2 | 4
(Japan) Manami Tanaka | 6 | 6
(Netherlands) Jiske Griffioen | 6 | 6
4 | (China) Zhu Zhenzhen | 1 | 3
(Japan) Saki Takamuro | 7^{14} | 4 | 1
(South Africa) Kgothatso Montjane | 6^{12} | 6 | 6
(Chile) Macarena Cabrillana | 0 | 1
2 | (Japan) Yui Kamiji | 6 | 6

Quarterfinals
1 | (Netherlands) D de Groot | 6 | 0
(Japan) M Ohtani | 1 | 0^{r}
3 | (Netherlands) A van Koot | 6 | 6
(Germany) K Krüger | 2 | 1
(Japan) M Tanaka | 1 | 2
(Netherlands) J Griffioen | 6 | 6
(South Africa) K Montjane | 1 | 0
2 | (Japan) Y Kamiji | 6 | 6

Semifinals
1 | (Netherlands) D de Groot | 6 | 6
3 | (Netherlands) A van Koot | 2 | 1
(Netherlands) J Griffioen | 1 | 3
2 | (Japan) Y Kamiji | 6 | 6

Final
1 | (Netherlands) D de Groot | 3 | 6 | 6
2 | (Japan) Y Kamiji | 6 | 1 | 1
