= 2022 US Open – Wheelchair men's singles =

Wheelchair men's singles
- 2022 US Open

Final
- Champion: (United Kingdom) Alfie Hewett
- Runner-up: (Japan) Shingo Kunieda
- Score: 7–6^{(7–2)}, 6–1

Events
Singles	men	women		boys	girls
Doubles	men	women	mixed	boys	girls
WC Singles	men	women	quad
WC Doubles	men	women	quad
Legends	men	women	mixed
← 2021 ·	US Open	· 2023 →

Alfie Hewett defeated the two-time defending champion Shingo Kunieda in the final, 7–6^{(7–2)}, 6–1 to win the men's singles wheelchair tennis title at the 2022 US Open. It was his third US Open singles title and sixth major singles title overall. Kunieda was attempting to complete the first Grand Slam in wheelchair men's singles history.

== Seeds ==
1. (Japan) Shingo Kunieda (final)
2. (United Kingdom) Alfie Hewett (champion)
3. (Argentina) Gustavo Fernández (first round)
4. (Japan) Tokito Oda (quarterfinals)

== Draw ==
=== Key ===
- Q = Qualifier
- WC = Wild card
- LL = Lucky loser
- Alt = Alternate
- ITF = ITF entry
- PR = Protected ranking
- SR = Special ranking
- SE = Special exempt
- JE = Junior exempt
- JR = Junior Accelerator Programme entrant
- CO = College Accelerator Programme entrant
- NG = Next Gen Accelerator Program entrant
- w/o = Walkover
- r = Retired
- d = Defaulted

=== Finals ===
First round
1	(Japan) Shingo Kunieda	6	7
(Belgium) Joachim Gérard	3	5
(United Kingdom) Gordon Reid	2	0^{r}
(Spain) Martín de la Puente	6	0
3	(Argentina) Gustavo Fernández	3	6^{2}
(Japan) Takuya Miki	6	7^{7}
WC	(United States) Jason Keatseangsilp	0	1
(Netherlands) Ruben Spaargaren	6	6
(Chile) Alexander Cataldo	2	4
(France) Nicolas Peifer	6	6
(Spain) Daniel Caverzaschi	0	0^{r}
4	(Japan) Tokito Oda	6	0
WC	(United States) Casey Ratzlaff	4	6	3
(Netherlands) Tom Egberink	6	2	6
(Netherlands) Maikel Scheffers	2	4
2	(United Kingdom) Alfie Hewett	6	6

Quarterfinals
1	(Japan) S Kunieda	6	6
(Spain) M de la Puente	1	2
(Japan) T Miki	6	6
(Netherlands) R Spaargaren	4	3
(France) N Peifer	3	6	6
4	(Japan) T Oda	6	3	2
(Netherlands) T Egberink	1	3
2	(United Kingdom) A Hewett	6	6

Semifinals
1	(Japan) S Kunieda	6	6
(Japan) T Miki	1	2
(France) N Peifer	3	1
2	(United Kingdom) A Hewett	6	6

Final
1	(Japan) S Kunieda	6^{2}	1
2	(United Kingdom) A Hewett	7^{7}	6
