= 2022 US Open – Wheelchair men's doubles =

Wheelchair men's doubles
- 2022 US Open

Final
- Champions: (Spain) Martín de la Puente (France) Nicolas Peifer
- Runners-up: (United Kingdom) Alfie Hewett (United Kingdom) Gordon Reid
- Score: 4–6, 7–5, [10–6]

Events
Singles	men	women		boys	girls
Doubles	men	women	mixed	boys	girls
WC Singles	men	women	quad
WC Doubles	men	women	quad
Legends	men	women	mixed
← 2021 ·	US Open	· 2023 →

Martín de la Puente and Nicolas Peifer defeated the five-time defending champions Alfie Hewett and Gordon Reid in the final, 4–6, 7–5, [10–6] to win the men's doubles wheelchair tennis title at the 2022 US Open. It was de la Puente's maiden major title, and Peifer's eighth in doubles.

== Seeds ==
1. (United Kingdom) Alfie Hewett / (United Kingdom) Gordon Reid (final)
2. (Spain) Martín de la Puente / (France) Nicolas Peifer (champions)

== Draw ==
=== Key ===
- Q = Qualifier
- WC = Wild card
- LL = Lucky loser
- Alt = Alternate
- ITF = ITF entry
- PR = Protected ranking
- SR = Special ranking
- SE = Special exempt
- JE = Junior exempt
- JR = Junior Accelerator Programme entrant
- CO = College Accelerator Programme entrant
- NG = Next Gen Accelerator Program entrant
- w/o = Walkover
- r = Retired
- d = Defaulted

=== Finals ===
Quarterfinals
1	(United Kingdom) Alfie Hewett (United Kingdom) Gordon Reid	w/o
(Spain) Daniel Caverzaschi (United States) Jason Keatseangsilp
(Japan) Takuya Miki (United States) Casey Ratzlaff	6	3	[4]
(Chile) Alexander Cataldo (Japan) Tokito Oda	2	6	[10]
(Netherlands) Tom Egberink (Belgium) Joachim Gérard	7	6
(Argentina) Gustavo Fernández (Japan) Shingo Kunieda	5	4
(Netherlands) Maikel Scheffers (Netherlands) Ruben Spaargaren	4	0
2	(Spain) Martín de la Puente (France) Nicolas Peifer	6	6

Semifinals
1	(United Kingdom) Alfie Hewett (United Kingdom) Gordon Reid	6	6
(Chile) Alexander Cataldo (Japan) Tokito Oda	3	3
(Netherlands) Tom Egberink (Belgium) Joachim Gérard	3	6	[6]
2	(Spain) Martín de la Puente (France) Nicolas Peifer	6	4	[10]

Final
1	(United Kingdom) Alfie Hewett (United Kingdom) Gordon Reid	6	5	[6]
2	(Spain) Martín de la Puente (France) Nicolas Peifer	4	7	[10]
