= 2022 US Open – Wheelchair quad singles =

Wheelchair quad singles
- 2022 US Open

Final
- Champion: (Netherlands) Niels Vink
- Runner-up: (Netherlands) Sam Schröder
- Score: 7–5, 6–3

Events
Singles	men	women		boys	girls
Doubles	men	women	mixed	boys	girls
WC Singles	men	women	quad
WC Doubles	men	women	quad
Legends	men	women	mixed
← 2021 ·	US Open	· 2023 →

Niels Vink defeated Sam Schröder in the final, 7–5, 6–3 to win the quad singles wheelchair tennis title at the 2022 US Open. It was his first US Open singles title and second major singles title overall.

Dylan Alcott was the reigning champion, but retired from professional wheelchair tennis in January 2022.

== Seeds ==
1. (Netherlands) Niels Vink (champion)
2. (Netherlands) Sam Schröder (final)

== Draw ==
=== Key ===
- Q = Qualifier
- WC = Wild card
- LL = Lucky loser
- Alt = Alternate
- ITF = ITF entry
- PR = Protected ranking
- SR = Special ranking
- SE = Special exempt
- JE = Junior exempt
- JR = Junior Accelerator Programme entrant
- CO = College Accelerator Programme entrant
- NG = Next Gen Accelerator Program entrant
- w/o = Walkover
- r = Retired
- d = Defaulted

=== Finals ===
Quarterfinals
1	(Netherlands) Niels Vink	6	6
WC	(Canada) Robert Shaw	2	0
(Japan) Koji Sugeno	6	3	5
(South Africa) Donald Ramphadi	2	6	7
(United Kingdom) Andy Lapthorne	6	1	2
(United States) David Wagner	4	6	6
(Australia) Heath Davidson	6	6^{3}	3
2	(Netherlands) Sam Schröder	3	7^{7}	6

Semifinals
1	(Netherlands) Niels Vink	6	6
(South Africa) Donald Ramphadi	1	1
(United States) David Wagner	0	6^{3}
2	(Netherlands) Sam Schröder	6	7^{7}

Final
1	(Netherlands) Niels Vink	7	6
2	(Netherlands) Sam Schröder	5	3
