= 2022 US Open – Mixed doubles =

Mixed doubles
- 2022 US Open

Final
- Champions: (Australia) Storm Sanders (Australia) John Peers
- Runners-up: (Belgium) Kirsten Flipkens (France) Édouard Roger-Vasselin
- Score: 4–6, 6–4, [10–7]

Details
- Draw: 32
- Seeds: 8

Events
Singles	men	women		boys	girls
Doubles	men	women	mixed	boys	girls
WC Singles	men	women	quad
WC Doubles	men	women	quad
Legends	men	women	mixed
- US Open

Storm Sanders and John Peers defeated Kirsten Flipkens and Édouard Roger-Vasselin in the final, 4–6, 6–4, [10–7] to win the mixed doubles tennis title at the 2022 US Open.

Desirae Krawczyk and Joe Salisbury were the reigning champions, but Salisbury did not participate this year. Krawczyk partnered Neal Skupski, but lost in the second round to Caty McNally and William Blumberg.

== Seeds ==
1. (United States) Desirae Krawczyk / (United Kingdom) Neal Skupski (second round)
2. (China) Zhang Shuai / (Croatia) Mate Pavić (semifinals)
3. (Mexico) Giuliana Olmos / (El Salvador) Marcelo Arévalo (first round)
4. (Australia) Storm Sanders / (Australia) John Peers (champions)
5. (United States) Jessica Pegula / (United States) Austin Krajicek (second round)
6. (China) Yang Zhaoxuan / (India) Rohan Bopanna (first round)
7. (Australia) Ellen Perez / (New Zealand) Michael Venus (second round)
8. (Netherlands) Demi Schuurs / (Netherlands) Matwé Middelkoop (first round)

== Draw ==
Key

- Q = Qualifier
- WC = Wild card
- LL = Lucky loser
- Alt = Alternate
- ITF = ITF entry
- PR = Protected ranking
- SR = Special ranking
- SE = Special exempt
- JE = Junior exempt
- JR = Junior Accelerator Programme entrant
- CO = College Accelerator Programme entrant
- NG = Next Gen Accelerator Program entrant
- w/o = Walkover
- r = Retired
- d = Defaulted

=== Finals ===
Semifinals
WC	(United States) Caty McNally (United States) William Blumberg	2	7^{7}	[8]
4	(Australia) Storm Sanders (Australia) John Peers	6	6^{5}	[10]
PR	(Belgium) Kirsten Flipkens (France) Édouard Roger-Vasselin	6	5	[10]
2	(China) Zhang Shuai (Croatia) Mate Pavić	4	7	[6]

Final
4	(Australia) Storm Sanders (Australia) John Peers	4	6	[10]
PR	(Belgium) Kirsten Flipkens (France) Édouard Roger-Vasselin	6	4	[7]

=== Top half ===
First round
1	(United States) D Krawczyk (United Kingdom) N Skupski	7^{7}	6
WC	(United States) A Parks (United States) C Eubanks	6^{4}	2
WC	(United States) C McNally (United States) W Blumberg	7	7
V Azarenka (Australia) T Kokkinakis	5	5
(Latvia) J Ostapenko (Spain) D Vega Hernández	6	7^{7}
(Ukraine) L Kichenok (Brazil) R Matos	2	6^{5}
(Germany) L Siegemund (United Kingdom) J Murray	2	6^{5}
7	(Australia) E Perez (New Zealand) M Venus	6	7^{7}
4	(Australia) S Sanders (Australia) J Peers	6	7
WC	(United States) C Harrison (United States) R Galloway	3	5
WC	(United States) B Pera (United States) J Withrow	5	7^{7}	[11]
(Chile) A Guarachi (Finland) H Heliövaara	7	6^{2}	[9]
(Canada) L Fernandez (United States) J Sock	6	2	[10]
(Belgium) K Zimmermann (Germany) T Pütz	2	6	[5]
(Canada) G Dabrowski (Australia) M Purcell	7	7
6	(China) Z Yang (India) R Bopanna	5	5

Second round
1	(United States) D Krawczyk (United Kingdom) N Skupski	2	4
WC	(United States) C McNally (United States) W Blumberg	6	6
(Latvia) J Ostapenko (Spain) D Vega Hernández	6	6
7	(Australia) E Perez (New Zealand) M Venus	1	1
4	(Australia) S Sanders (Australia) J Peers	6	6
WC	(United States) B Pera (United States) J Withrow	4	4
(Canada) L Fernandez (United States) J Sock	6	7^{7}
(Canada) G Dabrowski (Australia) M Purcell	4	6^{4}

Quarterfinals
WC	(United States) C McNally (United States) W Blumberg	7^{10}	6
(Latvia) J Ostapenko (Spain) D Vega Hernández	6^{8}	2
4	(Australia) S Sanders (Australia) J Peers	7	7^{7}
(Canada) L Fernandez (United States) J Sock	5	6^{3}

Semifinals
WC	(United States) C McNally (United States) W Blumberg	2	7^{7}	[8]
4	(Australia) S Sanders (Australia) J Peers	6	6^{5}	[10]

=== Bottom half ===
First round
5	(United States) J Pegula (United States) A Krajicek	7	6
WC	(United States) R Montgomery (United States) N Monroe	5	4
(Australia) S Stosur (Australia) M Ebden	6	6
(Slovenia) A Klepač (Mexico) S González	3	3
(United States) N Melichar-Martinez (Germany) K Krawietz	7^{7}	7^{7}
Alt	(New Zealand) E Routliffe (Germany) A Mies	6^{2}	6^{4}
PR	(Belgium) K Flipkens (France) É Roger-Vasselin	6	6
3	(Mexico) G Olmos (El Salvador) M Arévalo	4	4
8	(Netherlands) D Schuurs (Netherlands) M Middelkoop	4	4
PR	(Czech Republic) L Hradecká (Poland) Ł Kubot	6	6
PR	(Japan) E Shibahara (Croatia) F Škugor	7	2	[10]
(France) K Mladenovic (Croatia) N Mektić	5	6	[5]
WC	(United States) J Daniel (United States) R Ciamarra	4	2
WC	(United States) M Keys (United States) B Fratangelo	6	6
WC	(United States) L Chirico (United States) B Klahn	6^{1}	3
2	(China) S Zhang (Croatia) M Pavić	7^{7}	6

Second round
5	(United States) J Pegula (United States) A Krajicek	6^{4}	4
(Australia) S Stosur (Australia) M Ebden	7^{7}	6
(United States) N Melichar-Martinez (Germany) K Krawietz	6^{3}	6^{5}
PR	(Belgium) K Flipkens (France) É Roger-Vasselin	7^{7}	7^{7}
PR	(Czech Republic) L Hradecká (Poland) Ł Kubot	3	4
PR	(Japan) E Shibahara (Croatia) F Škugor	6	6
WC	(United States) M Keys (United States) B Fratangelo	4	2
2	(China) S Zhang (Croatia) M Pavić	6	6

Quarterfinals
(Australia) S Stosur (Australia) M Ebden	7^{9}	4	[9]
PR	(Belgium) K Flipkens (France) É Roger-Vasselin	6^{7}	6	[11]
PR	(Japan) E Shibahara (Croatia) F Škugor	6^{5}	6	[3]
2	(China) S Zhang (Croatia) M Pavić	7^{7}	4	[10]

Semifinals
PR	(Belgium) K Flipkens (France) É Roger-Vasselin	6	5	[10]
2	(China) S Zhang (Croatia) M Pavić	4	7	[6]

== Other entry information ==
=== Wild cards ===
- (United States) Louisa Chirico / (United States) Bradley Klahn
- (United States) Jaeda Daniel / (United States) Richard Ciamarra
- (United States) Catherine Harrison / (United States) Robert Galloway
- (United States) Madison Keys / (United States) Bjorn Fratangelo
- (United States) Caty McNally / (United States) William Blumberg
- (United States) Robin Montgomery / (United States) Nicholas Monroe
- (United States) Alycia Parks / (United States) Christopher Eubanks
- (United States) Bernarda Pera / (United States) Jackson Withrow

=== Protected ranking ===
- (Belgium) Kirsten Flipkens / (France) Édouard Roger-Vasselin
- (Czech Republic) Lucie Hradecká / (Poland) Łukasz Kubot
- (Japan) Ena Shibahara / (Croatia) Franko Škugor

=== Alternates ===
- (New Zealand) Erin Routliffe / (Germany) Andreas Mies

=== Withdrawals ===
- (France) Alizé Cornet / (France) Nicolas Mahut → replaced by (New Zealand) Erin Routliffe / (Germany) Andreas Mies
