= 2022 US Open – Wheelchair quad doubles =

Wheelchair quad doubles
- 2022 US Open

Final
- Champions: (Netherlands) Sam Schröder (Netherlands) Niels Vink
- Runners-up: (Canada) Robert Shaw (United States) David Wagner
- Score: 6–1, 6–2

Events
Singles	men	women		boys	girls
Doubles	men	women	mixed	boys	girls
WC Singles	men	women	quad
WC Doubles	men	women	quad
Legends	men	women	mixed
← 2021 ·	US Open	· 2023 →

Defending champions Sam Schröder and Niels Vink defeated Robert Shaw and David Wagner in the final, 6–1, 6–2 to win the quad doubles wheelchair tennis title at the 2022 US Open.

== Seeds ==
1. (Netherlands) Sam Schröder / (Netherlands) Niels Vink (champions)
2. (Canada) Robert Shaw / (United States) David Wagner (final)

== Draw ==
=== Key ===
- Q = Qualifier
- WC = Wild card
- LL = Lucky loser
- Alt = Alternate
- ITF = ITF entry
- PR = Protected ranking
- SR = Special ranking
- SE = Special exempt
- JE = Junior exempt
- JR = Junior Accelerator Programme entrant
- CO = College Accelerator Programme entrant
- NG = Next Gen Accelerator Program entrant
- w/o = Walkover
- r = Retired
- d = Defaulted

=== Finals ===
Semifinals
1	(Netherlands) Sam Schröder (Netherlands) Niels Vink	7^{8}	7^{7}
(South Africa) Donald Ramphadi (Japan) Koji Sugeno	6^{6}	6^{5}
(Australia) Heath Davidson (United Kingdom) Andy Lapthorne	1	1
2	(Canada) Robert Shaw (United States) David Wagner	6	6

Final
1	(Netherlands) Sam Schröder (Netherlands) Niels Vink	6	6
2	(Canada) Robert Shaw (United States) David Wagner	1	2
