= 2022 US Open – Wheelchair women's doubles =

Wheelchair women's doubles
- 2022 US Open

Final
- Champions: (Netherlands) Diede de Groot (Netherlands) Aniek van Koot
- Runners-up: (Japan) Yui Kamiji (South Africa) Kgothatso Montjane
- Score: 6–2, 6–2

Events
Singles	men	women		boys	girls
Doubles	men	women	mixed	boys	girls
WC Singles	men	women	quad
WC Doubles	men	women	quad
Legends	men	women	mixed
← 2021 ·	US Open	· 2023 →

Defending champions Diede de Groot and Aniek van Koot defeated Yui Kamiji and Kgothatso Montjane in the final, 6–2, 6–2 to win the women's doubles wheelchair tennis title at the 2022 US Open.

== Seeds ==
1. (Netherlands) Diede de Groot / (Netherlands) Aniek van Koot (champions)
2. (Japan) Yui Kamiji / (South Africa) Kgothatso Montjane (final)

== Draw ==
=== Key ===
- Q = Qualifier
- WC = Wild card
- LL = Lucky loser
- Alt = Alternate
- ITF = ITF entry
- PR = Protected ranking
- SR = Special ranking
- SE = Special exempt
- JE = Junior exempt
- JR = Junior Accelerator Programme entrant
- CO = College Accelerator Programme entrant
- NG = Next Gen Accelerator Program entrant
- w/o = Walkover
- r = Retired
- d = Defaulted

=== Finals ===
Quarterfinals
1	(Netherlands) Diede de Groot (Netherlands) Aniek van Koot	6	6
(Colombia) Angélica Bernal (Japan) Shiori Funamizu	1	1
(France) Pauline Déroulède (Germany) Katharina Krüger	3	1
(Japan) Manami Tanaka (China) Zhu Zhenzhen	6	6
(Chile) Macarena Cabrillana (Japan) Saki Takamuro	3	0
(Netherlands) Jiske Griffioen (Japan) Momoko Ohtani	6	6
(United States) Dana Mathewson (United Kingdom) Lucy Shuker	1	0
2	(Japan) Yui Kamiji (South Africa) Kgothatso Montjane	6	6

Semifinals
1	(Netherlands) Diede de Groot (Netherlands) Aniek van Koot	6	6
(Japan) Manami Tanaka (China) Zhu Zhenzhen	0	1
(Netherlands) Jiske Griffioen (Japan) Momoko Ohtani
2	(Japan) Yui Kamiji (South Africa) Kgothatso Montjane	w/o

Final
1	(Netherlands) Diede de Groot (Netherlands) Aniek van Koot	6	6
2	(Japan) Yui Kamiji (South Africa) Kgothatso Montjane	2	2
