= 2022 Monterrey Open =

Women's tennis tournament in Mexico

- Date: 28 February – 6 March
- Edition: 14th
- Category: WTA 250
- Draw: 32S / 16D
- Prize money: $235,238
- Surface: Hard
- Location: Monterrey, Mexico
- Venue: Club Sonoma

Champions

Singles
- (Canada) Leylah Fernandez

Doubles
- (United States) Catherine Harrison / (United States) Sabrina Santamaria
- Monterrey Open

The 2022 Monterrey Open, also known as the Abierto GNP Seguros for sponsorship reasons, was a women's tennis tournament played on outdoor hard courts. It was the 14th edition of the Monterrey Open and a WTA 250 tournament on the 2022 WTA Tour. It took place at the Club Sonoma in Monterrey, Mexico, from February 28 to March 6, 2022. During this tournament, the WTA and other international governing bodies of tennis including the ATP did not have players of Russia and Belarus compete under their country flags as a result of the Russian invasion of Ukraine. Second-seeded Leylah Fernandez won her second consecutive singles title at the event.

== Finals ==
=== Singles ===
(Canada) Leylah Fernandez defeated (Colombia) Camila Osorio, 6–7^{(5–7)}, 6–4, 7–6^{(7–3)}

- It was Fernandez's only WTA singles title of the year and the 2nd of her career.

=== Doubles ===
(United States) Catherine Harrison / (United States) Sabrina Santamaria defeated (China) Han Xinyun / Yana Sizikova, 1–6, 7–5, [10–6]

== Points and prize money ==
=== Point distribution ===
Event	W	F	SF	QF	Round of 16	Round of 32	Q	Q2	Q1
Singles	280	180	110	60	30	1	18	12	1
Doubles	280	180	110	60	1	—N/a	—N/a	—N/a	—N/a

=== Prize money ===
Event	W	F	SF	QF	Round of 16	Round of 32	Q2	Q1
Singles	$31,000	$18,037	$10,100	$5,800	$3,675	$2,675	$1,950	$1,270
Doubles*	$10,800	$6,300	$3,800	$2,300	$1,750	—N/a	—N/a	—N/a

_{*per team}

== Singles main draw entrants ==
=== Seeds ===
Country	Player	Ranking^{1}	Seed
UKR	Elina Svitolina	15	1
CAN	Leylah Fernandez	19	2
USA	Madison Keys	29	3
ESP	Sara Sorribes Tormo	32	4
COL	Camila Osorio	45	5
ESP	Nuria Párrizas Díaz	47	6
~~USA~~	~~Sloane Stephens~~	~~57~~	~~7~~
USA	Ann Li	58	8

- ^{1} Rankings as of February 21, 2022.

=== Other entrants ===
The following players received wildcards into the main draw:

- (United States) Emma Navarro
- (Mexico) Marcela Zacarías
- (Mexico) Renata Zarazúa

The following player received a special exempt into the main draw:

- (China) Wang Qiang

The following players received entry from the qualifying draw:

- (Italy) Sara Errani
- (Hungary) Dalma Gálfi
- (Germany) Jule Niemeier
- (France) Diane Parry
- (France) Harmony Tan
- (Bulgaria) Viktoriya Tomova

The following player received entry as a lucky loser:

- (Italy) Lucia Bronzetti
- (Australia) Seone Mendez

=== Withdrawals ===
Before the tournament

- (Ukraine) Anhelina Kalinina → replaced by (China) Wang Xinyu
- Anna Kalinskaya → replaced by (Italy) Lucia Bronzetti
- (Poland) Magda Linette → replaced by (Poland) Magdalena Fręch
- Anastasia Pavlyuchenkova → replaced by (Hungary) Panna Udvardy
- (Sweden) Rebecca Peterson → replaced by (United Kingdom) Heather Watson
- (Kazakhstan) Yulia Putintseva → replaced by (Czech Republic) Marie Bouzková
- (United Kingdom) Emma Raducanu → replaced by Kamilla Rakhimova
- (United States) Sloane Stephens → replaced by (Australia) Seone Mendez
- (Australia) Ajla Tomljanović → replaced by (Slovakia) Anna Karolína Schmiedlová

== Doubles main draw entrants ==
=== Seeds ===
Country	Player	Country	Player	Rank^{1}	Seed
FRA	Elixane Lechemia	USA	Ingrid Neel	146	1
	Anastasia Potapova		Kamilla Rakhimova	161	2
JPN	Nao Hibino	JPN	Miyu Kato	172	3
USA	Kaitlyn Christian		Lidziya Marozava	183	4

- Rankings as of February 21, 2022.

=== Other entrants ===
The following pairs received wildcards into the doubles main draw:

- (Mexico) Fernanda Contreras / (Mexico) Marcela Zacarías
- (Canada) Bianca Fernandez / (Canada) Leylah Fernandez

=== Withdrawals ===
Before the tournament

- (Sweden) Rebecca Peterson / Anastasia Potapova → replaced by Anastasia Potapova / Kamilla Rakhimova
- (Australia) Daria Saville / (Australia) Storm Sanders → replaced by (United States) Emina Bektas / (United Kingdom) Tara Moore
- (China) Xu Yifan / (China) Yang Zhaoxuan → replaced by (Egypt) Mayar Sherif / (United Kingdom) Heather Watson
