= 2022 US Open (tennis) =

- Date: August 29 – September 11
- Edition: 142nd
- Category: Grand Slam (ITF)
- Draw: 128S/32D
- Prize money: US$60,102,000
- Surface: Hard / outdoor
- Location: Flushing, New York, U.S.
- Venue: USTA Billie Jean King National Tennis Center

Champions

Men's singles
- (Spain) Carlos Alcaraz

Women's singles
- (Poland) Iga Świątek

Men's doubles
- (United States) Rajeev Ram / (United Kingdom) Joe Salisbury

Women's doubles
- (Czech Republic) Barbora Krejčiková / (Czech Republic) Kateřina Siniaková

Mixed doubles
- (Australia) Storm Sanders / (Australia) John Peers

Wheelchair men's singles
- (United Kingdom) Alfie Hewett

Wheelchair women's singles
- (Netherlands) Diede de Groot

Wheelchair quad singles
- (Netherlands) Niels Vink

Wheelchair men's doubles
- (Spain) Martín de la Puente / (France) Nicolas Peifer

Wheelchair women's doubles
- (Netherlands) Diede de Groot / (Netherlands) Aniek van Koot

Wheelchair quad doubles
- (Netherlands) Sam Schröder / (Netherlands) Niels Vink

Boys' singles
- (Spain) Martín Landaluce

Girls' singles
- (Philippines) Alexandra Eala

Boys' doubles
- (United States) Ozan Baris / (United States) Nishesh Basavareddy

Girls' doubles
- (Czech Republic) Lucie Havlíčková / (Russia) Diana Shnaider

Wheelchair boys' singles
- (United Kingdom) Ben Bartram

Wheelchair girls' singles
- (Brazil) Jade Moreira Lanai

Wheelchair boys' doubles
- (United Kingdom) Ben Bartram / (United Kingdom) Dahnon Ward

Wheelchair girls' doubles
- (Brazil) Jade Moreira Lanai / (United States) Maylee Phelps
- US Open

The 2022 US Open was the 142nd edition of tennis' US Open and the fourth and final tennis major (Grand Slam event) of the year. It was held on outdoor hard courts at the USTA Billie Jean King National Tennis Center in New York City.

Daniil Medvedev and Emma Raducanu were the men's and women's singles defending tournament champions. Raducanu lost to Alizé Cornet in the first round, while Medvedev lost to Nick Kyrgios in the fourth round.

Carlos Alcaraz and Iga Świątek won the men's and women's singles titles, respectively. Carlos became the first male player from the 2000s (born in 2003) and Iga became the second female player from the 2000s (born in 2001), to win the tournament's singles titles.

== Tournament ==
The 2022 US Open was the 142nd consecutive edition of the tournament and took place at the USTA Billie Jean King National Tennis Center in Flushing Meadows–Corona Park of Queens in New York City, New York, United States. The tournament was played on hard courts and took place over a series of 15 courts with Laykold surface, including the three existing main showcourts – Arthur Ashe Stadium, Louis Armstrong Stadium and Grandstand.

The tournament was run by the United States Tennis Association (USTA), supervised by the International Tennis Federation (ITF), and part of the 2022 ATP Tour (male tennis professionals) and the 2022 WTA Tour (female professional players) calendars under the Grand Slam category. The tournament consisted of both men's and women's singles and doubles draws, as singles draws remained in standard 128 person format in each category, as both doubles draws returned to standard 64 players. There were also singles and doubles events for both boys and girls (players under 18), which were part of the Grade A category of tournaments.

This was the first time at any tennis major that coaching was allowed from the stands.

== Broadcast ==
In the United States, the 2022 US Open was the eighth year in a row under an 11-year, $825 million contract with ESPN, in which the broadcaster held exclusive rights to the entire tournament and the US Open Series. This meant that the tournament was not available on broadcast television.

All tournament matches not cablecasted by ESPN, which focuses almost exclusively on the singles competitions, were available online on ESPN+.

== Singles players ==
- Men's singles

Champion		Runner-up	
(Spain) Carlos Alcaraz [3]		(Norway) Casper Ruud [5]	
Semifinals out
Karen Khachanov [27]		(United States) Frances Tiafoe [22]	
Quarterfinals out
(Australia) Nick Kyrgios [23]	(Italy) Matteo Berrettini [13]	(Italy) Jannik Sinner [11]	Andrey Rublev [9]
4th round out
Daniil Medvedev [1]	(Spain) Pablo Carreño Busta [12]	(Spain) Alejandro Davidovich Fokina	(France) Corentin Moutet (LL)
Ilya Ivashka	(Croatia) Marin Čilić [15]	(United Kingdom) Cameron Norrie [7]	(Spain) Rafael Nadal [2]
3rd round out
(China) Wu Yibing (Q)	(United States) J. J. Wolf (WC)	(Australia) Alex de Minaur [18]	(United Kingdom) Jack Draper
(Colombia) Daniel Elahi Galán (Q)	(United Kingdom) Andy Murray	(Argentina) Pedro Cachin	(United States) Tommy Paul [29]
(Italy) Lorenzo Musetti [26]	(United States) Brandon Nakashima	(United Kingdom) Dan Evans [20]	(United States) Jenson Brooksby
(Denmark) Holger Rune [28]	(Canada) Denis Shapovalov [19]	(Argentina) Diego Schwartzman [14]	(France) Richard Gasquet
2nd round out
(France) Arthur Rinderknech	(Portugal) Nuno Borges (Q)	(France) Benjamin Bonzi	(Chile) Alejandro Tabilo
(Kazakhstan) Alexander Bublik	(Chile) Cristian Garín	(Brazil) Thiago Monteiro	(Canada) Félix Auger-Aliassime [6]
(Australia) Jordan Thompson	(Hungary) Márton Fucsovics	(United States) Emilio Nava (WC)	(France) Hugo Grenier (LL)
(United States) Brandon Holt (Q)	(Netherlands) Botic van de Zandschulp [21]	(United States) Sebastian Korda	(Netherlands) Tim van Rijthoven
(Poland) Hubert Hurkacz [8]	(Netherlands) Gijs Brouwer (Q)	(Bulgaria) Grigor Dimitrov [17]	(United States) Christopher Eubanks (Q)
(Spain) Albert Ramos Viñolas	(Australia) James Duckworth	(Croatia) Borna Ćorić [25]/(PR)	(Argentina) Federico Coria
(Portugal) João Sousa	(United States) John Isner	(Spain) Roberto Carballés Baena	(South Korea) Kwon Soon-woo
(Australia) Alexei Popyrin	(Australia) Jason Kubler	(Serbia) Miomir Kecmanović [32]	(Italy) Fabio Fognini
1st round out
(United States) Stefan Kozlov	(France) Quentin Halys	(United States) Ben Shelton (WC)	(Georgia (country)) Nikoloz Basilashvili [31]
(Australia) Thanasi Kokkinakis	(France) Ugo Humbert (WC)	(Poland) Kamil Majchrzak	(Spain) Roberto Bautista Agut [16]
(Austria) Dominic Thiem (WC)	(Kazakhstan) Alexander Bublik	(Czech Republic) Jiří Lehečka	(Serbia) Filip Krajinović
(United States) Denis Kudla	(Slovakia) Alex Molčan	(Finland) Emil Ruusuvuori	(Switzerland) Alexander Ritschard (Q)
(Greece) Stefanos Tsitsipas [4]	(Italy) Lorenzo Sonego	(Japan) Yoshihito Nishioka	(United States) Maxime Cressy [30]
(Argentina) Francisco Cerúndolo [24]	(Australia) John Millman	(Argentina) Tomás Martín Etcheverry	(Chile) Nicolás Jarry (Q)
(United States) Taylor Fritz [10]	(Slovenia) Aljaž Bedene (PR)	(Switzerland) Stan Wawrinka (PR)	(Czech Republic) Tomáš Macháč (Q)
(Spain) Bernabé Zapata Miralles	(Argentina) Facundo Bagnis (Q)	(China) Zhang Zhizhen (Q)	(United Kingdom) Kyle Edmund (PR)
(Germany) Oscar Otte	(United States) Sam Querrey (WC)	(France) Adrian Mannarino	(Belgium) David Goffin
(United States) Steve Johnson	Pavel Kotov (Q)	(Spain) Pedro Martínez	(Germany) Daniel Altmaier
(Germany) Maximilian Marterer (Q)	(Slovakia) Norbert Gombos (Q)	(Australia) Christopher O'Connell	(Czech Republic) Jiří Veselý
(France) Enzo Couacaud (Q)	(Serbia) Dušan Lajović	(Netherlands) Tallon Griekspoor	(Argentina) Sebastián Báez
(France) Benoît Paire	(United States) Mackenzie McDonald	(Argentina) Federico Delbonis (Q)	(Germany) Peter Gojowczyk
(Switzerland) Marc-Andrea Hüsler	(Spain) Jaume Munar	(Spain) Fernando Verdasco (LL)	(Serbia) Laslo Djere
(United States) Jack Sock	(Chinese Taipei) Tseng Chun-hsin	(Sweden) Mikael Ymer	(United States) Marcos Giron
(United States) Learner Tien (WC)	(Japan) Taro Daniel	Aslan Karatsev	(Australia) Rinky Hijikata (WC)

- Women's singles

Champion		Runner-up	
(Poland) Iga Świątek [1]		(Tunisia) Ons Jabeur [5]	
Semifinals out
Aryna Sabalenka [6]		(France) Caroline Garcia [17]	
Quarterfinals out
(United States) Jessica Pegula [8]	(Czech Republic) Karolína Plíšková [22]	(United States) Coco Gauff [12]	(Australia) Ajla Tomljanović
4th round out
(Germany) Jule Niemeier	(Czech Republic) Petra Kvitová [21]	Victoria Azarenka [26]	(United States) Danielle Collins [19]
(China) Zhang Shuai	(United States) Alison Riske-Amritraj [29]	Veronika Kudermetova [18]	Liudmila Samsonova
3rd round out
(United States) Lauren Davis	(China) Zheng Qinwen	(Spain) Garbiñe Muguruza [9]	(China) Yuan Yue (Q)
(Croatia) Petra Martić	(Switzerland) Belinda Bencic [13]	(France) Alizé Cornet	(France) Clara Burel (Q)
(Canada) Rebecca Marino	(United States) Madison Keys [12]	(Canada) Bianca Andreescu	(China) Wang Xiyu
(United States) Shelby Rogers [31]	(Hungary) Dalma Gálfi	(Serbia) Aleksandra Krunić	(United States) Serena Williams (PR)
2nd round out
(United States) Sloane Stephens	Ekaterina Alexandrova [28]	(Kazakhstan) Yulia Putintseva	Anastasia Potapova
(Czech Republic) Linda Fruhvirtová (Q)	(Ukraine) Anhelina Kalinina	(Romania) Irina-Camelia Begu	Aliaksandra Sasnovich
(Spain) Paula Badosa [4]	(Ukraine) Marta Kostyuk	(Czech Republic) Marie Bouzková	(Romania) Sorana Cîrstea
(Czech Republic) Kateřina Siniaková	(Spain) Cristina Bucșa (Q)	(Belgium) Alison Van Uytvanck	(Estonia) Kaia Kanepi
(Ukraine) Daria Snigur (Q)	(Slovakia) Anna Karolína Schmiedlová	(Italy) Camila Giorgi	(Romania) Elena-Gabriela Ruse
(Brazil) Beatriz Haddad Maia [15]	Anna Kalinskaya	(Colombia) Camila Osorio	(Greece) Maria Sakkari [3]
(United States) Elizabeth Mandlik (WC)	(Slovakia) Viktória Kužmová (Q)	(Belgium) Maryna Zanevska	(United Kingdom) Harriet Dart
(Canada) Leylah Fernandez [14]	(Czech Republic) Barbora Krejčíková [23]	Evgeniya Rodina (PR)	(Estonia) Anett Kontaveit [2]
1st round out
(Italy) Jasmine Paolini	(Belgium) Greet Minnen	(Italy) Lucia Bronzetti	(United States) Peyton Stearns (WC)
(United States) Amanda Anisimova [24]	(United States) Sofia Kenin (WC)	(United States) Claire Liu	(Latvia) Jeļena Ostapenko [16]
(Denmark) Clara Tauson	(China) Wang Xinyu	(United States) Bernarda Pera	Erika Andreeva (Q)
(Belgium) Elise Mertens [32]	(Australia) Jaimee Fourlis (WC)	(Italy) Elisabetta Cocciaretto (Q)	(Switzerland) Viktorija Golubic (Q)
(Ukraine) Lesia Tsurenko	Varvara Gracheva	(Egypt) Mayar Sherif	(United States) Ashlyn Krueger (WC)
(Poland) Magda Linette	(Czech Republic) Linda Nosková (Q)	(Germany) Laura Siegemund (PR)	(Germany) Andrea Petkovic
(United Kingdom) Emma Raducanu [11]	(United States) Taylor Townsend (PR)	(Slovenia) Kaja Juvan	(Japan) Naomi Osaka
(Kazakhstan) Elena Rybakina [25]	(United States) Venus Williams (WC)	(Czech Republic) Tereza Martincová	(United States) Catherine Harrison (Q)
(Romania) Simona Halep [7]	(Poland) Magdalena Fręch	(Argentina) Nadia Podoroska (PR)	(Switzerland) Jil Teichmann [30]
(Ukraine) Dayana Yastremska	(Hungary) Anna Bondár	(Australia) Daria Saville	(France) Léolia Jeanjean (Q)
(Croatia) Ana Konjuh	(France) Harmony Tan (WC)	(Sweden) Rebecca Peterson	Kamilla Rakhimova (LL)
(United States) Eleana Yu (WC)	(United States) Ann Li	(France) Diane Parry	(Germany) Tatjana Maria
(United States) Madison Brengle	(Slovenia) Tamara Zidanšek	(Spain) Sara Sorribes Tormo	(Netherlands) Arantxa Rus
(Croatia) Donna Vekić	(United States) CoCo Vandeweghe (WC)	(Spain) Nuria Párrizas Díaz	Daria Kasatkina [10]
(France) Océane Dodin	(Czech Republic) Sára Bejlek (Q)	Elina Avanesyan (Q)	(Mexico) Fernanda Contreras Gómez (Q)
(Italy) Martina Trevisan [27]	(Czech Republic) Karolína Muchová (PR)	(Montenegro) Danka Kovinić	(Romania) Jaqueline Cristian

== Events ==
=== Men's singles ===
- (Spain) Carlos Alcaraz def. (Norway) Casper Ruud, 6–4, 2–6, 7–6^{(7–1)}, 6–3

=== Women's singles ===
- (Poland) Iga Świątek def. (Tunisia) Ons Jabeur, 6–2, 7–6^{(7–5)}

=== Men's doubles ===
- (United States) Rajeev Ram / (United Kingdom) Joe Salisbury def. (Netherlands) Wesley Koolhof / (United Kingdom) Neal Skupski, 7–6^{(7–4)}, 7–5

=== Women's doubles ===
- (Czech Republic) Barbora Krejčiková / (Czech Republic) Kateřina Siniaková def. (United States) Caty McNally / (United States) Taylor Townsend, 3–6, 7–5, 6–1

=== Mixed doubles ===
- (Australia) Storm Sanders / (Australia) John Peers def. (Belgium) Kirsten Flipkens / (France) Édouard Roger-Vasselin, 4–6, 6–4, [10–7]

=== Wheelchair men's singles ===
- (United Kingdom) Alfie Hewett def. (Japan) Shingo Kunieda, 7–6^{(7–2)}, 6–1

=== Wheelchair women's singles ===
- (Netherlands) Diede de Groot def. (Japan) Yui Kamiji, 3–6, 6–1, 6–1

=== Wheelchair quad singles ===
- (Netherlands) Niels Vink def. (Netherlands) Sam Schröder, 7–5, 6–3

=== Wheelchair men's doubles ===
- (Spain) Martín de la Puente / (France) Nicolas Peifer def. (United Kingdom) Alfie Hewett / (United Kingdom) Gordon Reid, 4–6, 7–5, [10–6]

=== Wheelchair women's doubles ===
- (Netherlands) Diede de Groot / (Netherlands) Aniek van Koot def. (Japan) Yui Kamiji / (South Africa) Kgothatso Montjane, 6–2, 6–2

=== Wheelchair quad doubles ===
- (Netherlands) Sam Schröder / (Netherlands) Niels Vink def. (Canada) Robert Shaw / (United States) David Wagner, 6–1, 6–2

=== Boys' singles ===
- (Spain) Martín Landaluce def. (Belgium) Gilles-Arnaud Bailly, 7–6^{(7–3)}, 5–7, 6–2

=== Girls' singles ===
- (Philippines) Alexandra Eala def. (Czech Republic) Lucie Havlíčková, 6–2, 6–4

=== Boys' doubles ===
- (United States) Ozan Baris / (United States) Nishesh Basavareddy def. (Switzerland) Dylan Dietrich / (Bolivia) Juan Carlos Prado Ángelo, 6–1, 6–1

=== Girls' doubles ===
- (Czech Republic) Lucie Havlíčková / Diana Shnaider def. (Germany) Carolina Kuhl / (Germany) Ella Seidel, 6–3, 6–2

=== Wheelchair boys' singles ===
- (United Kingdom) Ben Bartram def. (United Kingdom) Dahnon Ward, 6–4, 6–1

=== Wheelchair girls' singles ===
- (Brazil) Jade Moreira Lanai def. (Japan) Yuma Takamuro, 7–5, 2–6, 7–6^{[10–5]}

=== Wheelchair boys' doubles ===
- (United Kingdom) Ben Bartram / (United Kingdom) Dahnon Ward def. (Netherlands) Ivar van Rijt / (Australia) Saalim Naser, 6–4, 6–3

=== Wheelchair girls' doubles ===
- (Brazil) Jade Moreira Lanai / (United States) Maylee Phelps def. (United States) Lily Lautenschlager / (United Kingdom) Ruby Bishop, 6–0, 6–0

== Point and prize money distribution ==
=== Point distribution ===
Below is a series of tables for each competition showing each event's ranking points on offer.

Event	W	F	SF	QF	R4	R3	R2	R1	Q	Q3	Q2	Q1
Men's singles	2000	1200	720	360	180	90	45	10	25	16	8	0
Men's doubles	2000	1200	720	360	180	90	0	—	—	—	—	—
Women's singles	2000	1300	780	430	240	130	70	10	40	30	20	2
Women's doubles	2000	1300	780	430	240	130	10	—	—	—	—	—

==== Wheelchair ====
Event	W	F	SF/3rd	QF/4th
Singles	800	500	375	100
Doubles	800	500	100	—
Quad singles	800	500	375	100
Quad doubles	800	100	—	—

==== Junior ====
Event	W	F	SF	QF	Round of 16	Round of 32	Q	Q3
Boys' singles	1000	600	370	200	100	45	30	20
Girls' singles	1000	600	370	200	100	45	30	20
Boys' doubles	750	450	275	150	75	—N/a	—N/a	—N/a
Girls' doubles	750	450	275	150	75	—N/a	—N/a	—N/a

=== Prize money ===
The total prize money for the 2022 US Open topped $60 million ($60,102,000) for the first time, 4.59% more than the 2021 edition and maintained the tournament's status as having the richest prize purse of all Grand Slams.

Event	W	F	SF	QF	Round of 16	Round of 32	Round of 64	Round of 128	Q3	Q2	Q1
Singles	$2,600,000	$1,300,000	$705,000	$445,000	$278,000	$188,000	$121,000	$80,000	$44,000	$33,600	$21,100
Doubles	$688,000	$344,000	$172,000	$97,500	$56,400	$35,800	$21,300	N/A	N/A	N/A	N/A
Mixed doubles	$163,000	$81,500	$42,000	$23,200	$14,200	$8,300	N/A	N/A	N/A	N/A	N/A

== Tennis Plays for Peace exhibition ==
On August 10, the tournament announced it would host an exhibition to support Ukraine during the Russian invasion. The exhibition matches took place on August 24, with all proceeds going to GlobalGiving, the international non-profit identified by Tennis Plays for Peace. Brothers John and Patrick McEnroe hosted and served as chair umpires, with John playing one match. The exhibition raised US$1.2 million in proceeds.

The matches, all of which were played by a first-to-ten-points basis, were as follows:

- (Poland) Iga Świątek / (Spain) Rafael Nadal defeated (United States) Coco Gauff / (United States) John McEnroe, [10–8]
- (United States) Jessica Pegula / (United States) Ben Shelton defeated (Canada) Leylah Fernandez / (Canada) Félix Auger-Aliassime, [10–8]
- (Greece) Maria Sakkari / (Greece) Stefanos Tsitsipas defeated (Ukraine) Katarina Zavatska / (Italy) Matteo Berrettini, [10–7]
- (United States) Taylor Fritz / (United States) Tommy Paul defeated (Spain) Carlos Alcaraz / (United States) Frances Tiafoe, [10–9]
- (Ukraine) Dayana Yastremska / (United States) Frances Tiafoe defeated (Ukraine) Daria Snigur / (United States) Sebastian Korda, [10–4]

Victoria Azarenka of Belarus was also scheduled to attend, but the tournament later disinvited her for her country's support of Russia, in addition to having received objections from Ukrainian players.

Preceded by 2022 Wimbledon Championships	Grand Slams	Succeeded by 2023 Australian Open
