= 2022 Monterrey Open – Singles =

Singles
- 2022 Monterrey Open

Final
- Champion: (Canada) Leylah Fernandez
- Runner-up: (Colombia) Camila Osorio
- Score: 6–7^{(5–7)}, 6–4, 7–6^{(7–3)}

Details
- Draw: 32
- Seeds: 8

Events
| Singles | Doubles |
| ← 2021 · | Monterrey Open | · 2023 → |

Defending champion Leylah Fernandez defeated Camila Osorio in the final, 6–7^{(5–7)}, 6–4, 7–6^{(7–3)} to win the singles tennis title at the 2022 Monterrey Open. Fernandez saved five championship points en route to the title, all in the final set.

Initially, top seed Elina Svitolina from Ukraine, refused to play in protest of the Russian invasion of Ukraine, as she was due to face Russian player Anastasia Potapova in the first round. The match eventually went ahead after the Women's Tennis Association announced that Russian and Belarusian players would only be allowed to play under a neutral flag.

== Seeds ==
1. (Ukraine) Elina Svitolina (quarterfinals)
2. (Canada) Leylah Fernandez (champion)
3. (United States) Madison Keys (first round)
4. (Spain) Sara Sorribes Tormo (quarterfinals)
5. (Colombia) Camila Osorio (final)
6. (Spain) Nuria Párrizas Díaz (semifinals)
7. (United States) Sloane Stephens (withdrew)
8. (United States) Ann Li (first round)

== Draw ==
=== Key ===
- Q = Qualifier
- WC = Wild card
- LL = Lucky loser
- Alt = Alternate
- SE = Special exempt
- PR = Protected ranking
- ITF = ITF entry
- JE = Junior exempt
- w/o = Walkover
- r = Retired
- d = Defaulted
- SR = Special ranking

=== Finals ===
Semifinals
5 | (Colombia) Camila Osorio | 6 | 6
6 | (Spain) Nuria Párrizas Díaz | 4 | 4
(Brazil) Beatriz Haddad Maia | 1 | 4
2 | (Canada) Leylah Fernandez | 6 | 6

Final
5 | (Colombia) Camila Osorio | 7^{7} | 4 | 6^{3}
2 | (Canada) Leylah Fernandez | 6^{5} | 6 | 7^{7}

=== Top half ===
First round
1 | (Ukraine) E Svitolina | 6 | 6
A Potapova | 2 | 1
Q | (France) D Parry | 4 | 0
Q | (Bulgaria) V Tomova | 6 | 6
WC | (United States) E Navarro | 1 | 7^{7} | 3
WC | (Mexico) M Zacarías | 6 | 6^{3} | 6
(Poland) M Fręch | 3 | 6^{6}
5 | (Colombia) C Osorio | 6 | 7^{8}
4 | (Spain) S Sorribes Tormo | 7 | 6^{2} | 6
K Rakhimova | 5 | 7^{7} | 1
WC | (Mexico) R Zarazúa | 0 | 0^{r}
Q | (France) H Tan | 6 | 1
(United Kingdom) H Watson | 6 | 2 | 7^{7}
Q | (Germany) J Niemeier | 3 | 6 | 6^{4}
(Japan) M Doi | 2 | 1
6 | (Spain) N Párrizas Díaz | 6 | 6

Second round
1 | (Ukraine) E Svitolina | 7^{7} | 3 | 6
Q | (Bulgaria) V Tomova | 6^{3} | 6 | 2
WC | (Mexico) M Zacarías | 6^{2} | 3
5 | (Colombia) C Osorio | 7^{7} | 6
4 | (Spain) S Sorribes Tormo | 6 | 6
Q | (France) H Tan | 2 | 2
(United Kingdom) H Watson | 4 | 6^{2}
6 | (Spain) N Párrizas Díaz | 6 | 7^{7}

Quarterfinals
1 | (Ukraine) E Svitolina | 6 | 5 | 6^{5}
5 | (Colombia) C Osorio | 1 | 7 | 7^{7}
4 | (Spain) S Sorribes Tormo | 3 | 6 | 4
6 | (Spain) N Párrizas Díaz | 6 | 1 | 6

Semifinals
5 | (Colombia) C Osorio | 6 | 6
6 | (Spain) N Párrizas Díaz | 4 | 4

=== Bottom half ===
First round
8 | (United States) A Li | 2 | 1
(China) Xin Wang | 6 | 6
(Hungary) P Udvardy | 6 | 1 | 5
(Brazil) B Haddad Maia | 1 | 6 | 7
Q | (Italy) S Errani | 6 | 2 | 4
(Czech Republic) M Bouzková | 4 | 6 | 6
(Croatia) P Martić | 5 | 7^{7} | 6
3 | (United States) M Keys | 7 | 6^{3} | 3
LL | (Australia) S Mendez | 1 | 7^{7} | 4
(Egypt) M Sherif | 6 | 6^{2} | 6
SE | (China) Q Wang | 6^{0} | 6 | 6
Q | (Hungary) D Gálfi | 7^{7} | 1 | 4
(China) Q Zheng | 6 | 6
LL | (Italy) L Bronzetti | 2 | 3
(Slovakia) AK Schmiedlová | 2 | 2
2 | (Canada) L Fernandez | 6 | 6

Second round
(China) Xin Wang | 2 | 2
(Brazil) B Haddad Maia | 6 | 6
(Czech Republic) M Bouzková | 6 | 6
(Croatia) P Martić | 4 | 2
(Egypt) M Sherif | 0 | 7^{7} | 3
SE | (China) Q Wang | 6 | 6^{2} | 6
(China) Q Zheng | 1 | 6 | 6^{3}
2 | (Canada) L Fernandez | 6 | 4 | 7^{7}

Quarterfinals
(Brazil) B Haddad Maia | 4 | 6 | 7^{9}
(Czech Republic) M Bouzková | 6 | 4 | 6^{7}
SE | (China) Q Wang | 6^{4} | 4
2 | (Canada) L Fernandez | 7^{7} | 6

Semifinals
(Brazil) B Haddad Maia | 1 | 4
2 | (Canada) L Fernandez | 6 | 6

== Qualifying ==
=== Seeds ===
1. (France) Diane Parry (qualified)
2. (France) Harmony Tan (qualified)
3. (Bulgaria) Viktoriya Tomova (qualified)
4. Kamilla Rakhimova (moved to main draw)
5. (Hungary) Dalma Gálfi (qualified)
6. (Italy) Lucia Bronzetti (qualifying competition, lucky loser)
7. (Germany) Jule Niemeier (qualified)
8. (United States) Hailey Baptiste (qualifying competition)
9. (Slovakia) Viktória Kužmová (first round, retired)
10. (Spain) Rebeka Masarova (first round)
11. (Italy) Sara Errani (qualified)
12. (United States) Christina McHale (first round)

=== Qualifiers ===
1. (France) Diane Parry
2. (France) Harmony Tan
3. (Bulgaria) Viktoriya Tomova
4. (Germany) Jule Niemeier
5. (Hungary) Dalma Gálfi
6. (Italy) Sara Errani

=== Lucky losers ===
1. (Italy) Lucia Bronzetti
2. (Australia) Seone Mendez

=== Qualifying draw ===
==== First qualifier ====
First round
1 | (France) Diane Parry | 6 | 3 | 6
Olga Govortsova | 3 | 6 | 2
WC | (Mexico) María Portillo Ramírez | 4 | 6 | 3
8 | (United States) Hailey Baptiste | 6 | 2 | 6

Qualifying competition
1 | (France) Diane Parry | 6 | 6
8 | (United States) Hailey Baptiste | 2 | 1

==== Second qualifier ====
First round
2 | (France) Harmony Tan | 6 | 6
(Japan) Nao Hibino | 3 | 1
Alt | (Australia) Seone Mendez | 6 | 3 | 6
10 | (Spain) Rebeka Masarova | 4 | 6 | 0

Qualifying competition
2 | (France) Harmony Tan | 6 | 7
Alt | (Australia) Seone Mendez | 3 | 5

==== Third qualifier ====
First round
3 | (Bulgaria) Viktoriya Tomova | 7^{7} | 6
(China) Yuan Yue | 6^{3} | 2
WC | (Mexico) Fernanda Contreras | 6 | 6
12 | (United States) Christina McHale | 3 | 4

Qualifying competition
3 | (Bulgaria) Viktoriya Tomova | 6 | 6
WC | (Mexico) Fernanda Contreras | 1 | 4

==== Fourth qualifier ====
First round
Alt | (United States) Catherine Harrison | 6 | 7^{7}
(Australia) Storm Sanders | 4 | 6^{2}
WC | (Canada) Bianca Fernandez | 3 | 2
7 | (Germany) Jule Niemeier | 6 | 6

Qualifying competition
Alt | (United States) Catherine Harrison | 3 | 3
7 | (Germany) Jule Niemeier | 6 | 6

==== Fifth qualifier ====
First round
5 | (Hungary) Dalma Gálfi | 6 | 6
(Argentina) Paula Ormaechea | 3 | 0
WC | (Andorra) Victoria Jiménez Kasintseva | 6 | 2
9 | (Slovakia) Viktória Kužmová | 4 | 1^{r}

Qualifying competition
5 | (Hungary) Dalma Gálfi | 6 | 0
WC | (Andorra) Victoria Jiménez Kasintseva | 1 | 0^{r}

==== Sixth qualifier ====
First round
6 | (Italy) Lucia Bronzetti | 4 | 6 | 6
(Brazil) Laura Pigossi | 6 | 4 | 3
(United States) Caty McNally | 4 | 7^{7} | 1
11 | (Italy) Sara Errani | 6 | 6^{2} | 6

Qualifying competition
6 | (Italy) Lucia Bronzetti | 3 | 1
11 | (Italy) Sara Errani | 6 | 6
