= 2022 US Open – Women's doubles =

Women's doubles
- 2022 US Open

Final
- Champions: (Czech Republic) Barbora Krejčíková (Czech Republic) Kateřina Siniaková
- Runners-up: (United States) Caty McNally (United States) Taylor Townsend
- Score: 3–6, 7–5, 6–1

Details
- Draw: 64
- Seeds: 16

Events
Singles	men	women		boys	girls
Doubles	men	women	mixed	boys	girls
WC Singles	men	women	quad
WC Doubles	men	women	quad
Legends	men	women	mixed
- US Open

Barbora Krejčíková and Kateřina Siniaková defeated Caty McNally and Taylor Townsend in the final, 3–6, 7–5, 6–1 to win the women's doubles tennis title at the 2022 US Open. With the win, they became the first women's pair (and the third and fourth women overall, after Gigi Fernández and Pam Shriver) to complete the career Super Slam in doubles. It was their sixth major title together.

Samantha Stosur and Zhang Shuai were the defending champions, but did not compete together. Stosur partnered Latisha Chan, but lost to Miyu Kato and Aldila Sutjiadi in the first round. Zhang partnered Marta Kostyuk, but lost to Desirae Krawczyk and Demi Schuurs in the third round.

Siniaková regained the WTA number 1 doubles ranking at the end of the tournament. Coco Gauff, Elise Mertens, Jeļena Ostapenko and Giuliana Olmos were also in contention for the top ranking.

At the time, this tournament marked the final professional doubles appearance for 14-time major doubles champion, three-time Olympic doubles gold medalist, and former doubles world No. 1 Serena Williams; partnering with her sister Venus Williams, she lost in the first round to Lucie Hradecká and Linda Nosková. Serena Williams would later return to tennis at the 2026 Queen's Club Championships.

This was the first edition of US Open to feature a 10-point tie-break, when the score reaches six games all in the deciding set. Lyudmyla Kichenok and Ostapenko defeated Panna Udvardy and Tamara Zidanšek in the first round in the first women's doubles main-draw 10-point tie-break at US Open.

== Seeds ==
1. Veronika Kudermetova / (Belgium) Elise Mertens (second round, withdrew)
2. (United States) Coco Gauff / (United States) Jessica Pegula (first round)
3. (Czech Republic) Barbora Krejčíková / (Czech Republic) Kateřina Siniaková (champions)
4. (Ukraine) Lyudmyla Kichenok / (Latvia) Jeļena Ostapenko (third round)
5. (Canada) Gabriela Dabrowski / (Mexico) Giuliana Olmos (quarterfinals)
6. (United States) Desirae Krawczyk / (Netherlands) Demi Schuurs (quarterfinals)
7. (China) Xu Yifan / (China) Yang Zhaoxuan (third round)
8. (Kazakhstan) Anna Danilina / (Brazil) Beatriz Haddad Maia (third round)
9. (United States) Asia Muhammad / (Japan) Ena Shibahara (third round)
10. (United States) Nicole Melichar-Martinez / (Australia) Ellen Perez (semifinals)
11. (Ukraine) Marta Kostyuk / (China) Zhang Shuai (third round)
12. (United States) Caroline Dolehide / (Australia) Storm Sanders (semifinals)
13. (Chile) Alexa Guarachi / (Slovenia) Andreja Klepač (third round)
14. (France) Caroline Garcia / (France) Kristina Mladenovic (quarterfinals)
15. (Japan) Shuko Aoyama / (Chinese Taipei) Chan Hao-ching (third round)
16. (Poland) Alicja Rosolska / (New Zealand) Erin Routliffe (second round)

Click on the seed number of a player to go to their draw section.

== Draw ==
Key

- Q = Qualifier
- WC = Wild card
- LL = Lucky loser
- Alt = Alternate
- ITF = ITF entry
- PR = Protected ranking
- SR = Special ranking
- SE = Special exempt
- JE = Junior exempt
- JR = Junior Accelerator Programme entrant
- CO = College Accelerator Programme entrant
- NG = Next Gen Accelerator Program entrant
- w/o = Walkover
- r = Retired
- d = Defaulted

=== Finals ===
Quarterfinals
(Belgium) Kirsten Flipkens (Spain) Sara Sorribes Tormo	7^{7}	4	4
10	(United States) Nicole Melichar-Martinez (Australia) Ellen Perez	6^{5}	6	6
3	(Czech Republic) Barbora Krejčíková (Czech Republic) Kateřina Siniaková	6	6^{4}	6
5	(Canada) Gabriela Dabrowski (Mexico) Giuliana Olmos	3	7^{7}	3
12	(United States) Caroline Dolehide (Australia) Storm Sanders	6	6
14	(France) Caroline Garcia (France) Kristina Mladenovic	3	3
6	(United States) Desirae Krawczyk (Netherlands) Demi Schuurs	3	1
(United States) Caty McNally (United States) Taylor Townsend	6	6

Semifinals
10	(United States) Nicole Melichar-Martinez (Australia) Ellen Perez	3	7^{7}	3
3	(Czech Republic) Barbora Krejčíková (Czech Republic) Kateřina Siniaková	6	6^{4}	6
12	(United States) Caroline Dolehide (Australia) Storm Sanders	6	3	3
(United States) Caty McNally (United States) Taylor Townsend	1	6	6

Final
3	(Czech Republic) Barbora Krejčíková (Czech Republic) Kateřina Siniaková	3	7	6
(United States) Caty McNally (United States) Taylor Townsend	6	5	1

=== Top half ===
==== Section 1 ====
First round
1	V Kudermetova (Belgium) E Mertens	6	6
A Kalinskaya (Croatia) D Vekić	1	2
(Belgium) K Flipkens (Spain) S Sorribes Tormo	6	6
(Japan) E Hozumi (Japan) M Ninomiya	2	1
(Czech Republic) L Hradecká (Czech Republic) L Nosková	7^{7}	6
WC	(United States) S Williams (United States) V Williams	6^{5}	4
Alt	(United Kingdom) A Barnett (United Kingdom) O Nicholls	4	5
13	(Chile) A Guarachi (Slovenia) A Klepač	6	7
10	(United States) N Melichar-Martinez (Australia) E Perez	6	6
(United States) M Brengle (United States) C Liu	4	0
PR	(Netherlands) R van der Hoek (Belgium) A Van Uytvanck	3	4
WC	(United States) R Brantmeier (United States) C Ngounoue	6	6
(Romania) I-C Begu (Romania) R Olaru	6	3	3
(Spain) A Bolsova (Norway) U Eikeri	4	6	6
(Serbia) A Krunić (Poland) M Linette	2	6^{4}
8	(Kazakhstan) A Danilina (Brazil) B Haddad Maia	6	7^{7}

Second round
1	V Kudermetova (Belgium) E Mertens
(Belgium) K Flipkens (Spain) S Sorribes Tormo	w/o
(Czech Republic) L Hradecká (Czech Republic) L Nosková	6^{3}	7	3
13	(Chile) A Guarachi (Slovenia) A Klepač	7^{7}	5	6
10	(United States) N Melichar-Martinez (Australia) E Perez	6^{5}	6	6
WC	(United States) R Brantmeier (United States) C Ngounoue	7^{7}	2	2
(Spain) A Bolsova (Norway) U Eikeri	1	5
8	(Kazakhstan) A Danilina (Brazil) B Haddad Maia	6	7

Third round
(Belgium) K Flipkens (Spain) S Sorribes Tormo	7^{7}	2	6
13	(Chile) A Guarachi (Slovenia) A Klepač	6^{5}	6	1
10	(United States) N Melichar-Martinez (Australia) E Perez	6	6
8	(Kazakhstan) A Danilina (Brazil) B Haddad Maia	3	3

Quarterfinals
(Belgium) K Flipkens (Spain) S Sorribes Tormo	7^{7}	4	4
10	(United States) N Melichar-Martinez (Australia) E Perez	6^{5}	6	6

==== Section 2 ====
First round
3	(Czech Republic) B Krejčíková (Czech Republic) K Siniaková	6	1	6
(Romania) M Niculescu (Romania) E-G Ruse	3	6	3
WC	(United States) E Mandlik (United States) K Scott	7^{8}	3	3
(Romania) A Bogdan (United States) S Santamaria	6^{6}	6	6
(United States) K Christian; L Marozava	6^{5}	6	6
(United States) A Li (Denmark) C Tauson	7^{7}	4	4
WC	(United States) R Montgomery (United States) C Vandeweghe	4	3
15	(Japan) S Aoyama (Chinese Taipei) H-c Chan	6	6
9	(United States) A Muhammad (Japan) E Shibahara	6	6
V Gracheva (Poland) K Piter	2	1
Alt	(United States) C Harrison (United States) I Neel	6	6
(United Kingdom) H Dart; L Samsonova	4	4
WC	(United States) H Baptiste (United States) W Osuigwe	6	2	6
PR	(United States) S Kenin (Australia) A Tomljanović	3	6	4
WC	(United States) A Krueger (United States) P Stearns	2	1
5	(Canada) G Dabrowski (Mexico) G Olmos	6	6

Second round
3	(Czech Republic) B Krejčíková (Czech Republic) K Siniaková	6	6
(Romania) A Bogdan (United States) S Santamaria	2	2
(United States) K Christian; L Marozava	2	2
15	(Japan) S Aoyama (Chinese Taipei) H-c Chan	6	6
9	(United States) A Muhammad (Japan) E Shibahara	6	6
Alt	(United States) C Harrison (United States) I Neel	2	4
WC	(United States) H Baptiste (United States) W Osuigwe	1	4
5	(Canada) G Dabrowski (Mexico) G Olmos	6	6

Third round
3	(Czech Republic) B Krejčíková (Czech Republic) K Siniaková	6	6
15	(Japan) S Aoyama (Chinese Taipei) H-c Chan	2	0
9	(United States) A Muhammad (Japan) E Shibahara	3	6	6^{8}
5	(Canada) G Dabrowski (Mexico) G Olmos	6	3	7^{10}

Quarterfinals
3	(Czech Republic) B Krejčíková (Czech Republic) K Siniaková	6	6^{4}	6
5	(Canada) G Dabrowski (Mexico) G Olmos	3	7^{7}	3

=== Bottom half ===
==== Section 3 ====
First round
7	(China) Y Xu (China) Z Yang	3	6	6
Alt	(China) X Han; E Rodina	6	1	2
PR	(Kazakhstan) Y Putintseva (Belgium) Y Wickmayer	6	6^{7}	1
(Sweden) R Peterson; A Potapova	4	7^{9}	6
(Georgia (country)) N Dzalamidze; K Rakhimova	6	4	5
WC	(United States) S Chang (United States) A Kulikov	4	6	7
(Italy) L Bronzetti (Colombia) C Osorio	0	0
12	(United States) C Dolehide (Australia) S Sanders	6	6
14	(France) C Garcia (France) K Mladenovic	6	1	6
E Alexandrova; Y Sizikova	3	6	3
(Czech Republic) T Martincová; A Panova	5	6^{2}
PR	(Argentina) N Podoroska (Egypt) M Sherif	7	7^{7}
Alt	(China) Xin Wang (China) L Zhu	5	6	4
(Hungary) A Bondár (Belgium) G Minnen	7	3	6
(Hungary) P Udvardy (Slovenia) T Zidanšek	3	7^{7}	6^{6}
4	(Ukraine) L Kichenok (Latvia) J Ostapenko	6	6^{5}	7^{10}

Second round
7	(China) Y Xu (China) Z Yang	6	6
(Sweden) R Peterson; A Potapova	3	4
WC	(United States) S Chang (United States) A Kulikov	6^{7}	6	4
12	(United States) C Dolehide (Australia) S Sanders	7^{9}	4	6
14	(France) C Garcia (France) K Mladenovic	6	6
PR	(Argentina) N Podoroska (Egypt) M Sherif	3	4
(Hungary) A Bondár (Belgium) G Minnen	6	2	6^{3}
4	(Ukraine) L Kichenok (Latvia) J Ostapenko	0	6	7^{10}

Third round
7	(China) Y Xu (China) Z Yang	2	3
12	(United States) C Dolehide (Australia) S Sanders	6	6
14	(France) C Garcia (France) K Mladenovic	6	6
4	(Ukraine) L Kichenok (Latvia) J Ostapenko	4	2

Quarterfinals
12	(United States) C Dolehide (Australia) S Sanders	6	6
14	(France) C Garcia (France) K Mladenovic	3	3

==== Section 4 ====
First round
6	(United States) D Krawczyk (Netherlands) D Schuurs	7^{7}	6
(France) A Cornet (Switzerland) J Teichmann	6^{5}	4
(Chinese Taipei) L Chan (Australia) S Stosur	1	3
(Japan) M Kato (Indonesia) A Sutjiadi	6	6
(Slovakia) T Mihalíková; A Sasnovich	6	6
(Romania) I Bara (Georgia (country)) E Gorgodze	4	1
(Georgia (country)) O Kalashnikova (Ukraine) N Kichenok	4	4
11	(Ukraine) M Kostyuk (China) S Zhang	6	6
16	(Poland) A Rosolska (New Zealand) E Routliffe	6	3	6
(Germany) V Heisen (Poland) K Kawa	2	6	1
(Spain) N Párrizas Díaz (Netherlands) A Rus	3	4
(United States) C McNally (United States) T Townsend	6	6
(Hungary) D Gálfi (United States) B Pera	6	3	6
(Belgium) M Zanevska (Belgium) K Zimmermann	1	6	3
(Canada) L Fernandez (Australia) D Saville	3	7	7^{10}
2	(United States) C Gauff (United States) J Pegula	6	5	6^{5}

Second round
6	(United States) D Krawczyk (Netherlands) D Schuurs	5	6	7^{10}
(Japan) M Kato (Indonesia) A Sutjiadi	7	1	6^{3}
(Slovakia) T Mihalíková; A Sasnovich	1	2
11	(Ukraine) M Kostyuk (China) S Zhang	6	6
16	(Poland) A Rosolska (New Zealand) E Routliffe	6^{5}	6	3
(United States) C McNally (United States) T Townsend	7^{7}	3	6
(Hungary) D Gálfi (United States) B Pera	6^{5}	6	7^{12}
(Canada) L Fernandez (Australia) D Saville	7^{7}	3	6^{10}

Third round
6	(United States) D Krawczyk (Netherlands) D Schuurs	6	6
11	(Ukraine) M Kostyuk (China) S Zhang	4	4
(United States) C McNally (United States) T Townsend	6	6
(Hungary) D Gálfi (United States) B Pera	4	4

Quarterfinals
6	(United States) D Krawczyk (Netherlands) D Schuurs	3	1
(United States) C McNally (United States) T Townsend	6	6

== Other entry information ==
=== Wild cards ===
- (United States) Hailey Baptiste / (United States) Whitney Osuigwe
- (United States) Reese Brantmeier / (United States) Clervie Ngounoue
- (United States) Sophie Chang / (United States) Angela Kulikov
- (United States) Ashlyn Krueger / (United States) Peyton Stearns
- (United States) Elizabeth Mandlik / (United States) Katrina Scott
- (United States) Robin Montgomery / (United States) CoCo Vandeweghe
- (United States) Serena Williams / (United States) Venus Williams

=== Protected ranking ===
- (United States) Sofia Kenin / (Australia) Ajla Tomljanović
- (Argentina) Nadia Podoroska / (Egypt) Mayar Sherif
- (Kazakhstan) Yulia Putintseva / (Belgium) Yanina Wickmayer
- (Netherlands) Rosalie van der Hoek / (Belgium) Alison Van Uytvanck

=== Alternates ===
- (United Kingdom) Alicia Barnett / (United Kingdom) Olivia Nicholls
- (United States) Catherine Harrison / (United States) Ingrid Neel
- (China) Han Xinyun / Evgeniya Rodina
- (China) Wang Xinyu / (China) Zhu Lin

=== Withdrawals ===
- (Czech Republic) Marie Bouzková / (Germany) Laura Siegemund → replaced by (China) Han Xinyun / Evgeniya Rodina
- (Czech Republic) Lucie Hradecká / (India) Sania Mirza → replaced by (Czech Republic) Lucie Hradecká / (Czech Republic) Linda Nosková
- (Ukraine) Anhelina Kalinina / (Kazakhstan) Elena Rybakina → replaced by (United States) Catherine Harrison / (United States) Ingrid Neel
- (Estonia) Anett Kontaveit / (United States) Shelby Rogers → replaced by (United Kingdom) Alicia Barnett / (United Kingdom) Olivia Nicholls
- (Italy) Jasmine Paolini / (Italy) Martina Trevisan → replaced by (China) Wang Xinyu / (China) Zhu Lin

== See also ==
- 2022 US Open – Day-by-day summaries
