= 2022 Monterrey Open – Doubles =

Doubles
- 2022 Monterrey Open

Final
- Champions: (United States) Catherine Harrison (United States) Sabrina Santamaria
- Runners-up: (China) Han Xinyun; Yana Sizikova
- Score: 1–6, 7–5, [10–6]

Details
- Draw: 16
- Seeds: 4

Events
Singles	Doubles
← 2021 ·	Monterrey Open	· 2023 →

Catherine Harrison and Sabrina Santamaria defeated Han Xinyun and Yana Sizikova in the final, 1–6, 7–5, [10–6] to win the doubles tennis title at the 2022 Monterrey Open.

Caroline Dolehide and Asia Muhammad were the reigning champions, but they did not participate this year.

== Seeds ==
1. (France) Elixane Lechemia / (United States) Ingrid Neel (quarterfinals)
2. Anastasia Potapova / Kamilla Rakhimova (first round)
3. (Japan) Nao Hibino / (Japan) Miyu Kato (first round)
4. (United States) Kaitlyn Christian / Lidziya Marozava (first round)

== Draw ==
=== Key ===
- Q = Qualifier
- WC = Wild card
- LL = Lucky loser
- Alt = Alternate
- SE = Special exempt
- PR = Protected ranking
- ITF = ITF entry
- JE = Junior exempt
- w/o = Walkover
- r = Retired
- d = Defaulted
- SR = Special ranking

=== Draw ===
First round
1	(France) E Lechemia (United States) I Neel	6	6
WC	(Canada) B Fernandez (Canada) L Fernandez	3	4
PR	(China) X Han; Y Sizikova	6	3	[11]
(Thailand) P Plipuech (Indonesia) A Sutjiadi	3	6	[9]
3	(Japan) N Hibino (Japan) M Kato	4	4
(Ukraine) K Bondarenko (Poland) K Piter	6	6
WC	(Mexico) F Contreras (Mexico) M Zacarías	6	4	[7]
(Hungary) D Gálfi (Spain) N Párrizas Díaz	1	6	[10]
(Italy) S Errani (Spain) S Sorribes Tormo	6	6
(Colombia) C Osorio (Hungary) P Udvardy	1	1
(Japan) M Doi (China) Xin Wang	6	6
4	(United States) K Christian; L Marozava	4	4
(United States) C Harrison (United States) S Santamaria	6	6
(Poland) P Kania-Choduń (Mexico) R Zarazúa	3	4
(Egypt) M Sherif (United Kingdom) H Watson	7^{7}	1	[10]
2	A Potapova; K Rakhimova	6^{4}	6	[6]

Quarterfinals
1	(France) E Lechemia (United States) I Neel	2	5
PR	(China) X Han; Y Sizikova	6	7
(Ukraine) K Bondarenko (Poland) K Piter	6	6
(Hungary) D Gálfi (Spain) N Párrizas Díaz	1	2
(Italy) S Errani (Spain) S Sorribes Tormo	2	6^{2}
(Japan) M Doi (China) Xin Wang	6	7^{7}
(United States) C Harrison (United States) S Santamaria	4	6	[10]
(Egypt) M Sherif (United Kingdom) H Watson	6	2	[6]

Semifinals
PR	(China) X Han; Y Sizikova	6	6
(Ukraine) K Bondarenko (Poland) K Piter	3	3
(Japan) M Doi (China) Xin Wang
(United States) C Harrison (United States) S Santamaria	w/o

Final
PR	(China) X Han; Y Sizikova	6	5	[6]
(United States) C Harrison (United States) S Santamaria	1	7	[10]
