= 2022 US Open – Women's singles =

Tennis championship

Women's singles
- 2022 US Open

Final
- Champion: (Poland) Iga Świątek
- Runner-up: (Tunisia) Ons Jabeur
- Score: 6–2, 7–6^{(7–5)}

Details
- Draw: 128 (16Q / 8WC)
- Seeds: 32

Events
Singles	men	women		boys	girls
Doubles	men	women	mixed	boys	girls
WC Singles	men	women	quad
WC Doubles	men	women	quad
Legends	men	women	mixed
- US Open

Iga Świątek defeated Ons Jabeur in the final, 6–2, 7–6^{(7–5)} to win the women's singles tennis title at the 2022 US Open. It was her first US Open title and third major title overall. Świątek was the first player since Angelique Kerber in 2016 to win multiple majors in a season, having also won the French Open. She became the first Polish woman in the Open Era to reach the US Open quarterfinals and beyond. (Note: Jadwiga Jędrzejowska reached the final in 1937, before the Open Era.) Świątek was the youngest woman to win three majors since Maria Sharapova in 2008.

As of 2026, this was the last hard-court major tournament whose final did not feature future world No. 1 Aryna Sabalenka.

Emma Raducanu was the defending champion, but lost in the first round to Alizé Cornet. It was the third time the defending US Open champion lost in the first round, after Svetlana Kuznetsova in 2005 and Kerber in 2017. This marked the second consecutive major where Cornet defeated a reigning major champion (following her victory over Świątek at Wimbledon). Cornet made her 63rd consecutive major appearance, surpassing Ai Sugiyama's all-time record.

At the time, this tournament marked the final professional appearance of 23-time singles major champion, Olympic singles gold medalist, and former world No. 1 Serena Williams; she lost to Ajla Tomljanović in the third round. It was the longest match at a major in Williams' career, lasting three hours and five minutes. With her victory over second-ranked Anett Kontaveit in the second round, Williams, at 40 years old, became the oldest player to defeat a top three opponent on the WTA Tour. Williams would later return at the 2026 Wimbledon Championships.

This tournament was also the final major appearance of two-time major champion and former world No. 1 Simona Halep; she lost to Daria Snigur in the first round. Following the tournament, Halep served a provisional suspension for violations of anti-doping rules, which ended in March 2024. She announced her retirement from professional tennis in 2025.

This tournament marked the first time in the Open Era that four Chinese women reached the third round of a major. Elise Mertens had her streak of 18 consecutive major third round appearances broken after losing in the first round to Irina-Camelia Begu.

This was the first edition of the US Open to feature a 10-point tiebreak, when the score reached six games all in the deciding set. Karolína Plíšková defeated Magda Linette in the first round in the first women's singles main draw 10-point tiebreak at the US Open.

== Seeds ==
1. (Poland) Iga Świątek (champion)
2. (Estonia) Anett Kontaveit (second round)
3. (Greece) Maria Sakkari (second round)
4. (Spain) Paula Badosa (second round)
5. (Tunisia) Ons Jabeur (final)
6. Aryna Sabalenka (semifinals)
7. (Romania) Simona Halep (first round)
8. (United States) Jessica Pegula (quarterfinals)
9. (Spain) Garbiñe Muguruza (third round)
10. Daria Kasatkina (first round)
11. (United Kingdom) Emma Raducanu (first round)
12. (United States) Coco Gauff (quarterfinals)
13. (Switzerland) Belinda Bencic (third round)
14. (Canada) Leylah Fernandez (second round)
15. (Brazil) Beatriz Haddad Maia (second round)
16. (Latvia) Jeļena Ostapenko (first round)
17. (France) Caroline Garcia (semifinals)
18. Veronika Kudermetova (fourth round)
19. (United States) Danielle Collins (fourth round)
20. (United States) Madison Keys (third round)
21. (Czech Republic) Petra Kvitová (fourth round)
22. (Czech Republic) Karolína Plíšková (quarterfinals)
23. (Czech Republic) Barbora Krejčíková (second round)
24. (United States) Amanda Anisimova (first round)
25. (Kazakhstan) Elena Rybakina (first round)
26. Victoria Azarenka (fourth round)
27. (Italy) Martina Trevisan (first round)
28. Ekaterina Alexandrova (second round)
29. (United States) Alison Riske-Amritraj (fourth round)
30. (Switzerland) Jil Teichmann (first round)
31. (United States) Shelby Rogers (third round)
32. (Belgium) Elise Mertens (first round)

Click on the seed number of a player to go to their draw section.

== Draw ==
Key

- Q = Qualifier
- WC = Wild card
- LL = Lucky loser
- Alt = Alternate
- ITF = ITF entry
- PR = Protected ranking
- SR = Special ranking
- SE = Special exempt
- JE = Junior exempt
- JR = Junior Accelerator Programme entrant
- CO = College Accelerator Programme entrant
- NG = Next Gen Accelerator Program entrant
- w/o = Walkover
- r = Retired
- d = Defaulted

=== Finals ===
Quarterfinals
1	(Poland) Iga Świątek	6	7^{7}
8	(United States) Jessica Pegula	3	6^{4}
22	(Czech Republic) Karolína Plíšková	1	6^{4}
6	Aryna Sabalenka	6	7^{7}
12	(United States) Coco Gauff	3	4
17	(France) Caroline Garcia	6	6
5	(Tunisia) Ons Jabeur	6	7^{7}
(Australia) Ajla Tomljanović	4	6^{4}

Semifinals
1	(Poland) Iga Świątek	3	6	6
6	Aryna Sabalenka	6	1	4
17	(France) Caroline Garcia	1	3
5	(Tunisia) Ons Jabeur	6	6

Final
1	(Poland) Iga Świątek	6	7^{7}
5	(Tunisia) Ons Jabeur	2	6^{5}

=== Top half ===
==== Section 1 ====
First round
1	(Poland) I Świątek	6	6
(Italy) J Paolini	3	0
(Belgium) G Minnen	6	3	3
(United States) S Stephens	1	6	6
(United States) L Davis	4	7^{7}	5
(Italy) L Bronzetti	6	6^{3}	4^{r}
WC	(United States) P Stearns	4	6	5
28	E Alexandrova	6	4	7
24	(United States) A Anisimova	3	3
(Kazakhstan) Y Putintseva	6	6
WC	(United States) S Kenin	6^{3}	4
(Germany) J Niemeier	7^{7}	6
(United States) C Liu	1	4
A Potapova	6	6
(China) Q Zheng	6	3	6
16	(Latvia) J Ostapenko	3	6	4

Second round
1	(Poland) I Świątek	6	6
(United States) S Stephens	3	2
(United States) L Davis	0	6	7^{10}
28	E Alexandrova	6	4	6^{5}
(Kazakhstan) Y Putintseva	4	3
(Germany) J Niemeier	6	6
A Potapova	6^{4}	6^{3}
(China) Q Zheng	7^{7}	7^{7}

Third round
1	(Poland) I Świątek	6	6
(United States) L Davis	3	4
(Germany) J Niemeier	6	7^{7}
(China) Q Zheng	4	6^{5}

Fourth round
1	(Poland) I Świątek	2	6	6
(Germany) J Niemeier	6	4	0

==== Section 2 ====
First round
9	(Spain) G Muguruza	6	7^{7}
(Denmark) C Tauson	3	6^{5}
Q	(Czech Republic) L Fruhvirtová	6	6
(China) Xin Wang	3	4
(United States) B Pera	4	4
(Ukraine) A Kalinina	6	6
Q	E Andreeva	6^{3}	0
21	(Czech Republic) P Kvitová	7^{7}	6
32	(Belgium) E Mertens	6	2	3
(Romania) I-C Begu	3	6	6
Q	(China) Y Yuan	6	6
WC	(Australia) J Fourlis	3	2
Q	(Italy) E Cocciaretto	2	4
A Sasnovich	6	6
Q	(Switzerland) V Golubic	2	2
8	(United States) J Pegula	6	6

Second round
9	(Spain) G Muguruza	6	6
Q	(Czech Republic) L Fruhvirtová	0	4
(Ukraine) A Kalinina
21	(Czech Republic) P Kvitová	w/o
(Romania) I-C Begu	3	6^{6}
Q	(China) Y Yuan	6	7^{8}
A Sasnovich	4	4
8	(United States) J Pegula	6	6

Third round
9	(Spain) G Muguruza	7	3	6^{10}
21	(Czech Republic) P Kvitová	5	6	7^{12}
Q	(China) Y Yuan	2	7^{8}	0
8	(United States) J Pegula	6	6^{6}	6

Fourth round
21	(Czech Republic) P Kvitová	3	2
8	(United States) J Pegula	6	6

==== Section 3 ====
First round
4	(Spain) P Badosa	3	7^{7}	6
(Ukraine) L Tsurenko	6	6^{4}	3
V Gracheva	4	6^{3}
(Croatia) P Martić	6	7^{7}
(Egypt) M Sherif	6^{2}	4
(Ukraine) M Kostyuk	7^{7}	6
Q	(United States) A Krueger	1	6	2
26	V Azarenka	6	4	6
22	(Czech Republic) Ka Plíšková	6	4	7^{10}
(Poland) M Linette	2	6	6^{8}
(Czech Republic) M Bouzková	6	6^{3}	6
Q	(Czech Republic) L Nosková	2	7^{7}	2
PR	(Germany) L Siegemund	4	4
(Romania) S Cîrstea	6	6
(Germany) A Petkovic	2	6	4
13	(Switzerland) B Bencic	6	4	6

Second round
4	(Spain) P Badosa	7^{7}	1	2
(Croatia) P Martić	6^{5}	6	6
(Ukraine) M Kostyuk	2	3
26	V Azarenka	6	6
22	(Czech Republic) Ka Plíšková	6	6
(Czech Republic) M Bouzková	3	2
(Romania) S Cîrstea	6	5	2
13	(Switzerland) B Bencic	3	7	6

Third round
(Croatia) P Martić	3	0
26	V Azarenka	6	6
22	(Czech Republic) Ka Plíšková	5	6	6
13	(Switzerland) B Bencic	7	4	3

Fourth round
26	V Azarenka	5	7^{7}	2
22	(Czech Republic) Ka Plíšková	7	6^{5}	6

==== Section 4 ====
First round
11	(United Kingdom) E Raducanu	3	3
(France) A Cornet	6	6
PR	(United States) T Townsend	4	6	2
(Czech Republic) K Siniaková	6	4	6
(Slovenia) K Juvan	4	4
Q	(Spain) C Bucșa	6	6
(Japan) N Osaka	6^{5}	3
19	(United States) D Collins	7^{7}	6
25	(Kazakhstan) E Rybakina	4	4
Q	(France) C Burel	6	6
(Belgium) A Van Uytvanck	6	7^{7}
WC	(United States) V Williams	1	6^{5}
(Estonia) K Kanepi	7^{7}	6
(Czech Republic) T Martincová	6^{4}	3
Q	(United States) C Harrison	1	3
6	A Sabalenka	6	6

Second round
(France) A Cornet	6	1	6
(Czech Republic) K Siniaková	1	6	3
Q	(Spain) C Bucșa	2	5
19	(United States) D Collins	6	7
Q	(France) C Burel	6	4	6
(Belgium) A Van Uytvanck	4	6	4
(Estonia) K Kanepi	6	6^{8}	4
6	A Sabalenka	2	7^{10}	6

Third round
(France) A Cornet	4	6^{9}
19	(United States) D Collins	6	7^{11}
Q	(France) C Burel	0	2
6	A Sabalenka	6	6

Fourth round
19	(United States) D Collins	6	3	2
6	A Sabalenka	3	6	6

=== Bottom half ===
==== Section 5 ====
First round
7	(Romania) S Halep	2	6	4
Q	(Ukraine) D Snigur	6	0	6
(Poland) M Fręch	2	3
(Canada) R Marino	6	6
PR	(Argentina) N Podoroska	3	2
(Slovakia) AK Schmiedlová	6	6
(China) S Zhang	6	6
30	(Switzerland) J Teichmann	4	2
20	(United States) M Keys	7^{7}	6
(Ukraine) D Yastremska	6^{3}	3
(Italy) C Giorgi	4	6	6
(Hungary) A Bondár	6	3	1
(Romania) E-G Ruse	3	6	6
(Australia) D Saville	6	2	4
Q	(France) L Jeanjean	2	3
12	(United States) C Gauff	6	6

Second round
Q	(Ukraine) D Snigur	3	6^{5}
(Canada) R Marino	6	7^{7}
(Slovakia) AK Schmiedlová	5	1
(China) S Zhang	7	6
20	(United States) M Keys	6	5	7^{10}
(Italy) C Giorgi	4	7	6^{6}
(Romania) E-G Ruse	2	6^{4}
12	(United States) C Gauff	6	7^{7}

Third round
(Canada) R Marino	2	4
(China) S Zhang	6	6
20	(United States) M Keys	2	3
12	(United States) C Gauff	6	6

Fourth round
(China) S Zhang	5	5
12	(United States) C Gauff	7	7

==== Section 6 ====
First round
15	(Brazil) B Haddad Maia	6	6
(Croatia) A Konjuh	0	0
WC	(France) H Tan	0	6	1
(Canada) B Andreescu	6	3	6
(Sweden) R Peterson	4	3
A Kalinskaya	6	6
LL	K Rakhimova	2	4
17	(France) C Garcia	6	6
29	(United States) A Riske-Amritraj	6	6
WC	(United States) E Yu	2	4
(United States) A Li	6	3	1
(Colombia) C Osorio	1	6	6
(France) D Parry	7	3	3
(China) Xiy Wang	5	6	6
(Germany) T Maria	4	6	0
3	(Greece) M Sakkari	6	3	6

Second round
15	(Brazil) B Haddad Maia	2	4
(Canada) B Andreescu	6	6
A Kalinskaya	3	1
17	(France) C Garcia	6	6
29	(United States) A Riske-Amritraj	6	6^{5}	7^{10}
(Colombia) C Osorio	4	7^{7}	6^{5}
(China) Xiy Wang	3	7	7
3	(Greece) M Sakkari	6	5	5

Third round
(Canada) B Andreescu	3	2
17	(France) C Garcia	6	6
29	(United States) A Riske-Amritraj	6	3	6
(China) Xiy Wang	4	6	4

Fourth round
17	(France) C Garcia	6	6
29	(United States) A Riske-Amritraj	4	1

==== Section 7 ====
First round
5	(Tunisia) O Jabeur	7	6
(United States) M Brengle	5	2
WC	(United States) E Mandlik	5	7^{7}	6
(Slovenia) T Zidanšek	7	6^{3}	4
Q	(Slovakia) V Kužmová	6	6
(Spain) S Sorribes Tormo	3	4
(Netherlands) A Rus	6	3	4
31	(United States) S Rogers	3	6	6
18	V Kudermetova	7	6
(Croatia) D Vekić	5	3
WC	(United States) C Vandeweghe	1	5
(Belgium) M Zanevska	6	7
(Spain) N Párrizas Díaz	4	3
(Hungary) D Gálfi	6	6
(United Kingdom) H Dart	7^{10}	1	6
10	D Kasatkina	6^{8}	6	3

Second round
5	(Tunisia) O Jabeur	7	6
WC	(United States) E Mandlik	5	2
Q	(Slovakia) V Kužmová	5	1
31	(United States) S Rogers	7	6
18	V Kudermetova	6	6
(Belgium) M Zanevska	2	3
(Hungary) D Gálfi	6	6
(United Kingdom) H Dart	4	0

Third round
5	(Tunisia) O Jabeur	4	6	6
31	(United States) S Rogers	6	4	3
18	V Kudermetova	6	6
(Hungary) D Gálfi	2	0

Fourth round
5	(Tunisia) O Jabeur	7^{7}	6
18	V Kudermetova	6^{1}	4

==== Section 8 ====
First round
14	(Canada) L Fernandez	6	6
(France) O Dodin	3	4
Q	(Czech Republic) S Bejlek	3	1
L Samsonova	6	6
Q	E Avanesyan	4	4
(Serbia) A Krunić	6	6
Q	(Mexico) F Contreras Gómez	0	4
23	(Czech Republic) B Krejčíková	6	6
27	(Italy) M Trevisan	5	1
PR	E Rodina	7	6
PR	(Czech Republic) K Muchová	3	6^{5}
(Australia) A Tomljanović	6	7^{7}
(Montenegro) D Kovinić	3	3
PR	(United States) S Williams	6	6
(Romania) J Cristian	3	0
2	(Estonia) A Kontaveit	6	6

Second round
14	(Canada) L Fernandez	3	6^{3}
L Samsonova	6	7^{7}
(Serbia) A Krunić	2	6	6
23	(Czech Republic) B Krejčíková	6	4	2
PR	E Rodina	6	2	5
(Australia) A Tomljanović	1	6	7
PR	(United States) S Williams	7^{7}	2	6
2	(Estonia) A Kontaveit	6^{4}	6	2

Third round
L Samsonova	6	6
(Serbia) A Krunić	3	3
(Australia) A Tomljanović	7	6^{4}	6
PR	(United States) S Williams	5	7^{7}	1

Fourth round
L Samsonova	6^{8}	1
(Australia) A Tomljanović	7^{10}	6

== Championship match statistics ==
Category	(Poland) Świątek	(Tunisia) Jabeur
1st serve %	57/72 (79%)	47/75 (63%)
1st serve points won	33 of 57 = 58%	25 of 47 = 53%
2nd serve points won	7 of 15 = 47%	9 of 28 = 32%
Total service points won	40 of 72 = 55.56%	34 of 75 = 45.33%
Aces	1	0
Double faults	2	4
Winners	19	14
Unforced errors	30	33
Net points won	11 of 16 = 69%	7 of 15 = 47%
Break points converted	5 of 12 = 42%	3 of 9 = 33%
Return points won	41 of 75 = 55%	32 of 72 = 44%
Total points won	81	66

== Seeded players ==
The following are the seeded players. Seedings are based on WTA rankings as of August 22, 2022. Rankings and points are as before August 29, 2022.

Seed	Rank	Player	Points before	Points defending	Points won	Points after	Status
1	1	(Poland) Iga Świątek	8,605	240	2,000	10,365	Champion, defeated (Tunisia) Ons Jabeur [5]
2	2	(Estonia) Anett Kontaveit	4,360	130	70	4,300	Second round lost to (United States) Serena Williams (PR)
3	3	(Greece) Maria Sakkari	4,190	780	70	3,480	Second round lost to (China) Wang Xiyu
4	4	(Spain) Paula Badosa	3,980	70	70	3,980	Second round lost to (Croatia) Petra Martić
5	5	(Tunisia) Ons Jabeur	3,920	130	1,300	5,090	Runner-up, lost to (Poland) Iga Świątek [1]
6	6	Aryna Sabalenka	3,470	780	780	3,470	Semifinals lost to (Poland) Iga Świątek [1]
7	7	(Romania) Simona Halep	3,255	240	10	3,025	First round lost to (Ukraine) Daria Snigur (Q)
8	8	(United States) Jessica Pegula	3,201	130	430	3,501	Quarterfinals lost to (Poland) Iga Świątek [1]
9	10	(Spain) Garbiñe Muguruza	2,886	240	130	2,776	Third round lost to (Czech Republic) Petra Kvitová [21]
10	9	Daria Kasatkina	3,015	130	10	2,895	First round lost to (United Kingdom) Harriet Dart
11	11	(United Kingdom) Emma Raducanu	2,756	2,040	10	726	First round lost to (France) Alizé Cornet
12	12	(United States) Coco Gauff	2,687	70	430	3,047	Quarterfinals lost to (France) Caroline Garcia [17]
13	13	(Switzerland) Belinda Bencic	2,635	430	130	2,335	Third round lost to (Czech Republic) Karolína Plíšková [22]
14	14	(Canada) Leylah Fernandez	2,540	1,300	70	1,310	Second round lost to Liudmila Samsonova
15	15	(Brazil) Beatriz Haddad Maia	2,317	(96+96)^{†}	70+43	2,238	Second round lost to (Canada) Bianca Andreescu
16	16	(Latvia) Jeļena Ostapenko	2,316	(1)^{‡}	10	2,325	First round lost to (China) Zheng Qinwen
17	17	(France) Caroline Garcia	2,220	70	780	2,930	Semifinals lost to (Tunisia) Ons Jabeur [5]
18	18	Veronika Kudermetova	2,206	10	240	2,436	Fourth round lost to (Tunisia) Ons Jabeur [5]
19	19	(United States) Danielle Collins	2,167	130	240	2,277	Fourth round lost to Aryna Sabalenka [6]
20	20	(United States) Madison Keys	2,128	10	130	2,248	Third round lost to (United States) Coco Gauff [12]
21	21	(Czech Republic) Petra Kvitová	2,077	130	240	2,187	Fourth round lost to (United States) Jessica Pegula [8]
22	22	(Czech Republic) Karolína Plíšková	2,007	430	430	2,007	Quarterfinals lost to Aryna Sabalenka [6]
23	23	(Czech Republic) Barbora Krejčíková	2,003	430	70	1,643	Second round lost to (Serbia) Aleksandra Krunić
24	24	(United States) Amanda Anisimova	1,900	70	10	1,840	First round lost to (Kazakhstan) Yulia Putintseva
25	25	(Kazakhstan) Elena Rybakina	1,850	130	10	1,730	First round lost to (France) Clara Burel (Q)
26	26	Victoria Azarenka	1,841	130	240	1,951	Fourth round lost to (Czech Republic) Karolína Plíšková [22]
27	27	(Italy) Martina Trevisan	1,771	70+95	10+20	1,636	First round lost to Evgeniya Rodina (PR)
28	28	Ekaterina Alexandrova	1,750	70	70	1,750	Second round lost to (United States) Lauren Davis
29	29	(United States) Alison Riske-Amritraj	1,525	10	240	1,755	Fourth round lost to (France) Caroline Garcia [17]
30	30	(Switzerland) Jil Teichmann	1,517	70	10	1,457	First round lost to (China) Zhang Shuai
31	31	(United States) Shelby Rogers	1,516	240	130	1,406	Third round lost to (Tunisia) Ons Jabeur [5]
32	33	(Belgium) Elise Mertens	1,435	240	10	1,205	First round lost to (Romania) Irina-Camelia Begu

† The player did not qualify for the tournament in 2021 and is defending points from two ITF tournaments (Collonge-Bellerive and Montreux) instead.
‡ The player was not required to include zero points for the 2021 tournament in her ranking due to the WTA's COVID-19 rules. Accordingly, points for her 16th best result will be deducted instead.

== Other entry information ==
=== Wild cards ===
- (Australia) Jaimee Fourlis
- (United States) Sofia Kenin
- (United States) Elizabeth Mandlik
- (United States) Peyton Stearns
- (France) Harmony Tan
- (United States) CoCo Vandeweghe
- (United States) Venus Williams
- (United States) Eleana Yu

=== Protected ranking ===
- (United States) Serena Williams (16)
- (Czech Republic) Karolína Muchová (22)
- (Argentina) Nadia Podoroska (39)
- (Germany) Laura Siegemund (57)
- Evgeniya Rodina (73)
- (United States) Taylor Townsend (84)

=== Qualifiers ===
- Erika Andreeva
- Elina Avanesyan
- (Czech Republic) Sára Bejlek
- (Spain) Cristina Bucșa
- (France) Clara Burel
- (Italy) Elisabetta Cocciaretto
- (Mexico) Fernanda Contreras Gómez
- (Czech Republic) Linda Fruhvirtová
- (Switzerland) Viktorija Golubic
- (United States) Catherine Harrison
- (France) Léolia Jeanjean
- (United States) Ashlyn Krueger
- (Slovakia) Viktória Kužmová
- (Czech Republic) Linda Nosková
- (Ukraine) Daria Snigur
- (China) Yuan Yue

=== Lucky losers ===
- Kamilla Rakhimova

=== Withdrawals ===
The entry list was released by the United States Tennis Association based on the WTA rankings for the week of July 18.

- † (Ukraine) Elina Svitolina (42) → replaced by (Belgium) Greet Minnen (99)
- ‡ Anastasia Pavlyuchenkova (97) → replaced by (Germany) Tatjana Maria (100)
- ‡ (Czech Republic) Markéta Vondroušová (49) → replaced by (Canada) Rebecca Marino (101)
- ‡ (Slovakia) Kristína Kučová (90) → replaced by (Germany) Jule Niemeier (102) (Note: Last direct acceptance)
- @ (Germany) Angelique Kerber (31) → replaced by Kamilla Rakhimova (LL)

† – not included on entry list
‡ – withdrew from entry list before qualifying draw
@ – withdrew from entry list after qualifying draw

== Explanatory notes ==
Preceded by 2022 Wimbledon Championships – Women's singles	Grand Slam women's singles	Succeeded by 2023 Australian Open – Women's singles
