= Leylah Fernandez =

Canadian tennis player (born 2002)

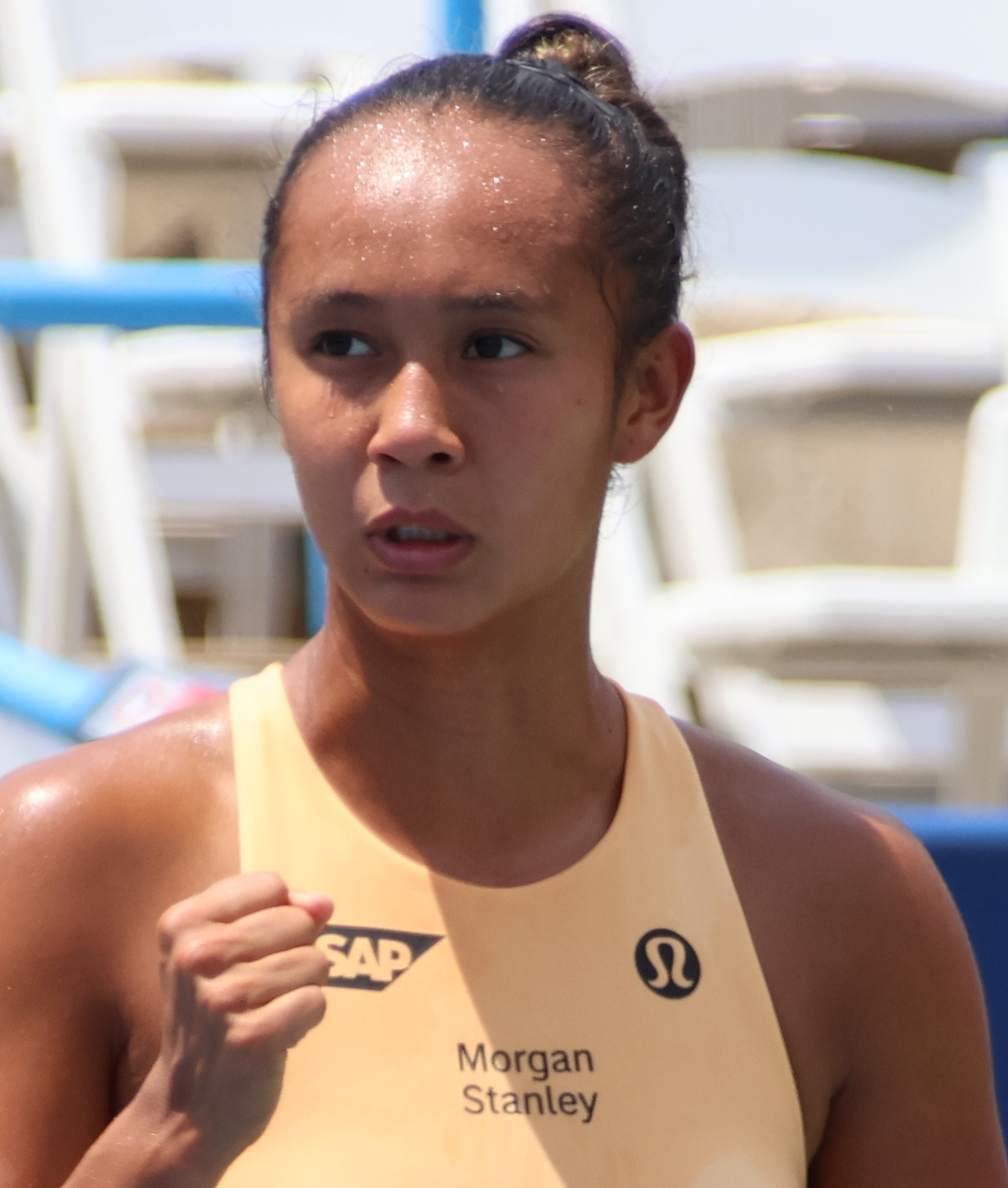
- Fernandez at the 2025 Washington Open
- Full name: Leylah Annie Fernandez
- Country (sports): Canada
- Residence: Boynton Beach, Florida, U.S.
- Born: 6 September 2002 (age 24) Montreal, Quebec, Canada
- Height: 1.68 m (5 ft 6 in)
- Turned pro: 2019
- Plays: Left-handed (two-handed backhand)
- Coach: Jorge Fernandez
- Prize money: $9,277,055

Singles
- Career record: 262–180
- Career titles: 6
- Highest ranking: No. 13 (8 August 2022)
- Current ranking: No. 18 (2 November 2026)

Grand Slam singles results
- Australian Open: 3R (2025)
- French Open: QF (2022)
- Wimbledon: 2R (2023, 2024, 2025)
- US Open: F (2021)

Other tournaments
- Olympic Games: 3R (2024)

Doubles
- Career record: 102–90
- Career titles: 0
- Highest ranking: No. 17 (23 October 2023)
- Current ranking: No. 74 (2 November 2026)

Grand Slam doubles results
- Australian Open: 3R (2021, 2025)
- French Open: F (2023)
- Wimbledon: 3R (2024)
- US Open: QF (2023, 2025)

Other doubles tournaments
- Olympic Games: 2R (2024)

Grand Slam mixed doubles results
- Australian Open: 2R (2026)
- Wimbledon: QF (2026)
- US Open: QF (2022)

Team competitions
- BJK Cup: W (2023), record 16–4
- Last updated on: 2 November 2026.

Leylah Annie Fernandez (born 6 September 2002) is a Canadian professional tennis player. She has been ranked as high as No. 13 in women's singles by the WTA, achieved in August 2022, and No. 17 in doubles, achieved in October 2023. Fernandez has won six WTA Tour singles titles, and as a teenager, she finished runner-up at the 2021 US Open, defeating three top-5 players en route (including defending champion Naomi Osaka).

Fernandez represents Canada at the Billie Jean King Cup, and led it to its first championship in 2023, winning the decisive rubber in the final and being awarded the Heart Award.

== Early life ==
Fernandez (Spanish: Fernández) was born in Montreal, Quebec. She attended École secondaire Antoine-de-Saint-Exupéry. Her father Jorge is from Ecuador. Her mother Irene (née Exevea) is a Filipino Canadian. Her younger sister Bianca Jolie is also a tennis player and her older sister Jodeci Malixi is a dentist.

== Career ==
=== Juniors ===
On 25 January 2019, as a 16-year-old, Fernandez reached the Australian Open girls' singles final, where she lost to the top-seeded Clara Tauson. On 8 June 2019, Fernandez defeated Emma Navarro in the French Open final to become the first Canadian female winner of a junior Grand Slam title since Eugenie Bouchard at the 2012 Wimbledon Championships, a victory that earned her the world No. 1 junior ranking.

=== 2019: Professional debut ===
On 21 July 2019, Fernandez won her first professional singles tennis title when she rallied to beat fellow Canadian Carson Branstine in the final of the Gatineau Challenger. Fernandez also won her first professional doubles title on the same date when she teamed with Rebecca Marino of Vancouver. The pair defeated the second-seeded team of Marcela Zacarías of Mexico and Hsu Chieh-yu of Taiwan. The following week, she made her second consecutive ITF final in Granby, losing to Lizette Cabrera of Australia.

=== 2020: Major debut, first WTA Tour final ===
Fernandez made her major debut at the Australian Open. After qualifying, she lost in the first round to Lauren Davis.

She achieved the biggest win of her career the following week in the 2020 Billie Jean King Cup qualifying round against world No. 5, Belinda Bencic.

In late February, at the Mexican Open, she qualified and reached her first WTA Tour final, losing to world No. 69 Heather Watson. A week later, she defeated fifth seed Sloane Stephens to reach the quarterfinals of the Monterrey Open, losing to top seed and eventual champion, Elina Svitolina.

In October at the French Open, Fernandez reached the third round, first by upsetting 31st seed Magda Linette in the opening round, and then defeating Polona Hercog, before losing to seventh seed Petra Kvitová, in straight sets.

=== 2021: Monterrey title, US Open final ===
Fernandez began 2021 without consecutive wins in her first four tournaments. However, in March at the Monterrey Open, she won her first four matches to reach the final, defeating Viktorija Golubic to win the first WTA Tour title of her career. At 18 years old, she was the youngest player in the main draw, and won without dropping a set during the tournament.

At the US Open, Fernandez became a fan favorite due to her success as an underdog. She defeated the third seed and defending champion, Naomi Osaka, in three sets in the third round, former world-number-one and three-time major champion, Angelique Kerber, in the fourth round, in three sets, and fifth seed Elina Svitolina in the quarterfinals, again in three sets, to reach her maiden major semifinal a day after her 19th birthday. She then defeated Aryna Sabalenka, the second seed, to reach her first major final. It was the third time in the Open era that a woman defeated three of the top five seeds at the US Open. In the final, she lost to fellow teenager Emma Raducanu, in straight sets.

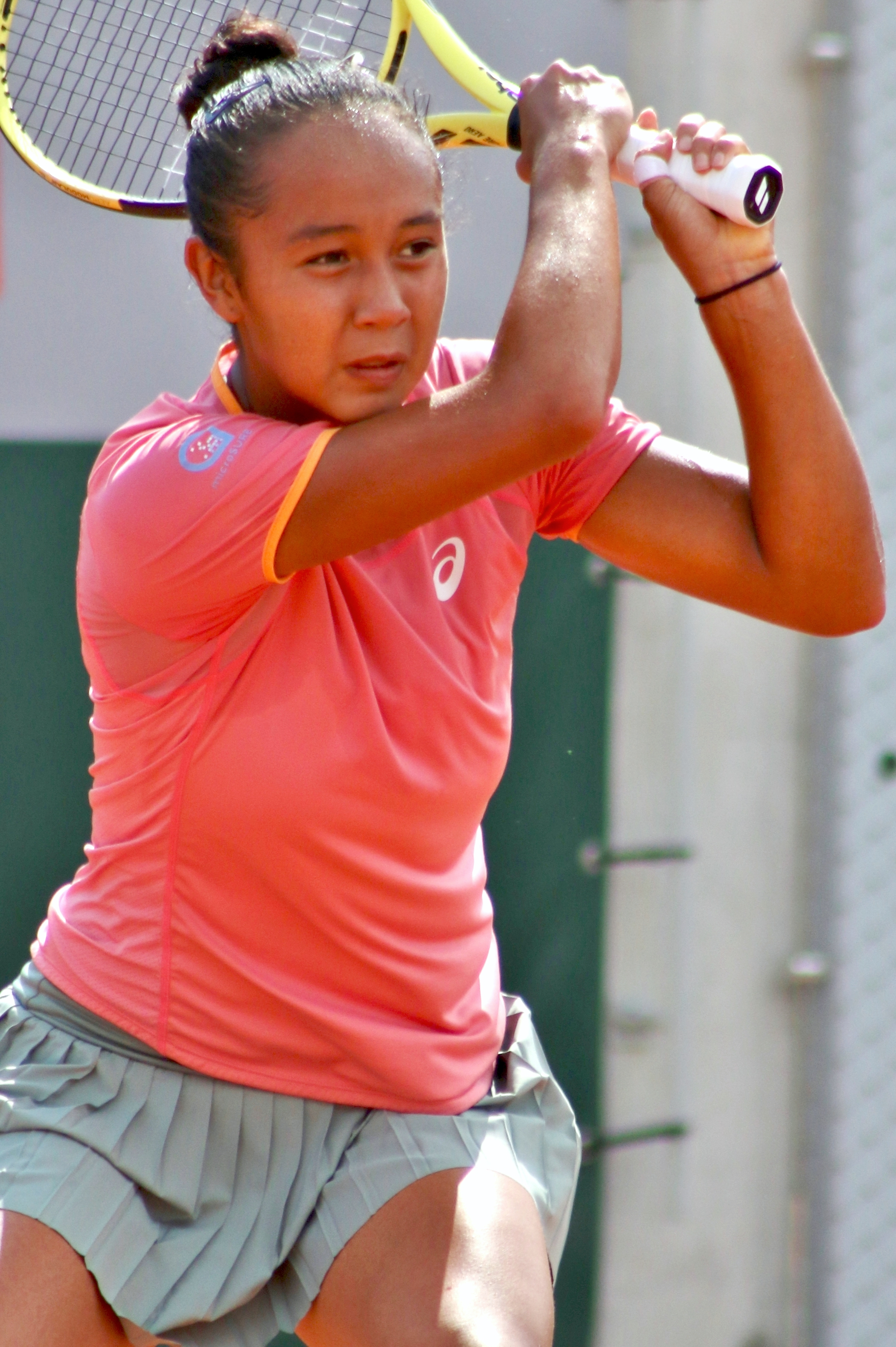
Fernandez at the 2021 French Open

Fernandez then made her Indian Wells Open debut as the 23rd seed. She first beat Alizé Cornet in the second round and French Open finalist Anastasia Pavlyuchenkova in the third, before suffering an upset in round four by Shelby Rogers.

At the end of the year, Fernandez was given the Bobbie Rosenfeld Award by the Canadian Press as its choice for Canadian female athlete of 2021.

=== 2022: Monterrey title ===
Fernandez started the season at the Adelaide International where she advanced to the round of 16, in which she was defeated by Iga Świątek, in straight sets. She lost to Maddison Inglis in the opening round of the Australian Open as the 23rd seed.

In March, Fernandez defended her Monterrey Open title, reaching her fourth final and winning her second career title. Beating Anna Karolína Schmiedlová, Zheng Qinwen, Wang Qiang and Beatriz Haddad Maia to reach the final, Fernandez won against Camila Osorio in three sets, saving five championship points in the final set. She also entered the doubles competition with her sister, Bianca Fernandez. They lost in the first round to Elixane Lechemia and Ingrid Neel.

Fernandez subsequently entered the Indian Wells Open. Receiving a bye in the first round, she advanced to round three after a retirement from Amanda Anisimova. In her third-round match, she won the second-set tiebreak and defeated Shelby Rogers in three sets, before losing to defending champion Paula Badosa in the fourth. In the doubles competition, partnering with Alizé Cornet, the pair reached semifinals losing there to eventual champions Xu Yifan and Yang Zhaoxuan.

In May, at the French Open, Fernandez beat Olympic champion Belinda Bencic and 2019 French Open semifinalist Amanda Anisimova in the third and fourth rounds, respectively, before losing to Martina Trevisan in the quarterfinals.

A Grade-III-fractured foot acquired during her quarterfinal match with Trevisan forced her to miss Wimbledon, after a first-round exit the previous year to Jeļena Ostapenko.

At the Canadian Open, Fernandez lost in the second round to eventual finalist Beatriz Haddad Maia. At the Cincinnati Open, she lost in the first round to Ekaterina Alexandrova.

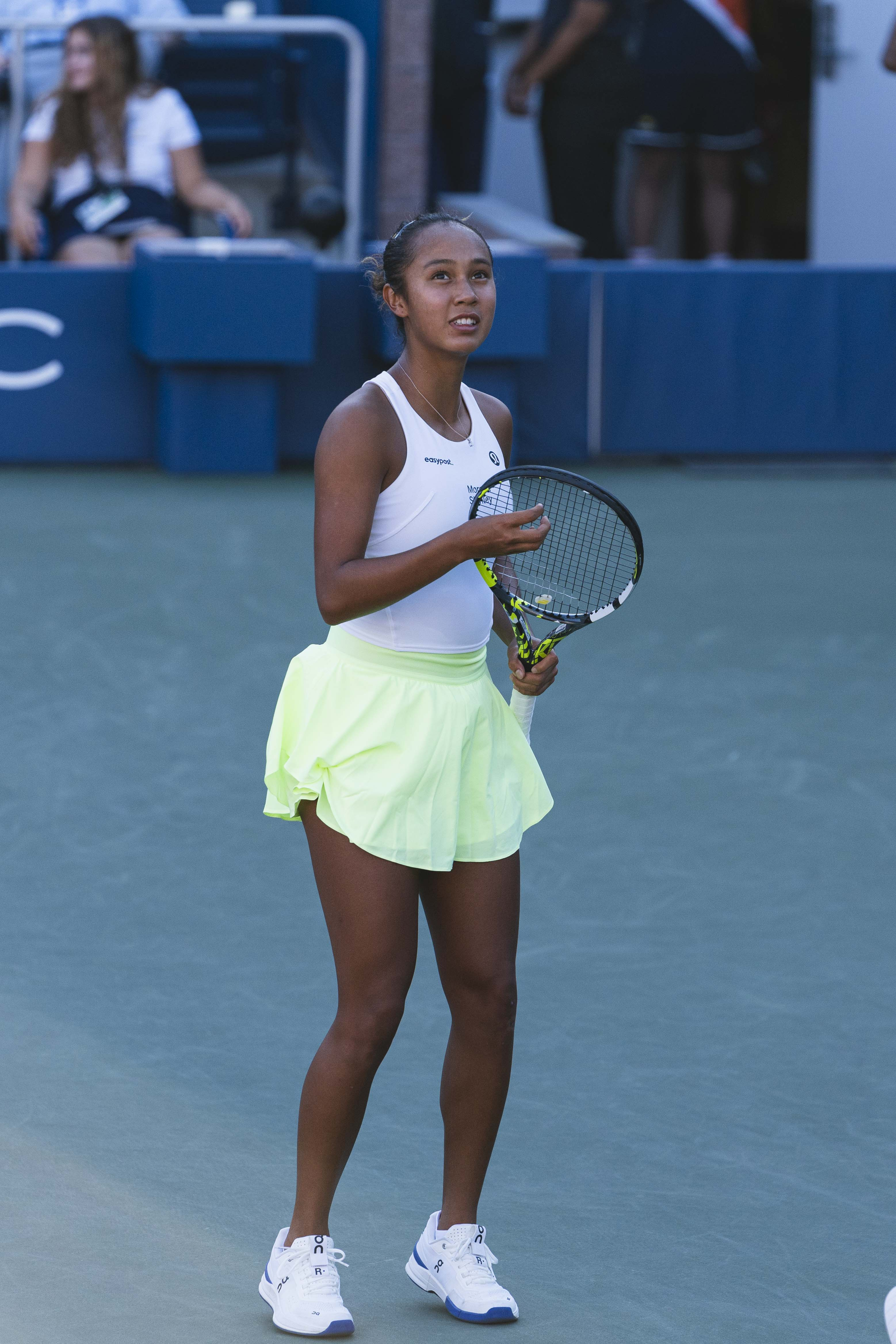
Fernandez at the 2022 US Open

Fernandez entered the US Open seeded 14th and defeated Océane Dodin, before losing to Liudmila Samsonova. With the loss of most of her points from reaching the final last year, Fernandez fell outside of the top 30. In the doubles draw, pairing with Daria Saville, she reached the second round, and with Jack Sock in the mixed doubles the quarterfinals.

=== 2023: French Open final, BJK Cup win ===
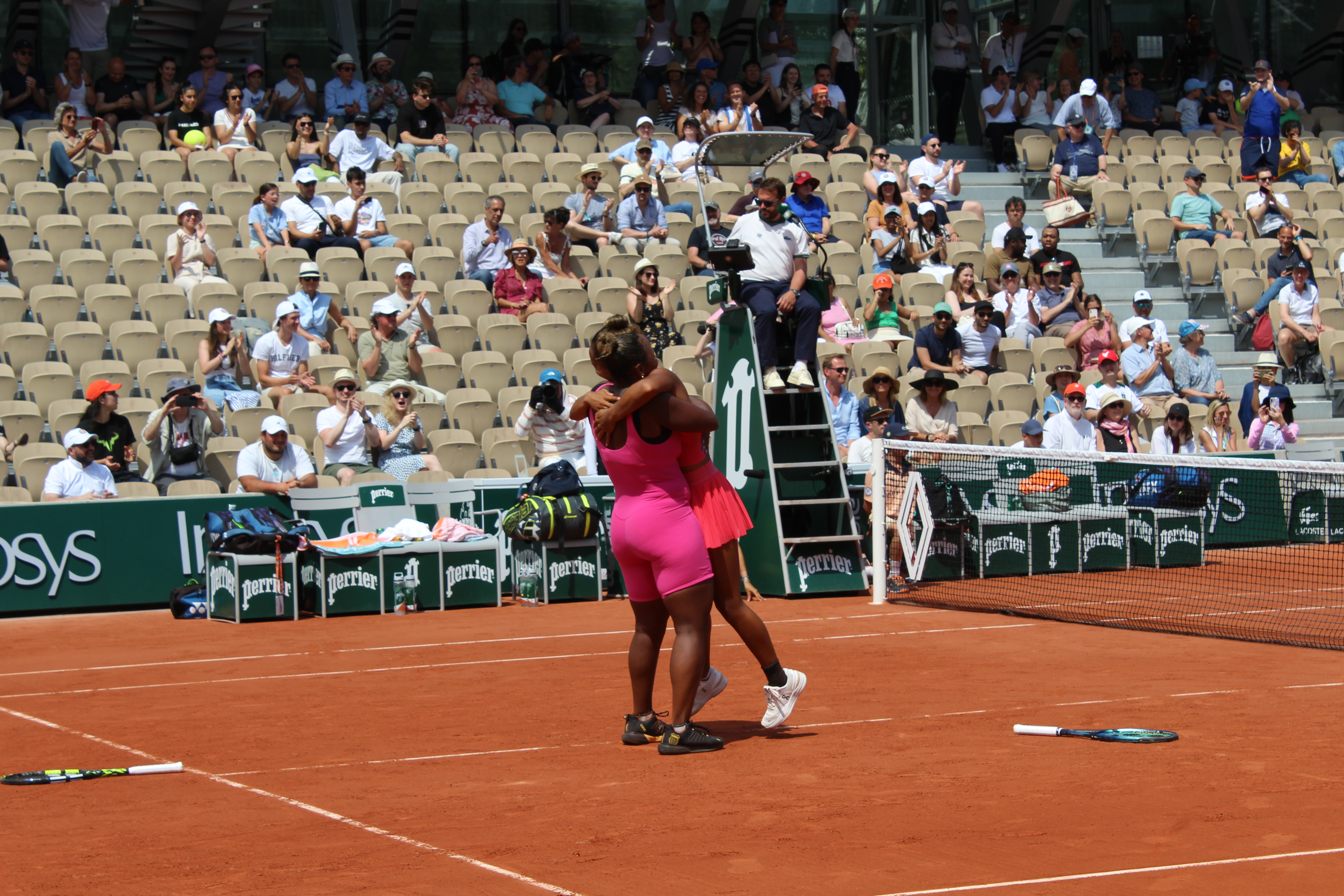
Fernandez embraces doubles partner Taylor Townsend at the 2023 French Open, where they reached their first major doubles final.

Fernandez started the season by reaching the quarterfinals at the Auckland Open. At the Australian Open, she won her first-round match against Alizé Cornet. In the second round, she lost to world No. 4, Caroline Garcia, in a hard-fought match, having set points in both sets.

At the Miami Open in the doubles competition, partnering with Taylor Townsend, they reached the final where they lost to American No. 1 duo Coco Gauff and Jessica Pegula. As a result, she moved up 40 positions to a new career-high of No. 42 in the doubles rankings, and later in beginning of May to No. 36.

At the French Open in singles, she reached the second round but lost to Clara Tauson. At the same tournament, in doubles, she reached her first major doubles final alongside Taylor Townsend. As a result, she moved into the top 20 in the doubles rankings, on 21 August 2023. At Wimbledon, Fernandez lost in the second round to Garcia in a third-set tiebreak. With Townsend, she again lost to Garcia and her partner Luisa Stefani in the second round of the women's doubles, and partnered with Wesley Koolhof in the mixed doubles, losing in the second round.

Fernandez had mixed results during the North American hardcourt swing. She lost to Maria Sakkari in the second round of Washington Open, and scored a win against 11th seed Beatriz Haddad Maia in the second round of the Canadian Open, before losing to Danielle Collins. After failing to qualify for the Cincinnati Open, Fernandez reached the quarterfinals of Tennis in Cleveland. Fernandez was knocked out of the US Open in the first round by Ekaterina Alexandrova, but again with Townsend, reached the quarterfinal of the women's doubles losing to eventual champions, Erin Routliffe and Gabriela Dabrowski.

Fernandez had better results post the US Open. She reached her first WTA 1000 singles quarterfinal at the Guadalajara Open, losing to Sofia Kenin. At the same tournament, she also made the quarterfinals in doubles with Townsend.

At the beginning of the Asian swing, Fernandez failed to qualify for the China Open, but won her first title since February 2022 at the Hong Kong Open, defeating Victoria Azarenka, Mirra Andreeva, Linda Fruhvirtová, Anna Blinkova and Kateřina Siniaková. With her title, she reentered the top 50 at No. 43 for the first time, since she dropped her Roland Garros quarterfinal points in May. At the next Asian tournament, the Jiangxi Open, she lost this time to Siniaková in the semifinals. She climbed back to the top 35 in the singles rankings and set a new career-high in doubles of No. 17, on 23 October 2023.

Fernandez led the Canadian team to victory at the 2023 Billie Jean King Cup, winning her four singles matches and one doubles match, and defeating her first top ten opponent (Markéta Vondroušová) since the 2021 US Open. This was Canada's first-ever Cup win, immediately hailed as a major moment in the history of Canadian tennis, and Fernandez was widely singled out for praise for her contributions. She said that the achievement "means the world to me," adding that it "gives me a lot of confidence, but also the group of girls and Canada a lot of confidence." Fernandez won the Heart Award for both the Qualifiers and the Finals, becoming only the second player in history to win the award twice in one season.

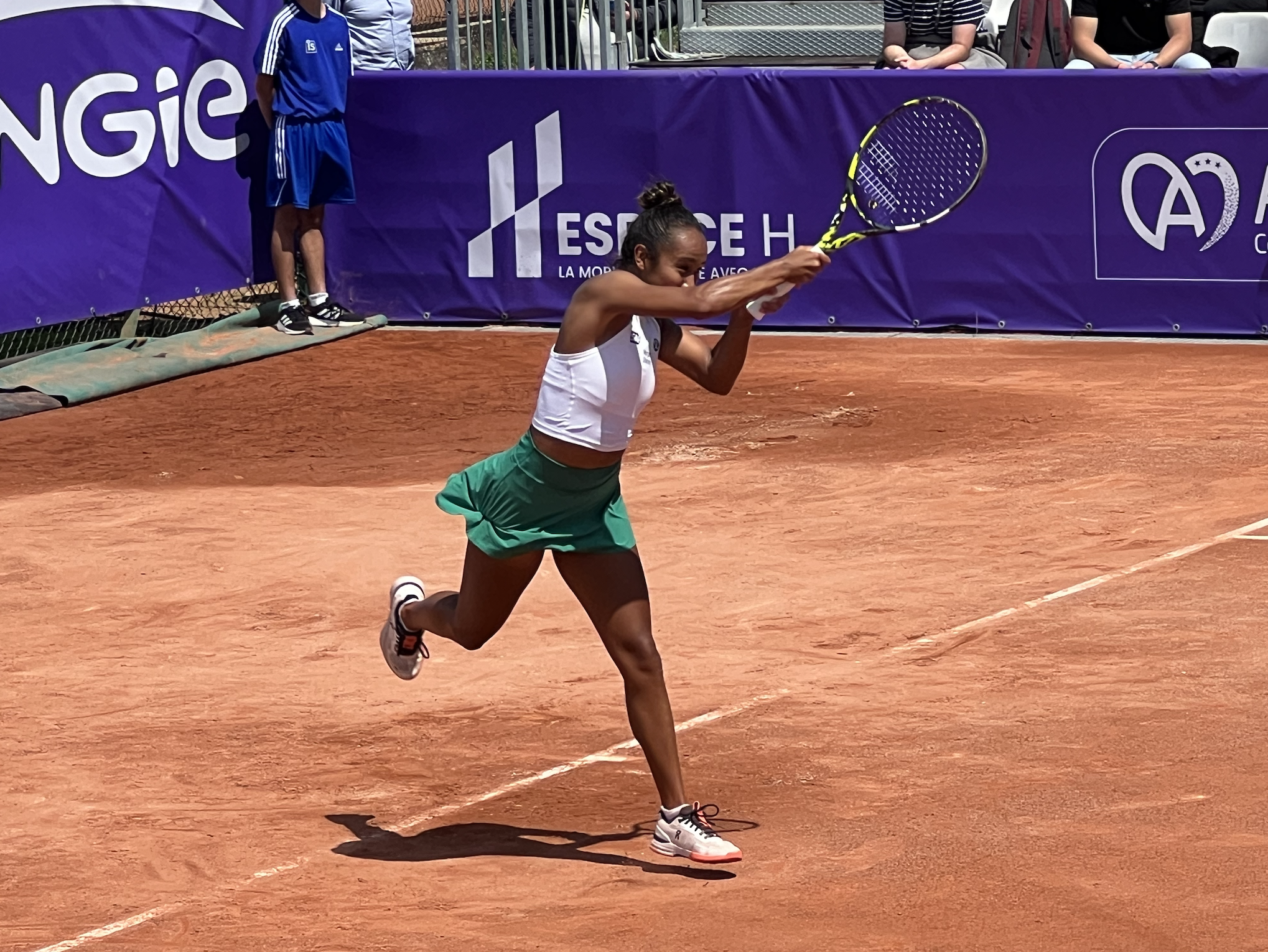
Fernandez hits a backhand in Strasbourg in May 2024.

=== 2024: Cincinnati doubles final ===
At her home tournament, the Canadian Open in Toronto, she reached the doubles semifinals with her sister Bianca where they lost to Gabriela Dabrowski and Erin Routliffe. At the next WTA 1000, the Cincinnati Open, she reached the quarterfinals in singles with victories over fourth seed Elena Rybakina, her first win over a top five ranked opponent since her run to the 2021 US Open final, and Diana Shnaider. She lost in the last four to Jessica Pegula. Partnering with Yulia Putintseva, Fernandez reached the final of the doubles at the same event but the pair lost to Asia Muhammad and Erin Routliffe in a champions tiebreak decider.

=== 2025: Washington Open and Japan Women's Open titles ===
Seeded 30th, Fernandez reached the third round at the Australian Open with wins over Yuliia Starodubtseva and Cristina Bucșa, before losing to third seed Coco Gauff.

At the Abu Dhabi Open, she was seeded eighth and overcame lucky loser Moyuka Uchijima and Lulu Sun to make it through to the quarterfinals, where she lost to Ashlyn Krueger.

Partnering Lulu Sun, Fernandez finished runner-up at the WTA 125 Catalonia Open, losing in the doubles final to Bianca Andreescu and Aldila Sutjiadi.

At the Washington Open, Fernandez won her fourth career title after 21 months, her first WTA 500 title. She defeated Anna Kalinskaya in the final after winning a three-set, three-tiebreaker match against third seed Elena Rybakina one day earlier in the semifinals. In October, she won a WTA 250 title at the Japan Women's Open, defeating qualifier Tereza Valentová in the final.

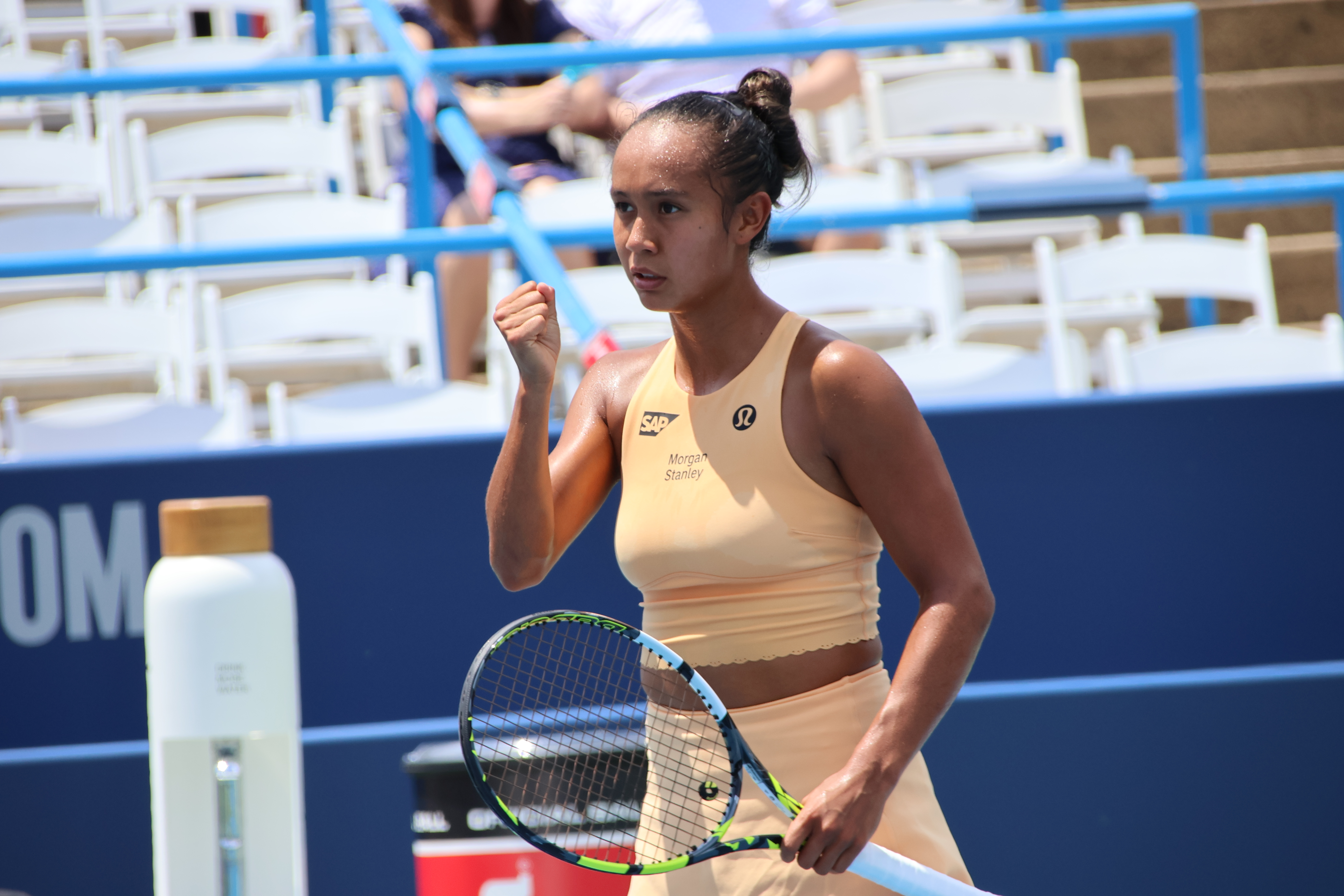
Fernandez at the 2025 Washington Open

=== 2026: Sixth WTA Tour title, return to top 20 ===
In April at the Stuttgart Grand Prix, Fernandez defeated Alexandra Eala and Zeynep Sönmez to reach the quarterfinals, at which point she lost to top seed Elena Rybakina in a match that lasted three hours and went to a third set tiebreak. Later that month at the Madrid Open, she received a bye as 24th seed and then recorded wins over Julia Grabher, 15th seed Iva Jovic and 31st seed Ann Li to make it through to the quarterfinals of a WTA 1000 event for the first time in almost two years. Fernandez lost in the last eight to ninth seed Mirra Andreeva, in straight sets.

Seeded seventh at the Strasbourg Open, she overcame wildcard entrant Léolia Jeanjean and Magdalena Fręch to reach her third WTA quarterfinal of the year, which she lost to top seed and fellow Canadian Victoria Mboko. Teaming up with Laura Siegemund, Fernandez reached the doubles final at the Queen's Club Championships in June, losing to Tereza Mihalíková and Olivia Nicholls in a super tiebreak.

In September at the Singapore Open, she defeated qualifier Kyōka Okamura, Alycia Parks, top seed Mirra Andreeva and fifth seed Maja Chwalińska to make it into the final, where she overcame Talia Gibson to win her sixth WTA Tour singles title. The following month at the Ningbo Open, Fernandez recorded wins over seventh seed Elise Mertens, qualifier Aliaksandra Sasnovich, Ekaterina Alexandrova and Marie Bouzková to reach the final, which she lost to world No. 1 Elena Rybakina. At the Pan Pacific Open, she defeated wildcard entrant Himeno Sakatsume and fifth seed Elise Mertens to make it through to the quarterfinals. Fernandez was then given a walkover into the semifinals when Elena Rybakina withdrew from the tournament due to a neck injury. In the last four she overcame lucky loser Kamilla Rakhimova in straight sets to reach her second final in as many weeks. Fernandez lost the championship match to third seed Diana Shnaider in three sets. Despite her defeat, she returned to the top 20 in the WTA singles rankings for the first time in more than four years at world No. 18 on 2 November 2026.

== Personal life ==
Fernandez is a fan of football clubs Real Madrid and Manchester City. She speaks fluent English, French and Spanish and is studying business at Indiana University East, which has partnership with the WTA and the Women's Tennis Benefits Association that enables players to pursue online bachelor's degrees while competing in tournaments. In April 2026, Fernandez confirmed on social media that she was in a relationship with Canadian ice sled hockey player Vincent Boily.

== Charitable work ==
Fernandez started the Leylah Annie & Family Foundation, a non-profit organization dedicated to providing families with a better quality of life through education and sports.

== Endorsements ==
Fernandez is sponsored by Canadian brand Lululemon for apparel and by French brand Babolat for racquets, currently using the Babolat Pure Aero racquet. In January 2022, she became the first global brand ambassador in tennis for Lululemon. Lululemon replaces her prior apparel sponsor Asics, which she will continue to use for footwear until Lululemon launches its tennis footwear line by the end of 2022. She is also sponsored by wireless telecommunications company Telcel/Claro, cosmetics company Birchbox, Morgan Stanley, and EasyPost. She also is a brand ambassador for Flair Airlines along with fellow Canadians Eugenie Bouchard and Félix Auger-Aliassime. Additional sponsors include USANA, Microsure, and Cambridge Global Payments. In January 2022, she became a Google ambassador in Canada for the Google Pixel 6 and Pixel 6 Pro as well as Gatorade Canada ambassador.

== Career statistics ==
=== Grand Slam tournament performance timelines ===
Key
W	F	SF	QF	#R	RR	Q#	DNQ	A	NH

(W) winner; (F) finalist; (SF) semifinalist; (QF) quarterfinalist; (#R) rounds 4, 3, 2, 1; (RR) round-robin stage; (Q#) qualification round; (DNQ) did not qualify; (A) absent; (NH) not held; (SR) strike rate (events won / competed); (W–L) win–loss record.
To avoid confusion and double counting, these charts are updated at the conclusion of a tournament or when the player's participation has ended.

==== Singles ====
Current through the 2026 US Open.

Tournament	2018	2019	2020	2021	2022	2023	2024	2025	2026	SR	W–L	Win %
Australian Open	A	A	1R	1R	1R	2R	2R	3R	1R	0 / 7	4–7	36%
French Open	A	A	3R	2R	QF	2R	3R	1R	1R	0 / 7	10–7	59%
Wimbledon	A	A	NH	1R	A	2R	2R	2R	1R	0 / 5	3–5	38%
US Open	A	A	2R	F	2R	1R	1R	3R	3R	0 / 7	12–7	63%
Win–loss	0–0	0–0	3–3	7–4	5–3	3–4	4–4	5–4	2–4	0 / 26	29–26	53%

==== Doubles ====
Current through the 2026 US Open.

Tournament	2018	2019	2020	2021	2022	2023	2024	2025	2026	SR	W–L	Win %
Australian Open	A	A	A	3R	1R	1R	A	3R	1R	0 / 5	4–5	44%
French Open	A	A	1R	3R	2R	F	3R	2R	1R	0 / 7	10–7	59%
Wimbledon	A	A	NH	1R	A	2R	3R	1R	1R	0 / 5	3–5	38%
US Open	A	A	A	3R	2R	QF	1R	QF	2R	0 / 6	10–6	67%
Win–loss	0–0	0–0	0–1	5–4	2–3	9–4	4–3	6–4	0–4	0 / 23	27–23	54%

=== Grand Slam tournament finals ===
==== Singles: 1 (runner-up) ====
Result	Year	Tournament	Surface	Opponent	Score
Loss	2021	US Open	Hard	(United Kingdom) Emma Raducanu	4–6, 3–6

==== Doubles: 1 (runner-up) ====
Result	Year	Tournament	Surface	Partner	Opponents	Score
Loss	2023	French Open	Clay	(United States) Taylor Townsend	(Chinese Taipei) Hsieh Su-wei (China) Wang Xinyu	6–1, 6–7^{(5–7)}, 1–6
