= Catherine Harrison (tennis) =

American tennis player (born 1994)

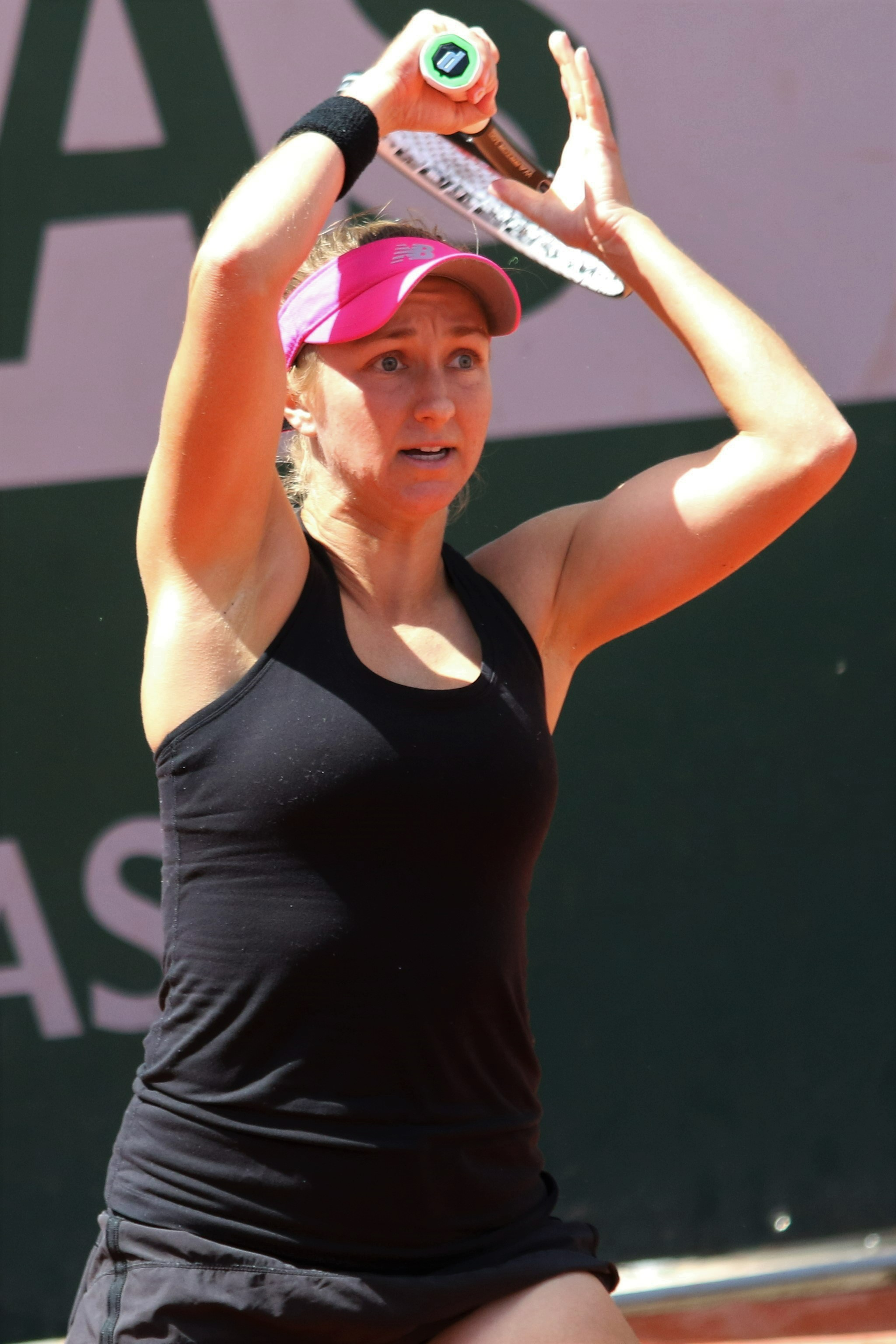
- Harrison at the 2022 French Open
- Country (sports): United States
- Residence: Austin, Texas
- Born: April 9, 1994 (age 32) Memphis, Tennessee
- Height: 1.65 m (5 ft 5 in)
- Plays: Right-handed (two-handed both sides)
- College: UCLA
- Prize money: $524,034

Singles
- Career record: 199–152
- Career titles: 4 ITF
- Highest ranking: No. 214 (September 12, 2022)

Grand Slam singles results
- Wimbledon: 2R (2022)
- US Open: 1R (2022)

Doubles
- Career record: 192–133
- Career titles: 1 WTA, 17 ITF
- Highest ranking: No. 69 (July 11, 2022)
- Current ranking: No. 115 (September 21, 2026)

Grand Slam doubles results
- Australian Open: 1R (2023, 2024)
- French Open: 2R (2022)
- Wimbledon: 2R (2022)
- US Open: 2R (2022, 2024)

Grand Slam mixed doubles results
- US Open: 1R (2022)
- Last updated on: September 24, 2026.

Catherine Elizabeth Frances Harrison (born April 9, 1994) is an American tennis player.

She has career-high WTA rankings of 214 in singles, achieved on 12 September 2022, and No. 69 in doubles, reached on 11 July 2022.

Harrison played college tennis at the University of California, Los Angeles (UCLA).

== Career ==
=== 2011: WTA Tour debut ===
Harrison made her WTA Tour main-draw debut at the 2011 Cellular South Cup, after receiving a wildcard for the singles competition.

=== 2022: Major debut ===
Harrison won her first doubles title at the Monterrey Open, partnering compatriot Sabrina Santamaria and defeating Han Xinyun and Yana Sizikova in the final.

She made her Grand Slam tournament debut at the French Open in doubles. Harrison qualified to make her singles debut at the Wimbledon, defeating Arantxa Rus in the first round then losing her next match to Ajla Tomljanovic. She also qualified for the main draw at the US Open, losing to sixth seed Aryna Sabalenka in the first round.

== Performance timelines ==
Key
W	F	SF	QF	#R	RR	Q#	DNQ	A	NH

(W) winner; (F) finalist; (SF) semifinalist; (QF) quarterfinalist; (#R) rounds 4, 3, 2, 1; (RR) round-robin stage; (Q#) qualification round; (DNQ) did not qualify; (A) absent; (NH) not held; (SR) strike rate (events won / competed); (W–L) win–loss record.
To avoid confusion and double counting, these charts are updated at the conclusion of a tournament or when the player's participation has ended.

Only main-draw results in WTA Tour, Grand Slam tournaments, Billie Jean King Cup and Olympic Games are included in win–loss records.

=== Doubles ===
Tournament	2021	2022	2023	2024	2025	W–L
Grand Slam tournaments						
Australian Open	A	A	1R	1R	A	0–2
French Open	A	2R	A	A	A	1–1
Wimbledon	A	2R	A	A	A	1–1
US Open	A	2R	A	2R	A	2–2
Win–loss	0–0	3–3	0–1	1–2	0–0	4–6
WTA 1000
Madrid Open	A	A	A	A	A	0–0
Italian Open	A	1R	A	A	A	0–1
Canadian Open	QF	1R	A	2R	QF	4–4
Cincinnati Open	A	A	A	A	A	0–0

== WTA Tour finals ==
=== Doubles: 1 (title) ===
Legend WTA 250 (1–0)	Finals by surface Hard (1–0)

Result	Date	Tournament	Tier	Surface	Partner	Opponents	Score
Win	Mar 2022	Monterrey Open, Mexico	WTA 250	Hard	(United States) Sabrina Santamaria	(China) Han Xinyun (Russia) Yana Sizikova	1–6, 7–5, [10–6]

== WTA 125 finals ==
=== Doubles: 1 (title) ===
Result	W–L	Date	Tournament	Surface	Partner	Opponents	Score
Win	1–0	Oct 2026	Courmayeur Ladies Open, Italy	Hard {i}	(United States) Dalayna Hewitt	(United Kingdom) Madeleine Brooks (Sweden) Lisa Zaar	6–4, 6–4

== ITF Circuit finals ==
=== Singles: 7 (4 titles, 3 runner-ups) ===
Legend W50 tournaments W25/35 tournaments W10/15 tournaments	Finals by surface Hard (4–2) Clay (0–1)

Result	W–L	Date	Tournament	Tier	Surface	Opponent	Score
Loss	0–1	Oct 2010	ITF Amelia Island, United States	W10	Clay	(United States) Lauren Herring	2–6, 3–6
Loss	0–2	Nov 2018	ITF Lawrence, United States	W25	Hard	(United States) Caty McNally	2–6, 2–6
Win	1–2	Aug 2019	ITF Fort Worth, United States	W25	Hard	(United States) Chanelle Van Nguyen	6–4, 6–0
Win	2–2	Oct 2021	ITF Redding, United States	W25	Hard	(Slovenia) Dalila Jakupović	6–1, 6–1
Win	3–2	Mar 2024	ITF Brossard, Canada	W15	Hard (i)	(United States) Jessie Aney	4–6, 6–1, 6–3
Win	4–2	Mar 2024	Kōfu International Open, Japan	W50	Hard	(Chinese Taipei) Lee Ya-hsuan	6–7^{(8)}, 6–1, 6–1
Loss	4–3	Jun 2024	ITF Santo Domingo, Dominican Republic	W35	Hard	(United States) Victoria Hu	4–6, 7–6^{(6)}, 4–6

=== Doubles: 29 (17 titles, 12 runner-ups) ===
Legend W100 tournaments W80 tournaments W60 tournaments W50 tournaments W25/35 tournaments W10/15 tournaments	Finals by surface Hard (14–11) Clay (3–0) Grass (0–1)

Result	W–L	Date	Tournament	Tier	Surface	Partner	Opponents	Score
Loss	0–1	Jul 2014	ITF Evansville, United States	W10	Hard	(United States) Mary Weatherholt	(United States) Brooke Austin (United States) Natalie Pluskota	4–6, 6–3, [9–11]
Win	1–1	Jul 2014	ITF Austin, US	W10	Hard	(United States) Mary Weatherholt	(United States) Alexandra Cercone (United States) Alexa Guarachi	6–2, 7–5
Loss	1–2	Aug 2014	ITF Fort Worth, US	W10	Hard	(United States) Mary Weatherholt	(United States) Hayley Carter (Singapore) Stefanie Tan	3–6, 3–6
Win	2–2	Jul 2016	ITF Austin, US	W10	Hard	(United States) Lorraine Guillermo	(United States) Madison Harrison (United States) Stephanie Nauta	6–3, 6–3
Win	3–2	Sep 2016	ITF Lubbock, US	W25	Hard	(United States) Emina Bektas	(Bosnia and Herzegovina) Ema Burgić Bucko (Mexico) Renata Zarazúa	6–3, 6–4
Win	4–2	Nov 2016	ITF Nashville, US	W25	Hard	(United States) Madeleine Kobelt	(United States) Melissa Kopinski (United States) Felicity Maltby	6–3, 6–0
Win	5–2	Mar 2018	ITF Antalya, Turkey	W15	Clay	(United States) Sarah Lee	(Russia) Amina Anshba (Turkey) Melis Sezer	6–4, 6–3
Loss	5–3	May 2019	ITF Singapore	W25	Hard	(United Kingdom) Emily Appleton	(New Zealand) Paige Hourigan (Indonesia) Aldila Sutjiadi	1–6, 6–7^{(5)}
Loss	5–4	Sep 2019	ITF Redding, US	W25	Hard	(New Zealand) Paige Hourigan	(United States) Emina Bektas (United Kingdom) Tara Moore	3–6, 1–6
Win	6–4	Feb 2020	Kentucky Open, US	W100	Hard (i)	(United States) Quinn Gleason	(United States) Whitney Osuigwe (United States) Hailey Baptiste	7–5, 6–2
Win	7–4	May 2021	ITF Naples, US	W25	Clay	(Norway) Ulrikke Eikeri	(Japan) Erina Hayashi (Japan) Kanako Morisaki	6–2, 3–6, [10–2]
Win	8–4	Jun 2021	ITF Sumter, US	W25	Hard	(United States) Emina Bektas	(New Zealand) Paige Hourigan (Indonesia) Aldila Sutjiadi	7–5, 6–4
Win	9–4	Oct 2021	Tennis Classic of Macon, US	W80	Hard	(United States) Quinn Gleason	(United States) Alycia Parks (United States) Alana Smith	6–2, 6–2
Loss	9–5	Jan 2022	Traralgon International, Australia	W60+H	Hard	(Indonesia) Aldila Sutjiadi	(United States) Emina Bektas (United Kingdom) Tara Moore	6–0, 6–7^{(1)}, [8–10]
Loss	9–6	Feb 2022	ITF Birmingham, UK	W25	Hard (i)	(United States) Quinn Gleason	(Lithuania) Andrė Lukošiūtė (United Kingdom) Eliz Maloney	6–7^{(4)}, 6–3, [8–10]
Win	10–6	Feb 2022	GB Pro-Series Glasgow, UK	W25	Hard (i)	(United States) Quinn Gleason	(Lithuania) Justina Mikulskytė (Russia) Valeria Savinykh	6–4, 6–1
Win	11–6	Apr 2022	ITF Orlando, US	W25	Clay	(United States) Maegan Manasse	(Chinese Taipei) Hsieh Yu-chieh (Chinese Taipei) Hsu Chieh-yu	6–1, 6–0
Loss	11–7	Jun 2022	Surbiton Trophy, UK	W100	Grass	(Mexico) Fernanda Contreras	(United States) Ingrid Neel (Netherlands) Rosalie van der Hoek	3–6, 3–6
Loss	11–8	Oct 2022	Challenger de Saguenay, Canada	W60	Hard (i)	(Belgium) Yanina Wickmayer	(Netherlands) Arianne Hartono (Australia) Olivia Tjandramulia	7–5, 6–7^{(3)}, [8–10]
Win	12–8	Nov 2022	Calgary Challenger, Canada	W60	Hard (i)	(United States) Sabrina Santamaria	(Canada) Kayla Cross (Canada) Marina Stakusic	7–6^{(2)}, 6–4
Win	13–8	May 2024	ITF Lopota, Georgia	W50	Hard	(Australia) Elysia Bolton	(Russia) Anastasia Zolotareva; Rada Zolotareva	6–4, 6–2
Loss	13–9	Jun 2025	ITF Wichita, US	W35	Hard	(United States) Christina Rosca	(Spain) Maria Berlanga Bandera (Mexico) Julia García Ruiz	5–7, 5–7
Win	14–9	Aug 2025	ITF Southaven, US	W35	Hard	(United States) Ashley Lahey	(Japan) Hiroko Kuwata (Japan) Kyōka Okamura	6–3, 6–2
Loss	14–10	Sep 2025	ITF Leiria, Portugal	W50	Hard	(United States) Ashley Lahey	(France) Julie Belgraver (Canada) Kayla Cross	6–3, 3–6, [8–10]
Win	15–10	Sep 2025	ITF Évora, Portugal	W50	Hard	(United States) Ashley Lahey	(Czech Republic) Gabriela Knutson (United States) Malaika Rapolu	6–1, 1–6, [10–8]
Loss	15–11	Jan 2026	ITF San Diego, US	W100	Hard	(United States) Dalayna Hewitt	(Canada) Kayla Cross (United States) Alana Smith	2–6, 3–6
Loss	15–12	Apr 2026	Kangaroo Cup, Japan	W100	Hard	(United States) Dalayna Hewitt	(United Kingdom) Harriet Dart (United Kingdom) Heather Watson	6–3, 3–6, [4–10]
Win	16–12	Jun 2026	Palmetto Pro Open, United States	W100	Hard	(Australia) Alexandra Osborne	(United States) Anna Rogers (United States) Allura Zamarripa	6–4, 4–6, [10–7]
Win	17–12	Jun 2026	Cary Tennis Classic, United States	W100	Hard	(United States) Dalayna Hewitt	(Japan) Hiroko Kuwata (India) Ankita Raina	6–4, 6–2

== Head-to-head records ==
=== Record against top-10 players ===
Result	W–L	Opponent	Rank	Event	Surface	Round	Score	Rank	H2H
2022
Loss	0–1	Aryna Sabalenka	No. 6	US Open, United States	Hard	1R	1–6, 3–6	No. 243	0–1
