= 2026 Bengaluru Open II =

- Date: 11 – 16 May
- Edition: 11th
- Surface: Hard
- Location: Bangalore, India

Champions

Singles
- (United States) Keegan Smith

Doubles
- (India) Niki Kaliyanda Poonacha / (India) Saketh Myneni
- Bengaluru Open

The 2026 Bengaluru Open II was a professional tennis tournament played on hard courts. It was the 11th edition of the tournament which was part of the 2026 ATP Challenger Tour. It took place in Bangalore, India from 11 to 16 May 2026.

== Singles main-draw entrants ==
=== Seeds ===
Country	Player	Rank^{1}	Seed
USA	Keegan Smith	289	1
GBR	Hamish Stewart	328	2
	Petr Bar Biryukov	337	3
AUS	Philip Sekulic	357	4
SRB	Ognjen Milić	395	5
IND	Karan Singh	413	6
THA	Maximus Jones	442	7
MEX	Alex Hernández	444	8

- ^{1} Rankings are as of 4 May 2026.

=== Other entrants ===
The following players received wildcards into the singles main draw:

- (India) Dev Javia
- (India) Maan Kesharwani
- (India) Kriish Tyagi

The following players received entry from the qualifying draw:

- (United Kingdom) Alastair Gray
- (United States) Ronit Karki
- (United States) Christopher Papa
- (Japan) Ryotaro Taguchi
- (India) Aditya Vishal Balsekar
- (Japan) Taiyo Yamanaka

== Champions ==
=== Singles ===
- (United States) Keegan Smith def. (Australia) Philip Sekulic 6–2, 7–5.

=== Doubles ===
- (India) Niki Kaliyanda Poonacha / (India) Saketh Myneni def. Petr Bar Biryukov / (Kazakhstan) Grigoriy Lomakin 6–2, 6–3.
