= 2022 Pereira Challenger – Singles =

Singles
- 2022 Pereira Challenger

Final
- Champion: (Argentina) Facundo Bagnis
- Runner-up: (Argentina) Facundo Mena
- Score: 6–3, 6–0

Events
Singles	Doubles
- Pereira Challenger

This was the first edition of the tournament.

Facundo Bagnis won the title after defeating Facundo Mena 6–3, 6–0 in the final.

== Seeds ==
1. (Argentina) Facundo Bagnis (champion)
2. (Argentina) Tomás Martín Etcheverry (semifinals)
3. (Peru) Juan Pablo Varillas (semifinals)
4. (United States) Stefan Kozlov (first round)
5. (Argentina) Facundo Mena (final)
6. (Netherlands) Jesper de Jong (first round)
7. (Argentina) Thiago Agustín Tirante (quarterfinals)
8. (Argentina) Nicolás Kicker (second round)

== Draw ==
Key

- Q = Qualifier
- WC = Wild card
- LL = Lucky loser
- Alt = Alternate
- ITF = ITF entry
- PR = Protected ranking
- SR = Special ranking
- SE = Special exempt
- JE = Junior exempt
- JR = Junior Accelerator Programme entrant
- CO = College Accelerator Programme entrant
- NG = Next Gen Accelerator Program entrant
- w/o = Walkover
- r = Retired
- d = Defaulted

=== Finals ===
Semifinals
1	(Argentina) Facundo Bagnis	6	6
3	(Peru) Juan Pablo Varillas	4	4
5	(Argentina) Facundo Mena	2	6	6
2	(Argentina) Tomás Martín Etcheverry	6	4	4

Final
1	(Argentina) Facundo Bagnis	6	6
5	(Argentina) Facundo Mena	3	0

=== Top half ===
First round
1	(Argentina) F Bagnis	7	0
(Austria) G Melzer	5	0^{r}
WC	(Colombia) Mateo Gómez	1	4
LL	(Argentina) JB Torres	6	6
(Switzerland) A Ritschard	4	6	2
WC	(Colombia) N Barrientos	6	0	6
(Canada) S Diez	3	6^{4}
8	(Argentina) N Kicker	6	7^{7}
3	(Peru) JP Varillas	6	6
(Argentina) GA Olivieri	0	2
Q	(Ukraine) O Prihodko	5	6	3
WC	(Colombia) A González	7	4	6
(Brazil) M Pucinelli de Almeida	6	3	4
Q	(Israel) Y Oliel	3	6	6
(Chile) G Lama	6^{6}	4
7	(Argentina) TA Tirante	7^{8}	6

Second round
1	(Argentina) F Bagnis	2	6	6
LL	(Argentina) JB Torres	6	3	3
WC	(Colombia) N Barrientos	6	3	6
8	(Argentina) N Kicker	3	6	3
3	(Peru) JP Varillas	6	6
WC	(Colombia) A González	1	2
Q	(Israel) Y Oliel	4	6	5
7	(Argentina) TA Tirante	6	3	7

Quarterfinals
1	(Argentina) F Bagnis	6	6
WC	(Colombia) N Barrientos	2	2
3	(Peru) JP Varillas	6	3	6
7	(Argentina) TA Tirante	2	6	3

Semifinals
1	(Argentina) F Bagnis	6	6
3	(Peru) JP Varillas	4	4

=== Bottom half ===
First round
5	(Argentina) F Mena	6	6
Alt	(Brazil) D Dutra da Silva	4	2
Q	(Argentina) Facundo Juárez	7^{7}	2	5
(United States) N Moreno de Alboran	6^{5}	6	7
(Argentina) JP Ficovich	6	3	6
Q	(Germany) Elmar Ejupovic	3	6	3
(Colombia) N Mejía	6	6
4	(United States) S Kozlov	1	1
6	(Netherlands) J de Jong	6^{7}	3
Q	(Ecuador) R Quiroz	7^{9}	6
Alt	(Serbia) P Krstin	3	6	6
(Portugal) G Oliveira	6	4	3
(Argentina) A Collarini	4	4
(Brazil) F Meligeni Alves	6	6
Q	(Colombia) JS Gómez	4	5
2	(Argentina) TM Etcheverry	6	7

Second round
5	(Argentina) F Mena	6	2	6
(United States) N Moreno de Alboran	3	6	4
(Argentina) JP Ficovich	3	6	6
(Colombia) N Mejía	6	4	1
Q	(Ecuador) R Quiroz	6^{7}	4
Alt	(Serbia) P Krstin	7^{9}	6
(Brazil) F Meligeni Alves	1	5
2	(Argentina) TM Etcheverry	6	7

Quarterfinals
5	(Argentina) F Mena	4	7^{7}	6
(Argentina) JP Ficovich	6	6^{4}	1
Alt	(Serbia) P Krstin	2	6^{4}
2	(Argentina) TM Etcheverry	6	7^{7}

Semifinals
5	(Argentina) F Mena	2	6	6
2	(Argentina) TM Etcheverry	6	4	4
