= 2022 Pereira Challenger – Doubles =

Doubles
- 2022 Pereira Challenger

Final
- Champions: (Venezuela) Luis David Martínez (Colombia) Cristian Rodríguez
- Runners-up: (Kazakhstan) Grigoriy Lomakin (Ukraine) Oleg Prihodko
- Score: 7–6^{(7–2)}, 7–6^{(7–3)}

Events
Singles	Doubles
- Pereira Challenger

This was the first edition of the tournament.

Luis David Martínez and Cristian Rodríguez won the title after defeating Grigoriy Lomakin and Oleg Prihodko 7–6^{(7–2)}, 7–6^{(7–3)} in the final.

== Seeds ==
1. (Colombia) Nicolás Barrientos / (Mexico) Miguel Ángel Reyes-Varela (semifinals)
2. (Peru) Sergio Galdós / (Portugal) Gonçalo Oliveira (quarterfinals)
3. (India) Jeevan Nedunchezhiyan / (Brazil) Fernando Romboli (first round)
4. (Venezuela) Luis David Martínez / (Colombia) Cristian Rodríguez (champions)

== Draw ==
Key

- Q = Qualifier
- WC = Wild card
- LL = Lucky loser
- Alt = Alternate
- ITF = ITF entry
- PR = Protected ranking
- SR = Special ranking
- SE = Special exempt
- JE = Junior exempt
- JR = Junior Accelerator Programme entrant
- CO = College Accelerator Programme entrant
- NG = Next Gen Accelerator Program entrant
- w/o = Walkover
- r = Retired
- d = Defaulted

First round
1	(Colombia) N Barrientos (Mexico) MÁ Reyes-Varela	6	4	[10]
(Colombia) N Mejía (Brazil) M Pucinelli de Almeida	2	6	[5]
PR	(Zimbabwe) B Lock (Zimbabwe) CJ Lock	4	5
Alt	(Argentina) JP Ficovich (Argentina) Matías Zukas	6	7
3	(India) J Nedunchezhiyan (Brazil) F Romboli	4	6^{4}
(Brazil) Gilbert Klier Júnior (Brazil) F Meligeni Alves	6	7^{7}
(Brazil) M Alves (Brazil) G Heide	3	6	[10]
(Netherlands) J de Jong (Netherlands) B Stevens	6	3	[5]
(Brazil) D Dutra da Silva (Peru) A Merino	1	2
4	(Venezuela) LD Martínez (Colombia) C Rodríguez	6	6
(Argentina) TA Tirante (Argentina) JB Torres	5	4
WC	(Colombia) JS Gómez (Colombia) Alejandro Hoyos	7	6
WC	(Colombia) Johan Rodríguez (Colombia) A Urrea	6^{4}	6^{5}
2	(Peru) S Galdós (Portugal) G Oliveira	7^{7}	7^{7}

Quarterfinals
1	(Colombia) N Barrientos (Mexico) MÁ Reyes-Varela	w/o
Alt	(Argentina) JP Ficovich (Argentina) M Zukas
(Brazil) G Klier Júnior (Brazil) F Meligeni Alves	6	2^{r}
Alt	(Kazakhstan) G Lomakin (Ukraine) O Prihodko	3	2
(Brazil) M Alves (Brazil) G Heide	3	6	[8]
4	(Venezuela) LD Martínez (Colombia) C Rodríguez	6	4	[10]
WC	(Colombia) JS Gómez (Colombia) A Hoyos	6	7
2	(Peru) S Galdós (Portugal) G Oliveira	4	5

Semifinals
1	(Colombia) N Barrientos (Mexico) MÁ Reyes-Varela	4	6^{3}
Alt	(Kazakhstan) G Lomakin (Ukraine) O Prihodko	6	7^{7}
4	(Venezuela) LD Martínez (Colombia) C Rodríguez	6	6
WC	(Colombia) JS Gómez (Colombia) A Hoyos	2	3

Final
Alt	(Kazakhstan) G Lomakin (Ukraine) O Prihodko	6^{2}	6^{3}
4	(Venezuela) LD Martínez (Colombia) C Rodríguez	7^{7}	7^{7}
