= 2025 Challenger La Manche =

- Date: 10–16 March
- Edition: 32nd
- Surface: Hard (indoor)
- Location: Cherbourg, France

Champions

Singles
- (France) Pierre-Hugues Herbert

Doubles
- (Ukraine) Oleg Prihodko / (Ukraine) Vitaliy Sachko
- Challenger La Manche

The 2025 Challenger La Manche was a professional tennis tournament played on indoor hard courts. It was the 32nd edition of the tournament which was part of the 2025 ATP Challenger Tour. It took place in Cherbourg, France between 10 and 16 March 2025.

== Singles main-draw entrants ==
=== Seeds ===
Country	Player	Rank^{1}	Seed
FRA	Pierre-Hugues Herbert	180	1
	Alibek Kachmazov	186	2
~~FRA~~	~~Titouan Droguet~~	~~193~~	~~3~~
JPN	Yuta Shimizu	197	4
FRA	Antoine Escoffier	206	5
AUT	Jurij Rodionov	209	6
BEL	Gauthier Onclin	212	7
KAZ	Beibit Zhukayev	213	8

- ^{1} Rankings are as of 3 March 2025.

=== Other entrants ===
The following players received wildcards into the singles main draw:

- (France) Kenny de Schepper
- (France) Maé Malige
- (France) Loann Massard

The following player received entry into the singles main draw as an alternate:

- (Switzerland) Jakub Paul

The following players received entry from the qualifying draw:

- (United Kingdom) Arthur Fery
- (Germany) Tom Gentzsch
- Egor Gerasimov
- (France) Adrien Gobat
- (Slovakia) Lukáš Pokorný
- (France) Cyril Vandermeersch

The following players received entry as lucky losers:

- (Ukraine) Vitaliy Sachko
- (Germany) Patrick Zahraj

== Champions ==
=== Singles ===
- (France) Pierre-Hugues Herbert def. (Netherlands) Jelle Sels 6–3, 6–4.

=== Doubles ===
- (Ukraine) Oleg Prihodko / (Ukraine) Vitaliy Sachko def. (Slovakia) Lukáš Pokorný / (Italy) Giorgio Ricca 6–2, 6–2.
