= 2022 Pereira Challenger =

- Date: 28 March–4 April
- Edition: 1st
- Surface: Clay
- Location: Pereira, Colombia

Champions

Singles
- (Argentina) Facundo Bagnis

Doubles
- (Venezuela) Luis David Martínez / (Colombia) Cristian Rodríguez
Pereira Challenger	· 2023 →

The 2022 Pereira Challenger was a professional tennis tournament played on clay courts. It was the first edition of the tournament which was part of the 2022 ATP Challenger Tour. It took place in Pereira, Colombia between 28 March and 4 April 2022.

== Singles main-draw entrants ==
=== Seeds ===
Country	Player	Rank^{1}	Seed
ARG	Facundo Bagnis	104	1
ARG	Tomás Martín Etcheverry	108	2
PER	Juan Pablo Varillas	119	3
USA	Stefan Kozlov	120	4
ARG	Facundo Mena	181	5
NED	Jesper de Jong	189	6
ARG	Thiago Agustín Tirante	197	7
ARG	Nicolás Kicker	203	8

- ^{1} Rankings are as of 21 March 2022.

=== Other entrants ===
The following players received wildcards into the singles main draw:

- (Colombia) Nicolás Barrientos
- (Colombia) Mateo Gómez
- (Colombia) Alejandro González

The following player received entry into the singles main draw as a special exempt:

- (United Kingdom) ~~Paul Jubb~~

The following players received entry into the singles main draw as alternates:

- (Brazil) Daniel Dutra da Silva
- (Serbia) Peđa Krstin

The following players received entry from the qualifying draw:

- (Germany) Elmar Ejupovic
- (Colombia) Juan Sebastián Gómez
- (Argentina) Facundo Juárez
- (Israel) Yshai Oliel
- (Ukraine) Oleg Prihodko
- (Ecuador) Roberto Quiroz

The following player received entry as a lucky loser:

- (Argentina) Juan Bautista Torres

== Champions ==
=== Singles ===
- (Argentina) Facundo Bagnis def. (Argentina) Facundo Mena 6–3, 6–0.

=== Doubles ===
- (Venezuela) Luis David Martínez / (Colombia) Cristian Rodríguez def. (Kazakhstan) Grigoriy Lomakin / (Ukraine) Oleg Prihodko 7–6^{(7–2)}, 7–6^{(7–3)}.
