= 2025 Challenger La Manche – Singles =

Singles
- 2025 Challenger La Manche

Final
- Champion: (France) Pierre-Hugues Herbert
- Runner-up: (Netherlands) Jelle Sels
- Score: 6–3, 6–4

Events
Singles	Doubles
- Challenger La Manche

Zsombor Piros was the defending champion but chose not to defend his title.

Pierre-Hugues Herbert won the title after defeating Jelle Sels 6–3, 6–4 in the final.

== Seeds ==
1. (France) Pierre-Hugues Herbert (champion)
2. Alibek Kachmazov (first round)
3. (France) Titouan Droguet (withdrew)
4. (Japan) Yuta Shimizu (quarterfinals)
5. (France) Antoine Escoffier (first round)
6. (Austria) Jurij Rodionov (semifinals)
7. (Belgium) Gauthier Onclin (second round)
8. (Kazakhstan) Beibit Zhukayev (first round)

== Draw ==
Key

- Q = Qualifier
- WC = Wild card
- LL = Lucky loser
- Alt = Alternate
- ITF = ITF entry
- PR = Protected ranking
- SR = Special ranking
- SE = Special exempt
- JE = Junior exempt
- JR = Junior Accelerator Programme entrant
- CO = College Accelerator Programme entrant
- NG = Next Gen Accelerator Program entrant
- w/o = Walkover
- r = Retired
- d = Defaulted

=== Finals ===
Semifinals
1	(France) Pierre-Hugues Herbert	6	6
6	(Austria) Jurij Rodionov	4	2
(Netherlands) Jelle Sels	6	6^{2}	6
LL	(Germany) Patrick Zahraj	3	7^{7}	3

Final
1	(France) Pierre-Hugues Herbert	6	6
(Netherlands) Jelle Sels	3	4

=== Top half ===
First round
1	(France) P-H Herbert	2	6	6
(France) C Chidekh	6	3	3
(France) A Bouquier	6^{3}	6	6
(France) S Gueymard Wayenburg	7^{7}	4	2
(Ukraine) O Prihodko	4	6	3
(Finland) E Ruusuvuori	6	1	6
(South Africa) P Henning	1	3
7	(Belgium) G Onclin	6	6
Q	(Slovakia) L Pokorný	6	4	5
(France) M Martineau	4	6	7
(Norway) V Durasovic	2	4
WC	(France) K de Schepper	6	6
Q	(Germany) T Gentzsch	4	6	4
WC	(France) Loann Massard	6	3	6
Alt	(Switzerland) J Paul	2	3
6	(Austria) J Rodionov	6	6

Second round
1	(France) P-H Herbert	6	3	6
(France) A Bouquier	3	6	3
(Finland) E Ruusuvuori	6	6
7	(Belgium) G Onclin	4	3
(France) M Martineau	7^{7}	4	7^{7}
WC	(France) K de Schepper	6^{2}	6	6^{5}
WC	(France) L Massard	3	1
6	(Austria) J Rodionov	6	6

Quarterfinals
1	(France) P-H Herbert	7^{7}	6
(Finland) E Ruusuvuori	6^{5}	1
(France) M Martineau	3	3
6	(Austria) J Rodionov	6	6

Semifinals
1	(France) P-H Herbert	6	6
6	(Austria) J Rodionov	4	2

=== Bottom half ===
First round
5	(France) A Escoffiier	4	4
(Netherlands) J Sels	6	6
Q	(France) Adrien Gobat	6	6
(United Kingdom) P Jubb	3	4
(France) M Janvier	6	2	6
LL	(Ukraine) V Sachko	3	6	3
(Kazakhstan) D Yevseyev	2	6	3
4	(Japan) Y Shimizu	6	3	6
8	(Kazakhstan) B Zhukayev	3	6	4
WC	(France) Maé Malige	6	2	6
LL	(Germany) P Zahraj	6	6
A Vatutin	1	4
Q	E Gerasimov	7^{7}	6^{5}	4
Q	(United Kingdom) A Fery	6^{2}	7^{7}	6
Q	(France) Cyril Vandermeersch	7	6
2	A Kachmazov	5	3

Second round
(Netherlands) J Sels	6	6
Q	(France) A Gobat	4	1
(France) M Janvier	2	6^{6}
4	(Japan) Y Shimizu	6	7^{8}
WC	(France) M Malige	6	3	3
LL	(Germany) P Zahraj	4	6	6
Q	(United Kingdom) A Fery	6	6
Q	(France) C Vandermeersch	2	2

Quarterfinals
(Netherlands) J Sels	7	6
4	(Japan) Y Shimizu	5	3
LL	(Germany) P Zahraj	7	6
Q	(United Kingdom) A Fery	5	1

Semifinals
(Netherlands) J Sels	6	6^{2}	6
LL	(Germany) P Zahraj	3	7^{7}	3
