= 2022 US Open – Men's doubles =

Men's doubles
- 2022 US Open

Final
- Champions: (United States) Rajeev Ram (United Kingdom) Joe Salisbury
- Runners-up: (Netherlands) Wesley Koolhof (United Kingdom) Neal Skupski
- Score: 7–6^{(7–4)}, 7–5

Events
Singles	men	women		boys	girls
Doubles	men	women	mixed	boys	girls
WC Singles	men	women	quad
WC Doubles	men	women	quad
Legends	men	women	mixed
- US Open

Defending champions Rajeev Ram and Joe Salisbury defeated Wesley Koolhof and Neal Skupski in the final, 7–6^{(7–4)}, 7–5 to win the men's doubles tennis title at the 2022 US Open. They became the second team in the Open Era to defend the US Open title, after Todd Woodbridge and Mark Woodforde in 1996. It was both men's fifth major title.

Salisbury retained his ATP number 1 doubles ranking by winning the championship. Michael Venus, Horacio Zeballos, Mate Pavić, Jean-Julien Rojer, and Skupski were also in contention for the top ranking.

This tournament marked the final professional appearance of former doubles world No. 2 and six-time doubles major champion Bruno Soares; partnering with Jamie Murray, he lost in the second round to Hugo Nys and Jan Zieliński.

This is the first edition of US Open to feature a 10-point tie-break, when the score reaches six games all in the deciding set. Marcelo Demoliner and João Sousa defeated Marcel Granollers and Zeballos in the first round in the first main-draw 10-point tie-break at US Open.

== Seeds ==
1. (United States) Rajeev Ram / (United Kingdom) Joe Salisbury (champions)
2. (Netherlands) Wesley Koolhof / (United Kingdom) Neal Skupski (final)
3. (El Salvador) Marcelo Arévalo / (Netherlands) Jean-Julien Rojer (semifinals)
4. (Germany) Tim Pütz / (New Zealand) Michael Venus (third round)
5. (Spain) Marcel Granollers / (Argentina) Horacio Zeballos (first round)
6. (Croatia) Nikola Mektić / (Croatia) Mate Pavić (quarterfinals)
7. (Croatia) Ivan Dodig / (United States) Austin Krajicek (second round)
8. (Australia) Thanasi Kokkinakis / (Australia) Nick Kyrgios (third round)
9. (India) Rohan Bopanna / (Netherlands) Matwé Middelkoop (first round)
10. (United Kingdom) Jamie Murray / (Brazil) Bruno Soares (second round)
11. (United Kingdom) Lloyd Glasspool / (Finland) Harri Heliövaara (quarterfinals)
12. (Germany) Kevin Krawietz / (Germany) Andreas Mies (second round)
13. (Colombia) Juan Sebastián Cabal / (Colombia) Robert Farah (semifinals)
14. (Mexico) Santiago González / (Argentina) Andrés Molteni (first round)
15. (Italy) Simone Bolelli / (Italy) Fabio Fognini (third round)
16. (France) Nicolas Mahut / (France) Édouard Roger-Vasselin (first round)

Click on the seed number of a player to go to their draw section.

== Draw ==
Key

- Q = Qualifier
- WC = Wild card
- LL = Lucky loser
- Alt = Alternate
- ITF = ITF entry
- PR = Protected ranking
- SR = Special ranking
- SE = Special exempt
- JE = Junior exempt
- JR = Junior Accelerator Programme entrant
- CO = College Accelerator Programme entrant
- NG = Next Gen Accelerator Program entrant
- w/o = Walkover
- r = Retired
- d = Defaulted

=== Finals ===
Quarterfinals
1	(United States) Rajeev Ram (United Kingdom) Joe Salisbury	6	6^{3}	6
(Monaco) Hugo Nys (Poland) Jan Zieliński	4	7^{7}	4
13	(Colombia) Juan Sebastián Cabal (Colombia) Robert Farah	7^{7}	6
11	(United Kingdom) Lloyd Glasspool (Finland) Harri Heliövaara	6^{5}	2
6	(Croatia) Nikola Mektić (Croatia) Mate Pavić	3	4
3	(El Salvador) Marcelo Arévalo (Netherlands) Jean-Julien Rojer	6	6
PR	(Brazil) Marcelo Demoliner (Portugal) João Sousa	3	1
2	(Netherlands) Wesley Koolhof (United Kingdom) Neal Skupski	6	6

Semifinals
1	(United States) Rajeev Ram (United Kingdom) Joe Salisbury	7	4	7^{10}
13	(Colombia) Juan Sebastián Cabal (Colombia) Robert Farah	5	6	6^{6}
3	(El Salvador) Marcelo Arévalo (Netherlands) Jean-Julien Rojer	4	5
2	(Netherlands) Wesley Koolhof (United Kingdom) Neal Skupski	6	7

Final
1	(United States) Rajeev Ram (United Kingdom) Joe Salisbury	7^{7}	7
2	(Netherlands) Wesley Koolhof (United Kingdom) Neal Skupski	6^{4}	5

=== Top half ===
==== Section 1 ====
First round
1	(United States) R Ram (United Kingdom) J Salisbury	6	6
(Argentina) F Coria (Colombia) C Rodríguez	4	4
PR	(Belgium) S Gillé (Poland) Ł Kubot	7^{7}	6^{7}	2
A Karatsev (Australia) L Saville	6^{4}	7^{9}	6
WC	(United States) N Monroe (United States) K Smith	7^{8}	6
(Hungary) M Fucsovics (Slovakia) A Molčan	6^{6}	3
(Serbia) N Ćaćić (India) R Ramanathan	4	4
15	(Italy) S Bolelli (Italy) F Fognini	6	6
10	(United Kingdom) J Murray (Brazil) B Soares	6	6
WC	(United States) H Reese (United States) M Schnur	3	3
(Monaco) H Nys (Poland) J Zieliński	7^{8}	6
(France) F Martin (United Kingdom) J O'Mara	6^{6}	1
(Spain) A Ramos Viñolas (Spain) B Zapata Miralles	4	0
(Uruguay) A Behar (Ecuador) G Escobar	6	6
Alt	(Germany) D Altmaier (Brazil) T Monteiro	6^{5}	2
7	(Croatia) I Dodig (United States) A Krajicek	7^{7}	6

Second round
1	(United States) R Ram (United Kingdom) J Salisbury	6	6
A Karatsev (Australia) L Saville	4	3
WC	(United States) N Monroe (United States) K Smith	6^{4}	2
15	(Italy) S Bolelli (Italy) F Fognini	7^{7}	6
10	(United Kingdom) J Murray (Brazil) B Soares	6^{2}	6^{6}
(Monaco) H Nys (Poland) J Zieliński	7^{7}	7^{8}
(Uruguay) A Behar (Ecuador) G Escobar	1	7^{7}	7^{10}
7	(Croatia) I Dodig (United States) A Krajicek	6	6^{5}	6^{5}

Third round
1	(United States) R Ram (United Kingdom) J Salisbury	6	7
15	(Italy) S Bolelli (Italy) F Fognini	1	5
(Monaco) H Nys (Poland) J Zieliński	6	6
(Uruguay) A Behar (Ecuador) G Escobar	1	4

Quarterfinals
1	(United States) R Ram (United Kingdom) J Salisbury	6	6^{3}	6
(Monaco) H Nys (Poland) J Zieliński	4	7^{7}	4

==== Section 2 ====
First round
4	(Germany) T Pütz (New Zealand) M Venus	6^{4}	6	6
(Kazakhstan) A Golubev (Spain) P Martínez	7^{7}	2	4
(Portugal) N Borges (Portugal) F Cabral	6	6
(Colombia) N Barrientos (Mexico) MÁ Reyes-Varela	4	2
(Ecuador) D Hidalgo (France) F Reboul	3	7^{7}	7^{10}
(Brazil) R Matos (Spain) D Vega Hernández	6	6^{4}	6^{7}
WC	(United States) S Gorzny (United States) A Michelsen	5	2
13	(Colombia) JS Cabal (Colombia) R Farah	7	6
11	(United Kingdom) L Glasspool (Finland) H Heliövaara	6	6
(United States) W Blumberg (Serbia) M Kecmanović	3	3
(Bosnia and Herzegovina) T Brkić (Argentina) M González	7^{7}	6^{3}	1
(South Africa) R Klaasen (Brazil) M Melo	6^{4}	7^{7}	6
PR	(Japan) B McLachlan (Croatia) F Škugor	7^{8}	3	6^{7}
(Sweden) A Göransson (Japan) Y Nishioka	6^{6}	6	7^{10}
(France) H Gaston (Italy) L Musetti	6	3	4
8	(Australia) T Kokkinakis (Australia) N Kyrgios	4	6	6

Second round
4	(Germany) T Pütz (New Zealand) M Venus	6	7^{7}
(Portugal) N Borges (Portugal) F Cabral	4	6^{3}
(Ecuador) D Hidalgo (France) F Reboul	6^{2}	7^{7}	6^{7}
13	(Colombia) JS Cabal (Colombia) R Farah	7^{7}	6^{5}	7^{10}
11	(United Kingdom) L Glasspool (Finland) H Heliövaara	6	7^{8}
(South Africa) R Klaasen (Brazil) M Melo	4	6^{6}
(Sweden) A Göransson (Japan) Y Nishioka	4	6^{3}
8	(Australia) T Kokkinakis (Australia) N Kyrgios	6	7^{7}

Third round
4	(Germany) T Pütz (New Zealand) M Venus	7^{7}	4	3
13	(Colombia) JS Cabal (Colombia) R Farah	6^{2}	6	6
11	(United Kingdom) L Glasspool (Finland) H Heliövaara	3	7^{8}	7^{10}
8	(Australia) T Kokkinakis (Australia) N Kyrgios	6	6^{6}	6^{8}

Quarterfinals
13	(Colombia) JS Cabal (Colombia) R Farah	7^{7}	6
11	(United Kingdom) L Glasspool (Finland) H Heliövaara	6^{5}	2

=== Bottom half ===
==== Section 3 ====
First round
6	(Croatia) N Mektić (Croatia) M Pavić	6	6
WC	(United States) B Holt (United States) G Nanda	3	4
WC	(United States) N Godsick (United States) E Quinn	7^{7}	6
(Georgia (country)) N Basilashvili (Mexico) H Hach Verdugo	6^{1}	4
I Ivashka (South Korea) S-w Kwon	4	5
(Netherlands) R Haase (Austria) P Oswald	6	7
(United States) M Giron (United States) M McDonald	3	6^{5}
12	(Germany) K Krawietz (Germany) A Mies	6	7^{7}
16	(France) N Mahut (France) É Roger-Vasselin	1	6	3
(France) Q Halys (France) A Mannarino	6	3	6
(Kazakhstan) A Bublik (Denmark) H Rune	6	3	6
(United States) D Kudla (United States) F Tiafoe	2	6	1
(Argentina) S Báez (Argentina) TM Etcheverry	1	5
(Kazakhstan) A Nedovyesov (Pakistan) A-u-H Qureshi	6	7
(Australia) J Peers (Australia) A Popyrin	3	6^{2}
3	(El Salvador) M Arévalo (Netherlands) J-J Rojer	6	7^{7}

Second round
6	(Croatia) N Mektić (Croatia) M Pavić	6	6
WC	(United States) N Godsick (United States) E Quinn	1	3
(Netherlands) R Haase (Austria) P Oswald	7^{7}	6^{4}	6
12	(Germany) K Krawietz (Germany) A Mies	6^{4}	7^{7}	3
(France) Q Halys (France) A Mannarino	6	5	7^{10}
(Kazakhstan) A Bublik (Denmark) H Rune	3	7	6^{8}
(Kazakhstan) A Nedovyesov (Pakistan) A-u-H Qureshi	0	3
3	(El Salvador) M Arévalo (Netherlands) J-J Rojer	6	6

Third round
6	(Croatia) N Mektić (Croatia) M Pavić	6	6
(Netherlands) R Haase (Austria) P Oswald	3	4
(France) Q Halys (France) A Mannarino	4	6^{9}
3	(El Salvador) M Arévalo (Netherlands) J-J Rojer	6	7^{11}

Quarterfinals
6	(Croatia) N Mektić (Croatia) M Pavić	3	4
3	(El Salvador) M Arévalo (Netherlands) J-J Rojer	6	6

==== Section 4 ====
First round
5	(Spain) M Granollers (Argentina) H Zeballos	6	6^{3}	6^{4}
PR	(Brazil) M Demoliner (Portugal) J Sousa	3	7^{7}	7^{10}
(Spain) F López (Spain) J Munar	6	6
(France) B Bonzi (France) A Rinderknech	2	4
WC	(United States) C Eubanks (United States) B Shelton	3	7^{10}	6
Alt	(Greece) Pe Tsitsipas (Greece) S Tsitsipas	6	6^{8}	2
(Italy) L Sonego (Italy) A Vavassori	7^{7}	6
9	(India) R Bopanna (Netherlands) M Middelkoop	6^{2}	2
14	(Mexico) S González (Argentina) A Molteni	6^{7}	7^{10}	1
(Australia) M Ebden (Australia) M Purcell	7^{9}	6^{8}	6
WC	(United States) R Galloway (United States) A Lawson	6	6
PR	(Slovenia) A Bedene (Finland) E Ruusuvuori	3	3
(United States) N Lammons (United States) J Withrow	6	6
(Czech Republic) J Lehečka (Czech Republic) J Veselý	4	4
(United States) S Johnson (United States) S Querrey	4	6^{5}
2	(Netherlands) W Koolhof (United Kingdom) N Skupski	6	7^{7}

Second round
PR	(Brazil) M Demoliner (Portugal) J Sousa	6	6
(Spain) F López (Spain) J Munar	3	4
WC	(United States) C Eubanks (United States) B Shelton	3	7^{7}	4
(Italy) L Sonego (Italy) A Vavassori	6	6^{5}	6
(Australia) M Ebden (Australia) M Purcell	6	6
WC	(United States) R Galloway (United States) A Lawson	2	2
(United States) N Lammons (United States) J Withrow	3	7^{7}	4
2	(Netherlands) W Koolhof (United Kingdom) N Skupski	6	6^{5}	6

Third round
PR	(Brazil) M Demoliner (Portugal) J Sousa	7^{7}	6
(Italy) L Sonego (Italy) A Vavassori	6^{4}	4
(Australia) M Ebden (Australia) M Purcell	6^{5}	6	3
2	(Netherlands) W Koolhof (United Kingdom) N Skupski	7^{7}	3	6

Quarterfinals
PR	(Brazil) M Demoliner (Portugal) J Sousa	3	1
2	(Netherlands) W Koolhof (United Kingdom) N Skupski	6	6

== Other entry information ==
=== Wild cards ===
- (United States) Sebastian Gorzny / (United States) Alex Michelsen
- (United States) Christopher Eubanks / (United States) Ben Shelton
- (United States) Robert Galloway / (United States) Alex Lawson
- (United States) Nicholas Godsick / (United States) Ethan Quinn
- (United States) Brandon Holt / (United States) Govind Nanda
- (United States) Nicholas Monroe / (United States) Keegan Smith
- (United States) Hunter Reese / (United States) Max Schnur

=== Protected ranking ===
- (Slovenia) Aljaž Bedene / (Finland) Emil Ruusuvuori
- (Brazil) Marcelo Demoliner / (Portugal) João Sousa
- (Belgium) Sander Gillé / (Poland) Łukasz Kubot
- (Japan) Ben McLachlan / (Croatia) Franko Škugor

=== Alternates ===
- (Germany) Daniel Altmaier / (Brazil) Thiago Monteiro
- (Greece) Petros Tsitsipas / (Greece) Stefanos Tsitsipas

=== Withdrawals ===
Before the tournament

- (Argentina) Pedro Cachin / (Argentina) Francisco Cerúndolo → replaced by (Greece) Petros Tsitsipas / (Greece) Stefanos Tsitsipas
- (Spain) Roberto Carballés Baena / (Spain) Pablo Carreño Busta → replaced by (Argentina) Federico Coria / (Colombia) Cristian Rodríguez
- (France) Sadio Doumbia / (France) Fabien Reboul → replaced by (Ecuador) Diego Hidalgo / (France) Fabien Reboul
- (United States) Tommy Paul / (United States) Jack Sock → replaced by (Germany) Daniel Altmaier / (Brazil) Thiago Monteiro
- (Argentina) Diego Schwartzman / (Argentina) Camilo Ugo Carabelli → replaced by (Georgia (country)) Nikoloz Basilashvili / (Mexico) Hans Hach Verdugo

== See also ==
- 2022 US Open – Day-by-day summaries
