= 2025 Challenger La Manche – Doubles =

Doubles
- 2025 Challenger La Manche

Final
- Champions: (Ukraine) Oleg Prihodko (Ukraine) Vitaliy Sachko
- Runners-up: (Slovakia) Lukáš Pokorný (Italy) Giorgio Ricca
- Score: 6–2, 6–2

Events
| Singles | Doubles |
- Challenger La Manche

George Goldhoff and James Trotter were the defending champions but chose not to defend their title.

Oleg Prihodko and Vitaliy Sachko won the title after defeating Lukáš Pokorný and Giorgio Ricca 6–2, 6–2 in the final.

== Seeds ==
1. (Monaco) Romain Arneodo / (Germany) Andreas Mies (first round)
2. (Switzerland) Jakub Paul / (Netherlands) David Pel (semifinals)
3. (France) Dan Added / (France) Albano Olivetti (semifinals)
4. (India) Vijay Sundar Prashanth / (Poland) Szymon Walków (quarterfinals)

== Draw ==
Key

- Q = Qualifier
- WC = Wild card
- LL = Lucky loser
- Alt = Alternate
- ITF = ITF entry
- PR = Protected ranking
- SR = Special ranking
- SE = Special exempt
- JE = Junior exempt
- JR = Junior Accelerator Programme entrant
- CO = College Accelerator Programme entrant
- NG = Next Gen Accelerator Program entrant
- w/o = Walkover
- r = Retired
- d = Defaulted

=== Draw ===
First round
1 | (Monaco) R Arneodo (Germany) A Mies | 4 | 3
(France) C Chidekh (France) L Sanchez | 6 | 6
(Czech Republic) Jiří Barnat (Czech Republic) F Duda | 3 | 4
(Ukraine) O Prihodko (Ukraine) V Sachko | 6 | 6
3 | (France) D Added (France) A Olivetti | 6 | 6
WC | (France) Maxence Beaugé (France) L Poullain | 2 | 1
(South Africa) P Henning (South Africa) Kris van Wyk | 2 | 4
(Finland) P Niklas-Salminen (Finland) E Ruusuvuori | 6 | 6
(Slovakia) L Pokorný (Italy) G Ricca | 7^{7} | 6
WC | (France) K de Schepper (France) Cyril Vandermeersch | 6^{5} | 3
(Norway) V Durasovic (Norway) L Hellum Lilleengen | 2 | 2
4 | (India) VS Prashanth (Poland) S Walków | 6 | 6
(United Kingdom) Liam Hignett (United Kingdom) J MacKinlay | 4 | 6 | [10]
(United Kingdom) S Duncan (United Kingdom) M Willis | 6 | 1 | [1]
E Gerasimov (Japan) Y Shimizu | 1 | 2
2 | (Switzerland) J Paul (Netherlands) D Pel | 6 | 6

Quarterfinals
(France) C Chidekh (France) L Sanchez | 3 | 5
(Ukraine) O Prihodko (Ukraine) V Sachko | 6 | 7
3 | (France) D Added (France) A Olivetti | 7^{7} | 6
(Finland) P Niklas-Salminen (Finland) E Ruusuvuori | 6^{3} | 4
(Slovakia) L Pokorný (Italy) G Ricca | 6 | 7^{13}
4 | (India) VS Prashanth (Poland) S Walków | 4 | 6^{11}
(United Kingdom) L Hignett (United Kingdom) J MacKinlay | 2 | 4
2 | (Switzerland) J Paul (Netherlands) D Pel | 6 | 6

Semifinals
(Ukraine) O Prihodko (Ukraine) V Sachko | 6 | 6
3 | (France) D Added (France) A Olivetti | 2 | 2
(Slovakia) L Pokorný (Italy) G Ricca | 5 | 6 | [11]
2 | (Switzerland) J Paul (Netherlands) D Pel | 7 | 4 | [9]

Final
(Ukraine) O Prihodko (Ukraine) V Sachko | 6 | 6
(Slovakia) L Pokorný (Italy) G Ricca | 2 | 2
