= Nicholas Godsick =

American tennis player (born 2004)

Nico Godsick
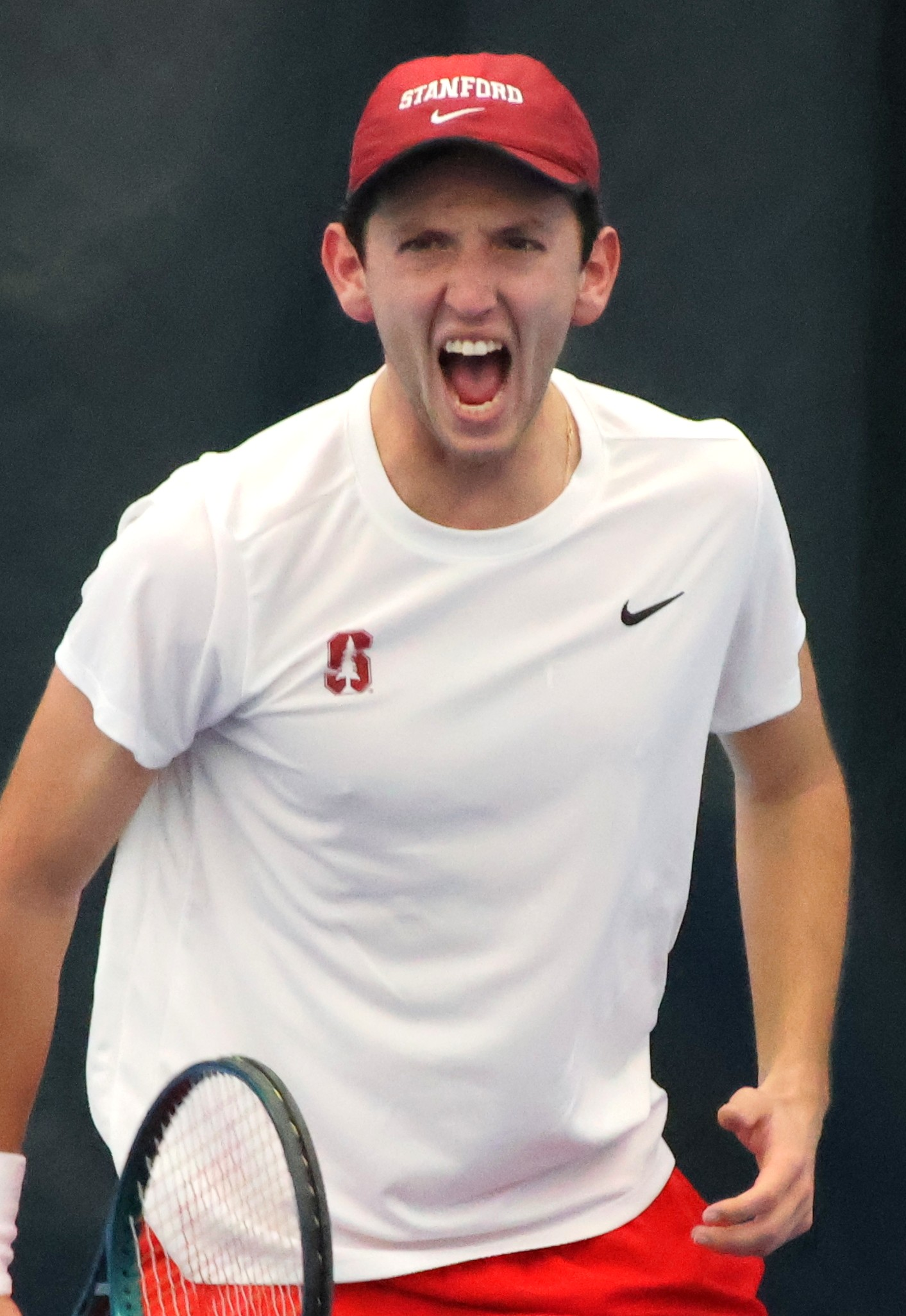
- Godsick with Stanford in 2026
- Full name: Nicholas Godsick
- Country (sports): United States
- Residence: Delray Beach, Florida
- Born: September 15, 2004 (age 22) Hunting Valley, Ohio
- Height: 1.88 m (6 ft 2 in)
- Plays: Right-handed (two-handed backhand)
- College: Stanford
- Coach: Diego Moyano (personal Coach); Paul Goldstein (college coach)
- Prize money: US $42,343

Singles
- Career record: 0–0
- Career titles: 0
- Highest ranking: No. 1,193 (February 5, 2024)
- Current ranking: No. 1,629 (September 14, 2026)

Grand Slam singles results
- French Open Junior: 1R (2022)
- Wimbledon Junior: 1R (2022)

Doubles
- Career record: 1–3
- Career titles: 0
- Highest ranking: No. 459 (October 3, 2022)
- Current ranking: No. 979 (September 14, 2026)

Grand Slam doubles results
- US Open: 2R (2022)
- French Open Junior: SF (2022)
- Wimbledon Junior: 2R (2022)
- US Open Junior: SF (2021)
- Last updated on: September 16, 2026.

Nicholas Godsick (born 15 September 2004) is an American tennis player. Godsick has a career-high ATP doubles ranking of No. 459 achieved on October 3, 2022 and a singles ranking of No. 1,193 achieved on 5 February 2024.

== Personal life ==
He is the son of former tennis professional Mary Joe Fernández and her husband, sports agent Tony Godsick. His father started representing Roger Federer before Nicholas was one year old and the families have been close. Nicholas has said he personally views Federer as a friend and a mentor. When practicing with Nick Kyrgios ahead of the 2022 Wimbledon Championships, Godsick noted a change in the Australian's demeanour and focus and predicted success for Kyrgios, who would go on to make it to the final. On being told this story on ESPN commentary, Cliff Drysdale responded "ok so Nico is a genius".

== Career ==
Godsick won the doubles at the 2022 USTA Boys 18s National Championship with his partner Ethan Quinn which earned them a wildcard into the main draw of the 2022 US Open. The young pairing beat Nikoloz Basilashvili and Hans Hach Verdugo in first round, before then losing their round two match against the sixth-seeded team of Nikola Mektic and Mate Pavic of Croatia.

Whilst at Stanford University, Godsick played doubles alongside Jagger Leach, whose mother Lindsay Davenport formed a professional doubles partnership with his mother.
