= 2026 Bengaluru Open II – Singles =

Singles
- 2026 Bengaluru Open II

Final
- Champion: (United States) Keegan Smith
- Runner-up: (Australia) Philip Sekulic
- Score: 6–2, 7–5

Events
Singles	Doubles
- Bengaluru Open

Pedro Martínez was the defending champion but chose not to defend his title.

Keegan Smith won the title after defeating Philip Sekulic 6–2, 7–5 in the final.

== Seeds ==
1. (United States) Keegan Smith (champion)
2. (United Kingdom) Hamish Stewart (quarterfinals)
3. Petr Bar Biryukov (first round)
4. (Australia) Philip Sekulic (final)
5. (Serbia) Ognjen Milić (quarterfinals)
6. (India) Karan Singh (first round)
7. (Thailand) Maximus Jones (quarterfinals)
8. (Mexico) Alex Hernández (first round)

== Draw ==
Key

- Q = Qualifier
- WC = Wild card
- LL = Lucky loser
- Alt = Alternate
- ITF = ITF entry
- PR = Protected ranking
- SR = Special ranking
- SE = Special exempt
- JE = Junior exempt
- JR = Junior Accelerator Programme entrant
- CO = College Accelerator Programme entrant
- NG = Next Gen Accelerator Program entrant
- w/o = Walkover
- r = Retired
- d = Defaulted

=== Finals ===
Semifinals
1	(United States) Keegan Smith	6	6
Ilya Ivashka	4	4
4	(Australia) Philip Sekulic	6	6
WC	(India) Kriish Tyagi	0	2

Final
1	(United States) Keegan Smith	6	7
4	(Australia) Philip Sekulic	2	5

=== Top half ===
First round
1	(United States) K Smith	6	6
Q	(Japan) Ryotaro Taguchi	1	4
(Czech Republic) D Palán	7^{12}	6
WC	(India) Maan Kesharwani	6^{10}	4
(India) SDP Dev	1	4
(Australia) J Charlton	6	6
WC	(India) Dev Javia	1	6^{5}
5	(Serbia) O Milić	6	7^{7}
3	P Bar Biryukov	7^{7}	4	6^{3}
Q	(United Kingdom) A Gray	6^{5}	6	7^{7}
Q	(United States) Ronit Karki	4	6^{7}
(India) Manish Sureshkumar	6	7^{9}
I Ivashka	6	6
(Chinese Taipei) K-y Lee	2	0
(Japan) K Isomura	7^{8}	6
6	(India) K Singh	6^{6}	3

Second round
1	(United States) K Smith	4	6	6
(Czech Republic) D Palán	6	3	4
(Australia) J Charlton	6	4	3
5	(Serbia) O Milić	3	6	6
Q	(United Kingdom) A Gray	4	2^{r}
(India) M Sureshkumar	6	3
I Ivashka	6	6
(Japan) K Isomura	1	2

Quarterfinals
1	(United States) K Smith	7^{7}	6
5	(Serbia) O Milić	6^{5}	3
(India) M Sureshkumar	3	3
I Ivashka	6	6

Semifinals
1	(United States) K Smith	6	6
I Ivashka	4	4

=== Bottom half ===
First round
7	(Thailand) M Jones	6	7^{7}
(India) Sidharth Rawat	4	6^{3}
(Israel) Amit Vales	6	6
Q	(India) Aditya Vishal Balsekar	2	2
(Japan) Ryuki Matsuda	6^{5}	6	2
Q	(United States) C Papa	7^{7}	3	6
(India) Digvijaypratap Singh	6^{5}	6^{5}
4	(Australia) P Sekulic	7^{7}	7^{7}
8	(Mexico) A Hernández	3	6	4
(Japan) Yuta Kawahashi	6	3	6
WC	(India) Kriish Tyagi	6	7
Q	(Japan) Taiyo Yamanaka	2	5
(Malaysia) Mitsuki Wei Kang Leong	3	6^{1}
(India) M Sasikumar	6	7^{7}
(Australia) O Jasika	4	7^{7}	3
2	(United Kingdom) H Stewart	6	6^{5}	6

Second round
7	(Thailand) M Jones	6	6^{5}	6
(Israel) A Vales	2	7^{7}	4
Q	(United States) C Papa	2	3
4	(Australia) P Sekulic	6	6
(Japan) Y Kawahashi	4	4
WC	(India) K Tyagi	6	6
(India) M Sasikumar	4	4
2	(United Kingdom) H Stewart	6	6

Quarterfinals
7	(Thailand) M Jones	7^{8}	3	1
4	(Australia) P Sekulic	6^{6}	6	6
WC	(India) K Tyagi	7^{9}	5	6
2	(United Kingdom) H Stewart	6^{7}	7	4

Semifinals
4	(Australia) P Sekulic	6	6
WC	(India) K Tyagi	0	2
