= Pereira Challenger =

- 2022 Pereira Challenger

ATP Challenger Tour
- Event name: Pereira Challenger
- Location: Pereira, Colombia
- Category: ATP Challenger Tour
- Surface: Clay

The Pereira Challenger is a professional tennis tournament played on clay courts. It is currently part of the Association of Tennis Professionals (ATP) Challenger Tour. It is held annually in Pereira, Colombia since 2022 as part of the Legión Sudamericana.

== Past finals ==
=== Singles ===
Year	Champion	Runner-up	Score
2022	(Argentina) Facundo Bagnis	(Argentina) Facundo Mena	6–3, 6–0

=== Doubles ===
Year	Champions	Runners-up	Score
2022	(Venezuela) Luis David Martínez (Colombia) Cristian Rodríguez	(Kazakhstan) Grigoriy Lomakin (Ukraine) Oleg Prihodko	7–6^{(7–2)}, 7–6^{(7–3)}
