= 2026 Bengaluru Open II – Doubles =

Doubles
- 2026 Bengaluru Open II

Final
- Champions: (India) Niki Kaliyanda Poonacha (India) Saketh Myneni
- Runners-up: Petr Bar Biryukov (Kazakhstan) Grigoriy Lomakin
- Score: 6–2, 6–3

Events
Singles	Doubles
- Bengaluru Open

Nicolás Barrientos and Benjamin Kittay were the defending champions but chose not to defend their title.

Niki Kaliyanda Poonacha and Saketh Myneni won the title after defeating Petr Bar Biryukov and Grigoriy Lomakin 6–2, 6–3 in the final.

== Seeds ==
1. (India) S D Prajwal Dev / (India) Nitin Kumar Sinha (semifinals)
2. (Republic of Ireland) Charles Barry / (Australia) Joshua Charlton (first round)
3. Sergey Betov / (India) Jeevan Nedunchezhiyan (quarterfinals)
4. (Japan) Kokoro Isomura / (Japan) Ryuki Matsuda (first round)

== Draw ==
Key

- Q = Qualifier
- WC = Wild card
- LL = Lucky loser
- Alt = Alternate
- ITF = ITF entry
- PR = Protected ranking
- SR = Special ranking
- SE = Special exempt
- JE = Junior exempt
- JR = Junior Accelerator Programme entrant
- CO = College Accelerator Programme entrant
- NG = Next Gen Accelerator Program entrant
- w/o = Walkover
- r = Retired
- d = Defaulted

First round
1	(India) SDP Dev (India) Nitin Kumar Sinha	3	7^{7}	[10]
(Japan) Tomohiro Masabayashi (Japan) Leo Vithoontien	6	6^{5}	[7]
WC	(India) Kabir Hans (India) Maan Kesharwani	5	4
(Chinese Taipei) J Hsu (United States) C Papa	7	6
4	(Japan) K Isomura (Japan) Ryuki Matsuda	4	1
(India) N Kaliyanda Poonacha (India) S Myneni	6	6
(Philippines) FC Alcantara (Thailand) M Jones	3	2
WC	(India) Sidharth Rawat (India) Manish Sureshkumar	6	6
(Australia) M Bouzige (Australia) O Jasika	6^{5}	3
P Bar Biryukov (Kazakhstan) G Lomakin	7^{7}	6
(India) Sai Karteek Reddy Ganta (Japan) Yamato Sueoka	5	5
3	S Betov (India) J Nedunchezhiyan	7	7
Alt	(Chinese Taipei) K-y Lee (Malaysia) Mitsuki Wei Kang Leong	2	6	[8]
(India) A Kalyanpur (India) M Sasikumar	6	0	[10]
(Czech Republic) D Palán (India) Digvijaypratap Singh	6	6
2	(Republic of Ireland) C Barry (Australia) J Charlton	4	4

Quarterfinals
1	(India) SDP Dev (India) NK Sinha	6	7
(Chinese Taipei) J Hsu (United States) C Papa	4	5
(India) N Kaliyanda Poonacha (India) S Myneni	6	7^{7}
WC	(India) S Rawat (India) M Sureshkumar	3	6^{3}
P Bar Biryukov (Kazakhstan) G Lomakin	4	7	[10]
3	S Betov (India) J Nedunchezhiyan	6	5	[8]
(India) A Kalyanpur (India) M Sasikumar	7^{7}	6
(Czech Republic) D Palán (India) D Singh	6^{5}	3

Semifinals
1	(India) SDP Dev (India) NK Sinha	5	1
(India) N Kaliyanda Poonacha (India) S Myneni	7	6
P Bar Biryukov (Kazakhstan) G Lomakin	7^{7}	7^{7}
(India) A Kalyanpur (India) M Sasikumar	6^{4}	6^{4}

Final
(India) N Kaliyanda Poonacha (India) S Myneni	6	6
P Bar Biryukov (Kazakhstan) G Lomakin	2	3
