= Keegan Smith (tennis) =

American tennis player (born 1998)

- Smith at the 2026 Wimbledon Championships
- Country (sports): United States
- Residence: San Diego, United States
- Born: June 23, 1998 (age 28) Wilmington, United States
- Height: 6 ft 7 in (2.01 m)
- Turned pro: 2021
- Plays: Right-handed (two-handed backhand)
- College: UCLA
- Prize money: US $306,692

Singles
- Career record: 0–0 (at ATP Tour level, Grand Slam level, and in Davis Cup)
- Career titles: 1 ATP Challenger
- Highest ranking: No. 185 (October 26, 2026)
- Current ranking: No. 185 (October 26, 2026)

Grand Slam singles results
- Wimbledon: Q2 (2026)
- US Open: Q1 (2026)

Doubles
- Career record: 1–4 (at ATP Tour level, Grand Slam level, and in Davis Cup)
- Career titles: 0
- Highest ranking: No. 261 (October 3, 2022)
- Current ranking: No. 276 (October 26, 2026)

Grand Slam doubles results
- US Open: 2R (2022)
- Last updated on: October 26, 2026.

Keegan Smith (born June 23, 1998) is an American tennis player. Smith has a career high ATP singles ranking of No. 185 achieved on October 26, 2026 and a career high ATP doubles ranking of No. 261 achieved on October 3, 2022.

Smith made his ATP main draw debut at the 2019 Hall of Fame Open after receiving a wildcard for the doubles main draw. He also played the U.S. Open main draw doubles in 2019 and in 2022.

Smith played college tennis at UCLA, where he and Maxime Cressy won the 2019 NCAA Men's Tennis Championship doubles tournament.

He won his first ATP Challenger title at the 2026 Bengaluru Open II, defeating Philip Sekulic in the final.

== ATP Challenger and ITF World Tennis Tour finals ==
=== Singles: 10 (7–4) ===
Legend (singles) ATP Challenger Tour (1–1) ITF WTT (6–3)	Finals by surface Hard (6–3) Clay (1–1) Grass (0–0) Carpet (0–0)

Result	W–L	Date	Tournament	Tier	Surface	Opponent	Score
Win	1–0	May 2026	Bengaluru Open II, India	Challenger	Hard	(Australia) Philip Sekulic	6–2, 7–5
Loss	1–1	Jun 2026	Ion Țiriac Challenger, Romania	Challenger	Clay	(Hungary) Zsombor Piros	4–6, 4–6
Win	1–0	Sep 2021	M15 Lubbock, US	WTT	Hard	(United States) Cannon Kingsley	7–5, 6–2
Win	2–0	Feb 2022	M25 Cancún, Mexico	WTT	Hard	(Germany) Lucas Gerch	6–4, 6–1
Loss	2–1	Mar 2022	M25 Bakersfield, US	WTT	Hard	(Australia) Rinky Hijikata	1–6, 5–7
Win	3–1	May 2025	M15 San Diego, US	WTT	Hard	Savriyan Danilov	6–2, 6–3
Loss	3–2	Jul 2025	M15 San Diego, US	WTT	Hard	(Australia) Dane Sweeny	6–1, 3–6, 2–6
Loss	3–3	Sep 2025	M15 Fayetteville, US	WTT	Hard	(Mexico) Luis Carlos Álvarez	3–6, 6–4, 3–6
Win	4–3	Nov 2025	M15 Tallahassee, US	WTT	Clay	(United States) Ryan Fishback	6–3, 6–3
Win	5–3	Dec 2025	M15 Tauranga, New Zealand	WTT	Hard	(United States) Christian Langmo	6–3, 6–2
Win	6–3	Jan 2026	M25 Winston-Salem, US	WTT	Hard (i)	(Japan) Shunsuke Mitsui	7–6^{(7–5)}, 6–7^{(4–7)}, 6–3
