= Cristian Rodríguez (tennis) =

Colombian tennis player (born 1990)

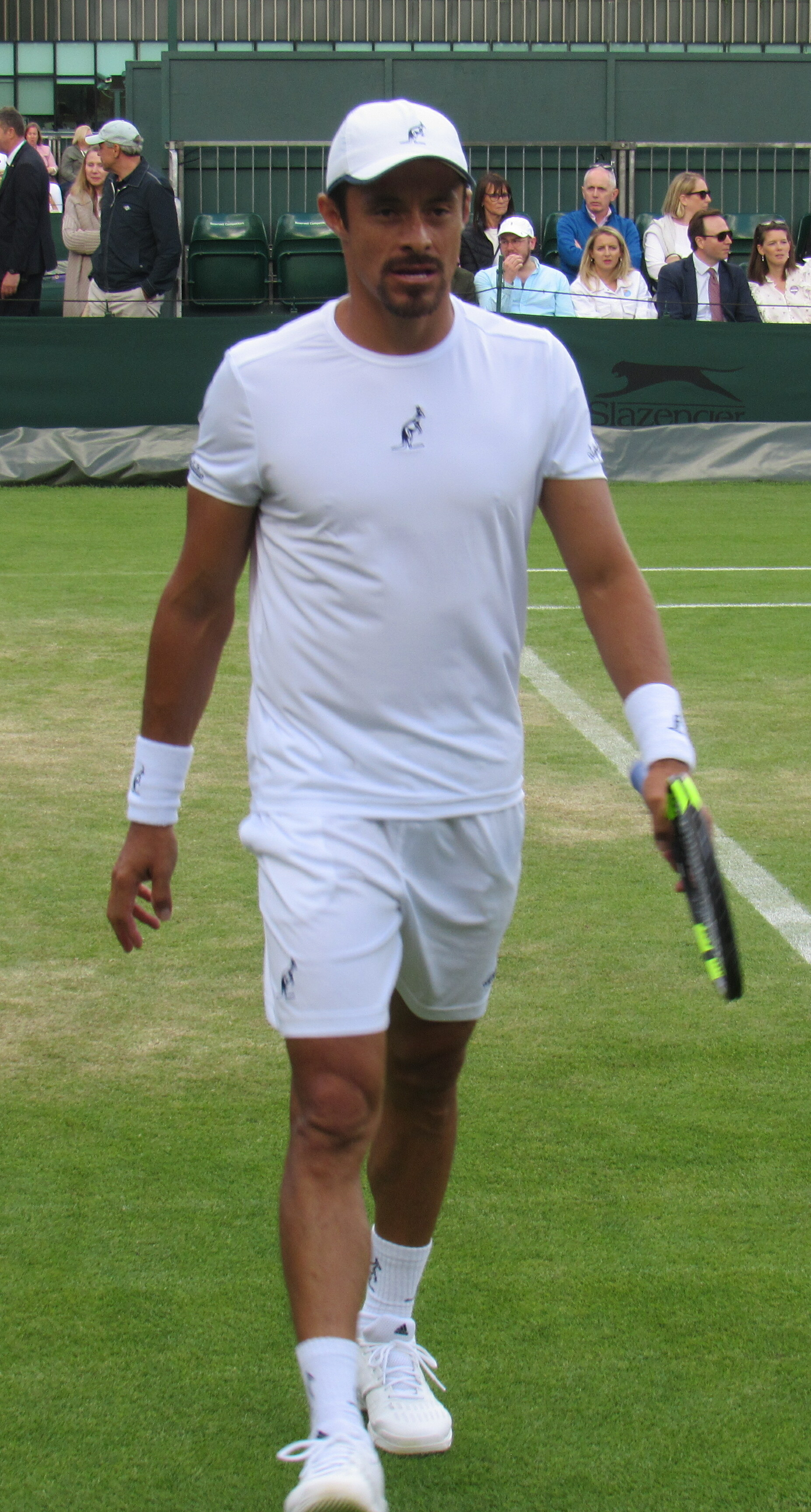
- Cristian Rodríguez in Wimbledon 2022
- Country (sports): Colombia
- Residence: Rome, Italy
- Born: 24 June 1990 (age 36) Bogotá, Colombia
- Height: 1.80 m (5 ft 11 in)
- Plays: Right Handed (Double Handed Backhand)
- Prize money: $ 343,841

Singles
- Career record: 1–0
- Career titles: 0
- Highest ranking: No. 362 (9 April 2018)

Doubles
- Career record: 13–29
- Career titles: 0
- Highest ranking: No. 69 (4 March 2024)
- Current ranking: No. 165 (18 August 2025)

Grand Slam doubles results
- Australian Open: 1R (2023)
- French Open: 1R (2024)
- Wimbledon: 2R (2022)
- US Open: 1R (2022, 2024)
Medal record
Representing Colombia
Men's tennis
| Event | 1st | 2nd | 3rd |
|---|---|---|---|
| CAC Games | 1 | 1 | 1 |
| South American Games | 0 | 0 | 1 |
| Bolivarian Games | 0 | 1 | 1 |
| Total | 1 | 2 | 3 |
Central American and Caribbean Games
| Gold medal – first place | 2026 Santo Domingo | Mixed doubles |
| Silver medal – second place | 2026 Santo Domingo | Nations cup |
| Bronze medal – third place | 2026 Santo Domingo | Doubles |
South American Games
| Bronze medal – third place | 2018 Cochabamba | Doubles |
Bolivarian Games
| Silver medal – second place | 2017 Santa Marta | Team |
| Bronze medal – third place | 2017 Santa Marta | Individual |
- Last updated on: 19 August 2025.

Cristian Rodríguez (born 24 June 1990) is a Colombian tennis player who plays primarily on the ATP Challenger Tour and ITF Futures Tour. He reached a career-high ATP doubles ranking of world No. 69 on 4 March 2024 and a singles ranking of No. 362 on 9 April 2018. He has played for the Colombia Davis Cup team since 2018 with an overall record of 1–0, with the sole match coming in singles play.

Rodriguez has won three singles titles, all coming at the ITF Futures tour level, and he has won 32 doubles titles, with 14 at the ATP Challenger Tour level and 18 at the ITF level.

== Doubles performance timeline ==
Key
| W | F | SF | QF | #R | RR | Q# | DNQ | A | NH |

(W) winner; (F) finalist; (SF) semifinalist; (QF) quarterfinalist; (#R) rounds 4, 3, 2, 1; (RR) round-robin stage; (Q#) qualification round; (DNQ) did not qualify; (A) absent; (NH) not held; (SR) strike rate (events won / competed); (W–L) win–loss record.
To avoid confusion and double counting, these charts are updated at the conclusion of a tournament or when the player's participation has ended.

Current till 2022 Wimbledon Championships – Men's doubles.

| Tournament | 2022 | 2023 | 2024 | SR | W-L |
|---|---|---|---|---|---|
Grand Slam tournaments
| Australian Open | A | 1R | A | 0 / 1 | 0–1 |
| French Open | A | A | 1R | 0 / 1 | 0–1 |
| Wimbledon | 2R | A | 1R | 0 / 2 | 1–2 |
| US Open | 1R | A | 1R | 0 / 2 | 0–2 |
| Win–loss | 1–2 | 0–1 | 0–3 | 0 / 6 | 1–6 |
ATP Tour Masters 1000
| Indian Wells Masters | A | A | A | 0 / 0 | 0–0 |
| Miami Open | A | A | A | 0 / 0 | 0–0 |
| Monte-Carlo Masters | A | A | A | 0 / 0 | 0–0 |
| Madrid Open | A | A | A | 0 / 0 | 0–0 |
| Italian Open | A | A | 1R | 0 / 1 | 0–1 |
| Canadian Open | A | A | A | 0 / 0 | 0–0 |
| Cincinnati Masters | A | A | A | 0 / 0 | 0–0 |
| Shanghai Masters | A | A | | 0 / 0 | 0–0 |
| Paris Masters | A | A | | 0 / 0 | 0–0 |
Career statistics
| Titles–Finals | 0–0 | 0–0 | 0–1 | 0–0 | |
| Year-End Ranking | 82 | 81 | | 69 | |

== ATP Challenger and ITF Futures finals ==
=== Singles: 13 (4–9) ===
| Legend ATP Challenger (0–0) ITF Futures (4–9) | Finals by surface Hard (1–4) Clay (3–5) Grass (0–0) Carpet (0–0) |

| Result | W–L | Date | Tournament | Tier | Surface | Opponent | Score |
|---|---|---|---|---|---|---|---|
| Loss | 0–1 | May 2011 | Italy F8, Sanremo | Futures | Clay | (France) Jonathan Dasnieres De Veigy | 3–6, 1–6 |
| Loss | 0–2 | Sep 2012 | Italy F28, Pozzuoli | Futures | Hard | (Italy) Riccardo Bellotti | 7–6^{(10–8)}, 1–6, 5–7 |
| Loss | 0–3 | Sep 2013 | Egypt F23, Sharm El Sheikh | Futures | Clay | (Chile) Ricardo Urzua-Rivera | 4–6, 1–6 |
| Loss | 0–4 | Nov 2015 | Colombia F8, Bogotá | Futures | Clay | (Colombia) Daniel Elahi Galán | 3–6, 2–3 ret. |
| Win | 1–4 | Jun 2017 | Tunisia F21, Hammamet | Futures | Clay | (France) Elliot Benchetrit | 7–5, 6–4 |
| Win | 2–4 | Dec 2017 | Tunisia F48, Antalya | Futures | Clay | (Argentina) Dante Gennaro | 6–2, 6–2 |
| Loss | 2–5 | Aug 2018 | Romania F9, Pitești | Futures | Clay | (Argentina) Federico Coria | 5–7, 2–6 |
| Win | 3–5 | Sep 2019 | M15 Cancún, Mexico | World Tennis Tour | Hard | (United States) Gage Brymer | 6–4, 2–1 ret. |
| Loss | 3–6 | Sep 2019 | M15 Cancún, Mexico | World Tennis Tour | Hard | (United States) Adam El Mihdawy | 4–6, 7–6^{(7–2)}, 1–6 |
| Loss | 3–7 | Oct 2019 | M15 Cancún, Mexico | World Tennis Tour | Hard | (Mexico) Tigre Hank | 4–6, 7–6^{(7–4)}, 3–6 |
| Loss | 3–8 | Oct 2019 | M15 Cancún, Mexico | World Tennis Tour | Hard | (Argentina) Maximiliano Estévez | 3–5 ret. |
| Loss | 3–9 | Nov 2019 | M25 Naples, United States | World Tennis Tour | Clay | (Argentina) Genaro Alberto Olivieri | 5–7, 3–6 |
| Win | 4–9 | Aug 2021 | M25 Guayaquil, Ecuador | World Tennis Tour | Clay | (Brazil) Jose Pereira | 6–3, 7–6^{(7–3)} |

=== Doubles: 70 (34–36) ===
| Legend ATP Challenger (16–15) ITF Futures (18–21) | Finals by surface Hard (3–7) Clay (31–28) Grass (0–1) |

| Result | W–L | Date | Tournament | Tier | Surface | Partner | Opponents | Score |
|---|---|---|---|---|---|---|---|---|
| Loss | 0–1 | Aug 2010 | Italy F23, Piombino | Futures | Hard | (Italy) Enrico Fioravante | (Italy) Claudio Grassi (Montenegro) Daniel Danilović | 6–7^{(5–7)}, 4–6 |
| Win | 1–1 | Mar 2011 | Italy F2, Cividino | Futures | Hard | (Italy) Enrico Fioravante | (Italy) Luca Vanni (Italy) Enrico Iannuzzi | 6–4, 7–6^{(18–16)} |
| Win | 2–1 | Aug 2012 | Italy F20, La Spezia | Futures | Clay | (Colombia) Óscar Rodríguez | (Colombia) Alejandro González (Portugal) Pedro Sousa | 7–6^{(7–1)}, 6–4 |
| Win | 3–1 | Sep 2012 | Italy F27, Biella | Futures | Clay | (Italy) Enrico Fioravante | (Italy) Matteo Volante (Italy) Andrea Arnaboldi | 6–3, 6–2 |
| Loss | 3–2 | Sep 2012 | Italy F28, Pozzuoli | Futures | Hard | (Republic of Ireland) Sam Barry | (Italy) Matteo Volante (Italy) Enrico Fioravante | 4–6, 2–6 |
| Loss | 3–3 | Mar 2013 | Bahrain F1, Manama | Futures | Hard | (Spain) Jordi Samper Montaña | (Switzerland) Riccardo Maiga (South Africa) Ruan Roelofse | 3–6, 3–6 |
| Loss | 3–4 | Apr 2013 | Qatar F2, Doha | Futures | Hard | (Spain) Jordi Samper Montaña | (Switzerland) Riccardo Maiga (Belgium) Joris De Loore | 4–6, 3–6 |
| Loss | 3–5 | Jun 2013 | Italy F11, Parma | Futures | Clay | (Colombia) Óscar Rodríguez | (Chile) Guillermo Hormazábal (Argentina) Leandro Migani | 4–6, 7–6^{(9–7)}, [4–10] |
| Loss | 3–6 | Jun 2013 | Slovenia F3, Litija | Futures | Clay | (Italy) Erik Crepaldi | (Austria) Sebastian Bader (United States) Erik Elliott | 3–6, 3–6 |
| Win | 4–6 | Jul 2013 | Todi, Italy | Challenger | Clay | (Colombia) Santiago Giraldo | (Italy) Andrea Arnaboldi (Italy) Gianluca Naso | 4–6, 7–6^{(7–2)}, [10–3] |
| Win | 5–6 | Sep 2013 | Egypt F23, Sharm El Sheikh | Futures | Clay | (Chile) Ricardo Urzua-Rivera | (India) N. Sriram Balaji (India) Ranjeet Virali-Murugesan | 7–5, 6–1 |
| Win | 6–6 | Oct 2013 | Egypt F28, Sharm El Sheikh | Futures | Clay | (Tunisia) Skander Mansouri | (Turkey) Tuna Altuna (Russia) Ivan Nedelko | 6–3, 6–1 |
| Loss | 6–7 | Feb 2014 | Egypt F5, Sharm El Sheikh | Futures | Clay | (Italy) Filippo Leonardi | (Czech Republic) Lukas Marsoun (Czech Republic) Libor Salaba | 6–7^{(4–7)}, 6–4, [10–12] |
| Win | 7–7 | Mar 2014 | Egypt F7, Sharm El Sheikh | Futures | Clay | (Egypt) Karim-Mohamed Maamoun | (Brazil) Lucas M Guitarrari (Brazil) Alex Blumenberg | 6–3, 6–3 |
| Win | 8–7 | Nov 2015 | Colombia F8, Bogotá | Futures | Clay | (Colombia) Mateo Andres Ruiz Naranjo | (Colombia) Juan Sebastián Gómez (Argentina) Facundo Mena | 7–6^{(7–2)}, 6–3 |
| Loss | 8–8 | Feb 2016 | China F1, Anning | Futures | Clay | (France) Tak Khunn Wang | (China) Gao Xin (China) Bowen Ouyang | 5–7, 3–6 |
| Win | 9–8 | Mar 2016 | China F3, Anning | Futures | Clay | (China) Chuhan Wang | (China) Cui Jie (China) Te Rigele | 7–6^{(7–5)}, 6–2 |
| Win | 10–8 | Jun 2016 | Tunisia F21, Hammamet | Futures | Clay | (Italy) Walter Trusendi | (Spain) Roberto Ortega Olmedo (Egypt) Karim-Mohamed Maamoun | 6–3, 2–6, [10–7] |
| Loss | 10–9 | Jul 2016 | Colombia F3, Cali | Futures | Clay | (Colombia) Juan Sebastián Gómez | (Mexico) Luis Patino (Ecuador) Roberto Quiroz | 1–6, 6–3, [7–10] |
| Loss | 10–10 | Dec 2016 | Tunisia F36, Hammamet | Futures | Clay | (France) François-Arthur Vibert | (Italy) Marco Bortolotti (Italy) Francesco Salviato | 5–7, 5–7 |
| Loss | 10–11 | Feb 2017 | Tunisia F5, Hammamet | Futures | Clay | (Italy) Giulio Di Meo | (Portugal) Felipe Cunha Silva (Portugal) Joao Monteiro | 2–6, 6–7^{(4–7)} |
| Win | 11–11 | Feb 2017 | Tunisia F6, Hammamet | Futures | Clay | (Turkey) Anis Ghorbel | (Portugal) Felipe Cunha Silva (Brazil) Wilson Leite | 6–1, 6–2 |
| Loss | 11–12 | May 2017 | Tunisia F17, Hammamet | Futures | Clay | (Turkey) Anis Ghorbel | (Uruguay) Santiago Maresca (Brazil) David Pérez Sanz | 6–7^{(4–7)}, 7–5, [6–10] |
| Loss | 11–13 | May 2017 | Tunisia F18, Hammamet | Futures | Clay | (Turkey) Anis Ghorbel | (France) Yannick Jankovits (France) Jonathan Kanar | 3–6, 4–6 |
| Win | 12–13 | Jul 2017 | Romania F5, Curtea de Argeș | Futures | Clay | (Hungary) Péter Nagy | (Argentina) Adrian Barbu (Switzerland) Riccardo Maiga | 6–4, 7–6^{(8–6)} |
| Win | 13–13 | Dec 2017 | Turkey F47, Antalya | Futures | Clay | (France) Tak Khunn Wang | (Argentina) Dante Gennaro (Ecuador) Diego Hidalgo | 7–6^{(7–2)}, 6–2 |
| Win | 14–13 | Mar 2018 | Turkey F10, Antalya | Futures | Clay | (Italy) Antonio Massara | (Brazil) Rafael Matos (Brazil) Marcelo Zormann | 6–3, 7–6^{(7–3)} |
| Loss | 14–14 | Feb 2019 | M15 Antalya, Turkey | World Tennis Tour | Clay | (Colombia) Felipe Mantilla | (China) Runhao Hua (Hong Kong) Hong Kit Wong | 0–3 ret |
| Win | 15–14 | Mar 2019 | M15 Antalya, Turkey | World Tennis Tour | Clay | (Brazil) Felipe Meligeni Alves | (Kazakhstan) Grigoriy Lomakin (Ukraine) Vladyslav Orlov | 6–3, 6–4 |
| Loss | 15–15 | Jul 2019 | M15 Lima, Peru | World Tennis Tour | Clay | (Colombia) Jose Daniel Bendeck | (Brazil) Oscar Jose Gutierrez (Brazil) Rafael Matos | 6–7^{(5–7)}, 1–6 |
| Loss | 15–16 | Sep 2019 | M15 Cancún, Mexico | World Tennis Tour | Hard | (Colombia) Felipe Mantilla | (Colombia) Juan Sebastián Gómez (Peru) Jorge Brian Panta | 6–2, 4–6, [9–11] |
| Loss | 15–17 | Oct 2019 | M15 Cancún, Mexico | World Tennis Tour | Hard | (Colombia) Jose Daniel Bendeck | (Bolivia) Alejandro Mendoza (Bolivia) Federico Zeballos | 6–3, 3–6, [6–10] |
| Loss | 15–18 | Oct 2019 | M15 Cancún, Mexico | World Tennis Tour | Hard | (Colombia) Jose Daniel Bendeck | (Colombia) Juan Sebastián Gómez (Mexico) Luis Patiño | walkover |
| Win | 16–18 | Nov 2019 | M25 Naples, United States | World Tennis Tour | Clay | (Colombia) Jose Daniel Bendeck | (United States) Oliver Crawford (United States) Sam Riffice | 4–6, 6–2, [10–2] |
| Loss | 16–19 | Feb 2020 | M25 Naples, United States | World Tennis Tour | Clay | (Colombia) Nicolás Barrientos | (United States) Martin Damm (United States) Toby Kodat | 6–4, 4–6, [7–10] |
| Loss | 16–20 | Feb 2021 | M25 Naples, United States | World Tennis Tour | Clay | (Ecuador) Diego Hidalgo | (Colombia) Alejandro Gomez (United States) Junior Alexander Ore | 4–6, 6–7^{(7–9)} |
| Win | 17–20 | May 2021 | M15 Helsinki, Finland | World Tennis Tour | Clay | (Netherlands) Glenn Smits | (France) Titouan Droguet (France) Jonathan Eysseric | 7–6^{(7–9)}, 6–2 |
| Loss | 17–21 | Jul 2021 | M25 Wrocław, Poland | World Tennis Tour | Clay | (Italy) Marco Bortolotti | (Brazil) Oscar Jose Gutierrez (Brazil) Orlando Luz | 6–7^{(6–8)}, 6–2, [9–11] |
| Win | 18–21 | Jul 2021 | M25 Portoviejo, Ecuador | World Tennis Tour | Clay | (Mexico) Luis Patiño | (Peru) Arklon Huertas Del Pino (Venezuela) Ricardo Rodríguez-Pace | 6–3, 6–2 |
| Win | 19–21 | Aug 2021 | M25 Guayaquil, Ecuador | World Tennis Tour | Clay | (Ecuador) Diego Hidalgo | (Peru) Conner Huertas del Pino (Peru) Jorge Panta | 6–3, 6–7^{(7–9)}, [10–6] |
| Win | 20–21 | Aug 2021 | Barletta, Italy | Challenger | Clay | (Italy) Marco Bortolotti | (Netherlands) Gijs Brouwer (Netherlands) Jelle Sels | 6–2, 6–4 |
| Win | 21–21 | Sep 2021 | Ambato, Ecuador | Challenger | Clay | (Ecuador) Diego Hidalgo | (Colombia) Alejandro Gómez (Argentina) Thiago Agustín Tirante | 6–3, 4–6, [10–3] |
| Loss | 21–22 | Nov 2021 | Guayaquil, Ecuador | Challenger | Clay | (Ecuador) Diego Hidalgo | (Netherlands) Jesper de Jong (Netherlands) Bart Stevens | 5–7, 2–6 |
| Loss | 21–23 | Jan 2022 | Blumenau, Brazil | Challenger | Clay | (Ecuador) Diego Hidalgo | (Bolivia) Boris Arias (Bolivia) Federico Zeballos | 6–7^{(3–7)}, 1–6 |
| Win | 22–23 | Jan 2022 | Concepción, Chile | Challenger | Clay | (Ecuador) Diego Hidalgo | (Argentina) Francisco Cerúndolo (Argentina) Camilo Ugo Carabelli | 6–2, 6–0 |
| Win | 23–23 | Jan 2022 | Santa Cruz de la Sierra, Bolivia | Challenger | Clay | (Ecuador) Diego Hidalgo | (Slovakia) Andrej Martin (Austria) Tristan-Samuel Weissborn | 4–6, 6–3, [10–8] |
| Win | 24–23 | Mar 2022 | Santiago, Chile | Challenger | Clay | (Ecuador) Diego Hidalgo | (Argentina) Pedro Cachin (Argentina) Facundo Mena | 6–4, 6–4 |
| Loss | 24–24 | Mar 2022 | Concepción, Chile | Challenger | Clay | (Ecuador) Diego Hidalgo | (Argentina) Andrea Collarini (Argentina) Renzo Olivo | 4–6, 4–6 |
| Win | 25–24 | Mar 2022 | Pereira, Colombia | Challenger | Clay | (Venezuela) Luis David Martínez | (Kazakhstan) Grigoriy Lomakin (Ukraine) Oleg Prihodko | 7–6^{(7–2)}, 7–6^{(7–3)} |
| Loss | 25–25 | Apr 2022 | Tallahassee, USA | Challenger | Clay | (Ecuador) Diego Hidalgo | (Netherlands) Gijs Brouwer (United States) Christian Harrison | 6–4, 5–7, [6–10] |
| Win | 26–25 | May 2022 | Salvador, Brazil | Challenger | Clay | (Ecuador) Diego Hidalgo | (Brazil) Orlando Luz (Brazil) Felipe Meligeni Alves | 7–5, 6–1 |
| Loss | 26–26 | May 2022 | Coquimbo, Chile | Challenger | Clay | (Ecuador) Diego Hidalgo | (Argentina) Guillermo Durán (Colombia) Nicolás Mejía | 4–6, 6–1, [7–10] |
| Loss | 26–27 | Jun 2022 | Milan, Italy | Challenger | Clay | (Ecuador) Diego Hidalgo | (Italy) Luciano Darderi (Brazil) Fernando Romboli | 4–6, 6–2, [5–10] |
| Loss | 26–28 | Jul 2022 | Iași, Romania | Challenger | Clay | (Ecuador) Diego Hidalgo | (France) Geoffrey Blancaneaux (Argentina) Renzo Olivo | 4–6, 6–2, [6–10] |
| Win | 27–28 | Jul 2022 | Trieste, Italy | Challenger | Clay | (Ecuador) Diego Hidalgo | (Italy) Marco Bortolotti (Spain) Sergio Martos Gornés | 4–6, 6–3, [10–5] |
| Loss | 27–29 | Feb 2023 | Monterrey, Mexico | Challenger | Hard | (Venezuela) Luis David Martínez | (Sweden) André Göransson (Japan) Ben McLachlan | 3–6, 4–6 |
| Loss | 27–30 | Mar 2023 | Santiago, Chile | Challenger | Clay | (Ecuador) Diego Hidalgo | (Brazil) Pedro Boscardin Dias (Brazil) João Lucas Reis da Silva | 4–6, 6–3, [7–10] |
| Win | 28–30 | Mar 2023 | Viña del Mar, Chile | Challenger | Clay | (Ecuador) Diego Hidalgo | (Italy) Luciano Darderi (Italy) Andrea Vavassori | 6–4, 7–6^{(7–5)} |
| Win | 29–30 | Jun 2023 | Cali, Colombia | Challenger | Clay | (Argentina) Guido Andreozzi | (Brazil) Orlando Luz (Ukraine) Oleg Prihodko | 6–3, 6–4 |
| Loss | 29–31 | Jul 2023 | San Benedetto del Tronto, Italy | Challenger | Clay | (Ecuador) Diego Hidalgo | (Brazil) Fernando Romboli (Brazil) Marcelo Zormann | 3–6, 4–6 |
| Loss | 29–32 | Aug 2023 | Santo Domingo, Dominican Republic | Challenger | Clay | (Ecuador) Diego Hidalgo | (Brazil) Pedro Boscardin Dias (Brazil) Gustavo Heide | 4–6, 5–7 |
| Win | 30–32 | Aug 2023 | Stanford, United States | Challenger | Hard | (Ecuador) Diego Hidalgo | (United Kingdom) Julian Cash (United Kingdom) Henry Patten | 6–7^{(1–7)}, 6–4, [10–8] |
| Win | 31–32 | Oct 2023 | Buenos Aires, Argentina | Challenger | Clay | (Colombia) Diego Hidalgo | (Brazil) Fernando Romboli (Brazil) Marcelo Zormann | 6–3, 6–2 |
| Loss | 31–33 | May 2024 | Pays d'Aix, France | Challenger | Clay | (Ecuador) Diego Hidalgo | (United Kingdom) Luke Johnson (Tunisia) Skander Mansouri | 3–6, 3–6 |
| Win | 32–33 | Sep 2024 | Shanghai, China | Challenger | Hard | (Australia) Matthew Romios | (India) Rithvik Choudary Bollipalli (India) Arjun Kadhe | 7–6^{(7–4)}, 1–6, [10–7] |
| Loss | 32–34 | Jul 2025 | Newport, United States | Challenger | Grass | (Mexico) Hans Hach Verdugo | (United States) Robert Cash (United States) JJ Tracy | 6–7^{(3–7)}, 3–6 |
| Win | 33–34 | Aug 2025 | Barranquilla, Colombia | Challenger | Clay | (United States) Benjamin Kittay | (Morocco) Taha Baadi (Canada) Dan Martin | 6–2, 6–4 |
| Loss | 33–35 | Nov 2025 | Lima, Peru | Challenger | Clay | (Bolivia) Federico Zeballos | (Brazil) Marcelo Demoliner (Brazil) Orlando Luz | 6–2, 6–7^{(3–7)}, [8–10] |
| Win | 34–35 | Nov 2025 | Bogotá, Colombia | Challenger | Clay | (Venezuela) Luis David Martínez | (Colombia) Nicolás Barrientos (United States) Benjamin Kittay | 6–1, 6–4 |
| Loss | 34–36 | Apr 2026 | Savannah, United States | Challenger | Clay | (Venezuela) Luis David Martínez | (Canada) Cleeve Harper (United Kingdom) David Stevenson | 6–7^{(4–7).}, 2–6 |
