= Grigoriy Lomakin =

Kazakh tennis player

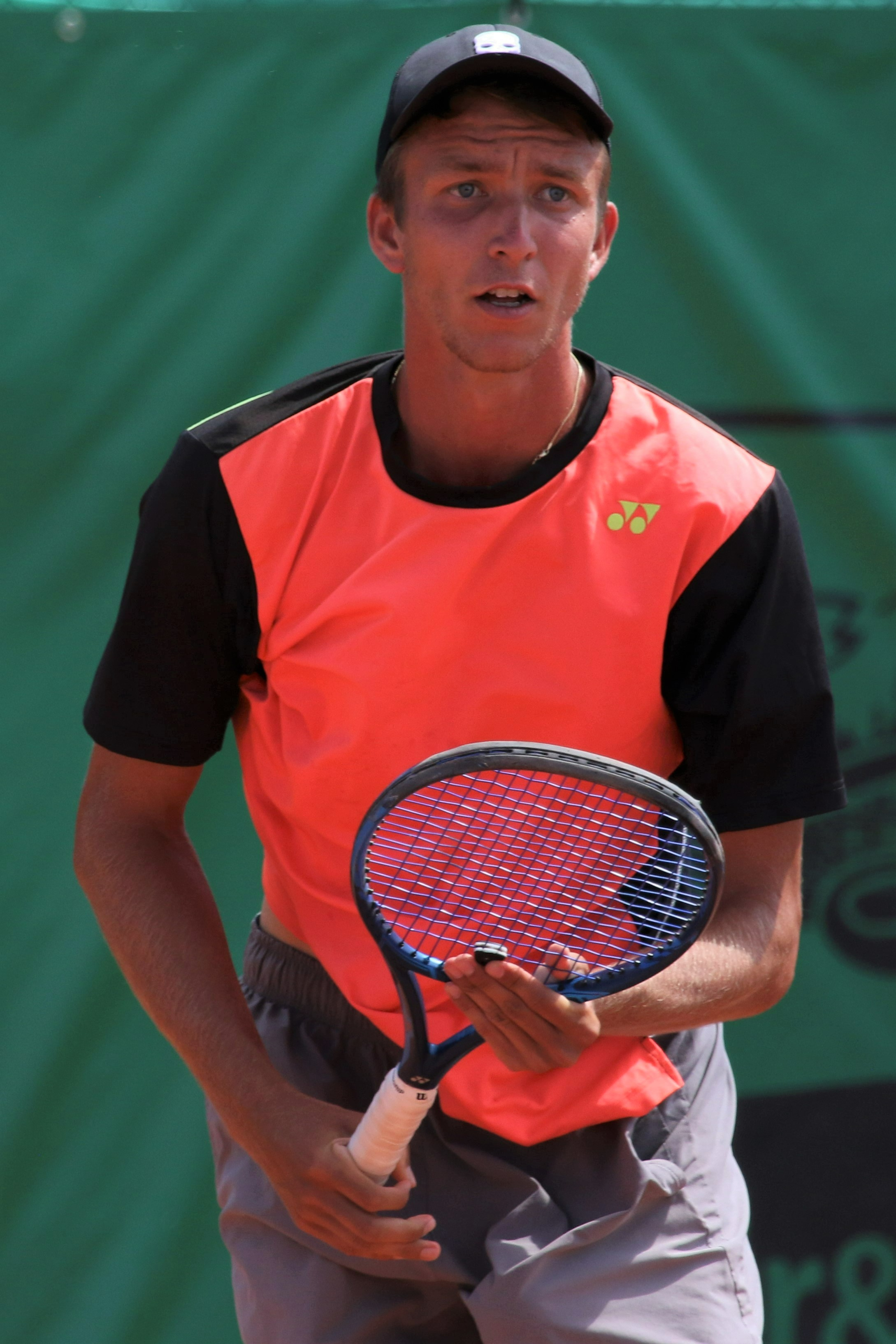
- Lomakin at the 2022 Internationaux de Tennis de Blois
- Country (sports): Kazakhstan
- Born: 18 March 1998 (age 28) Temirtau, Kazakhstan
- Height: 1.98 m (6 ft 6 in)
- Plays: Right-handed (two-handed backhand)
- Prize money: US $146,093

Singles
- Career record: 0–0
- Career titles: 0
- Highest ranking: No. 713 (29 July 2024)
- Current ranking: No. 855 (21 September 2026)

Doubles
- Career record: 0–1
- Career titles: 0
- Highest ranking: No. 189 (20 March 2023)
- Current ranking: No. 296 (21 September 2026)
- Last updated on: 21 September 2026.

Grigoriy Lomakin (born 18 March 1998) is a Kazakh tennis player who specializes in doubles. He has a career high ATP doubles ranking of world No. 189 achieved on 20 March 2023 and a singles ranking of No. 713 achieved on 29 July 2024.

== Career ==
Lomakin made his ATP main draw debut at the 2022 Astana Open in the doubles draw partnering Denis Yevseyev.

== ATP Challenger Tour finals ==
=== Doubles: 5 (5 runner-up) ===
Legend ATP Challenger Tour (0–5)

Result	W–L	Date	Tournament	Tier	Surface	Partner	Opponents	Score
Loss	0–1	Jul 2021	Nur-Sultan, Kazakhstan	Challenger	Hard	(Ukraine) Oleksii Krutykh	(Chinese Taipei) Hsu Yu-hsiou (Zimbabwe) Benjamin Lock	3–6, 4–6
Loss	0–2	Apr 2022	Pereira, Colombia	Challenger	Clay	(Ukraine) Oleg Prihodko	(Venezuela) Luis David Martínez (Colombia) Cristian Rodríguez	6–7^{(2–7)}, 6–7^{(3–7)}
Loss	0–3	May 2026	Bengaluru, India	Challenger	Hard	Petr Bar Biryukov	(India) Niki Kaliyanda Poonacha (India) Saketh Myneni	2–6, 3–6
Loss	0–4	May 2026	Bengaluru, India	Challenger	Hard	Petr Bar Biryukov	(India) Adil Kalyanpur (India) Mukund Sasikumar	7-6^{(7–3)}, 4–6, [3-10]
Loss	0–5	Aug 2026	President's Cup, Kazakhstan	Challenger	Hard	Petr Bar Biryukov	(Japan) Taisei Ichikawa (Japan) Masamichi Imamura	6–3, 6–7^{(4–7)}, [5–10]

== ITF Tour Finals ==
=== Singles: 1 (title) ===
Legend (singles) ITF Futures / World Tennis Tour (1–0)

Result	W–L	Date	Tournament	Tier	Surface	Opponent	Score
Win	1–0	Aug 2023	M15 Nakhon Si Thammarat, Thailand	World Tennis Tour	Hard	(Thailand) Kasidit Samrej	7–6^{(7–2)}, 4–6, 6–3

=== Doubles: 53 (31 titles, 22 runner-ups) ===
Legend (doubles) ITF Futures / World Tennis Tour (31–22)	Titles by surface Hard (15–19) Clay (16–8)

Result	W–L	Date	Tournament	Tier	Surface	Partner	Opponents	Score
Win	1–0	Jul 2018	Georgia F3, Telavi	Futures	Clay	(Georgia (country)) George Tsivadze	(Ukraine) Vladyslav Orlov (Ukraine) Oleg Prihodko	6–7^{(8–10)}, 7–6^{(7–5)}, [10–8]
Win	2–0	Aug 2018	Belarus F3, Minsk	Futures	Hard	(Georgia (country)) George Tsivadze	(Czech Republic) Marek Gengel (Czech Republic) David Poljak	7–5, 7–6^{(7–4)}
Win	3–0	Sep 2018	Kazakhstan F6, Almaty	Futures	Clay	(Kazakhstan) Sagadat Ayap	(Italy) Andrea Bessire (Italy) Francesco Bessire	6–3, 6–4
Win	4–0	Sep 2018	Kazakhstan F8, Shymkent	Futures	Clay	(Georgia (country)) George Tsivadze	(Belarus) Aliaksandr Bury (Belarus) Maksim Zubkou	7–6^{(7–3)}, 6–3
Loss	4–1	Mar 2019	M15 Antalya, Turkey	World Tennis Tour	Clay	(Ukraine) Vladyslav Orlov	(Brazil) Felipe Meligeni Alves (Colombia) Cristian Rodríguez	3–6, 4–6
Win	5–1	Apr 2019	M15 Antalya, Turkey	World Tennis Tour	Clay	(Ukraine) Vladyslav Orlov	(Switzerland) Louroi Martinez (Switzerland) Damien Wenger	6–4, 6–7^{(4–7)}, [10–6]
Loss	5–2	Apr 2019	M15 Andijan, Uzbekistan	World Tennis Tour	Hard	(Greece) Markos Kalovelonis	(Kazakhstan) Timur Khabibulin (Ukraine) Vladyslav Manafov	5–7, 1–6
Loss	5–3	May 2019	M15 Tbilisi, Georgia	World Tennis Tour	Hard	(Georgia (country)) George Tsivadze	(Czech Republic) Michal Konečný (Czech Republic) Ondřej Krstev	3–6, 3–6
Loss	5–4	May 2019	M15 Antalya, Turkey	World Tennis Tour	Clay	(Turkey) Sarp Ağabigün	(Russia) Mikhail Korovin (Ukraine) Oleg Prihodko	3–6, 7–5, [5–10]
Loss	5–5	Aug 2019	M15 Oskemen, Kazakhstan	World Tennis Tour	Hard	(Kazakhstan) Sagadat Ayap	(Russia) Konstantin Kravchuk (Russia) Alexander Pavlioutchenkov	5–7, 3–6
Loss	5–6	Sep 2019	M25 Almaty, Kazakhstan	World Tennis Tour	Hard	(Georgia (country)) George Tsivadze	(Belarus) Ivan Liutarevich (Ukraine) Vladyslav Manafov	5–7, 2–6
Win	6–6	Oct 2019	M25 Tây Ninh, Vietnam	World Tennis Tour	Hard	(Japan) Jumpei Yamasaki	(India) Sidharth Rawat (India) Manish Sureshkumar	6–0, 6–1
Win	7–6	Nov 2019	M15 Antalya, Turkey	World Tennis Tour	Clay	(Ukraine) Oleg Prihodko	(Netherlands) Mats Hermans (Netherlands) Bart Stevens	6–4, 6–3
Loss	7–7	Nov 2019	M15 Antalya, Turkey	World Tennis Tour	Clay	(Russia) Maxim Ratniuk	(Argentina) Nicolás Alberto Arreche (Argentina) Matias Zukas	6–7^{(3–7)}, 3–6
Win	8–7	Apr 2021	M15 Cairo, Egypt	World Tennis Tour	Clay	(Germany) Kai Wehnelt	(Argentina) Juan Ignacio Galarza (Argentina) Juan Pablo Paz	6–4, 6–2
Win	9–7	May 2021	M15 Shymkent, Kazakhstan	World Tennis Tour	Clay	(Russia) Yan Bondarevskiy	(Uzbekistan) Sanjar Fayziev (Greece) Markos Kalovelonis	6–3, 6–4
Win	10–7	Jun 2021	M15 Shymkent, Kazakhstan	World Tennis Tour	Clay	(Russia) Yan Bondarevskiy	(Russia) Marat Sharipov (Kazakhstan) Beibit Zhukayev	7–5, 6–2
Win	11–7	Aug 2021	M15 Telavi, Georgia	World Tennis Tour	Clay	(Russia) Yan Bondarevskiy	(Russia) Denis Klok (Ukraine) Oleg Prihodko	6–4, 3–6, [10–6]
Win	12–7	Sep 2021	M15 Chornomorsk, Ukraine	World Tennis Tour	Clay	(Ukraine) Vladyslav Manafov	(Russia) Yan Bondarevskiy (Ukraine) Oleg Prihodko	7–6^{(7–5)}, 4–6, [10–8]
Win	13–7	Oct 2021	M15 Monastir, Tunisia	World Tennis Tour	Hard	(India) Niki Kaliyanda Poonacha	(Tunisia) Anis Ghorbel (Switzerland) Mirko Martinez	6–1, 7–5
Loss	13–8	Nov 2021	M15 Sharm El Sheikh, Egypt	World Tennis Tour	Hard	(Chinese Taipei) Ray Ho	(United Kingdom) Ben Jones (United Kingdom) Daniel Little	4–6, 5–7
Win	14–8	Dec 2021	M15 Antalya, Turkey	World Tennis Tour	Clay	(Ukraine) Oleg Prihodko	(Japan) Toshihide Matsui (Japan) Kaito Uesugi	7–5, 3–6, [10–5]
Loss	14–9	Jan 2022	M15 Cairo, Egypt	World Tennis Tour	Clay	(Chinese Taipei) Ray Ho	(Bulgaria) Anthony Genov (North Macedonia) Tomislav Jotovski	1–6, 6–3, [7–10]
Win	15–9	Jan 2022	M15 Cairo, Egypt	World Tennis Tour	Clay	(Chinese Taipei) Ray Ho	(Zimbabwe) Benjamin Lock (Poland) Daniel Michalski	7–6^{(7–2)}, 7–6^{(7–2)}
Win	16–9	Aug 2022	M25 Tbilisi, Georgia	World Tennis Tour	Hard	Ivan Liutarevich	Erik Arutiunian; Daniil Ostapenkov	3–6, 7–6^{(7–4)}, [10–5]
Loss	16–10	Dec 2022	M25 Vacaria, Brazil	World Tennis Tour	Clay	(Brazil) Igor Gimenez	(Brazil) João Victor Couto Loureiro (Brazil) Gustavo Heide	6–3, 6–7^{(5–7)}, [5–10]
Win	17–10	Dec 2022	M15 Sharm El Sheikh, Egypt	World Tennis Tour	Hard	Marat Sharipov	(Italy) Gabriele Pennaforti (Canada) Kelsey Stevenson	Walkover
Loss	17–11	May 2023	M15 Tbilisi, Georgia	World Tennis Tour	Hard	(Turkey) Sarp Ağabigün	Aliaksandr Liaonenka; Alexander Zgirovsky	2–6, 2–6
Win	18–11	Jun 2023	M15 Tehran, Iran	World Tennis Tour	Clay	Egor Agafonov	Erik Arutiunian; Daniel Ibragimov	6–3, 7–6^{(7–4)}
Win	19–11	Jun 2023	M15 Tehran, Iran	World Tennis Tour	Clay	Egor Agafonov	(India) Yash Chaurasia (India) Ishaque Eqbal	7–5, 6–2
Loss	19–12	Sep 2023	M15 Nakhon Si Thammarat, Thailand	World Tennis Tour	Hard	(Thailand) Maximus Jones	(China) Qian Sun (Thailand) Wishaya Trongcharoenchaikul	4–6, 4–6
Loss	19–13	Oct 2023	M15 Doha, Qatar	World Tennis Tour	Hard	Bogdan Bobrov	Egor Agafonov; Marat Sharipov	6–7^{(7–9)}, 2–6
Loss	19–14	Oct 2023	M15 Telavi, Georgia	World Tennis Tour	Clay	(Georgia (country)) Zura Tkemaladze	Teymuraz Gabashvili (Georgia (country)) Aleksandre Metreveli	4–6, 4–6
Win	20–14	Nov 2023	M15 Sharm El Sheikh, Egypt	World Tennis Tour	Hard	Evgeny Philippov	(Italy) Tommaso Compagnucci (Serbia) Viktor Jovic	6–2, 7–5
Loss	20–15	Nov 2023	M15 Sharm El Sheikh, Egypt	World Tennis Tour	Hard	Evgeny Philippov	(United Kingdom) Ben Jones (United Kingdom) David Stevenson	6–7^{(5–7)}, 6–7^{(2–7)}
Win	21–15	Dec 2023	M15 Sharm El Sheikh, Egypt	World Tennis Tour	Hard	(Ukraine) Vadym Ursu	(Italy) Filiberto Fumagalli (Italy) Samuel Vincent Ruggeri	6–2, 4–6, [10–5]
Loss	21–16	Apr 2024	M25 Sharm El Sheikh, Egypt	World Tennis Tour	Hard	Ilia Simakin	(United Kingdom) Ben Jones (Switzerland) Jakub Paul	2–6, 2–6
Win	22–16	Apr 2024	M15 Shymkent, Kazakhstan	World Tennis Tour	Clay	Pavel Verbin	(Georgia (country)) Aleksandre Bakshi (Germany) Niklas Schell	7–6^{(7–1)}, 6–3
Win	23–16	Apr 2024	M15 Shymkent, Kazakhstan	World Tennis Tour	Clay	Pavel Verbin	(India) S D Prajwal Dev (India) Sai Karteek Reddy Ganta	7–6^{(11–9)}, 6–3
Win	24–16	May 2024	M15 Tbilisi, Georgia	World Tennis Tour	Hard	(Czech Republic) Marek Gengel	(Georgia (country)) Aleksandre Bakshi (Georgia (country)) Zura Tkemaladze	2–6, 7–6^{(7–3)}, [10–8]
Win	25–16	May 2024	M15 Monastir, Tunisia	World Tennis Tour	Hard	Ilia Simakin	(Portugal) Pedro Araujo (Portugal) Diogo Marques	6–1, 7–5
Win	26–16	Jun 2024	M15 Monastir, Tunisia	World Tennis Tour	Hard	(Brazil) Paulo André Saraiva dos Santos	(Germany) Niklas Schell (United Kingdom) Marcus Walters	4–6, 6–2, [10–8]
Win	27–16	Jun 2024	M15 Monastir, Tunisia	World Tennis Tour	Hard	Egor Agafonov	(Brazil) Paulo Andre Saraiva dos Santos (South Africa) Kris van Wyk	6–3, 6–3
Loss	27–17	Jun 2024	M15 Monastir, Tunisia	World Tennis Tour	Hard	Egor Agafonov	(Brazil) Paulo Andre Saraiva dos Santos (Argentina) Mateo Matulovich	5-7, 6–4, [8–10]
Loss	27–18	Jul 2024	M25 Astana, Kazakhstan	World Tennis Tour	Hard	(Georgia (country)) Zura Tkemaladze	Ilia Simakin; Egor Agafonov	2-6, 4–6
Loss	27–19	Mar 2025	M25 Ahmedabad, India	World Tennis Tour	Hard	(United States) Nick Chappell	(India) Adil Kalyanpur (Australia) Kody Pearson	3–6, 6–4, [14–16]
Win	28–19	Mar 2025	M25 Bengaluru, India	World Tennis Tour	Hard	(United States) Nick Chappell	(India) S D Prajwal Dev (India) Nitin Kumar Sinha	6–2, 7–6^{(7–5)}
Loss	28–20	Apr 2025	M25 Anning, China	World Tennis Tour	Clay	(Thailand) Wishaya Trongcharoenchaikul	Mikalai Haliak (Chinese Taipei) Lo Yi-jui	6–7^{(1–7)}, 4–6
Loss	28–21	Jun 2025	M15 Monastir, Tunisia	World Tennis Tour	Hard	(United Kingdom) Luca Pow	(Spain) Alejandro Manzanera Pertusa (India) Nitin Kumar Sinha	6–7^{(11–13)}, 3–6
Win	29–21	Sep 2025	M15 Kayseri, Turkiye	World Tennis Tour	Hard	(Germany) Kai Wehnelt	(France) Constantin Bittoun Kouzmine (United Kingdom) Stefan Cooper	6–0, 3–2 ret.
Loss	29–22	Dec 2025	M15 Gwalior, India	World Tennis Tour	Hard	(India) Ishaque Eqbal	(India) Aryan Shah (India) Atharva Sharma	6–2, 3–6, [9–11]
Win	30–22	Jan 2026	M15 Hyderabad, India	World Tennis Tour	Hard	(India) Ishaque Eqbal	(Ukraine) Eric Vanshelboim (Switzerland) Jeffrey von der Schulenburg	6–2, 6–3
Win	31–22	Jun 2026	M15 Ma'anshan, China	World Tennis Tour	Hard	(Australia) Joshua Charlton	(South Korea) Cho Seong-woo (China) Yang Zijiang	6–2, 4–6, [10–7]
