= Philip Sekulic =

Australian tennis player (born 2003)

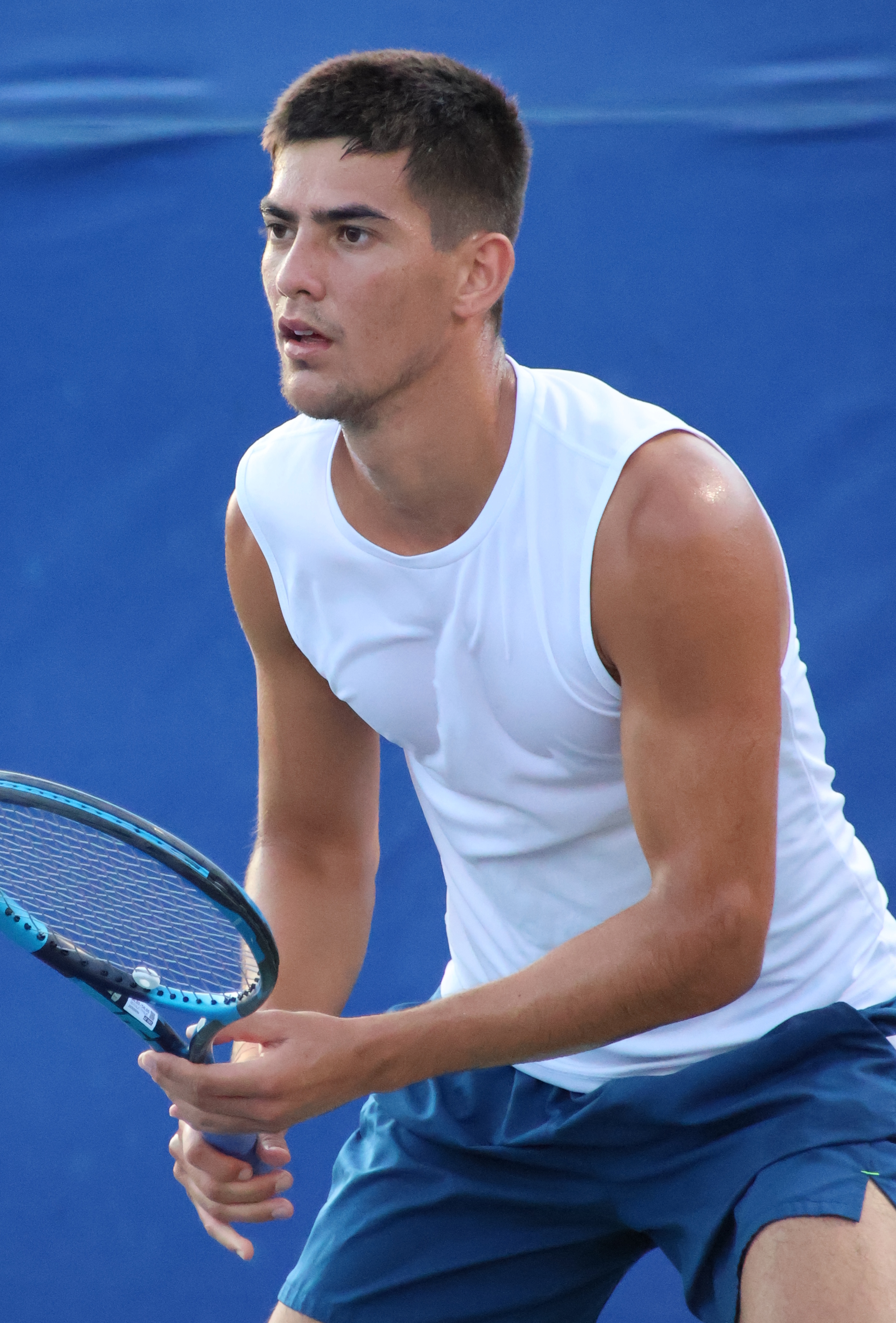
- Sekulic in 2026
- Country (sports): Australia
- Born: 5 September 2003 (age 23) Subiaco, Australia
- Height: 1.91 m (6 ft 3 in)
- Plays: Right-handed (two-handed backhand)
- Coach: Tomo Sekulic
- Prize money: US $314,339

Singles
- Career record: 1–2 (at ATP Tour level, Grand Slam level, and in Davis Cup)
- Career titles: 0
- Highest ranking: No. 225 (15 July 2024)
- Current ranking: No. 339 (19 October 2026)

Grand Slam singles results
- Australian Open: Q2 (2022)
- Wimbledon: Q1 (2024)

Doubles
- Career record: 0–0 (at ATP Tour level, Grand Slam level, and in Davis Cup)
- Career titles: 0
- Highest ranking: No. 989 (8 August 2022)
- Last updated on: 19 October 2026.

Philip Sekulic (Croatian: Sekulić; born 5 September 2003) is an Australian tennis player. He has a career high ATP singles ranking of world No. 225 achieved on 15 July 2024 and a career high ATP doubles ranking of No. 989 achieved on 22 August 2022.

== Career ==
=== 2023: ATP and Masters debuts and first win, top 300 ===
Ranked No. 325, Sekulic made his ATP main draw debut at the 2023 Chengdu Open after defeating Nick Chappell and Evgeny Donskoy to qualify for the singles main draw. He won his first ATP match defeating Nuno Borges. As a result, he moved more than 30 positions up into the top 300 on 25 September 2023.

He made his debut in qualifying at a Masters 1000 level at the 2023 Rolex Shanghai Masters.

== Performance timeline ==
Key
W	F	SF	QF	#R	RR	Q#	DNQ	A	NH

(W) winner; (F) finalist; (SF) semifinalist; (QF) quarterfinalist; (#R) rounds 4, 3, 2, 1; (RR) round-robin stage; (Q#) qualification round; (DNQ) did not qualify; (A) absent; (NH) not held; (SR) strike rate (events won / competed); (W–L) win–loss record.

=== Singles ===
Tournament!	2022	2023	2024	2025	2026	SR	W–L	Win %
Grand Slam tournaments
Australian Open	Q2	Q1	Q1	A	Q1	0 / 0	0–0	–
French Open	A	A	A	A		0 / 0	0–0	–
Wimbledon	A	A	Q1	A		0 / 0	0–0	–
US Open	A	A	A	A		0 / 0	0–0	–
Win–loss	0–0	0–0	0–0	0–0	0–0	0 / 0	0–0	–
ATP Masters 1000
Indian Wells Masters	A	A	A	A		0 / 0	0–0	–
Miami Open	A	A	A	A		0 / 0	0–0	–
Monte Carlo Masters	A	A	A	A		0 / 0	0–0	–
Madrid Open	A	A	A	A		0 / 0	0-0	–
Italian Open	A	A	A	A		0 / 0	0–0	–
Canadian Open	A	A	A	A		0 / 0	0–0	–
Cincinnati Masters	A	A	A	A		0 / 0	0–0	–
Shanghai Masters	NH	1R	A	A		0 / 1	0–1	0%
Paris Masters	A	A	A	A		0 / 0	0–0	–
Win–loss	0–0	0–1	0–0	0–0	0–0	0 / 1	0–1	–

== ATP Challenger and ITF World Tennis Tour finals ==
=== Singles: 10 (2–8) ===
Legend (singles) ATP Challenger Tour (0–2) ITF World Tennis Tour (2–6)	Finals by surface Hard (2–7) Clay (0–0) Grass (0–1) Carpet (0–0)

Result	W–L	Date	Tournament	Tier	Surface	Opponent	Score
Loss	0–1	Jul 2023	Granby, Canada	Challenger	Hard	(Canada) Alexis Galarneau	4–6, 6–3, 3–6
Loss	0–2	May 2026	Bengaluru, India	Challenger	Hard	(United States) Keegan Smith	2–6, 5–7
Loss	0–1	Nov 2021	M15 Indore, India	WTT	Hard	(India) Manish Sureshkumar	4–6, 6–4, 2–6
Loss	0–2	Nov 2021	M15 New Delhi, India	WTT	Hard	(Monaco) Valentin Vacherot	7–5, 2–6, 6–7^{(3–7)}
Loss	0–3	Oct 2022	M25 Cairns, Australia	WTT	Hard	(Australia) Dane Sweeny	2–6, 3–6
Loss	0–4	Feb 2023	M25 Swan Hill, Australia	WTT	Grass	(Australia) Tristan Schoolkate	6–4, 4–6, 3–6
Loss	0–5	May 2023	M15 Nakhon Si Thammarat, Thailand	WTT	Hard	(Israel) Orel Kimhi	4–6, 5–7
Loss	0–6	Aug 2025	M25 Bali, Indonesia	WTT	Hard	(France) Arthur Géa	1–6, 2–6
Win	1–6	Mar 2026	M25 Kolkata, India	WTT	Hard	(India) Karan Singh	6–1, 7–6^{(7–1)}
Win	2–6	Mar 2026	M25 Mumbai, India	WTT	Hard	(India) Sidharth Rawat	6–1, 6–2

=== Doubles: 1 (1–0) ===
Legend (singles) ATP Challenger Tour (0–0) ITF World Tennis Tour (1–0)	Finals by surface Hard (1–0) Clay (0–0) Grass (0–0) Carpet (0–0)

Result	W–L	Date	Tournament	Tier	Surface	Partner	Opponents	Score
Win	1–0	Mar 2022	M25 Bendigo, Australia	WTT	Hard	(Australia) Akira Santillan	(Australia) Dane Sweeny (Australia) Li Tu	7–5, 6–7^{(7–9)}, [10–7]
