= Oleg Prihodko =

North Macedonian tennis player

- Country (sports): Ukraine (2016–2026); North Macedonia (May 2026-present)
- Residence: Ukraine
- Born: 3 October 1997 (age 29) Pavlohrad, Ukraine
- Height: 1.80 m (5 ft 11 in)
- Plays: Right-handed (two handed-backhand)
- Coach: Michal Kadlacek
- Prize money: US $218,250

Singles
- Career record: 0–0 (at ATP Tour level, Grand Slam level, and in Davis Cup)
- Career titles: 1 Challenger, 6 ITF
- Highest ranking: No. 307 (18 August 2025)
- Current ranking: No. 442 (19 October 2026)

Doubles
- Career record: 0–0 (at ATP Tour level, Grand Slam level, and in Davis Cup)
- Career titles: 2 Challenger, 23 ITF
- Highest ranking: No. 121 (27 February 2023)
- Current ranking: No. 983 (19 October 2026)
- Last updated on: 19 October 2026.

Oleg Prihodko (born 3 October 1997) is a Ukrainian-born Macedonian tennis player. He has a career high ATP singles ranking of world No. 307 achieved on 18 August 2025 and a career high ATP doubles ranking of No. 121 achieved on 27 February 2023. He is currently the No. 1 player from North Macedonia.

== Career ==
As a junior he won the Ukrzakhid ITF tournament in 2013 and 2014 as well as the Vila Do Conde Junior Tennis Cup in 2013. In junior doubles he won the Donetsk City Cup with his doubles partner Vladyslav Lobak.

== Nationality representation ==
On 24 May 2026, Prihodko announced he switched his nationality from Ukraine to North Macedonia. He had previously attracted backlash in Ukraine for playing in doubles with Russian and Belarusian players, and for also saying he opposed the suspension of these players from international competitions. He was the No. 2 Ukrainian tennis player on 4 May 2026, before his switch to North Macedonia, whereupon he became the No. 1 Macedonian tennis player above Kalin Ivanovski, at world No. 399 on 25 May 2026.

== ATP Challenger and ITF Tour finals ==
=== Singles: 17 (7–10) ===
Legend (singles) ATP Challenger Tour (1–1) ITF Futures Tour / World Tennis Tour (6–9)	Titles by surface Hard (1–1) Clay (6–7) Carpet (0–2)

Result	W–L	Date	Tournament	Tier	Surface	Opponent	Score
Loss	0–1	May 2019	M15 Antalya, Turkey	World Tennis Tour	Clay	(Bulgaria) Dimitar Kuzmanov	6–3, 2–6, 1–6
Win	1–1	Aug 2021	M15 Telavi, Georgia	World Tennis Tour	Clay	(Russia) Yan Bondarevskiy	7–6^{(7–4)}, 6–3
Loss	1–2	Dec 2021	Antalya, Turkey	Challenger	Clay	(Russia) Evgenii Tiurnev	6–3, 4–6, 4–6
Loss	1–3	Mar 2022	M25 Anapoima, Colombia	World Tennis Tour	Clay	(Argentina) Alejo Lorenzo Lingua Lavallén	3–6, 0–6
Loss	1–4	Apr 2022	M15 Antalya, Turkey	World Tennis Tour	Clay	(Sweden) Dragoș Nicolae Mădăraș	4–6, 2–6
Win	2–4	May 2022	M15 Antalya, Turkey	World Tennis Tour	Clay	(Spain) Pablo Llamas Ruiz	6–2, 6–4
Win	3–4	Jan 2024	M15 Kish Island, Iran	World Tennis Tour	Clay	(Italy) Lorenzo Bocchi	6–3, 6–7^{(7–9)}, 6–0
Loss	3–5	Jan 2024	M15 Kish Island, Iran	World Tennis Tour	Clay	(Syria) Hazem Naw	0–6, 4–6
Loss	3–6	Mar 2024	M15 Heraklion, Greece	World Tennis Tour	Hard	(United States) Henrik Wiersholm	4–6, 3–6
Loss	3–7	Apr 2024	M15 Antalya, Turkey	World Tennis Tour	Clay	(Italy) Facundo Juarez	6–3, 6–7^{(2–7)}, 4–6
Loss	3–8	May 2024	M15 Kursumlijska Banja, Serbia	World Tennis Tour	Clay	(Bulgaria) Yanaki Milev	6–7^{(4–7)}, 3–6
Win	4–8	Jun 2024	M15 Grodzisk Mazowiecki, Poland	World Tennis Tour	Clay	(Argentina) Ignacio Monzon	6–2, 6–4
Win	5–8	Aug 2024	M15 Kottingbrunn, Austria	World Tennis Tour	Clay	(Germany) Elmar Ejupovic	7–5, 7–5
Win	6–8	Aug 2024	M15 Slovenj Gradec, Slovenia	World Tennis Tour	Clay	(Czech Republic) Dominik Kellovský	2–6, 6–0, 6–7^{(4–7)}
Loss	6–9	Oct 2024	M25 Sarreguemines, France	World Tennis Tour	Carpet	(Belgium) Michael Geerts	4–6, 5–7
Loss	6–10	Jan 2025	M25 Nussloch, Germany	World Tennis Tour	Carpet	(France) Tom Paris	4–6, 4–6
Win	7–10	Feb 2026	Cesenatico, Italy	Challenger	Hard (i)	(Italy) Raúl Brancaccio	6–7^{(8–10)}, 6–4, 6–4

=== Doubles: 50 (24–26) ===
Legend (singles) ATP Challenger Tour (3–8) ITF Futures Tour / World Tennis Tour (21–18)	Titles by surface Hard (1–4) Clay (23–22) Grass (0–0) Carpet (0–0)

Result	W–L	Date	Tournament	Tier	Surface	Partner	Opponents	Score
Loss	0–1	Sep 2016	Ukraine F5 Futures, Kyiv	Futures	Hard	(Ukraine) Daniil Zarichanskiy	(Ukraine) Igor Karpovets (Ukraine) Denys Molchanov	4–6, 3–6
Loss	0–2	Dec 2016	Turkey F51 Futures, Antalya	Futures	Hard	(Ukraine) Olexiy Kolisnyk	(Turkey) Cem Ilkel (Turkey) Yankı Erel	4–6, 3–6
Loss	0–3	May 2017	Ukraine F3 Futures Cherkassy	Futures	Clay	(Ukraine) Olexiy Kolisnyk	(Spain) Carlos Boluda-Purkiss (Brazil) Jordan Correia	5–7, 4–6
Loss	0–4	Jul 2017	Poland F4 Futures Mragowo	Futures	Clay	(Ukraine) Olexiy Kolisnyk	(Poland) Adrian Andrzejczuk (Poland) Pawel Cias	7–6^{(7–1)}, 6–7^{(6–8)}, 7–10
Win	1–4	Jul 2017	Poland F6 Futures Mragowo	Futures	Clay	(Ukraine) Olexiy Kolisnyk	(Netherlands) Colin van Beem (Ukraine) Daniil Zarichanskiy	6–4, 6–3
Win	2–4	Jul 2017	Poland F8 Futures Mragowo	Futures	Clay	(Ukraine) Olexiy Kolisnyk	(Poland) Maciej Smola (Poland) Michal Dembek	7–6^{(8–6)}, 6–4
Win	3–4	Aug 2017	Slovakia F3 Futures Bratislava	Futures	Clay	(Ukraine) Olexiy Kolisnyk	(Slovakia) Marek Semjan (Slovakia) Filip Horanský	7–6^{(7–5)}, 7–5
Loss	3–5	Oct 2017	Egypt F32 Futures Sharm El Sheikh	Futures	Hard	(Ukraine) Olexiy Kolisnyk	(Hungary) Gábor Borsos (Ukraine) Vladyslav Manafov	6–7^{(2–7)}, 5–7
Win	4–5	Mar 2018	Turkey F9 Futures Antalya	Futures	Clay	(Mexico) Luis Patiño	(Brazil) Nicolas Santos (Brazil) Oscar Jose Gutierrez	3–6, 6–3, 10–8
Loss	4–6	Mar 2018	Turkey F12 Futures Antalya	Futures	Clay	(Ukraine) Olexiy Kolisnyk	(Turkey) Cem Ilkel (Turkey) Anıl Yüksel	6–4, 2–6, 7–10
Loss	4–7	Apr 2018	Spain F10 Futures Majadahonda	Futures	Clay	(Spain) Sergio Martos Gornés	(Spain) Marc Giner (Spain) Jaume Pla Malfeito	6–2, 6–7^{(6–8)}, 11–13
Loss	4–8	May 2018	Ukraine F1 Futures Rivne	Futures	Clay	(Ukraine) Vladyslav Orlov	(Ukraine) Volodymyr Uzhylovskyi (Ukraine) Artem Smirnov	2–6, 2–6
Loss	4–9	May 2018	Ukraine F3 Futures Rivne	Futures	Clay	(Ukraine) Vladyslav Orlov	(Ukraine) Volodymyr Uzhylovskyi (Ukraine) Artem Smirnov	5–7, 1–6
Loss	4–10	Jul 2018	Georgia F3 Futures Telavi	Futures	Clay	(Ukraine) Vladyslav Orlov	(Kazakhstan) Grigoriy Lomakin (Georgia (country)) George Tsivadze	7–6^{(8–6)}, 6–7^{(5–7)}, 8–10
Loss	4–11	Dec 2018	Turkey F41 Futures Antalya	Futures	Clay	(Czech Republic) Tadeas Paroulek	(Russia) Markos Kalovelonis (Uzbekistan) Sanjar Fayziev	5–7, 6–3, 6–10
Win	5–11	Apr 2019	M15 Antalya, Turkey	World Tennis Tour	Clay	(Russia) Mikhail Korovin	(Netherlands) Marc Dijkhuizen (Netherlands) Mats Hermans	4–6, 6–3, 10–8
Win	6–11	May 2019	M15 Antalya, Turkey	World Tennis Tour	Clay	(Russia) Mikhail Korovin	(Turkey) Sarp Ağabigün (Kazakhstan) Grigoriy Lomakin	6–3, 5–7, 10–5
Win	7–11	May 2019	M15 Irpin, Ukraine	World Tennis Tour	Clay	(Ukraine) Georgii Kravchenko	(United States) Michael Zhu (Poland) Piotr Matuszewski	6–3, 6–2
Win	8–11	July 2019	M15 Vilnius, Lithuania	World Tennis Tour	Clay	(Russia) Mikhail Korovin	(Lithuania) Feliksas Sakalauskas (Lithuania) Tomas Vaise	7–6^{(7–3)}, 7–6^{(7–3)}
Loss	8–12	Oct 2019	M15 Antalya, Turkey	World Tennis Tour	Clay	(Russia) Denis Klok	(Romania) Adrian Barbu (Romania) Stefan Palosi	6–1, 4–6, 5–10
Win	9–12	Nov 2019	M15 Antalya, Turkey	World Tennis Tour	Clay	(Kazakhstan) Grigoriy Lomakin	(Netherlands) Mats Hermans (Netherlands) Bart Stevens	6–4, 6–3
Win	10–12	Feb 2020	M15 Antalya, Turkey	World Tennis Tour	Clay	(Romania) Calin Manda	(Hungary) Péter Nagy (Hungary) Fábián Marozsán	2–6, 7–6^{(7–3)}, 10–8
Win	11–12	Mar 2021	M25 La Nucia, Spain	World Tennis Tour	Clay	(Russia) Yan Bondarevskiy	(Spain) Javier Barranco Cosano (Italy) Raúl Brancaccio	6–3, 6–3
Loss	11–13	Jun 2021	M15 Antalya, Turkey	World Tennis Tour	Clay	(Ukraine) Olexiy Kolisnyk	(Argentina) Mariano Kestelboim (Brazil) Daniel Dutra da Silva	6–4, 5–7, 11–13
Loss	11–14	Jul 2021	M15 Antalya, Turkey	World Tennis Tour	Clay	(Ukraine) Olexiy Kolisnyk	(Russia) Vladimir Korolev (Chile) Miguel Fernando Pereira	1–6, 3–6
Win	12–14	Jul 2021	M15 Sofia, Bulgaria	World Tennis Tour	Clay	(Russia) Denis Klok	(Chinese Taipei) Ray Ho (Romania) Bogdan Pavel	7–5, 6–4
Loss	12–15	Aug 2021	M15 Telavi, Georgia	World Tennis Tour	Clay	(Russia) Denis Klok	(Russia) Yan Bondarevskiy (Kazakhstan) Grigoriy Lomakin	1–6, 3–6
Loss	12–16	Aug 2021	M15 Chornomorsk, Ukraine	World Tennis Tour	Clay	(Russia) Yan Bondarevskiy	(Ukraine) Vladyslav Manafov (Kazakhstan) Grigoriy Lomakin	6–7^{(5–7)}, 6–4, 8–10
Win	13–16	Sep 2021	M15 Zlatibor, Serbia	World Tennis Tour	Clay	(Russia) Yan Bondarevskiy	(Hungary) Péter Nagy (Hungary) Gergely Madarász	1–6, 6–0, 10–7
Win	14–16	Nov 2021	M15 Antalya, Turkey	World Tennis Tour	Clay	(Kazakhstan) Grigoriy Lomakin	(Japan) Toshihide Matsui (Japan) Kaito Uesugi	7–5, 3–6, 10–5
Win	15–16	Feb 2022	M15 Punta Cana, Dominican republic	World Tennis Tour	Clay	(Austria) David Pichler	(France) Jurgen Briand (France) Alexis Musialek	6–3, 6–3
Win	16–16	Feb 2022	M15 Punta Cana, Dominican Republic	World Tennis Tour	Clay	(Austria) David Pichler	(Peru) Conner Huertas del Pino (Peru) Jorge Panta	6–0, 6–2
Loss	16–17	Mar 2022	Pereira, Colombia	Challenger	Clay	(Kazakhstan) Grigoriy Lomakin	(Venezuela) Luis David Martínez (Colombia) Cristian Rodríguez	6–7^{(2–7)}, 6–7^{(3–7)}
Win	17–17	May 2022	M15 Antalya, Turkey	World Tennis Tour	Clay	(Moldova) Ilya Snitari	(Czech Republic) Jiri Barnat (Czech Republic) Filip Duda	6–3, 6–3
Loss	17–18	Jun 2022	Bratislava, Slovakia	Challenger	Clay	(Ukraine) Vladyslav Manafov	(India) Sriram Balaji (India) Jeevan Nedunchezhiyan	6–7^{(6–8)}, 4–6
Win	18–18	Jul 2022	San Benedetto del Tronto, Italy	Challenger	Clay	(Ukraine) Vladyslav Manafov	(Hungary) Fábián Marozsán (Czech Republic) Lukáš Rosol	4–6, 6–3, [12–10]
Win	19–18	Aug 2022	Banja Luka, Bosnia and Herzegovina	Challenger	Clay	(Ukraine) Vladyslav Manafov	(Germany) Fabian Fallert (Germany) Hendrik Jebens	6–3, 6–4
Loss	19–19	Sep 2022	Lisbon, Portugal	Challenger	Clay	(Ukraine) Vladyslav Manafov	(Czech Republic) Zdeněk Kolář (Portugal) Gonçalo Oliveira	1–6, 6–7^{(4–7)}
Loss	19–20	Nov 2022	M15 Antalya, Turkey	World Tennis Tour	Clay	(Moldova) Ilya Snitari	(Romania) Alexandru Jecan (Germany) Timo Stodder	4–6, 2–6
Win	20–20	Nov 2022	M25 Antalya, Turkey	World Tennis Tour	Clay	(Moldova) Ilya Snitari	(Romania) Alexandru Jecan (Romania) Dan Alexandru Tomescu	6–3, 6–2
Loss	20–21	Nov 2022	M15 Antalya, Turkey	World Tennis Tour	Clay	(Moldova) Ilya Snitari	(Romania) Cezar Crețu (Romania) Alexandru Jecan	4–6, 6–7^{(7–9)}
Win	21–21	Jan 2023	Tigre, Argentina	Challenger	Clay	(Brazil) Daniel Dutra da Silva	(South Korea) Chung Yun-seong (United States) Christian Langmo	6–2, 6–2
Loss	21–22	Jan 2023	Concepción, Chile	Challenger	Clay	(Italy) Luciano Darderi	(Argentina) Guido Andreozzi (Argentina) Guillermo Durán	6–7^{(1–7)}, 7–6^{(7–3)}, [7–10]
Loss	21–23	Feb 2023	Rovereto, Italy	Challenger	Hard (i)	(Ukraine) Vladyslav Manafov	(Romania) Victor Vlad Cornea (Croatia) Franko Škugor	7–6^{(7–3)}, 2–6, [4–10]
Win	22–23	Apr 2023	M25 Split, Croatia	World Tennis Tour	Clay	(Poland) Piotr Matuszewski	(Switzerland) Jérôme Kym (Poland) Maks Kasnikowski	6–2, 7–6^{(8–6)}
Win	23–23	May 2023	M15 Pazardzhik, Bulgaria	World Tennis Tour	Clay	Denis Klok	(Italy) Leonardo Rossi (Italy) Luigi Sorrentino	7–6^{(7–4)}, 6–3
Loss	23–24	Jun 2023	Cali, Colombia	Challenger	Clay	(Brazil) Orlando Luz	(Argentina) Guido Andreozzi (Colombia) Cristian Rodríguez	3–6, 4–6
Loss	23–25	Jun 2023	Rionegro, Colombia	Challenger	Clay	(Brazil) Orlando Luz	(Colombia) Juan Sebastián Gómez (Colombia) Andrés Urrea	3–6, 6–7^{(10–12)}
Win	24–25	Mar 2025	Cherbourg, France	Challenger	Hard (i)	(Ukraine) Vitaliy Sachko	(Slovakia) Lukáš Pokorný (Italy) Giorgio Ricca	6–2, 6–2
Loss	24–26	Sep 2025	Tulln an der Donau, Austria	Challenger	Clay	(Ukraine) Vitaliy Sachko	(Austria) Neil Oberleitner (Austria) Joel Schwärzler	7–5, 3–6, [7–10]
