= 2021 Transylvania Open =

- Date: 25–31 October
- Edition: 1st
- Category: WTA 250
- Draw: 32S / 16Q / 16D
- Prize money: $235,238
- Surface: Hard (Indoor)
- Location: Cluj-Napoca, Romania
- Venue: BT Arena

Champions

Singles
- (Estonia) Anett Kontaveit

Doubles
- (Romania) Irina Bara / (Georgia (country)) Ekaterine Gorgodze
- Transylvania Open

The 2021 Transylvania Open was a women's tennis tournament played on indoor hard courts. It was the first edition of the Transylvania Open, and part of the WTA 250 series of the 2021 WTA Tour. It was held at the BT Arena in Cluj-Napoca, Romania, from 25 October until 31 October 2021. Second-seeded Anett Kontaveit won the singles title. By winning the title, Kontaveit qualified for the WTA Finals.

== Finals ==
=== Singles ===
(Estonia) Anett Kontaveit defeated (Romania) Simona Halep, 6–2, 6–3

- It was Kontaveit's fifth career WTA singles title, and her fourth of the year.

=== Doubles ===
(Romania) Irina Bara / (Georgia (country)) Ekaterine Gorgodze defeated (Serbia) Aleksandra Krunić / (Netherlands) Lesley Pattinama Kerkhove, 4–6, 6–1, [11–9].

- It was the first WTA Tour level doubles title won by either Bara or Gorgodze.

== Singles main draw entrants ==
=== Seeds ===
Country	Player	Rank^{1}	Seed
ROU	Simona Halep	19	1
EST	Anett Kontaveit	20	2
GBR	Emma Raducanu	24	3
SUI	Jil Teichmann	39	4
AUS	Ajla Tomljanović	43	5
UKR	Marta Kostyuk	53	6
ROU	Irina-Camelia Begu	56	7
UKR	Anhelina Kalinina	57	8

- Rankings are as of October 18, 2021.

=== Other entrants ===
The following players received wildcards into the main draw:

- (Romania) Irina Bara
- (Romania) Jaqueline Cristian
- (Romania) Andreea Prisăcariu

The following players received entry using a protected ranking:

- (Germany) Mona Barthel
- (Serbia) Ivana Jorović

The following players received entry from the qualifying draw:

- (Hungary) Anna Bondár
- (Russia) Anastasia Gasanova
- (Romania) Alexandra Ignatik
- (Serbia) Aleksandra Krunić
- (Netherlands) Lesley Pattinama Kerkhove
- (Ukraine) Lesia Tsurenko

The following player received entry as a lucky loser:

- (Croatia) Jana Fett

=== Withdrawals ===
Before the tournament

- (Russia) Ekaterina Alexandrova → replaced by (Slovenia) Polona Hercog
- (Spain) Paula Badosa → replaced by (Germany) Anna-Lena Friedsam
- (Switzerland) Viktorija Golubic → replaced by (Belgium) Alison Van Uytvanck
- (Estonia) Kaia Kanepi → replaced by (Serbia) Ivana Jorović
- (Russia) Veronika Kudermetova → replaced by (United States) Bernarda Pera
- (Belgium) Elise Mertens → replaced by (Romania) Elena-Gabriela Ruse
- (Colombia) Camila Osorio → replaced by (Croatia) Jana Fett
- (Egypt) Mayar Sherif → replaced by (Germany) Mona Barthel

== Doubles main draw entrants ==
=== Seeds ===
Country	Player	Country	Player	Rank^{1}	Seed
USA	Kaitlyn Christian	NZL	Erin Routliffe	107	1
SRB	Aleksandra Krunić	NED	Lesley Pattinama Kerkhove	123	2
ROU	Monica Niculescu	ROU	Elena-Gabriela Ruse	140	3
KAZ	Anna Danilina	NOR	Ulrikke Eikeri	153	4

- Rankings are as of October 18, 2021.

=== Other entrants ===
The following pairs received wildcards into the doubles main draw:

- (Romania) Ilinca Amariei / (Romania) Briana Szabó
- (Romania) Alexandra Ignatik / (Romania) Andreea Prisăcariu

=== Withdrawals ===
Before the tournament

- (Canada) Sharon Fichman / (Mexico) Giuliana Olmos → replaced by (Russia) Alena Fomina-Klotz / (Russia) Ekaterina Yashina
- (Norway) Ulrikke Eikeri / (United States) Catherine Harrison → replaced by (Kazakhstan) Anna Danilina / (Norway) Ulrikke Eikeri
