= 2025 Transylvania Open – Singles =

Singles
- 2025 Transylvania Open

Final
- Champion: Anastasia Potapova
- Runner-up: (Italy) Lucia Bronzetti
- Score: 4–6, 6–1, 6–2

Details
- Draw: 32 (3 WC, 6Q)
- Seeds: 8

Events
Singles	Doubles
← 2024 ·	Transylvania Open	· 2026 →

Anastasia Potapova defeated Lucia Bronzetti in the final, 4–6, 6–1, 6–2 to win the singles title at the 2025 Transylvania Open. It was her third career WTA Tour title.

Karolína Plíšková was the reigning champion, but did not participate this year.

This tournament marked the final professional appearance of two-time major champion and former world No. 1 Simona Halep, who announced her retirement from professional tennis at the tournament. She lost to Bronzetti in the first round.

The first round match between Viktorija Golubic and Arantxa Rus was the longest match on the 2025 WTA Tour thus far. It lasted 3 hours and 30 minutes and had the joint-third longest regular (first to seven) third-set tiebreak of the 2020s (with a 12–10 final scoreline).

== Seeds ==
1. Anastasia Potapova (champion)
2. (Serbia) Olga Danilović (second round)
3. (United States) Peyton Stearns (second round)
4. (Ukraine) Anhelina Kalinina (quarterfinals)
5. (Czech Republic) Kateřina Siniaková (semifinals, retired)
6. (Spain) Jéssica Bouzas Maneiro (first round)
7. (Italy) Elisabetta Cocciaretto (quarterfinals)
8. (Romania) Jaqueline Cristian (first round)

== Draw ==
=== Key ===
- Q = Qualifier
- WC = Wild card
- LL = Lucky loser
- Alt = Alternate
- SE = Special exempt
- PR = Protected ranking
- ITF = ITF entry
- JE = Junior exempt
- w/o = Walkover
- r = Retired
- d = Defaulted
- SR = Special ranking

=== Finals ===
Semifinals
1	Anastasia Potapova	6	7
LL	Aliaksandra Sasnovich	3	5
(Italy) Lucia Bronzetti	4
5	(Czech Republic) Kateřina Siniaková	0^{r}

Final
1	Anastasia Potapova	4	6	6
(Italy) Lucia Bronzetti	6	1	2

=== Top half ===
First round
1	A Potapova	6	6
PR	(Austria) J Grabher	4	0
(Netherlands) A Rus	5	6	6^{10}
(Switzerland) V Golubic	7	4	7^{12}
Q	(Spain) S Sorribes Tormo	2	2
A Blinkova	6	6
Q	(Germany) E Seidel	6	6
8	(Romania) J Cristian	4	2
4	(Ukraine) A Kalinina	6	6
WC	(Romania) E-G Ruse	2	3
Q	(Hungary) A Bondár	6^{2}	6^{6}
(Netherlands) S Lamens	7^{7}	7^{8}
(Romania) S Cîrstea	1	6	4
Q	(Canada) M Stakusic	6	1	6
LL	A Sasnovich	6^{0}	7	6
6	(Spain) J Bouzas Maneiro	7^{7}	5	4

Second round
1	A Potapova	6	7
(Switzerland) V Golubic	4	5
A Blinkova	2	6^{5}
Q	(Germany) E Seidel	6	7^{7}
4	(Ukraine) A Kalinina	1	6	6
(Netherlands) S Lamens	6	4	4
Q	(Canada) M Stakusic	3	5
LL	A Sasnovich	6	7

Quarterfinals
1	A Potapova	6	6
Q	(Germany) E Seidel	2	3
4	(Ukraine) A Kalinina	6	4	6^{3}
LL	A Sasnovich	2	6	7^{7}

Semifinals
1	A Potapova	6	7
LL	A Sasnovich	3	5

=== Bottom half ===
First round
7	(Italy) E Cocciaretto	6	7
(Romania) I-C Begu	3	5
WC	(Romania) A Bogdan	6	6
PR	(United Kingdom) J Burrage	2	3
WC	(Romania) S Halep	1	1
(Italy) L Bronzetti	6	6
(France) V Gracheva	6	2	2
3	(United States) P Stearns	2	6	6
5	(Czech Republic) K Siniaková	6	6^{5}	6
Q	(United Kingdom) F Jones	4	7^{7}	4
Q	(Ukraine) D Snigur	5	6	4
(United States) C Dolehide	7	2	6
(Egypt) M Sherif	6	4	1
(Bulgaria) V Tomova	3	6	6
(United States) A Parks	3	3
2	(Serbia) O Danilović	6	6

Second round
7	(Italy) E Cocciaretto	6	6
WC	(Romania) A Bogdan	3	0
(Italy) L Bronzetti	6	7^{7}
3	(United States) P Stearns	2	6^{1}
5	(Czech Republic) K Siniaková	2	6	6
(United States) C Dolehide	6	1	4
(Bulgaria) V Tomova	7	7
2	(Serbia) O Danilović	5	5

Quarterfinals
7	(Italy) E Cocciaretto	1	4
(Italy) L Bronzetti	6	6
5	(Czech Republic) K Siniaková	6	7^{9}
(Bulgaria) V Tomova	3	6^{7}

Semifinals
(Italy) L Bronzetti	4
5	(Czech Republic) K Siniaková	0^{r}

== Qualifying ==
=== Seeds ===
1. (Hungary) Anna Bondár (qualified)
2. (Spain) Sara Sorribes Tormo (qualified)
3. (Romania) Anca Todoni (qualifying competition)
4. (Switzerland) Viktorija Golubic (moved to main draw)
5. (Canada) Marina Stakusic (qualified)
6. (Poland) Maja Chwalińska (qualifying competition)
7. (France) Jessika Ponchet (first round)
8. (Ukraine) Daria Snigur (qualified)
9. (Hungary) Dalma Gálfi (first round)
10. Anastasia Zakharova (qualifying competition)
11. (Germany) Ella Seidel (qualified)
12. Aliaksandra Sasnovich (qualifying competition, lucky loser)

=== Qualifiers ===
1. (Hungary) Anna Bondár
2. (Spain) Sara Sorribes Tormo
3. (Ukraine) Daria Snigur
4. (United Kingdom) Francesca Jones
5. (Canada) Marina Stakusic
6. (Germany) Ella Seidel

=== Lucky loser ===
1. Aliaksandra Sasnovich

=== Qualifying draw ===
==== First qualifier ====
First round
1	(Hungary) Anna Bondár	6	7^{7}
(Spain) Leyre Romero Gormaz	4	6^{4}
(Czech Republic) Barbora Palicová	3	4
10	Anastasia Zakharova	6	6

Qualifying competition
1	(Hungary) Anna Bondár	6	6
10	Anastasia Zakharova	4	2

==== Second qualifier ====
First round
2	(Spain) Sara Sorribes Tormo	6	6
WC	(Romania) Maria Sara Popa	0	3
(Romania) Miriam Bulgaru	3	4
12	Aliaksandra Sasnovich	6	6

Qualifying competition
2	(Spain) Sara Sorribes Tormo	6	7
12	Aliaksandra Sasnovich	4	5

==== Third qualifier ====
First round
3	(Romania) Anca Todoni	7^{9}	4	7
(Switzerland) Rebeka Masarova	6^{7}	6	5
(Switzerland) Susan Bandecchi	2	0
8	(Ukraine) Daria Snigur	6	6

Qualifying competition
3	(Romania) Anca Todoni	6^{3}	4
8	(Ukraine) Daria Snigur	7^{7}	6

==== Fourth qualifier ====
First round
Alt	(United States) Hina Inoue	6	6
WC	(Romania) Briana Szabó	1	2
(United Kingdom) Francesca Jones	1	7^{7}	6
9	(Hungary) Dalma Gálfi	6	6^{2}	3

Qualifying competition
Alt	(United States) Hina Inoue	4	3
(United Kingdom) Francesca Jones	6	6

==== Fifth qualifier ====
First round
5	(Canada) Marina Stakusic	7^{10}	6
WC	(Romania) Georgia Crăciun	6^{8}	3
(Germany) Tamara Korpatsch	6	6
7	(France) Jessika Ponchet	3	4

Qualifying competition
5	(Canada) Marina Stakusic	6	7
(Germany) Tamara Korpatsch	2	5

==== Sixth qualifier ====
First round
6	(Poland) Maja Chwalińska	6	6
WC	(Romania) Ilinca Amariei	1	1
(Serbia) Lola Radivojević	1	2
11	(Germany) Ella Seidel	6	6

Qualifying competition
6	(Poland) Maja Chwalińska	4	6^{2}
11	(Germany) Ella Seidel	6	7^{7}
