= 2021 Transylvania Open – Doubles =

Doubles
- 2021 Transylvania Open

Final
- Champions: (Romania) Irina Bara (Georgia (country)) Ekaterine Gorgodze
- Runners-up: (Serbia) Aleksandra Krunić (Netherlands) Lesley Pattinama Kerkhove
- Score: 4–6, 6–1, [11–9]

Events
| Singles | Doubles |
| Transylvania Open | · 2022 → |

This was the first edition of the tournament.

Irina Bara and Ekaterine Gorgodze won the title, defeating Aleksandra Krunić and Lesley Pattinama Kerkhove in the final, 4–6, 6–1, [11–9]. This was the first WTA Tour level title won by either Bara or Gorgodze.

== Seeds ==
1. (United States) Kaitlyn Christian / (New Zealand) Erin Routliffe (first round)
2. (Serbia) Aleksandra Krunić / (Netherlands) Lesley Pattinama Kerkhove (final)
3. (Romania) Monica Niculescu / (Romania) Elena-Gabriela Ruse (quarterfinals)
4. (Kazakhstan) Anna Danilina / (Norway) Ulrikke Eikeri (first round)

== Draw ==
=== Key ===
- Q = Qualifier
- WC = Wild card
- LL = Lucky loser
- Alt = Alternate
- SE = Special exempt
- PR = Protected ranking
- ITF = ITF entry
- JE = Junior exempt
- w/o = Walkover
- r = Retired
- d = Defaulted
- SR = Special ranking

=== Draw ===
First round
1 | (United States) K Christian (New Zealand) E Routliffe | 5 | 7 | [7]
(Russia) A Fomina-Klotz (Russia) E Yashina | 7 | 5 | [10]
(Germany) M Barthel (Germany) A-L Friedsam | 5 | 2
(Romania) I Bara (Georgia (country)) E Gorgodze | 7 | 6
3 | (Romania) M Niculescu (Romania) E-G Ruse | 6 | 6
(Russia) A Potapova (Russia) Y Sizikova | 0 | 0
(Romania) I-C Begu (Romania) A Mitu | 6 | 6
(Russia) A Anshba (Czech Republic) A Dețiuc | 4 | 3
WC | (Romania) I Amariei (Romania) B Szabó | 1 | 3
(Russia) N Dzalamidze (Slovenia) K Juvan | 6 | 6
(Ukraine) L Kichenok (Ukraine) M Kostyuk | 6 | 5 | [12]
4 | (Kazakhstan) A Danilina (Norway) U Eikeri | 0 | 7 | [10]
WC | (Romania) A Ignatik (Romania) A Prisăcariu | 6 | 6
(Russia) A Gasanova (Japan) Y Miyazaki | 1 | 4
(Romania) J Cristian (Belgium) A Van Uytvanck | 4 | 3
2 | (Serbia) A Krunić (Netherlands) L Pattinama Kerkhove | 6 | 6

Quarterfinals
(Russia) A Fomina-Klotz (Russia) E Yashina | 5 | 3
(Romania) I Bara (Georgia (country)) E Gorgodze | 7 | 6
3 | (Romania) M Niculescu (Romania) E-G Ruse | 5 | 6 | [8]
(Romania) I-C Begu (Romania) A Mitu | 7 | 0 | [10]
(Russia) N Dzalamidze (Slovenia) K Juvan | 6 | 3 | [10]
(Ukraine) L Kichenok (Ukraine) M Kostyuk | 4 | 6 | [7]
WC | (Romania) A Ignatik (Romania) A Prisăcariu | 3 | 7^{10} | [8]
2 | (Serbia) A Krunić (Netherlands) L Pattinama Kerkhove | 6 | 6^{8} | [10]

Semifinals
(Romania) I Bara (Georgia (country)) E Gorgodze | 6 | 2 | [10]
(Romania) I-C Begu (Romania) A Mitu | 3 | 6 | [7]
(Russia) N Dzalamidze (Slovenia) K Juvan | 4 | 5
2 | (Serbia) A Krunić (Netherlands) L Pattinama Kerkhove | 6 | 7

Final
(Romania) I Bara (Georgia (country)) E Gorgodze | 4 | 6 | [11]
2 | (Serbia) A Krunić (Netherlands) L Pattinama Kerkhove | 6 | 1 | [9]
