= 2025 Transylvania Open – Doubles =

Doubles
- 2025 Transylvania Open

Final
- Champions: (Belgium) Magali Kempen (Czech Republic) Anna Sisková
- Runners-up: (Romania) Jaqueline Cristian (Italy) Angelica Moratelli
- Score: 6–3, 6–1

Events
Singles	Doubles
← 2024 ·	Transylvania Open	· 2026 →

Magali Kempen and Anna Sisková won the doubles title at the 2025 Transylvania Open, defeating Jaqueline Cristian and Angelica Moratelli in the final, 6–3, 6–1. It was the first WTA Tour doubles title for both players.

Caty McNally and Asia Muhammad were the reigning champions, but McNally chose not to participate and Muhammad chose to compete in Abu Dhabi instead.

== Seeds ==
1. (Romania) Monica Niculescu / (United States) Sabrina Santamaria (first round)
2. Yana Sizikova / (Hungary) Fanny Stollár (quarterfinals)
3. (United States) Quinn Gleason / (Belgium) Kimberley Zimmermann (first round)
4. (United Kingdom) Emily Appleton / (China) Tang Qianhui (semifinals)

== Draw ==
=== Key ===
- Q = Qualifier
- WC = Wild card
- LL = Lucky loser
- Alt = Alternate
- ITF = ITF entry
- PR = Protected ranking
- SR = Special ranking
- SE = Special exempt
- JE = Junior exempt
- JR = Junior Accelerator Programme entrant
- CO = College Accelerator Programme entrant
- NG = Next Gen Accelerator Program entrant
- w/o = Walkover
- r = Retired
- d = Defaulted

=== Draw ===
First round
1	(Romania) M Niculescu (United States) S Santamaria	6	5	[3]
(Romania) J Cristian (Italy) A Moratelli	4	7	[10]
(Romania) I-C Begu (Romania) S Cîrstea	6	6
WC	(Romania) B Szabó (Romania) PM Țig	1	1
3	(United States) Q Gleason (Belgium) K Zimmermann	2	0
(Poland) K Piter; A Sasnovich	6	6
(France) E Lechemia (Egypt) M Sherif	3	3
(United Kingdom) M Brooks (Netherlands) I Haverlag	6	6
(Poland) M Chwalińska (Czech Republic) A Dețiuc	6	6
(Italy) L Bronzetti (Italy) E Cocciaretto	1	3
WC	(Romania) A Bogdan (Romania) S Halep	6^{5}	1
4	(United Kingdom) E Appleton (China) Q Tang	7^{7}	6
PR	(United States) C Corley (United Kingdom) T Moore	3	2
(Belgium) M Kempen (Czech Republic) A Sisková	6	6
(Czech Republic) J Malečková (Czech Republic) M Škoch	3	2
2	Y Sizikova (Hungary) F Stollár	6	6

Quarterfinals
(Romania) J Cristian (Italy) A Moratelli	7	6
(Romania) I-C Begu (Romania) S Cîrstea	5	4
(Poland) K Piter; A Sasnovich	6	6
(United Kingdom) M Brooks (Netherlands) I Haverlag	3	2
(Poland) M Chwalińska (Czech Republic) A Dețiuc	7^{7}	3	[8]
4	(United Kingdom) E Appleton (China) Q Tang	6^{3}	6	[10]
(Belgium) M Kempen (Czech Republic) A Sisková	6	1	[10]
2	Y Sizikova (Hungary) F Stollár	2	6	[6]

Semifinals
(Romania) J Cristian (Italy) A Moratelli	6	6
(Poland) K Piter; A Sasnovich	3	2
4	(United Kingdom) E Appleton (China) Q Tang	5	6	[6]
(Belgium) M Kempen (Czech Republic) A Sisková	7	4	[10]

Final
(Romania) J Cristian (Italy) A Moratelli	3	1
(Belgium) M Kempen (Czech Republic) A Sisková	6	6
