= 2024 Transylvania Open – Doubles =

Doubles
- 2024 Transylvania Open

Final
- Champions: (United States) Caty McNally (United States) Asia Muhammad
- Runners-up: (United Kingdom) Harriet Dart (Slovakia) Tereza Mihalíková
- Score: 6–3, 6–4

Events
| Singles | Doubles |
| ← 2023 · | Transylvania Open | · 2025 → |

Caty McNally and Asia Muhammad defeated Harriet Dart and Tereza Mihalíková in the final, 6–3, 6–4 to win the doubles tennis title at the 2024 Transylvania Open.

Jodie Burrage and Jil Teichmann were the reigning champions, but did not participate this year.

== Seeds ==
1. (Japan) Eri Hozumi / (Japan) Makoto Ninomiya (quarterfinals)
2. (Slovakia) Viktória Hrunčáková / Alexandra Panova (quarterfinals)
3. (Brazil) Ingrid Martins / Yana Sizikova (quarterfinals)
4. (Hungary) Anna Bondár / (Belgium) Kimberley Zimmermann (quarterfinals)

== Draw ==
=== Key ===
- Q = Qualifier
- WC = Wild card
- LL = Lucky loser
- Alt = Alternate
- SE = Special exempt
- PR = Protected ranking
- ITF = ITF entry
- JE = Junior exempt
- w/o = Walkover
- r = Retired
- d = Defaulted
- SR = Special ranking

=== Draw ===
First round
1 | (Japan) E Hozumi (Japan) M Ninomiya | 6 | 6
(Georgia (country)) O Kalashnikova (United Kingdom) S Murray Sharan | 4 | 1
I Khromacheva (Czech Republic) M Kolodziejová | 0 | 5
(United Kingdom) H Dart (Slovakia) T Mihalíková | 6 | 7
4 | (Hungary) A Bondár (Belgium) K Zimmermann | 6 | 6
(Italy) S Errani (Netherlands) A Rus | 2 | 1
(France) E Lechemia (United Kingdom) O Nicholls | 6 | 6
(Venezuela) A Gámiz (Czech Republic) A Sisková | 4 | 3
(United States) C McNally (United States) A Muhammad | 6 | 6
L Marozava (Poland) K Piter | 4 | 3
A Anshba (Belgium) Y Wickmayer | 4 | 2
3 | (Brazil) I Martins; Y Sizikova | 6 | 6
WC | (Romania) J Cristian (Romania) A Mitu | 6 | 6
WC | (Romania) M Gae (Romania) A Todoni | 4 | 4
(Romania) A Bogdan (Argentina) N Podoroska | 4 | 3
2 | (Slovakia) V Hrunčáková; A Panova | 6 | 6

Quarterfinals
1 | (Japan) E Hozumi (Japan) M Ninomiya | 6 | 3 | [8]
(United Kingdom) H Dart (Slovakia) T Mihalíková | 2 | 6 | [10]
4 | (Hungary) A Bondár (Belgium) K Zimmermann | 3 | 6 | [6]
(France) E Lechemia (United Kingdom) O Nicholls | 6 | 3 | [10]
(United States) C McNally (United States) A Muhammad | 2 | 7 | [10]
3 | (Brazil) I Martins; Y Sizikova | 6 | 5 | [7]
WC | (Romania) J Cristian (Romania) A Mitu | 6 | 4 | [10]
2 | (Slovakia) V Hrunčáková; A Panova | 4 | 6 | [7]

Semifinals
(United Kingdom) H Dart (Slovakia) T Mihalíková | 3 | 7^{7} | [10]
(France) E Lechemia (United Kingdom) O Nicholls | 6 | 6^{5} | [4]
(United States) C McNally (United States) A Muhammad | 6 | 6
WC | (Romania) J Cristian (Romania) A Mitu | 3 | 2

Final
(United Kingdom) H Dart (Slovakia) T Mihalíková | 3 | 4
(United States) C McNally (United States) A Muhammad | 6 | 6
