= 2024 Transylvania Open =

- Date: 5–11 February
- Edition: 4th
- Category: WTA 250
- Draw: 32S / 15Q / 16D
- Prize money: $267,082
- Surface: Hard (Indoor)
- Location: Cluj-Napoca, Romania
- Venue: BT Arena

Champions

Singles
- (Czech Republic) Karolína Plíšková

Doubles
- (United States) Caty McNally / (United States) Asia Muhammad
← 2023 ·	Transylvania Open	· 2025 →

The 2024 Transylvania Open was a women's tennis tournament played on indoor hard courts. It was the fourth edition of the Transylvania Open, and part of the WTA 250 series of the 2024 WTA Tour. It was held at the BT Arena in Cluj-Napoca, Romania, from 5 until 11 February 2024.

== Champions ==
=== Singles ===
- (Czech Republic) Karolína Plíšková def. (Romania) Ana Bogdan 6–4, 6–3

=== Doubles ===
- (United States) Caty McNally / (United States) Asia Muhammad def. (United Kingdom) Harriet Dart / (Slovakia) Tereza Mihalíková, 6–3, 6–4

== Singles main draw entrants ==
=== Seeds ===
Country	Player	Rank^{1}	Seed
NED	Arantxa Rus	43	1
GER	Tatjana Maria	44	2
	Anna Blinkova	50	3
~~FRA~~	~~Clara Burel~~	~~52~~	~~4~~
ITA	Elisabetta Cocciaretto	60	5
	Elina Avanesyan	62	6
BUL	Viktoriya Tomova	65	7
ROU	Ana Bogdan	66	8
ARG	Nadia Podoroska	67	9

- Rankings are as of 29 January 2024.

=== Other entrants ===
The following players received wildcards into the main draw:

- ~~(Romania) Miriam Bulgaru~~
- (Romania) Andreea Mitu
- (Romania) Anca Todoni

The following players received entry using a protected ranking:

- (United States) Caty McNally
- (Latvia) Anastasija Sevastova

The following players received entry from the qualifying draw:

- Erika Andreeva
- (Colombia) Emiliana Arango
- (France) Alizé Cornet
- (United Kingdom) Harriet Dart
- (Austria) Sinja Kraus
- (Switzerland) Simona Waltert

The following players received entry as lucky losers:

- (Spain) Marina Bassols Ribera
- (Hungary) Anna Bondár

=== Withdrawals ===
- (Romania) Miriam Bulgaru → replaced by (Spain) Marina Bassols Ribera
- (France) Clara Burel → replaced by (Hungary) Anna Bondár
- (Poland) Magdalena Fręch → replaced by (China) Bai Zhuoxuan
- Anna Kalinskaya → replaced by (Romania) Jaqueline Cristian
- Anastasia Pavlyuchenkova → replaced by (Germany) Laura Siegemund
- (Italy) Martina Trevisan → replaced by (Denmark) Clara Tauson

== Doubles main draw entrants ==
=== Seeds ===
Country	Player	Country	Player	Rank^{1}	Seed
JPN	Eri Hozumi	JPN	Makoto Ninomiya	90	1
SVK	Viktória Hrunčáková		Alexandra Panova	112	2
BRA	Ingrid Martins		Yana Sizikova	113	3
HUN	Anna Bondár	BEL	Kimberley Zimmermann	123	4

- Rankings are as of 29 January 2024.

=== Other entrants ===
The following pairs received wildcards into the doubles main draw:

- (Romania) Jaqueline Cristian / (Romania) Andreea Mitu
- (Romania) Mara Gae / (Romania) Anca Todoni
