= 2025 Transylvania Open =

- Date: 3–9 February
- Edition: 5th
- Category: WTA 250
- Draw: 32S / 24Q / 16D
- Surface: Hard (Indoor)
- Location: Cluj-Napoca, Romania
- Venue: BT Arena

Champions

Singles
- Anastasia Potapova

Doubles
- (Belgium) Magali Kempen / (Czech Republic) Anna Sisková
← 2024 ·	Transylvania Open	· 2026 →

The 2025 Transylvania Open was a women's tennis tournament played on indoor hard courts. It was the fifth edition of the Transylvania Open, and part of the WTA 250 series of the 2025 WTA Tour. It was held at the BT Arena in Cluj-Napoca, Romania, from 3 until 9 February 2025.

== Champions ==
=== Singles ===
- Anastasia Potapova def. (Italy) Lucia Bronzetti, 4–6, 6–1, 6–2

=== Doubles ===
- (Belgium) Magali Kempen / (Czech Republic) Anna Sisková def. (Romania) Jaqueline Cristian / (Italy) Angelica Moratelli, 6–3, 6–1

== Singles main draw entrants ==
=== Seeds ===
Country	Player	Rank^{1}	Seed
	Anastasia Potapova	33	1
SRB	Olga Danilović	41	2
USA	Peyton Stearns	46	3
UKR	Anhelina Kalinina	48	4
CZE	Kateřina Siniaková	53	5
ESP	Jéssica Bouzas Maneiro	57	6
ITA	Elisabetta Cocciaretto	59	7
ROU	Jaqueline Cristian	61	8

- Rankings are as of 27 January 2025.

=== Other entrants ===
The following players received wildcards into the main draw:

- (Romania) Ana Bogdan
- (Romania) Simona Halep
- (Romania) Elena-Gabriela Ruse

The following players received entry using a protected ranking:

- (Austria) Julia Grabher
- (United Kingdom) Jodie Burrage

The following players received entry from the qualifying draw:

- (Hungary) Anna Bondár
- (United Kingdom) Francesca Jones
- (Germany) Ella Seidel
- (Ukraine) Daria Snigur
- (Spain) Sara Sorribes Tormo
- (Canada) Marina Stakusic

The following player received entry as a lucky loser:

- Aliaksandra Sasnovich

=== Withdrawals ===
- (Germany) Laura Siegemund → replaced by Aliaksandra Sasnovich
- (Denmark) Clara Tauson → replaced by (Romania) Jaqueline Cristian

== Doubles main draw entrants ==
=== Seeds ===
Country	Player	Country	Player	Rank^{1}	Seed
ROU	Monica Niculescu	USA	Sabrina Santamaria	113	1
	Yana Sizikova	HUN	Fanny Stollár	121	2
USA	Quinn Gleason	BEL	Kimberley Zimmermann	171	3
GBR	Emily Appleton	CHN	Tang Qianhui	174	4

- Rankings are as of 27 January 2025.

=== Other entrants ===
The following pairs received wildcards into the doubles main draw:

- (Romania) Ana Bogdan / (Romania) Simona Halep
- (Romania) Briana Szabó / (Romania) Patricia Maria Țig
