= 2021 Transylvania Open – Singles =

Singles
- 2021 Transylvania Open

Final
- Champion: (Estonia) Anett Kontaveit
- Runner-up: (Romania) Simona Halep
- Score: 6–2, 6–3

Details
- Draw: 32
- Seeds: 8

Events
Singles	Doubles
Transylvania Open	· 2022 →

Anett Kontaveit defeated Simona Halep in the final, 6–2, 6–3 to win the first edition of the women's singles tennis event at the 2021 Transylvania Open. Kontaveit won the title without dropping a set. By winning the title, Kontaveit qualified for the WTA Finals, overtaking Ons Jabeur in the Race to Guadalajara, and also entered the top 10 of the WTA rankings for the first time. Her win over Halep in the final also marked her first victory over the former world No. 1.

Halep reached the final losing just 12 games. Her loss snapped a 14 match win streak on home soil.

== Seeds ==
1. (Romania) Simona Halep (final)
2. (Estonia) Anett Kontaveit (champion)
3. (United Kingdom) Emma Raducanu (quarterfinals)
4. (Switzerland) Jil Teichmann (first round)
5. (Australia) Ajla Tomljanović (second round)
6. (Ukraine) Marta Kostyuk (semifinals)
7. (Romania) Irina-Camelia Begu (first round)
8. (Ukraine) Anhelina Kalinina (quarterfinals)

== Draw ==
Key

- Q = Qualifier
- WC = Wild card
- LL = Lucky loser
- Alt = Alternate
- ITF = ITF entry
- PR = Protected ranking
- SR = Special ranking
- SE = Special exempt
- JE = Junior exempt
- JR = Junior Accelerator Programme entrant
- CO = College Accelerator Programme entrant
- NG = Next Gen Accelerator Program entrant
- w/o = Walkover
- r = Retired
- d = Defaulted

=== Finals ===
Semifinals
1	(Romania) Simona Halep	6	6
6	(Ukraine) Marta Kostyuk	0	1
(Sweden) Rebecca Peterson	3	2
2	(Estonia) Anett Kontaveit	6	6

Final
1	(Romania) Simona Halep	2	3
2	(Estonia) Anett Kontaveit	6	6

=== Top half ===
First round
1	(Romania) S Halep	6	6
(Romania) E-G Ruse	1	2
(Germany) A Petkovic	4	6	4
(Russia) V Gracheva	6	2	6
WC	(Romania) J Cristian	3	7^{10}	7^{7}
(Slovenia) K Juvan	6	6^{8}	6^{3}
(Russia) A Potapova	2	7	5
5	(Australia) A Tomljanović	6	5	7
3	(United Kingdom) E Raducanu	4	7	6
(Slovenia) P Hercog	6	5	1
(Romania) A Bogdan	7^{7}	6
PR	(Serbia) I Jorović	6^{1}	4
Q	(Hungary) A Bondár	3	5
PR	(Germany) M Barthel	6	7
(United States) B Pera	3	4
6	(Ukraine) M Kostyuk	6	6

Second round
1	(Romania) S Halep	6	6
(Russia) V Gracheva	4	2
WC	(Romania) J Cristian	7^{7}	7
5	(Australia) A Tomljanović	6^{5}	5
3	(United Kingdom) E Raducanu	6	6
(Romania) A Bogdan	3	4
PR	(Germany) M Barthel	4	4
6	(Ukraine) M Kostyuk	6	6

Quarterfinals
1	(Romania) S Halep	6	6
WC	(Romania) J Cristian	1	1
3	(United Kingdom) E Raducanu	2	1
6	(Ukraine) M Kostyuk	6	6

Semifinals
1	(Romania) S Halep	6	6
6	(Ukraine) M Kostyuk	0	1

=== Bottom half ===
First round
7	(Romania) I-C Begu	6^{2}	6	4
WC	(Romania) I Bara	7^{7}	0	6
LL	(Croatia) J Fett	1	3
(Sweden) R Peterson	6	6
Q	(Ukraine) L Tsurenko	7	6
WC	(Romania) A Prisăcariu	5	2
Q	(Russia) A Gasanova	4	6	7
4	(Switzerland) J Teichmann	6	0	5
8	(Ukraine) A Kalinina	6	6
Q	(Netherlands) L Pattinama Kerkhove	1	1
Q	(Romania) A Ignatik	7	4	4
(Germany) A-L Friedsam	5	6	6
(Montenegro) D Kovinić	4	4
(Belgium) A Van Uytvanck	6	6
Q	(Serbia) A Krunić	3	5
2	(Estonia) A Kontaveit	6	7

Second round
WC	(Romania) I Bara	0	3
(Sweden) R Peterson	6	6
Q	(Ukraine) L Tsurenko	6	7
Q	(Russia) A Gasanova	2	5
8	(Ukraine) A Kalinina	6	6
(Germany) A-L Friedsam	2	2
(Belgium) A Van Uytvanck	3	4
2	(Estonia) A Kontaveit	6	6

Quarterfinals
(Sweden) R Peterson	6	3	6
Q	(Ukraine) L Tsurenko	2	6	3
8	(Ukraine) A Kalinina	3	1
2	(Estonia) A Kontaveit	6	6

Semifinals
(Sweden) R Peterson	3	2
2	(Estonia) A Kontaveit	6	6

== Qualifying ==
=== Seeds ===
1. (Hungary) Anna Bondár (qualified)
2. (Germany) Anna-Lena Friedsam (moved to main draw)
3. (Russia) Anastasia Gasanova (qualified)
4. (Serbia) Aleksandra Krunić (qualified)
5. (Ukraine) Lesia Tsurenko (qualified)
6. (Netherlands) Lesley Pattinama Kerkhove (qualified)
7. (Georgia (country)) Ekaterine Gorgodze (first round)
8. (Slovakia) Rebecca Šramková (first round)
9. (Australia) Ellen Perez (withdrew, still playing in Tenerife)
10. (Russia) Anastasia Zakharova (first round)
11. (Croatia) Jana Fett (qualifying competition, lucky loser)
12. (Australia) Seone Mendez (qualifying competition)

=== Qualifiers ===
1. (Hungary) Anna Bondár
2. (Romania) Alexandra Ignatik
3. (Russia) Anastasia Gasanova
4. (Serbia) Aleksandra Krunić
5. (Ukraine) Lesia Tsurenko
6. (Netherlands) Lesley Pattinama Kerkhove

=== Lucky loser ===
1. (Croatia) Jana Fett

=== Qualifying draw ===
==== First qualifier ====
First round
1	(Hungary) Anna Bondár	6	6
(Russia) Angelina Gabueva	2	1
(Russia) Amina Anshba	2	7^{7}	3
11	(Croatia) Jana Fett	6	6^{3}	6

Qualifying competition
1	(Hungary) Anna Bondár	6	6
11	(Croatia) Jana Fett	2	0

==== Second qualifier ====
First round				Qualifying competition
				WC	(Romania) Vanessa Popa Teiușanu	0	1
					(Romania) Alexandra Ignatik	6	6
	(Romania) Alexandra Ignatik	6	6		(Romania) Alexandra Ignatik	6	6
8	(Slovakia) Rebecca Šramková	3	2

==== Third qualifier ====
First round				Qualifying competition
3	(Russia) Anastasia Gasanova	6	6
WC	(Romania) Ilinca Amariei	1	1
WC	(Romania) Ilinca Amariei	1	1	3	(Russia) Anastasia Gasanova	6	6
				WC	(Romania) Briana Szabó	1	0

==== Fourth qualifier ====
First round
4	(Serbia) Aleksandra Krunić	6	6
(Kazakhstan) Anna Danilina	2	0
(Japan) Yuriko Miyazaki	6	7
7	(Georgia (country)) Ekaterine Gorgodze	4	5

Qualifying competition
4	(Serbia) Aleksandra Krunić	6	6
(Japan) Yuriko Miyazaki	1	2

==== Fifth qualifier ====
First round
5	(Ukraine) Lesia Tsurenko	7^{7}	6
(Spain) Yvonne Cavallé Reimers	6^{3}	3
WC	(Romania) Andreea Roșca	7^{7}	6
10	(Russia) Anastasia Zakharova	6^{4}	3

Qualifying competition
5	(Ukraine) Lesia Tsurenko	7	6
WC	(Romania) Andreea Roșca	5	1

==== Sixth qualifier ====
First round	Qualifying competition
	6	(Netherlands) Lesley Pattinama Kerkhove	6	6
	12	(Australia) Seone Mendez	3	1
