= 2024 Transylvania Open – Singles =

Singles
- 2024 Transylvania Open

Final
- Champion: (Czech Republic) Karolína Plíšková
- Runner-up: (Romania) Ana Bogdan
- Score: 6–4, 6–3

Details
- Draw: 32 (3 WC, 6Q)
- Seeds: 8

Events
Singles	Doubles
← 2023 ·	Transylvania Open	· 2025 →

Karolína Plíšková defeated Ana Bogdan in the final, 6–4, 6–3 to win the singles tennis title at the 2024 Transylvania Open. It was Plíšková's first title since the 2020 Brisbane International, and she did not lose a set en route.

Tamara Korpatsch was the defending champion, but lost in the first round to Elina Avanesyan.

== Seeds ==
1. (Netherlands) Arantxa Rus (quarterfinals)
2. (Germany) Tatjana Maria (second round)
3. Anna Blinkova (second round)
4. (France) Clara Burel (withdrew)
5. (Italy) Elisabetta Cocciaretto (second round)
6. Elina Avanesyan (second round, retired)
7. (Bulgaria) Viktoriya Tomova (first round)
8. (Romania) Ana Bogdan (final)
9. (Argentina) Nadia Podoroska (first round)

== Draw ==
=== Key ===
- Q = Qualifier
- WC = Wild card
- LL = Lucky loser
- Alt = Alternate
- SE = Special exempt
- PR = Protected ranking
- ITF = ITF entry
- JE = Junior exempt
- w/o = Walkover
- r = Retired
- d = Defaulted
- SR = Special ranking

=== Finals ===
Semifinals
8	(Romania) Ana Bogdan	6	3	6
(Romania) Jaqueline Cristian	3	6	4
Q	(United Kingdom) Harriet Dart	3	3
(Czech Republic) Karolína Plíšková	6	6

Final
8	(Romania) Ana Bogdan	4	3
(Czech Republic) Karolína Plíšková	6	6

=== Top half ===
First round
1	(Netherlands) A Rus	7	6
(Belgium) G Minnen	5	1
Q	(France) A Cornet	7	4	6
(Belgium) Y Wickmayer	5	6	3
WC	(Romania) A Todoni	3	4
Q	E Andreeva	6	6
(United States) A Parks	5	5
8	(Romania) A Bogdan	7	7
9	(Argentina) N Podoroska	3	1
(Denmark) C Tauson	6	6
LL	(Spain) M Bassols Ribera	3	2
(Romania) J Cristian	6	6
PR	(Latvia) A Sevastova	6	6
WC	(Romania) A Mitu	2	3
(Germany) T Korpatsch	4	6^{3}
6	E Avanesyan	6	7^{7}

Second round
1	(Netherlands) A Rus	4	6	6
Q	(France) A Cornet	6	4	0
Q	E Andreeva	4	4
8	(Romania) A Bogdan	6	6
(Denmark) C Tauson	4	0
(Romania) J Cristian	6	6
PR	(Latvia) A Sevastova	6	6^{5}	2
6	E Avanesyan	2	7^{7}	0^{r}

Quarterfinals
1	(Netherlands) A Rus	6	6^{6}	6^{5}
8	(Romania) A Bogdan	3	7^{8}	7^{7}
(Romania) J Cristian	6	7
PR	(Latvia) A Sevastova	3	5

Semifinals
8	(Romania) A Bogdan	6	3	6
(Romania) J Cristian	3	6	4

=== Bottom half ===
First round
5	(Italy) E Cocciaretto	6	6
Q	(Colombia) E Arango	0	1
Q	(United Kingdom) H Dart	6	7^{7}
LL	(Hungary) A Bondár	4	6^{0}
(Germany) L Siegemund	4	4
(Spain) N Párrizas Díaz	6	6
Q	(Switzerland) S Waltert	3	0
3	A Blinkova	6	6
7	(Bulgaria) V Tomova	2	4
(Colombia) C Osorio	6	6
(Czech Republic) Ka Plíšková	6	7^{8}
Q	(Austria) S Kraus	4	6^{6}
(Italy) S Errani	6	6
PR	(United States) C McNally	2	4
(China) Z Bai	5	3
2	(Germany) T Maria	7	6

Second round
5	(Italy) E Cocciaretto	7	5	3
Q	(United Kingdom) H Dart	5	7	6
(Spain) N Párrizas Díaz	6	3	6
3	A Blinkova	1	6	4
(Colombia) C Osorio	2	1
(Czech Republic) Ka Plíšková	6	6
(Italy) S Errani	6	6
2	(Germany) T Maria	0	1

Quarterfinals
Q	(United Kingdom) H Dart	6	6
(Spain) N Párrizas Díaz	3	2
(Czech Republic) Ka Plíšková	6	6
(Italy) S Errani	2	0

Semifinals
Q	(United Kingdom) H Dart	3	3
(Czech Republic) Ka Plíšková	6	6

== Qualifying ==
=== Seeds ===
1. (United Kingdom) Harriet Dart (qualified)
2. (Spain) Marina Bassols Ribera (qualifying competition, lucky loser)
3. (France) Alizé Cornet (qualified)
4. Erika Andreeva (qualified)
5. (Colombia) Emiliana Arango (qualified)
6. (Hungary) Anna Bondár (qualifying competition, lucky loser)
7. (Spain) Nuria Párrizas Díaz (moved to main draw)
8. (Italy) Lucrezia Stefanini (qualifying competition, retired)
9. (Switzerland) Jil Teichmann (qualifying competition, retired)
10. (Switzerland) Simona Waltert (qualified)
11. (Slovakia) Viktória Hrunčáková (first round)
12. (Ukraine) Katarina Zavatska (qualifying competition)

=== Qualifiers ===
1. (United Kingdom) Harriet Dart
2. (Austria) Sinja Kraus
3. (France) Alizé Cornet
4. Erika Andreeva
5. (Colombia) Emiliana Arango
6. (Switzerland) Simona Waltert

=== Lucky losers ===
1. (Hungary) Anna Bondár
2. (Spain) Marina Bassols Ribera

=== Qualifying draw ===
==== First qualifier ====
First round
1	(United Kingdom) Harriet Dart	7^{7}	7^{7}
(Romania) Ilona Georgiana Ghioroaie	6^{3}	6^{4}
WC	(Romania) Lavinia Tanasie	1	2
12	(Ukraine) Katarina Zavatska	6	6

Qualifying competition
1	(United Kingdom) Harriet Dart	6	6
12	(Ukraine) Katarina Zavatska	0	3

==== Second qualifier ====
First round
2	(Spain) Marina Bassols Ribera	6	6
(Czech Republic) Anna Sisková	4	2
(Austria) Sinja Kraus	6	3	6
11	(Slovakia) Viktória Hrunčáková	4	6	3

Qualifying competition
2	(Spain) Marina Bassols Ribera	6^{4}	3
(Austria) Sinja Kraus	7^{7}	6

==== Third qualifier ====
First round
3	(France) Alizé Cornet	6	6
WC	(Romania) Mara Gae	2	2
(Venezuela) Andrea Gámiz	1	0
9	(Switzerland) Jil Teichmann	6	6

Qualifying competition
3	(France) Alizé Cornet	6^{4}	6	4
9	(Switzerland) Jil Teichmann	7^{7}	0	2^{r}

==== Fourth qualifier ====
First round
4	Erika Andreeva	6	6
(Italy) Nuria Brancaccio	0	0
WC	(Romania) Briana Szabó	1	1
Alt	Irina Khromacheva	6	6

Qualifying competition
4	Erika Andreeva	5	6	1
Alt	Irina Khromacheva	7	1	0^{r}

==== Fifth qualifier ====
First round
5	(Colombia) Emiliana Arango	6	6
(Romania) Maria Sara Popa	2	2
(Ukraine) Nadiya Kolb	0	0
8	(Italy) Lucrezia Stefanini	6	6

Qualifying competition
5	(Colombia) Emiliana Arango	6^{2}	6	0
8	(Italy) Lucrezia Stefanini	7^{7}	4	0^{r}

==== Sixth qualifier ====
First round
6	(Hungary) Anna Bondár	6	6
(Romania) Alexandra Cadanțu-Ignatik	2	1
WC	(Romania) Maria Teodorescu	0	0
10	(Switzerland) Simona Waltert	6	6

Qualifying competition
6	(Hungary) Anna Bondár	2	5
10	(Switzerland) Simona Waltert	6	7
