= Angelica Moratelli =

Italian tennis player

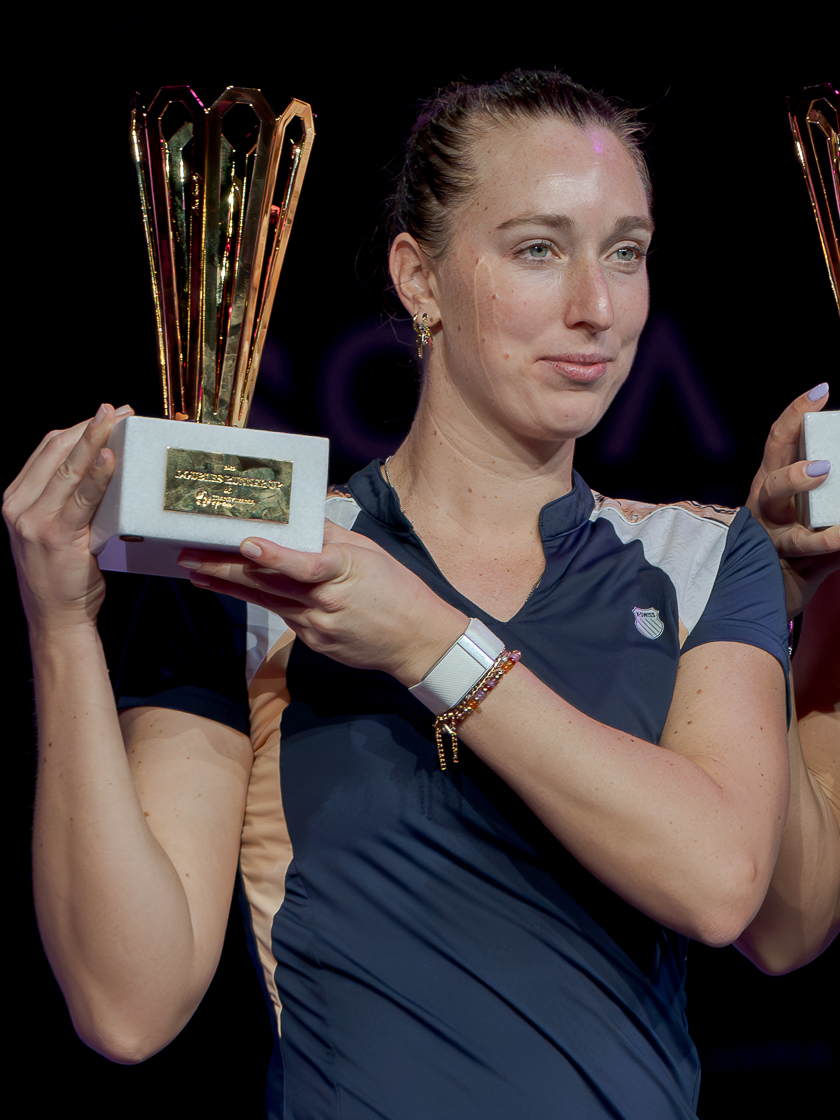
- Moratelli at the 2025 Transylvania Open doubles trophy ceremony
- Country (sports): Italy
- Born: 17 August 1994 (age 32)
- Height: 1.73 m (5 ft 8 in)
- Plays: Right (two-handed backhand)
- Coach: Marco Fioravanzo
- Prize money: $421,240

Singles
- Career record: 330–276
- Career titles: 10 ITF
- Highest ranking: No. 318 (23 September 2013)
- Current ranking: No. 1,180 (3 August 2026)

Doubles
- Career record: 366–240
- Career titles: 4 WTA 125, 33 ITF
- Highest ranking: No. 62 (9 September 2024)
- Current ranking: No. 143 (3 August 2026)

Grand Slam doubles results
- Australian Open: 1R (2024, 2025)
- French Open: 1R (2024, 2025)
- Wimbledon: 1R (2024, 2025)
- US Open: 3R (2024)
- Last updated on: 14 August 2026.

Angelica Moratelli (born 17 August 1994) is an Italian professional tennis player. She achieved her career-high singles ranking of No. 318 on 23 September 2013, and world No. 62 in doubles on 9 September 2024.

Moratelli has won four doubles titles on WTA 125 tournaments, along with ten singles and thirty-three doubles titles on the ITF Women's Circuit.

== Career ==
She made her main-draw debut on the WTA Tour at the 2016 Italian Open in the doubles draw, partnering Claudia Giovine. They won their first round match against Xu Yifan and Zheng Saisai.

In July 2023, Moratelli reached her first WTA Tour final at the Palermo Ladies Open with fellow Italian Camilla Rosatello, losing to Kimberley Zimmermann and Yana Sizikova.

In January 2024, she was selected as part of the 2024 United Cup as the WTA doubles player for team Italy.

At the 2024 US Open, on her debut, she reached the third round of a major for the first time with Jaqueline Cristian but they lost to top seeds Erin Routliffe and Gabriela Dabrowski.

Partnering Jaqueline Cristian, Moratelli was runner-up in the doubles at the 2025 Transylvania Open, losing to Magali Kempen and Anna Sisková in the final.

== WTA Tour finals ==
=== Doubles: 3 (3 runner-ups) ===
Legend WTA 500 (–) WTA 250 (0–3)	Finals by surface Hard (0–1) Clay (0–2)

Result	W–L	Date	Tournament	Tier	Surface	Partner	Opponents	Score
Loss	0–1	Jul 2023	Palermo Ladies Open, Italy	WTA 250	Clay	(Italy) Camilla Rosatello	(Russia) Yana Sizikova (Belgium) Kimberley Zimmermann	2–6, 4–6
Loss	0–2	Feb 2025	Transylvania Open, Romania	WTA 250	Hard (i)	(Romania) Jaqueline Cristian	(Belgium) Magali Kempen (Czech Republic) Anna Sisková	3–6, 1–6
Loss	0–3	May 2025	Rabat Grand Prix, Morocco	WTA 250	Clay	(Italy) Camilla Rosatello	(Australia) Maya Joint (Georgia (country)) Oksana Kalashnikova	3–6, 5–7

== WTA 125 finals ==
=== Doubles: 11 (6 titles, 5 runner-ups) ===
Result	W–L	Date	Tournament	Surface	Partner	Opponents	Score
Win	1–0	Sep 2023	Țiriac Foundation Trophy, Romania	Clay	(Italy) Camilla Rosatello	(Greece) Valentini Grammatikopoulou (Czech Republic) Anna Sisková	7–5, 6–4
Loss	1–1	Feb 2024	Puerto Vallarta Open, Mexico	Hard	(Italy) Camilla Rosatello	Iryna Shymanovich (Mexico) Renata Zarazúa	2–6, 6–7^{(1–7)}
Win	2–1	Mar 2024	Antalya Challenger, Turkey	Clay	(Italy) Camilla Rosatello	(Hungary) Tímea Babos; Vera Zvonareva	6–3, 3–6, [15–13]
Loss	2–2	Jun 2024	Bari Open, Italy	Clay	(Mexico) Renata Zarazúa	Irina Khromacheva (Kazakhstan) Anna Danilina	1–6, 3–6
Loss	2–3	Jun 2024	Internacional de Valencia, Spain	Clay	(Mexico) Renata Zarazúa	(Poland) Katarzyna Piter (Hungary) Fanny Stollár	1–6, 6–4, [8–10]
Loss	2–4	Sep 2024	Abierto Zapopan, Mexico	Hard	(United States) Sabrina Santamaria	(Poland) Katarzyna Piter (Hungary) Fanny Stollár	4–6, 5–7
Loss	2–5	May 2025	Open de Saint-Malo, France	Clay	(Georgia (country)) Oksana Kalashnikova	(United Kingdom) Maia Lumsden (Japan) Makoto Ninomiya	5–7, 2–6
Win	3–5	Jul 2026	Târgu Mureș Open, Romania	Clay	(Croatia) Lucija Ćirić Bagarić	(Spain) Yvonne Cavallé Reimers (Belgium) Lara Salden	6–3, 1–6, [11–9]
Win	4–5	Sep 2026	Ljubljana Open, Slovenia	Clay	(Croatia) Lucija Ćirić Bagarić	(France) Estelle Cascino (China) Feng Shuo	6–7^{(4–7)}, 6–4, [10–5]
Win	5–5	Sep 2026	Adana Open, Turkey	Hard	(Czech Republic) Vendula Valdmannová	(Slovenia) Dalila Jakupović (Belgium) Lara Salden	7–6^{(7–3)}, 6–4
Win	6–5	Oct 2026	Mallorca Championships, Spain	Clay	(Croatia) Lucija Ćirić Bagarić	(Spain) Yvonne Cavallé Reimers (Brazil) Laura Pigossi	2–6, 6–3, [12–10]

== ITF Circuit finals ==
=== Singles: 18 (10 titles, 8 runner-ups) ===
Legend $60,000 tournaments $25,000 tournaments (0–2) $10/15,000 tournaments (10–6)	Finals by surface Hard (2–2) Clay (8–5) Carpet (0–1)

Result	W–L	Date	Tournament	Tier	Surface	Opponent	Score
Loss	0–1	Apr 2012	ITF Heraklion, Greece	10,000	Carpet	(Croatia) Silvia Njirić	4–6, 6–7^{(4)}
Loss	0–2	Jul 2012	ITF Turin, Italy	10,000	Clay	(France) Estelle Guisard	4–6, 4–6
Win	1–2	Feb 2013	ITF Linköping, Sweden	10,000	Hard (i)	(Sweden) Malin Ulvefeldt	7–6^{(5)}, 6–1
Loss	1–3	Apr 2013	ITF Edgbaston, UK	25,000	Hard (i)	(Russia) Ekaterina Bychkova	4–6, 3–6
Win	2–3	Jan 2016	ITF Hammamet, Tunisia	10,000	Clay	(Switzerland) Karin Kennel	6–3, 6–3
Win	3–3	Feb 2016	ITF Hammamet, Tunisia	10,000	Clay	(France) Audrey Albié	7–6^{(3)}, 6–4
Win	4–3	Feb 2016	ITF Hammamet, Tunisia	10,000	Clay	(France) Margot Yerolymos	6–2, 6–2
Loss	4–4	Apr 2016	ITF Hammamet, Tunisia	10,000	Clay	(Poland) Sandra Zaniewska	6–7^{(4)}, 2–6
Win	5–4	Jun 2016	ITF Oeiras, Portugal	10,000	Clay	(Argentina) Victoria Bosio	6–4, 6–2
Loss	5–5	Feb 2018	ITF Hammamet, Tunisia	15,000	Clay	(Germany) Natalia Siedliska	6–3, 3–6, 3–6
Win	6–5	Mar 2018	ITF Le Havre, France	15,000	Clay (i)	(France) Marine Partaud	5–7, 6–1, 6–4
Win	7–5	May 2018	ITF Hammamet, Tunisia	15,000	Clay	(France) Jade Suvrijn	7–5, 7–5
Win	8–5	May 2018	ITF Hammamet, Tunisia	15,000	Clay	(Italy) Nastassja Burnett	6–3, 6–3
Win	9–5	Jun 2018	ITF Sassuolo, Italy	15,000	Clay	(Germany) Anne Schäfer	6–4, 6–3
Loss	9–6	Jan 2019	ITF Monastir, Tunisia	15,000	Hard	(Russia) Anastasiya Komardina	4–6, 1–6
Win	10–6	Dec 2021	ITF Lousada, Portugal	W15	Hard (i)	(Spain) Celia Cervino Ruiz	6–3, 1–6, 7–6^{(11)}
Loss	10–7	Feb 2022	ITF Antalya, Turkey	W15	Clay	(France) Séléna Janicijevic	3–6, 2–6
Loss	10–8	Aug 2022	ITF Agadir, Morocco	W25	Clay	(Bulgaria) Gergana Topalova	6–2, 2–6, 3–6

=== Doubles: 63 (33 titles, 30 runner-ups) ===
Legend W100,000 tournaments (2–2) W60/75 tournaments (3–4) W50 tournaments (1–0) W25/35 tournaments (8–11) W10/15 tournaments (19–13)	Finals by surface Hard (2–6) Clay (29–24) Carpet (2–0)

Result	W–L	Date	Tournament	Tier	Surface	Partner	Opponents	Score
Win	1–0	Aug 2011	Internazionali di Todi, Italy	10,000	Clay	(Italy) Federica di Sarra	(Australia) Stephanie Bengson (United States) Kirsten Flower	7–6^{(6)}, 7–5
Win	2–0	Aug 2012	ITF Pörtschach, Austria	10,000	Clay	(Serbia) Milana Spremo	(Switzerland) Lara Michel (Switzerland) Tess Sugnaux	1–6, 6–4, [10–4]
Win	3–0	Sep 2012	ITF Prague, Czech Republic	10,000	Clay	(United Kingdom) Lucy Brown	(Czech Republic) Kateřina Kramperová (Poland) Magda Linette	6–3, 5–7, [10–6]
Loss	3–1	Oct 2012	ITF Sarajevo, Bosnia & Herzegovina	15,000	Clay	(Serbia) Milana Spremo	(Czech Republic) Barbora Krejčíková (Czech Republic) Tereza Maliková	3–6, 2–6
Loss	3–2	Mar 2014	ITF Amiens, France	10,000	Clay (i)	(Italy) Anna-Giulia Remondina	(Bulgaria) Isabella Shinikova (Ukraine) Alyona Sotnikova	1–6, 4–6
Loss	3–3	Aug 2014	ITF Caslano, Switzerland	10,000	Clay	(Switzerland) Lisa Sabino	(Australia) Alexandra Nancarrow (Netherlands) Eva Wacanno	0–6, 3–6
Win	4–3	Sep 2014	ITF Pula, Italy	10,000	Clay	(Italy) Alice Balducci	(Italy) Cristiana Ferrando (Italy) Stefania Rubini	6–1, 6–4
Loss	4–4	Jan 2016	ITF Hammamet, Tunisia	10,000	Clay	(Canada) Petra Januskova	(Italy) Corinna Dentoni (Belarus) Ilona Kremen	6–7^{(2)}, 7–5, [5–10]
Loss	4–5	Jan 2016	ITF Hammamet, Tunisia	10,000	Clay	(Canada) Petra Januskova	(Italy) Anastasia Grymalska (Belarus) Ilona Kremen	6–7^{(5)}, 1–6
Win	5–5	Feb 2016	ITF Hammamet, Tunisia	10,000	Clay	(Canada) Petra Januskova	(Belgium) Deborah Kerfs (Germany) Alina Wessel	6–1, 6–2
Win	6–5	Apr 2016	ITF Hammamet, Tunisia	10,000	Clay	(Canada) Petra Januskova	(Portugal) Maria Palhoto (Ecuador) Charlotte Römer	7–6^{(7)}, 7–5
Win	7–5	Apr 2016	ITF Hammamet, Tunisia	10,000	Clay	(France) Manon Arcangioli	(Algeria) Inès Ibbou (Canada) Petra Januskova	6–3, 6–4
Loss	7–6	Aug 2016	ITF Tarvisio, Italy	10,000	Clay	(Italy) Anna-Giulia Remondina	(Italy) Chiara Quattrone (Russia) Liudmila Samsonova	6–3, 4–6, [6–10]
Win	8–6	Aug 2016	ITF Aprilia, Italy	10,000	Clay	(Italy) Giorgia Marchetti	(Italy) Deborah Chiesa (Denmark) Emilie Francati	6–1, 6–3
Loss	8–7	Sep 2016	ITF Hammamet, Tunisia	10,000	Clay	(Belarus) Sviatlana Pirazhenka	(France) Kassandra Davesne (Slovakia) Barbara Kötelesová	w/o
Win	9–7	Feb 2017	ITF Hammamet, Tunisia	15,000	Clay	(Italy) Giorgia Marchetti	(Chinese Taipei) Hsu Chieh-yu (Russia) Yana Sizikova	6–4, 6–3
Win	10–7	Feb 2017	ITF Hammamet, Tunisia	15,000	Clay	(Italy) Giorgia Marchetti	(Chinese Taipei) Hsu Chieh-yu (France) Victoria Muntean	2–6, 6–3, [10–8]
Win	11–7	Aug 2017	ITF Mrągowo, Poland	15,000	Clay	(France) Jade Suvrijn	(United Kingdom) Maia Lumsden (Ukraine) Anastasiya Shoshyna	6–4, 6–4
Win	12–7	Aug 2017	ITF Mrągowo, Poland	15,000	Clay	(France) Marine Partaud	(United States) Akiko Okuda (Dominican Republic) Kelly Williford	6–2, 6–3
Loss	12–8	Sep 2017	ITF Mrągowo, Poland	15,000	Clay	(France) Marine Partaud	(Poland) Daria Kuczer (Poland) Marta Leśniak	2–6, 3–6
Win	13–8	Sep 2017	ITF Hammamet, Tunisia	15,000	Clay	(Italy) Natasha Piludu	(Finland) Mia Eklund (United States) Amy Zhu	6–4, 6–2
Win	14–8	Nov 2017	ITF Hammamet, Tunisia	15,000	Clay	(Italy) Natasha Piludu	(Netherlands) Dominique Karregat (France) Caroline Roméo	6–2, 7–5
Win	15–8	Feb 2018	ITF Hammamet, Tunisia	15,000	Clay	(Italy) Melania Delai	(Chinese Taipei) Hsu Chieh-yu (Egypt) Sandra Samir	6–2, 6–4
Win	16–8	May 2018	ITF Hammamet, Tunisia	15,000	Clay	(Belgium) Marie Benoît	(Russia) Ulyana Ayzatulina (Germany) Julyette Steur	6–3, 6–4
Win	17–8	Jun 2018	ITF Óbidos, Portugal	25,000	Carpet	(Sweden) Linnéa Malmqvist	(Turkey) Berfu Cengiz (Australia) Sara Tomic	7–5, 2–1 ret.
Loss	17–9	Mar 2019	ITF Mâcon, France	W25	Hard (i)	(Italy) Claudia Giovine	(Netherlands) Lesley Kerkhove (Netherlands) Bibiane Schoofs	2–6, 4–6
Loss	17–10	Mar 2019	ITF Amiens, France	W15	Clay (i)	(United Kingdom) Anna Popescu	(France) Maelys Bougrat (France) Émeline Dartron	3–6, 2–6
Win	18–10	Apr 2019	ITF Tabarka, Tunisia	W15	Clay	(Czech Republic) Karolína Beránková	(United States) Sarah Lee (Belgium) Chelsea Vanhoutte	7–5, 4–6, [10–7]
Win	19–10	Jun 2019	ITF Padova, Italy	W25	Clay	(Romania) Cristina Dinu	(Brazil) Carolina Alves (Brazil) Gabriela Cé	7–6^{(7)}, 3–6, [10–8]
Win	20–10	Sep 2019	ITF Trieste, Italy	W25	Clay	(Romania) Cristina Dinu	(Hungary) Dalma Gálfi (Greece) Valentini Grammatikopoulou	4–6, 6–1, [10–8]
Win	21–10	Jan 2020	ITF Stuttgart, Germany	W15	Hard (i)	(Russia) Alena Fomina	(Czech Republic) Karolína Beránková (Portugal) Francisca Jorge	7–5, 6–2
Loss	21–11	Aug 2020	ITF Cordenons, Italy	W15	Clay	(Slovenia) Nika Radišić	(Italy) Martina Colmegna (Italy) Federica di Sarra	2–6, 6–7^{(7)}
Loss	21–12	Oct 2020	ITF Lousada, Portugal	W15	Hard (i)	(Italy) Claudia Giovine	(Switzerland) Susan Bandecchi (Belgium) Lara Salden	4–6, 3–6
Loss	21–13	Jul 2021	Telavi Open, Georgia	W25	Clay	(Argentina) Victoria Bosio	(North Macedonia) Lina Gjorcheska (Ukraine) Valeriya Strakhova	6–4, 4–6, [5–10]
Loss	21–14	Jul 2021	Telavi Open 2, Georgia	W25	Clay	(Argentina) Victoria Bosio	(Netherlands) Eva Vedder (Netherlands) Stéphanie Visscher	6–3, 4–6, [11–13]
Loss	21–15	Aug 2021	ITF Pescara, Italy	W25	Clay	(Argentina) Victoria Bosio	(Romania) Cristina Dinu (Romania) Ioana Loredana Roșca	2–6, 7–5, [3–10]
Loss	21–16	Sep 2021	ITF Leiria, Portugal	W25	Hard	(Spain) Celia Cerviño Ruiz	(Brazil) Carolina Alves (Russia) Anastasia Tikhonova	4–6, 4–6
Loss	21–17	Feb 2022	ITF Antalya, Turkey	W15	Clay	(Hungary) Amarissa Kiara Tóth	(Croatia) Mariana Dražić (Germany) Katharina Hobgarski	5–7, 4–6
Loss	21–18	Mar 2022	ITF Palma Nova, Spain	W15	Clay	(Italy) Aurora Zantedeschi	(Slovenia) Veronika Erjavec (Slovenia) Nina Potočnik	5–7, 3–6
Win	22–18	Mar 2022	ITF Palma Nova, Spain	W15	Clay	(Italy) Aurora Zantedeschi	(Romania) Bianca Bărbulescu (Romania) Briana Szabó	7–5, 6–2
Win	23–18	May 2022	ITF Pula, Italy	W25	Clay	(Italy) Camilla Rosatello	(Portugal) Matilde Jorge (Portugal) Francisca Jorge	6–4, 7–5
Loss	23–19	Jul 2022	ITF Perugia, Italy	W25	Clay	(Spain) Ángela Fita Boluda	(Slovenia) Veronika Erjavec (Ukraine) Valeriya Strakhova	w/o
Win	24–19	Jul 2022	Internazionali di Cordenons, Italy	W60	Clay	(Netherlands) Eva Vedder	(Colombia) Yuliana Lizarazo (Italy) Aurora Zantedeschi	6–3, 6–2
Win	25–19	Aug 2022	ITF Agadir, Morocco	W25	Clay	(Italy) Aurora Zantedeschi	(Sweden) Jacqueline Cabaj Awad (Italy) Martina Colmegna	6–2, 4–6, [10–8]
Win	26–19	Sep 2022	ITF Pula, Italy	W25	Clay	(Italy) Camilla Rosatello	(Italy) Jennifer Ruggeri (Bolivia) Noelia Zeballos	6–4, 6–4
Loss	26–20	Oct 2022	ITF Pula, Italy	W25	Clay	(Italy) Lisa Pigato	(Russia) Amina Anshba (Romania) Oana Georgeta Simion	3–6, 1–6
Win	27–20	Oct 2022	ITF Pula, Italy	W25	Clay	(Italy) Camilla Rosatello	(United States) Jessie Aney (Greece) Sapfo Sakellaridi	6–7^{(4)}, 7–5, [10–5]
Loss	27–21	Oct 2022	ITF Pula, Italy	W25	Clay	(Italy) Nuria Brancaccio	(United States) Jessie Aney (Greece) Sapfo Sakellaridi	6–7^{(2)}, 5–7
Loss	27–22	Dec 2022	ITF Sëlva, Italy	W25	Hard (i)	(Switzerland) Xenia Knoll	(Serbia) Katarina Jokić (United States) Taylor Ng	3–6, 2–6
Loss	27–23	Apr 2023	ITF Pula, Italy	W25	Clay	(Netherlands) Arantxa Rus	(Poland) Weronika Falkowska (Greece) Valentini Grammatikopoulou	1–6, 1–6
Win	28–23	Jun 2023	Roma Cup, Italy	W60	Clay	(Italy) Camilla Rosatello	(Romania) Oana Gavrilă (Greece) Sapfo Sakellaridi	3–6, 6–0, [10–7]
Win	29–23	Aug 2023	Internazionali di Cordenons, Italy	W60	Clay	(Italy) Camilla Rosatello	(Netherlands) Isabelle Haverlag (Netherlands) Eva Vedder	0–6, 6–2, [10–5]
Loss	29–24	Aug 2023	Přerov Cup, Czech Republic	W60	Clay	(Italy) Camilla Rosatello	(Czech Republic) Anna Sisková (Greece) Sapfo Sakellaridi	2–6, 3–6
Loss	29–25	Sep 2023	ITF Prague Open, Czech Republic	W60	Clay	(Italy) Camilla Rosatello	(Poland) Martyna Kubka (Kazakhstan) Zhibek Kulambayeva	6–7^{(3)}, 4–6
Loss	29–26	Oct 2023	ITF Pula, Italy	W25	Clay	(Italy) Nuria Brancaccio	(Slovenia) Veronika Erjavec (Lithuania) Justina Mikulskytė	6–7^{(0)}, 0–6
Win	30–26	Oct 2023	ITF Les Franqueses del Vallès, Spain	W100	Hard	(Italy) Camilla Rosatello	(China) Gao Xinyu (Latvia) Darja Semeņistaja	4–6, 7–5, [10–6]
Win	31–26	Nov 2023	ITF Solarino, Italy	W25	Carpet	(Italy) Lisa Pigato	(Georgia (country)) Sofia Shapatava (United Kingdom) Emily Webley-Smith	6–3, 6–4
Loss	31–27	Apr 2024	Zaragoza Open, Spain	W100	Clay	(Italy) Camilla Rosatello	(Czech Republic) Miriam Kolodziejová (Czech Republic) Anna Sisková	2–6, 3–6
Loss	31–28	Aug 2024	ITF Maspalomas, Spain	W100	Clay	(United States) Sabrina Santamaria	(Poland) Katarzyna Piter (Hungary) Fanny Stollár	4–6, 2–6
Loss	31–29	Nov 2025	Kyotec Open, Luxembourg	W75	Hard (i)	(Spain) Yvonne Cavallé Reimers	(United Kingdom) Emily Appleton (Belgium) Magali Kempen	3–6, 6–3, [6–10]
Loss	31–30	Feb 2026	Porto Indoor, Portugal	W75	Hard (i)	(Italy) Camilla Rosatello	(Italy) Deborah Chiesa (Switzerland) Naïma Karamoko	2–6, 2–6
Win	32–30	May 2026	ITF Portorož, Slovenia	W50	Clay	Anastasia Tikhonova	Alevtina Ibragimova (Hungary) Amarissa Tóth	3–6, 6–3, [10–4]
Win	33–30	Jun 2026	Zagreb Ladies Open, Croatia	W100	Clay	(Croatia) Lucija Ćirić Bagarić	(Bulgaria) Rositsa Dencheva; Ekaterina Kazionova	7–5, 6–3
