= Transylvania Open =

Tennis event located in Cluj-Napoca, Romania

- 2026 Transylvania Open
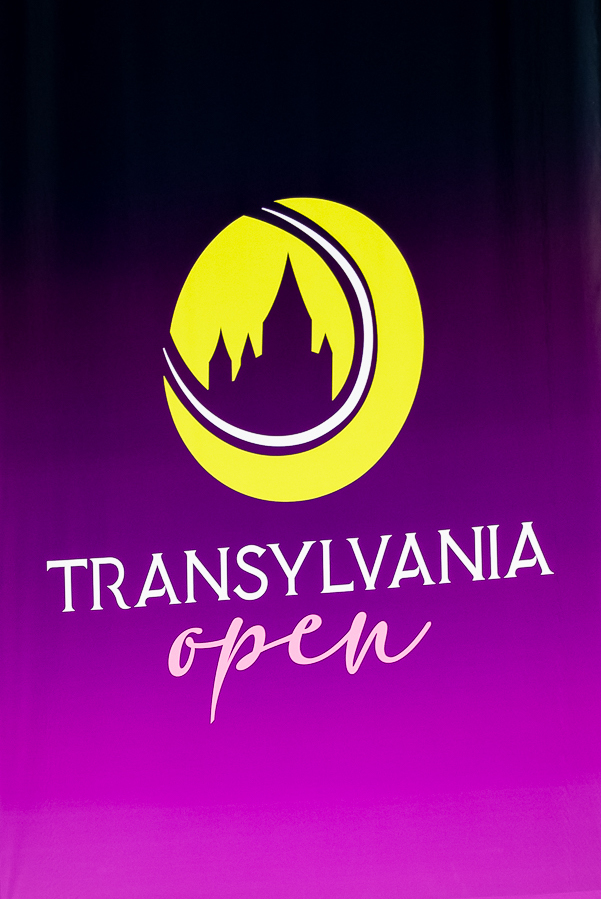

WTA Tour
- Founded: 2021
- Location: Cluj-Napoca; Romania
- Venue: BTarena
- Category: WTA 250
- Surface: Hard (Indoor)
- Draw: 32S / 16Q / 16D
- Prize money: US$283,347
- Website: Official website

Current champions (2026)
- Singles: (Romania) Sorana Cîrstea
- Doubles: (Uzbekistan) Kamilla Rakhimova (Spain) Sara Sorribes Tormo

The Transylvania Open is a WTA 250 tournament held in Cluj-Napoca, Romania. The first edition was played in October 2021.

== Past finals ==
=== Singles ===
Year	Champion	Runner-up	Score
2021	(Estonia) Anett Kontaveit	(Romania) Simona Halep	6–2, 6–3
2022	Anna Blinkova	(Italy) Jasmine Paolini	6–2, 3–6, 6–2
2023	(Germany) Tamara Korpatsch	(Romania) Elena-Gabriela Ruse	6–3, 6–4
2024	(Czech Republic) Karolína Plíšková	(Romania) Ana Bogdan	6–4, 6–3
2025	Anastasia Potapova	(Italy) Lucia Bronzetti	4–6, 6–1, 6–2
2026	(Romania) Sorana Cîrstea	(United Kingdom) Emma Raducanu	6–0, 6–2

=== Doubles ===
Year	Champions	Runners-up	Score
2021	(Romania) Irina Bara (Georgia (country)) Ekaterine Gorgodze	(Serbia) Aleksandra Krunić (Netherlands) Lesley Pattinama Kerkhove	4–6, 6–1, [11–9]
2022	(Belgium) Kirsten Flipkens (Germany) Laura Siegemund	Kamilla Rakhimova; Yana Sizikova	6–3, 7–5
2023	(United Kingdom) Jodie Burrage (Switzerland) Jil Teichmann	(France) Léolia Jeanjean (Ukraine) Valeriya Strakhova	6–1, 6–4
2024	(United States) Caty McNally (United States) Asia Muhammad	(United Kingdom) Harriet Dart (Slovakia) Tereza Mihalíková	6–3, 6–4
2025	(Belgium) Magali Kempen (Czech Republic) Anna Sisková	(Romania) Jaqueline Cristian (Italy) Angelica Moratelli	6–3, 6–1
2026	(Uzbekistan) Kamilla Rakhimova (Spain) Sara Sorribes Tormo	(China) Wang Xinyu (China) Zheng Saisai	7–6^{(9–7)}, 6–3

== See also ==
- Romanian Open
- Bucharest Open
- Winners Open
- List of tennis tournaments
