= Jaqueline Cristian =

Romanian tennis player (born 1998)

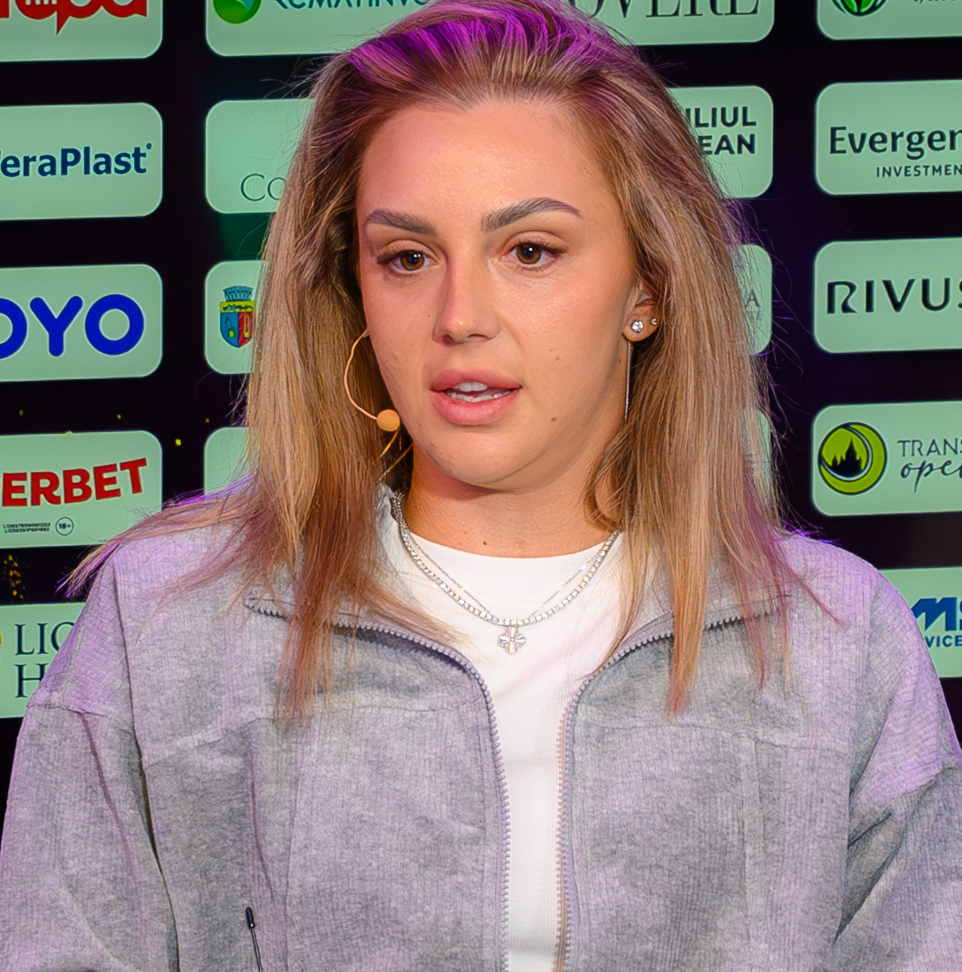
- Cristian at the 2026 Transylvania Open draw ceremony
- Full name: Jaqueline Adina Cristian
- Country (sports): Romania
- Born: 5 June 1998 (age 28) Bucharest, Romania
- Height: 1.82 m (6 ft 0 in)
- Turned pro: 2012
- Plays: Right (two-handed backhand)
- Coach: Javier Martí
- Prize money: $3,781,005

Singles
- Career record: 375–274
- Career titles: 1 WTA 125
- Highest ranking: No. 28 (4 May 2026)
- Current ranking: No. 60 (28 September 2026)

Grand Slam singles results
- Australian Open: 3R (2025)
- French Open: 3R (2025)
- Wimbledon: 2R (2023)
- US Open: 3R (2025)

Other tournaments
- Olympic Games: 2R (2024)

Doubles
- Career record: 144–112
- Career titles: 10 ITF
- Highest ranking: No. 93 (23 February 2026)
- Current ranking: No. 118 (28 September 2026)

Grand Slam doubles results
- Australian Open: 3R (2022)
- French Open: 1R (2024, 2025, 2026)
- Wimbledon: 2R (2023)
- US Open: 3R (2024)

Other doubles tournaments
- Olympic Games: 1R (2024)

Team competitions
- Fed Cup: 8–4
- Last updated on: 28 September 2026.

Jaqueline Adina Cristian (born 5 June 1998) is a Romanian professional tennis player. She has career-high WTA rankings of No. 28 in singles, achieved on 4 May 2026, and No. 93 in doubles, reached on 23 February 2026. Cristian has won one WTA 125 title, along with 14 singles titles and ten doubles titles on the ITF Women's Circuit.

== Career ==
=== 2015–20: WTA Tour debut ===
Cristian made her WTA Tour main-draw debut at the 2015 Bucharest Open in the doubles event, partnering Elena-Gabriela Ruse.

She reached her maiden WTA Tour final at the 2019 Bucharest Open in the doubles event, again partnering Ruse, losing to fourth seeds Viktória Kužmová and Kristýna Plíšková.

=== 2021: Breakthrough and top 75 debut ===
She reached the quarterfinals of a WTA Tour event for the first time as a qualifier at the WTA 500 St. Petersburg Ladies' Trophy where she lost to fourth seed Svetlana Kuznetsova.

In September, she reached her first semifinal at a WTA Tour-level at the Astana Open. She reached the quarterfinals of the first edition of the Transylvania Open as a wildcard before she lost to top seed Simona Halep. She began a tradition of wearing a Dracula-like cape on court before or after her matches there. She reached the top 100 on 8 November 2021.

At the Linz Open, she reached the final as a lucky loser following Simona Halep's withdrawal due to injury from the semifinal but lost to Alison Riske in three sets. As a result, she moved 29 positions up in the rankings to No. 71 on 15 November 2021, having been ranked world No. 100 at the beginning of the tournament.

=== 2022: Major & WTA 1000 debuts & first wins, hiatus ===
Cristian made her Grand Slam tournament debut at the Australian Open where she won her first-round match against Greet Minnen, before losing to Madison Keys. As a result, she reached a new career-high ranking of No. 58, on 31 January 2022.

She made her WTA 1000 debut at the Qatar Ladies Open as a lucky loser and defeated 11th seed Elena Rybakina for her first win at this level. Having won the first set, she retired in her second round match against Daria Kasatkina.

She returned after six months of hiatus to make her debut at the US Open, where she lost to second seed Anett Kontaveit.

=== 2023–24: Wimbledon debut, WTA 1000 third rounds & top-10 win ===
Cristian made her Wimbledon debut at the 2023 Championships, defeating Lucia Bronzetti in the first round, before losing to 13th seed Beatriz Haddad Maia.

A run which included a win over top seed Marie Bouzková, saw Cristian make it through to the semifinals at the 2023 Prague Open, where lost to eventual champion Nao Hibino.

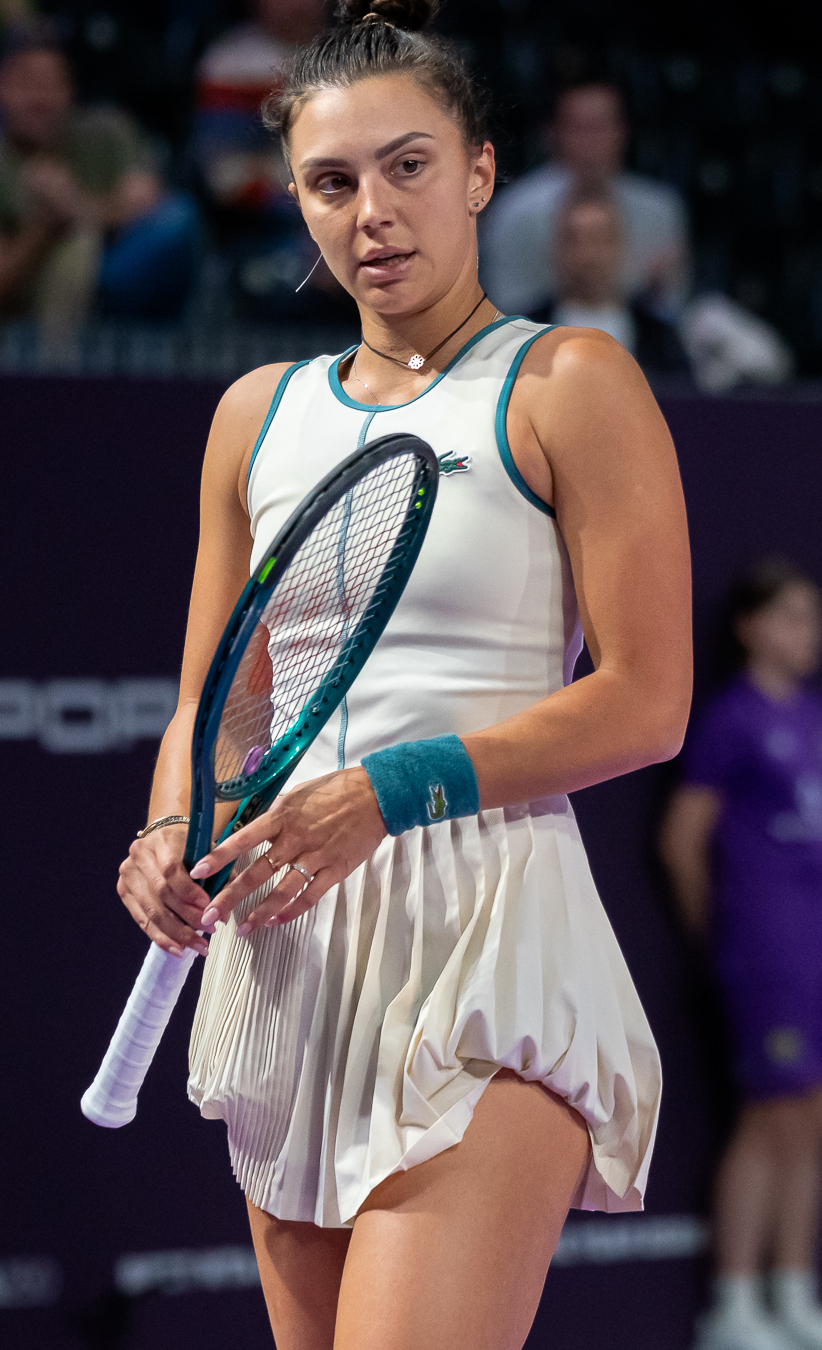
Cristian at the 2024 Transylvania Open

At the end of January 2024, she entered the WTA 500 Linz Open as a lucky loser and defeated Nadia Podoroska, before losing to qualifier Jodie Burrage in the second round.

At the Transylvania Open, she reached the semifinals for the first time in her career at the tournament. She lost to eighth seed Ana Bogdan in three sets.

At the Charleston Open, Cristian defeated three Americans- Sachia Vickery, eighth seed Madison Keys, and 10th seed Emma Navarro- to reach the quarterfinals, losing there to fourth seed Daria Kasatkina.

She reached the third round at the WTA 1000 Madrid Open by defeating Magdalena Fręch and 22nd seed Barbora Krejčíková, before losing to 13th seed Danielle Collins. Despite the loss, she moved up in the top 70 in the rankings. At the next WTA 1000, the Italian Open, she entered the main-draw as a lucky loser replacing Barbora Krejčíková directly into the second round and defeated Elina Avanesyan to reach again the third round, before losing to third seed Coco Gauff.

At the Palermo Ladies Open, Cristian defeated Lucia Bronzetti to make it through to the quarterfinals where she lost to top seed and eventual champion, Zheng Qinwen. The following week, she also reached the quarterfinals at the Iași Open but went out to Elina Avanesyan.

In September 2024, at the WTA 1000 China Open, Cristian reached the third round for the third time at this level with her first career upset over a top-10 player, reigning Wimbledon champion Barbora Krejčíková, in three sets, saving four match points. She was eliminated from the tournament by another Czech player, Karolína Muchová.

The following month, Cristian defeated Camila Osorio in three sets to make it into the second round at the Wuhan Open, where she lost to fifth seed Zheng Qinwen. She then lost in qualifying for the Ningbo Open but was advanced into the last 16 as a lucky loser, only to be beaten by Karolina Muchová. Cristian then moved on to the Guangzhou Open, where she defeated Viktorija Golubic in three sets in the first round, but lost to Lucia Bronzetti in the round of 16.

=== 2025: Major third round & WTA 125 title, Morocco final, top 50 ===
Cristian started her 2025 season at the Auckland Open, where she advanced to the second round after her opening opponent, Yuliia Starodubtseva, retired due to injury. She lost in the second round to top seed Madison Keys.

At the Australian Open, Cristian reached the third round of a major tournament for the first time in her career, defeating lucky loser Petra Martić and Lucia Bronzetti. She lost her next match to lucky loser Eva Lys, in three sets. At the same tournament, she also reached the second round in doubles with partner Camilla Rosatello.

Partnering Angelica Moratelli, she finished runner-up in the doubles of the Transylvania Open in February, losing in the final to Magali Kempen and Anna Sisková.

In March, Cristian won the title at the WTA 125 Puerto Vallarta Open, defeating wildcard entrant Linda Fruhvirtová in the final.

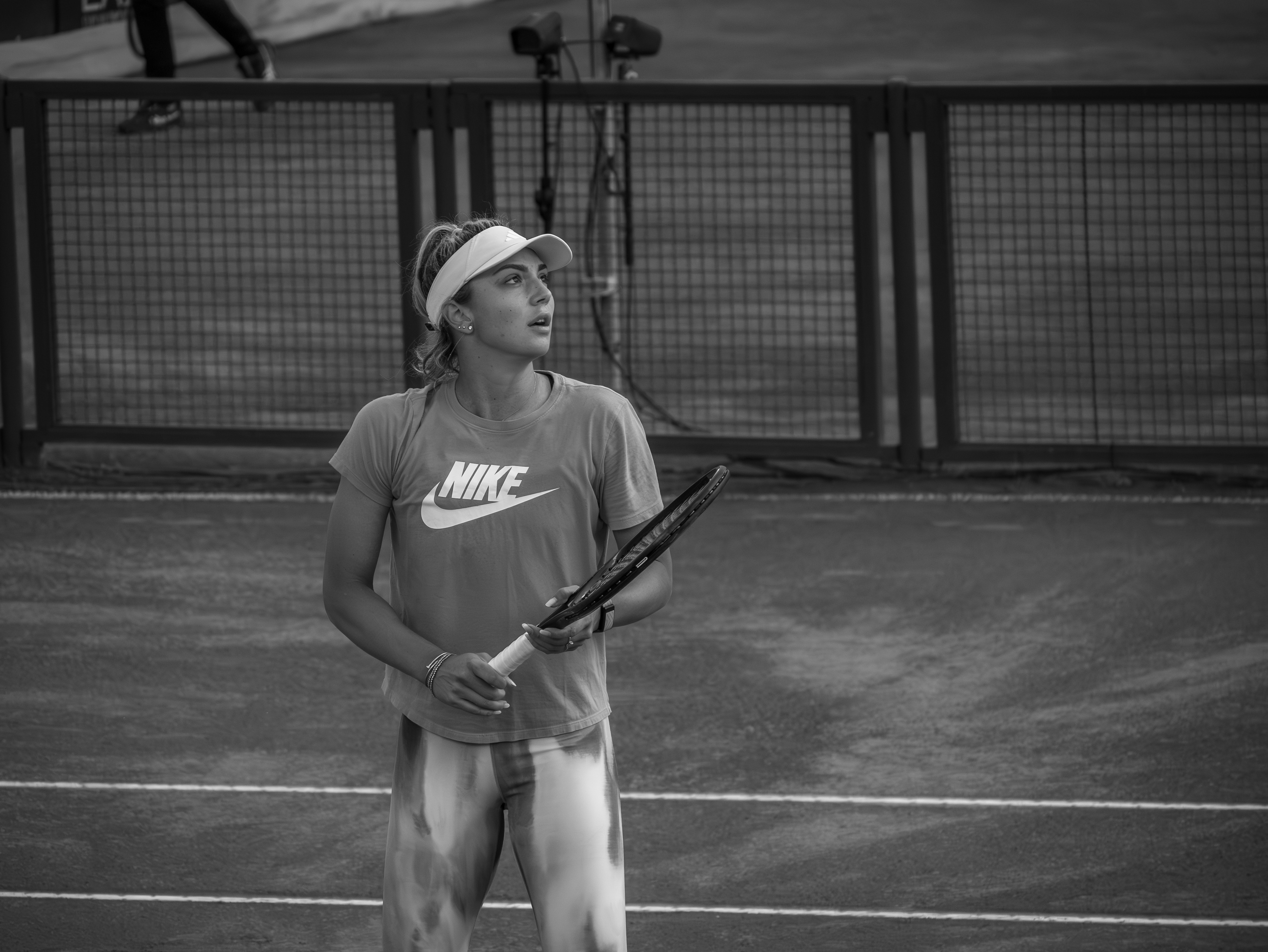
Cristian at the 2025 Italian Open

At the Italian Open in May, she recorded wins over Alycia Parks and 23rd seed Yulia Putintseva to make it into the third round, where she lost to 13th seed Diana Shnaider. Later that month at the Morocco Open, Cristian reached the final by defeating wildcard entrant Yelyzaveta Kotliar, Aliona Bolsova another wildcard entrant, Anastasija Sevastova, and second seed Camila Osorio. She lost the championship match to Maya Joint, in straight sets.

Cristian defeated Kimberly Birrell and qualifier Sára Bejlek to reach the third round at the French Open, at which point her run was ended by fifth seed and defending champion, Iga Świątek. Following Roland Garros, Cristian made her top-50 debut on 9 June, at world No. 49.

Seeded second at the Iași Open in July, she overcame qualifier Daria Lodikova, Jana Fett, and Panna Udvardy to make it through to the semifinals, where she lost to seventh seed Irina-Camelia Begu.

Moving onto the North American hardcourt swing, Cristian defeated wildcard entrant Marina Stakusic and 20th seed Linda Nosková to reach the third round at the Canadian Open, at which point she lost to ninth seed Elena Rybakina. At the US Open, she overcame Danielle Collins and Ashlyn Krueger to make it through to the third round, losing to eighth seed Amanda Anisimova, in three sets.

In October at the Ningbo Open, Cristian defeated qualifier Elisabetta Cocciaretto and eighth seed Jessica Bouzas Maneiro to reach the quarterfinals. She progressed to the semifinals when her last eight opponent, top seed Naomi Osaka, withdrew before their match due to injury. Cristian lost in the last four to qualifier Tereza Valentová in three sets.

=== 2026: WTA 1000 fourth round, knee surgery ===
Cristian qualified for the main-draw at the Adelaide International and then recorded wins over fourth seed Ekaterina Alexandrova and Daria Kasatkina to make it into the quarterfinals, at which point she lost to wildcard entrant Kimberly Birrell in a match lasting more than three hours.

In March at the Miami Open, she received a bye due to being seeded, and then defeated Peyton Stearns and 11th seed Ekaterina Alexandrova to reach the fourth round of a WTA 1000 tournament for the first time, before she lost to fifth seed Jessica Pegula, in straight sets.

At the Strasbourg Open, Cristian overcame qualifier McCartney Kessler, fourth seed Clara Tauson and qualifier Daria Kasatkina to make it through to the semifinals, at which point she lost to top seed Victoria Mboko, in three sets.

On 1 September, having not played since losing to 16th seed Iva Jovic in the first round at Wimbledon and then undergoing surgery on a knee injury, Cristian announced she was ending her season early, writing on social media that she did not want to rush her comeback and was focusing on being fully fit for 2027.

== Performance timelines ==
Key
W	F	SF	QF	#R	RR	Q#	P#	DNQ	A	Z#	PO	G	S	B	NMS	NTI	P	NH

(W) winner; (F) finalist; (SF) semifinalist; (QF) quarterfinalist; (#R) rounds 4, 3, 2, 1; (RR) round-robin stage; (Q#) qualification round; (P#) preliminary round; (DNQ) did not qualify; (A) absent; (Z#) Davis/Fed Cup Zonal Group (with number indication) or (PO) play-off; (G) gold, (S) silver or (B) bronze Olympic/Paralympic medal; (NMS) not a Masters tournament; (NTI) not a Tier I tournament; (P) postponed; (NH) not held; (SR) strike rate (events won / competed); (W–L) win–loss record.
To avoid confusion and double counting, these charts are updated at the conclusion of a tournament or when the player's participation has ended.

Only main-draw results in WTA Tour, Grand Slam tournaments, Billie Jean King Cup, United Cup, Hopman Cup and Olympic Games are included in win–loss records.

=== Singles ===
Current through the 2026 Wimbledon Championships.

Tournament	2017	2018	2019	2020	2021	2022	2023	2024	2025	2026	SR	W–L	Win %
Grand Slam tournaments
Australian Open	A	A	A	Q1	Q1	2R	1R	1R	3R	1R	0 / 5	3–5	38%
French Open	A	A	A	Q2	Q3	A	Q1	1R	3R	1R	0 / 3	2–3	40%
Wimbledon	A	Q1	A	NH	Q1	A	2R	1R	1R	1R	0 / 4	1–4	20%
US Open	A	Q1	Q1	A	Q3	1R	Q1	1R	3R	A	0 / 3	2–3	40%
Win–loss	0–0	0–0	0–0	0–0	0–0	1–2	1–2	0–4	6–4	0–3	0 / 15	8–15	35%
National representation
Billie Jean King Cup (Note: until 2020 known as Fed Cup)	A	A	A	QR (Note: Edition was split into the two years due to COVID-19.)		QR	QR	1R	A		0 / 1	4–3	57%
WTA 1000 tournaments
Qatar Open	NTI	A	NTI	A	NTI	2R	NTI	A	A	1R	0 / 2	1–2	33%
Dubai Championships	A	NTI	A	NTI	Q1	NTI	A	Q1	Q2	3R	0 / 1	2–1	67%
Indian Wells	A	A	A	A	A	A	A	Q1	3R	3R	0 / 2	4–2	67%
Miami Open	Q1	A	A	NH	A	A	A	1R	A	4R	0 / 2	2–2	50%
Madrid Open	A	A	A	NH	Q1	A	2R	3R	1R	3R	0 / 4	4–4	50%
Italian Open	A	A	A	A	A	A	A	3R	3R	2R	0 / 3	4-3	57%
Canadian Open	A	A	A	NH	A	A	A	A	3R	A	0 / 1	2–1	67%
Cincinnati Open	A	A	A	A	A	A	A	A	1R	A	0 / 1	0–1	0%
China Open	A	A	A	NH			A	3R	1R		0 / 2	2–2	50%
Wuhan Open	A	A	A	NH				2R	2R		0 / 2	2–2	50%
Win–loss	0–0	0–0	0–0	0–0	0–0	1–1	1–1	5–4	7–7	7–6	0 / 19	21–19	53%
Career statistics
	2017	2018	2019	2020	2021	2022	2023	2024	2025	2026	SR	W–L	Win %
Tournaments	1	0	2	1	8	10	9	21	6	14	Career total: 71		
Titles	0	0	0	0	0	0	0	0	0	0	Career total: 0		
Finals	0	0	0	0	1	0	0	0	0	0	Career total: 1		
Hard win–loss	0–0	0–0	0–1	2–1	11–5	4–10	7–6	8–12	6–5	9–8	0 / 48	47–48	49%
Clay win–loss	1–1	0–0	1–1	0–0	3–3	0–0	1–1	7–5	1–1	5–6	0 / 18	19–18	49%
Grass win–loss	0–0	0–0	0–0	0–0	0–0	0–0	1–2	0–2	0–2		0 / 6	1–6	14%
Overall win–loss	1–1	0–0	1–2	2–1	14–8	4–10	9–9	15–19	7–8	14–14	0 / 72	67–72	48%
Year-end ranking (Note: 2013: WTA ranking-1053, 2014: WTA ranking-1244, 2015: WTA ranking-827, 2016: WTA ranking-363.)	254	284	205	167	71	148	98	73	39		$3,781,005		

=== Doubles ===
Current through the 2024 WTA Tour.

	2015	2016	2017	2018	2019	2020	2021	2022	2023	2024	SR	W–L	Win %
Grand Slam tournaments
Australian Open	A	A	A	A	A	A	A	3R	1R	A	0 / 2	2–2	50%
French Open	A	A	A	A	A	A	A	A	A	1R	0 / 1	0–1	0%
Wimbledon	A	A	A	A	A	NH	A	A	2R	1R	0 / 2	1–2	33%
US Open	A	A	A	A	A	A	A	A	A	3R	0 / 1	2–1	67%
Win–loss	0–0	0–0	0–0	0–0	0–0	0–0	0–0	2–1	1–2	2–3	0 / 6	5–6	45%
National representation
Billie Jean King Cup	A	A	A	A	A	QR		QR	QR		0 / 0	1–1	50%
WTA 1000 tournaments
Qatar Open	NTI	A	NTI	A	NTI	A	NTI	2R (Note: Withdrew during the tournament. Not counted as a loss.)	NTI		0 / 1	1–0	100%
Dubai Championships	A	NTI	A	NTI	A	NTI	A	NTI	A	Q1	0 / 0	0–0	0%
Career statistics
Tournaments	1	0	1	2	1	0 (Note: During the season, she did not play in the main draw of any tour-level tournaments. However, she played at the Billie Jean King Cup, which is not counted as a played tournament but matches count.)	4	5	4		Career total: 18		
Titles	0	0	0	0	0	0	0	0	0		Career total: 0		
Finals	0	0	0	0	1	0	0	0	0		Career total: 1		
Overall win–loss	0–1	0–0	1–1	3–2	3–1	0–1	1–4	4–4	1–4		0 / 18	13–18	42%
Year-end ranking (Note: 2013: WTA ranking-913, 2014: WTA ranking-1028.)	710	342	309	190	206	176	339	191	240	219			

== WTA Tour finals ==
=== Singles: 2 (2 runner-ups) ===
Legend WTA 250 (0–2)	Finals by surface Hard (0–1) Clay (0–1)	Finals by setting Outdoor (0–1) Indoor (0–1)

Result	W–L	Date	Tournament	Tier	Surface	Opponent	Score
Loss	0–1	Nov 2021	Ladies Linz, Austria	WTA 250	Hard (i)	(United States) Alison Riske	6–2, 2–6, 5–7
Loss	0–2	May 2025	Rabat Grand Prix, Morocco	WTA 250	Clay	(Australia) Maya Joint	3–6, 2–6

=== Doubles: 2 (2 runner-ups) ===
Legend International / WTA 250 (0–2)	Finals by surface Hard (0–1) Clay (0–1)	Finals by setting Outdoor (0–1) Indoor (0–1)

Result	W–L	Date	Tournament	Tier	Surface	Partner	Opponents	Score
Loss	0–1	Jul 2019	Bucharest Open, Romania	International	Clay	(Romania) Elena-Gabriela Ruse	(Slovakia) Viktória Kužmová (Czech Republic) Kristýna Plíšková	4–6, 6–7^{(3–7)}
Loss	0–2	Feb 2025	Transylvania Open, Romania	WTA 250	Hard (i)	(Italy) Angelica Moratelli	(Belgium) Magali Kempen (Czech Republic) Anna Sisková	3–6, 1–6

== WTA 125 finals ==
=== Singles: 1 (title) ===
Result	Date	Tournament	Surface	Opponent	Score
Win	Mar 2025	Puerto Vallarta Open, Mexico	Hard	(Czech Republic) Linda Fruhvirtová	7–5, 6–4

== ITF Circuit finals ==
=== Singles: 20 (14 titles, 6 runner-ups) ===
Legend $100,000 tournaments (0–1) $80,000 tournaments (1–0) $60,000 tournaments (2–1) $25,000 tournaments (5–4) $10,000 tournaments (6–0)	Finals by surface Hard (9–2) Clay (5−4)

Result	W–L	Date	Tournament	Tier	Surface	Opponent	Score
Win	1–0	Sep 2015	ITF Sharm El Sheikh, Egypt	10,000	Hard	(South Africa) Madrie Le Roux	6–4, 6–1
Win	2–0	Jun 2016	ITF Sharm El Sheikh, Egypt	10,000	Hard	(Switzerland) Chiara Grimm	6–4, 6–3
Win	3–0	Jun 2016	ITF Sharm El Sheikh, Egypt	10,000	Hard	(China) Zhao Qiangqian	6–1, 6–2
Win	4–0	Jun 2016	ITF Sharm El Sheikh, Egypt	10,000	Hard	(Croatia) Ana Savić	7–5, 6–4
Win	5–0	Jul 2016	ITF Târgu Jiu, Romania	10,000	Clay	(Romania) Gabriela Talabă	7–6^{(5)}, 6–3
Win	6–0	Aug 2016	ITF Târgu Jiu, Romania	10,000	Clay	(Moldova) Anastasia Vdovenco	7–5, 6–3
Win	7–0	Sep 2017	ITF Mamaia, Romania	25,000	Clay	(Romania) Cristina Dinu	6–2, 2–6, 6–3
Loss	7–1	Oct 2017	ITF Istanbul, Turkey	25,000	Hard (i)	(Russia) Vitalia Diatchenko	3–6, 1–6
Win	8–1	Nov 2017	Pune Championships, India	25,000	Hard	(India) Karman Thandi	6–3, 1–6, 6–0
Win	9–1	Apr 2019	Nana Trophy Tunis, Tunisia	25,000+H	Clay	(Chile) Daniela Seguel	6–4, 6–0
Loss	9–2	Apr 2019	Chiasso Open, Switzerland	25,000	Clay	(Russia) Varvara Gracheva	4–6, 2–6
Loss	9–3	Jun 2019	Grado Tennis Cup, Italy	25,000	Clay	(Slovakia) Rebecca Šramková	6–7^{(3)}, 1–3 ret.
Loss	9–4	Jun 2019	ITF Minsk, Belarus	25,000	Clay	(United Kingdom) Francesca Jones	6–7^{(6)}, 6–4, 1–6
Win	10–4	Feb 2020	Trnava Indoor, Slovakia	W25	Hard (i)	(Russia) Sofya Lansere	6–1, 4–2 ret.
Loss	10–5	Jan 2021	Open Andrézieux-Bouthéon, France	W60	Hard (i)	(France) Harmony Tan	6–3, 2–6, 1–6
Win	11–5	Sep 2022	ITF Le Neubourg, France	W80+H	Hard	(Belgium) Magali Kempen	6–4, 6-4
Win	12–5	Mar 2023	Trnava Indoor, Slovakia	W60	Hard (i)	(France) Océane Dodin	7–6^{(7)}, 7–6^{(4)}
Win	13–5	Mar 2023	ITF Palmanova, Spain	W25	Clay	(Belarus) Iryna Shymanovich	6–4, 6–0
Win	14–5	May 2023	Zagreb Ladies Open, Croatia	W60	Hard	(Germany) Ella Seidel	6–1, 3–6, 7–6^{(0)}
Loss	14–6	Nov 2023	Open de Valencia, Spain	W100	Clay	(Bulgaria) Viktoriya Tomova	5–7, 3–6

=== Doubles: 20 (10 titles, 10 runner-ups) ===
Legend $50/60,000 tournaments (1–1) $25,000 tournaments (3–4) $10,000 tournaments (6–5)	Finals by surface Hard (5–7) Clay (5–3)

Result	W–L	Date	Tournament	Tier	Surface	Partner	Opponents	Score
Win	1–0	Jun 2013	ITF Bals, Romania	10,000	Clay	(Romania) Raluca Elena Platon	(Romania) Oana Georgeta Simion (Romania) Gabriela Talabă	7–6^{(4)}, 6–4
Loss	1–1	Jul 2014	ITF Sharm El Sheikh, Egypt	10,000	Hard	(Lithuania) Akvilė Paražinskaitė	(Russia) Anastasia Shaulskaya (United States) Jan Abaza	4–6, 3–6
Win	2–1	Aug 2015	ITF Arad, Romania	10,000	Clay	(Romania) Elena-Gabriela Ruse	(Romania) Andreea Ghițescu (Slovakia) Katarína Strešnáková	6–3, 6–4
Loss	2–2	Sep 2015	ITF Sharm El Sheikh, Egypt	10,000	Hard	(United Kingdom) Freya Christie	(China) Lu Jiaxi (Sweden) Brenda Njuki	6–4, 6–7^{(4)}, [10–5]
Loss	2–3	Nov 2015	ITF Caracas, Venezuela	10,000	Hard	(Venezuela) Aymet Uzcategui	(Argentina) Catalina Pella (Brazil) Laura Pigossi	7–5, 1–6, [4–10]
Win	3–3	Nov 2015	ITF Pereira, Colombia	10,000	Clay	(Brazil) Laura Pigossi	(Colombia) María Herazo González (United States) Daniella Roldan	7–5, 6–3
Win	4–3	Jan 2016	ITF Fort de France, France	10,000	Hard	(Italy) Gaia Sanesi	(United States) Emina Bektas (United States) Zoë Gwen Scandalis	7–6^{(5)}, 7–6^{(5)}
Loss	4–4	Jan 2016	ITF Petit-Bourg, France	10,000	Hard	(Italy) Gaia Sanesi	(Netherlands) Rosalie van der Hoek (Netherlands) Kelly Versteeg	6–7^{(5)}, 1–6
Loss	4–5	Apr 2016	ITF Sharm El Sheikh, Egypt	10,000	Hard	(Egypt) Ola Abou Zekry	(United Kingdom) Samantha Murray (Greece) Despina Papamichail	3–6, 2–6
Win	5–5	Aug 2016	ITF Târgu Jiu, Romania	10,000	Clay	(Greece) Despina Papamichail	(Argentina) Julieta Lara Estable (Argentina) Daniela Farfan	6–7^{(5)}, 6–0, [10–5]
Loss	5–6	Sep 2016	Open de Saint-Malo, France	50,000	Hard (i)	(Romania) Alexandra Cadanțu	(North Macedonia) Lina Gjorcheska (Latvia) Diāna Marcinkēviča	6–3, 3–6, [8–10]
Win	6–6	Oct 2016	ITF Sharm El Sheikh, Egypt	10,000	Hard	(Sweden) Jacqueline Cabaj Awad	(Ukraine) Alona Fomina (Russia) Anna Morgina	6–3, 7–5
Loss	6–7	May 2017	Solgironès Open, Spain	25,000	Clay	(Mexico) Renata Zarazúa	(Russia) Olesya Pervushina (Ukraine) Valeriya Strakhova	5–7, 2–6
Win	7–7	Sep 2017	ITF Sofia, Bulgaria	25,000	Clay	(Russia) Anastasiya Komardina	(Greece) Valentini Grammatikopoulou (Romania) Elena-Gabriela Ruse	6–3, 6–0
Loss	7–8	Oct 2017	Open de Touraine, France	25,000	Hard (i)	(Romania) Elena-Gabriela Ruse	(United Kingdom) Sarah Beth Grey (United Kingdom) Samantha Murray	6–7^{(3)}, 3–6
Win	8–8	Nov 2017	Pune Championships, India	25,000	Hard	(Slovakia) Tereza Mihalíková	(Chinese Taipei) Lee Pei-chi (Russia) Yana Sizikova	4–6, 6–3, [10–7]
Loss	8–9	Sep 2018	ITF Dobrich, Bulgaria	25,000	Clay	(Romania) Elena-Gabriela Ruse	(Romania) Cristina Dinu (Venezuela) Aymet Uzcátegui	6–7^{(3)}, 2–6
Loss	8–10	Apr 2019	Nana Trophy, Tunisia	25,000	Clay	(Romania) Andreea Roșca	(Italy) Martina Colmegna (Italy) Anastasia Grymalska	4–6, 2–6
Win	9–10	Jan 2020	Open Andrézieux-Bouthéon, France	W60	Hard (i)	(Romania) Elena-Gabriela Ruse	(Cyprus) Raluca Șerban (Georgia (country)) Ekaterine Gorgodze	7–6^{(6)}, 6–7^{(4)}, [10–8]
Win	10–10	Oct 2020	ITF Istanbul, Turkey	W25	Hard (i)	(Romania) Elena-Gabriela Ruse	(United Kingdom) Maia Lumsden (Turkey) Melis Sezer	6–3, 6–4

== Wins against top 10 players ==
- Cristian has a 2–6 record against players who were, at the time the match was played, ranked in the top 10.

Season	2024	2026	Total
Wins	1	1	2

No.	Player	Rk	Event	Surface	Rd	Score	Rk	Years	Ref
1.	(Czech Republic) Barbora Krejčíková	10	China Open, China	Hard	2R	1–6, 6–4, 7–5	80	2024	
2.	Ekaterina Alexandrova	10	Adelaide International, Australia	Hard	2R	6–4, 6-4	37	2026	
