= Ana Bogdan =

Romanian tennis player (born 1992)

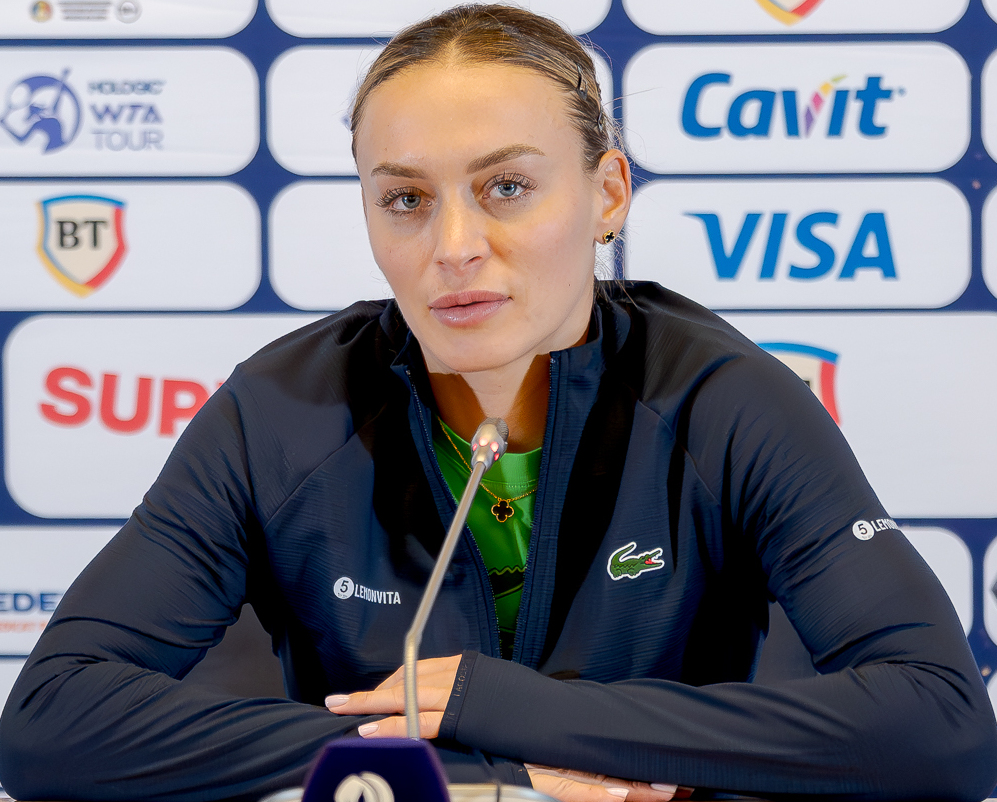
- Bogdan at the 2025 Transylvania Open
- Country (sports): Romania
- Born: 25 November 1992 (age 33) Sinaia, Romania
- Height: 1.71 m (5 ft 7 in)
- Turned pro: 2009
- Retired: 2026
- Plays: Right-handed (two-handed backhand)
- Coach: Bogdan Nitescu; Daniel Dobre
- Prize money: $3,588,306

Singles
- Career record: 441–294
- Career titles: 3 WTA 125, 14 ITF
- Highest ranking: No. 39 (24 July 2023)

Grand Slam singles results
- Australian Open: 3R (2018)
- French Open: 3R (2021, 2024)
- Wimbledon: 3R (2023)
- US Open: 2R (2016, 2017, 2018, 2019)

Other tournaments
- Olympic Games: 1R (2024)

Doubles
- Career record: 52–79
- Career titles: 1 ITF
- Highest ranking: No. 148 (1 July 2019)

Grand Slam doubles results
- Australian Open: 2R (2024)
- French Open: 1R (2018, 2020, 2023, 2024)
- Wimbledon: 2R (2018, 2023)
- US Open: 2R (2022)

Other doubles tournaments
- Olympic Games: 1R (2024)

Team competitions
- Fed Cup: 7–4

Ana Bogdan (born 25 November 1992) is a Romanian former professional tennis player. Having made her tour debut in 2009, she peaked at No. 39 in the WTA rankings in July 2023 in singles.

Bogdan had a successful junior career, reaching world No. 2 on 5 January 2008.

== Career ==
=== 2016: Major debut and WTA Tour semifinal ===
In May, Bogdan won her first ITF tournament of the year in Grado by defeating Susanne Celik in the final. (Note: To obtain data from this reference, select the corresponding year on the WTA or ITF website.) In July, she qualified for the WTA Tour event Stanford Classic. She won her first-round match against Asia Muhammad, before losing to Alison Riske in three sets in the second round.

At her next tournament, the Brasil Tennis Cup, Bogdan reached her first WTA Tour semifinal, defeating former world No. 1 and top seed, Jelena Janković, en route, but losing in the last four to sixth seed Timea Babos.

At the US Open, after qualifying, she defeated fellow Romanian Sorana Cîrstea in the first round for her first main-draw major match-win. In the second round, she lost to another countrywoman, Monica Niculescu.

=== 2017: Second career semifinal ===
At the Australian Open, Bogdan reached the main draw through qualifying, but was defeated in straight sets in the first round by 14th seed Elena Vesnina. She also entered the main draw at both the French Open for the first time, where she lost her opening match to lucky loser Ons Jabeur and Wimbledon, where she defeated Duan Yingying in straight sets, before losing to 21st seed Caroline Garcia in the second round.

At the US Open, Bogdan reached the second round of the main draw, matching her result from 2016, but was defeated in three sets by Monica Niculescu.

=== 2018: Australian Open third round, top 70 ===
The Australian Open saw Bogdan reach her best career result at a Grand Slam tournament, reaching the third round, upsetting 11th seed Kristina Mladenovic in straight sets in her first round match, and Yulia Putintseva in the second. As a result, she reached the top 100 for the first time in her career, at world No. 89 in the singles rankings. Bogdan then made the semifinals at both Monterrey and Bogotá. These results propelled her ranking into the top 70.

=== 2019–21: French Open third round, maiden WTA 125 final ===
Bogdan reached the quarterfinals at the 2020 Prague Open but was forced to retire due to a thigh injury while leading in the first set of her last eight match with Kristýna Plíšková.

Bogdan defeated fifth seed Barbora Krejčíková on her way to making the quarterfinals at the 2021 İstanbul Cup, at which point her run was ended by third seed Veronika Kudermetova.

The Romanian reached the third round of a major for the second time at the 2021 French Open, defeating lucky loser Elisabetta Cocciaretto and benefitting from second seed Naomi Osaka withdrawing, before losing to Paula Badosa in three sets.

Bogdan made it into her first WTA 125 final at the 2021 Open de Limoges, losing to second seed Alison Van Uytvanck.

=== 2022: First WTA Tour final and WTA 125 title ===
Bogdan reached her first WTA Tour final at the Poland Open but lost to fifth seed Caroline Garcia. She won her first WTA 125 title at the Iași Open, defeating Panna Udvardy in the final.

She overcame second seed Beatriz Haddad Maia in the quarterfinals at the Portorož Open, only to lose in the last four to Elena Rybakina.

Seeded sixth at the Emilia-Romagna Open in Parma, Bogdan reached the semifinals where she was defeated by eventual champion Mayar Sherif.

=== 2023: Wimbledon third round, two WTA 125 titles ===
Bogdan reached the third round at the Dubai Championships as a qualifier, before losing to the third seed, Jessica Pegula.

At Wimbledon, she reached the third round at the grass-court major for the first time with wins over 15th seed Liudmila Samsonova and Alycia Parks. In the third round she lost to Lesia Tsurenko in a match decided in a 38 point final set tiebreak, the longest in women's singles Grand Slam history.

Bogdan successfully defended the title at the WTA 125 event in Iași, defeating compatriot and top seed Irina-Camelia Begu in the final.

Seeded third at the Lausanne Ladies Open, she made it through to the quarterfinals where she retired injured, after losing the first set to Clara Burel.

In September, she won the WTA 125 tournament in Parma, defeating Anna Karolína Schmiedlová in the final.

The following month at the Transylvania Open, Bogdan reached the quarterfinals, but lost to fourth seed Rebeka Masarova in three sets.

=== 2024–26: Second WTA Tour final, injury and retirement ===
In February 2024, Bogdan defeated fellow Romanian Jaqueline Cristian in the semifinals at the Transylvania Open to set up a meeting with Karolína Plíšková in the championship match, which she lost in straight sets.

At the 2024 French Open, she defeated qualifier Elsa Jacquemot and 20th seed Anastasia Pavlyuchenkova to reach the third round, where she lost to 15th seed Elina Svitolina. As a result, Bogdan returned to the top 50 in the rankings, at No. 49 on 10 June 2024.

At the 2024 Paris Olympics, she lost in the first round to Italian player Jasmine Paolini, and partnering Jaqueline Cristian, lost in the first round of doubles to Japanese duo Shuko Aoyama and Ena Shibahara.

In Cleveland, Bogdan qualified for the main draw of the Tennis in Cleveland and defeated second-seeded Leylah Fernandez, and lucky loser Greet Minnen. She then lost to fifth seed Anastasia Potapova in the quarterfinals.

She qualified for the 2024 Japan Women's Open in October and reached the quarterfinals with wins over Veronika Kudermetova and fourth seed Marie Bouzková, before losing in the last eight to eventual champion Suzan Lamens.

In July 2025, a few days after losing in the first round at the Iași Open to Varvara Gracheva, Bogdan announced she was taking an indefinite break from the tour due to knee and ankle injuries suffered in practice for the tournament.

Bogdan made her comeback on the WTA Tour at the Transylvania Open in February 2026, receiving a wildcard entry into the main-draw but losing to qualifier Maja Chwalińska in the first round. She retired from professional tennis in October 2026.

== Personal life ==
Bogdan had previously been in a relationship with Romanian-Italian rally driver Simone Tempestini as of 2020, but the couple had broken up as of March of 2024.

== Performance timelines ==
Key
W	F	SF	QF	#R	RR	Q#	P#	DNQ	A	Z#	PO	G	S	B	NMS	NTI	P	NH

(W) winner; (F) finalist; (SF) semifinalist; (QF) quarterfinalist; (#R) rounds 4, 3, 2, 1; (RR) round-robin stage; (Q#) qualification round; (P#) preliminary round; (DNQ) did not qualify; (A) absent; (Z#) Davis/Fed Cup Zonal Group (with number indication) or (PO) play-off; (G) gold, (S) silver or (B) bronze Olympic/Paralympic medal; (NMS) not a Masters tournament; (NTI) not a Tier I tournament; (P) postponed; (NH) not held; (SR) strike rate (events won / competed); (W–L) win–loss record.
To avoid confusion and double counting, these charts are updated at the conclusion of a tournament or when the player's participation has ended.

Only main-draw results in WTA Tour, Grand Slam tournaments, Billie Jean King Cup, United Cup, Hopman Cup and Olympic Games are included in win–loss records.

=== Singles ===
Current through the 2025 WTA Tour.

Tournament	2009	...	2014	2015	2016	2017	2018	2019	2020	2021	2022	2023	2024	2025	SR	W–L	Win %
Grand Slam tournaments
Australian Open	A		A	Q1	A	1R	3R	1R	Q3	1R	A	1R	1R	Q1	0 / 6	2–6	25%
French Open	A		A	Q1	A	1R	2R	Q2	2R	3R	1R	1R	3R	Q1	0 / 7	5–7	42%
Wimbledon	A		A	Q1	Q1	2R	1R	1R	NH	1R	2R	3R	1R	Q2	0 / 7	4–7	36%
US Open	A		A	A	2R	2R	2R	2R	A	1R	Q2	1R	1R	A	0 / 7	4–7	36%
Win–Loss	0–0		0–0	0–0	1–1	2–4	4–4	1–3	1–1	1–4	1–2	2–4	2–4	0–0	0 / 27	15–27	36%
National representation
Billie Jean King Cup (Note: Formerly known as Fed Cup until 2020.)	A		A	A	A	A	PO	A	QR (Note: Edition is split into the two years due to COVID-19.)		QR	QR			0 / 0	4–2	67%
Olympic Games	NH		NH		A	NH				A	NH		1R	NH	0 / 1	0–1	0%
WTA 1000 tournaments
Qatar Open	NH		A	NTI	A	NTI	A	NTI	A	NTI	Q1	NTI	A	A	0 / 0	0–0	–
Dubai Championships	A		NTI	A	NTI	A	NTI	A	NTI	1R	NTI	3R	A	A	0 / 2	2–2	50%
Indian Wells Open	A		A	A	A	Q1	A	A	NH	A	A	A	1R	A	0 / 1	0–1	0%
Miami Open	A		A	A	A	Q2	A	Q1	NH	A	A	1R	1R	A	0 / 2	0–2	0%
Madrid Open	Q2		A	A	A	Q1	Q2	A	NH	1R	A	2R	1R	A	0 / 3	1–3	25%
Italian Open	A		A	A	A	A	A	A	A	A	A	2R	2R	A	0 / 2	2–2	50%
Canadian Open	A		A	A	A	Q1	1R	A	NH	A	A	A	A	A	0 / 1	0–1	0%
Cincinnati Open	A		A	A	A	Q1	1R	A	A	A	A	Q1	A	A	0 / 1	0–1	0%
China Open	A		A	A	A	A	Q1	A	Not Held			A	1R	A	0 / 1	0–1	0%
Wuhan Open	NH		A	A	A	A	Q1	A	Not Held				Q2	A	0 / 0	0–0	–
Win–Loss	0–0		0–0	0–0	0–0	0–0	0–2	0–0	0–0	0–2	0–0	4–4	1–5	0–0	0 / 13	5–13	28%
Career statistics
	2009	...	2014	2015	2016	2017	2018	2019	2020	2021	2022	2023	2024	2025	SR	W–L	Win %
Tournaments	0		2	6	6	8	16	13	3	15	10	14			Career total: 93		
Titles	0		0	0	0	0	0	0	0	0	0	0			Career total: 0		
Finals	0		0	0	0	0	0	0	0	0	1	0			Career total: 1		
Hard win–loss	0–0		0–1	0–2	5–4	2–4	10–11	2–7	1–2	4–8	5–3	4–7			0 / 48	33–49	40%
Clay win–loss	0–0		1–1	1–4	1–1	3–3	4–4	3–5	2–2	7–6	9–5	5–5			0 / 36	36–36	50%
Grass win–loss	0–0		0–0	0–0	0–1	1–1	0–1	0–1	0–0	0–1	1–1	3–3			0 / 9	5–9	36%
Overall win–loss	0–0		1–2	1–6	6–6	6–8	14–16	5–13	3–4	11–15	15–9	12–15			0 / 93	74–94	44%
Win %	–		33%	14%	50%	43%	47%	28%	43%	42%	63%	44%			Career total: 44%		
Year-end ranking (Note: 2007: WTA ranking–864, 2008: WTA ranking–794, ... 2010: WTA ranking–804, 2011: WTA ranking–616, 2012: WTA ranking–538, 2013: WTA ranking–314.)	503		241	161	118	115	71	129	92	112	48	67	116	442	$3,588,306		

=== Doubles ===
Current through the 2023 WTA Tour.

Tournament	2014	2015	2016	2017	2018	2019	2020	2021	2022	2023	SR	W–L	Win %
Grand Slam tournaments
Australian Open	A	A	A	A	A	1R	A	1R	A	1R	0 / 3	0–3	
French Open	A	A	A	A	1R	A	1R	A	A	1R	0 / 3	0–3	
Wimbledon	A	A	A	A	2R	A	NH	A	A	2R	0 / 2	2–2	
US Open	A	A	A	A	1R	A	A	A	2R	A	0 / 2	1–2	
Win–Loss	0–0	0–0	0–0	0–0	1–3	0–1	0–1	0–1	1–1	1–3	0 / 10	3–10	
National representation
Billie Jean King Cup	A	A	A	A	PO	A	QR		QR	QR	0 / 0	0–1	
WTA 1000 tournaments
Qatar Open	A	NTI	A	NTI	A	NTI	A	NTI	A	NTI	0 / 0	0–0	
Dubai Championships	NTI	A	NTI	A	NTI	A	NTI	A	NTI	1R	0 / 1	0–1	
Indian Wells Open	A	A	A	A	A	A	NH	A	A	A	0 / 0	0–0	
Miami Open	A	A	A	A	A	A	NH	A	A	A	0 / 0	0–0	
Madrid Open	A	A	A	A	A	A	NH	A	A	A	0 / 0	0–0	
Italian Open	A	A	A	A	A	A	A	A	A	A	0 / 0	0–0	
Canadian Open	A	A	A	A	A	A	NH	A	A	A	0 / 0	0–0	
Cincinnati Open	A	A	A	A	A	A	A	A	A	A	0 / 0	0–0	
China Open	A	A	A	A	A	A	Not Held			A	0 / 0	0–0	
Wuhan Open	A	A	A	A	A	A	Not Held				0 / 0	0–0	
Win–Loss	0–0	0–0	0–0	0–0	0–0	0–0	0–0	0–0	0–0	0–1	0 / 1	0–1	
Career statistics
	2014	2015	2016	2017	2018	2019	2020	2021	2022	2023	SR	W–L	Win %
Tournaments	1	1	1	2	3	6	1	2	2	6	Career total: 25		
Titles	0	0	0	0	0	0	0	0	0	0	Career total: 0		
Finals	0	0	0	0	0	0	0	0	0	0	Career total: 0		
Overall win–loss	0–1	0–1	0–1	1–2	1–4	4–6	0–1	1–2	2–2	2–6	0 / 25	11–26	
Year-end ranking (Note: 2008: WTA ranking–963, 2009–10: WTA ranking–n/a, 2011: WTA ranking–1165, 2012: WTA ranking–883, 2013: WTA ranking–746.)	829	711	1062	436	386	213	220	667	324	377			

== WTA Tour finals ==
=== Singles: 2 (2 runner-ups) ===
Legend WTA 250 (0–2)	Finals by surface Hard (0–1) Clay (0–1)	Finals by setting Outdoor (0–1) Indoor (0–1)

Result	W–L	Date	Tournament	Tier	Surface	Opponent	Score
Loss	0–1	Jul 2022	Poland Open, Poland	WTA 250	Clay	(France) Caroline Garcia	4–6, 1–6
Loss	0–2	Feb 2024	Transylvania Open, Romania	WTA 250	Hard (i)	(Czech Republic) Karolína Plíšková	4–6, 3–6

== WTA 125 finals ==
=== Singles: 4 (3 titles, 1 runner-up) ===
Result	W–L	Date	Tournament	Surface	Opponent	Score
Loss	0–1	Dec 2021	Open de Limoges, France	Hard (i)	(Belgium) Alison Van Uytvanck	2–6, 5–7
Win	1–1	Aug 2022	Iași Open, Romania	Clay	(Hungary) Panna Udvardy	6–2, 3–6, 6–1
Win	2–1	Jul 2023	Iași Open, Romania (2)	Clay	(Romania) Irina-Camelia Begu	6–2, 6–3
Win	3–1	Sep 2023	Parma Open, Italy	Clay	(Slovakia) Anna Karolína Schmiedlová	7–5, 6–1

== ITF Circuit finals ==
=== Singles: 21 (14 titles, 7 runner-ups) ===
Legend $100,000 tournaments (1–0) $60,000 tournaments (1–1) $25,000 tournaments (5–3) $10,000 tournaments (7–3)	Finals by surface Hard (8–4) Clay (6–3)

Result	W–L	Date	Tournament	Tier	Surface	Opponent	Score
Win	1–0	Jul 2011	ITF Izmir, Turkey	10,000	Clay	(Bulgaria) Aleksandrina Naydenova	6–1, 6–2
Loss	1–1	Oct 2011	ITF Antalya, Turkey	10,000	Clay	(Italy) Agnese Zucchini	0–6, ret.
Win	2–1	Sep 2012	ITF Antalya, Turkey	10,000	Hard	(Greece) Maria Sakkari	6–3, 6–2
Loss	2–2	Sep 2012	ITF Antalya, Turkey	10,000	Hard	(Ukraine) Ganna Poznikhirenko	6–2, 5–7, 4–6
Loss	2–3	Mar 2013	ITF Antalya, Turkey	10,000	Hard	(Spain) Eva Fernández Brugués	2–6, 0–6
Win	3–3	Apr 2013	ITF Antalya, Turkey	10,000	Hard	(Slovakia) Zuzana Luknarova	4–6, 7–6^{(3)}, 6–4
Win	4–3	May 2013	ITF Antalya, Turkey	10,000	Hard	(United States) Caitlin Whoriskey	7–6^{(4)}, 6–4
Win	5–3	Sep 2013	ITF Antalya, Turkey	10,000	Hard	(Sweden) Malin Ulvefeldt	6–0, 6–2
Win	6–3	Oct 2013	ITF Antalya, Turkey	10,000	Clay	(Czech Republic) Martina Kubicikova	6–4, 6–3
Win	7–3	Nov 2013	ITF Antalya, Turkey	10,000	Clay	(Georgia (country)) Ekaterine Gorgodze	7–6, 7–6
Loss	7–4	Aug 2014	GB Pro-Series Foxhills, UK	25,000	Hard	(Russia) Marta Sirotkina	5–7, 3–6
Loss	7–5	Feb 2015	GB Pro-Series Glasgow, UK	25,000	Hard (i)	(Czech Republic) Kristýna Plíšková	2–6, 2–6
Loss	7–6	Aug 2015	Ladies Open Hechingen, Germany	25,000	Clay	(Switzerland) Romina Oprandi	3–6, 6–1, 2–6
Win	8–6	Aug 2015	ITF Mamaia, Romania	25,000	Clay	(Romania) Cristina Dinu	6−7^{(5)}, 6−2, 6−3
Win	9–6	Sep 2015	ITF Sofia, Bulgaria	25,000	Clay	(Russia) Viktoria Kamenskaya	6–2, 3–6, 7–5
Win	10–6	Nov 2015	GB Pro-Series Bath, UK	25,000	Hard (i)	(Croatia) Ana Vrljić	6–3, 4–6, 6–1
Win	11–6	May 2016	Grado Tennis Cup, Italy	25,000	Clay	(Sweden) Susanne Celik	2–6, 6–2, 7−6^{(1)}
Loss	11–7	May 2019	Open Saint-Gaudens, France	W60	Clay	(Russia) Anna Kalinskaya	3–6, 4–6
Win	12–7	Nov 2019	ITF Saint-Étienne, France	W25	Hard (i)	(France) Océane Dodin	walkover
Win	13–7	Dec 2019	Dubai Tennis Challenge, UAE	W100+H	Hard	(Ukraine) Daria Snigur	6–1, 6–2
Win	14–7	Jan 2022	Open Andrézieux-Bouthéon, France	W60	Hard	(Russia) Anna Blinkova	7–5, 6–3

=== Doubles: 4 (1 title, 3 runner-ups) ===
Legend 60k tournaments (0–1) 10k tournaments (1–2)	Finals by surface Hard (1–2) Clay (0–1)

Result	W–L	Date	Tournament	Tier	Surface	Partner	Opponents	Score
Loss	0–1	Apr 2012	ITF Antalya, Turkey	10k	Hard	(Russia) Maria Mokh	(Georgia (country)) Oksana Kalashnikova (Georgia (country)) Sofia Kvatsabaia	4–6, 4–6
Win	1–1	Jun 2012	ITF Izmir, Turkey	10k	Hard	(Serbia) Teodora Mirčić	(Australia) Abbie Myers (Turkey) Melis Sezer	6–3, 3–0 ret.
Loss	1–2	Feb 2013	ITF Antalya, Turkey	10k	Clay	(Serbia) Teodora Mirčić	(Italy) Giulia Bruzzone (Italy) Martina Caregaro	3–6, 6–1, [6–10]
Loss	1–3	Jan 2017	Open Andrézieux-Bouthéon, France	60k	Hard (i)	(Romania) Ioana Loredana Roșca	(Germany) Nicola Geuer (Germany) Anna Zaja	3–6, 2–2 ret.
