= Briana Szabó =

Romanian born Hungarian tennis player (born 2005)

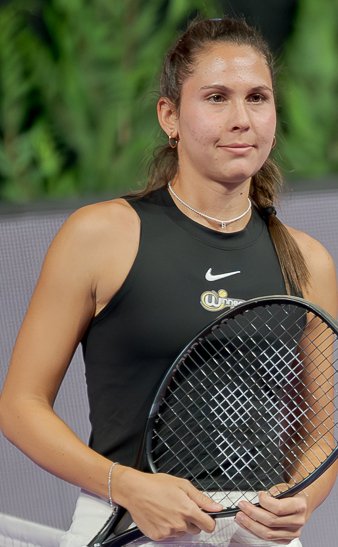
- Szabó at the 2025 Transylvania Open
- Country (sports): Romania
- Born: 26 November 2005 (age 20)
- Plays: Left (two-handed backhand)
- Prize money: $78,216

Singles
- Career record: 146–149
- Career titles: 1 ITF
- Highest ranking: No. 531 (10 August 2026)
- Current ranking: No. 573 (16 November 2026)

Doubles
- Career record: 111–91
- Career titles: 10 ITF
- Highest ranking: No. 248 (2 November 2026)
- Current ranking: No. 255 (16 November 2026)
- Last updated on: 20 November 2026.

Briana Szabó (born 26 November 2005) is a Romanian tennis player.

She has a career-high singles ranking of 531 by the WTA, reached on 10 August 2026, and a career-high doubles ranking of No. 248, achieved on 2 November 2026. She has won one singles and ten doubles titles on the ITF World Tour.

== Career ==
Szabó made her WTA Tour main-draw debut at the 2021 Winners Open, having received a wildcard into the singles draw, losing there to Katarzyna Kawa in the first round.

== ITF Circuit finals ==
=== Singles: 2 (1 title, 1 runner-up) ===
Legend W35 tournaments W15 tournaments (1–1)	Finals by surface Hard (1–0) Clay (0–1)

Result	W–L	Date	Tournament	Tier	Surface	Opponent	Score
Win	1–0	Nov 2023	ITF Sharm El Sheikh, Egypt	W15	Hard	(Ukraine) Kateryna Lazarenko	w/o
Loss	1–1	May 2026	ITF Belgrade, Serbia	W15	Clay	(Slovakia) Nina Vargová	2–6, 1–6

=== Doubles: 24 (10 titles, 14 runner-ups) ===
Legend W75 tournaments (0–1) W50 tournaments (2–0) W35 tournaments (5–7) W15 tournaments (3–6)	Finals by surface Hard (2–6) Clay (8–8)

Result	W–L	Date	Tournament	Tier	Surface	Partner	Opponents	Score
Loss	0–1	Mar 2022	ITF Palmanova, Spain	W15	Clay	(Romania) Bianca Bărbulescu	(Italy) Angelica Moratelli (Italy) Aurora Zantedeschi	5–7, 2–6
Loss	0–2	Jan 2024	ITF Fort-de-France, France (Martinique)	W15	Hard	(United States) Ashton Bowers	(Germany) Laura Böhner (Germany) Angelina Wirges	6–3, 0–6, [8–10]
Loss	0–3	Feb 2024	ITF Sharm El Sheikh, Egypt	W15	Hard	(Japan) Mana Ayukawa	(Romania) Karola Bejenaru (Lithuania) Andrė Lukošiūtė	4–6, 3–6
Win	1–3	Jun 2024	ITF Focșani, Romania	W15	Clay	(Czech Republic) Katerina Mandliková	(Argentina) Victoria Bosio (Romania) Patricia Maria Țig	7–6^{(3)}, 6–0
Loss	1–4	Jul 2024	ITF Buzău, Romania	W35	Clay	(Romania) Patricia Maria Țig	(Finland) Laura Hietaranta (Slovakia) Nina Vargová	3–6, 4–6
Win	2–4	Aug 2024	ITF Bistrița, Romania	W35	Clay	(Romania) Patricia Maria Țig	(Romania) Ilinca Amariei (Germany) Emily Welker	6–3, 6–4
Loss	2–5	Aug 2024	ITF Cluj-Napoca, Romania	W35	Clay	(Romania) Patricia Maria Țig	(Switzerland) Jenny Dürst (Romania) Oana Gavrilă	1–6, 0–6
Win	3–5	Sep 2024	ITF Slobozia, Romania	W50	Clay	(Romania) Patricia Maria Țig	(Romania) Irina Bara (Georgia (country)) Ekaterine Gorgodze	6–4, 7–5
Loss	3–6	Sep 2024	ITF Sharm El Sheikh, Egypt	W15	Hard	(Slovakia) Salma Drugdová	(Sweden) Jacqueline Cabaj Awad (Egypt) Sandra Samir	4–6, 0–6
Win	4–6	Oct 2024	ITF Kayseri, Turkiye	W50	Hard	(Romania) Patricia Maria Țig	(Turkey) Melis Sezer (Bulgaria) Isabella Shinikova	3–6, 6–4, [10–8]
Win	5–6	Oct 2024	ITF Kayseri, Turkiye	W15	Hard	(Romania) Ștefania Bojică	Varvara Panshina (Uzbekistan) Daria Shubina	6–4, 6–2
Loss	5–7	Nov 2024	ITF Antalya, Turkiye	W15	Clay	(Romania) Ștefania Bojică	(Chinese Taipei) Madeline Jessup (Indonesia) Janice Tjen	5–7, 6–4, [9–11]
Loss	5–8	Jan 2025	ITF Buenos Aires, Argentina	W35	Clay	(Czech Republic) Michaela Bayerlová	(Mexico) Victoria Rodríguez (Mexico) Ana Sofía Sánchez	7–5, 2–6, [8–10]
Loss	5–9	Jul 2025	ITF Buzău, Romania	W35	Clay	(Japan) Mana Ayukawa	(Romania) Elena Ruxandra Bertea; Daria Lodikova	6–7^{(7)}, 1–6
Win	6–9	Jul 2025	ITF Câmpina, Romania	W15	Clay	(Romania) Vanessa Teiuşanu	(Romania) Alexandra Anghel (Romania) Carmen Andreea Herea	6–3, 6–3
Win	7–9	Aug 2025	ITF Brașov, Romania	W35	Clay	(Romania) Ștefania Bojică	(Japan) Kanako Morisaki (Japan) Akiko Omae	5–7, 6–2, [10–7]
Loss	7–10	Aug 2025	ITF Loulé, Portugal	W35	Hard	(Ukraine) Daria Yesypchuk	(Netherlands) Britt du Pree (Netherlands) Sarah van Emst	3–6, 0–6
Win	8–10	Apr 2026	ITF Santa Margherita di Pula, Italy	W35	Clay	(Greece) Sapfo Sakellaridi	(Greece) Marianne Arygrokastriti (Romania) Arina Vasilescu	6–7^{(4)}, 7–6^{(6)}, [10–6]
Loss	8–11	May 2026	ITF Belgrade, Serbia	W15	Clay	(Slovenia) Alja Senica	(Serbia) Natalija Senić (Serbia) Anja Stanković	2–6, 5–7
Loss	8–12	May 2026	Zagreb Open, Croatia	W75	Clay	(Latvia) Beatrise Zeltiņa	(Switzerland) Naïma Karamoko (Croatia) Tara Würth	6–3, 6–7^{(4)}, [5–10]
Win	9–12	Jun 2026	ITF Bolszewo, Poland	W35	Clay	(Germany) Joëlle Steur	(Czech Republic) Amy Suchá (Poland) Inka Wawrzkiewicz	2–3 ret.
Win	10–12	Sep 2026	ITF Santa Margherita di Pula	W35	Clay	(Ukraine) Daria Yesypchuk	(Germany) Laura Boehner (Germany) Franziska Sziedat	6–1, 3–6, [10–6]
Loss	10–13	Oct 2026	ITF Bakersfield, United States	W35	Hard	(Bosnia and Herzegovina) Ema Burgić	(Australia) Lily Fairclough (United States) Anne Christine Lütkemeyer	2–6, 3–6
Loss	10–14	Nov 2026	ITF Orlando, United States	W35	Hard	(United States) Julia Adams	(United States) Annika Penickova (United States) Kristina Penickova	4–6, 1–6
