= 2023 Golden Gate Open =

- Date: August 13–19
- Edition: 1st
- Category: ATP Challenger 125; WTA 125
- Draw: 32S / 16D
- Prize money: $160,000 (ATP) $160,000 (WTA)
- Surface: Hard, outdoor
- Location: Stanford, United States
- Venue: Taube Tennis Center

Champions

Men's singles
- (France) Constant Lestienne

Women's singles
- (China) Wang Yafan

Men's doubles
- (Ecuador) Diego Hidalgo / (Colombia) Cristian Rodríguez

Women's doubles
- (United Kingdom) Jodie Burrage / (Australia) Olivia Gadecki
Golden Gate Open	· 2024 →

The 2023 Golden Gate Open was a professional tennis tournament played on outdoor hard courts. This tournament was part of the 2023 ATP Challenger Tour and the 2023 WTA 125 tournaments. The first edition took place at the Taube Tennis Center from August 13 to 19, 2023 in Stanford, United States.

== Men's singles main-draw entrants ==
=== Seeds ===
Country	Player	Rank^{1}	Seed
~~FRA~~	~~Arthur Rinderknech~~	~~61~~	~~1~~
JPN	Yosuke Watanuki	94	2
USA	Michael Mmoh	104	3
FRA	Constant Lestienne	114	4
CRO	Borna Gojo	117	5
AUS	James Duckworth	124	6
USA	Aleksandar Kovacevic	129	7
ARG	Thiago Agustín Tirante	134	8

- ^{1} Rankings are as of 7 August 2023.

=== Other entrants ===
The following players received wildcards into the singles main draw:

- (United States) Samir Banerjee
- (United States) Ethan Quinn
- (Spain) Fernando Verdasco

The following player received entry into the singles main draw as a special exempt:

- (Australia) Adam Walton

The following player received entry into the singles main draw using a protected ranking:

- (United States) Bradley Klahn

The following players received entry into the singles main draw as alternates:

- (Kazakhstan) Mikhail Kukushkin
- (United States) Zachary Svajda
- (Australia) Dane Sweeny

The following players received entry from the qualifying draw:

- (United States) Tristan Boyer
- (United States) Nick Chappell
- (Moldova) Alexander Cozbinov
- (Chinese Taipei) Jason Jung
- (United States) Mitchell Krueger
- (United States) Emilio Nava

The following player received entry as a lucky loser:

- (United States) Colin Markes

== Women's singles main-draw entrants ==
=== Seeds ===
Country	Player	Rank^{1}	Seed
GER	Tamara Korpatsch	80	1
	Kamilla Rakhimova	82	2
USA	Claire Liu	83	3
JPN	Nao Hibino	84	8
	Diana Shnaider	87	5
UKR	Kateryna Baindl	88	6
SWE	Rebecca Peterson	89	7
MNE	Danka Kovinić	97	8

- ^{1} Rankings are as of 7 August 2023.

=== Other entrants ===
The following players received wildcards into the singles main draw:

- (United Kingdom) Angelica Blake
- (United States) Claire Liu
- (United States) CoCo Vandeweghe
- (Canada) Carol Zhao

The following players received entry from the qualifying draw:

- (Japan) Mai Hontama
- Valeria Savinykh
- Iryna Shymanovich
- (China) Wang Yafan

The following player received entry as a lucky loser:

- (United States) Hailey Baptiste

=== Withdrawals ===
- (United States) Emina Bektas → replaced by (United States) Hailey Baptiste
- (United Kingdom) Harriet Dart → replaced by (China) Bai Zhuoxuan
- (Germany) Jule Niemeier → replaced by (United States) Robin Montgomery
- (Spain) Nuria Párrizas Díaz → replaced by (United Kingdom) Heather Watson

== Women's doubles main-draw entrants ==
=== Seeds ===
Country	Player	Country	Player	Rank^{1}	Seed
BRA	Ingrid Gamarra Martins		Lidziya Marozava	120	2
JPN	Makoto Ninomiya	USA	Sabrina Santamaria	141	2
	Kamilla Rakhimova		Iryna Shymanovich	193	3
USA	Sophie Chang	GBR	Heather Watson	197	4

- Rankings are as of 7 August 2023

=== Other entrants ===
The following pair received a wildcard into the doubles main draw:

- (United States) Alexis Blokhina / (United States) Connie Ma

== Champions ==
=== Men's singles ===
- (France) Constant Lestienne def. (United States) Emilio Nava 7–6^{(7–4)}, 6–2.

=== Women's singles ===
- (China) Wang Yafan def. Kamilla Rakhimova, 6–2, 6–0

=== Men's doubles ===
- (Ecuador) Diego Hidalgo / (Colombia) Cristian Rodríguez def. (United Kingdom) Julian Cash / (United Kingdom) Henry Patten 6–7^{(1–7)}, 6–4, [10–8].

=== Women's doubles ===
- (United Kingdom) Jodie Burrage / (Australia) Olivia Gadecki def. (United States) Hailey Baptiste / (United States) Claire Liu, 7–6^{(7–4)}, 6–7^{(6–8)}, [10–8]
