= 2023 Golden Gate Open – Women's singles =

Women's singles
- 2023 Golden Gate Open

Final
- Champion: (China) Wang Yafan
- Runner-up: Kamilla Rakhimova
- Score: 6–2, 6–0

Events
Singles	men	women
Doubles	men	women
Golden Gate Open	· 2024 →

This was the first edition of the tournament.

Qualifier Wang Yafan won the title, defeating Kamilla Rakhimova in the final, 6–2, 6–0.

== Seeds ==
1. (Germany) Tamara Korpatsch (second round)
2. Kamilla Rakhimova (final)
3. (United States) Claire Liu (first round)
4. (Japan) Nao Hibino (second round, retired)
5. Diana Shnaider (first round)
6. (Ukraine) Kateryna Baindl (second round)
7. (Sweden) Rebecca Peterson (second round)
8. (Montenegro) Danka Kovinić (second round)

== Draw ==
=== Key ===
- Q = Qualifier
- WC = Wild card
- LL = Lucky loser
- Alt = Alternate
- SE = Special exempt
- PR = Protected ranking
- ITF = ITF entry
- JE = Junior exempt
- w/o = Walkover
- r = Retired
- d = Defaulted
- SR = Special ranking

=== Finals ===
Semifinals
Q	(China) Wang Yafan	6	5	7
(Japan) Moyuka Uchijima	3	7	5
(China) Yuan Yue	3	7^{12}	3
2	Kamilla Rakhimova	6	6^{10}	6

Final
Q	(China) Wang Yafan	6	6
2	Kamilla Rakhimova	2	0

=== Top half ===
First round
1	(Germany) T Korpatsch	6	6
(Belgium) M Zanevska	3	2
(Ukraine) D Snigur	6	2	1
Q	(China) Y Wang	1	6	6
Q	(Japan) M Hontama	3	6	6
(Australia) K Birrell	6	2	2
(United States) A Krueger	6^{5}	5
7	(Sweden) R Peterson	7^{7}	7
4	(Japan) N Hibino	7	6
Q	V Savinykh	5	2
LL	(United States) H Baptiste	6^{3}	2
(Japan) M Uchijima	7^{7}	6
WC	(Canada) C Zhao	2	4
(United States) K Day	6	6
(United Kingdom) J Burrage	6	6
5	D Shnaider	4	2

Second round
1	(Germany) T Korpatsch	1	5
Q	(China) Y Wang	6	7
Q	(Japan) M Hontama	6	6
7	(Sweden) R Peterson	3	2
4	(Japan) N Hibino	5	0^{r}
(Japan) M Uchijima	7	2
(United States) K Day	6	6^{3}	3
(United Kingdom) J Burrage	2	7^{7}	6

Quarterfinals
Q	(China) Y Wang	6	6
Q	(Japan) M Hontama	3	3
(Japan) M Uchijima	6	4	6
(United Kingdom) J Burrage	4	6	4

Semifinals
Q	(China) Y Wang	6	5	7
(Japan) M Uchijima	3	7	5

=== Bottom half ===
First round
6	(Ukraine) K Baindl	6	6
(Australia) O Gadecki	2	2
(China) Y Yuan	4	7^{7}	6
(United States) K Volynets	6	6^{3}	0
(Spain) M Bassols Ribera	6^{5}	6	7^{7}
(United States) E Mandlik	7^{7}	4	6^{4}
(China) Z Bai	2	7^{7}	6
3/WC	(United States) C Liu	6	6^{3}	3
8	(Montenegro) D Kovinić	3	7	7
(Romania) E-G Ruse	6	5	5
Q	I Shymanovich	6	6
(United Kingdom) H Watson	2	4
WC	(United States) C Vandeweghe	3	6^{3}
(United States) R Montgomery	6	7^{7}
WC	(United Kingdom) A Blake	5	6	1
2	K Rakhimova	7	2	6

Second round
6	(Ukraine) K Baindl	6	6^{3}	2
(China) Y Yuan	4	7^{7}	6
(Spain) M Bassols Ribera	4	2
(China) Z Bai	6	6
8	(Montenegro) D Kovinić	4	4
Q	I Shymanovich	6	6
(United States) R Montgomery	5	3
2	K Rakhimova	7	6

Quarterfinals
(China) Y Yuan	w/o
(China) Z Bai
Q	I Shymanovich	3	6	4
2	K Rakhimova	6	2	6

Semifinals
(China) Y Yuan	3	7^{12}	3
2	K Rakhimova	6	6^{10}	6

== Qualifying ==
=== Seeds ===
1. (Slovenia) Kaja Juvan (withdrew)
2. (China) Wang Yafan (qualified)
3. (Georgia (country)) Iryna Shymanovich (qualified)
4. (United States) Hailey Baptiste (qualifying competition, lucky loser)
5. Valeria Savinykh (qualified)
6. (United States) Elvina Kalieva (qualifying competition)
7. (Japan) Mai Hontama (qualified)
8. (South Korea) Han Na-lae (first round)

=== Qualifiers ===
1. Valeria Savinykh
2. (China) Wang Yafan
3. Iryna Shymanovich
4. (Japan) Mai Hontama

=== Lucky loser ===
1. (United States) Hailey Baptiste

=== Qualifying draw ===
==== First qualifier ====
First round
Alt	(Japan) Makoto Ninomiya	2	0
WC	(United States) Alexandra Yepifanova	6	6
(United States) Madison Sieg	3	2
5	Valeria Savinykh	6	6

Qualifying competition
WC	(United States) Alexandra Yepifanova	4	6^{3}
5	Valeria Savinykh	6	7^{7}

==== Second qualifier ====
First round
2	(China) Wang Yafan	7	6
(United States) Louisa Chirico	5	1
(United States) Dalayna Hewitt	6	6
8	(South Korea) Han Na-lae	2	3

Qualifying competition
2	(China) Wang Yafan	3	7^{8}	6
(United States) Dalayna Hewitt	6	6^{6}	0

==== Third qualifier ====
First round
3	Iryna Shymanovich	4	6	4
(United States) Ashley Lahey	6	4	0^{r}
(India) Karman Thandi	6	5	0^{r}
6	(United States) Elvina Kalieva	3	7	1

Qualifying competition
3	Iryna Shymanovich	6	6
6	(United States) Elvina Kalieva	3	2

==== Fourth qualifier ====
First round
4	(United States) Hailey Baptiste	6^{5}	7^{7}	6
WC	(United States) Alexis Blokhina	7^{7}	6^{4}	1
(Canada) Stacey Fung	7	3	2
7	(Japan) Mai Hontama	5	6	6

Qualifying competition
4	(United States) Hailey Baptiste	6	2	2
7	(Japan) Mai Hontama	3	6	6
