= 2023 Golden Gate Open – Women's doubles =

Women's doubles
- 2023 Golden Gate Open

Final
- Champions: (United Kingdom) Jodie Burrage (Australia) Olivia Gadecki
- Runners-up: (United States) Hailey Baptiste (United States) Claire Liu
- Score: 7–6^{(7–4)}, 6–7^{(6–8)}, [10–8]

Events
Singles	men	women
Doubles	men	women
Golden Gate Open	· 2024 →

This was the first edition of the tournament.

Jodie Burrage and Olivia Gadecki won the title, defeating Hailey Baptiste and Claire Liu in the final, 7–6^{(7–4)}, 6–7^{(6–8)}, [10–8].

== Seeds ==
1. (Brazil) Ingrid Gamarra Martins / Lidziya Marozava (first round)
2. (Japan) Makoto Ninomiya / (United States) Sabrina Santamaria (first round)
3. Kamilla Rakhimova / Iryna Shymanovich (quarterfinals)
4. (United States) Sophie Chang / (United Kingdom) Heather Watson (first round)

== Draw ==
=== Key ===
- Q = Qualifier
- WC = Wild card
- LL = Lucky loser
- Alt = Alternate
- SE = Special exempt
- PR = Protected ranking
- ITF = ITF entry
- JE = Junior exempt
- w/o = Walkover
- r = Retired
- d = Defaulted
- SR = Special ranking

=== Draw ===
First round
1	(Brazil) I Gamarra Martins; L Marozava	1	6	[7]
(United States) Q Gleason (United States) D Hewitt	6	3	[10]
M Kozyreva (United States) A Lahey	4	6	[15]
(United States) C Corley (United States) I Corley	6	4	[17]
4	(United States) S Chang (United Kingdom) H Watson	3	4
(United Kingdom) J Burrage (Australia) O Gadecki	6	6
WC	(United States) A Blokhina (United States) C Ma	6	7^{7}
(Spain) M Bassols Ribera (Slovenia) K Juvan	2	6^{3}
(United States) A Zamarripa (United States) M Zamarripa	6	2	[3]
(United States) H Baptiste (United States) C Liu	2	6	[10]
(Japan) N Hibino; V Savinykh
3	K Rakhimova; I Shymanovich	w/o
(United States) A Krueger (United States) A Kulikov	6	2	[12]
(Australia) K Birrell; D Shnaider	3	6	[10]
(Japan) M Hontama (Japan) E Hozumi	7	4	[10]
2	(Japan) M Ninomiya (United States) S Santamaria	5	6	[5]

Quarterfinals
(United States) Q Gleason (United States) D Hewitt	6^{6}	1
(United States) C Corley (United States) I Corley	7^{8}	6
(United Kingdom) J Burrage (Australia) O Gadecki	6	6
WC	(United States) A Blokhina (United States) C Ma	4	3
(United States) H Baptiste (United States) C Liu	6	6
3	K Rakhimova; I Shymanovich	3	2
(United States) A Krueger (United States) A Kulikov	6	6
(Japan) M Hontama (Japan) E Hozumi	4	2

Semifinals
(United States) C Corley (United States) I Corley	2	1
(United Kingdom) J Burrage (Australia) O Gadecki	6	6
(United States) H Baptiste (United States) C Liu	6	6
(United States) A Krueger (United States) A Kulikov	4	2

Final
(United Kingdom) J Burrage (Australia) O Gadecki	7^{7}	6^{6}	[10]
(United States) H Baptiste (United States) C Liu	6^{4}	7^{8}	[8]
