= 2023 Golden Gate Open – Men's singles =

Men's singles
- 2023 Golden Gate Open

Final
- Champion: (France) Constant Lestienne
- Runner-up: (United States) Emilio Nava
- Score: 7–6^{(7–4)}, 6–2

Details
- Draw: 32
- Seeds: 8

Events
Singles	men	women
Doubles	men	women
Golden Gate Open	· 2024 →

This was the first edition of the tournament.

Constant Lestienne won the title after defeating Emilio Nava 7–6^{(7–4)}, 6–2 in the final.

== Seeds ==
1. (France) Arthur Rinderknech (withdrew)
2. (Japan) Yosuke Watanuki (semifinals, withdrew)
3. (United States) Michael Mmoh (quarterfinals)
4. (France) Constant Lestienne (champion)
5. (Croatia) Borna Gojo (quarterfinals)
6. (Australia) James Duckworth (quarterfinals)
7. (United States) Aleksandar Kovacevic (quarterfinals)
8. (Argentina) Thiago Agustín Tirante (first round)

== Draw ==
=== Key ===
- Q = Qualifier
- WC = Wild card
- LL = Lucky loser
- Alt = Alternate
- SE = Special exempt
- PR = Protected ranking
- ITF = ITF entry
- JE = Junior exempt
- w/o = Walkover
- r = Retired
- d = Defaulted
- SR = Special ranking

=== Finals ===
Semifinals
Q	(United States) Emilio Nava	2	7^{7}	6
Q	(United States) Tristan Boyer	6	6^{4}	1
4	(France) Constant Lestienne	w/o
2	(Japan) Yosuke Watanuki

Final
Q	(United States) Emilio Nava	6^{4}	2
4	(France) Constant Lestienne	7^{7}	6

=== Top half ===
First round
LL	(United States) Colin Markes	6	3	4
(Italy) F Gaio	3	6	6
WC	(United States) E Quinn	1	2
Q	(United States) Em Nava	6	6
(Bulgaria) A Andreev	5	6	6
WC	(United States) S Banerjee	7	2	4
(United States) D Kudla	3	2
7	(United States) A Kovacevic	6	6
3	(United States) M Mmoh	6	6
Q	(United States) M Krueger	2	3
(Czech Republic) D Svrčina	6	6
Q	(Chinese Taipei) J Jung	4	2
Q	(United States) T Boyer	6	7^{7}
PR	(United States) B Klahn	3	6^{2}
(Japan) S Shimabukuro	6	6
8	(Argentina) TA Tirante	1	3

Second round
(Italy) F Gaio	4	4
Q	(United States) Em Nava	6	6
(Bulgaria) A Andreev	5	3
7	(United States) A Kovacevic	7	6
3	(United States) M Mmoh	6	6
(Czech Republic) D Svrčina	4	3
Q	(United States) T Boyer	7	7^{10}
(Japan) S Shimabukuro	5	6^{8}

Quarterfinals
Q	(United States) Em Nava	7^{7}	7^{7}
7	(United States) A Kovacevic	6^{2}	6^{4}
3	(United States) M Mmoh	5	6^{5}
Q	(United States) T Boyer	7	7^{7}

Semifinals
Q	(United States) Em Nava	2	7^{7}	6
Q	(United States) T Boyer	6	6^{4}	1

=== Bottom half ===
First round
5	(Croatia) B Gojo	7	7^{7}
Alt	(Kazakhstan) M Kukushkin	5	6^{1}
(United States) A Michelsen	4	6	6
(South Korea) S-c Hong	6	2	0
WC	(Spain) F Verdasco	1	3
Q	(Moldova) A Cozbinov	6	6
Alt	(Australia) D Sweeny	6	6^{6}	6^{12}
4	(France) C Lestienne	2	7^{8}	7^{14}
6	(Australia) J Duckworth	6	6
(Argentina) GA Olivieri	2	3
Alt	(United States) Z Svajda	2	2
SE	(Australia) A Walton	6	6
Q	(United States) N Chappell	6	3	4
(United States) N Moreno de Alboran	3	6	6
(United States) S Johnson	5	7	4
2	(Japan) Y Watanuki	7	5	6

Second round
5	(Croatia) B Gojo	4	6	7^{7}
(United States) A Michelsen	6	4	6^{3}
Q	(Moldova) A Cozbinov	2	2
4	(France) C Lestienne	6	6
6	(Australia) J Duckworth	6	6
SE	(Australia) A Walton	3	4
(United States) N Moreno de Alboran	5	3
2	(Japan) Y Watanuki	7	6

Quarterfinals
5	(Croatia) B Gojo	2	2
4	(France) C Lestienne	6	6
6	(Australia) J Duckworth	1	3
2	(Japan) Y Watanuki	6	6

Semifinals
4	(France) C Lestienne	w/o
2	(Japan) Y Watanuki
