= 2023 Golden Gate Open – Men's doubles =

Men's doubles
- 2023 Golden Gate Open

Final
- Champions: (Ecuador) Diego Hidalgo (Colombia) Cristian Rodríguez
- Runners-up: (United Kingdom) Julian Cash (United Kingdom) Henry Patten
- Score: 6–7^{(1–7)}, 6–4, [10–8]

Events
Singles	men	women
Doubles	men	women
Golden Gate Open	· 2024 →

This was the first edition of the tournament.

Diego Hidalgo and Cristian Rodríguez won the title after defeating Julian Cash and Henry Patten 6–7^{(1–7)}, 6–4, [10–8] in the final.

== Seeds ==
1. (United Kingdom) Julian Cash / (United Kingdom) Henry Patten (final)
2. (Sweden) André Göransson / (Mexico) Miguel Ángel Reyes-Varela (first round)
3. (United States) Robert Galloway / (Australia) John-Patrick Smith (semifinals)
4. (United States) Evan King / (United States) Reese Stalder (first round)

== Draw ==
=== Key ===
- Q = Qualifier
- WC = Wild card
- LL = Lucky loser
- Alt = Alternate
- ITF = ITF entry
- PR = Protected ranking
- SR = Special ranking
- SE = Special exempt
- JE = Junior exempt
- JR = Junior Accelerator Programme entrant
- CO = College Accelerator Programme entrant
- NG = Next Gen Accelerator Program entrant
- w/o = Walkover
- r = Retired
- d = Defaulted

First round
1	(United Kingdom) J Cash (United Kingdom) H Patten	6^{1}	6	[10]
(United States) N Chappell (Moldova) A Cozbinov	7^{7}	4	[8]
(Philippines) R Gonzales (United States) A Lawson	6	6
(Finland) P Niklas-Salminen (Netherlands) B Stevens	3	4
3	(United States) R Galloway (Australia) J-P Smith	6	4	[11]
(United States) M Krueger (Venezuela) LD Martínez	3	6	[9]
(Australia) B Ellis (Australia) C Puttergill	7	6
WC	(United States) T Boyer (United States) Anders Matta	5	2
(Ecuador) D Hidalgo (Colombia) C Rodríguez	7^{7}	6
4	(United States) E King (United States) R Stalder	6^{5}	3
(Greece) M Pervolarakis (Australia) A Walton	7	4	[6]
(Mexico) H Hach Verdugo (New Zealand) A Sitak	5	6	[10]
(Latvia) M Lībietis (Japan) B McLachlan	6	6
2	(Sweden) A Göransson (Mexico) MÁ Reyes-Varela	3	4

Quarterfinals
1	(United Kingdom) J Cash (United Kingdom) H Patten	6	6
(Philippines) R Gonzales (United States) A Lawson	4	4
3	(United States) R Galloway (Australia) J-P Smith	6	6
(Australia) B Ellis (Australia) C Puttergill	2	4
(Bulgaria) A Andreev (Czech Republic) D Svrčina	6^{8}	2
(Ecuador) D Hidalgo (Colombia) C Rodríguez	7^{10}	6
(Mexico) H Hach Verdugo (New Zealand) A Sitak	6	6^{7}	[10]
(Latvia) M Lībietis (Japan) B McLachlan	4	7^{9}	[7]

Semifinals
1	(United Kingdom) J Cash (United Kingdom) H Patten	6	7^{7}
3	(United States) R Galloway (Australia) J-P Smith	4	6^{5}
(Ecuador) D Hidalgo (Colombia) C Rodríguez	6	6
(Mexico) H Hach Verdugo (New Zealand) A Sitak	3	3

Final
1	(United Kingdom) J Cash (United Kingdom) H Patten	7^{7}	4	[8]
(Ecuador) D Hidalgo (Colombia) C Rodríguez	6^{1}	6	[10]
