= 2023 US Open – Women's singles =

Tennis championship

Women's singles
- 2023 US Open

Final
- Champion: (United States) Coco Gauff
- Runner-up: Aryna Sabalenka
- Score: 2–6, 6–3, 6–2

Details
- Draw: 128 (16 Q / 8 WC )
- Seeds: 32

Events
Singles	men	women		boys	girls
Doubles	men	women	mixed	boys	girls
WC Singles	men	women	quad
WC Doubles	men	women	quad
← 2022 ·	US Open	· 2024 →

Coco Gauff defeated Aryna Sabalenka in the final, 2–6, 6–3, 6–2 to win the women's singles tennis title at the 2023 US Open. It was her first major singles title. Gauff was the first American teenager to win the title since Serena Williams in 1999, and one of three teenagers to win the title within five years (following Bianca Andreescu in 2019 and Emma Raducanu in 2021). Sabalenka was the first woman since Williams in 2016 to reach at least the semifinals of all four majors in a season.

Iga Świątek was the defending champion, but lost to Jeļena Ostapenko in the fourth round. Her defeat guaranteed a first-time US Open champion. As a result of Świątek's fourth-round defeat, Sabalenka claimed the world No. 1 singles ranking for the first time in her career.

The third-round match between Caroline Wozniacki, ranked No. 623, and Jennifer Brady, ranked No. 433 (both playing their first majors in over two years), was the first third-round match in any major between two players outside the top 300 in singles rankings, male or female. This was the first major since the 2019 US Open in which all eight quarterfinalists were seeded.

== Seeds ==
1. (Poland) Iga Świątek (fourth round)
2. Aryna Sabalenka (final)
3. (United States) Jessica Pegula (fourth round)
4. (Kazakhstan) Elena Rybakina (third round)
5. (Tunisia) Ons Jabeur (fourth round)
6. (United States) Coco Gauff (champion)
7. (France) Caroline Garcia (first round)
8. (Greece) Maria Sakkari (first round)
9. (Czech Republic) Markéta Vondroušová (quarterfinals)
10. (Czech Republic) Karolína Muchová (semifinals)
11. (Czech Republic) Petra Kvitová (second round)
12. (Czech Republic) Barbora Krejčíková (first round)
13. Daria Kasatkina (fourth round)
14. Liudmila Samsonova (third round)
15. (Switzerland) Belinda Bencic (fourth round)
16. Veronika Kudermetova (first round)
17. (United States) Madison Keys (semifinals)
18. Victoria Azarenka (second round)
19. (Brazil) Beatriz Haddad Maia (second round)
20. (Latvia) Jeļena Ostapenko (quarterfinals)
21. (Croatia) Donna Vekić (first round)
22. Ekaterina Alexandrova (third round)
23. (China) Zheng Qinwen (quarterfinals)
24. (Poland) Magda Linette (second round)
25. (Czech Republic) Karolína Plíšková (second round)
26. (Ukraine) Elina Svitolina (third round)
27. Anastasia Potapova (first round)
28. (Ukraine) Anhelina Kalinina (first round)
29. (Italy) Elisabetta Cocciaretto (first round)
30. (Romania) Sorana Cîrstea (quarterfinals)
31. (Czech Republic) Marie Bouzková (third round)
32. (Belgium) Elise Mertens (third round)

Click on the seed number of a player to go to their draw section.

== Draw ==
=== Key ===
- Q = Qualifier
- WC = Wild card
- LL = Lucky loser
- Alt = Alternate
- ITF = ITF entry
- PR = Protected ranking
- SR = Special ranking
- SE = Special exempt
- JE = Junior exempt
- JR = Junior Accelerator Programme entrant
- CO = College Accelerator Programme entrant
- NG = Next Gen Accelerator Program entrant
- w/o = Walkover
- r = Retired
- d = Defaulted

=== Finals ===
Quarterfinals
20	(Latvia) Jeļena Ostapenko	0	2
6	(United States) Coco Gauff	6	6
30	(Romania) Sorana Cîrstea	0	3
10	(Czech Republic) Karolína Muchová	6	6
9	(Czech Republic) Markéta Vondroušová	1	4
17	(United States) Madison Keys	6	6
23	(China) Zheng Qinwen	1	4
2	Aryna Sabalenka	6	6

Semifinals
6	(United States) Coco Gauff	6	7
10	(Czech Republic) Karolína Muchová	4	5
17	(United States) Madison Keys	6	6^{1}	6^{5}
2	Aryna Sabalenka	0	7^{7}	7^{10}

Final
6	(United States) Coco Gauff	2	6	6
2	Aryna Sabalenka	6	3	2

=== Top half ===
==== Section 1 ====
First round
1	(Poland) I Świątek	6	6
(Sweden) R Peterson	0	1
WC	(United States) C Ngounoue	0	2
PR	(Australia) D Saville	6	6
(United States) L Davis	6	6
(Montenegro) D Kovinić	2	2
Q	(Slovenia) K Juvan	6	7
29	(Italy) E Cocciaretto	2	5
20	(Latvia) J Ostapenko	6	4	6
(Italy) J Paolini	2	6	1
(France) A Cornet	2	6	4
E Avanesyan	6	1	6
LL	(Slovakia) V Hrunčáková	6	3	6^{6}
(China) Xiy Wang	4	6	7^{10}
(United States) B Pera	7	6
16	V Kudermetova	5	4

Second round
1	(Poland) I Świątek	6	6
PR	(Australia) D Saville	3	4
(United States) L Davis	7^{7}	4	3
Q	(Slovenia) K Juvan	6^{3}	6	6
20	(Latvia) J Ostapenko	6	5	7
E Avanesyan	3	7	5
(China) Xiy Wang	6	6^{5}	2
(United States) B Pera	3	7^{7}	6

Third round
1	(Poland) I Świątek	6	6
Q	(Slovenia) K Juvan	0	1
20	(Latvia) J Ostapenko	4	6	6
(United States) B Pera	6	3	3

Fourth round
1	(Poland) I Świątek	6	3	1
20	(Latvia) J Ostapenko	3	6	6

==== Section 2 ====
First round
11	(Czech Republic) P Kvitová	6	7^{7}
(Spain) C Bucșa	1	6^{5}
Q	T Prozorova	3	2
WC	(Denmark) C Wozniacki	6	6
LL	(Australia) K Birrell	3	6^{4}
PR	(United States) J Brady	6	7^{7}
A Sasnovich	3	1
24	(Poland) M Linette	6	6
32	(Belgium) E Mertens	3	6	7^{10}
Q	(Sweden) M Björklund	6	3	6^{3}
(United States) D Collins	6	6
(Czech Republic) L Fruhvirtová	2	0
Q	(Australia) O Gadecki	6	3	4
M Andreeva	1	6	6
Q	(Germany) L Siegemund	6	2	4
6	(United States) C Gauff	3	6	6

Second round
11	(Czech Republic) P Kvitová	5	6^{5}
WC	(Denmark) C Wozniacki	7	7^{7}
PR	(United States) J Brady	6	2	6
24	(Poland) M Linette	1	6	2
32	(Belgium) E Mertens	3	7^{9}	6
(United States) D Collins	6	6^{7}	1
M Andreeva	3	2
6	(United States) C Gauff	6	6

Third round
WC	(Denmark) C Wozniacki	4	6	6
PR	(United States) J Brady	6	3	1
32	(Belgium) E Mertens	6	3	0
6	(United States) C Gauff	3	6	6

Fourth round
WC	(Denmark) C Wozniacki	3	6	1
6	(United States) C Gauff	6	3	6

==== Section 3 ====
First round
4	(Kazakhstan) E Rybakina	6	6
(Ukraine) M Kostyuk	2	1
(Hungary) P Udvardy	6	2	4
(Australia) A Tomljanović	3	6	6
A Kalinskaya	6	6
(Czech Republic) K Siniaková	4	2
WC	(United States) K Day	2	3
30	(Romania) S Cîrstea	6	6
18	V Azarenka	6	6
WC	(France) F Ferro	1	2
(China) L Zhu	6	7
(Egypt) M Sherif	3	5
Q	(United Kingdom) Y Miyazaki	6	6
PR	M Betova	3	3
K Rakhimova	2	4
15	(Switzerland) B Bencic	6	6

Second round
4	(Kazakhstan) E Rybakina	w/o
(Australia) A Tomljanović
A Kalinskaya	3	4
30	(Romania) S Cîrstea	6	6
18	V Azarenka	3	3
(China) L Zhu	6	6
Q	(United Kingdom) Y Miyazaki	3	3
15	(Switzerland) B Bencic	6	6

Third round
4	(Kazakhstan) E Rybakina	3	7^{8}	4
30	(Romania) S Cîrstea	6	6^{6}	6
(China) L Zhu	6^{1}	6	3
15	(Switzerland) B Bencic	7^{7}	2	6

Fourth round
30	(Romania) S Cîrstea	6	6
15	(Switzerland) B Bencic	3	3

==== Section 4 ====
First round
10	(Czech Republic) K Muchová	6	6
WC	(Australia) S Hunter	4	0
(Poland) M Fręch	7^{12}	1	6
(United States) E Navarro	6^{10}	6	2
(France) V Gracheva	4	2
(United States) T Townsend	6	6
(United States) S Stephens	2	7	4
19	(Brazil) B Haddad Maia	6	5	6
28	(Ukraine) A Kalinina	4	5
(Spain) S Sorribes Tormo	6	7
Q	(United States) K Volynets	3	4
(China) Xin Wang	6	6
(Slovakia) AK Schmiedlová	6	3	6
(Ukraine) K Baindl	4	6	3
(Spain) R Masarova	6	6
8	(Greece) M Sakkari	4	4

Second round
10	(Czech Republic) K Muchová	6	6
(Poland) M Fręch	3	3
(United States) T Townsend	7^{7}	7
19	(Brazil) B Haddad Maia	6^{1}	5
(Spain) S Sorribes Tormo	7	3	4
(China) Xin Wang	5	6	6
(Slovakia) AK Schmiedlová	7^{7}	6
(Spain) R Masarova	6^{0}	2

Third round
10	(Czech Republic) K Muchová	7^{7}	6
(United States) T Townsend	6^{0}	3
(China) Xin Wang	4	6	6
(Slovakia) AK Schmiedlová	6	3	2

Fourth round
10	(Czech Republic) K Muchová	6	5	6
(China) Xin Wang	3	7	1

=== Bottom half ===
==== Section 5 ====
First round
7	(France) C Garcia	4	1
Q	(China) Y Wang	6	6
(United Kingdom) K Boulter	6	6
(France) D Parry	4	0
(United States) P Stearns	6	6
(Bulgaria) V Tomova	3	4
(Denmark) C Tauson	7^{7}	3	6
27	A Potapova	6^{4}	6	3
22	E Alexandrova	7^{7}	5	6
(Canada) L Fernandez	6^{4}	7	4
Q	(France) E Jacquemot	5	6	1
(Ukraine) L Tsurenko	7	3	6
(Italy) M Trevisan	0	7^{7}	7^{10}
(Kazakhstan) Y Putintseva	6	6^{0}	6^{8}
Q	(South Korea) N-l Han	3	0
9	(Czech Republic) M Vondroušová	6	6

Second round
Q	(China) Y Wang	7	1	4
(United Kingdom) K Boulter	5	6	6
(United States) P Stearns	6	6
(Denmark) C Tauson	3	0
22	E Alexandrova	6	6
(Ukraine) L Tsurenko	1	3
(Italy) M Trevisan	2	2
9	(Czech Republic) M Vondroušová	6	6

Third round
(United Kingdom) K Boulter	4	3
(United States) P Stearns	6	6
22	E Alexandrova	2	1
9	(Czech Republic) M Vondroušová	6	6

Fourth round
(United States) P Stearns	7^{7}	3	2
9	(Czech Republic) M Vondroušová	6^{3}	6	6

==== Section 6 ====
First round
14	L Samsonova	7^{7}	6
(United States) C Liu	6^{3}	3
(Romania) I-C Begu	3	2
(Germany) T Korpatsch	6	6
LL	(Belgium) Y Wickmayer	6	6
Q	V Zvonareva	4	4
(Netherlands) A Rus	2	4
17	(United States) M Keys	6	6
26	(Ukraine) E Svitolina	6	6
(Germany) A-L Friedsam	3	1
A Pavlyuchenkova	6	6
Q	(United States) F Crawley	2	4
PR	(Romania) PM Țig	7^{8}	7^{7}
(Canada) R Marino	6^{6}	6^{1}
(Italy) C Giorgi	2	2
3	(United States) J Pegula	6	6

Second round
14	L Samsonova	6	6
(Germany) T Korpatsch	3	3
LL	(Belgium) Y Wickmayer	1	2
17	(United States) M Keys	6	6
26	(Ukraine) E Svitolina	5	6	6
A Pavlyuchenkova	7	4	4
PR	(Romania) PM Țig	3	1
3	(United States) J Pegula	6	6

Third round
14	L Samsonova	7	2	2
17	(United States) M Keys	5	6	6
26	(Ukraine) E Svitolina	4	6	2
3	(United States) J Pegula	6	4	6

Fourth round
17	(United States) M Keys	6	6
3	(United States) J Pegula	1	3

==== Section 7 ====
First round
5	(Tunisia) O Jabeur	7	7^{7}
(Colombia) C Osorio	5	6^{4}
(Czech Republic) L Nosková	6	6
(United States) M Brengle	2	1
(Germany) T Maria	2	1
(Croatia) P Martić	6	6
WC	(United States) A Krueger	5	4
31	(Czech Republic) M Bouzková	7	6
23	(China) Q Zheng	6	6
(Argentina) N Podoroska	1	0
PR	(Czech Republic) B Strýcová	4	4
(Estonia) K Kanepi	6	6
WC	(United States) R Montgomery	2	1
Q	(Germany) E Lys	6	6
(Italy) L Bronzetti	6	7^{7}
12	(Czech Republic) B Krejčíková	4	6^{3}

Second round
5	(Tunisia) O Jabeur	7^{9}	4	6
(Czech Republic) L Nosková	6^{7}	6	3
(Croatia) P Martić	1	2
31	(Czech Republic) M Bouzková	6	6
23	(China) Q Zheng	6	3	6
(Estonia) K Kanepi	2	6	2
Q	(Germany) E Lys	3	2
(Italy) L Bronzetti	6	6

Third round
5	(Tunisia) O Jabeur	5	7^{7}	6
31	(Czech Republic) M Bouzková	7	6^{5}	3
23	(China) Q Zheng	6	4	6
(Italy) L Bronzetti	3	6	4

Fourth round
5	(Tunisia) O Jabeur	2	4
23	(China) Q Zheng	6	6

==== Section 8 ====
First round
13	D Kasatkina	2	6	6
(United States) A Parks	6	4	2
(Romania) A Bogdan	6^{2}	4
(United States) S Kenin	7^{7}	6
Q	(Belgium) G Minnen	6	6
WC	(United States) V Williams	1	1
Q	(United States) S Vickery	2	7	6
21	(Croatia) D Vekić	6	5	2
25	(Czech Republic) Ka Plíšková	6	6
Q	(Romania) E-G Ruse	1	4
(United States) C Dolehide	4	3
(France) C Burel	6	6
A Blinkova	3	4
(United Kingdom) J Burrage	6	6
(Belgium) M Zanevska	3	2
2	A Sabalenka	6	6

Second round
13	D Kasatkina	2	6	6
(United States) S Kenin	6	4	4
Q	(Belgium) G Minnen	6	4	6
Q	(United States) S Vickery	3	6	4
25	(Czech Republic) Ka Plíšková	4	2
(France) C Burel	6	6
(United Kingdom) J Burrage	3	2
2	A Sabalenka	6	6

Third round
13	D Kasatkina	6	6
Q	(Belgium) G Minnen	3	4
(France) C Burel	1	1
2	A Sabalenka	6	6

Fourth round
13	D Kasatkina	1	3
2	A Sabalenka	6	6

== Championship match statistics ==
Category	(United States) Gauff	Sabalenka
1st serve %	53/79 (66%)	40/77 (52%)
1st serve points won	33 of 53 = 62%	26 of 40 = 65%
2nd serve points won	14 of 27 = 52%	15 of 37 = 41%
Total service points won	47 of 80 = 58.75%	41 of 77 = 53.25%
Aces	2	4
Double faults	5	6
Winners	13	25
Unforced errors	19	46
Net points won	7 of 10 = 70%	13 of 20 = 65%
Break points converted	5 of 9 = 56%	4 of 10 = 40%
Return points won	36 of 77 = 47%	33 of 79 = 42%
Total points won	83	74

== Seeded players ==
The following are the seeded players. Seedings are based on WTA rankings as of August 21, 2023. Rankings and points before are as of August 28, 2023.

Seed	Rank	Player	Points before	Points defending	Points won	Points after	Status
1	1	(Poland) Iga Świątek	9,955	2,000	240	8,195	Fourth round lost to (Latvia) Jeļena Ostapenko [20]
2	2	Aryna Sabalenka	8,746	780	1,300	9,266	Runner-up, lost to (United States) Coco Gauff [6]
3	3	(United States) Jessica Pegula	5,945	430	240	5,755	Fourth round lost to (United States) Madison Keys [17]
4	4	(Kazakhstan) Elena Rybakina	5,670	10	130	5,790	Third round lost to (Romania) Sorana Cîrstea [30]
5	5	(Tunisia) Ons Jabeur	4,831	1,300	240	3,771	Fourth round lost to (China) Zheng Qinwen [23]
6	6	(United States) Coco Gauff	4,595	430	2,000	6,165	Champion, defeated Aryna Sabalenka [2]
7	7	(France) Caroline Garcia	3,820	780	10	3,050	First round lost to (China) Wang Yafan [Q]
8	8	(Greece) Maria Sakkari	3,585	70	10	3,525	First round lost to (Spain) Rebeka Masarova
9	9	(Czech Republic) Markéta Vondroušová	3,400	0	430	3,830	Quarterfinals lost to (United States) Madison Keys [17]
10	10	(Czech Republic) Karolína Muchová	2,995	10	780	3,765	Semifinals lost to (United States) Coco Gauff [6]
11	11	(Czech Republic) Petra Kvitová	2,920	240	70	2,750	Second round lost to (Denmark) Caroline Wozniacki [WC]
12	12	(Czech Republic) Barbora Krejčíková	2,811	70	10	2,751	First round lost to (Italy) Lucia Bronzetti
13	14	Daria Kasatkina	2,560	10	240	2,790	Fourth round lost to Aryna Sabalenka [2]
14	15	Liudmila Samsonova	2,525	240	130	2,415	Third round lost to (United States) Madison Keys [17]
15	13	(Switzerland) Belinda Bencic	2,605	130	240	2,715	Fourth round lost to (Romania) Sorana Cîrstea [30]
16	16	Veronika Kudermetova	2,480	240	10	2,250	First round lost to (United States) Bernarda Pera
17	17	(United States) Madison Keys	2,290	130	780	2,940	Semifinals lost to Aryna Sabalenka [2]
18	18	Victoria Azarenka	2,235	240	70	2,065	Second round lost to (China) Zhu Lin
19	19	(Brazil) Beatriz Haddad Maia	2,220	70	70	2,220	Second round lost to (United States) Taylor Townsend
20	21	(Latvia) Jeļena Ostapenko	2,160	10	430	2,580	Quarterfinals lost to (United States) Coco Gauff [6]
21	22	(Croatia) Donna Vekić	2,125	10	10	2,125	First round lost to (United States) Sachia Vickery [Q]
22	20	Ekaterina Alexandrova	2,190	70	130	2,250	Third round lost to (Czech Republic) Markéta Vondroušová [9]
23	23	(China) Zheng Qinwen	1,823	130	430	2,123	Quarterfinals lost to Aryna Sabalenka [2]
24	24	(Poland) Magda Linette	1,756	10	70	1,816	Second round lost to (United States) Jennifer Brady [PR]
25	25	(Czech Republic) Karolína Plíšková	1,685	430	70	1,325	Second round lost to (France) Clara Burel
26	26	(Ukraine) Elina Svitolina	1,679	0	130	1,809	Third round lost to (United States) Jessica Pegula [3]
27	27	Anastasia Potapova	1,675	70	10	1,615	First round lost to (Denmark) Clara Tauson
28	28	(Ukraine) Anhelina Kalinina	1,597	70	10	1,537	First round lost to (Spain) Sara Sorribes Tormo
29	29	(Italy) Elisabetta Cocciaretto	1,420	40	10	1,390	First round lost to (Slovenia) Kaja Juvan [Q]
30	30	(Romania) Sorana Cîrstea	1,400	70	430	1,760	Quarterfinals lost to (Czech Republic) Karolína Muchová [10]
31	31	(Czech Republic) Marie Bouzková	1,393	70	130	1,453	Third round lost to (Tunisia) Ons Jabeur [5]
32	32	(Belgium) Elise Mertens	1,389	10	130	1,509	Third round lost to (United States) Coco Gauff [6]

== Other entry information ==
=== Wild cards ===
- (United States) Kayla Day
- (France) Fiona Ferro
- (Australia) Storm Hunter
- (United States) Ashlyn Krueger
- (United States) Robin Montgomery
- (United States) Clervie Ngounoue
- (United States) Venus Williams
- (Denmark) Caroline Wozniacki

=== Protected ranking ===
- (United States) Jennifer Brady (14)
- (Czech Republic) Barbora Strýcová (39)
- (Australia) Daria Saville (54)
- (Romania) Patricia Maria Țig (65)
- Margarita Betova (100)

=== Qualifiers ===
- (Sweden) Mirjam Björklund
- (United States) Fiona Crawley
- (Australia) Olivia Gadecki
- (South Korea) Han Na-lae
- (France) Elsa Jacquemot
- (Slovenia) Kaja Juvan
- (Germany) Eva Lys
- (Belgium) Greet Minnen
- (United Kingdom) Yuriko Miyazaki
- Tatiana Prozorova
- (Romania) Elena-Gabriela Ruse
- (Germany) Laura Siegemund
- (United States) Sachia Vickery
- (United States) Katie Volynets
- (China) Wang Yafan
- Vera Zvonareva

=== Lucky losers ===
- (Australia) Kimberly Birrell
- (Slovakia) Viktória Hrunčáková
- (Belgium) Yanina Wickmayer

=== Withdrawals ===
- † (United States) Shelby Rogers (51) → replaced by (Ukraine) Kateryna Baindl (100)
- ‡ (Serbia) Aleksandra Krunić (99 PR) → replaced by Margarita Betova (100 PR)
- ‡ (China) Zhang Shuai (45) → replaced by (United States) Caroline Dolehide (101)
- ‡ (United States) Caty McNally (71) → replaced by (United States) Madison Brengle (102)
- ‡ (Romania) Simona Halep (55) → replaced by (United States) Taylor Townsend (103)
- § (Canada) Bianca Andreescu (44) → replaced by (Belgium) Yanina Wickmayer (LL)
- § (Austria) Julia Grabher (54) → replaced by (Slovakia) Viktória Hrunčáková (LL)
- § (Spain) Paula Badosa (34) → replaced by (Australia) Kimberly Birrell (LL)

† – not included on entry list
‡ – withdrew from entry list
§ – withdrew from main draw

Preceded by 2023 Wimbledon Championships – Women's singles	Grand Slam women's singles	Succeeded by 2024 Australian Open – Women's singles
