= 2025 Australian Open – Women's doubles =

Women's doubles
- 2025 Australian Open

Final
- Champions: (Czech Republic) Kateřina Siniaková (United States) Taylor Townsend
- Runners-up: (Chinese Taipei) Hsieh Su-wei (Latvia) Jeļena Ostapenko
- Score: 6–2, 6–7^{(4–7)}, 6–3

Details
- Draw: 64
- Seeds: 16

Events
Singles	men	women		boys	girls
Doubles	men	women	mixed	boys	girls
WC Singles	men	women	quad	boys	girls
WC Doubles	men	women	quad	boys	girls
- Australian Open

Kateřina Siniaková and Taylor Townsend defeated defending champion Hsieh Su-wei and her partner Jeļena Ostapenko in the final, 6–2, 6–7^{(4–7)}, 6–3 to win the women's doubles tennis title at the 2025 Australian Open. It was their second major title as a team, and the second major title overall for Townsend and tenth for Siniaková. Siniaková became the first woman to win a tenth major doubles title since Martina Hingis at the 2015 Wimbledon Championships.

Hsieh and Elise Mertens were the defending champions, but chose not to participate together. Mertens partnered Ellen Perez, but lost to Marta Kostyuk and Elena-Gabriela Ruse in the second round.

Siniaková retained the world No. 1 doubles ranking by reaching the semifinals. Erin Routliffe was also in contention for the top ranking at the beginning of the tournament.

== Seeds ==
1. (Czech Republic) Kateřina Siniaková / (United States) Taylor Townsend (champions)
2. (Canada) Gabriela Dabrowski / (New Zealand) Erin Routliffe (semifinals)
3. (Chinese Taipei) Hsieh Su-wei / (Latvia) Jeļena Ostapenko (final)
4. (Italy) Sara Errani / (Italy) Jasmine Paolini (second round)
5. (Chinese Taipei) Chan Hao-ching / (Ukraine) Lyudmyla Kichenok (third round)
6. (Belgium) Elise Mertens / (Australia) Ellen Perez (second round)
7. (United States) Asia Muhammad / (Netherlands) Demi Schuurs (third round)
8. (Kazakhstan) Anna Danilina / Irina Khromacheva (first round)
9. (France) Kristina Mladenovic / (China) Zhang Shuai (quarterfinals)
10. (United States) Sofia Kenin / (Romania) Monica Niculescu (first round)
11. Veronika Kudermetova / (Japan) Ena Shibahara (second round)
12. (China) Guo Hanyu / Alexandra Panova (third round)
13. (Hungary) Tímea Babos / (United States) Nicole Melichar-Martinez (third round)
14. (Czech Republic) Marie Bouzková / (United States) Bethanie Mattek-Sands (first round)
15. (Brazil) Beatriz Haddad Maia / (Germany) Laura Siegemund (third round)
16. (Canada) Leylah Fernandez / (Ukraine) Nadiia Kichenok (third round)

Click on the seed number of a player to go to their draw section.

== Draw ==
Key

- Q = Qualifier
- WC = Wild card
- LL = Lucky loser
- Alt = Alternate
- ITF = ITF entry
- PR = Protected ranking
- SR = Special ranking
- SE = Special exempt
- JE = Junior exempt
- JR = Junior Accelerator Programme entrant
- CO = College Accelerator Programme entrant
- NG = Next Gen Accelerator Program entrant
- w/o = Walkover
- r = Retired
- d = Defaulted

=== Finals ===
Quarterfinals
1	(Czech Republic) Kateřina Siniaková (United States) Taylor Townsend	6	7
9	(France) Kristina Mladenovic (China) Zhang Shuai	1	5
Mirra Andreeva; Diana Shnaider	6	6
Kamilla Rakhimova (Spain) Sara Sorribes Tormo	3	0
(Ukraine) Marta Kostyuk (Romania) Elena-Gabriela Ruse	2	7	5
3	(Chinese Taipei) Hsieh Su-wei (Latvia) Jeļena Ostapenko	6	5	7
(Japan) Miyu Kato (Mexico) Renata Zarazúa	3	2
2	(Canada) Gabriela Dabrowski (New Zealand) Erin Routliffe	6	6

Semifinals
1	(Czech Republic) Kateřina Siniaková (United States) Taylor Townsend	6^{4}	6	6
Mirra Andreeva; Diana Shnaider	7^{7}	4	3
3	(Chinese Taipei) Hsieh Su-wei (Latvia) Jeļena Ostapenko	7^{7}	3	6
2	(Canada) Gabriela Dabrowski (New Zealand) Erin Routliffe	6^{3}	6	3

Final
1	(Czech Republic) Kateřina Siniaková (United States) Taylor Townsend	6	6^{4}	6
3	(Chinese Taipei) Hsieh Su-wei (Latvia) Jeļena Ostapenko	2	7^{7}	3

=== Top half ===
==== Section 1 ====
First round
1	(Czech Republic) K Siniaková (United States) T Townsend	6	6
(Hungary) F Stollár (New Zealand) L Sun	2	4
(United States) C Dolehide (United States) A Krueger	4	2
(Japan) S Aoyama (Japan) E Hozumi	6	6
(Romania) J Cristian (Italy) C Rosatello	6	6^{2}	6
(Spain) C Bucșa; Y Sizikova	2	7^{7}	4
WC	(Australia) T Gibson (Australia) M Joint	3	3
16	(Canada) L Fernandez (Ukraine) N Kichenok	6	6
9	(France) K Mladenovic (China) S Zhang	5	6	7
(United States) M Kessler (Netherlands) A Rus	7	3	5
(Romania) I-C Begu (Brazil) I Martins	2	6^{3}
(United States) P Stearns (Brazil) L Stefani	6	7^{7}
(Czech Republic) L Nosková (United Kingdom) H Watson	3	5
(United Kingdom) H Dart (France) D Parry	6	7
(Serbia) O Danilović; A Potapova	7	4	4
5	(Chinese Taipei) H-c Chan (Ukraine) L Kichenok	5	6	6

Second round
1	(Czech Republic) K Siniaková (United States) T Townsend	7^{7}	6
(Japan) S Aoyama (Japan) E Hozumi	6^{4}	2
(Romania) J Cristian (Italy) C Rosatello	6	2	3
16	(Canada) L Fernandez (Ukraine) N Kichenok	4	6	6
9	(France) K Mladenovic (China) S Zhang	6	6
(United States) P Stearns (Brazil) L Stefani	2	2
(United Kingdom) H Dart (France) D Parry	0	3
5	(Chinese Taipei) H-c Chan (Ukraine) L Kichenok	6	6

Third round
1	(Czech Republic) K Siniaková (United States) T Townsend	6	6
16	(Canada) L Fernandez (Ukraine) N Kichenok	3	0
9	(France) K Mladenovic (China) S Zhang	7^{7}	6
5	(Chinese Taipei) H-c Chan (Ukraine) L Kichenok	6^{3}	2

Quarterfinals
1	(Czech Republic) K Siniaková (United States) T Townsend	6	7
9	(France) K Mladenovic (China) S Zhang	1	5

==== Section 2 ====
First round
4	(Italy) S Errani (Italy) J Paolini	6	7
WC	(Australia) P Hon (Australia) D Saville	1	5
(Italy) A Moratelli (Poland) K Piter	5	1
M Andreeva; D Shnaider	7	6
PR	(Serbia) A Krunić (Serbia) N Stojanović	2	5
WC	(Australia) K Birrell (Australia) O Gadecki	6	7
(Norway) U Eikeri (Japan) M Ninomiya	7^{9}	6
14	(Czech Republic) M Bouzková (United States) B Mattek-Sands	6^{7}	4
11	V Kudermetova (Japan) E Shibahara	6	6
WC	(Thailand) P Plipuech (Chinese Taipei) C-y Tsao	3	1
(Kazakhstan) Y Putintseva (China) Xiy Wang	2	6	5
(China) Xin Wang (China) S Zheng	6	3	7
(Slovakia) R Šramková (Bulgaria) V Tomova	6	7
(China) X Jiang (China) Y Wang	2	5
K Rakhimova (Spain) S Sorribes Tormo	6	6
8	(Kazakhstan) A Danilina; I Khromacheva	3	1

Second round
4	(Italy) S Errani (Italy) J Paolini	5	5
M Andreeva; D Shnaider	7	7
WC	(Australia) K Birrell (Australia) O Gadecki	6	7
(Norway) U Eikeri (Japan) M Ninomiya	3	5
11	V Kudermetova (Japan) E Shibahara	1	5
(China) Xin Wang (China) S Zheng	6	7
(Slovakia) R Šramková (Bulgaria) V Tomova	1	5
K Rakhimova (Spain) S Sorribes Tormo	6	7

Third round
M Andreeva; D Shnaider	6	6
WC	(Australia) K Birrell (Australia) O Gadecki	3	2
(China) Xin Wang (China) S Zheng	6	3	6^{8}
K Rakhimova (Spain) S Sorribes Tormo	3	6	7^{10}

Quarterfinals
M Andreeva; D Shnaider	6	6
K Rakhimova (Spain) S Sorribes Tormo	3	0

=== Bottom half ===
==== Section 3 ====
First round
6	(Belgium) E Mertens (Australia) E Perez	6	7
WC	(Australia) J Fourlis (Australia) P Hule	4	5
WC	(Australia) D Aiava (Australia) M Inglis	4	6^{2}
(Ukraine) M Kostyuk (Romania) E-G Ruse	6	7^{7}
(United States) B Pera (United States) S Santamaria	6	2	6
PR	(Austria) J Grabher (United Kingdom) T Moore	4	6	4
WC	(Australia) L Cabrera (Australia) T Preston	4	6^{4}
12	(China) H Guo; A Panova	6	7^{7}
13	(Hungary) T Babos (United States) N Melichar-Martinez	7^{7}	6
PR	(United States) H Baptiste (United States) C McNally	6^{2}	4
(Poland) K Kawa (Belgium) K Zimmermann	2	1
E Alexandrova (China) Y Yuan	6	6
PR	(China) Y Xu (China) Z Yang	4	6	6
(United States) A Parks (China) Q Tang	6	4	3
(Slovakia) T Mihalíková (United Kingdom) O Nicholls	5	2
3	(Chinese Taipei) S-w Hsieh (Latvia) J Ostapenko	7	6

Second round
6	(Belgium) E Mertens (Australia) E Perez	4	4
(Ukraine) M Kostyuk (Romania) E-G Ruse	6	6
(United States) B Pera (United States) S Santamaria	7	6^{1}	5
12	(China) H Guo; A Panova	5	7^{7}	7
13	(Hungary) T Babos (United States) N Melichar-Martinez	6	6
E Alexandrova (China) Y Yuan	3	4
PR	(China) Y Xu (China) Z Yang	4	4
3	(Chinese Taipei) S-w Hsieh (Latvia) J Ostapenko	6	6

Third round
(Ukraine) M Kostyuk (Romania) E-G Ruse	7	4	7^{10}
12	(China) H Guo; A Panova	5	6	6^{6}
13	(Hungary) T Babos (United States) N Melichar-Martinez	4	3
3	(Chinese Taipei) S-w Hsieh (Latvia) J Ostapenko	6	6

Quarterfinals
(Ukraine) M Kostyuk (Romania) E-G Ruse	2	7	5
3	(Chinese Taipei) S-w Hsieh (Latvia) J Ostapenko	6	5	7

==== Section 4 ====
First round
7	(United States) A Muhammad (Netherlands) D Schuurs	6	6
(Spain) J Bouzas Maneiro (Spain) Y Cavallé Reimers	3	2
A Blinkova (Chinese Taipei) F-h Wu	4	6	7^{10}
PR	(United Kingdom) J Burrage (Denmark) C Tauson	6	4	6^{8}
(Italy) E Cocciaretto; L Samsonova	6	6
(Hungary) A Bondár (Japan) M Uchijima	2	4
(Japan) M Kato (Mexico) R Zarazúa	6	6
10	(United States) S Kenin (Romania) M Niculescu	4	4
15	(Brazil) B Haddad Maia (Germany) L Siegemund	6	6
(United States) Q Gleason (Netherlands) S Lamens	1	3
(Poland) M Linette (Mexico) G Olmos	4	6	6^{7}
(Italy) L Bronzetti (Ukraine) A Kalinina	6	1	7^{10}
(France) V Gracheva (Georgia (country)) O Kalashnikova	4	5
(United Kingdom) M Lumsden (Czech Republic) A Sisková	6	7
(United States) D Collins (United States) D Krawczyk	6	4	3
2	(Canada) G Dabrowski (New Zealand) E Routliffe	4	6	6

Second round
7	(United States) A Muhammad (Netherlands) D Schuurs	6^{5}	7^{7}	6
A Blinkova (Chinese Taipei) F-h Wu	7^{7}	6^{4}	3
(Italy) E Cocciaretto; L Samsonova	6	3	3
(Japan) M Kato (Mexico) R Zarazúa	4	6	6
15	(Brazil) B Haddad Maia (Germany) L Siegemund	6	7^{7}
(Italy) L Bronzetti (Ukraine) A Kalinina	0	6^{5}
(United Kingdom) M Lumsden (Czech Republic) A Sisková	6	3	4
2	(Canada) G Dabrowski (New Zealand) E Routliffe	4	6	6

Third round
7	(United States) A Muhammad (Netherlands) D Schuurs	6	5	1
(Japan) M Kato (Mexico) R Zarazúa	4	7	6
15	(Brazil) B Haddad Maia (Germany) L Siegemund	7^{7}	3	4
2	(Canada) G Dabrowski (New Zealand) E Routliffe	6^{5}	6	6

Quarterfinals
(Japan) M Kato (Mexico) R Zarazúa	3	2
2	(Canada) G Dabrowski (New Zealand) E Routliffe	6	6

=== Seeded teams ===
The following are the seeded teams. Seedings are based on WTA rankings as of 6 January 2025.

Country	Player	Country	Player	Rank	Seed
CZE	Kateřina Siniaková	USA	Taylor Townsend	5	1
CAN	Gabriela Dabrowski	NZL	Erin Routliffe	5	2
TPE	Hsieh Su-wei	LAT	Jeļena Ostapenko	13	3
ITA	Sara Errani	ITA	Jasmine Paolini	19	4
TPE	Chan Hao-ching	UKR	Lyudmyla Kichenok	21	5
BEL	Elise Mertens	AUS	Ellen Perez	21	6
USA	Asia Muhammad	NED	Demi Schuurs	39	7
KAZ	Anna Danilina		Irina Khromacheva	41	8
FRA	Kristina Mladenovic	CHN	Zhang Shuai	53	9
USA	Sofia Kenin	ROU	Monica Niculescu	56	10
	Veronika Kudermetova	JPN	Ena Shibahara	63	11
CHN	Guo Hanyu		Alexandra Panova	67	12
HUN	Tímea Babos	USA	Nicole Melichar-Martinez	68	13
CZE	Marie Bouzková	USA	Bethanie Mattek-Sands	71	14
BRA	Beatriz Haddad Maia	GER	Laura Siegemund	75	15
CAN	Leylah Fernandez	UKR	Nadiia Kichenok	76	16

=== Other entry information ===
==== Wildcards ====
- (Australia) Destanee Aiava / (Australia) Maddison Inglis
- (Australia) Kimberly Birrell / (Australia) Olivia Gadecki
- (Australia) Lizette Cabrera / (Australia) Taylah Preston
- (Australia) Jaimee Fourlis / (Australia) Petra Hule
- (Australia) Talia Gibson / (Australia) Maya Joint
- (Australia) Priscilla Hon / (Australia) Daria Saville
- (Thailand) Peangtarn Plipuech / (Chinese Taipei) Tsao Chia-yi

==== Protected ranking ====
- (United States) Hailey Baptiste / (United States) Caty McNally
- (United Kingdom) Jodie Burrage / (Denmark) Clara Tauson
- (Austria) Julia Grabher / (United Kingdom) Tara Moore
- (Serbia) Aleksandra Krunić / (Serbia) Nina Stojanović
- (China) Xu Yifan / (China) Yang Zhaoxuan
