= Jodie Burrage =

British tennis player (born 1999)

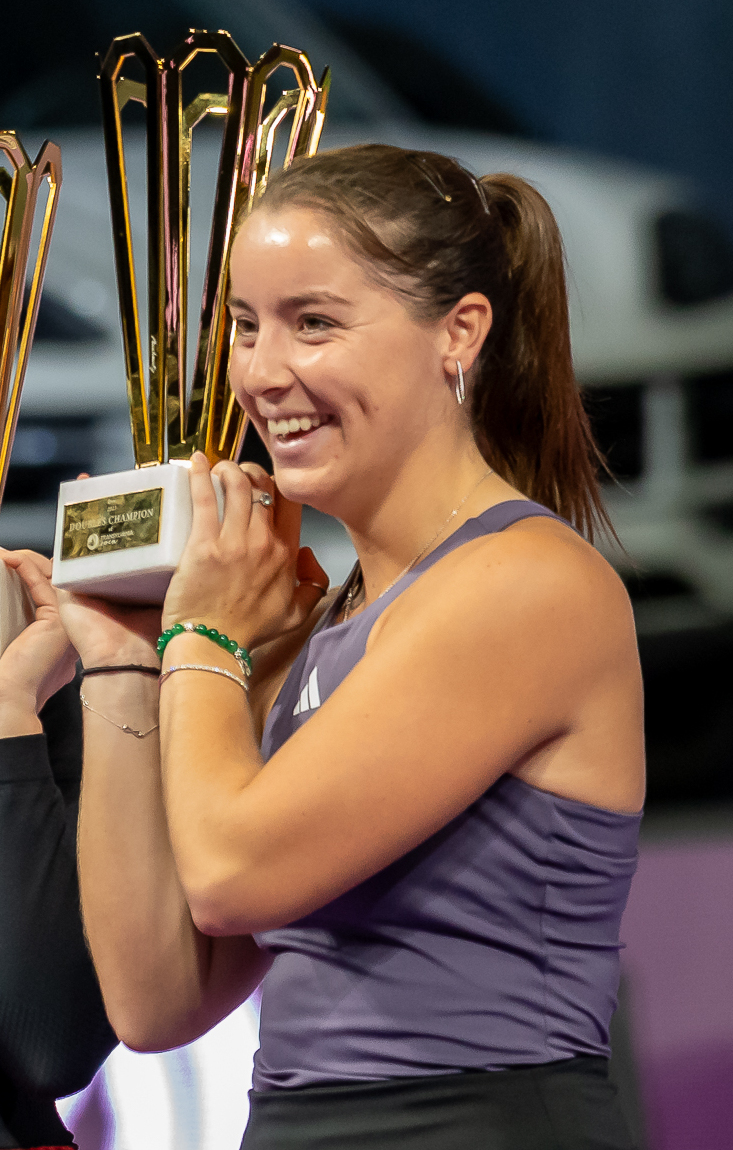
- Burrage at the 2023 Transylvania Open
- Full name: Jodie Anna Burrage
- Country (sports): Great Britain
- Residence: London, England
- Born: 28 May 1999 (age 27) Kingston upon Thames, London
- Height: 1.75 m (5 ft 9 in)
- Plays: Right-handed (two-handed backhand)
- Coach: Craig Veal
- Prize money: $1,489,106

Singles
- Career record: 284–206
- Career titles: 6 ITF
- Highest ranking: No. 85 (11 September 2023)
- Current ranking: No. 476 (9 November 2026)

Grand Slam singles results
- Australian Open: 2R (2025)
- French Open: 1R (2025)
- Wimbledon: 2R (2023)
- US Open: 2R (2023)

Doubles
- Career record: 98–73
- Career titles: 1 WTA, 1 WTA Challenger
- Highest ranking: No. 114 (14 July 2025)
- Current ranking: No. 370 (9 November 2026)

Grand Slam doubles results
- Australian Open: 1R (2025)
- French Open: 2R (2025)
- Wimbledon: 2R (2025)

Grand Slam mixed doubles results
- Wimbledon: 1R (2021, 2023, 2026)
- Last updated on: 10 November 2026.

Jodie Anna Burrage (born 28 May 1999) is a British tennis player. She has a career-high WTA singles ranking of No. 85, achieved on 11 September 2023, and a best doubles ranking of world No. 114, set on 14 July 2025. Burrage has won one doubles title on the WTA Tour and one doubles title on WTA 125 tournaments, along with six titles in singles and seven in doubles on the ITF Circuit.

== Early and personal life ==
Burrage was born in Kingston upon Thames and grew up in Hindhead, Surrey. She was first introduced to tennis through her mother. Burrage won a scholarship to Talbot Heath School in Bournemouth, which enabled her to develop her tennis at the nearby West Hants Club. Following the completion of GCSE exams Burrage relocated to Junior Tennis Coaching (JTC) in Chiswick, London, where she was guided by former tour professionals Colin Beecher and Lucie Ahl. Burrage was previously in a relationship with Scotland rugby union international Ben White. This ended in 2026.

== Career ==
=== 2020–2021: WTA Tour and majors debut ===
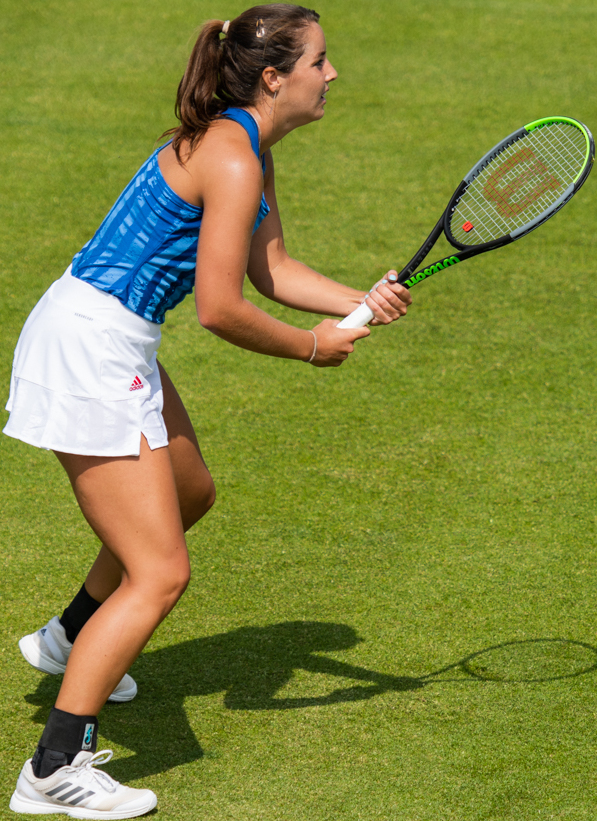
Burrage at the 2021 Nottingham Open

Burrage made her WTA Tour main-draw debut at the 2020 Linz Open, having received a wildcard into the doubles tournament, partnering Sabine Lisicki. But the pair had to retire in the first set of their opening match when Lisicki suffered an injury.

In January 2021, she made her WTA Tour main-draw debut in singles at the Abu Dhabi Open as a lucky loser. In June, she had her major main-draw debut, after being handed a wildcard to the 2021 Wimbledon Championships. She lost in the first round to Lauren Davis.

=== 2022: First top-5 win, top 150 debut ===
At the Eastbourne International, she defeated top seed and world No. 4, Paula Badosa. As a result, she made her top 150 debut in the WTA singles rankings. She ended the year at a career high ranking of 126 having improved 90 places during the season.

=== 2023: Maiden career singles final and doubles title, top 100 ===
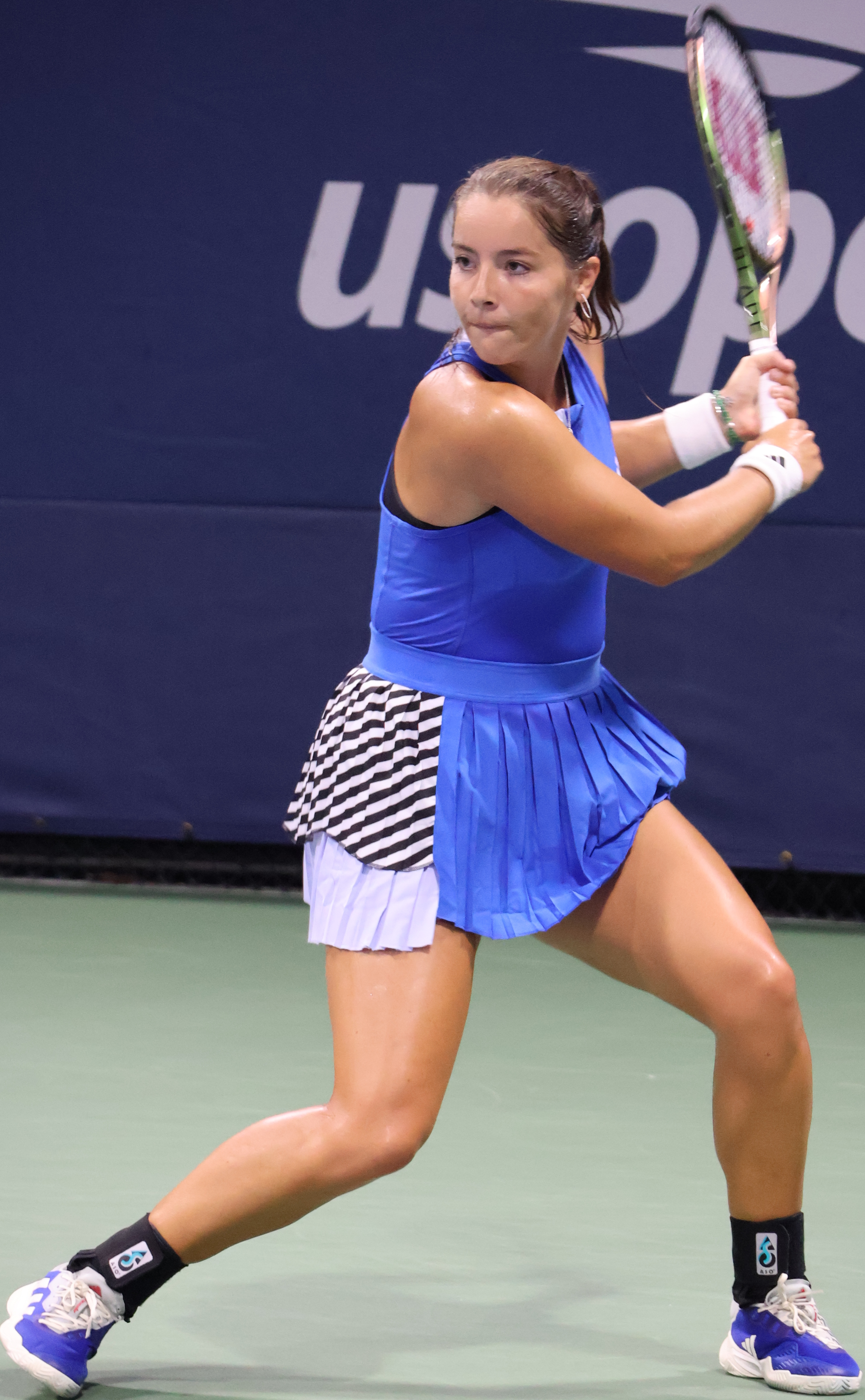
Burrage at the 2023 US Open

At the Nottingham Open, she reached her first WTA Tour quarterfinal defeating third seed Magda Linette. She then defeated another Polish player, Magdalena Fręch, to reach a WTA Tour semifinal for the first time in her career. Finally, she defeated Alizé Cornet to set up an all-British final with Katie Boulter, the first since 1977. Boulter won in straight sets.

At Wimbledon, she recorded her first major win defeating Caty McNally, before losing in round two to Daria Kasatkina, in straight sets. As a result, she reached the top 100 in the rankings for the first time.

Burrage won a round in the Poland Open against Ankita Raina, but lost in straight sets against Lucrezia Stefanini. She reached the quarterfinals at the Stanford WTA Challenger, beating Diana Shnaider and Kayla Day, before a narrow three-set loss to Moyuka Uchijima. At the same event, she won her first Challenger doubles title partnering Olivia Gadecki.

She achieved her first main-draw win at the US Open, defeating world No. 38, Anna Blinkova, before falling in straight sets to world No. 2, Aryna Sabalenka in the second round.

Burrage captured her maiden WTA Tour title winning the doubles with Jil Teichmann at the 2023 Transylvania Open, defeating Léolia Jeanjean and Valeriya Strakhova in straight sets in the final.

She made her debut for Great Britain's Billie Jean King Cup team in November 2023 in a play-off tie with Sweden held indoors at the Copper Box Arena in London. Playing world No. 372, Kajsa Rinaldo Persson in the opening match of the contest, she raced into a 4–0 lead in the first set only to lose 12 of the next 13 games to go down to a 4–6, 1–6 defeat. She was replaced by Harriet Dart for day two of the tie which Great Britain won 3–1.

=== 2024: WTA 500 quarterfinal, injuries ===
Burrage made her main-draw debut at the Australian Open in January 2024 going out in the first round to Tamara Korpatsch. At the Linz Open in Austria, she came through two qualifying rounds and then beat Varvara Gracheva and Jaqueline Cristian to reach her first WTA 500 event quarterfinal, before losing out to Jelena Ostapenko.

Burrage underwent surgery having suffered an injury to her left wrist while practicing prior to her defeat in the first round of qualifying at the San Diego Open. After recovering from the surgery, Burrage was set to return to action at the French Open in May for what would have been her first main-draw appearance at the clay-court event, but she was forced to pull out just days before the tournament began when she injured her ankle in practice. She subsequently announced the injury would force her to miss the entire grass-court season including Wimbledon.

Having missed six months of the season, Burrage returned to the competitive court in September in the qualifying stages at the Jasmin Open in Tunisia, winning her first match against Lina Soussi in straight sets. Partnering with Anastasia Tikhonova, Burrage won the doubles title at her second comeback tournament, the W100 Caldas da Rainha Open in Portugal, defeating third seeds Francisca Jorge and Matilde Jorge in straight sets in the final. Alongside Freya Christie, she won the doubles title at the W75 Glasgow event in October, also reaching the singles semifinals there.

In December, Burrage reached her first singles final of the year at the W75 Trnava event, losing to top seed Tatjana Maria. The following week, having received a wildcard entry, she went one step better, winning the biggest title of her career to date at the W100 Dubai Tennis Challenge, defeating top seed Polina Kudermetova in the final. As a result, Burrage re-entered the WTA top 200, gaining 59 places to world No. 179 on 9 December 2024.

=== 2025: Australian Open first win ===
Burrage started her 2025 season at the Auckland Open where she entered the main draw as a lucky loser and defeated wildcard entrant Vivian Yang in the first round, before losing her next match to Hailey Baptiste in a deciding set tiebreak.

Using her protected ranking to gain entry into the main draw at the Australian Open, she defeated qualifier Léolia Jeanjean to reach the second round, where she lost to third seed Coco Gauff.

In February, again using her protected ranking, Burrage entered the ATX Open, defeating Petra Kvitová in the first round, before losing to Ajla Tomljanović.

She received a late call-up to the Great Britain squad for the BJK Cup qualifying round held in the Hague in April. Burrage partnered Katie Boulter to defeat Suzan Lamens and Demi Schuurs in the decisive doubles as her team overcame the Netherlands to secure a place at the finals.

Once more using her protected ranking, Burrage made her main-draw debut at the French Open, but lost to Danielle Collins in the first round.

Moving onto the grass-court season, she was given a wildcard entry into the Queen's Club Championships in London, losing in the first round to eighth seed Amanda Anisimova, in three sets. Two weeks later at the Eastbourne Open, Burrage again entered the main draw having been handed a wildcard and defeated Moyuka Uchijima to reach the second round, where she lost to second seed Barbora Krejčíková in a match which went to a third set tiebreak. At Wimbledon, once more entering the main draw thanks to a wildcard, Burrage lost to Caty McNally in round one.

=== 2026: BJK Cup qualifier, return to WTA Tour ===
In April, having not played a competitive match since September 2025, Burrage was named as part of the Great Britain team for their BJK Cup qualifier against Australia in Melbourne. She teamed up with Harriet Dart to defeat Storm Hunter and Ellen Perez in the doubles to clinch the overall tie and secure Britain's progress to the finals. In November, at the Chennai Open, Burrage played her first WTA Tour main-draw singles match in 16 months, losing to wildcard entrant Vaishnavi Adkar. She revealed after the match, which she lost having won the first set and led 5–3 in the third, that she received death threats on social media.

== Performance timelines ==
Key
W	F	SF	QF	#R	RR	Q#	P#	DNQ	A	Z#	PO	G	S	B	NMS	NTI	P	NH

(W) winner; (F) finalist; (SF) semifinalist; (QF) quarterfinalist; (#R) rounds 4, 3, 2, 1; (RR) round-robin stage; (Q#) qualification round; (P#) preliminary round; (DNQ) did not qualify; (A) absent; (Z#) Davis/Fed Cup Zonal Group (with number indication) or (PO) play-off; (G) gold, (S) silver or (B) bronze Olympic/Paralympic medal; (NMS) not a Masters tournament; (NTI) not a Tier I tournament; (P) postponed; (NH) not held; (SR) strike rate (events won / competed); (W–L) win–loss record.
To avoid confusion and double counting, these charts are updated at the conclusion of a tournament or when the player's participation has ended.

Only main-draw results in WTA Tour, Grand Slam tournaments, Billie Jean King Cup, United Cup, Hopman Cup and Olympic Games are included in win–loss records.

=== Singles ===
Current through the 2024 WTA Tour.

Tournament	2021	2022	2023	2024	2025	2026	SR	W–L	Win %
Grand Slam tournaments
Australian Open	A	Q1	Q3	1R	2R	A	0 / 2	1–2	
French Open	Q1	A	A	A	1R	A	0 / 1	0–1	
Wimbledon	1R	1R	2R	A	1R	A	0 / 4	1–4	
US Open	Q2	Q1	2R	A	Q2	Q1	0 / 1	1–1	
Win–Loss	0–1	0–1	2–2	0–1	1–3	0–0	0 / 8	3–8	
WTA 1000 tournaments
Qatar Open	NTI	A	NTI	A	A	A	0 / 0	0–0	
Dubai Championships	A	NTI	A	A	A	A	0 / 0	0–0	
Indian Wells Open	A	A	Q1	A	Q1	A	0 / 0	0–0	
Miami Open	A	A	Q2	A	Q1	A	0 / 0	0–0	
Madrid Open	A	A	Q2	A	A	A	0 / 0	0–0	
Italian Open	A	A	A	A	A	A	0 / 0	0–0	
Canadian Open	A	A	Q1	A	Q1	A	0 / 0	0–0	
Cincinnati Open	A	A	A	A	Q1	A	0 / 0	0–0	
China Open	NH		Q1	A	A	Q2	0 / 0	0–0	
Win–Loss	0–0	0–0	0–0	0–0	0–0	0–0	0 / 0	0–0	
Career statistics
	2021	2022	2023	2024	2025	2026	SR	W–L	Win %
Tournaments	4	4	9	0			Career total: 17		
Titles	0	0	0	0	0	0	Career total: 0		
Finals	0	0	1	0	0	0	Career total: 1		
Hard win–loss	0–2	1–1	3–5	0–0			0 / 8	4–8	
Clay win–loss	0–0	0–0	0–0	0–0	0–0	0–0	0 / 0	0–0	
Grass win–loss	0–2	3–3	6–4	0–0			0 / 9	9–9	
Overall win–loss	0–4	4–4	9–9	0–0			0 / 17	13–17	
Year-end ranking (Note: 2017: WTA ranking–587, 2018: WTA ranking–411, 2019: WTA ranking–287, 2020: WTA ranking–260.)	221	127	93	179	160		$1,489,106		

=== Doubles ===
Current through the 2026 Wimbledon Championships.

Tournament	2020	2021	2022	2023	2024	2025	2026	SR	W–L	Win %
Grand Slam tournaments
Australian Open	A	A	A	A	A	1R	A	0 / 1	0–1	
French Open	A	A	A	A	A	2R	A	0 / 1	1–1	
Wimbledon	A	1R	1R	1R	A	2R	1R	0 / 5	1–5	
US Open	A	A	A	A	A	A	A	0 / 0	0–0	
Win–Loss	0–0	0–1	0–1	0–1	0–0	2–3	0–1	0 / 7	2–7	
Career statistics
Tournaments	1	3	2	2	0	0	0	Career total: 8		
Overall win–loss	0–1	0–3	0–2	0–2	0–0	2–3	0–1	0 / 12	2–12	
Year-end ranking	368	385	398	149	302	170				

== WTA Tour finals ==
=== Singles: 1 (runner-up) ===
Legend WTA 250 (0–1)	Finals by surface Grass (0–1)

Result	Date	Tournament	Tier	Surface	Opponent	Score
Loss	Jun 2023	Nottingham Open, UK	WTA 250	Grass	(United Kingdom) Katie Boulter	3–6, 3–6

=== Doubles: 1 (title) ===
Legend WTA 250 (1–0)	Finals by surface Hard (1–0)

Result	Date	Tournament	Tier	Surface	Partner	Opponents	Score
Win	Oct 2023	Transylvania Open, Romania	WTA 250	Hard (i)	(Switzerland) Jil Teichmann	(France) Léolia Jeanjean (Ukraine) Valeriya Strakhova	6–1, 6–4

== WTA 125 finals ==
=== Doubles: 1 (title) ===
Result	Date	Tournament	Surface	Partner	Opponents	Score
Win	Aug 2023	Golden Gate Open, US	Hard	(Australia) Olivia Gadecki	(United States) Hailey Baptiste (United States) Claire Liu	7–6^{(7–4)}, 6–7^{(6–8)}, [10–8]

== ITF Circuit finals ==
=== Singles: 16 (6 titles, 10 runner-ups) ===
Legend $100,000 tournaments (1–1) $60,000 tournaments (1–3) $25,000 tournaments (2–4) $15,000 tournaments (2–2)	Finals by surface Hard (5–9) Grass (0–1) Carpet (1–0)

Result	W–L	Date	Tournament	Tier	Surface	Opponent	Score
Loss	0–1	Mar 2017	ITF Sharm El Sheikh, Egypt	15,000	Hard	(Germany) Julia Wachaczyk	6–2, 3–6, 2–6
Win	1–1	Jul 2017	ITF Dublin, Ireland	15,000	Carpet	(Republic of Ireland) Sinéad Lohan	7–6^{(5)}, 6–4
Win	2–1	Mar 2018	ITF Sharm El Sheikh, Egypt	15,000	Hard	(United States) Nadja Gilchrist	6–2, 6–1
Loss	2–2	Feb 2019	ITF Jodhpur, India	W25	Hard	(Japan) Miharu Imanishi	3–6, 6–3, 3–6
Loss	2–3	Apr 2019	ITF Bolton, United Kingdom	W25	Hard	(Russia) Vitalia Diatchenko	2–6, 2–6
Win	3–3	May 2019	ITF Jerusalem, Israel	W25	Hard	(Latvia) Daniela Vismane	2–6, 6–2, 6–3
Loss	3–4	Jan 2020	ITF Monastir, Tunisia	W15	Hard	(France) Victoria Muntean	1–6, 6–0, 6–7^{(5)}
Loss	3–5	Sep 2020	ITF Montemor-o-Novo, Portugal	W25	Hard	(Brazil) Beatriz Haddad Maia	1–6, 4–6
Win	4–5	Apr 2021	ITF Dubai, United Arab Emirates	W25	Hard	(Belarus) Yuliya Hatouka	6–4, 6–3
Loss	4–6	Jul 2021	ITF Les Contamines-Montjoie, France	W25	Hard	(Switzerland) Ylena In-Albon	6–4, 5–7, 5–7
Loss	4–7	Jun 2022	Ilkley Trophy, United Kingdom	W100	Grass	(Hungary) Dalma Gálfi	5–7, 6–4, 3–6
Loss	4–8	Aug 2022	Lexington Challenger, United States	W60	Hard	(United Kingdom) Katie Swan	0–6, 6–3, 3–6
Loss	4–9	Jan 2023	Canberra International, Australia	W60	Hard	(United Kingdom) Katie Boulter	6–3, 3–6, 2–6
Win	5–9	Apr 2023	Open de Seine-et-Marne, France	W60	Hard (i)	(Italy) Lucia Bronzetti	3–6, 6–4, 6–0
Loss	5–10	Dec 2024	Trnava Indoor, Slovakia	W60	Hard (i)	(Germany) Tatjana Maria	4–6, 1–6
Win	6–10	Dec 2024	Dubai Tennis Challenge, U.A.E.	W100	Hard	(Russia) Polina Kudermetova	6–3, 6–3

=== Doubles: 13 (9 titles, 4 runner-ups) ===
Legend W100 tournaments (1–0) W60 tournaments (1–2) W25/35 tournaments (4–1) W15 tournaments (3–1)	Finals by surface Hard (9–4)

Result	W–L	Date	Tournament	Tier	Surface	Partner	Opponents	Score
Win	1–0	Nov 2017	ITF Sharm El Sheikh, Egypt	W15	Hard	(United Kingdom) Freya Christie	(Sweden) Linnéa Malmqvist (South Korea) Park Sang-hee	7–5, 3–6, [13–11]
Win	2–0	Nov 2017	ITF Sharm El Sheikh, Egypt	W15	Hard	(United Kingdom) Freya Christie	(Thailand) Watsachol Sawatdee (Thailand) Chanikarn Silakul	6–4, 7–5
Loss	2–1	Mar 2018	ITF Sharm El Sheikh, Egypt	W15	Hard	(Sweden) Jacqueline Cabaj Awad	(Thailand) Kamonwan Buayam (Russia) Angelina Gabueva	5–7, 7–5, [7–10]
Win	3–1	Apr 2019	ITF Bolton, United Kingdom	W25	Hard	(United Kingdom) Alicia Barnett	(Romania) Laura Ioana Paar (Belgium) Hélène Scholsen	6–3, 6–3
Loss	3–2	May 2019	ITF Les Franqueses del Vallès, Spain	W60	Hard	(United Kingdom) Olivia Nicholls	(France) Jessika Ponchet (United Kingdom) Eden Silva	3–6, 4–6
Win	4–2	Jan 2020	ITF Monastir, Tunisia	W15	Hard	(Slovakia) Tereza Mihalíková	(France) Mallaurie Noël (Finland) Oona Orpana	6–1, 6–2
Loss	4–3	Sep 2020	ITF Montemor-o-Novo, Portugal	W25	Hard	(United Kingdom) Olivia Nicholls	(Spain) Marina Bassols Ribera (Romania) Ioana Loredana Roșca	6–7^{(5)}, 6–4, [6–10]
Win	5–3	May 2021	ITF Salinas, Ecuador	W25	Hard	(New Zealand) Paige Hourigan	(Portugal) Francisca Jorge (Sweden) Jacqueline Cabaj Awad	6–2, 2–6, [10–8]
Loss	5–4	Apr 2023	Open de Seine-et-Marne, France	W60	Hard (i)	(Turkey) Berfu Cengiz	(Belgium) Yanina Wickmayer (Belgium) Greet Minnen	4–6, 4–6
Win	6–4	Sep 2024	Caldas da Rainha Open, Portugal	W100	Hard	(Russia) Anastasia Tikhonova	(Portugal) Francisca Jorge (Portugal) Matilde Jorge	7–6^{(3)}, 6–4
Win	7–4	Oct 2024	GB Pro-Series Glasgow, UK	W75	Hard (i)	(United Kingdom) Freya Christie	(Georgia (country)) Mariam Bolkvadze (Netherlands) Isabelle Haverlag	6–4, 3–6, [10–5]
Win	8–4	Aug 2026	ITF Aldershot, United Kingdom	W35	Hard	(United Kingdom) Freya Christie	(United Kingdom) Daniella Britton (United Kingdom) Savannah Dada-Masco	6–7^{(4)}, 6–3, [11–9]
Win	9–4	Oct 2026	ITF Birmingham, United Kingdom	W35	Hard (i)	(Australia) Lizette Cabrera	(United Kingdom) Victoria Allen (Netherlands) Stéphanie Visscher	6–4, 7–5

== Wins against top 10 players ==
- She has a 1–3 record against players who were, at the time the match was played, ranked in the top 10.

No.	Player	Rk	Event	Surface	Rd	Score	Rk	Years	Ref
1	(Spain) Paula Badosa	4	Eastbourne International, UK	Grass	2R	6–4, 6–3	169	2022	

- Key: (Rk) first use, opponent rank; (Rd) round; (Rk) 2nd use, player rank; (Ref) reference; (F) final; (SF) semifinal; (QF) quarterfinal; (#R) rounds 4, 3, 2, 1; (RR) round-robin stage; (Q#) qualifying rounds or stages (3), 2, 1.
