= Kamilla Rakhimova =

Uzbekistani tennis player (born 2001)

Kamilla Rakhimova Камилла Рахимова
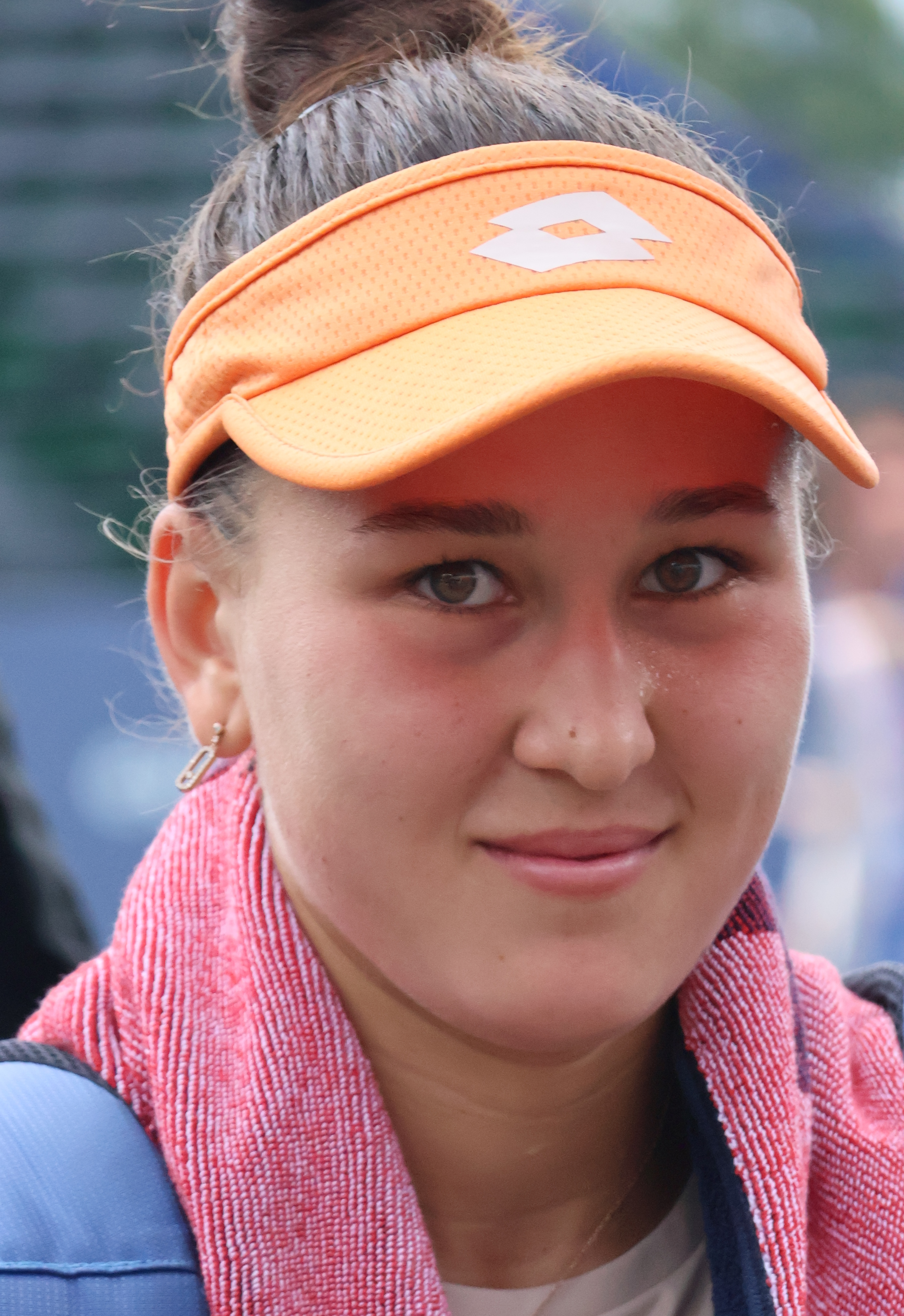
- Rakhimova in 2024
- Full name: Kamilla Stanislavovna Rakhimova
- Country (sports): Russia (2019–2025); Uzbekistan (Dec 2025–)
- Born: 28 August 2001 (age 25) Yekaterinburg, Russia
- Height: 1.70 m (5 ft 7 in)
- Plays: Right (two-handed backhand)
- Prize money: US$ 4,253,336

Singles
- Career record: 278–217
- Career titles: 2 WTA 125
- Highest ranking: No. 44 (2 November 2026)
- Current ranking: No. 45 (16 November 2026)

Grand Slam singles results
- Australian Open: 2R (2024)
- French Open: 3R (2023)
- Wimbledon: 3R (2025)
- US Open: 3R (2021, 2026)

Doubles
- Career record: 131–100
- Career titles: 4
- Highest ranking: No. 51 (25 August 2025)
- Current ranking: No. 176 (16 November 2026)

Grand Slam doubles results
- Australian Open: QF (2025)
- French Open: 3R (2025)
- Wimbledon: 2R (2024, 2025)
- US Open: 3R (2023)
- Last updated on: 22 November 2026.

Kamilla Stanislavovna Rakhimova (Russian: Камилла Станиславовна Рахимова, IPA: [kɐˈmʲiɫə rɐˈxʲiməvə]; born 28 August 2001) is an Uzbekistani professional tennis player. She has a career-high WTA singles ranking of No. 44, achieved on 2 November 2026, and a best doubles ranking of No. 51, attained on 25 August 2025.

Rakhimova has won four doubles titles on the WTA Tour, along with two doubles titles on WTA 125 tournaments as well as two WTA 125 singles titles.

== Career ==
=== 2019–2020: WTA Tour debut ===
Rakhimova made her WTA Tour debut at the 2019 Baltic Open where she received a wildcard for the main draw but lost to Latvian wildcard entrant Diāna Marcinkēviča.

She made her major debut as a qualifier at the 2020 French Open, and defeated Shelby Rogers in the first round. Rakhimova lost to 20th seed Maria Sakkari in her next match.

=== 2021: Two career doubles titles ===
Partnering Ankita Raina, Rakhimova won her first WTA Tour doubles title at the Phillip Island Trophy, defeating Anna Blinkova and Anastasia Potapova in the final.

She entered the US Open as a lucky loser and defeated Kristina Mladenovic and 32nd seed Ekaterina Alexandrova, to make the singles third round at a Grand Slam tournament for the first time in her career. Rakhimova then lost to eighth seed Barbora Krejčíková in straight sets.

Rakhimova won her second WTA Tour doubles title at the Upper Austria Ladies Linz, partnering Natela Dzalamidze. As a result, she moved 26 positions up into the top 70 in doubles, on 15 November 2021.

=== 2022–2024: First WTA 125 singles title, top 60 ===
Following a semifinal showing at the 2022 Copa Colsanitas, where she defeated second seed Beatriz Haddad Maia en route, but lost to defending champion Tatjana Maria, she reached the top 100 at world No. 96, on 11 April 2022.

She qualified for the 2023 Monterrey Open and defeated sixth seed Kateřina Siniaková, before losing to Ysaline Bonaventure. As a result, she rose to world No. 89 on 6 March 2023. She made back to back semifinals at the 2023 Copa Colsanitas but lost to Peyton Stearns.

At the 2023 French Open, she reached her second major third round but lost to Aryna Sabalenka, in straight sets. Despite the result, she climbed to world No. 65 on 12 June 2023.

In July 2023, Rakhimova made her debut at Wimbledon but lost to Cristina Bucșa. She was runner-up at the WTA 125 2023 Golden Gate Open, losing to Wang Yafan in the final. At the 2023 US Open, she reached the third round in doubles, partnering Elina Avanesyan as an alternate pair, defeating 10th seeded pair of Jeļena Ostapenko and Lyudmyla Kichenok, but lost to eight seeds Hsieh Su-wei and Wang Xinyu.

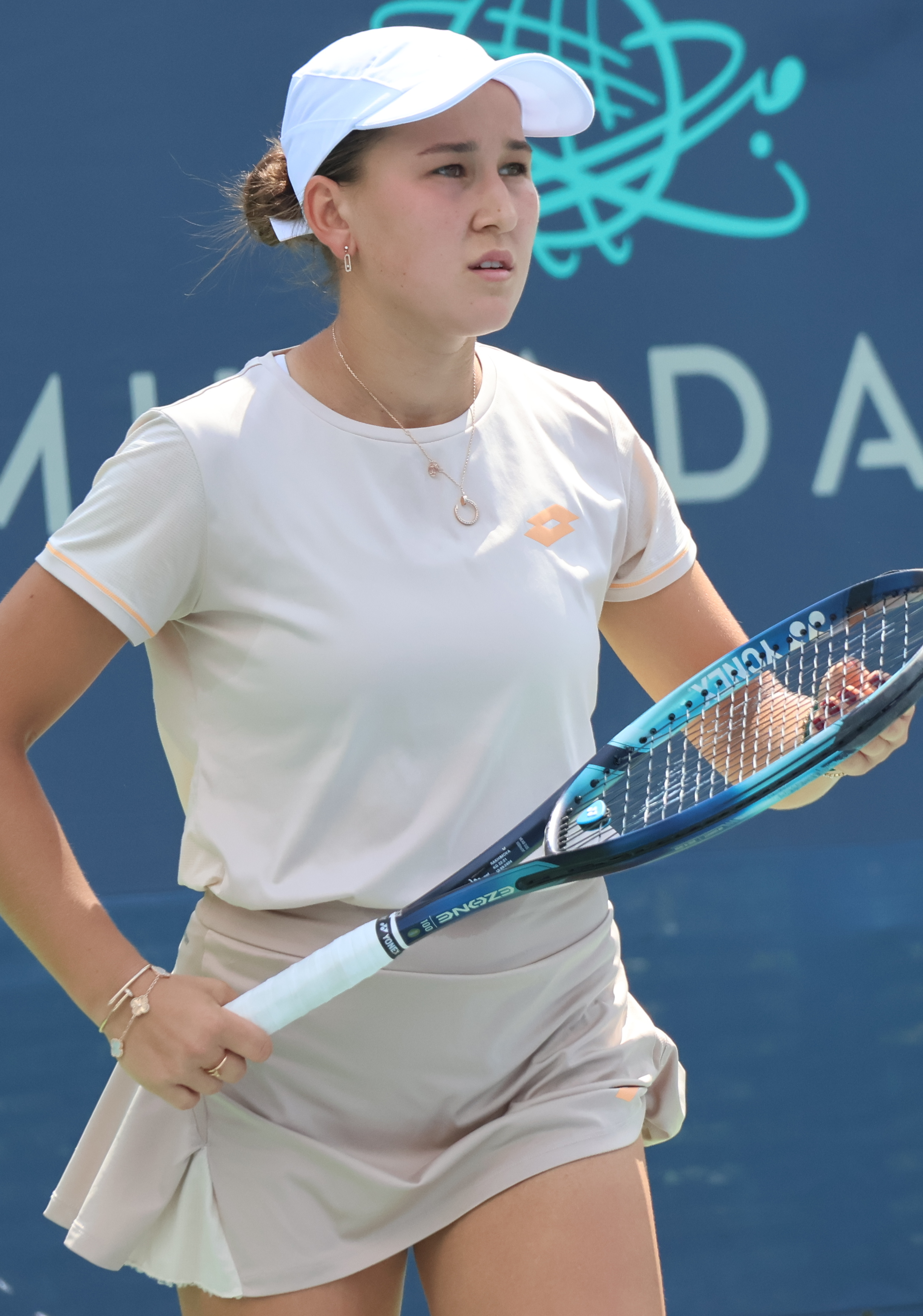
Rakhimova at the 2024 Washington Open.

She made the quarterfinals, for a third successive year, at the 2024 Copa Colsanitas. Rakhimova reached the semifinals at the Rabat Grand Prix but lost to Mayar Sherif.

At the 2024 US Open, she again entered the main draw as a lucky loser, but was defeated in the first round to top seed Iga Świątek.

Seeded fifth, Rakhimova won her first WTA 125 title at Guadalajara defeating qualifier Samantha Murray Sharan, Taylah Preston, second seed Martina Trevisan, Emiliana Arango and fourth seed Tatjana Maria.

At the Guadalajara Open, she advanced to her first WTA 500 quarterfinal when third seed Viktoria Azarenka retired, before losing to Camila Osorio. At the same tournament, partnering Oksana Kalashnikova, she reached the final, losing to Anna Danilina and Irina Khromacheva.

Rakhimova entered the main draw of the WTA 1000 China Open as a lucky loser making her debut at this tournament and defeating Kimberly Birrell in the first round in a rematch of the final qualifying round which she had lost. She was eliminated in the second round by fifth seed Zheng Qinwen.

=== 2025–2026: Second WTA 125 title, Wimbledon third round ===
Having entered the main draw as a qualifier, Rakhimova reached the quarterfinals at the 2025 Eastbourne Open, defeating fellow qualifier Elisabetta Cocciaretto and sixth seed Peyton Stearns, before losing to Anastasia Pavlyuchenkova in three sets. The following week, she made it into the third round at Wimbledon for the first time, with wins over Aoi Ito and fourth seed Jasmine Paolini. Her run was ended by 30th seed Linda Nosková. In December 2025, she won her second WTA 125 singles title at the Open Angers Arena Loire, defeating Tamara Korpatsch in the final.

In February 2026, Rakhimova won her fourth WTA Tour doubles title at the Transylvania Open, teaming with Sara Sorribes Tormo to overcome Wang Xinyu and Zheng Saisai in the final.

== National representation ==
On 28 November 2025, it was announced that Rakhimova had changed her sporting nationality from Russia to Uzbekistan.

== Personal life ==
Rakhimova is of Volga Tatar and Bashkir descent; her mother is from Uzbekistan, while her father is from Ufa. Her mother Rufina Rakhimova (née Yalalova) was a youth tennis player for the Uzbek SSR. She has an elder brother named Timur, who was born in Tashkent, while Kamilla herself was born in Yekaterinburg.

== Performance timelines ==
Key
W	F	SF	QF	#R	RR	Q#	DNQ	A	NH

(W) winner; (F) finalist; (SF) semifinalist; (QF) quarterfinalist; (#R) rounds 4, 3, 2, 1; (RR) round-robin stage; (Q#) qualification round; (DNQ) did not qualify; (A) absent; (NH) not held; (SR) strike rate (events won / competed); (W–L) win–loss record.
To avoid confusion and double counting, these charts are updated at the conclusion of a tournament or when the player's participation has ended.

Only main-draw results in WTA Tour, Grand Slam tournaments, Billie Jean King Cup, United Cup, Hopman Cup and Olympic Games are included in win–loss records.

=== Singles ===
Current through the 2026 US Open.

Tournament	2019	2020	2021	2022	2023	2024	2025	2026	SR	W–L	Win%
Grand Slam tournaments
Australian Open	A	Q1	Q3	Q3	1R	2R	1R	1R	0 / 4	1–4	20%
French Open	A	2R	Q1	1R	3R	1R	1R	2R	0 / 6	4–6	40%
Wimbledon	A	NH	Q2	A (Note: Suspended due to politics.)	1R	Q2	3R	2R	0 / 3	3–3	50%
US Open	A	A	3R	1R	1R	1R	1R	3R	4/6	4–6	40%
Win–Loss	0–0	1–1	2–1	0–2	2–4	1–3	2–4	4–4	0 / 18	12–19	39%
WTA 1000 tournaments
Qatar Open	NTI	A	NTI	Q1	NTI	Q2	Q1	A	0 / 0	0–0	–
Dubai Championships	A	NTI	Q2	NTI	A	Q2	Q2	1R	0 / 1	0–1	0%
Indian Wells Open	A	NH	A	Q1	Q1	Q1	1R	2R	0 / 2	1–2	33%
Miami Open	A	NH	A	Q1	Q1	Q1	1R	2R	0 / 2	1–2	33%
Madrid Open	A	NH	A	Q2	Q2	Q1	Q1	1R	0 / 1	0–1	0%
Italian Open	A	A	A	A	1R	Q1	2R	1R	0 / 3	1–3	25%
Canadian Open	A	NH	Q2	A	A	A	2R	3R	0 / 2	3–2	60%
Cincinnati Open	A	A	A	A	A	Q1	1R	2R	0 / 2	1–2	33%
China Open	A	Not held			Q2	2R	2R	3R	0 / 3	4–3	57%
Wuhan Open	A	Not held				2R	Q1	Q2	0 / 1	1–1	50%
Win–Loss	0–0	0–0	0–0	0–0	0–1	2–2	3–6	7–8	0 / 15	12–17	41%
Career statistics
	2019	2020	2021	2022	2023	2024	2025	2026	SR	W–L	Win%
Tournaments	1	1	10	12	14	14	20	10	Career total: 82		
Titles	0	0	0	0	0	0	0	0	Career total: 0		
Finals	0	0	0	0	0	0	0	0	Career total: 0		
Overall win-loss	0–1	1–1	5–10	8–12	9–14	15–14	10–20	6–10	0 / 82	54–82	40%
Year-end ranking (Note: 2018: WTA ranking–890.)	201	155	117	93	95	64	110	45	$4,253,336		

=== Doubles ===
Tournament	2022	2023	2024	2025	2026	SR	W–L	Win %
Australian Open	1R	A	A	QF	2R	0 / 3	4–3	57%
French Open	1R	1R	1R	3R	1R	0 / 5	2–5	29%
Wimbledon	A	1R	2R	2R	1R	0 / 4	2–4	33%
US Open	1R	3R	2R	1R	A	0 / 4	3–4	43%
Win–Loss	0–3	2–3	2–3	6–4	1–3	0 / 16	11–16	41%

== WTA Tour finals ==
=== Doubles: 8 (4 titles, 4 runner-ups) ===
Legend WTA 500 (0–1) WTA 250 (4–3)	Finals by surface Hard (3–2) Clay (1–2)	Finals by setting Outdoor (2–3) Indoor (2–1)

Result	W–L	Date	Tournament	Tier	Surface	Partner	Opponents	Score
Win	1–0	Feb 2021	Phillip Island Trophy, Australia	WTA 250	Hard	(India) Ankita Raina	(Russia) Anna Blinkova (Russia) Anastasia Potapova	2–6, 6–4, [10–7]
Loss	1–1	Jul 2021	Palermo Ladies Open, Italy	WTA 250	Clay	(Russia) Natela Dzalamidze	(New Zealand) Erin Routliffe (Belgium) Kimberley Zimmermann	6–7^{(5)}, 6–4, [4–10]
Win	2–1	Nov 2021	Ladies Linz, Austria	WTA 250	Hard (i)	(Russia) Natela Dzalamidze	(China) Wang Xinyu (China) Zheng Saisai	6–4, 6–2
Loss	2–2	Apr 2022	İstanbul Cup, Turkey	WTA 250	Clay	(Russia) Natela Dzalamidze	(Czech Republic) Marie Bouzková (Spain) Sara Sorribes Tormo	3–6, 4–6
Loss	2–3	Oct 2022	Transylvania Open, Romania	WTA 250	Hard (i)	(Russia) Yana Sizikova	(Belgium) Kirsten Flipkens (Germany) Laura Siegemund	3–6, 5–7
Win	3–3	Apr 2024	Copa Colsanitas, Colombia	WTA 250	Clay	(Spain) Cristina Bucșa	(Hungary) Anna Bondár (Russia) Irina Khromacheva	7–6^{(5)}, 3–6, [10–8]
Loss	3–4	Sep 2024	Guadalajara Open, Mexico	WTA 500	Hard	(Georgia (country)) Oksana Kalashnikova	(Kazakhstan) Anna Danilina (Russia) Irina Khromacheva	6–2, 5–7, [7–10]
Win	4–4	Feb 2026	Transylvania Open, Romania	WTA 250	Hard (i)	(Spain) Sara Sorribes Tormo	(China) Wang Xinyu (China) Zheng Saisai	7–6^{(7)}, 6–3

== WTA 125 finals ==
=== Singles: 3 (2 titles, 1 runner-up) ===
Result	W–L	Date	Tournament	Surface	Opponent	Score
Loss	0–1	Aug 2023	Golden Gate Open, United States	Hard	(China) Wang Yafan	2–6, 0–6
Win	1–1	Sep 2024	Guadalajara 125 Open, Mexico	Hard	(Germany) Tatjana Maria	6–3, 6–7^{(5–7)}, 6–3
Win	2–1	Dec 2025	Open Angers Arena Loire, France	Hard	(Germany) Tamara Korpatsch	6–3, 7–6^{(7–4)}

=== Doubles: 4 (2 titles, 2 runner-ups) ===
Result	W–L	Date	Tournament	Surface	Partner	Opponents	Score
Loss	0–1	Jul 2021	Bastad Open, Sweden	Clay	(Slovakia) Tereza Mihalíková	(Sweden) Mirjam Björklund (Switzerland) Leonie Küng	7–5, 3–6, [5–10]
Win	1–1	Oct 2022	Open de Rouen, France	Hard (i)	(Georgia (country)) Natela Dzalamidze	(Japan) Misaki Doi (Georgia (country)) Oksana Kalashnikova	6–2, 7–5
Win	2–1	Oct 2023	Guadalajara 125 Open, Mexico	Hard	(Russia) Anastasia Tikhonova	(United States) Sabrina Santamaria (United Kingdom) Heather Watson	7–6^{(7–5)}, 6–2
Loss	2–2	Sep 2025	Guadalajara 125 Open, Mexico	Hard	(Russia) Irina Khromacheva	(Russia) Maria Kozyreva (Belarus) Iryna Shymanovich	3–6, 4–6

== ITF Circuit finals ==
=== Singles: 11 (8 titles, 3 runner-ups) ===
Legend
W60 tournaments (3–1)
W25 tournaments (3–2)
W15 tournaments (2–0)

Result	W–L	Date	Tournament	Tier	Surface	Opponent	Score
Win	1–0	Feb 2019	ITF Shymkent, Kazakhstan	W15	Hard	(Russia) Anastasia Tikhonova	6–2, 6–3
Win	2–0	Apr 2019	ITF Shymkent, Kazakhstan	W15	Hard	(Serbia) Tamara Čurović	6–2, 7–5
Win	3–0	Apr 2019	ITF Andijan, Uzbekistan	W25	Hard	(India) Pranjala Yadlapalli	0–6, 6–1, 6–3
Win	4–0	Jun 2019	Fergana Challenger, Uzbekistan	W25	Hard	(Russia) Valeriya Yushchenko	6–1, 7–5
Loss	4–1	Sep 2019	ITF Penza, Russia	W25+H	Hard	(Russia) Vitalia Diatchenko	4–6, 1–6
Win	5–1	Oct 2019	ITF İstanbul, Turkey	W25	Hard (i)	(Turkey) Pemra Özgen	6–3, 5–7, 6–3
Loss	5–2	Feb 2020	ITF Moscow, Russia	W25	Hard (i)	(Russia) Ekaterina Kazionova	4–6, 6–1, 6–7^{(5)}
Loss	5–3	Apr 2021	Zagreb Ladies Open, Croatia	W60	Clay	(Ukraine) Anhelina Kalinina	1–6, 3–6
Win	6–3	Aug 2022	Bronx Open, United States	W60	Hard	(Sweden) Mirjam Björklund	6–2, 6–3
Win	7–3	Nov 2022	Open Nantes Atlantique, France	W60	Hard (i)	(China) Wang Xinyu	6–4, 6–4
Win	8–3	Feb 2023	Guanajuato Open, Mexico	W60+H	Hard	(Cyprus) Raluca Șerban	6–0, 1–6, 6–2

=== Doubles: 9 (6 titles, 3 runner-ups) ===
Legend
W80 tournaments (0–1)
W60 tournaments (2–0)
W25 tournaments (2–1)
W15 tournaments (2–1)

Result	W–L	Date	Tournament	Tier	Surface	Partner	Opponents	Score
Loss	0–1	Apr 2018	ITF Antalya, Turkey	W15	Clay	(Czech Republic) Kateřina Vaňková	(Japan) Haruna Arakawa (Italy) Federica Bilardo	6–4, 4–6, [8–10]
Loss	0–2	Jun 2018	Fergana Challenger, Uzbekistan	W25	Hard	(Russia) Sofya Lansere	(Russia) Anastasia Frolova (Russia) Ekaterina Yashina	1–6, 6–7^{(4)}
Win	1–2	Sep 2018	ITF Shymkent, Kazakhstan	W15	Hard	(Poland) Anna Hertel	(Russia) Ulyana Ayzatulina (Russia) Anna Iakovleva	6–0, 7–6^{(0)}
Win	2–2	Apr 2019	ITF Shymkent, Kazakhstan	W15	Hard	(Moldova) Vitalia Stamat	(South Korea) Lee Eun-hye (Uzbekistan) Sevil Yuldasheva	6–3, 7–6^{(4)}
Loss	2–3	Jul 2019	President's Cup, Kazakhstan	W80	Hard	(Russia) Vlada Koval	(Czech Republic) Marie Bouzková (Germany) Vivian Heisen	6–7^{(7)}, 1–6
Win	3–3	Aug 2019	ITF Penza, Russia	W25	Hard	(Russia) Vlada Koval	(Russia) Anastasia Gasanova (Ukraine) Ganna Poznikhirenko	6–0, 6–3
Win	4–3	Sep 2019	Meitar Open, Israel	W60	Hard	(Russia) Sofya Lansere	(Russia) Anastasia Gasanova (Ukraine) Valeriya Strakhova	4–6, 6–4, [10–3]
Win	5–3	Feb 2020	Cairo Open, Egypt	W60	Hard	(Ukraine) Marta Kostyuk	(Ukraine) Anastasiya Shoshyna (Poland) Paula Kania	6–3, 2–6, [10–6]
Win	6–3	Feb 2020	ITF Moscow, Russia	W25	Hard (i)	(Russia) Sofya Lansere	(Russia) Natela Dzalamidze (Greece) Valentini Grammatikopoulou	6–1, 3–6, [10–6]
