= Olivia Gadecki =

Australian tennis player (born 2002)

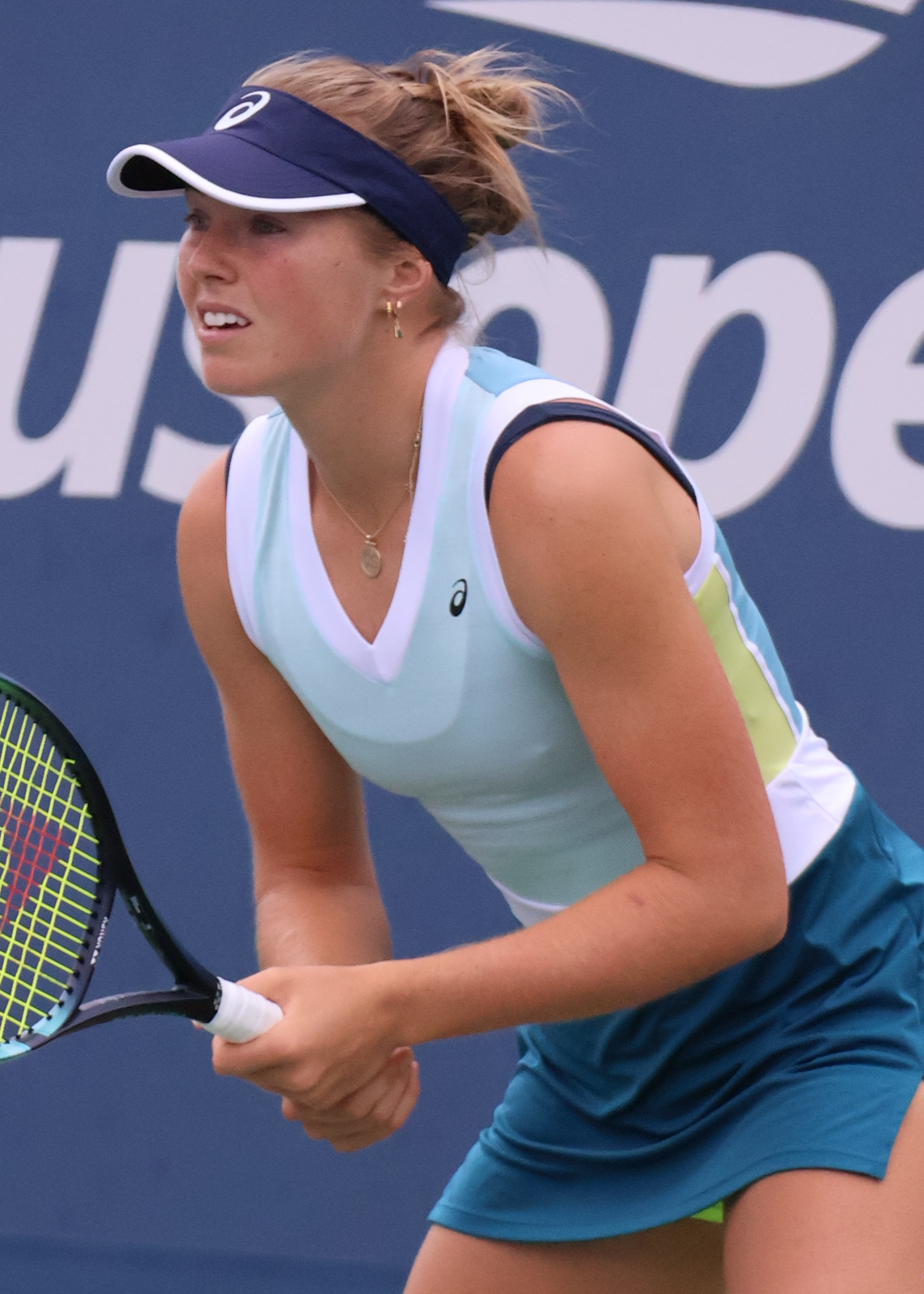
- Gadecki at the 2023 US Open
- Country (sports): Australia
- Residence: London, England, UK
- Born: 24 April 2002 (age 24) Gold Coast, Queensland, Australia
- Plays: Right-handed
- Prize money: $1,932,586

Singles
- Career record: 223–142
- Career titles: 0 WTA, 3 ITF
- Highest ranking: No. 83 (7 October 2024)
- Current ranking: No. 478 (16 November 2026)

Grand Slam singles results
- Australian Open: 2R (2023)
- French Open: 1R (2025)
- Wimbledon: 1R (2024, 2025)
- US Open: 1R (2023)

Other tournaments
- Olympic Games: 1R (2024)

Doubles
- Career record: 130–64
- Career titles: 1 WTA, 2 WTA Challenger
- Highest ranking: No. 52 (8 December 2025)
- Current ranking: No. 269 (16 November 2026)

Grand Slam doubles results
- Australian Open: 3R (2025)
- French Open: 1R (2022, 2025)
- Wimbledon: SF (2025)
- US Open: 1R (2024, 2025)

Other doubles tournaments
- Olympic Games: 1R (2024)

Grand Slam mixed doubles results
- Australian Open: W (2025, 2026)
- Last updated on: 21 November 2026.

Olivia Gadecki (/ɡəˈdɛtskiː/; born 24 April 2002) is an Australian professional tennis player. She has a career-high singles ranking by the WTA of No. 83, achieved on 7 October 2024, and a best doubles ranking of No. 52, reached on 8 December 2025. She won two mixed doubles titles in the 2025 and 2026 editions of the Australian Open with compatriot John Peers.

== Early life ==
Gadecki was born and raised on the Gold Coast into a family with a single mother and five brothers. She started playing tennis at three years old in Palm Beach on the Gold Coast. Gadecki is of Polish descent on both sides of her family. She was considered a prodigious tennis talent as a junior and at the age of 12 was one of just 16 players from around the world invited to take part in the Longines Future Tennis Aces competition in Paris on the eve of the 2014 French Open. Gadecki quit playing tennis shortly afterwards, and was ultimately encouraged by fellow Australian Ash Barty to return to the sport after completing high school. Gadecki attended Southport State High School throughout her teenage years.

== Career ==
=== 2016–2020: First steps ===
Gadecki made her main-draw debut on the ITF Circuit in Brisbane, in September 2016.

=== 2021: WTA Tour debut ===
In January 2021, Gadecki made the second round of the Australian Open qualifying. She was awarded a wildcard into the Gippsland Trophy, where she made her WTA Tour main-draw debut.

In February, Gadecki won her first WTA Tour singles main-draw match at the Phillip Island Trophy. She followed this up with her first top-10 win, defeating the top seed, former Australian Open champion and world No. 4, Sofia Kenin. With Gadecki's career-high ranking being No. 988 in the world, this was Kenin's worst defeat by ranking on the WTA Tour. Gadecki lost in the third round. The following week, she re-entered the WTA rankings at No. 642. In May 2021, Gadecki won her first professional singles title in Turkey.

In August 2021, she won the women's singles and doubles titles at Vigo, Spain. It was her second singles title and fifth doubles title.

On 20 September 2021, Gadecki debuted in the Australian top 10 in singles and doubles rankings. She ended the year with a singles ranking of No. 238.

=== 2022: Top 200 ===
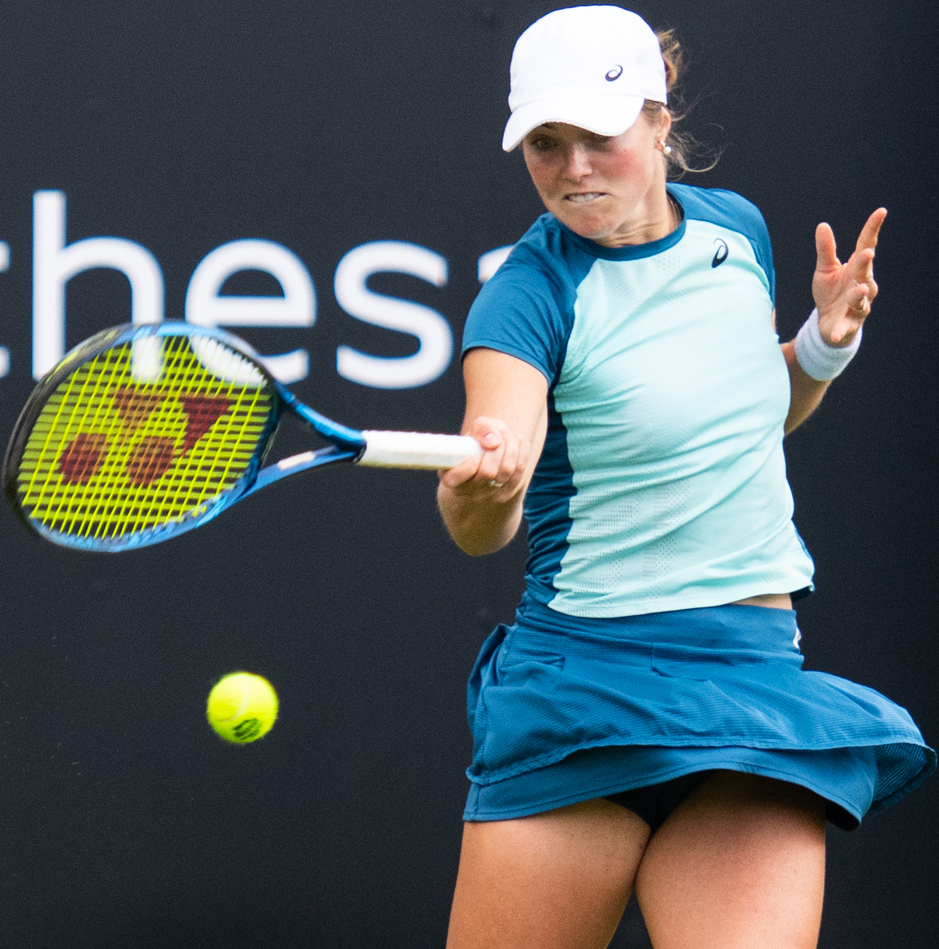
Gadecki at the 2022 Birmingham Classic qualifying

Gadecki did not enter the 2022 Australian Open due to the requirement for all players to be vaccinated against COVID-19.

In April 2022, Gadecki broke into the top 200, after reaching three finals from four Australian Pro Tour appearances.

=== 2023: Australian Open debut, first WTA 125 doubles title ===
Gadecki made her debut at the Australian Open as a wildcard entrant and defeated Polina Kudermetova in the first round before losing her next match to Marta Kostyuk.

Partnering Jodie Burrage, she won her first WTA 125 doubles title at the Golden Gate Open, defeating Hailey Baptiste and Claire Liu in the final.

=== 2024: Olympics in singles & doubles, WTA Tour final, top 100, Australian No. 1 ===
She reached a career-high ranking at world No. 120 on 15 January 2024, prior to the 2024 Australian Open where she received a wildcard for the main draw, losing to Sloane Stephens.

Partnering Olivia Nicholls, Gadecki won her first WTA Tour doubles title at the ATX Open, defeating Katarzyna Kawa and Bibiane Schoofs in the final.

Ranked No. 177, she qualified for the Wimbledon Championships making her debut at this major but suffering a straight sets loss to Robin Montgomery.

Ranked No. 152, she qualified for the Guadalajara Open and defeated Sloane Stephens in the first round. She then upset second seed Danielle Collins, in straight sets in the second round, to reach her first WTA Tour quarterfinal and first at the 500-level. Next, she defeated Martina Trevisan, her third top 100 win, to reach her first WTA Tour semifinal (the third active Australian woman player to reach a semifinal at the WTA 500 level after Ajla Tomljanović and Daria Saville), and finally Camila Osorio to reach her maiden career final. As a result, she reached a new career-high in the top 90, raising close to 65 positions, becoming the Australian No. 1 ahead of Daria Saville in the women's singles rankings on 16 September 2024. She became the first Australian to reach a WTA 500 singles final since Ash Barty in January 2022 in Adelaide. Gadecki lost in the final to Magdalena Fręch.

=== 2025: Australian mixed title and Wimbledon doubles semifinal ===
Partnering John Peers, Gadecki won the mixed doubles title at the Australian Open, defeating Kimberly Birrell and John-Patrick Smith in the final.

== Performance timelines ==
Key
W	F	SF	QF	#R	RR	Q#	DNQ	A	NH

(W) winner; (F) finalist; (SF) semifinalist; (QF) quarterfinalist; (#R) rounds 4, 3, 2, 1; (RR) round-robin stage; (Q#) qualification round; (DNQ) did not qualify; (A) absent; (NH) not held; (SR) strike rate (events won / competed); (W–L) win–loss record.
To avoid confusion and double counting, these charts are updated at the conclusion of a tournament or when the player's participation has ended.

Only main-draw results in WTA Tour, Grand Slam tournaments, Fed Cup/Billie Jean King Cup, Hopman Cup, United Cup and Olympic Games are included in win–loss records.

=== Singles ===
Current through the 2026 WTA Tour.

Tournament	2021	2022	2023	2024	2025	2026	SR	W–L
Grand Slam tournaments
Australian Open	Q2	A	2R	1R	1R	Q2	0 / 3	1–3
French Open	Q1	Q1	Q2	Q3	1R	A	0 / 1	0–1
Wimbledon	A	Q1	Q3	1R	1R	A	0 / 2	0–2
US Open	A	A	1R	Q2	Q2	A	0 / 1	0–1
Win–Loss	0–0	0–0	1–2	0–2	0–3	0–0	0 / 7	1–7
National representation
Billie Jean King Cup	SF	A	A	A			0 / 1	0–0
WTA 1000
Qatar Open	NMS	A	NMS	A	A	A	0 / 0	0–0
Dubai Championships	A	NMS	A	A	A	A	0 / 0	0–0
Indian Wells Open	A	A	A	A	Q1	A	0 / 0	0–0
Miami Open	A	A	A	A	Q1	A	0 / 0	0–0
Madrid Open	A	A	A	A	Q1	A	0 / 0	0–0
Italian Open	A	A	Q1	A	1R	A	0 / 1	0–1
Canadian Open	A	A	A	A	A	A	0 / 0	0–0
Cincinnati Open	A	A	A	A	Q1	A	0 / 0	0–0
Career statistics
Tournaments	3	1	5	7	7	0	Career total: 23	
Titles	0	0	0	0	0	0	Career total: 0	
Finals	0	0	0	0	0	0	Career total: 0	
Overall win–loss	2–3	0–1	1–5	5–7	1–7	0–0	0 / 23	9–23
Year–end ranking	230	201	132	90	214		$1,932,586	

=== Doubles ===
Current through the 2026 Australian Open.

Tournament	2021	2022	2023	2024	2025	2026	SR	W–L	Win %
Grand Slam tournaments
Australian Open	2R	A	2R	2R	3R	1R	0 / 5	5–5	50%
French Open	A	1R	A	A	1R	A	0 / 2	0–2	0%
Wimbledon	A	A	A	2R	SF	A	0 / 2	5–2	71%
US Open	A	A	A	1R	1R	A	0 / 2	0–2	0%
Win–loss	1–1	0–1	1–1	2–3	6–4	0–1	0 / 11	10–11	48%
Career statistics
Tournaments	3	1	2	4	2	0	Career total: 15		
Titles	0	0	0	0	0	0	Career total: 0		
Finals	0	0	0	0	0	0	Career total: 0		
Overall win–loss	1–3	0–1	2–2	3–4	8–6		0 / 16	14–16	47%
Year-end ranking	178	730	96	102	56				

=== Mixed doubles ===
Tournament	2023	2024	2025	2026	SR	W–L	Win %
Australian Open	SF	SF	W	W	2 / 4	16–2	89%
French Open	A	A	A	A	0 / 0	0–0	–
Wimbledon	A	A	A	A	0 / 0	0–0	–
US Open	A	A	A	A	0 / 0	0–0	–
Win–Loss	3–1	3–1	5–0	5–0	2 / 4	16–2	89%

== Grand Slam tournaments finals ==
=== Mixed doubles: 2 (2 titles) ===
Result	Year	Tournament	Surface	Partner	Opponents	Score
Win	2025	Australian Open	Hard	(Australia) John Peers	(Australia) Kimberly Birrell (Australia) John-Patrick Smith	3–6, 6–4, [10–6]
Win	2026	Australian Open (2)	Hard	(Australia) John Peers	(France) Kristina Mladenovic (France) Manuel Guinard	4–6, 6–3, [10–8]

== WTA Tour finals ==
=== Singles: 1 (runner-up) ===
Legend WTA 500 (0–1)	Finals by surface Hard (0–1)

Result	Date	Tournament	Tier	Surface	Opponent	Score
Loss	Sep 2024	Guadalajara Open, Mexico	WTA 500	Hard	(Poland) Magdalena Fręch	6–7^{(5–7)}, 4–6

=== Doubles: 1 (title) ===
Legend WTA 250 (1–0)	Finals by surface Hard (1–0)

Result	Date	Tournament	Tier	Surface	Partner	Opponents	Score
Win	Mar 2024	ATX Open, United States	WTA 250	Hard	(United Kingdom) Olivia Nicholls	(Poland) Katarzyna Kawa (Netherlands) Bibiane Schoofs	6–2, 6–4

== WTA 125 finals ==
=== Doubles: 2 (2 titles) ===
Result	W–L	Date	Tournament	Surface	Partner	Opponents	Score
Win	1–0	Aug 2023	Golden Gate Open, United States	Hard	(United Kingdom) Jodie Burrage	(United States) Hailey Baptiste (United States) Claire Liu	7–6^{(4)}, 6–7^{(6)}, [10–8]
Win	2–0	Mar 2024	Charleston Pro, United States	Hard	(United Kingdom) Olivia Nicholls	(Italy) Sara Errani (Slovakia) Tereza Mihalíková	6–2, 6–1

== ITF Circuit finals ==
=== Singles: 14 (3 titles, 11 runner-ups) ===
Legend W100 tournaments (0–1) W60 tournaments (0–5) W40 tournaments (1–0) W25 tournaments (1–4) W15 tournaments (1–1)	Finals by surface Hard (2–8) Clay (1–3)

Result	W–L	Date	Tournament	Tier	Surface	Opponent	Score
Loss	0–1	Apr 2021	ITF Sharm El Sheikh, Egypt	W15	Hard	(Chinese Taipei) Lee Ya-hsuan	3–6, 3–6
Win	1–1	May 2021	ITF Antalya, Turkiye	W15	Clay	(Russia) Julia Avdeeva	6–3, 6–2
Loss	1–2	Jun 2021	ITF Madrid, Spain	W25	Hard	(United States) Robin Anderson	3–6, 7–6^{(3)}, 6–7^{(8)}
Win	2–2	Aug 2021	ITF Vigo, Spain	W25	Hard	(Japan) Yuriko Miyazaki	6–2, 6–4
Loss	2–3	Feb 2022	Bendigo Pro Tour, Australia	W25	Hard	(United States) Asia Muhammad	2–6, 4–6
Loss	2–4	Mar 2022	Bendigo Pro Tour 2, Australia	W25	Hard	(Australia) Jaimee Fourlis	3–6, ret.
Loss	2–5	Mar 2022	Clay Court International, Australia	W60	Clay	(Japan) Moyuka Uchijima	2–6, 2–6
Loss	2–6	Feb 2023	Burnie International, Australia	W60	Hard	(Australia) Storm Hunter	4–6, 3–6
Loss	2–7	Feb 2023	Burnie International 2, Australia	W25	Hard	(Australia) Jaimee Fourlis	4–6, 3–6
Loss	2–8	Mar 2023	Clay Court International, Australia	W60	Clay	(Australia) Priscilla Hon	6–4, 2–6, 4–6
Loss	2–9	Mar 2023	Clay Court International 2, Australia	W60	Clay	(China) Wang Yafan	6–3, 2–6, 0–6
Win	3–9	Jun 2023	ITF Montemor-o-Novo, Portugal	W40	Hard	(Australia) Arina Rodionova	6–3, 6–2
Loss	3–10	Dec 2023	Gold Coast International, Australia	W60	Hard	(Australia) Talia Gibson	5–7, 2–6
Loss	3–11	Aug 2024	Landisville Tennis Challenge, US	W100	Hard	(United States) McCartney Kessler	6–4, 2–6, 4–6

=== Doubles: 23 (13 titles, 10 runner-ups) ===
Legend W100 tournaments (3–2) W60/75 tournaments (3–4) W40/50 tournaments (1–0) W25/35 tournaments (4–3) W15 tournaments (2–1)	Finals by surface Hard (9–8) Clay (3–1) Grass (1–1)

Result	W–L	Date	Tournament	Tier	Surface	Partner	Opponents	Score
Win	1–0	Mar 2021	ITF Sharm El Sheikh, Egypt	W15	Hard	(Romania) Elena-Teodora Cadar	(Canada) Raphaëlle Lacasse (Czech Republic) Anna Sisková	6–3, 6–4
Loss	1–1	Apr 2021	ITF Sharm El Sheikh, Egypt	W15	Hard	(Romania) Elena-Teodora Cadar	(United Kingdom) Alicia Barnett (Israel) Lina Glushko	4–6, 2–6
Win	2–1	Apr 2021	ITF Antalya, Turkiye	W15	Clay	(Burundi) Sada Nahimana	(South Korea) Lee So-ra (Japan) Misaki Matsuda	6–3, 1–6, [11–9]
Win	3–1	Jun 2021	ITF Madrid, Spain	W25	Hard	(Australia) Destanee Aiava	(Japan) Mana Ayukawa (South Korea) Han Na-lae	6–3, 6–3
Win	4–1	Jul 2021	Open Araba en Femenino, Spain	W60	Hard	(Spain) Rebeka Masarova	(Spain) Celia Cerviño Ruiz (United Kingdom) Olivia Nicholls	6–3, 6–3
Win	5–1	Aug 2021	ITF Vigo, Spain	W25	Hard	(United Kingdom) Alicia Barnett	(Switzerland) Conny Perrin (Brazil) Laura Pigossi	6–3, 6–2
Loss	5–2	Oct 2021	ITF Hamburg, Germany	W25	Hard (i)	(Burundi) Sada Nahimana	(Latvia) Kamilla Bartone (Switzerland) Ylena In-Albon	4–6, 3–6
Loss	5–3	Feb 2023	Burnie International, Australia	W25	Hard	(Australia) Lily Fairclough	(Australia) Destanee Aiava (United Kingdom) Naiktha Bains	3–6, 5–7
Win	6–3	Feb 2023	ITF Swan Hill, Australia	W25	Grass	(Australia) Lily Fairclough	(Chinese Taipei) Liang En-shuo (China) Wang Yafan	6–3, 6–3
Loss	6–4	Mar 2023	ITF Swan Hill, Australia	W25	Grass	(Australia) Petra Hule	(Australia) Elysia Bolton (Australia) Alexandra Bozovic	6–7^{(3)}, 6–2, [7–10]
Loss	6–5	Mar 2023	Clay Court International, Australia	W60	Clay	(Australia) Destanee Aiava	(Japan) Erina Hayashi (Japan) Yuki Naito	6–7^{(2)}, 5–7
Win	7–5	May 2023	Wiesbaden Open, Germany	W100	Clay	(Australia) Jaimee Fourlis	(United Kingdom) Emily Appleton (Germany) Julia Lohoff	6–1, 6–4
Loss	7–6	Jul 2023	Lexington Challenger, United States	W60	Hard	(United States) Dalayna Hewitt	(United States) Alexis Blokhina (United States) Ava Markham	4–6, 6–7^{(1)}
Loss	7–7	Aug 2023	Landisville Tennis Challenge, United States	W100	Hard	(Japan) Mai Hontama	(United States) Sophie Chang (Ukraine) Yulia Starodubtseva	w/o
Win	8–7	Oct 2023	ITF Baza, Spain	W25	Hard	(United Kingdom) Samantha Murray Sharan	(Croatia) Lea Bošković (Spain) Ángela Fita Boluda	7–5, 4–6, [10–4]
Win	9–7	Oct 2023	ITF Quinta do Lago, Portugal	W40	Hard	(United Kingdom) Heather Watson	(Portugal) Francisca Jorge (Portugal) Matilde Jorge	6–4, 6–1
Win	10–7	Oct 2023	GB Pro-Series Shrewsbury, United Kingdom	W100	Hard (i)	(United Kingdom) Harriet Dart	(Estonia) Elena Malõgina (Czech Republic) Barbora Palicová	6–0, 6–2
Loss	10–8	Oct 2023	GB Pro-Series Glasgow, United Kingdom	W60	Hard (i)	(United Kingdom) Freya Christie	(Portugal) Francisca Jorge (United Kingdom) Maia Lumsden	3–6, 1–6
Win	11–8	Apr 2025	Zaragoza Open, Spain	W100	Clay	(Indonesia) Aldila Sutjiadi	(Spain) Aliona Bolsova (Spain) Ángela Fita Boluda	6–4, 6–3
Loss	11–9	Oct 2025	Edmond Open, United States	W100	Hard	(Poland) Olivia Lincer	(Ukraine) Valeriya Strakhova (Russia) Anastasia Tikhonova	3–6, 7–6^{(2)}, [8-10]
Loss	11–10	Nov 2025	ITF Fujairah Championships, United Arab Emirates	W75	Hard	(United Kingdom) Mika Stojsavljevic	(Slovakia) Viktória Hrunčáková (Czech Republic) Vendula Valdmannová	4–6, 3–6
Win	12–10	Feb 2026	Trnava Indoor, Slovakia	W75	Hard (i)	(Russia) Anastasia Tikhonova	(Czech Republic) Aneta Kučmová (Czech Republic) Aneta Laboutková	6–3, 6–3
Win	13–10	Nov 2026	River City Challenger, Australia	W75	Hard	(Chinese Taipei) Wan I-wen	(Australia) Amy Stevens (Australia) Belle Thompson	6–2, 6–0

== Wins over top 10 players ==
- Gadecki's match record against players who were, at the time the match was played, ranked in the top 10.

Season	2021	Total
Wins	1	1

#	Player	Rk	Event	Surface	Rd	Score	Rk	Ref
2021
1.	(United States) Sofia Kenin	4	Phillip Island Trophy, Australia	Hard	2R	2–6, 7–6^{(4)}, 6–4	N/A	
