= Golden Gate Open =

Defunct tennis tournament
- Location: Stanford, California, United States
- Venue: Taube Tennis Center
- Category: WTA 125
- Surface: Hard
- Draw: 32S / 16D
- Prize money: US$ 160,000 (2023)

Current champions (2023)
- Men's singles: (France) Constant Lestienne
- Women's singles: (China) Wang Yafan
- Men's doubles: (Ecuador) Diego Hidalgo (Colombia) Cristian Rodríguez
- Women's doubles: (United Kingdom) Jodie Burrage (Australia) Olivia Gadecki
ATP Tour
- Category: ATP Challenger 125

The Golden Gate Open was a professional tennis tournament. The event, played on outdoor hardcourts, held its inaugural edition in August 2023 at the Taube Tennis Center on the campus of Stanford University in California. The tournament was on both the ATP and the WTA Challenger Tour calendars.

The 2024 event was cancelled because of Stanford's plan to rebuild the tennis center.

== Past finals ==
=== Men's singles ===
Year	Champion	Runner-up	Score
2023	(France) Constant Lestienne	(United States) Emilio Nava	7–6^{(7–4)}, 6–2

=== Men's doubles ===
Year	Champions	Runners-up	Score
2023	(Ecuador) Diego Hidalgo (Colombia) Cristian Rodríguez	(United Kingdom) Julian Cash (United Kingdom) Henry Patten	6–7^{(1–7)}, 6–4, [10–8]

=== Women's singles ===
Year	Champion	Runner-up	Score
2023	(China) Wang Yafan	Kamilla Rakhimova	6–2, 6–0

=== Women's doubles ===
Year	Champions	Runners-up	Score
2023	(United Kingdom) Jodie Burrage (Australia) Olivia Gadecki	(United States) Hailey Baptiste (United States) Claire Liu	7–6^{(7–4)}, 6–7^{(6–8)}, [10–8]

== See also ==
- Silicon Valley Classic
- Southern California Open Challenger
