= 2026 Transylvania Open – Singles =

Singles
- 2026 Transylvania Open

Final
- Champion: (Romania) Sorana Cîrstea
- Runner-up: (United Kingdom) Emma Raducanu
- Score: 6–0, 6–2

Details
- Draw: 32 (4Q / 4WC)
- Seeds: 8

Events
Singles	Doubles
- Transylvania Open

Sorana Cîrstea defeated Emma Raducanu in the final, 6–0, 6–2 to win the singles tennis title at the 2026 Transylvania Open. She did not lose a set en route to her fourth WTA Tour title, and was the first Romanian to win the title. Raducanu was contesting her first WTA Tour-level final since the 2021 US Open.

Anastasia Potapova was the defending champion, but lost in the quarterfinals to Cîrstea.

== Seeds ==
1. (United Kingdom) Emma Raducanu (final)
2. (Romania) Jaqueline Cristian (second round)
3. (Romania) Sorana Cîrstea (champion)
4. (China) Wang Xinyu (quarterfinals)
5. (Austria) Anastasia Potapova (quarterfinals)
6. (Croatia) Antonia Ružić (first round)
7. (Serbia) Olga Danilović (second round)
8. (Hungary) Anna Bondár (second round)

== Draw ==
Key

- Q = Qualifier
- WC = Wild card
- LL = Lucky loser
- Alt = Alternate
- ITF = ITF entry
- PR = Protected ranking
- SR = Special ranking
- SE = Special exempt
- JE = Junior exempt
- JR = Junior Accelerator Programme entrant
- CO = College Accelerator Programme entrant
- NG = Next Gen Accelerator Program entrant
- w/o = Walkover
- r = Retired
- d = Defaulted

=== Finals ===
Semifinals
1	(United Kingdom) Emma Raducanu	7	3	6
(Ukraine) Oleksandra Oliynykova	5	6	3
3	(Romania) Sorana Cîrstea	6	6
Q	(Ukraine) Daria Snigur	0	3

Final
1	(United Kingdom) Emma Raducanu	0	2
3	(Romania) Sorana Cîrstea	6	6

=== Top half ===
First round
1	(United Kingdom) E Raducanu	6	6
(Belgium) G Minnen	0	4
WC	(Romania) ER Bertea	3	4
(Slovenia) K Juvan	6	6
Q	(Poland) M Chwalińska	6	6
WC	(Romania) A Bogdan	3	2
WC	(Romania) M Bulgaru	4	3
7	(Serbia) O Danilović	6	6
4	(China) Xin Wang	6	6
Q	(Spain) K Quevedo	3	0
(Romania) E-G Ruse	1	6	2
(Switzerland) R Masarova	6	4	6
(Egypt) M Sherif	7^{8}	4	4
(Ukraine) O Oliynykova	6^{6}	6	6
(Germany) E Seidel	6	6^{6}	0
8	(Hungary) A Bondár	4	7^{8}	6

Second round
1	(United Kingdom) E Raducanu	7	6
(Slovenia) K Juvan	5	1
Q	(Poland) M Chwalińska	6	1	6
7	(Serbia) O Danilović	1	6	2
4	(China) Xin Wang	6	6
(Switzerland) R Masarova	4	2
(Ukraine) O Oliynykova	6	6
8	(Hungary) A Bondár	4	4

Quarterfinals
1	(United Kingdom) E Raducanu	6	6
Q	(Poland) M Chwalińska	0	4
4	(China) Xin Wang	4	4
(Ukraine) O Oliynykova	6	6

Semifinals
1	(United Kingdom) E Raducanu	7	3	6
(Ukraine) O Oliynykova	5	6	3

=== Bottom half ===
First round
5	(Austria) A Potapova	5	6	7
(Italy) L Bronzetti	7	4	5
WC	(Czech Republic) Ka Plíšková	6	2	2
A Zakharova	4	6	6
(Slovenia) V Erjavec	1	4
LL	(Slovenia) T Zidanšek	6	6
(Uzbekistan) K Rakhimova	4	4
3	(Romania) S Cîrstea	6	6
6	(Croatia) A Ružić	4	7	2
(China) Y Yuan	6	5	6
PR	(Spain) S Sorribes Tormo	6	7
(Bulgaria) V Tomova	2	5
(France) T Rakotomanga Rajaonah	3	3
Q	(Ukraine) D Snigur	6	6
Q	(Italy) L Stefanini	2	6	5
2	(Romania) J Cristian	6	2	7

Second round
5	(Austria) A Potapova	1	6	6
A Zakharova	6	4	3
LL	(Slovenia) T Zidanšek	1	0
3	(Romania) S Cîrstea	6	6
(China) Y Yuan	4	6	7^{7}
PR	(Spain) S Sorribes Tormo	6	2	6^{5}
Q	(Ukraine) D Snigur	6	6
2	(Romania) J Cristian	1	0

Quarterfinals
5	(Austria) A Potapova	5	4
3	(Romania) S Cîrstea	7	6
(China) Y Yuan	6	0	5
Q	(Ukraine) D Snigur	4	6	7

Semifinals
3	(Romania) S Cîrstea	6	6
Q	(Ukraine) D Snigur	0	3

== Qualifying ==
=== Seeds ===
1. (Spain) Kaitlin Quevedo (qualified)
2. (Ukraine) Daria Snigur (qualified)
3. (Italy) Lucrezia Stefanini (qualified)
4. (Spain) Leyre Romero Gormaz (qualifying competition)
5. (Poland) Maja Chwalińska (qualified)
6. (United States) Varvara Lepchenko (first round)
7. (Slovenia) Tamara Zidanšek (qualifying competition, lucky loser)
8. Iryna Shymanovich (qualifying competition)

=== Qualifiers ===
1. (Spain) Kaitlin Quevedo
2. (Ukraine) Daria Snigur
3. (Italy) Lucrezia Stefanini
4. (Poland) Maja Chwalińska

=== Lucky loser ===
1. (Slovenia) Tamara Zidanšek

=== Qualifying draw ===
==== First qualifier ====
First round
1	(Spain) Kaitlin Quevedo	7^{7}	6
Alina Charaeva	6^{3}	2
(Spain) Irene Burillo	5	2
8	Iryna Shymanovich	7	6

Qualifying competition
1	(Spain) Kaitlin Quevedo	2	6	6
8	Iryna Shymanovich	6	1	3

==== Second qualifier ====
First round
2	(Ukraine) Daria Snigur	6	6
(Ukraine) Anhelina Kalinina	3	1
(Spain) Aliona Bolsova	7	6
6	(United States) Varvara Lepchenko	5	4

Qualifying competition
2	(Ukraine) Daria Snigur	6	6
(Spain) Aliona Bolsova	3	3

==== Third qualifier ====
First round
3	(Italy) Lucrezia Stefanini	6	6
WC	(Romania) Briana Szabó	1	1
(Georgia (country)) Ekaterine Gorgodze	7^{9}	2	1
7	(Slovenia) Tamara Zidanšek	6^{7}	6	6

Qualifying competition
3	(Italy) Lucrezia Stefanini	6	5	6
7	(Slovenia) Tamara Zidanšek	1	7	0

==== Fourth qualifier ====
First round
4	(Spain) Leyre Romero Gormaz	6	2	6
(Cyprus) Raluca Șerban	2	6	3
WC	(Romania) Mara Gae	2	3
5	(Poland) Maja Chwalińska	6	6

Qualifying competition
4	(Spain) Leyre Romero Gormaz	6^{2}	4
5	(Poland) Maja Chwalińska	7^{7}	6
