= Emma Raducanu =

British tennis player (born 2002)

Emma Raducanu MBE
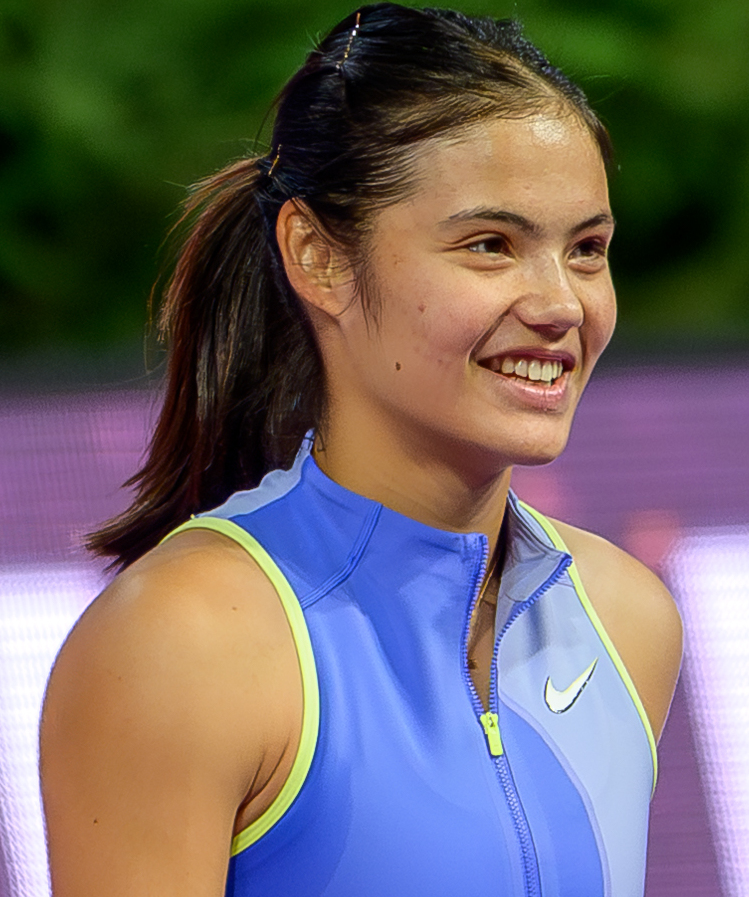
- Raducanu at the 2026 Transylvania Open
- Country (sports): Great Britain
- Residence: Bromley, London, UK
- Born: 13 November 2002 (age 24) Toronto, Ontario, Canada
- Height: 5 ft 7 in (1.70 m) (Note: Most sources list her height as 1.75 m, but the conversions to imperial differ. Some sources, including the WTA, cite her height as 5 ft 7 in / 1.70 m, others as 5 ft 9 in / 1.75 m.)
- Turned pro: 2018
- Plays: Right-handed (two-handed backhand)
- Coach: Andrew Richardson
- Prize money: $6,562,478

Singles
- Career record: 158–94
- Career titles: 1
- Highest ranking: No. 10 (11 July 2022)
- Current ranking: No. 107 (12 October 2026)

Grand Slam singles results
- Australian Open: 3R (2025)
- French Open: 2R (2022, 2025)
- Wimbledon: 4R (2021, 2024)
- US Open: W (2021)

Doubles
- Career record: 3–5
- Career titles: 0
- Highest ranking: No. 259 (8 June 2026)
- Current ranking: No. 1,581 (27 July 2026)

Grand Slam mixed doubles results
- US Open: 1R (2025)

Team competitions
- BJK Cup: SF (2024), record: 6–1

- Last updated on: 2 August 2026.

Emma Raducanu (Note: /ˌrædəˈkɑːnuː/ RAD-ə-KAH-noo) (born 13 November 2002) is a British professional tennis player. She has reached a career-high singles ranking of world No. 10, achieved in July 2022. She is the current British No. 5 in women's singles, having formerly been No. 1.

Raducanu was the 2021 US Open champion, becoming the first British woman to win a singles major since Virginia Wade at the 1977 Wimbledon Championships. With that victory, she became the first qualifier in the Open Era to win a singles major title, achieved without dropping a set during the tournament. It was the second major of her career, and she holds the Open-Era record for the fewest majors played before winning a title.

== Early life and education ==
Emma Raducanu was born on 13 November 2002, in Toronto, Canada, and was raised in Bromley, England. Her father, Ion Răducanu, is from Bucharest, Romania, and her mother, Renee Zhai (Dongmei), is from Shenyang, China. Both of her parents work in the finance sector.

Her family moved to England when she was two years old, and she holds both British and Canadian citizenship. She is fluent in English, Mandarin and Romanian.

Raducanu started playing tennis at the age of five, while also participating in various other sports and activities as a child, such as basketball, golf, karting, motocross, skiing, horse riding, and ballet.

She attended Bickley Primary School, followed by Newstead Wood School, a selective state grammar school in Orpington, where she obtained an A* in mathematics and an A in economics in her A-Levels.

== Career ==
=== Juniors ===
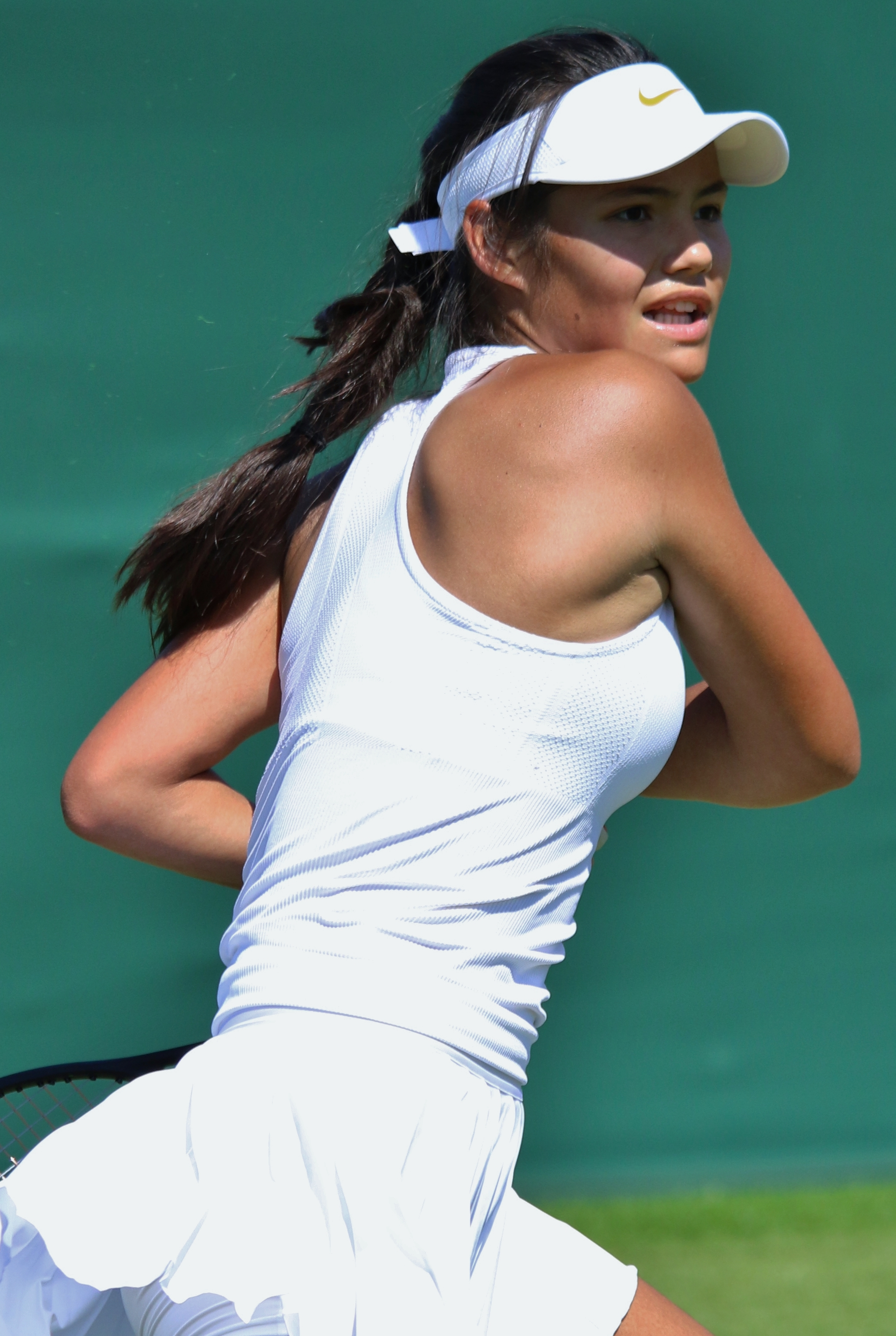
Raducanu during qualifiers at the 2018 Wimbledon Championships

Raducanu made her ITF Junior Circuit debut in Liverpool at the Nike Junior International (Grade-5 event), after having entered on her 13th birthday, the earliest allowed age of entry. She subsequently won the tournament eight days later and became the youngest-ever winner of an ITF under-18 tournament. Her junior success continued in 2017 with two titles in February at the Yonex ITF Hamburg and ITF Oslo Open Grade-4 events.

Raducanu won the Chandigarh Lawn Tennis girls' ITF tournament in January 2018. In 2018, she won Grade-3 at Chandigarh and Grade-2 junior tournaments at New Delhi, both in India. Raducanu defeated Diana Khodan of Ukraine in the final at Chandigarh, held at the Lawn Tennis Association Stadium, where she won in straight sets. She won two additional titles the following month, four in total for 2018 and seven over the course of her junior career, with wins at the Biotehnos Cup and Šiauliai Open Grade-2 events.

Later that year, she reached the girls' singles quarterfinals at both the Wimbledon Championships and the US Open. At Wimbledon, Raducanu defeated Leylah Fernandez in the second round, a victory she would repeat in the (senior) US Open final three years later.

=== 2018–2020: Professional debut and BJK Cup ===
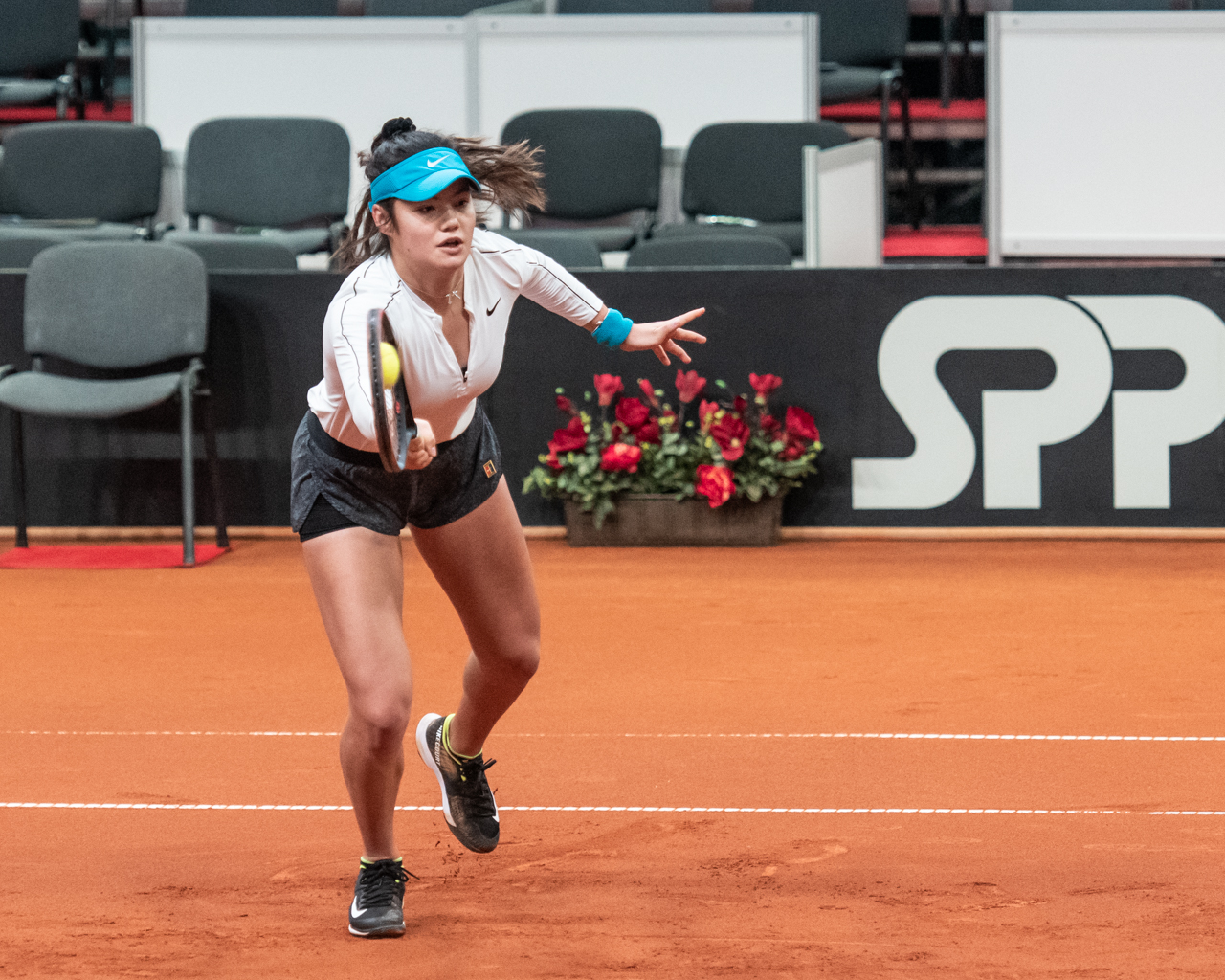
Raducanu during the Billie Jean King Cup qualifiers in February 2020

Raducanu turned professional in 2018. She alternated between junior and professional tournaments during 2018 and 2019.

She made her debut on the ITF Women's Circuit in 2018 and secured her first title of the year in May at the 15k event in Tiberias. She finished the season with a second 15k title in October at Antalya.

In 2019, Raducanu competed in Maharashtra, India. She retired in the second round of the 25k Solapur Open. She won a 25k event in Pune in December; in the final at Deccan Gymkhana Ground, she won against Naiktha Bains in three sets. Her semifinal and quarterfinal victories came in three sets. In Fed Cup (eventually Billie Jean King Cup), she was a hitting partner for the British team in 2019. She was then selected to play for the team in the 2020 qualifying, after Johanna Konta withdrew to focus on the Olympics. At the time, Raducanu was described as "the British player with the most potential of her generation". She would have partnered Bains in the doubles qualifiers against Slovakia, but the match was not played. Asked about being called up to the British team as a teenager, Raducanu said, "Being a bit of the underdog is great because you can go out there with no fear."

In 2020, many tennis events were cancelled due to the COVID-19 pandemic. Raducanu participated in exhibition matches and small tournaments in the United Kingdom. She won the Lawn Tennis Association LTA British Tour Masters title in December 2020. She also devoted time to her academic studies, preparing for her A-Level examinations, which she took in 2021.

=== 2021: US Open title and top 20 ===
Raducanu began training with coach Nigel Sears at the end of April 2021. At the beginning of June, Raducanu made her WTA Tour main-draw debut at the Nottingham Open as a wildcard entry. She lost in the first round to Briton Harriet Dart.

In late June, Raducanu made her major main-draw debut on a wildcard to the Wimbledon Championships. She advanced to the third round with initial victories over Vitalia Diatchenko and Markéta Vondroušová. She was the youngest British woman to reach the Wimbledon third round since Elena Baltacha in 2002. She then defeated Sorana Cîrstea to reach the fourth round, becoming the youngest British woman to reach the last 16 in the Open era, as well as entering into the top 200. Raducanu retired in the second set of her fourth-round match against Ajla Tomljanović, after experiencing breathing difficulties and sickness.

In July, Raducanu changed her coach from Sears to Andrew Richardson, one of her youth coaches. Richardson was chosen to coach Raducanu through the US Open Series. Raducanu then played at the Silicon Valley Classic, the first women's tournament in the annual US Open Series, in August after again receiving a wildcard to enter the tournament; she lost in the first round to Zhang Shuai. She reached the final of the WTA 125 event in Chicago, where she lost to Clara Tauson. The WTA ranking points she gained brought her to a new career-high ranking of world No. 150.

At the US Open, Raducanu entered the main draw as a qualifier. Ranked 150th in the world, she had to play three matches in the qualifying tournament to get into the main draw. In the main draw, she defeated Stefanie Vögele, Zhang Shuai, Sara Sorribes Tormo, Shelby Rogers, Belinda Bencic, Maria Sakkari, and Leylah Fernandez to win the US Open. On her way to the title she advanced to the semifinals without dropping a set, and became the fifth player in the Open era to reach a major semifinal as a qualifier. In progressing to the final of the US Open, Raducanu entered the top 25 and became the British No. 1. She became the fifth player in the Open Era to make the semifinal on her US Open debut, and the first British woman to reach the US Open final since Virginia Wade in 1968. Raducanu defeated Leylah Fernandez in two sets, winning with a 109-mph ace, in what was the first all-teenage women's singles final since the 1999 US Open. She won the title without dropping a set, the first woman to do so at the US Open since Williams in 2014. Raducanu was the first qualifier (male or female) to win a Grand Slam tournament in the Open Era. As a result of her US Open victory, Raducanu rose to No. 23 in the rankings, a jump of 332 places from the start of the year. Raducanu received congratulatory messages from a number of notable figures, including Elizabeth II and Catherine, Duchess of Cambridge.

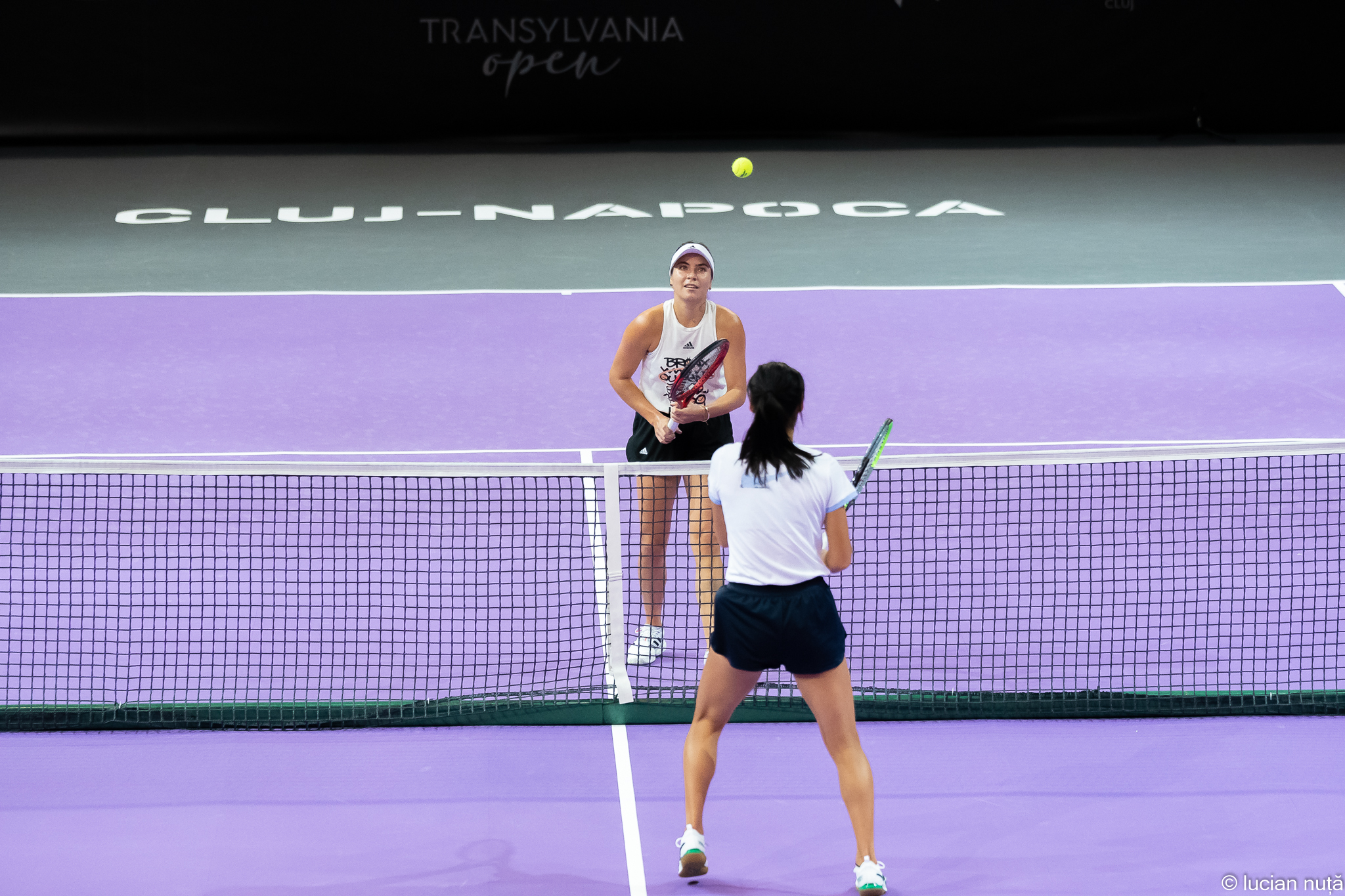
Raducanu (foreground) and Elena-Gabriela Ruse practising together at the Transylvania Open in 2021

Less than two weeks after her victory at the US Open, Raducanu chose not to extend her coaching arrangement with Richardson. She entered the Indian Wells Open in October 2021, accepting a wildcard place in the main draw. Although she was without a coach, former British No. 1, Jeremy Bates, aided her at the event. Raducanu lost in straight sets in her first match against Aliaksandra Sasnovich. After that, she withdrew from the Kremlin Cup, citing schedule changes.

Later in October, Raducanu entered the Transylvania Open, in Cluj-Napoca, Romania, as the third seed. There, she earned her first WTA Tour victory by defeating Polona Hercog. She advanced to the quarterfinals by defeating Ana Bogdan, before losing to Marta Kostyuk in straight sets. Her last WTA Tour event of 2021 was the Linz Open, which she entered as the top seed for the first time. She lost in her round of 16 match against Wang Xinyu, in three sets. Shortly after the tournament, she announced she had hired a permanent coach, naming Torben Beltz to the position.

After finishing the 2021 WTA Tour at a career-high of world No. 19, Raducanu participated in an exhibition match against Elena-Gabriela Ruse at the Champions Tennis event in the Royal Albert Hall on 28 November 2021, and won in two sets. She was scheduled to play Bencic in another exhibition at the Mubadala Championship, before withdrawing after testing positive for COVID-19.

=== 2022: Top 10, injuries ===
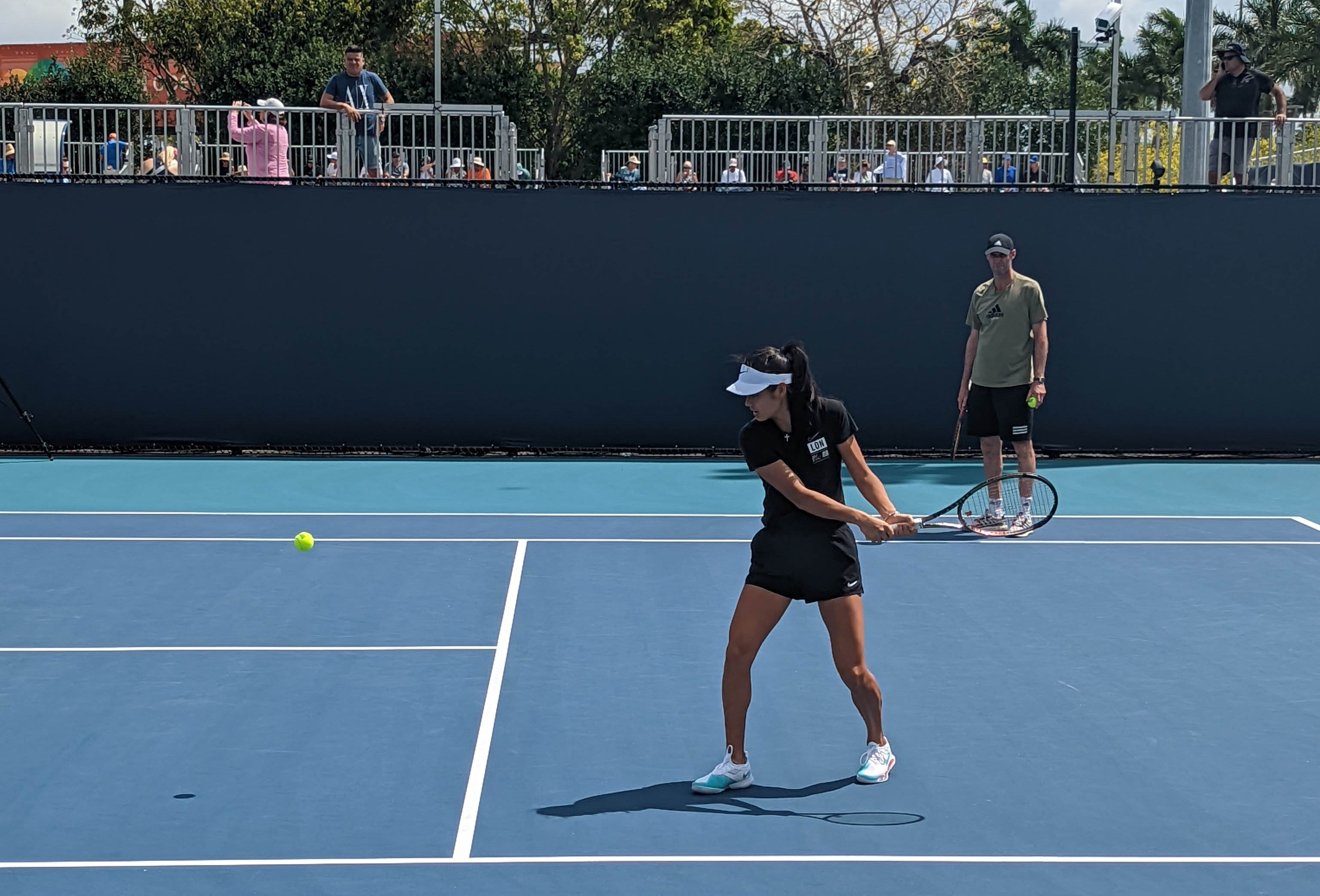
Raducanu with coach Torben Beltz at the 2022 Miami Open

Raducanu was set to start the season at the Melbourne Summer Set, but withdrew, citing her recent bout of COVID-19. She began the season at the Sydney International with a lopsided loss to Elena Rybakina in the first round. She reached her career-high singles ranking of No. 18 on 10 January 2022, and made her Australian Open debut as the 17th seed, where she defeated 2017 US Open champion and former world No. 3, Sloane Stephens, in the first round. She was defeated by Danka Kovinić in the second round, putting the loss down to a blister on her racquet hand. On 14 February 2022, she climbed to a new career-high singles ranking of 12. At the Abierto Zapopan, she retired in her first-round match against Daria Saville in the third set, due to an injury acquired during the over three-and-a-half-hour match, the then-longest of the WTA Tour season, after having served for the match a set earlier. She subsequently withdrew from the Monterrey Open due to the reported "small left leg injury".

This season marked her first appearance in the "Sunshine Double" (Miami and Indian Wells Opens), after having only played at Indian Wells before. Her only success came at Indian Wells with a victory over former world No. 4, Caroline Garcia, in her first match, before losing in the subsequent round. The early hardcourt season concluded with a first-match loss in her Miami Open debut.

In March, she was announced on the British team for the BJK Cup qualifiers; the matches marked her first time playing in the competition, as well as her first match of the season on clay. She debuted as Great Britain's top seed in a tie against the Czech Republic. She secured her first professional victory on clay in her first match of the tournament against Tereza Martincová, in straight sets. She was defeated by Markéta Vondroušová in her second match of the qualifying tournament after suffering blister issues on her right foot. Following this, her season continued with a clay-court season debut at the Stuttgart Open in April, where she secured her first WTA Tour victory on clay against Storm Sanders in the first round. She advanced to her first quarterfinals in a WTA 500 level event and was defeated by world No. 1, Iga Świątek. This was her first match against a No. 1 ranked player.

After only five months of working together, Raducanu announced a split from her coach Torben Beltz to use a new training model with the Lawn Tennis Association (LTA) supporting in the interim. This change included the addition of LTA coach Louis Cayer as a consultant on her technique, particularly serves, having worked together since early April. In May, Raymond Sarmiento began working as her hitting partner. She was aided by Iain Bates of the LTA in place of a coach in her debut at the Madrid Open. After the Stuttgart quarterfinals appearance, the remainder of her clay court season saw little success, with early round exits at the Madrid Open, Italian Open, and in her debut at the French Open, where she lost to Aliaksandra Sasnovich. This included a first round retirement at the Italian Open against former world No. 4 and 2019 US Open champion, Bianca Andreescu, after carrying a back injury into the match.

She began her grass-court season at the Nottingham Open where she faced Viktorija Golubic in the first round. After only 33 minutes, she retired due to injury. Raducanu had been expected to enter as a top 20 wildcard into Eastbourne, but did not enter due to the ongoing injury. Nevertheless, she entered Wimbledon, where she was seeded 10th. She was defeated by Caroline Garcia in the second round after a first-round win over Alison Van Uytvanck. She reached the top 10 in the rankings on 11 July 2022.

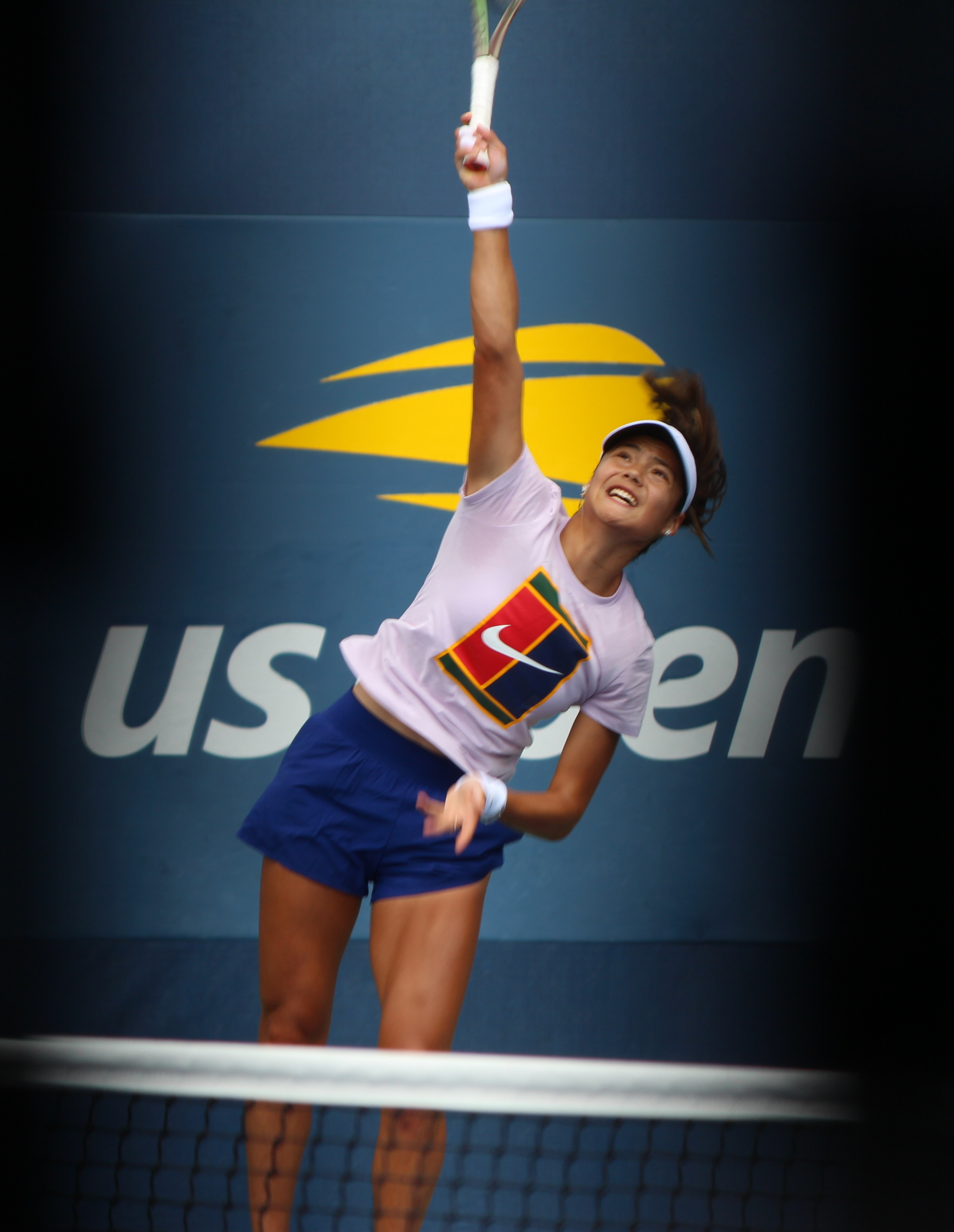
Raducanu at the 2022 US Open

Raducanu started the US Open Series by entering the Washington Open in August. Seeded second, she advanced to her second quarterfinals of the season in which she was defeated playing the longest two-set match of the 2022 season a round earlier. Raducanu also made her professional doubles debut at the tournament with Clara Tauson, losing in the first round. She also started working with coach Dmitry Tursunov on a trial basis. She debuted at the Canadian Open, where she was defeated by 2021 tournament winner Camila Giorgi in the first round. The summer hardcourt season continued with a third-round loss at the Cincinnati Open after lopsided wins against former number-one players Serena Williams and Victoria Azarenka. She became the first player in history to win a bagel set against both Williams and Azarenka.

Raducanu entered the 2022 US Open as the defending champion, seeded 11th. In her first-round match, she lost to Alizé Cornet in straight sets, and became the third woman in US Open history to lose her opening match in the year after winning the title. Having failed to defend any of the points she earned with the title the previous year, Raducanu fell outside of the top 80 in the rankings. The early US Open exit was followed by a second-round loss at the Slovenia Open, where she received a medical timeout to tend to her left leg.

At the Korea Open, Raducanu advanced to her first semifinal of the season where she retired in the third set to top seed Jeļena Ostapenko due to an injury. This was her fourth mid-match retirement of the season. After a first round exit at the Ostrava Open, her WTA season ended after withdrawing from the Transylvania Open and Guadalajara Open, citing a wrist injury. Following this, the coaching trial with Tursunov concluded without an extension and fitness trainer Jez Green was added to the team. The wrist injury also led to a withdrawal from the Billie Jean King Cup Finals a few weeks later. After finishing the season ranked at world No. 75, she was defeated by world No. 2, Ons Jabeur, in an exhibition match at the World Tennis Championship where she also started working with Sebastian Sachs as her new coach on a trial basis.

=== 2023: Injuries and surgery ===
Ranked No. 78, Raducanu returned to the tour at the Auckland Open in January. After defeating Czech teenager Linda Fruhvirtová in the first round, she retired in the second round, after sustaining a left ankle injury. Having recovered with a short turnaround for the Australian Open, she advanced to the second round where she was defeated by world No. 7, Coco Gauff. Following an over month-long recovery and training session after Australia, the planned return to tour at the ATX Open was cut short after withdrawing due to tonsillitis. She subsequently withdrew from an exhibition event at Indian Wells to continue preparations for the main tournament. Despite a return of her wrist problems from the previous season, she entered the Indian Wells Open and advanced to the fourth round, defeating 20th seed Magda Linette and 13th seed Beatriz Haddad Maia along the way. Since the wrist continued to be an issue at the Miami Open, after her defeat in the first round, she decided to find a long-term solution to her pain. She was also unavailable to participate in this season's BJK Cup qualifying round.

The clay-court season began with a return to the Stuttgart Open and a lopsided first-round loss to Jeļena Ostapenko, having reached the quarterfinals a year prior. She withdrew late from the Madrid Open, just hours before her first-round match due to a continuing wrist problem. As a result, she fell out of the top 100 for the first time since September 2021 at the conclusion of the tournament. After undergoing surgery on her ankle and both wrists to remove carpal bosses, she skipped the remainder of the clay and grass court seasons with a possible return to tour after the summer. In June, she parted ways with coach Sebastian Sachs.

In November 2023, Raducanu withdrew from a December exhibition match in Macau, continuing her recovery from hand and foot surgeries. Her withdrawal from the Macau event, necessitated by the slow pace of her rehabilitation, saw her world ranking fall to No. 289. Raducanu's recovery included working with different types of tennis balls to regain her form, while lacking a dedicated coach or team.

=== 2024: Return to top 100, first top 10 wins ===
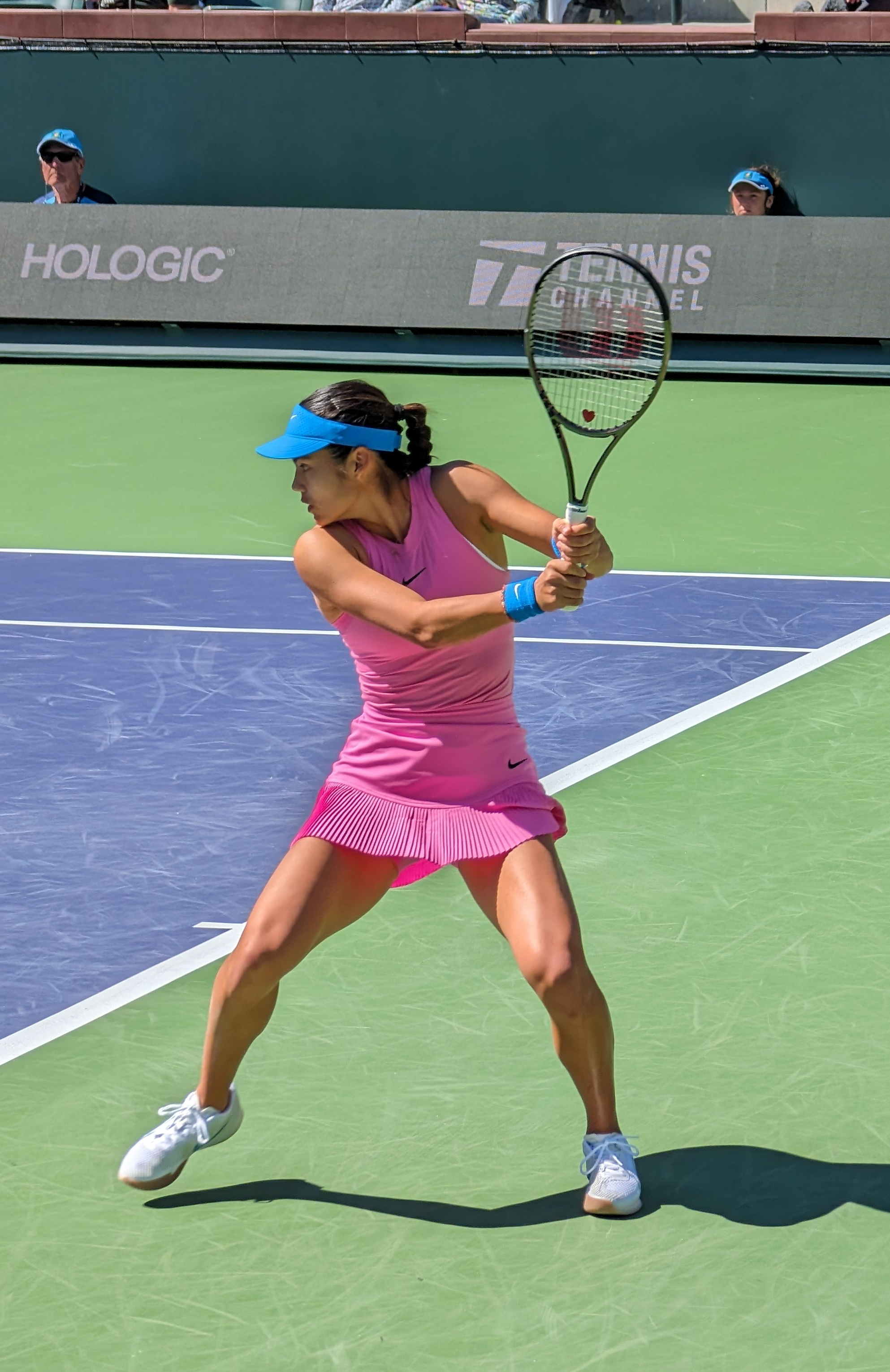
Raducanu at the 2024 Indian Wells Open

It was announced in December 2023 that Raducanu was to return to the tour in January 2024. She accepted a wildcard into the Auckland Open where she lost in the second round to second seed and eventual finalist Elina Svitolina.

She also entered the Australian Open with a protected ranking of No. 103. This ranking initially placed her outside the main-draw entry cut-off, requiring her to enter through qualification; however, a series of withdrawals allowed her to avoid qualifying and enter into the main draw. Raducanu had been without a coach since her injury hiatus, and had been under scrutiny for an unorthodox strategy of rapidly hiring and dismissing coaches – she confirmed her partnership with former junior coach, and former head coach of the LTA Loughborough Academy, Nick Cavaday. In the week before the Australian Open, Raducanu was set to play two exhibition tournaments, she later withdrew from both of them, citing soreness; it was indicated this was a precaution rather than a new injury. In the first round of the Australian Open, Raducanu defeated Shelby Rogers in straight sets. In the second round, she lost in three sets to Wang Yafan.

Raducanu's season continued with a straight-sets victory against Marie Bouzková at the Abu Dhabi Open, losing to Ons Jabeur in the second round. A lacklustre performance followed at the Qatar Ladies Open, where Raducanu lost to Anhelina Kalinina, being served a bagel in the first set. She did not play until the Indian Wells Open where she reached the third round for the first time since the 2023 edition of the event, beating qualifier Rebeka Masarova and 30th seed Dayana Yastremska who retired four games into the first set. She lost to second seed Aryna Sabalenka in the third round, marking her sixth loss against a top-10 player. Raducanu received a wildcard into the main draw of the Miami Open, but withdrew before her scheduled first-round match against Wang Xiyu, citing a lower back injury.

Raducanu began her clay-court season with the BJK Cup team, playing a tie against France in Le Portel. She defeated Caroline Garcia and Diane Parry to help Great Britain qualify for the Billie Jean King Cup finals. Raducanu was also awarded a wildcard for the Stuttgart Open and defeated local wildcard Angelique Kerber and Linda Nosková both in straight sets to reach her first quarterfinal since 2022. As a result, she moved more than 80 positions up, back into the top 250. In the quarterfinal, she lost to world No. 1, Iga Swiatek, in straight sets. Raducanu entered the Madrid Open as a wildcard, and lost to qualifier María Lourdes Carlé in the first round in straight sets, citing "physical and emotional exhaustion". She withdrew from the Italian Open qualifying, and after no wildcard was offered, withdrew from the French Open qualifying, stating that she will train for the impending grass and American hardcourt season.

In June 2024, Raducanu started her grass-court season at the Nottingham Open where she reached the semifinals and lost against Katie Boulter. She continued her Wimbledon warm-up at the Eastbourne International, beating the second seed and getting her first top ten win against Jessica Pegula. Raducanu lost in the next round to Daria Kasatkina, in straight sets. At Wimbledon, Raducanu beat Renata Zarazúa, Elise Mertens, and got her second top-10 victory against world No. 9, Maria Sakkari, to return to the fourth round and the top 100. She did not advance, being out-played against New Zealand qualifier Lulu Sun.

In her first tournament after Wimbledon, Raducanu reached the quarterfinals at the Washington Open with wins over eighth seed Elise Martens, and Peyton Stearns before losing to Paula Badosa in three sets.

Raducanu lost in the first round at the US Open, going down in three sets to Sofia Kenin. Her next tournament was the Korea Open where she defeated Peyton Stearns and Yuan Yue to reach the quarterfinals, where she retired with an injury to her left foot, after losing the opening set to Daria Kasatkina. Raducanu subsequently withdrew from the China Open, Ningbo Open and Hong Kong Open due to the same injury.

Raducanu made her return to competitive action in November at the BJK Cup finals in Spain, where she defeated Jule Niemeier in straight sets in Great Britain's first-round win over Germany. She then overcame Rebecca Marino as the British team defeated defending champions Canada to reach the semifinals. In their last four match against Slovakia, Raducanu defeated Viktória Hrunčáková in straight sets but the British team lost the tie 2–1. In December, Raducanu confirmed she had started working with fitness trainer Yutaka Nakamura, who previously worked with Maria Sharapova and Naomi Osaka, ahead of the 2025 season.

=== 2025: Back to top 30, early season ending ===
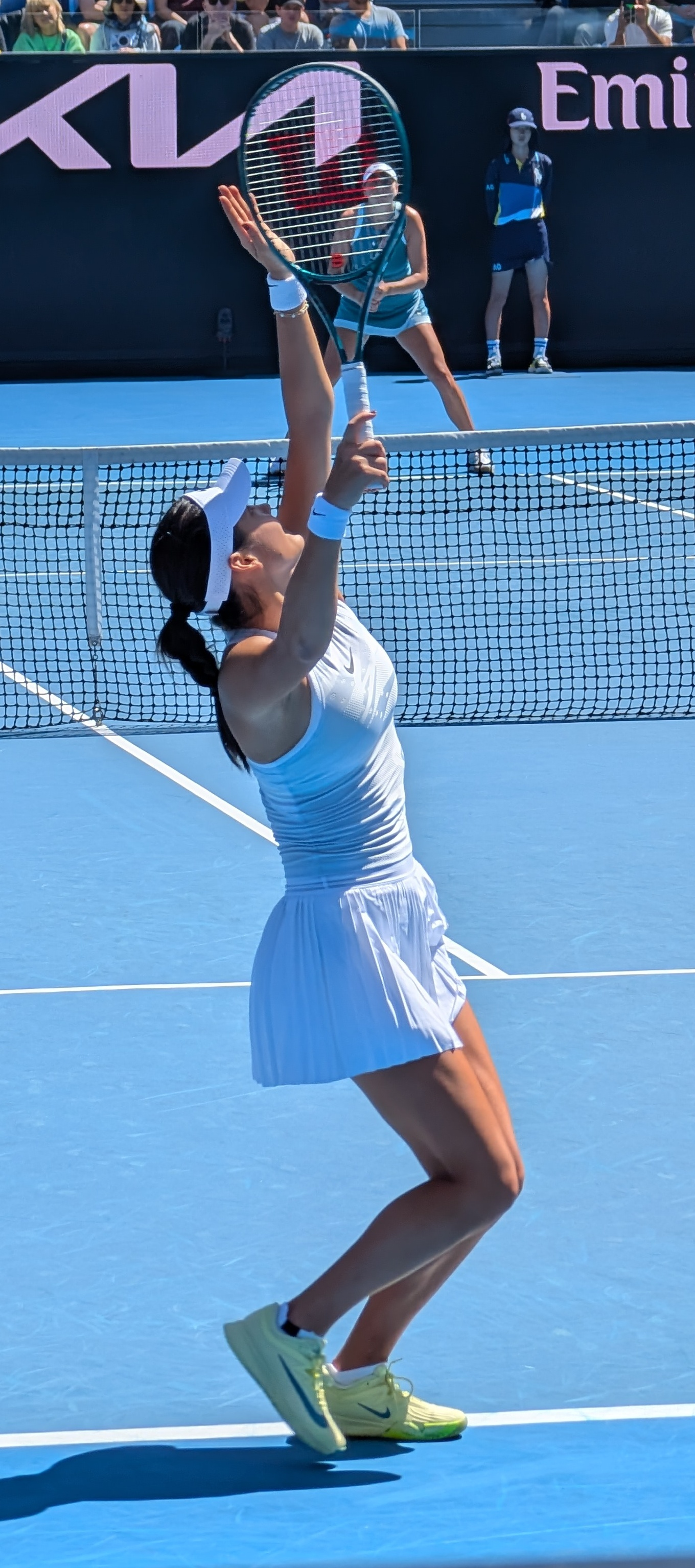
Raducanu at the 2025 Australian Open serving against Anisimova

Raducanu was scheduled to start her 2025 season at the Auckland Open but withdrew due to a back injury. Her first competitive match of the year was at the Australian Open, defeating 26th seed Ekaterina Alexandrova in two sets that both went to tiebreaks. Raducanu then overcame Amanda Anisimova in straight sets to reach the third round at this major for the first time. She lost to second seed Iga Świątek, in straight sets.

It was announced on 24 January, that Raducanu had stopped working with coach Nick Cavaday due to issues with his health. Seeded seventh at her next tournament, the Singapore Open, she lost in the first round to Cristina Bucșa in three sets. The following week, she received a wildcard into the main draw at the Abu Dhabi Open, but again lost her opening match, this time to fellow wildcard entrant Markéta Vondroušová. Raducanu was given a wildcard entry into the Qatar Ladies Open, losing once more in the first round, going down to Ekaterina Alexandrova in straight sets for her fourth successive defeat which was her longest losing streak of her career to date. She finally ended her run of defeats at the Dubai Championships, where she entered as a wildcard once more and overcame Maria Sakkari in the first round. Raducanu lost to 14th seed Karolína Muchová in the second round.

In March, Raducanu lost in the first round at Indian Wells to Moyuka Uchijima. At the Miami Open, she overcame wildcard entrant Sayaka Ishii in her opening match to record her first career win at the tournament. Raducanu then defeated eighth seed Emma Navarro, McCartney Kessler and 17th seed Amanda Anisimova to reach the quarterfinals of a WTA 1000 event for the first time. She lost in the last eight to fourth seed Jessica Pegula, in three sets. As a result of her Miami run, Raducanu returned to the world's top-50 for the first time since September 2022, rising 12 places to No. 48 on 31 March. She withdrew from Great Britain's squad for the Billie Jean King qualifiers in April, citing the need for "space in the calendar to best look after her body".

Raducanu returned to competitive action at the Madrid Open, defeating Suzan Lamens in the first round, before losing her next match to 24th seed Marta Kostyuk. At the next WTA 1000 event, the Italian Open, she overcame qualifier Maya Joint and lucky loser Jil Teichmann to reach the third round at the tournament for the first time, where she defeated Veronika Kudermetova in three sets. Raducanu lost to fourth seed Coco Gauff in her next match. She was given a wildcard into the Strasbourg Open, where she defeated sixth seed Daria Kasatkina, before losing to Danielle Collins in the second round.

At the French Open, Raducanu defeated Wang Xinyu, before losing to Iga Świątek in straight sets for the second successive major.

Raducanu began her grass-court season in June at the Queen's Club Championships in London, where she defeated qualifier Cristina Bucșa and Rebecca Šramková to reach the quarterfinals, before losing to top seed Zheng Qinwen. She withdrew from the following week's Berlin Tennis Open as she attempted to manage an ongoing back problem. Seeded seventh at the Eastbourne Open, Raducanu defeated Ann Li, before losing to the eventual champion Maya Joint in the second round. At Wimbledon, she overcame fellow Briton Mimi Xu and 2023 champion Markéta Vondroušová to reach the third round, at which point she lost to world No. 1, Aryna Sabalenka.

Raducanu began the North American hardcourt swing of the season at the Washington Open, where she defeated seventh seed Marta Kostyuk in the first round, followed by wins over wildcard entrants Naomi Osaka and Maria Sakkari to reach the semifinals, where she lost to Anna Kalinskaya. Partnering with Elena Rybakina, she also made it through to the semifinals in the doubles at the same tournament, but the pair retired while trailing in the first set against second seeds and eventual champions, Taylor Townsend and Zhang Shuai.

At the Canadian Open, Raducanu defeated Elena-Gabriela Ruse and 32nd seed Peyton Stearns to make it into the third round, where she lost to fifth seed Amanda Anisimova. In early August, she started working with new coach Francisco Roig who had previously coached Rafael Nadal. Seeded 30th at the Cincinnati Open, she was given a bye in the first round and then overcame Olga Danilović to reach the third round. There she lost to Sabalenka in a match that lasted three hours and nine minutes and which was decided in a final set tiebreak.

At the US Open, Raducanu defeated qualifier Ena Shibahara in the first round for her first victory at the event since winning the title in 2021. Next she overcame qualifier Janice Tjen to reach the third round, losing to ninth-seed Elena Rybakina in straight sets.

In September, Raducanu withdrew from Great Britain's squad for the BJK Cup finals in order to play at the Korea Open instead. Seeded eighth, she defeated Jaqueline Cristian, before losing to Barbora Krejčíková in the second round after failing to convert three match points during the second set. At the China Open, Raducanu received a bye due to being seeded 30th and then defeated Cristina Bucșa to make it into the third round, at which point she lost to fifth seed Jessica Pegula despite having three match points during the second set. Raducanu retired due to dizziness while trailing by a set and a double break of serve during her first-round match against Ann Li at the Wuhan Open. The following week at the Ningbo Open, she lost to wildcard entrant Zhu Lin in the first round. On 16 October, Raducanu announced she was ending her season early due to illness.

=== 2026: First WTA 250 & 500 finals, further injury ===
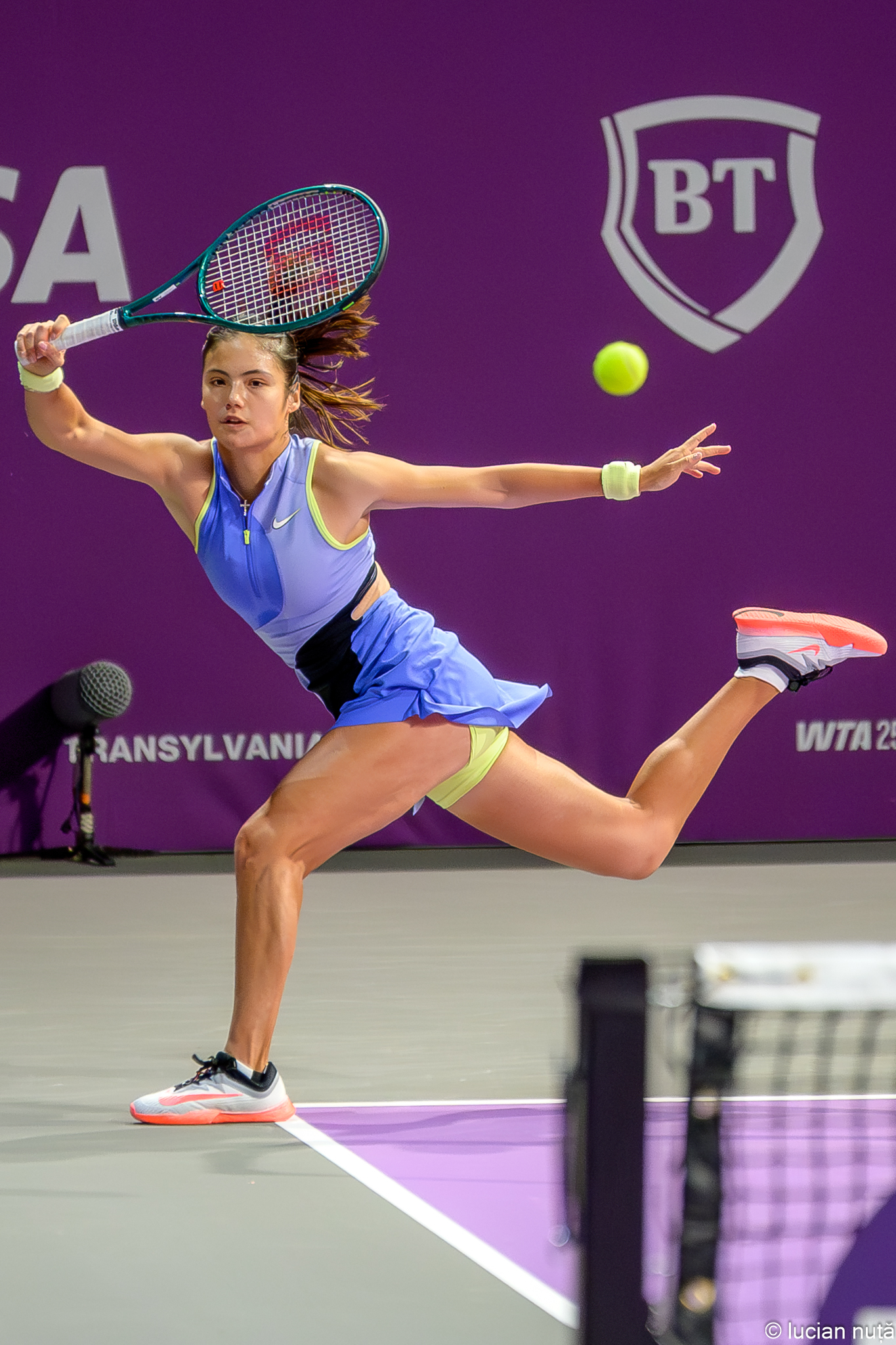
Raducanu at the 2026 Transylvania Open

Starting the season ranked No. 29, Raducanu was scheduled to play against Naomi Osaka in a tie between Great Britain and Japan at the 2026 United Cup. She was later replaced by her teammate Katie Swan. Raducanu lost to Greece's Maria Sakkari in three sets; her first loss against Sakkari after four straight set wins. Raducanu entered into the 2026 Hobart International as the top seed, losing in the quarterfinals to world No. 204, Taylah Preston. She defeated Mananchaya Sawangkaew in the first round of the 2026 Australian Open and subsequently lost to Anastasia Potapova in the second round. Shortly after the Australian Open, Raducanu announced parting ways with coach Francis Roig.

In February, Raducanu played as the top-seed at the 2026 Transylvania Open and reached her first final at a WTA Tour event, and a new professional final since her triumph at 2021 US Open. She lost to third seed and home favourite, Sorana Cîrstea, in the championship match. After first-round losses in Doha and Dubai, it was announced she would work again with former coach Mark Petchey on an informal basis leading up to the Sunshine Double.

Following an early-round loss at Indian Wells, she withdrew from Miami citing post-viral illness. She returned late in the clay season at Strasbourg where she reunited with former coach Andrew Richardson. She lost in the first round of the French Open in straight sets to Solana Sierra. The grass-court season began at the Queen's Club where she was defeated in the final by Donna Vekić.

In June, Raducanu pulled out of the Wimbledon Championships due to a stress fracture in her lower right leg.

== Playing style ==
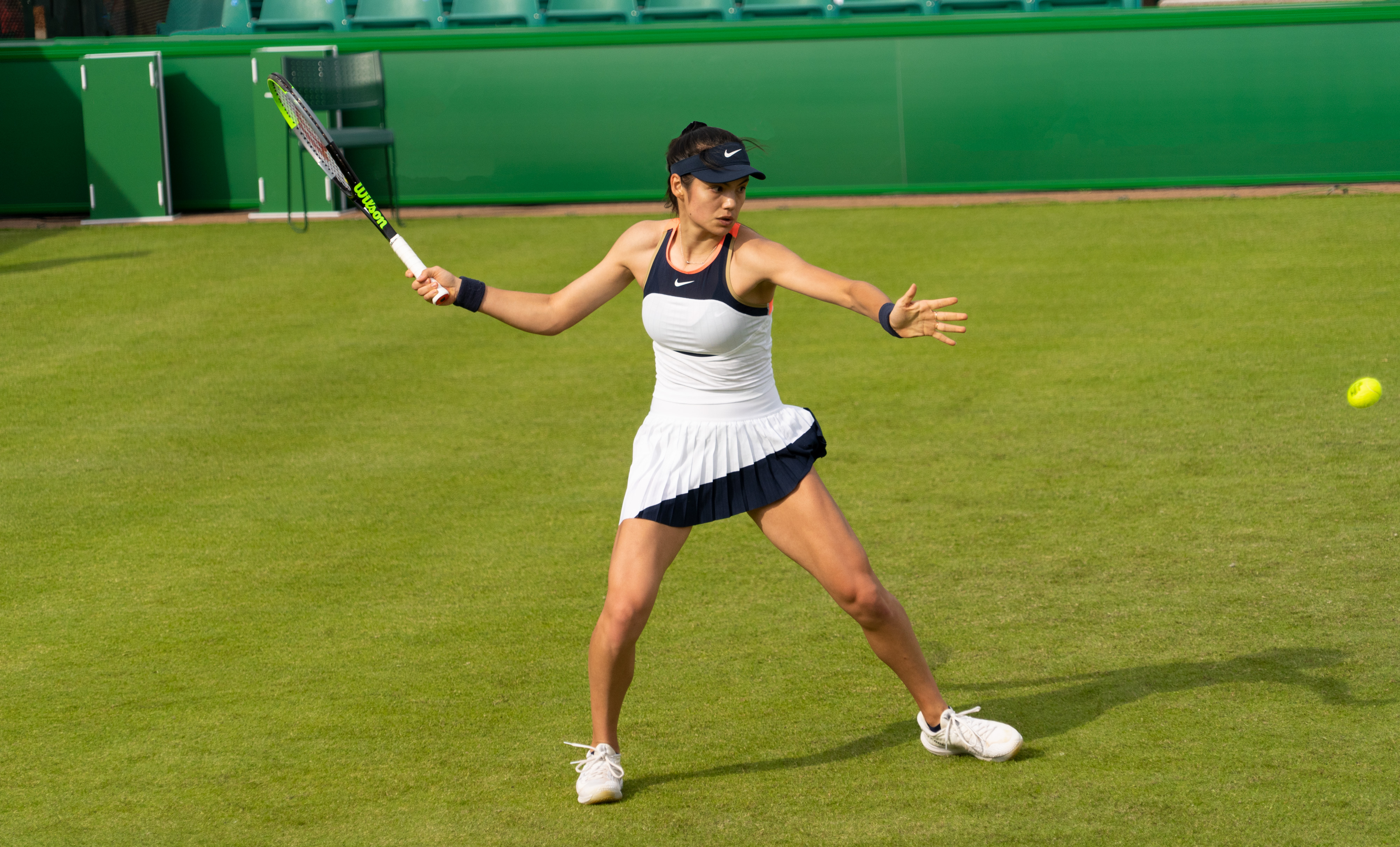
Emma Raducanu playing a forehand shot at the 2021 Nottingham Open

Raducanu is primarily a baseline player, with an aggressive style of play. She hits the ball early, and is adept at redirecting power down the line. Her best groundstroke is her two-handed backhand, which was described as "world-class" by former British No. 1 Anne Keothavong. Raducanu can hit her backhand one-handed with slice, to break up the pace of rallies and disrupt her opponent's rhythm, but she does not use this shot often.

Raducanu has a strong forehand, although it is more volatile than her backhand. Her serve is strong, peaking at 110 mph (180 km/h), and she has a consistent ball toss, and accurate serve positioning. Raducanu's most effective serve is a wide, sliced serve, which she used during the 2021 US Open. Raducanu's second serve is typically delivered at a higher speed than the Women's Tennis Association (WTA) average, at 93 mph (150 km/h), allowing her to play offensively even after missing a first serve. She is known for her return of serve. She keeps opponents deep in the court by taking the ball early, and hitting hard down the line, whilst attacking short second serves by going for return winners.

Her movement, court coverage, footwork, speed, and anticipation allow her to rally and defend effectively against opponents. She blends good point construction with tactical flexibility, making it difficult for opponents to read her game. Despite typically playing from the baseline, Raducanu is a capable net player, and she possesses an effective drop shot. Raducanu is comfortable on all surfaces, although she has stated that she prefers hard courts, where she won her only major title.

== Personal life ==
Raducanu has stated she would like to become as athletic as Simona Halep, and aspires to the mentality and sporting ethics of Li Na.

Raducanu is a fan of Formula One and the football club Tottenham Hotspur.

On 28 January 2022, a man named Amrit Magar was found guilty of stalking Raducanu at her home. Raducanu said that the incidents made her feel unsafe in her house and concerned about going out alone. On 23 February 2022, the offender was sentenced to community service and given a five-year restraining order.

On 19 February 2025, a man who had previously approached her and was described by the WTA as having "exhibited fixated behaviour" was spotted in the crowd during one of her matches in Dubai. Raducanu started crying and the man was removed from the stadium and subsequently banned from all WTA events. The man was reported to have given Raducanu a letter at her hotel prior to the match. The man signed a restraining order committing to distancing from Raducanu on 20 February 2025. He was later blocked from joining the ballot to buy tickets for Wimbledon 2025.

== Endorsements ==
Raducanu is sponsored by Uniqlo for clothing, and by Wilson for racquets, currently endorsing the Wilson Blade range of racquets; despite this, she uses the Wilson Steam 100 on court, painted as a Wilson Blade.

Raducanu's popularity and marketability increased considerably after her US Open victory, with sports analysts noting her potential to appeal to multiple markets. Her net worth was estimated to be at least £13.5 million in a June 2025 article. Raducanu signed with sports agency IMG while on the junior circuit and has been represented by executive Max Eisenbud. She was ranked the 12th-most-marketable athlete in the world in 2022 by SportsPro.

In September 2021, Raducanu became an ambassador for jewellery brand Tiffany & Co. and Dior in October 2021. In December 2021, she signed with British Airways and French bottled water brand Evian. She also starred alongside other British sportspeople and celebrities in a Christmas advertisement for sporting goods retailer Sports Direct in November 2021.

Raducanu became an ambassador for British telecommunications firm Vodafone and German automobile manufacturer Porsche in March 2022. In June 2022, Raducanu signed a four-year deal with British multinational bank HSBC. In the run-up to the 2022 Wimbledon Championships, Raducanu starred in a number of marketing campaigns for Vodafone and Evian, who are also sponsors of Wimbledon.

Raducanu added to her portfolio in June 2023 with American digital media platform AirWayz, where she offers online tennis coaching for $2000 per session. According to AirWayz, the proceeds are directed towards the LTA's Youth Coaching Programme.

In April 2025, Vodafone ended their partnership with Raducanu. Despite speculation that a number of her more high-value sponsorships had expired by the end of 2025, Raducanu appeared to have begun a new sponsorship with deodorant brand Wild, a Unilever brand.

== Awards and honours ==
In November 2021, Raducanu was named Sportswoman of the Year by the Sunday Times. The Guardian ranked the 2021 US Open final number 47 on their 50 best TV shows of 2021 list. Raducanu won Sportswoman of the Year and the Peter Wilson Trophy for international newcomer in December 2021, awarded by the Sports Journalists' Association. She was voted the 2021 WTA Newcomer of the Year by the WTA. On 19 December 2021, Raducanu was named the BBC Sports Personality of the Year, becoming the first female tennis player to win the trophy since Virginia Wade in 1977. She was appointed Member of the Order of the British Empire (MBE) in the 2022 New Year Honours for her contribution to tennis.

In March 2022, Raducanu was named Sports Star of the Year at the Stylist's Remarkable Women Awards 2022. In April 2022, Raducanu won the Laureus World Sports Award for Breakthrough of the Year award. She won the Best Athlete, Women's Tennis award at the 2022 ESPY Awards.

== Career statistics ==
=== Grand Slam tournament performance timeline ===
Key
| W | F | SF | QF | #R | RR | Q# | DNQ | A | NH |

(W) winner; (F) finalist; (SF) semifinalist; (QF) quarterfinalist; (#R) rounds 4, 3, 2, 1; (RR) round-robin stage; (Q#) qualification round; (DNQ) did not qualify; (A) absent; (NH) not held; (SR) strike rate (events won / competed); (W–L) win–loss record.
To avoid confusion and double counting, these charts are updated at the conclusion of a tournament or when the player's participation has ended.

==== Singles ====
| Tournament | 2018 | 2019 | 2020 | 2021 | 2022 | 2023 | 2024 | 2025 | 2026 | SR | W–L | !Win % |
|---|---|---|---|---|---|---|---|---|---|---|---|---|
| Australian Open | A | A | A | A | 2R | 2R | 2R | 3R | 2R | 0 / 5 | 6–5 | 55% |
| French Open | A | A | A | A | 2R | A | A | 2R | 1R | 0 / 3 | 2–3 | 40% |
| Wimbledon | Q1 | Q1 | NH | 4R | 2R | A | 4R | 3R | A | 0 / 4 | 9–4 | 69% |
| US Open | A | A | A | W | 1R | A | 1R | 3R | A | 1 / 4 | 9–3 | 75% |
| Win–loss | 0–0 | 0–0 | 0–0 | 10–1 | 3–4 | 1–1 | 4–3 | 7–4 | 1–2 | 1 / 16 | 26–15 | 63% |

=== Grand Slam tournament finals ===
==== Singles: 1 (title) ====
| Result | Year | Tournament | Surface | Opponent | Score |
|---|---|---|---|---|---|
| Win | 2021 | US Open | Hard | (Canada) Leylah Fernandez | 6–4, 6–3 |

=== Tennis records ===
| Tournament | Year | Record accomplished | Player tied | Ref |
|---|---|---|---|---|
| US Open | 2021 | Major singles title as a qualifier | stands alone | |
| US Open | 2021 | Major singles final as a qualifier | Maja Chwalińska | |
| US Open | 2021 | Major singles title with two or fewer major main-draw appearances | stands alone | |
| US Open | 2021 | Major singles title in their second major main-draw appearance | stands alone | |
| US Open | 2021 | Singles title in first US Open main-draw appearance | Bianca Andreescu | |
