= 2026 Transylvania Open – Doubles =

Doubles
- 2026 Transylvania Open

Final
- Champions: (Uzbekistan) Kamilla Rakhimova (Spain) Sara Sorribes Tormo
- Runners-up: (China) Wang Xinyu (China) Zheng Saisai
- Score: 7–6^{(9–7)}, 6–3

Events
Singles	Doubles
- Transylvania Open

Kamilla Rakhimova and Sara Sorribes Tormo defeated Wang Xinyu and Zheng Saisai in the final, 7–6^{(9–7)}, 6–3 to win the doubles tennis title at the 2026 Transylvania Open.

Magali Kempen and Anna Sisková were the reigning champions, but Sisková chose to compete in Ostrava instead. Kempen partnered Ulrikke Eikeri, but they lost in the first round to Wang and Zheng.

== Seeds ==
1. (Norway) Ulrikke Eikeri / (Belgium) Magali Kempen (first round)
2. Maria Kozyreva / Iryna Shymanovich (withdrew)
3. (Uzbekistan) Kamilla Rakhimova / (Spain) Sara Sorribes Tormo (champions)
4. (China) Tang Qianhui / (China) Yuan Yue (first round)

== Draw ==
Key

- Q = Qualifier
- WC = Wild card
- LL = Lucky loser
- Alt = Alternate
- ITF = ITF entry
- PR = Protected ranking
- SR = Special ranking
- SE = Special exempt
- JE = Junior exempt
- JR = Junior Accelerator Programme entrant
- CO = College Accelerator Programme entrant
- NG = Next Gen Accelerator Program entrant
- w/o = Walkover
- r = Retired
- d = Defaulted

=== Draw ===
First round
1	(Norway) U Eikeri (Belgium) M Kempen	7^{7}	4	[8]
(China) Xin Wang (China) S Zheng	6^{5}	6	[10]
(Romania) I Bara (Georgia (country)) E Gorgodze	1	6	[10]
(Czech Republic) A Kučmová (Czech Republic) A Laboutková	6	2	[2]
4	(China) Q Tang (China) Y Yuan	4	3
(Romania) J Cristian (Romania) E-G Ruse	6	6
WC	(Romania) ER Bertea (Romania) B Szabó	3	2
(Hong Kong) E Chong (Chinese Taipei) E-s Liang	6	6
(Poland) M Chwalińska (Slovenia) K Juvan	3	6	[10]
(Hungary) A Bondár (Belgium) G Minnen	6	3	[8]
(Chinese Taipei) I-h Cho (Chinese Taipei) Y-t Cho	4	2
3	(Uzbekistan) K Rakhimova (Spain) S Sorribes Tormo	6	6
WC	(Romania) M Bulgaru (Romania) M Gae	1	4
(Slovenia) V Erjavec (France) T Rakotomanga Rajaonah	6	6
(Slovenia) D Jakupović (Slovenia) N Radišić	w/o
2	M Kozyreva; I Shymanovich

Quarterfinals
(China) Xin Wang (China) S Zheng	7	6
(Romania) I Bara (Georgia (country)) E Gorgodze	5	3
(Romania) J Cristian (Romania) E-G Ruse	6	7
(Hong Kong) E Chong (Chinese Taipei) E-s Liang	2	5
(Poland) M Chwalińska (Slovenia) K Juvan	2	3
3	(Uzbekistan) K Rakhimova (Spain) S Sorribes Tormo	6	6
(Slovenia) V Erjavec (France) T Rakotomanga Rajaonah	7^{7}	3	[10]
(Slovenia) D Jakupović (Slovenia) N Radišić	6^{5}	6	[6]

Semifinals
(China) Xin Wang (China) S Zheng	6	2	[10]
(Romania) J Cristian (Romania) E-G Ruse	3	6	[5]
3	(Uzbekistan) K Rakhimova (Spain) S Sorribes Tormo	6	6^{6}	[11]
(Slovenia) V Erjavec (France) T Rakotomanga Rajaonah	2	7^{8}	[9]

Final
(China) Xin Wang (China) S Zheng	6^{7}	3
3	(Uzbekistan) K Rakhimova (Spain) S Sorribes Tormo	7^{9}	6
