= 2026 Transylvania Open =

- Date: 1–7 February
- Edition: 6th
- Category: WTA 250
- Draw: 32S / 16Q / 16D
- Prize money: $283,347
- Surface: Hard (Indoor)
- Location: Cluj-Napoca, Romania
- Venue: BT Arena

Champions

Singles
- (Romania) Sorana Cîrstea

Doubles
- (Uzbekistan) Kamilla Rakhimova / (Spain) Sara Sorribes Tormo
- Transylvania Open

The 2026 Transylvania Open was a women's tennis tournament played on indoor hard courts. It was the sixth edition of the Transylvania Open, and part of the WTA 250 series of the 2026 WTA Tour. It was held at the BT Arena in Cluj-Napoca, Romania, from 1 until 7 February 2026.

== Champions ==
=== Singles ===
- (Romania) Sorana Cîrstea def. (United Kingdom) Emma Raducanu, 6–0, 6–2

=== Doubles ===
- (Uzbekistan) Kamilla Rakhimova / (Spain) Sara Sorribes Tormo def. (China) Wang Xinyu / (China) Zheng Saisai, 7–6^{(9–7)}, 6–3

== Singles main draw entrants ==
=== Seeds ===
Country	Player	Rank^{1}	Seed
GBR	Emma Raducanu	29	1
ROU	Jaqueline Cristian	35	2
ROU	Sorana Cîrstea	41	3
CHN	Wang Xinyu	46	4
AUT	Anastasia Potapova	55	5
CRO	Antonia Ružić	65	6
SRB	Olga Danilović	69	7
HUN	Anna Bondár	74	8

^{1} Rankings are as of 19 January 2026.

=== Other entrants ===
The following players received wildcards into the main draw:

- (Romania) Elena Ruxandra Bertea
- (Romania) Ana Bogdan
- (Romania) Miriam Bulgaru
- (Czech Republic) Karolína Plíšková

The following player received entry using a protected ranking:

- (Spain) Sara Sorribes Tormo

The following players received entry from the qualifying draw:

- (Poland) Maja Chwalińska
- (Spain) Kaitlin Quevedo
- (Ukraine) Daria Snigur
- (Italy) Lucrezia Stefanini

The following player received entry as a lucky loser:

- (Slovenia) Tamara Zidanšek

=== Withdrawals ===
- (Italy) Elisabetta Cocciaretto → replaced by (Switzerland) Rebeka Masarova
- (France) Varvara Gracheva → replaced by (France) Tiantsoa Rakotomanga Rajaonah
- (Croatia) Petra Marčinko → replaced by (Belgium) Greet Minnen
- (Colombia) Camila Osorio → replaced by (Slovenia) Tamara Zidanšek (LL)
- (Croatia) Donna Vekić → replaced by (Bulgaria) Viktoriya Tomova

== Doubles main draw entrants ==
=== Seeds ===
Country	Player	Country	Player	Rank^{1}	Seed
NOR	Ulrikke Eikeri	BEL	Magali Kempen	99	1
	Maria Kozyreva		Iryna Shymanovich	138	2
UZB	Kamilla Rakhimova	ESP	Sara Sorribes Tormo	155	3
CHN	Tang Qianhui	CHN	Yuan Yue	158	4

^{1} Rankings are as of 19 January 2026.

=== Other entrants ===
The following pairs received wildcards into the doubles main draw:

- (Romania) Elena Ruxandra Bertea / (Romania) Briana Szabó
- (Romania) Miriam Bulgaru / (Romania) Mara Gae
