= Sara Sorribes Tormo =

Spanish tennis player (born 1996)

Sara Sorribes
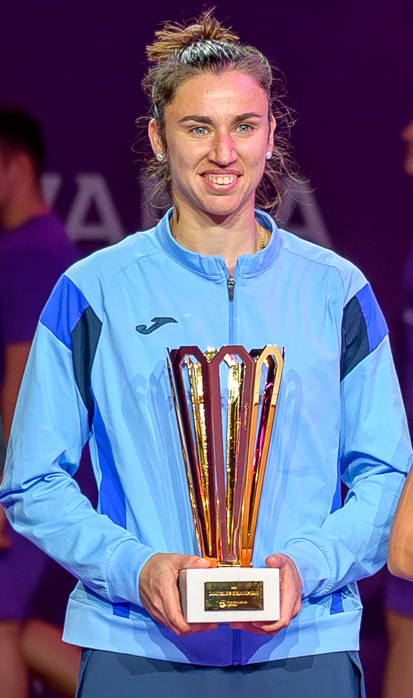
- Sorribes at the 2026 Transylvania Open
- Full name: Sara Sorribes Tormo
- Country (sports): Spain
- Residence: La Vall d'Uixó, Spain
- Born: 8 October 1996 (age 30) Castellón de la Plana, Spain
- Height: 1.76 m (5 ft 9 in)
- Turned pro: 2010
- Plays: Right-handed (two-handed backhand)
- Coach: Sílvia Soler Espinosa
- Prize money: US$ 5,890,439

Singles
- Career record: 440–305
- Career titles: 2
- Highest ranking: No. 32 (7 February 2022)
- Current ranking: No. 194 (28 September 2026)

Grand Slam singles results
- Australian Open: 2R (2020, 2022)
- French Open: 4R (2023)
- Wimbledon: 2R (2018, 2021, 2022, 2023, 2026)
- US Open: 3R (2021)

Other tournaments
- Olympic Games: 3R (2021)

Doubles
- Career record: 156–108
- Career titles: 7
- Highest ranking: No. 17 (6 May 2024)
- Current ranking: No. 109 (28 September 2026)

Grand Slam doubles results
- Australian Open: QF (2022, 2025)
- French Open: QF (2023)
- Wimbledon: SF (2023)
- US Open: QF (2022)

Other mixed doubles tournaments
- Olympic Games: 1R (2024)

Team competitions
- Fed Cup: 13–7
Medal record
Representing Spain
Olympic Games
Bronze medal – third place	2024 Paris	Doubles
Mediterranean Games
Silver medal – second place	Mersin 2013	Singles
- Last updated on: 4 October 2026.

Sara Sorribes Tormo (Spanish pronunciation: [ˈsaɾa soˈriβes ˈtoɾmo]; born 8 October 1996) is a Spanish professional tennis player. She has a career-high singles ranking of 32 by the WTA, achieved on 7 February 2022, and a best doubles ranking of No. 17, reached on 6 May 2024. Her most notable result is a bronze medal in the women's doubles at the 2024 Summer Olympics, with Cristina Bucșa.

She has won nine WTA Tour titles combined, two in singles and seven in doubles, as well as two doubles titles on the WTA 125 level. On the ITF Circuit, she has won eleven singles and five doubles titles.

Sorribes Tormo made her WTA Tour main-draw debut at the 2015 Rio Open, after making it through the qualifying rounds. Her first appearance at a major tournament came at 2015 French Open but she failed to qualify, while her main-draw debut at a major happened at the 2016 French Open, when she passed qualifying draw. Her most significant results in 2017 was reaching the semifinals of the WTA Tour events at the 2017 Copa Colsanitas in Bogotá, Colombia in April and at the 2017 Ladies Championship Gstaad, Switzerland in July. During that season, she used to play at ITF tournaments.

Her first major match-win came at the 2018 Wimbledon Championships, where she defeated Kaia Kanepi in the first round.

Sorribes Tormo won her maiden WTA Tour title at the 2021 Abierto Zapopan, Mexico.

Playing for Spain Fed Cup team, Sorribes Tormo made her debut in the 2015 Fed Cup World Group II Play-offs, and has accumulated a win–loss record of 6–4.

== Early life and background ==
Sorribes Tormo was born on 8 October 1996 in Castellón de la Plana in Spain. Her mother owns a souvenir shop and used to be a tennis instructor, and her father works in real estate and used to play pro soccer. Her mother introduced her to the sport at age 6. Her favorite surface is clay. Her current residence is La Vall d'Uixó, Spain.

== Career ==
=== 2012–15: Juniors, WTA Tour debut, top 200 ===
In Juniors, Sorribes Tormo won three singles and three doubles titles on the ITF junior circuit. She was also runner-up at 2013 US Open in doubles, where together with Belinda Bencic, they lost to the Czech duo Barbora Krejčíková & Kateřina Siniaková. In 2014, she won the European Junior Championships, defeating her countrymate Paula Badosa in the final. She reached a Junior combined ranking of No. 33 in January 2014.

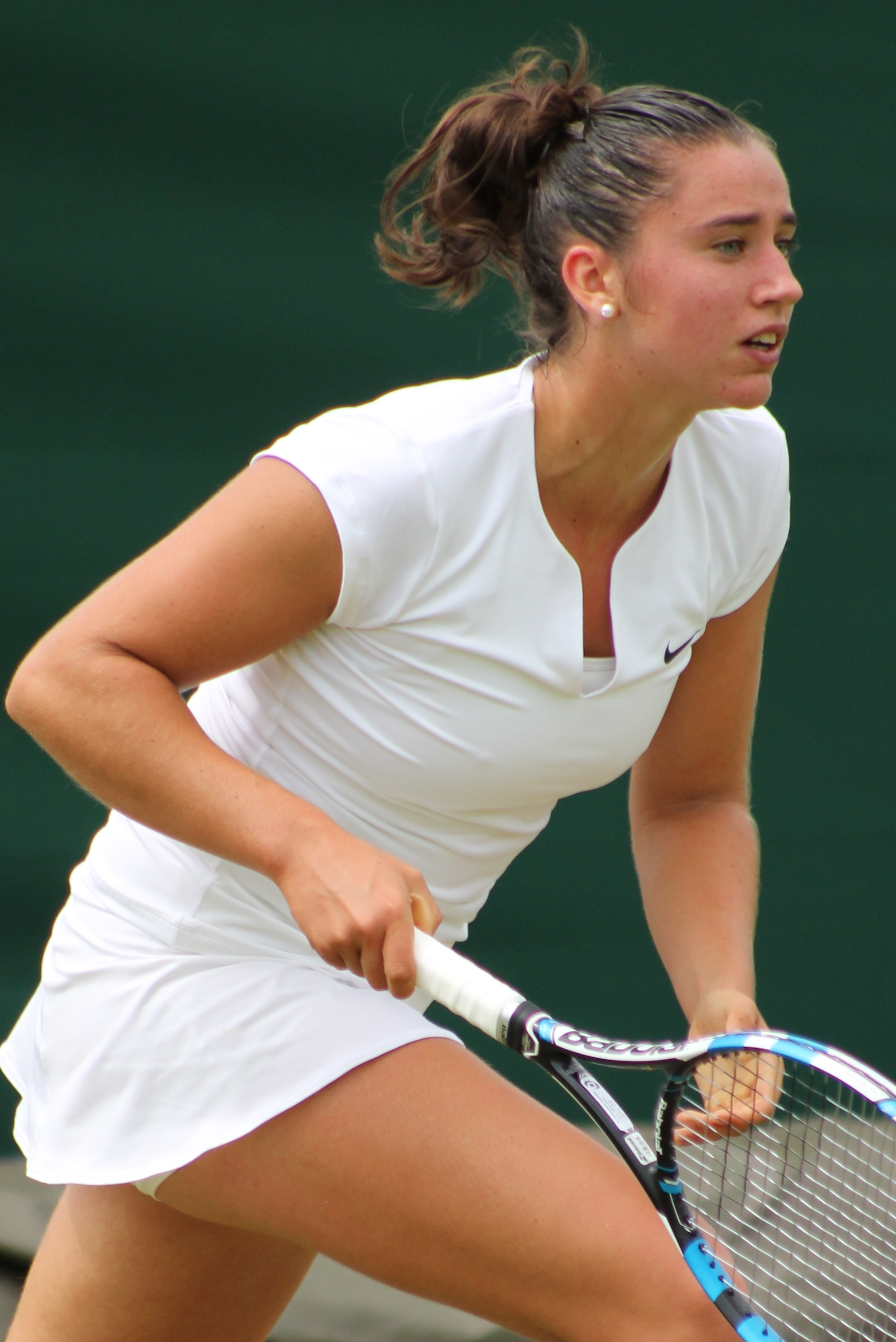
Sorribes Tormo at the 2015 Wimbledon qualifying

On the professional tour, Sorribes Tormo played in her first main draw on the at the 2012 Barcelona Open, where she lost in first round of qualifying to Ani Mijačika. At the 2012 Madrid Open, she received a wildcard for the qualifying, but lost in the first round to Varvara Lepchenko.

The following year, she received another wildcard chance for qualifying at Madrid but lost in the second round to Alexandra Dulgheru. At the Palermo Ladies Open and Swedish Open, she once failed to qualify for the main draw.

In 2014, she again received a wildcard for the Madrid Open qualifying but lost to Caroline Garcia in the first round. During the year, she got only one chance to debut in a WTA Tour main draw, but lost in the first round of qualifying at the Luxembourg Open to Barbora Krejčíková.

In 2015, she was successful on her first attempt to play in a tour main draw, passing qualifying at the Rio Open, where she lost in the first round to Paula Ormaechea. On 23 March 2015, Sara entered the top 200 for the first time, ranked 198th. At the Family Circle Cup, she went even further, reaching third round, defeating Anastasia Pavlyuchenkova and Shelby Rogers but then lost to Sara Errani. At Madrid, once again as a wildcard, she lost in the first round of qualifying to Bojana Jovanovski. She played at the French Open, which was her first appearance in a Grand Slam tournament qualifying. However, she lost to Shahar Pe'er in the first round. At Wimbledon, she lost in second round of qualifying to Yang Zhaoxuan.

=== 2016–17: Breakthrough in singles, major debut & top 100 ===
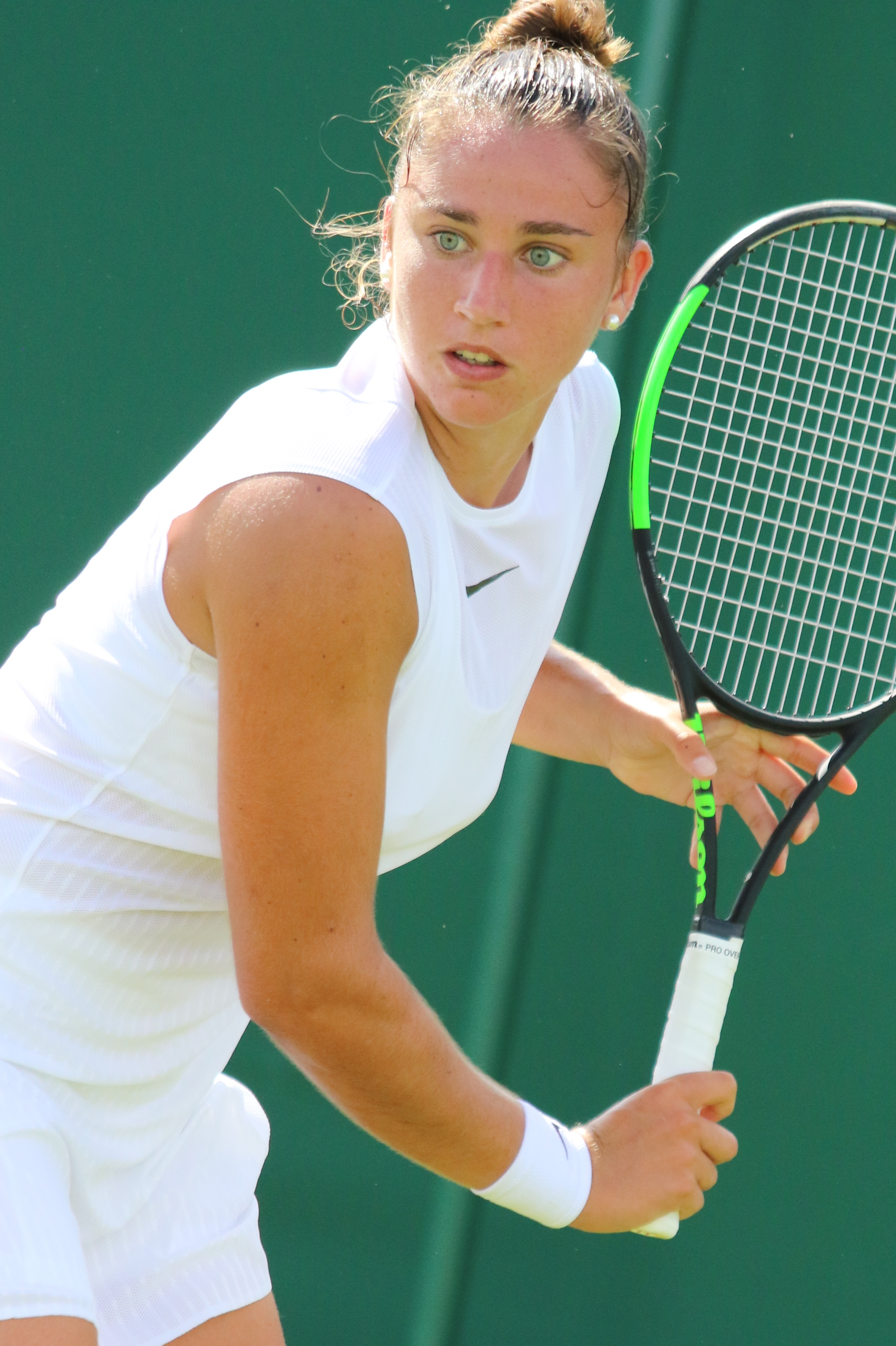
Sorribes Tormo at the 2017 Wimbledon

Sorribes Tormo did not start the 2016 season well in qualifyings at Brisbane, Hobart and the Australian Open, respectively. At Melbourne, she first defeated Cindy Burger but then lost to Zhu Lin. At the Morocco Open, she passed qualifying and in the main draw defeated Ons Jabeur, but wasn't good enough for Kiki Bertens in the second. Once again, with a wildcard for the Madrid Open, this time for the main draw, Sara lost to Samantha Stosur. It also was her first appearance in a Premier 5/Mandatory tournament main draw. At the French Open, she qualified for the first time for the main draw of a Grand Slam championship. In her debut match, she won only two games against Anastasia Pavlyuchenkova. At the Mallorca Open, she made her WTA Tour main-draw debut on grass, and her first match win, against compatriot Paula Badosa. In the second round she lost to Ana Ivanovic. At Wimbledon, she was stopped by Irina Khromacheva in the first round of qualifying. At the US Open, Sorribes was close to her main-draw debut, but lost to Kristína Kučová in the third round of qualifying. At the Korea Open, she made her first WTA Tour quarterfinal, before being defeated by Patricia Maria Țig. She finished the year as world No. 107, only one place behind her then-best ranking of 106, that she reached on 14 November 2016.

Sorribes Tormo started 2017 with two losses in qualifying, at Shenzhen Open and Hobart International, but then entered the main draw of the Australian Open. She faced fifth seed Karolína Plíšková but won only two games. At the Hungarian Ladies Open, she lost in the first round to Hsieh Su-wei, while at the Malaysian Open, she advanced to the second round, where she lost to Duan Yingying in three sets. For the first time, Sara in qualified for the Indian Wells Open. In the first round, she defeated Ekaterina Makarova, her first win at any Premier 5/Mandatory tournament, but in the second round, she wasn't good enough for sixth seed Agnieszka Radwańska. With this result, Sara debuted in the top 100 on 20 March 2017, reaching No. 99. At the Miami Open, she lost in the final stage of qualifying to Madison Brengle. At Monterrey Open, she got to the second round, where she lost to countrymate Carla Suárez Navarro. Finally, she recorded more recognizable results, reaching her first WTA semifinal at the Copa Colsanitas, where countrymate Lara Arruabarrena stopped her from reaching her first WTA Tour final. On 8 May 2017, Sara got to her then-best career ranking of 79, which was also her best ranking until 2019. At the Madrid Open, she lost in the first round to Samantha Stosur for the second year in a row. At the Italian Open, she failed in qualifying losing to CiCi Bellis. At the French Open, Sara lost to Timea Bacsinszky in straight sets. The grass season didn't end well, losing in the first rounds of the Mallorca Open to Anastasia Pavlyuchenkova, and Wimbledon to Naomi Osaka. In the second part of the clay-court season, Sara made her second career WTA semifinal at the Swiss Open. During her semifinal match against Kiki Bertens, after finishing the first set, Sara was forced to retire due to left wrist injury. At the Cincinnati Open, she lost in first round of qualifying to Monica Puig. Losing to Kurumi Nara in first round of US Open, Sara completed participation at all four Grand Slam events. By the end of 2017 season, she reached the quarterfinals of the Korea Open and Tianjin Open. She failed in qualifying for the China Open, losing to Andrea Petkovic in the final stage.

Sorribes Tormo finished the year as the No. 99 in the singles rankings.

=== 2018–20: First major and top-10 wins ===
In 2018, first tournament for Sara was Qatar Open, where she lost in final stage of qualifying to Kateryna Bondarenko. Next week, she played at Hungarian Open, where in first round Ysaline Bonaventure defeated her. At Indian Wells qualifying, she won against Allie Kiick and Ajla Tomljanović, and reserved her spot in the main draw, but lost to CiCi Bellis. At Miami, she lost in the first round of qualifying to Carol Zhao. Her first WTA Tour main-draw win in 2018 happened at the Monterrey Open, where she defeated Tereza Martincová, but lost in the second round to Ana Bogdan. Next week, she got to second round of Copa Colsanitas, where Lara Arruabarrena stopped her. At the Morocco Open, Aleksandra Krunić was better in second round. At Madrid, Sara earned her first win there against Madison Keys, but then lost to Kristýna Plíšková in the second round. At the French Open, she lost in second round of qualifying. At Wimbledon, Sara made her first singles grand-slam win, defeating Kaia Kanepi in first round, but lost to Suárez Navarro in the second round. At the Swiss Open in Gstaad, Sara lost to Mandy Minella, losing her chance to get to her first semifinal in 2018. At US Open, Sara lost to Daria Gavrilova in the first round of the main draw. At Wuhan Open, she passed qualifying and lost in the first round to Viktorija Golubic. Her appearance at Wuhan was her first Premier 5 tournament. For the second year in a row, she lost to Andrea Petkovic in qualification of the China Open.

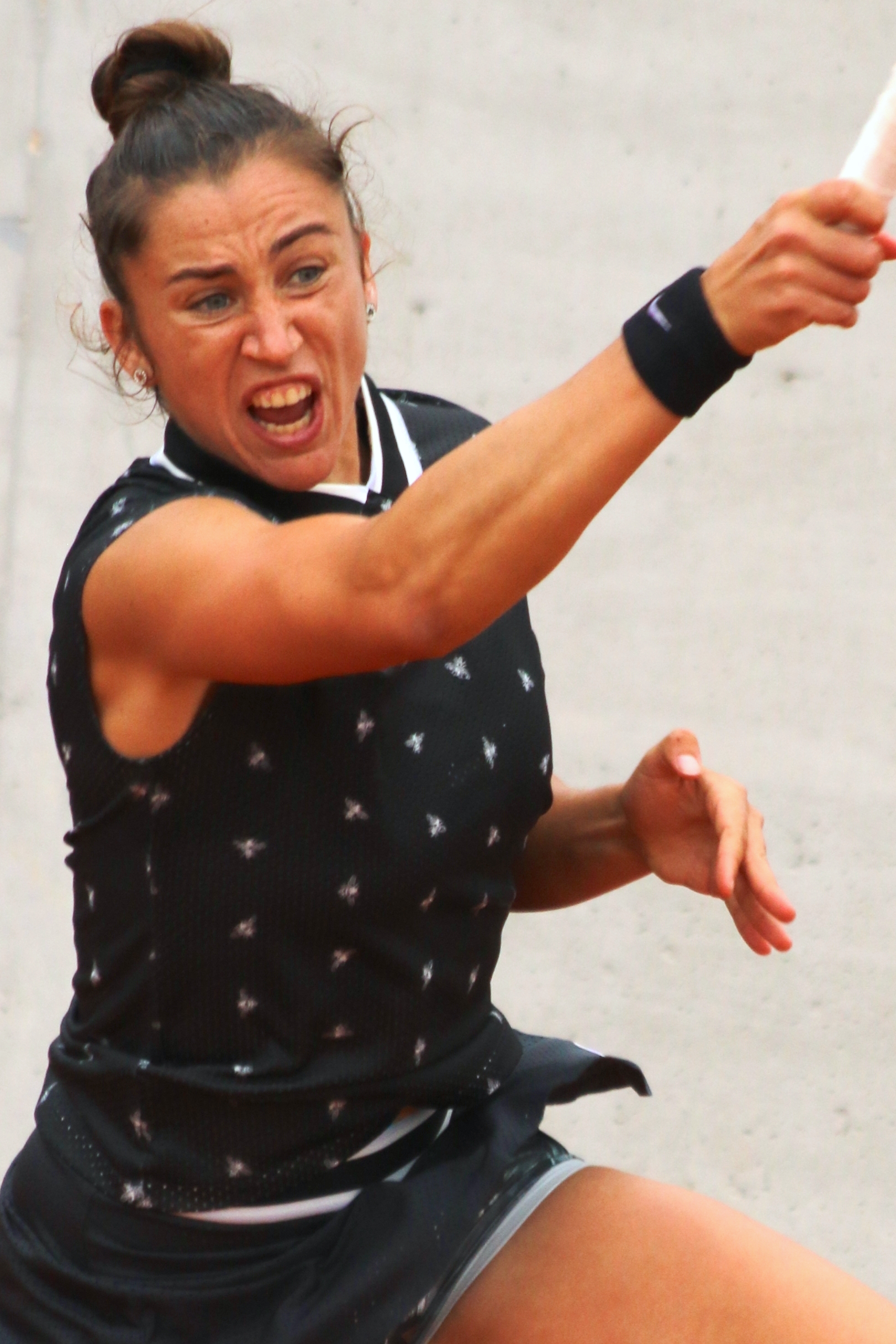
Sorribes Tormo at the 2019 French Open

Sara started the 2019 season playing in quarterfinal at ASB Classic, where on her way to the semifinal, Hsieh Su-wei stopped her. At Australian Open, she lost in first round to Anett Kontaveit. At Indian Wells Open, she lost in the second round of qualification, while in Miami she got to the second round in main draw, where she lost to Donna Vekić. In Charleston, she was eliminated in the second round by Sloane Stephens in two tie-breaks. In Bogotá, she was better than Christina McHale and Ana Bogdan in first two rounds, but then lost in the quarterfinal to Beatriz Haddad Maia. At Stuttgart Open, she won three matches in qualification and then lost in the first round in the main draw to Andrea Petkovic. At Madrid Open, she was better than her countrymate Lara Arruabarrena in the first round, but her next opponent, Naomi Osaka, was better in the second. At the Italian Open, she failed in qualification, losing in the first round to Ons Jabeur. At the Morocco Open, she also did not do well, losing in the second round to Nina Stojanović. At the French Open, she marked her first win there, winning against Alison Van Uytvanck, but in next round, Sloane Stephens defeated her.

On 10 June 2019, she reached her career-high ranking of world No. 64. In the grass-court season, she made it to the second round of the Nottingham Open, and lost in the first round of the Mallorca Open. At Wimbledon, she was forced to retire during her first-round match against former world No. 1, Caroline Wozniacki, while trailing 5–4. At the US Open, just like at Australian Open, she lost to Anett Kontaveit. During Asian tour, Sara played only two WTA tournaments. She played at the Japan Women's Open, where she reached quarterfinals, losing to Misaki Doi in straight sets. Then she headed to Guangzhou, where she was stopped in the first round by Anna Blinkova.

The first two tournaments in 2020 were not successful for Sara, losing in both of them in the first round. Then she got to the Australian Open, where she defeated Veronika Kudermetova, but just like the year before, Anett Kontaveit stopped her from going to the next round. In February, in the Fed Cup qualifying round, playing for Spain, Sara defeated Naomi Osaka 6–0, 6–3. That was her first and so far only top-10 win. At both Mexican tournaments, Mexican Open and Monterrey Open, Sara lost in the first round. After the comeback of the WTA Tour after COVID-19 pandemic outbreak, Sara played at the Palermo International, but lost to Dayana Yastremska in straight sets. In Prague, she reached the quarterfinals, winning against Barbora Strýcová and Laura Siegemund, but then lost to Irina-Camelia Begu in three-sets. At the US Open, she beat Claire Liu in the first round before 16th seed Elise Mertens knocked her out of the tournament. In Istanbul, she defeated Heather Watson but then lost to Paula Badosa in the second round. At the French Open, she faced top seed Simona Halep and lost, winning only four games, all of them in the first set.

=== 2021: First WTA Tour title and two 1000 quarterfinals, top 50 debut ===
Sorribes started the year with a quarterfinal appearance at the Abu Dhabi Open, where she lost to Marta Kostyuk, in three sets. She then had a few first-round exits, losing in the first round of the Australian Open to Daria Saville, in straight sets. In early March, Sorribes Tormo won her first WTA singles title at the Abierto Zapopan. She only lost one set on the way to her win, beating second seed Marie Bouzková, and then former world No. 5, Eugenie Bouchard, in straight sets. After that, she headed to the Monterrey Open where she made it to the semifinals losing to the eventual champion, Leylah Fernandez.

Sorribes Tormo entered the main draw of the Miami Open where she reached the quarterfinals losing to world No. 9, Bianca Andreescu, in three sets. This was Sorribes's first WTA 1000 event. On the road to the quarterfinals, she beat Australian Open runner-up Jennifer Brady, 21st seed Elena Rybakina and 27th seed Ons Jabeur. As a result, she entered the top 50 at world No. 48 on 5 April 2021.

In the first round of Wimbledon, Sorribes Tormo weathered 47 winners to beat Ana Konjuh 6–3, 3–6, 6–3, then squared off against 2018 champion Angelique Kerber in a 3-hour, 19 minute epic Kerber pulled out, 7–5, 5–7, 6–4, despite being broken seven times. The players received a standing ovation from the spectators for their efforts.

At the 2020 Tokyo Olympics, Sorribes Tormo shocked world No. 1, Ashleigh Barty, with a straight-sets win. In the second round, she defeated Fiona Ferro (6-1, 6–4), but lost in the round of 16 to Anastasia Pavlyuchenkova (1-6, 3–6).

Tormo beat 22nd seed Karolína Muchová to reach the second round of the US Open, only to be swept aside by Emma Raducanu in the third, 6–0, 6–1.

=== 2022: İstanbul Cup doubles title, Madrid singles quarterfinal ===
Partnering Marie Bouzková, Sorribes Tormo won the doubles title at the İstanbul Cup, defeating Natela Dzalamidze and Kamilla Rakhimova in the final. She reached the quarterfinals of the Madrid Open, beating Anastasia Pavlyuchenkova, Naomi Osaka and Daria Kasatkina, before losing to 12th seed Jessica Pegula.

=== 2023: 100 spots rankings drop, major fourth round, second career title, back to top 55 ===
After taking a six months hiatus since October 2022, she dropped to No. 132 on 22 May 2023, 100 positions lower than her career high ranking back in February 2022. Subsequently, she entered the French Open using protected ranking. She reached the fourth round for the first time in her career, defeating wildcard Clara Burel, Petra Martić and Elena Rybakina by walkover. She also reached the quarterfinals in doubles with Marie Bouzková after the opposite team of Kato/Sutjiadi was defaulted (see details in French Open controversy below). As a result, she moved back up by 50 positions to the top 85 in the singles rankings to No. 82, and in doubles to No. 87, on 12 June 2023.

She won her second singles title at the Tennis in Cleveland as a lucky loser. She became the sixth lucky loser in WTA history to win a singles title. It was her first title since 2021 Guadalajara.

Sorribes Tormo and Bouzkova won their first WTA 1000 China Open title defeating Giuliana Olmos and Chan Hao-Ching.

==== French Open controversy ====
At the 2023 French Open, Miyu Kato and Aldila Sutjiadi were disqualified from the tournament during their doubles match after a ball returned by Kato to a ballgirl accidentally hit the ballgirl. The incident sparked controversy and criticism of Marie Bouzková and Sara Sorribes Tormo, who argued for the disqualification. Kato hit a one-handed backhand to return the ball to the ballgirl. The ballgirl seemed unaware that the ball was coming towards her and it unintentionally struck her, causing her discomfort and tears. After a consultation with officials, Kato and Sutjiadi were defaulted. The punishment received surprise and backlash from some viewers and tennis commentators. Former player Gilles Simon criticized Bouzkova and Sorribes Tormo's actions, while some suggested they should also face consequences. The incident drew widespread attention and sparked debates about sportsmanship in tennis. Kato issued an apology, expressing remorse.

=== 2024: Olympic bronze medal, second WTA 1000 doubles title and top 20 ===
At the Madrid Open, seeded eighth in doubles, she and compatriot Cristina Bucșa won the title defeating Barbora Krejčíková and Laura Siegemund in the final, becoming the first all-Spanish doubles team to win in Madrid. This brought her to a career-high doubles ranking of No. 17, on 6 May 2024. Seeded eighth at the Paris Olympics with Bucșa, they won the women's doubles bronze medal.

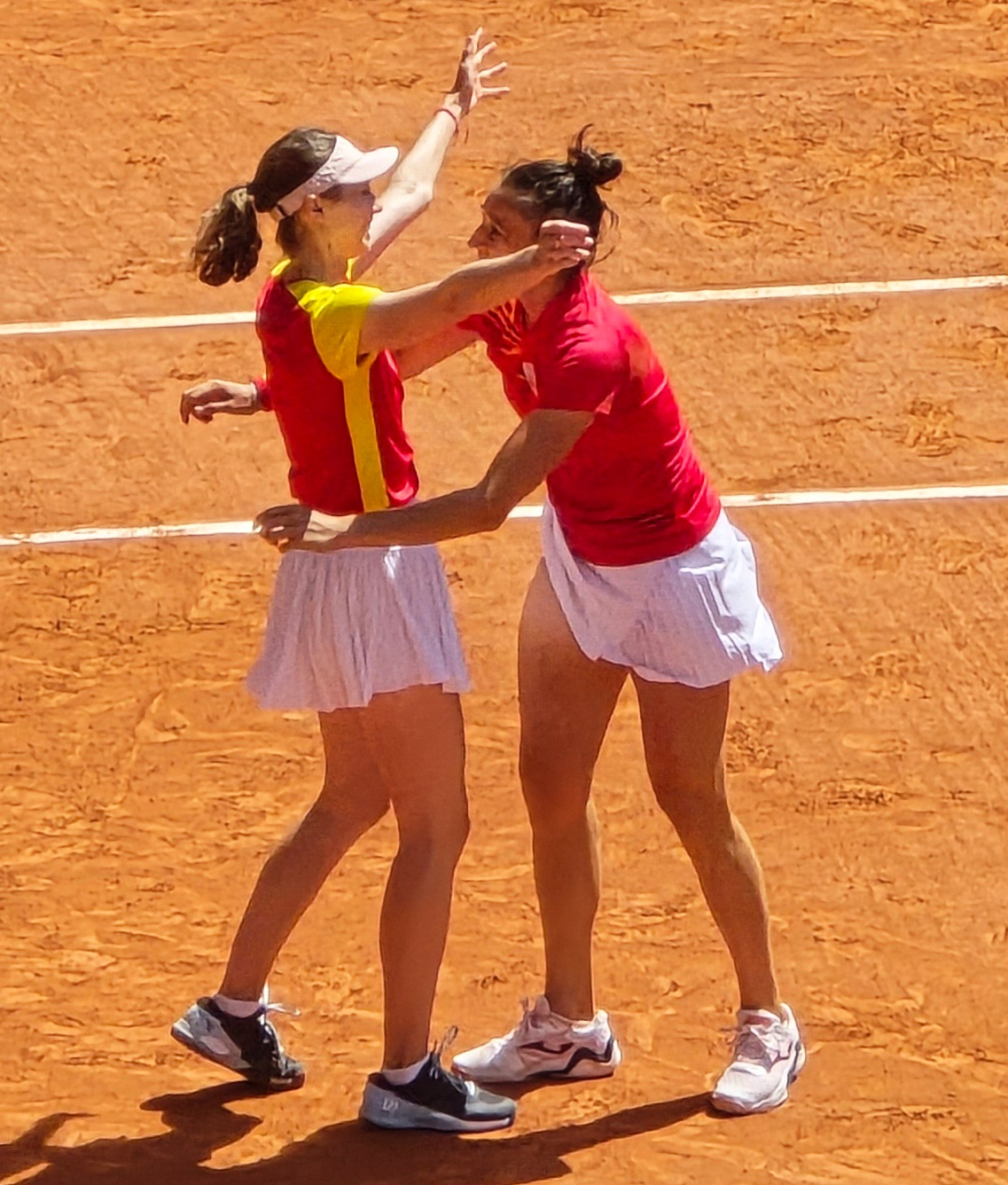
Sara Sorribes Tormo with Cristina Bucșa at the 2024 Summer Olympics

=== 2025–26: Hiatus and comeback ===
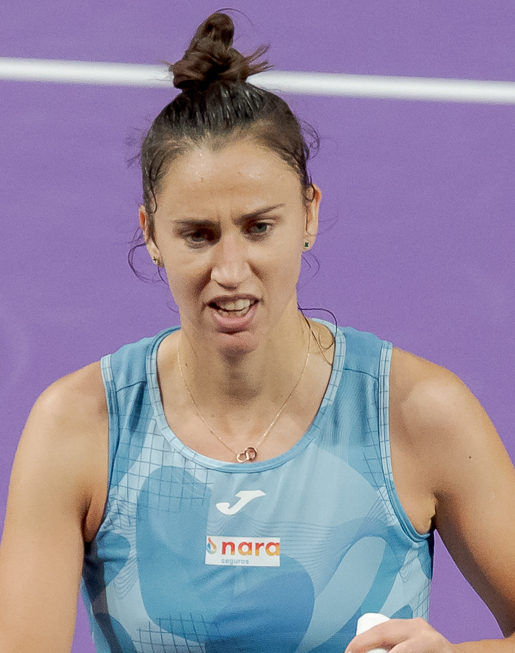
Sorribes Tormo at the 2025 Transylvania Open

In April 2025, Sorribes Tormo partnered Cristina Bucșa to win the doubles title at the Copa Colsanitas, defeating Irina Bara and Laura Pigossi in the final. Two weeks later, she announced she would be taking an indefinite break from professional tennis stating in a social media post that "I feel that I need to stop and rest. I don’t know if it will be permanent or temporary. I want to be coherent and consistent with what my body feels."

On 5 November 2025, she revealed she had undergone treatment for depression and planned to make her return to competitive tennis at the WTA 125 Copa LP Chile later that month. Partnering with María Lourdes Carlé, Sorribes Tormo won the doubles title at the event, defeating Léolia Jeanjean and Valeriya Strakhova in the final.

In February 2026, she won her seventh WTA Tour doubles title at the Transylvania Open, teaming with Kamilla Rakhimova to overcome Wang Xinyu and Zheng Saisai in the final.

== Performance timelines ==
Key
W	F	SF	QF	#R	RR	Q#	P#	DNQ	A	Z#	PO	G	S	B	NMS	NTI	P	NH

(W) winner; (F) finalist; (SF) semifinalist; (QF) quarterfinalist; (#R) rounds 4, 3, 2, 1; (RR) round-robin stage; (Q#) qualification round; (P#) preliminary round; (DNQ) did not qualify; (A) absent; (Z#) Davis/Fed Cup Zonal Group (with number indication) or (PO) play-off; (G) gold, (S) silver or (B) bronze Olympic/Paralympic medal; (NMS) not a Masters tournament; (NTI) not a Tier I tournament; (P) postponed; (NH) not held; (SR) strike rate (events won / competed); (W–L) win–loss record.
To avoid confusion and double counting, these charts are updated at the conclusion of a tournament or when the player's participation has ended.

Only main-draw results in WTA Tour, Grand Slam tournaments, Billie Jean King Cup, United Cup, Hopman Cup and Olympic Games are included in win–loss records.

=== Singles ===
Current through the 2026 Transylvania Open.

Tournament	2012	2013	2014	2015	2016	2017	2018	2019	2020	2021	2022	2023	2024	2025	2026	SR	W–L	Win %
Grand Slam tournaments
Australian Open	A	A	A	A	Q2	1R	A	1R	2R	1R	2R	A	1R	Q2	A	0 / 6	2–6	25%
French Open	A	A	A	Q1	1R	1R	Q2	2R	1R	1R	A	4R	1R	A	1R	0 / 8	3–8	27%
Wimbledon	A	A	A	Q2	Q1	1R	2R	1R	NH	2R	2R	2R	1R	A	2R	0 / 8	5–8	38%
US Open	A	A	A	A	Q3	1R	1R	1R	2R	3R	1R	2R	2R	A		0 / 8	5–8	38%
Win–loss	0–0	0–0	0–0	0–0	0–1	0–4	1–2	1–4	2–3	3–4	2–3	4–3	1–4	0–0	1–2	0 / 30	15–30	33%
National representation
Summer Olympics	A	NH			A	NH				3R	NH		1R	NH		0 / 2	2–2	50%
Billie Jean King Cup (Note: Formerly known as Fed Cup until 2020.)	A	A	A	WG2	PO	1R	A	PO	RR		RR	RR	1R			0 / 5	7–6	54%
WTA 1000
Dubai / Qatar Open (Note: The first Premier 5 event of the year has switched back and forth between the Dubai Tennis Championships and the Qatar Ladies Open since 2009. Dubai was classified as a Premier 5 event from 2009 to 2011 before being succeeded by Doha for the 2012–2014 period. In 2015, Dubai regained its Premier 5 status while Doha was demoted to Premier status. The Premier 5 tournaments were reclassified as WTA 1000 tournaments in 2021.)	A	A	A	A	A	A	Q2	A	A	A	A	A	A		A	0 / 0	0–0	–
Indian Wells Open	A	A	A	A	A	2R	1R	Q2	NH	2R	3R	A	1R	2R	A	0 / 6	3–6	33%
Miami Open	A	A	A	A	A	Q2	Q1	2R	NH	QF	2R	A	1R	2R	A	0 / 5	6–5	55%
Madrid Open	Q1	Q2	Q1	Q1	1R	1R	2R	2R	NH	1R	QF	Q1	4R	A	1R	0 / 8	8–8	50%
Italian Open	A	A	A	A	A	Q2	A	Q1	A	2R	1R	A	3R	A	A	0 / 3	3–3	50%
Canadian Open	A	A	A	A	A	A	A	A	NH	QF	2R	A	A	A	A	0 / 2	4–2	67%
Cincinnati Open	A	A	A	A	A	Q1	A	A	A	A	1R	Q1	A	A	A	0 / 1	0–1	0%
Guadalajara Open	NH										A	A	NMS			0 / 0	0–0	–
Pan Pacific / Wuhan Open (Note: In 2014, the Pan Pacific Open was downgraded to a Premier event and replaced by the Wuhan Open. The Premier 5 tournaments were reclassified as WTA 1000 tournaments in 2021.)	A	A	A	A	A	A	1R	A	NH				A	A		0 / 1	0–1	0%
China Open	A	A	A	A	A	Q2	Q2	A	NH			1R	2R	A		0 / 2	1–2	33%
Win–loss	0–0	0–0	0–0	0–0	0–1	1–2	1–3	2–2	0–0	8–5	5–6	0–1	5–4			0 / 24	22–24	48%
Career statistics
	2012	2013	2014	2015	2016	2017	2018	2019	2020	2021	2022	2023	2024	2025	2026	SR	W–L	Win %
Tournaments	0	0	0	3	9	17	13	18	12	21	18	10				Career total: 121		
Titles	0	0	0	0	0	0	0	0	0	1	0	1	0			Career total: 2		
Finals	0	0	0	0	0	0	0	0	0	1	0	1	0			Career total: 2		
Hard win–loss	0–0	0–0	0–0	0–0	3–3	8–10	1–8	5–8	4–8	26–13	9–10	10–5				2 / 65	66–65	50%
Clay win–loss	0–0	0–0	0–0	3–3	2–5	7–7	5–4	6–8	4–4	2–5	13–6	9–4				0 / 44	51–46	53%
Grass win–loss	0–0	0–0	0–0	0–0	1–1	0–2	1–1	1–3	NH	3–2	2–2	1–1				0 / 12	9–12	43%
Overall win–loss	0–0	0–0	0–0	3–3	6–9	15–19	7–13	12–19	8–12	31–20	24–18	20–10				2 / 121	126–123	51%
Year-end ranking (Note: 2011: WTA Ranking–1061.)	509	329	276	164	107	99	87	82	66	36	66	50	106	328		$4,327,502		

=== Doubles ===
Current through the 2026 Transylvania Open.

Tournament	2016	2017	2018	2019	2020	2021	2022	2023	2024	SR	W–L	Win%
Grand Slam tournaments
Australian Open	A	A	A	A	2R	1R	QF	A	1R	0 / 4	4–4	50%
French Open	A	A	3R	2R	A	1R	A	QF	2R	0 / 5	7–5	58%
Wimbledon	A	A	1R	A	NH	2R	3R	SF	2R	0 / 5	8–5	62%
US Open	A	3R	1R	3R	1R	A	QF	1R	3R	0 / 7	8–7	53%
Win–loss	0–0	2–1	2–3	2–2	1–2	1–3	8–3	7–3	4–4	0 / 21	27–21	56%
National representation
Summer Olympics	A	NH				2R	NH		B	0 / 2	5–2	71%
WTA 1000
Qatar Open	A	A	A	A	A	A	A	A	A	0 / 0	0–0	–
Dubai	A	A	A	A	A	A	A	A	A	0 / 0	0–0	–
Indian Wells Open	A	A	A	A	NH	1R	A	A	2R	0 / 2	1–2	33%
Miami Open	A	A	A	A	NH	A	QF	A	A	0 / 1	2–1	67%
Madrid Open	1R	2R	1R	2R	NH	1R	2R	A	W	1 / 7	8–6	57%
Italian Open	A	A	A	1R	A	A	1R	A	A	0 / 2	0–2	0%
Canadian Open	A	A	A	A	NH	1R	1R	A	A	0 / 2	0–2	0%
Cincinnati Open	A	A	A	A	A	QF	1R	2R	A	0 / 3	2–3	40%
Guadalajara Open	NMS/NH						A	A	NMS	0 / 0	0–0	–
Wuhan Open	A	A	A	A	NH				A	0 / 0	0–0	–
China Open	A	A	A	A	NH			W	A	1 / 1	5–0	100%
Career statistics
Tournaments	3	6	9	13	7	14	13	5		Career total: 70		
Titles	0	0	1	1	0	0	1	1	1	Career total: 4		
Finals	0	0	1	2	0	0	1	1	1	Career total: 5		
Overall win-loss	3–3	5–6	14–8	15–12	4–7	8–14	18–12	13-4		4 / 65	80–66	55%
Year-end ranking	267	152	84	63	52	103	38	33	46			

== Significant finals ==
=== WTA 1000 tournaments ===
==== Doubles: 2 (2 titles) ====
Result	Year	Tournament	Surface	Partner	Opponents	Score
Win	2023	China Open	Hard	(Czech Republic) Marie Bouzková	(Chinese Taipei) Chan Hao-ching (Mexico) Giuliana Olmos	3–6, 6–0, [10–4]
Win	2024	Madrid Open	Clay	(Spain) Cristina Bucșa	(Czech Republic) Barbora Krejčíková (Germany) Laura Siegemund	6–0, 6–2

=== Olympic medal matches ===
==== Doubles: 1 (bronze medal) ====
Result	Year	Tournament	Surface	Partner	Opponents	Score
Bronze	2024	Paris Summer Olympics	Clay	(Spain) Cristina Bucșa	(Czech Republic) Karolína Muchová (Czech Republic) Linda Nosková	6–2, 6–2

== WTA Tour finals ==
=== Singles: 2 (2 titles) ===
Legend WTA 250 (2–0)	Finals by surface Hard (2–0)	Finals by setting Outdoor (2–0)

Result	W-L	Date	Tournament	Tier	Surface	Opponent	Score
Win	1–0	Mar 2021	Abierto Zapopan, Mexico	WTA 250	Hard	(Canada) Eugenie Bouchard	6–2, 7–5
Win	2–0	Aug 2023	Tennis in Cleveland, US	WTA 250	Hard	Ekaterina Alexandrova	3–6, 6–4, 6–4

=== Doubles: 8 (7 titles, 1 runner-up) ===
Legend WTA 1000 (2–0) WTA 500 (0–0) WTA 250 (Note: The WTA International tournaments were reclassified as WTA 250 tournaments in 2021.) (5–1)	Finals by surface Hard (3–0) Clay (4–0) Grass (0–1)	Finals by setting Outdoor (6–1) Indoor (1–0)

Result	W–L	Date	Tournament	Tier	Surface	Partner	Opponents	Score
Win	1–0	Apr 2018	Monterrey Open, Mexico	International	Hard	(United Kingdom) Naomi Broady	(United States) Desirae Krawczyk (Mexico) Giuliana Olmos	3–6, 6–4, [10–8]
Win	2–0	May 2019	Rabat Grand Prix, Morocco	International	Clay	(Spain) María José; Martínez Sánchez	(Spain) Georgina García Pérez (Georgia (country)) Oksana Kalashnikova	7–5, 6–1
Loss	2–1	Jun 2019	Mallorca Open, Spain	International	Grass	(Spain) María José; Martínez Sánchez	(Belgium) Kirsten Flipkens (Sweden) Johanna Larsson	2–6, 4–6
Win	3–1	Apr 2022	İstanbul Cup, Turkey	WTA 250	Clay	(Czech Republic) Marie Bouzková	Natela Dzalamidze; Kamilla Rakhimova	6–3, 6–4
Win	4–1	Oct 2023	China Open, China	WTA 1000	Hard	(Czech Republic) Marie Bouzková	(Mexico) Giuliana Olmos (Chinese Taipei) Chan Hao-ching	3–6, 6–0, [10–4]
Win	5–1	May 2024	Madrid Open, Spain	WTA 1000	Clay	(Spain) Cristina Bucșa	(Czech Republic) Barbora Krejčíková (Germany) Laura Siegemund	6–0, 6–2
Win	6–1	Mar 2025	Copa Colsanitas, Colombia	WTA 250	Clay	(Spain) Cristina Bucșa	(Romania) Irina Bara (Brazil) Laura Pigossi	5–7, 6–2, [10–5]
Win	7–1	Feb 2026	Transylvania Open, Romania	WTA 250	Hard (i)	(Uzbekistan) Kamilla Rakhimova	(China) Zheng Saisai (China) Wang Xinyu	7–6^{(9–7)}, 6–3

== WTA 125 finals ==
=== Singles: 1 (runner-up) ===
Result	Date	Tournament	Surface	Opponent	Score
Loss	Jun 2019	Bol Ladies Open, Croatia	Clay	(Slovenia) Tamara Zidanšek	5–7, 5–7

=== Doubles: 2 (2 titles) ===
Result	W–L	Date	Tournament	Surface	Partner	Opponents	Score
Win	1–0	Dec 2019	Open de Limoges, France	Hard (i)	(Spain) Georgina García Pérez	(Russia) Ekaterina Alexandrova (Georgia (country)) Oksana Kalashnikova	6–2, 7–6^{(7–3)}
Win	2–0	Nov 2025	Colina Challenger, Chile	Clay	(Argentina) María Lourdes Carlé	(France) Léolia Jeanjean (Ukraine) Valeriya Strakhova	6–2, 6–4

== ITF Circuit finals ==
=== Singles: 21 (11 titles, 10 runner-ups) ===
Legend $100,000 tournaments (0–5) $80,000 tournaments (1–0) $50,000 tournaments (2–0) $25,000 tournaments (4–3) $10,000 tournaments (4–2)	Finals by surface Hard (1–2) Clay (10–7) Grass (0–1)

Result	W–L	Date	Tournament	Tier	Surface	Opponent	Score
Loss	0–1	Mar 2012	ITF Madrid, Spain	10,000	Clay	(France) Estelle Guisard	0–6, 6–7^{(5)}
Win	1–1	Mar 2012	ITF Madrid, Spain	10,000	Clay	(Spain) Isabel Rapisarda Calvo	6–2, 7–6^{(8)}
Win	2–1	Aug 2012	ITF Locri, Italy	10,000	Clay	(Italy) Anastasia Grymalska	6–3, 7–5
Win	3–1	Aug 2012	ITF Todi, Italy	10,000	Clay	(Spain) Rocío de la Torre Sánchez	4–6, 6–1, 6–3
Win	4–1	Nov 2012	ITF La Vall d'Uixó, Spain	10,000	Clay	(Spain) Olga Sáez Larra	6–1, 6–1
Loss	4–2	Apr 2013	Nana Trophy Tunis, Tunisia	25,000	Clay	(Tunisia) Ons Jabeur	3–6, 2–6
Loss	4–3	Apr 2014	ITF Pula, Italy	10,000	Clay	(Romania) Andreea Mitu	4–6, 3–6
Win	5–3	Aug 2014	ITF Westende, Belgium	25,000	Hard	(Belgium) Ysaline Bonaventure	6–2, 6–0
Loss	5–4	Feb 2015	ITF Sunrise, United States	25,000	Clay	(United States) Sachia Vickery	2–6, 6–2, 3–6
Win	6–4	Feb 2016	ITF São Paulo, Brazil	25,000	Clay	(Romania) Andreea Mitu	7–5, 6–1
Win	7–4	Jun 2016	Bredeney Ladies Open, Germany	50,000	Clay	(Czech Republic) Karolína Muchová	7–6^{(5)}, 6–4
Loss	7–5	Oct 2016	Soho Square Tournament, Egypt	100,000	Hard	(Croatia) Donna Vekić	2–6, 7–6^{(7)}, 3–6
Loss	7–6	May 2018	Internacional de Solgironès, Spain	25,000	Clay	(Liechtenstein) Kathinka von Deichmann	3–6, 6–3, 3–6
Loss	7–7	Jun 2018	Manchester Trophy, UK	100,000	Grass	(Tunisia) Ons Jabeur	2–6, 1–6
Loss	7–8	Jul 2018	Contrexéville Open, France	100,000	Clay	(Switzerland) Stefanie Vögele	4–6, 2–6
Win	8–8	Oct 2018	ITF Pula, Italy	25,000	Clay	(Russia) Amina Anshba	6–4, 6–3
Win	9–8	Aug 2019	ITF Bad Saulgau, Germany	W25	Clay	(Germany) Katharina Gerlach	7–6^{(4)}, 6–1
Loss	9–9	Aug 2019	Vancouver Open, Canada	W100	Hard	(United Kingdom) Heather Watson	5–7, 4–6
Win	10–9	Sep 2020	Open de Cagnes-sur-Mer, France	W80	Clay	(Romania) Irina Bara	6–3, 6–4
Loss	10–10	May 2023	Open Villa de Madrid, Spain	W100	Clay	(Serbia) Olga Danilović	2–6, 3–6
Win	11–10	Apr 2026	ITF Portorož, Slovenia	W75	Clay	(Spain) Leyre Romero Gormaz	6–4, 6–1

=== Doubles: 7 (5 titles, 2 runner-ups) ===
Legend $100,000 tournaments (0–1) $75,000 tournaments (0–1) $25,000 tournaments (3–0) $10,000 tournaments (2–0)	Finals by surface Hard (0–1) Clay (5–1)

Result	W–L	Date	Tournament	Tier	Surface	Partner	Opponents	Score
Win	1–0	Aug 2012	ITF Locri, Italy	10,000	Clay	(Greece) Despina Papamichail	(Japan) Kana Daniel (Belarus) Nastassia Rubel	6–1, 6–0
Win	2–0	Aug 2012	ITF Todi, Italy	10,000	Clay	(Belarus) Nastassia Rubel	(Italy) Alessia Camplone (Italy) Sara Sussarello	6–1, 6–0
Win	3–0	Jun 2014	Open de Montpellier, France	25,000	Clay	(Spain) Inés Ferrer Suárez	(Chinese Taipei) Hsu Chieh-yu (Bulgaria) Elitsa Kostova	2–6, 6–3, [12–10]
Win	4–0	Jun 2014	ITF Périgueux, France	25,000	Clay	(Venezuela) Andrea Gámiz	(Brazil) Gabriela Cé (Argentina) Florencia Molinero	5–7, 6–4, [10–8]
Loss	4–1	Jul 2016	Prague Open, Czech Republic	75,000	Clay	(Spain) Sílvia Soler Espinosa	(Netherlands) Demi Schuurs (Czech Republic) Renata Voráčová	5–7, 6–3, [4–10]
Win	5–1	Aug 2019	ITF Bad Saulgau, Germany	25,000	Clay	(Spain) Georgina García Pérez	(Russia) Ksenia Laskutova (Russia) Marina Melnikova	6–3, 6–1
Loss	5–2	Dec 2019	Dubai Tennis Challenge, UAE	100,000+H	Hard	(Spain) Georgina García Pérez	(Czech Republic) Lucie Hradecká (Slovenia) Andreja Klepač	5–7, 6–3, [8–10]

== Head-to-head records ==
=== No. 1 wins ===
No.	Player	Event	Surface	Rd	Score	Result
1.	(Australia) Ashleigh Barty	2020 Tokyo Olympics	Hard	1R	6–4, 6–3	3R

=== Wins against top 10 players ===
- Sorribes Tormo's match record against players who were, at the time the match was played, ranked in the top 10.

Season	2020	2021	Total
Wins	1	1	2

#	Opponent	Rank	Event	Surface	Rd	Score	SSTR
2020
1.	(Japan) Naomi Osaka	No. 10	Fed Cup, Spain	Clay	QR	6–0, 6–3	No. 78
2021
2.	(Australia) Ashleigh Barty	No. 1	Tokyo Olympics	Hard	1R	6–4, 6–3	No. 48

=== Double-bagel matches ===
Result	W–L	Year	Tournament	Tier	Surface	Opponent	Rank	Rd	SSTR
Loss	0–1	2011	ITF Madrid, Spain	10,000	Clay	(Spain) Estrella Cabeza Candela (1)	No. 268	SF	N/A
Win	1–1	2011	ITF Madrid, Spain	10,000	Clay	(Romania) Adina-Alexandra Marinescu	N/A	1R	N/A
Loss	1–2	2011	ITF Vinaròs, Spain	10,000	Clay	(Spain) María Teresa Torró Flor	No. 458	2R	No. 1065
Win	2–2	2012	ITF Rabat, Morocco	25,000	Clay	(Russia) Viktoriya Bogoslovskaya	N/A	QR1	No. 1041
Win	3–2	2012	ITF Tunis, Tunisia	25,000	Clay	(Tunisia) Imen Abid	N/A	QR1	No. 756
Win	4–2	2013	ITF La Marsa, Tunisia	25,000	Clay	(Switzerland) Cyrine Ben Cheikh	N/A	QR1	No. 538
Win	5–2	2014	ITF Campinas, Brazil	25,000	Clay	(Brazil) Rafaela Sancisquiny	N/A	QR1	No. 329
Win	6–2	2014	ITF Campinas, Brazil	25,000	Clay	(Brazil) Suellen Abel	No. 843	QR2	No. 329
Win	7–2	2014	Grado Tennis Cup, Italy	25,000	Clay	(Italy) Paola Cigui	N/A	QR1	No. 456
Win	8–2	2014	ITF Westende Middelkerke, Belgium	25,000	Hard	(France) Miryam Jabri	N/A	QR1	No. 422
Win	9–2	2015	ITF Sunrise, United States	25,000	Clay	(Russia) Daria Kasatkina	No. 350	SF	No. 248
Loss	9–3	2018	Budapest Open, Hungary	International	Hard (i)	(Belgium) Ysaline Bonaventure	No. 154	1R	No. 108
Loss	9–4	2018	US Open, United States	Grand Slam	Hard	(Australia) Daria Gavrilova (25)	No. 32	1R	No. 88
Win	10–4	2023	BJK Cup, Spain	Team	Clay	(Mexico) Fernanda Contreras Gómez	No. 191	QR	No. 101

== Junior Grand Slam tournament finals ==
=== Doubles: 1 (runner-up) ===
Result	Year	Tournament	Surface	Partner	Opponents	Score
Loss	2013	US Open	Hard	(Switzerland) Belinda Bencic	(Czech Republic) Barbora Krejčíková (Czech Republic) Kateřina Siniaková	3–6, 4–6
