= 2022 Transylvania Open =

- Date: 10–16 October
- Edition: 2nd
- Category: WTA 250
- Draw: 32S / 16Q / 16D
- Prize money: $251,750
- Surface: Hard (Indoor)
- Location: Cluj-Napoca, Romania
- Venue: BT Arena

Champions

Singles
- Anna Blinkova

Doubles
- (Belgium) Kirsten Flipkens / (Germany) Laura Siegemund
← 2021 ·	Transylvania Open	· 2023 →

The 2022 Transylvania Open was a women's tennis tournament played on indoor hard courts. It was the second edition of the Transylvania Open, and part of the WTA 250 series of the 2022 WTA Tour. It was held at the BT Arena in Cluj-Napoca, Romania, from 10 until 16 October 2022.

The event is one of the six tournaments that were given single-year WTA 250 licenses in September and October 2022 due to the cancellation of tournaments in China during the 2022 season because of the ongoing COVID-19 pandemic, as well as the suspension of tournaments in China following former WTA player Peng Shuai's allegation of sexual assault against a Chinese government official.

== Champions ==
=== Singles ===
- Anna Blinkova def. (Italy) Jasmine Paolini 6–2, 3–6, 6–2

This is Blinkova's first career singles title.

=== Doubles ===
- (Belgium) Kirsten Flipkens / (Germany) Laura Siegemund def. Kamilla Rakhimova / Yana Sizikova 6–3, 7–5

== Singles main draw entrants ==
=== Seeds ===
Country	Player	Rank^{1}	Seed
~~CZE~~	~~Barbora Krejčíková~~	~~23~~	~~1~~
UKR	Anhelina Kalinina	45	2
ROU	Ana Bogdan	46	3
	Anastasia Potapova	51	4
POL	Magda Linette	55	5
UKR	Marta Kostyuk	56	6
CHN	Wang Xiyu	59	7
HUN	Anna Bondár	61	8
ITA	Lucia Bronzetti	62	9

- Rankings are as of October 3, 2022.

=== Other entrants ===
The following players received wildcards into the main draw:

- (Romania) Irina Bara
- (Canada) Eugenie Bouchard
- (Romania) Elena-Gabriela Ruse

The following players received entry using a protected ranking:

- ~~(Germany) Laura Siegemund~~

The following players received entry from the qualifying draw:

- Elina Avanesyan
- Anna Blinkova
- (Belgium) Ysaline Bonaventure
- (Serbia) Olga Danilović
- Kamilla Rakhimova
- Anastasia Zakharova

The following players received entry as lucky losers:

- (France) Océane Dodin
- (Germany) Tamara Korpatsch
- (France) Harmony Tan

=== Withdrawals ===
Before the tournament

- (Romania) Irina-Camelia Begu → replaced by (United Kingdom) Harriet Dart
- (Slovenia) Kaja Juvan → replaced by (Ukraine) Dayana Yastremska
- (Czech Republic) Barbora Krejčíková → replaced by (France) Océane Dodin
- (Serbia) Aleksandra Krunić → replaced by (Hungary) Dalma Gálfi
- (Czech Republic) Tereza Martincová → replaced by (Germany) Tamara Korpatsch
- (Egypt) Mayar Sherif → replaced by (China) Wang Xinyu
- (Germany) Laura Siegemund → replaced by (France) Harmony Tan
- (Spain) Sara Sorribes Tormo → replaced by Varvara Gracheva

== Doubles main draw entrants ==
=== Seeds ===
Country	Player	Country	Player	Rank^{1}	Seed
BEL	Kirsten Flipkens	GER	Laura Siegemund	76	1
NOR	Ulrikke Eikeri	SVK	Tereza Mihalíková	96	2
GEO	Natela Dzalamidze		Alexandra Panova	104	3
GEO	Oksana Kalashnikova	UKR	Marta Kostyuk	116	4

- Rankings are as of October 3, 2022.

=== Other entrants ===
The following pairs received wildcards into the doubles main draw:

- (Hungary) Tímea Babos / (United States) Ingrid Neel
- (Romania) Jaqueline Cristian / (Romania) Elena-Gabriela Ruse

=== Withdrawals ===
Before the tournament

- (Belgium) Kirsten Flipkens / (Spain) Sara Sorribes Tormo → replaced by (Belgium) Kirsten Flipkens / (Germany) Laura Siegemund
- (Germany) Anna-Lena Friedsam / (Romania) Monica Niculescu → replaced by (United Kingdom) Harriet Dart / (Romania) Monica Niculescu
- (Ukraine) Marta Kostyuk / (Czech Republic) Tereza Martincová → replaced by (Georgia (country)) Oksana Kalashnikova / (Ukraine) Marta Kostyuk
- (Serbia) Aleksandra Krunić / (Poland) Katarzyna Piter → replaced by (Switzerland) Viktorija Golubic / (China) Han Xinyun
