= 2023 Transylvania Open – Doubles =

Doubles
- 2023 Transylvania Open

Final
- Champions: (United Kingdom) Jodie Burrage (Switzerland) Jil Teichmann
- Runners-up: (France) Léolia Jeanjean (Ukraine) Valeriya Strakhova
- Score: 6–1, 6–4

Events
Singles	Doubles
← 2022 ·	Transylvania Open	· 2024 →

Jodie Burrage and Jil Teichmann defeated Léolia Jeanjean and Valeriya Strakhova in the final, 6–1, 6–4 to win the doubles tennis title at the 2023 Transylvania Open.

Kirsten Flipkens and Laura Siegemund were the reigning champions, but Flipkens retired from professional tennis in July 2023 and Siegemund chose to compete in Nanchang instead.

== Seeds ==
1. (United States) Alycia Parks / (Romania) Elena-Gabriela Ruse (quarterfinals)
2. (Hungary) Anna Bondár / (Belgium) Kimberley Zimmermann (quarterfinals)
3. (Belgium) Greet Minnen / (Belgium) Yanina Wickmayer (quarterfinals)
4. (Germany) Anna-Lena Friedsam / (Romania) Monica Niculescu (semifinals)

== Draw ==
=== Key ===
- Q = Qualifier
- WC = Wild card
- LL = Lucky loser
- Alt = Alternate
- SE = Special exempt
- PR = Protected ranking
- ITF = ITF entry
- JE = Junior exempt
- w/o = Walkover
- r = Retired
- d = Defaulted
- SR = Special ranking

=== Draw ===
First round
1	(United States) A Parks (Romania) E-G Ruse	6	6
WC	(Romania) I Amariei (Romania) B Szabó	1	2
(Germany) V Heisen (India) A Raina	6^{4}	6	[9]
(United Kingdom) J Burrage (Switzerland) J Teichmann	7^{7}	4	[11]
3	(Belgium) G Minnen (Belgium) Y Wickmayer	6^{4}	6	[10]
(United Kingdom) A Barnett (United Kingdom) O Nicholls	7^{7}	2	[8]
(United Kingdom) M Lumsden (France) J Ponchet	6	6^{1}	[5]
(Slovenia) D Jakupović; I Khromacheva	4	7^{7}	[10]
WC	(Romania) M Gae (Bulgaria) V Tomova	7^{7}	6^{5}	[4]
(Romania) I Bara (Romania) J Cristian	6^{3}	7^{7}	[10]
(United Kingdom) A Collins (Venezuela) A Gámiz	2	6	[5]
4	(Germany) A-L Friedsam (Romania) M Niculescu	6	3	[10]
(Greece) V Grammatikopoulou (France) E Lechemia	2	2
(France) L Jeanjean (Ukraine) V Strakhova	6	6
Alt	(Romania) IG Ghioroaie (Romania) PM Țig	4	5
2	(Hungary) A Bondár (Belgium) K Zimmermann	6	7

Quarterfinals
1	(United States) A Parks (Romania) E-G Ruse	3	4
(United Kingdom) J Burrage (Switzerland) J Teichmann	6	6
3	(Belgium) G Minnen (Belgium) Y Wickmayer	1	2
(Slovenia) D Jakupović; I Khromacheva	6	6
(Romania) I Bara (Romania) J Cristian	4	1
4	(Germany) A-L Friedsam (Romania) M Niculescu	6	6
(France) L Jeanjean (Ukraine) V Strakhova	7^{7}	7
2	(Hungary) A Bondár (Belgium) K Zimmermann	6^{1}	5

Semifinals
(United Kingdom) J Burrage (Switzerland) J Teichmann	6	5	[10]
(Slovenia) D Jakupović; I Khromacheva	3	7	[4]
4	(Germany) A-L Friedsam (Romania) M Niculescu	6	6^{6}	[9]
(France) L Jeanjean (Ukraine) V Strakhova	2	7^{8}	[11]

Final
(United Kingdom) J Burrage (Switzerland) J Teichmann	6	6
(France) L Jeanjean (Ukraine) V Strakhova	1	4
