= 2023 Transylvania Open – Singles =

Singles
- 2023 Transylvania Open

Final
- Champion: (Germany) Tamara Korpatsch
- Runner-up: (Romania) Elena-Gabriela Ruse
- Score: 6–3, 6–4

Details
- Draw: 32 (3 WC, 4Q)
- Seeds: 8

Events
Singles	Doubles
← 2022 ·	Transylvania Open	· 2024 →

Tamara Korpatsch defeated Elena-Gabriela Ruse in the final, 6–3, 6–4 to win the singles tennis title at the 2023 Transylvania Open. It was her first WTA Tour title.

Anna Blinkova was the reigning champion, but chose to compete in Nanchang instead.

== Seeds ==
1. (Romania) Sorana Cîrstea (first round)
2. (United States) Alycia Parks (first round)
3. (Belgium) Greet Minnen (first round)
4. (Spain) Rebeka Masarova (semifinals)
5. (Romania) Ana Bogdan (quarterfinals)
6. (Belgium) Yanina Wickmayer (first round)
7. (Ukraine) Kateryna Baindl (first round)
8. (United Kingdom) Jodie Burrage (second round)

== Draw ==
=== Key ===
- Q = Qualifier
- WC = Wild card
- LL = Lucky loser
- Alt = Alternate
- SE = Special exempt
- PR = Protected ranking
- ITF = ITF entry
- JE = Junior exempt
- w/o = Walkover
- r = Retired
- d = Defaulted
- SR = Special ranking

=== Finals ===
Semifinals
(Germany) Eva Lys	4	3
(Germany) Tamara Korpatsch	6	6
4	(Spain) Rebeka Masarova	1	4
WC	(Romania) Elena-Gabriela Ruse	6	6

Final
(Germany) Tamara Korpatsch	6	6
WC	(Romania) Elena-Gabriela Ruse	3	4

=== Top half ===
First round
1	(Romania) S Cîrstea	3	3
(Germany) E Lys	6	6
(Switzerland) C Naef	4	4
(Romania) J Cristian	6	6
PR	(Romania) PM Țig	6	6^{5}	6
Q	(Greece) M Matoula	4	7^{7}	3
Q	E Makarova	6	1	6
7	(Ukraine) K Baindl	3	6	1
3	(Belgium) G Minnen	3	2
(Ukraine) D Snigur	6	6
(Germany) A-L Friedsam	6	6
Q	(Romania) IG Ghioroaie	1	1
(France) L Jeanjean	4	6	3
(Germany) T Korpatsch	6	2	6
(India) A Raina	0	2
8	(United Kingdom) J Burrage	6	6

Second round
(Germany) E Lys	2	7	6
(Romania) J Cristian	6	5	2
PR	(Romania) PM Țig	2	6	3
Q	E Makarova	6	2	6
(Ukraine) D Snigur	6	1	6
(Germany) A-L Friedsam	0	6	4
(Germany) T Korpatsch	2	6	7^{7}
8	(United Kingdom) J Burrage	6	2	6^{5}

Quarterfinals
(Germany) E Lys	6	6
Q	E Makarova	2	2
(Ukraine) D Snigur	6	2	4
(Germany) T Korpatsch	3	6	6

Semifinals
(Germany) E Lys	4	3
(Germany) T Korpatsch	6	6

=== Bottom half ===
First round
5	(Romania) A Bogdan	6	6
(Bulgaria) V Tomova	4	1
WC	(Czech Republic) N Bartůňková	7	6
(Ukraine) D Yastremska	5	4
WC	(Romania) M Bulgaru	7	6
LL	(Turkey) İ Öz	5	3
(Germany) N Noha Akugue	4	0
4	(Spain) R Masarova	6	6
6	(Belgium) Y Wickmayer	4	6^{6}
(Switzerland) J Teichmann	6	7^{8}
(Colombia) E Arango	6	7^{7}
(France) J Ponchet	3	6^{4}
(Hungary) A Bondár	5	6	6
Q	(Ukraine) A Soboleva	7	2	3
WC	(Romania) E-G Ruse	6	1	6
2	(United States) A Parks	2	6	4

Second round
5	(Romania) A Bogdan	4	7^{7}	7
WC	(Czech Republic) N Bartůňková	6	6^{5}	5
WC	(Romania) M Bulgaru	6	6^{8}	0
4	(Spain) R Masarova	3	7^{10}	6
(Switzerland) J Teichmann	3	3
(Colombia) E Arango	6	6
(Hungary) A Bondár	6^{4}	2
WC	(Romania) E-G Ruse	7^{7}	6

Quarterfinals
5	(Romania) A Bogdan	6	6^{4}	3
4	(Spain) R Masarova	3	7^{7}	6
(Colombia) E Arango	1	6	1
WC	(Romania) E-G Ruse	6	0	6

Semifinals
4	(Spain) R Masarova	1	4
WC	(Romania) E-G Ruse	6	6

== Qualifying ==
=== Seeds ===
1. (India) Ankita Raina (moved to main draw)
2. (Turkey) İpek Öz (qualifying competition, lucky loser)
3. Ekaterina Makarova (qualified)
4. (Slovenia) Dalila Jakupović (first round)
5. (Greece) Valentini Grammatikopoulou (first round)
6. (Ukraine) Valeriya Strakhova (qualifying competition)
7. (Greece) Martha Matoula (qualified)
8. (Ukraine) Anastasiya Soboleva (qualified)

=== Qualifiers ===
1. (Romania) Ilona Georgiana Ghioroaie
2. (Greece) Martha Matoula
3. Ekaterina Makarova
4. (Ukraine) Anastasiya Soboleva

=== Lucky loser ===
1. (Turkey) İpek Öz

=== Qualifying draw ===
==== First qualifier ====
First round				Qualifying competition
					(Romania) Ilona Georgiana Ghioroaie	6	6
WC	(Romania) Ilinca Amariei	2	2	6	(Ukraine) Valeriya Strakhova	1	2
6	(Ukraine) Valeriya Strakhova	6	6

==== Second qualifier ====
First round
2	(Turkey) İpek Öz	6	6
(United States) Quinn Gleason	4	2
WC	(Romania) Mara Gae	2	7^{7}	2
7	(Greece) Martha Matoula	6	6^{5}	6

Qualifying competition
2	(Turkey) İpek Öz	6^{7}	6	5
7	(Greece) Martha Matoula	7^{9}	4	7

==== Third qualifier ====
First round
3	Ekaterina Makarova	6	6
WC	(Romania) Briana Szabó	3	3
(Switzerland) Susan Bandecchi	6	4	7
5	(Greece) Valentini Grammatikopoulou	3	6	5

Qualifying competition
3	Ekaterina Makarova	7	7
(Switzerland) Susan Bandecchi	5	5

==== Fourth qualifier ====
First round
4	(Slovenia) Dalila Jakupović	4	1
WC	(Germany) Vivian Heisen	6	6
(Romania) Maria Sara Popa	2	6	4
8	(Ukraine) Anastasiya Soboleva	6	2	6

Qualifying competition
WC	(Germany) Vivian Heisen	2	1^{r}
8	(Ukraine) Anastasiya Soboleva	6	2
