= 2023 Transylvania Open =

- Date: 16–22 October
- Edition: 3rd
- Category: WTA 250
- Draw: 32S / 15Q / 16D
- Prize money: $259,303
- Surface: Hard (Indoor)
- Location: Cluj-Napoca, Romania
- Venue: BT Arena

Champions

Singles
- (Germany) Tamara Korpatsch

Doubles
- (United Kingdom) Jodie Burrage / (Switzerland) Jil Teichmann
| ← 2022 · | Transylvania Open | · 2024 → |

The 2023 Transylvania Open was a women's tennis tournament played on indoor hard courts. It was the third edition of the Transylvania Open, and part of the WTA 250 series of the 2023 WTA Tour. It was held at the BT Arena in Cluj-Napoca, Romania, from 16 until 22 October 2023.

== Champions ==
=== Singles ===
- (Germany) Tamara Korpatsch def. (Romania) Elena-Gabriela Ruse 6–3, 6–4

=== Doubles ===
- (United Kingdom) Jodie Burrage / (Switzerland) Jil Teichmann def. (France) Léolia Jeanjean / (Ukraine) Valeriya Strakhova 6–1, 6–4

== Singles main draw entrants ==
=== Seeds ===
| Country | Player | Rank^{1} | Seed |
|---|---|---|---|
| ROU | Sorana Cîrstea | 26 | 1 |
| USA | Alycia Parks | 53 | 2 |
| BEL | Greet Minnen | 62 | 3 |
| ESP | Rebeka Masarova | 69 | 4 |
| ROU | Ana Bogdan | 72 | 5 |
| BEL | Yanina Wickmayer | 83 | 6 |
| UKR | Kateryna Baindl | 84 | 7 |
| GBR | Jodie Burrage | 91 | 8 |

- Rankings are as of 9 October 2023.

=== Other entrants ===
The following players received wildcards into the main draw:

- (Czech Republic) Nikola Bartůňková
- (Romania) Miriam Bulgaru
- (Romania) Elena-Gabriela Ruse

The following player received entry using a protected ranking:

- (Romania) Patricia Maria Țig

The following players received entry from the qualifying draw:

- (Romania) Ilona Georgiana Ghioroaie
- Ekaterina Makarova
- (Greece) Martha Matoula
- (Ukraine) Anastasiya Soboleva

The following player received entry as a lucky loser:

- (Turkey) İpek Öz

=== Withdrawals ===
- (France) Caroline Garcia → replaced by (Switzerland) Jil Teichmann
- (Ukraine) Anhelina Kalinina → replaced by (France) Léolia Jeanjean
- Anastasia Pavlyuchenkova → replaced by (India) Ankita Raina
- (Czech Republic) Karolína Plíšková → replaced by (Turkey) İpek Öz
- (Denmark) Clara Tauson → replaced by (Ukraine) Daria Snigur
- (Croatia) Donna Vekić → replaced by (France) Jessika Ponchet

== Doubles main draw entrants ==
=== Seeds ===
| Country | Player | Country | Player | Rank^{1} | Seed |
|---|---|---|---|---|---|
| USA | Alycia Parks | ROU | Elena-Gabriela Ruse | 74 | 1 |
| HUN | Anna Bondár | BEL | Kimberley Zimmermann | 116 | 2 |
| BEL | Greet Minnen | BEL | Yanina Wickmayer | 131 | 3 |
| GER | Anna-Lena Friedsam | ROU | Monica Niculescu | 149 | 4 |

- Rankings are as of 9 October 2023.

=== Other entrants ===
The following pairs received wildcards into the doubles main draw:

- (Romania) Ilinca Amariei / (Romania) Briana Szabó
- (Romania) Mara Gae / (Bulgaria) Viktoriya Tomova

The following pair received entry as alternates:

- (Romania) Ilona Georgiana Ghioroaie / (Romania) Patricia Maria Țig

=== Withdrawals ===
- (United States) Quinn Gleason / (Ukraine) Dayana Yastremska → replaced by (Romania) Ilona Georgiana Ghioroaie / (Romania) Patricia Maria Țig
