= 2022 Transylvania Open – Singles =

Singles
- 2022 Transylvania Open

Final
- Champion: Anna Blinkova
- Runner-up: (Italy) Jasmine Paolini
- Score: 6–2, 3–6, 6–2

Details
- Draw: 32 (3 WC, 6Q)
- Seeds: 8

Events
Singles	Doubles
← 2021 ·	Transylvania Open	· 2023 →

Anna Blinkova defeated Jasmine Paolini in the final, 6–2, 3–6, 6–2 to win the singles tennis title at the 2022 Transylvania Open. It was her maiden WTA Tour singles title, and she won it as a qualifier.

Anett Kontaveit was the reigning champion, but did not participate this year.

== Seeds ==
1. (Czech Republic) Barbora Krejčíková (withdrew)
2. (Ukraine) Anhelina Kalinina (quarterfinals)
3. (Romania) Ana Bogdan (first round)
4. Anastasia Potapova (semifinals)
5. (Poland) Magda Linette (first round)
6. (Ukraine) Marta Kostyuk (first round)
7. (China) Wang Xiyu (semifinals)
8. (Hungary) Anna Bondár (quarterfinals)
9. (Italy) Lucia Bronzetti (first round)

== Draw ==
=== Key ===
- Q = Qualifier
- WC = Wild card
- LL = Lucky loser
- Alt = Alternate
- SE = Special exempt
- PR = Protected ranking
- ITF = ITF entry
- JE = Junior exempt
- w/o = Walkover
- r = Retired
- d = Defaulted
- SR = Special ranking

=== Finals ===
Semifinals
7	(China) Wang Xiyu	5	6	3
(Italy) Jasmine Paolini	7	4	6
4	Anastasia Potapova	7	4	4
Q	Anna Blinkova	5	6	6

Final
(Italy) Jasmine Paolini	2	6	2
Q	Anna Blinkova	6	3	6

=== Top half ===
First round
9	(Italy) L Bronzetti	6	2	4
(Hungary) D Gálfi	4	6	6
(Spain) N Párrizas Díaz	6	7
WC	(Romania) I Bara	1	5
WC	(Romania) E-G Ruse	6^{5}	6	6
LL	(France) H Tan	7^{7}	2	3
(Romania) J Cristian	3	3
7	(China) Xiy Wang	6	6
3	(Romania) A Bogdan	6^{5}	2
(Germany) J Niemeier	7^{7}	6
Q	(Serbia) O Danilović	2	4
Q	K Rakhimova	6	6
LL	(Germany) T Korpatsch	3	6	5
(Ukraine) D Yastremska	6	4	7
(Italy) J Paolini	5	6	6
6	(Ukraine) M Kostyuk	7	3	4

Second round
(Hungary) D Gálfi	1	4
(Spain) N Párrizas Díaz	6	6
WC	(Romania) E-G Ruse	1	7^{10}	6^{6}
7	(China) Xiy Wang	6	6^{8}	7^{8}
(Germany) J Niemeier	6	6
Q	K Rakhimova	4	4
(Ukraine) D Yastremska	4	1
(Italy) J Paolini	6	6

Quarterfinals
(Spain) N Párrizas Díaz	1	6^{5}
7	(China) Xiy Wang	6	7^{7}
(Germany) J Niemeier	5	5
(Italy) J Paolini	7	7

Semifinals
7	(China) Xiy Wang	5	6	3
(Italy) J Paolini	7	4	6

=== Bottom half ===
First round
8	(Hungary) A Bondár	6	6
Q	E Avanesyan	4	2
LL	(France) O Dodin	2	0
(United Kingdom) H Dart	6	6
(Switzerland) V Golubic	7	7^{8}
(France) D Parry	5	6^{6}
(United States) A Li	2	6^{5}
4	A Potapova	6	7^{7}
5	(Poland) M Linette	2	4
(China) Xin Wang	6	6
Q	A Zakharova	1	6^{7}
Q	A Blinkova	6	7^{9}
V Gracheva	5	5
Q	(Belgium) Y Bonaventure	7	7
WC	(Canada) E Bouchard	3	0^{r}
2	(Ukraine) A Kalinina	6	0

Second round
8	(Hungary) A Bondár	7^{7}	6
(United Kingdom) H Dart	6^{3}	4
(Switzerland) V Golubic	2	3
4	A Potapova	6	6
(China) Xin Wang	4	6	1
Q	A Blinkova	6	2	6
Q	(Belgium) Y Bonaventure	3	2
2	(Ukraine) A Kalinina	6	6

Quarterfinals
8	(Hungary) A Bondár	5	6	1
4	A Potapova	7	3	6
Q	A Blinkova	6^{7}	6	6
2	(Ukraine) A Kalinina	7^{9}	1	3

Semifinals
4	A Potapova	7	4	4
Q	A Blinkova	5	6	6

== Qualifying ==
=== Seeds ===
1. (Bulgaria) Viktoriya Tomova (first round)
2. (Ukraine) Dayana Yastremska (moved to main draw)
3. (Ukraine) Lesia Tsurenko (first round)
4. (Germany) Tamara Korpatsch (qualifying competition, lucky loser)
5. (France) Océane Dodin (qualifying competition, retired, lucky loser)
6. (Japan) Misaki Doi (first round)
7. (France) Clara Burel (first round)
8. (France) Harmony Tan (qualifying competition, lucky loser)
9. (Belgium) Ysaline Bonaventure (qualified)
10. Kamilla Rakhimova (qualified)
11. Elina Avanesyan (qualified)
12. (Sweden) Mirjam Björklund (qualifying competition)

=== Qualifiers ===
1. (Belgium) Ysaline Bonaventure
2. Anastasia Zakharova
3. Anna Blinkova
4. Elina Avanesyan
5. Kamilla Rakhimova
6. (Serbia) Olga Danilović

=== Lucky losers ===
1. (Germany) Tamara Korpatsch
2. (France) Océane Dodin
3. (France) Harmony Tan

=== Qualifying draw ===
==== First qualifier ====
First round
1	(Bulgaria) Viktoriya Tomova	4	1
WC	(Romania) Cristina Dinu	6	6
(Ukraine) Kateryna Baindl	7^{7}	4	4
9	(Belgium) Ysaline Bonaventure	6^{3}	6	6

Qualifying competition
WC	(Romania) Cristina Dinu	4	5
9	(Belgium) Ysaline Bonaventure	6	7

==== Second qualifier ====
First round
Alt	Anastasia Zakharova	6	6
(Romania) Gabriela Lee	1	3
WC	(Romania) Alexandra Cadanțu-Ignatik	5	6	6
7	(France) Clara Burel	7	3	3

Qualifying competition
Alt	Anastasia Zakharova	6	6
WC	(Romania) Alexandra Cadanțu-Ignatik	4	1

==== Third qualifier ====
First round
3	(Ukraine) Lesia Tsurenko	2	5
Anna Blinkova	6	7
(Georgia (country)) Ekaterine Gorgodze	3	6	0
12	(Sweden) Mirjam Björklund	6	4	6

Qualifying competition
Anna Blinkova	6	6
12	(Sweden) Mirjam Björklund	2	2

==== Fourth qualifier ====
First round
4	(Germany) Tamara Korpatsch	1	6	6
Anastasia Gasanova	6	2	3
WC	(Romania) Briana Szabó	1	0
11	Elina Avanesyan	6	6

Qualifying competition
4	(Germany) Tamara Korpatsch	4	5
11	Elina Avanesyan	6	7

==== Fifth qualifier ====
First round
5	(France) Océane Dodin	6	6
(Croatia) Ana Konjuh	4	4
Oksana Selekhmeteva	2	2
10	Kamilla Rakhimova	6	6

Qualifying competition
5	(France) Océane Dodin	2^{r}
10	Kamilla Rakhimova	5

==== Sixth qualifier ====
First round
6	(Japan) Misaki Doi	7	0	6^{3}
PR	(Serbia) Olga Danilović	5	6	7^{7}
WC	(Romania) Lavinia Tănasie	3	1
8	(France) Harmony Tan	6	6

Qualifying competition
PR	(Serbia) Olga Danilović	7	4	6
8	(France) Harmony Tan	5	6	3
