= 2022 Transylvania Open – Doubles =

Doubles
- 2022 Transylvania Open

Final
- Champions: (Belgium) Kirsten Flipkens (Germany) Laura Siegemund
- Runners-up: Kamilla Rakhimova; Yana Sizikova
- Score: 6–3, 7–5

Events
Singles	Doubles
← 2021 ·	Transylvania Open	· 2023 →

Kirsten Flipkens and Laura Siegemund defeated Kamilla Rakhimova and Yana Sizikova in the final, 6–3, 7–5 to win the doubles tennis title at the 2022 Transylvania Open.

Irina Bara and Ekaterine Gorgodze were the defending champions, but lost in the first round to Rakhimova and Sizikova.

== Seeds ==
1. (Belgium) Kirsten Flipkens / (Germany) Laura Siegemund (champions)
2. (Norway) Ulrikke Eikeri / (Slovakia) Tereza Mihalíková (quarterfinals)
3. (Georgia (country)) Natela Dzalamidze / Alexandra Panova (first round)
4. (Georgia (country)) Oksana Kalashnikova / (Ukraine) Marta Kostyuk (first round)

== Draw ==
=== Key ===
- Q = Qualifier
- WC = Wild card
- LL = Lucky loser
- Alt = Alternate
- SE = Special exempt
- PR = Protected ranking
- ITF = ITF entry
- JE = Junior exempt
- w/o = Walkover
- r = Retired
- d = Defaulted
- SR = Special ranking

=== Draw ===
First round
1	(Belgium) K Flipkens (Germany) L Siegemund	6	7
(United Kingdom) A Barnett (United Kingdom) O Nicholls	2	5
(Italy) L Bronzetti (Italy) J Paolini	6	5	[10]
WC	(Hungary) T Babos (United States) I Neel	3	7	[7]
4	(Georgia (country)) O Kalashnikova (Ukraine) M Kostyuk	5	2
(Hungary) A Bondár (Hungary) D Gálfi	7	6
(Japan) M Kato (United States) A Kulikov	3	2
A Gabueva; A Zakharova	6	6
WC	(Romania) J Cristian (Romania) E-G Ruse	4	7	[5]
(United Kingdom) H Dart (Romania) M Niculescu	6	5	[10]
(Switzerland) V Golubic (China) X Han	6	3	[11]
3	(Georgia (country)) N Dzalamidze; A Panova	2	6	[9]
K Rakhimova; Y Sizikova	6	6
(Romania) I Bara (Georgia (country)) E Gorgodze	1	1
(Czech Republic) A Dețiuc (Czech Republic) R Voráčová	4	6^{1}
2	(Norway) U Eikeri (Slovakia) T Mihalíková	6	7^{7}

Quarterfinals
1	(Belgium) K Flipkens (Germany) L Siegemund	6	6
(Italy) L Bronzetti (Italy) J Paolini	1	4
(Hungary) A Bondár (Hungary) D Gálfi	4	6^{5}
A Gabueva; A Zakharova	6	7^{7}
(United Kingdom) H Dart (Romania) M Niculescu	6	4	[3]
(Switzerland) V Golubic (China) X Han	3	6	[10]
K Rakhimova; Y Sizikova	6	4	[10]
2	(Norway) U Eikeri (Slovakia) T Mihalíková	2	6	[7]

Semifinals
1	(Belgium) K Flipkens (Germany) L Siegemund	6	7^{7}
A Gabueva; A Zakharova	3	6^{2}
(Switzerland) V Golubic (China) X Han	2	6	[11]
K Rakhimova; Y Sizikova	6	1	[13]

Final
1	(Belgium) K Flipkens (Germany) L Siegemund	6	7
K Rakhimova; Y Sizikova	3	5
