= Kirsten Flipkens =

Belgian tennis player

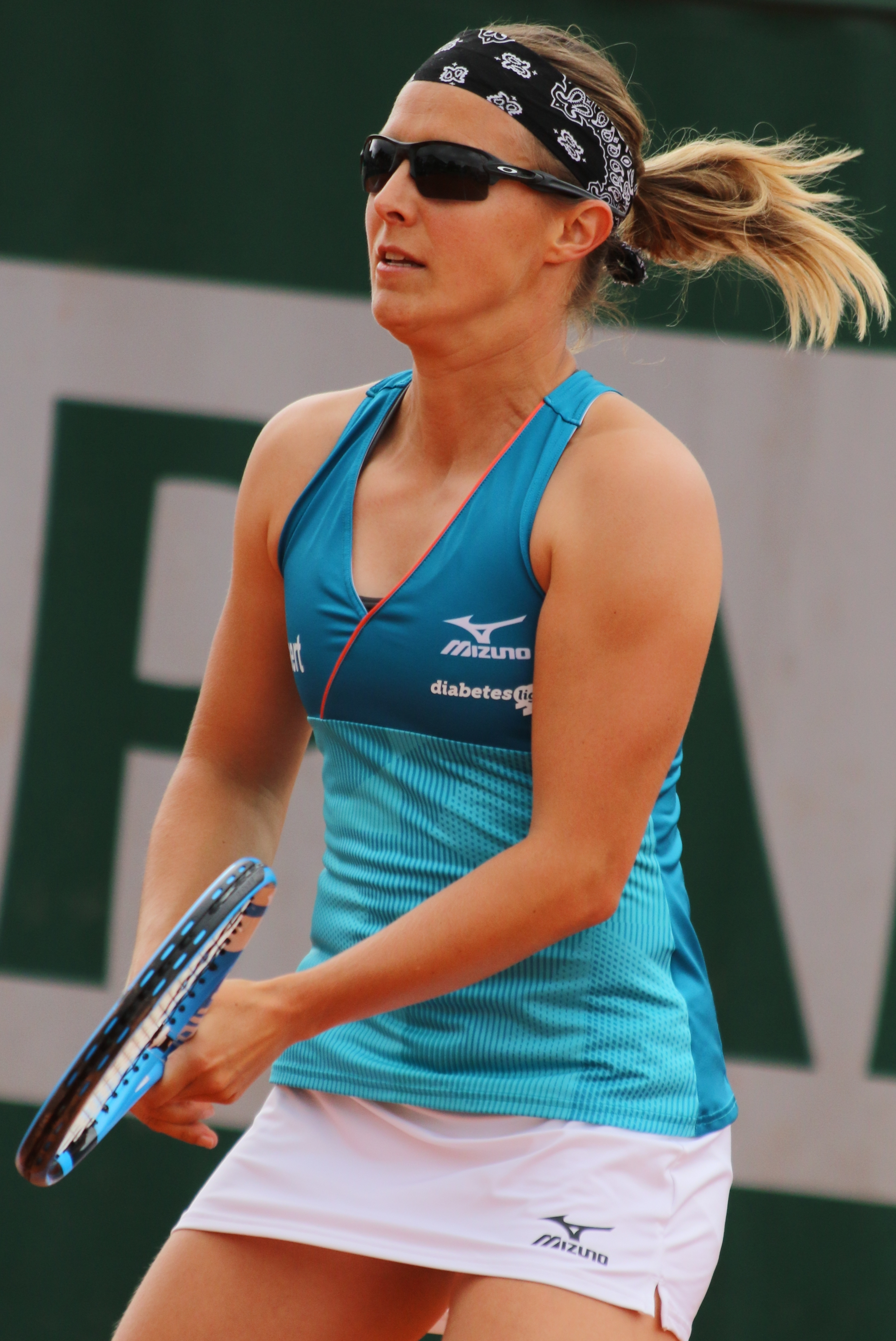
- Flipkens at the 2019 French Open
- Country (sports): Belgium
- Residence: Mol, Belgium
- Born: 10 January 1986 (age 40) Geel, Belgium
- Height: 1.65 m (5 ft 5 in)
- Turned pro: 2003
- Retired: July 2023
- Plays: Right-handed (two-handed backhand)
- Coach: Maxime Braeckman
- Prize money: $6,240,599
- Official website: kirstenflipkens.be

Singles
- Career record: 542–400
- Career titles: 1
- Highest ranking: No. 13 (5 August 2013)

Grand Slam singles results
- Australian Open: 4R (2013)
- French Open: 2R (2006, 2009, 2010, 2013, 2014, 2017, 2018)
- Wimbledon: SF (2013)
- US Open: 3R (2009)

Doubles
- Career record: 170–166
- Career titles: 7
- Highest ranking: No. 23 (1 July 2019)
- Current ranking: No. 221 (22 April 2024)

Grand Slam doubles results
- Australian Open: QF (2022)
- French Open: SF (2019)
- Wimbledon: 3R (2017, 2018, 2022, 2023)
- US Open: QF (2022)

Grand Slam mixed doubles results
- Australian Open: 1R (2020, 2022, 2023)
- French Open: 1R (2013)
- Wimbledon: 3R (2018)
- US Open: F (2022)

Team competitions
- Fed Cup: F (2006), record 18–35

Kirsten "Flipper" Flipkens (Dutch pronunciation: [ˈkɪrstə(ɱ) ˈflɪpkə(n)s]; born 10 January 1986) is a Belgian tennis coach and a former professional player. She reached a career-high ranking of world No. 13. Flipkens has won one singles title on the WTA Tour, winning the 2012 Tournoi de Québec, as well as seven doubles titles. She also won 13 singles titles and two doubles titles on the ITF Women's Circuit, and one singles title on the WTA Challenger Tour.

She had success as a junior, winning the girls' doubles title at the 2002 US Open and the singles titles at the 2003 Wimbledon Championships and the 2003 US Open. Her best Grand Slam performance as a senior was at the 2013 Wimbledon Championships, where she reached the semifinal. In the same year, she was crowned Sportswoman of the Year at the Belgian Sport Awards. In 2016, Flipkens entered her first Olympic Games in Rio de Janeiro and made it to the third round in singles. She is also the Belgian player who has played the most years in Fed Cup (16 years as of 2019). For this reason, she received the Fed Cup Commitment Award in 2016.

== Early life ==
Flipkens was born on 10 January 1986 in Geel, Belgium as the only child of a car dealer and a housewife. She began playing tennis at four years old. Flipkens played tennis, football, volleyball and basketball before eventually deciding to pursue a career as a tennis player at the age of 12. She then went to the tennis academy in Wilrijk where she became friends with Kim Clijsters. At the age of 17, after winning Wimbledon and the US Open as a junior, she dropped out of school to continue her career as a professional tennis player. She speaks Dutch, English, French and German. One of her trademarks is her prescription glasses, which she needs to wear due to being near-sighted.

== Juniors ==
In 2001, Flipkens won the bronze medal at the European Youth Olympic Festival in Murcia, Spain.

In 2002, Flipkens and Elke Clijsters won the US Open girls' doubles title, beating Shadisha Robsinon and Tory Zawacki in the final with 6–1, 6–3.

In 2003, Flipkens won the Wimbledon Championships in girls' singles, beating Anna Chakvetadze 6–4, 3–6, 6–3 and the US Open in girls' singles, defeating Michaëlla Krajicek, 6–3, 7–5. Following her two wins in two major juniors events, Flipkens was selected to join the Belgium Fed Cup team for the 2003 Fed Cup's semifinal opposing the United States. She played her first Fed Cup match against then WTA No. 17, Meghann Shaughnessy and lost 7–6, 6–7, 7–9. She finished 2003 as world No. 1 of the junior rankings in both singles and doubles. At the end of the year, she was awarded Best Belgian Talent and named ITF Junior World Champion.

== Professional ==
=== 2001–08: First steps, problem with injuries ===
Flipkens played her first professional match on the ITF Women's Circuit in 2001 at the age of 15. Next year, she won her first ITF singles title at a $10k event in Pétange, when she defeated German qualifier Tanja Hirschauer, and two weeks later another $10k title in Koksijde. The following year, Flipkens made her debut at the WTA Tour, at the Diamonds Games in Antwerp, but finished her participation at the beginning of the tournament. 2004 was the first year when she attempted to qualify in Wimbledon into the main draw of a major. After a first-round loss at the Gaz de France Stars in September, Flipkens stated that she struggled with a congenital back injury during the second half of 2004. She was unable to play for several months.

She made her return at $50k event in Saint-Gaudens in May 2005, but lost in her first match. In late May, she made her debut in the qualifying of the French Open. Later, she also failed in qualifying for Wimbledon and the US Open. In 2006, Flipkens made big steps further, reaching the main draws at the French Open, Wimbledon and the US Open. At the French Open, she recorded her first Grand Slam match win, defeating qualifier Virginie Pichet, but lost in the next round to Flavia Pennetta. At the US Open, she got to the same stage of tournament, falling to eventual semifinalist Jelena Janković, while at Wimbledon, she lost in the first round. She also partnered with British No. 2, Andy Murray, in mixed doubles at Wimbledon.

Flipkens started 2007 season with modest results, including only first rounds at the Australian Open and Diamond Games. In May, she stated that she suffered from a wrist injury, which resulted in not being able to play for several months. She returned in September, playing mostly at the ITF Circuit, with reaching only one final at the $50k event in Deauville, where she lost. In 2008, due to injury from previous year that caused falling in the rankings, she was forced to play mostly at ITF tournaments. She reached four finals, winning three of them, including a $75k title at the Open Féminin de Marseille. She started the year as world No. 287, but climbed till the end to No. 104.

=== 2009–10: Breakthrough into the top 100, continues with injuries ===
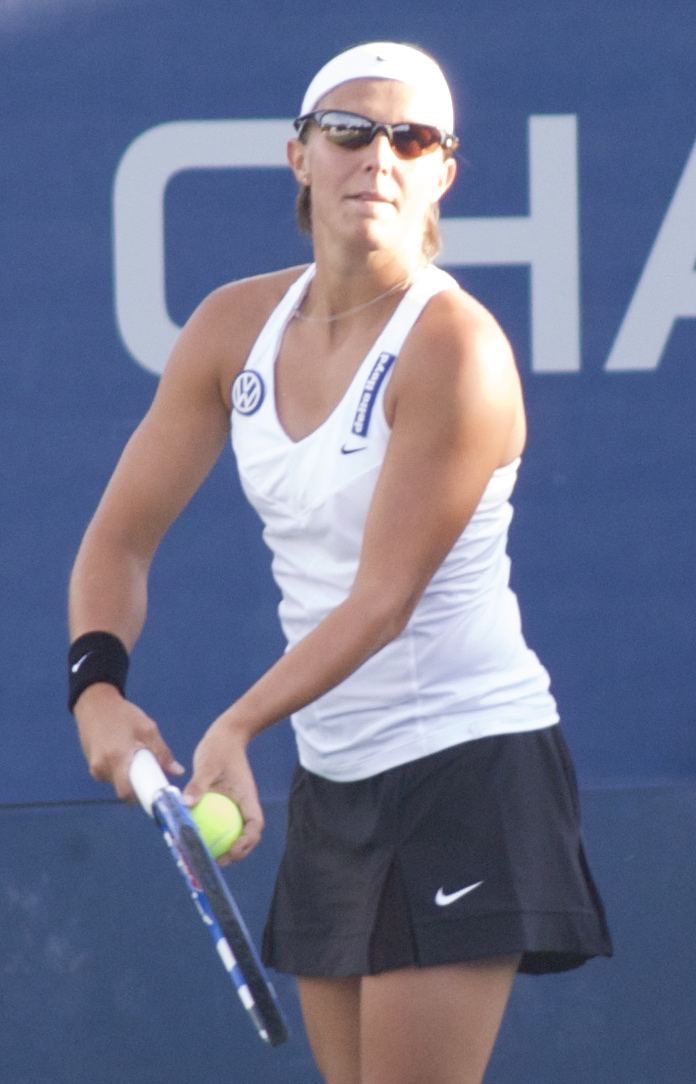
Kirsten Flipkens at the 2009 US Open

Flipkens played at the Australian Open, where she recorded her first win there, defeating Rossana de los Ríos, before she was knocked out the tournament by top seed Jelena Janković. On her next appearances, she was eliminated in the first round at U.S. National Indoors, Barcelona Open, Estoril Open and Internationaux de Strasbourg. She then reached another Grand Slam second round at the French Open. She started the grass-court season with a loss at the Rosmalen Championships, but then reached her first Major third round at Wimbledon. She failed to reach her first round of 16, losing to top-seeded Dinara Safina, 5–7, 1–6, after having a set point in the first set.

At the US Open, she reached another Grand Slam third round, after straight-sets victories over Jelena Dokic and Anabel Medina Garrigues. She suffered a defeat in the third round, losing to compatriot and eventual champion Kim Clijsters, 0–6, 2–6. In October 2009, she again defeated Medina Garrigues to reach the quarterfinals of the Luxembourg Open, where her compatriot Yanina Wickmayer stopped her from reaching the first semifinal on the WTA Tour. Flipkens reached the top 100 for the first time in her career at the end of 2009.

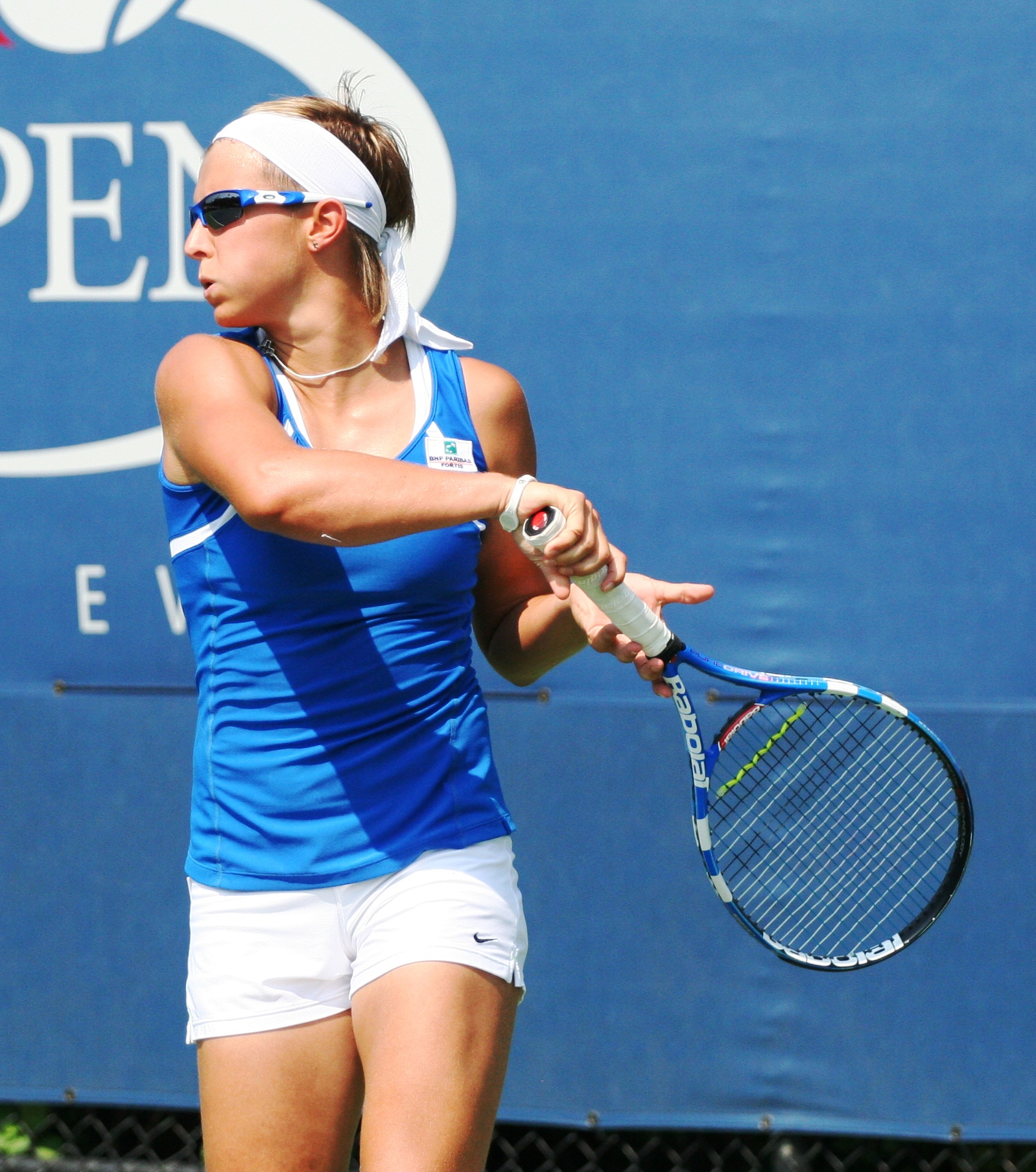
Kirsten Flipkens in 2010

Flipkens continued her good results in 2010. She first reached the quarterfinals at the Hobart International, where she went through qualifying. In the quarterfinal match, she lost to Sara Erani in straight sets. At the Australian Open, Flipkens lost in the first round to another unseeded (her comeback) Justine Henin, 4–6, 3–6. In March, she made her debut at the Premier 5/Premier Mandatory tournaments. On her way to the third round at Indian Wells, she beat Timea Bacsinszky and Aleksandra Wozniack, before she was eliminated by Elena Dementieva.

At the French Open, she defeated Ayumi Morita in the first round, 6–1, 6–4, before Maria Sharapova defeated her in straight sets in the second. In the week before Wimbledon, she reached semifinals of the Rosmalen Championships but lost to Andrea Petkovic. At Wimbledon, she lost in the second round to Yanina Wickmayer. At the US Open, she failed to repeat her third-round appearance of the previous year, losing in the first round to Patty Schnyder. By the end of the year, she reached two International-level quarterfinals, at the Korea Open and Luxembourg Open. She had been troubled by a recurring wrist injury and underwent surgery at the end of the 2010 season.

=== 2011–12: First WTA Tour title ===
Flipkens struggled at the beginning of 2011, starting with a first-round loss at the Australian Open and did not win one singles match on the WTA Tour in main draws until May. She then reached the semifinals at the Morocco Open in Fes, during the clay-court season. At the Rosmalen Championships, she teamed up with CoCo Vandeweghe to reach the semifinals in doubles. By the end of the year, she didn't make any significant result, primarily losing in the first rounds and failing in the qualifyings.

After weak results in the second half of 2011, she returned to the ITF Circuit. She made two $25k level finals but failed to win the title in both of them. Then in April 2012, doctors discovered four life-threatening blood clots in her calf, which prevented her from playing for two months. During this time, her ranking dropped to No. 262, and she lost her funding from the Flemish Tennis Association (VTV). She returned to the WTA Tour at the Rosmalen Championships, where she beat Samantha Stosur in the first round and later reached semifinals, before she lost to Nadia Petrova. She qualified for the US Open and made it to the second round, where she was defeated by eventual finalist, Victoria Azarenka. She also partnered with Kim Clijsters in doubles, but they were beaten in the first round.

In September 2012, she won the Tournoi de Québec that also was her first WTA Tour title, after wins over top-seeded Dominika Cibulková, Mona Barthel and Lucie Hradecká, among others. She continued with success, participating at the Generali Ladies Linz tournament in October, where she won through qualifying and got onto the main draw. She then defeated Alizé Cornet in the first round, a qualifier in the second round, and second seed Ana Ivanovic 6–4, 6–0 in the quarterfinals. She then lost in three sets to Julia Görges in the semifinals. This result brought her to a career-high 58th position in the WTA rankings. During this month, Kim Clijsters announced that she would help her as a part-coach.

=== 2013: Wimbledon semifinalist, breakthrough into the top 15 ===
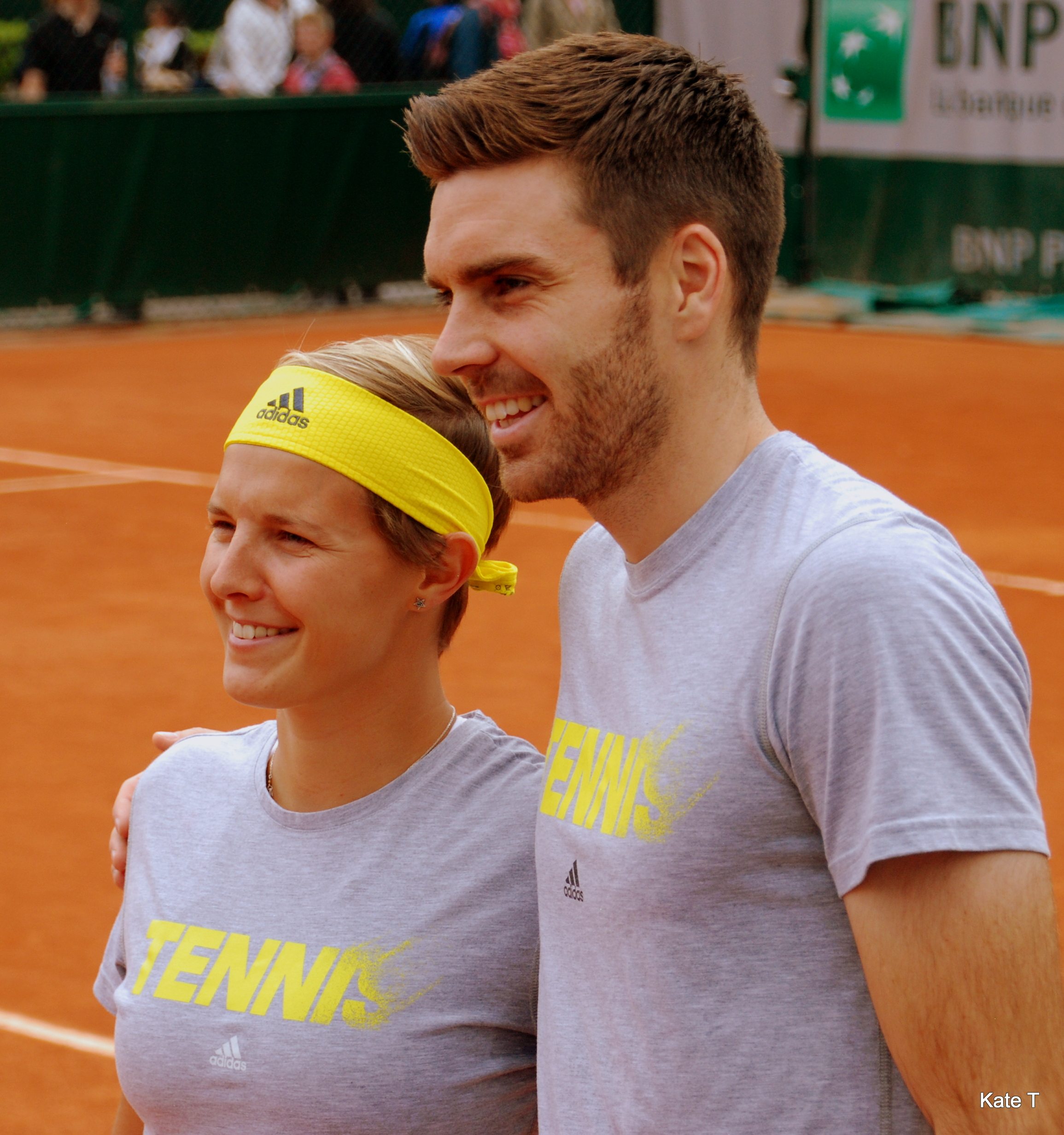
Kirsten Flipkens with Colin Fleming

Flipkens started her 2013 season really well, reaching quarterfinal at the ASB Classic, where she lost from her compatriot Yanina Wickmayer. Next week, at the Hobart International, she defeated Francesca Schiavone in the first round and continued with wins over Bojana Jovanovski and Monica Niculescu, before falling to Mona Barthel in the semifinals. Her next tournament was the first Grand Slam of the year, the Australian Open. She defeated Mandy Minella, Klara Zakopalová, and Valeria Savinykh in the first rounds to advance to the fourth round where she lost 1–6, 0–6 to Maria Sharapova. That was the first time she reached that stage at any Grand Slam tournament.

She then proceeded to reach the quarterfinal of the U.S. Indoor Championships, losing there to Magdaléna Rybáriková. At the Indian Wells Open, she got bye for the first round, then beat Monica Niculescu in the second round before she lost from Victoria Azarenka. Next, she reached quarterfinal of the Miami Open, where she also got bye for the first round, and then beating Petra Kvitová in the second round before eventually falling to Agnieszka Radwańska. She started the French Open as 21st seed, and beat Flavia Pennetta in the first round before losing to 2010-champion Francesca Schiavone. She also played in mixed doubles, partnering Colin Fleming, but they lost in the first round. After the French Open, Flipkens reached top 20 for the first time.

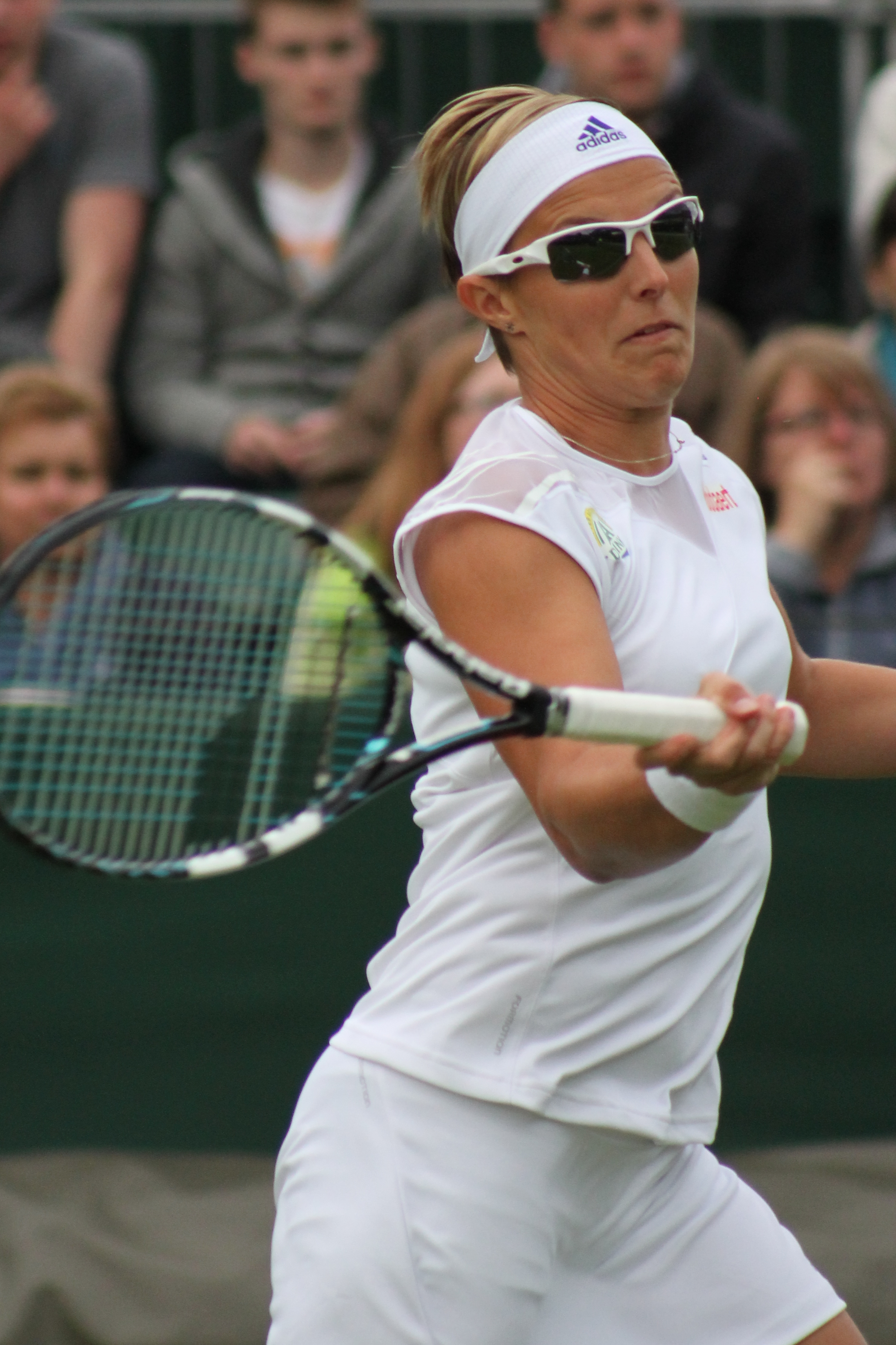
Kirsten Flipkens at the 2013 Wimbledon

To prepare for Wimbledon, Flipkens participated in the Birmingham Classic. Top-seeded, with a bye in the first round, she beat qualifier Ajla Tomljanović, before she lost to Magdaléna Rybáriková in the third round. A week later, at the Rosmalen Grass Court Championships, Flipkens advanced to the final but was ultimately beaten by Simona Halep. Flipkens played at Wimbledon as the 20th seed having not even played in the qualifiers the previous year due to her low ranking. She exceeded expectations by advancing to the semifinals of a Grand Slam for the first time in her career, beating Flavia Pennetta in the fourth round and former champion Petra Kvitová with in the quarterfinals. However, she was defeated 6–1, 6–2 by eventual champion Marion Bartoli in the semifinals. During her semifinal match, Flipkens suffered a knee injury, due to which she didn't play for one month. A month after this performance, Flipkens reached a career-high ranking of 13th in the world.

In the first round of the Canadian Open, she beat Venus Williams and reached the quarterfinal before losing to world No. 1, Serena Williams. She began the US Open as 12th seed. However, she was beaten in straight sets in the first round by two-time champion Venus Williams, who took revenge for her loss against Flipkens two weeks earlier in Toronto. In October, she reached the quarterfinals at the Linz Open, losing there to Carla Suárez Navarro. In December, she took part in the Kim Clijsters Invitational, an exhibition tournament where she won against Ana Ivanovic in a singles match and lost against Kim Clijsters and Xavier Malisse, whilst partnering Henri Leconte in a mixed doubles match. She finished the year as world No. 20.

=== 2014–15: Solid results ===
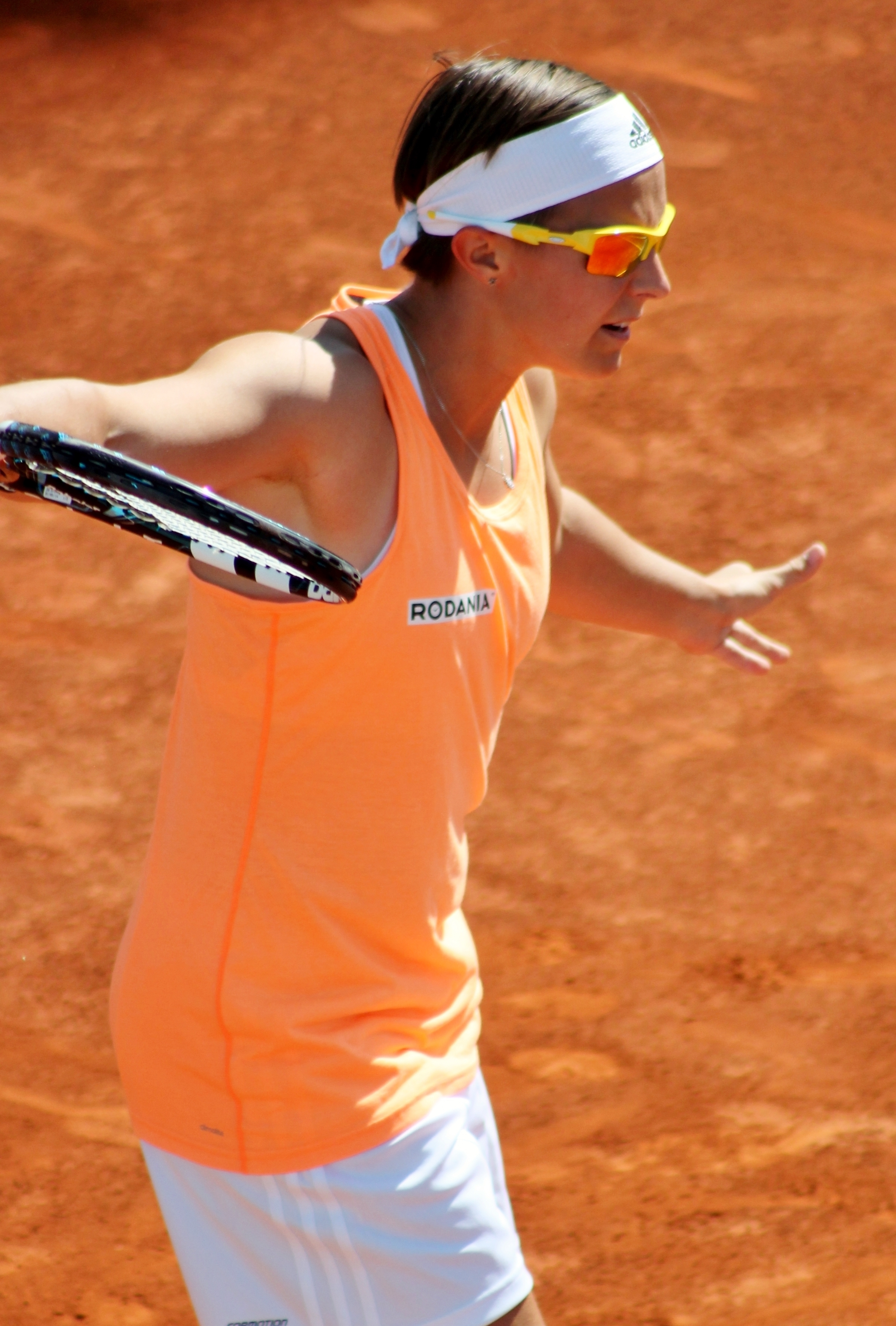
Kirsten Flipkens at the 2014 Madrid Open

Flipkens began the year by reaching the semifinals at the Auckland Open, losing 0–6, 6–7 to Ana Ivanovic. The next week, she reached the quarterfinals of the Hobart International, before losing to Garbiñe Muguruza. She then beat Laura Robson in the Australian Open, where she ended up reaching the second round in which she was defeated by Casey Dellacqua. In February, she made it into the quarterfinals of Open GDF Suez in Paris, but lost to Maria Sharapova. Month later, she reached the fourth round at the Miami Open, before losing to Sharapova again.

In the French Open, Flipkens lost in the second round to Julia Glushko. Flipkens withdrew from the second round in doubles, with Dominika Cibulková, after she had fainted on court during training and doctors at the site had sent her to the hospital where she would spend the night on intensive care since heart problems were feared. However, later tests revealed that she was healthy and fit to play.

Flipkens started grass-court season with the quarterfinals of the Birmingham Classic, where she was beaten by Barbora Záhlavová-Strýcová. Next week, she reached second round of the Mallorca Open, being knocked out the tournament by Elina Svitolina. At Wimbledon, she won against two lower-ranking players in the first two rounds, before losing to No. 9 seed Angelique Kerber.

In the second half of the season, Flipkens was less successful. As a wildcard in the tournament of Connecticut Open in New Haven, she made it into the quarterfinal after an epic match against Andrea Petkovic but was eventually beaten by Samantha Stosur. At Premier 5-level Cincinnati Open, she recorded her first win there, defeating qualifier Polona Hercog, but later was eliminated by No. 2 seed Simona Halep. At the US Open, she repeated last year result, losing in the first round. Later she played at the Wuhan Open, defeating two qualifiers, before she lost to Alizé Cornet. At the last three WTA tournaments of the year, she finished with first-round losses, at China Open, Linz Open and Luxembourg Open.

At the end of the season, she took part in the first edition of the International Premier Tennis League, where she played for the Manila Mavericks and was teammate with – amongst others – Maria Sharapova, Andy Murray and Jo-Wilfried Tsonga. In this two-and-a-half-week during event, Flipkens mainly excelled as a mixed-doubles player, alongside multiple champion Daniel Nestor. The Manila Mavericks ended third in the competition. Flipkens finished the season as No. 46 in the world.

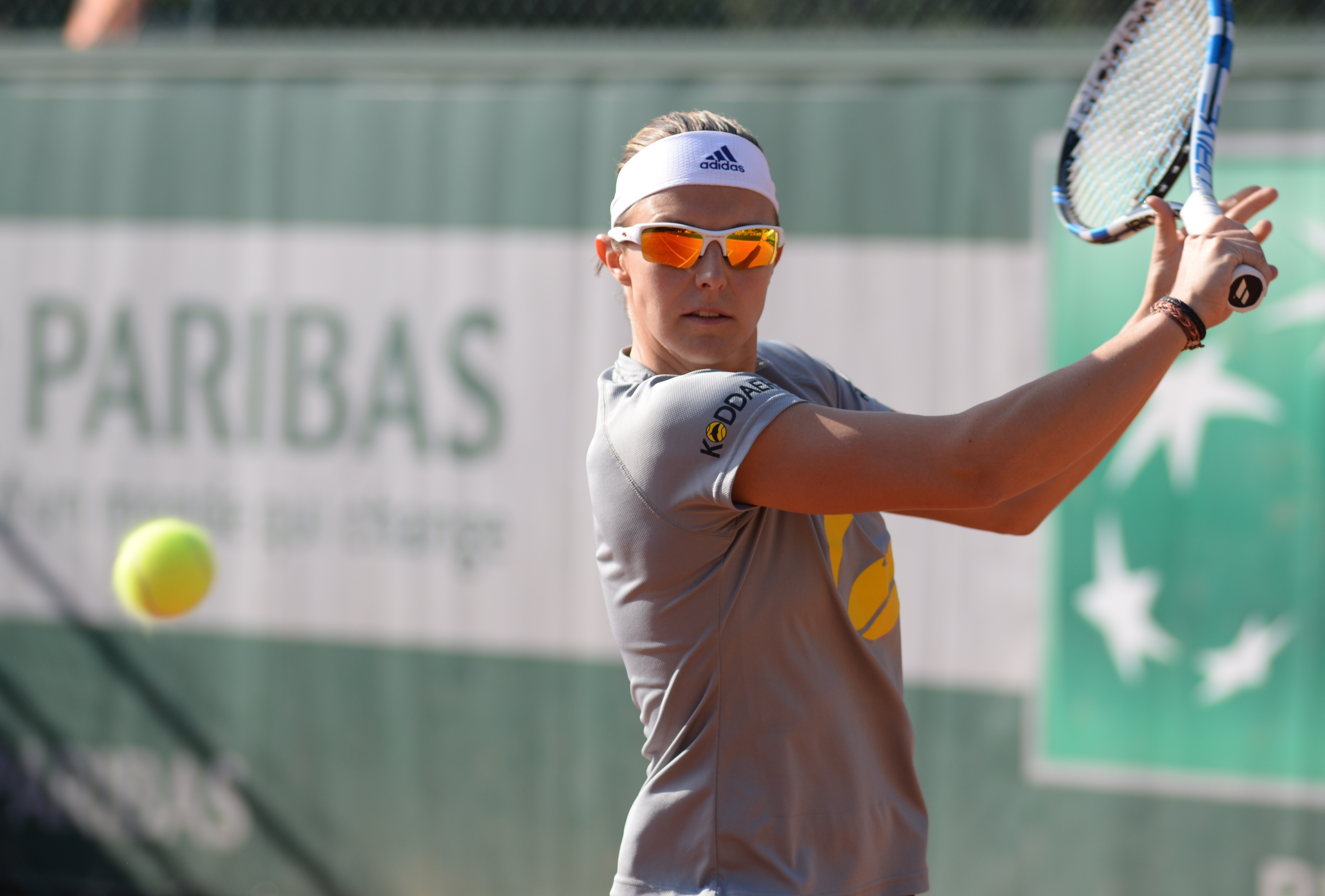
Kirsten Flipkens in 2015

Flipkens started 2015 with a knee injury and only won one match during the Australian season (against Johanna Larsson in Auckland). In the Australian Open 2015, she was beaten by friend and doubles partner Dominika Cibulková. She reached her first quarterfinal of the season at the Katowice Open, where she lost to compatriot Alison Van Uytvanck. During the Premier-level Stuttgart Open in April, she was forced to retire in qualification, because of an 11.5 cm tear in her upper leg. This healed better than expected and against all the odds she made it into the French Open, where she lost the first round against Elena Vesnina. She won only one match on grass-court season in 2015, defeating Annika beck at the Wimbledon, before she played the second round against former No. 1, Victoria Azarenka, but lost 4–6, 2–6. After Wimbledon, she fell out of the top 100 for the first time since 2012.

In July, she played her first semifinal in 2015 at İstanbul Cup, beating amongst others Francesca Schiavone and Alizé Cornet. The following week, she reached quarterfinal of International-level tournament at the Baku Cup. Thanks to these two good results, she made it back into the top 100. She proceeded to play the final of the $100k Vancouver Open, where she lost to Johanna Konta. At the US Open, she was beaten in the first round by Varvara Lepchenko. In doubles, she played alongside Laura Robson. They reached the second round, where they were beaten by fifth seeds Caroline Garcia and Katarina Srebotnik. After the US Open, Flipkens was diagnosed with a cyst on the wrist, which made her unable to play, resulting in her dropping out of the top 100 again. She made her comeback at the Linz Open. This comeback was successful for Flipkens, reaching the semifinal, where she beat amongst others the former No. 1, Caroline Wozniacki, before eventually falling to Anastasia Pavlyuchenkova. She officially finished the year 2015 as No. 93 in the world.

=== 2016: Olympic debut, first doubles title ===
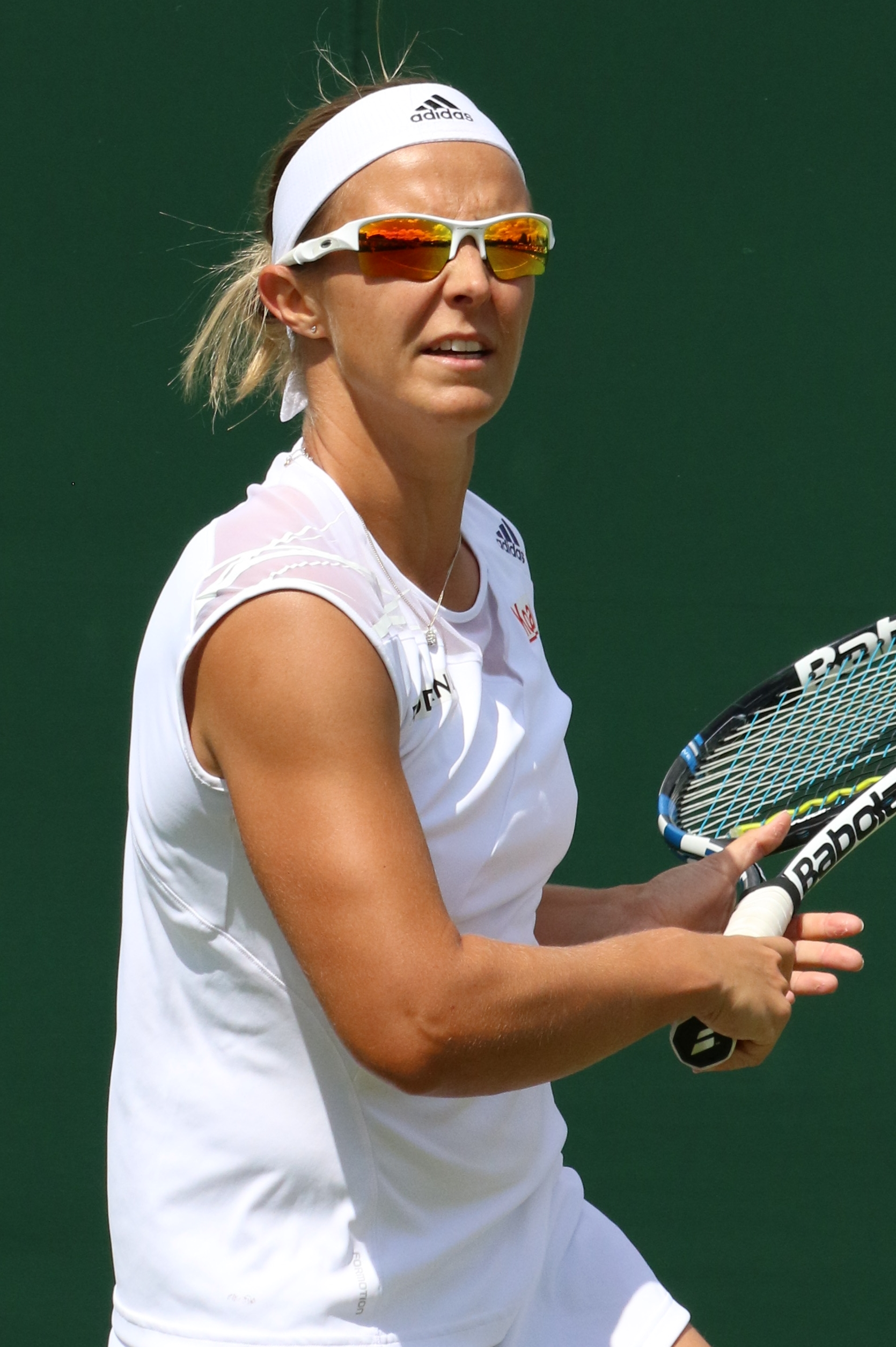
Flipkens at Wimbledon, 2016

Flipkens started the year with a quarterfinal in Auckland. She then reached the second round of the Australian Open, where she lost to third seed Garbiñe Muguruza. In doubles, she and her partner Dominika Cibulková had their best Grand Slam result yet. They reached the fourth round where they lost to Anastasia and Arina Rodionova. At the St. Petersburg Ladies' Trophy and Qatar Ladies Open, Flipkens lost in the first round. At the following tournament, the Monterrey Open, she advanced to the final beating Francesca Schiavone, Alison Van Uytvanck, Johanna Konta and Anett Kontaveit. She lost the final to Heather Watson. This good result was rewarded with a place back in the top 60, at No. 59. After missing to qualify at the Indian Wells Open and Miami Open, Flipkens went on to play the quarterfinals of Katowice, in which she was defeated by Camila Giorgi.

During the clay-court season Flipkens was plagued by a wrist injury, and only managed to win a single match, against Donna Vekić at the İstanbul Cup. At the French Open, she was eliminated by Alizé Cornet in the first round, winning only one game. In doubles, she and her partner Dominika Cibulková reached the second round, before they retired against fourth seeds Babos/Shvedova. At the Mallorca Open, Flipkens stunned versus freshly crowned French Open champion and world No. 2, Garbiñe Muguruza, beating her in the first round in straight sets. She proceeded to reach semifinals but was beaten by the eventual tournament winner, Caroline Garcia. Flipkens also reached the semifinals in doubles, partnered with Ana Ivanovic. At Wimbledon, Flipkens reached the second round, in which she lost to ninth seed Madison Keys.

Flipkens entered her first Olympics ever in both singles and doubles. In singles, she stunned the gold medalist from Sydney 2000, and three times doubles champion, Venus Williams, in the first round, defeating her in an epic match with 4–6, 6–3, 7–6. In the second round, Flipkens beat Lucie Šafářová, who retired after losing the first set with 6–2. Eventually, Flipkens was beaten in the round of 16 by Laura Siegemund from Germany. In doubles, Flipkens played alongside Yanina Wickmayer. In the first round, the Belgians faced Kazakh duo Shvedova/Voskoboeva, who retired after losing the first set 1–6. However, Flipkens and Wickmayer were defeated in the round of 16 by the Spanish team Muguruza/Suárez Navarro, the fourth seeds.

She then travelled to the United States and played at the Cincinnati Open, but failed to qualify. However, she reached quarterfinals of the Connecticut Open, before being beaten by Agnieszka Radwańska. She closed out her U.S. hardcourt tour with a first round-loss at the US Open, losing to fifth seed Simona Halep with 0–6, 2–6. In doubles, she also lost in the first round, alongside Belinda Bencic. By the end of the year, she marked her first doubles title at the Korea Open; partnering with Swedish player Johanna Larsson, she defeated Akiko Omae and Peangtarn Plipuech in the final.

At the end of the season, Flipkens took part in the IPTL for the third time in a row, as a member of the Micromax Indian Aces. The team ended runner-up, losing to the Singapore Slammers with 30–14. She was one of the players to receive the Fed Cup Commitment Award at the end of 2016 for being the Belgian player who's represented her country in the Fed Cup the longest: a total of 13 years in 2016. Flipkens was also nominated at the WTA Awards in the category of Shot of the Year for a spectacular behind-the-back winner she scored against Kristýna Plíšková in Seoul. Flipkens finished the year as No. 63 in the world.

=== 2017–20: Success in doubles ===
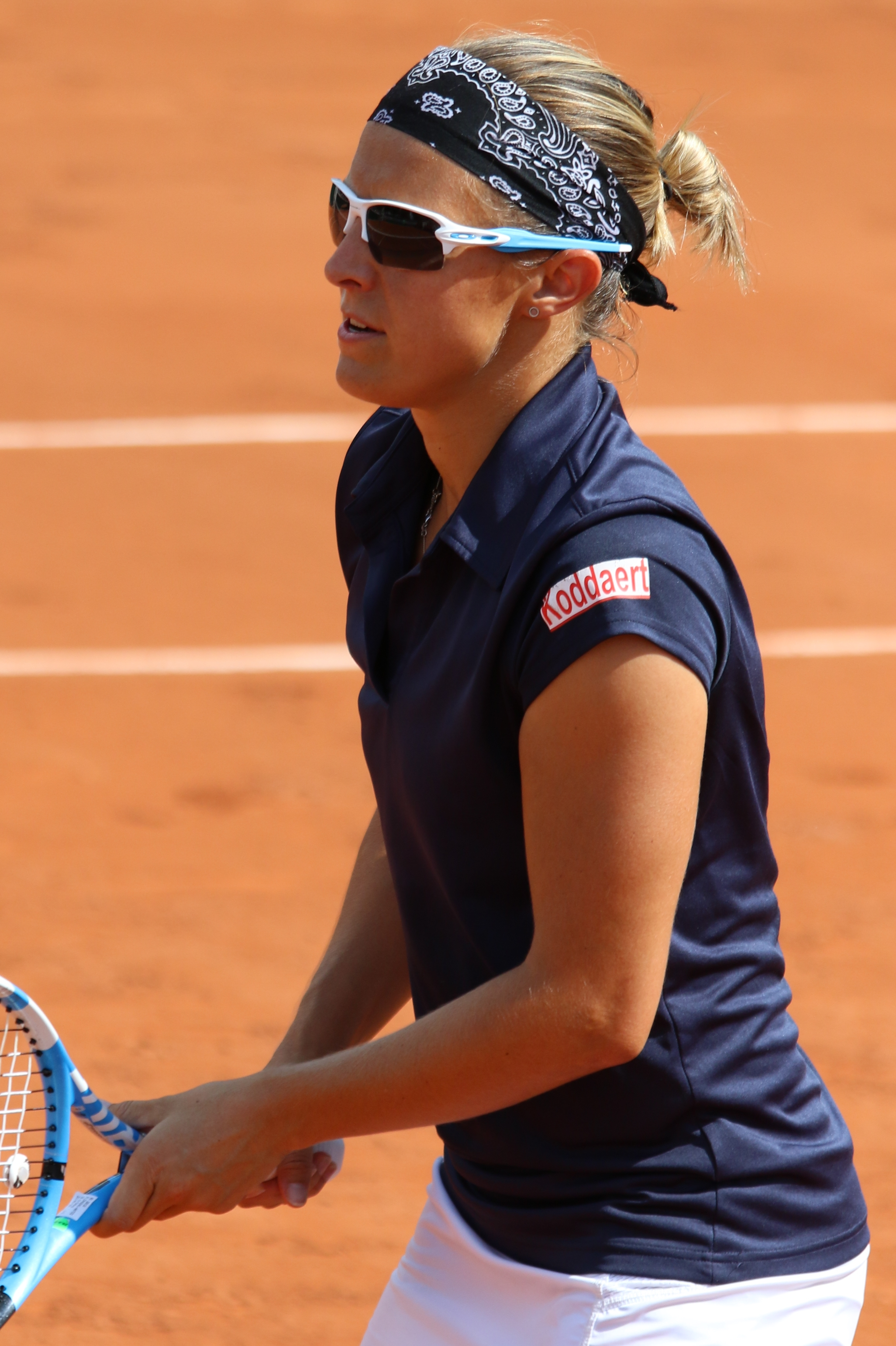
Kirsten Flipkens at the 2018 French Open

In 2017, Flipkens had few significant results in singles. At the Australian Open, she lost in the first round, while at the other three major events, she won one match per tournament, but then lost in the second round. During the 2017 season, she reached two quarterfinals, first at the International-level Monterrey Open in late February, and then at the Premier-level Connecticut Open in August. She also reached the third round of the Miami Open, being knocked out of the tournament by Dominika Cibulková. At Indian Wells and the Canadian Open, she only reached the second round.

Nevertheless, Flipkens had success in doubles in 2017. In the first week of the season, she reached a semifinal, partnering with Jeļena Ostapenko. After a disappointing second-round loss at the Australian Open, she made the final of the Nuremberg Cup, partnered with Johanna Larsson, losing a tense match against Melichar and Smith. She then reached quarterfinals of the French Open, partnering with Francesca Schiavone. After that, she debuted in the top 50, getting to No. 43. Things get even better during the grass-court season, when Flipkens won her second career-doubles title, winning the Rosmalen Grass Court Championships alongside Cibulková. She then partnered with Sania Mirza at Wimbledon, where they got to the third round. After subsequent unimpressive results, she finished the year making the final at the Luxembourg Open.

=== 2022–23: Sixth and seventh doubles titles, retirement ===
Flipkens announced that 2022 Wimbledon Championships would be her last ever singles tournament. She defeated qualifier Jaimee Fourlis, before losing in the second round to 16th seed Simona Halep in straight sets, after leading by a break in both sets.

However, she won her seventh tour title at the 2023 Hobart International alongside Laura Siegemund, with whom she had also won her sixth title at the Transylvania Open in Cluj-Napoca in October 2022.

She played her last doubles match at the 2023 Wimbledon Championships where she reached the third round with Timea Babos.

== National representation ==
=== Fed Cup / Billie Jean King Cup ===
In September 2006, she replaced the injured Kim Clijsters as the second member of the Belgian Fed Cup team in the final against Italy, alongside Justine Henin-Hardenne. Flipkens lost both her singles matches (against Schiavone and Santangelo). She and Henin-Hardenne then played the decisive doubles together, but had to retire in the third and final set due to Henin-Hardenne tearing a muscle in her leg, which led to Belgium losing the final with 2–3.

During the 2015 Fed Cup, she and her teammates failed to bring Belgium back to the World Group II after the team lost their final tie against Croatia.

In 2016, Flipkens was part of the Belgian Fed Cup team against Serbia as the two nations were competing for a spot in World Group II. As Belgium's second player (after Yanina Wickmayer), Flipkens played two singles matches. She lost the first one against Aleksandra Krunić, but beat the 18-year-old Ivana Jorović in the decider, and with this victory ensured Belgium of a place back into World Group II after three consecutive years in the Europe-Africa Zone I.

In the 2017 Fed Cup tie against Romania, Flipkens won her singles match against Monica Niculescu and thusly aided the Belgian team in securing a place in the World Group play-offs, since the team beat the Romanians with 3–1. At the Hungarian Ladies Open, Flipkens was defeated in the first round by qualifier Aliaksandra Sasnovich.

== Playing style ==
Flipkens describes herself as "an all court player" whose biggest strength is her "serve and all round game". She makes up for her short height and relative lack of physical strength with her good forehand and serve, her quickness and agility, and her ability to play almost every shot (which results in her frequently being awarded with "Shot of the Day" by the WTA). Her trademark shot is backhand slice and she often plays serve-and-volley. She prefers fast courts. Her favorite surface is grass.

== Coaching team ==
In December 2012, Maxime Braeckman became her new coach full-time coach, but she still occasionally worked with Clijsters. In October 2013, it was announced that Flipkens would stop working with Maxime Braeckman due to Braeckman wanting to stay more at home with his family.

In May 2014, Flipkens announced that she would begin to work with ex-tennis player Xavier Malisse. However, their cooperation ended already in June of the same year, after the French Open.

== Sponsors ==
Flipkens is sponsored by Babolat for tennis rackets. Her glasses are sponsored by Oakley. She used to wear Adidas clothing, but as of 2017 she launched her own clothing line and now plays in clothes she's designed herself. She also designed the official outfits of the Belgian Fed Cup team.

== Awards ==
At the end of the 2012 season, she was nominated for "Comeback Player of the Year" at the WTA Awards, an award that would eventually go to Yaroslava Shvedova. In December, Flipkens received the VTV Award for "Belgian Player of the Year". On 22 December 2013, she received the prestigious award for Sportswoman of the Year in Belgium as well as the VTV Award for "Belgian Player of the Year" for the second year in a row. In 2016, she received the Fed Cup Commitment Award in 2016 for being player who played the most year for the Belgian Fed Cup team (16 years as of 2019).

== Career statistics ==
=== Grand Slam tournament finals ===
==== Mixed doubles: 1 (runner-up) ====
| Result | Year | Championship | Surface | Partner | Opponents | Score |
|---|---|---|---|---|---|---|
| Loss | 2022 | US Open | Hard | (France) Édouard Roger-Vasselin | (Australia) Storm Sanders (Australia) John Peers | 6–4, 4–6, [7–10] |

=== Grand Slam tournament performance timelines ===
Key
| W | F | SF | QF | #R | RR | Q# | P# | DNQ | A | Z# | PO | G | S | B | NMS | NTI | P | NH |

(W) winner; (F) finalist; (SF) semifinalist; (QF) quarterfinalist; (#R) rounds 4, 3, 2, 1; (RR) round-robin stage; (Q#) qualification round; (P#) preliminary round; (DNQ) did not qualify; (A) absent; (Z#) Davis/Fed Cup Zonal Group (with number indication) or (PO) play-off; (G) gold, (S) silver or (B) bronze Olympic/Paralympic medal; (NMS) not a Masters tournament; (NTI) not a Tier I tournament; (P) postponed; (NH) not held; (SR) strike rate (events won / competed); (W–L) win–loss record.
To avoid confusion and double counting, these charts are updated at the conclusion of a tournament or when the player's participation has ended.

==== Singles ====
| Tournament | 2004 | 2005 | 2006 | 2007 | 2008 | 2009 | 2010 | 2011 | 2012 | 2013 | 2014 | 2015 | 2016 | 2017 | 2018 | 2019 | 2020 | 2021 | 2022 | SR | W–L | Win % |
|---|---|---|---|---|---|---|---|---|---|---|---|---|---|---|---|---|---|---|---|---|---|---|
| Australian Open | A | A | A | 1R | A | 2R | 1R | 1R | Q3 | 4R | 2R | 1R | 2R | 1R | 2R | 1R | 1R | 1R | 1R | 0 / 14 | 7–14 | 33% |
| French Open | A | Q1 | 2R | A | Q2 | 2R | 2R | 1R | A | 2R | 2R | 1R | 1R | 2R | 2R | 1R | 1R | A | A | 0 / 12 | 7–12 | 37% |
| Wimbledon | Q2 | Q3 | 1R | A | Q2 | 3R | 2R | 1R | A | SF | 3R | 2R | 2R | 2R | 2R | 2R | NH | A | 2R | 0 / 12 | 16–12 | 57% |
| US Open | A | Q1 | 2R | A | Q2 | 3R | 1R | Q1 | 2R | 1R | 1R | 1R | 1R | 2R | 2R | 2R | 2R | A | A | 0 / 12 | 8–12 | 40% |
| Win–loss | 0–0 | 0–0 | 2–3 | 0–1 | 0–0 | 6–4 | 2–4 | 0–3 | 1–1 | 9–4 | 4–4 | 1–4 | 2–4 | 3–4 | 4–4 | 2–4 | 1–3 | 0–1 | 1–2 | 0 / 50 | 38–50 | 43% |
Career statistics
| Titles | 0 | 0 | 0 | 0 | 0 | 0 | 0 | 0 | 1 | 0 | 0 | 0 | 0 | 0 | 0 | 0 | 0 | 0 | | Career total: 1 | | |
| Finals | 0 | 0 | 0 | 0 | 0 | 0 | 0 | 0 | 1 | 1 | 0 | 0 | 1 | 0 | 1 | 0 | 0 | 0 | | Career total: 4 | | |
| Year-end ranking | 169 | 201 | 105 | 363 | 104 | 81 | 77 | 194 | 54 | 20 | 46 | 93 | 63 | 76 | 48 | 95 | 85 | 305 | 241 | $6,028,921 | | |

==== Doubles ====
| Tournament | 2010 | 2011 | 2012 | 2013 | 2014 | 2015 | 2016 | 2017 | 2018 | 2019 | 2020 | 2021 | 2022 | 2023 | SR | W–L | Win% |
|---|---|---|---|---|---|---|---|---|---|---|---|---|---|---|---|---|---|
| Australian Open | 1R | 1R | A | 1R | 1R | 2R | 3R | 2R | 1R | 3R | 2R | 2R | QF | 1R | 0 / 13 | 11–13 | 46% |
| French Open | 1R | A | A | A | 2R | A | 2R | QF | 2R | SF | 2R | A | 2R | 2R | 0 / 9 | 13–9 | 59% |
| Wimbledon | 1R | A | A | 2R | 1R | A | 1R | 3R | 3R | 2R | NH | A | 3R | 3R | 0 / 9 | 10–9 | 53% |
| US Open | 1R | A | 1R | 2R | 1R | 2R | 1R | 1R | 1R | 1R | 1R | A | QF | | 0 / 11 | 5–11 | 31% |
| Win–loss | 0–4 | 0–1 | 0–1 | 2–3 | 1–4 | 2–2 | 3–4 | 6–4 | 3–4 | 7–4 | 2–3 | 1–1 | 9–4 | 3–3 | 0 / 42 | 39–42 | 48% |

==== Mixed doubles ====
This table is current through the 2023 Wimbledon Championships.

| Tournament | 2013 | 2014 | 2015 | 2016 | 2017 | 2018 | 2019 | 2020 | 2021 | 2022 | 2023 | SR | W–L | Win % |
|---|---|---|---|---|---|---|---|---|---|---|---|---|---|---|
| Australian Open | A | A | A | A | A | A | A | 1R | A | 1R | 1R | 0 / 3 | 0–3 | 0% |
| French Open | 1R | A | A | A | A | A | A | NH | A | A | A | 0 / 1 | 0–1 | 0% |
| Wimbledon | A | A | A | A | 2R | 3R | A | NH | A | A | 1R | 0 / 3 | 3–3 | 50% |
| US Open | A | A | A | A | A | A | 2R | NH | A | F | | 0 / 2 | 5–2 | 71% |
| Win–loss | 0–1 | 0–0 | 0–0 | 0–0 | 1–1 | 2–1 | 1–1 | 0–1 | 0–0 | 4–2 | 0–2 | 0 / 9 | 8–9 | 47% |

| Preceded by Barbora Strýcová | ITF Junior World Champion; 2003 | Succeeded by Michaëlla Krajicek |
